= 2025 Jannik Sinner tennis season =

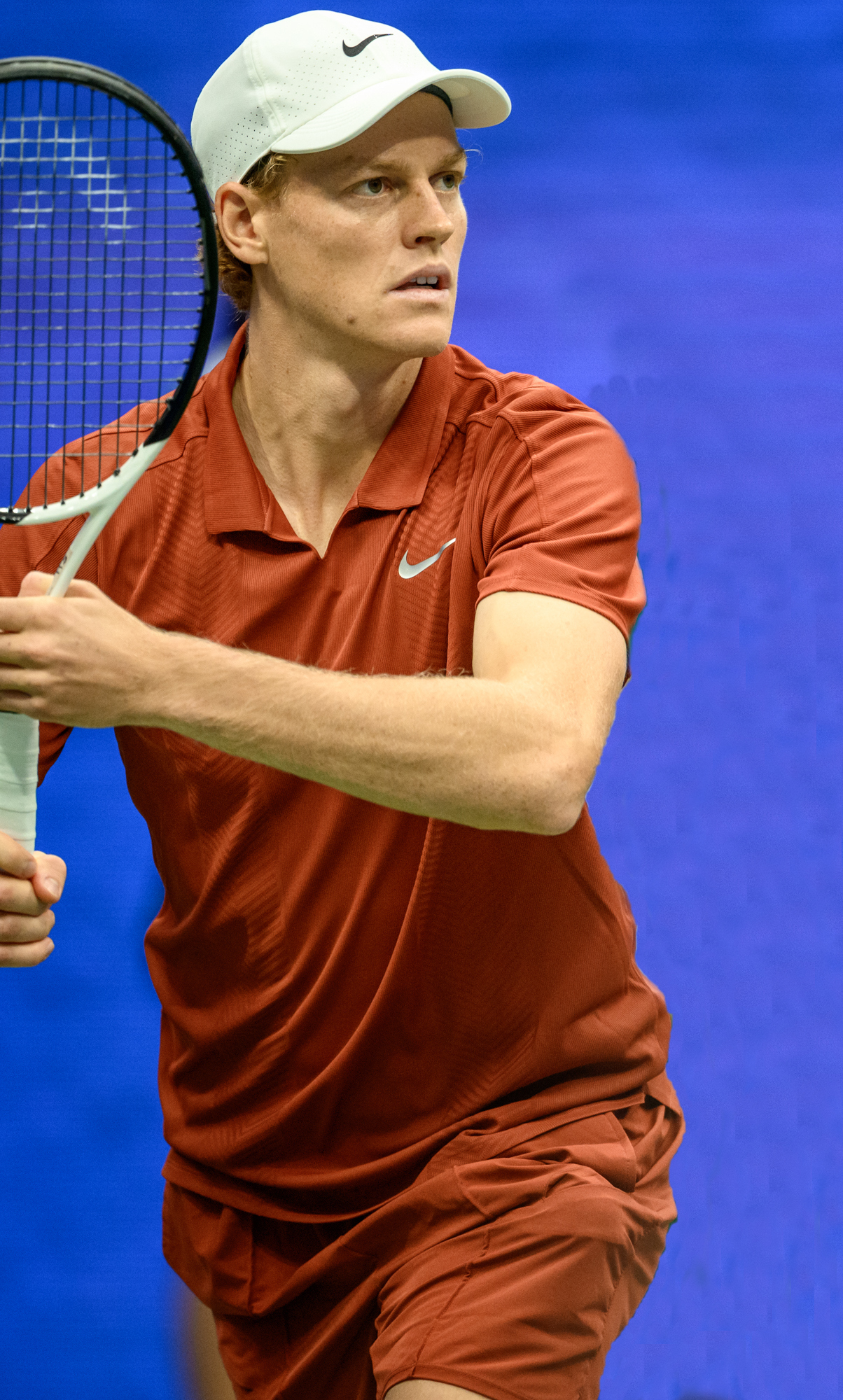
- Sinner at the 2025 US Open
- Full name: Jannik Sinner
- Country: Italy
- Calendar prize money: $19,120,641

Singles
- Season record: 58–6 (90.63%)
- Calendar titles: 6
- Year-end ranking: No. 2
- Ranking change from previous year: ▼1

Grand Slam & significant results
- Australian Open: W
- French Open: F
- Wimbledon: W
- US Open: F
- Other tournaments
- Tour Finals: W

Doubles
- Season record: 0–1
- Current ranking: no ranking
- Ranking change from previous year: ▲334

The 2025 Jannik Sinner tennis season began on 12 January 2025, with the start of the Australian Open in Melbourne. Sinner served a WADA suspension between 9 February and 4 May and was not eligible to compete in ATP events during that time.

During this season, Sinner:

- Won his first Wimbledon title (fourth major title overall).
- At 24 years old, became the youngest man in history to reach the final of all four Grand Slam tournaments and the ATP Finals in the same season.
- Reached 65 consecutive weeks as world number 1 in his first stint, surpassing Novak Djokovic as the fourth-longest first stint in the Open Era.
- Successfully defended a Grand Slam title at the Australian Open.
- Claimed a career-best 26-match winning streak, tying Andre Agassi for the seventh-longest winning streak since 1990.
- Won the ATP Finals for the second consecutive year, becoming the second man in history to win back-to-back ATP Finals titles without dropping a set.
- By winning the ATP Finals, claimed the largest prize-money payout in the event's history (US$5,071,000), and the largest ever for a male tennis player in the history of the sport.
- Captured a new Masters 1000 title at the Paris Masters.
- Closed the year with a win rate above 90% for the second consecutive season, becoming only the fourth player in the Open Era to finish successive seasons with a 90%+ win percentage (min. 10 matches), and the first since Roger Federer (2004–06).
- Finished the season with six titles, ten finals (6–4), ATP/Grand Slam prize money of US$19,120,641 (currently the fourth-highest of all time), and total earnings exceeding US$25 million.
- Extended his indoor dominance by winning 31 consecutive matches on indoor hard courts — the longest active indoor winning streak on tour and one of the longest of the 21st century.

== All matches ==
This table chronicles all the matches of Jannik Sinner in 2025.

Key
W	F	SF	QF	#R	RR	Q#	P#	DNQ	A	Z#	PO	G	S	B	NMS	NTI	P	NH

(W) winner; (F) finalist; (SF) semifinalist; (QF) quarterfinalist; (#R) rounds 4, 3, 2, 1; (RR) round-robin stage; (Q#) qualification round; (P#) preliminary round; (DNQ) did not qualify; (A) absent; (Z#) Davis/Fed Cup Zonal Group (with number indication) or (PO) play-off; (G) gold, (S) silver or (B) bronze Olympic/Paralympic medal; (NMS) not a Masters tournament; (NTI) not a Tier I tournament; (P) postponed; (NH) not held; (SR) strike rate (events won / competed); (W–L) win–loss record.
To avoid confusion and double counting, these charts are updated at the conclusion of a tournament or when the player's participation has ended.

=== Singles matches ===
Tournament	Match	Round	Opponent (seed or key)	Rank	Result	Score
Australian Open; Melbourne, Australia; Grand Slam tournament Hard, outdoor 12–26 January 2025
Australian Open; Melbourne, Australia; Grand Slam tournament Hard, outdoor 12–26 January 2025	1 / 344	1R	(Chile) Nicolás Jarry	36	Win	7–6^{(7–2)}, 7–6^{(7–5)}, 6–1
Australian Open; Melbourne, Australia; Grand Slam tournament Hard, outdoor 12–26 January 2025	2 / 345	2R	(Australia) Tristan Schoolkate (WC)	173	Win	4–6, 6–4, 6–1, 6–3
Australian Open; Melbourne, Australia; Grand Slam tournament Hard, outdoor 12–26 January 2025	3 / 346	3R	(United States) Marcos Giron	46	Win	6–3, 6–4, 6–2
Australian Open; Melbourne, Australia; Grand Slam tournament Hard, outdoor 12–26 January 2025	4 / 347	4R	(Denmark) Holger Rune (13)	13	Win	6–3, 3–6, 6–3, 6–2
Australian Open; Melbourne, Australia; Grand Slam tournament Hard, outdoor 12–26 January 2025	5 / 348	QF	(Australia) Alex de Minaur (8)	8	Win	6–3, 6–2, 6–1
Australian Open; Melbourne, Australia; Grand Slam tournament Hard, outdoor 12–26 January 2025	6 / 349	SF	(United States) Ben Shelton (21)	20	Win	7–6^{(7–2)}, 6–2, 6–2
Australian Open; Melbourne, Australia; Grand Slam tournament Hard, outdoor 12–26 January 2025	7 / 350	W	(Germany) Alexander Zverev (2)	2	Win (1)	6–3, 7–6^{(7–4)}, 6–3
Italian Open; Rome, Italy; ATP 1000; Clay, outdoor 7–18 May 2025
Italian Open; Rome, Italy; ATP 1000; Clay, outdoor 7–18 May 2025	–	1R	Bye			
Italian Open; Rome, Italy; ATP 1000; Clay, outdoor 7–18 May 2025	8 / 351	2R	(Argentina) Mariano Navone	99	Win	6–3, 6–4
Italian Open; Rome, Italy; ATP 1000; Clay, outdoor 7–18 May 2025	9 / 352	3R	(Netherlands) Jesper de Jong (LL)	93	Win	6–4, 6–2
Italian Open; Rome, Italy; ATP 1000; Clay, outdoor 7–18 May 2025	10 / 353	4R	(Argentina) Francisco Cerúndolo (17)	18	Win	7–6^{(7–2)}, 6–3
Italian Open; Rome, Italy; ATP 1000; Clay, outdoor 7–18 May 2025	11 / 354	QF	(Norway) Casper Ruud (6)	7	Win	6–0, 6–1
Italian Open; Rome, Italy; ATP 1000; Clay, outdoor 7–18 May 2025	12 / 355	SF	(United States) Tommy Paul (11)	12	Win	1–6, 6–0, 6–3
Italian Open; Rome, Italy; ATP 1000; Clay, outdoor 7–18 May 2025	13 / 356	F	(Spain) Carlos Alcaraz (3)	3	Loss	6–7^{(5–7)}, 1–6
French Open; Paris, France; Grand Slam tournament Clay, outdoor 25 May – 8 June 2025
French Open; Paris, France; Grand Slam tournament Clay, outdoor 25 May – 8 June 2025	14 / 357	1R	(France) Arthur Rinderknech	75	Win	6–4, 6–3, 7–5
French Open; Paris, France; Grand Slam tournament Clay, outdoor 25 May – 8 June 2025	15 / 358	2R	(France) Richard Gasquet (WC)	166	Win	6–3, 6–0, 6–4
French Open; Paris, France; Grand Slam tournament Clay, outdoor 25 May – 8 June 2025	16 / 359	3R	(Czech Republic) Jiří Lehečka	34	Win	6–0, 6–1, 6–2
French Open; Paris, France; Grand Slam tournament Clay, outdoor 25 May – 8 June 2025	17 / 360	4R	Andrey Rublev (17)	15	Win	6–1, 6–3, 6–4
French Open; Paris, France; Grand Slam tournament Clay, outdoor 25 May – 8 June 2025	18 / 361	QF	(Kazakhstan) Alexander Bublik	62	Win	6–1, 7–5, 6–0
French Open; Paris, France; Grand Slam tournament Clay, outdoor 25 May – 8 June 2025	19 / 362	SF	(Serbia) Novak Djokovic (6)	6	Win	6–4, 7–5, 7–6^{(7–3)}
French Open; Paris, France; Grand Slam tournament Clay, outdoor 25 May – 8 June 2025	20 / 363	F	(Spain) Carlos Alcaraz (2)	2	Loss	6–4, 7–6^{(7–4)}, 4–6, 6–7^{(3–7)}, 6–7^{(2–10)}
Halle Open; Halle, Germany; ATP 500; Grass, outdoor 16–22 June 2025
Halle Open; Halle, Germany; ATP 500; Grass, outdoor 16–22 June 2025	21 / 364	1R	(Germany) Yannick Hanfmann (Q)	138	Win	7–5, 6–3
Halle Open; Halle, Germany; ATP 500; Grass, outdoor 16–22 June 2025	22 / 365	2R	(Kazakhstan) Alexander Bublik	45	Loss	6–3, 3–6, 4–6
Wimbledon; London, United Kingdom; Grand Slam tournament Grass, outdoor 30 June – 13 July 2025
Wimbledon; London, United Kingdom; Grand Slam tournament Grass, outdoor 30 June – 13 July 2025	23 / 366	1R	(Italy) Luca Nardi	95	Win	6–4, 6–3, 6–0
Wimbledon; London, United Kingdom; Grand Slam tournament Grass, outdoor 30 June – 13 July 2025	24 / 367	2R	(Australia) Aleksandar Vukic	93	Win	6–1, 6–1, 6–3
Wimbledon; London, United Kingdom; Grand Slam tournament Grass, outdoor 30 June – 13 July 2025	25 / 368	3R	(Spain) Pedro Martínez	52	Win	6–1, 6–3, 6–1
Wimbledon; London, United Kingdom; Grand Slam tournament Grass, outdoor 30 June – 13 July 2025	26 / 369	4R	(Bulgaria) Grigor Dimitrov (19)	21	Win	3–6, 5–7, 2–2 ret.
Wimbledon; London, United Kingdom; Grand Slam tournament Grass, outdoor 30 June – 13 July 2025	27 / 370	QF	(United States) Ben Shelton (10)	10	Win	7–6^{(7–2)}, 6–4, 6–4
Wimbledon; London, United Kingdom; Grand Slam tournament Grass, outdoor 30 June – 13 July 2025	28 / 371	SF	(Serbia) Novak Djokovic (6)	6	Win	6–3, 6–3, 6–4
Wimbledon; London, United Kingdom; Grand Slam tournament Grass, outdoor 30 June – 13 July 2025	29 / 372	W	(Spain) Carlos Alcaraz (2)	2	Win (2)	4–6, 6–4, 6–4, 6–4
Cincinnati Open; Cincinnati, United States; ATP 1000; Hard, outdoor 7–18 August 2025
Cincinnati Open; Cincinnati, United States; ATP 1000; Hard, outdoor 7–18 August 2025	–	1R	Bye			
Cincinnati Open; Cincinnati, United States; ATP 1000; Hard, outdoor 7–18 August 2025	30 / 373	2R	(Colombia) Daniel Elahi Galán (Q)	144	Win	6–1, 6–1
Cincinnati Open; Cincinnati, United States; ATP 1000; Hard, outdoor 7–18 August 2025	31 / 374	3R	(Canada) Gabriel Diallo (30)	35	Win	6–2, 7–6^{(8–6)}
Cincinnati Open; Cincinnati, United States; ATP 1000; Hard, outdoor 7–18 August 2025	32 / 375	4R	(France) Adrian Mannarino (Q)	89	Win	6–4, 7–6^{(7–4)}
Cincinnati Open; Cincinnati, United States; ATP 1000; Hard, outdoor 7–18 August 2025	33 / 376	QF	(Canada) Félix Auger-Aliassime (23)	28	Win	6–0, 6–2
Cincinnati Open; Cincinnati, United States; ATP 1000; Hard, outdoor 7–18 August 2025	34 / 377	SF	(France) Térence Atmane (Q)	136	Win	7–6^{(7–4)}, 6–2
Cincinnati Open; Cincinnati, United States; ATP 1000; Hard, outdoor 7–18 August 2025	35 / 378	F	(Spain) Carlos Alcaraz (2)	2	Loss	0–5 ret.
US Open; New York City, United States; Grand Slam tournament Hard, outdoor 24 August – 7 September 2025
US Open; New York City, United States; Grand Slam tournament Hard, outdoor 24 August – 7 September 2025	36 / 379	1R	(Czech Republic) Vít Kopřiva	87	Win	6–1, 6–1, 6–2
US Open; New York City, United States; Grand Slam tournament Hard, outdoor 24 August – 7 September 2025	37 / 380	2R	(Australia) Alexei Popyrin	36	Win	6–3, 6–2, 6–2
US Open; New York City, United States; Grand Slam tournament Hard, outdoor 24 August – 7 September 2025	38 / 381	3R	(Canada) Denis Shapovalov (27)	29	Win	5–7, 6–4, 6–3, 6–3
US Open; New York City, United States; Grand Slam tournament Hard, outdoor 24 August – 7 September 2025	39 / 382	4R	(Kazakhstan) Alexander Bublik (23)	24	Win	6–1, 6–1, 6–1
US Open; New York City, United States; Grand Slam tournament Hard, outdoor 24 August – 7 September 2025	40 / 383	QF	(Italy) Lorenzo Musetti (10)	10	Win	6–1, 6–4, 6–2
US Open; New York City, United States; Grand Slam tournament Hard, outdoor 24 August – 7 September 2025	41 / 384	SF	(Canada) Félix Auger-Aliassime (25)	27	Win	6–1, 3–6, 6–3, 6–4
US Open; New York City, United States; Grand Slam tournament Hard, outdoor 24 August – 7 September 2025	42 / 385	F	(Spain) Carlos Alcaraz (2)	2	Loss	2–6, 6–3, 1–6, 4–6
China Open; Beijing, China; ATP 500; Hard, outdoor 25 September – 1 October 2025
China Open; Beijing, China; ATP 500; Hard, outdoor 25 September – 1 October 2025	43 / 386	1R	(Croatia) Marin Čilić	97	Win	6–2, 6–2
China Open; Beijing, China; ATP 500; Hard, outdoor 25 September – 1 October 2025	44 / 387	2R	(France) Térence Atmane (Q)	68	Win	6–4, 5–7, 6–0
China Open; Beijing, China; ATP 500; Hard, outdoor 25 September – 1 October 2025	45 / 388	QF	(Hungary) Fábián Marozsán	57	Win	6–1, 7–5
China Open; Beijing, China; ATP 500; Hard, outdoor 25 September – 1 October 2025	46 / 389	SF	(Australia) Alex de Minaur	8	Win	6–3, 4–6, 6–2
China Open; Beijing, China; ATP 500; Hard, outdoor 25 September – 1 October 2025	47 / 390	W	(United States) Learner Tien	52	Win (3)	6–2, 6–2
Shanghai Masters; Shanghai, China; ATP 1000; Hard, outdoor 1–12 October 2025
Shanghai Masters; Shanghai, China; ATP 1000; Hard, outdoor 1–12 October 2025	–	1R	Bye			
Shanghai Masters; Shanghai, China; ATP 1000; Hard, outdoor 1–12 October 2025	48 / 391	2R	(Germany) Daniel Altmaier	49	Win	6–3, 6–3
Shanghai Masters; Shanghai, China; ATP 1000; Hard, outdoor 1–12 October 2025	49 / 392	3R	(Netherlands) Tallon Griekspoor (27)	31	Loss	7–6^{(7–3)}, 5–7, 2–3 ret.
Vienna Open; Vienna, Austria; ATP 500; Hard, indoor 20 – 26 October 2025
Vienna Open; Vienna, Austria; ATP 500; Hard, indoor 20 – 26 October 2025	50 / 393	1R	(Germany) Daniel Altmaier	51	Win	6–0, 6–2
Vienna Open; Vienna, Austria; ATP 500; Hard, indoor 20 – 26 October 2025	51 / 394	2R	(Italy) Flavio Cobolli	22	Win	6–2, 7–6^{(7–4)}
Vienna Open; Vienna, Austria; ATP 500; Hard, indoor 20 – 26 October 2025	52 / 395	QF	(Kazakhstan) Alexander Bublik (8)	16	Win	6–4, 6–4
Vienna Open; Vienna, Austria; ATP 500; Hard, indoor 20 – 26 October 2025	53 / 396	SF	(Australia) Alex de Minaur (3)	7	Win	6–3, 6–4
Vienna Open; Vienna, Austria; ATP 500; Hard, indoor 20 – 26 October 2025	54 / 397	W	(Germany) Alexander Zverev (2)	3	Win (4)	3–6, 6–3, 7–5
Paris Masters; Paris, France; ATP 1000; Hard, indoor 27 October – 2 November 2025
Paris Masters; Paris, France; ATP 1000; Hard, indoor 27 October – 2 November 2025	–	1R	Bye			
Paris Masters; Paris, France; ATP 1000; Hard, indoor 27 October – 2 November 2025	55 / 398	2R	(Belgium) Zizou Bergs	41	Win	6–4, 6–2
Paris Masters; Paris, France; ATP 1000; Hard, indoor 27 October – 2 November 2025	56 / 399	3R	(Argentina) Francisco Cerúndolo (17)	21	Win	7–5, 6–1
Paris Masters; Paris, France; ATP 1000; Hard, indoor 27 October – 2 November 2025	57 / 400	QF	(United States) Ben Shelton (5)	7	Win	6–3, 6–3
Paris Masters; Paris, France; ATP 1000; Hard, indoor 27 October – 2 November 2025	58 / 401	SF	(Germany) Alexander Zverev (3)	3	Win	6–0, 6–1
Paris Masters; Paris, France; ATP 1000; Hard, indoor 27 October – 2 November 2025	59 / 402	W	(Canada) Félix Auger-Aliassime (9)	10	Win (5)	6–4, 7–6^{(7–4)}
ATP Finals; Turin, Italy; ATP Finals; Hard, indoor 9 – 16 November 2025
ATP Finals; Turin, Italy; ATP Finals; Hard, indoor 9 – 16 November 2025	60 / 403	RR	(Canada) Félix Auger-Aliassime (8)	8	Win	7–5, 6–1
ATP Finals; Turin, Italy; ATP Finals; Hard, indoor 9 – 16 November 2025	61 / 404	RR	(Germany) Alexander Zverev (3)	3	Win	6–4, 6–3
ATP Finals; Turin, Italy; ATP Finals; Hard, indoor 9 – 16 November 2025	62 / 405	RR	(United States) Ben Shelton (5)	5	Win	6–3, 7–6^{(7–3)}
ATP Finals; Turin, Italy; ATP Finals; Hard, indoor 9 – 16 November 2025	63 / 406	SF	(Australia) Alex de Minaur (7)	7	Win	7–5, 6–2
ATP Finals; Turin, Italy; ATP Finals; Hard, indoor 9 – 16 November 2025	64 / 407	W	(Spain) Carlos Alcaraz (1)	1	Win (6)	7–6^{(7–4)}, 7–5

=== Doubles matches ===
Tournament	Match	Round	Opponent (seed or key)	Rank	Result	Score
Halle Open; Halle, Germany; ATP 500; Grass, outdoor 16 – 22 June 2025; Partner: (Italy) Lorenzo Sonego
Halle Open; Halle, Germany; ATP 500; Grass, outdoor 16 – 22 June 2025; Partner: (Italy) Lorenzo Sonego	1 / 51	1R	Karen Khachanov / (United States) Alex Michelsen	147 / 71	Loss	6–2, 5–7, [3–10]

== Exhibition matches ==
=== Singles ===
Tournament	Match	Round	Opponent (seed or key)	Rank	Result	Score
Australian Open Opening Week; Melbourne, Australia Hard, outdoor 7 – 10 January 2025
Australian Open Opening Week; Melbourne, Australia Hard, outdoor 7 – 10 January 2025	1	PO	(Australia) Alexei Popyrin	25	Win	6–4, 7–6^{(7–2)}
Australian Open Opening Week; Melbourne, Australia Hard, outdoor 7 – 10 January 2025	2	PO	(Greece) Stefanos Tsitsipas	11	Win	6–3, 7–6^{(7–5)}
6 Kings Slam; Riyadh, Saudi Arabia Hard, outdoor 15 – 18 October 2025
6 Kings Slam; Riyadh, Saudi Arabia Hard, outdoor 15 – 18 October 2025	3	QF	(Greece) Stefanos Tsitsipas	24	Win	6–2, 6–3
6 Kings Slam; Riyadh, Saudi Arabia Hard, outdoor 15 – 18 October 2025	4	SF	(Serbia) Novak Djokovic	5	Win	6–4, 6–2
6 Kings Slam; Riyadh, Saudi Arabia Hard, outdoor 15 – 18 October 2025	5	W	(Spain) Carlos Alcaraz	2	Win	6–2, 6–4

== Schedule ==
=== Singles schedule ===
Per Jannik Sinner, this is his current 2025 schedule (subject to change).

Date	Tournament	Location	Tier	Surface	Prev. result	Prev. points	New points	Result
12 January 2025– 26 January 2025	Australian Open	Melbourne (AUS)	Grand Slam	Hard	W	2000	2000	Champion (defeated Alexander Zverev, 6–3, 7–6^{(7–4)}, 6–3)
3 February 2025– 9 February 2025	Rotterdam Open	Rotterdam (NED)	ATP 500	Hard (i)	W	500	0	Withdrew - Suspended for 3 months by the World Anti-Doping Agency (WADA)
17 February 2025– 22 February 2025	Qatar Open	Doha (QAT)	ATP 500	Hard	A	0	0	Withdrew - Suspended for 3 months by the World Anti-Doping Agency (WADA)
5 March 2025– 16 March 2025	Indian Wells Open	Indian Wells (USA)	Masters 1000	Hard	SF	0	0	Withdrew - Suspended for 3 months by the World Anti-Doping Agency (WADA)
19 March 2025– 30 March 2025	Miami Open	Miami (USA)	Masters 1000	Hard	W	1000	0	Withdrew - Suspended for 3 months by the World Anti-Doping Agency (WADA)
6 April 2025– 13 April 2025	Monte-Carlo Masters	Roquebrune-Cap-Martin (FRA)	Masters 1000	Clay	SF	400	0	Withdrew - Suspended for 3 months by the World Anti-Doping Agency (WADA)
23 April 2025– 4 May 2025	Madrid Open	Madrid (ESP)	Masters 1000	Clay	QF	200	0	Withdrew - Suspended for 3 months by the World Anti-Doping Agency (WADA)
7 May 2025– 18 May 2025	Italian Open	Rome (ITA)	Masters 1000	Clay	A	0	650	Final (lost to Carlos Alcaraz, 6–7^{(5–7)}, 1–6)
25 May 2025– 8 June 2025	French Open	Paris (FRA)	Grand Slam	Clay	SF	800	1300	Final (lost to Carlos Alcaraz, 6–4, 7–6^{(7–4)}, 4–6, 6–7^{(3–7)}, 6–7^{(2–10)})
16 June 2025– 22 June 2025	Halle Open	Halle (GER)	ATP 500	Grass	W	500	50	Second round (lost to Alexander Bublik, 6–3, 3–6, 4–6)
30 June 2025– 13 July 2025	Wimbledon	London (GBR)	Grand Slam	Grass	QF	400	2000	Champion (defeated Carlos Alcaraz, 4–6, 6–4, 6–4, 6–4)
27 July 2025– 7 August 2025	Canadian Open	Toronto (CAN)	Masters 1000	Hard	QF	200	0	Withdrew
7 August 2025– 18 August 2025	Cincinnati Open	Cincinnati (USA)	Masters 1000	Hard	W	1000	650	Final (lost to Carlos Alcaraz, 0–5 ret.)
24 August 2025– 7 September 2025	US Open	New York (USA)	Grand Slam	Hard	W	2000	1300	Final (lost to Carlos Alcaraz, 2–6, 6–3, 1–6, 4–6)
25 September 2025– 1 October 2025	China Open	Beijing (CHN)	ATP 500	Hard	F	330	500	Champion (defeated Learner Tien, 6–2, 6–2)
1 October 2025– 12 October 2025	Shanghai Masters	Shanghai (CHN)	Masters 1000	Hard	W	1000	50	Third round (lost to Tallon Griekspoor, 7–6^{(7–3)}, 5–7, 2–3 ret.)
20 October 2025– 26 October 2025	Vienna Open	Vienna (AUT)	ATP 500	Hard (i)	A	0	500	Champion (defeated Alexander Zverev, 3–6, 6–3, 7–5)
27 October 2025– 2 November 2025	Paris Masters	Paris (FRA)	Masters 1000	Hard (i)	A	0	1000	Champion (defeated Félix Auger-Aliassime, 6–4, 7–6^{(7–4)})
9 November 2025– 16 November 2025	ATP Finals	Turin (ITA)	Tour Finals	Hard (i)	W	1500	1500	Champion (defeated Carlos Alcaraz, 7–6^{(7–4)}, 7–5)
Total year-end points (as of ATP Finals)						11830	11500	
Total year-end points						11830	11500	▼330 difference
Source: Rankings breakdown

== Yearly records ==
=== Head-to-head matchups ===
Jannik Sinner has a 58–6 (90.63%) ATP match win–loss record in the 2025 season. His record against players who were part of the ATP rankings Top–10 at the time of their meetings is 19–4 (82.61%). Bold indicates player was ranked top 10 at the time of at least one meeting. The following list is ordered by number of wins:

- **(Canada) Félix Auger-Aliassime** 4–0
- **(Australia) Alex de Minaur** 4–0
- **(United States) Ben Shelton** 4–0
- **(Germany) Alexander Zverev** 4–0
- (Kazakhstan) Alexander Bublik 3–1
- (Germany) Daniel Altmaier 2–0
- (France) Térence Atmane 2–0
- (Argentina) Francisco Cerúndolo 2–0
- **(Serbia) Novak Djokovic** 2–0
- **(Spain) Carlos Alcaraz** 2–4
- (Belgium) Zizou Bergs 1–0
- (Croatia) Marin Čilić 1–0
- (Italy) Flavio Cobolli 1–0
- (Netherlands) Jesper de Jong 1–0
- (Canada) Gabriel Diallo 1–0
- (Bulgaria) Grigor Dimitrov 1–0
- (Colombia) Daniel Elahi Galán 1–0
- (France) Richard Gasquet 1–0
- (United States) Marcos Giron 1–0
- (Germany) Yannick Hanfmann 1–0
- (Chile) Nicolás Jarry 1–0
- (Czech Republic) Vít Kopřiva 1–0
- (Czech Republic) Jiří Lehečka 1–0
- (France) Adrian Mannarino 1–0
- (Hungary) Fábián Marozsán 1–0
- (Spain) Pedro Martínez 1–0
- **(Italy) Lorenzo Musetti** 1–0
- (Italy) Luca Nardi 1–0
- (Argentina) Mariano Navone 1–0
- (United States) Tommy Paul 1–0
- (Australia) Alexei Popyrin 1–0
- (France) Arthur Rinderknech 1–0
- Andrey Rublev 1–0
- (Denmark) Holger Rune 1–0
- **(Norway) Casper Ruud** 1–0
- (Australia) Tristan Schoolkate 1–0
- (Canada) Denis Shapovalov 1–0
- (United States) Learner Tien 1–0
- (Australia) Aleksandar Vukic 1–0
- (Netherlands) Tallon Griekspoor 0–1

* Statistics correct as of 16 November 2025.

=== Top 10 record (19–4) ===
Category Grand Slam (7–2) ATP Finals (5–0) Laver Cup (0–0) Masters 1000 (4–2) 500 Series (3–0) 250 Series (0–0)	Wins by surface Hard (14–2) Clay (2–2) Grass (3–0)	Wins by setting Outdoor (9–4) Indoor (10–0)

Result	W–L	Player	Rk	Event	Surface	Rd	Score	Rk	Ref
Win	1–0	(Australia) Alex de Minaur	8	Australian Open, Australia	Hard	QF	6–3, 6–2, 6–1	**1**	
Win	2–0	(Germany) Alexander Zverev	2	Australian Open, Australia	Hard	F	6–3, 7–6^{(7–4)}, 6–3	**1**	
Win	3–0	(Norway) Casper Ruud	6	Italian Open, Italy	Clay	QF	6–0, 6–1	**1**	
Loss	3–1	(Spain) Carlos Alcaraz	3	Italian Open, Italy	Clay	F	6–7^{(5–7)}, 1–6	**1**	
Win	4–1	(Serbia) Novak Djokovic	6	French Open, France	Clay	SF	6–4, 7–5, 7–6^{(7–3)}	**1**	
Loss	4–2	(Spain) Carlos Alcaraz	2	French Open, France	Clay	F	6–4, 7–6^{(7–4)}, 4–6, 6–7^{(3–7)}, 6–7^{(2–10)}	**1**	
Win	5–2	(United States) Ben Shelton	10	Wimbledon, United Kingdom	Grass	QF	7–6^{(7–2)}, 6–4, 6–4	**1**	
Win	6–2	(Serbia) Novak Djokovic	6	Wimbledon, United Kingdom	Grass	SF	6–3, 6–3, 6–4	**1**	
Win	7–2	(Spain) Carlos Alcaraz	2	Wimbledon, United Kingdom	Grass	F	4–6, 6–4, 6–4, 6–4	**1**	
Loss	7–3	(Spain) Carlos Alcaraz	2	Cincinnati Open, United States	Hard	F	0–5 ret.	**1**	
Win	8–3	(Italy) Lorenzo Musetti	10	US Open, United States	Hard	QF	6–1, 6–4, 6–2	**1**	
Loss	8–4	(Spain) Carlos Alcaraz	2	US Open, United States	Hard	F	2–6, 6–3, 1–6, 4–6	**1**	
Win	9–4	(Australia) Alex de Minaur	8	China Open, China	Hard	SF	6–3, 4–6, 6–2	2	
Win	10–4	(Australia) Alex de Minaur	7	Vienna Open, Austria	Hard (i)	SF	6–3, 6–4	2	
Win	11–4	(Germany) Alexander Zverev	3	Vienna Open, Austria	Hard (i)	F	3–6, 6–3, 7–5	2	
Win	12–4	(United States) Ben Shelton	7	Paris Masters, France	Hard (i)	QF	6–3, 6–3	2	
Win	13–4	(Germany) Alexander Zverev	3	Paris Masters, France	Hard (i)	SF	6–0, 6–1	2	
Win	14–4	(Canada) Félix Auger-Aliassime	10	Paris Masters, France	Hard (i)	F	6–4, 7–6^{(7–4)}	2	
Win	15–4	(Canada) Félix Auger-Aliassime	8	ATP Finals, Italy	Hard (i)	RR	7–5, 6–1	2	
Win	16–4	(Germany) Alexander Zverev	3	ATP Finals, Italy	Hard (i)	RR	6–4, 6–3	2	
Win	17–4	(United States) Ben Shelton	5	ATP Finals, Italy	Hard (i)	RR	6–3, 7–6^{(7–3)}	2	
Win	18–4	(Australia) Alex de Minaur	7	ATP Finals, Italy	Hard (i)	SF	7–5, 6–2	2	
Win	19–4	(Spain) Carlos Alcaraz	**1**	ATP Finals, Italy	Hard (i)	F	7–6^{(7–4)}, 7–5	2	

- Key: (Rk) first use, opponent rank; (Rd) round; (Rk) 2nd use, player rank; (Ref) reference; (F) final; (SF) semifinal; (QF) quarterfinal; (#R) rounds 4, 3, 2, 1; (RR) round-robin stage; (Q#) qualifying rounds or stages (3), 2, 1.

=== Finals ===
==== Singles: 10 (6 titles, 4 runner-ups) ====
Category Grand Slam (2–2) ATP Finals (1–0) ATP Masters 1000 (1–2) ATP 500 Series (2–0) ATP 250 Series (0–0)	Titles by surface Hard (5–2) Clay (0–2) Grass (1–0)	Titles by setting Outdoor (3–4) Indoor (3–0)

Result	W–L	Date	Tournament	Tier	Surface	Opponent	Score
Win	1–0	Jan 2025	Australian Open, Australia	Grand Slam	Hard	(Germany) Alexander Zverev	6–3, 7–6^{(7–4)}, 6–3
Loss	1–1	May 2025	Italian Open, Italy	Masters 1000	Clay	(Spain) Carlos Alcaraz	6–7^{(5–7)}, 1–6
Loss	1–2	Jun 2025	French Open, France	Grand Slam	Clay	(Spain) Carlos Alcaraz	6–4, 7–6^{(7–4)}, 4–6, 6–7^{(3–7)}, 6–7^{(2–10)}
Win	2–2	Jul 2025	Wimbledon, United Kingdom	Grand Slam	Grass	(Spain) Carlos Alcaraz	4–6, 6–4, 6–4, 6–4
Loss	2–3	Aug 2025	Cincinnati Open, United States	Masters 1000	Hard	(Spain) Carlos Alcaraz	0–5 ret.
Loss	2–4	Sep 2025	US Open, United States	Grand Slam	Hard	(Spain) Carlos Alcaraz	2–6, 6–3, 1–6, 4–6
Win	3–4	Oct 2025	China Open, China	500 Series	Hard	(United States) Learner Tien	6–2, 6–2
Win	4–4	Oct 2025	Vienna Open, Austria	500 Series	Hard (i)	(Germany) Alexander Zverev	3–6, 6–3, 7–5
Win	5–4	Nov 2025	Paris Masters, France	Masters 1000	Hard (i)	(Canada) Félix Auger-Aliassime	6–4, 7–6^{(7–4)}
Win	6–4	Nov 2025	ATP Finals, Italy	ATP Finals	Hard (i)	(Spain) Carlos Alcaraz	7–6^{(7–4)}, 7–5

=== Earnings ===
- **Bold** font denotes tournament win

**Singles**
Event	Prize money	Year-to-date
**Australian Open**	**A$3,500,000**	$2,150,400
Italian Open	€523,870	$2,830,697
French Open	€1,275,000	$4,279,480
Halle Open	€36,885	$4,322,063
**Wimbledon Championships**	**£3,000,000**	$8,437,163
Cincinnati Open	$597,890	$9,035,053
US Open	$2,500,000	$11,535,053
**China Open**	**$751,075**	$12,286,128
Shanghai Masters	$60,400	$12,346,528
**Vienna Open**	**€511,835**	$12,942,867
**Paris Masters**	**€946,610**	$14,043,396
**ATP Finals**	**$5,071,000**	$19,114,396
Bonus Pool ATP Ranking : **#2**	Not eligible*	$19,114,396
		$19,114,396
**Doubles**
Event	Prize money	Year-to-date
Halle Open	€5,410	$6,245
		$6,245
**Total**
		**$19,120,641**

Figures in United States dollars (USD) unless noted.

*missed required Masters 1000 events.

- source：2025 Singles Activity
- source：2025 Doubles Activity

== See also ==
- 2025 ATP Tour
- 2025 Carlos Alcaraz tennis season
- 2025 Novak Djokovic tennis season
