= Jannik Sinner career statistics =

Career finals
Discipline	Type	Won	Lost	Total
Singles
Singles	Grand Slam	5	2	7
Singles	ATP Finals	2	1	3
Singles	ATP 1000	10	4	14
Singles	ATP 500	7	2	9
Singles	ATP 250	6	0	6
Singles	Olympics	–	–	–
Singles	Total	30	9	39
Doubles
Doubles	Grand Slam	–	–	–
Doubles	ATP Finals	–	–	–
Doubles	ATP 1000	–	–	–
Doubles	ATP 500	–	–	–
Doubles	ATP 250	1	0	1
Doubles	Olympics	–	–	–
Doubles	Total	1	0	1

This is a list of main career statistics of Italian professional tennis player Jannik Sinner. All statistics are according to the ATP Tour and ITF websites.

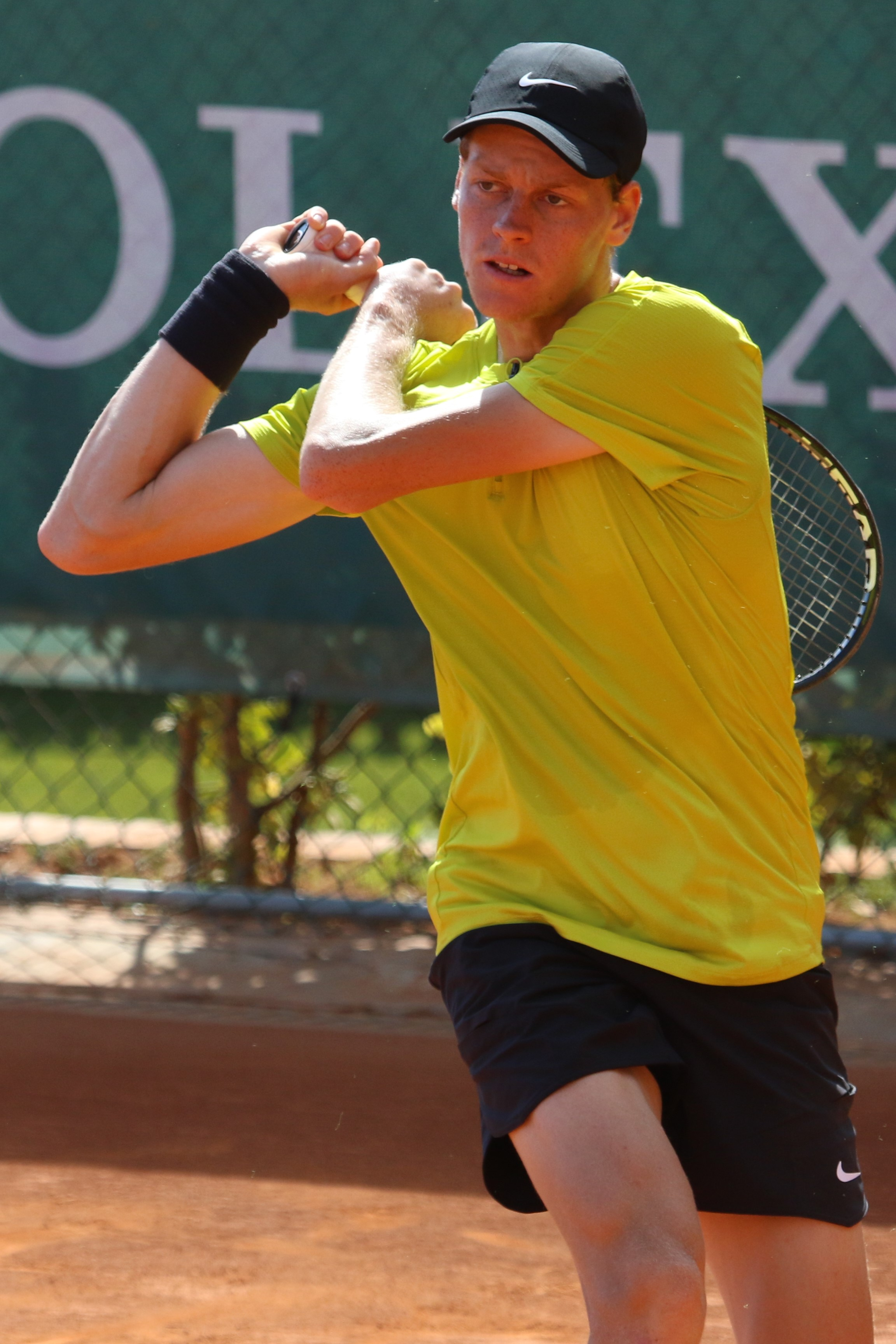
Sinner at the 2023 Monte-Carlo Masters.

== Performance timeline ==
Key
W	F	SF	QF	#R	RR	Q#	P#	DNQ	A	Z#	PO	G	S	B	NMS	NTI	P	NH

(W) winner; (F) finalist; (SF) semifinalist; (QF) quarterfinalist; (#R) rounds 4, 3, 2, 1; (RR) round-robin stage; (Q#) qualification round; (P#) preliminary round; (DNQ) did not qualify; (A) absent; (Z#) Davis/Fed Cup Zonal Group (with number indication) or (PO) play-off; (G) gold, (S) silver or (B) bronze Olympic/Paralympic medal; (NMS) not a Masters tournament; (NTI) not a Tier I tournament; (P) postponed; (NH) not held; (SR) strike rate (events won / competed); (W–L) win–loss record.
To avoid confusion and double counting, these charts are updated at the conclusion of a tournament or when the player's participation has ended.

Current through the 2026 Wimbledon Championships.

Tournament	2019	2020	2021	2022	2023	2024	2025	2026	SR	W–L	Win%
Grand Slam tournaments
Australian Open	A	2R	1R	QF	4R	W	W	SF	2 / 7	27–5	84%
French Open	A	QF	4R	4R	2R	SF	F	2R	0 / 7	23–7	77%
Wimbledon	Q1	NH	1R	QF	SF	QF	W	W	2 / 6	27–4	87%
US Open	1R	1R	4R	QF	4R	W	F	A	1 / 7	23–6	79%
Win–loss	0–1	5–3	6–4	15–4	12–4	23–2	26–2	13–2	5 / 27	100–22	82%
Year-end Championships
ATP Finals	DNQ		RR	DNQ	F	W	W	A (Note: Qualified but did not compete due to injury)	2 / 4	15–2	88%
National representation
Summer Olympics	not held		A	not held		A	not held		0 / 0	0–0	–
Davis Cup	A	NH	QF	SF	W	W	A	A	2 / 4	12–1	92%
ATP 1000 tournaments
Indian Wells Open	A	NH	4R	4R (Note: Sinner withdrew before the fourth round of the 2022 Indian Wells Masters, which does not officially count as a loss.)	SF	SF (Note: On 20 August 2024, it was announced that Sinner received an anti-doping sanction and was stripped of his money and points from the Indian Wells tournament in March, due to testing positive for Clostebol, a banned anabolic steroid.)	A	W	1 / 5	17–3	85%
Miami Open	A	NH	F	QF	F	W	A	W	2 / 5	25–3	89%
Monte-Carlo Masters	A	NH	2R	QF	SF	SF	A	W	1 / 5	15–4	79%
Madrid Open	A	NH	2R	3R	A	QF (Note: Sinner withdrew before the quarterfinals of the 2024 Madrid Open, which does not officially count as a loss.)	A	W	1 / 4	12–2	86%
Italian Open	2R	3R	2R	QF	4R	A	F	W	1 / 7	20–6	77%
Canadian Open	A	NH	2R	3R	W	QF	A	A	1 / 4	7–3	70%
Cincinnati Open	A	Q1	2R	3R	2R	W	F	A	1 / 5	12–4	75%
Shanghai Masters	A	not held			4R	W	3R	A	1 / 3	9–2	82%
Paris Masters	A	A	2R	1R	3R (Note: Sinner withdrew before the third round of the 2023 Paris Masters, which does not officially count as a loss.)	A	W	A	1 / 4	6–2	75%
Win–loss	1–1	2–1	10–8	16–7	21–6	28–3	16–3	29–0	10 / 42	123–29	81%
Career statistics
	2019	2020	2021	2022	2023	2024	2025	2026	Career		
Tournaments	10	12	25	17	21	15	12	9	Career total: 121		
Titles	0	1	4	1	4	8	6	6	Career total: 30		
Finals	0	1	5	1	7	9	10	6	Career total: 39		
Hard win–loss	8–5	12–8	39–14	28–10	48–9	53–3	39–3	19–2	23 / 77	246–54	82%
Clay win–loss	3–4	7–3	10–6	15–4	8–3	11–2	11–2	18–1	4 / 31	83–25	77%
Grass win–loss	0–1	0–0	0–2	4–2	8–3	9–1	8–1	7–0	3 / 13	36–10	78%
Overall win–loss	11–10	19–11	49–22	47–16	64–15	73–6	58–6	44–3	30 / 121	365–89	80%
Win %	52%	63%	69%	75%	81%	92%	91%	94%	Career total: 80%		
Year-end ranking	78	37	10	15	4	1	2	2	$70,675,661		

== Grand Slam tournaments finals ==
=== Singles: 7 (5 titles, 2 runner-ups) ===
Result	Year	Tournament	Surface	Opponent	Score
Win	2024	Australian Open	Hard	Daniil Medvedev	3–6, 3–6, 6–4, 6–4, 6–3
Win	2024	US Open	Hard	(United States) Taylor Fritz	6–3, 6–4, 7–5
Win	2025	Australian Open (2)	Hard	(Germany) Alexander Zverev	6–3, 7–6^{(7–4)}, 6–3
Loss	2025	French Open	Clay	(Spain) Carlos Alcaraz	6–4, 7–6^{(7–4)}, 4–6, 6–7^{(3–7)}, 6–7^{(2–10)}
Win	2025	Wimbledon	Grass	(Spain) Carlos Alcaraz	4–6, 6–4, 6–4, 6–4
Loss	2025	US Open	Hard	(Spain) Carlos Alcaraz	2–6, 6–3, 1–6, 4–6
Win	2026	Wimbledon (2)	Grass	(Germany) Alexander Zverev	6–7^{(7–9)}, 7–6^{(7–2)}, 6–3, 6–4

== Other significant finals ==
=== Year-end championships (ATP Finals) ===
==== Singles: 3 (2 titles, 1 runner-up) ====
Result	Year	Tournament	Surface	Opponent	Score
Loss	2023	ATP Finals	Hard (i)	(Serbia) Novak Djokovic	3–6, 3–6
Win	2024	ATP Finals	Hard (i)	(United States) Taylor Fritz	6–4, 6–4
Win	2025	ATP Finals (2)	Hard (i)	(Spain) Carlos Alcaraz	7–6^{(7–4)}, 7–5

=== ATP 1000 tournaments ===
==== Singles: 14 (10 titles, 4 runner-ups) ====
Result	Year	Tournament	Surface	Opponent	Score
Loss	2021	Miami Open	Hard	(Poland) Hubert Hurkacz	6–7^{(4–7)}, 4–6
Loss	2023	Miami Open	Hard	Daniil Medvedev	5–7, 3–6
Win	2023	Canadian Open	Hard	(Australia) Alex de Minaur	6–4, 6–1
Win	2024	Miami Open	Hard	(Bulgaria) Grigor Dimitrov	6–3, 6–1
Win	2024	Cincinnati Open	Hard	(United States) Frances Tiafoe	7–6^{(7–4)}, 6–2
Win	2024	Shanghai Masters	Hard	(Serbia) Novak Djokovic	7–6^{(7–4)}, 6–3
Loss	2025	Italian Open	Clay	(Spain) Carlos Alcaraz	6–7^{(5–7)}, 1–6
Loss	2025	Cincinnati Open	Hard	(Spain) Carlos Alcaraz	0–5 ret.
Win	2025	Paris Masters	Hard (i)	(Canada) Félix Auger-Aliassime	6–4, 7–6^{(7–4)}
Win	2026	Indian Wells Open	Hard	Daniil Medvedev	7–6^{(8–6)}, 7–6^{(7–4)}
Win	2026	Miami Open (2)	Hard	(Czech Republic) Jiří Lehečka	6–4, 6–4
Win	2026	Monte-Carlo Masters	Clay	(Spain) Carlos Alcaraz	7–6^{(7–5)}, 6–3
Win	2026	Madrid Open	Clay	(Germany) Alexander Zverev	6–1, 6–2
Win	2026	Italian Open	Clay	(Norway) Casper Ruud	6–4, 6–4

== ATP Tour finals ==
=== Singles: 39 (30 titles, 9 runner-ups) ===
Legend Grand Slam (5–2) ATP Finals (2–1) ATP 1000 (10–4) ATP 500 (7–2) ATP 250 (6–0)	Finals by surface Hard (23–7) Clay (4–2) Grass (3–0)	Finals by setting Outdoor (20–7) Indoor (10–2)

Result	W–L	Date	Tournament	Tier	Surface	Opponent	Score
Win	1–0	Nov 2020	Sofia Open, Bulgaria	ATP 250	Hard (i)	(Canada) Vasek Pospisil	6–4, 3–6, 7–6^{(7–3)}
Win	2–0	Feb 2021	Great Ocean Road Open, Australia	ATP 250	Hard	(Italy) Stefano Travaglia	7–6^{(7–4)}, 6–4
Loss	2–1	Apr 2021	Miami Open, US	ATP 1000	Hard	(Poland) Hubert Hurkacz	6–7^{(4–7)}, 4–6
Win	3–1	Jul 2021	Washington Open, US	ATP 500	Hard	(United States) Mackenzie McDonald	7–5, 4–6, 7–5
Win	4–1	Oct 2021	Sofia Open, Bulgaria (2)	ATP 250	Hard (i)	(France) Gaël Monfils	6–3, 6–4
Win	5–1	Oct 2021	European Open, Belgium	ATP 250	Hard (i)	(Argentina) Diego Schwartzman	6–2, 6–2
Win	6–1	Jul 2022	Croatia Open, Croatia	ATP 250	Clay	(Spain) Carlos Alcaraz	6–7^{(5–7)}, 6–1, 6–1
Win	7–1	Feb 2023	Open Sud de France, France	ATP 250	Hard (i)	(United States) Maxime Cressy	7–6^{(7–3)}, 6–3
Loss	7–2	Feb 2023	Rotterdam Open, Netherlands	ATP 500	Hard (i)	Daniil Medvedev	7–5, 2–6, 2–6
Loss	7–3	Mar 2023	Miami Open, US (2)	ATP 1000	Hard	Daniil Medvedev	5–7, 3–6
Win	8–3	Aug 2023	Canadian Open, Canada	ATP 1000	Hard	(Australia) Alex de Minaur	6–4, 6–1
Win	9–3	Oct 2023	China Open, China	ATP 500	Hard	Daniil Medvedev	7–6^{(7–2)}, 7–6^{(7–2)}
Win	10–3	Oct 2023	Vienna Open, Austria	ATP 500	Hard (i)	Daniil Medvedev	7–6^{(9–7)}, 4–6, 6–3
Loss	10–4	Nov 2023	ATP Finals, Italy	Finals	Hard (i)	(Serbia) Novak Djokovic	3–6, 3–6
Win	11–4	Jan 2024	Australian Open, Australia	Grand Slam	Hard	Daniil Medvedev	3–6, 3–6, 6–4, 6–4, 6–3
Win	12–4	Feb 2024	Rotterdam Open, Netherlands	ATP 500	Hard (i)	(Australia) Alex de Minaur	7–5, 6–4
Win	13–4	Mar 2024	Miami Open, US	ATP 1000	Hard	(Bulgaria) Grigor Dimitrov	6–3, 6–1
Win	14–4	Jun 2024	Halle Open, Germany	ATP 500	Grass	(Poland) Hubert Hurkacz	7–6^{(10–8)}, 7–6^{(7–2)}
Win	15–4	Aug 2024	Cincinnati Open, US	ATP 1000	Hard	(United States) Frances Tiafoe	7–6^{(7–4)}, 6–2
Win	16–4	Sep 2024	US Open, US	Grand Slam	Hard	(United States) Taylor Fritz	6–3, 6–4, 7–5
Loss	16–5	Oct 2024	China Open, China	ATP 500	Hard	(Spain) Carlos Alcaraz	7–6^{(8–6)}, 4–6, 6–7^{(3–7)}
Win	17–5	Oct 2024	Shanghai Masters, China	ATP 1000	Hard	(Serbia) Novak Djokovic	7–6^{(7–4)}, 6–3
Win	18–5	Nov 2024	ATP Finals, Italy	Finals	Hard (i)	(United States) Taylor Fritz	6–4, 6–4
Win	19–5	Jan 2025	Australian Open, Australia (2)	Grand Slam	Hard	(Germany) Alexander Zverev	6–3, 7–6^{(7–4)}, 6–3
Loss	19–6	May 2025	Italian Open, Italy	ATP 1000	Clay	(Spain) Carlos Alcaraz	6–7^{(5–7)}, 1–6
Loss	19–7	Jun 2025	French Open, France	Grand Slam	Clay	(Spain) Carlos Alcaraz	6–4, 7–6^{(7–4)}, 4–6, 6–7^{(3–7)}, 6–7^{(2–10)}
Win	20–7	Jul 2025	Wimbledon, UK	Grand Slam	Grass	(Spain) Carlos Alcaraz	4–6, 6–4, 6–4, 6–4
Loss	20–8	Aug 2025	Cincinnati Open, US	ATP 1000	Hard	(Spain) Carlos Alcaraz	0–5 ret.
Loss	20–9	Sep 2025	US Open, US	Grand Slam	Hard	(Spain) Carlos Alcaraz	2–6, 6–3, 1–6, 4–6
Win	21–9	Sep 2025	China Open, China (2)	ATP 500	Hard	(United States) Learner Tien	6–2, 6–2
Win	22–9	Oct 2025	Vienna Open, Austria (2)	ATP 500	Hard (i)	(Germany) Alexander Zverev	3–6, 6–3, 7–5
Win	23–9	Nov 2025	Paris Masters, France	ATP 1000	Hard (i)	(Canada) Félix Auger-Aliassime	6–4, 7–6^{(7–4)}
Win	24–9	Nov 2025	ATP Finals, Italy (2)	Finals	Hard (i)	(Spain) Carlos Alcaraz	7–6^{(7–4)}, 7–5
Win	25–9	Mar 2026	Indian Wells Open, US	ATP 1000	Hard	Daniil Medvedev	7–6^{(8–6)}, 7–6^{(7–4)}
Win	26–9	Mar 2026	Miami Open, US (2)	ATP 1000	Hard	(Czech Republic) Jiří Lehečka	6–4, 6–4
Win	27–9	Apr 2026	Monte-Carlo Masters, France	ATP 1000	Clay	(Spain) Carlos Alcaraz	7–6^{(7–5)}, 6–3
Win	28–9	May 2026	Madrid Open, Spain	ATP 1000	Clay	(Germany) Alexander Zverev	6–1, 6–2
Win	29–9	May 2026	Italian Open, Italy	ATP 1000	Clay	(Norway) Casper Ruud	6–4, 6–4
Win	30–9	Jul 2026	Wimbledon, United Kingdom (2)	Grand Slam	Grass	(Germany) Alexander Zverev	6–7^{(7–9)}, 7–6^{(7–2)}, 6–3, 6–4

=== Doubles: 1 (title) ===
Legend Grand Slam (–) ATP 1000 (–) ATP 500 (–) ATP 250 (1–0)	Finals by surface Hard (1–0) Clay (–) Grass (–)	Finals by setting Outdoor (1–0) Indoor (–)

Result	W–L	Date	Tournament	Tier	Surface	Partner	Opponents	Score
Win	1–0	Jul 2021	Atlanta Open, US	ATP 250	Hard	(United States) Reilly Opelka	(United States) Steve Johnson (Australia) Jordan Thompson	6–4, 6–7^{(6–8)}, [10–3]

== Next Gen ATP finals ==
=== Singles: 1 (title) ===
Result	Date	Tournament	Surface	Opponent	Score
Win	Nov 2019	Next Gen ATP Finals, Italy	Hard (i)	(Australia) Alex de Minaur	4–2, 4–1, 4–2

== ATP Challenger Tour finals ==
=== Singles: 4 (3 titles, 1 runner-up) ===
Finals by surface
Hard (3–0)
Clay (0–1)

Result	W–L	Date	Tournament	Surface	Opponent	Score
Win	1–0	Feb 2019	Trofeo Faip-Perrel, Italy	Hard (i)	(Italy) Roberto Marcora	6–3, 6–1
Loss	1–1	May 2019	Prosperita Open, Czech Republic	Clay	(Poland) Kamil Majchrzak	1–6, 0–6
Win	2–1	Aug 2019	Lexington Challenger, US	Hard	(Australia) Alex Bolt	6–4, 3–6, 6–4
Win	3–1	Nov 2019	Sparkassen ATP Challenger, Italy	Hard (i)	(Austria) Sebastian Ofner	6–2, 6–4

== ITF Futures/World Tennis Tour finals ==
=== Singles: 3 (2 titles, 1 runner-up) ===
Result	W–L	Date	Tournament	Surface	Opponent	Score
Loss	0–1	Aug 2018	F23 Santa Cristina Gherdëina, Italy	Clay	(Germany) Peter Heller	1–6, 3–6
Win	1–1	Mar 2019	M25 Trento, Italy	Hard (i)	(Germany) Jeremy Jahn	6–3, 6–4
Win	2–1	Mar 2019	M25 Santa Margherita di Pula, Italy	Clay	(Italy) Andrea Pellegrino	6–1, 6–1

=== Doubles: 1 (title) ===
Result	W–L	Date	Tournament	Surface	Partner	Opponents	Score
Win	1–0	Aug 2018	F23 Santa Cristina Gherdëina, Italy	Clay	(Italy) Giacomo Dambrosi	(France) Maxime Mora (Italy) Nicolò Turchetti	6–2, 7–6^{(7–4)}

== ATP ranking ==
Jannik Sinner has spent in total 95 weeks as ATP world No. 1.

=== General ===
Year	2018	2019	2020	2021	2022	2023	2024	2025	2026	2027
High	551	78	37	9	10	4	1	1	1	
Low	1592	553	82	36	15	17	4	2	2	
End	551	78	37	10	15	4	1	2	2	

Weeks in top	Total weeks
at number 1	95
top 5	164*
top 10	212*
top 20	284*
top 50	319*
top 100	347*

*as of 16 November 2026.

==== Weeks at No. 1 by span ====
Stint	Start date	End date	Weeks	Total
1	10 June 2024	7 September 2025	65	65
2	3 November 2025	9 November 2025	1	66
3	13 April 2026	1 November 2026	29	95

=== Age at first and last dates No. 1 ranking was held ===
Birthdate	Age first held No. 1	Age last held No. 1
16 August 2001 (age 25)	22 years, 299 days	25 years, 77 days

=== ATP world No. 1 ranking ===
==== No. 1 stats ====
Category	Weeks/ Times (years)
Overall Weeks at No. 1	95
Consecutive Weeks at No. 1 highest streak	65
Year-end No. 1	1 (2024)
Year-end No. 1 consecutive streak	1 (2024)

== Career Grand Slam statistics ==
=== Career Grand Slam tournament seedings ===
The tournaments won by Sinner are in boldface.

Legend seeded No. 1 (**4** / 8) seeded No. 2 (0 / 2) seeded No. 3 (0 / 0) seeded No. 4–10 (**1** / 5) seeded No. 11–32 (0 / 7) unseeded (0 / 5)	Longest / total: 6 / 27; 1 / 27; 0 / 27; 4 / 27; 5 / 27; 5 / 27

Season	Australian Open	French Open	Wimbledon	US Open
2019	did not play	did not play	did not qualify	qualifier
2020	not seeded	not seeded	cancelled	not seeded
2021	not seeded	18th	19th	13th
2022	11th	11th	10th	11th
2023	15th	8th	8th	6th
2024	**4th**	2nd	1st	**1st**
2025	**1st**	1st	**1st**	1st
2026	2nd	1st	**1st**	did not play
2027				

=== Best Grand Slam tournament results details ===
Grand Slam tournament winners are in boldface, and runner-ups are in italics.

Australian Open
2024 Australian Open (4th seed)
Round	Opponent	Rank	Score
1R	(Netherlands) Botic van de Zandschulp	59	6–4, 7–5, 6–3
2R	(Netherlands) Jesper de Jong (Q)	161	6–2, 6–2, 6–2
3R	(Argentina) Sebastián Báez (26)	29	6–0, 6–1, 6–3
4R	Karen Khachanov (15)	15	6–4, 7–5, 6–3
QF	Andrey Rublev (5)	**5**	6–4, 7–6^{(7–5)}, 6–3
SF	(Serbia) Novak Djokovic (1)	**1**	6–1, 6–2, 6–7^{(6–8)}, 6–3
**W**	Daniil Medvedev (3)	**3**	3–6, 3–6, 6–4, 6–4, 6–3
2025 Australian Open (1st seed)
Round	Opponent	Rank	Score
1R	(Chile) Nicolás Jarry	36	7–6^{(7–2)}, 7–6^{(7–5)}, 6–1
2R	(Australia) Tristan Schoolkate (WC)	173	4–6, 6–4, 6–1, 6–3
3R	(United States) Marcos Giron	46	6–3, 6–4, 6–2
4R	(Denmark) Holger Rune (13)	13	6–3, 3–6, 6–3, 6–2
QF	(Australia) Alex de Minaur (8)	**8**	6–3, 6–2, 6–1
SF	(United States) Ben Shelton (21)	20	7–6^{(7–2)}, 6–2, 6–2
**W**	(Germany) Alexander Zverev (2)	**2**	6–3, 7–6^{(7–4)}, 6–3

Wimbledon
2025 Wimbledon (1st seed)
Round	Opponent	Rank	Score
1R	(Italy) Luca Nardi	95	6–4, 6–3, 6–0
2R	(Australia) Aleksandar Vukic	93	6–1, 6–1, 6–3
3R	(Spain) Pedro Martínez	52	6–1, 6–3, 6–1
4R	(Bulgaria) Grigor Dimitrov (19)	21	3–6, 5–7, 2–2 ret.
QF	(United States) Ben Shelton (10)	**10**	7–6^{(7–2)}, 6–4, 6–4
SF	(Serbia) Novak Djokovic (6)	**6**	6–3, 6–3, 6–4
**W**	(Spain) Carlos Alcaraz (2)	**2**	4–6, 6–4, 6–4, 6–4
2026 Wimbledon (1st seed)
Round	Opponent	Rank	Score
1R	(Serbia) Miomir Kecmanović	50	4–6, 6–3, 6–7^{(6–8)}, 6–2, 6–3
2R	(Portugal) Nuno Borges	48	7–6^{(7–4)}, 7–6^{(7–2)}, 6–4
3R	(United States) Jenson Brooksby	81	6–4, 6–3, 6–4
4R	(Japan) Shintaro Mochizuki (Q)	151	6–3, 7–6^{(7–0)}, 6–3
QF	(Germany) Jan-Lennard Struff	74	7–5, 7–6^{(7–4)}, 6–3
SF	(Serbia) Novak Djokovic (7)	**8**	6–4, 6–4, 6–4
**W**	(Germany) Alexander Zverev (2)	**3**	6–7^{(7–9)}, 7–6^{(7–2)}, 6–3, 6–4

French Open
2025 French Open (1st seed)
Round	Opponent	Rank	Score
1R	(France) Arthur Rinderknech	75	6–4, 6–3, 7–5
2R	(France) Richard Gasquet (WC)	166	6–3, 6–0, 6–4
3R	(Czech Republic) Jiří Lehečka	34	6–0, 6–1, 6–2
4R	Andrey Rublev (17)	15	6–1, 6–3, 6–4
QF	(Kazakhstan) Alexander Bublik	62	6–1, 7–5, 6–0
SF	(Serbia) Novak Djokovic (6)	**6**	6–4, 7–5, 7–6^{(7–3)}
F	**(Spain) Carlos Alcaraz (2)**	**2**	6–4, 7–6^{(7–4)}, 4–6, 6–7^{(3–7)}, 6–7^{(2–10)}

US Open
2024 US Open (1st seed)
Round	Opponent	Rank	Score
1R	(United States) Mackenzie McDonald	140	2–6, 6–2, 6–1, 6–2
2R	(United States) Alex Michelsen	49	6–4, 6–0, 6–2
3R	(Australia) Christopher O'Connell	87	6–1, 6–4, 6–2
4R	(United States) Tommy Paul (14)	14	7–6^{(7–3)}, 7–6^{(7–5)}, 6–1
QF	Daniil Medvedev (5)	**5**	6–2, 1–6, 6–1, 6–4
SF	(United Kingdom) Jack Draper (25)	25	7–5, 7–6^{(7–3)}, 6–2
**W**	(United States) Taylor Fritz (12)	12	6–3, 6–4, 7–5

== Wins over top 10 players ==
- Sinner has a 69–37 (65.1%) record against players who were, at the time the match was played, ranked in the top 10.

Season	2020	2021	2022	2023	2024	2025	2026	Total
Wins	3	3	3	13	18	19	10	69

#	Opponent	Rk	Event	Surface	Rd	Score	Rk	Ref
2020
1.	(Belgium) David Goffin	10	Rotterdam Open, Netherlands	Hard (i)	2R	7–6^{(9–7)}, 7–5	79	
2.	(Greece) Stefanos Tsitsipas	6	Italian Open, Italy	Clay	2R	6–1, 6–7^{(9–11)}, 6–2	81	
3.	(Germany) Alexander Zverev	7	French Open, France	Clay	4R	6–3, 6–3, 4–6, 6–3	75	
2021
4.	(Russia) Andrey Rublev	7	Barcelona Open, Spain	Clay	QF	6–2, 7–6^{(8–6)}	19	
5.	(Norway) Casper Ruud	8	Vienna Open, Austria	Hard (i)	QF	7–5, 6–1	11	
6.	(Poland) Hubert Hurkacz	9	ATP Finals, Italy	Hard (i)	RR	6–2, 6–2	11	
2022
7.	Andrey Rublev	8	Monte-Carlo Masters, France	Clay	3R	5–7, 6–1, 6–3	12	
8.	(Spain) Carlos Alcaraz	7	Wimbledon, United Kingdom	Grass	4R	6–1, 6–4, 6–7^{(8–10)}, 6–3	13	
9.	(Spain) Carlos Alcaraz	5	Croatia Open, Croatia	Clay	F	6–7^{(5–7)}, 6–1, 6–1	10	
2023
10.	(Greece) Stefanos Tsitsipas	3	Rotterdam Open, Netherlands	Hard (i)	2R	6–4, 6–3	14	
11.	(United States) Taylor Fritz	5	Indian Wells Open, United States	Hard	QF	6–4, 4–6, 6–4	13	
12.	Andrey Rublev	7	Miami Open, United States	Hard	4R	6–2, 6–4	11	
13.	(Spain) Carlos Alcaraz	1	Miami Open, United States	Hard	SF	6–7^{(4–7)}, 6–4, 6–2	11	
14.	(Spain) Carlos Alcaraz	2	China Open, China	Hard	SF	7–6^{(7–4)}, 6–1	7	
15.	Daniil Medvedev	3	China Open, China	Hard	F	7–6^{(7–2)}, 7–6^{(7–2)}	7	
16.	Andrey Rublev	5	Vienna Open, Austria	Hard (i)	SF	7–5, 7–6^{(7–5)}	4	
17.	Daniil Medvedev	3	Vienna Open, Austria	Hard (i)	F	7–6^{(9–7)}, 4–6, 6–3	4	
18.	(Greece) Stefanos Tsitsipas	6	ATP Finals, Italy	Hard (i)	RR	6–4, 6–4	4	
19.	(Serbia) Novak Djokovic	1	ATP Finals, Italy	Hard (i)	RR	7–5, 6–7^{(5–7)}, 7–6^{(7–2)}	4	
20.	(Denmark) Holger Rune	8	ATP Finals, Italy	Hard (i)	RR	6–2, 5–7, 6–4	4	
21.	Daniil Medvedev	3	ATP Finals, Italy	Hard (i)	SF	6–3, 6–7^{(4–7)}, 6–1	4	
22.	(Serbia) Novak Djokovic	1	Davis Cup, Spain	Hard (i)	SF	6–2, 2–6, 7–5	4	
2024
23.	Andrey Rublev	5	Australian Open, Australia	Hard	QF	6–4, 7–6^{(7–5)}, 6–3	4	
24.	(Serbia) Novak Djokovic	1	Australian Open, Australia	Hard	SF	6–1, 6–2, 6–7^{(6–8)}, 6–3	4	
25.	Daniil Medvedev	3	Australian Open, Australia	Hard	F	3–6, 3–6, 6–4, 6–4, 6–3	4	
26.	Daniil Medvedev	4	Miami Open, United States	Hard	SF	6–1, 6–2	3	
27.	(Denmark) Holger Rune	7	Monte-Carlo Masters, France	Clay	QF	6–4, 6–7^{(6–8)}, 6–3	2	
28.	(Bulgaria) Grigor Dimitrov	10	French Open, France	Clay	QF	6–2, 6–4, 7–6^{(7–3)}	2	
29.	(Poland) Hubert Hurkacz	9	Halle Open, Germany	Grass	F	7–6^{(10–8)}, 7–6^{(7–2)}	1	
30.	Andrey Rublev	6	Cincinnati Open, United States	Hard	QF	4–6, 7–5, 6–4	1	
31.	(Germany) Alexander Zverev	4	Cincinnati Open, United States	Hard	SF	7–6^{(11–9)}, 5–7, 7–6^{(7–4)}	1	
32.	Daniil Medvedev	5	US Open, United States	Hard	QF	6–2, 1–6, 6–1, 6–4	1	
33.	Daniil Medvedev	5	Shanghai Masters, China	Hard	QF	6–1, 6–4	1	
34.	(Serbia) Novak Djokovic	4	Shanghai Masters, China	Hard	F	7–6^{(7–4)}, 6–3	1	
35.	(Australia) Alex de Minaur	9	ATP Finals, Italy	Hard (i)	RR	6–3, 6–4	1	
36.	(United States) Taylor Fritz	5	ATP Finals, Italy	Hard (i)	RR	6–4, 6–4	1	
37.	Daniil Medvedev	4	ATP Finals, Italy	Hard (i)	RR	6–3, 6–4	1	
38.	(Norway) Casper Ruud	7	ATP Finals, Italy	Hard (i)	SF	6–1, 6–2	1	
39.	(United States) Taylor Fritz	5	ATP Finals, Italy	Hard (i)	F	6–4, 6–4	1	
40.	(Australia) Alex de Minaur	9	Davis Cup, Spain	Hard (i)	SF	6–3, 6–4	1	
2025
41.	(Australia) Alex de Minaur	8	Australian Open, Australia	Hard	QF	6–3, 6–2, 6–1	1	
42.	(Germany) Alexander Zverev	2	Australian Open, Australia	Hard	F	6–3, 7–6^{(7–4)}, 6–3	1	
43.	(Norway) Casper Ruud	7	Italian Open, Italy	Clay	QF	6–0, 6–1	1	
44.	(Serbia) Novak Djokovic	6	French Open, France	Clay	SF	6–4, 7–5, 7–6^{(7–3)}	1	
45.	(United States) Ben Shelton	10	Wimbledon, United Kingdom	Grass	QF	7–6^{(7–2)}, 6–4, 6–4	1	
46.	(Serbia) Novak Djokovic	6	Wimbledon, United Kingdom	Grass	SF	6–3, 6–3, 6–4	1	
47.	(Spain) Carlos Alcaraz	2	Wimbledon, United Kingdom	Grass	F	4–6, 6–4, 6–4, 6–4	1	
48.	(Italy) Lorenzo Musetti	10	US Open, United States	Hard	QF	6–1, 6–4, 6–2	1	
49.	(Australia) Alex de Minaur	8	China Open, China	Hard	SF	6–3, 4–6, 6–2	2	
50.	(Australia) Alex de Minaur	7	Vienna Open, Austria	Hard (i)	SF	6–3, 6–4	2	
51.	(Germany) Alexander Zverev	3	Vienna Open, Austria	Hard (i)	F	3–6, 6–3, 7–5	2	
52.	(United States) Ben Shelton	7	Paris Masters, France	Hard (i)	QF	6–3, 6–3	2	
53.	(Germany) Alexander Zverev	3	Paris Masters, France	Hard (i)	SF	6–0, 6–1	2	
54.	(Canada) Félix Auger-Aliassime	10	Paris Masters, France	Hard (i)	F	6–4, 7–6^{(7–4)}	2	
55.	(Canada) Félix Auger-Aliassime	8	ATP Finals, Italy	Hard (i)	RR	7–5, 6–1	2	
56.	(Germany) Alexander Zverev	3	ATP Finals, Italy	Hard (i)	RR	6–4, 6–3	2	
57.	(United States) Ben Shelton	5	ATP Finals, Italy	Hard (i)	RR	6–3, 7–6^{(7–3)}	2	
58.	(Australia) Alex de Minaur	7	ATP Finals, Italy	Hard (i)	SF	7–5, 6–2	2	
59.	(Spain) Carlos Alcaraz	1	ATP Finals, Italy	Hard (i)	F	7–6^{(7–4)}, 7–5	2	
2026
60.	(United States) Ben Shelton	7	Australian Open, Australia	Hard	QF	6–3, 6–4, 6–4	2	
61.	(Germany) Alexander Zverev	4	Indian Wells Open, United States	Hard	SF	6–2, 6–4	2	
62.	(Germany) Alexander Zverev	4	Miami Open, United States	Hard	SF	6–3, 7–6^{(7–4)}	2	
63.	(Canada) Félix Auger-Aliassime	7	Monte-Carlo Masters, France	Clay	QF	6–3, 6–4	2	
64.	(Germany) Alexander Zverev	3	Monte-Carlo Masters, France	Clay	SF	6–1, 6–4	2	
65.	(Spain) Carlos Alcaraz	1	Monte-Carlo Masters, France	Clay	F	7–6^{(7–5)}, 6–3	2	
66.	(Germany) Alexander Zverev	3	Madrid Open, Spain	Clay	F	6–1, 6–2	1	
67.	Daniil Medvedev	9	Italian Open, Italy	Clay	SF	6–2, 5–7, 6–4	1	
68.	(Serbia) Novak Djokovic	8	Wimbledon, United Kingdom	Grass	SF	6–4, 6–4, 6–4	1	
69.	(Germany) Alexander Zverev	3	Wimbledon, United Kingdom	Grass	F	6–7^{(7–9)}, 7–6^{(7–2)}, 6–3, 6–4	1	

- Key: (Rk) first use, opponent rank; (Rd) round; (Rk) 2nd use, player rank; (Ref) reference; (F) final; (SF) semifinal; (QF) quarterfinal; (#R) rounds 4, 3, 2, 1; (RR) round-robin stage; (Q#) qualifying rounds or stages (3), 2, 1.

== ATP Tour career earnings ==
Year	Majors	ATP wins	Total wins	Earnings ($)	Money list rank
2015	0	0	0	$36	n/a
2016	0	0	0	$108	3585
2017	0	0	0	$0	n/a
2018	0	0	0	$9,955	876
2019	0	0	0	$643,358	98
2020	0	1	1	$736,791	34
2021	0	4	4	$2,233,199	10
2022	0	1	1	$2,855,466	14
2023	0	4	4	$10,456,264	4
2024	2	6	8	$19,735,703	1
2025	2	4	6	$19,120,641	2
2026	1	5	6	$11,607,775	2
Career*	5	25	30	$69,478,291	5

* Statistics correct as of 19 October 2026.

== National and international representation ==
=== Davis Cup (15–3) ===
Group membership World Group / Finals (15–3)	Matches by surface Hard (15–3)	Matches by type Singles (12–1) Doubles (3–2)	Matches by setting Indoors (15–3)	Matches by venue Italy (4–2) Away (11–1)

- ▲ ▼ indicates the result of the Davis Cup match followed by the score, date, place of event, the zonal classification and its phase, and the court surface.

Result	No.	Rubber	Match type (partner if any)	Opponent nation	Opponent player(s)	Score
▲2–1; 26 November 2021; Pala Alpitour, Turin, Italy; Davis Cup Finals – roun robin; hard (i) surface
Win	1	II	Singles	United States	John Isner	6–2, 6–0
▲2–1; 27 November 2021; Pala Alpitour, Turin, Italy; Davis Cup Finals – round robin; hard (i) surface
Win	2	II	Singles	Colombia	Daniel Elahi Galán	7–5, 6–0
▼1–2; 29 November 2021; Pala Alpitour, Turin, Italy; Davis Cup Finals – quarterfinals; hard (i) surface
Win	3	II	Singles	Croatia	Marin Čilić	3–6, 7–6^{(7–4)}, 6–3
Loss	4	III	Doubles (with Fabio Fognini)	Croatia	Nikola Mektić / Mate Pavić	3–6, 4–6
▲3–2; 4–5 March 2022; AXA Aréna NTC, Bratislava, Slovakia; Davis Cup Finals – qualifying round; hard (i) surface
Win	5	I	Singles	Slovakia	Norbert Gombos	6–4, 4–6, 6–4
Loss	6	III	Doubles (with Simone Bolelli)	Slovakia	Filip Polášek / Igor Zelenay	3–6, 6–1, 7–6^{(7–3)}
Win	7	IV	Singles	Slovakia	Filip Horanský	7–5, 6–4
▲2–1; 16 September 2022; Unipol Arena, Bologna, Italy; Davis Cup Finals – round robin; hard (i) surface
Win	8	II	Singles	Argentina	Francisco Cerúndolo	7–5, 1–6, 6–3
▲2–1; 18 September 2022; Unipol Arena, Bologna, Italy; Davis Cup Finals – round robin; hard (i) surface
Loss	9	II	Singles	Sweden	Mikael Ymer	4–6, 6–3, 3–6
▲2–1; 23 November 2023; Martín Carpena Arena, Málaga, Spain; Davis Cup Finals – quarterfinals; hard (i) surface
Win	10	II	Singles	Netherlands	Tallon Griekspoor	7–6^{(7–3)}, 6–1
Win	11	III	Doubles (with Lorenzo Sonego)	Netherlands	Tallon Griekspoor / Wesley Koolhof	6–3, 6–4
▲2–1; 25 November 2023; Martín Carpena Arena, Málaga, Spain; Davis Cup Finals – semifinals; hard (i) surface
Win	12	II	Singles	Serbia	Novak Djokovic	6–2, 2–6, 7–5
Win	13	III	Doubles (with Lorenzo Sonego)	Serbia	Novak Djokovic / Miomir Kecmanović	6–3, 6–4
▲2–0; 26 November 2023; Martín Carpena Arena, Málaga, Spain; Davis Cup Finals – final; hard (i) surface
Win	14	II	Singles	Australia	Alex de Minaur	6–3, 6–0
▲2–1; 21 November 2024; Martín Carpena Arena, Málaga, Spain; Davis Cup Finals – quarterfinals; hard (i) surface
Win	15	II	Singles	Argentina	Sebastián Báez	6–2, 6–1
Win	16	III	Doubles (with Matteo Berrettini)	Argentina	Máximo González / Andrés Molteni	6–4, 7–5
▲2–0; 23 November 2024; Martín Carpena Arena, Málaga, Spain; Davis Cup Finals – semifinals; hard (i) surface
Win	17	II	Singles	Australia	Alex de Minaur	6–3, 6–4
▲2–0; 24 November 2024; Martín Carpena Arena, Málaga, Spain; Davis Cup Finals – final; hard (i) surface
Win	18	II	Singles	Netherlands	Tallon Griekspoor	7–6^{(7–2)}, 6–2

==== Wins: 2 ====
Edition	(Italy) Italian team	Rounds/Opponents
2023 Davis Cup	Jannik Sinner; Lorenzo Musetti; Matteo Arnaldi; Lorenzo Sonego; Simone Bolelli	RR: CAN 3–0 ITA; RR: ITA 3–0 CHI; RR: ITA 2–1 SWE; QF: ITA 2–1 NED; SF: ITA 2–1 SRB; F: AUS 0–2 ITA
2024 Davis Cup	Jannik Sinner; Lorenzo Musetti; Matteo Berrettini; Simone Bolelli; Andrea Vavassori	RR: ITA 2–1 BRA; RR: ITA 2–1 BEL; RR: ITA 2–1 NED; QF: ITA 2–1 ARG; SF: ITA 2–0 AUS; F: ITA 2–0 NED

== Exhibition Finals ==
==== Singles: 2 (2 titles) ====
Result	W–L	Date	Tournament	Surface	Opponent	Score
Win	1–0	Oct 2024	Six Kings Slam, Riyadh, Saudi Arabia	Hard (i)	(Spain) Carlos Alcaraz	6–7^{(5–7)}, 6–3, 6–3
Win	2–0	Oct 2025	Six Kings Slam, Riyadh, Saudi Arabia (2)	Hard (i)	(Spain) Carlos Alcaraz	6–2, 6–4

== Exhibition matches ==
=== Singles ===
Result	Date	Tournament	Surface	Opponent	Score
Loss	Jan 2021	A Day at The Drive, Adelaide, Australia	Hard	(Serbia) Filip Krajinović	3–6
Loss	Jan 2021	A Day at The Drive, Adelaide, Australia	Hard	(Serbia) Novak Djokovic	3–6
Win	Jan 2024	Kooyong Classic, Melbourne, Australia	Hard	(Australia) Marc Polmans	6–4, 6–0
Win	Jan 2024	Kooyong Classic, Melbourne, Australia	Hard	(Norway) Casper Ruud	6–2, 6–3
Win	Oct 2024	6 Kings Slam, Riyadh, Saudi Arabia	Hard (i)	Daniil Medvedev	6–0, 6–3
Win	Oct 2024	6 Kings Slam, Riyadh, Saudi Arabia	Hard (i)	(Serbia) Novak Djokovic	6–2, 6–7^{(0–7)}, 6–4
Win	Oct 2024	6 Kings Slam, Riyadh, Saudi Arabia	Hard (i)	(Spain) Carlos Alcaraz	6–7^{(5–7)}, 6–3, 6–3
Win	Jan 2025	Australian Open Opening Week, Melbourne, Australia	Hard	(Australia) Alexei Popyrin	6–4, 7–6^{(7–2)}
Win	Jan 2025	Australian Open Opening Week, Melbourne, Australia	Hard	(Greece) Stefanos Tsitsipas	6–3, 7–6^{(7–5)}
Win	Oct 2025	6 Kings Slam, Riyadh, Saudi Arabia (2)	Hard (i)	(Greece) Stefanos Tsitsipas	6–2, 6–3
Win	Oct 2025	6 Kings Slam, Riyadh, Saudi Arabia (2)	Hard (i)	(Serbia) Novak Djokovic	6–4, 6–2
Win	Oct 2025	6 Kings Slam, Riyadh, Saudi Arabia (2)	Hard (i)	(Spain) Carlos Alcaraz	6–2, 6–4
Loss	Jan 2026	Hyundai Card Super Match, Seoul, South Korea	Hard (i)	(Spain) Carlos Alcaraz	5–7, 6–7^{(6–8)}
Win	Jan 2026	Australian Open Opening Week, Melbourne, Australia	Hard	(Canada) Félix Auger-Aliassime	6–4, 4–6, [10–4]
Win	Jun 2026	Giorgio Armani Tennis Classic, London, United Kingdom	Grass	(United Kingdom) Cameron Norrie	6–3, 6–3

== Longest winning streaks ==
Sinner has had 3 20+ match win streaks in his career: 30 (2026), 26 (2024–25), 20 (2025–26).

=== 30-match win streak (2026) ===
No.	Tournament	Tier	Start date	Surface	Round	Opponent	Rank	Score
–	Qatar Open	ATP 500	19 February 2026	Hard	QF	(Czech Republic) Jakub Menšík (2)	16	6–7^{(3–7)}, 6–2, 3–6
–	Indian Wells Open	ATP 1000	6 March 2026	Hard	1R	Bye		
1	Indian Wells Open	ATP 1000	6 March 2026	Hard	2R	(Czech Republic) Dalibor Svrčina (Q)	109	6–1, 6–1
2	Indian Wells Open	ATP 1000	6 March 2026	Hard	3R	(Canada) Denis Shapovalov	39	6–3, 6–2
3	Indian Wells Open	ATP 1000	6 March 2026	Hard	4R	(Brazil) João Fonseca	35	7–6^{(8–6)}, 7–6^{(7–4)}
4	Indian Wells Open	ATP 1000	6 March 2026	Hard	QF	(United States) Learner Tien (25)	27	6–1, 6–2
5	Indian Wells Open	ATP 1000	6 March 2026	Hard	SF	(Germany) Alexander Zverev (4)	4	6–2, 6–4
6	Indian Wells Open	ATP 1000	6 March 2026	Hard	F	Daniil Medvedev (11)	11	7–6^{(8–6)}, 7–6^{(7–4)}
–	Miami Open	ATP 1000	21 March 2026	Hard	1R	Bye		
7	Miami Open	ATP 1000	21 March 2026	Hard	2R	(Bosnia and Herzegovina) Damir Džumhur	76	6–3, 6–3
8	Miami Open	ATP 1000	21 March 2026	Hard	3R	(France) Corentin Moutet (30)	33	6–1, 6–4
9	Miami Open	ATP 1000	21 March 2026	Hard	4R	(United States) Alex Michelsen	40	7–5, 7–6^{(7–4)}
10	Miami Open	ATP 1000	21 March 2026	Hard	QF	(United States) Frances Tiafoe (19)	20	6–2, 6–2
11	Miami Open	ATP 1000	21 March 2026	Hard	SF	(Germany) Alexander Zverev (3)	4	6–3, 7–6^{(7–4)}
12	Miami Open	ATP 1000	21 March 2026	Hard	F	(Czech Republic) Jiří Lehečka (21)	22	6–4, 6–4
–	Monte-Carlo Masters	ATP 1000	7 April 2026	Clay	1R	Bye		
13	Monte-Carlo Masters	ATP 1000	7 April 2026	Clay	2R	(France) Ugo Humbert	34	6–3, 6–0
14	Monte-Carlo Masters	ATP 1000	7 April 2026	Clay	3R	(Czech Republic) Tomáš Macháč	53	6–1, 6–7^{(3–7)}, 6–3
15	Monte-Carlo Masters	ATP 1000	7 April 2026	Clay	QF	(Canada) Félix Auger-Aliassime (6)	7	6–3, 6–4
16	Monte-Carlo Masters	ATP 1000	7 April 2026	Clay	SF	(Germany) Alexander Zverev (3)	3	6–1, 6–4
17	Monte-Carlo Masters	ATP 1000	7 April 2026	Clay	F	(Spain) Carlos Alcaraz (1)	1	7–6^{(7–5)}, 6–3
–	Madrid Open	ATP 1000	24 April 2026	Clay	1R	Bye		
18	Madrid Open	ATP 1000	24 April 2026	Clay	2R	(France) Benjamin Bonzi (Q)	104	6–7^{(6–8)}, 6–1, 6–4
19	Madrid Open	ATP 1000	24 April 2026	Clay	3R	(Denmark) Elmer Møller (Q)	169	6–2, 6–3
20	Madrid Open	ATP 1000	24 April 2026	Clay	4R	(United Kingdom) Cameron Norrie (19)	23	6–2, 7–5
21	Madrid Open	ATP 1000	24 April 2026	Clay	QF	(Spain) Rafael Jódar (WC)	42	6–2, 7–6^{(7–0)}
22	Madrid Open	ATP 1000	24 April 2026	Clay	SF	(France) Arthur Fils (21)	25	6–2, 6–4
23	Madrid Open	ATP 1000	24 April 2026	Clay	F	(Germany) Alexander Zverev (2)	3	6–1, 6–2
–	Italian Open	ATP 1000	9 May 2026	Clay	1R	Bye		
24	Italian Open	ATP 1000	9 May 2026	Clay	2R	(Austria) Sebastian Ofner	82	6–3, 6–4
25	Italian Open	ATP 1000	9 May 2026	Clay	3R	(Australia) Alexei Popyrin	60	6–2, 6–0
26	Italian Open	ATP 1000	9 May 2026	Clay	4R	(Italy) Andrea Pellegrino (Q)	155	6–2, 6–3
27	Italian Open	ATP 1000	9 May 2026	Clay	QF	Andrey Rublev (12)	14	6–2, 6–4
28	Italian Open	ATP 1000	9 May 2026	Clay	SF	Daniil Medvedev (7)	9	6–2, 5–7, 6–4
29	Italian Open	ATP 1000	9 May 2026	Clay	F	(Norway) Casper Ruud (23)	25	6–4, 6–4
30	French Open	Grand Slam	25 May 2026	Clay	1R	(France) Clément Tabur (WC)	165	6–1, 6–3, 6–4
–	French Open	Grand Slam	25 May 2026	Clay	2R	(Argentina) Juan Manuel Cerúndolo	54	6–3, 6–2, 5–7, 1–6, 1–6

=== 31–win indoors streak (2023–present) ===
No.	Tournament	Tier	Start date	Surface	Round	Opponent	Rank	Score
–	ATP Finals	Year-end Finals	13 November 2023	Hard (i)	F	(Serbia) Novak Djokovic (1)	1	3–6, 3–6
1	Davis Cup Finals	Davis Cup	23 November 2023	Hard (i)	QF	(Netherlands) Tallon Griekspoor	23	7–6^{(7–3)}, 6–1
2	Davis Cup Finals	Davis Cup	23 November 2023	Hard (i)	SF	(Serbia) Novak Djokovic	1	6–2, 2–6, 7–5
3	Davis Cup Finals	Davis Cup	23 November 2023	Hard (i)	F	(Australia) Alex de Minaur	12	6–3, 6–0
4	Rotterdam Open	ATP 500	14 February 2024	Hard (i)	1R	(Netherlands) Botic van de Zandschulp	66	6–3, 6–3
5	Rotterdam Open	ATP 500	14 February 2024	Hard (i)	2R	(France) Gaël Monfils (WC)	70	6–3, 3–6, 6–3
6	Rotterdam Open	ATP 500	14 February 2024	Hard (i)	QF	(Canada) Milos Raonic (PR)	309	7–6^{(7–4)}, 1–1 ret.
7	Rotterdam Open	ATP 500	14 February 2024	Hard (i)	SF	(Netherlands) Tallon Griekspoor	29	6–2, 6–4
8	Rotterdam Open	ATP 500	14 February 2024	Hard (i)	F	(Australia) Alex de Minaur (5)	11	7–5, 6–4
9	ATP Finals	Year-end Finals	11 November 2024	Hard (i)	RR	(Australia) Alex de Minaur (7)	9	6–3, 6–4
10	ATP Finals	Year-end Finals	11 November 2024	Hard (i)	RR	(United States) Taylor Fritz (5)	5	6–4, 6–4
11	ATP Finals	Year-end Finals	11 November 2024	Hard (i)	RR	Daniil Medvedev (4)	4	6–3, 6–4
12	ATP Finals	Year-end Finals	11 November 2024	Hard (i)	SF	(Norway) Casper Ruud (6)	7	6–1, 6–2
13	ATP Finals	Year-end Finals	11 November 2024	Hard (i)	F	(United States) Taylor Fritz (5)	5	6–4, 6–4
14	Davis Cup Finals	Davis Cup	18 November 2024	Hard (i)	QF	(Argentina) Sebastián Báez	27	6–2, 6–1
15	Davis Cup Finals	Davis Cup	18 November 2024	Hard (i)	SF	(Australia) Alex de Minaur	9	6–3, 6–4
16	Davis Cup Finals	Davis Cup	18 November 2024	Hard (i)	F	(Netherlands) Tallon Griekspoor	40	7–6^{(7–2)}, 6–2
17	Vienna Open	ATP 500	20 October 2025	Hard (i)	1R	(Germany) Daniel Altmaier	51	6–0, 6–2
18	Vienna Open	ATP 500	20 October 2025	Hard (i)	2R	(Italy) Flavio Cobolli	22	6–2, 7–6^{(7–4)}
19	Vienna Open	ATP 500	20 October 2025	Hard (i)	QF	(Kazakhstan) Alexander Bublik (8)	16	6–4, 6–4
20	Vienna Open	ATP 500	20 October 2025	Hard (i)	SF	(Australia) Alex de Minaur (3)	7	6–3, 6–4
21	Vienna Open	ATP 500	20 October 2025	Hard (i)	F	(Germany) Alexander Zverev (2)	3	3–6, 6–3, 7–5
–	Paris Masters	ATP 1000	27 October 2025	Hard (i)	1R	Bye		
22	Paris Masters	ATP 1000	27 October 2025	Hard (i)	2R	(Belgium) Zizou Bergs	41	6–4, 6–2
23	Paris Masters	ATP 1000	27 October 2025	Hard (i)	3R	(Argentina) Francisco Cerúndolo (17)	21	7–5, 6–1
24	Paris Masters	ATP 1000	27 October 2025	Hard (i)	QF	(United States) Ben Shelton (5)	7	6–3, 6–3
25	Paris Masters	ATP 1000	27 October 2025	Hard (i)	SF	(Germany) Alexander Zverev (3)	3	6–0, 6–1
26	Paris Masters	ATP 1000	27 October 2025	Hard (i)	F	(Canada) Félix Auger-Aliassime (9)	10	6–4, 7–6^{(7–4)}
27	ATP Finals	Year-end Finals	10 November 2025	Hard (i)	RR	(Canada) Félix Auger-Aliassime (8)	8	7–5, 6–1
28	ATP Finals	Year-end Finals	10 November 2025	Hard (i)	RR	(Germany) Alexander Zverev (3)	3	6–4, 6–3
29	ATP Finals	Year-end Finals	10 November 2025	Hard (i)	RR	(United States) Ben Shelton (5)	5	6–3, 7–6^{(7–3)}
30	ATP Finals	Year-end Finals	10 November 2025	Hard (i)	SF	(Australia) Alex de Minaur (7)	7	7–5, 6–2
31	ATP Finals	Year-end Finals	10 November 2025	Hard (i)	F	(Spain) Carlos Alcaraz (1)	1	7–6^{(7–4)}, 7–5

=== 34–win ATP 1000 streak (2025–present) ===
No.	Tournament	Tier	Start date	Surface	Round	Opponent	Rank	Score
–	Shanghai Masters	ATP 1000	1 October 2025	Hard	3R	(Netherlands) Tallon Griekspoor (27)	31	7–6^{(7–3)}, 5–7, 2–3 ret.
–	Paris Masters	ATP 1000	27 October 2025	Hard (i)	1R	Bye		
1	Paris Masters	ATP 1000	27 October 2025	Hard (i)	2R	(Belgium) Zizou Bergs	41	6–4, 6–2
2	Paris Masters	ATP 1000	27 October 2025	Hard (i)	3R	(Argentina) Francisco Cerúndolo (17)	21	7–5, 6–1
3	Paris Masters	ATP 1000	27 October 2025	Hard (i)	QF	(United States) Ben Shelton (5)	7	6–3, 6–3
4	Paris Masters	ATP 1000	27 October 2025	Hard (i)	SF	(Germany) Alexander Zverev (3)	3	6–0, 6–1
5	Paris Masters	ATP 1000	27 October 2025	Hard (i)	F	(Canada) Félix Auger-Aliassime (9)	10	6–4, 7–6^{(7–4)}
–	Indian Wells Open	ATP 1000	4 March 2026	Hard	1R	Bye		
6	Indian Wells Open	ATP 1000	4 March 2026	Hard	2R	(Czech Republic) Dalibor Svrčina (Q)	109	6–1, 6–1
7	Indian Wells Open	ATP 1000	4 March 2026	Hard	3R	(Canada) Denis Shapovalov	39	6–3, 6–2
8	Indian Wells Open	ATP 1000	4 March 2026	Hard	4R	(Brazil) João Fonseca	35	7–6^{(8–6)}, 7–6^{(7–4)}
9	Indian Wells Open	ATP 1000	4 March 2026	Hard	QF	(United States) Learner Tien (25)	27	6–1, 6–2
10	Indian Wells Open	ATP 1000	4 March 2026	Hard	SF	(Germany) Alexander Zverev (4)	4	6–2, 6–4
11	Indian Wells Open	ATP 1000	4 March 2026	Hard	F	Daniil Medvedev (11)	11	7–6^{(8–6)}, 7–6^{(7–4)}
–	Miami Open	ATP 1000	17 March 2026	Hard	1R	Bye		
12	Miami Open	ATP 1000	17 March 2026	Hard	2R	(Bosnia and Herzegovina) Damir Džumhur	76	6–3, 6–3
13	Miami Open	ATP 1000	17 March 2026	Hard	3R	(France) Corentin Moutet (30)	33	6–1, 6–4
14	Miami Open	ATP 1000	17 March 2026	Hard	4R	(United States) Alex Michelsen	40	7–5, 7–6^{(7–4)}
15	Miami Open	ATP 1000	17 March 2026	Hard	QF	(United States) Frances Tiafoe (19)	20	6–2, 6–2
16	Miami Open	ATP 1000	17 March 2026	Hard	SF	(Germany) Alexander Zverev (3)	4	6–3, 7–6^{(7–4)}
17	Miami Open	ATP 1000	17 March 2026	Hard	F	(Czech Republic) Jiří Lehečka (21)	22	6–4, 6–4
–	Monte-Carlo Masters	ATP 1000	5 April 2026	Clay	1R	Bye		
18	Monte-Carlo Masters	ATP 1000	5 April 2026	Clay	2R	(France) Ugo Humbert	34	6–3, 6–0
19	Monte-Carlo Masters	ATP 1000	5 April 2026	Clay	3R	(Czech Republic) Tomáš Macháč	53	6–1, 6–7^{(3–7)}, 6–3
20	Monte-Carlo Masters	ATP 1000	5 April 2026	Clay	QF	(Canada) Félix Auger-Aliassime (6)	7	6–3, 6–4
21	Monte-Carlo Masters	ATP 1000	5 April 2026	Clay	SF	(Germany) Alexander Zverev (3)	3	6–1, 6–4
22	Monte-Carlo Masters	ATP 1000	5 April 2026	Clay	F	(Spain) Carlos Alcaraz (1)	1	7–6^{(7–5)}, 6–3
–	Madrid Open	ATP 1000	21 April 2026	Clay	1R	Bye		
23	Madrid Open	ATP 1000	21 April 2026	Clay	2R	(France) Benjamin Bonzi (Q)	104	6–7^{(6–8)}, 6–1, 6–4
24	Madrid Open	ATP 1000	21 April 2026	Clay	3R	(Denmark) Elmer Møller (Q)	169	6–2, 6–3
25	Madrid Open	ATP 1000	21 April 2026	Clay	4R	(United Kingdom) Cameron Norrie (19)	23	6–2, 7–5
26	Madrid Open	ATP 1000	21 April 2026	Clay	QF	(Spain) Rafael Jódar (WC)	42	6–2, 7–6^{(7–0)}
27	Madrid Open	ATP 1000	21 April 2026	Clay	SF	(France) Arthur Fils (21)	25	6–2, 6–4
28	Madrid Open	ATP 1000	21 April 2026	Clay	F	(Germany) Alexander Zverev (2)	3	6–1, 6–2
–	Italian Open	ATP 1000	4 May 2026	Clay	1R	Bye		
29	Italian Open	ATP 1000	4 May 2026	Clay	2R	(Austria) Sebastian Ofner	82	6–3, 6–4
30	Italian Open	ATP 1000	4 May 2026	Clay	3R	(Australia) Alexei Popyrin	60	6–2, 6–0
31	Italian Open	ATP 1000	4 May 2026	Clay	4R	(Italy) Andrea Pellegrino (Q)	155	6–2, 6–3
32	Italian Open	ATP 1000	4 May 2026	Clay	QF	Andrey Rublev (12)	14	6–2, 6–4
33	Italian Open	ATP 1000	4 May 2026	Clay	SF	Daniil Medvedev (7)	9	6–2, 5–7, 6–4
34	Italian Open	ATP 1000	4 May 2026	Clay	F	(Norway) Casper Ruud (23)	25	6–4, 6–4

== See also ==
- List of Grand Slam men's singles champions
- List of ATP Big Titles singles champions
- ATP Masters 1000 singles records and statistics
- List of ATP number 1 ranked singles tennis players
- Top ten ranked male tennis players
- List of male singles tennis players
- List of highest ranked tennis players per country
- List of tennis title leaders in the Open Era
- ATP Finals appearances
- Chronological list of men's Grand Slam tennis champions
- List of Open Era Grand Slam champions by country
- Italy Davis Cup team
- List of Italy Davis Cup team representatives
- Alcaraz–Sinner rivalry
- Tennis in Italy
