= The Six (tennis) =

Annual exhibition tennis tournament in South Korea

Exhibition
- Founded: 2026; 0 years ago
- Editions: 2026(planned)
- Location: Incheon; South Korea
- Venue: Inspire Arena
- Surface: Hard (indoor)
- Prize money: US$1,100,000

The The Six (officially called Naver X Hyundai Card The Six) is a planned tennis exhibition tournament held in Incheon, South Korea, at the end of the year. The tournament will be held over three days. It is a women's tournament based on men's Six Kings Slam.

== History ==
Since this is not an WTA-sanctioned event, players do not earn any ranking points and the match results do not count towards official head-to-head tallies.

== Results ==
Year	Champion	Runner-up	Score
2026			

== 2026 Edition ==
The first edition of the tournament will be held on 24, 25 and 26 December.

=== Format ===
The six participants were announced in September. The following players were announced as participants:

- Elena Rybakina
- Aryna Sabalenka
- Iga Świątek
- Mirra Andreeva
- Naomi Osaka
- Jasmine Paolini

The draw was announced a month later. World No.1 Elena Rybakina and no.2 Aryna Sabalenka received bye into the second round, whereas Jasmine Paolini will play Iga Świątek and Naomi Osaka will play against Mirra Andreeva.

Quarterfinals
Mirra Andreeva
(Japan) Naomi Osaka
(Poland) Iga Świątek
(Italy) Jasmine Paolini	'

Semifinals
(Kazakhstan) Elena Rybakina
Aryna Sabalenka

Finals
3rd place match

== Broadcasting ==
The event will be broadcast live on KBS and Naver's streaming platform Chzzk.
