= 2025 Six Kings Slam =

2025 tennis tournament in Saudi Arabia

- Date: 15–18 October, 2025
- Edition: 2nd
- Category: Exhibition
- Draw: 6S
- Prize money: US$13,500,000
- Surface: Hard / indoor
- Location: Riyadh, Saudi Arabia
- Venue: anb arena

Champions
- (Italy) Jannik Sinner
- Six Kings Slam

The 2025 Six Kings Slam is the second edition of the tennis exhibition tournament hosted in Riyadh, Saudi Arabia, during the Riyadh Season. The exhibition took place on 15, 16, and 18 October 2025. 17 October is a rest day in order to follow an ATP rule that players cannot compete on three consecutive days in an exhibition.

== History ==
Each of the six participants is guaranteed a participation fee of US$1,500,000, with the winner taking home an additional $4.5 million, for $6 million total. In addition, the winner receives as a trophy a life-size replica of a tennis racket made of 24 Karat solid gold, which weighs 4 Kilograms (the value of the gold is $536,240 as of 28.9.2026) and is identical to the one with which the soon-to-retire Nadal had been honored the previous year.

== Format ==
The six participants were initially announced in August 2025; however, Jack Draper suffered a season-ending arm injury, and he was replaced by Tsitsipas. The bracket was announced the following month, with Alcaraz and Djokovic receiving first round byes. The final saw a rematch of the 2024 Six Kings Slam with a face-off between defending champion and world no. 2 Jannik Sinner and world no. 1 Carlos Alcaraz, where Sinner defeated Alcaraz in straight sets (6–2, 6–4). Taylor Fritz achieved his first win against Novak Djokovic in the third-place playoff, when the latter retired after losing a closely contested first set (75″, 6–7^{(4–7)}).

== Results ==
Quarterfinals
(United States) Taylor Fritz | 6 | 6
(Germany) Alexander Zverev | 3 | 4
(Greece) Stefanos Tsitsipas | 2 | 3
(Italy) Jannik Sinner | 6 | 6

Semifinals
(Spain) Carlos Alcaraz | 6 | 6
(United States) Taylor Fritz | 4 | 2
(Italy) Jannik Sinner | 6 | 6
(Serbia) Novak Djokovic | 4 | 2

Finals
(Spain) Carlos Alcaraz | 2 | 4
(Italy) Jannik Sinner | 6 | 6
3rd place match
(United States) Taylor Fritz | 7^{7} | 0
(Serbia) Novak Djokovic | 6^{4} | 0^{r}
