= 2025 Halle Open – Singles =

Singles
- 2025 Halle Open

Final
- Champion: (Kazakhstan) Alexander Bublik
- Runner-up: Daniil Medvedev
- Score: 6–3, 7–6^{(7–4)}

Details
- Draw: 32 (4Q / 3WC)
- Seeds: 8

Events
Singles	Doubles
- Halle Open

Alexander Bublik defeated Daniil Medvedev in the final, 6–3, 7–6^{(7–4)} to win the singles tennis title at the 2025 Halle Open. It was his second Halle title (after 2023) and fifth ATP Tour singles title overall.

Jannik Sinner was the defending champion, but lost in the second round to Bublik. The defeat ended Sinner's streak of 66 consecutive wins against players ranked outside of the world's top 20 (dating back to the 2023 Cincinnati Open), as well as his streak of 19 consecutive tournament quarterfinals.

== Seeds ==
1. (Italy) Jannik Sinner (second round)
2. (Germany) Alexander Zverev (semifinals)
3. Daniil Medvedev (final)
4. Andrey Rublev (second round)
5. (Argentina) Francisco Cerúndolo (first round)
6. (France) Ugo Humbert (first round)
7. (Czech Republic) Tomáš Macháč (quarterfinals)
8. Karen Khachanov (semifinals)

== Draw ==
Key

- Q = Qualifier
- WC = Wild card
- LL = Lucky loser
- Alt = Alternate
- ITF = ITF entry
- PR = Protected ranking
- SR = Special ranking
- SE = Special exempt
- JE = Junior exempt
- JR = Junior Accelerator Programme entrant
- CO = College Accelerator Programme entrant
- NG = Next Gen Accelerator Program entrant
- w/o = Walkover
- r = Retired
- d = Defaulted

=== Finals ===
Semifinals
(Kazakhstan) Alexander Bublik	4	7^{7}	6
8	Karen Khachanov	6	6^{5}	4
3	Daniil Medvedev	7^{7}	6^{1}	6
2	(Germany) Alexander Zverev	6^{3}	7^{7}	4

Final
(Kazakhstan) Alexander Bublik	6	7^{7}
3	Daniil Medvedev	3	6^{4}

=== Top half ===
First round
1	(Italy) J Sinner	7	6
Q	(Germany) Y Hanfmann	5	3
(France) A Müller	4	4
(Kazakhstan) A Bublik	6	6
(Hungary) F Marozsán	6^{3}	6	6
(Serbia) M Kecmanović	7^{7}	4	4
LL	(Netherlands) J de Jong	5	6	3
7	(Czech Republic) T Macháč	7	3	6
4	A Rublev	6	6
Q	(Austria) S Ofner	3	4
(Spain) P Martínez	1	3
(Argentina) TM Etcheverry	6	6
(Canada) F Auger-Aliassime	6	6^{6}	6
Q	(Serbia) L Djere	3	7^{8}	1
(Belgium) Z Bergs	5	3
8	K Khachanov	7	6

Second round
1	(Italy) J Sinner	6	3	4
(Kazakhstan) A Bublik	3	6	6
(Hungary) F Marozsán	2	3
7	(Czech Republic) T Macháč	6	6
4	A Rublev	3	7^{7}	6^{6}
(Argentina) TM Etcheverry	6	6^{4}	7^{8}
(Canada) F Auger-Aliassime	3	6	3
8	K Khachanov	6	1	6

Quarterfinals
(Kazakhstan) A Bublik	7^{7}	6
7	(Czech Republic) T Macháč	6^{2}	3
(Argentina) TM Etcheverry	3	2
8	K Khachanov	6	6

Semifinals
(Kazakhstan) A Bublik	4	7^{7}	6
8	K Khachanov	6	6^{5}	4

=== Bottom half ===
First round
5	(Argentina) F Cerúndolo	6	5	4
(United States) A Michelsen	2	7	6
(Greece) S Tsitsipas	6	3	7^{7}
(Italy) L Darderi	4	6	6^{5}
(France) Q Halys	6	6
Q	(France) B Bonzi	4	4
WC	(Germany) D Altmaier	3	3
3	D Medvedev	6	6
6	(France) U Humbert	4	6	6^{4}
(Canada) D Shapovalov	6	4	7^{7}
WC	(Brazil) J Fonseca	7	6^{3}	6^{8}
(Italy) F Cobolli	5	7^{7}	7^{10}
(Italy) L Sonego	6	6
WC	(Germany) J-L Struff	3	2
(United States) M Giron	2	1
2	(Germany) A Zverev	6	6

Second round
(United States) A Michelsen	7^{7}	7
(Greece) S Tsitsipas	6^{5}	5
(France) Q Halys	2	5
3	D Medvedev	6	7
(Canada) D Shapovalov	6^{2}	6	6^{5}
(Italy) F Cobolli	7^{7}	4	7^{7}
(Italy) L Sonego	6	4	6^{2}
2	(Germany) A Zverev	3	6	7^{7}

Quarterfinals
(United States) A Michelsen	4	3
3	D Medvedev	6	6
(Italy) F Cobolli	4	6^{6}
2	(Germany) A Zverev	6	7^{8}

Semifinals
3	D Medvedev	7^{7}	6^{1}	6
2	(Germany) A Zverev	6^{3}	7^{7}	4

== Qualifying ==
=== Seeds ===
1. (France) Benjamin Bonzi (qualified)
2. (Serbia) Laslo Djere (qualified)
3. (United States) Learner Tien (first round)
4. Roman Safiullin (first round)
5. (Japan) Yoshihito Nishioka (first round)
6. (Netherlands) Jesper de Jong (qualifying competition, lucky loser)
7. (United States) Ethan Quinn (first round)
8. (United States) Nishesh Basavareddy (withdrew)

=== Qualifiers ===
1. (France) Benjamin Bonzi
2. (Serbia) Laslo Djere
3. (Germany) Yannick Hanfmann
4. (Austria) Sebastian Ofner

=== Lucky loser ===
1. (Netherlands) Jesper de Jong

=== Draw ===
==== First qualifier ====
First round
1	(France) Benjamin Bonzi	6	6
WC	(Germany) Patrick Zahraj	3	4
Alt	(Australia) Li Tu	5	6	7
7	(United States) Ethan Quinn	7	3	5

Qualifying competition
1	(France) Benjamin Bonzi	6	7^{9}
Alt	(Australia) Li Tu	4	6^{7}

==== Second qualifier ====
First round
2	(Serbia) Laslo Djere	7	6
(Georgia (country)) Nikoloz Basilashvili	5	3
WC	(Germany) Max Schönhaus	5	6	2
6	(Netherlands) Jesper de Jong	7	3	6

Qualifying competition
2	(Serbia) Laslo Djere	6	6
6	(Netherlands) Jesper de Jong	4	0

==== Third qualifier ====
First round
3	(United States) Learner Tien	3	4
(Chile) Nicolás Jarry	6	6
(Germany) Yannick Hanfmann	6	6
5	(Japan) Yoshihito Nishioka	4	1

Qualifying competition
(Chile) Nicolás Jarry	3	3
(Germany) Yannick Hanfmann	6	6

==== Fourth qualifier ====
First round
4	Roman Safiullin	7^{7}	6^{6}	5
WC	(Germany) Justin Engel	6^{4}	7^{8}	7
(Austria) Sebastian Ofner	7^{7}	7
Alt	(Lebanon) Benjamin Hassan	6^{4}	5

Qualifying competition
WC	(Germany) Justin Engel	4	4
(Austria) Sebastian Ofner	6	6
