= 2025 Halle Open – Doubles =

Doubles
- 2025 Halle Open

Final
- Champions: (Germany) Kevin Krawietz (Germany) Tim Pütz
- Runners-up: (Italy) Simone Bolelli (Italy) Andrea Vavassori
- Score: 6−3, 7−6^{(7−4)}

Details
- Draw: 16
- Seeds: 4

Events
Singles	Doubles
← 2024 ·	Halle Open	· 2026 →

Kevin Krawietz and Tim Pütz defeated defending champions Simone Bolelli and Andrea Vavassori in the final, 6−3, 7−6^{(7−4)} to win the doubles tennis title at the 2025 Halle Open.

== Seeds ==
1. (Germany) Kevin Krawietz / (Germany) Tim Pütz (champions)
2. (Italy) Simone Bolelli / (Italy) Andrea Vavassori (final)
3. (United States) Christian Harrison / (United States) Evan King (quarterfinals)
4. (France) Sadio Doumbia / (France) Fabien Reboul (quarterfinals)

== Draw ==
Key

- Q = Qualifier
- WC = Wild card
- LL = Lucky loser
- Alt = Alternate
- ITF = ITF entry
- PR = Protected ranking
- SR = Special ranking
- SE = Special exempt
- JE = Junior exempt
- JR = Junior Accelerator Programme entrant
- CO = College Accelerator Programme entrant
- NG = Next Gen Accelerator Program entrant
- w/o = Walkover
- r = Retired
- d = Defaulted

=== Draw ===
First round
1	(Germany) K Krawietz (Germany) T Pütz	6	6
(Sweden) A Göransson (Netherlands) S Verbeek	3	4
(Italy) J Sinner (Italy) L Sonego	6	5	[3]
K Khachanov (United States) A Michelsen	2	7	[10]
4	(France) S Doumbia (France) F Reboul	6^{3}	7^{7}	[11]
D Medvedev; A Rublev	7^{7}	6^{5}	[9]
Q	(Portugal) F Cabral (Austria) L Miedler	6	6
WC	(Brazil) J Fonseca (Greece) Pe Tsitsipas	4	4
WC	(Germany) M Schönhaus (Germany) J-L Struff	7^{7}	6^{4}	[8]
(Canada) F Auger-Aliassime (Canada) D Shapovalov	6^{4}	7^{7}	[10]
(Argentina) M González (Argentina) A Molteni	6^{7}	6^{4}
3	(United States) C Harrison (United States) E King	7^{9}	7^{7}
(United States) N Lammons (United States) J Withrow	6	6^{2}	[10]
(Czech Republic) T Macháč (Poland) J Zieliński	4	7^{7}	[6]
(Brazil) M Melo (Germany) A Zverev	6^{4}	5
2	(Italy) S Bolelli (Italy) A Vavassori	7^{7}	7

Quarterfinals
1	(Germany) K Krawietz (Germany) T Pütz	6	4	[10]
K Khachanov (United States) A Michelsen	3	6	[8]
4	(France) S Doumbia (France) F Reboul	6^{3}	2
Q	(Portugal) F Cabral (Austria) L Miedler	7^{7}	6
(Canada) F Auger-Aliassime (Canada) D Shapovalov	7	4	[10]
3	(United States) C Harrison (United States) E King	5	6	[8]
(United States) N Lammons (United States) J Withrow	6^{10}	2
2	(Italy) S Bolelli (Italy) A Vavassori	7^{12}	6

Semifinals
1	(Germany) K Krawietz (Germany) T Pütz	7^{8}	6
Q	(Portugal) F Cabral (Austria) L Miedler	6^{6}	4
(Canada) F Auger-Aliassime (Canada) D Shapovalov	2	2
2	(Italy) S Bolelli (Italy) A Vavassori	6	6

Final
1	(Germany) K Krawietz (Germany) T Pütz	6	7^{7}
2	(Italy) S Bolelli (Italy) A Vavassori	3	6^{4}

== Qualifying ==
=== Seeds ===
1. (Portugal) Francisco Cabral / (Austria) Lucas Miedler (qualified)
2. (Italy) Flavio Cobolli / (Italy) Luciano Darderi (first round)

=== Qualifiers ===
1. (Portugal) Francisco Cabral / (Austria) Lucas Miedler

=== Qualifying draw ===
First round
1	(Portugal) Francisco Cabral (Austria) Lucas Miedler	6	7^{12}
(United States) Marcos Giron (Spain) Pedro Martínez	4	6^{10}
WC	(Germany) Andreas Mies (Germany) Patrick Zahraj	7^{7}	3	[10]
2	(Italy) Flavio Cobolli (Italy) Luciano Darderi	6^{3}	6	[7]

Qualifying competition
1	(Portugal) Francisco Cabral (Austria) Lucas Miedler	5	6	[19]
WC	(Germany) Andreas Mies (Germany) Patrick Zahraj	7	3	[17]
