= 2025 Halle Open =

- Date: 16–22 June
- Edition: 32nd
- Category: ATP Tour 500
- Draw: 32S / 16D
- Surface: Grass
- Location: Halle, Germany
- Venue: OWL Arena

Champions

Singles
- (Kazakhstan) Alexander Bublik

Doubles
- (Germany) Kevin Krawietz / (Germany) Tim Pütz
← 2024 ·	Halle Open	· 2026 →

The 2025 Halle Open (known for sponsorship reasons as the Terra Wortmann Open) was a men's tennis tournament played on outdoor grass courts. It was the 32nd edition of the Halle Open and part of the ATP Tour 500 series of the 2025 ATP Tour. It took place at the OWL Arena in Halle, North Rhine-Westphalia, Germany, between 16 June and 22 June 2025.

== Finals ==
=== Singles ===
- (Kazakhstan) Alexander Bublik def. Daniil Medvedev, 6–3, 7–6^{(7–4)}

=== Doubles ===
- (Germany) Kevin Krawietz / (Germany) Tim Pütz def. (Italy) Simone Bolelli / (Italy) Andrea Vavassori, 6−3, 7−6^{(7−4)}

== Singles main draw entrants ==
=== Seeds ===
Country	Player	Rank^{1}	Seed
ITA	Jannik Sinner	1	1
GER	Alexander Zverev	3	2
	Daniil Medvedev	11	3
	Andrey Rublev	15	4
ARG	Francisco Cerúndolo	17	5
FRA	Ugo Humbert	20	6
CZE	Tomáš Macháč	22	7
	Karen Khachanov	24	8

- ^{1} Rankings are as of 9 June 2025.

=== Other entrants ===
The following players received wildcards into the main draw:

- (Germany) Daniel Altmaier
- (Brazil) João Fonseca
- (Germany) Jan-Lennard Struff

The following players received entry from the qualifying draw:

- (France) Benjamin Bonzi
- (Serbia) Laslo Djere
- (Germany) Yannick Hanfmann
- (Austria) Sebastian Ofner

The following player received entry as a lucky loser:

- (Netherlands) Jesper de Jong

=== Withdrawals ===
- (France) Arthur Fils → replaced by (Belgium) Zizou Bergs
- (Netherlands) Tallon Griekspoor → replaced by (France) Quentin Halys
- (Poland) Hubert Hurkacz → replaced by (Netherlands) Jesper de Jong
- (Chile) Alejandro Tabilo → replaced by (Kazakhstan) Alexander Bublik

== Doubles main draw entrants ==
=== Seeds ===
Country	Player	Country	Player	Rank^{1}	Seed
GER	Kevin Krawietz	GER	Tim Pütz	11	1
ITA	Simone Bolelli	ITA	Andrea Vavassori	25	2
USA	Christian Harrison	USA	Evan King	39	3
FRA	Sadio Doumbia	FRA	Fabien Reboul	50	4

- ^{1} Rankings are as of 9 June 2025.

=== Other entrants ===
The following pairs received wildcards into the doubles main draw:

- (Brazil) João Fonseca / (Greece) Petros Tsitsipas
- (Germany) Max Schönhaus / (Germany) Jan-Lennard Struff

The following pair received entry from the qualifying draw:

- (Portugal) Francisco Cabral / (Austria) Lucas Miedler

=== Withdrawals ===
- (Poland) Hubert Hurkacz / Karen Khachanov → replaced by Karen Khachanov / (United States) Alex Michelsen
