= 2024 Six Kings Slam =

2024 tennis tournament in Saudi Arabia

- Date: 16–19 October 2024
- Edition: 1st
- Category: Exhibition
- Draw: 6S
- Prize money: US$13,500,000
- Surface: Hard / indoor
- Location: Riyadh, Saudi Arabia
- Venue: The Venue

Champions
- (Italy) Jannik Sinner
- Six Kings Slam

The 2024 Six Kings Slam was the inaugural edition of the tennis exhibition tournament held in Riyadh, Saudi Arabia, during the Riyadh Season. The exhibition took place on 16, 17 and 19 October 2024. 18 October was a rest day in order to follow an ATP rule that players cannot compete on three consecutive days in an exhibition.

== History ==
Each of the six participants was guaranteed a participation fee of US$1,500,000, with the winner taking home the largest prize in tennis history, US$6,000,000—almost double the prize money for a Grand Slam champion (US$3.8M) at the time.

Jannik Sinner won the inaugural tournament by defeating Carlos Alcaraz in the final and claimed the biggest prize check in tennis history, surpassing Novak Djokovic's prize of $4,740,300 at the 2022 ATP Finals. Novak Djokovic defeated Rafael Nadal for the third-place trophy. Rafael Nadal, who announced his retirement at the end of the season, was gifted with a life-size replica of a solid gold racket in honor of his career.

== Results ==
The official format was a single-elimination tournament, with two players getting byes directly to the semifinals: Novak Djokovic and Rafael Nadal.

=== Draw ===
Quarterfinals
(Italy) Jannik Sinner	6	6
(Russia) Daniil Medvedev	0	3
(Denmark) Holger Rune	4	2
(Spain) Carlos Alcaraz	6	6

Semifinals
(Serbia) Novak Djokovic	2	7^{7}	4
(Italy) Jannik Sinner	6	6^{0}	6
(Spain) Carlos Alcaraz	6	6
(Spain) Rafael Nadal	3	3

Finals
(Italy) Jannik Sinner	6^{5}	6	6
(Spain) Carlos Alcaraz	7^{7}	3	3
3rd place match
(Serbia) Novak Djokovic	6	7^{7}
(Spain) Rafael Nadal	2	6^{5}

== Promotion ==
A five-minute commercial starring the competitors titled Six Kings Slam: Call of the Kings was released on 29 September 2024.
