= Six Kings Slam =

Annual exhibition tennis tournament in Saudi Arabia

Exhibition
- Founded: 2024; 2 years ago
- Editions: 2 (2025)
- Location: Riyadh; Saudi Arabia
- Venue: ANB Arena
- Surface: Hard (indoor)
- Prize money: US$13,500,000
- Website: Six Kings Slam

Current champions (2025)
- Singles: (Italy) Jannik Sinner

The Six Kings Slam is a tennis exhibition tournament held in Riyadh, Saudi Arabia, during the Riyadh Season. The tournament is held over four days, with the third day being a rest day in order to follow an ATP rule that players cannot compete on three consecutive days in an exhibition.

== History ==
Since this is not an ATP-sanctioned event, players do not earn any ranking points and the match results do not count towards official head-to-head tallies. Each of the six participants is guaranteed a participation fee with the winner receiving a larger payout.

The event is held in an 8,000 seat stadium purpose-built for the tournament originally named the Venue, later named anb arena [sic].

Jannik Sinner won the inaugural tournament by defeating Carlos Alcaraz in the final and claimed the biggest prize check in tennis history, surpassing Novak Djokovic's prize of $4,740,300 at the 2022 ATP Finals. Novak Djokovic defeated Rafael Nadal for the third-place trophy.

== Results ==
| Year | Champion | Runner-up | Score |
|---|---|---|---|
| 2024 | (Italy) Jannik Sinner | (Spain) Carlos Alcaraz | 6–7^{(5–7)}, 6–3, 6–3 |
| 2025 | (Italy) Jannik Sinner (2) | (Spain) Carlos Alcaraz | 6–2, 6–4 |
| 2026 | | | |

== Broadcasting ==
For its first year, DAZN acquired the global rights to broadcast 6 Kings Slam, with T2 airing the matches in the US. For its second and third year, Netflix acquired the rights.
