= 2025 French Open – Men's singles =

Tennis championship

Men's singles
- 2025 French Open

Final
- Champion: (Spain) Carlos Alcaraz
- Runner-up: (Italy) Jannik Sinner
- Score: 4–6, 6–7^{(4–7)}, 6–4, 7–6^{(7–3)}, 7–6^{(10–2)}
- Date: 8 June 2025

Details
- Draw: 128 (16Q / 8WC)
- Seeds: 32

Events
Singles	men	women		boys	girls
Doubles	men	women	mixed	boys	girls
WC Singles	men	women	quad	boys	girls
WC Doubles	men	women	quad	boys	girls

Qualification
Singles	men	women
- French Open

Defending champion Carlos Alcaraz defeated Jannik Sinner in the final, 4–6, 6–7^{(4–7)}, 6–4, 7–6^{(7–3)}, 7–6^{(10–2)} to win the men's singles tennis title at the 2025 French Open. It was his second French Open title and fifth major title overall. Alcaraz came from two sets down and saved three consecutive championship points en route to the title, becoming the third man in the Open Era to win a major after being championship points down, following Gastón Gaudio at the 2004 French Open and Novak Djokovic at the 2019 Wimbledon Championships. Both players served for the championship (Sinner at 5–4 in the fourth set, Alcaraz at 5–4 in the fifth set), but both were broken. With the win, Alcaraz ended Sinner's undefeated record in major finals.

At 5 hours and 29 minutes, it was the longest French Open final in history (surpassing the 1982 final), and the second-longest major final overall, behind only the 2012 Australian Open final. Alcaraz was the second man in the Open Era (after Roger Federer) to win his first five major finals and the second-youngest to win a fifth major, behind only Björn Borg (at 22 years and 5 days) and tied with Rafael Nadal (at the exact same age of 22 years, 1 month and 3 days). It was the first French Open singles final to be decided in a final-set tiebreak (after the tiebreak rule was added in 2022), and the first men's final at any major to be contested by two players born in the 2000s.

With his fourth-round win, Djokovic became the second player (after Nadal) to achieve 100 career match wins at the French Open, as well as the third man to win 100 matches at a major, alongside Nadal at the French Open and Federer at both the Australian Open and Wimbledon Championships. Additionally, Djokovic broke Federer's record for the most quarterfinals at one major, with 19, and was the second-oldest man in the Open Era to reach the French Open semifinals (after Pancho Gonzales in 1968).

This marked the first time in the Open Era that two Italian men (Lorenzo Musetti and Sinner) reached the semifinals of a singles major, and the first time at the French Open since Nicola Pietrangeli and Orlando Sirola in 1960. Additionally, Sinner was the first Italian man to reach the French Open final since Adriano Panatta won the title in 1976. Alexander Bublik became the first Kazakhstani man to reach a major singles quarterfinal. Tommy Paul and Frances Tiafoe were the first American men to reach the French Open quarterfinals since Andre Agassi in 2003, marking the first time that multiple American men did so since Pete Sampras and Jim Courier in 1996. With his win over Hugo Dellien in the first round, Gaël Monfils claimed his 40th career main draw match win, equaling Yannick Noah for the most singles main-draw wins at the tournament by a French player.

This tournament marked the final professional appearance of former world No. 7 and three-time major semifinalist Richard Gasquet, who lost in the second round to Sinner. His 22nd participation at the event was the most in the Open Era, and equaled the all-time record of Antoine Gentien.

== Seeds ==
1. (Italy) Jannik Sinner (final)
2. (Spain) Carlos Alcaraz (champion)
3. (Germany) Alexander Zverev (quarterfinals)
4. (United States) Taylor Fritz (first round)
5. (United Kingdom) Jack Draper (fourth round)
6. (Serbia) Novak Djokovic (semifinals)
7. (Norway) Casper Ruud (second round)
8. (Italy) Lorenzo Musetti (semifinals, retired)
9. (Australia) Alex de Minaur (second round)
10. (Denmark) Holger Rune (fourth round)
11. Daniil Medvedev (first round)
12. (United States) Tommy Paul (quarterfinals)
13. (United States) Ben Shelton (fourth round)
14. (France) Arthur Fils (third round, withdrew)
15. (United States) Frances Tiafoe (quarterfinals)
16. (Bulgaria) Grigor Dimitrov (first round, retired)
17. Andrey Rublev (fourth round)
18. (Argentina) Francisco Cerúndolo (first round)
19. (Czech Republic) Jakub Menšík (second round)
20. (Greece) Stefanos Tsitsipas (second round)
21. (Czech Republic) Tomáš Macháč (first round, retired)
22. (France) Ugo Humbert (second round, retired)
23. (United States) Sebastian Korda (third round)
24. Karen Khachanov (third round)
25. (Australia) Alexei Popyrin (fourth round)
26. (Spain) Alejandro Davidovich Fokina (second round)
27. (Canada) Denis Shapovalov (second round)
28. (United States) Brandon Nakashima (first round)
29. (Canada) Félix Auger-Aliassime (first round)
30. (Poland) Hubert Hurkacz (first round)
31. (France) Giovanni Mpetshi Perricard (second round)
32. (United States) Alex Michelsen (first round)

== Draw ==
Key

- Q = Qualifier
- WC = Wild card
- LL = Lucky loser
- Alt = Alternate
- ITF = ITF entry
- PR = Protected ranking
- SR = Special ranking
- SE = Special exempt
- JE = Junior exempt
- JR = Junior Accelerator Programme entrant
- CO = College Accelerator Programme entrant
- NG = Next Gen Accelerator Program entrant
- w/o = Walkover
- r = Retired
- d = Defaulted

=== Finals ===
Quarterfinals
1	(Italy) Jannik Sinner	6	7	6
(Kazakhstan) Alexander Bublik	1	5	0
3	(Germany) Alexander Zverev	6	3	2	4
6	(Serbia) Novak Djokovic	4	6	6	6
8	(Italy) Lorenzo Musetti	6	4	7	6
15	(United States) Frances Tiafoe	2	6	5	2
12	(United States) Tommy Paul	0	1	4
2	(Spain) Carlos Alcaraz	6	6	6

Semifinals
1	(Italy) Jannik Sinner	6	7	7^{7}
6	(Serbia) Novak Djokovic	4	5	6^{3}
8	(Italy) Lorenzo Musetti	6	6^{3}	0	0^{r}
2	(Spain) Carlos Alcaraz	4	7^{7}	6	2

Final
1	(Italy) Jannik Sinner	6	7^{7}	4	6^{3}	6^{2}
2	(Spain) Carlos Alcaraz	4	6^{4}	6	7^{7}	7^{10}

=== Top half ===
==== Section 1 ====
First round
1	(Italy) J Sinner	6	6	7
(France) A Rinderknech	4	3	5
WC	(France) T Atmane	2	6	3	0
WC	(France) R Gasquet	6	2	6	6
(Czech Republic) J Lehečka	6	6	6
(Australia) J Thompson	4	2	1
Q	(Spain) P Llamas Ruiz	3	2	7^{7}	3
26	(Spain) A Davidovich Fokina	6	6	6^{4}	6
17	A Rublev	6	4	6	6
Q	(South Africa) L Harris	4	6	3	1
Q	(Germany) M Marterer	6^{3}	6	3	6	2
(Australia) A Walton	7^{7}	4	6	2	6
(Argentina) C Ugo Carabelli	4	1	5
(Spain) J Munar	6	6	7
(Chile) N Jarry	3	4	7^{8}	3
14	(France) A Fils	6	6	6^{6}	6

Second round
1	(Italy) J Sinner	6	6	6
WC	(France) R Gasquet	3	0	4
(Czech Republic) J Lehečka	6	3	6	6
26	(Spain) A Davidovich Fokina	3	6	1	2
17	A Rublev	7^{7}	6	7^{7}
(Australia) A Walton	6^{1}	1	6^{5}
(Spain) J Munar	6^{3}	6^{4}	6	6	4
14	(France) A Fils	7^{7}	7^{7}	2	0	6

Third round
1	(Italy) J Sinner	6	6	6
(Czech Republic) J Lehečka	0	1	2
17	A Rublev	w/o
14	(France) A Fils

Fourth round
1	(Italy) J Sinner	6	6	6
17	A Rublev	1	3	4

==== Section 2 ====
First round
9	(Australia) A de Minaur	6	6	7^{8}
(Serbia) L Djere	3	4	6^{6}
(Kazakhstan) A Bublik	6	6	6
(Australia) J Duckworth	2	4	4
Q	(Georgia (country)) N Basilashvili	6^{0}	6	6^{9}	6	2
Q	(Portugal) H Rocha	7^{7}	2	7^{11}	2	6
(France) A Müller	5	7^{7}	5	3
19	(Czech Republic) J Menšík	7	6^{5}	7	6
30	(Poland) H Hurkacz	2	4	2
(Brazil) J Fonseca	6	6	6
WC	(France) P-H Herbert	7	3	4	7	6
(France) B Bonzi	5	6	6	5	2
(France) G Monfils	4	3	6	7^{7}	6
(Bolivia) H Dellien	6	6	1	6^{4}	1
(Italy) M Bellucci	6	1	4	2
5	(United Kingdom) J Draper	3	6	6	6

Second round
9	(Australia) A de Minaur	6	6	4	3	2
(Kazakhstan) A Bublik	2	2	6	6	6
Q	(Portugal) H Rocha	2	1	6	6	6
19	(Czech Republic) J Menšík	6	6	4	3	3
(Brazil) J Fonseca	7^{7}	7^{7}	6
WC	(France) P-H Herbert	6^{4}	6^{4}	4
(France) G Monfils	3	6	3	5
5	(United Kingdom) J Draper	6	4	6	7

Third round
(Kazakhstan) A Bublik	7	6	6
Q	(Portugal) H Rocha	5	1	2
(Brazil) J Fonseca	2	4	2
5	(United Kingdom) J Draper	6	6	6

Fourth round
(Kazakhstan) A Bublik	5	6	6	6
5	(United Kingdom) J Draper	7	3	2	4

==== Section 3 ====
First round
3	(Germany) A Zverev	6	6	6
(United States) L Tien	3	3	4
(Netherlands) J de Jong	3	6^{7}	6	7^{7}	6
(Italy) F Passaro	6	7^{9}	4	6^{1}	1
LL	(Croatia) M Čilić	2	1	3
(Italy) F Cobolli	6	6	6
(Italy) M Arnaldi	5	2	6	6	6
29	(Canada) F Auger-Aliassime	7	6	3	4	2
18	(Argentina) F Cerúndolo	5	3	4
(Canada) G Diallo	7	6	6
(United States) M Giron	6	3	4	5
(Netherlands) T Griekspoor	4	6	6	7
LL	(Kazakhstan) A Shevchenko	6	6	7^{7}
(Serbia) D Lajović	2	4	6^{4}
Q	(United States) E Quinn	2	3	6	0
16	(Bulgaria) G Dimitrov	6	6	2	0^{r}

Second round
3	(Germany) A Zverev	3	6	6	6
(Netherlands) J de Jong	6	1	2	3
(Italy) F Cobolli	6	6	6^{6}	6
(Italy) M Arnaldi	3	3	7^{8}	1
(Canada) G Diallo	5	6^{3}	6	3
(Netherlands) T Griekspoor	7	7^{7}	1	6
LL	(Kazakhstan) A Shevchenko	4	6	7^{7}	6^{3}	5
Q	(United States) E Quinn	6	4	6^{5}	7^{7}	7

Third round
3	(Germany) A Zverev	6	7^{7}	6
(Italy) F Cobolli	2	6^{4}	1
(Netherlands) T Griekspoor	4	6	6^{2}	6	6
Q	(United States) E Quinn	6	1	7^{7}	1	4

Fourth round
3	(Germany) A Zverev	6	3
(Netherlands) T Griekspoor	4	0^{r}

==== Section 4 ====
First round
11	D Medvedev	5	3	6	6	5
(United Kingdom) C Norrie	7	6	4	1	7
(United States) A Kovacevic	6	4	4	1
LL	(Argentina) FA Gómez	4	6	6	6
(United Kingdom) J Fearnley	7^{8}	6	6
WC	(Switzerland) S Wawrinka	6^{6}	3	2
(Australia) C O'Connell	5	3	6^{3}
22	(France) U Humbert	7	6	7^{7}
27	(Canada) D Shapovalov	6	6	6
(Spain) P Martínez	2	0	3
Q	(Austria) F Misolic	5	7^{7}	7^{7}	6
(China) Y Bu	7	6^{3}	6^{4}	1
(France) C Moutet	6	7^{8}	6
Q	(France) C Tabur	3	6^{6}	3
(United States) M McDonald	3	3	3
6	(Serbia) N Djokovic	6	6	6

Second round
(United Kingdom) C Norrie	7^{9}	6	6
LL	(Argentina) FA Gómez	6^{7}	2	1
(United Kingdom) J Fearnley	6	4
22	(France) U Humbert	3	4^{r}
27	(Canada) D Shapovalov	6^{5}	6^{6}	6	6	3
Q	(Austria) F Misolic	7^{7}	7^{8}	4	4	6
(France) C Moutet	3	2	6^{1}
6	(Serbia) N Djokovic	6	6	7^{7}

Third round
(United Kingdom) C Norrie	6	7^{7}	6
(United Kingdom) J Fearnley	3	6^{1}	2
Q	(Austria) F Misolic	3	4	2
6	(Serbia) N Djokovic	6	6	6

Fourth round
(United Kingdom) C Norrie	2	3	2
6	(Serbia) N Djokovic	6	6	6

=== Bottom half ===
==== Section 5 ====
First round
8	(Italy) L Musetti	7	6	6
Q	(Germany) Y Hanfmann	5	2	0
WC	(France) V Royer	6^{6}	3	6	7^{7}	5
LL	(Colombia) DE Galán	7^{8}	6	3	6^{4}	7
PR	(United States) R Opelka	1	6	7	7^{7}
(Australia) R Hijikata	6	3	5	6^{3}
(Argentina) M Navone	7^{7}	4	6	6
28	(United States) B Nakashima	6^{2}	6	1	2
21	(Czech Republic) T Macháč	6^{4}	1^{r}
(France) Q Halys	7^{7}	4
(Serbia) M Kecmanović	6^{3}	6^{4}	6	6	6
(Argentina) S Báez	7^{7}	7^{7}	4	2	2
WC	(United States) E Nava	6	7	7
(Netherlands) B van de Zandschulp	2	5	5
(Spain) R Bautista Agut	7^{7}	4	3	2
10	(Denmark) H Rune	6^{4}	6	6	6

Second round
8	(Italy) L Musetti	6	6	6
LL	(Colombia) DE Galán	4	0	4
PR	(United States) R Opelka	1	6^{1}	3
(Argentina) M Navone	6	7^{7}	6
(France) Q Halys	4	6	7^{7}	7
(Serbia) M Kecmanović	6	3	6^{2}	5
WC	(United States) E Nava	3	6^{5}	3
10	(Denmark) H Rune	6	7^{7}	6

Third round
8	(Italy) L Musetti	4	6	6	6
(Argentina) M Navone	6	4	3	2
(France) Q Halys	6	2	7	5	2
10	(Denmark) H Rune	4	6	5	7	6

Fourth round
8	(Italy) L Musetti	7	3	6	6
10	(Denmark) H Rune	5	6	3	2

==== Section 6 ====
First round
15	(United States) F Tiafoe	6	7	6
R Safiullin	4	5	4
(Spain) P Carreño Busta	6	7^{7}	7
(Argentina) F Comesaña	2	6^{3}	5
PR	(United States) J Brooksby	6	3	6	6
(Portugal) J Faria	1	6	3	2
(Italy) L Darderi	2	6	3	2
23	(United States) S Korda	6	4	6	6
32	(United States) A Michelsen	3	2	4
Q	(Argentina) JM Cerúndolo	6	6	6
(Poland) K Majchrzak	3	3	6^{2}
(Serbia) H Medjedovic	6	6	7^{7}
(Czech Republic) V Kopřiva	6	6	4	6^{6}	6
(Brazil) T Monteiro	4	3	6	7^{8}	1
(Germany) D Altmaier	7	3	6	6
4	(United States) T Fritz	5	6	3	1

Second round
15	(United States) F Tiafoe	6	6	6
(Spain) P Carreño Busta	4	3	1
PR	(United States) J Brooksby	1	2	6^{2}
23	(United States) S Korda	6	6	7^{7}
Q	(Argentina) JM Cerúndolo	3	4	5
(Serbia) H Medjedovic	6	6	7
(Czech Republic) V Kopřiva	2	6	3	5
(Germany) D Altmaier	6	4	6	7

Third round
15	(United States) F Tiafoe	7^{8}	6	6
23	(United States) S Korda	6^{6}	3	4
(Serbia) H Medjedovic	6	3	3	2
(Germany) D Altmaier	4	6	6	6

Fourth round
15	(United States) F Tiafoe	6	6	7^{7}
(Germany) D Altmaier	3	4	6^{4}

==== Section 7 ====
First round
7	(Norway) C Ruud	6	6	6
Q	(Spain) A Ramos Viñolas	3	4	2
Q	(France) K Jacquet	6	7^{7}	4	3	3
(Portugal) N Borges	3	6^{3}	6	6	6
(Chile) A Tabilo	5	6	6	1	6
WC	(France) A Cazaux	7	3	2	6	3
(Japan) Y Nishioka	5	4	2^{r}
25	(Australia) A Popyrin	7	6	1
24	K Khachanov	6	6	6
(Australia) A Vukic	4	4	4
PR	(Austria) S Ofner	7^{7}	6	6^{5}	6
(Germany) J-L Struff	6^{5}	3	7^{7}	2
(Hungary) M Fucsovics	6	6	6
WC	(Australia) T Schoolkate	4	2	2
LL	(Denmark) E Møller	7^{7}	2	3	1
12	(United States) T Paul	6^{5}	6	6	6

Second round
7	(Norway) C Ruud	6	4	1	0
(Portugal) N Borges	2	6	6	6
(Chile) A Tabilo	5	3	4
25	(Australia) A Popyrin	7	6	6
24	K Khachanov	7	3	7	4	6
PR	(Austria) S Ofner	5	6	5	6	2
(Hungary) M Fucsovics	6	6	3	5	4
12	(United States) T Paul	4	2	6	7	6

Third round
(Portugal) N Borges	4	6^{11}	6^{5}
25	(Australia) A Popyrin	6	7^{13}	7^{7}
24	K Khachanov	3	6	6^{7}	6	3
12	(United States) T Paul	6	3	7^{9}	3	6

Fourth round
25	(Australia) A Popyrin	3	3	3
12	(United States) T Paul	6	6	6

==== Section 8 ====
First round
13	(United States) B Shelton	6	4	3	6	6
(Italy) L Sonego	4	6	6	2	3
(France) H Gaston	2	6	2	6	6
Q	(France) U Blanchet	6	0	6	3	4
Q	(Lebanon) B Hassan	4	2	0
Q	(Italy) M Gigante	6	6	6
(Argentina) TM Etcheverry	5	3	4
20	(Greece) S Tsitsipas	7	6	6
31	(France) G Mpetshi Perricard	4	6	7^{7}	6
(Belgium) Z Bergs	6	3	6^{5}	4
LL	(Argentina) TA Tirante	6	4	3	5
(Bosnia and Herzegovina) D Džumhur	3	6	6	7
(Hungary) F Marozsán	6	6	7^{7}
(Italy) L Nardi	2	3	6^{3}
Q	(Italy) G Zeppieri	3	4	2
2	(Spain) C Alcaraz	6	6	6

Second round
13	(United States) B Shelton	w/o
(France) H Gaston
Q	(Italy) M Gigante	6	5	6	6
20	(Greece) S Tsitsipas	4	7	2	4
31	(France) G Mpetshi Perricard	6^{4}	3	6	4
(Bosnia and Herzegovina) D Džumhur	7^{7}	6	4	6
(Hungary) F Marozsán	1	6	1	2
2	(Spain) C Alcaraz	6	4	6	6

Third round
13	(United States) B Shelton	6	6	6
Q	(Italy) M Gigante	3	3	4
(Bosnia and Herzegovina) D Džumhur	1	3	6	4
2	(Spain) C Alcaraz	6	6	4	6

Fourth round
13	(United States) B Shelton	6^{8}	3	6	4
2	(Spain) C Alcaraz	7^{10}	6	4	6

== Seeded players ==
The following are the seeded players. Seedings are based on ATP rankings as of 19 May 2025. Rankings and points before are as of 26 May 2025.

Seed	Rank	Player	Points before	Points defending	Points earned	Points after	Status
1	1	(Italy) Jannik Sinner	10,380	800	1,300	10,880	Runner-up, lost to (Spain) Carlos Alcaraz [2]
2	2	(Spain) Carlos Alcaraz	8,850	2,000	2,000	8,850	Champion, defeated (Italy) Jannik Sinner [1]
3	3	(Germany) Alexander Zverev	7,285	1,300	400	6,385	Quarterfinals lost to (Serbia) Novak Djokovic [6]
4	4	(United States) Taylor Fritz	4,675	200	10	4,485	First round lost to (Germany) Daniel Altmaier
5	5	(United Kingdom) Jack Draper	4,610	10	200	4,800	Fourth round lost to (Kazakhstan) Alexander Bublik
6	6	(Serbia) Novak Djokovic	4,230	400	800	4,630	Semifinals lost to (Italy) Jannik Sinner [1]
7	8	(Norway) Casper Ruud	3,655	800	50	2,905	Second round lost to (Portugal) Nuno Borges
8	7	(Italy) Lorenzo Musetti	3,860	100	800	4,560	Semifinals retired against (Spain) Carlos Alcaraz [2]
9	9	(Australia) Alex de Minaur	3,635	400	50	3,285	Second round lost to (Kazakhstan) Alexander Bublik
10	10	(Denmark) Holger Rune	3,440	200	200	3,440	Fourth round lost to (Italy) Lorenzo Musetti [8]
11	11	Daniil Medvedev	3,290	200	10	3,100	First round lost to (United Kingdom) Cameron Norrie
12	12	(United States) Tommy Paul	3,210	100	400	3,510	Quarterfinals lost to (Spain) Carlos Alcaraz [2]
13	13	(United States) Ben Shelton	2,980	100	200	3,080	Fourth round lost to (Spain) Carlos Alcaraz [2]
14	14	(France) Arthur Fils	2,845	10	100	2,935	Third round withdrew due to back injury
15	16	(United States) Frances Tiafoe	2,665	50	400	3,015	Quarterfinals lost to (Italy) Lorenzo Musetti [8]
16	17	(Bulgaria) Grigor Dimitrov	2,595	400	10	2,205	First round retired against (United States) Ethan Quinn [Q]
17	15	Andrey Rublev	2,820	100	200	2,920	Fourth round lost to (Italy) Jannik Sinner [1]
18	18	(Argentina) Francisco Cerúndolo	2,475	200	10	2,285	First round lost to (Canada) Gabriel Diallo
19	19	(Czech Republic) Jakub Menšík	2,272	0	50	2,322	Second round lost to (Portugal) Henrique Rocha [Q]
20	20	(Greece) Stefanos Tsitsipas	2,270	400	50	1,920	Second round lost to (Italy) Matteo Gigante [Q]
21	22	(Czech Republic) Tomáš Macháč	2,110	100	10	2,020	First round retired against (France) Quentin Halys
22	21	(France) Ugo Humbert	2,155	10	50	2,195	Second round retired against (United Kingdom) Jacob Fearnley
23	23	(United States) Sebastian Korda	2,020	100	100	2,020	Third round lost to (United States) Frances Tiafoe [15]
24	24	Karen Khachanov	1,960	50	100	2,010	Third round lost to (United States) Tommy Paul [12]
25	25	(Australia) Alexei Popyrin	1,950	10	200	2,140	Fourth round lost to (United States) Tommy Paul [12]
26	29	(Spain) Alejandro Davidovich Fokina	1,770	50	50	1,770	Second round lost to (Czech Republic) Jiří Lehečka
27	31	(Canada) Denis Shapovalov	1,701	100	50	1,651	Second round lost to (Austria) Filip Misolic [Q]
28	32	(United States) Brandon Nakashima	1,690	50	10	1,650	First round lost to (Argentina) Mariano Navone
29	27	(Canada) Félix Auger-Aliassime	1,875	200	10	1,685	First round lost to (Italy) Matteo Arnaldi
30	28	(Poland) Hubert Hurkacz	1,830	200	10	1,640	First round lost to (Brazil) João Fonseca
31	37	(France) Giovanni Mpetshi Perricard	1,414	0	50	1,464	Second round lost to (Bosnia and Herzegovina) Damir Džumhur
32	33	(United States) Alex Michelsen	1,550	10	10	1,550	First round lost to (Argentina) Juan Manuel Cerúndolo [Q]

=== Withdrawn seeded players ===
The following player would have been seeded, but withdrew before the tournament began.

Rank	Player	Points before	Points dropping	Points after	Withdrawal reason
30	(Italy) Matteo Berrettini	1,720	0	1,720	Abdominal injury

== Other entry information ==
=== Wildcards ===
- (France) Térence Atmane
- (France) Arthur Cazaux
- (France) Richard Gasquet
- (France) Pierre-Hugues Herbert
- (United States) Emilio Nava
- (France) Valentin Royer
- (Australia) Tristan Schoolkate
- (Switzerland) Stan Wawrinka

=== Protected ranking ===
- (United States) Reilly Opelka (33)
- (United States) Jenson Brooksby (52)
- (Austria) Sebastian Ofner (74)
- ~~(Finland) Emil Ruusuvuori (83)~~

=== Qualifiers ===
- (Georgia (country)) Nikoloz Basilashvili
- (France) Ugo Blanchet
- (Argentina) Juan Manuel Cerúndolo
- (Italy) Matteo Gigante
- (Germany) Yannick Hanfmann
- (South Africa) Lloyd Harris
- (Lebanon) Benjamin Hassan
- (France) Kyrian Jacquet
- (Spain) Pablo Llamas Ruiz
- (Germany) Maximilian Marterer
- (Austria) Filip Misolic
- (United States) Ethan Quinn
- (Spain) Albert Ramos Viñolas
- (Portugal) Henrique Rocha
- (France) Clément Tabur
- (Italy) Giulio Zeppieri

=== Lucky losers ===
- (Croatia) Marin Čilić
- (Colombia) Daniel Elahi Galán
- (Argentina) Federico Agustín Gómez
- (Denmark) Elmer Møller
- (Kazakhstan) Alexander Shevchenko
- (Argentina) Thiago Agustín Tirante

=== Withdrawals ===
The entry list was released based on the ATP rankings for the week of April 14, 2025.

- ‡ (China) Shang Juncheng (61) → replaced by (Bolivia) Hugo Dellien (101)
- ‡ (China) Zhang Zhizhen (56) → replaced by (Italy) Luca Nardi (102)
- @ (Belgium) David Goffin (52) → replaced by (Kazakhstan) Alexander Shevchenko (LL)
- @ (Italy) Matteo Berrettini (33) → replaced by (Croatia) Marin Čilić (LL)
- @ (Belgium) Raphaël Collignon (83) → replaced by (Denmark) Elmer Møller (LL)
- § (Japan) Kei Nishikori (66) → replaced by (Argentina) Thiago Agustín Tirante (LL)
- § (Finland) Emil Ruusuvuori (83 PR) → replaced by (Argentina) Federico Agustín Gómez (LL)
- § (Spain) Roberto Carballés Baena (55) → replaced by (Colombia) Daniel Elahi Galán (LL)

‡ – withdrew from entry list before qualifying began
@ – withdrew from entry list after qualifying began
§ – withdrew from main draw

Preceded by 2025 Australian Open – Men's singles	Grand Slam men's singles	Succeeded by 2025 Wimbledon Championships – Men's singles
