= John Curry (tennis administrator) =

British businessman (1938–2024)

John Arthur Hugh Curry CBE (7 June 1938 – 19 October 2024) was a British businessman and tennis administrator. He served as chairman of the All England Lawn Tennis and Croquet Club between 1989 and 1999.

== Biography ==
Curry was born on 7 June 1938 to engineer Alfred Robert Curry and his wife Mercia. His family lived in Burma and India for the first decade of his life where his father was involved in the rebuilding of Rangoon after the Second World War. He had two elder brothers. Upon his return to England he was a boarder at King's College School in Wimbledon, where he was eventually Head Boy. He studied philosophy, politics and economics at St Edmund Hall, Oxford. He received a a blue in rugby at Oxford and was the captain of the Oxford tennis team. After Oxford he studied at Harvard Business School for his MBA. He was the recipient of a Distinction and won the Outstanding Foreign Student Award at Harvard. His business career was spent in the electronics industry and he was a chartered accountant. Curry's brother Peter founded the electronics company Unitech and Curry became their finance director in 1966. He launched the electronics distributor Acal in 1986 which was listed publicly in 1993.

Curry was appointed a CBE in the 1997 Birthday Honours. In 2000 Curry was diagnosed with prostate cancer and expected to only live for another five years. He married Anne Lewis in 1962 with whom he had a daughter and three sons. The family lived on a 300-acre estate in Hampshire. He died on 19 October 2024 aged 86.

=== All England Lawn Tennis and Croquet Club ===
Curry was aged 11 when he first visited the All England Lawn Tennis and Croquet Club, taking part in a coaching session for BBC Radio's Children's Hour given by Dinny Pails. Curry was truant from school in 1956 to watch the men's final between Lew Hoad and Ken Rosewall. Curry won the Public Schools Singles Championship and reached the semi-finals in both doubles events and the quarter-finals of the singles at the Junior Championships of Great Britain, known as 'Junior Wimbledon'. Curry was given a temporary membership of All England Club so he could bring the Harvard and Yale Prentice Cup team to practice at the club in the late 1960s. In 1971 he became a full member of the club. He joined the All England Club's committee in 1979. Curry was the youngest chairman of Wimbledon upon appointment at the age of 51, succeeding Buzzer Hadingham. He was elected over Peter Jackson. Curry worked closely alongside the club's chief executive Chris Gorringe during his tenure as chairman. Curry and Gorringe once beat Mark McCormack and Virginia Wade in a mixed doubles match in Tokyo.

In 1990 Curry denied that the club would put back the start date of the championships by a week to give players a greater rest period between Wimbledon and the French Open. Curry met Andre Agassi in Paris in 1990 to ask him to return to Wimbledon after he had missed three successive championships. The American broadcaster NBC once asked if the changeover time could be extended by 30 seconds so more advertising could be shown to which Curry replied that if they ever asked him that again the club would not extend their contract. Curry oversaw the creation and implementation of the 'Long Term Plan' for the club in 1993 which would see the creation of a new No. 1 Court in 1997 and No. 2 Court in 2009.

In June 1991 Curry said that the All England Club would have to "consider seriously" the prospect of moving to Basingstoke if their plans for expansion were denied. The club had bought land in Raynes Park and offered the land and £7 million to the adjoining Wimbledon Club, situated in Wimbledon Park, in order to expand the grounds of the All England club. The Raynes Park land eventually became the All England Club's Community Tennis Centre. In 1993 the club bought the freehold of the adjoining 71 acre Wimbledon Park golf course for £5.2 million. The club also bought the grounds of Southfields College for its croquet pitches.

On 20 June 1994 Curry presented a miniature replica of the trophy given to the gentlemen's singles champions to Prince Edward, Duke of Kent to mark his 25th anniversary as president of the All England Club and a miniature replica of the Venus Rosewater Dish to Katharine, Duchess of Kent. On 1 July 1994 Curry presented a Waterford crystal vase to Fred Perry to commemorate the 60th anniversary of his victory in the 1936 Wimbledon men's singles.

In 1999 the Duchess of Kent was told by Curry in a letter not to bring children to sit with her in the Royal Box on Centre Court and could only invite one guest per day to sit with her. The Times described the duchess as "understood to be bewildered and hurt" by the letter and that to protest she might decline to sit in the royal box expect for finals matches. The Duchess had been previously refused permission to sit there with the 12-year-old son of a bereaved friend. She was allowed to take her godson the following day but not the 12-year-old. Curry subsequently apologised to the duchess, regretting any "unintentional hurt this may have caused Her Royal Highness". He clarified that he had written to her to thank her for her many years supporting the championships but had also "reconfirmed our guidelines concerning the invitation of additional guests and the subject of children".

The financial surplus of the championships rose from slightly over £300,000 at the time of his joining the committee to in excess of £30 million at the point of his departure as chairman.

Curry was succeeded as chairman by Tim Phillips in 1999. He was made an honorary life vice-president upon his retirement as chairman. His obituary published by the All England Club stated that Curry would be remembered " ... as a Chairman who, in the best traditions of Wimbledon, took the Club forward whilst maintaining everything that is special about the Club and The Championships". Phillips described him as a "... very likeable, honourable man, a good, solid player, very consistent and a jovial partner ... He was mischievous – he loved saying something controversial with a big smile on his face and getting away with it".

Curry consistently opposed the awarding of equal prize money to women players at the championships. In 1992 he believed that it was unlikely that women would receive equal prize money until they matched the television ratings and the draw of the spectators of male players. In 1997 he said that the public preferred men's matches to women's matches and this was reflected in ticket sales. In 1998 he said the situation was analogous to boxing where the "heavyweight fighter is paid more than the lightweight". In 1999 he said that it was "strange" that the Women's Tennis Association demanded equal pay yet paid "50 per cent less" than money paid by the Association of Tennis Professionals.

Sporting positions
Preceded by Buzzer Hadingham	Chair of the All England Lawn Tennis and Croquet Club; 1989–1999	Succeeded by Tim Phillips
