= Buzzer Hadingham =

Reginald Edward Hawke Hadingham CBE OBE MC and Bar TD (known as "Buzzer") (6 December 1915 – 27 December 2004) was a British businessman and tennis administrator. He served as chairman of the All England Lawn Tennis and Croquet Club between 1983 and 1989.

== Biography ==
Born Reginald Edward Hawke Hadingham, his name was professionally shortened to R.E.H. Hadingham and he was known as "Buzzer". His nickname derived from his 2-year-old brother's attempt to say 'my baby brother'. He disliked his first name, Reginald. Hadingham was named for the tennis player and Wimbledon champion Reggie Doherty who had once dated his mother and British Admiral Edward Hawke.

Hadingham was born on 6 December 1915 in Scheveningen in the Netherlands. He had three brothers. His father was serving in the Royal Navy in World War I at the time of his birth, but had been interned and joined by his wife, Irene. The family returned to England after the war and lived in Wimbledon. Hadingham would live there for the rest of his life. He was privately educated and attended Rokeby Preparatory School then St Paul's School in London. Hadingham lived in Wimbledon.

After school in 1933 he worked for the racket manufacturer Slazenger for 50 years, retiring in 1983. His father was managing director of Slazenger, Hadingham eventually succeeded him and subsequently became chairman of the company from 1973 to 1976. He served in a number of roles at Slazenger, becoming export manager in 1949, general sales manager in 1951 and managing director from 1969 to 1973.

Hadingham was appointed an OBE in the 1971 New Year Honours, and a CBE in the 1988 New Year Honours.

During the war an encounter with a fellow officer led Hadingham in 1948 to membership of The Sette of Old Volumes, a dining and literary society. In the following decades he served as president of the society on three occasions and was the treasurer for many years. He was the most senior member of the club at the time of his death. His nickname in the club was "Racketeer". Hadingham's posting to Iraq during the war left him with an abiding interest in Ancient Assyria.

He converted to Roman Catholicism during the war. In 1940 he married Lois Pope. Hadingham died in December 2004. He was survived by his wife and their two daughters, Susan and Steffie. Hadingham was an amateur poet and his collection Random Rhymes was published in 1980.

Hadingham worked for many years to raise awareness of the charity Sparks (Sportsmen Pledged to Aid Research into Crippling Diseases). He was chairman of Sparks from 1968 to 1994 and life president from 1995. He helped persuade Douglas Bader and Leonard Cheshire to become president of the charity, a position he also subsequently held. Hadingham and Cheshire were also frequent tennis partners. Hadingham was the president of the International Lawn Tennis Club of Great Britain from 1991 to 2004.

Hadingham reached the second round of the men's singles at the 1936 French Championships and the first round of the men's singles at the 1937 French Championships. Hadingham remained a keen tennis player into his 80s.

=== World War II ===
In January 1939, Hadingham joined the Territorial Army and was subsequently commissioned into the 67th Anti-Tank Regiment, Royal Artillery (TA) on 29 July. His regiment saw action in Iraq, Palestine, Egypt, Libya and North Africa. In November 1942 his regiment transferred to Iraq where they underwent training in desert warfare and river crossings. The regiment embarked on a 3,200-mile journey to Libya in March 1943 as part of the Tunisian Campaign.

In the Italian theatre Hadingham was part of the Battle of Anzio and Operation Avalanche in Salerno during the Allied invasion of Italy. He landed at Salerno on 9 September 1943 as part of 56th (London) Infantry Division, 10th Corps. Hadingham received the Military Cross for his actions in command of 302 Battery when a small infantry force under his command captured recaptured ground near Battipaglia after a German advance. The Medal bar was awarded when he led an attack against a German tank accompanied by 12 infantrymen near the village of Lorenzo as part of the preparations on the Gustav line before the Anzio landings in June 1944. Hadingham commanded the 67th Anti-Tank Regiment during 1945 until it was disbanded in October. He was a Major at the end of 1945 when he retired from the army.

Hadingham never spoke of his experiences in the war. His daughter compiled his memoir of the war, consisting of his 1939 diary, his recollections from 1981 that he collected for the Imperial War Museum and eight essays he wrote that detailed his experiences in Italy in her 2022 book A Black Cat Abroad.

His medals were sold at auction at Noonans Mayfair in July 2025 with an estimate of £1,600-2,000.

=== All England Lawn Tennis and Croquet Club ===
Hadingham was elected to the All England Club in 1957. The club had 357 members at the time he joined. He was part of the Membership Committee of the club from 1976 to 1984. In 1983 Hadingham was elected chairman, succeeding Sir Brian Burnett. His appointment was seen as a modernising force for the All England Club. Hadingham improved the television facilities for media coverage and tackled ticket touts. He also let spectators into the ground several hours earlier than had been permitted before. Hadingham was noted for his good relationships with players. His obituary in The Telegraph described him handling John McEnroe "with a combination of firmness and tact". Prior to the 1987 championships, he had written McEnroe to state, "You will be the first to admit that you do have, shall I say, a volatile temperament. My advice is that, whatever you may think of a linesman's or umpire's call, please keep your cool". Hadingham had also said of McEnroe's behaviour in 1987 that "New York is known as the Big Apple. Sometimes the apple has a worm in it" in reference to McEnroe's outburst at the 1987 US Open. He was vice-president of the club from 1990 to 2004.

In 1984 Hadingham had a a statue of Fred Perry erected on the Wimbledon grounds and renamed the Somerset Road gates the 'Fred Perry Gates' in his honour. In the 1980s Hadingham also reinstated the membership of Wimbledon finalist Bunny Austin which Austin's son believed had lapsed due to his status as a conscientious objector and his work for Moral Re-Armament before the Second World War. Hadingham retired as chairman in September 1989, feeling that a younger person should assume the role. His wife had also suffered a stroke, and he wished to spend more time with her. He described his retirement from the chairmanship as making him feel "rather like the man who sees his mother-in-law driving over Beachy Head in his brand new car". He was succeeded as chairman by John Curry.

His obituary in The Times described him as "spry and brisk in movement and approach, but always amiable in conversation and increasingly appreciated by players for his approachability and for the reforms he encouraged" and his obituary in The Independent described him as "blessed with a sense of humour as well as a knack for generally getting things right".

Sporting positions
Preceded by Brian Burnett	Chair of the All England Lawn Tennis and Croquet Club; 1983–1989	Succeeded by John Curry
