= 2025 Wimbledon Championships – Day-by-day summaries =

The 2025 Wimbledon Championships's order of play for main draw matches on the center court and outside courts, starting from 30 June until 13 July.

All dates are BST (UTC+1).

== Day 1 (30 June) ==
- Seeds out:
  - Gentlemen's Singles: (Denmark) Holger Rune [8], Daniil Medvedev [9], (Argentina) Francisco Cerúndolo [16], (Australia) Alexei Popyrin [20], (Greece) Stefanos Tsitsipas [24], (Netherlands) Tallon Griekspoor [31], (Italy) Matteo Berrettini [32]
  - Ladies' Singles: (Spain) Paula Badosa [9], (Latvia) Jeļena Ostapenko [20], (United States) McCartney Kessler [32]
- Schedule of play

Matches on main courts
Matches on Centre Court
Event	Winner	Loser	Score
Gentlemen's Singles 1st Round	(Spain) Carlos Alcaraz [2]	(Italy) Fabio Fognini	7–5, 6–7^{(5–7)}, 7–5, 2–6, 6–1
Ladies' Singles 1st Round	(United Kingdom) Katie Boulter	(Spain) Paula Badosa [9]	6–2, 3–6, 6–4
Gentlemen's Singles 1st Round	(France) Arthur Rinderknech vs (Germany) Alexander Zverev [3]		7–6^{(7–3)}, 6–7^{(8–10)}, suspended
Matches on No. 1 Court
Event	Winner	Loser	Score
Ladies' Singles 1st Round	Aryna Sabalenka [1]	(Canada) Carson Branstine [Q]	6–1, 7–5
Gentlemen's Singles 1st Round	(Brazil) João Fonseca	(United Kingdom) Jacob Fearnley	6–4, 6–1, 7–6^{(7–5)}
Ladies' Singles 1st Round	(United Kingdom) Emma Raducanu	(United Kingdom) Mingge Xu [WC]	6–3, 6–3
Gentlemen's Singles 1st Round (Note: This match was originally scheduled to play on No. 2 Court but was moved to No. 1 Court due to match overruns.)	(United States) Taylor Fritz [5] vs (France) Giovanni Mpetshi Perricard		6–7^{(6–8)}, 6–7^{(8–10)}, 6–4, 7–6^{(8–6)}, suspended
Matches on No. 2 Court
Event	Winner	Loser	Score
Gentlemen's Singles 1st Round	(France) Benjamin Bonzi	Daniil Medvedev [9]	7–6^{(7–2)}, 3–6, 7–6^{(7–3)}, 6–2
Ladies' Singles 1st Round	(United States) Madison Keys [6]	(Romania) Elena-Gabriela Ruse	6–7^{(4–7)}, 7–5, 7–5
Ladies' Singles 1st Round	(Italy) Jasmine Paolini [4]	(Latvia) Anastasija Sevastova [PR]	2–6, 6–3, 6–2
Matches on No. 3 Court
Event	Winner	Loser	Score
Ladies' Singles 1st Round	(United Kingdom) Sonay Kartal	(Latvia) Jeļena Ostapenko [20]	7–5, 2–6, 6–2
Gentlemen's Singles 1st Round	(Chile) Nicolás Jarry [Q]	(Denmark) Holger Rune [8]	4–6, 4–6, 7–5, 6–3, 6–4
Gentlemen's Singles 1st Round	(Poland) Kamil Majchrzak	(Italy) Matteo Berrettini [32]	4–6, 6–2, 6–4, 5–7, 6–3
Ladies' Singles 1st Round	(Czech Republic) Kateřina Siniaková vs (China) Zheng Qinwen [5]		Postponed
Matches began at 11 am (1:30 pm on Centre Court and 1:00 pm on No. 1 Court) BST

== Day 2 (1 July) ==
- Seeds out:
  - Gentlemen's Singles: (Germany) Alexander Zverev [3], (Italy) Lorenzo Musetti [7], (France) Ugo Humbert [18], (Canada) Denis Shapovalov [27], (Kazakhstan) Alexander Bublik [28], (United States) Alex Michelsen [30]
  - Ladies' Singles: (United States) Coco Gauff [2], (United States) Jessica Pegula [3], (China) Zheng Qinwen [5], (Czech Republic) Karolína Muchová [15], (Poland) Magdalena Fręch [25], (Ukraine) Marta Kostyuk [26], (Poland) Magda Linette [27]
- Schedule of play

Matches on main courts
Matches on Centre Court
Event	Winner	Loser	Score
Ladies' Singles 1st Round	(Czech Republic) Barbora Krejčíková [17]	(Philippines) Alexandra Eala	3–6, 6–2, 6–1
Gentlemen's Singles 1st Round	(France) Arthur Rinderknech	(Germany) Alexander Zverev [3]	7–6^{(7–3)}, 6–7^{(8–10)}, 6–3, 6–7^{(5–7)}, 6–4
Gentlemen's Singles 1st Round	(Serbia) Novak Djokovic [6]	(France) Alexandre Müller	6–1, 6–7^{(7–9)}, 6–2, 6–2
Matches on No. 1 Court
Event	Winner	Loser	Score
Gentlemen's Singles 1st Round	(Italy) Jannik Sinner [1]	(Italy) Luca Nardi	6–4, 6–3, 6–0
Gentlemen's Singles 1st Round	(United States) Taylor Fritz [5]	(France) Giovanni Mpetshi Perricard	6–7^{(6–8)}, 6–7^{(8–10)}, 6–4, 7–6^{(8–6)}, 6–4
Ladies' Singles 1st Round	(United States) Emma Navarro [10]	(Czech Republic) Petra Kvitová [WC]	6–3, 6–1
Gentlemen's Singles 1st Round	(United Kingdom) Jack Draper [4]	(Argentina) Sebastián Báez	6–2, 6–2, 2–1, retired
Ladies' Singles 1st Round (Note: This match was originally scheduled to play on Centre Court but was moved to No. 1 Court due to match overruns.)	(Ukraine) Dayana Yastremska	(United States) Coco Gauff [2]	7–6^{(7–3)}, 6–1
Matches on No. 2 Court
Event	Winner	Loser	Score
Ladies' Singles 1st Round	(Italy) Elisabetta Cocciaretto	(United States) Jessica Pegula [3]	6–2, 6–3
Gentlemen's Singles 1st Round	(Georgia (country)) Nikoloz Basilashvili [Q]	(Italy) Lorenzo Musetti [7]	6–2, 4–6, 7–5, 6–1
Ladies' Singles 1st Round	(Poland) Iga Świątek [8]	Polina Kudermetova	7–5, 6–1
Gentlemen's Singles 1st Round	(United States) Ben Shelton [10]	(Australia) Alex Bolt [Q]	6–4, 7–6^{(7–1)}, 7–6^{(7–4)}
Matches on No. 3 Court
Event	Winner	Loser	Score
Gentlemen's Singles 1st Round	(United States) Tommy Paul [13]	(United Kingdom) Johannus Monday [WC]	6–4, 6–4, 6–2
Ladies' Singles 1st Round	(Czech Republic) Kateřina Siniaková	(China) Zheng Qinwen [5]	7–5, 4–6, 6–1
Ladies' Singles 1st Round	Mirra Andreeva [7]	(Egypt) Mayar Sherif	6–3, 6–3
Gentlemen's Singles 1st Round	(Bulgaria) Grigor Dimitrov [19]	(Japan) Yoshihito Nishioka	6–2, 6–3, 6–4
Matches began at 11 am (1:30 pm on Centre Court and 1:00 pm on No. 1 Court) BST

== Day 3 (2 July) ==
- Seeds out:
  - Gentlemen's Singles: (United States) Frances Tiafoe [12], (Czech Republic) Jiří Lehečka [23]
  - Ladies' Singles: (Italy) Jasmine Paolini [4], Diana Shnaider [12], (Brazil) Beatriz Haddad Maia [21], (Croatia) Donna Vekić [22], (Canada) Leylah Fernandez [29], (United States) Ashlyn Krueger [31]
  - Gentlemen's Doubles: (Sweden) André Göransson / (Netherlands) Sem Verbeek [14]
- Schedule of play

Matches on main courts
Matches on Centre Court
Event	Winner	Loser	Score
Ladies' Singles 2nd Round	Aryna Sabalenka [1]	(Czech Republic) Marie Bouzková	7–6^{(7–4)}, 6–4
Gentlemen's Singles 2nd Round	(Spain) Carlos Alcaraz [2]	(United Kingdom) Oliver Tarvet [Q]	6–1, 6–4, 6–4
Ladies' Singles 2nd Round	(United Kingdom) Emma Raducanu	(Czech Republic) Markéta Vondroušová	6–3, 6–3
Matches on No. 1 Court
Event	Winner	Loser	Score
Gentlemen's Singles 2nd Round	(United Kingdom) Cameron Norrie	(United States) Frances Tiafoe [12]	4–6, 6–4, 6–3, 7–5
Ladies' Singles 2nd Round	(Argentina) Solana Sierra [LL]	(United Kingdom) Katie Boulter	6–7^{(7–9)}, 6–2, 6–1
Gentlemen's Singles 2nd Round	(United States) Taylor Fritz [5]	(Canada) Gabriel Diallo	3−6, 6−3, 7–6^{(7–0)}, 4–6, 6–3
Matches on No. 2 Court
Event	Winner	Loser	Score
Ladies' Singles 2nd Round	(United States) Madison Keys [6]	(Serbia) Olga Danilović	6–4, 6–2
Gentlemen's Singles 2nd Round	(Portugal) Nuno Borges	(United Kingdom) Billy Harris	6–3, 6–4, 7–6^{(9–7)}
Ladies' Singles 2nd Round	(Japan) Naomi Osaka	(Czech Republic) Kateřina Siniaková	6–3, 6–2
Gentlemen's Singles 2nd Round	(United Kingdom) Arthur Fery [WC] vs (Italy) Luciano Darderi		4–6, 3–6, suspended
Matches on No. 3 Court
Event	Winner	Loser	Score
Ladies' Singles 2nd Round	(United Kingdom) Sonay Kartal	(Bulgaria) Viktoriya Tomova	6–2, 6–2
Gentlemen's Singles 2nd Round	Andrey Rublev [14]	(South Africa) Lloyd Harris [PR]	6–7^{(1–7)}, 6–4, 7–6^{(7–5)}, 6–3
Ladies' Singles 2nd Round	Kamilla Rakhimova	(Italy) Jasmine Paolini [4]	4–6, 6–4, 6–4
Matches began at 11 am (1:30 pm on Centre Court and 1:00 pm on No. 1 Court) BST

== Day 4 (3 July) ==
- Seeds out:
  - Gentlemen's Singles: (United Kingdom) Jack Draper [4], (United States) Tommy Paul [13], (Czech Republic) Tomáš Macháč [21], (Canada) Félix Auger-Aliassime [25]
  - Ladies' Singles: (United States) Sofia Kenin [28]
  - Gentlemen's Doubles: (United States) Christian Harrison / (United States) Evan King [9], (United States) Nathaniel Lammons / (United States) Jackson Withrow [13], (Australia) Matthew Ebden / (Australia) John Peers [15]
  - Ladies' Doubles: (Slovakia) Tereza Mihalíková / (United Kingdom) Olivia Nicholls [9]
- Schedule of play

Matches on main courts
Matches on Centre Court
Event	Winner	Loser	Score
Gentlemen's Singles 2nd Round	(Serbia) Novak Djokovic [6]	(United Kingdom) Dan Evans [WC]	6–3, 6–2, 6–0
Ladies' Singles 2nd Round	(Poland) Iga Świątek [8]	(United States) Caty McNally [PR]	5–7, 6–2, 6–1
Gentlemen's Singles 2nd Round	(Italy) Jannik Sinner [1]	(Australia) Aleksandar Vukic	6–1, 6–1, 6–3
Matches on No. 1 Court
Event	Winner	Loser	Score
Ladies' Singles 2nd Round	Mirra Andreeva [7]	(Italy) Lucia Bronzetti	6–1, 7–6^{(7–4)}
Ladies' Singles 2nd Round	(Kazakhstan) Elena Rybakina [11]	(Greece) Maria Sakkari	6–3, 6–1
Gentlemen's Singles 2nd Round	(Croatia) Marin Čilić	(United Kingdom) Jack Draper [4]	6–4, 6–3, 1–6, 6–4
Matches on No. 2 Court
Event	Winner	Loser	Score
Gentlemen's Singles 2nd Round	(Australia) Alex de Minaur [11]	(France) Arthur Cazaux [Q]	4–6, 6–2, 6–4, 6–0
Gentlemen's Singles 2nd Round	(Italy) Luciano Darderi	(United Kingdom) Arthur Fery [WC]	6–4, 6–3, 6–3
Ladies' Singles 2nd Round	(Czech Republic) Barbora Krejčíková [17]	(United States) Caroline Dolehide	6–4, 3–6, 6–2
Ladies' Singles 2nd Round	(Spain) Jéssica Bouzas Maneiro	(United States) Sofia Kenin [28]	6–1, 7–6^{(7–4)}
Gentlemen's Singles 2nd Round	(United States) Ben Shelton [10] vs (Australia) Rinky Hijikata		6–2, 7–5, 5–4, suspended
Matches on No. 3 Court
Event	Winner	Loser	Score
Ladies' Singles 2nd Round	(United States) Emma Navarro [10]	Veronika Kudermetova	6–1, 6–2
Gentlemen's Singles 2nd Round	(Bulgaria) Grigor Dimitrov [19]	(France) Corentin Moutet	7–5, 4–6, 7–5, 7–5
Gentlemen's Singles 2nd Round	(Austria) Sebastian Ofner [PR]	(United States) Tommy Paul [13]	1–6, 7–5, 6–4, 7–5
Ladies' Singles 2nd Round	(Australia) Daria Kasatkina [16]	(Romania) Irina-Camelia Begu	6–2, 4–6, 6–1
Matches began at 11 am (1:30 pm on Centre Court and 1:00 pm on No. 1 Court) BST

== Day 5 (4 July) ==
- Seeds out:
  - Gentlemen's Singles: (Spain) Alejandro Davidovich Fokina [26]
  - Ladies' Singles: (United States) Madison Keys [6], (Ukraine) Elina Svitolina [14]
  - Gentlemen's Doubles: (Croatia) Nikola Mektić / (New Zealand) Michael Venus [8], (France) Sadio Doumbia / (France) Fabien Reboul [11]
  - Ladies' Doubles: (Italy) Sara Errani / (Italy) Jasmine Paolini [3]
  - Mixed Doubles: (Germany) Kevin Krawietz / (Australia) Ellen Perez [7]
- Schedule of play

Matches on main courts
Matches on Centre Court
Event	Winner	Loser	Score
Gentlemen's Singles 3rd Round	(United States) Taylor Fritz [5]	(Spain) Alejandro Davidovich Fokina [26]	6–4, 6–3, 6–7^{(5–7)}, 6–1
Gentlemen's Singles 3rd Round	(Spain) Carlos Alcaraz [2]	(Germany) Jan-Lennard Struff	6–1, 3–6, 6–3, 6–4
Ladies' Singles 3rd Round	Aryna Sabalenka [1]	(United Kingdom) Emma Raducanu	7−6^{(8−6)}, 6−4
Matches on No. 1 Court
Event	Winner	Loser	Score
Ladies' Singles 3rd Round	(United Kingdom) Sonay Kartal	(France) Diane Parry [Q]	6–4, 6–2
Gentlemen's Singles 3rd Round	(United Kingdom) Cameron Norrie	(Italy) Mattia Bellucci	7–6^{(7–5)}, 6–4, 6–3
Ladies' Singles 3rd Round	(Belgium) Elise Mertens [24]	(Ukraine) Elina Svitolina [14]	6–1, 7–6^{(7–4)}
Matches on No. 2 Court
Event	Winner	Loser	Score
Ladies' Singles 3rd Round	Anastasia Pavlyuchenkova	(Japan) Naomi Osaka	3–6, 6–4, 6–4
Gentlemen's Singles 2nd Round	(United States) Ben Shelton [10]	(Australia) Rinky Hijikata	6–2, 7–5, 6–4
Ladies' Singles 3rd Round	(Germany) Laura Siegemund	(United States) Madison Keys [6]	6–3, 6–3
Gentlemen's Singles 3rd Round	(Chile) Nicolás Jarry [Q]	(Brazil) João Fonseca	6–3, 6–4, 3–6, 7–6^{(7–4)}
Matches on No. 3 Court
Event	Winner	Loser	Score
Ladies' Singles 3rd Round	(United States) Amanda Anisimova [13]	(Hungary) Dalma Galfi [Q]	6–3, 5–7, 6–3
Gentlemen's Singles 3rd Round	Andrey Rublev [14]	(France) Adrian Mannarino [Q]	7–5, 6–2, 6–3
Gentlemen's Singles 3rd Round	Karen Khachanov [17]	(Portugal) Nuno Borges	7–6^{(8–6)}, 4–6, 4–6, 6–3, 7–6^{(10–8)}
Matches began at 11 am (1:30 pm on Centre Court and 1:00 pm on No. 1 Court) BST

== Day 6 (5 July) ==
- Seeds out:
  - Gentlemen's Singles: (Czech Republic) Jakub Menšík [15], (United States) Brandon Nakashima [29]
  - Ladies' Singles: (Kazakhstan) Elena Rybakina [11], (Australia) Daria Kasatkina [16], (Czech Republic) Barbora Krejčíková [17]
  - Gentlemen's Doubles: (Italy) Simone Bolelli / (Italy) Andrea Vavassori [7]
  - Ladies' Doubles: (United States) Asia Muhammad / (Netherlands) Demi Schuurs [6], (China) Jiang Xinyu / (Chinese Taipei) Wu Fang-hsien [12]
  - Mixed Doubles: (Finland) Harri Heliövaara / (Kazakhstan) Anna Danilina [1], (Croatia) Nikola Mektić / (Canada) Gabriela Dabrowski [5], (New Zealand) Michael Venus / (New Zealand) Erin Routliffe [6]
- Schedule of play

Matches on main courts
Matches on Centre Court
Event	Winner	Loser	Score
Gentlemen's Singles 3rd Round	(Italy) Jannik Sinner [1]	(Spain) Pedro Martínez	6−1, 6−3, 6−1
Ladies' Singles 3rd Round	(Poland) Iga Świątek [8]	(United States) Danielle Collins	6–2, 6–3
Gentlemen's Singles 3rd Round	(Serbia) Novak Djokovic [6]	(Serbia) Miomir Kecmanović	6–3, 6–0, 6–4
Matches on No. 1 Court
Event	Winner	Loser	Score
Ladies' Singles 3rd Round	Mirra Andreeva [7]	(United States) Hailey Baptiste	6–1, 6–3
Ladies' Singles 3rd Round	(United States) Emma Navarro [10]	(Czech Republic) Barbora Krejčíková [17]	2–6, 6–3, 6–4
Gentlemen's Singles 3rd Round	(United States) Ben Shelton [10]	(Hungary) Márton Fucsovics [LL]	6–3, 7–6^{(7–4)}, 6–2
Matches on No. 2 Court
Event	Winner	Loser	Score
Ladies' Singles 3rd Round	(Denmark) Clara Tauson [23]	(Kazakhstan) Elena Rybakina [11]	7–6^{(8–6)}, 6–3
Gentlemen's Singles 3rd Round	(Australia) Alex de Minaur [11]	(Denmark) August Holmgren [Q]	6–4, 7–6^{(7–5)}, 6–3
Gentlemen's Doubles 2nd Round	(United Kingdom) Julian Cash [5] (United Kingdom) Lloyd Glasspool [5]	(Germany) Hendrik Jebens (France) Albano Olivetti	6–3, 6–4
Matches on No. 3 Court
Event	Winner	Loser	Score
Ladies' Singles 3rd Round	Liudmila Samsonova [19]	(Australia) Daria Kasatkina [16]	6–2, 6–3
Gentlemen's Singles 3rd Round	(Bulgaria) Grigor Dimitrov [19]	(Austria) Sebastian Ofner [PR]	6–3, 6–4, 7–6^{(7–0)}
Ladies' Doubles 2nd Round	(United States) Caroline Dolehide [16] (United States) Sofia Kenin [16]	(United Kingdom) Ella McDonald [WC] (United Kingdom) Mingge Xu [WC]	6–2, 6–3
Matches began at 11 am (1:30 pm on Centre Court and 1:00 pm on No. 1 Court) BST

== Day 7 (6 July) ==
- Seeds out:
  - Gentlemen's Singles: Andrey Rublev [14]
  - Ladies' Singles: (Belgium) Elise Mertens [24], (Czech Republic) Linda Nosková [30]
  - Gentlemen's Doubles: (Germany) Kevin Krawietz / (Germany) Tim Pütz [3]
  - Ladies' Doubles: Mirra Andreeva / Diana Shnaider [5], Ekaterina Alexandrova / (China) Zhang Shuai [14], (United States) Nicole Melichar-Martinez / Liudmila Samsonova [15]
  - Mixed Doubles: (Italy) Sara Errani / (Italy) Andrea Vavassori [3], (United States) Evan King / (United States) Taylor Townsend [4]
- Schedule of play

Matches on main courts
Matches on Centre Court
Event	Winner	Loser	Score
Ladies' Singles 4th Round	Anastasia Pavlyuchenkova	(United Kingdom) Sonay Kartal	7–6^{(7–3)}, 6–4
Ladies' Singles 4th Round	Aryna Sabalenka [1]	(Belgium) Elise Mertens [24]	6–4, 7–6^{(7–4)}
Gentlemen's Singles 4th Round	(Spain) Carlos Alcaraz [2]	Andrey Rublev [14]	6–7^{(5–7)}, 6–3, 6–4, 6–4
Matches on No. 1 Court
Event	Winner	Loser	Score
Gentlemen's Singles 4th Round	(United States) Taylor Fritz [5]	(Australia) Jordan Thompson	6–1, 3–0, retired
Gentlemen's Singles 4th Round	(United Kingdom) Cameron Norrie	(Chile) Nicolás Jarry [Q]	6–3, 7–6^{(7–4)}, 6–7^{(7–9)}, 6–7^{(5–7)}, 6–3
Ladies' Singles 4th Round	(United States) Amanda Anisimova [13]	(Czech Republic) Linda Nosková [30]	6–2, 5–7, 6–4
Matches on No. 2 Court
Event	Winner	Loser	Score
Gentlemen's Singles 4th Round	Karen Khachanov [17]	(Poland) Kamil Majchrzak	6–4, 6–2, 6–3
Ladies' Singles 4th Round	(Germany) Laura Siegemund	(Argentina) Solana Sierra [LL]	6–3, 6–2
Mixed Doubles 2nd Round	(United Kingdom) Joe Salisbury (Brazil) Luisa Stefani	(Argentina) Andrés Molteni (United States) Asia Muhammad	7–6^{(9–7)}, 7–6^{(7–5)}
Matches on No. 3 Court
Event	Winner	Loser	Score
Gentlemen's Doubles 3rd Round	(El Salvador) Marcelo Arévalo [1] (Croatia) Mate Pavić [1]	(Czech Republic) Petr Nouza (Czech Republic) Patrik Rikl	7–5, 7–6^{(15–13)}
Ladies' Doubles 3rd Round	(Czech Republic) Kateřina Siniaková [1] (United States) Taylor Townsend [1]	(United States) Nicole Melichar-Martinez [15] Liudmila Samsonova [15]	6–7^{(5–7)}, 6–1, 6–4
Mixed Doubles 2nd Round	(Croatia) Mate Pavić [8] (Hungary) Tímea Babos [8]	(United Kingdom) David Stevenson [WC] (United Kingdom) Maia Lumsden [WC]	6–3, 6–4
Matches began at 11 am (1:30 pm on Centre Court and 1:00 pm on No. 1 Court) BST

== Day 8 (7 July) ==
- Seeds out:
  - Gentlemen's Singles: (Australia) Alex de Minaur [11], (Bulgaria) Grigor Dimitrov [19]
  - Ladies' Singles: (United States) Emma Navarro [10], Ekaterina Alexandrova [18], (Denmark) Clara Tauson [23]
  - Gentlemen's Doubles: (Argentina) Máximo González / (Argentina) Andrés Molteni [12], (India) Yuki Bhambri / (United States) Robert Galloway [16]
  - Ladies' Doubles: (Ukraine) Lyudmyla Kichenok / (Australia) Ellen Perez [7], (Brazil) Beatriz Haddad Maia / (Germany) Laura Siegemund [11], Irina Khromacheva / (Hungary) Fanny Stollár [13]
- Schedule of play

Matches on main courts
Matches on Centre Court
Event	Winner	Loser	Score
Gentlemen's Singles 4th Round	(Serbia) Novak Djokovic [6]	(Australia) Alex de Minaur [11]	1–6, 6–4, 6–4, 6–4
Ladies' Singles 4th Round	Mirra Andreeva [7]	(United States) Emma Navarro [10]	6–2, 6–3
Gentlemen's Singles 4th Round	(Italy) Jannik Sinner [1]	(Bulgaria) Grigor Dimitrov [19]	3–6, 5–7, 2–2, retired
Matches on No. 1 Court
Event	Winner	Loser	Score
Ladies' Singles 4th Round	(Switzerland) Belinda Bencic	Ekaterina Alexandrova [18]	7–6^{(7–4)}, 6–4
Gentlemen's Singles 4th Round	(United States) Ben Shelton [10]	(Italy) Lorenzo Sonego	3−6, 6−1, 7–6^{(7–1)}, 7–5
Ladies' Singles 4th Round	(Poland) Iga Świątek [8]	(Denmark) Clara Tauson [23]	6–4, 6–1
Matches on No. 2 Court
Event	Winner	Loser	Score
Gentlemen's Singles 4th Round	(Italy) Flavio Cobolli [22]	(Croatia) Marin Čilić	6–4, 6–4, 6–7^{(4–7)}, 7–6^{(7–3)}
Ladies' Singles 4th Round	Liudmila Samsonova [19]	(Spain) Jéssica Bouzas Maneiro	7–5, 7–5
Ladies' Doubles 3rd Round	(United States) Caroline Dolehide [16] (United States) Sofia Kenin [16]	(Chinese Taipei) Chan Hao-ching (Czech Republic) Barbora Krejčíková	Walkover
Mixed Doubles Quarterfinals	(United Kingdom) Joe Salisbury (Brazil) Luisa Stefani	(Poland) Jan Zieliński (Chinese Taipei) Hsieh Su-wei	7–6^{(9–7)}, 6–3
Matches on No. 3 Court
Event	Winner	Loser	Score
Gentlemen's Doubles 3rd Round	(United Kingdom) Julian Cash [5] (United Kingdom) Lloyd Glasspool [5]	(Argentina) Guido Andreozzi (Brazil) Marcelo Demoliner	6–3, 6–4
Ladies' Doubles 3rd Round	(Canada) Gabriela Dabrowski [2] (New Zealand) Erin Routliffe [2]	Irina Khromacheva [13] (Hungary) Fanny Stollár [13]	7–6^{(7–1)}, 7–6^{(7–2)}
Mixed Doubles Quarterfinals	(Netherlands) Sem Verbeek (Czech Republic) Kateřina Siniaková	(United Kingdom) Joshua Paris [WC] (United Kingdom) Eden Silva [WC]	7–6^{(7–5)}, 6–3
Mixed Doubles Quarterfinals	(El Salvador) Marcelo Arévalo [2] (China) Zhang Shuai [2]	(United Kingdom) N Skupski (United States) Desirae Krawczyk	7–5, 7–6^{(9–7)}
Matches began at 11 am (1:30 pm on Centre Court and 1:00 pm on No. 1 Court) BST

== Day 9 (8 July) ==
- Seeds out:
  - Gentlemen's Singles: Karen Khachanov [17]
  - Gentlemen's Doubles: (Monaco) Hugo Nys / (France) Édouard Roger-Vasselin [10]
  - Ladies' Doubles: (Canada) Gabriela Dabrowski / (New Zealand) Erin Routliffe [2], (United States) Caroline Dolehide / (United States) Sofia Kenin [16]
  - Mixed Doubles: (El Salvador) Marcelo Arévalo / (China) Zhang Shuai [2], (Croatia) Mate Pavić / (Hungary) Tímea Babos [8]
- Schedule of play

Matches on main courts
Matches on Centre Court
Event	Winner	Loser	Score
Ladies' Singles Quarter-finals	Aryna Sabalenka [1]	(Germany) Laura Siegemund	4–6, 6–2, 6–4
Gentlemen's Singles Quarter-finals	(Spain) Carlos Alcaraz [2]	(United Kingdom) Cameron Norrie	6–2, 6–3, 6–3
Matches on No. 1 Court
Event	Winner	Loser	Score
Gentlemen's Singles Quarter-finals	(United States) Taylor Fritz [5]	Karen Khachanov [17]	6–3, 6–4, 1–6, 7–6^{(7–4)}
Ladies' Singles Quarter-finals	(United States) Amanda Anisimova [13]	Anastasia Pavlyuchenkova	6–1, 7–6^{(11–9)}
Ladies' Doubles Quarter-finals	Veronika Kudermetova [8] (Belgium) Elise Mertens [8]	(Canada) Gabriela Dabrowski [2] (New Zealand) Erin Routliffe [2]	7–5, 7–6^{(7–4)}
Matches on No. 2 Court
Event	Winner	Loser	Score
Gentlemen's Doubles Quarter-finals	(Australia) Rinky Hijikata [Alt] (Netherlands) David Pel [Alt]	(Brazil) Rafael Matos (Brazil) Marcelo Melo	7–6^{(7–5)}, 6–4
Ladies' Doubles Quarter-finals	(Australia) Olivia Gadecki (United States) Desirae Krawczyk	(United States) Caroline Dolehide [16] (United States) Sofia Kenin [16]	6–2, 6–3
Gentlemen's Invitation Doubles Round Robin	(United States) Bob Bryan (United States) Mike Bryan	(Germany) Tommy Haas (Spain) Feliciano López	6–3, 7–6^{(7–4)}
Mixed Doubles Semi-finals	(United Kingdom) Joe Salisbury (Brazil) Luisa Stefani	(El Salvador) Marcelo Arévalo [2] (China) Zhang Shuai [2]	7–6^{(8–6)}, 7–6^{(7–4)}
Matches on No. 3 Court
Event	Winner	Loser	Score
Gentlemen's Wheelchair Singles 1st Round	(United Kingdom) Alfie Hewett [2]	(Spain) Daniel Caverzaschi	6–1, 6–2
Gentlemen's Wheelchair Singles 1st Round	(United Kingdom) Gordon Reid	(Belgium) Joachim Gérard	5–7, 6–4, 7–6^{(10–6)}
Ladies' Wheelchair Singles 1st Round	(Netherlands) Diede de Groot [3]	(United Kingdom) Lucy Shuker [WC]	6–1, 6–1
Ladies' Wheelchair Singles 1st Round	(France) Ksénia Chasteau	(Netherlands) Aniek van Koot [2]	6–2, 7–6^{(7–5)}
Matches began at 11 am (1:30 pm on Centre Court and 1:00 pm on No. 1 Court) BST

== Day 10 (9 July) ==
- Seeds out:
  - Gentlemen's Singles: (United States) Ben Shelton [10], (Italy) Flavio Cobolli [22]
  - Ladies' Singles: Mirra Andreeva [7], Liudmila Samsonova [19]
  - Gentlemen's Doubles: (Finland) Harri Heliövaara / (United Kingdom) Henry Patten [2], (United Kingdom) Joe Salisbury / (United Kingdom) Neal Skupski [6]
  - Ladies' Doubles: (Hungary) Tímea Babos / (Brazil) Luisa Stefani [10]
- Schedule of play

Matches on main courts
Matches on Centre Court
Event	Winner	Loser	Score
Ladies' Singles Quarter-finals	(Switzerland) Belinda Bencic	Mirra Andreeva [7]	7–6^{(7–3)}, 7–6^{(7–2)}
Gentlemen's Singles Quarter-finals	(Serbia) Novak Djokovic [6]	(Italy) Flavio Cobolli [22]	6–7^{(6–8)}, 6–2, 7–5, 6–4
Matches on No. 1 Court
Event	Winner	Loser	Score
Ladies' Singles Quarter-finals	(Poland) Iga Świątek [8]	Liudmila Samsonova [19]	6–2, 7–5
Gentlemen's Singles Quarter-finals	(Italy) Jannik Sinner [1]	(United States) Ben Shelton [10]	7–6^{(7–2)}, 6–4, 6–4
Ladies' Invitation Doubles Round Robin	(Zimbabwe) Cara Black (Switzerland) Martina Hingis	(Slovakia) Daniela Hantuchová (United States) CoCo Vandeweghe	6–2, 6–4
Matches on No. 2 Court
Event	Winner	Loser	Score
Gentlemen's Doubles Quarter-finals	(United Kingdom) Julian Cash [5] (United Kingdom) Lloyd Glasspool [5]	(Finland) Harri Heliövaara [2] (United Kingdom) Henry Patten [2]	6–4, 4–6, 7–6^{(10–8)}
Ladies' Doubles Quarter-finals	(Chinese Taipei) Hsieh Su-wei [4] (Latvia) Jeļena Ostapenko [4]	(Romania) Sorana Cîrstea; Anna Kalinskaya	6–7^{(4–7)}, 6–3, 6–2
Ladies' Invitation Doubles Round Robin	(Poland) Agnieszka Radwańska (Slovakia) Magdaléna Rybáriková	(Netherlands) Kiki Bertens (United Kingdom) Johanna Konta	6–1, 4–6, [10–2]
Gentlemen's Invitation doubles Round Robin	(United States) Bob Bryan (United States) Mike Bryan	(Colombia) Juan Sebastián Cabal (Colombia) Robert Farah	6–1, 7–6^{(9–7)}
Matches on No. 3 Court
Event	Winner	Loser	Score
Gentlemen's Wheelchair Doubles Quarter-finals	(United Kingdom) Alfie Hewett [1] (United Kingdom) Gordon Reid [1]	(Japan) Takuya Miki (United States) Casey Ratzlaff	6–3, 6–2
Gentlemen's Doubles Quarter-finals	(Spain) Marcel Granollers [4] (Argentina) Horacio Zeballos [4]	(United Kingdom) Joe Salisbury [6] (United Kingdom) Neal Skupski [6]	7–6^{(8–6)}, 7–6^{(7–3)}
Ladies' Doubles Quarter-finals	(Czech Republic) Kateřina Siniaková [1] (United States) Taylor Townsend [1]	(Hungary) Tímea Babos [10] (Brazil) Luisa Stefani [10]	7–6^{(7–2)}, 6–3
Mixed Invitation Doubles Round Robin	(Sweden) Thomas Johansson (United Kingdom) Katie O'Brien	(Australia) Todd Woodbridge (Australia) Alicia Molik	6–1, 6–3
Matches began at 11 am (1:30 pm on Centre Court and 1:00 pm on No. 1 Court) BST

== Day 11 (10 July) ==
- Seeds out:
  - Ladies' Singles: Aryna Sabalenka [1]
  - Gentlemen's Doubles: (El Salvador) Marcelo Arévalo / (Croatia) Mate Pavić [1], (Spain) Marcel Granollers / (Argentina) Horacio Zeballos [4]
- Schedule of play

Matches on main courts
Matches on Centre Court
Event	Winner	Loser	Score
Ladies' Singles Semi-finals	(United States) Amanda Anisimova [13]	Aryna Sabalenka [1]	6–4, 4–6, 6–4
Ladies' Singles Semi-finals	(Poland) Iga Świątek [8]	(Switzerland) Belinda Bencic	6–2, 6–0
Mixed Doubles Final	(Netherlands) Sem Verbeek (Czech Republic) Kateřina Siniaková	(United Kingdom) Joe Salisbury (Brazil) Luisa Stefani	7−6^{(7−3)}, 7−6^{(7−3)}
Matches on No. 1 Court
Event	Winner	Loser	Score
Gentlemen's Doubles Semi-finals	(Australia) Rinky Hijikata [Alt] (Netherlands) David Pel [Alt]	(El Salvador) Marcelo Arévalo [1] (Croatia) Mate Pavić [1]	6–7^{(2–7)}, 7–6^{(7–5)}, 7–6^{(11–9)}
Gentlemen's Doubles Semi-finals	(United Kingdom) Julian Cash [5] (United Kingdom) Lloyd Glasspool [5]	(Spain) Marcel Granollers [4] (Argentina) Horacio Zeballos [4]	6–3, 6–4
Gentlemen' Wheelchair Doubles Semi-finals	(United Kingdom) Alfie Hewett [1] (United Kingdom) Gordon Reid [1]	(Spain) Daniel Caverzaschi (Japan) Tokito Oda	3–6, 6–4, 6–0
Matches on No. 2 Court
Event	Winner	Loser	Score
Gentlemen's Invitation Doubles Round Robin	(Germany) Tommy Haas (Spain) Feliciano López	(Sweden) Robert Lindstedt (Romania) Horia Tecău	3–6, 6–4, [10–6]
Ladies' Invitation Doubles Round Robin	(Slovakia) Dominika Cibulková (Czech Republic) Barbora Strýcová	(Belgium) Kirsten Flipkens (Germany) Andrea Petkovic	6–4, 6–4
Gentlemen's Invitation Doubles Round Robin	(France) Jérémy Chardy (Brazil) Bruno Soares	(Cyprus) Marcos Baghdatis (Belgium) Xavier Malisse	7–6^{(11–9)}, 3–6, [10–7]
Ladies' Invitation Doubles Round Robin	(United Kingdom) Naomi Broady (United States) Vania King	(France) Tatiana Golovin (United Kingdom) Laura Robson	6–4, 6–4
Ladies' Invitation Doubles Round Robin	(Poland) Agnieszka Radwańska (Slovakia) Magdaléna Rybáriková	(Slovakia) Daniela Hantuchová (United States) CoCo Vandeweghe	6–4, 6–3
Matches on No. 3 Court
Event	Winner	Loser	Score
Gentlemen's Wheelchair Singles 2nd Round	(United Kingdom) Alfie Hewett [2]	(China) Ji Zhenxu	6–1, 6–1
Ladies' Wheelchair Singles 2nd Round	(China) Li Xiaohui	(Netherlands) Diede de Groot [3]	7–6^{(8–6)}, 6–4
Girls' Singles Quarter-finals	(United Kingdom) Mimi Xu	(Austria) Lilli Tagger [3]	7–6^{(7–4)}, 6–1
Mixed Invitation Doubles Round Robin	(United Kingdom) Greg Rusedski (Spain) Conchita Martínez	(Iran) Mansour Bahrami (China) Zheng Jie	6–6, 1–6, [10–6]
Matches began at 11 am (1:30 pm on Centre Court and 1:00 pm on No. 1 Court) BST

== Day 12 (11 July) ==
- Seeds out:
  - Gentlemen's Singles: (United States) Taylor Fritz [5], (Serbia) Novak Djokovic [6]
  - Ladies' Doubles: (Czech Republic) Kateřina Siniaková / (United States) Taylor Townsend [1]
- Schedule of play

Matches on main courts
Matches on Centre Court
Event	Winner	Loser	Score
Gentlemen's Singles Semi-finals	(Spain) Carlos Alcaraz [2]	(United States) Taylor Fritz [5]	6–4, 5–7, 6–3, 7–6^{(8–6)}
Gentlemen's Singles Semi-finals	(Italy) Jannik Sinner [1]	(Serbia) Novak Djokovic [6]	6–3, 6–3, 6–4
Matches on No. 1 Court
Event	Winner	Loser	Score
Ladies' Doubles Semi-finals	Veronika Kudermetova [8] (Belgium) Elise Mertens [8]	(Australia) Olivia Gadecki (United States) Desirae Krawczyk	3–6, 6–0, 6–3
Gentlemen' Wheelchair Singles Semi-finals	(United Kingdom) Alfie Hewett [2]	(Spain) Martín de la Puente [3]	6–0, 7–5
Ladies' Doubles Semi-finals	(Chinese Taipei) Hsieh Su-wei [4] (Latvia) Jeļena Ostapenko [4]	(Czech Republic) Kateřina Siniaková [1] (United States) Taylor Townsend [1]	7–5, 6–4
Matches on No. 3 Court
Event	Winner	Loser	Score
Ladies' Invitation Doubles Round Robin	(Belgium) Kirsten Flipkens (Germany) Andrea Petkovic	(United Kingdom) Naomi Broady (United States) Vania King	7−6^{(7−4)}, 6–4
Mixed Invitation Doubles Round Robin	(Australia) Todd Woodbridge (Australia) Alicia Molik	(United Kingdom) Greg Rusedski (Spain) Conchita Martínez	7–5, 0–0, retired
Gentlemen's Wheelchair Singles Semi-finals	(Japan) Tokito Oda [1]	(Argentina) Gustavo Fernández [4]	7–5, 6–1
Gentlemen's Invitation Doubles Round Robin	(United States) Bob Bryan (United States) Mike Bryan	(Sweden) Robert Lindstedt (Romania) Horia Tecău	6–3, 6–3
Ladies' Invitation Doubles Round Robin	(Zimbabwe) Cara Black (Switzerland) Martina Hingis	(Netherlands) Kiki Bertens (United Kingdom) Johanna Konta	6–2, 6–2
Mixed Invitation Doubles Round Robin	(France) Sébastien Grosjean (Croatia) Iva Majoli	(Serbia) Nenad Zimonjić (United States) Martina Navratilova	Walkover
Matches began at 11 am (1:30 pm on Centre Court and 1:00 pm on No. 1 Court) BST

== Day 13 (12 July) ==
- Seeds out:
  - Ladies' Singles: (United States) Amanda Anisimova [13]
- Schedule of play

Matches on main courts
Matches on Centre Court
Event	Winner	Loser	Score
Gentlemen's Doubles Final	(United Kingdom) Julian Cash [5] (United Kingdom) Lloyd Glasspool [5]	(Australia) Rinky Hijikata [Alt] (Netherlands) David Pel [Alt]	6–2, 7–6^{(7–3)}
Ladies' Singles Final	(Poland) Iga Świątek [8]	(United States) Amanda Anisimova [13]	6–0, 6–0
Matches on No. 1 Court
Event	Winner	Loser	Score
Gentlemen's Wheelchair Doubles Final	(Spain) Martín de la Puente [2] (Netherlands) Ruben Spaargaren [2]	(United Kingdom) Alfie Hewett [1] (United Kingdom) Gordon Reid [1]	7–6^{(7–1)}, 7–5
Boys' Doubles Final	(Finland) Oskari Paldanius [4] (Poland) Alan Ważny [4]	(United Kingdom) Oliver Bonding [8] (United States) Jagger Leach [8]	5–7, 7–6^{(8–6)}, [10–5]
Girls' Singles Final	(Slovakia) Mia Pohánková	(United States) Julieta Pareja [6]	6–3, 6–1
Matches on No. 3 Court
Event	Winner	Loser	Score
Ladies' Wheelchair Singles Final	(China) Wang Ziying [4]	(Japan) Yui Kamiji [1]	6–3, 6–3
Quad Wheelchair Doubles Final	(Israel) Guy Sasson [1] (Netherlands) Niels Vink [1]	(South Africa) Donald Ramphadi (United Kingdom) Gregory Slade	6–0, 6–2
Matches began at 11 am (1:00 pm on Centre Court) BST

== Day 14 (13 July) ==
- Seeds out:
  - Gentlemen's Singles: (Spain) Carlos Alcaraz [2]
  - Ladies' Doubles: (Chinese Taipei) Hsieh Su-wei / (Latvia) Jeļena Ostapenko [4]
- Schedule of play

Matches on main courts
Matches on Centre Court
Event	Winner	Loser	Score
Ladies' Doubles Final	Veronika Kudermetova [8] (Belgium) Elise Mertens [8]	(Chinese Taipei) Hsieh Su-wei [4] (Latvia) Jeļena Ostapenko [4]	3–6, 6–2, 6–4
Gentlemen's Singles Final	(Italy) Jannik Sinner [1]	(Spain) Carlos Alcaraz [2]	4–6, 6–4, 6–4, 6–4
Matches on No. 1 Court
Event	Winner	Loser	Score
Gentlemen's Wheelchair Singles Final	(Japan) Tokito Oda [1]	(United Kingdom) Alfie Hewett [2]	3–6, 7–5, 6–2
Boys' Singles Final	(Bulgaria) Ivan Ivanov [6]	(United States) Ronit Karki [Q]	6–2, 6–3
Ladies' Invitation Doubles Final	(Zimbabwe) Cara Black (Switzerland) Martina Hingis	(Slovakia) Dominika Cibulková (Czech Republic) Barbora Strýcová	6–2, 6–3
Matches on No. 3 Court
Event	Winner	Loser	Score
Wheelchair Quad Singles Final	(Netherlands) Niels Vink [1]	(Netherlands) Sam Schröder [2]	6–3, 6–3
Ladies' Wheelchair Doubles Final	(China) Li Xiaohui [2] (China) Wang Ziying [2]	(Colombia) Angélica Bernal (France) Ksénia Chasteau	6–3, 6–1
Matches began at 11 am (1:00 pm on Centre Court) BST
