= Henman Hill =

Area on the grounds of the All England Club

Coordinates: 51.435564°N 0.215982°W

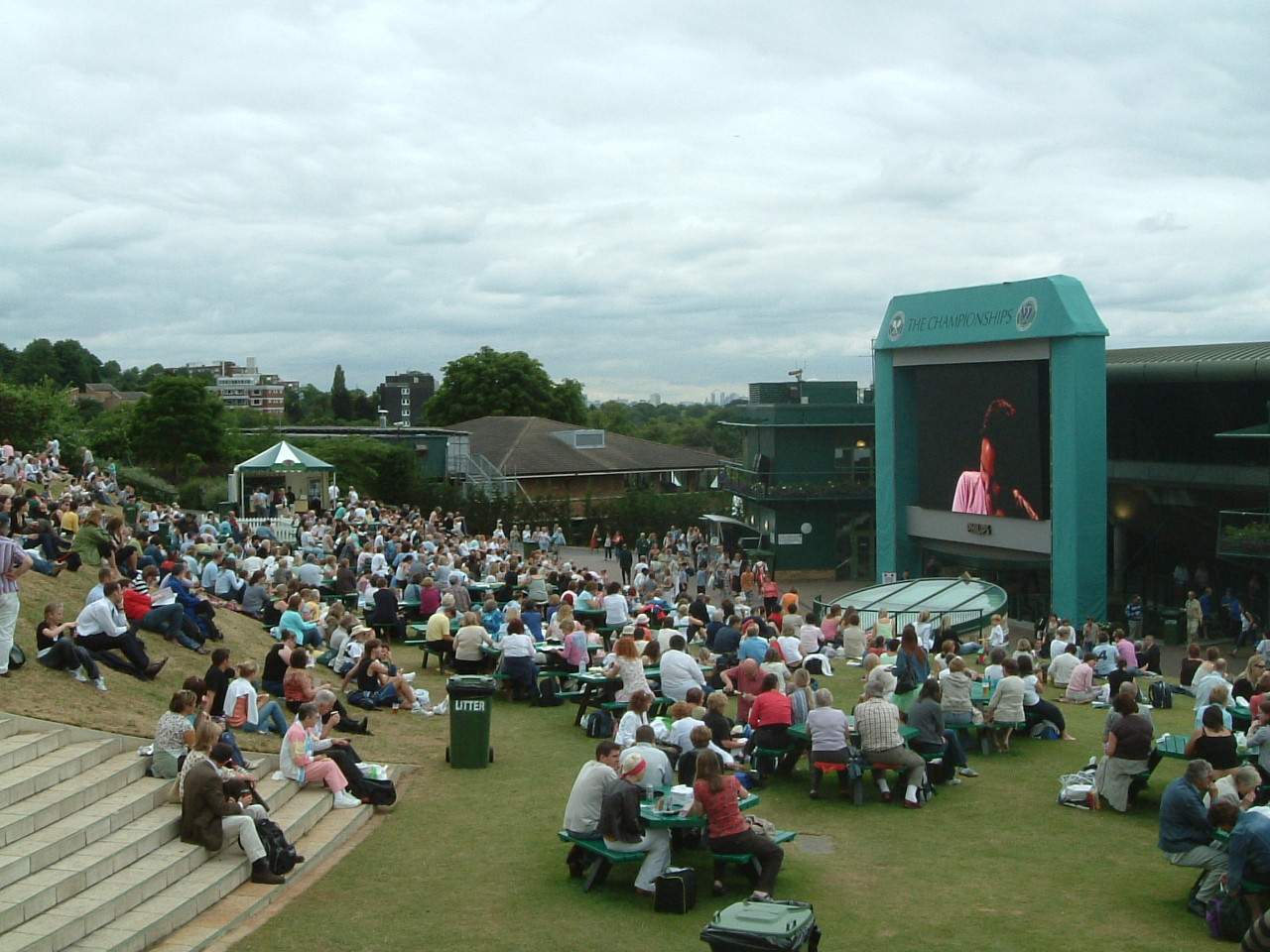
"Aorangi Terrace", side view

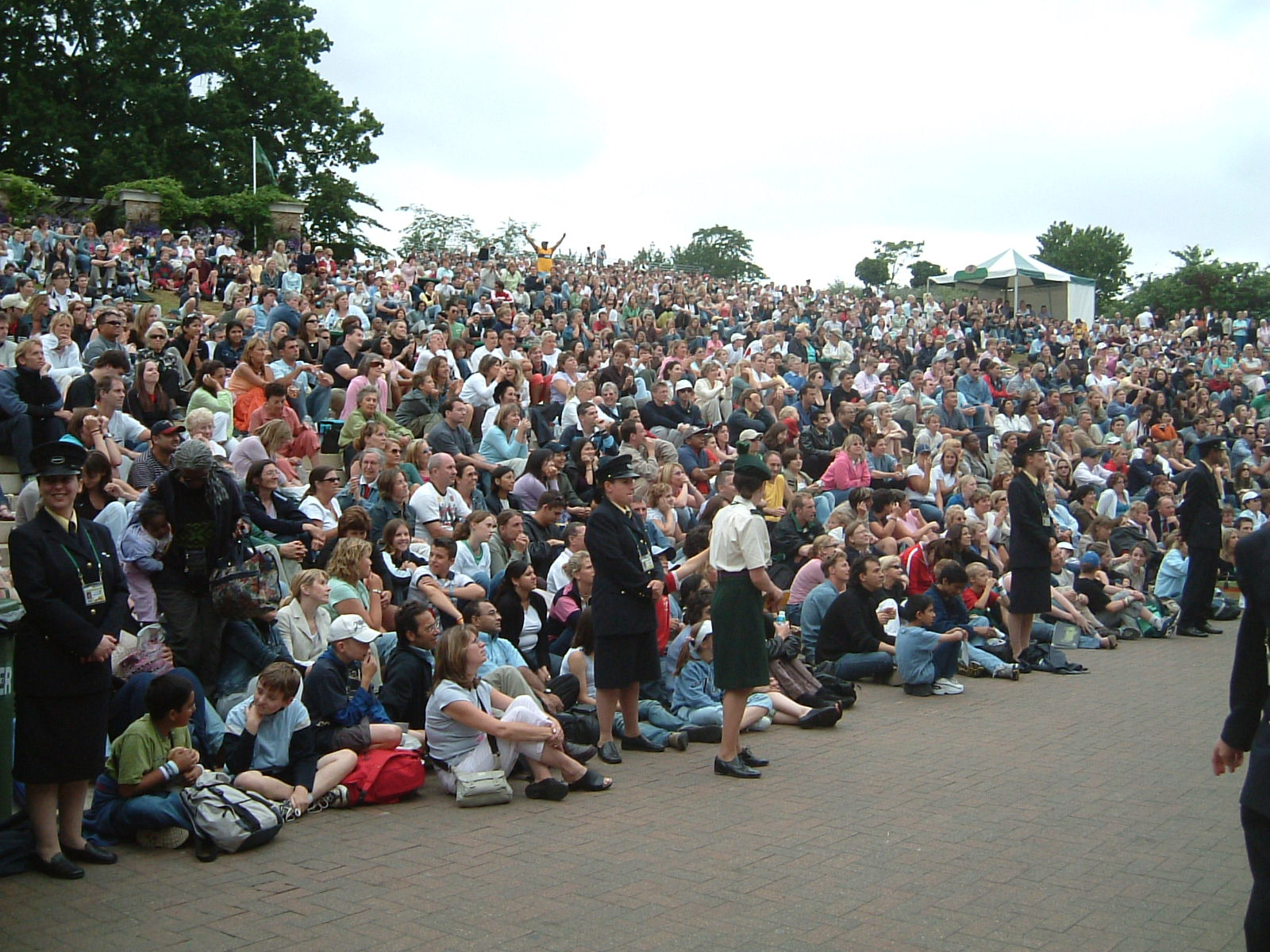
"Aorangi Terrace", front view

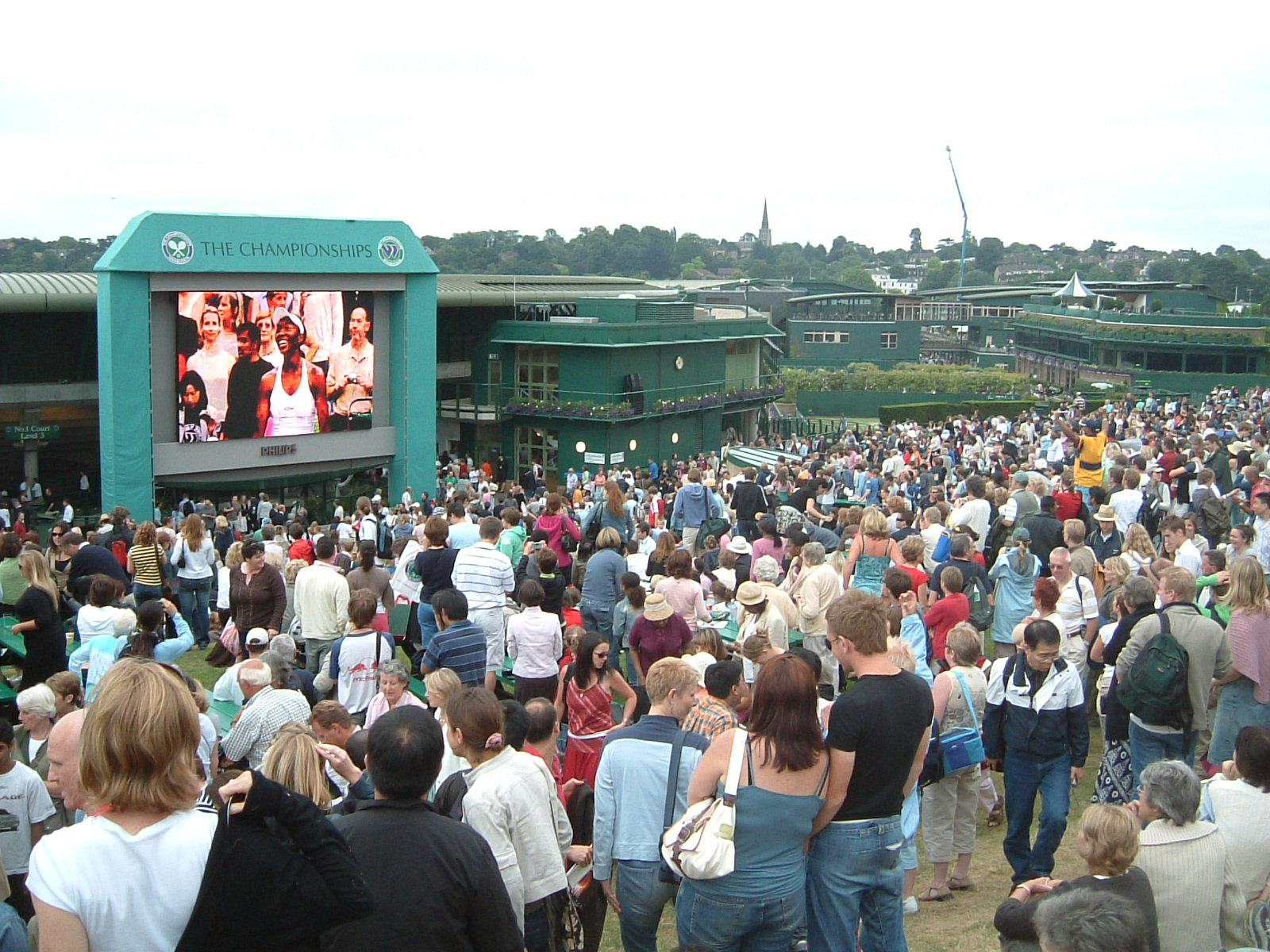
"Aorangi Terrace", rear view

Aorangi Terrace, commonly known as "Henman Hill", alongside a series of other nicknames, is a mostly grassed banked area in the grounds of the All England Lawn Tennis and Croquet Club where, during the annual Wimbledon tennis championships, crowds of people without show-court tickets can watch the tennis matches live on a giant television screen at the side of No. 1 Court.

During television broadcasts of matches, cameras often sweep over the area, and sports journalists frequently conduct vox pops and interviews with members of the crowd. The terrace is also the main site for spectators to eat picnics.

Aorangi Terrace's nickname of Henman Hill emerged in the late 1990s when British supporters would congregate to watch the matches of Tim Henman at the site. The hill is frequently given other alliterative nicknames relating to British players competing at Wimbledon (Rusedski Ridge, Murray Mound,' Heather Hill, Robson Green, Konta Contour, Raducanu Rise, Raducanu Ridge, Norrie Knoll, Arthur's Seat etc.) but Henman Hill has remained the most commonly used phrase.

== History ==
The terrace is named after Aorangi Park, the London New Zealand Rugby Club's grounds, which were on the site until 1981. Aorangi refers to the 'canonical' Māori description of Aoraki, the highest mountain in New Zealand, also known as Mount Cook. A new big screen was installed on the site following the construction of the new No. 1 Court in 1997. This coincided with the popularity of British player Tim Henman, and the site soon gained the nickname "Henman Hill", becoming a focal point for so-called Henmania. There is a "Henmans Hill" in Clifton, Bristol, England and anecdotally a supporter attending Wimbledon at the time was from that area and gave the hill that name, it being very similar to "Henman". British tennis followers would fanatically support four-time Wimbledon semi-finalist Henman as he played often dramatic matches in his many attempts to win the title.

Since Henman's retirement in 2007, the area has been colloquially named after other British tennis players. Most frequently, the site has been associated with Andy Murray, with names such as Murray Mound, Mount Murray, Murray Mountain and Murrayfield (in reference to the stadium in Edinburgh of the same name) all used.

As of 2021, the name "Henman Hill" is still used by the BBC and other media in reference to the area. In 2009, Tim Henman stated on Friday Night with Jonathan Ross that he had agreed with Andy Murray it is still "Henman Hill". Henman joked that "[Murray] can have all those grand slams he's going to win but I'm keeping my hill."

Tennis pundits and tabloids have occasionally referred to the hill according to the names of a series of other British players who have participated at Wimbledon. During Greg Rusedski's matches, the area was sometimes called Rusedski Ridge; Robson Ridge or Robson Green have been used in reference to Laura Robson; plus Heather Hill and Konta Kop in reference to Heather Watson and Johanna Konta.

The success of Emma Raducanu in the 2021 US Open led to speculation over the name Raducanu Ridge being used at Wimbledon 2022, in line with Rusedski Ridge and Robson Ridge. Other potential names for the site were suggested by the BBC, with Raducanu Rise coming out as the public's favourite.

For the 2022 Wimbledon tournament, Henman Hill was re-created by the AELTC in New York City, from 8 to 10 July. Dubbed the "Hill in New York", it was set up in Brooklyn Bridge Park at Pier 6, which also offered panoramic views of Lower Manhattan. Tickets were available on a walk-in basis up to a limit of 1,000 people per day.

During the 2026 Championships, the successful run of British wildcard Arthur Fery led to suggestions from fans that it be renamed Arthur's Seat.
