= Royal Box, Centre Court =

Tennis court seating area in Wimbledon, London

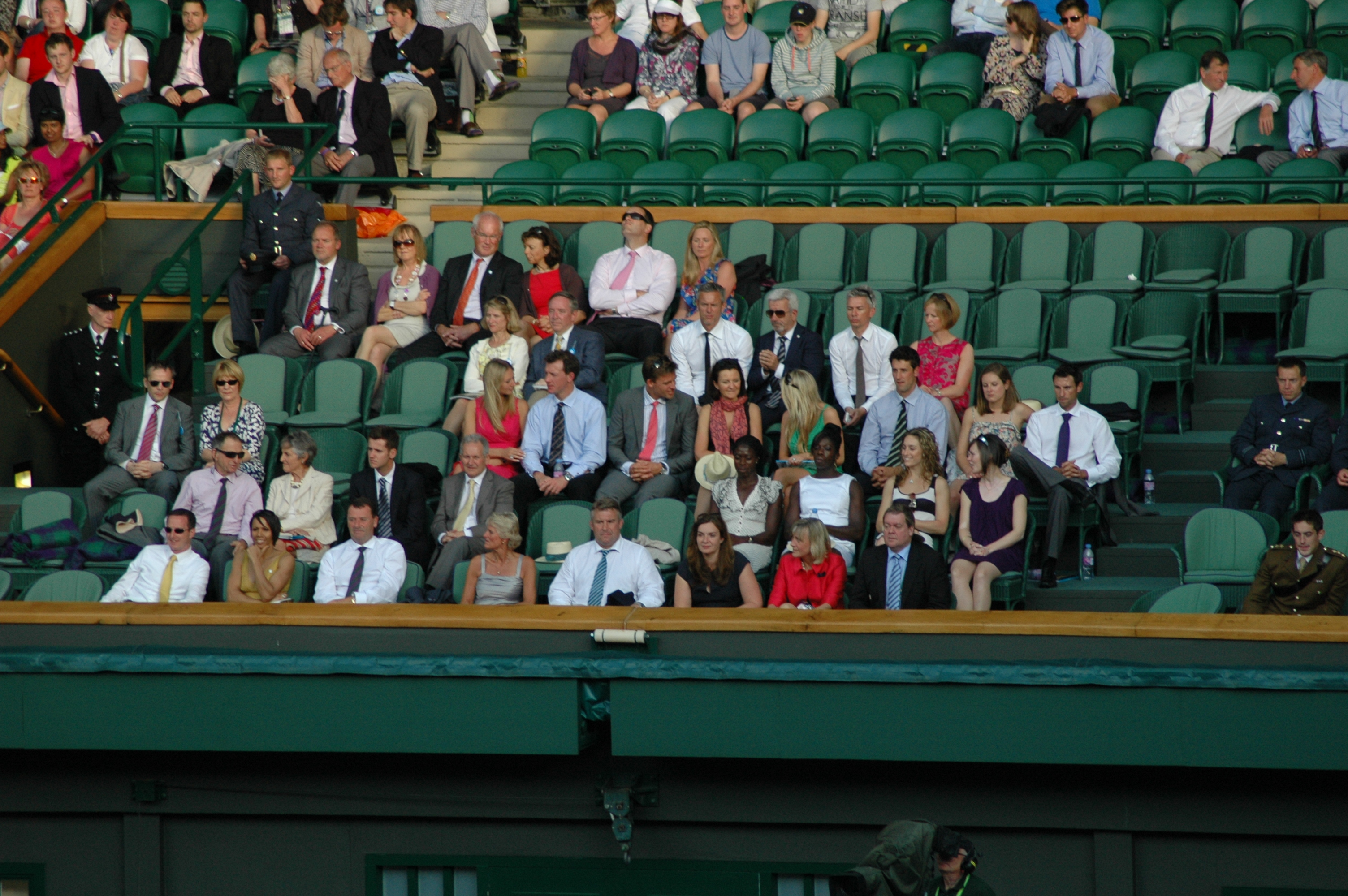
The Royal Box at Centre Court, Wimbledon

The Royal Box is a seating area of the Centre Court tennis court at the All England Lawn Tennis and Croquet Club in Wimbledon, London. The box has historically been associated with the British royal family. Guests are invited by the All England Club to sit in the box during the Wimbledon Championships, the third annual Grand Slam event.

The box is located on the south side of the Centre Court tennis court at the All England Lawn Tennis and Croquet Club in Wimbledon, London. The box has been present at Centre Court since it was built in 1922 when the All England Club moved to their new 13 acre ground on Wimbledon Park Road. The box was rebuilt in 2002. Prior to 1922 the Committee Box of the All England Club's former home at Worple Road was used when royalty were in attendance. The Royal Box had 74 seats in 2019.

The Wimbledon Compendium describes the guests of the Royal Box as people from "the tennis world, including supporters of British tennis, individuals of distinction and others who in various ways contribute to the betterment of our lives and society" with Wimbledon's official website describing the guests as "British and overseas Royal Families ... heads of government, people from the world of tennis, commercial partners, British armed forces, prominent media organisations, ... and other walks of life". The box was rebuilt in 2002. Guests are invited by the Chair of the Club and the Committee of Management. The guests sit on green Lloyd Loom chairs in the Royal Box. 250 steel tumblers were ordered for the Royal Box for the 2019 championships, but a significant number were stolen by guests and additional tumblers had to be ordered by the club. The 'goody bag' for the 2019 championships included "branded toiletries, Wimbledon chocolates, mints and a fan". An open free bar is available to guests in the royal box, with an early lunch starting at 11:30 am before the first play at 1pm.

The dress code required for the Royal Box is smart with a "lounge suit/blazer and tie for gentlemen and afternoon dress or elegant trouser suit for ladies". Women are asked not to wear hats, as they could obscure the views of people seated behind them. In 2015, Lewis Hamilton was refused entry to the box after falling afoul of the dress code having arrived wearing a "tie-less floral print shirt, chinos and a fedora". He refused the offer of a tie and blazer jacket and left 20 minutes after he had arrived.

== Notable guests ==
In 2003, the President of the International Olympic Committee, Jacques Rogge, was invited to the royal box for the men's final as part of their successful bid to host the 2012 Summer Olympics. In 2011 Diana Ross watched Serena Williams defeat Aravane Rezai from the box. In 2013 Gerard Butler and Bradley Cooper memorably sat next to each other wearing blue blazers. In 2014 guests included Andrew Mountbatten-Windsor who attended with Johan Eliasch, Bradley Cooper, Bear Grylls, Jude Law, Suki Waterhouse and Anna Wintour. In 2015 David Beckham caught a tennis ball with one hand that had been hit toward the box during play. The former Air Transport Auxiliary pilot Joy Lofthouse was invited in 2016. The two Royal Box tickets for the Speaker of the House of Commons, John Bercow, were declared to be worth £8,590 in the Register of Members' Interests in 2017. The tennis player Roger Becker and his wife were invited to the box in 2008 to celebrate their 50th wedding anniversary.

== British royal family ==
The royal box at the Wimbledon Championships was created when King George V attended the 1907 championships at the old ground at Worple Road. In 1922 King George appeared in the new Centre Court at Wimbledon Park Road and rang a gong three times to declare the club's grounds open. Rain had necessitated a delay of 45 minutes to the ceremony.

Queen Mary arrived in the Royal Box to take her seat during the second set of the 1935 men's semi-final match between Don Budge and Gottfried von Cramm. Cramm immediately stopped playing, though a volley was in progress, and clicked his heels to salute the Queen. The 18,000 spectators also stood to attention. After exchanging ends, Cramm spoke to Budge, and Budge then waved at the Queen in greeting, which was seen as a severe breach of etiquette. The Queen waved back, and the crowd burst into shouts of 'God save the Queen'.

Queen Elizabeth II attended in 1957 for the first time to present Althea Gibson with the trophy for winning the women's singles.

In 1999, the Duchess of Kent was told in a letter by the chairman of the All England Club, John Curry not to bring children to sit with her in the royal box, and that she could invite only one guest per day to sit with her. The Times described the duchess as "understood to be bewildered and hurt" by that requirement and surmised that she might decline to sit in the royal box in future. The Duchess had been previously refused permission to sit there with the 12-year-old son of a bereaved friend. She was allowed to take her godson the following day but not the 12-year-old. The Duchess also believed the atmosphere at Wimbledon to be too formal and discouraging to young people.

Until 2003, players were expected to bow or curtsy to members of the royal family seated in the Royal Box upon entering or leaving Centre Court. However, All England Club president Prince Edward, Duke of Kent decided to discontinue the tradition. Now, players are only required to bow or curtsy if the Prince of Wales or the monarch is present, as was in practice during the 2010 Championships when Elizabeth II was in attendance at Wimbledon on 24 June. In June 2012 Roger Federer said in a post-match interview that he and his opponent had been asked to bow towards the Royal Box as Prince Charles and his wife, Duchess of Cornwall were present, saying that it was not a problem for him.

In 2018, the Duchess of Cambridge and the Duchess of Sussex carried out their first public engagement without their husbands when they attended the royal box to watch the Women's singles final.
