= Statue of Fred Perry =

Sculpture in London

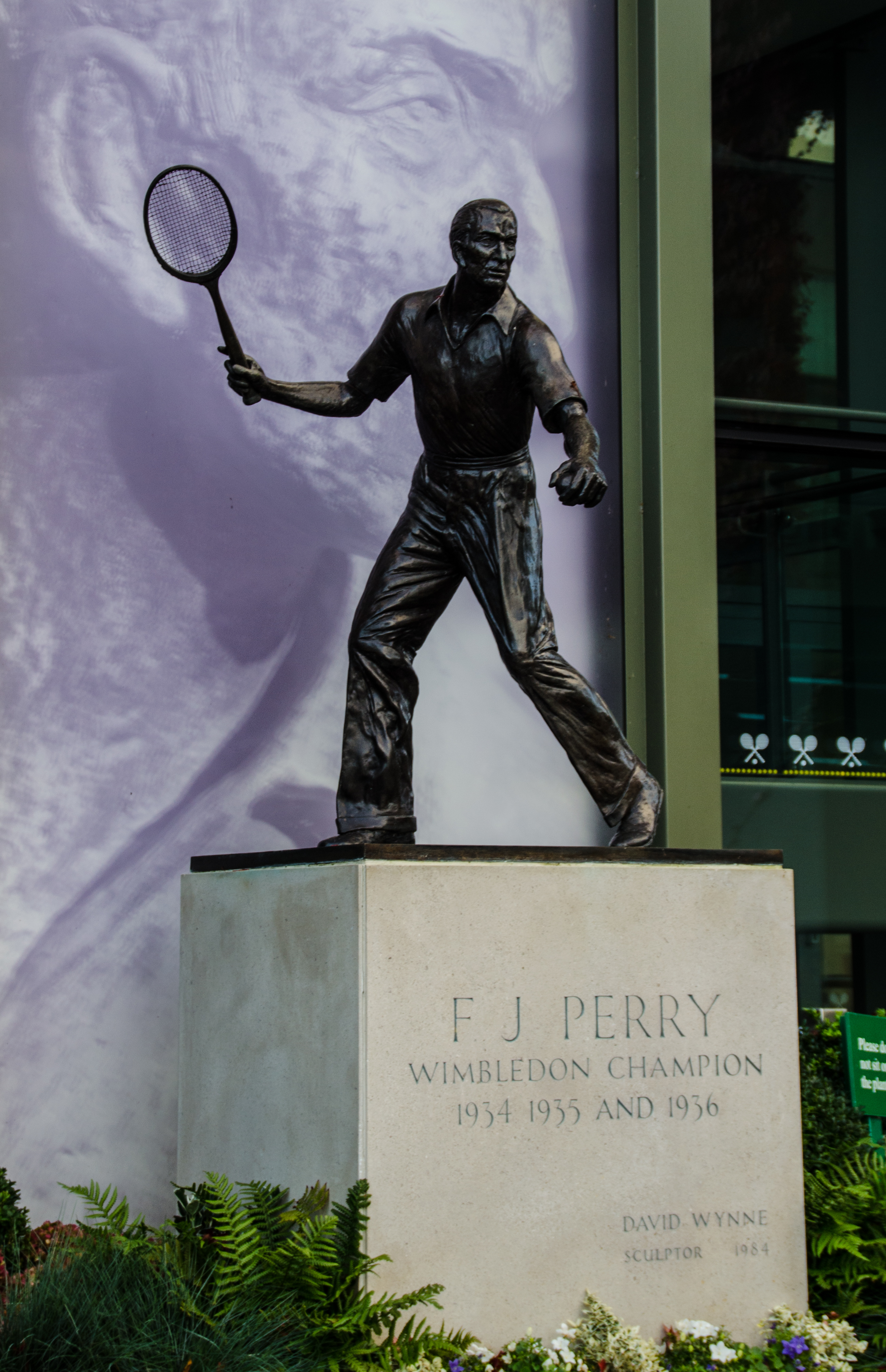
- The statue in 2014
- Artist: David Wynne
- Year: 1984
- Completion date: 20 May 1984
- Type: Sculpture
- Medium: Bronze
- Subject: Fred Perry
- Location: Wimbledon, London, SW19; 51.434382°N 0.213491°W
- Owner: All England Lawn Tennis and Croquet Club

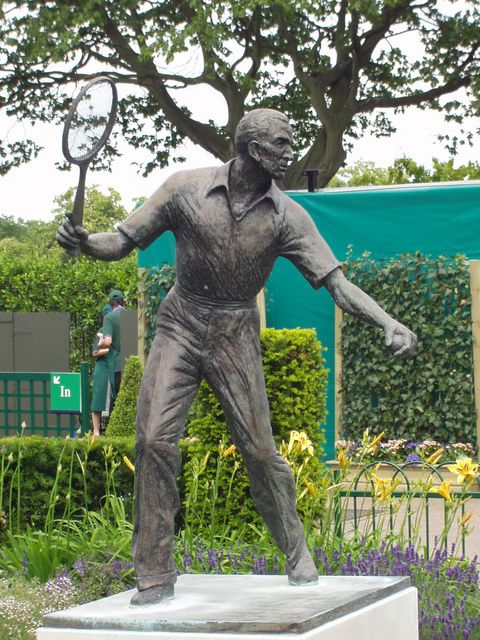
Close up of the statue in 2004

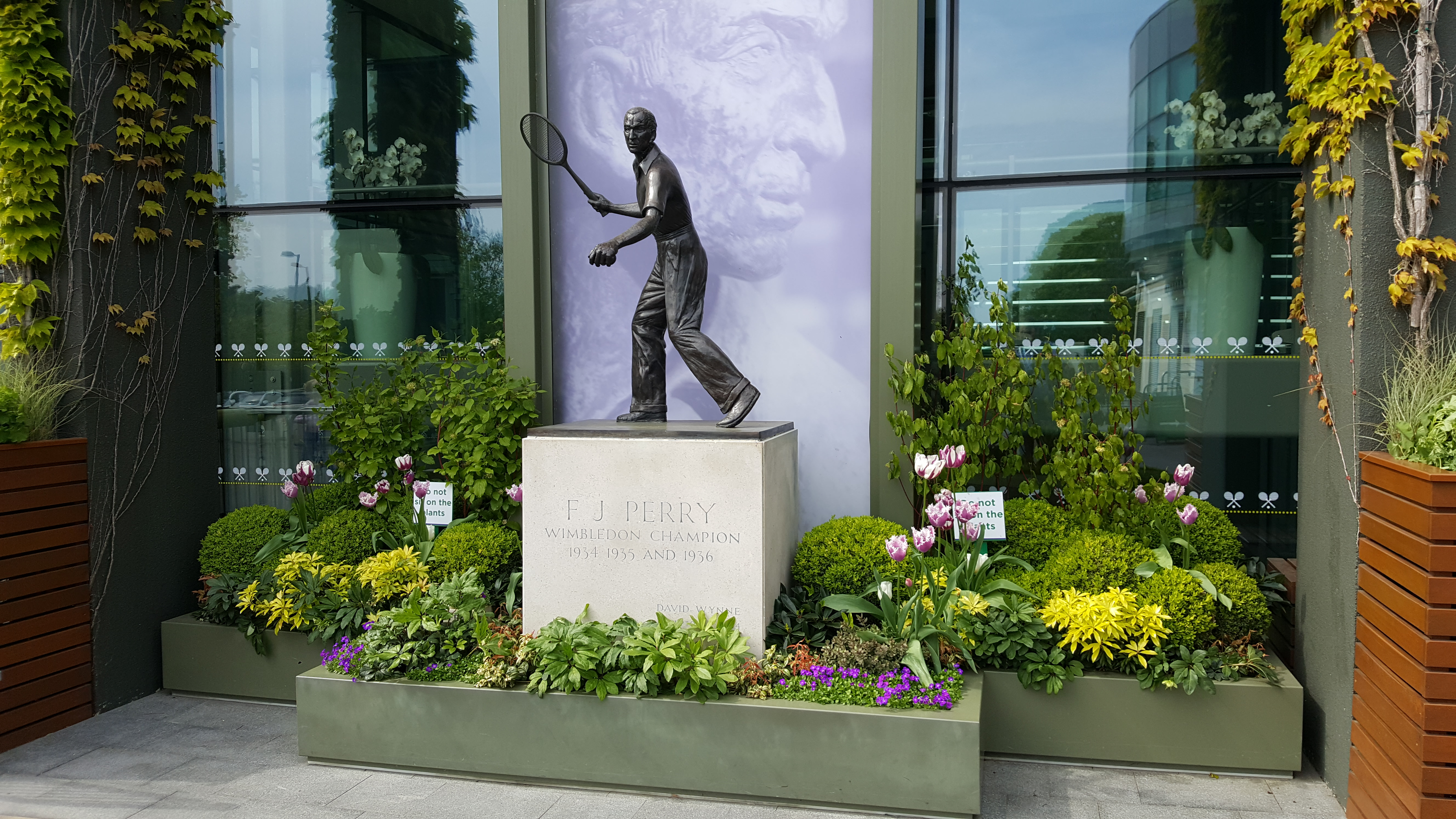
The statue in 2017

A statue of Fred Perry stands in the grounds of the All England Lawn Tennis and Croquet Club in Wimbledon in south-west London. It was sculpted by David Wynne.

== Location and description ==
It stands in the grounds of the All England Lawn Tennis and Croquet Club in Wimbledon. It was sculpted by David Wynne. It is a one-third life-size study showing Perry playing a forehand shot. He is holding a wooden racket and wearing trousers. The front of the plinth is inscribed

F J PERRY/WIMBLEDON CHAMPION 1934, 1935 AND 1936/DAVID WYNNE/SCULPTOR 1984

. The obverse is inscribed

UNVEILED BY H.R.H. THE DUKE OF KENT G.C.M.G. G.C.V.O. A.D.C. PRESIDENT AELTC 20TH MAY 1984

From 1984 to 2010 the statue was situated near Gate 5 of the grounds of the club. It is now near Gate 4.

== History ==
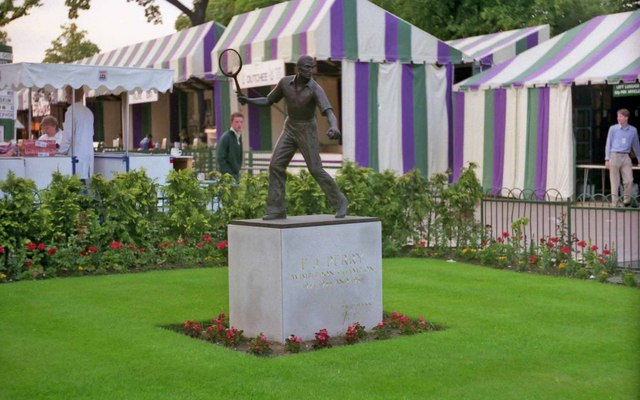
The statue in 1987 prior to its resiting

The statue was erected in 1984 to commemorate the 50th anniversary of Perry's first Men's singles title at Wimbledon in 1934. It was unveiled by the Duke and Duchess of Kent on 20 May 1984. The statue was erected on 20 May 1984 during the chairmanship of Buzzer Hadingham. Perry complained that his name was not especially visible, so it was altered.

Wynn's maquette for the sculpture is one of 140 maquettes given on long-term loan to Stowe House by Wynne in 2007.

Perry's perception of the statue was analysed by Richard Brilliant in his 2013 book Portraiture. Brilliant discusses how Perry, upon seeing the statue declared "Oh my god ... It's me. It was scary" despite the sculpture being based on one of 700 photographs of Perry taken many decades ago and not Perry as he was at the time of its creation. Perry would occasionally point to the statue to identify himself to the guards at the gates of Wimbledon if he arrived without a pass. On a trip to Russia late in life, Perry was once shown a spy satellite photo of the Wimbledon grounds by a former KGB member who pointed out the statue to him.
