= All England Lawn Tennis and Croquet Club =

Private members' club in Wimbledon, England

Coordinates: 51°26′03″N 0°12′52″W

The All England Lawn Tennis and Croquet Club
- Nickname: All England Club
- Established: 23 July 1868; 158 years ago
- Legal status: Private company limited by guarantee
- Headquarters: Church Road, Wimbledon, London, SW19 5AE
- Members: 565 (2017)
- Patron: The Princess of Wales
- Chief Executive: Richard Atkinson (interim)
- Chair of the Board: Debbie Jevans
- Board of directors: James Acheson-Gray, Sally Ambrose, Richard Baker, Gus O'Donnell, Kevin Havelock, Tim Henman, Debbie Jevans, Simon Jones, Anne Keothavong, Richard Stoakes, Ashley Tatum, Henry Weatherill
- Formerly called: The All England Croquet Club; The All England Croquet and Lawn Tennis Club

The All England Lawn Tennis and Croquet Club (AELTC), also known as the All England Club, is a private members' club based at Church Road in the Wimbledon area of London, England. It is best known as the venue for the Wimbledon Championships, the only Grand Slam tennis event still held on grass. It has been played every year since 1877 from late June to mid-July with the exceptions of World War I (1915–1918), World War II (1940–1945) and the COVID-19 pandemic (2020). Initially an amateur event that occupied club members and their friends for a few days each summer, the championships have become far more prominent than the club itself.

The club has 375 full members, about 100 temporary playing members, and a number of honorary members. To become a full or temporary member, an applicant must obtain letters of support from four existing full members, two of whom must have known the applicant for at least three years. The name is then added to the candidates' list. Honorary members are elected from time to time by the club's committee. Membership carries with it the right to purchase two tickets for each day of the Wimbledon Championships. In addition to this, all champions are invited to become members.

Catherine, Princess of Wales, has been the patron of the club since 2016, and took over in 2021 from Prince Edward, Duke of Kent when he stepped down as president of the club, among a number of royal patronages.

== History ==
The club was founded by six gentlemen (Note: The gentlemen were John H. Walsh, Captain R. F. Dalton, John Hinde Hale, the Rev. A. Law, S. H. Clarke Maddock, and Walter Jones Whitmore. Walsh, the magazine's editor, was the chairman of the meeting. Whitmore and Maddock were appointed honorary secretary and treasurer respectively.) at the offices of The Field on 23 July 1868 at the height of a croquet craze as the All England Croquet Club, and held its first croquet competition in 1870. Its original ground was situated off Worple Road, Wimbledon. Croquet was very popular there until the then-infant sport of lawn tennis (a game introduced by Major Walter Clopton Wingfield a year or so prior, and originally called Sphairistikè) was introduced in 1875, when one lawn was set aside for this purpose.

The first tennis gentlemen's championship in singles was held in July 1877, when the club changed its name to The All England Croquet and Lawn Tennis Club. That year at Wimbledon service was underarm. The champion, Spencer Gore, opined that "Lawn tennis will never rank among our great games." In 1878 the height of the net was altered to 4 feet 9 inches (1.45 m) at the posts and 3 feet (0.91 m) at the centre. In 1882, croquet was dropped from the name, as tennis had become the main activity of the club. But in 1899 it was restored to the club's name for sentimental reasons, and the club's name became The All England Lawn Tennis and Croquet Club.

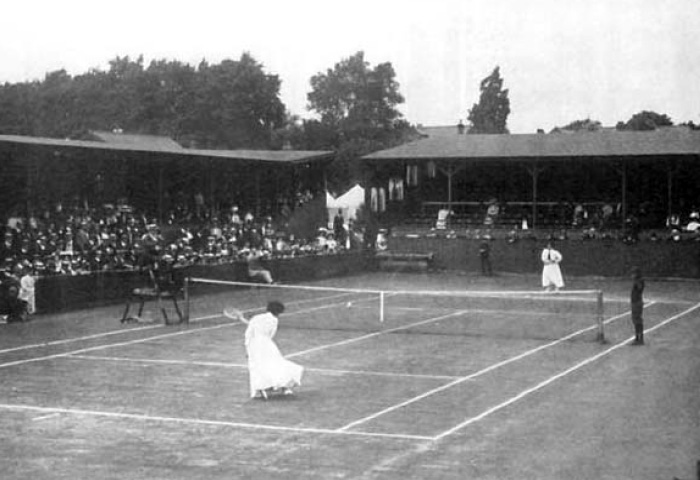
Finals of the Ladies' lawn tennis singles tournament at the 1908 Olympics, at the club

In 1884, the club added Ladies' Singles and Gentlemen's Doubles, and then in 1913 Ladies' Doubles and Mixed Doubles. For the 1908 Summer Olympics, the venue hosted the Grass Courts tennis events. The early club colours were found to be almost identical to those of the Royal Marines, so they were changed in 1909 to the present club colours of dark green and purple. The popularity of Frenchwoman Suzanne Lenglen was largely responsible for forcing the club to move to larger grounds at its present site in Church Road, Wimbledon, in 1922, where its first championship was "plagued by rain each day".

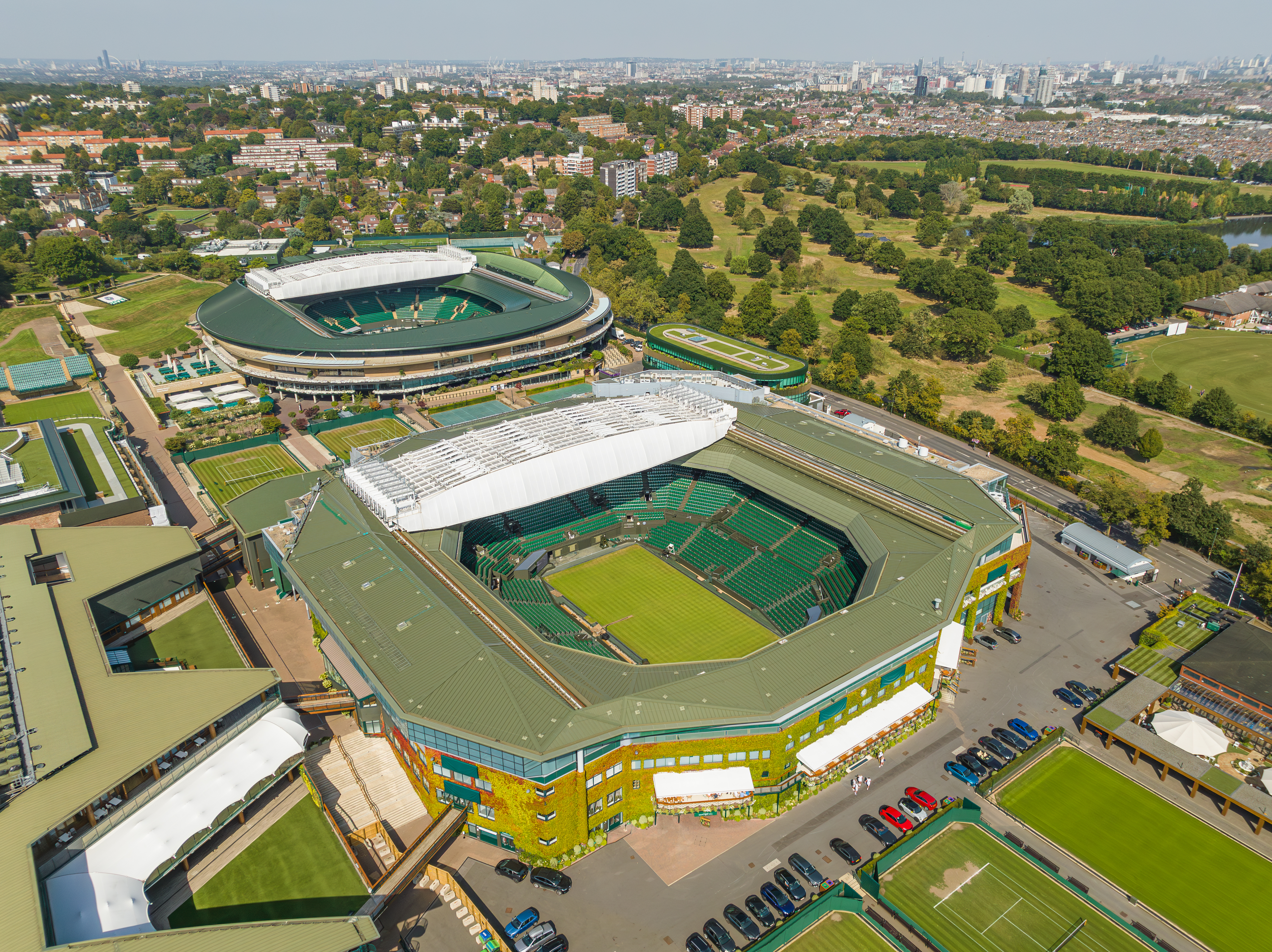
Centre Court and No.1 Court in the background

The current Centre Court dates from that year. It has been improved and extended on several occasions. Most recently a sliding roof was added in time for the 2009 Championships. In 1924 the old No.1 Court opened on the west side of Centre Court. During World War II The Championships were suspended but the club remained open with a much smaller staff, and was used for fire and ambulance services, British Home Guard, and a decontamination unit, and troops stationed nearby drilled on the main concourse. At 5:20 p.m. on 11 October 1940, five 50-pound German bombs struck the grounds, demolishing 1,200 seats in Centre Court. The old No.1 Court was replaced with the current No.1 Court in 1997, and the Broadcast Centre was built at the same time. Shortly afterwards, the Millennium Building, which houses facilities for players, press, officials and members, was built on the site of the old No.1 Court.

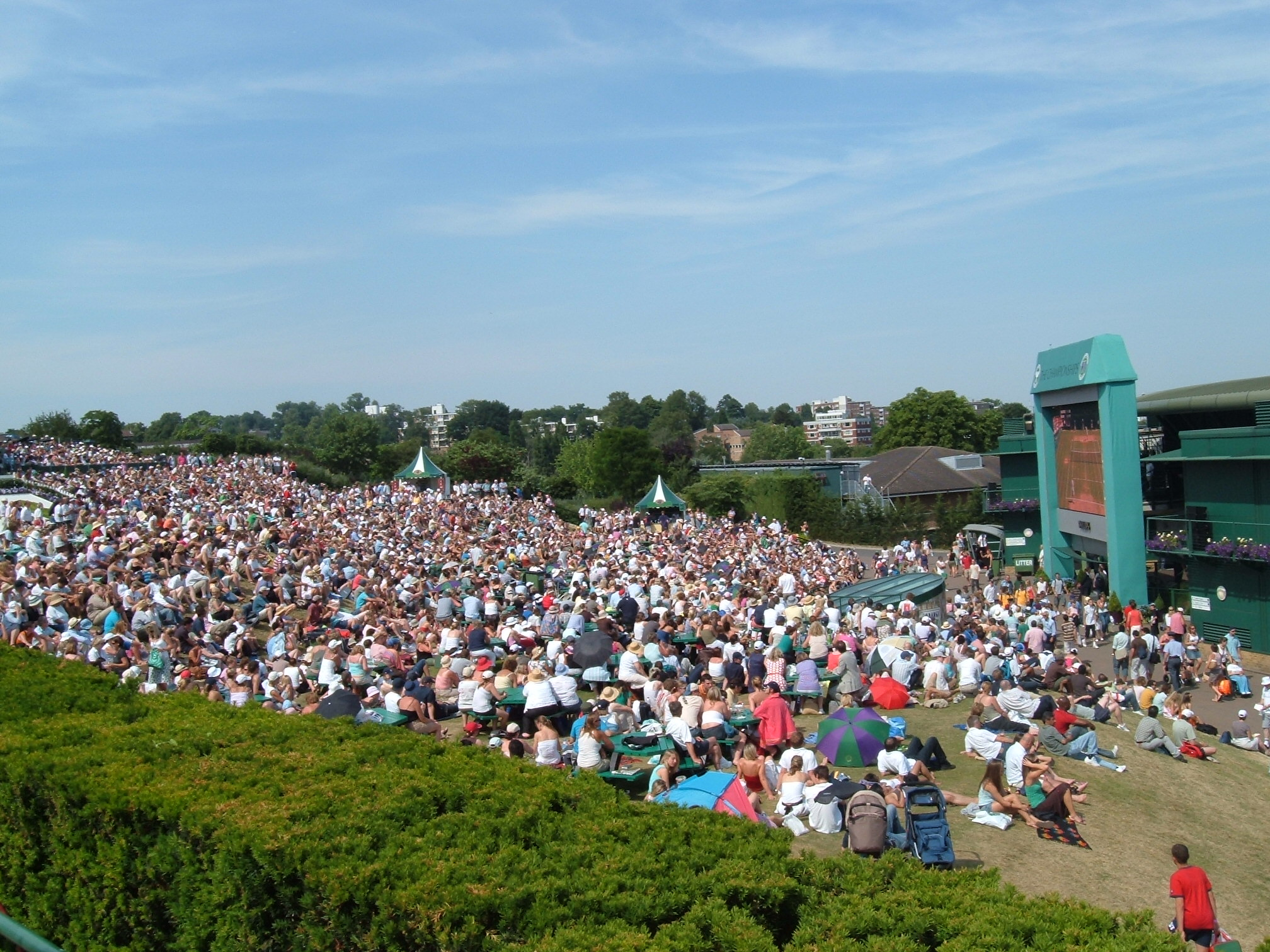
People sitting on Aorangi terrace, better known as Henman Hill, watching main matches on the large screen

The Church Road site initially extended only as far north as Centre Court. In 1967 the All England Club purchased 11 acres (4.5 ha) to the north. This was leased to the New Zealand Sports and Social Club and became known as Aorangi Park (Aorangi means "Cloud Piercer", and is the Māori part of Aoraki / Mount Cook; "Aorangi" is the standard Māori spelling and "Aoraki" is used in the Māori dialect in the vicinity of the mountain). It is most commonly known as "Henman Hill" because of the popularity of former British tennis player Tim Henman. Initially the only use that the All England Club itself made of this new land was for car parking during The Championships, but in 1981 the New Zealanders' lease was terminated, and the club has developed most of the area for its own purposes.

A statue of Fred Perry by David Wynne was unveiled at the club in 1984 by Prince Edward, Duke of Kent on the 50th anniversary of Perry's first victory in the men's singles championship. The gates to the Somerset Road entrance of the grounds were also named the Fred Perry Gates. In 2004 five busts of the British women's singles champions were unveiled outside Centre Court. They were sculpted by Ian Rank-Broadley in bronze. Alchemilla, a water sculpture by William Pye, was unveiled by the Duke of Kent on the first day of the 2016 championships. A statue of Andy Murray is planned for 2027 to mark the 150th anniversary of the championships.

The All England Club, through its subsidiary The All England Lawn Tennis Ground plc, issues debentures to tennis fans every five years to raise funds for capital expenditure. The original debentures were issued in 1920. Each debenture provides a pair of tickets for each day of the tournament for five years. Only debenture holders are legally permitted to on-sell their tickets to third parties.

In 2011, the club established another subsidiary, The All England Lawn Tennis Club (Championships) Limited, trading as AELTC, and transferred all of its assets relating to The Championships to that entity on 1 August of that year. Since that time, the club's activities have been conducted separately from those of The Championships.

The club was the venue for the tennis event at the 2012 Summer Olympics.

In June 2020, Wimbledon was cancelled for the first time since World War II due to the COVID-19 pandemic. Wimbledon was cancelled several times during the wars: in World War I between 1915 and 1918 and World War II between 1940 and 1945.

In July 2023, Debbie Jevans became the first chairwoman of the board, succeeding Ian Hewitt at the end of the 2023 Wimbledon Championships.

=== 1913 suffragette attack ===
A failed attempt was made to destroy the grounds in 1913, as part of the suffragette bombing and arson campaign. During the years before the First World War, suffragettes, as part of their campaign for women's votes, carried out politically motivated arson and bombings across the country. On 27 February 1913, a suffragette woman "between the ages of 30–35" was arrested within the grounds, after being spotted by a groundsman climbing over a hedge at around midnight. She was found to have on her paraffin and wood shavings, for the purpose of setting fires in the grounds. The woman refused to give her name or any information and was later sentenced to two months' imprisonment.

== Facilities ==
Audio description of the club by Lady Cobham

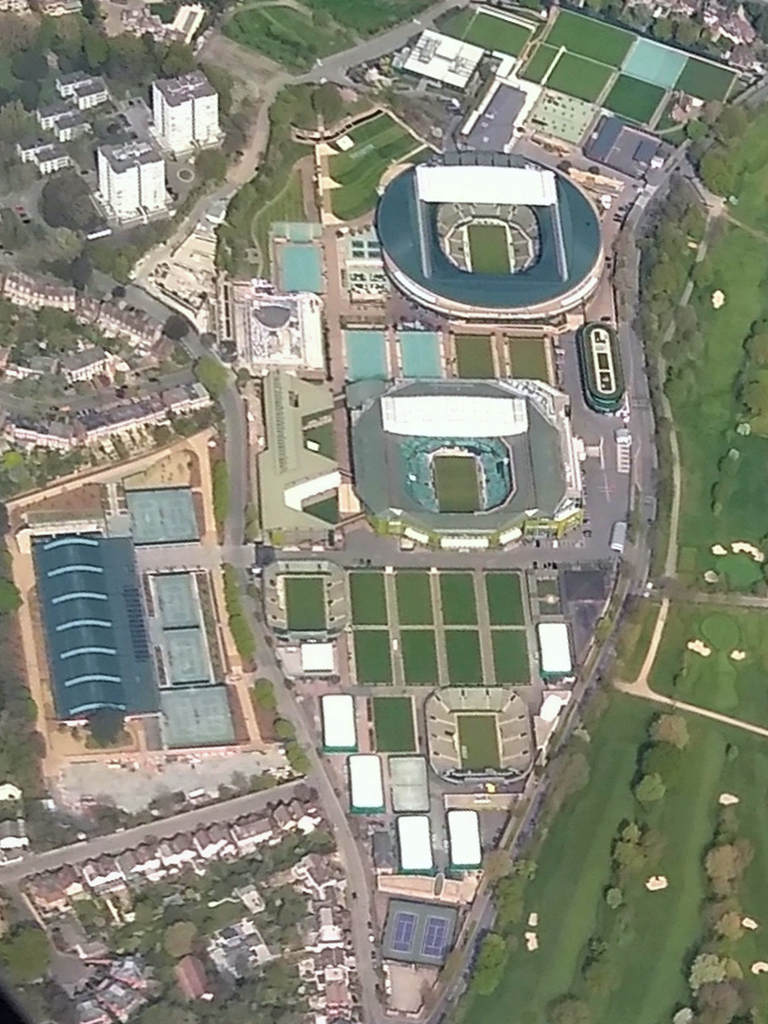
Aerial view of the grounds in 2022

The club currently has 18 tournament grass courts, eight American clay courts, two acrylic courts, and six indoor courts. There are also 22 grass courts at the nearby Aorangi Park, which serve as competitors' practice courts before and during The Championships. The grass courts can be used from May until September. The grass has been cut to 8 mm since 1995, and 100% perennial ryegrass has been used for its strength since 2001 (prior to that, it was 70% perennial rye and 30% creeping red fescue). The courts are renovated in September, using nine tons of grass seed annually.

The largest court is Centre Court, which hosts the finals of the main singles and doubles events at The Championships. There is an inscription above the entryway to Centre Court which reads "If you can meet with triumph and disaster / And treat those two impostors just the same" – lines from Rudyard Kipling's poem If—. This court also served as the main venue for the tennis events at the 2012 Summer Olympics. Initially, the courts were arranged in such a way that the principal court was situated in the middle with the others arranged around it; hence the title "Centre Court".

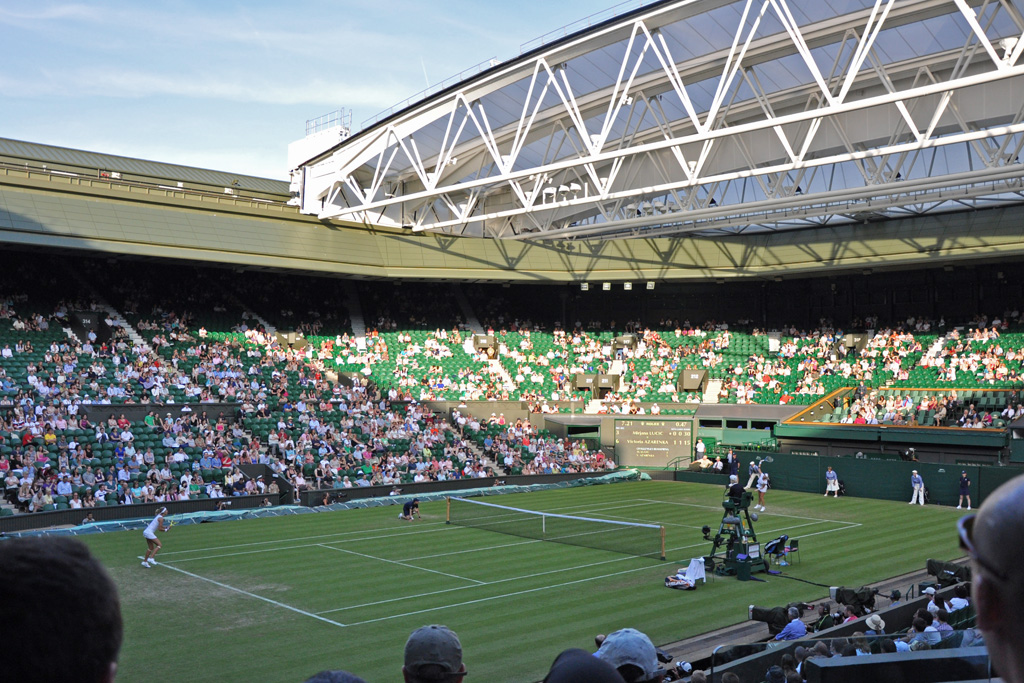
Centre Court with its retractable folding concertina roof

The present Centre Court, built in 1922 upon the move of the club, was not actually in the centre at the time it was built, but as new courts were added in later years it became a more accurate description. It currently seats 15,000 – expanded from 14,000 following redevelopment in 2007–08 (spatially, the expansion is greater than those numbers imply, as seats have been widened), and (as of 2009) is the fourth-largest tennis stadium in the world. The Club installed a retractable roof on Centre Court which was completed in May 2009. It is a "folding concertina" made of 5,200 square metres of a translucent waterproof fabric that allows natural light to reach the grass, and opens or closes in under 10 minutes. Redevelopment work commenced in 2006, and Centre Court had no roof at all in place for the duration of the 2007 Championships.

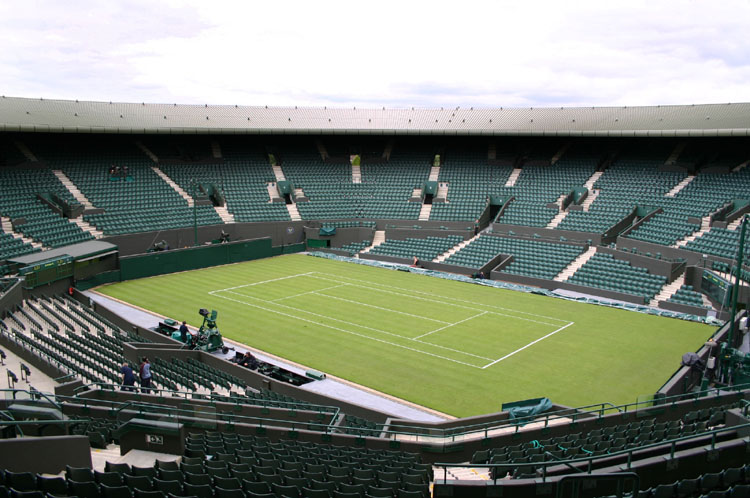
No. 1 Court (before the retractable roof was installed in 2019)

The other "show court" is No.1 Court, built in 1997, which holds around 11,500 people and occasionally plays host to Davis Cup matches (Centre Court usually being reserved for the Wimbledon Championships). It has been fitted with a retractable roof similar to Centre Court and was unveiled at a special ceremony on 19 May 2019.

A new No.2 Court with 4,000 seats was first used at the 2009 Championships. The old No.2 Court was renamed No.3 Court in 2009, and was rebuilt after the 2009 Championships. The grounds underwent major renovation as part of the Wimbledon Master Plan.

In December 2018 the club agreed a £65 million compensation package with the members of the adjacent Wimbledon Park Golf Club to cut short their lease on the ground in order to expand. In September 2024, planning permission was granted for the expansion plans which include 39 new tennis courts. This permission was then subject to a judicial review, with a final judgement expected in July 2025.

The club also houses the Wimbledon Lawn Tennis Museum.

== The Championships ==
Among the features that differentiate The Wimbledon Championships from the other Grand Slams are that they are played on grass courts, they require the players to wear white, and until 2021, the middle Sunday was a day off (though sometimes – in 1991, 1997, 2004 and 2016 – poor weather meant play needed to take place). Balls were also white until 1986. The winner of the Gentlemen's singles at The Championships receives a gold trophy inscribed with the words: "The All England Lawn Tennis Club Single Handed Champion of the World".

The Championships attract attendance of around 450,000 people. Ninety per cent of the financial surplus that the Club generates from running The Championships is used to develop tennis in Great Britain; between 1998 and 2016 the surplus ranged from £25–40 million per year. The Championships are run by a Committee of Management that consists of 12 club members and seven nominees of The Lawn Tennis Association (LTA).

In 2003, a long-standing tradition of Centre Court players bowing or curtseying to the Royal Box was discontinued by order of the Duke of Kent, with the exception of the Queen or the Prince of Wales's attendance. Andy Murray and Jarkko Nieminen elected to bow when the Queen visited The Championships for their 2010 second round match, as did Roger Federer and Fabio Fognini at their second round match, watched by the Prince of Wales, in 2012. In December 2016, it was announced that the then Duchess of Cambridge would succeed the Queen as Patron of The AELTC and The Championships, effective January 2017.

In 2006, Chairman Tim Phillips said that paying men and women equal prize money at The Championships was something they "fundamentally don't think would be fair on the men" (due to men playing best-of-five sets, and women only best-of-three). The Championships introduced equal prize money the following year.

=== Alleged exclusions ===
Black players were not allowed to play at the club until 1951, and Jews were not admitted until 1952. According to Angela Buxton, the Jewish former British Wimbledon doubles champion, it also led to her exclusion. Buxton said in 2004, reflecting on the fact that the All England Club, almost 50 years after Buxton's 1956 Wimbledon triumph with Althea Gibson, had still not invited Buxton to join: "I think the anti-Semitism is still there. The mere fact that I'm not a member is a full sentence that speaks for itself." Buxton told New York Post reporter Marc Berman that she had been on the "waiting list" since she applied in the 1950s. "I wish it still wasn't such an elite sport," Buxton told Berman. "I wish we could bring it down to a common baseline. It's going that way. It's still not there." The club strongly disagreed with Buxton's portrayal, stating: "While the decision-making process for membership of the All England Club is a private matter, we strongly refute any suggestion that race or religion plays a factor."

== Arms ==
Coat of arms of All England Lawn Tennis and Croquet Club
Notes Granted 23 April 1993 by Colin Cole. Crest Two arms embowed vested Argent the hands Proper holding aloft a representation of the Gentlemen's Singles Wimbledon Championship Trophy Gold. Torse Argent and Vert Escutcheon Argent five pallets Vert over all on a pile issuing from the dexter chief throughout Purpure a roundel Or thereon a bendlet sinister nebuly of one undulation upwards Purpure . Supporters Two lions salient reguardant per fess Vert and Purpure semy of roundels Argent langued Purpure. Compartment The surface of a lawn tennis court. Badge On a roundel Vert two tennis rackets in saltire in base an annulet Argent.

== See also ==
- Wimbledon Championships
- The Wimbledon Effect
- Wimbledon Manor House
- Queen's Club – London's second most famous tennis club
- History of tennis
- Lawn Tennis Association
- Melbourne Park
- Roland Garros Stadium
- USTA Billie Jean King National Tennis Center
