= Centre Court =

Main court at Wimbledon

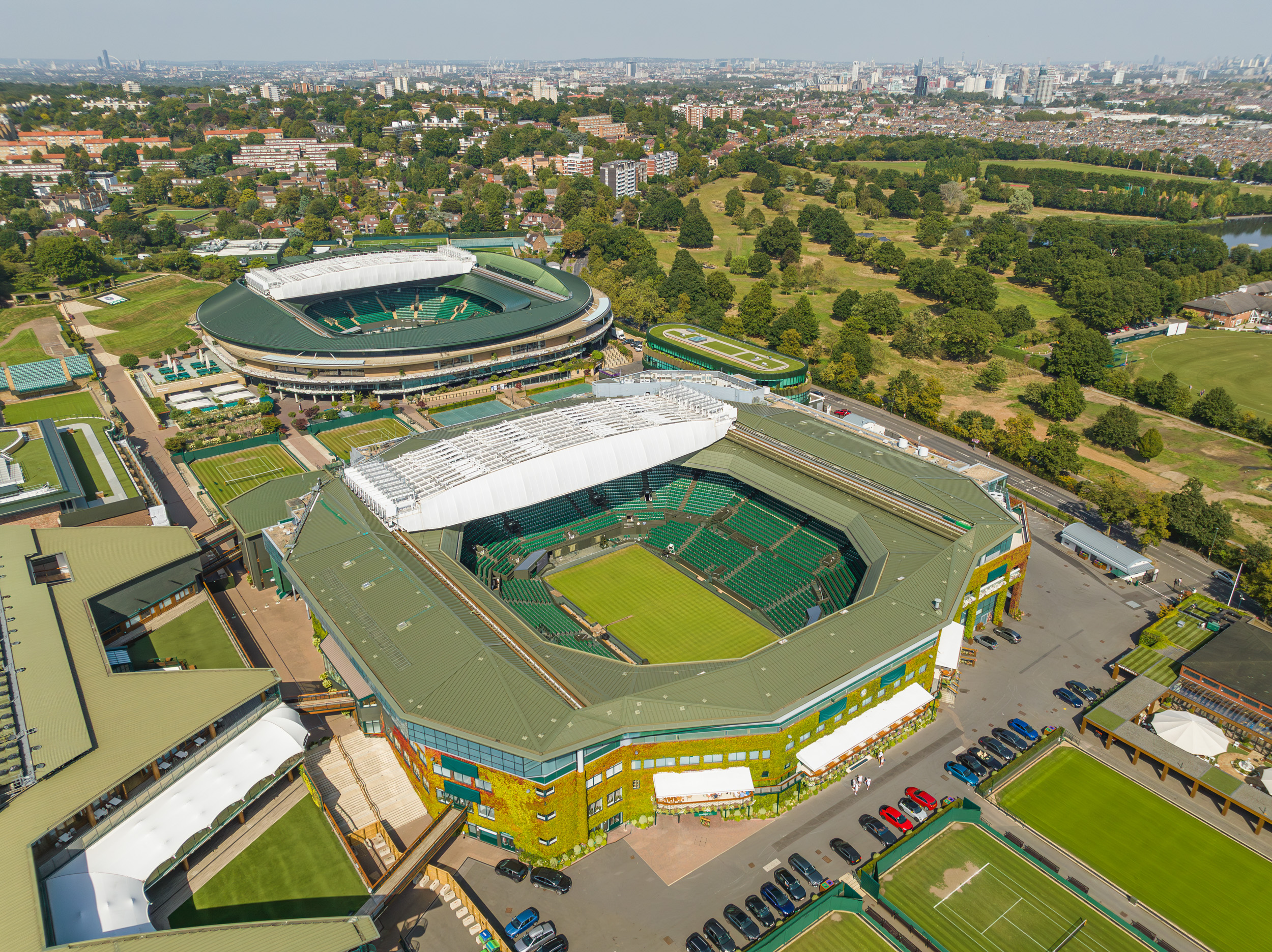
- Centre Court at Wimbledon, September 2023
- Interactive map of Centre Court
- Location: All England Lawn Tennis and Croquet Club; Wimbledon, London, SW19
- Coordinates: 51°26′1.48″N 0°12′50.63″W
- Owner: AELTC
- Capacity: 14,979 seats
- Roof: Retractable
- Surface: Grass
- Public transit: Southfields

Construction
- Opened: 1922
- Renovated: 2009
- Cost: £100 million (2009 renovation)
- Architect: Populous (formerly HOK Sport) (2009 renovation)

Tenants
- Wimbledon Championships; Summer Olympics (2012)

Centre Court is a tennis court at the All England Lawn Tennis and Croquet Club (also known as the All England Club) and is the main court used in the Wimbledon Championships, the third annual Grand Slam event of the tennis calendar. It is considered the world's most famous tennis court. It incorporates the clubhouse of the All England Club. Its only regular use for play is during the two weeks a year that the Championships take place. Centre Court has a premier box, known as the Royal Box, for use by the British royal family and other distinguished guests. It is the sixth largest tennis-specific stadium in the world by capacity.

A retractable roof was installed in 2009, enabling play to continue during rain and into the night up until a council-imposed curfew of 11:00 pm. Centre Court, along with No. 1 Court and No. 2 Court, was also host to the tennis competition at the 2012 Summer Olympics.

== History ==
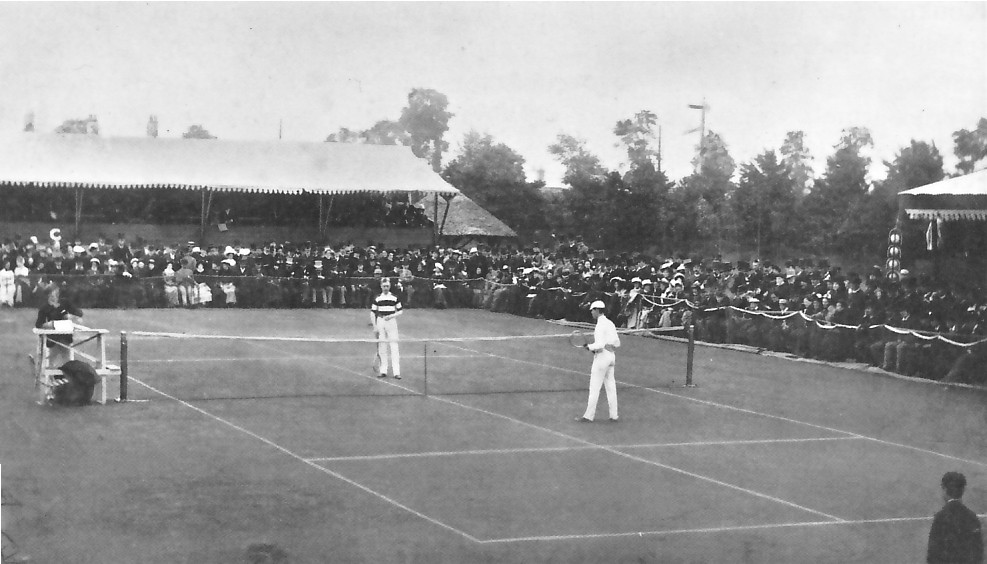
Centre Court in 1883, Challenge Round between William and Ernest Renshaw

The name "Centre Court" derives from the location of the principal court at the All England Croquet Club's original site off Worple Road, Wimbledon – where the main court was located in the centre of all the other courts. For the first Wimbledon Championship in 1877 a total of 12 courts were available which were laid out in a 3×4 grid and there was no actual centre court. This changed in 1881 when the middle two courts of the middle row were combined to form a Centre Court. The name was kept when the club relocated to its present site at Church Road in 1922. It was not until a further four courts were added in 1980 that Centre Court's location in the grounds again matched its name.

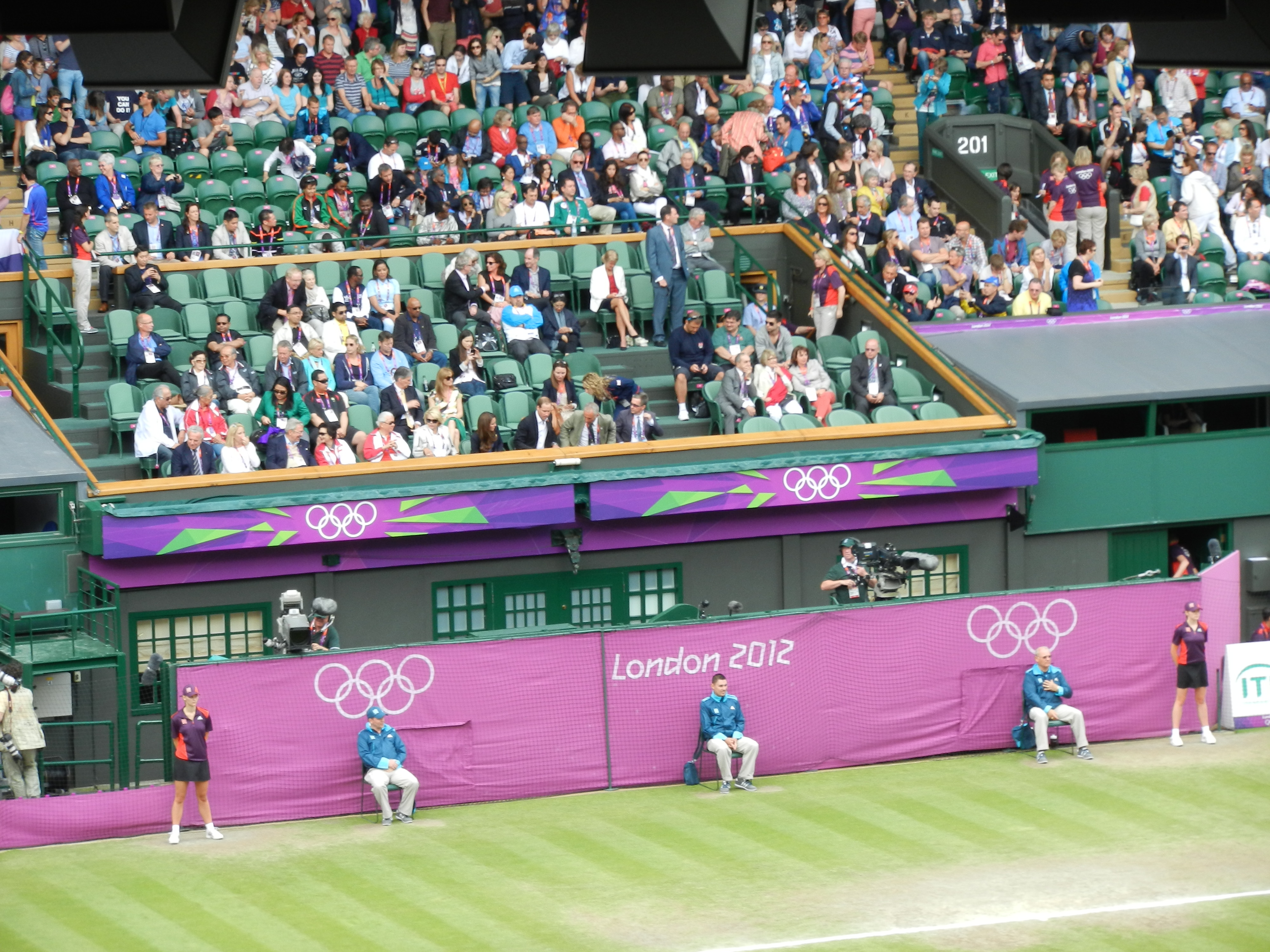
The Centre Court royal box during the London 2012 Summer Olympics.

The initial capacity of the Centre Court is not known. In 1881 temporary covered stands (A, B and C) were erected on three sides of the Centre Court and in 1884 stand A was converted into a permanent stand, to be followed in 1885 by the conversion of stands B and C. In 1886 the three stands were joined at the corners to form a continuous structure. The stands were considerably enlarged in 1906 and in 1909 a new stand B was constructed increasing capacity by 600 seats. In 1914 the seating capacity was increased from 2,300 to 3,500 and this remained unchanged until the move to the new ground at Church Road.

The court suffered from bomb damage during World War II when five 500 lb bombs hit the Centre Court during an air attack in October 1940. 1,200 seats in the stadium were destroyed and although play resumed on time after the war in 1946, the court wasn't fully repaired until 1949.

The original centre court roof from 1922, which partly covers the stands, has been modified several times. In 1979, it was raised by one metre to allow the capacity to be increased by 1,088. Further building work came in 1992 with a replacement of the roof and a modified structure which allowed 3,601 seats to have a clearer view of the court which had previously been restricted by the number of roof supports.

A full retractable roof (see below) was completed in 2009, and capacity increased to 15,000 by adding six rows of seats to the upper tier on the east, north, and west sides. New media facilities, scoreboards including video, and commentary boxes were built to replace those currently in the upper tier. New wider seats were installed and new additional stairs and lifts were added.

== Retractable roof ==
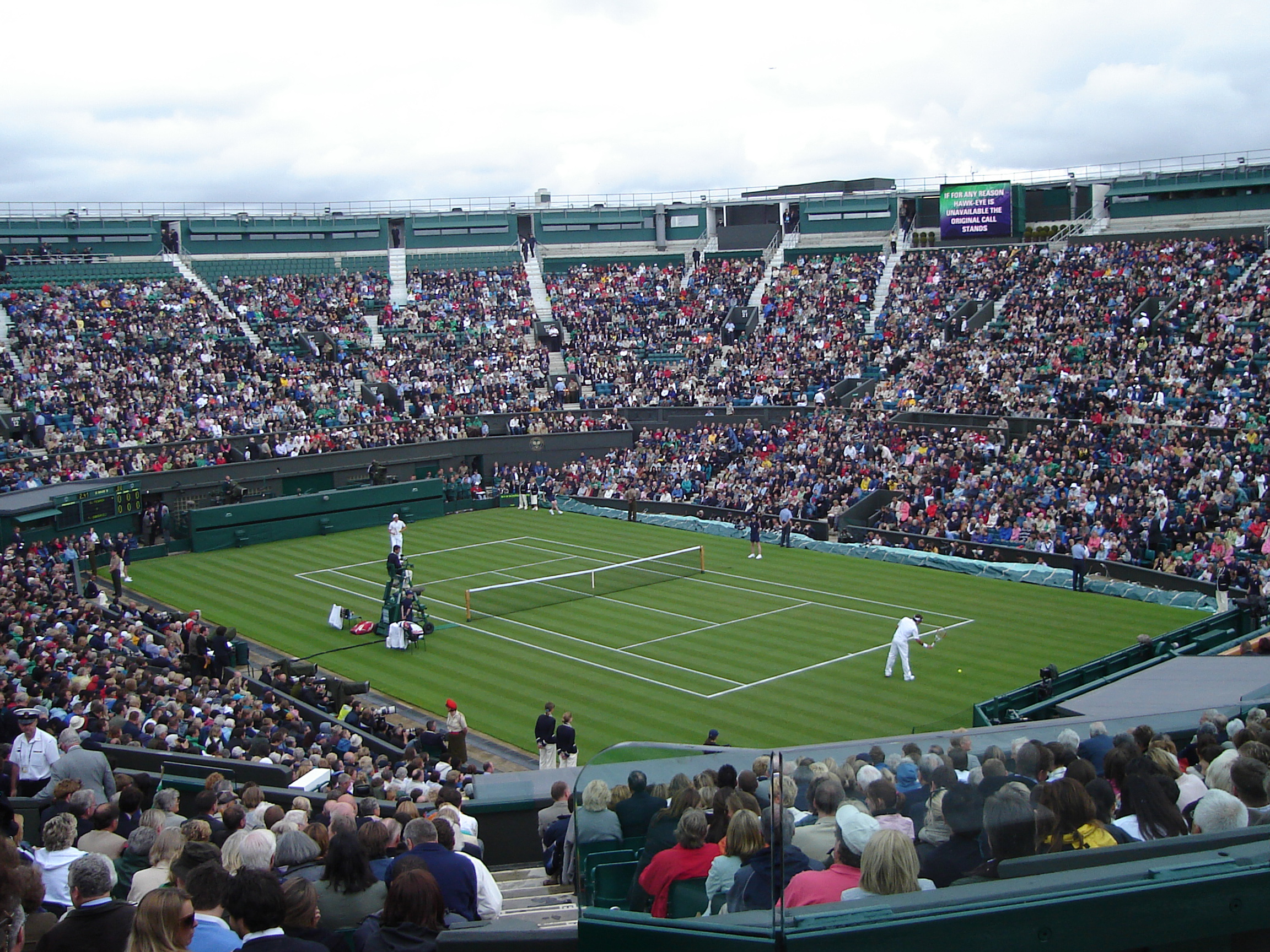
A roof-less Centre Court during the 2007 Wimbledon Championships.

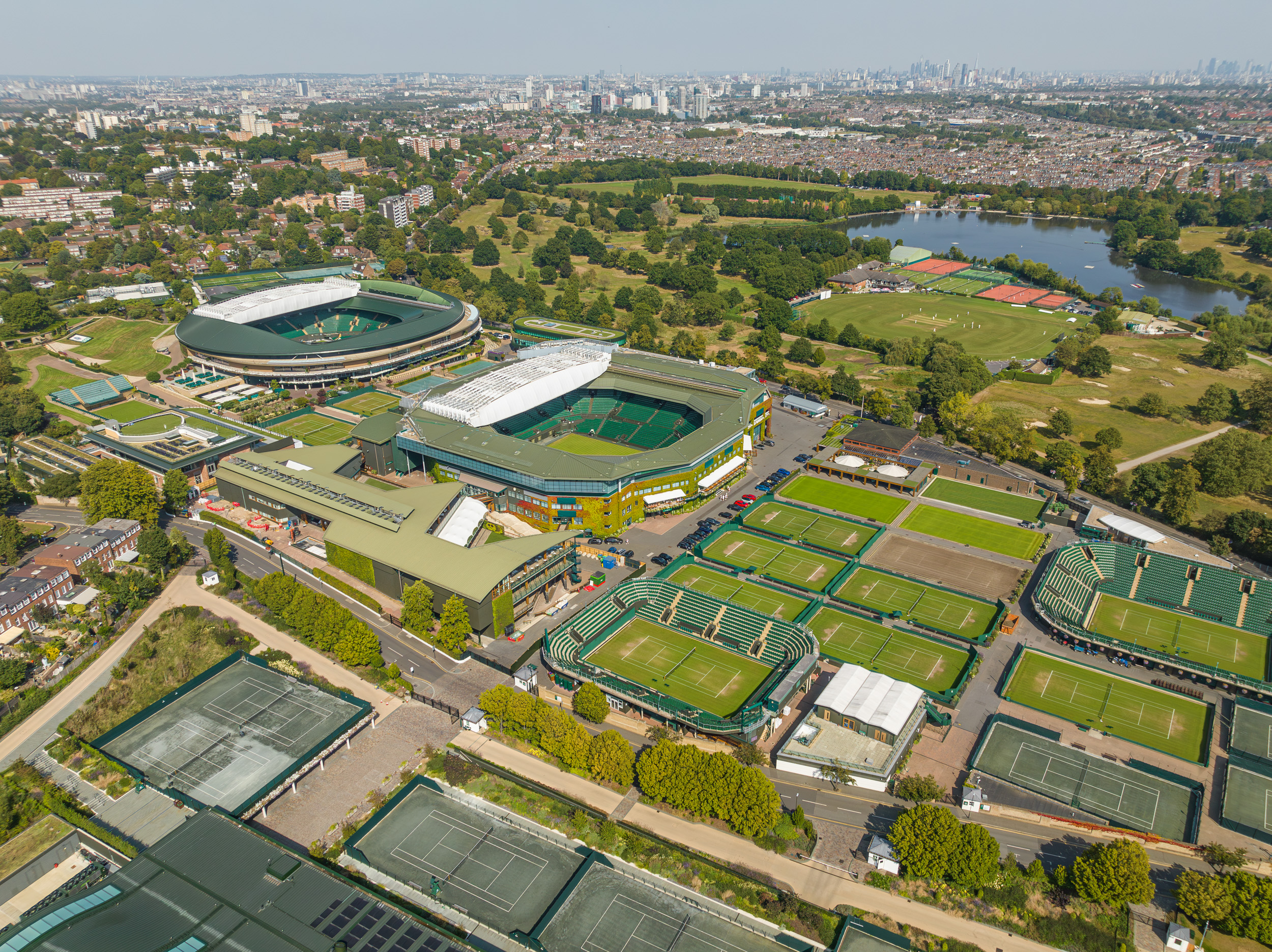
Centre Court is the large rectangular building at the centre of this aerial view

After many years of debate by players, fans, media and officials that often occurred during rain delays, the All England Club finally decided to build a retractable roof to cover the entire court. Building work began with the removal of the existing roof over the stands at the end of the 2006 championships. There was no roof over the stands for the 2007 event, and fixed parts of the new construction were visible the following year. The lack of a roof played a key role in the finish to the now-legendary 2008 Wimbledon men's final, which saw the match end in near-darkness after nearly two hours of rain delays. The completed retractable roof structure was ready for the 2009 Championships, being unveiled in April 2009 and tested with a capacity audience during an exhibition match on 17 May 2009, featuring Andre Agassi, Steffi Graf, Tim Henman, and Kim Clijsters (subsequently returning from retirement).

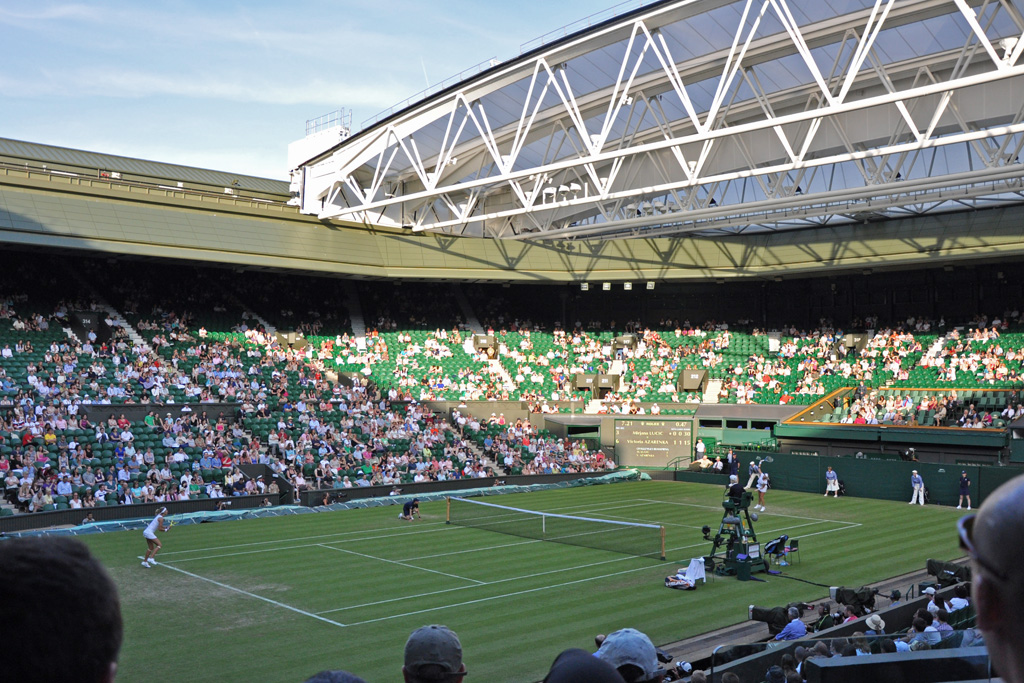
Centre Court during the 2010 Wimbledon Championships with the new retractable roof

The roof takes up to 10 minutes to close, during which time play is suspended. However, the time to transfer from outside to inside play can be up to 45 minutes while the air-conditioning system acclimatises the nearly 15,000-seat stadium for indoor-grass competition. The tournament rules for the Wimbledon fortnight dictate that the roof, once closed, must remain closed until the end of the match, so some matches may be completed indoors even though the sun has re-emerged.

The roof was closed for the first time during a competitive Championships match at about 4:40 pm on Monday 29 June 2009, during the fourth round Ladies Singles match between Amélie Mauresmo and Dinara Safina.

The first full match to be played with the roof closed was a men's singles fourth round match between British player Andy Murray and Switzerland's Stanislas Wawrinka. Play on Centre Court had never gone past 9:17 pm, but with the roof closed and the floodlights on, the match could be completed after dark – at 10:38 pm. Merton Council's environmental chief David Simpson said after Murray's late-night win that late-night tennis would not cause any problems. However, when the record late finish was surpassed in 2010 during a match between Novak Djokovic and Olivier Rochus which ran until 10:58 pm it was reported that Merton council had imposed a curfew of 11:00 pm BST on Centre Court. This was then exceeded on Saturday 30 June 2012, when Andy Murray beat Marcos Baghdatis in their 3rd round match, which was completed at 11:02 pm, in spite of the 11:00 pm ruling.

On Sunday 8 July 2012, Andy Murray and Roger Federer contested the first Wimbledon final to be played partially under a roof.

The roof was designed by SCX Special Projects Ltd and controls for mobilising the roof were designed by Fairfield Control Systems Ltd. and Moog who supplied the electric control system comprising electric actuators, servo motors, servo drives and closed-loop controllers. All companies undertake all the planned preventative maintenance.

The roof's ten trusses each weigh 100 tonnes, and the total weight, including non-moving parts, is 3,000 tonnes. The total area of the roof when fully deployed is 5,200 m^{2}. The cost of the roof has not been disclosed by the club, but is estimated at £80–£100 million.

== Scoreboard ==
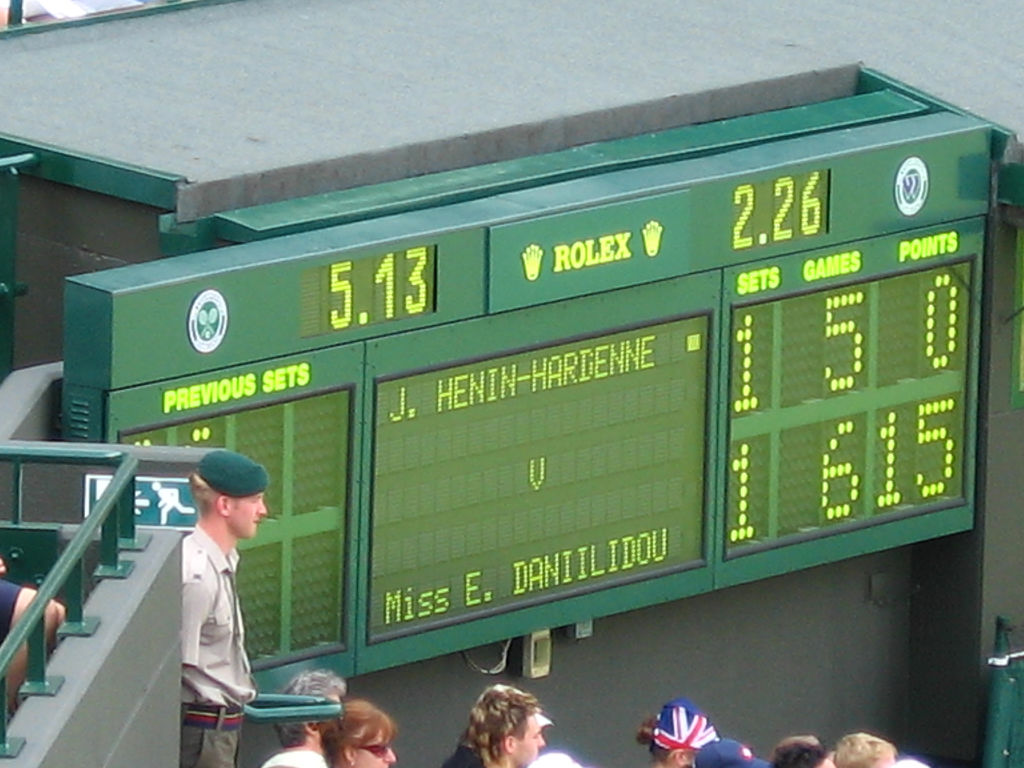
Dot-matrix Wimbledon scoreboard in use from 1982 to 2008 (photo from No. 1 Court.)

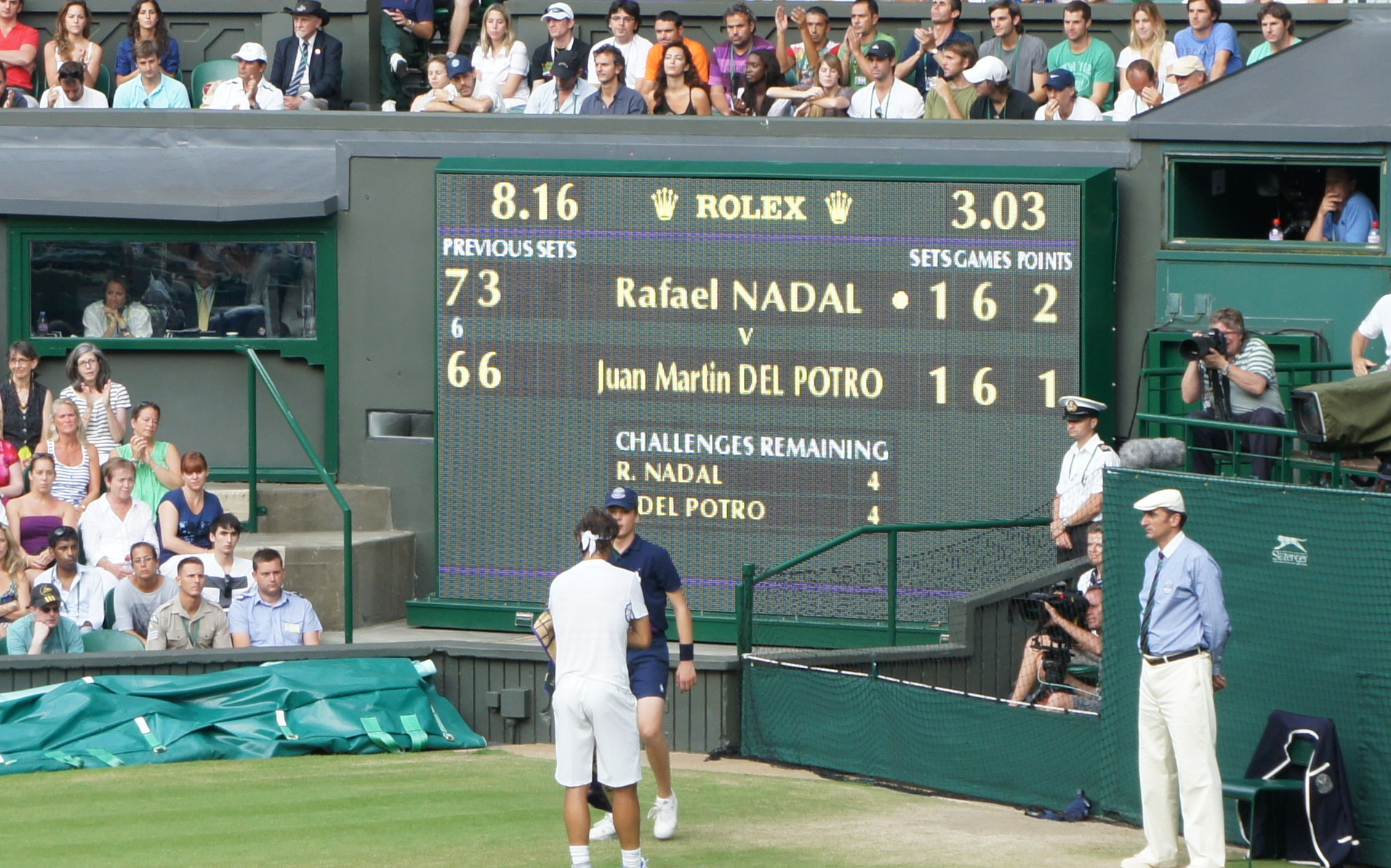
New LED Centre Court scoreboard.

The Scoreboard on centre court's present shape and layout closely reflect that of the original scoreboard installed in the 1950s, which featured manually inserted panels for player names and incandescent-lightbulb display of scores. In 1982, dot matrix scoreboards on the same layout were installed on Wimbledon courts. These were replaced in 2008 by full colour LED screens intended to provide full Hawk-Eye replays to the crowd in the stadium.

== Inscription ==
There is an inscription above the entryway to Centre Court which reads "If you can meet with triumph and disaster / And treat those two impostors just the same" – lines from Rudyard Kipling's poem If—.

== Longest Match ==
The longest recorded match played on Centre Court was the 2008 Wimbledon Championships men’s singles final, contested between Rafael Nadal and Roger Federer. The match had a duration of 4 hours and 48 minutes of play and ended with a score of 6–4, 6–4, 6–7(5–7), 6–7(8–10), 9–7, with Nadal securing his first of two Wimbledon Championships singles titles. According to the Guinness World Records, this match is also the longest recorded Wimbledon Championships men's singles final in history. Due to the quality of play and the involvement of two of the greatest players ever, this final is regarded by many as the greatest tennis match ever played.

== See also ==
- No. 1 Court
- No. 2 Court
- No. 3 Court
- List of tennis stadiums by capacity

Preceded by Stade Roland Garros; Paris	Davis Cup; Final Venue; 1934 • 1935 • 1936 • 1937	Succeeded by Germantown Cricket Club; Philadelphia
