= 2025 Wimbledon Championships – Men's singles qualifying =

Gentlemen's singles qualifying
- 2025 Wimbledon Championships

Events
Singles	men	women		boys	girls
Doubles	men	women	mixed	boys	girls
WC Singles	men	women	quad
WC Doubles	men	women	quad
14&U Singles	boys	girls
Legends	men	women	mixed

Qualification
Singles	men	women
- Wimbledon Championships

The 2025 Wimbledon Championships – Men's singles qualifying was a series of tennis matches that took place from 23 to 26 June 2025 to determine the sixteen qualifiers into the main draw of the men's singles tournament.

Only 16 out of the 128 qualifiers who competed in this knock-out tournament, secured a main draw place.

Players Alastair Gray and Nicolai Budkov Kjær playing at the 2025 Wimbledon Championships Men's singles qualifying.

== Seeds ==
The qualifying entry list was released based on the ATP rankings for the week of 26 May 2025. All seeds are per ATP rankings as of 16 June 2025.

1. (Hungary) Márton Fucsovics (qualifying competition, lucky loser)
2. (Australia) Tristan Schoolkate (second round)
3. (Argentina) Juan Manuel Cerúndolo (first round)
4. (Colombia) Daniel Elahi Galán (first round)
5. (Chile) Tomás Barrios Vera (qualifying competition)
6. (France) Valentin Royer (qualified)
7. (France) Arthur Cazaux (qualified)
8. (Chile) Cristian Garín (qualifying competition, lucky loser)
9. (United States) Tristan Boyer (first round)
10. (United States) Eliot Spizzirri (second round)
11. (Portugal) Jaime Faria (qualified)
12. (Brazil) Thiago Seyboth Wild (first round)
13. (United States) Emilio Nava (second round)
14. (France) Térence Atmane (first round)
15. (Czech Republic) Dalibor Svrčina (second round)
16. (Georgia (country)) Nikoloz Basilashvili (qualified)
17. (France) Pierre-Hugues Herbert (first round)
18. (France) Adrian Mannarino (qualified)
19. (Argentina) Thiago Agustín Tirante (first round)
20. (Spain) Carlos Taberner (first round)
21. (Argentina) Román Andrés Burruchaga (second round)
22. (Lithuania) Vilius Gaubas (second round)
23. (Italy) Matteo Gigante (first round)
24. (Argentina) Federico Agustín Gómez (second round)
25. (Italy) Andrea Pellegrino (first round)
26. (Serbia) Dušan Lajović (qualifying competition, lucky loser)
27. (Germany) Yannick Hanfmann (second round)
28. (Brazil) Thiago Monteiro (first round, retired)
29. (Belgium) Alexander Blockx (qualifying competition)
30. (Austria) Filip Misolic (qualified)
31. (Italy) Francesco Passaro (first round)
32. (Chile) Nicolás Jarry (qualified)

== Qualifiers ==
1. (Luxembourg) Chris Rodesch
2. (Austria) Filip Misolic
3. (Switzerland) Leandro Riedi
4. (France) Adrian Mannarino
5. (Australia) James McCabe
6. (France) Valentin Royer
7. (France) Arthur Cazaux
8. (Italy) Giulio Zeppieri
9. (Kazakhstan) Beibit Zhukayev
10. (Australia) Alex Bolt
11. (Portugal) Jaime Faria
12. (Denmark) August Holmgren
13. (Japan) Shintaro Mochizuki
14. (United Kingdom) Oliver Tarvet
15. (Chile) Nicolás Jarry
16. (Georgia (country)) Nikoloz Basilashvili

== Lucky losers ==
1. (Hungary) Márton Fucsovics
2. (Serbia) Dušan Lajović
3. (Chile) Cristian Garín

== Draw ==
Key

- Q = Qualifier
- WC = Wild card
- LL = Lucky loser
- Alt = Alternate
- ITF = ITF entry
- PR = Protected ranking
- SR = Special ranking
- SE = Special exempt
- JE = Junior exempt
- JR = Junior Accelerator Programme entrant
- CO = College Accelerator Programme entrant
- NG = Next Gen Accelerator Program entrant
- w/o = Walkover
- r = Retired
- d = Defaulted

=== First qualifier ===
First round
1	(Hungary) Márton Fucsovics	6	6
(Austria) Jurij Rodionov	4	3
(United States) Zachary Svajda	6	6
(Austria) Lukas Neumayer	2	3
(United Kingdom) Jan Choinski	6	4	3
(Estonia) Mark Lajal	3	6	6
(Luxembourg) Chris Rodesch	6	6
23	(Italy) Matteo Gigante	2	4

Second round
1	(Hungary) Márton Fucsovics	7^{7}	6
(United States) Zachary Svajda	6^{5}	3
(Estonia) Mark Lajal	1	3
(Luxembourg) Chris Rodesch	6	6

Qualifying competition
1	(Hungary) Márton Fucsovics	3	4	6	6^{4}
(Luxembourg) Chris Rodesch	6	6	0	7^{7}

=== Second qualifier ===
First round
2	(Australia) Tristan Schoolkate	6^{4}	6	6
(Argentina) Facundo Díaz Acosta	7^{7}	1	3
(Croatia) Duje Ajduković	6^{7}	0
(Lebanon) Benjamin Hassan	7^{9}	6
(France) Constant Lestienne	2	6	4
(Belgium) Gauthier Onclin	6	4	6
(Netherlands) Guy den Ouden	6	1	5
30	(Austria) Filip Misolic	3	6	7

Second round
2	(Australia) Tristan Schoolkate	6^{4}	3
(Lebanon) Benjamin Hassan	7^{7}	6
(Belgium) Gauthier Onclin	4	2
30	(Austria) Filip Misolic	6	6

Qualifying competition
(Lebanon) Benjamin Hassan	6	6^{6}	6^{5}	3
30	(Austria) Filip Misolic	2	7^{8}	7^{7}	6

=== Third qualifier ===
First round
3	(Argentina) Juan Manuel Cerúndolo	6^{5}	2
(France) Luca Van Assche	7^{7}	6
WC	(United Kingdom) Hamish Stewart	4	5
(Monaco) Valentin Vacherot	6	6^{r}
PR	(Switzerland) Leandro Riedi	6	7
(China) Sun Fajing	4	5
(Italy) Federico Arnaboldi	4	4
24	(Argentina) Federico Agustín Gómez	6	6

Second round
(France) Luca Van Assche	6^{3}	6	6^{9}
WC	(United Kingdom) Hamish Stewart	7^{7}	4	7^{11}
PR	(Switzerland) Leandro Riedi	4	6	7^{10}
24	(Argentina) Federico Agustín Gómez	6	3	6^{8}

Qualifying competition
WC	(United Kingdom) Hamish Stewart	3	6	3	4
PR	(Switzerland) Leandro Riedi	6	4	6	6

=== Fourth qualifier ===
First round
4	(Colombia) Daniel Elahi Galán	3	2
(Australia) Li Tu	6	6
(Tunisia) Aziz Dougaz	6	3	4
(Japan) Sho Shimabukuro	4	6	6
(China) Bai Yan	6^{3}	2
WC	(Norway) Nicolai Budkov Kjær	7^{7}	6
(Argentina) Andrea Collarini	4	2
18	(France) Adrian Mannarino	6	6

Second round
(Australia) Li Tu	3	7^{10}	7^{11}
(Japan) Sho Shimabukuro	6	6^{8}	6^{9}
WC	(Norway) Nicolai Budkov Kjær	2	3
18	(France) Adrian Mannarino	6	6

Qualifying competition
(Australia) Li Tu	6	3	4	4
18	(France) Adrian Mannarino	3	6	6	6

=== Fifth qualifier ===
First round
5	(Chile) Tomás Barrios Vera	6	6
WC	(United Kingdom) James Story	0	2
(Portugal) Henrique Rocha	6	6
(Bolivia) Murkel Dellien	3	1
(Australia) James McCabe	6	7
(Croatia) Borna Gojo	4	5
(Kazakhstan) Dmitry Popko	2	1
21	(Argentina) Román Andrés Burruchaga	6	6

Second round
5	(Chile) Tomás Barrios Vera	6	6
(Portugal) Henrique Rocha	4	3
(Australia) James McCabe	6	6
21	(Argentina) Román Andrés Burruchaga	1	4

Qualifying competition
5	(Chile) Tomás Barrios Vera	6	3	6^{5}	6^{7}
(Australia) James McCabe	4	6	7^{7}	7^{9}

=== Sixth qualifier ===
First round
6	(France) Valentin Royer	4	6	6
(Switzerland) Marc-Andrea Hüsler	6	0	2
(Japan) Yasutaka Uchiyama	6	6
(Netherlands) Gijs Brouwer	2	3
(Lithuania) Edas Butvilas	6^{8}	3
(Japan) Taro Daniel	7^{10}	6
(France) Titouan Droguet	6	7
25	(Italy) Andrea Pellegrino	1	5

Second round
6	(France) Valentin Royer	7^{7}	7
(Japan) Yasutaka Uchiyama	6^{5}	5
(Japan) Taro Daniel	4	6	4
(France) Titouan Droguet	6	4	6

Qualifying competition
6	(France) Valentin Royer	6	6	6
(France) Titouan Droguet	3	4	2

=== Seventh qualifier ===
First round
7	(France) Arthur Cazaux	6	6^{11}	6
(Peru) Ignacio Buse	2	7^{13}	1
(Spain) Daniel Rincón	5	6^{5}
(France) Ugo Blanchet	7	7^{7}
WC	(United Kingdom) Alastair Gray	7	3	4
(France) Arthur Bouquier	5	6	6
(Canada) Liam Draxl	6	3	3
26	(Serbia) Dušan Lajović	3	6	6

Second round
7	(France) Arthur Cazaux	7	6
(France) Ugo Blanchet	5	4
(France) Arthur Bouquier	2	4
26	(Serbia) Dušan Lajović	6	6

Qualifying competition
7	(France) Arthur Cazaux	6^{6}	6	6	6
26	(Serbia) Dušan Lajović	7^{8}	2	3	4

=== Eighth qualifier ===
First round
8	(Chile) Cristian Garín	6	6
(Italy) Francesco Maestrelli	3	4
(Romania) Filip Cristian Jianu	6	1	5
(Lebanon) Hady Habib	4	6	7
(India) Sumit Nagal	2	6	2
PR	(Italy) Giulio Zeppieri	6	4	6
WC	(United Kingdom) Paul Jubb	6	6
19	(Argentina) Thiago Agustín Tirante	3	2

Second round
8	(Chile) Cristian Garín	6	6
(Lebanon) Hady Habib	0	4
PR	(Italy) Giulio Zeppieri	6	6
WC	(United Kingdom) Paul Jubb	3	2

Qualifying competition
8	(Chile) Cristian Garín	6	2	4	7	5
PR	(Italy) Giulio Zeppieri	1	6	6	5	7

=== Ninth qualifier ===
First round
9	(United States) Tristan Boyer	6^{5}	6^{2}
(France) Luka Pavlovic	7^{7}	7^{7}
(Japan) James Trotter	7^{7}	6
(France) Calvin Hemery	6^{1}	4
(Kazakhstan) Beibit Zhukayev	7	4	7^{10}
(Ukraine) Vitaliy Sachko	5	6	6^{3}
(France) Hugo Grenier	5	2
27	(Germany) Yannick Hanfmann	7	6

Second round
(France) Luka Pavlovic	6	6^{5}	7^{10}
(Japan) James Trotter	3	7^{7}	6^{6}
(Kazakhstan) Beibit Zhukayev	7^{9}	6
27	(Germany) Yannick Hanfmann	6^{7}	3

Qualifying competition
(France) Luka Pavlovic	6	3	2	6^{5}
(Kazakhstan) Beibit Zhukayev	3	6	6	7^{7}

=== Tenth qualifier ===
First round
10	(United States) Eliot Spizzirri	7^{7}	6^{6}	6
(Spain) Alejandro Moro Cañas	6^{4}	7^{8}	4
(Australia) Alex Bolt	6	6
(France) Harold Mayot	3	4
PR	(Argentina) Facundo Bagnis	3	1
WC	(United Kingdom) Ryan Peniston	6	6
(Spain) Martín Landaluce	6	3	7^{10}
31	(Italy) Francesco Passaro	2	6	6^{6}

Second round
10	(United States) Eliot Spizzirri	6^{5}	6	2
(Australia) Alex Bolt	7^{7}	2	6
WC	(United Kingdom) Ryan Peniston	6	4	4
(Spain) Martín Landaluce	3	6	6

Qualifying competition
(Australia) Alex Bolt	6	6	6
(Spain) Martín Landaluce	1	2	4

=== Eleventh qualifier ===
First round
11	(Portugal) Jaime Faria	6	6
(Hungary) Zsombor Piros	4	2
(Argentina) Marco Trungelliti	2	6	6
Alibek Kachmazov	6	3	3
(Germany) Maximilian Marterer	1	7^{7}	1
(France) Kyrian Jacquet	6	6^{5}	6
(Japan) Yuta Shimizu	7^{7}	4	4
22	(Lithuania) Vilius Gaubas	6^{2}	6	6

Second round
11	(Portugal) Jaime Faria	6	7
(Argentina) Marco Trungelliti	3	5
(France) Kyrian Jacquet	6	7
22	(Lithuania) Vilius Gaubas	3	5

Qualifying competition
11	(Portugal) Jaime Faria	7	4	6	6
(France) Kyrian Jacquet	5	6	3	2

=== Twelfth qualifier ===
First round
12	(Brazil) Thiago Seyboth Wild	6	4	3
(Kazakhstan) Mikhail Kukushkin	4	6	6
WC	(United Kingdom) Giles Hussey	6	3	5
(Denmark) August Holmgren	4	6	7
(United States) Colton Smith	6	6
(Argentina) Santiago Rodríguez Taverna	4	1
(Japan) Yosuke Watanuki	7^{11}	6
28	(Brazil) Thiago Monteiro	6^{9}	6^{r}

Second round
(Kazakhstan) Mikhail Kukushkin	6	6^{4}	2
(Denmark) August Holmgren	4	7^{7}	6
(United States) Colton Smith	6^{3}	3
(Japan) Yosuke Watanuki	7^{7}	6

Qualifying competition
(Denmark) August Holmgren	6	6^{2}	3	7^{13}	7^{10}
(Japan) Yosuke Watanuki	4	7^{7}	6	6^{11}	6^{7}

=== Thirteenth qualifier ===
First round
13	(United States) Emilio Nava	7^{8}	7^{7}
(United States) Mitchell Krueger	6^{6}	6^{3}
(Georgia (country)) Saba Purtseladze	3	2
(Switzerland) Dominic Stricker	6	6
(Brazil) Felipe Meligeni Alves	6	0	7^{10}
(Ecuador) Álvaro Guillén Meza	3	6	6^{4}
(Japan) Shintaro Mochizuki	6	6
17	(France) Pierre-Hugues Herbert	1	1

Second round
13	(United States) Emilio Nava	6^{2}	4
(Switzerland) Dominic Stricker	7^{7}	6
(Brazil) Felipe Meligeni Alves	3	3
(Japan) Shintaro Mochizuki	6	6

Qualifying competition
(Switzerland) Dominic Stricker	6^{3}	6	2	4
(Japan) Shintaro Mochizuki	7^{7}	3	6	6

=== Fourteenth qualifier ===
First round
14	(France) Térence Atmane	1	6^{2}
WC	(United Kingdom) Oliver Tarvet	6	7^{7}
(Canada) Alexis Galarneau	6	2	6
(United States) Murphy Cassone	4	6	4
(Kazakhstan) Timofey Skatov	6	6
PR	(Italy) Stefano Napolitano	1	4
(Argentina) Facundo Mena	5	1
29	(Belgium) Alexander Blockx	7	6

Second round
WC	(United Kingdom) Oliver Tarvet	6	6
(Canada) Alexis Galarneau	3	2
(Kazakhstan) Timofey Skatov	4	5
29	(Belgium) Alexander Blockx	6	7

Qualifying competition
WC	(United Kingdom) Oliver Tarvet	6	3	6	6
29	(Belgium) Alexander Blockx	3	6	2	1

=== Fifteenth qualifier ===
First round
15	(Czech Republic) Dalibor Svrčina	6	6
(Australia) Omar Jasika	1	2
(Switzerland) Jérôme Kym	2	4
(Slovakia) Lukáš Klein	6	6
(Slovakia) Jozef Kovalík	6	6^{5}	7^{10}
(France) Antoine Escoffier	4	7^{7}	6^{7}
Pavel Kotov	6^{5}	1
32	(Chile) Nicolás Jarry	7^{7}	6

Second round
15	(Czech Republic) Dalibor Svrčina	6^{5}	5
(Slovakia) Lukáš Klein	7^{7}	7
(Slovakia) Jozef Kovalík	3	4
32	(Chile) Nicolás Jarry	6	6

Qualifying competition
(Slovakia) Lukáš Klein	4	2	4
32	(Chile) Nicolás Jarry	6	6	6

=== Sixteenth qualifier ===
First round
16	(Georgia (country)) Nikoloz Basilashvili	6	4	6
PR	(Spain) Pablo Llamas Ruiz	3	6	3
(Spain) Pol Martín Tiffon	3	4
(Hong Kong) Coleman Wong	6	6
WC	(United Kingdom) Oliver Bonding	7	2	6
Alt	(Norway) Viktor Durasovic	5	6	4
(Argentina) Juan Pablo Ficovich	7^{7}	6
20	(Spain) Carlos Taberner	6^{0}	3

Second round
16	(Georgia (country)) Nikoloz Basilashvili	7^{7}	7^{7}
(Hong Kong) Coleman Wong	6^{1}	6^{3}
WC	(United Kingdom) Oliver Bonding	5	4
(Argentina) Juan Pablo Ficovich	7	6

Qualifying competition
16	(Georgia (country)) Nikoloz Basilashvili	1	7	6	6
(Argentina) Juan Pablo Ficovich	6	5	2	1
