= 2025 Wimbledon Championships – Women's singles qualifying =

Ladies' singles qualifying
- 2025 Wimbledon Championships

Events
Singles	men	women		boys	girls
Doubles	men	women	mixed	boys	girls
WC Singles	men	women	quad
WC Doubles	men	women	quad
14&U Singles	boys	girls
Legends	men	women	mixed

Qualification
Singles	men	women
- Wimbledon Championships

The 2025 Wimbledon Championships – Women's singles qualifying was a series of tennis matches that took place from 24 to 26 June 2025 to determine the sixteen qualifiers into the main draw of the women's singles tournament, and, if necessary, the lucky losers.

Only 16 out of the 128 qualifiers who competed in this knock-out tournament, secured a main draw place.

== Seeds ==
The qualifying entry list was released based on the WTA rankings for the week of 26 May 2025. All seeds are per WTA rankings as of 16 June 2025.

1. (France) Loïs Boisson (first round)
2. (Spain) Nuria Párrizas Díaz (second round)
3. (United States) Iva Jovic (qualified)
4. Anastasia Zakharova (qualified)
5. (France) Léolia Jeanjean (first round)
6. (Canada) Victoria Mboko (qualifying competition, lucky loser)
7. (United States) Taylor Townsend (qualified)
8. (Croatia) Antonia Ružić (first round)
9. (Canada) Rebecca Marino (first round)
10. (Argentina) Solana Sierra (qualifying competition, lucky loser)
11. Erika Andreeva (first round)
12. Aliaksandra Sasnovich (qualified)
13. (Germany) Ella Seidel (qualified)
14. (Switzerland) Rebeka Masarova (second round)
15. (France) Elsa Jacquemot (qualified)
16. (United States) Robin Montgomery (qualifying competition)
17. (France) Diane Parry (qualified)
18. (Czech Republic) Tereza Valentová (qualifying competition)
19. (United States) Varvara Lepchenko (first round)
20. (Argentina) María Lourdes Carlé (first round)
21. (Japan) Ena Shibahara (qualifying competition)
22. (Poland) Maja Chwalińska (first round)
23. (China) Zhang Shuai (qualified)
24. (Australia) Talia Gibson (qualified)
25. (Switzerland) Simona Waltert (first round)
26. (Latvia) Darja Semeņistaja (qualifying competition)
27. (China) Wei Sijia (first round)
28. (France) Jessika Ponchet (first round)
29. (Andorra) Victoria Jiménez Kasintseva (second round)
30. (Australia) Priscilla Hon (qualified)
31. (Australia) Daria Saville (first round)
32. (Poland) Katarzyna Kawa (qualifying competition)

== Qualifiers ==
1. (Canada) Carson Branstine
2. (Czech Republic) Linda Fruhvirtová
3. (United States) Iva Jovic
4. Anastasia Zakharova
5. (Slovenia) Veronika Erjavec
6. (Australia) Priscilla Hon
7. (United States) Taylor Townsend
8. (France) Diane Parry
9. (China) Zhang Shuai
10. (Australia) Talia Gibson
11. (Croatia) Petra Martić
12. Aliaksandra Sasnovich
13. (Germany) Ella Seidel
14. (Serbia) Nina Stojanović
15. (France) Elsa Jacquemot
16. (Slovenia) Kaja Juvan

== Lucky losers ==
1. (Argentina) Solana Sierra
2. (Canada) Victoria Mboko

== Draw ==
Key

- Q = Qualifier
- WC = Wild card
- LL = Lucky loser
- Alt = Alternate
- ITF = ITF entry
- PR = Protected ranking
- SR = Special ranking
- SE = Special exempt
- JE = Junior exempt
- JR = Junior Accelerator Programme entrant
- CO = College Accelerator Programme entrant
- NG = Next Gen Accelerator Program entrant
- w/o = Walkover
- r = Retired
- d = Defaulted

=== First qualifier ===
First round
1/PR	(France) Loïs Boisson	2	7^{7}	4
(Canada) Carson Branstine	6	6^{1}	6
(Canada) Bianca Andreescu	6	6
(Brazil) Laura Pigossi	2	1
(China) Wang Xiyu	7	3	6
Kristina Dmitruk	5	6	3
(Cyprus) Raluca Șerban	6	3	6
22	(Poland) Maja Chwalińska	4	6	2

Second round
(Canada) Carson Branstine	7^{7}	4	6
(Canada) Bianca Andreescu	6^{3}	6	1
(China) Wang Xiyu	4	2
(Cyprus) Raluca Șerban	6	6

Qualifying competition
(Canada) Carson Branstine	4	7^{8}	6
(Cyprus) Raluca Șerban	6	6^{6}	2

=== Second qualifier ===
First round
2	(Spain) Nuria Párrizas Díaz	6	6
(Lithuania) Justina Mikulskytė	1	1
(Czech Republic) Linda Fruhvirtová	6	6
(Croatia) Lea Bošković	4	2
(Japan) Sara Saito	2	6^{6}
(Spain) Marina Bassols Ribera	6	7^{8}
PR	(Switzerland) Stefanie Vögele	4	4
21	(Japan) Ena Shibahara	6	6

Second round
2	(Spain) Nuria Párrizas Díaz	3	1
(Czech Republic) Linda Fruhvirtová	6	6
(Spain) Marina Bassols Ribera	6^{5}	7^{7}	5
21	(Japan) Ena Shibahara	7^{7}	6^{5}	7

Qualifying competition
(Czech Republic) Linda Fruhvirtová	6	7
21	(Japan) Ena Shibahara	3	5

=== Third qualifier ===
First round
3	(United States) Iva Jovic	6	4	6
(Poland) Linda Klimovičová	4	6	4
(Australia) Taylah Preston	4	2
(Argentina) Julia Riera	6	6
(Austria) Julia Grabher	4	6	3
WC	(United Kingdom) Amarni Banks	6	1	6
WC	(United Kingdom) Ranah Stoiber	7	4	1
32	(Poland) Katarzyna Kawa	5	6	6

Second round
3	(United States) Iva Jovic	6	4	6
(Argentina) Julia Riera	1	6	1
WC	(United Kingdom) Amarni Banks	2	4
32	(Poland) Katarzyna Kawa	6	6

Qualifying competition
3	(United States) Iva Jovic	6	7^{7}
32	(Poland) Katarzyna Kawa	3	6^{2}

=== Fourth qualifier ===
First round
4	Anastasia Zakharova	6	2	6
(Australia) Lizette Cabrera	4	6	3
(Romania) Ana Bogdan	6	6
Ekaterina Makarova	4	1
PR	(Romania) Mihaela Buzărnescu	1	5
(Italy) Lucrezia Stefanini	6	7
(United States) Maria Mateas	2	3
18	(Czech Republic) Tereza Valentová	6	6

Second round
4	Anastasia Zakharova	6^{1}	7^{7}	6
(Romania) Ana Bogdan	7^{7}	6^{1}	3
(Italy) Lucrezia Stefanini	6	4	3
18	(Czech Republic) Tereza Valentová	3	6	6

Qualifying competition
4	Anastasia Zakharova	7^{7}	2	7^{10}
18	(Czech Republic) Tereza Valentová	6^{1}	6	6^{7}

=== Fifth qualifier ===
First round
5	(France) Léolia Jeanjean	2	6	2
(Slovenia) Veronika Erjavec	6	3	6
(Japan) Sayaka Ishii	5	1
(Liechtenstein) Kathinka von Deichmann	7	6
(Argentina) Jazmín Ortenzi	3	4
(Czech Republic) Barbora Palicová	6	6
WC	(United Kingdom) Emily Appleton	6^{4}	6	6
25	(Switzerland) Simona Waltert	7^{7}	4	3

Second round
(Slovenia) Veronika Erjavec	6	6
(Liechtenstein) Kathinka von Deichmann	3	4
(Czech Republic) Barbora Palicová	2	7^{8}	6^{7}
WC	(United Kingdom) Emily Appleton	6	6^{6}	7^{10}

Qualifying competition
(Slovenia) Veronika Erjavec	6	2	6
WC	(United Kingdom) Emily Appleton	2	6	0

=== Sixth qualifier ===
First round
6	(Canada) Victoria Mboko	2	7^{9}	6
(Japan) Nao Hibino	6	6^{7}	2
(Switzerland) Valentina Ryser	6	7^{7}
(Australia) Astra Sharma	4	6^{3}
(Spain) Guiomar Maristany	1	6	6^{3}
(Switzerland) Leonie Küng	6	3	7^{10}
Elena Pridankina	5	6	1
30	(Australia) Priscilla Hon	7	3	6

Second round
6	(Canada) Victoria Mboko	6	6
(Switzerland) Valentina Ryser	3	3
(Switzerland) Leonie Küng	1	3
30	(Australia) Priscilla Hon	6	6

Qualifying competition
6	(Canada) Victoria Mboko	6	6^{4}	1
30	(Australia) Priscilla Hon	4	7^{7}	6

=== Seventh qualifier ===
First round
7	(United States) Taylor Townsend	6	6
(United States) Louisa Chirico	4	2
(Belgium) Sofia Costoulas	2	6^{3}
(United States) Hina Inoue	6	7^{7}
(France) Chloé Paquet	4	6	4
(Switzerland) Céline Naef	6	4	6
(Georgia (country)) Mariam Bolkvadze	7	6
19	(United States) Varvara Lepchenko	5	4

Second round
7	(United States) Taylor Townsend	6	6
(United States) Hina Inoue	3	1
(Switzerland) Céline Naef	6	6
(Georgia (country)) Mariam Bolkvadze	1	1

Qualifying competition
7	(United States) Taylor Townsend	6	6
(Switzerland) Céline Naef	3	3

=== Eighth qualifier ===
First round
8	(Croatia) Antonia Ružić	1	6	0
(Australia) Emerson Jones	6	0	6
(Serbia) Lola Radivojević	4	7^{7}	6
(United States) Hanna Chang	6	6^{3}	1
Alina Charaeva	7^{7}	6
(Germany) Mona Barthel	6^{3}	1
(Ukraine) Oleksandra Oliynykova	1	6	3
17	(France) Diane Parry	6	3	6

Second round
(Australia) Emerson Jones	6	6
(Serbia) Lola Radivojević	4	4
Alina Charaeva	6^{3}	2
17	(France) Diane Parry	7^{7}	6

Qualifying competition
(Australia) Emerson Jones	2	2
17	(France) Diane Parry	6	6

=== Ninth qualifier ===
First round
9	(Canada) Rebecca Marino	6	3	1
(Czech Republic) Gabriela Knutson	3	6	6
(Thailand) Lanlana Tararudee	7	6
(France) Manon Léonard	5	1
(Austria) Sinja Kraus	3	4
(United States) Whitney Osuigwe	6	6
(United States) Lauren Davis	3	2
23	(China) Zhang Shuai	6	6

Second round
(Czech Republic) Gabriela Knutson	3	3
(Thailand) Lanlana Tararudee	6	6
(United States) Whitney Osuigwe	2	4
23	(China) Zhang Shuai	6	6

Qualifying competition
(Thailand) Lanlana Tararudee	2	2
23	(China) Zhang Shuai	6	6

=== Tenth qualifier ===
First round
10	(Argentina) Solana Sierra	6	6
(France) Tessah Andrianjafitrimo	1	3
WC	(United Kingdom) Katie Swan	6^{2}	6^{6}
(Spain) Leyre Romero Gormaz	7^{7}	7^{8}
(Netherlands) Arianne Hartono	6	6
(Slovenia) Tamara Zidanšek	3	4
(Spain) Andrea Lázaro García	3	3
24	(Australia) Talia Gibson	6	6

Second round
10	(Argentina) Solana Sierra	6	6
(Spain) Leyre Romero Gormaz	4	4
(Netherlands) Arianne Hartono	3	6	4
24	(Australia) Talia Gibson	6	4	6

Qualifying competition
10	(Argentina) Solana Sierra	4	6	5
24	(Australia) Talia Gibson	6	3	7

=== Eleventh qualifier ===
First round
11	Erika Andreeva	4	6^{3}
(France) Séléna Janicijevic	6	7^{7}
(Australia) Maddison Inglis	2	6	6^{10}
(Croatia) Petra Martić	6	3	7^{12}
(Australia) Destanee Aiava	6	5	6
(Croatia) Petra Marčinko	4	7	3
(Hungary) Panna Udvardy	7^{7}	6
31	(Australia) Daria Saville	6^{2}	1

Second round
(France) Séléna Janicijevic	2	4
(Croatia) Petra Martić	6	6
(Australia) Destanee Aiava	6	1	3
(Hungary) Panna Udvardy	2	6	6

Qualifying competition
(Croatia) Petra Martić	6	1	6
(Hungary) Panna Udvardy	2	6	3

=== Twelfth qualifier ===
First round
12	Aliaksandra Sasnovich	6	6
(Spain) Carlota Martínez Círez	0	0
Oksana Selekhmeteva	6	4	6
WC	(United Kingdom) Lily Miyazaki	4	6	2
Iryna Shymanovich	7^{8}	7^{7}
WC	(United Kingdom) Amelia Rajecki	6^{6}	6^{2}
WC	(United Kingdom) Ella McDonald	6	5	1
26	(Latvia) Darja Semeņistaja	4	7	6

Second round
12	Aliaksandra Sasnovich	6	6
Oksana Selekhmeteva	2	3
Iryna Shymanovich	4	2
26	(Latvia) Darja Semeņistaja	6	6

Qualifying competition
12	Aliaksandra Sasnovich	7	6
26	(Latvia) Darja Semeņistaja	5	3

=== Thirteenth qualifier ===
First round
13	(Germany) Ella Seidel	2	6	6
PR	(United States) Kayla Day	6	1	2
(Japan) Mai Hontama	3	3
(Germany) Jule Niemeier	6	6
PR	(Turkey) Berfu Cengiz	3	1
(Ukraine) Daria Snigur	6	6
(Croatia) Jana Fett	6	6
27	(China) Wei Sijia	3	2

Second round
13	(Germany) Ella Seidel	6	6
(Germany) Jule Niemeier	2	0
(Ukraine) Daria Snigur	7^{7}	2	3
(Croatia) Jana Fett	6^{2}	6	6

Qualifying competition
13	(Germany) Ella Seidel	6	4	6
(Croatia) Jana Fett	2	6	3

=== Fourteenth qualifier ===
First round
14	(Switzerland) Rebeka Masarova	6	7
PR	Alina Korneeva	0	5
(Serbia) Nina Stojanović	6	6^{1}	6
(Switzerland) Susan Bandecchi	3	7^{7}	2
WC	(Slovakia) Renáta Jamrichová	1	7	7
(Germany) Tamara Korpatsch	6	5	5
(Chinese Taipei) Joanna Garland	6	3	6
20	(Argentina) María Lourdes Carlé	1	6	3

Second round
14	(Switzerland) Rebeka Masarova	5	4
(Serbia) Nina Stojanović	7	6
WC	(Slovakia) Renáta Jamrichová	5	1
(Chinese Taipei) Joanna Garland	7	6

Qualifying competition
(Serbia) Nina Stojanović	7^{7}	7
(Chinese Taipei) Joanna Garland	6^{5}	5

=== Fifteenth qualifier ===
First round
15	(France) Elsa Jacquemot	6	6
(Romania) Miriam Bulgaru	2	2
(China) Gao Xinyu	3	5
(Australia) Arina Rodionova	6	7
PR	(France) Alizé Cornet	6	6
WC	(United Kingdom) Katy Dunne	4	3
(Italy) Nuria Brancaccio	4	6	3
29	(Andorra) Victoria Jiménez Kasintseva	6	2	6

Second round
15	(France) Elsa Jacquemot	6	6
(Australia) Arina Rodionova	2	3
PR	(France) Alizé Cornet	3	6	6
29	(Andorra) Victoria Jiménez Kasintseva	6	3	3

Qualifying competition
15	(France) Elsa Jacquemot	7	6
PR	(France) Alizé Cornet	5	1

=== Sixteenth qualifier ===
First round
16	(United States) Robin Montgomery	7^{8}	6^{3}	6
(Belgium) Hanne Vandewinkel	6^{6}	7^{7}	3
(Romania) Patricia Maria Țig	4	7^{7}	6
(Canada) Kayla Cross	6	6^{4}	4
PR	(Slovenia) Kaja Juvan	6	6
(Japan) Kyōka Okamura	2	2
(Netherlands) Anouk Koevermans	6	6
28	(France) Jessika Ponchet	4	4

Second round
16	(United States) Robin Montgomery	6	6
(Romania) Patricia Maria Țig	4	2
PR	(Slovenia) Kaja Juvan	6	6
(Netherlands) Anouk Koevermans	2	0

Qualifying competition
16	(United States) Robin Montgomery	3	6^{7}
PR	(Slovenia) Kaja Juvan	6	7^{9}
