= Oskari Paldanius =

Finnish tennis player (born 2007)

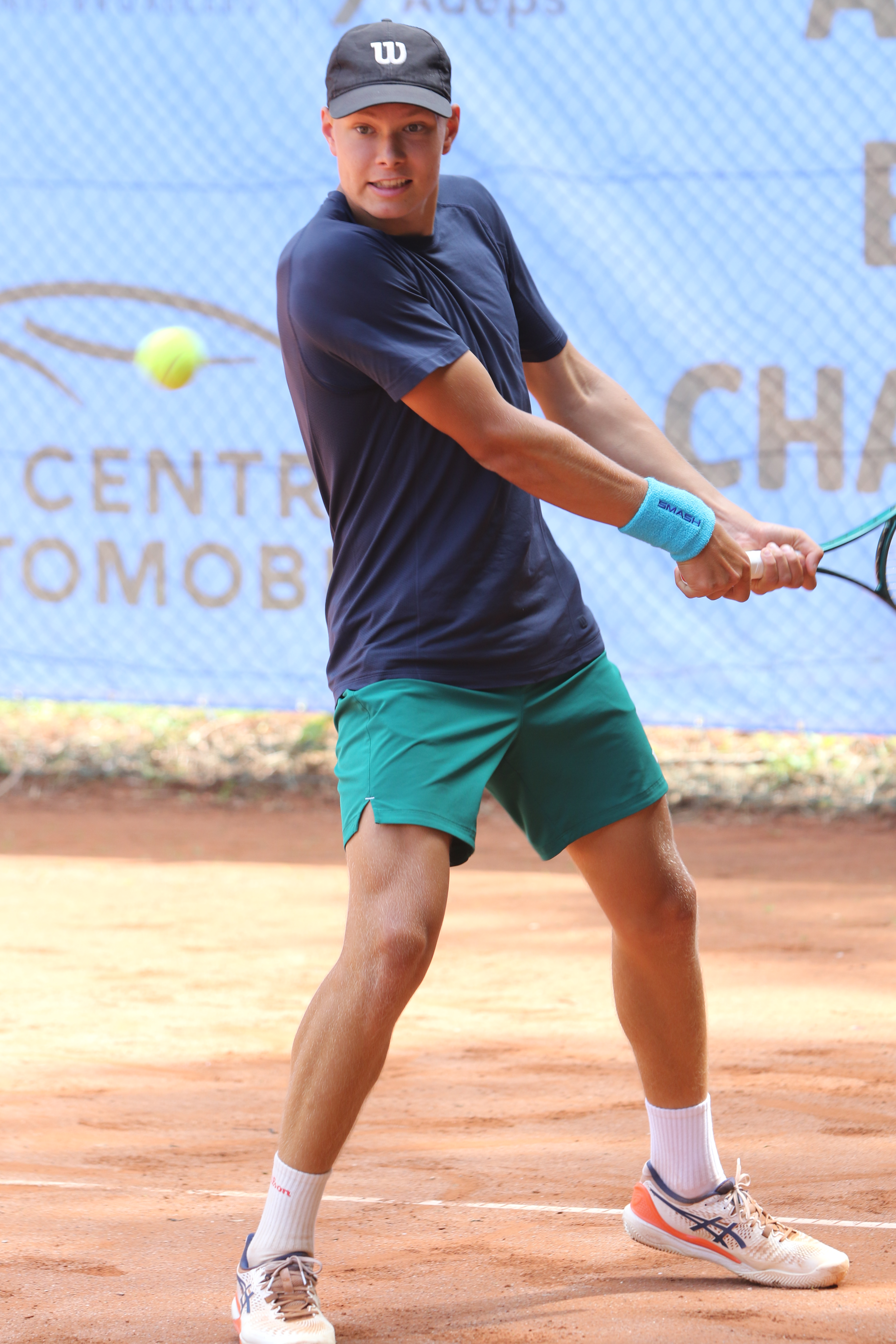
- Astrid Bowl, 25 May 2024
- Country (sports): Finland
- Born: 11 June 2007 (age 19) Laupheim, Germany
- Height: 1.85 m (6 ft 1 in)
- Plays: Right-handed (two-handed backhand)
- Coach: Kim Tiilikainen, Pasi Kinnunen
- Prize money: US $30,075

Singles
- Career record: 0–0 (at ATP Tour level, Grand Slam level, and in Davis Cup)
- Career titles: 0
- Highest ranking: No. 610 (16 November 2026)
- Current ranking: No. 610 (16 November 2026)

Grand Slam singles results
- Australian Open Junior: SF (2025)
- French Open Junior: 1R (2025)
- Wimbledon Junior: 3R (2025)
- US Open Junior: 3R (2025)

Doubles
- Career record: 0–0 (at ATP Tour level, Grand Slam level, and in Davis Cup)
- Career titles: 0
- Highest ranking: No. 679 (9 November 2026)
- Current ranking: No. 686 (16 November 2026)

Grand Slam doubles results
- Australian Open Junior: 1R (2025)
- French Open Junior: W (2025)
- Wimbledon Junior: W (2025)
- US Open Junior: 1R (2024, 2025)
- Last updated on: 16 November 2026.

Oskari Paldanius (born 11 June 2007) is a Finnish tennis player. He has a career-high ATP singles ranking of No. 610 achieved on 16 November 2026 and a doubles ranking of No. 679 achieved on 9 November 2026.

Partnering with Alan Ważny, he won two major jr. doubles titles at 2025 French Open and 2025 Wimbledon Championships.

== Early life ==
Paldanius was born in Laupheim, Germany, to Finnish parents who were working abroad at the time.

== Career ==
Paldanius is a member of Smash Club in Helsinki. He won his first match at a junior Grand Slam in the boys' singles at the 2024 US Open, before losing to Mees Rottgering. He reached the semi-finals of the boys' singles at the 2025 Australian Open, where he lost to eventual winner Henry Bernet. With that run, he rose to fifth in the junior world rankings. Shortly afterwards, he was called into the Finland Davis Cup team.

He won the 2025 French Open in the boys' doubles alongside Alan Ważny of Poland, reaching the semi-finals after a straight sets win against Thijs Boogaard and Ivan Ivanov, before beating Keaton Hance and Jack Kennedy of the United States in the semi-finals, and then another American pairing of Noah Johnston and Benjamin Willwerth in straight sets in the final.

== ITF World Tennis Tour finals ==
=== Singles: 3 (2–1) ===
Legend ITF WTT (2–1)

Result	W–L	Date	Tournament	Tier	Surface	Opponent	Score
Loss	0–1	Mar 2025	M15 Sharm El Sheikh, Egypt	WTT	Hard	(Slovakia) Michal Krajčí	3–6, 7–6^{(7–5)}, 4–6
Win	1–1	Aug 2026	M15 Turku, Finland	WTT	Hard	(Israel) Amit Vales	3–6, 7–5, 6–4
Win	2–1	Oct 2026	M15 Sharm El Sheikh, Egypt	WTT	Hard	(Belgium) Romain Faucon	6–3, 6–4

=== Doubles: 3 (2 titles, 1 runner-up) ===
Legend ITF WTT (2–1)	Finals by surface Hard (2–1) Clay (0–0)

Result	W–L	Date	Tournament	Tier	Surface	Partner	Opponents	Score
Loss	0–1	Oct 2024	M15 Sëlva Gardena, Italy	WTT	Hard (i)	(Italy) Leonardo Cattaneo	(Italy) Pietro Orlando Fellin (Italy) Christian Fellin	4–6, 6–4, [7–10]
Win	1–1	Feb 2025	M15 Villena, Spain	WTT	Hard	(Hungary) Adam Jilly	(Spain) Alex Martínez (Spain) Iñaki Montes de la Torre	walkover
Win	2–1	Mar 2025	M15 Sharm El Sheikh, Egypt	WTT	Hard	(Italy) Giovanni Oradini	(Egypt) Amr Elsayed (Austria) Nico Hipfl	6–4, 7–6^{(7–4)}

== Junior Grand Slam finals ==
=== Doubles: 2 (2 titles) ===
Result	Year	Tournament	Surface	Partner	Opponents	Score
Win	2025	French Open	Clay	(Poland) Alan Ważny	(United States) Noah Johnston (United States) Benjamin Willwerth	6–2, 6–3
Win	2025	Wimbledon	Grass	(Poland) Alan Ważny	(United Kingdom) Oliver Bonding (United States) Jagger Leach	5–7, 7–6^{(8–6)}, [10–5]
