= Julieta Pareja =

American tennis player (born 2009)

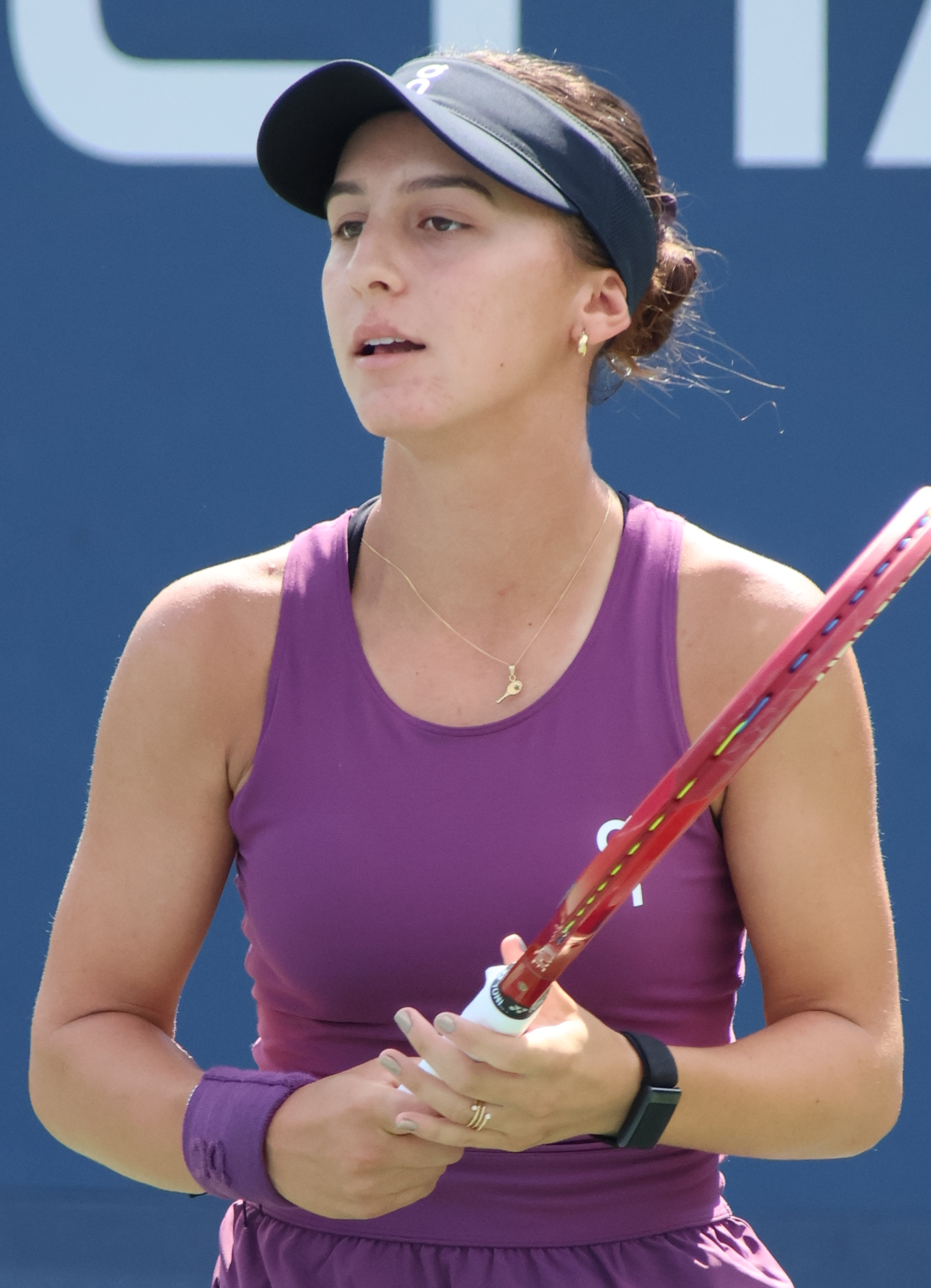
- Pareja at the 2026 US Open
- Country (sports): United States
- Born: February 18, 2009 (age 17) Carlsbad, California, US
- Plays: Right (two-handed backhand)
- Coach: Adam Peterson; Agustín Velotti
- Prize money: $365,388

Singles
- Career record: 65–30
- Career titles: 3 ITF
- Highest ranking: No. 202 (November 2, 2026)
- Current ranking: No. 202 (November 2, 2026)

Grand Slam singles results
- US Open: 1R (2025)

Doubles
- Career record: 4–9
- Highest ranking: No. 1,469 (September 8, 2025)
- Current ranking: No. 1,496 (November 2, 2026)

Grand Slam doubles results
- US Open: 1R (2025, 2026)
- Last updated on: November 2, 2026.

Julieta Pareja (born February 18, 2009) is an American tennis player. She has a career-high combined ITF junior ranking of No. 7, achieved on June 9, 2025. She also has career-high WTA ranking of No. 269 in singles, achieved on March 30.

== Early life ==
Pareja was born in Carlsbad, California, to father Pablo and mother Adriana. She is of Colombian descent; her father is a second-generation American who was born to a Colombian immigrant father, while her mother is originally from Bogotá. Her older sisters, Raquel and Antonia, are also tennis players.

== Career ==
=== Juniors ===
In July 2024, Pareja won back-to-back titles at the J100 Copa Ciudad and the J200 Copa Liga de Tenis de Bogotá. Later that year, she represented the United States at the Junior Billie Jean King Cup and won the tournament with Tyra Caterina Grant and Kristina Penickova.

In January 2025, she won the J300 Copa Barranquilla, defeating compatriot Ishika Ashar in the final. She later won the J300 Fila International Junior Championships in Indian Wells and reached the final of the J500 Trofeo Bonfiglio. In June, she reached both the girls' singles and doubles quarterfinals of the French Open and won the J300 Lexus British Open in Roehampton. The following month, she reached both the girls' singles and doubles finals of Wimbledon.

=== Professional ===
In June 2024, Pareja won her first professional title at the W15 SoCal Pro Series event in Rancho Santa Fe, becoming the youngest player to win a SoCal Pro Series women's singles title. That August, she received a wildcard into the qualifying competition of the US Open, where she reached the third round.

In March 2025, she received a wildcard into the qualifying competition of the Indian Wells Open. Later that month, she qualified for her first WTA Tour main draw at the Copa Colsanitas, becoming the first player born in 2009 to compete in a main draw and win a match at this level. On her debut, she reached her first WTA Tour semifinal with wins over wildcard entrant María José Sánchez Uribe, lucky loser Patricia Maria Țig, and Léolia Jeanjean, becoming the youngest WTA Tour semifinalist since Coco Gauff in 2019. Later that year, Pareja was given a wildcard entry to make her major debut at the US Open, but lost to ninth seed Elena Rybakina in the first round.

== Endorsements ==
In June 2025, Pareja signed with On, becoming the first American female tennis player to sign with the brand.

== Performance timelines ==
Key
W	F	SF	QF	#R	RR	Q#	DNQ	A	NH

(W) winner; (F) finalist; (SF) semifinalist; (QF) quarterfinalist; (#R) rounds 4, 3, 2, 1; (RR) round-robin stage; (Q#) qualification round; (DNQ) did not qualify; (A) absent; (NH) not held; (SR) strike rate (events won / competed); (W–L) win–loss record.
To avoid confusion and double counting, these charts are updated at the conclusion of a tournament or when the player's participation has ended.

== ITF Circuit finals ==
=== Singles: 5 (3 titles, 2 runner-ups) ===
Legend W100 tournaments (0–1) W50 tournaments (2–0) W35 tournaments (0–1) W15 tournaments (1–0)	Finals by surface Hard (2–2) Clay (1–0)

Result	W–L	Date	Tournament	Tier	Surface	Opponent	Score
Win	1–0	Jun 2024	ITF Rancho Santa Fe, United States	W15	Hard	(United States) Kimmi Hance	5–7, 6–1, 6–4
Loss	1–1	Oct 2024	ITF Bakersfield, United States	W35	Hard	(United States) Amelia Honer	4–6, 3–6
Win	2–1	Mar 2026	ITF Chihuahua, Mexico	W50	Clay	(Canada) Kayla Cross	6–3, 7–6^{(5)}
Win	3–1	Jul 2026	ITF Columbus, United States	W50	Hard (i)	(Japan) Sakura Hosogi	6–3, 6–3
Loss	3–2	Nov 2026	Tyler Pro Challenge, United States	W100	Hard	(United States) Caroline Dolehide	4–6, 3–6

== Junior Grand Slam finals ==
=== Singles: 1 (runner-up) ===
Result	Year	Tournament	Surface	Opponent	Score
Loss	2025	Wimbledon	Grass	(Slovakia) Mia Pohánková	3–6, 1–6

=== Doubles: 1 (runner-up) ===
Result	Year	Tournament	Surface	Partner	Opponents	Score
Loss	2025	Wimbledon	Grass	(United States) Thea Frodin	(United States) Kristina Penickova (Czech Republic) Vendula Valdmannová	4–6, 2–6
