= Mia Pohánková =

Slovak tennis player (born 2008)

- Pohánková at the 2026 Wimbledon Championships
- Country (sports): Slovakia
- Born: 21 October 2008 (age 18) Levice, Slovakia
- Plays: Right-handed (two-handed backhand)
- Coach: Róbert Gašparetz
- Prize money: US$153,308

Singles
- Career record: 49–23
- Career titles: 2 ITF
- Highest ranking: No. 119 (2 November 2026)
- Current ranking: No. 119 (2 November 2026)

Grand Slam singles results
- Wimbledon: Q1 (2026)
- Australian Open Junior: SF (2025)
- French Open Junior: 3R (2025)
- Wimbledon Junior: W (2025)
- US Open Junior: QF (2025)

Doubles
- Career record: 3–4
- Highest ranking: No. 951 (6 November 2023)

Grand Slam doubles results
- Australian Open Junior: 2R (2025)
- French Open Junior: SF (2025)
- Wimbledon Junior: 2R (2025)
- US Open Junior: 2R (2025)

Team competitions
- Fed Cup: (Singles: 3–1; Doubles: 1–0)
- Last updated on: 30 October 2026.

Mia Pohánková (born 21 October 2008) is a Slovak professional tennis player. She won the girls' singles title at the 2025 Wimbledon Championships. She has a career high WTA singles ranking of No. 119, achieved on 2 November 2026, and a career high WTA doubles ranking of No. 951, achieved on 6 November 2023.

== Career ==
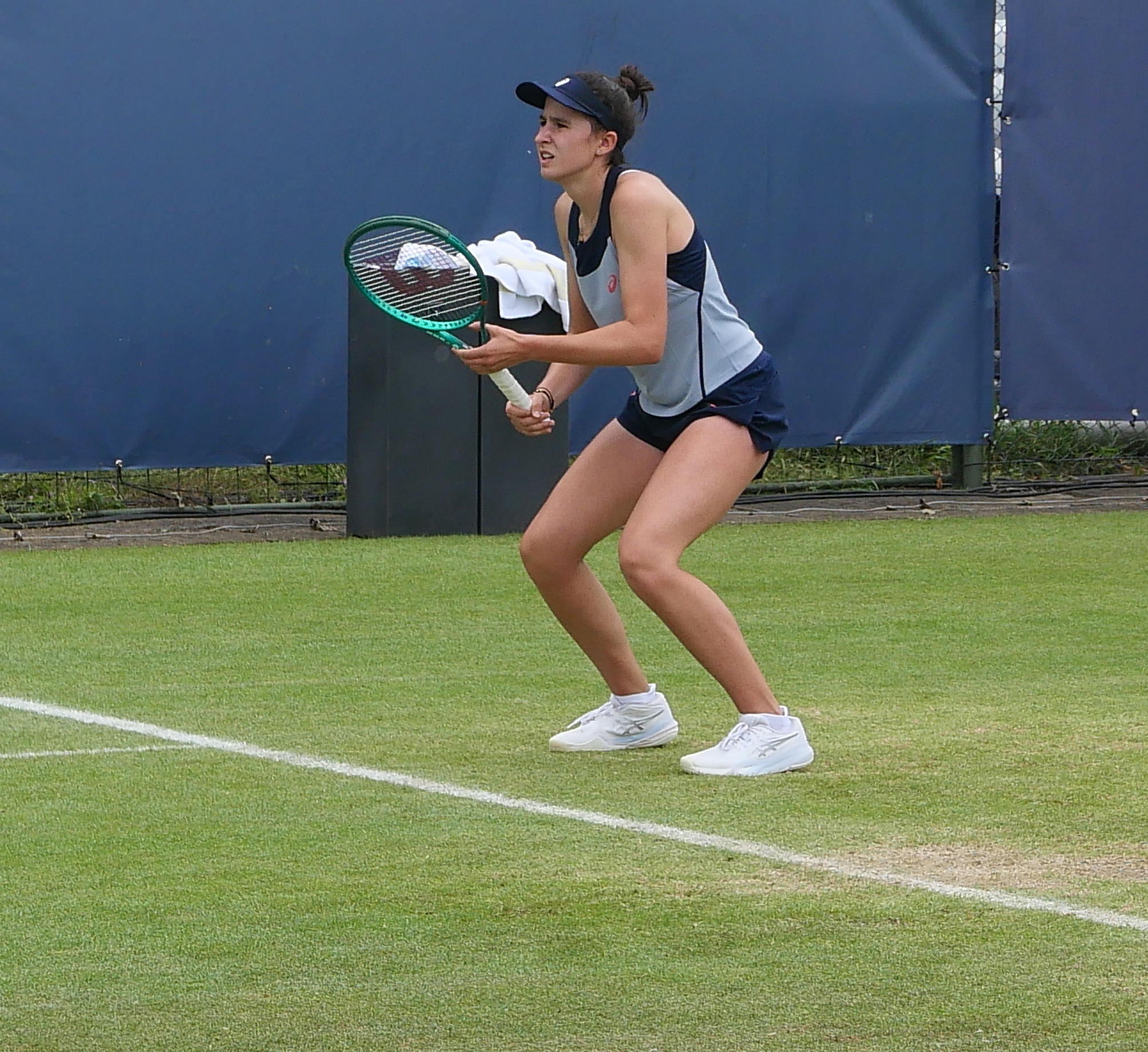
Pohánková at the 2026 Libéma Open

Having started playing tennis at the age of four, Pohánková was 15 when she won her first ITF title in October 2024 at the W75 Slovak Open in Bratislava. She defeated compatriot Renáta Jamrichová in the final. Pohánková played in the Billie Jean King Cup in April 2025, partnering with Tereza Mihalíková in a 3–0 win against American pairing Desirae Krawczyk and Asia Muhammad, with Muhammad retiring ill, presenting the Slovak team with a point from the match.

Unseeded, she won the girls' singles title at the 2025 Wimbledon Championships, defeating sixth seed Julieta Pareja in the final in three sets.

Pohánková made her WTA Tour debut as a wildcard entrant at the 2025 Chennai Open, starting with a world ranking of 659. In the first round she defeated Nao Hibino in straight sets, serving 8 aces to advance to the next round. In the last 16 she beat French ninth seed Diane Parry in straight sets to reach the quarterfinals; after her opponent won the first three games of the match, Pohánková reeled off eight games in a row to lead 6–3, 2–0, before winning the second set 6–4. In the quarterfinals she faced Indonesian fourth seed Janice Tjen, who eliminated Pohánková in straight sets, 6–3, 6–1.

Pohánková reached third round at the 2026 Wuhan Open, her first WTA 1000 event. As a wildcard entrant, she defeated lucky loser Anna Bondár and another wildcard Wang Xiyu,before losing to Maria Sakkari.

== ITF Circuit finals ==
=== Singles: 3 (2 titles, 1 runner-up) ===
Legend W100 tournaments (0–1) W60/75 tournaments (2–0)	Finals by surface Hard (2–0) Clay (0–1)

Result	W–L	Date	Tournament	Tier	Surface	Opponent	Score
Win	1–0	Oct 2024	Slovak Open, Slovakia	W75	Hard (i)	(Slovakia) Renáta Jamrichová	2–6, 6–4, 6–2
Win	2–0	Jan 2026	Leszno, Poland	W75+H	Hard (i)	Julia Avdeeva	6–3, 6–2
Loss	2–1	Apr 2026	Wiesbaden Open, Germany	W100	Clay	(Germany) Noma Noha Akugue	2–6, 6–7^{(3)}

== Junior Grand Slam finals ==
=== Singles: 1 (1 title) ===
Result	Year	Tournament	Surface	Opponent	Score
Win	2025	Wimbledon	Grass	(United States) Julieta Pareja	6–3, 6–1
