= 2025 Wimbledon Championships – Girls' singles =

Tennis championship

Girls' singles
- 2025 Wimbledon Championships

Final
- Champion: (Slovakia) Mia Pohánková
- Runner-up: (United States) Julieta Pareja
- Score: 6−3, 6−1

Details
- Draw: 64 (8 Q)
- Seeds: 16

Events
Singles	men	women		boys	girls
Doubles	men	women	mixed	boys	girls
WC Singles	men	women	quad
WC Doubles	men	women	quad
14&U Singles	boys	girls
Legends	men	women	mixed
- Wimbledon Championships

Mia Pohánková won the girls' singles title at the 2025 Wimbledon Championships, defeating Julieta Pareja in the final, 6–3, 6–1.

Renáta Jamrichová was the defending champion, but chose not to compete this year. She received a wildcard into the women's singles qualifying competition, where she lost in the second round to Joanna Garland.

== Seeds ==
1. (Australia) Emerson Jones (quarterfinals)
2. (United Kingdom) Hannah Klugman (quarterfinals)
3. (Austria) Lilli Tagger (quarterfinals)
4. (United States) Kristina Penickova (second round)
5. (Serbia) Teodora Kostović (quarterfinals)
6. (United States) Julieta Pareja (final)
7. (United Kingdom) Mika Stojsavljevic (first round)
8. (Serbia) Luna Vujović (first round)
9. (Czech Republic) Jana Kovačková (second round)
10. (Germany) Julia Stusek (second round)
11. (Belgium) Jeline Vandromme (first round)
12. (Czech Republic) Alena Kovačková (second round)
13. (Spain) Charo Esquiva Bañuls (third round)
14. (Argentina) Luna María Cinalli (second round)
15. (China) Zhang Ruien (second round)
16. (Bulgaria) Rositsa Dencheva (second round)

Click on the seed number of a player to go to their draw section.

== Draw ==
Key

- Q = Qualifier
- WC = Wild card
- LL = Lucky loser
- Alt = Alternate
- ITF = ITF entry
- PR = Protected ranking
- SR = Special ranking
- SE = Special exempt
- JE = Junior exempt
- JR = Junior Accelerator Programme entrant
- CO = College Accelerator Programme entrant
- NG = Next Gen Accelerator Program entrant
- w/o = Walkover
- r = Retired
- d = Defaulted

=== Finals ===
Quarterfinals
1	(Australia) Emerson Jones	2	2
(Slovakia) Mia Pohánková	6	6
(Czech Republic) Vendula Valdmannová	6	4	7
5	(Serbia) Teodora Kostović	2	6	5
(United Kingdom) Mimi Xu	7^{7}	6
3	(Austria) Lilli Tagger	6^{4}	1
6	(United States) Julieta Pareja	6	6
2	(United Kingdom) Hannah Klugman	4	2

Semifinals
(Slovakia) Mia Pohánková	6	6
(Czech Republic) Vendula Valdmannová	4	0
(United Kingdom) Mimi Xu	2	7^{9}	4
6	(United States) Julieta Pareja	6	6^{7}	6

Final
(Slovakia) Mia Pohánková	6	6
6	(United States) Julieta Pareja	3	1

=== Top half ===
==== Section 1 ====
First round
1	(Australia) Emerson Jones	6	6
(Czech Republic) Julie Paštiková	2	3
(Bulgaria) Yoana Konstantinova	2	7	6
(United States) Aspen Schuman	6	5	3
WC	(United Kingdom) Megan Knight	2	3
Q	(Spain) Eugenia Zozaya Menéndez	6	6
(Israel) Mika Buchnik	5	6^{6}
15	(China) Zhang Ruien	7	7^{8}
9	(Czech Republic) Jana Kovačková	6	6
WC	(United Kingdom) Allegra Korpanec Davies	1	3
(Brazil) Nauhany Vitória Leme da Silva	5	7^{7}	6
(United States) Maya Iyengar	7	6^{1}	0
(Germany) Sonja Zhenikhova	3	1
(France) Ksenia Efremova	6	6
(Slovakia) Mia Pohánková	7^{7}	6
7	(United Kingdom) Mika Stojsavljevic	6^{4}	1

Second round
1	(Australia) E Jones	6	6
(Bulgaria) Y Konstantinova	2	1
Q	(Spain) E Zozaya Menéndez	3	6	7^{10}
15	(China) R Zhang	6	4	6^{8}
9	(Czech Republic) J Kovačková	3	6	3
(Brazil) NV Leme da Silva	6	0	6
(France) K Efremova	3	6^{5}
(Slovakia) M Pohánková	6	7^{7}

Third round
1	(Australia) E Jones	6	6
Q	(Spain) E Zozaya Menéndez	4	4
(Brazil) NV Leme da Silva	3	7	3
(Slovakia) M Pohánková	6	5	6

Quarterfinals
1	(Australia) E Jones	2	2
(Slovakia) M Pohánková	6	6

==== Section 2 ====
First round
4	(United States) Kristina Penickova	6	6
(Sweden) Nellie Taraba Wallberg	3	0
(Lithuania) Laima Vladson	6	3	6
(Germany) Eva Bennemann	3	6	2
(Czech Republic) Vendula Valdmannová	7	6
WC	(United Kingdom) Daniela Piani	5	4
(Romania) Giulia Safina Popa	4	2
14	(Argentina) Luna María Cinalli	6	6
11	(Belgium) Jeline Vandromme	2	6	6^{8}
(Spain) Neus Torner Sensano	6	3	7^{10}
WC	(United Kingdom) Brooke Black	6	4	2
Q	(Japan) Kanon Sawashiro	2	6	6
(Turkey) Denız Dilek	5	6	4
(China) Wang Yuhan	7	1	6
Q	(Germany) Victoria Pohle	6^{6}	3
5	(Serbia) Teodora Kostović	7^{8}	6

Second round
4	(United States) K Penickova	6	6^{5}	3
(Lithuania) L Vladson	3	7^{7}	6
(Czech Republic) V Valdmannová	6	6
14	(Argentina) LM Cinalli	3	2
(Spain) N Torner Sensano	2	6^{3}
Q	(Japan) K Sawashiro	6	7^{7}
(China) Y Wang	2	6^{7}
5	(Serbia) T Kostović	6	7^{9}

Third round
(Lithuania) L Vladson	0	2
(Czech Republic) V Valdmannová	6	6
Q	(Japan) K Sawashiro	3	1
5	(Serbia) T Kostović	6	6

Quarterfinals
(Czech Republic) V Valdmannová	6	4	7
5	(Serbia) T Kostović	2	6	5

=== Bottom half ===
==== Section 3 ====
First round
8	(Serbia) Luna Vujović	3	6	6^{6}
WC	(United Kingdom) Daniella Britton	6	3	7^{10}
(Australia) Tahlia Kokkinis	6	6
Q	(China) Qu Yihan	4	4
(United States) Thea Frodin	6	4	5
(United Kingdom) Mimi Xu	2	6	7
(Canada) Nadia Lagaev	4	5
12	(Czech Republic) Alena Kovačková	6	7
16	(Bulgaria) Rositsa Dencheva	6	6
(Brazil) Victoria Luiza Barros	4	4
Q	(United States) Leena Friedman	1	4
WC	(United Kingdom) Ruby Cooling	6	6
Q	(Sweden) Lea Nilsson	6	6
Q	(United Kingdom) Hephzibah Oluwadare	2	2
(China) Sun Xinran	2	5
3	(Austria) Lilli Tagger	6	7

Second round
WC	(United Kingdom) D Britton	3	6^{2}
(Australia) T Kokkinis	6	7^{7}
(United Kingdom) M Xu	6	6
12	(Czech Republic) A Kovačková	1	2
16	(Bulgaria) R Dencheva	7	4	4
WC	(United Kingdom) R Cooling	5	6	6
Q	(Sweden) L Nilsson	6^{5}	6^{4}
3	(Austria) L Tagger	7^{7}	7^{7}

Third round
(Australia) T Kokkinis	3	3
(United Kingdom) M Xu	6	6
WC	(United Kingdom) R Cooling	3	2
3	(Austria) L Tagger	6	6

Quarterfinals
(United Kingdom) M Xu	7^{7}	6
3	(Austria) L Tagger	6^{4}	1

==== Section 4 ====
First round
6	(United States) Julieta Pareja	6	6
Q	(Romania) Maia Ilinca Burcescu	2	3
WC	(United Kingdom) Flora Johnson	6	6
(Czech Republic) Sarah Melany Fajmonová	3	1
(Bulgaria) Elizara Yaneva	6	6
(Latvia) Beatrise Zeltiņa	4	1
(Japan) Reina Goto	1	4
10	(Germany) Julia Stusek	6	6
13	(Spain) Charo Esquiva Bañuls	6	6
WC	(United Kingdom) Hollie Smart	3	3
(China) Shao Yushan	6	6
(Slovakia) Kali Šupová	3	4
(Romania) Diana-Ioana Simionescu	6^{3}	0
(Serbia) Anastasija Cvetković	7^{7}	6
(Argentina) Sol Ailin Larraya Guidi	4	0
2	(United Kingdom) Hannah Klugman	6	6

Second round
6	(United States) J Pareja	6	6
WC	(United Kingdom) F Johnson	2	2
(Bulgaria) E Yaneva	5	6	6
10	(Germany) J Stusek	7	3	2
13	(Spain) C Esquiva Bañuls	6	7^{7}
(China) Y Shao	2	6^{5}
(Serbia) A Cvetković	7	2	2
2	(United Kingdom) H Klugman	5	6	6

Third round
6	(United States) J Pareja	6	6
(Bulgaria) E Yaneva	2	2
13	(Spain) C Esquiva Bañuls	4	3
2	(United Kingdom) H Klugman	6	6

Quarterfinals
6	(United States) J Pareja	6	6
2	(United Kingdom) H Klugman	4	2

== Qualifying ==
=== Seeds ===
1. (India) Maaya Rajeshwaran (qualifying competition)
2. (Romania) Maia Ilinca Burcescu (qualified)
3. (China) Qu Yihan (qualified)
4. (Spain) Lorena Solar Donoso (qualifying competition)
5. (Germany) Victoria Pohle (qualified)
6. (Australia) Renee Alame (qualifying competition)
7. (United States) Leena Friedman (qualified)
8. (United States) Capucine Jauffret (qualifying competition)
9. (Thailand) Kamonwan Yodpetch (qualifying competition)
10. (Japan) Kanon Sawashiro (qualified)
11. (United States) Ishika Ashar (first round)
12. (Spain) Eugenia Zozaya Menéndez (qualified)
13. (Czech Republic) Amelie Justine Hejtmanek (first round)
14. (Sweden) Lea Nilsson (qualified)
15. (Czech Republic) Tereza Hermanová (qualifying competition)
16. (Poland) Maja Pawelska (qualifying competition)

=== Qualifiers ===
1. (Spain) Eugenia Zozaya Menéndez
2. (Romania) Maia Ilinca Burcescu
3. (China) Qu Yihan
4. (United Kingdom) Hephzibah Oluwadare
5. (Germany) Victoria Pohle
6. (Japan) Kanon Sawashiro
7. (United States) Leena Friedman
8. (Sweden) Lea Nilsson

=== Qualifying draw ===
==== First qualifier ====
First round
1	(India) Maaya Rajeshwaran	4	7^{7}	[10]
(China) Ye Shiyu	6	6^{5}	[8]
WC	(United Kingdom) Tegan Bush	2	3
12	(Spain) Eugenia Zozaya Menéndez	6	6

Qualifying competition
1	(India) Maaya Rajeshwaran	6	3	[5]
12	(Spain) Eugenia Zozaya Menéndez	3	6	[10]

==== Second qualifier ====
First round
2	(Romania) Maia Ilinca Burcescu	7^{10}	6
(United Kingdom) Freya Peet	6^{8}	4
(Sweden) Iva Marinkovic	6	7
11	(United States) Ishika Ashar	4	5

Qualifying competition
2	(Romania) Maia Ilinca Burcescu	6	6
(Sweden) Iva Marinkovic	0	2

==== Third qualifier ====
First round
3	(China) Qu Yihan	6	7^{7}
(Italy) Carla Giambelli	2	6^{3}
WC	(United Kingdom) Sophia Christodoulou	4	6	[5]
9	(Thailand) Kamonwan Yodpetch	6	2	[10]

Qualifying competition
3	(China) Qu Yihan	6	7^{8}
9	(Thailand) Kamonwan Yodpetch	4	6^{6}

==== Fourth qualifier ====
First round
4	(Spain) Lorena Solar Donoso	6	6
(Germany) Michelle Khomich	3	3
WC	(United Kingdom) Hephzibah Oluwadare	6	6
13	(Czech Republic) Amelie Justine Hejtmanek	3	3

Qualifying competition
4	(Spain) Lorena Solar Donoso	6^{4}	1
WC	(United Kingdom) Hephzibah Oluwadare	7^{7}	6

==== Fifth qualifier ====
First round
5	(Germany) Victoria Pohle	6	6
(Ukraine) Anastasiia Sorska	1	0
WC	(United Kingdom) Mia Wainwright	3	6	[8]
15	(Czech Republic) Tereza Hermanová	6	4	[10]

Qualifying competition
5	(Germany) Victoria Pohle	6	6
15	(Czech Republic) Tereza Hermanová	3	3

==== Sixth qualifier ====
First round
6	(Australia) Renee Alame	6	7
WC	(United Kingdom) Edie Griffiths	3	5
(Czech Republic) Amy Suchá	6	3	[4]
10	(Japan) Kanon Sawashiro	3	6	[10]

Qualifying competition
6	(Australia) Renee Alame	3	6^{4}
10	(Japan) Kanon Sawashiro	6	7^{7}

==== Seventh qualifier ====
First round
7	(United States) Leena Friedman	6	6
(Slovakia) Yasmin Vavrová	3	2
WC	(United Kingdom) Sophie Bekker	2	3
16	(Poland) Maja Pawelska	6	6

Qualifying competition
7	(United States) Leena Friedman	6	7
16	(Poland) Maja Pawelska	4	5

==== Eighth qualifier ====
First round
8	(United States) Capucine Jauffret	6	1
(Croatia) Dora Mišković	4	0^{r}
(Czech Republic) Denisa Žoldáková	2	2
14	(Sweden) Lea Nilsson	6	6

Qualifying competition
8	(United States) Capucine Jauffret	6	2	[9]
14	(Sweden) Lea Nilsson	2	6	[11]
