= 2025 Wimbledon Championships – Boys' singles =

Tennis championship

Boys' singles
- 2025 Wimbledon Championships

Final
- Champion: (Bulgaria) Ivan Ivanov
- Runner-up: (United States) Ronit Karki
- Score: 6–2, 6–3

Details
- Draw: 64 (8Q / 8WC)
- Seeds: 16

Events
Singles	men	women		boys	girls
Doubles	men	women	mixed	boys	girls
WC Singles	men	women	quad
WC Doubles	men	women	quad
14&U Singles	boys	girls
Legends	men	women	mixed
- Wimbledon Championships

Ivan Ivanov won the title, defeating Ronit Karki in the final, 6–2, 6–3. Ivanov became the first Bulgarian player to win a junior boys' major title since Grigor Dimitrov in 2008. He did not lose a set en route to the title.

Nicolai Budkov Kjær was the defending champion, but was no longer eligible to compete in junior events. He received a wildcard into the men's singles qualifying competition, where he lost in the second round to Adrian Mannarino.

== Seeds ==
1. (Spain) Andrés Santamarta Roig (second round)
2. (Italy) Jacopo Vasamì (third round)
3. (Netherlands) Mees Röttgering (third round)
4. (United States) Jagger Leach (second round)
5. (Germany) Niels McDonald (second round)
6. (Bulgaria) Ivan Ivanov (champion)
7. (United States) Benjamin Willwerth (quarterfinals)
8. (United States) Jack Kennedy (third round)
9. (Romania) Yannick Theodor Alexandrescou (second round)
10. (Japan) Ryo Tabata (first round)
11. (Finland) Oskari Paldanius (third round)
12. (Bulgaria) Alexander Vasilev (semifinals)
13. (Germany) Max Schönhaus (semifinals)
14. (Poland) Alan Ważny (quarterfinals)
15. Timofei Derepasko (third round)
16. (Kazakhstan) Amir Omarkhanov (first round)

Click on the seed number of a player to go to their draw section.

== Draw ==
Key

- Q = Qualifier
- WC = Wild card
- LL = Lucky loser
- Alt = Alternate
- ITF = ITF entry
- PR = Protected ranking
- SR = Special ranking
- SE = Special exempt
- JE = Junior exempt
- JR = Junior Accelerator Programme entrant
- CO = College Accelerator Programme entrant
- NG = Next Gen Accelerator Program entrant
- w/o = Walkover
- r = Retired
- d = Defaulted

=== Finals ===
Quarterfinals
(Slovenia) Žiga Šeško	3	6^{4}
6	(Bulgaria) Ivan Ivanov	6	7^{7}
13	(Germany) Max Schönhaus	7^{7}	6
7	(United States) Benjamin Willwerth	6^{2}	3
12	(Bulgaria) Alexander Vasilev	6	5	6
(Netherlands) Thijs Boogaard	4	7	3
Q	(United States) Ronit Karki	3	6	6
14	(Poland) Alan Ważny	6	3	4

Semifinals
6	(Bulgaria) Ivan Ivanov	7^{9}	7^{7}
13	(Germany) Max Schönhaus	6^{7}	6^{5}
12	(Bulgaria) Alexander Vasilev	7	4	1
Q	(United States) Ronit Karki	5	6	6

Final
6	(Bulgaria) Ivan Ivanov	6	6
Q	(United States) Ronit Karki	2	3

=== Top half ===
==== Section 1 ====
First round
1	(Spain) Andrés Santamarta Roig	6	6
WC	(United Kingdom) Conor Brady	2	2
(United States) Maximus Dussault	4	2
(Slovenia) Žiga Šeško	6	6
Q	(United States) Gavin Goode	6	6^{4}	6
(Sweden) Ludvig Fredrik Hede	2	7^{7}	1
(Ukraine) Nikita Bilozertsev	6	6
16	(Kazakhstan) Amir Omarkhanov	4	2
10	(Japan) Ryo Tabata	2	4
(United States) Jack Secord	6	6
WC	(United Kingdom) Benjamin Gusic-Wan	6	1	6
(Italy) Pierluigi Basile	2	6	2
(Argentina) Dante Pagani	3	4
Egor Pleshivtsev	6	6
(United States) Jack Satterfield	1	2
6	(Bulgaria) Ivan Ivanov	6	6

Second round
1	(Spain) A Santamarta Roig	4	6	4
(Slovenia) Ž Šeško	6	3	6
Q	(United States) G Goode	1	4
(Ukraine) N Bilozertsev	6	6
(United States) J Secord	6	4	6
WC	(United Kingdom) B Gusic-Wan	3	6	4
E Pleshivtsev	6^{6}	2
6	(Bulgaria) I Ivanov	7^{8}	6

Third round
(Slovenia) Ž Šeško	7^{7}	6
(Ukraine) N Bilozertsev	6^{2}	2
(United States) J Secord	3	2
6	(Bulgaria) I Ivanov	6	6

Quarterfinals
(Slovenia) Ž Šeško	3	6^{4}
6	(Bulgaria) I Ivanov	6	7^{7}

==== Section 2 ====
First round
3	(Netherlands) Mees Röttgering	6	6
Q	(Turkey) Haydar Cem Gökpınar	1	0
(United States) Maxwell Exsted	7	4	6
WC	(United Kingdom) Rhys Lawlor	5	6	0
Q	(South Africa) Connor Doig	5	2
(Brazil) Luis Guto Miguel	7	6
(United States) Ryan Cozad	6	4	1
13	(Germany) Max Schönhaus	3	6	6
11	(Finland) Oskari Paldanius	6	6
(Romania) Ștefan Horia Haita	3	3
Savva Rybkin	1	2
(Australia) Cruz Hewitt	6	6
WC	(United Kingdom) Eric Lorimer	2	4
(Puerto Rico) Yannik Álvarez	6	6
Q	(Italy) Gabriele Crivellaro	3	2
7	(United States) Benjamin Willwerth	6	6

Second round
3	(Netherlands) M Röttgering	6	6
(United States) M Exsted	2	4
(Brazil) LG Miguel	4	6	0
13	(Germany) M Schönhaus	6	4	6
11	(Finland) O Paldanius	6	6
(Australia) C Hewitt	3	0
(Puerto Rico) Y Álvarez	4	3
7	(United States) B Willwerth	6	6

Third round
3	(Netherlands) M Röttgering	3	4
13	(Germany) M Schönhaus	6	6
11	(Finland) O Paldanius	1	4
7	(United States) B Willwerth	6	6

Quarterfinals
13	(Germany) M Schönhaus	7^{7}	6
7	(United States) B Willwerth	6^{2}	3

=== Bottom half ===
==== Section 3 ====
First round
5	(Germany) Niels McDonald	6^{6}	7^{8}	6
Q	(Turkey) Kerem Yılmaz	7^{8}	6^{6}	4
WC	(United Kingdom) Aran Selvaraasan	1	2
(United States) Keaton Hance	6	6
(Morocco) Karim Bennani	6	7^{7}
(Sweden) William Rejchtman Vinciguerra	4	6^{2}
(Colombia) Alejandro Arcila	3	3
12	(Bulgaria) Alexander Vasilev	6	6
15	Timofei Derepasko	6	6
(Chinese Taipei) Chen Kuan-hsou	3	4
Q	(United States) Matisse Farzam	7	6
WC	(United Kingdom) Mark Ceban	5	2
(Austria) Thilo Behrmann	3	4
(Netherlands) Thijs Boogaard	6	6
Q	(Finland) Linus Lagerbohm	4	6	3
4	(United States) Jagger Leach	6	3	6

Second round
5	(Germany) N McDonald	6	6^{1}	4
(United States) K Hance	3	7^{7}	6
(Morocco) K Bennani	4	4
12	(Bulgaria) A Vasilev	6	6
15	T Derepasko	2	7	6
Q	(United States) M Farzam	6	5	1
(Netherlands) T Boogaard	6	6^{3}	6
4	(United States) J Leach	3	7^{7}	4

Third round
(United States) K Hance	6^{5}	4
12	(Bulgaria) A Vasilev	7^{7}	6
15	T Derepasko	6^{5}	6^{3}
(Netherlands) T Boogaard	7^{7}	7^{7}

Quarterfinals
12	(Bulgaria) A Vasilev	6	5	6
(Netherlands) T Boogaard	4	7	3

==== Section 4 ====
First round
8	(United States) Jack Kennedy	1	7^{7}	6
(United Kingdom) Oliver Bonding	6	6^{5}	4
(Czech Republic) Jan Kumstát	6	6
(India) Kriish Tyagi	3	3
Q	(United States) Ronit Karki	6	3	7^{10}
(Switzerland) Flynn Thomas	3	6	6^{7}
WC	(United Kingdom) Dylan Davies	6	3	4
9	(Romania) Yannick Theodor Alexandrescou	3	6	6
14	(Poland) Alan Ważny	6	7^{9}
(Brazil) João Pedro Didoni Bonini	4	6^{7}
WC	(United Kingdom) William Moxon	2	2
(United States) Dominick Mosejczuk	6	6
(Kazakhstan) Zangar Nurlanuly	2	4
(United States) Noah Johnston	6	6
(Germany) Jamie Mackenzie	6^{1}	3
2	(Italy) Jacopo Vasamì	7^{7}	6

Second round
8	(United States) J Kennedy	7^{7}	7^{10}
(Czech Republic) J Kumstát	6^{4}	6^{8}
Q	(United States) R Karki	6	6
9	(Romania) YT Alexandrescou	3	4
14	(Poland) A Ważny	7^{7}	4	6
(United States) D Mosejczuk	6^{3}	6	2
(United States) N Johnston	6^{3}	4
2	(Italy) J Vasamì	7^{7}	6

Third round
8	(United States) J Kennedy	6	3	4
Q	(United States) R Karki	4	6	6
14	(Poland) A Ważny	3	7^{7}	6
2	(Italy) J Vasamì	6	6^{4}	2

Quarterfinals
Q	(United States) R Karki	3	6	6
14	(Poland) A Ważny	6	3	4

== Qualifying ==
=== Seeds ===
1. (United States) Ronit Karki (qualified)
2. (Finland) Linus Lagerbohm (qualified)
3. (Italy) Gabriele Crivellaro (qualified)
4. (Spain) Tito Chávez (qualifying competition)
5. (Slovenia) Luka Talan Lopatić (qualifying competition)
6. (Turkey) Kerem Yılmaz (qualified)
7. (South Africa) Connor Doig (qualified)
8. (Italy) Michele Mecarelli (qualifying competition)
9. (United States) Gavin Goode (qualified)
10. (Kazakhstan) Damir Zhalgasbay (qualifying competition)
11. (Australia) Ty Host (first round)
12. (Japan) Shion Itsusaki (qualifying competition)
13. (Netherlands) Hidde Schoenmakers (qualifying competition)
14. (United States) Matisse Farzam (qualified)
15. (India) Arnav Vijay Paparkar (first round)
16. (India) Hitesh Chauhan (qualifying competition)

=== Qualifiers ===
1. (United States) Ronit Karki
2. (Finland) Linus Lagerbohm
3. (Italy) Gabriele Crivellaro
4. (United States) Gavin Goode
5. (Turkey) Haydar Cem Gökpınar
6. (Turkey) Kerem Yılmaz
7. (South Africa) Connor Doig
8. (United States) Matisse Farzam

=== Qualifying draw ===
==== First qualifier ====
First round
1	(United States) Ronit Karki	7^{7}	6
WC	(United Kingdom) Ferran Redza	6^{5}	2
WC	(United Kingdom) Zechariah Hamrouni	4	6	[2]
13	(Netherlands) Hidde Schoenmakers	6	4	[10]

Qualifying competition
1	(United States) Ronit Karki	7^{7}	2	[10]
13	(Netherlands) Hidde Schoenmakers	6^{3}	6	[6]

==== Second qualifier ====
First round
2	(Finland) Linus Lagerbohm	6	6
(India) Rethin Pranav Senthil Kumar	3	3
WC	(United Kingdom) Vincent Fletcher	6	1	[5]
10	(Kazakhstan) Damir Zhalgasbay	1	6	[10]

Qualifying competition
2	(Finland) Linus Lagerbohm	3	6	[10]
10	(Kazakhstan) Damir Zhalgasbay	6	3	[4]

==== Third qualifier ====
First round
3	(Italy) Gabriele Crivellaro	7^{7}	6
(Spain) Sergio Planella Hernández	6^{2}	2
(United States) Lachlan Gaskell	4	2
16	(India) Hitesh Chauhan	6	6

Qualifying competition
3	(Italy) Gabriele Crivellaro	6	6
16	(India) Hitesh Chauhan	3	4

==== Fourth qualifier ====
First round
4	(Spain) Tito Chávez	6	6
(Romania) Alejandro Mateo Berge Nourescu	2	4
(Australia) Jake Dembo	3	6^{4}
9	(United States) Gavin Goode	6	7^{7}

Qualifying competition
4	(Spain) Tito Chávez	3	5
9	(United States) Gavin Goode	6	7

==== Fifth qualifier ====
First round
5	(Slovenia) Luka Talan Lopatić	6	6
WC	(United Kingdom) Maximilian Carrier	4	3
(Turkey) Haydar Cem Gökpınar	6	6
15	(India) Arnav Vijay Paparkar	1	2

Qualifying competition
5	(Slovenia) Luka Talan Lopatić	2	1
(Turkey) Haydar Cem Gökpınar	6	6

==== Sixth qualifier ====
First round
6	(Turkey) Kerem Yılmaz	7^{7}	7
(United States) Roshan Santhosh	6^{1}	5
(France) Daniel Jade	6	6
11	(Australia) Ty Host	3	3

Qualifying competition
6	(Turkey) Kerem Yılmaz	6	6
(France) Daniel Jade	4	3

==== Seventh qualifier ====
First round
7	(South Africa) Connor Doig	3	6	[12]
(Bulgaria) Dimitar Kisimov	6	4	[10]
WC	(United Kingdom) Louis Hull	6	6^{6}	[10]
12	(Japan) Shion Itsusaki	2	7^{8}	[12]

Qualifying competition
7	(South Africa) Connor Doig	7^{7}	6
12	(Japan) Shion Itsusaki	6^{3}	2

==== Eighth qualifier ====
First round
8	(Italy) Michele Mecarelli	6	6
(Spain) Xavi Palomar	2	4
WC	(United Kingdom) Rafe Samuel	6^{7}	3
14	(United States) Matisse Farzam	7^{9}	6

Qualifying competition
8	(Italy) Michele Mecarelli	1	2
14	(United States) Matisse Farzam	6	6
