= 2025 Wimbledon Championships – Girls' 14&U singles =

Tennis event at the 2025 Wimbledon Championships

Girls' 14&U singles
- 2025 Wimbledon Championships

Final
- Champion: (Japan) Sakino Miyazawa
- Runner-up: (Ukraine) Sofiia Bielinska
- Score: 3–6, 7–5, [10–5]

Details
- Draw: 16

Events
Singles	men	women		boys	girls
Doubles	men	women	mixed	boys	girls
WC Singles	men	women	quad
WC Doubles	men	women	quad
14&U Singles	boys	girls
Legends	men	women	mixed
- Wimbledon Championships

Sakino Miyazawa defeated Sofiia Bielinska in the final, 3–6, 7–5, [10–5], to win the girls' 14&U singles title at the 2025 Wimbledon Championships.

Jana Kovačková was the previous champion, having won the 2024 title against Kristina Penickova.

== Format ==
The event was played as a 16-player round-robin tournament. The players were divided into four groups of four, with each group winner advancing to the semi-finals. The remaining players competed in consolation play-offs.

== Draw ==
=== Finals ===
Semi-finals
A1	(South Korea) Hong Ye-ri	3	6	[3]
C1	(Ukraine) Sofiia Bielinska	6	2	[10]
D1	(United Kingdom) Liv Zingg	4	4
B1	(Japan) Sakino Miyazawa	6	6

Final
C1	(Ukraine) Sofiia Bielinska	6	5	[5]
B1	(Japan) Sakino Miyazawa	3	7	[10]

=== Group A ===
		(South Korea) Hong	(Colombia) Villamil Arias	(Ukraine) Skryp	(United Kingdom) Milojevic	RR; W–L	Set; W–L	Game; W–L	Standings
A1	(South Korea) Hong Ye-ri		6–0, 6–2	6–4, 7–5	6–2, 6–0	3–0	6–0	37–13	1
A2	(Colombia) Laura Valentina Villamil Arias	0–6, 2–6		3–6, 1–6	3–6, 5–7	0–3	0–6	14–37	4
A3	(Ukraine) Violetta Skryp	4–6, 5–7	6–3, 6–1		2–6, 6–1, [4–10]	1–2	3–4	29–25	3
A4	(United Kingdom) Milica Sakamoto Milojevic	2–6, 0–6	6–3, 7–5	6–2, 1–6, [10–4]		2–1	4–3	23–28	2

=== Group B ===
		(Japan) Miyazawa	(United Kingdom) Sackflame	(Brazil) Souza	(United States) Shao	RR; W–L	Set; W–L	Game; W–L	Standings
B1	(Japan) Sakino Miyazawa		6–1, 6–0	6–3, 6–2	6–3, 6–0	3–0	6–0	36–9	1
B2	(United Kingdom) April Sackflame	1–6, 0–6		1–6, 7–6^{(7–3)}, [13–11]	1–6, 2–6	1–2	2–5	13–36	3
B3	(Brazil) Flavia Cherobim Souza	3–6, 2–6	6–1, 6–7^{(3–7)}, [11–13]		4–6, 2–6	0–3	1–6	23–33	4
B4	(United States) Caroline Shao	3–6, 0–6	6–1, 6–2	6–4, 6–2		2–1	4–2	27–21	2

=== Group C ===
		(Ukraine) Bielinska	(United Kingdom) Watson	(Australia) Jackson	(United States) Combs	RR; W–L	Set; W–L	Game; W–L	Standings
C1	(Ukraine) Sofiia Bielinska		7–6^{(7–3)}, 6–4	6–1, 6–1	4–6, 6–7^{(5–7)}	2–1	4–2	35–25	1
C2	(United Kingdom) Grace Watson	6–7^{(3–7)}, 4–6		6–4, 6–3	4–6, 6–0, [10–6]	2–1	4–3	33–26	3
C3	(Australia) Ceressa Jackson	1–6, 1–6	4–6, 3–6		7–6^{(7–3)}, 3–6, [6–10]	0–3	1–6	19–37	4
C4	(United States) Emery Combs	6–4, 7–6^{(7–5)}	6–4, 0–6, [6–10]	6–7^{(3–7)}, 6–3, [10–6]		2–1	5–3	32–31	2

=== Group D ===
		(United Kingdom) Zingg	(India) Kanabar	(South Korea) Lim	(Slovakia) Masaryková	RR; W–L	Set; W–L	Game; W–L	Standings
D1	(United Kingdom) Liv Zingg		7–6^{(7–5)}, 6–3	6–3, 6–2	6–3, 6–0	3–0	6–0	37–17	1
D2	(India) Jensi Dipakbhai Kanabar	6–7^{(5–7)}, 3–6		2–6, 6–2, [7–10]	4–6, 6–7^{(4–7)}	0–3	1–6	27–35	4
D3	(South Korea) Lim Ye-rin	3–6, 2–6	6–2, 2–6, [10–7]		1–6, 6–4, [6–10]	1–2	3–5	21–31	3
D4	(Slovakia) Laura Masaryková	3–6, 0–6	6–4, 7–6^{(7–4)}	6–1, 4–6, [10–6]		2–1	4–3	27–29	2

Standings were determined by: 1. number of wins; 2. number of matches played; 3. in two-player ties, head-to-head record; 4. in three-player ties, percentage of sets won, then percentage of games won.

=== Consolation play-offs ===
First round
C4	(United States) Emery Combs	6	6
D4	(Slovakia) Laura Masaryková	4	2
A4	(United Kingdom) Milica Sakamoto Milojevic	2	0
B4	(United States) Caroline Shao	6	6

Second round
C4	(United States) Emery Combs	3	3
B4	(United States) Caroline Shao	6	6

First round
D3	(South Korea) Lim Ye-rin	6	4	[10]
B2	(United Kingdom) April Sackflame	2	6	[5]
A3	(Ukraine) Violetta Skryp	4	2
C2	(United Kingdom) Grace Watson	6	6

Second round
D3	(South Korea) Lim Ye-rin	7	6^{6}	[10]
C2	(United Kingdom) Grace Watson	5	7^{8}	[6]

First round
B3	(Brazil) Flavia Cherobim Souza	w/o
A2	(Colombia) Laura Valentina Villamil Arias
C3	(Australia) Ceressa Jackson	6	4	[7]
D2	(India) Jensi Dipakbhai Kanabar	4	6	[10]

Second round
B3	(Brazil) Flavia Cherobim Souza
D2	(India) Jensi Dipakbhai Kanabar	w/o
