= 2025 Wimbledon Championships – Wheelchair women's singles =

Tennis championship

Wheelchair women's singles
- 2025 Wimbledon Championships

Final
- Champion: (China) Wang Ziying
- Runner-up: (Japan) Yui Kamiji
- Score: 6–3, 6–3

Details
- Draw: 16
- Seeds: 4

Events
Singles	men	women		boys	girls
Doubles	men	women	mixed	boys	girls
WC Singles	men	women	quad
WC Doubles	men	women	quad
14&U Singles	boys	girls
Legends	men	women	mixed
- Wimbledon Championships

Wang Ziying defeated Yui Kamiji in the final, 6–3, 6–3 to win the ladies' singles wheelchair tennis title at the 2025 Wimbledon Championships. It was her first major singles title, becoming the first Chinese major singles champion in wheelchair tennis.

Diede de Groot was the four-time defending champion, but lost in the quarterfinals to Li Xiaohui.

== Seeds ==
1. (Japan) Yui Kamiji (final)
2. (Netherlands) Aniek van Koot (first round)
3. (China) Li Xiaohui (semifinals)
4. (China) Wang Ziying (champion)

== Draw ==
Key

- Q = Qualifier
- WC = Wild card
- LL = Lucky loser
- Alt = Alternate
- ITF = ITF entry
- PR = Protected ranking
- SR = Special ranking
- SE = Special exempt
- JE = Junior exempt
- JR = Junior Accelerator Programme entrant
- CO = College Accelerator Programme entrant
- NG = Next Gen Accelerator Program entrant
- w/o = Walkover
- r = Retired
- d = Defaulted

=== Finals ===
First round
1	(Japan) Yui Kamiji	6	6
(Colombia) Angélica Bernal	4	1
(Japan) Manami Tanaka	1	1
(Netherlands) Lizzy de Greef	6	6
3	(China) Li Xiaohui	6	4	7^{10}
(China) Zhu Zhenzhen	1	6	6^{4}
(Netherlands) Diede de Groot	6	6
WC	(United Kingdom) Lucy Shuker	1	1
(Chile) Macarena Cabrillana	3	1
(Japan) Saki Takamuro	6	6
(Netherlands) Jiske Griffioen	3	7^{7}	3
4	(China) Wang Ziying	6	6^{4}	6
(South Africa) Kgothatso Montjane	7^{7}	6
WC	(United Kingdom) Cornelia Oosthuizen	6^{2}	2
(France) Ksénia Chasteau	6	7^{7}
2	(Netherlands) Aniek van Koot	2	6^{5}

Quarterfinals
1	(Japan) Y Kamiji	6	6
(Netherlands) L de Greef	0	0
3	(China) X Li	7^{8}	6
(Netherlands) D de Groot	6^{6}	4
(Japan) S Takamuro	1	0
4	(China) Z Wang	6	6
(South Africa) K Montjane	3	6	6
(France) K Chasteau	6	3	3

Semifinals
1	(Japan) Y Kamiji	6	6
3	(China) X Li	2	2
4	(China) Z Wang	6	7
(South Africa) K Montjane	3	5

Final
1	(Japan) Y Kamiji	3	3
4	(China) Z Wang	6	6
