= 2025 Wimbledon Championships – Gentlemen's invitation doubles =

Tennis championship

Gentlemen's invitation doubles
- 2025 Wimbledon Championships

Final
- Champions: (United States) Bob Bryan (United States) Mike Bryan
- Runners-up: (Australia) Lleyton Hewitt (Australia) Mark Philippoussis
- Score: 6–1, 5–7, [10–3]

Events
Singles	men	women		boys	girls
Doubles	men	women	mixed	boys	girls
WC Singles	men	women	quad
WC Doubles	men	women	quad
Legends	men	women	mixed
14&U Singles	boys	girls
← 2024 ·	Wimbledon Championships	· 2026 →

Bob and Mike Bryan won their fourth consecutive gentlemen's invitation doubles title at the 2025 Wimbledon Championships, defeating Lleyton Hewitt and Mark Philippoussis in the final, 6–1, 5–7, [10–3].

== Draw ==
=== Final ===
Final
A1	(United States) Bob Bryan (United States) Mike Bryan	6	5	[10]
B1	(Australia) Lleyton Hewitt (Australia) Mark Philippoussis	1	7	[3]

=== Group A ===
		(United States) Bryan (United States) Bryan	(Germany) Haas (Spain) López	(Sweden) Lindstedt (Romania) Tecău	(Colombia) Cabal (Colombia) Farah	RR; W–L	Set; W–L	Game; W–L	Standings
A1	(United States) Bob Bryan (United States) Mike Bryan		6–3, 7–6^{(7–4)}	6–3, 6–3	6–1, 7–6^{(9–7)}	3–0	6–0	38–22	1
A2	(Germany) Tommy Haas (Spain) Feliciano López	3–6, 6–7^{(4–7)}		3–6, 6–4, [10–6]	6–7^{(5–7)}, 6–1, [8–10]	1–2	3–5	31–32	3
A3	(Sweden) Robert Lindstedt (Romania) Horia Tecău	3–6, 3–6	6–3, 4–6, [6–10]		6–3, 3–6, [5–10]	0–3	2–6	25–32	4
A4	(Colombia) Juan Sebastián Cabal (Colombia) Robert Farah	1–6, 6–7^{(7–9)}	7–6^{(7–5)}, 1–6, [10–8]	3–6, 6–3, [10–5]		2–1	4–4	26–34	2

=== Group B ===
		(Australia) Hewitt (Australia) Philippoussis	(Cyprus) Baghdatis (Belgium) Malisse	(United States) Blake (United States) Querrey	(France) Chardy (Brazil) Soares	RR; W–L	Set; W–L	Game; W–L	Standings
B1	(Australia) Lleyton Hewitt (Australia) Mark Philippoussis		6–3, 3–6, [18–16]	5–7, 6–2, [10–7]	6–3, 6–4	3–0	6–2	34–25	1
B2	(Cyprus) Marcos Baghdatis (Belgium) Xavier Malisse	3–6, 6–3, [16–18]		7–6^{(7–4)}, 6–2	6–7^{(9–11)}, 6–3, [7–10]	1–2	4–4	34–29	3
B3	(United States) James Blake (United States) Sam Querrey	7–5, 2–6, [7–10]	6–7^{(4–7)}, 2–6		3–6, 5–7	0–3	1–6	25–38	4
B4	(France) Jérémy Chardy (Brazil) Bruno Soares	3–6, 4–6	7–6^{(11–9)}, 3–6, [10–7]	6–3, 7–5		2–1	4–3	31–32	2
