= 2025 Wimbledon Championships – Boys' 14&U singles =

Tennis event at the 2025 Wimbledon Championships

Boys' 14&U singles
- 2025 Wimbledon Championships

Final
- Champion: (Austria) Moritz Freitag
- Runner-up: (Greece) Rafael Pagonis
- Score: 4–6, 6–1, [10–4]

Details
- Draw: 16

Events
Singles	men	women		boys	girls
Doubles	men	women	mixed	boys	girls
WC Singles	men	women	quad
WC Doubles	men	women	quad
14&U Singles	boys	girls
Legends	men	women	mixed
- Wimbledon Championships

Moritz Freitag defeated Rafael Pagonis in the final, 4–6, 6–1, [10–4], to win the boys' 14&U singles title at the 2025 Wimbledon Championships.

Takahiro Kawaguchi was the previous champion, having won the 2024 title against Jordan Lee.

== Format ==
The event was played as a 16-player round-robin tournament. The players were divided into four groups of four, with each group winner advancing to the semi-finals. The remaining players competed in consolation play-offs.

== Draw ==
=== Finals ===
Semi-finals
A1	(Greece) Rafael Pagonis	4	6	[10]
C1	Nikita Berdin	6	2	[5]
D1	(Austria) Moritz Freitag	6	6
B1	(France) Mario Vukovic	2	4

Final
A1	(Greece) Rafael Pagonis	6	1	[4]
D1	(Austria) Moritz Freitag	4	6	[10]

=== Group A ===
		(Greece) Pagonis	(South Korea) Kim	(Venezuela) Mejías	(United States) Ascenzo	RR; W–L	Set; W–L	Game; W–L	Standings
A1	(Greece) Rafael Pagonis		6–1, 6–1	4–6, 6–0, [11–9]	6–2, 6–2	3–0	6–1	35–12	1
A2	(South Korea) Kim Si-yun	1–6, 1–6		2–6, 0–6	1–6, 4–6	0–3	0–6	9–36	4
A3	(Venezuela) Ignacio Mejías	6–4, 0–6, [9–11]	6–2, 6–0		3–6, 6–7^{(8–10)}	1–2	3–4	27–26	3
A4	(United States) Tristan Ascenzo	2–6, 2–6	6–1, 6–4	6–3, 7–6^{(10–8)}		2–1	4–2	29–26	2

=== Group B ===
		(France) Vukovic	(China) Wu	(Australia) Palombo	(South Korea) Jang	RR; W–L	Set; W–L	Game; W–L	Standings
B1	(France) Mario Vukovic		6–2, 6–4	6–1, 7–6^{(7–3)}	6–3, 7–6^{(8–6)}	3–0	6–0	38–22	1
B2	(China) Yu Ting Wu	2–6, 4–6		5–7, 7–5, [10–5]	6–1, 0–6, [10–8]	2–1	4–4	26–31	2
B3	(Australia) Novak Palombo	1–6, 6–7^{(3–7)}	7–5, 5–7, [5–10]		0–6, 2–6	0–3	1–6	21–38	4
B4	(South Korea) Jang Jun-seo	3–6, 6–7^{(6–8)}	1–6, 6–0, [8–10]	6–0, 6–2		1–2	3–4	28–22	3

=== Group C ===
		Berdin	(France) Giurescu	(United Kingdom) Kiely	(Hong Kong) Choi	RR; W–L	Set; W–L	Game; W–L	Standings
C1	Nikita Berdin		6–3, 6–2	6–7^{(5–7)}, 6–3, [7–10]	6–3, 1–6, [10–6]	2–1	5–3	32–25	1
C2	(France) Evan Giurescu	3–6, 2–6		6–4, 6–1	2–6, 2–6	1–2	2–4	21–29	3
C3	(United Kingdom) Myles Kiely	7–6^{(7–5)}, 3–6, [10–7]	4–6, 1–6		1–6, 0–6	1–2	2–5	17–36	4
C4	(Hong Kong) Fu Wang Choi	3–6, 6–1, [6–10]	6–2, 6–2	6–1, 6–0		2–1	5–2	33–13	2

=== Group D ===
		(Austria) Freitag	(United Kingdom) Kamal	(Brazil) Ferraz	(Netherlands) Drijver	RR; W–L	Set; W–L	Game; W–L	Standings
D1	(Austria) Moritz Freitag		6–2, 6–4	6–1, 6–2	6–1, 6–0	3–0	6–0	36–10	1
D2	(United Kingdom) Haqim Kamal	2–6, 4–6		6–4, 7–5	6–2, 7–6^{(8–6)}	2–1	4–2	32–29	2
D3	(Brazil) Miguel Ferraz	1–6, 2–6	4–6, 5–7		3–6, 1–6	0–3	0–6	16–37	4
D4	(Netherlands) Laurens Drijver	1–6, 0–6	2–6, 6–7^{(6–8)}	6–3, 6–1		1–2	2–4	21–29	3

Standings were determined by: 1. number of wins; 2. number of matches played; 3. in two-player ties, head-to-head record; 4. in three-player ties, percentage of sets won, then percentage of games won.

=== Consolation play-offs ===
First round
C4	(Hong Kong) Fu Wang Choi	6	3	[7]
A4	(United States) Tristan Ascenzo	3	6	[10]
D2	(United Kingdom) Haqim Kamal	5	7^{7}	[9]
B2	(China) Yu Ting Wu	7	6^{4}	[11]

Second round
A4	(United States) Tristan Ascenzo	6	7^{7}
B2	(China) Yu Ting Wu	4	6^{4}

First round
C2	(France) Evan Giurescu	4	7	[4]
A3	(Venezuela) Ignacio Mejías	6	5	[10]
B4	(South Korea) Jang Jun-seo	6	6
D4	(Netherlands) Laurens Drijver	1	1

Second round
A3	(Venezuela) Ignacio Mejías
B4	(South Korea) Jang Jun-seo	w/o

First round
A2	(South Korea) Kim Si-yun	4	3
B3	(Australia) Novak Palombo	6	6
C3	(United Kingdom) Myles Kiely	6	7
D3	(Brazil) Miguel Ferraz	1	5

Second round
B3	(Australia) Novak Palombo	6^{5}	3
C3	(United Kingdom) Myles Kiely	7^{7}	6
