= 2025 Wimbledon Championships – Ladies' invitation doubles =

Tennis championship

Ladies' invitation doubles
- 2025 Wimbledon Championships

Final
- Champions: (Zimbabwe) Cara Black (Switzerland) Martina Hingis
- Runners-up: (Slovakia) Dominika Cibulková (Czech Republic) Barbora Strýcová
- Score: 6–2, 6–3

Events
Singles	men	women		boys	girls
Doubles	men	women	mixed	boys	girls
WC Singles	men	women	quad
WC Doubles	men	women	quad
Legends	men	women	mixed
14&U Singles	boys	girls
← 2024 ·	Wimbledon Championships	· 2026 →

Cara Black and Martina Hingis won the ladies' invitation doubles title at the 2025 Wimbledon Championships, defeating Dominika Cibulková and Barbora Strýcová in the final, 6–2, 6–3.

Kim Clijsters and Hingis were the three-time reigning champions, but Clijsters did not compete this year.

== Draw ==
=== Final ===
Final
A1	(Slovakia) Dominika Cibulková (Czech Republic) Barbora Strýcová	2	3
B1	(Zimbabwe) Cara Black (Switzerland) Martina Hingis	6	6

=== Group A ===
		(Slovakia) Cibulková (Czech Republic) Strýcová	(United Kingdom) Broady (United States) King	(Belgium) Flipkens (Germany) Petkovic	(France) Golovin (United Kingdom) Robson	RR; W–L	Set; W–L	Game; W–L	Standings
A1	(Slovakia) Dominika Cibulková (Czech Republic) Barbora Strýcová		7–5, 3–6, [10–7]	6–4, 6–4	6–2, 6–2	3–0	6–1	35–23	1
A2	(United Kingdom) Naomi Broady (United States) Vania King	5–7, 6–3, [7–10]		6–7^{(4–7)}, 4–6	6–4, 6–4	1–2	3–4	33–32	3
A3	(Belgium) Kirsten Flipkens (Germany) Andrea Petkovic	4–6, 4–6	7–6^{(7–4)}, 6–4		7–5, 6–2	2–1	4–2	34–29	2
A4	(France) Tatiana Golovin (United Kingdom) Laura Robson	2–6, 2–6	4–6, 4–6	5–7, 2–6		0–3	0–6	19–37	4

=== Group B ===
		(Zimbabwe) Black (Switzerland) Hingis	(Poland) Radwańska (Slovakia) Rybáriková	(Slovakia) Hantuchová (United States) Vandeweghe	(Netherlands) Bertens (United Kingdom) Konta	RR; W–L	Set; W–L	Game; W–L	Standings
B1	(Zimbabwe) Cara Black (Switzerland) Martina Hingis		6–3, 6–3	6–2, 6–4	6–2, 6–2	3–0	6–0	36–16	1
B2	(Poland) Agnieszka Radwańska (Slovakia) Magdaléna Rybáriková	3–6, 3–6		6–4, 6–3	6–1, 4–6, [10–2]	2–1	4–3	29–26	2
B3	(Slovakia) Daniela Hantuchová (United States) CoCo Vandeweghe	2–6, 4–6	4–6, 3–6		6–4, 6–1	1–2	2–4	25–29	3
B4	(Netherlands) Kiki Bertens (United Kingdom) Johanna Konta	2–6, 2–6	1–6, 6–4, [2–10]	4–6, 1–6		0–3	1–6	16–35	4
