= 2025 Wimbledon Championships – Girls' doubles =

Tennis championship

Girls' doubles
- 2025 Wimbledon Championships

Final
- Champions: (United States) Kristina Penickova (Czech Republic) Vendula Valdmannová
- Runners-up: (United States) Thea Frodin (United States) Julieta Pareja
- Score: 6–4, 6–2

Details
- Draw: 32
- Seeds: 8

Events
Singles	men	women		boys	girls
Doubles	men	women	mixed	boys	girls
WC Singles	men	women	quad
WC Doubles	men	women	quad
14&U Singles	boys	girls
Legends	men	women	mixed
- Wimbledon Championships

Kristina Penickova and Vendula Valdmannová won the girls' doubles title at the 2025 Wimbledon Championships, defeating Thea Frodin and Julieta Pareja in the final, 6–4, 6–2.

Tyra Caterina Grant and Iva Jovic were the defending champions, but chose not to compete this year.

== Seeds ==
1. (United Kingdom) Hannah Klugman / (United Kingdom) Mika Stojsavljevic (second round)
2. (Australia) Emerson Jones / (Belgium) Jeline Vandromme (quarterfinals)
3. (Czech Republic) Alena Kovačková / (Czech Republic) Jana Kovačková (semifinals)
4. (Brazil) Victoria Luiza Barros / (Serbia) Teodora Kostović (second round)
5. (United States) Thea Frodin / (United States) Julieta Pareja (final)
6. (Spain) Charo Esquiva Bañuls / (Sweden) Nellie Taraba Wallberg (quarterfinals)
7. (Slovakia) Mia Pohánková / (Serbia) Luna Vujović (second round)
8. (United States) Kristina Penickova / (Czech Republic) Vendula Valdmannová (champions)

== Draw ==
Key

- Q = Qualifier
- WC = Wild card
- LL = Lucky loser
- Alt = Alternate
- ITF = ITF entry
- PR = Protected ranking
- SR = Special ranking
- SE = Special exempt
- JE = Junior exempt
- JR = Junior Accelerator Programme entrant
- CO = College Accelerator Programme entrant
- NG = Next Gen Accelerator Program entrant
- w/o = Walkover
- r = Retired
- d = Defaulted

=== Finals ===
Semifinals
5	(United States) Thea Frodin (United States) Julieta Pareja	4	6	[10]
(Czech Republic) Julie Paštiková (Germany) Julia Stusek	6	4	[4]
3	(Czech Republic) Alena Kovačková (Czech Republic) Jana Kovačková	6^{3}	2
8	(United States) Kristina Penickova (Czech Republic) Vendula Valdmannová	7^{7}	6

Final
5	(United States) Thea Frodin (United States) Julieta Pareja	4	2
8	(United States) Kristina Penickova (Czech Republic) Vendula Valdmannová	6	6

=== Top half ===
First round
1	(United Kingdom) Hannah Klugman (United Kingdom) Mika Stojsavljevic	6	6
(Bulgaria) Yoana Konstantinova (Lithuania) Laima Vladson	3	1
(United States) Leena Friedman (Japan) Reina Goto	3	4
(China) Qu Yihan (Thailand) Kamonwan Yodpetch	6	6
(Germany) Victoria Pohle (Japan) Kanon Sawashiro	1	3
(Australia) Tahlia Kokkinis (United States) Aspen Schuman	6	6
(United Kingdom) Hephzibah Oluwadare (Spain) Eugenia Zozaya Menéndez	2	2
5	(United States) Thea Frodin (United States) Julieta Pareja	6	6
4	(Brazil) Victoria Luiza Barros (Serbia) Teodora Kostović	5	6	[10]
(France) Ksenia Efremova (China) Zhang Ruien	7	3	[8]
(Australia) Renee Alame (Romania) Giulia Safina Popa	6^{1}	5
(Czech Republic) Sarah Melany Fajmonová (Slovakia) Kali Šupová	7^{7}	7
(United States) Maya Iyengar (Spain) Neus Torner Sensano	3	3
(Czech Republic) Julie Paštiková (Germany) Julia Stusek	6	6
WC	(United Kingdom) Ruby Cooling (United Kingdom) Megan Knight	6^{5}	3
7	(Slovakia) Mia Pohánková (Serbia) Luna Vujović	7^{7}	6

Second round
1	(United Kingdom) H Klugman (United Kingdom) M Stojsavljevic	1	5
(China) Y Qu (Thailand) K Yodpetch	6	7
(Australia) T Kokkinis (United States) A Schuman	3	3
5	(United States) T Frodin (United States) J Pareja	6	6
4	(Brazil) VL Barros (Serbia) T Kostović	3	2
(Czech Republic) SM Fajmonová (Slovakia) K Šupová	6	6
(Czech Republic) J Paštiková (Germany) J Stusek	6	6
7	(Slovakia) M Pohánková (Serbia) L Vujović	4	1

Quarterfinals
(China) Y Qu (Thailand) K Yodpetch	6^{7}	4
5	(United States) T Frodin (United States) J Pareja	7^{9}	6
(Czech Republic) SM Fajmonová (Slovakia) K Šupová	2	3
(Czech Republic) J Paštiková (Germany) J Stusek	6	6

Semifinals
5	(United States) T Frodin (United States) J Pareja	4	6	[10]
(Czech Republic) J Paštiková (Germany) J Stusek	6	4	[4]

=== Bottom half ===
First round
6	(Spain) Charo Esquiva Bañuls (Sweden) Nellie Taraba Wallberg	6	6
(Serbia) Anastasija Cvetković (Romania) Diana-Ioana Simionescu	1	3
(China) Shao Yushan (China) Sun Xinran	4	7^{7}	[13]
WC	(United Kingdom) Daniella Britton (United Kingdom) Edie Griffiths	6	6^{5}	[11]
(Germany) Eva Bennemann (Germany) Sonja Zhenikhova	7^{7}	4	[6]
Alt	(Croatia) Dora Mišković (Sweden) Lea Nilsson	6^{4}	6	[10]
WC	(United Kingdom) Brooke Black (United Kingdom) Daniela Piani	3	1
3	(Czech Republic) Alena Kovačková (Czech Republic) Jana Kovačková	6	6
8	(United States) Kristina Penickova (Czech Republic) Vendula Valdmannová	4	6	[10]
(Canada) Nadia Lagaev (Brazil) Nauhany Vitória Leme da Silva	6	0	[3]
(Argentina) Luna María Cinalli (United Kingdom) Allegra Korpanec Davies	7^{7}	6^{7}	[6]
(Turkey) Denız Dilek (Latvia) Beatrise Zeltiņa	6^{4}	7^{9}	[10]
WC	(United Kingdom) Hollie Smart (United Kingdom) Mia Wainwright	4	6	[10]
(Israel) Mika Buchnik (Argentina) Sol Ailin Larraya Guidi	6	3	[8]
(Romania) Maia Ilinca Burcescu (United States) Capucine Jauffret	3	3
2	(Australia) Emerson Jones (Belgium) Jeline Vandromme	6	6

Second round
6	(Spain) C Esquiva Bañuls (Sweden) N Taraba Wallberg	1	6	[12]
(China) Y Shao (China) X Sun	6	2	[10]
Alt	(Croatia) D Mišković (Sweden) L Nilsson	2	4
3	(Czech Republic) A Kovačková (Czech Republic) J Kovačková	6	6
8	(United States) K Penickova (Czech Republic) V Valdmannová	7^{7}	6
(Turkey) D Dilek (Latvia) B Zeltiņa	6^{2}	2
WC	(United Kingdom) H Smart (United Kingdom) M Wainwright	7	5	[7]
2	(Australia) E Jones (Belgium) J Vandromme	5	7	[10]

Quarterfinals
6	(Spain) C Esquiva Bañuls (Sweden) N Taraba Wallberg	5	4
3	(Czech Republic) A Kovačková (Czech Republic) J Kovačková	7	6
8	(United States) K Penickova (Czech Republic) V Valdmannová	7^{9}	6
2	(Australia) E Jones (Belgium) J Vandromme	6^{7}	2

Semifinals
3	(Czech Republic) A Kovačková (Czech Republic) J Kovačková	6^{3}	2
8	(United States) K Penickova (Czech Republic) V Valdmannová	7^{7}	6
