= 2025 Wimbledon Championships – Wheelchair men's doubles =

Tennis championship

Wheelchair men's doubles
- 2025 Wimbledon Championships

Final
- Champions: (Spain) Martín de la Puente (Netherlands) Ruben Spaargaren
- Runners-up: (United Kingdom) Alfie Hewett (United Kingdom) Gordon Reid
- Score: 7–6^{(7–1)}, 7–5

Details
- Draw: 8
- Seeds: 2

Events
Singles	men	women		boys	girls
Doubles	men	women	mixed	boys	girls
WC Singles	men	women	quad
WC Doubles	men	women	quad
14&U Singles	boys	girls
Legends	men	women	mixed
- Wimbledon Championships

Martín de la Puente and Ruben Spaargaren defeated two-time defending champions Alfie Hewett and Gordon Reid in the final, 7–6^{(7–1)}, 7–5 to win the gentlemen's doubles wheelchair tennis title at the 2025 Wimbledon Championships.

== Seeds ==
1. (United Kingdom) Alfie Hewett / (United Kingdom) Gordon Reid (final)
2. (Spain) Martín de la Puente / (Netherlands) Ruben Spaargaren (champions)

== Draw ==
Key

- Q = Qualifier
- WC = Wild card
- LL = Lucky loser
- Alt = Alternate
- ITF = ITF entry
- PR = Protected ranking
- SR = Special ranking
- SE = Special exempt
- JE = Junior exempt
- JR = Junior Accelerator Programme entrant
- CO = College Accelerator Programme entrant
- NG = Next Gen Accelerator Program entrant
- w/o = Walkover
- r = Retired
- d = Defaulted

=== Finals ===
Quarterfinals
1	(United Kingdom) Alfie Hewett (United Kingdom) Gordon Reid	6	6
(Japan) Takuya Miki (United States) Casey Ratzlaff	3	2
(Netherlands) Tom Egberink (Belgium) Joachim Gérard	5	6	6^{7}
(Spain) Daniel Caverzaschi (Japan) Tokito Oda	7	4	7^{10}
(China) Ji Zhenxu (Israel) Sergei Lysov	7	6
(United Kingdom) Ben Bartram (United Kingdom) Dahnon Ward	5	4
(Chile) Alexander Cataldo (France) Stéphane Houdet	2	6	2
2	(Spain) Martín de la Puente (Netherlands) Ruben Spaargaren	6	4	6

Semifinals
1	(United Kingdom) Alfie Hewett (United Kingdom) Gordon Reid	3	6	6
(Spain) Daniel Caverzaschi (Japan) Tokito Oda	6	4	0
(China) Ji Zhenxu (Israel) Sergei Lysov	2	4
2	(Spain) Martín de la Puente (Netherlands) Ruben Spaargaren	6	6

Final
1	(United Kingdom) Alfie Hewett (United Kingdom) Gordon Reid	6^{1}	5
2	(Spain) Martín de la Puente (Netherlands) Ruben Spaargaren	7^{7}	7

== Sources ==
- Entry list
- Draw
