= 2025 Wimbledon Championships – Boys' doubles =

Tennis championship

Boys' doubles
- 2025 Wimbledon Championships

Final
- Champions: (Finland) Oskari Paldanius (Poland) Alan Ważny
- Runners-up: (United Kingdom) Oliver Bonding (United States) Jagger Leach
- Score: 5–7, 7–6^{(8–6)}, [10–5]

Details
- Draw: 32
- Seeds: 8

Events
Singles	men	women		boys	girls
Doubles	men	women	mixed	boys	girls
WC Singles	men	women	quad
WC Doubles	men	women	quad
14&U Singles	boys	girls
Legends	men	women	mixed
- Wimbledon Championships

Oskari Paldanius and Alan Ważny won the boys' doubles title at the 2025 Wimbledon Championships, defeating Oliver Bonding and Jagger Leach in the final, 5–7, 7–6^{(8–6)}, [10–5]. They saved two championship points in the second-set tiebreak. It was the second successive major title for Paldanius and Ważny, having also won the 2025 French Open title, completing the Channel Slam in boys' doubles.

Alexander Razeghi and Max Schönhaus were the defending champions, but Razeghi was no longer eligible to compete in junior events. Schönhaus partnered Andrés Santamarta Roig, but lost in the quarterfinals to Bonding and Leach.

== Seeds ==
1. (Spain) Andrés Santamarta Roig / (Germany) Max Schönhaus (quarterfinals)
2. Timofei Derepasko / (Italy) Jacopo Vasamì (second round)
3. (Germany) Jamie Mackenzie / (Germany) Niels McDonald (first round)
4. (Finland) Oskari Paldanius / (Poland) Alan Ważny (champions)
5. (United States) Keaton Hance / (United States) Jack Kennedy (second round)
6. (Italy) Pierluigi Basile / (Bulgaria) Alexander Vasilev (second round)
7. (United States) Noah Johnston / (United States) Benjamin Willwerth (second round)
8. (United Kingdom) Oliver Bonding / (United States) Jagger Leach (final)

== Draw ==
Key

- Q = Qualifier
- WC = Wild card
- LL = Lucky loser
- Alt = Alternate
- ITF = ITF entry
- PR = Protected ranking
- SR = Special ranking
- SE = Special exempt
- JE = Junior exempt
- JR = Junior Accelerator Programme entrant
- CO = College Accelerator Programme entrant
- NG = Next Gen Accelerator Program entrant
- w/o = Walkover
- r = Retired
- d = Defaulted

=== Finals ===
Semifinals
8	(United Kingdom) Oliver Bonding (United States) Jagger Leach	4	7^{8}	[11]
(Netherlands) Mees Röttgering (Netherlands) Hidde Schoenmakers	6	6^{6}	[9]
4	(Finland) Oskari Paldanius (Poland) Alan Ważny	6	4	[10]
(Kazakhstan) Amir Omarkhanov; Egor Pleshivtsev	4	6	[5]

Final
8	(United Kingdom) Oliver Bonding (United States) Jagger Leach	7	6^{6}	[5]
4	(Finland) Oskari Paldanius (Poland) Alan Ważny	5	7^{8}	[10]

=== Top half ===
First round
1	(Spain) Andrés Santamarta Roig (Germany) Max Schönhaus	6	6
(United States) Ronit Karki (United States) Jack Satterfield	2	4
(Italy) Gabriele Crivellaro (Argentina) Dante Pagani	4	7^{7}	[6]
WC	(United Kingdom) Conor Brady (United Kingdom) Benjamin Gusic-Wan	6	6^{4}	[10]
(United States) Ryan Cozad (United States) Maximus Dussault	5	7^{7}	[7]
(Kazakhstan) Zangar Nurlanuly (Kazakhstan) Damir Zhalgasbay	7	6^{3}	[10]
(Morocco) Karim Bennani (Sweden) Ludvig Fredrik Hede	2	6^{5}
8	(United Kingdom) Oliver Bonding (United States) Jagger Leach	6	7^{7}
3	(Germany) Jamie Mackenzie (Germany) Niels McDonald	4	3
(Puerto Rico) Yannik Álvarez (United States) Jack Secord	6	6
(Romania) Yannick Theodor Alexandrescou (Romania) Ștefan Horia Haita	6	4	[5]
WC	(United Kingdom) Eric Lorimer (United Kingdom) William Moxon	3	6	[10]
(Netherlands) Mees Röttgering (Netherlands) Hidde Schoenmakers	6	6
(Austria) Thilo Behrmann (Ukraine) Nikita Bilozertsev	1	2
(Brazil) Luis Guto Miguel (Slovenia) Žiga Šeško	6^{5}	3^{r}
5	(United States) Keaton Hance (United States) Jack Kennedy	7^{7}	3

Second round
1	(Spain) A Santamarta Roig (Germany) M Schönhaus	6	6
WC	(United Kingdom) C Brady (United Kingdom) B Gusic-Wan	3	4
(Kazakhstan) Z Nurlanuly (Kazakhstan) D Zhalgasbay	3	6	[8]
8	(United Kingdom) O Bonding (United States) J Leach	6	4	[10]
(Puerto Rico) Y Álvarez (United States) J Secord	6	7^{7}
WC	(United Kingdom) E Lorimer (United Kingdom) W Moxon	4	6^{1}
(Netherlands) M Röttgering (Netherlands) H Schoenmakers	6	7^{7}
5	(United States) K Hance (United States) J Kennedy	4	6^{4}

Quarterfinals
1	(Spain) A Santamarta Roig (Germany) M Schönhaus	3	6	[7]
8	(United Kingdom) O Bonding (United States) J Leach	6	2	[10]
(Puerto Rico) Y Álvarez (United States) J Secord	2	6^{5}
(Netherlands) M Röttgering (Netherlands) H Schoenmakers	6	7^{7}

Semifinals
8	(United Kingdom) O Bonding (United States) J Leach	4	7^{8}	[11]
(Netherlands) M Röttgering (Netherlands) H Schoenmakers	6	6^{6}	[9]

=== Bottom half ===
First round
7	(United States) Noah Johnston (United States) Benjamin Willwerth	6	7^{7}
WC	(United Kingdom) Felix Bockelmann Evans (United Kingdom) Ferran Redza	1	6^{2}
(Finland) Linus Lagerbohm; Savva Rybkin	3	2
(United States) Maxwell Exsted (Czech Republic) Jan Kumstát	6	6
(Turkey) Haydar Cem Gökpınar (Turkey) Kerem Yılmaz	0	2
(United Kingdom) Mark Ceban (Australia) Cruz Hewitt	6	6
Alt	(Japan) Shion Itsusaki (India) Rethin Pranav Senthil Kumar	1	1
4	(Finland) Oskari Paldanius (Poland) Alan Ważny	6	6
6	(Italy) Pierluigi Basile (Bulgaria) Alexander Vasilev	6^{1}	7^{7}	[10]
(Chinese Taipei) Chen Kuan-hsou (Switzerland) Flynn Thomas	7^{7}	6^{4}	[6]
WC	(United Kingdom) Dylan Davies (United Kingdom) Rhys Lawlor	6	4	[6]
(South Africa) Connor Doig (India) Kriish Tyagi	3	6	[10]
(Kazakhstan) Amir Omarkhanov; Egor Pleshivtsev	6	7
(United States) Matisse Farzam (United States) Gavin Goode	3	5
(Colombia) Alejandro Arcila (United States) Dominick Mosejczuk	3	6	[0]^{r}
2	Timofei Derepasko (Italy) Jacopo Vasamì	6	3	[0]

Second round
7	(United States) N Johnston (United States) B Willwerth	4	4
(United States) M Exsted (Czech Republic) J Kumstát	6	6
(United Kingdom) M Ceban (Australia) C Hewitt	5	1
4	(Finland) O Paldanius (Poland) A Ważny	7	6
6	(Italy) P Basile (Bulgaria) A Vasilev	3	6	[7]
(South Africa) C Doig (India) K Tyagi	6	3	[10]
(Kazakhstan) A Omarkhanov; E Pleshivtsev	6	6
2	T Derepasko (Italy) J Vasamì	3	2

Quarterfinals
(United States) M Exsted (Czech Republic) J Kumstát	4	6^{5}
4	(Finland) O Paldanius (Poland) A Ważny	6	7^{7}
(South Africa) C Doig (India) K Tyagi	4	6^{8}
(Kazakhstan) A Omarkhanov; E Pleshivtsev	6	7^{10}

Semifinals
4	(Finland) O Paldanius (Poland) A Ważny	6	4	[10]
(Kazakhstan) A Omarkhanov; E Pleshivtsev	4	6	5

== Other entry information ==
=== Alternates ===
- (Japan) Shion Itsusaki / (India) Rethin Pranav Senthil Kumar

=== Withdrawals ===
- § (Brazil) João Pedro Didoni Bonini / (Japan) Ryo Tabata → replaced by (Japan) Shion Itsusaki / (India) Rethin Pranav Senthil Kumar

§ – withdrew from main draw
