= 2025 Wimbledon Championships – Mixed invitation doubles =

Tennis championship

Mixed invitation doubles
- 2025 Wimbledon Championships

Final
- Champions: (Sweden) Thomas Johansson (United Kingdom) Katie O'Brien
- Runners-up: (France) Sébastien Grosjean (Croatia) Iva Majoli
- Score: 6–2, 6–2

Events
Singles	men	women		boys	girls
Doubles	men	women	mixed	boys	girls
WC Singles	men	women	quad
WC Doubles	men	women	quad
Legends	men	women	mixed
14&U Singles	boys	girls
← 2024 ·	Wimbledon Championships	· 2026 →

Thomas Johansson and Katie O'Brien won the mixed invitation doubles title at the 2025 Wimbledon Championships, defeating Sébastien Grosjean and Iva Majoli in the final, 6–2, 6–2.

Mark Woodforde and Dominika Cibulková were the reigning champions, but Cibulková chose to compete in the Ladies' invitation doubles event instead. Woodforde partnered Barbara Schett, but they were eliminated in the round-robin competition.

== Draw ==
=== Final ===
Final
A4	(Sweden) Thomas Johansson (United Kingdom) Katie O'Brien	6	6
B4	(France) Sébastien Grosjean (Croatia) Iva Majoli	2	2

=== Group A ===
		(Australia) Woodbridge (Australia) Molik	(Iran) Bahrami (China) Zheng	(United Kingdom) Rusedski (Spain) Martínez	(Sweden) Johansson (United Kingdom) O'Brien	RR; W–L	Set; W–L	Game; W–L	Standings
A1	(Australia) Todd Woodbridge (Australia) Alicia Molik		7–5, 4–6, [11–9]	7–5, 0–0, ret.	1–6, 3–6	2–1	4–3	23–28	2
A2	(Iran) Mansour Bahrami (China) Zheng Jie	5–7, 6–4, [9–11]		3–6, 6–1, [6–10]	5–7, 6–3, [6–10]	0–3	3–6	31–31	4
A3	(United Kingdom) Greg Rusedski (Spain) Conchita Martínez	5–7, 0–0, ret.	6–3, 1–6, [10–6]		6–7^{(5–7)}, 3–6	1–2	2–5	22–29	3
A4	(Sweden) Thomas Johansson (United Kingdom) Katie O'Brien	6–1, 6–3	7–5, 3–6, [10–6]	7–6^{(7–5)}, 6–3		3–0	6–1	36–24	1

=== Group B ===
		(Australia) Woodforde (Austria) Schett	(Serbia) Zimonjić (United States) Navratilova	(France) Santoro (United Kingdom) Keothavong	(France) Grosjean (Croatia) Majoli	RR; W–L	Set; W–L	Game; W–L	Standings
B1	(Australia) Mark Woodforde (Austria) Barbara Schett		6–4, 6–4	4–6, 4–6	6–3, 3–6, [10–7]	2–1	4–3	30–29	3
B2	(Serbia) Nenad Zimonjić (United States) Martina Navratilova	4–6, 4–6		1–6, 1–6	w/o	0–3	0–6	10–24	4
B3	(France) Fabrice Santoro (United Kingdom) Anne Keothavong	6–4, 6–4	6–1, 6–1		4–6, 3–6	2–1	4–2	31–22	2
B4	(France) Sébastien Grosjean (Croatia) Iva Majoli	3–6, 6–3, [7–10]	w/o	6–4, 6–3		2–1	5–2	21–17	1
