= 2025 Wimbledon Championships – Wheelchair quad doubles =

Tennis championship

Wheelchair quad doubles
- 2025 Wimbledon Championships

Final
- Champions: (Israel) Guy Sasson (Netherlands) Niels Vink
- Runners-up: (South Africa) Donald Ramphadi (United Kingdom) Gregory Slade
- Score: 6–0, 6–2

Details
- Draw: 4
- Seeds: 2

Events
Singles	men	women		boys	girls
Doubles	men	women	mixed	boys	girls
WC Singles	men	women	quad
WC Doubles	men	women	quad
Legends	men	women	mixed
14&U Singles	boys	girls
- Wimbledon Championships

Three-time defending champion Niels Vink and his partner Guy Sasson defeated Donald Ramphadi and Gregory Slade in the final, 6–0, 6–2 to win the quad doubles wheelchair tennis title at the 2025 Wimbledon Championships.

Sam Schröder and Vink were the three-time reigning champions, but chose not to compete together. Schröder partnered Ahmet Kaplan, but lost in the semifinals to Ramphadi and Slade.

== Victory Speech ==
Describing Wimbledon, Guy Sasson referred to it as "the peak of the mountain," characterizing it as a goal pursued through years of rehabilitation, personal development, and intensive training. He concluded his victory speech with a quotation from the Hebrew Bible: "The people shall rise up as a great lion, and lift themselves like a young lion." (Numbers 23:24)

== Seeds ==
1. (Israel) Guy Sasson / (Netherlands) Niels Vink (champions)
2. (Turkey) Ahmet Kaplan / (Netherlands) Sam Schröder (semifinals)

== Draw ==
Key

- Q = Qualifier
- WC = Wild card
- LL = Lucky loser
- Alt = Alternate
- ITF = ITF entry
- PR = Protected ranking
- SR = Special ranking
- SE = Special exempt
- JE = Junior exempt
- JR = Junior Accelerator Programme entrant
- CO = College Accelerator Programme entrant
- NG = Next Gen Accelerator Program entrant
- w/o = Walkover
- r = Retired
- d = Defaulted

=== Finals ===
Semifinals
1	(Israel) Guy Sasson (Netherlands) Niels Vink	6	6
(Chile) Francisco Cayulef (United Kingdom) Andy Lapthorne	1	2
(South Africa) Donald Ramphadi (United Kingdom) Gregory Slade	7^{7}	1	7
2	(Turkey) Ahmet Kaplan (Netherlands) Sam Schröder	6^{5}	6	5

Final
1	(Israel) Guy Sasson (Netherlands) Niels Vink	6	6
(South Africa) Donald Ramphadi (United Kingdom) Gregory Slade	0	2

== Sources ==
- Entry list
- Draw
