= 2025 Wimbledon Championships – Wheelchair men's singles =

Tennis championship

Wheelchair men's singles
- 2025 Wimbledon Championships

Final
- Champion: (Japan) Tokito Oda
- Runner-up: (United Kingdom) Alfie Hewett
- Score: 3–6, 7–5, 6–2

Details
- Draw: 16
- Seeds: 4

Events
Singles	men	women		boys	girls
Doubles	men	women	mixed	boys	girls
WC Singles	men	women	quad
WC Doubles	men	women	quad
14&U Singles	boys	girls
Legends	men	women	mixed
- Wimbledon Championships

Tokito Oda defeated defending champion Alfie Hewett in the final, 3–6, 7–5, 6–2 to win the gentlemen's singles wheelchair tennis title at the 2025 Wimbledon Championships. It was his second Wimbledon singles title and sixth major singles title overall.

== Seeds ==
1. (Japan) Tokito Oda (champion)
2. (United Kingdom) Alfie Hewett (final)
3. (Spain) Martín de la Puente (semifinals)
4. (Argentina) Gustavo Fernández (semifinals)

== Draw ==
Key

- Q = Qualifier
- WC = Wild card
- LL = Lucky loser
- Alt = Alternate
- ITF = ITF entry
- PR = Protected ranking
- SR = Special ranking
- SE = Special exempt
- JE = Junior exempt
- JR = Junior Accelerator Programme entrant
- CO = College Accelerator Programme entrant
- NG = Next Gen Accelerator Program entrant
- w/o = Walkover
- r = Retired
- d = Defaulted

=== Finals ===
First round
1	(Japan) Tokito Oda	6	7
WC	(United Kingdom) Ben Bartram	2	5
(Netherlands) Ruben Spaargaren	6	6
(Japan) Takuya Miki	1	2
4	(Argentina) Gustavo Fernández	6	6
(France) Stéphane Houdet	1	2
(United Kingdom) Gordon Reid	5	6	7^{10}
(Belgium) Joachim Gérard	7	4	6^{6}
(Israel) Sergei Lysov	1	6^{1}
(United States) Casey Ratzlaff	6	7^{7}
WC	(United Kingdom) Dahnon Ward	2	0
3	(Spain) Martín de la Puente	6	6
(Netherlands) Tom Egberink	6	3	5
(China) Ji Zhenxu	3	6	7
(Spain) Daniel Caverzaschi	1	2
2	(United Kingdom) Alfie Hewett	6	6

Quarterfinals
1	(Japan) T Oda	6	6
(Netherlands) R Spaargaren	1	4
4	(Argentina) G Fernández	6	6
(United Kingdom) G Reid	2	3
(United States) C Ratzlaff	1	1
3	(Spain) M de la Puente	6	6
(China) Z Ji	1	1
2	(United Kingdom) A Hewett	6	6

Semifinals
1	(Japan) T Oda	7	6
4	(Argentina) G Fernández	5	1
3	(Spain) M de la Puente	0	5
2	(United Kingdom) A Hewett	6	7

Final
1	(Japan) T Oda	3	7	6
2	(United Kingdom) A Hewett	6	5	2

== Sources ==
- Entry list
- Draw
