= 2025 Wimbledon Championships – Wheelchair women's doubles =

Tennis championship

Wheelchair women's doubles
- 2025 Wimbledon Championships

Final
- Champions: (China) Li Xiaohui (China) Wang Ziying
- Runners-up: (Colombia) Angélica Bernal (France) Ksénia Chasteau
- Score: 6–3, 6–1

Details
- Draw: 8
- Seeds: 2

Events
| Singles | men | women | | boys | girls |
| Doubles | men | women | mixed | boys | girls |
| WC Singles | men | women | quad |
| WC Doubles | men | women | quad |
| Legends | men | women | mixed |
| 14&U Singles | boys | girls |
| ← 2024 · | Wimbledon Championships | · 2026 → |

Li Xiaohui and Wang Ziying defeated Angélica Bernal and Ksénia Chasteau in the final, 6–3, 6–1 to win the wheelchair ladies' doubles title at the 2025 Wimbledon Championships.

Yui Kamiji and Kgothatso Montjane were the defending champions, but lost in the quarterfinals to Li and Wang.

== Seeds ==
1. (Japan) Manami Tanaka / (China) Zhu Zhenzhen (first round)
2. (China) Li Xiaohui / (China) Wang Ziying (champions)

== Draw ==
=== Key ===
- Q = Qualifier
- WC = Wild card
- LL = Lucky loser
- Alt = Alternate
- ITF = ITF entry
- PR = Protected ranking
- SR = Special ranking
- SE = Special exempt
- JE = Junior exempt
- JR = Junior Accelerator Programme entrant
- CO = College Accelerator Programme entrant
- NG = Next Gen Accelerator Program entrant
- w/o = Walkover
- r = Retired
- d = Defaulted

=== Finals ===
Quarterfinals
1 | (Japan) Manami Tanaka (China) Zhu Zhenzhen | 3 | 6^{7}
(Colombia) Angélica Bernal (France) Ksénia Chasteau | 6 | 7^{9}
(Netherlands) Lizzy de Greef (Netherlands) Aniek van Koot | 4 | 3
(Netherlands) Diede de Groot (United Kingdom) Lucy Shuker | 6 | 6
(Netherlands) Jinte Bos (United Kingdom) Cornelia Oosthuizen | 4 | 7 | 4
(Chile) Macarena Cabrillana (Japan) Saki Takamuro | 6 | 5 | 6
(Japan) Yui Kamiji (South Africa) Kgothatso Montjane | 4 | 6^{4}
2 | (China) Li Xiaohui (China) Wang Ziying | 6 | 7^{7}

Semifinals
(Colombia) Angélica Bernal (France) Ksénia Chasteau | 6 | 6
(Netherlands) Diede de Groot (United Kingdom) Lucy Shuker | 3 | 4
(Chile) Macarena Cabrillana (Japan) Saki Takamuro | 2 | 2
2 | (China) Li Xiaohui (China) Wang Ziying | 6 | 6

Final
(Colombia) Angélica Bernal (France) Ksénia Chasteau | 3 | 1
2 | (China) Li Xiaohui (China) Wang Ziying | 6 | 6

== Sources ==
- Entry list
- Draw
