= 2025 Wimbledon Championships – Mixed doubles =

Tennis championship

Mixed doubles
- 2025 Wimbledon Championships

Final
- Champions: (Netherlands) Sem Verbeek (Czech Republic) Kateřina Siniaková
- Runners-up: (United Kingdom) Joe Salisbury (Brazil) Luisa Stefani
- Score: 7–6^{(7–3)}, 7–6^{(7–3)}
- Date: 10 July 2025

Details
- Draw: 32
- Seeds: 8

Events
Singles	men	women		boys	girls
Doubles	men	women	mixed	boys	girls
WC Singles	men	women	quad
WC Doubles	men	women	quad
14&U Singles	boys	girls
Legends	men	women	mixed
- Wimbledon Championships

Sem Verbeek and Kateřina Siniaková defeated Joe Salisbury and Luisa Stefani in the final, 7–6^{(7–3)}, 7–6^{(7–3)} to win the mixed doubles tennis title at the 2025 Wimbledon Championships. It was Verbeek's first major title, and Siniaková's eleventh. Verbeek became the first Dutchman to win the mixed doubles title at Wimbledon.

Jan Zieliński and Hsieh Su-wei were the defending champions, but lost in the quarterfinals to Salisbury and Stefani.

== Seeds ==
1. (Finland) Harri Heliövaara / (Kazakhstan) Anna Danilina (first round)
2. (El Salvador) Marcelo Arévalo / (China) Zhang Shuai (semifinals)
3. (Italy) Andrea Vavassori / (Italy) Sara Errani (second round)
4. (United States) Evan King / (United States) Taylor Townsend (second round)
5. (Croatia) Nikola Mektić / (Canada) Gabriela Dabrowski (first round)
6. (New Zealand) Michael Venus / (New Zealand) Erin Routliffe (first round)
7. (Germany) Kevin Krawietz / (Australia) Ellen Perez (first round)
8. (Croatia) Mate Pavić / (Hungary) Tímea Babos (semifinals)

== Draw ==
Key

- Q = Qualifier
- WC = Wild card
- LL = Lucky loser
- Alt = Alternate
- ITF = ITF entry
- PR = Protected ranking
- SR = Special ranking
- SE = Special exempt
- JE = Junior exempt
- JR = Junior Accelerator Programme entrant
- CO = College Accelerator Programme entrant
- NG = Next Gen Accelerator Program entrant
- w/o = Walkover
- r = Retired
- d = Defaulted

=== Finals ===
Semifinals
(Netherlands) Sem Verbeek (Czech Republic) Kateřina Siniaková	6	7
8	(Croatia) Mate Pavić (Hungary) Tímea Babos	3	5
(United Kingdom) Joe Salisbury (Brazil) Luisa Stefani	7^{8}	7^{7}
2	(El Salvador) Marcelo Arévalo (China) Zhang Shuai	6^{6}	6^{4}

Final
(Netherlands) Sem Verbeek (Czech Republic) Kateřina Siniaková	7^{7}	7^{7}
(United Kingdom) Joe Salisbury (Brazil) Luisa Stefani	6^{3}	6^{3}

=== Top half ===
First round
1	(Finland) H Heliövaara (Kazakhstan) A Danilina	2	7^{7}	1
(Netherlands) S Verbeek (Czech Republic) K Siniaková	6	6^{2}	6
WC	(United Kingdom) M Willis (United Kingdom) A Barnett	5	1
(Mexico) S González (Slovakia) T Mihalíková	7	6
(Netherlands) S Arends (Netherlands) D Schuurs	4	6	6^{5}
WC	(United Kingdom) J Paris (United Kingdom) E Silva	6	3	7^{10}
Alt	(United States) R Galloway (Indonesia) A Sutjiadi	4	6	6
5	(Croatia) N Mektić (Canada) G Dabrowski	6	4	3
3	(Italy) A Vavassori (Italy) S Errani	6	6
WC	(United Kingdom) J Cash (United Kingdom) H Watson	3	0
(United Kingdom) L Glasspool (Mexico) G Olmos	3	3
(United States) J Withrow; I Khromacheva	6	6
WC	(United Kingdom) J Murray (United Kingdom) E Appleton	3	4
WC	(United Kingdom) D Stevenson (United Kingdom) M Lumsden	6	6
(France) F Reboul (Norway) U Eikeri	4	6^{5}
8	(Croatia) M Pavić (Hungary) T Babos	6	7^{7}

Second round
(Netherlands) S Verbeek (Czech Republic) K Siniaková	7^{7}	6
(Mexico) S González (Slovakia) T Mihalíková	6^{2}	3
WC	(United Kingdom) J Paris (United Kingdom) E Silva	7^{7}	0
Alt	(United States) R Galloway (Indonesia) A Sutjiadi	6^{2}	0^{r}
3	(Italy) A Vavassori (Italy) S Errani	6	6^{6}	2
(United States) J Withrow; I Khromacheva	3	7^{8}	6
WC	(United Kingdom) D Stevenson (United Kingdom) M Lumsden	3	4
8	(Croatia) M Pavić (Hungary) T Babos	6	6

Quarterfinals
(Netherlands) S Verbeek (Czech Republic) K Siniaková	7^{7}	6
WC	(United Kingdom) J Paris (United Kingdom) E Silva	6^{5}	3
(United States) J Withrow; I Khromacheva	7^{7}	3	4
8	(Croatia) M Pavić (Hungary) T Babos	6^{5}	6	6

Semifinals
(Netherlands) S Verbeek (Czech Republic) K Siniaková	6	7
8	(Croatia) M Pavić (Hungary) T Babos	3	5

=== Bottom half ===
First round
6	(New Zealand) M Venus (New Zealand) E Routliffe	4	4
(United Kingdom) J Salisbury (Brazil) L Stefani	6	6
(United Kingdom) H Patten (United Kingdom) O Nicholls	3	4
(Argentina) A Molteni (United States) A Muhammad	6	6
(Poland) J Zieliński (Chinese Taipei) S-w Hsieh	6	6
(Argentina) M González (Spain) C Bucșa	3	4
(Australia) M Ebden (Latvia) J Ostapenko	2	6^{5}
4	(United States) E King (United States) T Townsend	6	7^{7}
7	(Germany) K Krawietz (Australia) E Perez	6^{2}	4
(United States) N Lammons; A Panova	7^{7}	6
(France) S Doumbia (Chinese Taipei) F-h Wu	1	6	3
(United Kingdom) N Skupski (United States) D Krawczyk	6	3	6
(India) Y Bhambri (China) X Jiang	6	1	7^{10}
(United States) C Harrison (United States) N Melichar-Martinez	3	6	6^{6}
(Sweden) A Göransson (Chinese Taipei) H-c Chan	4	1
2	(El Salvador) M Arévalo (China) S Zhang	6	6

Second round
(United Kingdom) J Salisbury (Brazil) L Stefani	7^{9}	7^{7}
(Argentina) A Molteni (United States) A Muhammad	6^{7}	6^{5}
(Poland) J Zieliński (Chinese Taipei) S-w Hsieh	6	5	6
4	(United States) E King (United States) T Townsend	4	7	3
(United States) N Lammons; A Panova	4	2
(United Kingdom) N Skupski (United States) D Krawczyk	6	6
(India) Y Bhambri (China) X Jiang	6^{6}	3
2	(El Salvador) M Arévalo (China) S Zhang	7^{8}	6

Quarterfinals
(United Kingdom) J Salisbury (Brazil) L Stefani	7^{9}	6
(Poland) J Zieliński (Chinese Taipei) S-w Hsieh	6^{7}	3
(United Kingdom) N Skupski (United States) D Krawczyk	5	6^{7}
2	(El Salvador) M Arévalo (China) S Zhang	7	7^{9}

Semifinals
(United Kingdom) J Salisbury (Brazil) L Stefani	7^{8}	7^{7}
2	(El Salvador) M Arévalo (China) S Zhang	6^{6}	6^{4}

== Other entry information ==
=== Wildcards ===
- (United Kingdom) Julian Cash / (United Kingdom) Heather Watson
- (United Kingdom) Jamie Murray / (United Kingdom) Emily Appleton
- (United Kingdom) Joshua Paris / (United Kingdom) Eden Silva
- (United Kingdom) David Stevenson / (United Kingdom) Maia Lumsden
- (United Kingdom) Marcus Willis / (United Kingdom) Alicia Barnett

=== Alternates ===
- (United States) Robert Galloway / (Indonesia) Aldila Sutjiadi

=== Withdrawals ===
- (France) Édouard Roger-Vasselin / (Germany) Laura Siegemund → replaced by (United States) Robert Galloway / (Indonesia) Aldila Sutjiadi
