= 2025 Wimbledon Championships – Wheelchair quad singles =

Tennis championship

Wheelchair quad singles
- 2025 Wimbledon Championships

Final
- Champion: (Netherlands) Niels Vink
- Runner-up: (Netherlands) Sam Schröder
- Score: 6–3, 6–3

Details
- Draw: 8
- Seeds: 2

Events
Singles	men	women		boys	girls
Doubles	men	women	mixed	boys	girls
WC Singles	men	women	quad
WC Doubles	men	women	quad
Legends	men	women	mixed
14&U Singles	boys	girls
← 2024 ·	Wimbledon Championships	· 2026 →

Two-time defending champion Niels Vink defeated Sam Schröder in a rematch of the previous year's final, 6–3, 6–3 to win the quad singles wheelchair tennis title at the 2025 Wimbledon Championships.

== Seeds ==
1. (Netherlands) Niels Vink (champion)
2. (Netherlands) Sam Schröder (final)

== Draw ==
=== Key ===
- Q = Qualifier
- WC = Wild card
- LL = Lucky loser
- Alt = Alternate
- ITF = ITF entry
- PR = Protected ranking
- SR = Special ranking
- SE = Special exempt
- JE = Junior exempt
- JR = Junior Accelerator Programme entrant
- CO = College Accelerator Programme entrant
- NG = Next Gen Accelerator Program entrant
- w/o = Walkover
- r = Retired
- d = Defaulted

=== Finals ===
Quarterfinals
1	(Netherlands) Niels Vink	6	6
(South Africa) Donald Ramphadi	0	1
(Turkey) Ahmet Kaplan	6	1	6
(United Kingdom) Andy Lapthorne	2	6	2
(Chile) Francisco Cayulef	6^{2}	6	4
WC	(United Kingdom) Gregory Slade	7^{7}	3	6
(Israel) Guy Sasson	7^{8}	6^{4}	2
2	(Netherlands) Sam Schröder	6^{6}	7^{7}	6

Semifinals
1	(Netherlands) Niels Vink	6	6
(Turkey) Ahmet Kaplan	1	0
WC	(United Kingdom) Gregory Slade	1	3
2	(Netherlands) Sam Schröder	6	6

Final
1	(Netherlands) Niels Vink	6	6
2	(Netherlands) Sam Schröder	3	3

== Sources ==
- Entry list
- Draw
