= 2025 French Open – Day-by-day summaries =

The 2025 French Open's day-by-day summaries and order of play for main draw matches on the three main tennis courts, starting from May 25 until June 8.

All times are in CEST.

== Day 1 (25 May) ==
A tribute of 14-time champion Rafael Nadal was inducted at Court Philippe Chatrier before the start of Shelton–Sonego match.

- Seeds out:
  - Men's singles: (Czech Republic) Tomáš Macháč [21], (United States) Brandon Nakashima [28], (United States) Alex Michelsen [32]
  - Women's singles: (Ukraine) Marta Kostyuk [26], (Canada) Leylah Fernandez [27], (United States) Peyton Stearns [28], (Czech Republic) Linda Nosková [29]
- Schedule of play

Matches on main courts
Matches on Court Philippe Chatrier (Center Court)
Event	Winner	Loser	Score
Women's singles - 1st round	Aryna Sabalenka [1]	Kamilla Rakhimova	6–1, 6–0
Women's singles - 1st round	(China) Zheng Qinwen [8]	Anastasia Pavlyuchenkova	6–4, 6–3
Men's singles - 1st round	(Italy) Lorenzo Musetti [8]	(Germany) Yannick Hanfmann [Q]	7–5, 6–2, 6–0
Men's singles - 1st round	(United States) Ben Shelton [13]	(Italy) Lorenzo Sonego	6–4, 4–6, 3–6, 6–2, 6–3
Matches on Court Suzanne Lenglen (Grandstand)
Event	Winner	Loser	Score
Women's singles - 1st round	(Ukraine) Elina Svitolina [13]	(Turkey) Zeynep Sönmez	6–1, 6–1
Men's singles - 1st round	(France) Giovanni Mpetshi Perricard [31]	(Belgium) Zizou Bergs	4–6, 6–3, 7–6^{(7–5)}, 6–4
Men's singles - 1st round	(United States) Frances Tiafoe [15]	Roman Safiullin	6–4, 7–5, 6–4
Women's singles - 1st round	(Italy) Jasmine Paolini [4]	(China) Yuan Yue	6–1, 4–6, 6–3
Matches on Court Simonne Mathieu
Event	Winner	Loser	Score
Men's singles - 1st round	(United States) Tommy Paul [12]	(Denmark) Elmer Møller [LL]	6–7^{(5–7)}, 6–2, 6–3, 6–1
Women's singles - 1st round	Diana Shnaider [11]	(Ukraine) Anastasiia Sobolieva [Q]	7–6^{(7–3)}, 6–2
Women's singles - 1st round	(Croatia) Donna Vekić [18]	Anna Blinkova	7–5, 6–7^{(4–7)}, 6–1
Men's singles - 1st round	(France) Quentin Halys	(Czech Republic) Tomáš Macháč [21]	7–6^{(7–4)}, 4–1, retired
Coloured background indicates a night match
Day matches began at 11 am (12 pm on Court Philippe Chatrier), whilst night match began at 8:15 pm CEST

== Day 2 (26 May) ==
- Seeds out:
  - Men's singles: (United States) Taylor Fritz [4], (Argentina) Francisco Cerúndolo [18]
  - Women's singles: (United States) Emma Navarro [9]

Schedule of play

Matches on main courts
Matches on Court Philippe Chatrier (Center Court)
Event	Winner	Loser	Score
Women's singles - 1st round	(Poland) Iga Świątek [5]	(Slovakia) Rebecca Šramková	6–3, 6–3
Women's singles - 1st round	(Spain) Paula Badosa [10]	(Japan) Naomi Osaka	6–7^{(1–7)}, 6–1, 6–4
Men's singles - 1st round	(France) Richard Gasquet [WC]	(France) Térence Atmane [WC]	6–2, 2–6, 6–3, 6–0
Men's singles - 1st round	(Italy) Jannik Sinner [1]	(France) Arthur Rinderknech	6–4, 6–3, 7–5
Matches on Court Suzanne Lenglen (Grandstand)
Event	Winner	Loser	Score
Women's singles - 1st round	(Spain) Jéssica Bouzas Maneiro	(United States) Emma Navarro [9]	6–0, 6–1
Men's singles - 1st round	(Spain) Carlos Alcaraz [2]	(Italy) Giulio Zeppieri [Q]	6–3, 6–4, 6–2
Women's singles - 1st round	(United States) Bernarda Pera	(France) Caroline Garcia	6–4, 6–4
Men's singles - 1st round	(France) Arthur Fils [14]	(Chile) Nicolás Jarry	6–3, 6–4, 6–7^{(6–8)}, 6–3
Matches on Court Simonne Mathieu
Event	Winner	Loser	Score
Men's singles - 1st round	(Norway) Casper Ruud [7]	(Spain) Albert Ramos Viñolas [Q]	6–3, 6–4, 6–2
Men's singles - 1st round	(Germany) Daniel Altmaier	(United States) Taylor Fritz [4]	7–5, 3–6, 6–3, 6–1
Women's singles - 1st round	(United Kingdom) Katie Boulter	(France) Carole Monnet [Q]	6–7^{(4–7)}, 6–1, 6–1
Women's singles - 1st round	(United States) Madison Keys [7]	(Australia) Daria Saville [Q]	6–2, 6–1
Coloured background indicates a night match
Day matches began at 11 am (12 pm on Court Philippe Chatrier), whilst night match began at 8:15 pm CEST

== Day 3 (27 May) ==
- Seeds out:
  - Men's singles: Daniil Medvedev [11], (Bulgaria) Grigor Dimitrov [16], (Canada) Félix Auger-Aliassime [29], (Poland) Hubert Hurkacz [30]
  - Women's singles: (Czech Republic) Karolína Muchová [14], (Brazil) Beatriz Haddad Maia [23], (Belgium) Elise Mertens [24], Anna Kalinskaya [30]
  - Men's doubles: (United States) Nathaniel Lammons / (United States) Jackson Withrow [11]
  - Women's doubles: (United States) Caroline Dolehide / (United States) Desirae Krawczyk [7], (Japan) Miyu Kato / (Indonesia) Aldila Sutjiadi [16]
- Schedule of play

Matches on main courts
Matches on Court Philippe Chatrier (Center Court)
Event	Winner	Loser	Score
Women's singles - 1st round	(United States) Sofia Kenin [31]	(France) Varvara Gracheva	6–3, 6–1
Women's singles - 1st round	(United States) Coco Gauff [2]	(Australia) Olivia Gadecki	6–2, 6–2
Men's singles - 1st round	(Serbia) Novak Djokovic [6]	(United States) Mackenzie McDonald	6–3, 6–3, 6–3
Men's singles - 1st round	(France) Gaël Monfils	(Bolivia) Hugo Dellien	4–6, 3–6, 6–1, 7–6^{(7–4)}, 6–1
Matches on Court Suzanne Lenglen (Grandstand)
Event	Winner	Loser	Score
Women's singles - 1st round	Mirra Andreeva [6]	(Spain) Cristina Bucșa	6–4, 6–3
Men's singles - 1st round	(Germany) Alexander Zverev [3]	(United States) Learner Tien	6–3, 6–3, 6–4
Women's singles - 1st round	(United States) Jessica Pegula [3]	(Romania) Anca Todoni	6–2, 6–4
Men's singles - 1st round	(United Kingdom) Jack Draper [5]	(Italy) Mattia Bellucci	3–6, 6–1, 6–4, 6–2
Matches on Court Simonne Mathieu
Event	Winner	Loser	Score
Men's singles - 1st round	(United Kingdom) Cameron Norrie	Daniil Medvedev [11]	7–5, 6–3, 4–6, 1–6, 7–5
Women's singles - 1st round	(Poland) Magdalena Fręch [25]	(Tunisia) Ons Jabeur	7–6^{(7–4)}, 6–0
Men's singles - 1st round	(France) Corentin Moutet	(France) Clément Tabur [Q]	6–3, 7–6^{(8–6)}, 6–3
Women's singles - 1st round	(United States) Alycia Parks	(Czech Republic) Karolína Muchová [14]	6–3, 2–6, 6–1
Coloured background indicates a night match
Day matches began at 11 am (12 pm on Court Philippe Chatrier), whilst night match began at 8:15 pm CEST

== Day 4 (28 May) ==
- Seeds out:
  - Men's singles: (Norway) Casper Ruud [7], (Greece) Stefanos Tsitsipas [20], (France) Giovanni Mpetshi Perricard [31]
  - Women's singles: Diana Shnaider [11], (Croatia) Donna Vekić [18]
  - Women's doubles: (United States) Sofia Kenin / (Ukraine) Lyudmyla Kichenok [8]
  - Mixed doubles: (United States) Asia Muhammad / (Argentina) Andrés Molteni [7]
- Schedule of play

Matches on main courts
Matches on Court Philippe Chatrier (Center Court)
Event	Winner	Loser	Score
Women's singles - 2nd round	(Italy) Jasmine Paolini [4]	(Australia) Ajla Tomljanović	6–3, 6–3
Men's singles - 2nd round	(Spain) Carlos Alcaraz [2]	(Hungary) Fábián Marozsán	6–1, 4–6, 6–1, 6–2
Women's singles - 2nd round	(Poland) Iga Świątek [5]	(United Kingdom) Emma Raducanu	6–1, 6–2
Men's singles - 2nd round (Note: This match was originally scheduled to play on Court Suzanne Lenglen but was moved to Court Philippe Chatrier following Hugo Gaston's withdrawal.)	(Denmark) Holger Rune [10]	(United States) Emilio Nava [WC]	6–3, 7–6^{(7–5)}, 6–3
Matches on Court Suzanne Lenglen (Grandstand)
Event	Winner	Loser	Score
Women's singles - 2nd round	(China) Zheng Qinwen [8]	(Colombia) Emiliana Arango	6–2, 6–3
Men's singles - 2nd round	(Portugal) Nuno Borges	(Norway) Casper Ruud [7]	2–6, 6–4, 6–1, 6–0
Men's singles - 2nd round (Note: This match was originally scheduled to play on Court 14 but was moved to Court Suzanne Lenglen after the Nava-Rune match was moved to Court Philippe Chatrier.)	(Bosnia and Herzegovina) Damir Džumhur	(France) Giovanni Mpetshi Perricard [31]	7–6^{(7–4)}, 6–3, 4–6, 6–4
Women's singles - 2nd round	Aryna Sabalenka [1]	(Switzerland) Jil Teichmann	6–3, 6–1
Matches on Court Simonne Mathieu
Event	Winner	Loser	Score
Men's singles - 2nd round	(Italy) Lorenzo Musetti [8]	(Colombia) Daniel Elahi Galán [LL]	6–4, 6–0, 6–4
Women's singles - 2nd round	(Ukraine) Elina Svitolina [13]	(Hungary) Anna Bondár	7–6^{(7–4)}, 7–5
Men's singles - 2nd round	(Italy) Matteo Gigante [Q]	(Greece) Stefanos Tsitsipas [20]	6–4, 5–7, 6–2, 6–4
Women's singles - 2nd round	(Kazakhstan) Elena Rybakina [12]	(United States) Iva Jovic [WC]	6–3, 6–3
Coloured background indicates a night match
Day matches began at 11 am (12 pm on Court Philippe Chatrier), whilst night match began at 8:15 pm CEST

== Day 5 (29 May) ==
- Seeds out:
  - Men's singles: (Australia) Alex de Minaur [9], (Czech Republic) Jakub Menšík [19], (France) Ugo Humbert [22], (Spain) Alejandro Davidovich Fokina [26], (Canada) Denis Shapovalov [27]
  - Women's singles: (Czech Republic) Barbora Krejčíková [15], (Poland) Magdalena Fręch [25]
  - Men's doubles: (Argentina) Máximo González / (Argentina) Andrés Molteni [10], (United Kingdom) Jamie Murray / (United States) Rajeev Ram [14]
  - Women's doubles: Irina Khromacheva / (Hungary) Fanny Stollár [11]
- Schedule of play

Matches on main courts
Matches on Court Philippe Chatrier (Center Court)
Event	Winner	Loser	Score
Women's singles - 2nd round	(United States) Jessica Pegula [3]	(United States) Ann Li	6–3, 7–6^{(7–3)}
Men's singles - 2nd round	(Italy) Jannik Sinner [1]	(France) Richard Gasquet [WC]	6–3, 6–0, 6–4
Women's singles - 2nd round	(United States) Madison Keys [7]	(United Kingdom) Katie Boulter	6–1, 6–3
Men's singles - 2nd round	(United Kingdom) Jack Draper [5]	(France) Gaël Monfils	6–3, 4–6, 6–3, 7–5
Matches on Court Suzanne Lenglen (Grandstand)
Event	Winner	Loser	Score
Men's singles - 2nd round	(France) Arthur Fils [14]	(Spain) Jaume Munar	7–6^{(7–3)}, 7–6^{(7–4)}, 2–6, 0–6, 6–4
Women's singles - 2nd round	(United States) Coco Gauff [2]	(Czech Republic) Tereza Valentová [Q]	6–2, 6–4
Men's singles - 2nd round	(Serbia) Novak Djokovic [6]	(France) Corentin Moutet	6–3, 6–2, 7–6^{(7–1)}
Women's singles - 2nd round	(Australia) Daria Kasatkina [17]	(France) Léolia Jeanjean [WC]	6–4, 6–2
Matches on Court Simonne Mathieu
Event	Winner	Loser	Score
Women's singles - 2nd round	Mirra Andreeva [6]	(United States) Ashlyn Krueger	6–3, 6–4
Men's singles - 2nd round	(Germany) Alexander Zverev [3]	(Netherlands) Jesper de Jong	3–6, 6–1, 6–2, 6–3
Women's singles - 2nd round	(Spain) Paula Badosa [10]	(Romania) Elena-Gabriela Ruse	3–6, 6–4, 6–4
Men's singles - 2nd round	(United Kingdom) Jacob Fearnley	(France) Ugo Humbert [22]	6–3, 4–4, retired
Men's doubles - 1st round	(Italy) Simone Bolelli [4] (Italy) Andrea Vavassori [4]	(France) Pierre-Hugues Herbert [WC] (France) Nicolas Mahut [WC]	7–6^{(7–2)}, 6–2
Coloured background indicates a night match
Day matches began at 11 am (12 pm on Court Philippe Chatrier), whilst night match began at 8:15 pm CEST

== Day 6 (30 May) ==
- Seeds out:
  - Men's singles: (United States) Sebastian Korda [23], Karen Khachanov [24]
  - Women's singles: (Latvia) Jeļena Ostapenko [21], (Denmark) Clara Tauson [22]
  - Men's doubles: (Croatia) Nikola Mektić / (New Zealand) Michael Venus [7], (France) Sadio Doumbia / (France) Fabien Reboul [13]
  - Mixed doubles: (Czech Republic) Kateřina Siniaková / (United States) Rajeev Ram [8]
- Schedule of play

Matches on main courts
Matches on Court Philippe Chatrier (Center Court)
Event	Winner	Loser	Score
Women's singles - 3rd round	Aryna Sabalenka [1]	(Serbia) Olga Danilović	6–2, 6–3
Men's singles - 3rd round	(Denmark) Holger Rune [10]	(France) Quentin Halys	4–6, 6–2, 5–7, 7–5, 6–2
Women's singles - 3rd round	(Italy) Jasmine Paolini [4]	(Ukraine) Yuliia Starodubtseva [LL]	6–4, 6–1
Men's singles - 3rd round	(Spain) Carlos Alcaraz [2]	(Bosnia and Herzegovina) Damir Džumhur	6–1, 6–3, 4–6, 6–4
Matches on Court Suzanne Lenglen (Grandstand)
Event	Winner	Loser	Score
Men's singles - 3rd round	(Italy) Lorenzo Musetti [8]	(Argentina) Mariano Navone	4–6, 6–4, 6–3, 6–2
Women's singles - 3rd round	(Poland) Iga Świątek [5]	(Romania) Jaqueline Cristian	6–2, 7–5
Women's singles - 3rd round	(Kazakhstan) Elena Rybakina [12]	(Latvia) Jeļena Ostapenko [21]	6–2, 6–2
Men's singles - 3rd round	(United States) Frances Tiafoe [15]	(United States) Sebastian Korda [23]	7–6^{(8–6)}, 6–3, 6–4
Matches on Court Simonne Mathieu
Event	Winner	Loser	Score
Women's singles - 3rd round	(China) Zheng Qinwen [8]	(Canada) Victoria Mboko [Q]	6–3, 6–4
Men's singles - 3rd round	(United States) Tommy Paul [12]	Karen Khachanov [24]	6–3, 3–6, 7–6^{(9–7)}, 3–6, 6–3
Men's singles - 3rd round	(United States) Ben Shelton [13]	(Italy) Matteo Gigante [Q]	6–3, 6–3, 6–4
Women's singles - 3rd round	(Ukraine) Elina Svitolina [13]	(United States) Bernarda Pera	7–6^{(7–4)}, 7–6^{(7–5)}
Coloured background indicates a night match
Day matches began at 11 am (12 pm on Court Philippe Chatrier), whilst night match began at 8:15 pm CEST

== Day 7 (31 May) ==
- Seeds out:
  - Men's singles: (France) Arthur Fils [14]
  - Women's singles: (Spain) Paula Badosa [10], (United States) Sofia Kenin [31], (Kazakhstan) Yulia Putintseva [32]
  - Men's doubles: (Germany) Kevin Krawietz / (Germany) Tim Pütz [3], (Sweden) André Göransson / (Netherlands) Sem Verbeek [12]
  - Women's doubles: (Chinese Taipei) Hsieh Su-wei / (Latvia) Jeļena Ostapenko [3], (Chinese Taipei) Chan Hao-ching / (Mexico) Giuliana Olmos [9], (China) Jiang Xinyu / (Chinese Taipei) Wu Fang-hsien [10], (United States) Nicole Melichar-Martinez / Liudmila Samsonova [15]
  - Mixed doubles: (New Zealand) Erin Routliffe / (New Zealand) Michael Venus [5], (Kazakhstan) Anna Danilina / (Finland) Harri Heliövaara [6]
- Schedule of play

Matches on main courts
Matches on Court Philippe Chatrier (Center Court)
Event	Winner	Loser	Score
Women's singles - 3rd round	(United States) Jessica Pegula [3]	(Czech Republic) Markéta Vondroušová	3–6, 6–4, 6–2
Men's singles - 3rd round	(Germany) Alexander Zverev [3]	(Italy) Flavio Cobolli	6–2, 7–6^{(7–4)}, 6–1
Women's singles - 3rd round	(United States) Coco Gauff [2]	(Czech Republic) Marie Bouzková	6–1, 7–6^{(7–3)}
Men's singles - 3rd round	(Serbia) Novak Djokovic [6]	(Austria) Filip Misolic [Q]	6−3, 6−4, 6−2
Matches on Court Suzanne Lenglen (Grandstand)
Event	Winner	Loser	Score
Women's singles - 3rd round	Mirra Andreeva [6]	(Kazakhstan) Yulia Putintseva [32]	6–3, 6–1
Men's singles - 3rd round	(Italy) Jannik Sinner [1]	(Czech Republic) Jiří Lehečka	6–0, 6–1, 6–2
Men's singles - 3rd round (Note: This match was originally scheduled to play on Court Simonne Mathieu but was moved to Court Suzanne Lenglen following Arthur Fils's withdrawal.)	(United Kingdom) Jack Draper [5]	(Brazil) João Fonseca	6–2, 6–4, 6–2
Women's singles - 3rd round	(United States) Madison Keys [7]	(United States) Sofia Kenin [31]	4–6, 6–3, 7–5
Matches on Court Simonne Mathieu
Event	Winner	Loser	Score
Women's singles - 3rd round	(Australia) Daria Kasatkina [17]	(Spain) Paula Badosa [10]	6−1, 7−5
Women's singles - 3rd round	(France) Loïs Boisson [WC]	(France) Elsa Jacquemot [WC]	6–3, 0–6, 7–5
Men's singles - 3rd round (Note: This match was originally scheduled to play on Court 14 but was moved to Court Simonne Mathieu after the Fonseca-Draper match was moved to Court Suzanne Lenglen.)	(Kazakhstan) Alexander Bublik	(Portugal) Henrique Rocha [Q]	7–5, 6–1, 6–2
Men's singles - 3rd round	(United Kingdom) Cameron Norrie	(United Kingdom) Jacob Fearnley	6–3, 7–6^{(7–1)}, 6–2
Coloured background indicates a night match
Day matches began at 11 am (12 pm on Court Philippe Chatrier), whilst night match began at 8:15 pm CEST

== Day 8 (1 June) ==
- Seeds out:
  - Men's singles: (Denmark) Holger Rune [10], (United States) Ben Shelton [13], (Australia) Alexei Popyrin [25]
  - Women's singles: (Italy) Jasmine Paolini [4], (Kazakhstan) Elena Rybakina [12], (United States) Amanda Anisimova [16], Liudmila Samsonova [19]
  - Women's doubles: (Slovakia) Tereza Mihalíková / (United Kingdom) Olivia Nicholls [12]
- Schedule of play

Matches on main courts
Matches on Court Philippe Chatrier (Center Court)
Event	Winner	Loser	Score
Women's singles - 4th round	(Ukraine) Elina Svitolina [13]	(Italy) Jasmine Paolini [4]	4–6, 7–6^{(8–6)}, 6–1
Women's singles - 4th round	(Poland) Iga Świątek [5]	(Kazakhstan) Elena Rybakina [12]	1–6, 6–3, 7–5
Men's singles - 4th round	(Spain) Carlos Alcaraz [2]	(United States) Ben Shelton [13]	7–6^{(10–8)}, 6–3, 4–6, 6–4
Men's singles - 4th round	(Italy) Lorenzo Musetti [8]	(Denmark) Holger Rune [10]	7–5, 3–6, 6–3, 6–2
Matches on Court Suzanne Lenglen (Grandstand)
Event	Winner	Loser	Score
Men's singles - 4th round	(United States) Tommy Paul [12]	(Australia) Alexei Popyrin [25]	6–3, 6–3, 6–3
Women's singles - 4th round	(China) Zheng Qinwen [8]	Liudmila Samsonova [19]	7–6^{(7–5)}, 1–6, 6–3
Women's singles - 4th round	Aryna Sabalenka [1]	(United States) Amanda Anisimova [16]	7–5, 6–3
Men's singles - 4th round	(United States) Frances Tiafoe [15]	(Germany) Daniel Altmaier	6–3, 6–4, 7–6^{(7–4)}
Matches on Court Simonne Mathieu
Event	Winner	Loser	Score
Men's doubles - 3rd round	(Spain) Marcel Granollers [5] (Argentina) Horacio Zeballos [5]	(Mexico) Santiago González (United States) Austin Krajicek	6–2, 6–1
Women's doubles - 3rd round	Mirra Andreeva [4] Diana Shnaider [4]	(France) Caroline Garcia [WC] (France) Diane Parry [WC]	6–0, 7–5
Men's doubles - 3rd round	(Croatia) Ivan Dodig (Brazil) Orlando Luz	(Brazil) Fernando Romboli (Australia) John-Patrick Smith	4–6, 7–6^{(7–5)}, 6–4
Mixed doubles - 2nd round	(Germany) Laura Siegemund (France) Édouard Roger-Vasselin	(United States) Nicole Melichar-Martinez (United States) Christian Harrison	6–3, 4–6, [10–8]
Coloured background indicates a night match
Day matches began at 11 am, whilst night match began at 8:15 pm CEST

== Day 9 (2 June) ==
- Seeds out:
  - Men's singles: (United Kingdom) Jack Draper [5], Andrey Rublev [17]
  - Women's singles: (United States) Jessica Pegula [3], (Australia) Daria Kasatkina [17], Ekaterina Alexandrova [20]
  - Men's doubles: (El Salvador) Marcelo Arévalo / (Croatia) Mate Pavić [1], (Italy) Simone Bolelli / (Italy) Andrea Vavassori [4], (United Kingdom) Julian Cash / (United Kingdom) Lloyd Glasspool [6]
  - Women's doubles: (United States) Asia Muhammad / (Netherlands) Demi Schuurs [5], (Brazil) Beatriz Haddad Maia / (Germany) Laura Siegemund [13], (Hungary) Tímea Babos / (Brazil) Luisa Stefani [14]
- Schedule of play

Matches on main courts
Matches on Court Philippe Chatrier (Center Court)
Event	Winner	Loser	Score
Women's singles - 4th round	(United States) Coco Gauff [2]	Ekaterina Alexandrova [20]	6–0, 7–5
Women's singles - 4th round	(France) Loïs Boisson [WC]	(United States) Jessica Pegula [3]	3–6, 6–4, 6–4
Men's singles - 4th round	(Serbia) Novak Djokovic [6]	(United Kingdom) Cameron Norrie	6–2, 6–3, 6–2
Men's singles - 4th round	(Italy) Jannik Sinner [1]	Andrey Rublev [17]	6–1, 6–3, 6–4
Matches on Court Suzanne Lenglen (Grandstand)
Event	Winner	Loser	Score
Women's singles - 4th round	Mirra Andreeva [6]	(Australia) Daria Kasatkina [17]	6–3, 7–5
Men's singles - 4th round	(Germany) Alexander Zverev [3]	(Netherlands) Tallon Griekspoor	6–4, 3–0, retired
Women's singles - 4th round	(United States) Madison Keys [7]	(United States) Hailey Baptiste	6–3, 7–5
Men's singles - 4th round	(Kazakhstan) Alexander Bublik	(United Kingdom) Jack Draper [5]	5–7, 6–3, 6–2, 6–4
Matches on Court Simonne Mathieu
Event	Winner	Loser	Score
Men's doubles - 3rd round	(United Kingdom) Joe Salisbury [8] (United Kingdom) Neal Skupski [8]	(Portugal) Nuno Borges (France) Arthur Rinderknech	7–6^{(7–5)}, 6–4
Women's doubles - 3rd round	(Italy) Sara Errani [2] (Italy) Jasmine Paolini [2]	(Brazil) Beatriz Haddad Maia [13] (Germany) Laura Siegemund [13]	6–4, 6–3
Men's doubles - 3rd round	(Monaco) Hugo Nys [16] (France) Édouard Roger-Vasselin [16]	(El Salvador) Marcelo Arévalo [1] (Croatia) Mate Pavić [1]	1−6, 6–1, 6–4
Women's doubles - 3rd round	(Czech Republic) Kateřina Siniaková [1] (United States) Taylor Townsend [1]	(Hungary) Tímea Babos [14] (Brazil) Luisa Stefani [14]	6–7^{(6–8)}, 6–3, 6–4
Women's doubles - 3rd round	(Kazakhstan) Anna Danilina (Serbia) Aleksandra Krunić	(United States) Asia Muhammad [5] (Netherlands) Demi Schuurs [5]	6–4, 6–0
Coloured background indicates a night match
Day matches began at 11 am, whilst night match began at 8:15 pm CEST

== Day 10 (3 June) ==
- Seeds out:
  - Men's singles: (United States) Tommy Paul [12], (United States) Frances Tiafoe [15]
  - Women's singles: (China) Zheng Qinwen [8], (Ukraine) Elina Svitolina [13]
  - Men's doubles: (Finland) Harri Heliövaara / (United Kingdom) Henry Patten [2], (Australia) Matthew Ebden / (Australia) John Peers [15]
  - Women's doubles: Veronika Kudermetova / (Belgium) Elise Mertens [6]
  - Mixed doubles: (Ukraine) Lyudmyla Kichenok / (Croatia) Mate Pavić [1]
- Schedule of play

Matches on main courts
Matches on Court Philippe Chatrier (Center Court)
Event	Winner	Loser	Score
Women's singles - Quarterfinals	Aryna Sabalenka [1]	(China) Zheng Qinwen [8]	7–6^{(7–3)}, 6–3
Women's singles - Quarterfinals	(Poland) Iga Świątek [5]	(Ukraine) Elina Svitolina [13]	6–1, 7–5
Men's singles - Quarterfinals	(Italy) Lorenzo Musetti [8]	(United States) Frances Tiafoe [15]	6–2, 4–6, 7–5, 6–2
Men's singles - Quarterfinals	(Spain) Carlos Alcaraz [2]	(United States) Tommy Paul [12]	6–0, 6–1, 6–4
Matches on Court Suzanne Lenglen (Grandstand)
Event	Winner	Loser	Score
Women's doubles - Quarterfinals	(Italy) Sara Errani [2] (Italy) Jasmine Paolini [2]	Veronika Kudermetova [6] (Belgium) Elise Mertens [6]	6–2, 6–3
Women's doubles - Quarterfinals	Mirra Andreeva [4] Diana Shnaider [4]	(Serbia) Olga Danilović; Anastasia Potapova	6–3, 7–5
Women's Legends	(Slovakia) Daniela Hantuchová (Czech Republic) Lucie Šafářová	(Belgium) Kim Clijsters (Germany) Andrea Petkovic	6–4, 6–4
Mixed doubles - Quarterfinals	(United States) Desirae Krawczyk (United Kingdom) Neal Skupski	(Ukraine) Lyudmyla Kichenok [1] (Croatia) Mate Pavić [1]	6–3, 6–4
Matches on Court Simonne Mathieu
Event	Winner	Loser	Score
Men's doubles - Quarterfinals	(United States) Christian Harrison [9] (United States) Evan King [9]	(Finland) Harri Heliövaara [2] (United Kingdom) Henry Patten [2]	6–3, 6–4
Men's doubles - Quarterfinals	(United Kingdom) Joe Salisbury [8] (United Kingdom) Neal Skupski [8]	(Australia) Matthew Ebden [15] (Australia) John Peers [15]	6−7^{(4−7)}, 6−4, 6−4
Mixed doubles - Quarterfinals	(United States) Taylor Townsend [4] (United States) Evan King [4]	(Germany) Laura Siegemund (France) Édouard Roger-Vasselin	6–3, 6–4
Coloured background indicates a night match
Day matches began at 11 am, whilst night match began at 8:15 pm CEST

== Day 11 (4 June) ==
- Seeds out:
  - Men's singles: (Germany) Alexander Zverev [3]
  - Women's singles: Mirra Andreeva [6], (United States) Madison Keys [7]
  - Women's doubles: (Czech Republic) Kateřina Siniaková / (United States) Taylor Townsend [1]
  - Mixed doubles: (China) Zhang Shuai / (El Salvador) Marcelo Arévalo [2]
- Schedule of play

Matches on main courts
Matches on Court Philippe Chatrier (Center Court)
Event	Winner	Loser	Score
Women's singles - Quarterfinals	(United States) Coco Gauff [2]	(United States) Madison Keys [7]	6–7^{(6–8)}, 6–4, 6–1
Women's singles - Quarterfinals	(France) Loïs Boisson [WC]	Mirra Andreeva [6]	7–6^{(8–6)}, 6–3
Men's singles - Quarterfinals	(Italy) Jannik Sinner [1]	(Kazakhstan) Alexander Bublik	6–1, 7–5, 6–0
Men's singles - Quarterfinals	(Serbia) Novak Djokovic [6]	(Germany) Alexander Zverev [3]	4–6, 6–3, 6–2, 6–4
Matches on Court Suzanne Lenglen (Grandstand)
Event	Winner	Loser	Score
Women's Legends	(France) Tatiana Golovin (France) Pauline Parmentier	(Slovakia) Daniela Hantuchová (Italy) Flavia Pennetta	7–5, 6–4
Women's doubles - Quarterfinals	(Kazakhstan) Anna Danilina (Serbia) Aleksandra Krunić	(Czech Republic) Kateřina Siniaková [1] (United States) Taylor Townsend [1]	7–5, 4–6, 6–2
Men's doubles - Quarterfinals	(Monaco) Hugo Nys [16] (France) Édouard Roger-Vasselin [16]	(Netherlands) Sander Arends (United Kingdom) Luke Johnson	6–4, 3–6, 6–2
Men's Legends	(France) Guy Forget (France) Michaël Llodra	(France) Henri Leconte (France) Jo-Wilfried Tsonga	6–2, 7–6^{(7–4)}
Mixed Legends	(Belgium) Kim Clijsters (France) Mansour Bahrami	(Estonia) Anett Kontaveit (France) Cédric Pioline	6–3, 6–4
Matches on Court Simonne Mathieu
Event	Winner	Loser	Score
Women's doubles - Quarterfinals	(Norway) Ulrikke Eikeri (Japan) Eri Hozumi	(Romania) Irina-Camelia Begu [Alt] (Belgium) Yanina Wickmayer [Alt]	6–4, 6–3
Men's doubles - Quarterfinals	(Spain) Marcel Granollers [5] (Argentina) Horacio Zeballos [5]	(Croatia) Ivan Dodig (Brazil) Orlando Luz	6–2, 7–6^{(7–4)}
Mixed doubles - Semifinals	(Italy) Sara Errani [3] (Italy) Andrea Vavassori [3]	(China) Zhang Shuai [2] (El Salvador) Marcelo Arévalo [2]	6−2, 6−3
Mixed doubles - Semifinals	(United States) Taylor Townsend [4] (United States) Evan King [4]	(United States) Desirae Krawczyk (United Kingdom) Neal Skupski	3–6, 7–6^{(7–2)}, [12–10]
Coloured background indicates a night match
Day matches began at 11 am, whilst night match began at 8:15 pm CEST

== Day 12 (5 June) ==
- Seeds out:
  - Women's singles: (Poland) Iga Świątek [5]
  - Men's doubles: (Monaco) Hugo Nys / (France) Édouard Roger-Vasselin [16]
  - Mixed doubles: (United States) Taylor Townsend / (United States) Evan King [4]
- Schedule of play

Matches on main courts
Matches on Court Philippe Chatrier (Center Court)
Event	Winner	Loser	Score
Mixed doubles - Final	(Italy) Sara Errani [3] (Italy) Andrea Vavassori [3]	(United States) Taylor Townsend [4] (United States) Evan King [4]	6−4, 6−2
Women's singles - Semifinals	Aryna Sabalenka [1]	(Poland) Iga Świątek [5]	7–6^{(7–1)}, 4−6, 6−0
Women's singles - Semifinals	(United States) Coco Gauff [2]	(France) Loïs Boisson [WC]	6–1, 6–2
Matches on Court Suzanne Lenglen (Grandstand)
Event	Winner	Loser	Score
Women's Legends	(United States) Lindsay Davenport (Germany) Andrea Petkovic	(Estonia) Anett Kontaveit (France) Nathalie Tauziat	7–6^{(8–6)}, 6–3
Wheelchair Women's singles - Quarterfinals	(China) Li Xiaohui	(France) Ksénia Chasteau	6–2, 6–1
Men's doubles - Semifinals	(Spain) Marcel Granollers [5] (Argentina) Horacio Zeballos [5]	(Monaco) Hugo Nys [16] (France) Édouard Roger-Vasselin [16]	6–7^{(5–7)}, 6–3, 6–4
Matches on Court Simonne Mathieu
Event	Winner	Loser	Score
Mixed Legends	(Belgium) Kim Clijsters (United States) John McEnroe	(Italy) Flavia Pennetta (France) Jo-Wilfried Tsonga	6–3, 6–4
Men's Legends	(France) Mansour Bahrami (France) Sébastien Grosjean	(France) Gilles Simon (Sweden) Mats Wilander	6–4, 6–3
Boys' doubles - Quarterfinals	(United States) Keaton Hance [3] (United States) Jack Kennedy [3]	(United States) Maxwell Exsted (Bulgaria) Alexander Vasilev	6–2, 6–4
Matches began at 11 am (12 pm on Court Philippe Chatrier and Court Simonne Mathieu)

== Day 13 (6 June) ==
- Seeds out:
  - Men's singles: (Serbia) Novak Djokovic [6], (Italy) Lorenzo Musetti [8]
  - Men's doubles: (United States) Christian Harrison / (United States) Evan King [9]
  - Women's doubles: Mirra Andreeva / Diana Shnaider [4]
- Schedule of play

Matches on main courts
Matches on Court Philippe Chatrier (Center Court)
Event	Winner	Loser	Score
Men's singles - Semifinals	(Spain) Carlos Alcaraz [2]	(Italy) Lorenzo Musetti [8]	4–6, 7–6^{(7–3)}, 6–0, 2–0, retired
Men's singles - Semifinals	(Italy) Jannik Sinner [1]	(Serbia) Novak Djokovic [6]	6–4, 7–5, 7–6^{(7–3)}
Matches on Court Suzanne Lenglen (Grandstand)
Event	Winner	Loser	Score
Wheelchair men's singles - Semifinals	(Japan) Tokito Oda [1]	(Spain) Martín de la Puente [3]	6–4, 6–4
Men's doubles - Semifinals	(United Kingdom) Joe Salisbury [8] (United Kingdom) Neal Skupski [8]	(United States) Christian Harrison [9] (United States) Evan King [9]	6–7^{(5–7)}, 6–3, 7–6^{(9–7)}
Matches on Court Simonne Mathieu
Event	Winner	Loser	Score
Mixed Legends	(France) Nathalie Dechy (France) Sébastien Grosjean	(France) Tatiana Golovin (France) Arnaud Clément	7–5, 6–2
Women's doubles - Semifinals	(Kazakhstan) Anna Danilina (Serbia) Aleksandra Krunić	(Norway) Ulrikke Eikeri (Japan) Eri Hozumi	6–7^{(5–7)}, 6–3, 7–5
Women's doubles - Semifinals	(Italy) Sara Errani [2] (Italy) Jasmine Paolini [2]	Mirra Andreeva [4] Diana Shnaider [4]	6–0, 6–1
Matches began at 11 am (2:30 pm on Court Philippe Chatrier) CEST

== Day 14 (7 June) ==
- Seeds out:
  - Women's singles: Aryna Sabalenka [1]
  - Men's doubles: (United Kingdom) Joe Salisbury / (United Kingdom) Neal Skupski [8]
- Schedule of play

Matches on main courts
Matches on Court Philippe Chatrier (Center Court)
Event	Winner	Loser	Score
Women's singles - Final	(United States) Coco Gauff [2]	Aryna Sabalenka [1]	6–7^{(5–7)}, 6–2, 6–4
Men's doubles - Final	(Spain) Marcel Granollers [5] (Argentina) Horacio Zeballos [5]	(United Kingdom) Joe Salisbury [8] (United Kingdom) Neal Skupski [8]	6–0, 6–7^{(5–7)}, 7–5
Matches on Court Suzanne Lenglen (Grandstand)
Event	Winner	Loser	Score
Wheelchair Women's singles - Final	(Japan) Yui Kamiji [1]	(Netherlands) Aniek van Koot [2]	6–2, 6–2
Wheelchair Men's singles - Final	(Japan) Tokito Oda [1]	(United Kingdom) Alfie Hewett [2]	6–4, 7–6^{(8–6)}
Wheelchair Men's doubles - Final	(United Kingdom) Alfie Hewett [1] (United Kingdom) Gordon Reid [1]	(France) Stéphane Houdet (Japan) Tokito Oda	6–4, 1–6, [10–7]
Matches on Court Simonne Mathieu
Event	Winner	Loser	Score
Girls' singles - Final	(Austria) Lilli Tagger	(United Kingdom) Hannah Klugman [8]	6–2, 6–0
Boys' singles - Final	(Germany) Niels McDonald	(Germany) Max Schönhaus	6–7^{(7–5)} 6–0, 6–3
Men's Legends	(United States) John Mcenroe (France) Jo-Wilfried Tsonga	(United States) Michael Chang (France) Gilles Simon	2–6, 6–0, [10–8]
Matches began at 11 am (3pm on Court Philippe Chatrier) CEST

== Day 15 (8 June) ==
- Seeds out:
  - Men's singles: (Italy) Jannik Sinner [1]
- Schedule of play

Matches on main courts
Matches on Court Philippe Chatrier (Center Court)
Event	Winner	Loser	Score
Women's Doubles Final	(Italy) Sara Errani [2] (Italy) Jasmine Paolini [2]	(Kazakhstan) Anna Danilina (Serbia) Aleksandra Krunić	6–4, 2–6, 6–1
Men's Singles Final	(Spain) Carlos Alcaraz [2]	(Italy) Jannik Sinner [1]	4–6, 6–7^{(4–7)}, 6–4, 7–6^{(7–3)}, 7–6^{(10–2)}
Matches on Court Suzanne Lenglen (Grandstand)
Event	Winner	Loser	Score
Men's Legends	(France) Mansour Bahrami (France) Arnaud Clément	(France) Michaël Llodra (France) Fabrice Santoro	6–7^{(5–7)}, 6–1, [13–11]
Matches began at 11 am CEST
