= 2025 in para-sports =

This article lists the para-sport events for the year 2025.

== Multi-event competitions ==
- 21–28 July 2025: 2025 European Para Youth Games in Istanbul. This was the seventh edition of the multi-sport event which were open to para-athletes, it also had the largest number of sports events contested and 640 competitors from 33 countries participated. The host nation, Turkey topped the medal table winning 77 medals including 22 gold medals, closely followed by Germany in second and Spain in third.
- 31 October–9 November 2025: 2025 Youth Parapan American Games in (Chile) Santiago.
- 17–24 November 2025: 2025 World AbilitySport Games in (Thailand) Nakhon Ratchasima.
- 7–14 December: 2025 Asian Youth Para Games in (United Arab Emirates) Dubai. This will be the fifth edition of the multi-sport event; it will also be the second time that Dubai hosted the event when it lasted hosted in 2017.

== Archery ==
- 2–7 July 2025: 2025 Asia Para Archery Championships in (China) Beijing.
- 22–28 September 2025: 2025 World Para Archery Championships in (South Korea) Gwangju.

== Athletics ==
=== 2025 World Para Athletics Championships ===
The 2025 World Para Athletics Championships were held from 27 September to 5 October 2025 at Jawaharlal Nehru Stadium, New Delhi, India. A total of 184 events were held with 1182 athletes participating across 8 paralympic classifications.

=== 2025 WPA Grand Prix ===
This was the 12th WPA (World Para Athletics) Grand Prix to be held.

- 10–13 February 2025: Dubai 2025 WPA Grand Prix in (United Arab Emirates) Dubai.
- 11–13 March 2025: New Delhi 2025 WPA Grand Prix in (India) New Delhi.
- 24–26 April 2025: Marrakech 2025 WPA Grand Prix in (Morocco) Marrakesh.
- 9–12 May 2025: Jalisco 2025 WPA Grand Prix in (Mexico) Jalisco.
- 16–19 May 2025: Cali 2025 WPA Grand Prix in (Colombia) Cali.
- 23–25 May 2025: Nottwil 2025 WPA Grand Prix in (Switzerland) Nottwil.
- 2–4 June 2025: Paris 2025 WPA Grand Prix in (France) Paris.
- 16–18 June 2025: Tunis 2025 WPA Grand Prix in (Tunisia) Tunis.
- 3–5 July 2025: Olomouc 2025 WPA Grand Prix in (Czech Republic) Olomouc.

== Goalball ==
- 26 July–6 August 2025: IBSA Goalball Americas Championships in São Paulo. Brazil won both the men's and women's teams titles earning their qualification slot into the 2026 IBSA Goalball World Championships.
- 28 September–6 October 2025: IBSA Goalball European Championships in (Finland) Lahti. Turkey won both the men's and women's teams titles earning their qualification slot into the 2026 IBSA Goalball World Championships.
- 13–22 October 2025: IBSA Goalball Asia/Pacific Championships in (Pakistan) Islamabad.
- 4–11 December 2025: IBSA Goalball African Championships in (Egypt) Giza.

== Ice-hockey ==
=== 2025 World Para Ice Hockey Championships ===
The 2025 World Para Ice Hockey Championships was held in Buffalo, New York, United States from 24 to 31 May. The United States won their seventh title, defeating Canada 6–1 in the final.

== Shooting sports ==
- 2025 World Shooting Para Sport (WSPS) competition calendar here.

=== World/Continental Championships ===
- 9–15 September 2025: 2025 Para Trap World Championships in (Czech Republic) Brno.
- 30 September–8 October 2025: 2025 WSPS European Championships in (Croatia) Osijek.

=== World Cups ===
- 28 May–6 June 2025: Changwon 2025 WSPS World Cup in (South Korea) Changwon.
- 25 October–5 November 2025: Al Ain 2025 WSPS World Cup in (United Arab Emirates) Al Ain.

== Table tennis ==
=== Continental championships ===
- 26–28 September: ITTF Oceania Para Championships in (New Zealand) Auckland.
- 9–12 October: ITTF Pan American Para Championships in (Brazil) São Paulo.
- 14–19 October: ITTF Asian Para Championships in (China) Beijing.
- 20–23 November: ITTF African Para Championships in (Egypt) Cairo.
- 20–25 November: ITTF European Para Championships in (Sweden) Helsingborg.

== Wheelchair fencing ==
=== World Championships ===
- 2–7 September 2025: 2025 Para Fencing World Championships in (South Korea) Iksan.

=== World Cups ===
- 20–23 February 2025: 2025 Para Fencing World Cup in (Brazil) São Paulo.
- 13–16 March 2025: 2025 Para Fencing World Cup in (Italy) Pisa.
- 15–18 May 2025: 2025 Para Fencing World Cup in (Hungary) Eger.
- 15–18 September 2025: Para Fencing World Cup in (Indonesia) Surakarta.
- 20–23 November 2025: Para Fencing World Cup in (Thailand) Nakhon Ratchasima.

== Wheelchair tennis ==
=== Grand Slams ===
- 2025 Australian Open
  - Singles: (United Kingdom) Alfie Hewett (m) / (Japan) Yui Kamiji (f) / (Netherlands) Sam Schroder (q)
  - Doubles: (United Kingdom) Alfie Hewett & (United Kingdom) Gordon Reid (m) / (China) Li Xiaohui & (China) Wang Ziying (f) / (United Kingdom) Andy Lapthorne & (Netherlands) Sam Schroder (q)
- 2025 French Open
  - Singles: (Japan) Tokito Oda (m) / (Japan) Yui Kamiji (f) / (Israel) Guy Sasson (q)
  - Doubles: (United Kingdom) Alfie Hewett & (United Kingdom) Gordon Reid (m) / (Japan) Yui Kamiji & (South Africa) Kgothatso Montjane (f) / (Israel) Guy Sasson & (Netherlands) Niels Vink (q)
- 2025 Wimbledon Championships
  - Singles: (Japan) Tokito Oda (m) / (China) Wang Ziying (f) / (Netherlands) Niels Vink (q)
  - Doubles: (Spain) Martin de la Puente & (Netherlands) Ruben Spaargaren (m) / (China) Li Xiaohui & (China) Wang Ziying (f) / (Israel) Guy Sasson & (Netherlands) Niels Vink (q)
- 2025 US Open
  - Singles: (Japan) Tokito Oda (m) / (Japan) Yui Kamiji (f) / (Netherlands) Niels Vink (q)
  - Doubles: (Argentina) Gustavo Fernandez & (Japan) Tokito Oda (m) / (China) Li Xiaohui & (China) Wang Ziying (f) / (Israel) Guy Sasson & (Netherlands) Niels Vink (q)

=== Junior Grand Slam ===
- 2025 Australian Open
  - Singles: (United States) Charlie Cooper (b) / (Brazil) Vitoria Miranda (g)
  - Doubles: (Brazil) Luiz Calixto & (United States) Charlie Cooper (b) / (Belgium) Luna Gryp & (Brazil) Vitoria Miranda (g)
- 2025 French Open
  - Singles: (Austria) Maximilian Taucher (b) / (Brazil) Vitoria Miranda (g)
  - Doubles: (United States) Charlie Cooper & (Austria) Maximilian Taucher (b) / (Belgium) Luna Gryp & (Brazil) Vitoria Miranda (g)
- 2025 US Open
  - Singles: (Austria) Maximilian Taucher (b) / (United States) Sabina Czauz (g)
  - Doubles: (United Kingdom) Ruben Harris & (Austria) Maximilian Taucher (b) / (United States) Sabina Czauz & (Japan) Seira Matsuoka (g)
