= Thijs Boogaard =

Dutch tennis player (born 2008)

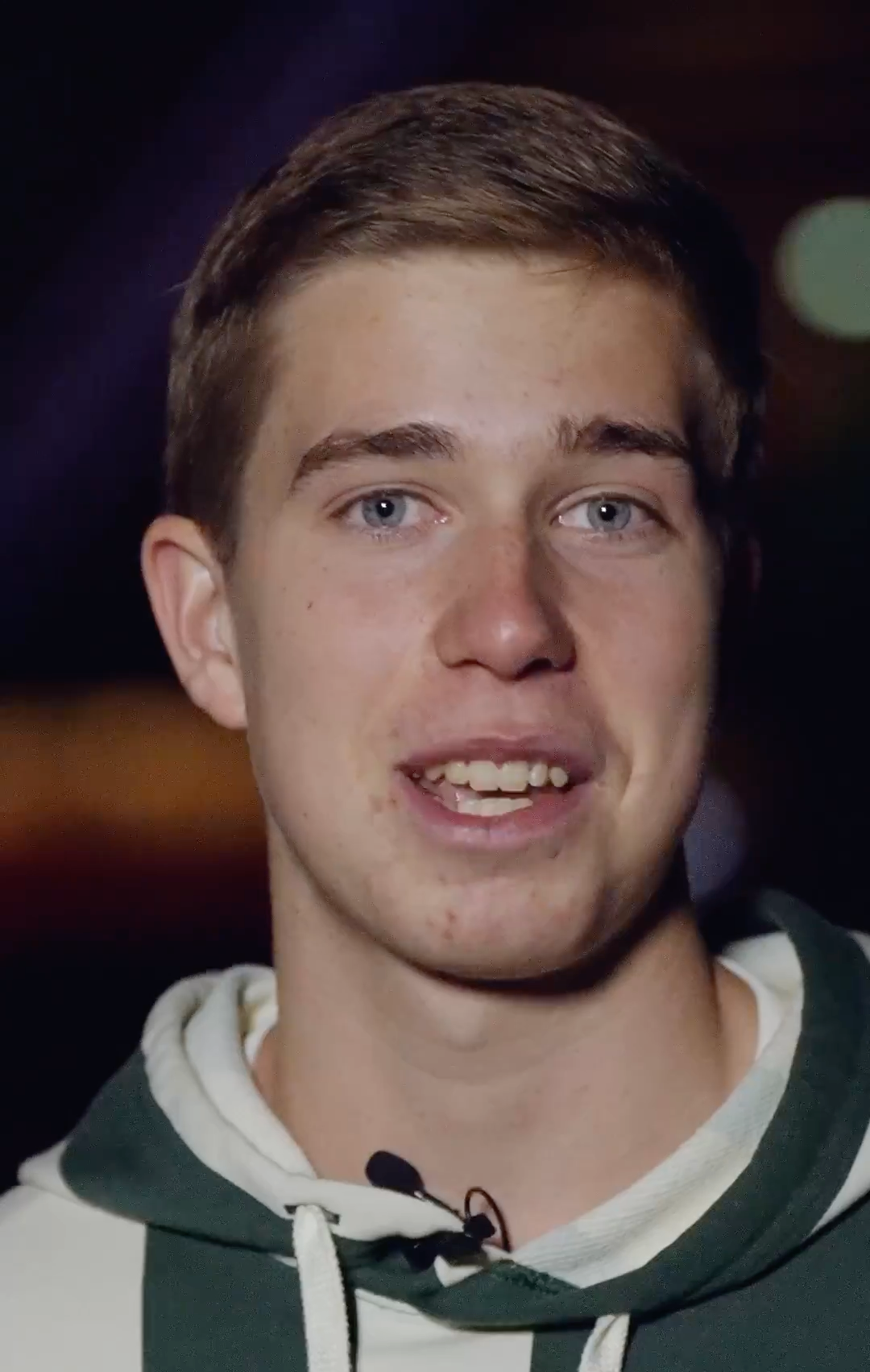
- Boogaard in 2024
- Country (sports): Netherlands
- Residence: Monte Carlo, Monaco
- Born: 5 July 2008 (age 18) Tiel, Netherlands
- Height: 1.83 m (6 ft 0 in)
- Turned pro: 2023
- Plays: Right-handed (two-handed backhand)
- Coach: Bjorn Graven
- Prize money: US $65,152

Singles
- Career record: 1–2 (at ATP Tour level, Grand Slam level, and in Davis Cup)
- Career titles: 0
- Highest ranking: No. 454 (16 November 2026)
- Current ranking: No. 454 (16 November 2026)

Grand Slam singles results
- Australian Open Junior: 2R (2024)
- French Open Junior: 2R (2023, 2025)
- Wimbledon Junior: SF (2026)

Doubles
- Career record: 0–0 (at ATP Tour level, Grand Slam level, and in Davis Cup)
- Career titles: 0

Grand Slam doubles results
- Australian Open Junior: 1R (2024)
- French Open Junior: QF (2025)
- Wimbledon Junior: 1R (2023)
- Last updated on: 16 November 2026.

Thijs Boogaard (born 5 July 2008) is a Dutch professional tennis player. He has a career-high ATP singles ranking of No. 454 achieved on 16 November 2026.

== Early life ==
From Geldermalsen, Boogaard lived in Hong Kong between the ages of two and nine. He began to be coached by Bjorn Graven in 2018. He splits his time between his local club in Beneden-Leeuwen, and the National Training Center of the tennis association KNLTB in Amstelveen, as well as the House of Tennis tennis school in Arnhem. He also trains occasionally at the Mouratoglou Academy in France. In 2022, he won the European Championships at under-14 level, and won the prestigious French youth tournament Les Petits As.

== Junior career ==
Boogaard has significant results on the ITF junior circuit, holding a singles win-loss record of 114–28 as of February 2026. Between October 2022 and February 2023, he went unbeaten on the junior circuit, winning six consecutive junior titles. He won his sixth consecutive junior title at the J300 San Jose, Costa Rica, where he beat Roy Horovitz in the boys' final. He also became the youngest player in history to win a Grade 1 junior tournament, beating by four months the record set by Bernard Tomic, who was 14 years 10 months, when he won a Grade 1 event in Kentucky, United States in September 2007. Boogaard's run of 30 consecutive match junior victories came to an end at the J300 Salinas, Ecuador by top-seed Henry Searle.

He competed at the junior 2023 French Open in 2023, as a fourteen-year-old, and at the 2023 Wimbledon Championships junior competition in 2023 as a fifteen-year-old.

Boogaard reached the quarterfinals in the boys' doubles at the 2025 French Open, playing alongside Ivan Ivanov. The pair lost to second seeds and eventual champions Oskari Paldanius and Alan Ważny. In July, he reached again a major quarterfinal, this time at the 2025 Wimbledon Championships in the boys' singles category, recording a win over Jagger Leach before losing to Alexander Vasilev. In December 2025, the young Dutch won the prestigious Orange Bowl in Florida, defeating home favourite Jack Kennedy in straight sets.

He reached an ITF junior combined ranking of world No. 9 on 5 January 2026. In July 2026, he was a semifinalist in Juniors singles at the 2026 Wimbledon Championships, losing to Australian Cruz Hewitt.

== Professional career ==
In June 2023, Boogaard defeated his countryman Stian Klaassen at a M15 event in Alkmaar and in doing so, became the fifth youngest in history to win a professional men's match.

Boogaard received a wildcard into qualifying for the 2024 ABN AMRO Open in Rotterdam in February 2024, where he lost against Hugo Gaston.

In June 2025, Boogaard was awarded a wildcard into the qualifying for the men's singles at the 2025 Libéma Open in 's-Hertogenbosch, Netherlands. He recorded a three-set win over world No. 180 James McCabe in the first round before facing Mackenzie McDonald in the final round.

In February 2026, Boogaard was awarded a wildcard into qualifying for the 2026 ABN AMRO Open in Rotterdam, but lost in the second round of qualifying to Hugo Grenier of France. However, after a late withdrawal by Aleksandar Vukic, he made his ATP main draw debut as a lucky loser against Stan Wawrinka. The 23 years and three months separating 40 year-old Wawrinka and 17 year-old Boogaard placed the match as having the second-largest age gap in ATP Tour and Grand Slam history behind Dominic Thiem’s 2011 win over Thomas Muster. In June, he recorded his first win on the ATP Tour at the 2026 Libéma Open in 's-Hertogenbosch with a victory against Wu Yibing in three sets. Aged 17 and 11 months, he was the second-youngest winner at the event after Sjeng Schalken in 1994.

== ITF World Tennis Tour finals ==
=== Singles: 1 (title) ===
Legend ITF World Tennis (1–0)	Finals by surface Hard (1–0)

Result	W–L	Date	Tournament	Surface	Opponent	Score
Win	1–0	Jun 2026	M25 Lourinha, Portugal	Hard	(Portugal) Tiago Torres	7–5, 2–6, 7–5
