= 2025 French Open – Wheelchair women's doubles =

Wheelchair women's doubles
- 2025 French Open

Final
- Champions: (Japan) Yui Kamiji (South Africa) Kgothatso Montjane
- Runners-up: (China) Li Xiaohui (China) Wang Ziying
- Score: 4–6, 7–5, [10–7]

Events
Singles	men	women		boys	girls
Doubles	men	women	mixed	boys	girls
WC Singles	men	women	quad	boys	girls
WC Doubles	men	women	quad	boys	girls
- French Open

Yui Kamiji and Kgothatso Montjane defeated Li Xiaohui and Wang Ziying in the final, 4–6, 7–5, [10–7] to win the women's doubles wheelchair tennis title at the 2025 French Open.

Diede de Groot and Aniek van Koot were the defending champions, but chose not to compete together this year. De Groot partnered Ksénia Chasteau, but lost in the quarterfinals to Kamiji and Montjane. Van Koot partnered Pauline Déroulède, but lost in the semifinals to Li and Wang.

== Seeds ==
1. (Japan) Manami Tanaka / (China) Zhu Zhenzhen (semifinals)
2. (China) Li Xiaohui / (China) Wang Ziying (final)

== Draw ==
Key

- Q = Qualifier
- WC = Wild card
- LL = Lucky loser
- Alt = Alternate
- ITF = ITF entry
- PR = Protected ranking
- SR = Special ranking
- SE = Special exempt
- JE = Junior exempt
- JR = Junior Accelerator Programme entrant
- CO = College Accelerator Programme entrant
- NG = Next Gen Accelerator Program entrant
- w/o = Walkover
- r = Retired
- d = Defaulted

=== Draw ===
Quarterfinals
1	(Japan) Manami Tanaka (China) Zhu Zhenzhen	7^{7}	5	[10]
(Colombia) Angélica Bernal (Netherlands) Lizzy de Greef	6^{3}	7	[4]
(France) Ksénia Chasteau (Netherlands) Diede de Groot	0	3
(Japan) Yui Kamiji (South Africa) Kgothatso Montjane	6	6
(France) Pauline Déroulède (Netherlands) Aniek van Koot	1	6	[10]
(Chile) Macarena Cabrillana (Japan) Saki Takamuro	6	4	[3]
Alt	(Netherlands) Jinte Bos (France) Charlotte Fairbank	2	4
2	(China) Li Xiaohui (China) Wang Ziying	6	6

Semifinals
1	(Japan) Manami Tanaka (China) Zhu Zhenzhen	1	4
(Japan) Yui Kamiji (South Africa) Kgothatso Montjane	6	6
(France) Pauline Déroulède (Netherlands) Aniek van Koot	6	5	[5]
2	(China) Li Xiaohui (China) Wang Ziying	4	7	[10]

Final
(Japan) Yui Kamiji (South Africa) Kgothatso Montjane	4	7	[10]
2	(China) Li Xiaohui (China) Wang Ziying	6	5	[7]
