= 2025 French Open – Wheelchair boys' doubles =

Wheelchair boys' doubles
- 2025 French Open

Final
- Champions: (United States) Charlie Cooper (Austria) Maximilian Taucher
- Runners-up: (Brazil) Luiz Calixto (Belgium) Alexander Lantermann
- Score: 6–4, 6–0

Events
Singles	men	women		boys	girls
Doubles	men	women	mixed	boys	girls
WC Singles	men	women	quad	boys	girls
WC Doubles	men	women	quad	boys	girls
- French Open

American Charlie Cooper teamed up with Austrian Maximilian Taucher to defeat Brazil's Luiz Calixto and Belgium's Alexander Lantermann 6–4, 6–0 to win the Wheelchair Boys' Doubles trophy.

== Draw ==
Key

- Q = Qualifier
- WC = Wild card
- LL = Lucky loser
- Alt = Alternate
- ITF = ITF entry
- PR = Protected ranking
- SR = Special ranking
- SE = Special exempt
- JE = Junior exempt
- JR = Junior Accelerator Programme entrant
- CO = College Accelerator Programme entrant
- NG = Next Gen Accelerator Program entrant
- w/o = Walkover
- r = Retired
- d = Defaulted

=== Final ===
Final
(Brazil) Luiz Calixto (Belgium) Alexander Lantermann	4	0
(United States) Charlie Cooper (Austria) Maximilian Taucher	6	6
