= 2025 French Open – Girls' singles =

Girls' singles
- 2025 French Open

Final
- Champion: (Austria) Lilli Tagger
- Runner-up: (United Kingdom) Hannah Klugman
- Score: 6–2, 6–0

Events
Singles	men	women		boys	girls
Doubles	men	women	mixed	boys	girls
WC Singles	men	women	quad	boys	girls
WC Doubles	men	women	quad	boys	girls
- French Open

Lilli Tagger defeated Hannah Klugman in the final, 6–2, 6–0 to win the girls' singles title at the 2025 French Open. Tagger was the first Austrian player to win a junior girls' singles Grand Slam title, and she did not lose a set en route.

Tereza Valentová was the defending champion, but played in the women's singles competition, where she lost to Coco Gauff in the second round.

== Seeds ==
1. (Australia) Emerson Jones (semifinals)
2. (United States) Kristina Penickova (first round)
3. (Belgium) Jeline Vandromme (first round)
4. (Serbia) Teodora Kostović (first round)
5. (Czech Republic) Tereza Krejčová (first round)
6. (Serbia) Luna Vujović (first round)
7. (Czech Republic) Jana Kovačková (second round)
8. (United Kingdom) Hannah Klugman (final)
9. (United States) Julieta Pareja (quarterfinals)
10. (Czech Republic) Alena Kovačková (third round)
11. (China) Zhang Ruien (third round)
12. (Germany) Julia Stusek (quarterfinals)
13. (Spain) Charo Esquiva Bañuls (third round)
14. (United States) Annika Penickova (first round)
15. (United States) Thea Frodin (second round)
16. (Lithuania) Laima Vladson (third round)

Click on the seed number of a player to go to their draw section.

== Draw ==
Key

- Q = Qualifier
- WC = Wild card
- LL = Lucky loser
- Alt = Alternate
- ITF = ITF entry
- PR = Protected ranking
- SR = Special ranking
- SE = Special exempt
- JE = Junior exempt
- JR = Junior Accelerator Programme entrant
- CO = College Accelerator Programme entrant
- NG = Next Gen Accelerator Program entrant
- w/o = Walkover
- r = Retired
- d = Defaulted

=== Finals ===
Quarterfinals
1	(Australia) Emerson Jones	7	6
9	(United States) Julieta Pareja	5	4
(Austria) Lilli Tagger	6	6
12	(Germany) Julia Stusek	0	4
8	(United Kingdom) Hannah Klugman	3	6	7
Q	(Czech Republic) Sarah Melany Fajmonová	6	3	5
(Argentina) Luna María Cinalli	0	5
(Bulgaria) Rositsa Dencheva	6	7

Semifinals
1	(Australia) Emerson Jones	4	6^{5}
(Austria) Lilli Tagger	6	7^{7}
8	(United Kingdom) Hannah Klugman	1	6	6
(Bulgaria) Rositsa Dencheva	6	3	3

Final
(Austria) Lilli Tagger	6	6
8	(United Kingdom) Hannah Klugman	2	0

=== Top half ===
==== Section 1 ====
First round
1	(Australia) Emerson Jones	6	1	6
Q	(United States) Capucine Jauffret	1	6	2
(Czech Republic) Vendula Valdmannová	4	6	6
(Canada) Nadia Lagaev	6	2	2
(Argentina) Sol Ailin Larraya Guidi	0	1
(Bulgaria) Elizara Yaneva	6	6
WC	(France) Margot Phanthala	1	5
13	(Spain) Charo Esquiva Bañuls	6	7
9	(United States) Julieta Pareja	6	6
(Turkey) Deniz Dilek	3	3
(Japan) Reina Goto	2	6	6^{8}
(Germany) Eva Bennemann	6	4	7^{10}
(Brazil) Victoria Luiza Barros	6	5	6
WC	(France) Eleejah Inisan	3	7	2
(Ukraine) Yelyzaveta Kotliar	4	6	5
7	(Czech Republic) Jana Kovačková	6	2	7

Second round
1	(Australia) E Jones	6	2	6
(Czech Republic) V Valdmannová	1	6	4
(Bulgaria) E Yaneva	4	2
13	(Spain) C Esquiva Bañuls	6	6
9	(United States) J Pareja	6	6
(Germany) E Bennemann	2	3
(Brazil) VL Barros	4	6	6
7	(Czech Republic) J Kovačková	6	3	3

Third round
1	(Australia) E Jones	7	6
13	(Spain) C Esquiva Bañuls	5	3
9	(United States) J Pareja	6	6
(Brazil) VL Barros	2	2

Quarterfinals
1	(Australia) E Jones	7	6
9	(United States) J Pareja	5	4

==== Section 2 ====
First round
3	(Belgium) Jeline Vandromme	4	4
(Austria) Lilli Tagger	6	6
(Romania) Giulia Safina Popa	7^{7}	6
(Slovakia) Kali Šupová	6^{1}	2
WC	(France) Nehira Sanon	7	1	1
(Czech Republic) Julie Paštiková	5	6	6
(Sweden) Nellie Taraba Wallberg	6	3	6
14	(United States) Annika Penickova	2	6	2
12	(Germany) Julia Stusek	6	1	7^{12}
(China) Sun Xinran	4	6	6^{10}
Q	(United States) Leena Friedman	6	6
Q	(United Kingdom) Brooke Black	1	0
(Latvia) Beatrise Zeltiņa	6	6
Ekaterina Tupitsyna	2	1
WC	(France) Dune Vaissaud	7^{7}	3	6
6	(Serbia) Luna Vujović	6^{3}	6	0

Second round
(Austria) L Tagger	7	6
(Romania) GS Popa	5	3
(Czech Republic) J Paštiková	3	7^{7}	5
(Sweden) N Taraba Wallberg	6	6^{2}	7
12	(Germany) J Stusek	6	6
Q	(United States) L Friedman	2	3
(Latvia) B Zeltiņa	6	7
WC	(France) D Vaissaud	0	5

Third round
(Austria) L Tagger	6	6
(Sweden) N Taraba Wallberg	2	3
12	(Germany) J Stusek	6	4	6
(Latvia) B Zeltiņa	2	6	3

Quarterfinals
(Austria) L Tagger	6	6
12	(Germany) J Stusek	0	4

=== Bottom half ===
==== Section 3 ====
First round
8	(United Kingdom) Hannah Klugman	3	6	6
Q	(Spain) Lorena Solar Donoso	6	3	1
SE	(France) Ksenia Efremova	6	6
WC	(Brazil) Pietra Rivoli	4	1
Q	(Romania) Maia Ilinca Burcescu	6	6
(United States) Maya Iyengar	1	2
SE	(Japan) Lisa Kamigata	3	1
10	(Czech Republic) Alena Kovačková	6	6
15	(United States) Thea Frodin	5	6	6
WC	(France) Cindy Langlais	7	4	3
(Bulgaria) Yoana Konstantinova	2	4
Q	(Czech Republic) Sarah Melany Fajmonová	6	6
Q	(Sweden) Linea Bajraliu	4	4
(Germany) Mariella Thamm	6	6
(Slovakia) Mia Pohánková	7^{7}	6
4	(Serbia) Teodora Kostović	6^{3}	3

Second round
8	(United Kingdom) H Klugman	6	6
SE	(France) K Efremova	1	3
Q	(Romania) MI Burcescu	3	2
10	(Czech Republic) A Kovačková	6	6
15	(United States) T Frodin	4	3
Q	(Czech Republic) SM Fajmonová	6	6
(Germany) M Thamm	0	4
(Slovakia) M Pohánková	6	6

Third round
8	(United Kingdom) H Klugman	6	7
10	(Czech Republic) A Kovačková	0	5
Q	(Czech Republic) SM Fajmonová	6	6
(Slovakia) M Pohánková	1	3

Quarterfinals
8	(United Kingdom) H Klugman	3	6	7
Q	(Czech Republic) SM Fajmonová	6	3	5

==== Section 4 ====
First round
5	(Czech Republic) Tereza Krejčová	6^{5}	2
(Germany) Sonja Zhenikhova	7^{7}	6
(Israel) Mika Buchnik	2	4
(Argentina) Luna María Cinalli	6	6
WC	(France) Daphnée Mpetshi Perricard	6	6
(Serbia) Petra Konjikušić	3	4
(United Kingdom) Allegra Korpanec Davies	2	5
11	(China) Zhang Ruien	6	7
16	(Lithuania) Laima Vladson	6	6
Rada Zolotareva	2	0
(Spain) Neus Torner Sensano	6	3	6
(Romania) Diana-Ioana Simionescu	4	6	2
WC	(France) Ophélie Boullay	2	2
Q	(Brazil) Nauhany Vitória Leme da Silva	6	6
(Bulgaria) Rositsa Dencheva	6	6
2	(United States) Kristina Penickova	4	1

Second round
(Germany) S Zhenikhova	6	3	0
(Argentina) LM Cinalli	3	6	6
WC	(France) D Mpetshi Perricard	1	4
11	(China) R Zhang	6	6
16	(Lithuania) L Vladson	6	6
(Spain) N Torner Sensano	4	2
Q	(Brazil) NV Leme da Silva	6^{5}	2
(Bulgaria) R Dencheva	7^{7}	6

Third round
(Argentina) LM Cinalli	5	7^{7}	6
11	(China) R Zhang	7	6^{3}	2
16	(Lithuania) L Vladson	5	4
(Bulgaria) R Dencheva	7	6

Quarterfinals
(Argentina) LM Cinalli	0	5
(Bulgaria) R Dencheva	6	7

== Qualifying ==
=== Seeds ===
1. (Serbia) Anastasija Cvetković (qualifying competition)
2. (China) Shao Yushan (qualifying competition)
3. (Brazil) Nauhany Vitória Leme da Silva (qualified)
4. (Australia) Tahlia Kokkinis (qualifying competition)
5. (Czech Republic) Sarah Melany Fajmonová (qualified)
6. Yuliya Perapekhina (qualifying competition, retired)
7. (Romania) Maia Ilinca Burcescu (qualified)
8. (Spain) Lorena Solar Donoso (qualified)
9. (China) Qu Yihan (qualifying competition)
10. (Australia) Renee Alame (first round)
11. (United Kingdom) Brooke Black (qualified)
12. (United States) Leena Friedman (qualified)
13. (Germany) Victoria Pohle (qualifying competition)
14. (Sweden) Linea Bajraliu (qualified)
15. (United States) Capucine Jauffret (qualified)
16. Polina Kuharenko (qualifying competition)

=== Qualifiers ===
1. (United States) Leena Friedman
2. (United States) Capucine Jauffret
3. (Brazil) Nauhany Vitória Leme da Silva
4. (United Kingdom) Brooke Black
5. (Czech Republic) Sarah Melany Fajmonová
6. (Sweden) Linea Bajraliu
7. (Romania) Maia Ilinca Burcescu
8. (Spain) Lorena Solar Donoso

=== Draw ===
==== First qualifier ====
First round
1	(Serbia) Anastasija Cvetković	6	6^{4}	6
WC	(France) Seda Baslilar	4	7^{7}	1
WC	(France) Milena Ciocan	3	4
12	(United States) Leena Friedman	6	6

Qualifying competition
1	(Serbia) Anastasija Cvetković	6	3	1
12	(United States) Leena Friedman	3	6	6

==== Second qualifier ====
First round
2	(China) Shao Yushan	7^{10}	6
Anastasia Lizunova	6^{8}	3
(Sweden) Lea Nilsson	6	4	6^{5}
15	(United States) Capucine Jauffret	3	6	7^{7}

Qualifying competition
2	(China) Shao Yushan	6	4	5
15	(United States) Capucine Jauffret	2	6	7

==== Third qualifier ====
First round
3	(Brazil) Nauhany Vitória Leme da Silva	4	7	6
WC	(France) Mila Bastianelli	6	5	2
(South Africa) Jahnie van Zyl	6	6
10	(Australia) Renee Alame	3	3

Qualifying competition
3	(Brazil) Nauhany Vitória Leme da Silva	6	6
(South Africa) Jahnie van Zyl	2	2

==== Fourth qualifier ====
First round
4	(Australia) Tahlia Kokkinis	6	6
WC	(France) Emma Fulvia Wiesenfeld	2	2
(India) Maaya Rajeshwaran	2	3
11	(United Kingdom) Brooke Black	6	6

Qualifying competition
4	(Australia) Tahlia Kokkinis	4	2
11	(United Kingdom) Brooke Black	6	6

==== Fifth qualifier ====
First round
5	(Czech Republic) Sarah Melany Fajmonová	6	6
(United Kingdom) Flora Johnson	3	4
WC	(France) Daniel Baranes	2	6	5
9	(China) Qu Yihan	6	2	7

Qualifying competition
5	(Czech Republic) Sarah Melany Fajmonová	7^{10}	6
9	(China) Qu Yihan	6^{8}	2

==== Sixth qualifier ====
First round
6	Yuliya Perapekhina	7^{7}	6
(Romania) Anamaria Federica Oana	6^{3}	4
(Netherlands) Antonia Stoyanov	4	6	5
14	(Sweden) Linea Bajraliu	6	3	7

Qualifying competition
6	Yuliya Perapekhina	3^{r}
14	(Sweden) Linea Bajraliu	5

==== Seventh qualifier ====
First round
7	(Romania) Maia Ilinca Burcescu	6	6
(Argentina) Candela Vázquez	3	1
(Israel) Maayan Laron	1	6	4
13	(Germany) Victoria Pohle	6	4	6

Qualifying competition
7	(Romania) Maia Ilinca Burcescu	6	6
13	(Germany) Victoria Pohle	2	1

==== Eighth qualifier ====
First round
8	(Spain) Lorena Solar Donoso	6	6
WC	(France) Capucine Cedillo-Vayson de Pradenne	1	2
(Jamaica) Alyssa James	0	6	4
16	Polina Kuharenko	6	3	6

Qualifying competition
8	(Spain) Lorena Solar Donoso	6	6
16	Polina Kuharenko	4	4
