= Luna Vujović =

Serbian tennis player (born 2009)

- Country (sports): Serbia
- Residence: Novi Sad, Serbia
- Born: 24 July 2009 (age 17) Herceg Novi, Montenegro
- Plays: Right-handed (two-handed backhand)
- Prize money: $22,357

Singles
- Career record: 58–24
- Career titles: 2 ITF
- Highest ranking: No. 340 (14 September 2026)
- Current ranking: No. 346 (15 November 2026)

Grand Slam singles results
- Australian Open Junior: 2R (2026)
- French Open Junior: 1R (2025)
- Wimbledon Junior: 1R (2025)

Doubles
- Career record: 9–5
- Highest ranking: No. 1,014 (4 May 2026)
- Current ranking: No. 1,145 (3 August 2026)

Grand Slam doubles results
- Australian Open Junior: QF (2025)
- French Open Junior: QF (2025)
- Wimbledon Junior: 2R (2025)

Team competitions
- Fed Cup: 0–1 (singles 0–0)
- Last updated on: 6 August 2026.

Luna Vujović (Serbian Cyrillic: Луна Вујовић; born 24 July 2009) is a Serbian tennis player. She has a career-high singles ranking by the WTA of No. 490, achieved on 3 August 2026.

== Early life and background ==
Vujović was introduced to tennis through her father and grandmother, who were avid fans of the sport. Inspired by Novak Djokovic, she began playing tennis at the age of six. Her tennis idols include Carlos Alcaraz, Elena Rybakina, and Maria Sharapova.

== Juniors ==
Competing on the ITF Junior Circuit, Vujović achieved a career-high ranking of world No. 8 in singles and doubles on 2 June 2025.

Vujović won the 2023 Wimbledon U14 singles title, defeating Hollie Smart of Great Britain in straight sets. Seven days later, she claimed the U14 title at the Tennis European Junior Championships, with a straight-sets victory over compatriot Dušica Popovski.

In May 2025, Vujović won the J500 Trofeo Bonfiglio singles title.

She reached an ITF junior combined ranking of world No. 8 on 2 June 2025.

== Professional ==
=== 2024: Pro debut and first ITF singles finals ===
At the age of 14, Vujović made her singles debut on the ITF World Tennis Tour at the W15 Antalya tournament. She won three matches in straight sets to qualify for the main draw and went on to reach the final, where she was defeated by Bulgarian player Denislava Glushkova. During 2024, Vujović competed in five additional tournaments in the W15 and W75 categories. She replicated her debut success at the W15 Banja Luka tournament, reaching the final before losing to Slovenian player Živa Falkner.

=== 2025: Billie Jean King Cup debut ===
Vujović received her first nomination to represent Serbia in the Billie Jean King Cup in April 2025, under the captaincy of Dušan Vemić, for the Europe/Africa Zone Group I event against Slovenia and Lithuania, and later in the promotional play-off tie against Croatia. She made her debut for the national team on 10 April 2025, partnering with Anja Stanković in a doubles match against a Lithuanian pair, which resulted in a loss.

== ITF Circuit finals ==
=== Singles: 5 (2 titles, 3 runner-ups) ===
Legend W35 tournaments (1–0) W15 tournaments (1–3)	Finals by surface Hard (1–0) Clay (1–3)

Result	W–L	Date	Tournament	Tier	Surface	Opponent	Score
Loss	0–1	Mar 2024	ITF Antalya, Turkey	W15	Clay	(Bulgaria) Denislava Glushkova	4–6, 4–6
Loss	0–2	Jun 2024	ITF Banja Luka, Bosnia and Herzegovina	W15	Clay	(Slovenia) Živa Falkner	4–6, 4–6
Win	1–2	Nov 2025	ITF Monastir, Tunisia	W15	Hard	(Belgium) Tamila Gadamauri	7–6^{(3)}, 7–6^{(6)}
Loss	1–3	May 2026	ITF Kuršumlijska Banja, Serbia	W15	Clay	(Switzerland) Marie Mettraux	6–7^{(5)}, 2–6
Win	2–3	Jun 2026	ITF Casablanca, Morocco	W35	Clay	(Spain) Aran Teixidó García	6–4, 6–4

=== Doubles: 1 (runner-up) ===
Legend W15 tournaments (0–1)	Finals by surface Hard (0–1)

Result	W–L	Date	Tournament	Tier	Surface	Partner	Opponents	Score
Loss	0–1	Nov 2025	ITF Monastir, Tunisia	W15	Hard	(Czech Republic) Emma Slavíková	(France) Lucie Pawlak (Sweden) Isabella Svahn	4–6, 6–4, [8–10]

== Junior Grand Slam finals ==
=== Girls' singles: 1 (title) ===
Result	Year	Tournament	Surface	Opponent	Score
Win	2023	Wimbledon	Grass	(United Kingdom) Hollie Smart	6–3, 6–1
