= 2025 French Open – Wheelchair quad singles =

Wheelchair quad singles
- 2025 French Open

Final
- Champion: (Israel) Guy Sasson
- Runner-up: (Netherlands) Niels Vink
- Score: 6–4, 7–5

Events
Singles	men	women		boys	girls
Doubles	men	women	mixed	boys	girls
WC Singles	men	women	quad	boys	girls
WC Doubles	men	women	quad	boys	girls
- French Open

Defending champion Guy Sasson defeated Niels Vink in the final, 6–4, 7–5 to win the quad singles wheelchair tennis title at the 2025 French Open. It was his second major singles title.

== Seeds ==
1. (Netherlands) Niels Vink (final)
2. (Netherlands) Sam Schröder (semifinals)

== Draw ==
Key

- Q = Qualifier
- WC = Wild card
- LL = Lucky loser
- Alt = Alternate
- ITF = ITF entry
- PR = Protected ranking
- SR = Special ranking
- SE = Special exempt
- JE = Junior exempt
- JR = Junior Accelerator Programme entrant
- CO = College Accelerator Programme entrant
- NG = Next Gen Accelerator Program entrant
- w/o = Walkover
- r = Retired
- d = Defaulted

=== Draw ===
Quarterfinals
1	(Netherlands) Niels Vink	6	6
(Turkey) Ahmet Kaplan	2	4
WC	(Canada) Robert Shaw	5	5
(United Kingdom) Andy Lapthorne	7	7
(Chile) Francisco Cayulef	1	3
(Israel) Guy Sasson	6	6
(South Africa) Donald Ramphadi	0	3
2	(Netherlands) Sam Schröder	6	6

Semifinals
1	(Netherlands) Niels Vink	6	6
(United Kingdom) Andy Lapthorne	4	4
(Israel) Guy Sasson	1	6	6
2	(Netherlands) Sam Schröder	6	4	4

Final
1	(Netherlands) Niels Vink	4	5
(Israel) Guy Sasson	6	7
