= 2025 French Open – Wheelchair quad doubles =

Wheelchair quad doubles
- 2025 French Open

Final
- Champions: (Israel) Guy Sasson (Netherlands) Niels Vink
- Runners-up: (Turkey) Ahmet Kaplan (South Africa) Donald Ramphadi
- Score: 6–3, 6–4

Events
Singles	men	women		boys	girls
Doubles	men	women	mixed	boys	girls
WC Singles	men	women	quad	boys	girls
WC Doubles	men	women	quad	boys	girls
- French Open

Defending champion Niels Vink and his partner Guy Sasson defeated Ahmet Kaplan and Donald Ramphadi in the final, 6–3, 6–4 to win the quad doubles wheelchair tennis title at the 2025 French Open.

Sam Schröder and Niels Vink were the defending champions, but chose not to defend the title together. Schröder partnered Andy Lapthorne, but lost in the semifinals to Kaplan and Ramphadi.

== Seeds ==
1. (Israel) Guy Sasson / (Netherlands) Niels Vink (champions)
2. (United Kingdom) Andy Lapthorne / (Netherlands) Sam Schröder (semifinals)

== Draw ==
Key

- Q = Qualifier
- WC = Wild card
- LL = Lucky loser
- Alt = Alternate
- ITF = ITF entry
- PR = Protected ranking
- SR = Special ranking
- SE = Special exempt
- JE = Junior exempt
- JR = Junior Accelerator Programme entrant
- CO = College Accelerator Programme entrant
- NG = Next Gen Accelerator Program entrant
- w/o = Walkover
- r = Retired
- d = Defaulted

=== Draw ===
Semifinals
1	(Israel) Guy Sasson (Netherlands) Niels Vink	6	6
(Chile) Francisco Cayulef (Canada) Robert Shaw	0	2
(Turkey) Ahmet Kaplan (South Africa) Donald Ramphadi	6	2	[10]
2	(United Kingdom) Andy Lapthorne (Netherlands) Sam Schröder	3	6	[7]

Final
1	(Israel) Guy Sasson (Netherlands) Niels Vink	6	6
(Turkey) Ahmet Kaplan (South Africa) Donald Ramphadi	3	4
