= 2025 French Open – Girls' doubles =

Junior Tennis Tournament

Girls' doubles
- 2025 French Open

Final
- Champions: (Germany) Eva Bennemann (Germany) Sonja Zhenikhova
- Runners-up: (Czech Republic) Alena Kovačková (Czech Republic) Jana Kovačková
- Score: 4–6, 6–4, [10–8]

Events
Singles	men	women		boys	girls
Doubles	men	women	mixed	boys	girls
WC Singles	men	women	quad	boys	girls
WC Doubles	men	women	quad	boys	girls
- French Open

Eva Bennemann and Sonja Zhenikhova won the girls' doubles title at the 2024 French Open, defeating Alena and Jana Kovačková in the final, 4–6, 6–4, [10–8].

Renáta Jamrichová and Tereza Valentová were the reigning champions, but chose not to defend their title.

== Seeds ==
1. (Australia) Emerson Jones / (United Kingdom) Hannah Klugman (first round)
2. (United States) Annika Penickova / (United States) Kristina Penickova (semifinals)
3. (Czech Republic) Alena Kovačková / (Czech Republic) Jana Kovačková (final)
4. (Brazil) Victoria Luiza Barros / (Serbia) Teodora Kostović (second round)
5. (Argentina) Luna María Cinalli / (United States) Julieta Pareja (quarterfinals)
6. (Czech Republic) Tereza Krejčová / (Czech Republic) Vendula Valdmannová (quarterfinals)
7. (Spain) Charo Esquiva Bañuls / (Sweden) Nellie Taraba Wallberg (quarterfinals)
8. (United States) Maya Iyengar / (China) Zhang Ruien (first round)

== Draw ==
Key

- Q = Qualifier
- WC = Wild card
- LL = Lucky loser
- Alt = Alternate
- ITF = ITF entry
- PR = Protected ranking
- SR = Special ranking
- SE = Special exempt
- JE = Junior exempt
- JR = Junior Accelerator Programme entrant
- CO = College Accelerator Programme entrant
- NG = Next Gen Accelerator Program entrant
- w/o = Walkover
- r = Retired
- d = Defaulted

=== Finals ===
Semifinals
(Germany) Eva Bennemann (Germany) Sonja Zhenikhova	7	7^{7}
(Slovakia) Mia Pohánková (Austria) Lilli Tagger	5	6^{5}
3	(Czech Republic) Alena Kovačková (Czech Republic) Jana Kovačková	4	7	[10]
2	(United States) Annika Penickova (United States) Kristina Penickova	6	5	[3]

Final
(Germany) Eva Bennemann (Germany) Sonja Zhenikhova	4	6	[10]
3	(Czech Republic) Alena Kovačková (Czech Republic) Jana Kovačková	6	4	[8]

=== Top half ===
First round
1	(Australia) Emerson Jones (United Kingdom) Hannah Klugman	3	6	[8]
(Germany) Eva Bennemann (Germany) Sonja Zhenikhova	6	3	[10]
(Argentina) Sol Ailin Larraya Guidi (Brazil) Nauhany Vitória Leme da Silva	5	3
(Bulgaria) Rositsa Dencheva (Bulgaria) Elizara Yaneva	7	6
WC	(France) Daniel Baranes (France) Mila Bastianelli	2	6	[4]
(United Kingdom) Allegra Korpanec Davies (Spain) Lorena Solar Donoso	6	2	[10]
(United States) Thea Frodin (Bulgaria) Yoana Konstantinova	6	3	[10]
6	(Czech Republic) Tereza Krejčová (Czech Republic) Vendula Valdmannová	3	6	[12]
4	(Brazil) Victoria Luiza Barros (Serbia) Teodora Kostović	6	6
(France) Ksenia Efremova (Belgium) Jeline Vandromme	3	4
(Israel) Mika Buchnik (United States) Leena Friedman	3	4
(Slovakia) Mia Pohánková (Austria) Lilli Tagger	6	6
(United States) Capucine Jauffret (Lithuania) Laima Vladson	6	7
(China) Qu Yihan (China) Sun Xinran	3	5
WC	(France) Seda Baslilar (France) Nehira Sanon	6	1	[5]
5	(Argentina) Luna María Cinalli (United States) Julieta Pareja	3	6	[10]

Second round
(Germany) E Bennemann (Germany) S Zhenikhova	6	6
(Bulgaria) R Dencheva (Bulgaria) E Yaneva	4	2
(United Kingdom) A Korpanec Davies (Spain) L Solar Donoso	2	2
6	(Czech Republic) T Krejčová (Czech Republic) V Valdmannová	6	6
4	(Brazil) VL Barros (Serbia) T Kostović	3	6	[9]
(Slovakia) M Pohánková (Austria) L Tagger	6	4	[11]
(United States) C Jauffret (Lithuania) L Vladson	6	5	[7]
5	(Argentina) LM Cinalli (United States) J Pareja	0	7	[10]

Quarterfinals
(Germany) E Bennemann (Germany) S Zhenikhova	6	6
6	(Czech Republic) T Krejčová (Czech Republic) V Valdmannová	3	4
(Slovakia) M Pohánková (Austria) L Tagger	6	6
5	(Argentina) LM Cinalli (United States) J Pareja	0	4

Semifinals
(Germany) E Bennemann (Germany) S Zhenikhova	7	7^{7}
(Slovakia) M Pohánková (Austria) L Tagger	5	6^{5}

=== Bottom half ===
First round
8	(United States) Maya Iyengar (China) Zhang Ruien	2	3
(Romania) Maia Ilinca Burcescu (Serbia) Luna Vujović	6	6
(Japan) Reina Goto (Serbia) Petra Konjikušić	3	0
(Germany) Mariella Thamm (Spain) Neus Torner Sensano	6	6
WC	(France) Eleejah Inisan (France) Daphnée Mpetshi Perricard	1	2
(Romania) Diana-Ioana Simionescu; Rada Zolotareva	6	6
(Romania) Giulia Safina Popa (Slovakia) Kali Šupová	5	4
3	(Czech Republic) Alena Kovačková (Czech Republic) Jana Kovačková	7	6
7	(Spain) C Esquiva Bañuls (Sweden) Nellie Taraba Wallberg	6	6
(Turkey) Deniz Dilek (Latvia) Beatrise Zeltiņa	4	4
(Canada) Nadia Lagaev (Brazil) Pietra Rivoli	3	1
WC	(France) Ophélie Boullay (France) Cindy Langlais	6	6
(Czech Republic) Julie Paštiková (Germany) Julia Stusek	3	7	[2]
(Sweden) Linea Bajraliu (Serbia) Anastasija Cvetković	6	5	[10]
(United Kingdom) Brooke Black (Czech Republic) Sarah Melany Fajmonová	2	2
2	(United States) Annika Penickova (United States) Kristina Penickova	6	6

Second round
(Romania) MI Burcescu (Serbia) L Vujović	6	6
(Germany) M Thamm (Spain) N Torner Sensano	4	2
(Romania) D-I Simionescu; R Zolotareva	7	6^{3}	[8]
3	(Czech Republic) A Kovačková (Czech Republic) J Kovačková	5	7^{7}	[10]
7	(Spain) C Esquiva Bañuls (Sweden) N Taraba Wallberg	6	6
WC	(France) O Boullay (France) C Langlais	1	4
(Sweden) L Bajraliu (Serbia) A Cvetković	5	4
2	(United States) A Penickova (United States) K Penickova	7	6

Quarterfinals
(Romania) MI Burcescu (Serbia) L Vujović	7^{7}	1	[3]
3	(Czech Republic) A Kovačková (Czech Republic) J Kovačková	6^{1}	6	[10]
7	(Spain) C Esquiva Bañuls (Sweden) N Taraba Wallberg	7^{7}	6^{3}	[5]
2	(United States) A Penickova (United States) K Penickova	6^{4}	7^{7}	[10]

Semifinals
3	(Czech Republic) A Kovačková (Czech Republic) J Kovačková	4	7	[10]
2	(United States) A Penickova (United States) K Penickova	6	5	[3]
