= William Rejchtman Vinciguerra =

Swedish tennis player (born 2007)

- Country (sports): Sweden
- Born: 10 February 2007 (age 19) Malmö, Sweden
- Height: 1.78 m (5 ft 10 in)
- Plays: Left-handed (two-handed backhand)
- Prize money: US $35,714

Singles
- Career record: 0–1 (at ATP Tour level, Grand Slam level, and in Davis Cup)
- Career titles: 0
- Highest ranking: No. 755 (16 November 2026)
- Current ranking: No. 755 (16 November 2026)

Grand Slam singles results
- Australian Open Junior: QF (2025)
- French Open Junior: 1R (2024, 2025)
- Wimbledon Junior: 2R (2024)
- US Open Junior: 1R (2024, 2025)

Doubles
- Career record: 0–2 (at ATP Tour level, Grand Slam level, and in Davis Cup)
- Career titles: 0
- Highest ranking: No. 805 (28 September 2026)
- Current ranking: No. 813 (9 November 2026)

Grand Slam doubles results
- Australian Open Junior: SF (2025)
- French Open Junior: QF (2025)
- Wimbledon Junior: 1R (2024)
- US Open Junior: 2R (2025)
- Last updated on: 16 November 2026.

William Rejchtman Vinciguerra (born 10 February 2007) is a Swedish tennis player. He has a career-high ATP singles ranking of No. 755 achieved on 16 November 2026 and a doubles ranking of No. 805 achieved on 28 September 2026.

== Early life ==
He started playing tennis at a young age and was coached by his father Robert, as well as Thomas Högstedt, who previously trained Maria Sharapova and Caroline Wozniacki. In January 2023, he received a scholarship from The Streber Foundation.

== Junior career ==
As a junior, he reached the final of the Tennis Europe Masters Finals in Monaco, where he was defeated by Norwegian Nicolai Budkov Kjær.

He made his junior Grand Slam debut at the 2024 Australian Open. He competed in the junior events at the 2024 Wimbledon Championships where he also practised with Swedish ice hockey player William Nylander.

== Professional career ==
With Leo Borg, he was awarded a wildcard into the men's doubles at the 2024 Swedish Open for his ATP main draw debut.

== Personal life ==
His uncle is former professional tennis player Andreas Vinciguerra.

== ITF World Tennis Tour finals ==
=== Singles: 1 (title) ===
| Legend ITF WTT (1–0) |

| Result | W–L | Date | Tournament | Tier | Surface | Opponent | Score |
|---|---|---|---|---|---|---|---|
| Win | 1–0 | Nov 2025 | M15 Heraklion, Greece | WTT | Hard | (Greece) Petros Tsitsipas | 6–4, 3–6, 6–4 |
