= 2025 French Open – Wheelchair girls' singles =

Wheelchair girls' singles
- 2025 French Open

Final
- Champion: (Brazil) Vitória Miranda
- Runner-up: (United States) Sabina Czauz
- Score: 6–3, 6–2

Events
Singles	men	women		boys	girls
Doubles	men	women	mixed	boys	girls
WC Singles	men	women	quad	boys	girls
WC Doubles	men	women	quad	boys	girls
- French Open

Brazilian Vitória Miranda won the Roland Garros Grand Slam tennis title in the junior wheelchair category.

In the final, she defeated American Sabina Czauz 6–3, 6–2 to add the trophy to the Australian Open title she won earlier in the year.

== Seeds ==
1. (Brazil) Vitória Miranda (champion)
2. (Belgium) Luna Gryp (semifinals)

== Draw ==
Key

- Q = Qualifier
- WC = Wild card
- LL = Lucky loser
- Alt = Alternate
- ITF = ITF entry
- PR = Protected ranking
- SR = Special ranking
- SE = Special exempt
- JE = Junior exempt
- JR = Junior Accelerator Programme entrant
- CO = College Accelerator Programme entrant
- NG = Next Gen Accelerator Program entrant
- w/o = Walkover
- r = Retired
- d = Defaulted

=== Draw ===
Semifinals
1	(Brazil) Vitória Miranda	6	6
(Sweden) Emma Gjerseth	2	1
(United States) Sabina Czauz	7^{7}	6
2	(Belgium) Luna Gryp	6^{3}	2

Final
1	(Brazil) Vitória Miranda	6	6
(United States) Sabina Czauz	3	2
