= Noah Johnston =

American tennis player (born 2007)

- Country (sports): United States
- Born: 21 November 2007 (age 18) Anderson, South Carolina, US
- Height: 6 ft 0 in (1.83 m)
- Plays: Right-handed (two-handed backhand)
- Prize money: US $5,529

Singles
- Career record: 0–0 (at ATP Tour level, Grand Slam level, and in Davis Cup)
- Career titles: 0
- Highest ranking: No. 1,230 (July 20, 2026)
- Current ranking: No. 1,258 (August 31, 2026)

Grand Slam singles results
- Australian Open Junior: 1R (2025)
- French Open Junior: 2R (2025)
- Wimbledon Junior: 2R (2025)
- US Open Junior: 2R (2024)

Doubles
- Career record: 0–0 (at ATP Tour level, Grand Slam level, and in Davis Cup)
- Career titles: 0
- Highest ranking: No. 1,006 (August 24, 2026)
- Current ranking: No. 1,026 (August 31, 2026)

Grand Slam doubles results
- US Open: 1R (2026)
- Australian Open Junior: QF (2025)
- French Open Junior: F (2025)
- Wimbledon Junior: 2R (2025)
- US Open Junior: F (2025)
- Last updated on: September, 3 2026.

Noah Johnston (born 21 November 2007) is an American tennis player. He has a career-high singles ranking of No. 1,230 achieved on July 20, 2026 and a doubles ranking of No. 1,006 achieved on August 24, 2026.

Johnston has received a wildcard into the 2026 US Open doubles, partnering with Yannik Álvarez.

== Early and personal life ==
Johnston is from Anderson, South Carolina, where he is coached by his mother, Sophie and grandfather Lucien Woorons. His grandfather previously coached his mother, who moved from France to play tennis on a scholarship at Clemson University before owning a tennis club in the state. He is fluent in English and French, and enrolled in online school to help him pursue tennis. In November 2024, he signed for the University of Georgia.

== Career ==
In 2022, Johnston won the South Carolina High School Class AAA individual state championship and won the U14 singles competition at the Easter Bowl. By 2024 at the age of 16, he had broken into the top-100 junior players in the world.

He won the J300 series tournament in Porto Alegre in Brazil in February 2025, defeating Bulgarian Ivan Ivanov in the final.

At the 2025 French Open he played in the boys' doubles alongside compatriot Benjamin Willwerth, where they reached the final before losing to Oskari Paldanius of Finland and Poland's Alan Ważny. The pair went on to reach the final of the boys' doubles at the 2025 US Open but were defeated by compatriots Keaton Hance and Jack Kennedy.

== Junior Grand Slam finals ==
=== Doubles: 2 (2 runner up) ===
Result	Year	Tournament	Surface	Partner	Opponents	Score
Loss	2025	French Open	Clay	(United States) Benjamin Willwerth	(Finland) Oskari Paldanius (Poland) Alan Ważny	2–6, 3–6
Loss	2025	US Open	Hard	(United States) Benjamin Willwerth	(United States) Keaton Hance (United States) Jack Kennedy	3–6, 6–1, [8–10]
