= 2025 French Open – Wheelchair boys' singles =

Wheelchair boys' singles
- 2025 French Open

Final
- Champions: (Austria) Maximilian Taucher
- Runners-up: (United States) Charlie Cooper
- Score: 6–2, 7–6^{(7–3)}

Events
Singles	men	women		boys	girls
Doubles	men	women	mixed	boys	girls
WC Singles	men	women	quad	boys	girls
WC Doubles	men	women	quad	boys	girls
- French Open

Austrian Maximilian Taucher defeated American Charlie Cooper and Belgium's Alexander Lantermann 6–2, 7–6^{(7–3)} to win his second Wheelchair Boys' Singles trophy.

== Seeds ==
1. (Austria) Maximilian Taucher (champion)
2. (Belgium) Alexander Lantermann (semifinals)

== Draw ==
Key

- Q = Qualifier
- WC = Wild card
- LL = Lucky loser
- Alt = Alternate
- ITF = ITF entry
- PR = Protected ranking
- SR = Special ranking
- SE = Special exempt
- JE = Junior exempt
- JR = Junior Accelerator Programme entrant
- CO = College Accelerator Programme entrant
- NG = Next Gen Accelerator Program entrant
- w/o = Walkover
- r = Retired
- d = Defaulted

=== Draw ===
Semifinals
1	(Austria) Maximilian Taucher	6	6
(Brazil) Luiz Calixto	3	0
(United States) Charlie Cooper	7^{7}	4	6
2	(Belgium) Alexander Lantermann	6^{2}	6	1

Final
1	(Austria) Maximilian Taucher	6	7^{7}
(United States) Charlie Cooper	2	6^{3}
