= 2025 French Open – Wheelchair girls' doubles =

Wheelchair girls' doubles
- 2025 French Open

Final
- Champions: (Brazil) Vitória Miranda (Belgium) Luna Gryp
- Runners-up: (United States) Sabina Czauz (Sweden) Emma Gjerseth
- Score: 6–3, 6–2

Events
Singles	men	women		boys	girls
Doubles	men	women	mixed	boys	girls
WC Singles	men	women	quad	boys	girls
WC Doubles	men	women	quad	boys	girls
- French Open

Brazil's Vitória Miranda and Belgium's Luna Gryp defeated American Sabina Czauz and Sweden's Emma Gjerseth 6–3, 6–2 to win the Wheelchair Girls' Doubles trophy.

== Draw ==
Key

- Q = Qualifier
- WC = Wild card
- LL = Lucky loser
- Alt = Alternate
- ITF = ITF entry
- PR = Protected ranking
- SR = Special ranking
- SE = Special exempt
- JE = Junior exempt
- JR = Junior Accelerator Programme entrant
- CO = College Accelerator Programme entrant
- NG = Next Gen Accelerator Program entrant
- w/o = Walkover
- r = Retired
- d = Defaulted

=== Final ===
Final
(Brazil) Vitória Miranda (Belgium) Luna Gryp	6	6
(United States) Sabina Czauz (Sweden) Emma Gjerseth	3	2
