= 2025 French Open – Mixed doubles =

Mixed doubles
- 2025 French Open

Final
- Champion: (Italy) Sara Errani (Italy) Andrea Vavassori
- Runner-up: (United States) Taylor Townsend (United States) Evan King
- Score: 6–4, 6–2

Details
- Draw: 32
- Seeds: 8

Events
Singles	men	women		boys	girls
Doubles	men	women	mixed	boys	girls
WC Singles	men	women	quad	boys	girls
WC Doubles	men	women	quad	boys	girls
- French Open

Sara Errani and Andrea Vavassori defeated Taylor Townsend and Evan King in the final, 6–4, 6–2 to win the mixed doubles tennis title at the 2025 French Open. It was the second major mixed doubles title for Errani and Vavassori, and Vavassori became the first Italian man to win the title since Nicola Pietrangeli in 1958.

Laura Siegemund and Édouard Roger-Vasselin were the defending champions, but lost in the quarterfinals to Townsend and King.

Mate Pavić was vying to complete the career Grand Slam in mixed doubles. He partnered Lyudmyla Kichenok, but they lost in the quarterfinals to Desirae Krawczyk and Neal Skupski.

== Seeds ==
1. (Ukraine) Lyudmyla Kichenok / (Croatia) Mate Pavić (quarterfinals)
2. (China) Zhang Shuai / (El Salvador) Marcelo Arévalo (semifinals)
3. (Italy) Sara Errani / (Italy) Andrea Vavassori (champions)
4. (United States) Taylor Townsend / (United States) Evan King (final)
5. (New Zealand) Erin Routliffe / (New Zealand) Michael Venus (second round)
6. (Kazakhstan) Anna Danilina / (Finland) Harri Heliövaara (second round)
7. (United States) Asia Muhammad / (Argentina) Andrés Molteni (first round)
8. (Czech Republic) Kateřina Siniaková / (United States) Rajeev Ram (first round)

== Draw ==
Key

- Q = Qualifier
- WC = Wild card
- LL = Lucky loser
- Alt = Alternate
- ITF = ITF entry
- PR = Protected ranking
- SR = Special ranking
- SE = Special exempt
- JE = Junior exempt
- JR = Junior Accelerator Programme entrant
- CO = College Accelerator Programme entrant
- NG = Next Gen Accelerator Program entrant
- w/o = Walkover
- r = Retired
- d = Defaulted

=== Finals ===
Semifinals
(United States) Desirae Krawczyk (United Kingdom) Neal Skupski	6	6^{2}	[10]
4	(United States) Taylor Townsend (United States) Evan King	3	7^{7}	[12]
3	(Italy) Sara Errani (Italy) Andrea Vavassori	6	6
2	(China) Zhang Shuai (El Salvador) Marcelo Arévalo	2	3

Final
4	(United States) Taylor Townsend (United States) Evan King	4	2
3	(Italy) Sara Errani (Italy) Andrea Vavassori	6	6

=== Top half ===
First round
1	(Ukraine) L Kichenok (Croatia) M Pavić	6	6
(Japan) M Kato (Germany) T Pütz	3	3
WC	(France) D Parry (France) H Mayot	7^{8}	6
WC	(France) C Paquet (France) N Mahut	6^{6}	2
(United States) D Krawczyk (United Kingdom) N Skupski	2	6	[10]
(Hungary) T Babos (Germany) K Krawietz	6	3	[4]
(Slovakia) T Mihalíková (United Kingdom) J Salisbury	5	3
5	(New Zealand) E Routliffe (New Zealand) M Venus	7	6
4	(United States) T Townsend (United States) E King	6	6
WC	(France) J Ponchet (France) G Jacq	0	2
(Netherlands) D Schuurs (Croatia) N Mektić	6^{5}	3
WC	(France) E Cascino (France) G Blancaneaux	7^{7}	6
(United States) N Melichar-Martinez (United States) C Harrison	7^{7}	6
WC	(France) L Jeanjean (France) M Guinard	6^{5}	4
(Germany) L Siegemund (France) É Roger-Vasselin	6	7^{7}
7	(United States) A Muhammad (Argentina) A Molteni	3	6^{4}

Second round
1	(Ukraine) L Kichenok (Croatia) M Pavić	6	2	[10]
WC	(France) D Parry (France) H Mayot	3	6	[8]
(United States) D Krawczyk (United Kingdom) N Skupski	6	2	[11]
5	(New Zealand) E Routliffe (New Zealand) M Venus	3	6	[9]
4	(United States) T Townsend (United States) E King	6	7
WC	(France) E Cascino (France) G Blancaneaux	3	5
(United States) N Melichar-Martinez (United States) C Harrison	6	4	[8]
(Germany) L Siegemund (France) É Roger-Vasselin	3	6	[10]

Quarterfinals
1	(Ukraine) L Kichenok (Croatia) M Pavić	3	4
(United States) D Krawczyk (United Kingdom) N Skupski	6	6
4	(United States) T Townsend (United States) E King	6	6
(Germany) L Siegemund (France) É Roger-Vasselin	3	4

Semifinals
(United States) D Krawczyk (United Kingdom) N Skupski	6	6^{2}	[10]
4	(United States) T Townsend (United States) E King	3	7^{7}	[12]

=== Bottom half ===
First round
6	(Kazakhstan) A Danilina (Finland) H Heliövaara	6	6
PR	(Australia) S Hunter (Belgium) S Gillé	3	4
(United Kingdom) O Nicholls (United Kingdom) H Patten	6	6
A Panova (United States) J Withrow	4	2
(Chinese Taipei) F-h Wu (Netherlands) S Verbeek	6^{5}	2
Alt	(China) X Jiang (United States) R Galloway	7^{7}	6
(Chinese Taipei) H-c Chan (Monaco) H Nys	4	3
3	(Italy) S Errani (Italy) A Vavassori	6	6
8	(Czech Republic) K Siniaková (United States) R Ram	4	6	[11]
Alt	(Spain) C Bucșa (Brazil) R Matos	6	2	[13]
(Australia) E Perez (United Kingdom) J Cash	6^{2}	4
(Mexico) G Olmos (United Kingdom) L Glasspool	7^{7}	6
Alt	(Brazil) L Stefani (Argentina) M González	6	6
I Khromacheva (Sweden) A Göransson	3	4
WC	(France) J Belgraver (France) L Sanchez	2	4
2	(China) S Zhang (El Salvador) M Arévalo	6	6

Second round
6	(Kazakhstan) A Danilina (Finland) H Heliövaara	4	6^{0}
(United Kingdom) O Nicholls (United Kingdom) H Patten	6	7^{7}
Alt	(China) X Jiang (United States) R Galloway	3	5
3	(Italy) S Errani (Italy) A Vavassori	6	7
Alt	(Spain) C Bucșa (Brazil) R Matos	4	7^{9}	[9]
(Mexico) G Olmos (United Kingdom) L Glasspool	6	6^{7}	[11]
Alt	(Brazil) L Stefani (Argentina) M González	3	5
2	(China) S Zhang (El Salvador) M Arévalo	6	7

Quarterfinals
(United Kingdom) O Nicholls (United Kingdom) H Patten
3	(Italy) S Errani (Italy) A Vavassori	w/o
(Mexico) G Olmos (United Kingdom) L Glasspool	3	2
2	(China) S Zhang (El Salvador) M Arévalo	6	6

Semifinals
3	(Italy) S Errani (Italy) A Vavassori	6	6
2	(China) S Zhang (El Salvador) M Arévalo	2	3

== Other entry information ==
=== Wild cards ===
- ~~(France) Tessah Andrianjafitrimo / (France) Ugo Humbert~~
- (France) Julie Belgraver / (France) Luca Sanchez
- (France) Estelle Cascino / (France) Geoffrey Blancaneaux
- (France) Léolia Jeanjean / (France) Manuel Guinard
- ~~(France) Carole Monnet / (France) Albano Olivetti~~
- (France) Chloé Paquet / (France) Nicolas Mahut
- (France) Diane Parry / (France) Harold Mayot
- (France) Jessika Ponchet / (France) Grégoire Jacq

=== Alternates ===
- (Spain) Cristina Bucșa / (Brazil) Rafael Matos
- (China) Jiang Xinyu / (United States) Robert Galloway
- (Brazil) Luisa Stefani / (Argentina) Máximo González

=== Withdrawals ===
- (France) Tessah Andrianjafitrimo / (France) Ugo Humbert → replaced by (China) Jiang Xinyu / (United States) Robert Galloway
- (Chinese Taipei) Hsieh Su-wei / (Poland) Jan Zieliński → replaced by (Brazil) Luisa Stefani / (Argentina) Máximo González
- (France) Carole Monnet / (France) Albano Olivetti → replaced by (Spain) Cristina Bucșa / (Brazil) Rafael Matos
