= Charo Esquiva Bañuls =

Spanish tennis player

- Country (sports): Spain
- Born: 12 March 2008 (age 18)

Singles
- Highest ranking: No. 755 (24 August 2026)
- Current ranking: No. 769 (21 September 2026)

Grand Slam singles results
- French Open Junior: QF (2026)
- Wimbledon Junior: 3R (2025, 2026)
- US Open Junior: QF (2025)

Doubles
- Highest ranking: No. 1012 (4 May 2026)
- Current ranking: No. 1039 (21 September 2026)

Grand Slam doubles results
- French Open Junior: QF (2025)
- Wimbledon Junior: QF (2025)
- US Open Junior: 1R (2024)
- Last updated on: 1 June 2025.

Charo Esquiva Bañuls is a Spanish tennis player.

== Career ==
She is from Bigastro, in the Province of Alicante. She made her junior Grand Slam debut at the 2023 French Open. In March 2025, she won the ITF J300 Villena, the most prestigious junior tournament in Spain. Alongside Nellie Taraba Wallberg she reached the quarter-finals of the Girls' doubles at the 2025 Wimbledon Championships. In September, she was defeated by Wallberg in the girls’ singles final of the U18 European Championships.

In June 2026, she was a quarter-finalist in the girls' singles at the 2026 French Open where she was defeated by Czech player Jana Kovackova. At the 2026 US Open she was defeated by American Chukwumelije Clarke. In September 2026, she won the Open Internacional Ciudad de Yecla, a W50 tournament on the ITF Tour.
