= 2025 French Open – Wheelchair men's singles =

Wheelchair men's singles
- 2025 French Open

Final
- Champion: (Japan) Tokito Oda
- Runner-up: (United Kingdom) Alfie Hewett
- Score: 6–4, 7–6^{(8–6)}

Events
Singles	men	women		boys	girls
Doubles	men	women	mixed	boys	girls
WC Singles	men	women	quad	boys	girls
WC Doubles	men	women	quad	boys	girls
- French Open

Two-time defending champion Tokito Oda defeated Alfie Hewett in the final, 6–4, 7–6^{(8–6)} to win the men's singles wheelchair tennis title at the 2025 French Open. It was his third French Open singles title and fifth major singles title.

== Seeds ==
1. (Japan) Tokito Oda (champion)
2. (United Kingdom) Alfie Hewett (final)
3. (Spain) Martín de la Puente (semifinals)
4. (Argentina) Gustavo Fernández (semifinals)

== Draw ==
Key

- Q = Qualifier
- WC = Wild card
- LL = Lucky loser
- Alt = Alternate
- ITF = ITF entry
- PR = Protected ranking
- SR = Special ranking
- SE = Special exempt
- JE = Junior exempt
- JR = Junior Accelerator Programme entrant
- CO = College Accelerator Programme entrant
- NG = Next Gen Accelerator Program entrant
- w/o = Walkover
- r = Retired
- d = Defaulted

=== Draw ===
First round
1	(Japan) Tokito Oda	6	7
(France) Stéphane Houdet	3	5
(Spain) Daniel Caverzaschi	7	6
(Israel) Sergei Lysov	5	4
3	(Spain) Martín de la Puente	6	5	6
(Japan) Takuya Miki	3	7	1
(Belgium) Joachim Gérard	4	6^{5}
(Netherlands) Ruben Spaargaren	6	7^{7}
(United States) Casey Ratzlaff	5	7	6
(Netherlands) Tom Egberink	7	5	4
WC	(France) Gaëtan Menguy	2	0
4	(Argentina) Gustavo Fernández	6	6
(United Kingdom) Gordon Reid	6	7
WC	(France) Nicolas Charrier	0	5
(Chile) Alexander Cataldo	1	0
2	(United Kingdom) Alfie Hewett	6	6

Quarterfinals
1	(Japan) T Oda	6	5	6
(Spain) D Caverzaschi	2	7	0
3	(Spain) M de la Puente	6	6
(Netherlands) R Spaargaren	3	3
(United States) C Ratzlaff	1	5
4	(Argentina) G Fernández	6	7
(United Kingdom) G Reid	2	4
2	(United Kingdom) A Hewett	6	6

Semifinals
1	(Japan) T Oda	6	6
3	(Spain) M de la Puente	4	4
4	(Argentina) G Fernández	4	6	6^{10}
2	(United Kingdom) A Hewett	6	4	7^{12}

Final
1	(Japan) T Oda	6	7^{8}
2	(United Kingdom) A Hewett	4	6^{6}
