= 2025 French Open – Wheelchair women's singles =

Wheelchair women's singles
- 2025 French Open

Final
- Champion: (Japan) Yui Kamiji
- Runner-up: (Netherlands) Aniek van Koot
- Score: 6–2, 6–2

Events
Singles	men	women		boys	girls
Doubles	men	women	mixed	boys	girls
WC Singles	men	women	quad	boys	girls
WC Doubles	men	women	quad	boys	girls
- French Open

Yui Kamiji defeated Aniek van Koot in the final, 6–2, 6–2 to win the women's singles wheelchair tennis title at the 2025 French Open. It was her fifth French Open singles title and tenth major singles title overall.

Diede de Groot was the four-time defending champion, but lost in the first round to Li Xiaohui.

== Seeds ==
1. (Japan) Yui Kamiji (champion)
2. (Netherlands) Aniek van Koot (final)
3. (Netherlands) Diede de Groot (first round)
4. (China) Wang Ziying (quarterfinals)

== Draw ==
Key

- Q = Qualifier
- WC = Wild card
- LL = Lucky loser
- Alt = Alternate
- ITF = ITF entry
- PR = Protected ranking
- SR = Special ranking
- SE = Special exempt
- JE = Junior exempt
- JR = Junior Accelerator Programme entrant
- CO = College Accelerator Programme entrant
- NG = Next Gen Accelerator Program entrant
- w/o = Walkover
- r = Retired
- d = Defaulted

=== Draw ===
First round
1	(Japan) Yui Kamiji	6	6
WC	(France) Pauline Déroulède	2	0
(Japan) Saki Takamuro	2	1
(Netherlands) Lizzy de Greef	6	6
3	(Netherlands) Diede de Groot	2	4
(China) Li Xiaohui	6	6
(France) Ksénia Chasteau	7	6
WC	(France) Charlotte Fairbank	5	2
(South Africa) Kgothatso Montjane	6	6
(Chile) Macarena Cabrillana	3	3
(Colombia) Angélica Bernal	2	1
4	(China) Wang Ziying	6	6
(Japan) Manami Tanaka	3
(Netherlands) Jiske Griffioen	2^{r}
(China) Zhu Zhenzhen	4	2
2	(Netherlands) Aniek van Koot	6	6

Quarterfinals
1	(Japan) Y Kamiji	6	6
(Netherlands) L de Greef	3	2
(China) X Li	6	6
(France) K Chasteau	2	1
(South Africa) K Montjane	6	6
4	(China) Z Wang	2	4
(Japan) M Tanaka	3	5
2	(Netherlands) A van Koot	6	7

Semifinals
1	(Japan) Y Kamiji	6	6^{4}	6
(China) X Li	2	7^{7}	4
(South Africa) K Montjane	4	4
2	(Netherlands) A van Koot	6	6

Final
1	(Japan) Y Kamiji	6	6
2	(Netherlands) A van Koot	2	2
