= 2025 French Open – Boys' singles =

Boys' singles
- 2025 French Open

Final
- Champion: (Germany) Niels McDonald
- Runner-up: (Germany) Max Schönhaus
- Score: 6–7^{(5–7)}, 6–0, 6–3

Events
Singles	men	women		boys	girls
Doubles	men	women	mixed	boys	girls
WC Singles	men	women	quad	boys	girls
WC Doubles	men	women	quad	boys	girls
- French Open

Niels McDonald won the boys' singles title at the 2025 French Open, defeating Max Schönhaus in the final, 6–7^{(5–7)}, 6–0, 6–3. He was the first German to win the boys' singles title at a Grand Slam since Alexander Zverev at the 2014 Australian Open.

Kaylan Bigun was the defending champion, but was no longer eligible to compete in junior events.

== Seeds ==
1. (Spain) Andrés Santamarta Roig (third round)
2. (Italy) Jacopo Vasamì (quarterfinals)
3. (Finland) Oskari Paldanius (first round)
4. (United States) Jack Kennedy (third round)
5. (United States) Jagger Leach (third round)
6. (United States) Benjamin Willwerth (quarterfinals)
7. (Romania) Yannick Theodor Alexandrescou (quarterfinals)
8. (Kazakhstan) Amir Omarkhanov (first round)
9. (Bulgaria) Ivan Ivanov (semifinals)
10. Timofei Derepasko (third round)
11. (Bulgaria) Alexander Vasilev (quarterfinals)
12. (Poland) Alan Ważny (first round)
13. (Japan) Ryo Tabata (semifinals)
14. (Ukraine) Nikita Bilozertsev (third round)
15. (Czech Republic) Jan Kumstát (first round)
16. (United States) Keaton Hance (second round)

Click on the seed number of a player to go to their draw section.

== Draw ==
Key

- Q = Qualifier
- WC = Wild card
- LL = Lucky loser
- Alt = Alternate
- ITF = ITF entry
- PR = Protected ranking
- SR = Special ranking
- SE = Special exempt
- JE = Junior exempt
- JR = Junior Accelerator Programme entrant
- CO = College Accelerator Programme entrant
- NG = Next Gen Accelerator Program entrant
- w/o = Walkover
- r = Retired
- d = Defaulted

=== Finals ===
Quarterfinals
(Germany) Niels McDonald	7	6
7	(Romania) Yannick Theodor Alexandrescou	5	2
13	(Japan) Ryo Tabata	6	7^{7}
11	(Bulgaria) Alexander Vasilev	3	6^{5}
6	(United States) Benjamin Willwerth	3	6	6^{11}
(Germany) Max Schönhaus	6	1	7^{13}
9	(Bulgaria) Ivan Ivanov	3	6	6
2	(Italy) Jacopo Vasamì	6	4	2

Semifinals
(Germany) Niels McDonald	6	6
13	(Japan) Ryo Tabata	2	2
(Germany) Max Schönhaus	6	6
9	(Bulgaria) Ivan Ivanov	3	4

Final
(Germany) Niels McDonald	6^{5}	6	6
(Germany) Max Schönhaus	7^{7}	0	3

=== Top half ===
==== Section 1 ====
First round
1	(Spain) Andrés Santamarta Roig	6	6
WC	(France) Ferdinand Livet Novkirichka	1	1
(Italy) Pierluigi Basile	7^{7}	5	6
Q	(Australia) Cruz Hewitt	6^{4}	7	3
(Switzerland) Flynn Thomas	1	1
(Germany) Niels McDonald	6	6
(Sweden) William Rejchtman	6	1	3
16	(United States) Keaton Hance	4	6	6
12	(Poland) Alan Ważny	6^{1}	2
(Austria) Thilo Behrmann	7^{7}	6
WC	(France) Daniel Jade	7^{7}	1	2
(United States) Jack Satterfield	6^{4}	6	6
Q	(Finland) Linus Lagerbohm	6	6
(United States) Ryan Cozad	4	3
(United Kingdom) Oliver Bonding	4	3
7	(Romania) Yannick Theodor Alexandrescou	6	6

Second round
1	(Spain) A Santamarta Roig	6	1	6
(Italy) P Basile	4	6	3
(Germany) N McDonald	6	6
16	(United States) K Hance	1	3
(Austria) T Behrmann	4	6	7^{10}
(United States) J Satterfield	6	4	6^{7}
Q	(Finland) L Lagerbohm	2	6^{3}
7	(Romania) YT Alexandrescou	6	7^{7}

Third round
1	(Spain) A Santamarta Roig	4	6	3
(Germany) N McDonald	6	3	6
(Austria) T Behrmann	0	1
7	(Romania) YT Alexandrescou	6	6

Quarterfinals
(Germany) N McDonald	7	6
7	(Romania) YT Alexandrescou	5	2

==== Section 2 ====
First round
4	(United States) Jack Kennedy	6	6
SE	(Turkey) Kerem Yılmaz	1	0
(Argentina) Valentín Garay	5	3
(Netherlands) Thijs Boogaard	7	6
WC	(Brazil) Pedro Henrique Chabalgoity	4	3
WC	(France) Mickaël Kaouk	6	6
(United States) Dominick Mosejczuk	4	4
13	(Japan) Ryo Tabata	6	6
11	(Bulgaria) Alexander Vasilev	6^{3}	7	6
(Puerto Rico) Yannik Álvarez	7^{7}	5	3
Q	(India) Manas Dhamne	5	3
Q	(United States) Ronit Karki	7	6
WC	(France) Aaron Gabet	6	6^{5}	2
Q	Savva Rybkin	4	7^{7}	6
(Colombia) Alejandro Arcila	6	6
8	(Kazakhstan) Amir Omarkhanov	3	4

Second round
4	(United States) J Kennedy	4	6	6
(Netherlands) T Boogaard	6	0	4
WC	(France) M Kaouk	3	2
13	(Japan) R Tabata	6	6
11	(Bulgaria) A Vasilev	1	6	6
Q	(United States) R Karki	6	2	4
Q	S Rybkin	6	6^{3}	7
(Colombia) A Arcila	4	7^{7}	5

Third round
4	(United States) J Kennedy	4	6^{4}
13	(Japan) R Tabata	6	7^{7}
11	(Bulgaria) A Vasilev	6	7
Q	S Rybkin	2	5

Quarterfinals
13	(Japan) R Tabata	6	7^{7}
11	(Bulgaria) A Vasilev	3	6^{5}

=== Bottom half ===
==== Section 3 ====
First round
6	(United States) Benjamin Willwerth	6	7^{8}
(Australia) Ty Host	3	6^{6}
(Sweden) Ludvig Fredrik Hede	4	3
Q	(India) Hitesh Chauhan	6	6
(United States) Maxwell Exsted	6	6
WC	(France) Mathys Domenc	3	4
(Morocco) Karim Bennani	6	4	1
10	Timofei Derepasko	4	6	6
15	(Czech Republic) Jan Kumstát	4	7	4
(Germany) Max Schönhaus	6	5	6
WC	(France) Pierre Antoine Faut	6	6
(Brazil) Luís Miguel	4	4
JGSE	(Japan) Hyu Kawanishi	0	4
(United States) Noah Johnston	6	6
Q	(Romania) Ștefan Horia Haita	6^{9}	6	6
3	(Finland) Oskari Paldanius	7^{11}	3	3

Second round
6	(United States) B Willwerth	6	2	7^{10}
Q	(India) H Chauhan	2	6	6^{6}
(United States) M Exsted	4	4
10	T Derepasko	6	6
(Germany) M Schönhaus	6	7
WC	(France) PA Faut	1	5
(United States) N Johnston	6	3	4
Q	(Romania) ȘH Haita	2	6	6

Third round
6	(United States) B Willwerth	'6	6
10	T Derepasko	4	4
(Germany) M Schönhaus	2	6	6
Q	(Romania) ȘH Haita	6	1	1

Quarterfinals
6	(United States) B Willwerth	3	6	6^{11}
(Germany) M Schönhaus	6	1	7^{13}

==== Section 4 ====
First round
5	(United States) Jagger Leach	6	1	6
(Kazakhstan) Zangar Nurlanuly	1	6	0
Egor Pleshivtsev	2	4
(Chinese Taipei) Chen Kuan-shou	6	6
(United States) Maximus Dussault	3	4
(Argentina) Dante Pagani	6	6
(France) Moïse Kouamé	6	3	2
9	(Bulgaria) Ivan Ivanov	2	6	6
14/SE	(Ukraine) Nikita Bilozertsev	6	6
(Serbia) Ognjen Milić	4	4
WC	(France) Damien Clerc	4	5
(United States) Jack Secord	6	7
Q	(Slovenia) Luka Talan Lopatić	2	4
(Germany) Jamie Mackenzie	6	6
(Brazil) João Pedro Didoni Bonini	0	2
2	(Italy) Jacopo Vasamì	6	6

Second round
5	(United States) J Leach	7	6
(Chinese Taipei) K-s Chen	5	3
(Argentina) D Pagani	2	5
9	(Bulgaria) I Ivanov	6	7
14/SE	(Ukraine) N Bilozertsev	6	6
(United States) J Secord	3	4
(Germany) J Mackenzie	3	6	1
2	(Italy) J Vasamì	6	3	6

Third round
5	(United States) J Leach	6	3	4
9	(Bulgaria) I Ivanov	2	6	6
14/SE	(Ukraine) N Bilozertsev	6	0	1
2	(Italy) J Vasamì	4	6	6

Quarterfinals
9	(Bulgaria) I Ivanov	3	6	6
2	(Italy) J Vasamì	6	4	2

== Qualifying ==
=== Seeds ===
1. (India) Manas Dhamne (qualified)
2. (Australia) Cruz Hewitt (qualified)
3. Savva Rybkin (qualified)
4. (United States) Ronit Karki (qualified)
5. (Italy) Andrea de Marchi (first round)
6. (Italy) Gabriele Crivellaro (first round)
7. (Slovenia) Luka Talan Lopatić (qualified)
8. (Italy) Michele Mecarelli (first round)
9. (United Kingdom) Mark Ceban (qualifying competition)
10. (United States) Matisse Farzam (qualifying competition)
11. (Kazakhstan) Damir Zhalgasbay (qualifying competition)
12. (Brazil) Victor Cunha Winheski de Lima (qualifying competition)
13. (Netherlands) Hidde Schoenmakers (qualifying competition)
14. (Romania) Ștefan Horia Haita (qualified)
15. (South Africa) Connor Doig (qualifying competition)
16. (Japan) Shion Itsusaki (first round)

=== Qualifiers ===
1. (India) Manas Dhamne
2. (Australia) Cruz Hewitt
3. Savva Rybkin
4. (United States) Ronit Karki
5. (Finland) Linus Lagerbohm
6. (India) Hitesh Chauhan
7. (Slovenia) Luka Talan Lopatić
8. (Romania) Ștefan Horia Haita

=== Draw ===
==== First qualifier ====
First round
1	(India) Manas Dhamne	6	6
(Romania) Alejandro Mateo Berge Nourescu	2	2
WC	(France) Timeo Trufelli	3	3
11	(Kazakhstan) Damir Zhalgasbay	6	6

Qualifying competition
1	(India) Manas Dhamne	6	6
11	(Kazakhstan) Damir Zhalgasbay	1	2

==== Second qualifier ====
First round
2	(Australia) Cruz Hewitt	6	7
WC	(France) Pablo Pradat	4	5
(India) Rethin Pranav Senthil Kumar	4	4
13	(Netherlands) Hidde Schoenmakers	6	6

Qualifying competition
2	(Australia) Cruz Hewitt	2	6	6
13	(Netherlands) Hidde Schoenmakers	6	3	3

==== Third qualifier ====
First round
3	Savva Rybkin	5	7^{10}	6
(Spain) Xavi Palomar	7	6^{8}	3
WC	(France) Evan Simon	3	3
15	(South Africa) Connor Doig	6	6

Qualifying competition
3	Savva Rybkin	6	6
15	(South Africa) Connor Doig	4	3

==== Fourth qualifier ====
First round
4	(United States) Ronit Karki	7^{7}	6
WC	(France) Benoît Geldof	6^{5}	2
(Turkey) Haydar Cem Gökpınar	6	7
16	(Japan) Shion Itsusaki	0	5

Qualifying competition
4	(United States) Ronit Karki	6	6
(Turkey) Haydar Cem Gökpınar	2	3

==== Fifth qualifier ====
First round
5	(Italy) Andrea de Marchi	3	4
(Finland) Linus Lagerbohm	6	6
(Spain) Tito Chávez	5	6	0
9	(United Kingdom) Mark Ceban	7	4	6

Qualifying competition
(Finland) Linus Lagerbohm	6^{4}	7^{7}	6
9	(United Kingdom) Mark Ceban	7^{7}	6^{2}	3

==== Sixth qualifier ====
First round
6	(Italy) Gabriele Crivellaro	3	0
(India) Hitesh Chauhan	6	6
(United States) Lachlan Gaskell	2	1
12	(Brazil) Victor Cunha Winheski de Lima	6	6

Qualifying competition
(India) Hitesh Chauhan	7	2	7
12	(Brazil) Victor Cunha Winheski de Lima	5	6	5

==== Seventh qualifier ====
First round
7	(Slovenia) Luka Talan Lopatić	6	6
WC	(France) Sasha Colleu	3	4
(Brazil) Gustavo Albieri	3	6	5
10	(United States) Matisse Farzam	6	2	7

Qualifying competition
7	(Slovenia) Luka Talan Lopatić	4	7	6
10	(United States) Matisse Farzam	6	5	4

==== Eighth qualifier ====
First round
8	(Italy) Michele Mecarelli	3	4
(Spain) Sergio Planella Hernández	6	6
WC	(France) Lenny Couturier	0	6^{4}
14	(Romania) Ștefan Horia Haita	6	7^{7}

Qualifying competition
(Spain) Sergio Planella Hernández	6	2	4
14	(Romania) Ștefan Horia Haita	1	6	6
