= 2025 French Open – Boys' doubles =

Boys' doubles
- 2025 French Open

Final
- Champions: (Finland) Oskari Paldanius (Poland) Alan Ważny
- Runners-up: (United States) Noah Johnston (United States) Benjamin Willwerth
- Score: 6–2, 6–3

Events
Singles	men	women		boys	girls
Doubles	men	women	mixed	boys	girls
WC Singles	men	women	quad	boys	girls
WC Doubles	men	women	quad	boys	girls
- French Open

Oskari Paldanius and Alan Ważny won the boys' doubles title at the 2025 French Open, defeating Noah Johnston and Benjamin Willwerth in the final, 6–2, 6–3.

Nicolai Budkov Kjær and Joel Schwärzler were the reigning champions, but were no longer eligible to participate in junior events.

== Seeds ==
1. (Kazakhstan) Amir Omarkhanov / (Spain) Andrés Santamarta Roig (first round)
2. (Finland) Oskari Paldanius / (Poland) Alan Ważny (champions)
3. (United States) Keaton Hance / (United States) Jack Kennedy (semifinals)
4. (Romania) Yannick Theodor Alexandrescou / (Japan) Ryo Tabata (quarterfinals)
5. (Netherlands) Thijs Boogaard / (Bulgaria) Ivan Ivanov (quarterfinals)
6. (Italy) Pierluigi Basile / (Italy) Jacopo Vasamì (first round)
7. (United States) Noah Johnston / (United States) Benjamin Willwerth (final)
8. (United Kingdom) Oliver Bonding / (United States) Jagger Leach (semifinals)

== Draw ==
Key

- Q = Qualifier
- WC = Wild card
- LL = Lucky loser
- Alt = Alternate
- ITF = ITF entry
- PR = Protected ranking
- SR = Special ranking
- SE = Special exempt
- JE = Junior exempt
- JR = Junior Accelerator Programme entrant
- CO = College Accelerator Programme entrant
- NG = Next Gen Accelerator Program entrant
- w/o = Walkover
- r = Retired
- d = Defaulted

=== Finals ===
Semifinals
7	(United States) Noah Johnston (United States) Benjamin Willwerth	6	2	[10]
8	(United Kingdom) Oliver Bonding (United States) Jagger Leach	4	6	[7]
3	(United States) Keaton Hance (United States) Jack Kennedy	1	2
2	(Finland) Oskari Paldanius (Poland) Alan Ważny	6	6

Final
7	(United States) Noah Johnston (United States) Benjamin Willwerth	2	3
2	(Finland) Oskari Paldanius (Poland) Alan Ważny	6	6

=== Top half ===
First round
1	(Kazakhstan) Amir Omarkhanov (Spain) Andrés Santamarta Roig	2	6	[6]
(Argentina) Valentín Garay (Argentina) Dante Pagani	6	2	[10]
(Finland) Linus Lagerbohm (Sweden) William Rejchtman	7^{7}	3	[10]
(Morocco) Karim Bennani (Australia) Ty Host	6^{3}	6	[7]
(Sweden) Ludvig Fredrik Hede (Switzerland) Flynn Thomas	5	3
(India) Hitesh Chauhan (Turkey) Haydar Cem Gökpınar	7	6
WC	(France) Mathys Domenc (France) Ferdinand Livet Novkirichka	4	3
7	(United States) Noah Johnston (United States) Benjamin Willwerth	6	6
4	(Romania) Yannick Theodor Alexandrescou (Japan) Ryo Tabata	7	6
(United States) Ryan Cozad (United States) Maximus Dussault	5	4
Timofei Derepasko (Brazil) Luís Miguel	6	6
(Brazil) Pedro Henrique Chabalgoity (Romania) Ștefan Horia Haita	2	1
WC	(France) Damien Clerc (France) Lenny Couturier	4	6	[9]
(Austria) Thilo Behrmann (Ukraine) Nikita Bilozertsev	6	4	[11]
(Brazil) João Pedro Didoni Bonini (Australia) Cruz Hewitt	3	5
8	(United Kingdom) Oliver Bonding (United States) Jagger Leach	6	7

Second round
(Argentina) V Garay (Argentina) D Pagani	4	6^{0}
(Finland) L Lagerbohm (Sweden) W Rejchtman	6	7^{7}
(India) H Chauhan (Turkey) HC Gökpınar	1	4
7	(United States) N Johnston (United States) B Willwerth	6	6
4	(Romania) YT Alexandrescou (Japan) R Tabata	6	7
T Derepasko (Brazil) L Miguel	2	5
(Austria) T Behrmann (Ukraine) N Bilozertsev	6	3	[6]
8	(United Kingdom) O Bonding (United States) J Leach	4	6	[10]

Quarterfinals
(Finland) L Lagerbohm (Sweden) W Rejchtman	6	3	[8]
7	(United States) N Johnston (United States) B Willwerth	4	6	[10]
4	(Romania) YT Alexandrescou (Japan) R Tabata	3	4
8	(United Kingdom) O Bonding (United States) J Leach	6	6

Semifinals
7	(United States) N Johnston (United States) B Willwerth	6	2	[10]
8	(United Kingdom) O Bonding (United States) J Leach	4	6	[7]

=== Bottom half ===
First round
6	(Italy) Pierluigi Basile (Italy) Jacopo Vasamì	4	6^{5}
(Puerto Rico) Yannik Álvarez (United States) Jack Secord	6	7^{7}
(Germany) Jamie Mackenzie (Germany) Niels McDonald	5	6	[7]
(United States) Maxwell Exsted (Bulgaria) Alexander Vasilev	7	2	[10]
(Kazakhstan) Zangar Nurlanuly (Turkey) Kerem Yılmaz	0	2
(Colombia) Alejandro Arcila (United States) Dominick Mosejczuk	6	6
WC	(France) Pierre Antoine Faut (France) Daniel Jade	3	4
3	(United States) Keaton Hance (United States) Jack Kennedy	6	6
5	(Netherlands) Thijs Boogaard (Bulgaria) Ivan Ivanov	4	7^{7}	[11]
(Czech Republic) Jan Kumstát (Germany) Max Schönhaus	6	6^{4}	[9]
(Serbia) Ognjen Milić; Egor Pleshivtsev	7^{7}	6
(Chinese Taipei) Chen Kuan-shou (Japan) Hyu Kawanishi	6^{3}	3
(United States) Ronit Karki (United States) Jack Satterfield	6	6
WC	(France) Benoît Geldof (France) Pablo Pradat	2	2
Savva Rybkin (Slovenia) Luka Talan Lopatić	2	0
2	(Finland) Oskari Paldanius (Poland) Alan Ważny	6	6

Second round
(Puerto Rico) Y Álvarez (United States) J Secord	1	4
(United States) M Exsted (Bulgaria) A Vasilev	6	6
(Colombia) A Arcila (United States) D Mosejczuk	3	4
3	(United States) K Hance (United States) J Kennedy	6	6
5	(Netherlands) T Boogaard (Bulgaria) I Ivanov	7	6
(Serbia) O Milić; E Pleshivtsev	5	2
(United States) R Karki (United States) J Satterfield	6	4	[5]
2	(Finland) O Paldanius (Poland) A Ważny	4	6	[10]

Quarterfinals
(United States) M Exsted (Bulgaria) A Vasilev	2	4
3	(United States) K Hance (United States) J Kennedy	6	6
5	(Netherlands) T Boogaard (Bulgaria) I Ivanov	4	4
2	(Finland) O Paldanius (Poland) A Ważny	6	6

Semifinals
3	(United States) K Hance (United States) J Kennedy	1	2
2	(Finland) O Paldanius (Poland) A Ważny	6	6
