= 2025 French Open – Wheelchair men's doubles =

Wheelchair men's doubles
- 2025 French Open

Final
- Champions: (United Kingdom) Alfie Hewett (United Kingdom) Gordon Reid
- Runners-up: (France) Stéphane Houdet (Japan) Tokito Oda
- Score: 6–4, 1–6, [10–7]

Events
Singles	men	women		boys	girls
Doubles	men	women	mixed	boys	girls
WC Singles	men	women	quad	boys	girls
WC Doubles	men	women	quad	boys	girls
- French Open

Five-time defending champions Alfie Hewett and Gordon Reid defeated Stéphane Houdet and Tokito Oda in the final, 6–4, 1–6, [10–7] to win the men's doubles wheelchair tennis title at the 2025 French Open.

== Seeds ==
1. (United Kingdom) Alfie Hewett / (United Kingdom) Gordon Reid (champions)
2. (Spain) Martín de la Puente / (Netherlands) Ruben Spaargaren (quarterfinals)

== Draw ==
Key

- Q = Qualifier
- WC = Wild card
- LL = Lucky loser
- Alt = Alternate
- ITF = ITF entry
- PR = Protected ranking
- SR = Special ranking
- SE = Special exempt
- JE = Junior exempt
- JR = Junior Accelerator Programme entrant
- CO = College Accelerator Programme entrant
- NG = Next Gen Accelerator Program entrant
- w/o = Walkover
- r = Retired
- d = Defaulted

=== Draw ===
Quarterfinals
1	(United Kingdom) Alfie Hewett (United Kingdom) Gordon Reid	6	4	[10]
(Chile) Alexander Cataldo (Israel) Sergei Lysov	1	6	[4]
(France) Nicolas Charrier (France) Gaëtan Menguy	1	4
(Japan) Takuya Miki (United States) Casey Ratzlaff	6	6
(Netherlands) Tom Egberink (Belgium) Joachim Gérard	6	2	[3]
(France) Stéphane Houdet (Japan) Tokito Oda	3	6	[10]
(Spain) Daniel Caverzaschi (Argentina) Gustavo Fernández	6	7^{7}
2	(Spain) Martín de la Puente (Netherlands) Ruben Spaargaren	2	6^{2}

Semifinals
1	(United Kingdom) Alfie Hewett (United Kingdom) Gordon Reid	6	6
(Japan) Takuya Miki (United States) Casey Ratzlaff	2	3
(France) Stéphane Houdet (Japan) Tokito Oda	6	3
(Spain) Daniel Caverzaschi (Argentina) Gustavo Fernández	2	4^{r}

Final
1	(United Kingdom) Alfie Hewett (United Kingdom) Gordon Reid	6	1	[10]
(France) Stéphane Houdet (Japan) Tokito Oda	4	6	[7]
