= Guy Sasson =

Israeli wheelchair tennis player

Guy Sasson גיא ששון
- Country (sports): Israel
- Born: 28 April 1980 (age 46) Ramat Gan, Israel
- Turned pro: 2018
- Plays: Right-handed (one-handed backhand)
- Coach: Ofri Lankri

Singles
- Career record: 253–123
- Highest ranking: No. 2 (4 November 2024)
- Current ranking: No. 3 (22 June 2026)

Grand Slam singles results
- Australian Open: F (2024)
- French Open: W (2024, 2025)
- Wimbledon: SF (2024, 2026)
- US Open: SF (2025)

Other tournaments
- Masters: SF (2023)

Doubles
- Career record: 166–61
- Highest ranking: No. 1 (16 March 2026)
- Current ranking: No. 1 (22 June 2026)

Grand Slam doubles results
- Australian Open: W (2026)
- French Open: W (2025, 2026)
- Wimbledon: W (2025, 2026)
- US Open: W (2025)
Medal record
Men's wheelchair tennis
Representing Israel
Paralympic Games
Bronze medal – third place	2024 Paris	Quad singles

Guy Sasson (Hebrew: גיא ששון; born April 28, 1980) is an Israeli wheelchair tennis player. He is a multi-time Grand Slam champion having won two singles majors at the 2024 and 2025 French Opens, and six major doubles titles.

In 2015, Sasson suffered a severe spinal cord injury in a snowboarding accident in the French Alps, leaving him paralyzed from the knees down. Following surgery and extensive rehabilitation, he began playing competitive wheelchair tennis in 2018.

His highest world ranking in singles is No. 2, and in doubles is No. 1, in 2024 and 2026 respectively. He won a bronze medal for Israel at the 2024 Summer Paralympics in the Quad singles event.

In quad doubles, Sasson plays alongside regular partner Niels Vink of the Netherlands. The pair won three consecutive Grand Slam titles in 2025 (the French Open, Wimbledon, and US Open), and swept the first three majors of the 2026 season (the Australian Open, French Open, and Wimbledon). By winning the first three majors of 2026, Sasson and Vink entered the 2026 US Open with the opportunity to complete a first-ever calendar-year Grand Slam in the wheelchair quad doubles division, but lost in the championship round in a tie-breaker.

== Early and personal life ==
Sasson was born and grew up in Ramat Gan, Israel, and is Jewish. His parents are Nissim, who worked in real estate, and Venus, who worked in education, and he has two younger brothers. Sasson attended Blich High School in Ramat Gan, where he played for the school's soccer team and won a national championship before competing in the high school world championship in Lima, Peru in 1997. He played tennis as a child, served in the Israel Defense Forces, and then attended the University of Michigan business school where he earned a Bachelor of Business Administration (BBA) degree with a specialization in finance in 2006.

Sasson then returned to Israel, where he earned a Master of Business Administration (MBA) with a focus on real estate from the University of Haifa. After graduating he founded a property management, real estate investment, and urban renewal firm named IsraMich Investments.

He married Aya Mohr (now Dr. Aya Mohr-Sasson, an obstetrician-gynecologist). Sasson and his wife have four children. His brother spent two months in the IDF reserves in Gaza.

== Snowboarding accident ==
In January 2015 Sasson was paralyzed from the knees down in a snowboarding accident in Val Thorens in the French Alps after he fell 10 meters (33 feet) and injured his back, spine, leg, and hand. He was flown to Tel Hashomer Hospital in Ramat Gan, Israel, where he had major surgery for his severe traumatic spinal cord damage, stabilizing his fractured spinal vertebrae, and repairing nerve damage and severe injuries to his left hand.

He was told by the doctors that the neurological damage had left him permanently paralyzed from the knees down, and that he would remain wheelchair-dependent for the rest of his life, not able to walk again. After spending well over a year in a rehab hospital following a grueling daily physical rehabilitation regimen, he was able to walk out, albeit with the help of braces and canes.

Although he achieved partial upright mobility, he remains permanently paralyzed in his lower limbs, and relies on a combination of leg braces and orthopedic canes to walk.

== Wheelchair tennis career ==
=== 2018–23 ===
Sasson began playing competitive wheelchair tennis seriously in 2018 at the Israel ParaSport Center in Ramat Gan. He is coached by former professional tennis player Ofri Lankri. Just a year after beginning dedicated training, he won the men's singles title at the 2019 Israel Wheelchair Tennis Championship.

He competed for Israel in the Tokyo Paralympic Games in 2021, coming in 9th. In May 2023, Sasson was a member of the Israeli quad team that won a silver medal at the BNP Paribas World Team Cup in Vilamoura, Portugal.

=== 2024–25 ===
Sasson competed in the 2024 U.S. Open in New York City, where he reached the quarterfinals in both wheelchair quad singles and doubles. In May 2023 he was part of the Israeli quad wheelchair tennis team that won the silver medal at the world championship in Portugal. Later that year, he made his Grand Slam debut at the 2023 US Open in New York City, advancing to the quad quarterfinals in both the singles and doubles draws.

He won the singles championship in the 2024 Victorian Wheelchair Open, and the quad doubles championship in the 2024 Melbourne Wheelchair Open. In the 2024 Australian Open, Sasson reached the finals in both the quad singles and the quad doubles.

Sasson won his first major title at the 2024 French Open, defeating Sam Schröder of the Netherlands in the final of the Quad Singles event in a final set tiebreaker. He dedicated his victory to Israel and to the four hostages who were released from captivity in Gaza on that day. He also reached the finals in the 2024 Australian Open in both singles and doubles.

Sasson won a bronze medal for Israel at the 2024 Paris Paralympics in Quad singles, defeating Ahmet Kaplan of Turkey in the bronze medal match.

At the 2025 French Open, Sasson partnered with Niels Vink of the Netherlands to win his first Grand Slam doubles title.

Sasson also won the 2025 French Open singles championship, and swept the 2025 Wimbledon Championships and 2025 US Open doubles crowns with Vink.

=== 2026–present ===
Sasson and Vink began the following year by winning the 2026 Australian Open quad doubles championship.

They then retained their quad doubles title at the 2026 French Open, making it back-to-back victories at Roland Garros.

In July 2026, Sasson and Vink won their sixth consecutive Grand Slam doubles title as a team at the 2026 Wimbledon Championships, beating Sam Schröder and Jin Woodman in the final.

== Career statistics ==
=== Performance timelines ===
Key
W	F	SF	QF	#R	RR	Q#	P#	DNQ	A	Z#	PO	G	S	B	NMS	NTI	P	NH

(W) winner; (F) finalist; (SF) semifinalist; (QF) quarterfinalist; (#R) rounds 4, 3, 2, 1; (RR) round-robin stage; (Q#) qualification round; (P#) preliminary round; (DNQ) did not qualify; (A) absent; (Z#) Davis/Fed Cup Zonal Group (with number indication) or (PO) play-off; (G) gold, (S) silver or (B) bronze Olympic/Paralympic medal; (NMS) not a Masters tournament; (NTI) not a Tier I tournament; (P) postponed; (NH) not held; (SR) strike rate (events won / competed); (W–L) win–loss record.
To avoid confusion and double counting, these charts are updated at the conclusion of a tournament or when the player's participation has ended.

==== Quad Singles ====
Tournament	2023	2024	2025	2026	SR	W–L
Australian Open	A	F	SF	SF	0 / 3	7–3
French Open	A	W	W	SF	2 / 3	7–1
Wimbledon	A	SF	QF	SF	0 / 3	2–3
US Open	QF	NH	SF	SF	0 / 3	5–3
Win–loss	1–1	7–2	7–3	6–4	2 / 12	21–10

==== Quad doubles ====
Tournament	2023	2024	2025	2026	SR	W–L
Australian Open	A	F	F	W	1 / 3	
French Open	A	F	W	W	2 / 3	
Wimbledon	A	F	W	W	2 / 3	
US Open	QF	NH	W		1 / 2	
Win–loss					6/11	

=== Quad singles: 3 (2 titles, 1 runner-up) ===
Result	Year	Tournament	Surface	Opponent	Score
Loss	2024	Australian Open	Hard	(Netherlands) Sam Schröder	3–6, 3–6
Win	2024	French Open	Clay	(Netherlands) Sam Schröder	6–2, 3–6, 7–6^{(10–7)}
Win	2025	French Open	Clay	(Netherlands) Niels Vink	6–4, 7–5

=== Quad doubles: 11 (6 titles, 5 runner-ups) ===
Result	Year	Tournament	Surface	Partner	Opponents	Score
Loss	2024	Australian Open	Hard	(South Africa) Donald Ramphadi	(United Kingdom) Andy Lapthorne (United States) David Wagner	4–6, 6–3, [2–10]
Loss	2024	French Open	Clay	(United Kingdom) Andy Lapthorne	(Netherlands) Niels Vink (Netherlands) Sam Schröder	6–7^{(9–11)}, 1–6
Loss	2024	Wimbledon	Grass	(Netherlands) Niels Vink	(South Africa) Donald Ramphadi (United Kingdom) Gregory Slade	6–3,6–7^{(3–7)}, 3–6
Loss	2025	Australian Open	Hard	(Netherlands) Niels Vink	(United Kingdom) Andy Lapthorne (Netherlands) Sam Schröder	1–6, 4–6
Win	2025	French Open	Clay	(Netherlands) Niels Vink	(Turkey) Ahmet Kaplan (South Africa) Donald Ramphadi	6–3, 6–4
Win	2025	Wimbledon	Grass	(Netherlands) Niels Vink	(South Africa) Donald Ramphadi (United Kingdom) Gregory Slade	6–0, 6–2
Win	2025	US Open	Hard	(Netherlands) Niels Vink	(Chile) Francisco Cayulef (Argentina) Gonzalo Enrique Lazarte	6–1, 6–1
Win	2026	Australian Open	Hard	(Netherlands) Niels Vink	(Australia) Heath Davidson (United Kingdom) Andy Lapthorne	6–3, 6–1
Win	2026	French Open	Clay	(Netherlands) Niels Vink	(Netherlands) Sam Schröder (Australia) Jin Woodman	6–4, 6–3
Win	2026	Wimbledon	Grass	(Netherlands) Niels Vink	(Netherlands) Sam Schröder (Australia) Jin Woodman	6–2, 6–1
Loss	2026	US Open	Hard	(Netherlands) Niels Vink	(Netherlands) Sam Schröder (Australia) Jin Woodman	3–6, 6–2, [7–10]

== See also ==
- List of Australian Open champions
- List of French Open champions
- List of US Open champions
- List of Wimbledon champions
- List of Grand Slam and related tennis records
- List of quad wheelchair tennis champions
- Israel at the Paralympics
