= 2024 US Open – Women's singles qualifying =

Women's singles qualifying
- 2024 US Open

Events
Singles	men	women		boys	girls
Doubles	men	women	mixed	boys	girls
WC Singles	men	women	quad
WC Doubles	men	women	quad
Legends	men	women	mixed

Qualification
Singles	men	women
← 2023 ·	US Open	· 2025 →

The 2024 US Open – Women's singles qualifying is a series of tennis matches that took place from August 19 to 22, 2024 to determine the sixteen qualifiers into the main draw of the women's singles tournament, and, if necessary, the lucky losers.

== Seeds ==
Seedings are based on WTA rankings as of August 12, 2024.

1. Kamilla Rakhimova (qualifying competition, lucky loser)
2. Aliaksandra Sasnovich (qualified)
3. (United States) Hailey Baptiste (qualifying competition)
4. (Japan) Mai Hontama (second round)
5. (Spain) Rebeka Masarova (first round)
6. (United States) Robin Montgomery (first round)
7. (Croatia) Jana Fett (first round)
8. (Serbia) Olga Danilović (first round)
9. (Germany) Eva Lys (qualified)
10. (Slovakia) Rebecca Šramková (second round)
11. (United States) Ann Li (qualified)
12. (Spain) Marina Bassols Ribera (qualified)
13. (United States) Alycia Parks (second round)
14. (Romania) Anca Todoni (first round)
15. (Spain) Nuria Párrizas Díaz (second round)
16. (Australia) Arina Rodionova (qualified)
17. (China) Bai Zhuoxuan (first round)
18. (United States) Emina Bektas (first round)
19. (Argentina) Julia Riera (second round)
20. (Romania) Elena-Gabriela Ruse (qualified)
21. (Netherlands) Suzan Lamens (first round)
22. (Hungary) Dalma Gálfi (first round)
23. (Ukraine) Daria Snigur (second round)
24. (United States) Sachia Vickery (first round)
25. Anastasia Zakharova (first round)
26. (Brazil) Laura Pigossi (first round)
27. (Czech Republic) Sára Bejlek (first round)
28. (Germany) Ella Seidel (second round)
29. (Latvia) Darja Semeņistaja (first round)
30. (Colombia) Emiliana Arango (first round)
31. (United Kingdom) Lily Miyazaki (qualifying competition)
32. (Australia) Maya Joint (qualified)

== Qualifiers ==
1. (Australia) Priscilla Hon
2. Aliaksandra Sasnovich
3. (Australia) Maya Joint
4. (Australia) Destanee Aiava
5. (Japan) Ena Shibahara
6. (Australia) Kimberly Birrell
7. (France) Jessika Ponchet
8. (Ukraine) Yuliia Starodubtseva
9. (Germany) Eva Lys
10. (Argentina) Solana Sierra
11. (United States) Ann Li
12. (Spain) Marina Bassols Ribera
13. (United States) Varvara Lepchenko
14. (Japan) Nao Hibino
15. (Romania) Elena-Gabriela Ruse
16. (Australia) Arina Rodionova

== Lucky loser ==
1. Kamilla Rakhimova

== Qualifying draw ==
=== First qualifier ===
First round
1	Kamilla Rakhimova	6	6
Oksana Selekhmeteva	3	2
(Portugal) Francisca Jorge	5	4
Maria Timofeeva	7	6
WC	(United States) Akasha Urhobo	3	6	3
(Australia) Priscilla Hon	6	3	6
Valeria Savinykh	4	4
23	(Ukraine) Daria Snigur	6	6

Second round
1	Kamilla Rakhimova	6	6
Maria Timofeeva	3	0
(Australia) Priscilla Hon	6	6
23	(Ukraine) Daria Snigur	1	0

Qualifying competition
1	Kamilla Rakhimova	6^{4}	7^{7}	4
(Australia) Priscilla Hon	7^{7}	6^{2}	6

=== Second qualifier ===
First round
2	Aliaksandra Sasnovich	6	6
(France) Harmony Tan	2	3
(United Kingdom) Heather Watson	6	6
WC	(United States) Clervie Ngounoue	1	1
(United States) Maria Mateas	6	6^{5}	4
(Switzerland) Jil Teichmann	3	7^{7}	6
(Turkey) Zeynep Sönmez	6	6
22	(Hungary) Dalma Gálfi	3	4

Second round
2	Aliaksandra Sasnovich	6	6
(United Kingdom) Heather Watson	1	4
(Switzerland) Jil Teichmann	5	0
(Turkey) Zeynep Sönmez	7	6

Qualifying competition
2	Aliaksandra Sasnovich	6	7^{9}
(Turkey) Zeynep Sönmez	2	6^{7}

=== Third qualifier ===
First round
3	(United States) Hailey Baptiste	6	6
WC	(United States) Tyra Caterina Grant	0	3
WC	(United States) Liv Hovde	3	4
PR	(Germany) Nastasja Schunk	6	6
(Japan) Sara Saito	4	3
Iryna Shymanovich	6	6
(Poland) Maja Chwalińska	0	3
32	(Australia) Maya Joint	6	6

Second round
3	(United States) Hailey Baptiste	6	6
PR	(Germany) Nastasja Schunk	1	4
Iryna Shymanovich	5	6	0
32	(Australia) Maya Joint	7	3	6

Qualifying competition
3	(United States) Hailey Baptiste	2	1
32	(Australia) Maya Joint	6	6

=== Fourth qualifier ===
First round
4	(Japan) Mai Hontama	3	7	6
Anastasia Tikhonova	6	5	1
(Australia) Destanee Aiava	6	6
(Bulgaria) Gergana Topalova	3	0
(Romania) Miriam Bulgaru	2	4
PR	(Croatia) Ana Konjuh	6	6
(North Macedonia) Lina Gjorcheska	6^{4}	3
19	(Argentina) Julia Riera	7^{7}	6

Second round
4	(Japan) Mai Hontama	3	4
(Australia) Destanee Aiava	6	6
PR	(Croatia) Ana Konjuh	6	1	6
19	(Argentina) Julia Riera	3	6	3

Qualifying competition
(Australia) Destanee Aiava	6	6
PR	(Croatia) Ana Konjuh	3	2

=== Fifth qualifier ===
First round
5	(Spain) Rebeka Masarova	1	6	6^{6}
(United Kingdom) Francesca Jones	6	2	7^{10}
(Japan) Ena Shibahara	6	2	6
(Ukraine) Katarina Zavatska	0	6	4
(Canada) Rebecca Marino	6	6
PR	(Belgium) Ysaline Bonaventure	2	3
(Netherlands) Arianne Hartono	6	6
21	(Netherlands) Suzan Lamens	3	3

Second round
(United Kingdom) Francesca Jones	4	1^{r}
(Japan) Ena Shibahara	6	4
(Canada) Rebecca Marino	4	5
(Netherlands) Arianne Hartono	6	7

Qualifying competition
(Japan) Ena Shibahara	3	6	6
(Netherlands) Arianne Hartono	6	1	4

=== Sixth qualifier ===
First round
6	(United States) Robin Montgomery	6^{4}	6	2
(Australia) Kimberly Birrell	7^{7}	4	6
(Slovenia) Veronika Erjavec	6	6
(France) Manon Léonard	2	4
WC	(United States) Julieta Pareja	7^{7}	6
(United States) Kayla Day	6^{5}	4
(Italy) Lucrezia Stefanini	6	4	6
30	(Colombia) Emiliana Arango	3	6	1

Second round
(Australia) Kimberly Birrell	6	6
(Slovenia) Veronika Erjavec	4	4
WC	(United States) Julieta Pareja	7^{7}	1	6
(Italy) Lucrezia Stefanini	6^{4}	6	4

Qualifying competition
(Australia) Kimberly Birrell	6	6
WC	(United States) Julieta Pareja	3	3

=== Seventh qualifier ===
First round
7	(Croatia) Jana Fett	2	1
(France) Jessika Ponchet	6	6
Aliona Falei	7^{7}	3	4
(Croatia) Lucija Ćirić Bagarić	6^{5}	6	6
(Ukraine) Anastasiia Sobolieva	4	4
PR	(Sweden) Mirjam Björklund	6	6
(United States) Elizabeth Mandlik	6	6
27	(Czech Republic) Sára Bejlek	3	4

Second round
(France) Jessika Ponchet	6	7^{7}
(Croatia) Lucija Ćirić Bagarić	1	6^{2}
PR	(Sweden) Mirjam Björklund	4	4
(United States) Elizabeth Mandlik	6	6

Qualifying competition
(France) Jessika Ponchet	7	7^{7}
(United States) Elizabeth Mandlik	5	6^{5}

=== Eighth qualifier ===
First round
8	(Serbia) Olga Danilović	6	4	4
(China) Gao Xinyu	4	6	6
(Ukraine) Yuliia Starodubtseva	6	6
(Andorra) Victoria Jiménez Kasintseva	2	1
(Spain) Guiomar Maristany	3	3
(United Kingdom) Sonay Kartal	6	6
(Switzerland) Simona Waltert	6	6
18	(United States) Emina Bektas	4	4

Second round
(China) Gao Xinyu	3	6	0
(Ukraine) Yuliia Starodubtseva	6	4	6
(United Kingdom) Sonay Kartal	6	6
(Switzerland) Simona Waltert	3	2

Qualifying competition
(Ukraine) Yuliia Starodubtseva	2	6	6
(United Kingdom) Sonay Kartal	6	3	3

=== Ninth qualifier ===
First round
9	(Germany) Eva Lys	6	7^{7}
(Czech Republic) Gabriela Knutson	2	6^{4}
(Australia) Olivia Gadecki	6	4	7^{11}
(Slovakia) Viktória Hrunčáková	4	6	6^{9}
(Liechtenstein) Kathinka von Deichmann	6	6
(Czech Republic) Linda Klimovičová	4	1
(Slovenia) Dalila Jakupović	2	4
31	(United Kingdom) Lily Miyazaki	6	6

Second round
9	(Germany) Eva Lys	6	4	6
(Australia) Olivia Gadecki	3	6	1
(Liechtenstein) Kathinka von Deichmann	6	2	2
31	(United Kingdom) Lily Miyazaki	1	6	6

Qualifying competition
9	(Germany) Eva Lys	6	6
31	(United Kingdom) Lily Miyazaki	1	2

=== Tenth qualifier ===
First round
10	(Slovakia) Rebecca Šramková	6	6
PR	(Serbia) Nina Stojanović	3	4
WC	(United States) Kristina Penickova	5	4
PR	(United States) Usue Maitane Arconada	7	6
Ekaterina Makarova	4	3
(Argentina) Solana Sierra	6	6
PR	(Spain) Aliona Bolsova	6	6^{6}	4
28	(Germany) Ella Seidel	1	7^{8}	6

Second round
10	(Slovakia) Rebecca Šramková	3	4
PR	(United States) Usue Maitane Arconada	6	6
(Argentina) Solana Sierra	3	7	6
28	(Germany) Ella Seidel	6	5	2

Qualifying competition
PR	(United States) Usue Maitane Arconada	6	6^{4}	1
(Argentina) Solana Sierra	1	7^{7}	6

=== Eleventh qualifier ===
First round
11	(United States) Ann Li	2	6	6
(Thailand) Lanlana Tararudee	6	4	4
(Australia) Astra Sharma	7^{7}	2	6
(France) Margaux Rouvroy	6^{5}	6	3
WC	(United States) Sophie Chang	6	2	5
(France) Séléna Janicijevic	3	6	7
(Croatia) Lea Bošković	6	4	6
29	(Latvia) Darja Semeņistaja	2	6	3

Second round
11	(United States) Ann Li	6	6
(Australia) Astra Sharma	4	4
(France) Séléna Janicijevic	3	4
(Croatia) Lea Bošković	6	6

Qualifying competition
11	(United States) Ann Li	7	6
(Croatia) Lea Bošković	5	3

=== Twelfth qualifier ===
First round
12	(Spain) Marina Bassols Ribera	6	6
(Poland) Katarzyna Kawa	4	0
WC	(United States) Mary Stoiana	7^{7}	7^{7}
Polina Kudermetova	6^{3}	6^{3}
(United States) Hanna Chang	6	6
(France) Léolia Jeanjean	1	3
(Australia) Talia Gibson	7^{7}	1	6
25	Anastasia Zakharova	6^{4}	6	3

Second round
12	(Spain) Marina Bassols Ribera	6	6
WC	(United States) Mary Stoiana	3	3
(United States) Hanna Chang	3	6	6^{10}
(Australia) Talia Gibson	6	1	7^{12}

Qualifying competition
12	(Spain) Marina Bassols Ribera	6	6
(Australia) Talia Gibson	3	4

=== Thirteenth qualifier ===
First round
13	(United States) Alycia Parks	6	6
(Spain) Leyre Romero Gormaz	3	4
(Greece) Despina Papamichail	6	2	6
(United States) Louisa Chirico	4	6	1
(United States) Varvara Lepchenko	6	6
(Slovenia) Tamara Zidanšek	2	3
WC	(United States) Valerie Glozman	6	6^{5}	6
17	(China) Bai Zhuoxuan	1	7^{7}	2

Second round
13	(United States) Alycia Parks	5	7	2
(Greece) Despina Papamichail	7	5	6
(United States) Varvara Lepchenko	4	6	6
WC	(United States) Valerie Glozman	6	4	3

Qualifying competition
(Greece) Despina Papamichail	3	3
(United States) Varvara Lepchenko	6	6

=== Fourteenth qualifier ===
First round
14	(Romania) Anca Todoni	7	4	4
(Japan) Nao Hibino	5	6	6
(Czech Republic) Linda Fruhvirtová	6	3	3
(France) Kristina Mladenovic	3	6	6
(Germany) Mona Barthel	7	5	2
(South Korea) Jang Su-jeong	5	7	6
(China) Wei Sijia	6	7
24	(United States) Sachia Vickery	4	5

Second round
(Japan) Nao Hibino	6	3	6
(France) Kristina Mladenovic	4	6	4
(South Korea) Jang Su-jeong	6	2
(China) Wei Sijia	3	0^{r}

Qualifying competition
(Japan) Nao Hibino	1	6	6
(South Korea) Jang Su-jeong	6	2	0

=== Fifteenth qualifier ===
First round
15	(Spain) Nuria Párrizas Díaz	7^{8}	2	6
Julia Avdeeva	6^{6}	6	4
(Australia) Maddison Inglis	3	6	1
(Philippines) Alexandra Eala	6	2	6
PR	(Kazakhstan) Zarina Diyas	4	4
(China) Ma Yexin	6	6
(Croatia) Antonia Ružić	2	2
20	(Romania) Elena-Gabriela Ruse	6	6

Second round
15	(Spain) Nuria Párrizas Díaz	5	5
(Philippines) Alexandra Eala	7	7
(China) Ma Yexin	3	3
20	(Romania) Elena-Gabriela Ruse	6	6

Qualifying competition
(Philippines) Alexandra Eala	6	1	4
20	(Romania) Elena-Gabriela Ruse	3	6	6

=== Sixteenth qualifier ===
First round
16	(Australia) Arina Rodionova	6	7^{7}
(France) Elsa Jacquemot	1	6^{5}
(Romania) Irina Bara	3	6	7
(China) You Xiaodi	6	3	5
(Switzerland) Céline Naef	6	3	6
(Canada) Marina Stakusic	3	6	4
(Thailand) Mananchaya Sawangkaew	6	6
26	(Brazil) Laura Pigossi	4	0

Second round
16	(Australia) Arina Rodionova	6	6
(Romania) Irina Bara	4	4
(Switzerland) Céline Naef	2	6^{5}
(Thailand) Mananchaya Sawangkaew	6	7^{7}

Qualifying competition
16	(Australia) Arina Rodionova	6	6
(Thailand) Mananchaya Sawangkaew	4	2
