= 2024 US Open – Men's singles qualifying =

Men's singles qualifying
- 2024 US Open

Events
Singles	men	women		boys	girls
Doubles	men	women	mixed	boys	girls
WC Singles	men	women	quad
WC Doubles	men	women	quad
Legends	men	women	mixed

Qualification
Singles	men	women
← 2023 ·	US Open	· 2025 →

The 2024 US Open – Men's singles qualifying is a series of tennis matches that will take place from August 19 to 22, 2024 to determine the sixteen qualifiers into the main draw of the men's singles tournament, and, if necessary, the lucky losers.

This was the last US Open appearance for 2013 semifinalist and former World No. 7 Richard Gasquet. He lost in the second round to Vilius Gaubas.

== Seeds ==
Seedings are based on ATP rankings as of August 12, 2024.

1. (Argentina) Thiago Agustín Tirante (second round)
2. (Germany) Yannick Hanfmann (first round)
3. Aslan Karatsev (qualifying competition)
4. (Bosnia and Herzegovina) Damir Džumhur (first round)
5. (Germany) Maximilian Marterer (qualifying competition, lucky loser)
6. (Netherlands) Jesper de Jong (qualifying competition)
7. (United Kingdom) Billy Harris (qualifying competition)
8. (Bolivia) Hugo Dellien (first round)
9. (Slovakia) Lukáš Klein (first round)
10. (France) Luca Van Assche (second round)
11. (France) Harold Mayot (second round)
12. (Italy) Mattia Bellucci (qualified)
13. (Monaco) Valentin Vacherot (second round, retired)
14. (Slovakia) Jozef Kovalík (first round)
15. (Chile) Cristian Garín (first round)
16. (Switzerland) Leandro Riedi (second round, retired)
17. (France) Quentin Halys (qualified)
18. (France) Térence Atmane (first round)
19. (Kazakhstan) Mikhail Kukushkin (first round)
20. (Chinese Taipei) Tseng Chun-hsin (second round)
21. (China) Bu Yunchaokete (qualified)
22. (Argentina) Román Andrés Burruchaga (second round)
23. (France) Richard Gasquet (second round)
24. (France) Benjamin Bonzi (second round)
25. (Argentina) Facundo Bagnis (first round)
26. (Colombia) Daniel Elahi Galán (second round)
27. (Finland) Otto Virtanen (qualified)
28. (Czech Republic) Vít Kopřiva (first round)
29. (France) Grégoire Barrère (first round)
30. (Croatia) Duje Ajduković (second round)
31. (Switzerland) Alexander Ritschard (first round)
32. (France) Pierre-Hugues Herbert (second round)

== Qualifiers ==
1. (Argentina) Diego Schwartzman
2. (Poland) Maks Kaśnikowski
3. (China) Bu Yunchaokete
4. (Serbia) Hamad Medjedovic
5. (United States) Mitchell Krueger
6. (Australia) Li Tu
7. (Kazakhstan) Timofey Skatov
8. (Canada) Gabriel Diallo
9. (United States) Eliot Spizzirri
10. (Moldova) Radu Albot
11. (Finland) Otto Virtanen
12. (Italy) Mattia Bellucci
13. (United Kingdom) Jan Choinski
14. (France) Kyrian Jacquet
15. (France) Hugo Grenier
16. (France) Quentin Halys

== Lucky loser ==
1. (Germany) Maximilian Marterer

== Qualifying draw ==
=== First qualifier ===
First round
1	(Argentina) Thiago Agustín Tirante	3	6	6
(Kazakhstan) Dmitry Popko	6	1	2
(Argentina) Diego Schwartzman	7	6
(Italy) Andrea Pellegrino	5	3
(Spain) Daniel Rincón	3	2
(Lithuania) Vilius Gaubas	6	6
(United States) Denis Kudla	4	5
23	(France) Richard Gasquet	6	7

Second round
1	(Argentina) Thiago Agustín Tirante	5	4
(Argentina) Diego Schwartzman	7	6
(Lithuania) Vilius Gaubas	6	6
23	(France) Richard Gasquet	2	4

Qualifying competition
(Argentina) Diego Schwartzman	6	6
(Lithuania) Vilius Gaubas	4	4

=== Second qualifier ===
First round
2	(Germany) Yannick Hanfmann	2	1
(Italy) Stefano Napolitano	6	6
(United States) Emilio Nava	2	6	2
(Poland) Maks Kaśnikowski	6	2	6
(France) Antoine Escoffier	2	6	6
(Brazil) Felipe Meligeni Alves	6	2	3
PR	(Argentina) Nicolás Kicker	2	3
24	(France) Benjamin Bonzi	6	6

Second round
(Italy) Stefano Napolitano	5	4
(Poland) Maks Kaśnikowski	7	6
(France) Antoine Escoffier	5	7^{7}	6
24	(France) Benjamin Bonzi	7	6^{4}	1

Qualifying competition
(Poland) Maks Kaśnikowski	6	7^{7}
(France) Antoine Escoffier	3	6^{2}

=== Third qualifier ===
First round
3	Aslan Karatsev	6	6
(France) Enzo Couacaud	3	1
(Australia) Marc Polmans	6	6
(France) Matteo Martineau	1	1
(Croatia) Borna Gojo	6	6
(Dominican Republic) Nick Hardt	3	4
(Japan) Yasutaka Uchiyama	2	6^{4}
21	(China) Bu Yunchaokete	6	7^{7}

Second round
3	Aslan Karatsev	6	6
(Australia) Marc Polmans	0	3
(Croatia) Borna Gojo	4	4
21	(China) Bu Yunchaokete	6	6

Qualifying competition
3	Aslan Karatsev	6	3	4
21	(China) Bu Yunchaokete	1	6	6

=== Fourth qualifier ===
First round
4	(Bosnia and Herzegovina) Damir Džumhur	6	3	3
(Australia) Alex Bolt	0	6	6
WC	(United States) Nishesh Basavareddy	7	6^{2}	6
(France) Ugo Blanchet	5	7^{7}	4
(Spain) Oriol Roca Batalla	6	4	2
(Serbia) Hamad Medjedovic	2	6	6
(Croatia) Dino Prižmić	2	4
30	(Croatia) Duje Ajduković	6	6

Second round
(Australia) Alex Bolt	6^{4}	6^{2}
WC	(United States) Nishesh Basavareddy	7^{7}	7^{7}
(Serbia) Hamad Medjedovic	7^{7}	3	6
30	(Croatia) Duje Ajduković	6^{4}	6	1

Qualifying competition
WC	(United States) Nishesh Basavareddy	4	7^{7}	1
(Serbia) Hamad Medjedovic	6	6^{5}	6

=== Fifth qualifier ===
First round
5	(Germany) Maximilian Marterer	6	6
WC	(United States) Jack Kennedy	3	4
(United States) Patrick Kypson	7^{8}	7^{7}
(Sweden) Elias Ymer	6^{6}	6^{3}
(Jordan) Abdullah Shelbayh	3	6	6
WC	(United States) Brandon Holt	6	3	3
(United States) Mitchell Krueger	6	6
28	(Czech Republic) Vít Kopřiva	3	3

Second round
5	(Germany) Maximilian Marterer	6	7^{7}
(United States) Patrick Kypson	4	6^{5}
(Jordan) Abdullah Shelbayh	6	5	1
(United States) Mitchell Krueger	3	7	6

Qualifying competition
5	(Germany) Maximilian Marterer	4	2
(United States) Mitchell Krueger	6	6

=== Sixth qualifier ===
First round
6	(Netherlands) Jesper de Jong	6	6
(Brazil) Gustavo Heide	3	0
(Kazakhstan) Denis Yevseyev	6	6
(Ecuador) Álvaro Guillén Meza	0	1
(Spain) Alejandro Moro Cañas	4	4
(Australia) Li Tu	6	6
(Argentina) Marco Trungelliti	1	6	7^{10}
19	(Kazakhstan) Mikhail Kukushkin	6	4	6^{6}

Second round
6	(Netherlands) Jesper de Jong	6	6
(Kazakhstan) Denis Yevseyev	3	2
(Australia) Li Tu	7	7
(Argentina) Marco Trungelliti	5	5

Qualifying competition
6	(Netherlands) Jesper de Jong	6	1	5
(Australia) Li Tu	3	6	7

=== Seventh qualifier ===
First round
7	(United Kingdom) Billy Harris	6	2	7
(Argentina) Juan Manuel Cerúndolo	3	6	5
(Bolivia) Murkel Dellien	2	7	6
PR	(Belgium) Kimmer Coppejans	6	5	3
(Switzerland) Marc-Andrea Hüsler	6^{5}	4
(Kazakhstan) Beibit Zhukayev	7^{7}	6
(Kazakhstan) Timofey Skatov	6^{5}	7^{7}	6
25	(Argentina) Facundo Bagnis	7^{7}	6^{4}	1

Second round
7	(United Kingdom) Billy Harris	6	6
(Bolivia) Murkel Dellien	1	3
(Kazakhstan) Beibit Zhukayev	6	6^{5}	1
(Kazakhstan) Timofey Skatov	3	7^{7}	6

Qualifying competition
7	(United Kingdom) Billy Harris	6	0	3
(Kazakhstan) Timofey Skatov	4	6	6

=== Eighth qualifier ===
First round
8	(Bolivia) Hugo Dellien	3	4
(France) Valentin Royer	6	6
WC	(United States) Ethan Quinn	6	6
(France) Maxime Janvier	1	0
(Japan) Sho Shimabukuro	6	5	3
(Canada) Gabriel Diallo	4	7	6
(France) Titouan Droguet	6	7^{9}
18	(France) Térence Atmane	3	6^{7}

Second round
(France) Valentin Royer	6	4	7^{10}
WC	(United States) Ethan Quinn	1	6	6^{6}
(Canada) Gabriel Diallo	3	7	6
(France) Titouan Droguet	6	5	3

Qualifying competition
(France) Valentin Royer	6^{3}	4
(Canada) Gabriel Diallo	7^{7}	6

=== Ninth qualifier ===
First round
9	(Slovakia) Lukáš Klein	6	4	2
(Brazil) João Fonseca	4	6	6
(Italy) Andrea Vavassori	4	6^{4}
(France) Calvin Hemery	6	7^{7}
(United States) Tristan Boyer	4	4
(Belgium) Joris De Loore	6	6
WC	(United States) Eliot Spizzirri	6	6
29	(France) Grégoire Barrère	3	2

Second round
(Brazil) João Fonseca	6	6
(France) Calvin Hemery	4	3
(Belgium) Joris De Loore	5	6^{5}
WC	(United States) Eliot Spizzirri	7	7^{7}

Qualifying competition
(Brazil) João Fonseca	6^{8}	7^{7}	4
WC	(United States) Eliot Spizzirri	7^{10}	6^{5}	6

=== Tenth qualifier ===
First round
10	(France) Luca Van Assche	6	6
PR	(Uruguay) Pablo Cuevas	2	1
(Moldova) Radu Albot	6	5	6
(Spain) Javier Barranco Cosano	1	7	4
(United States) Martin Damm	7^{9}	1	6^{7}
(Japan) Shintaro Mochizuki	6^{7}	6	7^{10}
(Germany) Henri Squire	6^{1}	7^{8}	2
22	(Argentina) Román Andrés Burruchaga	7^{7}	6^{6}	6

Second round
10	(France) Luca Van Assche	2	6	4
(Moldova) Radu Albot	6	0	6
(Japan) Shintaro Mochizuki	6	6
22	(Argentina) Román Andrés Burruchaga	3	2

Qualifying competition
(Moldova) Radu Albot	6	5	6
(Japan) Shintaro Mochizuki	4	7	3

=== Eleventh qualifier ===
First round
11	(France) Harold Mayot	6	6
(Chile) Tomás Barrios Vera	3	2
(Portugal) Jaime Faria	1	4
(France) Lucas Pouille	6	6
(United Kingdom) Jacob Fearnley	1	6^{2}
(United Kingdom) Paul Jubb	6	7^{7}
(United Kingdom) Liam Broady	5	6^{7}
27	(Finland) Otto Virtanen	7	7^{9}

Second round
11	(France) Harold Mayot	2	6	6^{12}
(France) Lucas Pouille	6	1	7^{14}
(United Kingdom) Paul Jubb	3	7^{7}	3
27	(Finland) Otto Virtanen	6	6^{3}	6

Qualifying competition
(France) Lucas Pouille	6^{2}	6	1
27	(Finland) Otto Virtanen	7^{7}	1	6

=== Twelfth qualifier ===
First round
12	(Italy) Mattia Bellucci	6	7
WC	(United States) Aidan Mayo	2	5
(Netherlands) Gijs Brouwer	3	6^{9}
(Argentina) Federico Agustín Gómez	6	7^{11}
(Poland) Kamil Majchrzak	6	6^{5}	7
WC	(United States) Michael Zheng	3	7^{7}	5
(Italy) Matteo Gigante	6^{7}	4
26	(Colombia) Daniel Elahi Galán	7^{9}	6

Second round
12	(Italy) Mattia Bellucci	7	6
(Argentina) Federico Agustín Gómez	5	2
(Poland) Kamil Majchrzak	6	6
26	(Colombia) Daniel Elahi Galán	1	4

Qualifying competition
12	(Italy) Mattia Bellucci	6	6
(Poland) Kamil Majchrzak	3	3

=== Thirteenth qualifier ===
First round
13	(Monaco) Valentin Vacherot	7^{7}	6
WC	(United States) Kaylan Bigun	6^{4}	4
(United Kingdom) Jan Choinski	6	6
(Argentina) Pedro Cachín	4	2
(United States) Maxime Cressy	6	3	6
(Hungary) Zsombor Piros	4	6	3
(Lebanon) Benjamin Hassan	7^{7}	6^{3}	3
32	(France) Pierre-Hugues Herbert	6^{1}	7^{7}	6

Second round
13	(Monaco) Valentin Vacherot	3	1^{r}
(United Kingdom) Jan Choinski	6	3
(United States) Maxime Cressy	6	3	7^{12}
32	(France) Pierre-Hugues Herbert	1	6	6^{10}

Qualifying competition
(United Kingdom) Jan Choinski	6	6^{5}	7^{12}
(United States) Maxime Cressy	0	7^{7}	6^{10}

=== Fourteenth qualifier ===
First round
14	(Slovakia) Jozef Kovalík	4	7^{8}	5
(South Korea) Hong Seong-chan	6	6^{6}	7
(France) Kyrian Jacquet	6	7
PR	(Netherlands) Tim van Rijthoven	2	5
PR	(Serbia) Filip Krajinović	4	2
(Austria) Jurij Rodionov	6	6
(France) Benoît Paire	7^{7}	6^{2}	4
20	(Chinese Taipei) Tseng Chun-hsin	6^{3}	7^{7}	6

Second round
(South Korea) Hong Seong-chan	6	3	5
(France) Kyrian Jacquet	4	6	7
(Austria) Jurij Rodionov	6	7^{7}
20	(Chinese Taipei) Tseng Chun-hsin	4	6^{5}

Qualifying competition
(France) Kyrian Jacquet	7^{8}	6
(Austria) Jurij Rodionov	6^{6}	1

=== Fifteenth qualifier ===
First round
15	(Chile) Cristian Garín	6	6^{4}	3
(Hong Kong) Coleman Wong	4	7^{7}	6
(Germany) Rudolf Molleker	6	4	5
(Chinese Taipei) Hsu Yu-hsiou	4	6	7
(France) Hugo Grenier	6	6
(Peru) Juan Pablo Varillas	0	4
(Italy) Francesco Passaro	5	6	6
31	(Switzerland) Alexander Ritschard	7	3	3

Second round
(Hong Kong) Coleman Wong	6	2	6^{8}
(Chinese Taipei) Hsu Yu-hsiou	1	6	7^{10}
(France) Hugo Grenier	6	6
(Italy) Francesco Passaro	2	0

Qualifying competition
(Chinese Taipei) Hsu Yu-hsiou	4	6^{5}
(France) Hugo Grenier	6	7^{7}

=== Sixteenth qualifier ===
First round
16	(Switzerland) Leandro Riedi	6	6
(United States) Nicolas Moreno de Alboran	1	3
(Switzerland) Jérôme Kym	6	6
WC	(United States) Bruno Kuzuhara	1	2
(United States) J. J. Wolf	6	6
(United Kingdom) Oliver Crawford	4	4
(Portugal) Henrique Rocha	7^{7}	1	6^{4}
17	(France) Quentin Halys	6^{2}	6	7^{10}

Second round
16	(Switzerland) Leandro Riedi	3	0^{r}
(Switzerland) Jérôme Kym	6	1
(United States) J. J. Wolf	3	6^{4}
17	(France) Quentin Halys	6	7^{7}

Qualifying competition
(Switzerland) Jérôme Kym	6^{4}	6	6^{7}
17	(France) Quentin Halys	7^{7}	2	7^{10}
