= Luca Preda =

Romanian tennis player (born 2006)

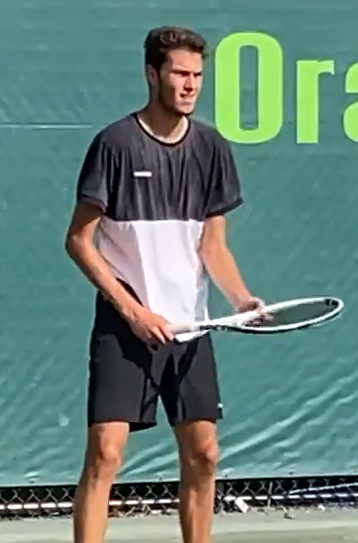
- Preda at the 2023 Orange Bowl
- Country (sports): Romania
- Born: 19 March 2006 (age 19) Constanța, Romania
- Height: 2.01 m (6 ft 7 in)
- Plays: Right-handed (two-handed backhand)
- Coach: Uladzimir Ignatik
- Prize money: US $20,585

Singles
- Career record: 0–1
- Highest ranking: No. 748 (27 October 2025)
- Current ranking: No. 766 (19 January 2026)

Doubles
- Career record: 1–1
- Highest ranking: No. 861 (19 May 2025)
- Current ranking: No. 900 (27 October 2025)
- Last updated on: 27 January 2026.

Luca Preda (born 19 March 2006) is a Romanian professional tennis player. He has a career-high ATP singles ranking of world No. 748 achieved on 27 October 2025 and a doubles ranking of No. 861 achieved on 19 May 2025.

== Early life ==
Preda was born in Constanța. His mother is a former basketball player. He began playing tennis at the age of four and trained at Tennis Club Play Constanţa. He also played basketball at Athletic Constanţa.

== Junior career ==
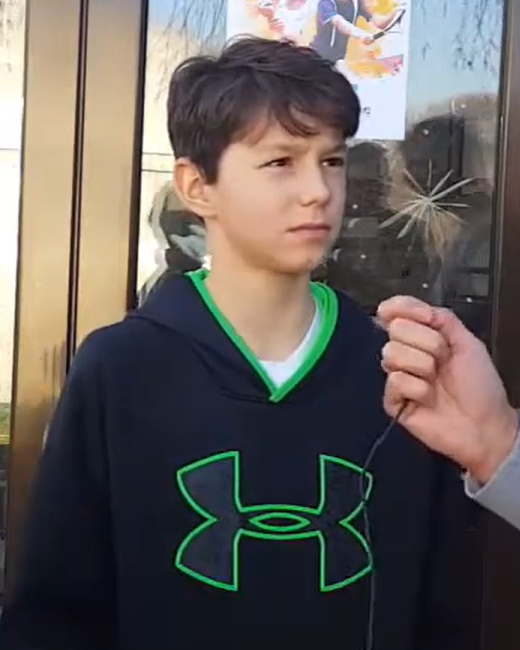
Preda in 2018

In June 2023, Preda won his first J300 title at the ITF German Juniors in Bamberg, defeating Lasse Pörtner in the final. That December, he reached the final of the J500 Orange Bowl, but lost to Danil Panarin.

In February 2024, he won his first J500 title in Cairo. He was the first Romanian player to win a J500 tournament since Ana Bogdan in 2008. In April, he also reached the final of the J500 event in Offenbach, but retired in the first set against Maxim Mrva. He made his Junior Grand Slam debut at the French Open in June, reaching the second round in singles and quarterfinals in doubles. At the US Open in September, he reached the quarterfinals in singles and semifinals in doubles. Later that month, he won the J300 U18 European Junior Championships in Oberpullendorf in both singles and doubles. In October, he qualified for the ITF Junior Masters in Chengdu, where he reached the semifinals.

== Professional career ==
In March 2025, Preda made his ATP Tour debut as a wildcard into the doubles main draw of the Țiriac Open, partnering compatriot Marius Copil. He won his first ATP doubles match over Karol Drzewiecki and Piotr Matuszewski.
