= 2024 US Open – Boys' singles =

Boys' singles
- 2024 US Open

Final
- Champion: (Spain) Rafael Jódar
- Runner-up: (Norway) Nicolai Budkov Kjær
- Score: 2–6, 6–2, 7–6^{(10–1)}

Events
Singles	men	women		boys	girls
Doubles	men	women	mixed	boys	girls
WC Singles	men	women	quad	boys	girls
WC Doubles	men	women	quad	boys	girls
- US Open

Rafael Jódar defeated Nicolai Budkov Kjær in the final, 2–6, 6–2, 7–6^{(10–1)}, to win the boys' singles title at the 2024 US Open. Jódar was the third Spanish player in four years to win the boys' singles title, after Daniel Rincón in 2021 and Martín Landaluce in 2022.

João Fonseca was the reigning champion, but chose to compete only in the Men's singles qualifying event, where he lost to Eliot Spizzirri in the qualifying competition.

== Seeds ==
1. (Norway) Nicolai Budkov Kjær (final)
2. (United States) Kaylan Bigun (quarterfinals)
3. (Japan) Rei Sakamoto (semifinals)
4. (Netherlands) Mees Röttgering (third round)
5. (Romania) Luca Preda (quarterfinals)
6. (Czech Republic) Maxim Mrva (first round)
7. (Australia) Hayden Jones (first round)
8. (France) Théo Papamalamis (third round)
9. (United States) Jagger Leach (second round)
10. (Kazakhstan) Amir Omarkhanov (first round)
11. (South Korea) Kim Jang-jun (third round)
12. (Spain) Rafael Jódar (champion)
13. (United States) Cooper Woestendick (second round)
14. (Germany) Max Schönhaus (second round)
15. (Colombia) Miguel Tobón (first round)
16. (Serbia) Marko Maksimović (first round)

Click on the seed number of a player to go to their draw section.

== Draw ==
Key

- Q = Qualifier
- WC = Wild card
- LL = Lucky loser
- Alt = Alternate
- ITF = ITF entry
- PR = Protected ranking
- SR = Special ranking
- SE = Special exempt
- JE = Junior exempt
- JR = Junior Accelerator Programme entrant
- CO = College Accelerator Programme entrant
- NG = Next Gen Accelerator Program entrant
- w/o = Walkover
- r = Retired
- d = Defaulted

=== Finals ===
Quarterfinals
1	(Norway) Nicolai Budkov Kjær	6	1	7
5	(Romania) Luca Preda	3	6	5
Q	(Switzerland) Flynn Thomas	1	2
(United Kingdom) Charlie Robertson	6	6
(Turkey) Atakan Karahan	3	3
3	(Japan) Rei Sakamoto	6	6
12	(Spain) Rafael Jódar	6	6^{7}	7
2	(United States) Kaylan Bigun	4	7^{9}	5

Semifinals
1	(Norway) Nicolai Budkov Kjær	6	6
(United Kingdom) Charlie Robertson	3	3
3	(Japan) Rei Sakamoto	3	1
12	(Spain) Rafael Jódar	6	6

Final
1	(Norway) Nicolai Budkov Kjær	6	2	6^{1}
12	(Spain) Rafael Jódar	2	6	7^{10}

=== Top half ===
==== Section 1 ====
First round
1	(Norway) Nicolai Budkov Kjær	7^{7}	7
Q	(United States) Keaton Hance	6^{5}	5
WC	(United States) Matisse Farzam	3	2
SE	(Italy) Lorenzo Angelini	6	6
(Japan) Naoya Honda	6	6
(Brazil) Gustavo Ribeiro de Almeida	4	2
LL	(United States) Stiles Brockett	3	2
14	(Germany) Max Schönhaus	6	6
9	(United States) Jagger Leach	6	6
Q	(Czech Republic) Denis Peták	3	4
(France) Thomas Faurel	6	6
Daniil Sarksian	3	1
WC	(United States) Kase Schinnerer	6	3
(Morocco) Reda Bennani	3	0^{r}
(United Kingdom) Oliver Bonding	6	2	3
5	(Romania) Luca Preda	1	6	6

Second round
1	(Norway) N Budkov Kjær	6	3	6
SE	(Italy) L Angelini	1	6	4
(Japan) N Honda	6	7^{7}
14	(Germany) M Schönhaus	2	6^{1}
9	(United States) J Leach	3	6	3
(France) T Faurel	6	4	6
WC	(United States) K Schinnerer	1	3
5	(Romania) L Preda	6	6

Third round
1	(Norway) N Budkov Kjær	6	6
(Japan) N Honda	3	3
(France) T Faurel	0	5
5	(Romania) L Preda	6	7

Quarterfinals
1	(Norway) N Budkov Kjær	6	1	7
5	(Romania) L Preda	3	6	5

==== Section 2 ====
First round
4	(Netherlands) Mees Röttgering	6	6
(United States) Jack Kennedy	4	1
Q	(United States) Jack Secord	4	1
(Finland) Oskari Paldanius	6	6
Q	(Switzerland) Flynn Thomas	7^{7}	6
Q	(Kazakhstan) Danial Rakhmatullayev	6^{4}	2
(United States) Noah Johnston	3	6	6
16	(Serbia) Marko Maksimović	6	3	2
11	(South Korea) Kim Jang-jun	6	6
Ivan Iutkin	1	4
WC	(United States) Gus Grumet	3	4
SE	(Italy) Alessandro Battiston	6	6
(United Kingdom) Charlie Robertson	7	6
(Spain) Andrés Santamarta Roig	5	2
(United States) Alexander Razeghi	6	6
6	(Czech Republic) Maxim Mrva	2	2

Second round
4	(Netherlands) M Röttgering	6	7^{7}
(Finland) O Paldanius	2	6^{4}
Q	(Switzerland) F Thomas	6	3	6
(United States) N Johnston	2	6	3
11	(South Korea) J-j Kim	7^{7}	6
SE	(Italy) A Battiston	6^{2}	2
(United Kingdom) C Robertson	7^{9}	6
(United States) A Razeghi	6^{7}	3

Third round
4	(Netherlands) M Röttgering	6	4	0
Q	(Switzerland) F Thomas	4	6	6
11	(South Korea) J-j Kim	3	4
(United Kingdom) C Robertson	6	6

Quarterfinals
Q	(Switzerland) F Thomas	1	2
(United Kingdom) C Robertson	6	6

=== Bottom half ===
==== Section 3 ====
First round
8	(France) Théo Papamalamis	6	5	6
WC	(United States) Benjamin Willwerth	4	7	4
(Italy) Andrea De Marchi	3	4
(South Korea) Roh Ho-young	6	6
(Turkey) Atakan Karahan	6	2	7^{10}
(United States) Maxwell Exsted	2	6	6^{6}
Q	(Brazil) Luís Miguel	7^{7}	6
10	(Kazakhstan) Amir Omarkhanov	6^{3}	3
13	(United States) Cooper Woestendick	6	6
(Sweden) William Rejchtman Vinciguerra	0	2
Timofei Derepasko	6	6
(Argentina) Máximo Zeitune	4	2
WC	(United States) Nikita Samuel Filin	6^{3}	4
(Switzerland) Henry Bernet	7^{7}	6
(Spain) Izan Almazán Valiente	3	1
3	(Japan) Rei Sakamoto	6	6

Second round
8	(France) T Papamalamis	6	5	6
(South Korea) H-y Roh	3	7	2
(Turkey) A Karahan	6	4	6
Q	(Brazil) L Miguel	2	6	3
13	(United States) C Woestendick	6^{5}	3
T Derepasko	7^{7}	6
(Switzerland) H Bernet	6^{2}	4
3	(Japan) R Sakamoto	7^{7}	6

Third round
8	(France) T Papamalamis	4	6^{11}
(Turkey) A Karahan	6	7^{13}
T Derepasko	4	4
3	(Japan) R Sakamoto	6	6

Quarterfinals
(Turkey) A Karahan	3	3
3	(Japan) R Sakamoto	6	6

==== Section 4 ====
First round
7	(Australia) Hayden Jones	3	6^{8}
WC	(United States) Dominick Mosejczuk	6	7^{10}
(Czech Republic) Petr Brunclík	6	6
(China) Zhang Tianhui	4	2
(United Kingdom) Viktor Frydrych	5	1
WC	(United States) Rudy Quan	7	6
(United States) Ian Mayew	2	6^{3}
12	(Spain) Rafael Jódar	6	7^{7}
15	(Colombia) Miguel Tobón	6^{5}	5
(France) Nathan Trouvé	7^{7}	7
Q	(Germany) Mika Petkovic	4	6	3
WC	(United States) Matthew Forbes	6	4	6
LL	(Morocco) Karim Bennani	7	6
Q	(Italy) Jacopo Vasamì	5	3
(Cyprus) Andreas Timini	4	2
2	(United States) Kaylan Bigun	6	6

Second round
WC	(United States) D Mosejczuk	6	6
(Czech Republic) P Brunclík	3	4
WC	(United States) R Quan	6	4	3
12	(Spain) R Jódar	3	6	6
(France) N Trouvé	4	4
WC	(United States) M Forbes	6	6
LL	(Morocco) K Bennani	2	2
2	(United States) K Bigun	6	6

Third round
WC	(United States) D Mosejczuk	2	1
12	(Spain) R Jódar	6	6
WC	(United States) M Forbes	2	4
2	(United States) K Bigun	6	6

Quarterfinals
12	(Spain) R Jódar	6	6^{7}	7
2	(United States) K Bigun	4	7^{9}	5

== Qualifying ==
=== Seeds ===
1. (Spain) Bryan Hernández Cortés (first round)
2. (Czech Republic) Jan Klimas (first round)
3. (Switzerland) Flynn Thomas (qualified)
4. (Germany) Niels McDonald (first round, retired)
5. (Italy) Lorenzo Beraldo (first round)
6. (Czech Republic) Vojtěch Valeš (first round)
7. (Brazil) Enzo Kohlmann de Freitas (first round)
8. (Morocco) Karim Bennani (qualifying competition, lucky loser)
9. (Italy) Jacopo Vasamì (qualified)
10. (Germany) Mika Petkovic (qualified)
11. (Czech Republic) Denis Peták (qualified)
12. (Kazakhstan) Danial Rakhmatullayev (qualified)
13. (Sweden) Ludvig Fredrik Hede (first round)
14. (Brazil) Luís Miguel (qualified)
15. (Germany) Max Stenzer (first round, retired)
16. (Singapore) Bill Chan (first round)

=== Qualifiers ===
1. (Italy) Jacopo Vasamì
2. (United States) Jack Secord
3. (Switzerland) Flynn Thomas
4. (United States) Keaton Hance
5. (Czech Republic) Denis Peták
6. (Brazil) Luís Miguel
7. (Germany) Mika Petkovic
8. (Kazakhstan) Danial Rakhmatullayev

=== Lucky losers ===
1. (Morocco) Karim Bennani
2. (United States) Stiles Brockett

=== Draw ===
==== First qualifier ====
First round
1	(Spain) Bryan Hernández Cortés	6	4	[9]
WC	(United States) Ryan Cozad	3	6	[11]
(Japan) Kosuke Asada	4	4
9	(Italy) Jacopo Vasamì	6	6

Qualifying competition
WC	(United States) Ryan Cozad	2	2
9	(Italy) Jacopo Vasamì	6	6

==== Second qualifier ====
First round
2	(Czech Republic) Jan Klimas	4	0
(United States) Jack Secord	6	6
(United States) Jordan Reznik	6	1
15	(Germany) Max Stenzer	1	0^{r}

Qualifying competition
(United States) Jack Secord	7^{7}	6
(United States) Jordan Reznik	6^{4}	3

==== Third qualifier ====
First round
3	(Switzerland) Flynn Thomas	6	4	[10]
(Australia) Hugh Winter	2	6	[7]
WC	(United States) Krish Arora	6	6
13	(Sweden) Ludvig Fredrik Hede	3	2

Qualifying competition
3	(Switzerland) Flynn Thomas	6	6
WC	(United States) Krish Arora	2	4

==== Fourth qualifier ====
First round
4	(Germany) Niels McDonald	0^{r}
(India) Rethin Pranav Senthil Kumar	3
WC	(United States) Keaton Hance	6	6
16	(Singapore) Bill Chan	3	2

Qualifying competition
(India) Rethin Pranav Senthil Kumar	5	2
WC	(United States) Keaton Hance	7	6

==== Fifth qualifier ====
First round
5	(Italy) Lorenzo Beraldo	6	0	[8]
(United States) Ronit Karki	1	6	[10]
(Iran) Kasra Rahmani	3	6^{3}
11	(Czech Republic) Denis Peták	6	7^{7}

Qualifying competition
(United States) Ronit Karki	0	4
11	(Czech Republic) Denis Peták	6	6

==== Sixth qualifier ====
First round
6	(Czech Republic) Vojtěch Valeš	4	7^{7}	[7]
(United States) Stiles Brockett	6	6^{4}	[10]
(Germany) Tom Sickenberger	1	6	[7]
14	(Brazil) Luís Miguel	6	4	[10]

Qualifying competition
(United States) Stiles Brockett	4	6	[8]
14	(Brazil) Luís Miguel	6	4	[10]

==== Seventh qualifier ====
First round
7	(Brazil) Enzo Kohlmann de Freitas	3	2
(Nicaragua) Joaquín Guilleme	6	6
(United States) Maximus Dussault	3	3
10	(Germany) Mika Petkovic	6	6

Qualifying competition
(Nicaragua) Joaquín Guilleme	7^{7}	0	[6]
10	(Germany) Mika Petkovic	6^{2}	6	[10]

==== Eighth qualifier ====
First round
8	(Morocco) Karim Bennani	4	6	[10]
(Guatemala) Rafael Botrán Neutze	6	4	[3]
WC	(United States) Rohan Belday	4	6	[8]
12	(Kazakhstan) Danial Rakhmatullayev	6	4	[10]

Qualifying competition
8	(Morocco) Karim Bennani	6^{4}	6	[4]
12	(Kazakhstan) Danial Rakhmatullayev	7^{7}	4	[10]
