= 2024 US Open – Wheelchair boys' singles =

Tennis championship

Wheelchair boys' singles
- 2024 US Open

Final
- Champion: (United States) Charlie Cooper
- Runner-up: (Netherlands) Ivar van Rijt
- Score: 7–6^{(7–2)}, 6–3

Details
- Draw: 8
- Seeds: 2

Events
Singles	men	women		boys	girls
Doubles	men	women	mixed	boys	girls
WC Singles	men	women	quad	boys	girls
WC Doubles	men	women	quad	boys	girls
- US Open

Charlie Cooper won the boys' junior wheelchair singles title at the 2024 US Open, defeating Ivar van Rijt in the final.

== Seeds ==
1. (Austria) Maximilian Taucher (semifinals)
2. (Netherlands) Ivar van Rijt (final)

== Draw ==
Key

- Q = Qualifier
- WC = Wild card
- LL = Lucky loser
- Alt = Alternate
- ITF = ITF entry
- PR = Protected ranking
- SR = Special ranking
- SE = Special exempt
- JE = Junior exempt
- JR = Junior Accelerator Programme entrant
- CO = College Accelerator Programme entrant
- NG = Next Gen Accelerator Program entrant
- w/o = Walkover
- r = Retired
- d = Defaulted

=== Draw ===
Quarterfinals
1	(Austria) Maximilian Taucher	2	6	6
(Australia) Benjamin Wenzel	6	3	2
(United Kingdom) Ruben Harris	7^{9}	4	2
(United States) Charlie Cooper	6^{7}	6	6
(Australia) Jin Woodman	3	6	6
(Australia) Yassin Hill	6	4	3
(United States) Tomas Majetic	5	7	4
2	(Netherlands) Ivar van Rijt	7	5	6

Semifinals
1	(Austria) Maximilian Taucher	3	2
(United States) Charlie Cooper	6	6
(Australia) Jin Woodman	4	6	2
2	(Netherlands) Ivar van Rijt	6	2	6

Final
(United States) Charlie Cooper	7^{7}	6
2	(Netherlands) Ivar van Rijt	6^{2}	3
