= 2024 US Open – Boys' doubles =

Boys' doubles
- 2024 US Open

Final
- Champions: (Czech Republic) Maxim Mrva (Japan) Rei Sakamoto
- Runners-up: (Czech Republic) Denis Peták (Switzerland) Flynn Thomas
- Score: 7–5, 7–6^{(7–1)}

Events
Singles	men	women		boys	girls
Doubles	men	women	mixed	boys	girls
WC Singles	men	women	quad	boys	girls
WC Doubles	men	women	quad	boys	girls
- US Open

Maxim Mrva and Rei Sakamoto won the boys' doubles title at the 2024 US Open, defeating Denis Peták and Flynn Thomas in the final, 7–5, 7–6^{(7–1)}.

Max Dahlin and Oliver Ojakäär were the reigning champions, but were no longer eligible to participate in junior events.

== Seeds ==
1. (Czech Republic) Maxim Mrva / (Japan) Rei Sakamoto (champions)
2. (Australia) Hayden Jones / (United States) Jagger Leach (first round)
3. (Switzerland) Henry Bernet / (Norway) Nicolai Budkov Kjær (semifinals)
4. (France) Thomas Faurel / (Romania) Luca Preda (semifinals)
5. (Czech Republic) Petr Brunclík / (France) Théo Papamalamis (second round)
6. (South Korea) Kim Jang-jun / (Serbia) Marko Maksimović (first round)
7. (United States) Alexander Razeghi / (Germany) Max Schönhaus (quarterfinals)
8. (United States) Maxwell Exsted / (United States) Cooper Woestendick (first round)

== Draw ==
Key

- Q = Qualifier
- WC = Wild card
- LL = Lucky loser
- Alt = Alternate
- ITF = ITF entry
- PR = Protected ranking
- SR = Special ranking
- SE = Special exempt
- JE = Junior exempt
- JR = Junior Accelerator Programme entrant
- CO = College Accelerator Programme entrant
- NG = Next Gen Accelerator Program entrant
- w/o = Walkover
- r = Retired
- d = Defaulted

=== Finals ===
Semifinals
1	(Czech Republic) Maxim Mrva (Japan) Rei Sakamoto	7	6
3	(Switzerland) Henry Bernet (Norway) Nicolai Budkov Kjær	5	3
4	(France) Thomas Faurel (Romania) Luca Preda	3	5
(Czech Republic) Denis Peták (Switzerland) Flynn Thomas	6	7

Final
1	(Czech Republic) Maxim Mrva (Japan) Rei Sakamoto	7	7^{7}
(Czech Republic) Denis Peták (Switzerland) Flynn Thomas	5	6^{1}

=== Top half ===
First round
1	(Czech Republic) Maxim Mrva (Japan) Rei Sakamoto	6	6
(Finland) Oskari Paldanius (Cyprus) Andreas Timini	2	2
WC	(United States) Stiles Brockett (United States) Dominick Mosejczuk	4	7	[9]
(Spain) Rafael Jódar (Spain) Andrés Santamarta Roig	6	5	[11]
WC	(United States) Matisse Farzam (United States) Nikita Samuel Filin	4	7	[10]
(Spain) Izan Almazán Valiente (Brazil) Gustavo Ribeiro de Almeida	6	5	[1]
Ivan Iutkin (Sweden) William Rejchtman Vinciguerra	2	4
5	(Czech Republic) Petr Brunclík (France) Théo Papamalamis	6	6
3	(Switzerland) Henry Bernet (Norway) Nicolai Budkov Kjær	6^{5}	6	[10]
(United States) Keaton Hance (United States) Jack Kennedy	7^{7}	1	[7]
Alt	(Brazil) Enzo Kohlmann de Freitas (Brazil) Luís Miguel	2	6^{3}
(Italy) Andrea De Marchi (Italy) Jacopo Vasamì	6	7^{7}
Daniil Sarksian (China) Zhang Tianhui	6	6^{7}	[10]
(United States) Noah Johnston (United States) Benjamin Willwerth	2	7^{9}	[7]
(Japan) Naoya Honda (France) Nathan Trouvé	7	4	[10]
6	(South Korea) Kim Jang-jun (Serbia) Marko Maksimović	5	6	[4]

Second round
1	(Czech Republic) M Mrva (Japan) R Sakamoto	7	6
(Spain) R Jódar (Spain) A Santamarta Roig	5	3
WC	(United States) M Farzam (United States) NS Filin	7	6
5	(Czech Republic) P Brunclík (France) T Papamalamis	5	2
3	(Switzerland) H Bernet (Norway) N Budkov Kjær	6	6
(Italy) A De Marchi (Italy) J Vasamì	2	2
D Sarksian (China) T Zhang	6	6^{5}	[5]
(Japan) N Honda (France) N Trouvé	4	7^{7}	[10]

Quarterfinals
1	(Czech Republic) M Mrva (Japan) R Sakamoto	5	6	[13]
WC	(United States) M Farzam (United States) NS Filin	7	4	[11]
3	(Switzerland) H Bernet (Norway) N Budkov Kjær	4	6	[16]
(Japan) N Honda (France) N Trouvé	6	3	[14]

Semifinals
1	(Czech Republic) M Mrva (Japan) R Sakamoto	7	6
3	(Switzerland) H Bernet (Norway) N Budkov Kjær	5	3

=== Bottom half ===
First round
7	(United States) Alexander Razeghi (Germany) Max Schönhaus	6	6
(Colombia) Miguel Tobón (Argentina) Máximo Zeitune	3	2
(United States) Ian Mayew (United States) Kase Schinnerer	4	6	[10]
(United Kingdom) Oliver Bonding (United Kingdom) Charlie Robertson	6	4	[8]
(Italy) Alessandro Battiston (Spain) Bryan Hernández Cortés	6	3	[10]
(Czech Republic) Jan Klimas (Germany) Mika Petkovic	3	6	[5]
WC	(United States) Krish Arora (United States) Matthew Forbes	5	4
4	(France) Thomas Faurel (Romania) Luca Preda	7	6
8	(United States) Maxwell Exsted (United States) Cooper Woestendick	6^{4}	1
(Czech Republic) Denis Peták (Switzerland) Flynn Thomas	7^{7}	6
Timofei Derepasko (Kazakhstan) Amir Omarkhanov	6	3	[10]
(Turkey) Atakan Karahan (South Korea) Roh Ho-young	3	6	[8]
WC	(Puerto Rico) Yannik Álvarez (United States) Ryan Cozad	4	1
(United Kingdom) Viktor Frydrych (Netherlands) Mees Röttgering	6	6
(Italy) Lorenzo Angelini (Italy) Lorenzo Beraldo	7^{7}	7^{7}
2	(Australia) Hayden Jones (United States) Jagger Leach	6^{5}	6^{2}

Second round
7	(United States) A Razeghi (Germany) M Schönhaus	6	6
(United States) I Mayew (United States) K Schinnerer	3	2
(Italy) A Battiston (Spain) B Hernández Cortés	6	4	[6]
4	(France) T Faurel (Romania) L Preda	3	6	[10]
(Czech Republic) D Peták (Switzerland) F Thomas	5	7	[12]
T Derepasko (Kazakhstan) A Omarkhanov	7	5	[10]
(United Kingdom) V Frydrych (Netherlands) M Röttgering	7^{7}	4	[10]
(Italy) L Angelini (Italy) L Beraldo	6^{3}	6	[6]

Quarterfinals
7	(United States) A Razeghi (Germany) M Schönhaus	6	5	[5]
4	(France) T Faurel (Romania) L Preda	1	7	[10]
(Czech Republic) D Peták (Switzerland) F Thomas	6	6
(United Kingdom) V Frydrych (Netherlands) M Röttgering	4	4

Semifinals
4	(France) T Faurel (Romania) L Preda	3	5
(Czech Republic) D Peták (Switzerland) F Thomas	6	7
