= 2024 US Open – Wheelchair girls' doubles =

Tennis championship

Wheelchair girls' doubles
- 2024 US Open

Final
- Champion: (Japan) Rio Okano (Japan) Yuma Takamuro
- Runner-up: (Belgium) Luna Gryp (Brazil) Vitória Miranda
- Score: 6–3, 6–2

Details
- Draw: 4
- Seeds: 2

Events
Singles	men	women		boys	girls
Doubles	men	women	mixed	boys	girls
WC Singles	men	women	quad	boys	girls
WC Doubles	men	women	quad	boys	girls
- US Open

No. 2 seeds Rio Okano and Yuma Takamuro, both of Japan, defeated No. 1 seeds Luna Gryp of Belgium and Vitória Miranda of Brazil, 6–3, 6–2, in the girls' doubles title match 2024 US Open.

== Seeds ==
1. (Belgium) Luna Gryp / (Brazil) Vitória Miranda (final)
2. (Japan) Rio Okano / (Japan) Yuma Takamuro (champions)

== Draw ==
Key

- Q = Qualifier
- WC = Wild card
- LL = Lucky loser
- Alt = Alternate
- ITF = ITF entry
- PR = Protected ranking
- SR = Special ranking
- SE = Special exempt
- JE = Junior exempt
- JR = Junior Accelerator Programme entrant
- CO = College Accelerator Programme entrant
- NG = Next Gen Accelerator Program entrant
- w/o = Walkover
- r = Retired
- d = Defaulted

=== Finals ===
Semifinals
1	(Belgium) Luna Gryp (Brazil) Vitória Miranda	6	6
(Canada) Frederique Berube Perron (United States) Sabina Czauz	4	4
(Australia) Isla Gillespie (Latvia) Ailina Mosko	1	1
2	(Japan) Rio Okano (Japan) Yuma Takamuro	6	6

Final
1	(Belgium) Luna Gryp (Brazil) Vitória Miranda	3	2
2	(Japan) Rio Okano (Japan) Yuma Takamuro	6	6
