= 2024 US Open – Wheelchair girls' singles =

Tennis championship

Wheelchair girls' singles
- 2024 US Open

Final
- Champion: (Japan) Yuma Takamuro
- Runner-up: (Brazil) Vitória Miranda
- Score: 2–6, 6–4, 6-4

Details
- Draw: 8
- Seeds: 2

Events
Singles	men	women		boys	girls
Doubles	men	women	mixed	boys	girls
WC Singles	men	women	quad	boys	girls
WC Doubles	men	women	quad	boys	girls
- US Open

Yuma Takamuro won the girls' junior wheelchair singles title at the 2024 US Open, defeating top seed Vitória Miranda in the final.

== Seeds ==
1. (Brazil) Vitória Miranda (final)
2. (Japan) Yuma Takamuro (champion)

== Draw ==
Key

- Q = Qualifier
- WC = Wild card
- LL = Lucky loser
- Alt = Alternate
- ITF = ITF entry
- PR = Protected ranking
- SR = Special ranking
- SE = Special exempt
- JE = Junior exempt
- JR = Junior Accelerator Programme entrant
- CO = College Accelerator Programme entrant
- NG = Next Gen Accelerator Program entrant
- w/o = Walkover
- r = Retired
- d = Defaulted

=== Draw ===
Quarterfinals
1	(Brazil) Vitória Miranda	6	6
(Latvia) Ailina Mosko	1	0
(Japan) Rio Okano	6	1	6^{5}
(Belgium) Luna Gryp	1	6	7^{7}
(Australia) Isla Gillespie	3	2
(Canada) Frederique Berube Perron	6	6
(United States) Sabina Czauz	2	4
2	(Japan) Yuma Takamuro	6	6

Semifinals
1	(Brazil) Vitória Miranda	6	6
(United States) Sabina Czauz	3	4
(Canada) Frederique Berube Perron	1	3
2	(Japan) Yuma Takamuro	6	6

Final
1	(Brazil) Vitória Miranda	6	4	4
2	(Japan) Yuma Takamuro	2	6	6
