= 2024 US Open – Wheelchair boys' doubles =

Tennis championship

Wheelchair boys' doubles
- 2024 US Open

Final
- Champions: (Netherlands) Ivar van Rijt (Australia) Benjamin Wenzel
- Runners-up: (United States) Charlie Cooper (United States) Tomas Majetic
- Score: 6–2, 6–1

Details
- Draw: 4
- Seeds: 2

Events
| Singles | men | women | | boys | girls |
| Doubles | men | women | mixed | boys | girls |
| WC Singles | men | women | quad | boys | girls |
| WC Doubles | men | women | quad | boys | girls |
- US Open

Ivar van Rijt and Benjamin Wenzel won the Wheelchair Boys' doubles title at the 2024 US Open, defeating American duo Charlie Cooper and Tomas Majetic in the final.

== Seeds ==
1. (United Kingdom) Ruben Harris / (Austria) Maximilian Taucher (semifinals)
2. (Netherlands) Ivar van Rijt / (Australia) Benjamin Wenzel (champions)

== Draw ==
Key

- Q = Qualifier
- WC = Wild card
- LL = Lucky loser
- Alt = Alternate
- ITF = ITF entry
- PR = Protected ranking
- SR = Special ranking
- SE = Special exempt
- JE = Junior exempt
- JR = Junior Accelerator Programme entrant
- CO = College Accelerator Programme entrant
- NG = Next Gen Accelerator Program entrant
- w/o = Walkover
- r = Retired
- d = Defaulted

=== Finals ===
Semifinals
1 | (United Kingdom) Ruben Harris (Austria) Maximilian Taucher | 1 | 4
(United States) Charlie Cooper (United States) Tomas Majetic | 6 | 6
(Australia) Yassin Hill (Australia) Jin Woodman | 2 | 2
2 | (Netherlands) Ivar van Rijt (Australia) Benjamin Wenzel | 6 | 6

Final
(United States) Charlie Cooper (United States) Tomas Majetic | 2 | 1
2 | (Netherlands) Ivar van Rijt (Australia) Benjamin Wenzel | 6 | 6
