= Alexander Razeghi =

American tennis player (born 2006)

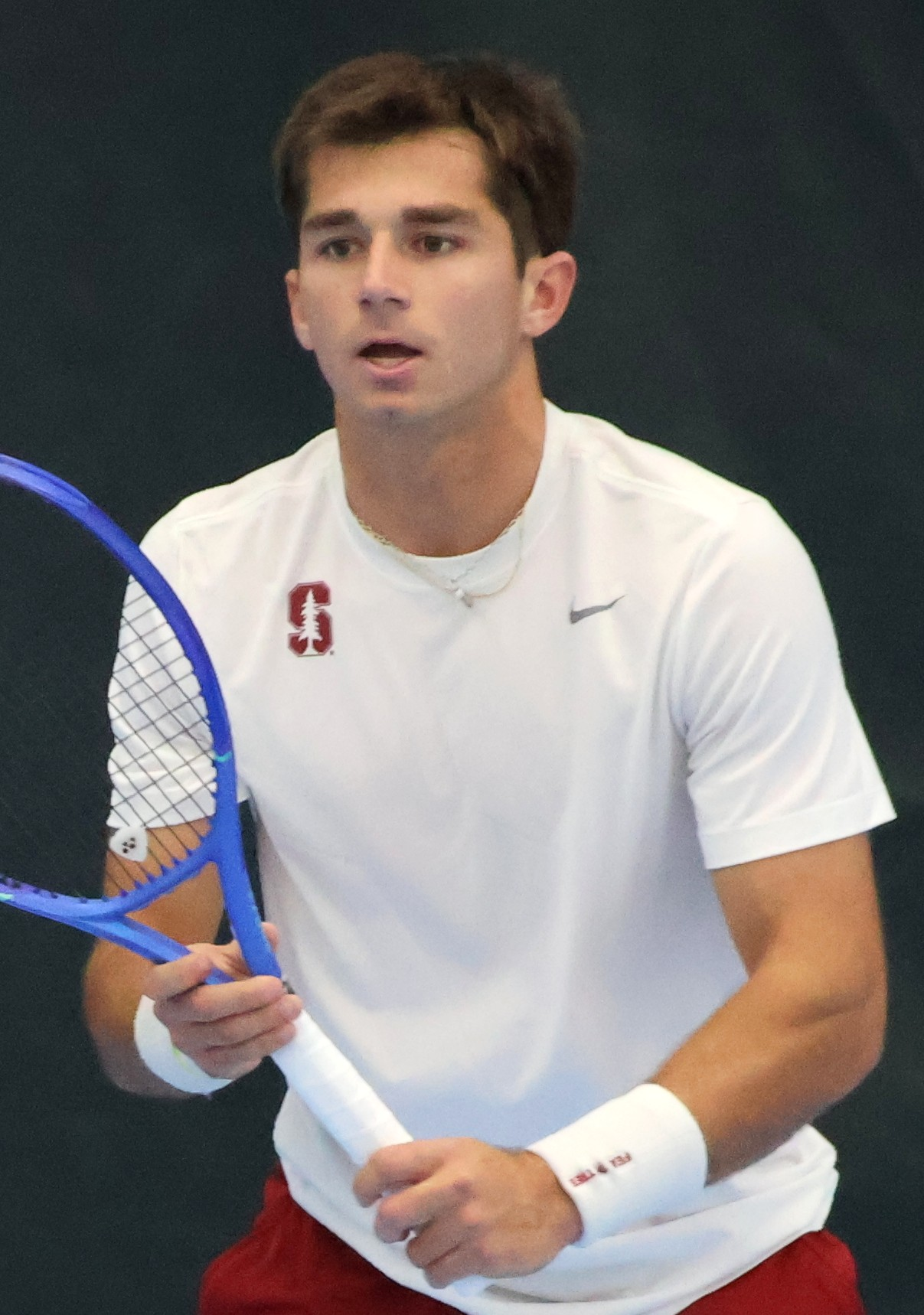
- Razeghi with Stanford in 2026
- Country (sports): United States
- Born: May 10, 2006 (age 20) Houston, Texas, US
- Height: 1.78 m (5 ft 10 in)
- Plays: Left-handed (two-handed backhand)
- College: Stanford (2024–)
- Coach: Paul Goldstein
- Prize money: US $18,004

Singles
- Career record: 0–0 (at ATP Tour level, Grand Slam level, and in Davis Cup)
- Highest ranking: No. 1,217 (November 27, 2023)
- Current ranking: No. 1,561 (April 13, 2026)

Doubles
- Career record: 0–1 (at ATP Tour level, Grand Slam level, and in Davis Cup)
- Highest ranking: No. 1,108 (April 13, 2026)
- Current ranking: No. 1,108 (April 13, 2026)

Grand Slam doubles results
- US Open: 1R (2024)
- Last updated on: April 13, 2026.

Alexander Razeghi (born May 10, 2006) is an American tennis player. He has a career-high ATP singles ranking of No. 1,217 achieved on November 27, 2023 and a doubles ranking of No. 1,108, achieved on April 13, 2026.

Razeghi won the boys' doubles title at the 2024 Wimbledon Championships.

== Early life ==
Razeghi hails from Humble, Texas. When he was twelve years-old he moved to train at the Giammalva Elite Tennis Acadeny, ran by former-pro Sammy Giammalva Jr. in Houston, Texas.

== Junior career ==
Razeghi reached the semi-finals of the 2023 US Open boys' doubles with Australian Hayden Jones, their run including a win over Henry Searle and Tomasz Berkieta. He was seeded sixth in the boys' singles at the 2024 Australian Open and recorded a win over Cruz Hewitt, son of former slam champion Lleyton Hewitt.

Razeghi reached the semi finals of the boys' doubles at the 2024 French Open alongside German Max Schönhaus. Later that season, he won the boys' doubles title at the 2024 Wimbledon Championships with Schönhaus, where they defeated top-seeded pair Federico Cinà and Maxim Mrva in the semi finals, and Czech pair Jan Kumstát and Jan Klimas in straight sets in the final.

He reached an ITF junior combined ranking of world No. 10 on 1 January 2024.

== Professional career ==
Alongside Cooper Woestendick, Razeghi won his first Pro title at the M15 Vero Beach, Florida on 27 April 2024.

Razeghi and compatriot Nikita Samuel Filin were awarded a wild card into the main draw of the 2024 US Open men's doubles tournament. In July 2025, Razeghi won his second Futures title in doubles, at the M25 Edwardsville.

== Personal life ==
In November 2023, Razeghi signed a letter of intent to attend Stanford University.

== ITF World Tennis Tour finals ==
=== Doubles: 2 (2 titles) ===
| Legend ITF WTT (2–0) |

| Result | W–L | Date | Tournament | Tier | Surface | Partner | Opponents | Score |
|---|---|---|---|---|---|---|---|---|
| Win | 1–0 | Apr 2024 | M15 Vero Beach, US | WTT | Clay | (United States) Cooper Woestendick | (United States) Alex Jones (United States) Miles Jones | 6–4, 4–6, [10–3] |
| Win | 2–0 | Jul 2025 | M25 Edwardsville, US | WTT | Hard | (United States) Kyle Kang | (United States) Spencer Johnson (United States) Nicolas Ian Kotzen | 6–7^{(6–8)}, 7–5, [10–8] |

== Junior Grand Slam finals ==
=== Doubles: 1 (title) ===
| Result | Year | Tournament | Surface | Partner | Opponents | Score |
|---|---|---|---|---|---|---|
| Win | 2024 | Wimbledon | Grass | (Germany) Max Schönhaus | (Czech Republic) Jan Klimas (Czech Republic) Jan Kumstát | 7–6^{(7–1)}, 6–4 |
