= 2024 US Open – Men's doubles =

Men's doubles
- 2024 US Open

Final
- Champions: (Australia) Max Purcell (Australia) Jordan Thompson
- Runners-up: (Germany) Kevin Krawietz (Germany) Tim Pütz
- Score: 6–4, 7–6^{(7–4)}

Details
- Draw: 64
- Seeds: 16

Events
| Singles | men | women | | boys | girls |
| Doubles | men | women | mixed | boys | girls |
| WC Singles | men | women | quad | boys | girls |
| WC Doubles | men | women | quad | boys | girls |
- US Open

Max Purcell and Jordan Thompson defeated Kevin Krawietz and Tim Pütz in the final, 6–4, 7–6^{(7–4)} to win the men's doubles tennis title at the 2024 US Open. They saved two match points (in the second round against Andreas Mies and John-Patrick Smith) en route to the title. It was Thompson's first major doubles title and Purcell's second.

Rajeev Ram and Joe Salisbury were the three-time defending champions, but lost in the third round to Nathaniel Lammons and Jackson Withrow. Ram and Salisbury were seeking to become the first doubles team in the Open Era (and the first team since Fred Alexander and Harold Hackett between 1907–1910) to win four consecutive US Open titles.

Marcel Granollers and Horacio Zeballos retained the ATP No. 1 doubles ranking by reaching the quarterfinals. Mate Pavić was also in contention for the top ranking at the beginning of the tournament.

This tournament marked the final major appearance of 2023 Wimbledon champion and former doubles world No. 1 Wesley Koolhof. He and Nikola Mektić lost in the quarterfinals to Lammons and Withrow.

For the first time at a major since the 2006 Wimbledon Championships, all eight teams that reached the quarterfinals were seeded.

== Seeds ==
1. (Spain) Marcel Granollers / (Argentina) Horacio Zeballos (quarterfinals)
2. (India) Rohan Bopanna / (Australia) Matthew Ebden (third round)
3. (United States) Rajeev Ram / (United Kingdom) Joe Salisbury (third round)
4. (El Salvador) Marcelo Arévalo / (Croatia) Mate Pavić (semifinals)
5. (Italy) Simone Bolelli / (Italy) Andrea Vavassori (third round)
6. (Finland) Harri Heliövaara / (United Kingdom) Henry Patten (third round)
7. (Australia) Max Purcell / (Australia) Jordan Thompson (champions)
8. (United Kingdom) Neal Skupski / (New Zealand) Michael Venus (quarterfinals)
9. (Mexico) Santiago González / (France) Édouard Roger-Vasselin (first round)
10. (Germany) Kevin Krawietz / (Germany) Tim Pütz (final)
11. (Netherlands) Wesley Koolhof / (Croatia) Nikola Mektić (quarterfinals)
12. (Monaco) Hugo Nys / (Poland) Jan Zieliński (second round)
13. (United States) Nathaniel Lammons / (United States) Jackson Withrow (semifinals)
14. (Croatia) Ivan Dodig / (Czech Republic) Adam Pavlásek (third round)
15. (United States) Austin Krajicek / (Netherlands) Jean-Julien Rojer (second round)
16. (Argentina) Máximo González / (Argentina) Andrés Molteni (quarterfinals)

Click on the seed number of a player to go to their draw section.

== Draw ==
Key

- Q = Qualifier
- WC = Wild card
- LL = Lucky loser
- Alt = Alternate
- ITF = ITF entry
- PR = Protected ranking
- SR = Special ranking
- SE = Special exempt
- JE = Junior exempt
- JR = Junior Accelerator Programme entrant
- CO = College Accelerator Programme entrant
- NG = Next Gen Accelerator Program entrant
- w/o = Walkover
- r = Retired
- d = Defaulted

=== Finals ===
Quarterfinals
1 | (Spain) Marcel Granollers (Argentina) Horacio Zeballos | 6^{4} | 4
7 | (Australia) Max Purcell (Australia) Jordan Thompson | 7^{7} | 6
13 | (United States) Nathaniel Lammons (United States) Jackson Withrow | 6 | 6^{5} | 6
11 | (Netherlands) Wesley Koolhof (Croatia) Nikola Mektić | 1 | 7^{7} | 4
8 | (United Kingdom) Neal Skupski (New Zealand) Michael Venus | 6^{1} | 1
4 | (El Salvador) Marcelo Arévalo (Croatia) Mate Pavić | 7^{7} | 6
10 | (Germany) Kevin Krawietz (Germany) Tim Pütz | 6^{11} | 6 | 6
16 | (Argentina) Máximo González (Argentina) Andrés Molteni | 7^{13} | 4 | 1

Semifinals
7 | (Australia) Max Purcell (Australia) Jordan Thompson | 6 | 7^{7}
13 | (United States) Nathaniel Lammons (United States) Jackson Withrow | 4 | 6^{4}
4 | (El Salvador) Marcelo Arévalo (Croatia) Mate Pavić | 3 | 7^{11} | 4
10 | (Germany) Kevin Krawietz (Germany) Tim Pütz | 6 | 6^{9} | 6

Final
7 | (Australia) Max Purcell (Australia) Jordan Thompson | 6 | 7^{7}
10 | (Germany) Kevin Krawietz (Germany) Tim Pütz | 4 | 6^{4}

=== Top half ===
==== Section 1 ====
First round
1 | (Spain) M Granollers (Argentina) H Zeballos | 6 | 6
(Argentina) F Cerúndolo (Argentina) C Ugo Carabelli | 4 | 2
(Austria) A Erler (Netherlands) M Middelkoop | 6 | 6
(Uruguay) A Behar (United Kingdom) L Johnson | 3 | 4
WC | (United States) R Seggerman (United States) P Trhac | 3 | 4
(India) Y Bhambri (France) A Olivetti | 6 | 6
(Germany) C Frantzen (Germany) H Jebens | 7^{7} | 5 | 4
15 | (United States) A Krajicek (Netherlands) J-J Rojer | 6^{3} | 7 | 6
12 | (Monaco) H Nys (Poland) J Zieliński | 7^{7} | 7
(Spain) P Martínez (Spain) J Munar | 6^{4} | 5
(Portugal) N Borges (Portugal) F Cabral | 7^{8} | 6
(Belgium) Z Bergs (Hungary) F Marozsán | 6^{6} | 2
Alt | (France) A Müller (Austria) S Ofner | 3 | 4
(Germany) A Mies (Australia) J-P Smith | 6 | 6
(United States) M Giron (Netherlands) B van de Zandschulp | 4 | 5
7 | (Australia) M Purcell (Australia) J Thompson | 6 | 7

Second round
1 | (Spain) M Granollers (Argentina) H Zeballos | 6 | 7^{7}
(Austria) A Erler (Netherlands) M Middelkoop | 3 | 6^{5}
(India) Y Bhambri (France) A Olivetti | 4 | 6 | 7
15 | (United States) A Krajicek (Netherlands) J-J Rojer | 6 | 3 | 5
12 | (Monaco) H Nys (Poland) J Zieliński | 6^{5} | 4
(Portugal) N Borges (Portugal) F Cabral | 7^{7} | 6
(Germany) A Mies (Australia) J-P Smith | 6 | 6^{3} | 3
7 | (Australia) M Purcell (Australia) J Thompson | 4 | 7^{7} | 6

Third round
1 | (Spain) M Granollers (Argentina) H Zeballos | 6 | 6
(India) Y Bhambri (France) A Olivetti | 2 | 2
(Portugal) N Borges (Portugal) F Cabral | 6^{3} | 3
7 | (Australia) M Purcell (Australia) J Thompson | 7^{7} | 6

Quarterfinals
1 | (Spain) M Granollers (Argentina) H Zeballos | 6^{4} | 4
7 | (Australia) M Purcell (Australia) J Thompson | 7^{7} | 6

==== Section 2 ====
First round
3 | (United States) R Ram (United Kingdom) J Salisbury | 6^{9} | 6 | 7
Alt | (Italy) L Darderi (Brazil) F Romboli | 7^{11} | 1 | 5
(Ecuador) D Hidalgo (Chile) A Tabilo | 4 | 7^{7} | 3
(United Kingdom) L Glasspool (Australia) R Hijikata | 6 | 6^{5} | 6
PR | (France) J Eysseric (France) F Martin | 7^{8} | 7
(United States) E King (United States) B Nakashima | 6^{6} | 5
WC | (United States) M Krueger (United States) R Stalder | 7^{9} | 5 | 4
13 | (United States) N Lammons (United States) J Withrow | 6^{7} | 7 | 6
11 | (Netherlands) W Koolhof (Croatia) N Mektić | 6 | 7^{7}
(Netherlands) T Griekspoor (Australia) T Kokkinakis | 2 | 6^{4}
PR | (Spain) P Carreño Busta (Spain) S Martos Gornés | 5 | 4
(Brazil) R Matos (Brazil) M Melo | 7 | 6
PR | (Italy) F Cobolli (Switzerland) D Stricker | 6 | 6
PR | (South Korea) S-w Kwon (Canada) D Shapovalov | 4 | 4
(France) S Doumbia (France) M Guinard | 4 | 5
6 | (Finland) H Heliövaara (United Kingdom) H Patten | 6 | 7

Second round
3 | (United States) R Ram (United Kingdom) J Salisbury | 6 | 7^{13}
(United Kingdom) L Glasspool (Australia) R Hijikata | 3 | 6^{11}
PR | (France) J Eysseric (France) F Martin | 6 | 5 | 5
13 | (United States) N Lammons (United States) J Withrow | 4 | 7 | 7
11 | (Netherlands) W Koolhof (Croatia) N Mektić | 6 | 6^{5} | 6
(Brazil) R Matos (Brazil) M Melo | 3 | 7^{7} | 3
PR | (Italy) F Cobolli (Switzerland) D Stricker | 0 | 5
6 | (Finland) H Heliövaara (United Kingdom) H Patten | 6 | 7

Third round
3 | (United States) R Ram (United Kingdom) J Salisbury | 6^{3} | 3
13 | (United States) N Lammons (United States) J Withrow | 7^{7} | 6
11 | (Netherlands) W Koolhof (Croatia) N Mektić | 6 | 6
6 | (Finland) H Heliövaara (United Kingdom) H Patten | 2 | 2

Quarterfinals
13 | (United States) N Lammons (United States) J Withrow | 6 | 6^{5} | 6
11 | (Netherlands) W Koolhof (Croatia) N Mektić | 1 | 7^{7} | 4

=== Bottom half ===
==== Section 3 ====
First round
8 | (United Kingdom) N Skupski (New Zealand) M Venus | 6 | 6
(France) H Gaston (France) G Jacq | 3 | 3
(Argentina) G Andreozzi (India) S Balaji | 5 | 6 | 7^{12}
PR | (New Zealand) M Daniell (Mexico) MÁ Reyes-Varela | 7 | 1 | 6^{10}
WC | (United States) M McDonald (United States) A Michelsen | 6^{4} | 1
(United Kingdom) J Cash (United States) R Galloway | 7^{7} | 6
WC | (United States) T Boyer (United States) Em Nava | 6 | 4 | 6
9 | (Mexico) S González (France) É Roger-Vasselin | 2 | 6 | 4
14 | (Croatia) I Dodig (Czech Republic) A Pavlásek | 6 | 6
WC | (United States) C Harrison (United States) V Kirkov | 3 | 4
(Colombia) N Barrientos (Tunisia) S Mansouri | 6 | 6
WC | (United States) NS Filin (United States) A Razeghi | 4 | 3
(Belgium) S Gillé (Belgium) J Vliegen | 6 | 6^{6} | 6
(Serbia) M Kecmanović; R Safiullin | 4 | 7^{8} | 2
(France) A Fils (France) G Mpetshi Perricard | 3 | 4
4 | (El Salvador) M Arévalo (Croatia) M Pavić | 6 | 6

Second round
8 | (United Kingdom) N Skupski (New Zealand) M Venus | 7^{7} | 6
(Argentina) G Andreozzi (India) S Balaji | 6^{4} | 4
(United Kingdom) J Cash (United States) R Galloway | 7^{10} | 3 | 4
WC | (United States) T Boyer (United States) Em Nava | 6^{8} | 6 | 6
14 | (Croatia) I Dodig (Czech Republic) A Pavlásek | 6 | 6^{5} | 6
(Colombia) N Barrientos (Tunisia) S Mansouri | 4 | 7^{7} | 3
(Belgium) S Gillé (Belgium) J Vliegen | 6^{4} | 7^{7} | 4
4 | (El Salvador) M Arévalo (Croatia) M Pavić | 7^{7} | 6^{3} | 6

Third round
8 | (United Kingdom) N Skupski (New Zealand) M Venus | 3 | 7^{7} | 6
WC | (United States) T Boyer (United States) Em Nava | 6 | 6^{3} | 4
14 | (Croatia) I Dodig (Czech Republic) A Pavlásek | 5 | 6^{4}
4 | (El Salvador) M Arévalo (Croatia) M Pavić | 7 | 7^{7}

Quarterfinals
8 | (United Kingdom) N Skupski (New Zealand) M Venus | 6^{1} | 1
4 | (El Salvador) M Arévalo (Croatia) M Pavić | 7^{7} | 6

==== Section 4 ====
First round
5 | (Italy) S Bolelli (Italy) A Vavassori | 6 | 6
(United States) W Blumberg (Norway) C Ruud | 3 | 4
(United Kingdom) J Murray (Australia) J Peers | 6 | 6^{6} | 6^{11}
(Sweden) A Göransson (Netherlands) S Verbeek | 4 | 7^{8} | 7^{13}
(France) A Mannarino (France) A Rinderknech | 2 | 3
(Brazil) T Monteiro (Argentina) M Navone | 6 | 6
(Ecuador) G Escobar (Kazakhstan) A Nedovyesov | 6^{6} | 4
10 | (Germany) K Krawietz (Germany) T Pütz | 7^{8} | 6
16 | (Argentina) M González (Argentina) A Molteni | 6 | 6
(Chile) N Jarry (Colombia) C Rodríguez | 4 | 4
WC | (United States) R Cash (United States) JJ Tracy | 6 | 6
Alt | (Kazakhstan) A Shevchenko (Austria) S Weissborn | 3 | 4
P Kotov (Brazil) T Seyboth Wild | 5 | 4
(Spain) R Carballés Baena (Argentina) F Coria | 7 | 6
(Netherlands) S Arends (Netherlands) R Haase | 3 | 5
2 | (India) R Bopanna (Australia) M Ebden | 6 | 7

Second round
5 | (Italy) S Bolelli (Italy) A Vavassori | 6 | 7^{7}
(Sweden) A Göransson (Netherlands) S Verbeek | 3 | 6^{3}
(Brazil) T Monteiro (Argentina) M Navone | 4 | 1
10 | (Germany) K Krawietz (Germany) T Pütz | 6 | 6
16 | (Argentina) M González (Argentina) A Molteni | 6^{2} | 7^{7} | 6
WC | (United States) R Cash (United States) JJ Tracy | 7^{7} | 6^{4} | 4
(Spain) R Carballés Baena (Argentina) F Coria | 2 | 4
2 | (India) R Bopanna (Australia) M Ebden | 6 | 6

Third round
5 | (Italy) S Bolelli (Italy) A Vavassori | 4 | 6 | 6^{4}
10 | (Germany) K Krawietz (Germany) T Pütz | 6 | 3 | 7^{10}
16 | (Argentina) M González (Argentina) A Molteni | 6 | 7
2 | (India) R Bopanna (Australia) M Ebden | 1 | 5

Quarterfinals
10 | (Germany) K Krawietz (Germany) T Pütz | 6^{11} | 6 | 6
16 | (Argentina) M González (Argentina) A Molteni | 7^{13} | 4 | 1

== Seeded teams ==
The following are the seeded teams. Seedings are based on ATP rankings as of August 19, 2024.

| Country | Player | Country | Player | Rank | Seed |
|---|---|---|---|---|---|
| ESP | Marcel Granollers | ARG | Horacio Zeballos | 2 | 1 |
| IND | Rohan Bopanna | AUS | Matthew Ebden | 7 | 2 |
| USA | Rajeev Ram | GBR | Joe Salisbury | 11 | 3 |
| ESA | Marcelo Arévalo | CRO | Mate Pavić | 15 | 4 |
| ITA | Simone Bolelli | ITA | Andrea Vavassori | 19 | 5 |
| FIN | Harri Heliövaara | GBR | Henry Patten | 23 | 6 |
| AUS | Max Purcell | AUS | Jordan Thompson | 31 | 7 |
| GBR | Neal Skupski | NZL | Michael Venus | 36 | 8 |
| MEX | Santiago González | FRA | Édouard Roger-Vasselin | 38 | 9 |
| GER | Kevin Krawietz | GER | Tim Pütz | 40 | 10 |
| NED | Wesley Koolhof | CRO | Nikola Mektić | 42 | 11 |
| MON | Hugo Nys | POL | Jan Zieliński | 49 | 12 |
| USA | Nathaniel Lammons | USA | Jackson Withrow | 52 | 13 |
| CRO | Ivan Dodig | CZE | Adam Pavlásek | 60 | 14 |
| USA | Austin Krajicek | NED | Jean-Julien Rojer | 61 | 15 |
| ARG | Máximo González | ARG | Andrés Molteni | 62 | 16 |

== Other entry information ==
=== Wildcards ===
- (United States) Tristan Boyer / (United States) Emilio Nava
- (United States) Robert Cash / (United States) JJ Tracy
- (United States) Nikita Samuel Filin / (United States) Alexander Razeghi
- (United States) Christian Harrison / (United States) Vasil Kirkov
- (United States) Mitchell Krueger / (United States) Reese Stalder
- (United States) Mackenzie McDonald / (United States) Alex Michelsen
- (United States) Ryan Seggerman / (United States) Patrik Trhac

=== Protected ranking ===
- (Spain) Pablo Carreño Busta / (Spain) Sergio Martos Gornés
- (Italy) Flavio Cobolli / (Switzerland) Dominic Stricker
- (New Zealand) Marcus Daniell / (Mexico) Miguel Ángel Reyes-Varela
- (France) Jonathan Eysseric / (France) Fabrice Martin
- (South Korea) Kwon Soon-woo / (Canada) Denis Shapovalov

=== Alternates ===
- (Italy) Luciano Darderi / (Brazil) Fernando Romboli
- (France) Alexandre Müller / (Austria) Sebastian Ofner
- (Kazakhstan) Alexander Shevchenko / (Austria) Sam Weissborn

=== Withdrawals ===
- (Italy) Marco Bortolotti / (Italy) Flavio Cobolli → replaced by (Italy) Flavio Cobolli / (Switzerland) Dominic Stricker
- (Argentina) Facundo Díaz Acosta / (Argentina) Tomás Martín Etcheverry → replaced by (Italy) Luciano Darderi / (Brazil) Fernando Romboli
- (Czech Republic) Tomáš Macháč / (China) Zhang Zhizhen → replaced by (France) Alexandre Müller / (Austria) Sebastian Ofner
- (India) Sumit Nagal / (Japan) Yoshihito Nishioka → replaced by (Kazakhstan) Alexander Shevchenko / (Austria) Sam Weissborn
