= 2024 US Open – Women's doubles =

Women's doubles
- 2024 US Open

Final
- Champions: (Ukraine) Lyudmyla Kichenok (Latvia) Jeļena Ostapenko
- Runners-up: (France) Kristina Mladenovic (China) Zhang Shuai
- Score: 6–4, 6–3

Details
- Draw: 64
- Seeds: 16

Events
Singles	men	women		boys	girls
Doubles	men	women	mixed	boys	girls
WC Singles	men	women	quad	boys	girls
WC Doubles	men	women	quad	boys	girls
- US Open

Lyudmyla Kichenok and Jeļena Ostapenko defeated Kristina Mladenovic and Zhang Shuai in the final, 6–4, 6–3 to win the women's doubles tennis title at the 2024 US Open. It was the first major women's doubles title for both players. They did not drop a set during the tournament. Kichenok and Ostapenko became the first Ukrainian and Latvian player respectively to win the women's doubles title at the US Open. Ostapenko also became the first Latvian to win a major doubles title.

Gabriela Dabrowski and Erin Routliffe were the defending champions, but lost in the quarterfinals to Chan Hao-ching and Veronika Kudermetova.

Kateřina Siniaková regained the WTA number 1 doubles ranking at the end of the tournament. Routliffe and Elise Mertens were also in contention for the top ranking at the beginning of the tournament.

Hsieh Su-wei was aiming to complete a career Grand Slam in women's doubles. She and Mertens lost in the first round to Mladenovic and Zhang.

== Seeds ==
1. (Canada) Gabriela Dabrowski / (New Zealand) Erin Routliffe (quarterfinals)
2. (Chinese Taipei) Hsieh Su-wei / (Belgium) Elise Mertens (first round)
3. (Czech Republic) Kateřina Siniaková / (United States) Taylor Townsend (semifinals)
4. (United States) Caroline Dolehide / (United States) Desirae Krawczyk (second round)
5. (United States) Nicole Melichar-Martinez / (Australia) Ellen Perez (quarterfinals)
6. (Italy) Sara Errani / (Italy) Jasmine Paolini (second round)
7. (Ukraine) Lyudmyla Kichenok / (Latvia) Jeļena Ostapenko (champions)
8. (Netherlands) Demi Schuurs / (Brazil) Luisa Stefani (quarterfinals)
9. (United States) Sofia Kenin / (United States) Bethanie Mattek-Sands (third round)
10. (Chinese Taipei) Chan Hao-ching / Veronika Kudermetova (semifinals)
11. (Czech Republic) Marie Bouzková / (Spain) Sara Sorribes Tormo (third round)
12. (Brazil) Beatriz Haddad Maia / (Germany) Laura Siegemund (third round)
13. (Mexico) Giuliana Olmos / Alexandra Panova (second round)
14. (Spain) Cristina Bucșa / (China) Xu Yifan (first round)
15. (Norway) Ulrikke Eikeri / (Estonia) Ingrid Neel (first round)
16. (Japan) Ena Shibahara / (Indonesia) Aldila Sutjiadi (second round)

Click on the seed number of a player to go to their draw section.

== Draw ==
Key

- Q = Qualifier
- WC = Wild card
- LL = Lucky loser
- Alt = Alternate
- ITF = ITF entry
- PR = Protected ranking
- SR = Special ranking
- SE = Special exempt
- JE = Junior exempt
- JR = Junior Accelerator Programme entrant
- CO = College Accelerator Programme entrant
- NG = Next Gen Accelerator Program entrant
- w/o = Walkover
- r = Retired
- d = Defaulted

=== Finals ===
Quarterfinals
1	(Canada) Gabriela Dabrowski (New Zealand) Erin Routliffe	6	5	3
10	(Chinese Taipei) Chan Hao-ching; Veronika Kudermetova	4	7	6
(Kazakhstan) Anna Danilina; Irina Khromacheva	6^{2}	4
7	(Ukraine) Lyudmyla Kichenok (Latvia) Jeļena Ostapenko	7^{7}	6
8	(Netherlands) Demi Schuurs (Brazil) Luisa Stefani	2	3
3	(Czech Republic) Kateřina Siniaková (United States) Taylor Townsend	6	6
5	(United States) Nicole Melichar-Martinez (Australia) Ellen Perez	6^{2}	4
(France) Kristina Mladenovic (China) Zhang Shuai	7^{7}	6

Semifinals
10	(Chinese Taipei) Chan Hao-ching; Veronika Kudermetova	1	2
7	(Ukraine) Lyudmyla Kichenok (Latvia) Jeļena Ostapenko	6	6
3	(Czech Republic) Kateřina Siniaková (United States) Taylor Townsend	5	6	3
(France) Kristina Mladenovic (China) Zhang Shuai	7	4	6

Final
7	(Ukraine) Lyudmyla Kichenok (Latvia) Jeļena Ostapenko	6	6
(France) Kristina Mladenovic (China) Zhang Shuai	4	3

=== Top half ===
==== Section 1 ====
First round
1	(Canada) G Dabrowski (New Zealand) E Routliffe	6	6
(Canada) L Fernandez (Kazakhstan) Y Putintseva	4	2
(Ukraine) A Kalinina (Italy) M Trevisan	7	6^{9}	3
PR	(United States) C Harrison (Poland) A Rosolska	5	7^{11}	6
PR	(Croatia) P Martić (United States) S Rogers	6	5	6
PR	(Australia) A Tomljanović (Bulgaria) V Tomova	0	7	2
(Romania) J Cristian (Italy) A Moratelli	6	6
15	(Norway) U Eikeri (Estonia) I Neel	3	4
10	(Chinese Taipei) H-c Chan; V Kudermetova	4	6	6
(Italy) E Cocciaretto (Denmark) C Tauson	6	4	3
E Alexandrova; A Blinkova	1	3
WC	(United States) C Corley (United States) I Corley	6	6
(United Kingdom) H Dart (France) D Parry	3	6	7^{10}
(Czech Republic) L Nosková; D Shnaider	6	3	6^{6}
(Japan) M Kato (China) Y Wang	3	2
6	(Italy) S Errani (Italy) J Paolini	6	6

Second round
1	(Canada) G Dabrowski (New Zealand) E Routliffe	7	6
PR	(United States) C Harrison (Poland) A Rosolska	5	4
PR	(Croatia) P Martić (United States) S Rogers	3	4
(Romania) J Cristian (Italy) A Moratelli	6	6
10	(Chinese Taipei) H-c Chan; V Kudermetova	7^{9}	6^{4}	6
WC	(United States) C Corley (United States) I Corley	6^{7}	7^{7}	4
(United Kingdom) H Dart (France) D Parry	7^{7}	3	6
6	(Italy) S Errani (Italy) J Paolini	6^{3}	6	3

Third round
1	(Canada) G Dabrowski (New Zealand) E Routliffe	7	7^{7}
(Romania) J Cristian (Italy) A Moratelli	5	6^{3}
10	(Chinese Taipei) H-c Chan; V Kudermetova	6	6
(United Kingdom) H Dart (France) D Parry	4	4

Quarterfinals
1	(Canada) G Dabrowski (New Zealand) E Routliffe	6	5	3
10	(Chinese Taipei) H-c Chan; V Kudermetova	4	7	6

==== Section 2 ====
First round
4	(United States) C Dolehide (United States) D Krawczyk	7	6
WC	(United States) H Baptiste (United States) W Osuigwe	5	1
(Kazakhstan) A Danilina; I Khromacheva	7^{8}	5	6
WC	(United States) TC Grant (United States) I Jovic	6^{6}	7	2
(New Zealand) L Sun (China) Xiy Wang	4	3
(Slovakia) T Mihalíková (United Kingdom) O Nicholls	6	6
(Germany) T Maria (Slovakia) AK Schmiedlová	4	3
16	(Japan) E Shibahara (Indonesia) A Sutjiadi	6	6
12	(Brazil) B Haddad Maia (Germany) L Siegemund	6	6
(France) V Gracheva (Georgia (country)) O Kalashnikova	3	2
PR	(United Kingdom) S Murray Sharan (Italy) C Rosatello	6^{6}	2
WC	(United States) R Montgomery (United States) C Ngounoue	7^{8}	6
(China) X Jiang (Japan) M Ninomiya	6	6
(Hungary) A Bondár (France) C Burel	1	2
WC	(United States) J Aney (United States) J Failla	3	3
7	(Ukraine) L Kichenok (Latvia) J Ostapenko	6	6

Second round
4	(United States) C Dolehide (United States) D Krawczyk	3	4
(Kazakhstan) A Danilina; I Khromacheva	6	6
(Slovakia) T Mihalíková (United Kingdom) O Nicholls	4	7	6
16	(Japan) E Shibahara (Indonesia) A Sutjiadi	6	5	3
12	(Brazil) B Haddad Maia (Germany) L Siegemund	6	6
WC	(United States) R Montgomery (United States) C Ngounoue	2	2
(China) X Jiang (Japan) M Ninomiya	3	3
7	(Ukraine) L Kichenok (Latvia) J Ostapenko	6	6

Third round
(Kazakhstan) A Danilina; I Khromacheva	6	6
(Slovakia) T Mihalíková (United Kingdom) O Nicholls	4	4
12	(Brazil) B Haddad Maia (Germany) L Siegemund	3	6^{5}
7	(Ukraine) L Kichenok (Latvia) J Ostapenko	6	7^{7}

Quarterfinals
(Kazakhstan) A Danilina; I Khromacheva	6^{2}	4
7	(Ukraine) L Kichenok (Latvia) J Ostapenko	7^{7}	6

=== Bottom half ===
==== Section 3 ====
First round
8	(Netherlands) D Schuurs (Brazil) L Stefani	6	6
(Japan) S Aoyama (Japan) E Hozumi	3	2
(United Kingdom) K Boulter; A Kalinskaya	2	7	6
(China) Xin Wang (China) S Zheng	6	5	2
(United Kingdom) M Lumsden (Czech Republic) A Sisková	3	7	7
(China) H Guo (Romania) M Niculescu	6	5	5
(Hungary) T Babos (Ukraine) N Kichenok	1	4
9	(United States) S Kenin (United States) B Mattek-Sands	6	6
13	(Mexico) G Olmos; A Panova	6	5	6
PR	(Netherlands) A Rus (Serbia) N Stojanović	0	7	1
(United States) A Muhammad (United Kingdom) H Watson	7	7^{7}
(Japan) M Uchijima (China) Y Yuan	5	6^{0}
PR	(Ukraine) K Baindl (United States) K Volynets	1	6^{5}
(Ukraine) M Kostyuk (Romania) E-G Ruse	6	7^{7}
(Italy) L Bronzetti; L Samsonova	7	2	2
3	(Czech Republic) K Siniaková (United States) T Townsend	5	6	6

Second round
8	(Netherlands) D Schuurs (Brazil) L Stefani	7^{10}	7^{7}
(United Kingdom) K Boulter; A Kalinskaya	6^{8}	6^{5}
(United Kingdom) M Lumsden (Czech Republic) A Sisková	2	1
9	(United States) S Kenin (United States) B Mattek-Sands	6	6
13	(Mexico) G Olmos; A Panova	6^{4}	3
(United States) A Muhammad (United Kingdom) H Watson	7^{7}	6
(Ukraine) M Kostyuk (Romania) E-G Ruse
3	(Czech Republic) K Siniaková (United States) T Townsend	w/o

Third round
8	(Netherlands) D Schuurs (Brazil) L Stefani	6	6
9	(United States) S Kenin (United States) B Mattek-Sands	4	3
(United States) A Muhammad (United Kingdom) H Watson	1	7	5
3	(Czech Republic) K Siniaková (United States) T Townsend	6	5	7

Quarterfinals
8	(Netherlands) D Schuurs (Brazil) L Stefani	2	3
3	(Czech Republic) K Siniaková (United States) T Townsend	6	6

==== Section 4 ====
First round
5	(United States) N Melichar-Martinez (Australia) E Perez	6	7
WC	(United States) M Kessler (United States) S Santamaria	4	5
Alt	(Switzerland) V Golubic (United Kingdom) T Moore	6	6
WC	(United States) A Rogers (United States) A Smith	2	2
K Rakhimova; A Sasnovich	6	6
(Armenia) E Avanesyan (Poland) K Piter	2	4
(United States) A Krueger (United States) S Stephens	7	2	4
11	(Czech Republic) M Bouzková (Spain) S Sorribes Tormo	5	6	6
14	(Spain) C Bucșa (China) Y Xu	3	7^{7}	6^{4}
M Andreeva; A Pavlyuchenkova	6	6^{5}	7^{10}
(Australia) O Gadecki (Chinese Taipei) F-h Wu	4	7^{8}	1
(Colombia) C Osorio (United States) A Parks	6	6^{6}	6
A Potapova; Y Sizikova	5	6	3
(Poland) M Linette (United States) P Stearns	7	3	6
(France) K Mladenovic (China) S Zhang	6	6
2	(Chinese Taipei) S-w Hsieh (Belgium) E Mertens	2	3

Second round
5	(United States) N Melichar-Martinez (Australia) E Perez	6	6
Alt	(Switzerland) V Golubic (United Kingdom) T Moore	2	3
K Rakhimova; A Sasnovich	4	1
11	(Czech Republic) M Bouzková (Spain) S Sorribes Tormo	6	6
M Andreeva; A Pavlyuchenkova	6	6
(Colombia) C Osorio (United States) A Parks	3	0
(Poland) M Linette (United States) P Stearns	2	6	3
(France) K Mladenovic (China) S Zhang	6	4	6

Third round
5	(United States) N Melichar-Martinez (Australia) E Perez	6	6
11	(Czech Republic) M Bouzková (Spain) S Sorribes Tormo	2	4
M Andreeva; A Pavlyuchenkova	2	4
(France) K Mladenovic (China) S Zhang	6	6

Quarterfinals
5	(United States) N Melichar-Martinez (Australia) E Perez	6^{2}	4
(France) K Mladenovic (China) S Zhang	7^{7}	6

== Seeded teams ==
The following are the seeded teams. Seedings are based on WTA rankings as of August 19, 2024.

Country	Player	Country	Player	Rank	Seed
CAN	Gabriela Dabrowski	NZL	Erin Routliffe	3	1
TPE	Hsieh Su-wei	BEL	Elise Mertens	9	2
CZE	Kateřina Siniaková	USA	Taylor Townsend	10	3
USA	Caroline Dolehide	USA	Desirae Krawczyk	17	4
USA	Nicole Melichar-Martinez	AUS	Ellen Perez	22	5
ITA	Sara Errani	ITA	Jasmine Paolini	26	6
UKR	Lyudmyla Kichenok	LAT	Jeļena Ostapenko	35	7
NED	Demi Schuurs	BRA	Luisa Stefani	45	8
USA	Sofia Kenin	USA	Bethanie Mattek-Sands	49	9
TPE	Chan Hao-ching		Veronika Kudermetova	53	10
CZE	Marie Bouzková	ESP	Sara Sorribes Tormo	55	11
BRA	Beatriz Haddad Maia	GER	Laura Siegemund	56	12
MEX	Giuliana Olmos		Alexandra Panova	68	13
ESP	Cristina Bucșa	CHN	Xu Yifan	70	14
NOR	Ulrikke Eikeri	EST	Ingrid Neel	73	15
JPN	Ena Shibahara	INA	Aldila Sutjiadi	74	16

== Other entry information ==
=== Wildcards ===
- (United States) Jessie Aney / (United States) Jessica Failla
- (United States) Hailey Baptiste / (United States) Whitney Osuigwe
- (United States) Carmen Corley / (United States) Ivana Corley
- (United States) Tyra Caterina Grant / (United States) Iva Jovic
- (United States) McCartney Kessler / (United States) Sabrina Santamaria
- (United States) Robin Montgomery / (United States) Clervie Ngounoue
- (United States) Anna Rogers / (United States) Alana Smith

=== Protected ranking ===
- (Ukraine) Kateryna Baindl / (United States) Katie Volynets
- (United States) Catherine Harrison / (Poland) Alicja Rosolska
- (Croatia) Petra Martić / (United States) Shelby Rogers
- (United Kingdom) Samantha Murray Sharan / (Italy) Camilla Rosatello
- (Netherlands) Arantxa Rus / (Serbia) Nina Stojanović
- (Australia) Ajla Tomljanović / (Bulgaria) Viktoriya Tomova

=== Alternates ===
- (Switzerland) Viktorija Golubic / (United Kingdom) Tara Moore

=== Withdrawals ===
- (United States) Danielle Collins / (France) Caroline Garcia → replaced by (Switzerland) Viktorija Golubic / (United Kingdom) Tara Moore
