= 2024 US Open – Girls' singles =

Girls' singles
- 2024 US Open

Final
- Champion: (United Kingdom) Mika Stojsavljevic
- Runner-up: (Japan) Wakana Sonobe
- Score: 6–4, 6–4

Events
Singles	men	women		boys	girls
Doubles	men	women	mixed	boys	girls
WC Singles	men	women	quad	boys	girls
WC Doubles	men	women	quad	boys	girls
- US Open

Mika Stojsavljevic won the girls' singles title at the 2024 US Open, defeating Wakana Sonobe in the final, 6–4, 6–4. Stojsavljevic became the second British player to win the girls' singles title, after Heather Watson in 2009.

Katherine Hui was the reigning champion, but was no longer eligible to compete in junior events.

== Seeds ==
1. (Australia) Emerson Jones (third round)
2. (United States) Tyra Caterina Grant (quarterfinals)
3. (United States) Iva Jovic (semifinals)
4. (Serbia) Teodora Kostović (quarterfinals)
5. (Belgium) Jeline Vandromme (third round)
6. (United Kingdom) Hannah Klugman (second round)
7. (Japan) Wakana Sonobe (final)
8. (United Kingdom) Mingge Xu (semifinals)
9. (United States) Kristina Penickova (third round)
10. (Bulgaria) Rositsa Dencheva (third round)
11. (Bulgaria) Iva Ivanova (second round)
12. (Chile) Antonia Vergara Rivera (first round)
13. (United States) Kaitlyn Rolls (second round)
14. (Kazakhstan) Sonja Zhiyenbayeva (third round)
15. (Czech Republic) Vendula Valdmannová (third round)
16. (United States) Akasha Urhobo (first round)

Click on the seed number of a player to go to their draw section.

== Draw ==
Key

- Q = Qualifier
- WC = Wild card
- LL = Lucky loser
- Alt = Alternate
- ITF = ITF entry
- PR = Protected ranking
- SR = Special ranking
- SE = Special exempt
- JE = Junior exempt
- JR = Junior Accelerator Programme entrant
- CO = College Accelerator Programme entrant
- NG = Next Gen Accelerator Program entrant
- w/o = Walkover
- r = Retired
- d = Defaulted

=== Finals ===
Quarterfinals
(United Kingdom) Mika Stojsavljevic	6	7^{7}
WC	(United States) Annika Penickova	2	6^{3}
3/WC	(United States) Iva Jovic	6	6
WC	(United States) Valerie Glozman	4	4
7	(Japan) Wakana Sonobe	6	6
4	(Serbia) Teodora Kostović	3	4
8	(United Kingdom) Mingge Xu	7	5	6
2	(United States) Tyra Caterina Grant	5	7	4

Semifinals
(United Kingdom) Mika Stojsavljevic	6	3	6
3/WC	(United States) Iva Jovic	0	6	3
7	(Japan) Wakana Sonobe	6	6
8	(United Kingdom) Mingge Xu	4	4

Final
(United Kingdom) Mika Stojsavljevic	6	6
7	(Japan) Wakana Sonobe	4	4

=== Top half ===
==== Section 1 ====
First round
1	(Australia) Emerson Jones	7	7^{7}
Q	(United States) Maya Iyengar	5	6^{5}
(Czech Republic) Alena Kovačková	6	6
(Benin) Gloriana Goreti Nahum	1	2
(Spain) Charo Esquiva Bañuls	7^{7}	2	2
(United Kingdom) Mika Stojsavljevic	6^{5}	6	6
(Brazil) Olivia Carneiro	6^{1}	6	3
13	(United States) Kaitlyn Rolls	7^{7}	2	6
12	(Chile) Antonia Vergara Rivera	2	3
WC	(United States) Annika Penickova	6	6
Q	(Japan) Kanon Sawashiro	6	6
(United States) Thea Frodin	3	2
SE	(Italy) Noemi Basiletti	6	6
WC	(United States) Anita Tu	0	2
Q	(France) Ksenia Efremova	6^{8}	6^{5}
5	(Belgium) Jeline Vandromme	7^{10}	7^{7}

Second round
1	(Australia) E Jones	5	6	7
(Czech Republic) A Kovačková	7	2	5
(United Kingdom) M Stojsavljevic	6	6
13	(United States) K Rolls	1	0
WC	(United States) A Penickova	6	6
Q	(Japan) K Sawashiro	3	3
SE	(Italy) N Basiletti	2	4
5	(Belgium) J Vandromme	6	6

Third round
1	(Australia) E Jones	5	4
(United Kingdom) M Stojsavljevic	7	6
WC	(United States) A Penickova	6^{7}	6	6
5	(Belgium) J Vandromme	7^{9}	4	3

Quarterfinals
(United Kingdom) M Stojsavljevic	6	7^{7}
WC	(United States) A Penickova	2	6^{3}

==== Section 2 ====
First round
3/WC	(United States) Iva Jovic	6	7^{7}
Q	(Italy) Gaia Maduzzi	2	6^{2}
(Japan) Reina Goto	6	2	0
(Poland) Monika Stankiewicz	4	6	6
WC	(United States) Alanis Hamilton	7^{7}	6
(Czech Republic) Lucie Urbanová	6^{4}	3
(Norway) Emily Sartz-Lunde	6^{5}	3
14	(Kazakhstan) Sonja Zhiyenbayeva	7^{7}	6
11	(Bulgaria) Iva Ivanova	7^{7}	6
(South Korea) Jang Ga-eul	6^{5}	3
WC	(United States) Valerie Glozman	6	6
Yuliya Perapekhina	3	0
(Czech Republic) Tereza Krejčová	1	7^{7}	6
WC	(United States) Shannon Lam	6	6^{5}	3
(Germany) Sonja Zhenikhova	3	2
6	(United Kingdom) Hannah Klugman	6	6

Second round
3/WC	(United States) I Jovic	6	6
(Poland) M Stankiewicz	2	4
WC	(United States) A Hamilton	3	6^{3}
14	(Kazakhstan) S Zhiyenbayeva	6	7^{7}
11	(Bulgaria) I Ivanova	1	1
WC	(United States) V Glozman	6	6
(Czech Republic) T Krejčová	6	6
6	(United Kingdom) H Klugman	4	4

Third round
3/WC	(United States) I Jovic	6	6
14	(Kazakhstan) S Zhiyenbayeva	1	2
WC	(United States) V Glozman	6	6
(Czech Republic) T Krejčová	0	3

Quarterfinals
3/WC	(United States) I Jovic	6	6
WC	(United States) V Glozman	4	4

=== Bottom half ===
==== Section 3 ====
First round
7	(Japan) Wakana Sonobe	6	6
Q	(United States) Kate Fakih	2	2
(United States) Aspen Schuman	6	1	0
(Czech Republic) Julie Paštiková	4	6	6
(Brazil) Victória Luiza Barros	2	3
(Netherlands) Joy de Zeeuw	6	6
(Bulgaria) Elizara Yaneva	6	2	3
9	(United States) Kristina Penickova	4	6	6
16	(United States) Akasha Urhobo	6	6
(Lithuania) Laima Vladson	1	1
(Czech Republic) Eliška Ticháčková	7^{7}	6
(Kazakhstan) Asylzhan Arystanbekova	6^{5}	1
SE	(Slovakia) Mia Pohánková	6	6^{4}	6
(Italy) Vittoria Paganetti	2	7^{7}	1
WC	(United States) Julieta Pareja	4	6	0
4	(Serbia) Teodora Kostović	6	4	6

Second round
7	(Japan) W Sonobe	6	6
(Czech Republic) J Paštiková	3	2
(Netherlands) J de Zeeuw	3	4
9	(United States) K Penickova	6	6
16	(United States) A Urhobo	6	3	0
(Czech Republic) E Ticháčková	4	6	6
SE	(Slovakia) M Pohánková	6^{3}	2
4	(Serbia) T Kostović	7^{7}	6

Third round
7	(Japan) W Sonobe	7	6
9	(United States) K Penickova	5	4
(Czech Republic) E Ticháčková	6	5	2
4	(Serbia) T Kostović	3	7	6

Quarterfinals
7	(Japan) W Sonobe	6	6
4	(Serbia) T Kostović	3	4

==== Section 4 ====
First round
8	(United Kingdom) Mingge Xu	6	4	6
(Austria) Lilli Tagger	2	6	1
Q	(United States) Christasha McNeil	7	7^{10}
(Argentina) Luna María Cinalli	5	6^{8}
(Ukraine) Yelyzaveta Kotliar	4	3
WC	(United States) Ishika Ashar	6	6
Q	(United States) Monika Ekstrand	6	6^{4}	6^{6}
10	(Bulgaria) Rositsa Dencheva	1	7^{7}	7^{10}
15	(Czech Republic) Vendula Valdmannová	6	6
(Germany) Julia Stusek	1	2
(Morocco) Malak El Allami	3	6	6
Q	(United States) Capucine Jauffret	6	3	3
(Dominican Republic) Anna María Fedotova	6	0	3
(Sweden) Lea Nilsson	4	6	6
(Japan) Mayu Crossley	0	0
2	(United States) Tyra Caterina Grant	6	6

Second round
8	(United Kingdom) M Xu	4	7	6
Q	(United States) C McNeil	6	5	2
WC	(United States) I Ashar	3	4
10	(Bulgaria) R Dencheva	6	6
15	(Czech Republic) V Valdmannová	4	6	6
(Morocco) M El Allami	6	2	3
(Sweden) L Nilsson	3	4
2	(United States) TC Grant	6	6

Third round
8	(United Kingdom) M Xu	6	6
10	(Bulgaria) R Dencheva	2	1
15	(Czech Republic) V Valdmannová	2	4
2	(United States) TC Grant	6	6

Quarterfinals
8	(United Kingdom) M Xu	7	5	6
2	(United States) TC Grant	5	7	4

== Qualifying ==
=== Seeds ===
1. (Japan) Kanon Sawashiro (qualified)
2. (United States) Christasha McNeil (qualified)
3. (Japan) Hikari Yamamoto (qualifying competition)
4. (Sweden) Nellie Taraba Wallberg (qualifying competition)
5. (Japan) Shiho Tsujioka (qualifying competition, retired)
6. (United States) Kate Fakih (qualified)
7. (United States) Maya Iyengar (qualified)
8. (United States) Claire An (qualifying competition)
9. (Turkey) Deniz Dilek (first round)
10. (Egypt) Jana Hossam Salah (qualifying competition)
11. (United States) Monika Ekstrand (qualified)
12. (Italy) Gaia Maduzzi (qualified)
13. (Canada) Nadia Lagaev (first round)
14. (France) Ksenia Efremova (qualified)
15. (United States) Mia Slama (qualifying competition)
16. (United States) Capucine Jauffret (qualified)

=== Qualifiers ===
1. (Japan) Kanon Sawashiro
2. (United States) Christasha McNeil
3. (United States) Monika Ekstrand
4. (United States) Capucine Jauffret
5. (Italy) Gaia Maduzzi
6. (United States) Kate Fakih
7. (United States) Maya Iyengar
8. (France) Ksenia Efremova

=== Draw ===
==== First qualifier ====
First round
1	(Japan) Kanon Sawashiro	4	7^{7}	[10]
WC	(United States) Welles Newman	6	6^{4}	[1]
(Denmark) Laura Brunkel	1	4
15	(United States) Mia Slama	6	6

Qualifying competition
1	(Japan) Kanon Sawashiro	6	7^{7}
15	(United States) Mia Slama	2	6^{5}

==== Second qualifier ====
First round
2	(United States) Christasha McNeil	6	6
(Canada) Emma Dong	3	4
(United States) Trinetra Vijayakumar	5	0
10	(Egypt) Jana Hossam Salah	7	6

Qualifying competition
2	(United States) Christasha McNeil	6	6
10	(Egypt) Jana Hossam Salah	2	4

==== Third qualifier ====
First round
3	(Japan) Hikari Yamamoto	6	6
WC	(United States) Margaret Sohns	2	3
(China) Ye Shiyu	3	0
11	(United States) Monika Ekstrand	6	6

Qualifying competition
3	(Japan) Hikari Yamamoto	2	3
11	(United States) Monika Ekstrand	6	6

==== Fourth qualifier ====
First round
4	(Sweden) Nellie Taraba Wallberg	6	6
(United States) Maya Rani Dutta	3	3
(Japan) Hinata Chiba	6	1	[9]
16	(United States) Capucine Jauffret	2	6	[11]

Qualifying competition
4	(Sweden) Nellie Taraba Wallberg	6^{2}	4	[10]
16	(United States) Capucine Jauffret	7^{7}	4	[12]

==== Fifth qualifier ====
First round
5	(Japan) Shiho Tsujioka	6	6
(United States) Nancy Lee	0	1
WC	(United States) Olivia Center	5	3
12	(Italy) Gaia Maduzzi	7	6

Qualifying competition
5	(Japan) Shiho Tsujioka	2	0^{r}
12	(Italy) Gaia Maduzzi	6	2

==== Sixth qualifier ====
First round
6	(United States) Kate Fakih	6^{8}	6	[10]
(Israel) Mika Buchnik	7^{10}	2	[5]
(United States) Leena Friedman	6	6
9	(Turkey) Deniz Dilek	4	4

Qualifying competition
6	(United States) Kate Fakih	6	6
(United States) Leena Friedman	4	2

==== Seventh qualifier ====
First round
7	(United States) Maya Iyengar	6	6
(Romania) Eva Maria Ionescu	3	4
WC	(United States) Raya Kotseva	6	6
13	(Canada) Nadia Lagaev	3	4

Qualifying competition
7	(United States) Maya Iyengar	6	1	[10]
WC	(United States) Raya Kotseva	4	6	[7]

==== Eighth qualifier ====
First round
8	(United States) Claire An	6	5	[10]
(Australia) Lily Taylor	3	7	[6]
WC	(United States) Anna Frey	6	1	[8]
14	(France) Ksenia Efremova	3	6	[10]

Qualifying competition
8	(United States) Claire An	2	3
14	(France) Ksenia Efremova	6	6
