= 2024 US Open – Mixed doubles =

Mixed doubles
- 2024 US Open

Final
- Champions: (Italy) Sara Errani (Italy) Andrea Vavassori
- Runners-up: (United States) Taylor Townsend (United States) Donald Young
- Score: 7–6^{(7–0)}, 7–5

Details
- Draw: 32
- Seeds: 8

Events
Singles	men	women		boys	girls
Doubles	men	women	mixed	boys	girls
WC Singles	men	women	quad	boys	girls
WC Doubles	men	women	quad	boys	girls
- US Open

Sara Errani and Andrea Vavassori defeated Taylor Townsend and Donald Young in the final, 7–6^{(7–0)}, 7–5 to win the mixed doubles tennis title at the 2024 US Open. Errani and Vavassori saved a match point en route to the title, in the first round against Robert Galloway and Shelby Rogers. Errani and Vavassori became the first all-Italian pair to win the title, with Errani becoming the first Italian woman to win the title since Raffaella Reggi in 1986. This tournament marked Young's final professional appearance.

Anna Danilina and Harri Heliövaara were the defending champions, but lost in the quarterfinals to Townsend and Young.

Ivan Dodig was vying to complete a career Grand Slam in mixed doubles, but he and Nicole Melichar-Martinez lost in the first round to Nadiia Kichenok and Hugo Nys.

== Seeds ==
1. (Canada) Gabriela Dabrowski / (United Kingdom) Joe Salisbury (first round)
2. (New Zealand) Erin Routliffe / (New Zealand) Michael Venus (first round)
3. (Italy) Sara Errani / (Italy) Andrea Vavassori (champions)
4. (Czech Republic) Barbora Krejčíková / (Australia) Matthew Ebden (quarterfinals)
5. (United States) Desirae Krawczyk / (United Kingdom) Neal Skupski (first round)
6. (United States) Nicole Melichar-Martinez / (Croatia) Ivan Dodig (first round)
7. (Chinese Taipei) Hsieh Su-wei / (Poland) Jan Zieliński (quarterfinals)
8. (Indonesia) Aldila Sutjiadi / (India) Rohan Bopanna (semifinals)

== Draw ==
Key

- Q = Qualifier
- WC = Wild card
- LL = Lucky loser
- Alt = Alternate
- ITF = ITF entry
- PR = Protected ranking
- SR = Special ranking
- SE = Special exempt
- JE = Junior exempt
- JR = Junior Accelerator Programme entrant
- CO = College Accelerator Programme entrant
- NG = Next Gen Accelerator Program entrant
- w/o = Walkover
- r = Retired
- d = Defaulted

=== Finals ===
Semifinals
WC	(United States) Taylor Townsend (United States) Donald Young	6	6
8	(Indonesia) Aldila Sutjiadi (India) Rohan Bopanna	3	4
3	(Italy) Sara Errani (Italy) Andrea Vavassori	6	7
WC	(United States) Tyra Caterina Grant (United States) Aleksandar Kovacevic	3	5

Final
WC	(United States) Taylor Townsend (United States) Donald Young	6^{0}	5
3	(Italy) Sara Errani (Italy) Andrea Vavassori	7^{7}	7

=== Top half ===
First round
1	(Canada) G Dabrowski (United Kingdom) J Salisbury	6	6^{5}	[8]
(Kazakhstan) A Danilina (Finland) H Heliövaara	4	7^{7}	[10]
(China) S Zhang (El Salvador) M Arévalo	6	3	[8]
(Spain) C Bucșa (Belgium) J Vliegen	3	6	[10]
WC	(United States) T Townsend (United States) D Young	7	6
(United States) A Muhammad (Argentina) A Molteni	5	0
(Ukraine) N Kichenok (Monaco) H Nys	6^{8}	7^{7}	[11]
6	(United States) N Melichar-Martinez (Croatia) I Dodig	7^{10}	6^{5}	[9]
4	(Czech Republic) B Krejčíková (Australia) M Ebden	6	6
(Chinese Taipei) H-c Chan (United States) A Krajicek	2	2
WC	(United States) I Jovic (United States) K Bigun	6	6
(Ukraine) D Yastremska (Australia) M Purcell	4	4
(Brazil) L Stefani (Brazil) R Matos	2	1
(Czech Republic) K Siniaková (Australia) J Peers	6	6
(Netherlands) D Schuurs (Germany) T Pütz	6^{7}	6^{5}
8	(Indonesia) A Sutjiadi (India) R Bopanna	7^{9}	7^{7}

Second round
(Kazakhstan) A Danilina (Finland) H Heliövaara	4	6	[10]
(Spain) C Bucșa (Belgium) J Vliegen	6	3	[8]
WC	(United States) T Townsend (United States) D Young	7	6
(Ukraine) N Kichenok (Monaco) H Nys	5	4
4	(Czech Republic) B Krejčíková (Australia) M Ebden	6	6
WC	(United States) I Jovic (United States) K Bigun	2	3
(Czech Republic) K Siniaková (Australia) J Peers	6	6^{5}	[7]
8	(Indonesia) A Sutjiadi (India) R Bopanna	0	7^{7}	[10]

Quarterfinals
(Kazakhstan) A Danilina (Finland) H Heliövaara	7^{7}	3	[8]
WC	(United States) T Townsend (United States) D Young	6^{3}	6	[10]
4	(Czech Republic) B Krejčíková (Australia) M Ebden	6^{4}	6	[8]
8	(Indonesia) A Sutjiadi (India) R Bopanna	7^{7}	2	[10]

Semifinals
WC	(United States) T Townsend (United States) D Young	6	6
8	(Indonesia) A Sutjiadi (India) R Bopanna	3	4

=== Bottom half ===
First round
7	(Chinese Taipei) S-w Hsieh (Poland) J Zieliński	6	6
Alt	(Norway) U Eikeri (Argentina) M González	2	3
(Mexico) G Olmos (Mexico) S González	7^{7}	6
(Spain) P Badosa (Greece) S Tsitsipas	6^{3}	4
Alt	A Panova (France) F Martin	4	6	[8]
WC	(United States) M Mateas (United States) M McDonald	6	2	[10]
WC	(United States) S Rogers (United States) R Galloway	6	3	[9]
3	(Italy) S Errani (Italy) A Vavassori	2	6	[11]
5	(United States) D Krawczyk (United Kingdom) N Skupski	3	5
WC	(United States) A Krueger (United States) T-S Kwiatkowski	6	7
(Ukraine) L Kichenok (France) S Doumbia	7	6^{8}	[3]
(Australia) E Perez (Belgium) S Gillé	5	7^{10}	[10]
WC	(United States) TC Grant (United States) A Kovacevic	6	6
WC	(United States) C Ngounoue (United States) L Tien	3	4
WC	(United States) A Parks (United States) J Withrow	6	6
2	(New Zealand) E Routliffe (New Zealand) M Venus	4	4

Second round
7	(Chinese Taipei) S-w Hsieh (Poland) J Zieliński	6^{4}	6	[10]
(Mexico) G Olmos (Mexico) S González	7^{7}	4	[6]
WC	(United States) M Mateas (United States) M McDonald	2	3
3	(Italy) S Errani (Italy) A Vavassori	6	6
WC	(United States) A Krueger (United States) T-S Kwiatkowski	4	7^{7}	[3]
(Australia) E Perez (Belgium) S Gillé	6	6^{4}	[10]
WC	(United States) TC Grant (United States) A Kovacevic	4	6	[11]
WC	(United States) A Parks (United States) J Withrow	6	3	[9]

Quarterfinals
7	(Chinese Taipei) S-w Hsieh (Poland) J Zieliński	3	4
3	(Italy) S Errani (Italy) A Vavassori	6	6
(Australia) E Perez (Belgium) S Gillé
WC	(United States) TC Grant (United States) A Kovacevic	w/o

Semifinals
3	(Italy) S Errani (Italy) A Vavassori	6	7
WC	(United States) TC Grant (United States) A Kovacevic	3	5

== Other entry information ==
=== Wild cards ===
- (United States) Tyra Caterina Grant / (United States) Aleksandar Kovacevic
- (United States) Iva Jovic / (United States) Kaylan Bigun
- (United States) Ashlyn Krueger / (United States) Thai-Son Kwiatkowski
- (United States) Maria Mateas / (United States) Mackenzie McDonald
- (United States) Clervie Ngounoue / (United States) Learner Tien
- (United States) Alycia Parks / (United States) Jackson Withrow
- (United States) Shelby Rogers / (United States) Robert Galloway
- (United States) Taylor Townsend / (United States) Donald Young

=== Alternates ===
- (Norway) Ulrikke Eikeri / (Argentina) Máximo González
- Alexandra Panova / (France) Fabrice Martin

=== Withdrawals ===
- (United States) Bethanie Mattek-Sands / (United Kingdom) Jamie Murray → replaced by Alexandra Panova / (France) Fabrice Martin
- (United States) Katie Volynets / (United States) Rajeev Ram → replaced by (Norway) Ulrikke Eikeri / (Argentina) Máximo González
