= Cooper Woestendick =

American tennis player (born 2006)

- Country (sports): United States
- Born: November 16, 2006 (age 19)
- Prize money: US $39,787

Singles
- Career record: 0–0 (at ATP Tour level, Grand Slam level, and in Davis Cup)
- Career titles: 0
- Highest ranking: No. 975 (August 4, 2025)
- Current ranking: No. 2,011 (August 10, 2026)

Doubles
- Career record: 1–1 (at ATP Tour level, Grand Slam level, and in Davis Cup)
- Career titles: 0
- Highest ranking: No. 441 (September 8, 2025)
- Current ranking: No. 503 (August 10, 2026)

Grand Slam doubles results
- US Open: 2R (2025)
- Last updated on: August 21, 2026.

Cooper Woestendick (born November 16, 2006) is an American professional tennis player. He has a career-high ATP singles ranking of No. 975, achieved on August 4, 2025 and a best doubles ranking of. No. 441, reached on September 8, 2025.

Woestendick won the boys' doubles event at the 2024 Australian Open, with Maxwell Exsted.

Woestendick played the young Andy Roddick in the 2026 movie The Dink.

== Early life ==
Woestendick was born in Topeka, Kansas but raised in Olathe, to parents Dan Woestendick and Kristi (née Lewis) Woestendick.

== Junior career ==
Woestendick won the inaugural International Junior Championships held at the site of the famed BNP Paribas Open in Indian Wells in March 2023 defeating Oliver Bonding, Keegan Rice and Roy Horovitz on his route to the title.

Woestendick also had good results on ITF junior circuit. He won the Traralgon Junior International doubles competition alongside compatriot Maxwell Exsted in January 2024. The pair reached the final of the junior doubles at the 2024 Australian Open with a three-set win over the top seeds Federico Cinà and Rei Sakamoto. In the final they overcame Viktor Frydrych and Petr Brunclik to win the title.

As a result, Woestendick reached an ITF combined ranking of No. 12 on 12 February 2024.

== Professional career ==
In April 2024, Woestendick won his first pro title, a Futures level event in doubles, at the M15 Vero Beach, Florida, with Alexander Razeghi.

Awarded a wildcard alongside compatriot Maxwell Exsted to the men's doubles at the 2025 US Open, they caused a huge upset, with a victory against experienced players David Goffin and Alexandre Müller in the first round. In the second round, they were defeated in three sets by the British pair and sixth seeds Joe Salisbury and Neal Skupski.

== Personal life ==
Woestendick is the grandson of Delvy Lewis, an alumnus and notable basketball player of the University of Kansas.

His parents, Dan and Kristi, played tennis and basketball at the Washburn University, respectively.

== ITF World Tennis Tour finals ==
=== Doubles: 2 (2 titles) ===
Legend ITF WTT (2–0)

Result	W–L	Date	Tournament	Tier	Surface	Partner	Opponents	Score
Win	1–0	Apr 2024	M15 Vero Beach, US	WTT	Clay	(United States) Alexander Razeghi	(United States) Alex Jones (United States) Miles Jones	6–4, 4–6, [10–3]
Win	2–0	Jun 2025	M25 Laval, Canada	WTT	Hard	(Canada) Duncan Chan	(United States) Alafia Ayeni (Australia) Ethan Cook	7–6^{(7–5)}, 6–0

== Junior Grand Slam finals ==
=== Doubles: 1 (title) ===
Result	Year	Tournament	Surface	Partner	Opponents	Score
Win	2024	Australian Open	Hard	(United States) Maxwell Exsted	(Czech Republic) Petr Brunclík (United Kingdom) Viktor Frydrych	6–3, 7–5
