= 2024 US Open (tennis) =

- Date: August 26 – September 8
- Edition: 144th
- Category: Grand Slam (ITF)
- Draw: 128S/64D
- Prize money: $75 million
- Surface: Hard
- Location: New York City, United States
- Venue: USTA Billie Jean King National Tennis Center

Champions

Men's singles
- (Italy) Jannik Sinner

Women's singles
- Aryna Sabalenka

Men's doubles
- (Australia) Max Purcell / (Australia) Jordan Thompson

Women's doubles
- (Ukraine) Lyudmyla Kichenok / (Latvia) Jeļena Ostapenko

Mixed doubles
- (Italy) Sara Errani / (Italy) Andrea Vavassori

Boys' singles
- (Spain) Rafael Jódar

Girls' singles
- (United Kingdom) Mika Stojsavljevic

Boys' doubles
- (Czech Republic) Maxim Mrva / (Japan) Rei Sakamoto

Girls' doubles
- (Morocco) Malak El Allami / (Norway) Emily Sartz-Lunde

Wheelchair boys' singles
- (United States) Charlie Cooper

Wheelchair girls' singles
- (Japan) Yuma Takamuro

Wheelchair boys' doubles
- (Netherlands) Ivar van Rijt / (Australia) Benjamin Wenzel

Wheelchair girls' doubles
- (Japan) Rio Okano / (Japan) Yuma Takamuro
- US Open

The 2024 US Open was the 144th edition of tennis's US Open and the fourth and final Grand Slam event of the year. It was held on outdoor hard courts at the USTA Billie Jean King National Tennis Center in New York City. Novak Djokovic and Coco Gauff were the men's and women's singles defending champions, respectively, but Djokovic lost in the third round to Alexei Popyrin and Gauff lost in the fourth round to Emma Navarro.

It was the final edition of the tournament to commence with 14 days.

== Tournament ==
The tournament was an event run by the International Tennis Federation (ITF) and is part of the 2024 ATP Tour and the 2024 WTA Tour calendars under the Grand Slam category. The tournament was played on hard courts and took place over a series of 17 courts with Laykold surface, including the three existing main showcourts—Arthur Ashe Stadium, Louis Armstrong Stadium and Grandstand.

The wheelchair professional events were not held this year due to scheduling conflicts with the Paris 2024 Paralympic Games, only a junior event was held.

The motto of the tournament was Celebrating the Power of Tennis, chosen by the tournament organizers to encourage “the benefits of the healthiest sport in the world.”

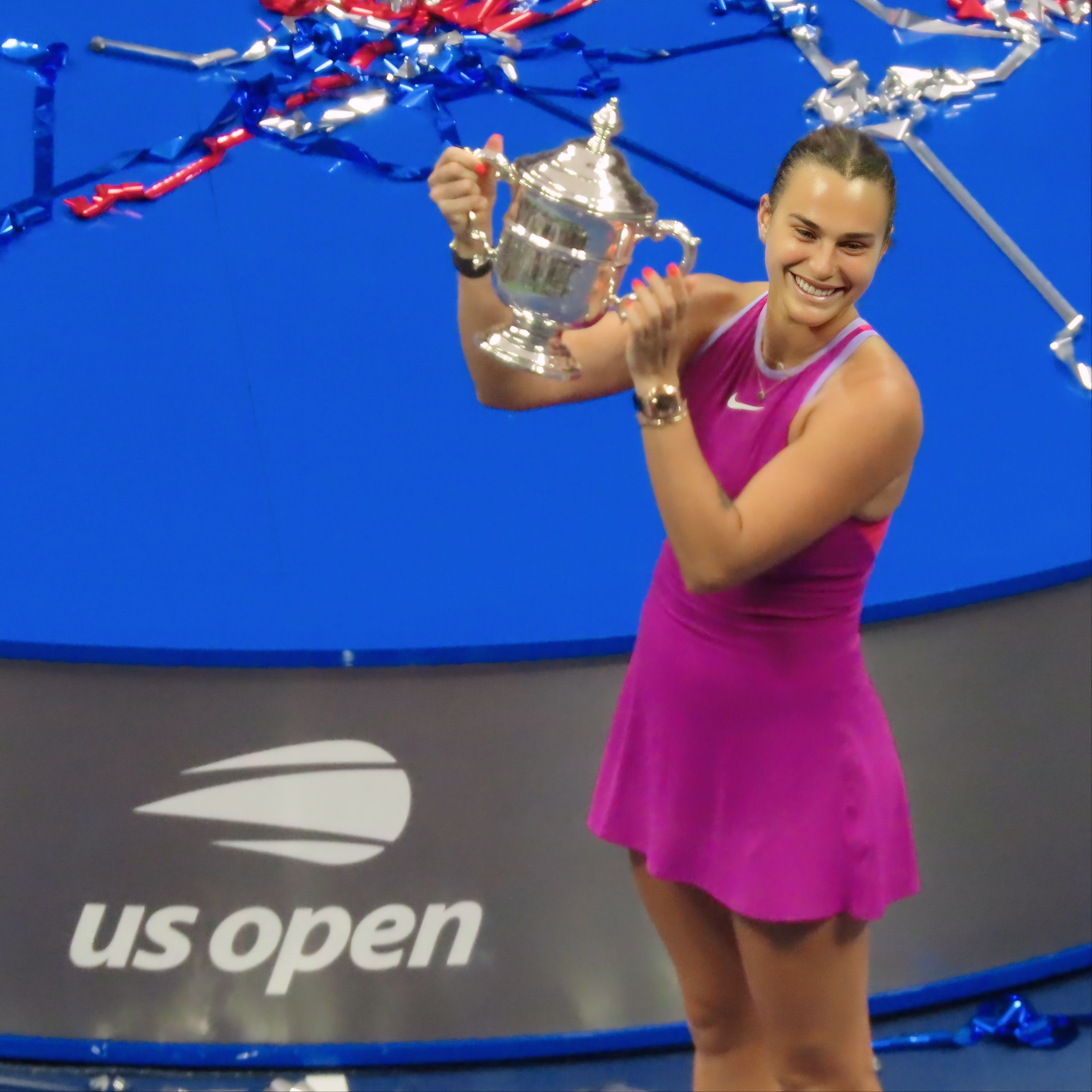
Sabalenka lifting the 2024 US Open woman's singles trophy

== Broadcast ==
In the United States, the 2024 US Open was the tenth year in a row under an 11-year, $825 million contract with ESPN, in which the broadcaster holds exclusive rights to the entire tournament and the US Open Series.

== Singles players ==
- Men's singles

Champion		Runner-up	
(Italy) Jannik Sinner [1]		(United States) Taylor Fritz [12]	
Semifinals out
(United Kingdom) Jack Draper [25]		(United States) Frances Tiafoe [20]	
Quarterfinals out
Daniil Medvedev [5]	(Australia) Alex de Minaur [10]	(Germany) Alexander Zverev [4]	(Bulgaria) Grigor Dimitrov [9]
4th round out
(United States) Tommy Paul [14]	(Portugal) Nuno Borges	(Czech Republic) Tomáš Macháč	(Australia) Jordan Thompson
(Norway) Casper Ruud [8]	(United States) Brandon Nakashima	Andrey Rublev [6]	(Australia) Alexei Popyrin [28]
3rd round out
(Australia) Christopher O'Connell	(Canada) Gabriel Diallo (Q)	(Czech Republic) Jakub Menšík	(Italy) Flavio Cobolli [31]
(Netherlands) Botic van de Zandschulp	(Belgium) David Goffin	(United Kingdom) Dan Evans	(Italy) Matteo Arnaldi [30]
(China) Shang Juncheng	(Argentina) Francisco Comesaña	(Italy) Lorenzo Musetti [18]	(Argentina) Tomás Martín Etcheverry
(Czech Republic) Jiří Lehečka [32]	(Netherlands) Tallon Griekspoor	(United States) Ben Shelton [13]	(Serbia) Novak Djokovic [2]
2nd round out
(United States) Alex Michelsen	(Italy) Mattia Bellucci (Q)	(France) Arthur Fils [24]	(Australia) Max Purcell
(Australia) Thanasi Kokkinakis	(Australia) Tristan Schoolkate (WC)	(Belgium) Zizou Bergs	(Hungary) Fábián Marozsán
(Spain) Carlos Alcaraz [3]	(Argentina) Facundo Díaz Acosta	(France) Adrian Mannarino	(United States) Sebastian Korda [16]
(Finland) Otto Virtanen (Q)	(Argentina) Mariano Navone	Roman Safiullin	(Poland) Hubert Hurkacz [7]
(France) Gaël Monfils	(Spain) Roberto Carballés Baena	(France) Ugo Humbert [17]	(Italy) Matteo Berrettini
(France) Arthur Cazaux	(Serbia) Miomir Kecmanović	(Argentina) Francisco Cerúndolo [29]	(France) Alexandre Müller (WC)
(France) Arthur Rinderknech	(United States) Mitchell Krueger (Q)	(Argentina) Sebastián Báez [21]	(Australia) Rinky Hijikata
(Spain) Roberto Bautista Agut	(Kazakhstan) Alexander Shevchenko	(Spain) Pedro Martínez	(Serbia) Laslo Djere
1st round out
(United States) Mackenzie McDonald	(United States) Eliot Spizzirri (Q)	(Switzerland) Stan Wawrinka (WC)	(Chile) Nicolás Jarry [26]
(United States) Learner Tien (WC)	(Spain) Jaume Munar	(Australia) Aleksandar Vukic	(Italy) Lorenzo Sonego
(Greece) Stefanos Tsitsipas [11]	(Argentina) Federico Coria	(Japan) Taro Daniel	(Canada) Félix Auger-Aliassime [19]
(Australia) James Duckworth	Pavel Kotov	(Serbia) Hamad Medjedovic (Q)	(Serbia) Dušan Lajović
(Australia) Li Tu (Q)	(Canada) Denis Shapovalov (PR)	(France) Hugo Gaston	(China) Zhang Zhizhen
(Chile) Alejandro Tabilo [22]	(Croatia) Borna Ćorić	(Italy) Fabio Fognini	(France) Corentin Moutet
(United States) Marcos Giron	(France) Quentin Halys (Q)	(Germany) Daniel Altmaier	Karen Khachanov [23]
(United States) Zachary Svajda (WC)	(United States) Matthew Forbes (WC)	(France) Constant Lestienne	(Kazakhstan) Timofey Skatov (Q)
(China) Bu Yunchaokete (Q)	(Argentina) Diego Schwartzman (Q)	(United Kingdom) Jan Choinski (Q)	(Kazakhstan) Alexander Bublik [27]
(Brazil) Thiago Monteiro	(Switzerland) Dominic Stricker (PR)	(Spain) Albert Ramos Viñolas	(Argentina) Camilo Ugo Carabelli
(Denmark) Holger Rune [15]	(Spain) Pablo Carreño Busta (PR)	(Japan) Yoshihito Nishioka	(United States) Reilly Opelka (PR)
(Austria) Sebastian Ofner	(France) Giovanni Mpetshi Perricard	(Australia) Adam Walton	(Germany) Maximilian Marterer (LL)
(Brazil) Thiago Seyboth Wild	(United States) Christopher Eubanks (WC)	(France) Hugo Grenier (Q)	(Hungary) Márton Fucsovics
(Italy) Luciano Darderi	(India) Sumit Nagal	(Spain) Alejandro Davidovich Fokina	(France) Kyrian Jacquet (Q)
(Austria) Dominic Thiem (WC)	(Italy) Luca Nardi	(Germany) Dominik Koepfer	(United States) Aleksandar Kovacevic
(South Korea) Kwon Soon-woo (PR)	(Poland) Maks Kaśnikowski (Q)	(Germany) Jan-Lennard Struff	(Moldova) Radu Albot (Q)

- Women's singles

Champion		Runner-up	
Aryna Sabalenka [2]		(United States) Jessica Pegula [6]	
Semifinals out
(Czech Republic) Karolína Muchová		(United States) Emma Navarro [13]	
Quarterfinals out
(Poland) Iga Świątek [1]	(Brazil) Beatriz Haddad Maia [22]	(Spain) Paula Badosa [26]	(China) Zheng Qinwen [7]
4th round out
Liudmila Samsonova [16]	Diana Shnaider [18]	(Denmark) Caroline Wozniacki	(Italy) Jasmine Paolini [5]
(China) Wang Yafan	(United States) Coco Gauff [3]	(Croatia) Donna Vekić [24]	(Belgium) Elise Mertens [33]
3rd round out
Anastasia Pavlyuchenkova [25]	(United States) Ashlyn Krueger	(Italy) Sara Errani	(Spain) Jéssica Bouzas Maneiro
(France) Jessika Ponchet (Q)	Anna Kalinskaya [15]	Anastasia Potapova	(Kazakhstan) Yulia Putintseva [30]
(Romania) Elena-Gabriela Ruse (Q)	Victoria Azarenka [20]	(Ukraine) Marta Kostyuk [19]	(Ukraine) Elina Svitolina [27]
(Germany) Jule Niemeier	(United States) Peyton Stearns	(United States) Madison Keys [14]	Ekaterina Alexandrova [29]
2nd round out
(Japan) Ena Shibahara (Q)	(Italy) Elisabetta Cocciaretto	Mirra Andreeva [21]	(Czech Republic) Marie Bouzková
(United States) Caroline Dolehide	(Denmark) Clara Tauson	(United Kingdom) Katie Boulter [31]	(United States) Sofia Kenin
(Kazakhstan) Elena Rybakina [4]	(Mexico) Renata Zarazúa	(Spain) Sara Sorribes Tormo	(Hungary) Anna Bondár
(Japan) Naomi Osaka (WC)	(United States) Varvara Lepchenko (Q)	(China) Wang Xinyu	(Czech Republic) Karolína Plíšková
(Czech Republic) Barbora Krejčíková [8]	(United States) Taylor Townsend	(France) Clara Burel	(France) Diane Parry
(Netherlands) Arantxa Rus	(United Kingdom) Harriet Dart	(Ukraine) Anhelina Kalinina	(Germany) Tatjana Maria
Erika Andreeva	(Japan) Moyuka Uchijima	(Belgium) Greet Minnen	Daria Kasatkina [12]
(Australia) Maya Joint (Q)	(Australia) Ajla Tomljanović (PR)	(United States) Iva Jovic (WC)	(Italy) Lucia Bronzetti
1st round out
Kamilla Rakhimova (LL)	(Australia) Daria Saville	(Ukraine) Kateryna Baindl (PR)	(Australia) Taylah Preston (WC)
(Colombia) Camila Osorio	(China) Zhang Shuai (PR)	(Germany) Eva Lys (Q)	(China) Wang Qiang (PR)
(United States) Danielle Collins [11]	(Spain) Cristina Bucșa	(Slovakia) Anna Karolína Schmiedlová	(Argentina) Nadia Podoroska
Aliaksandra Sasnovich (Q)	(Croatia) Petra Martić	(United Kingdom) Emma Raducanu	(United States) Shelby Rogers (PR)
(Australia) Destanee Aiava (Q)	(China) Zheng Saisai (PR)	(Japan) Nao Hibino (Q)	(France) Caroline Garcia [28]
(Armenia) Elina Avanesyan	(United States) Alexa Noel (WC)	(United States) Bernarda Pera	(United States) Lauren Davis (PR)
(Latvia) Jeļena Ostapenko [10]	(United States) Katie Volynets	(Czech Republic) Brenda Fruhvirtová	(Canada) Leylah Fernandez [23]
(Czech Republic) Linda Nosková	(Australia) Arina Rodionova (Q)	(Egypt) Mayar Sherif	(Canada) Bianca Andreescu (WC)
(Spain) Marina Bassols Ribera (Q)	(Austria) Julia Grabher (PR)	(Italy) Martina Trevisan	(Switzerland) Viktorija Golubic
(Ukraine) Yuliia Starodubtseva (Q)	(United States) Sloane Stephens	(China) Wang Xiyu	(Greece) Maria Sakkari [9]
Anna Blinkova	(Romania) Ana Bogdan	(France) Chloé Paquet (WC)	(United States) McCartney Kessler (WC)
(Argentina) María Lourdes Carlé	(France) Océane Dodin	(Argentina) Solana Sierra (Q)	(France) Varvara Gracheva
(United States) Amanda Anisimova (WC)	(China) Yuan Yue	(Germany) Tamara Korpatsch	(Ukraine) Dayana Yastremska [32]
(Australia) Kimberly Birrell (Q)	(Poland) Magdalena Fręch	(Ukraine) Lesia Tsurenko	(Romania) Jaqueline Cristian
(Czech Republic) Kateřina Siniaková	(Germany) Laura Siegemund	(United States) Ann Li (Q)	Veronika Kudermetova
(Bulgaria) Viktoriya Tomova	(Poland) Magda Linette	(New Zealand) Lulu Sun	(Australia) Priscilla Hon (Q)

== Events ==
=== Men's singles ===
- (Italy) Jannik Sinner def. (United States) Taylor Fritz, 6–3, 6–4, 7–5

=== Women's singles ===
- Aryna Sabalenka def. (United States) Jessica Pegula, 7–5, 7–5

=== Men's doubles ===
- (Australia) Max Purcell / (Australia) Jordan Thompson def. (Germany) Kevin Krawietz / (Germany) Tim Pütz, 6–4, 7–6^{(7–4)}

=== Women's doubles ===
- (Ukraine) Lyudmyla Kichenok / (Latvia) Jeļena Ostapenko def. (France) Kristina Mladenovic / (China) Zhang Shuai, 6–4, 6–3

=== Mixed doubles ===
- (Italy) Sara Errani / (Italy) Andrea Vavassori def. (United States) Taylor Townsend / (United States) Donald Young, 7–6^{(7–0)}, 7–5

=== Boys' singles ===
- (Spain) Rafael Jódar def. (Norway) Nicolai Budkov Kjær, 2–6, 6–2, 7–6^{(10–1)}

=== Girls' singles ===
- (United Kingdom) Mika Stojsavljevic def. (Japan) Wakana Sonobe, 6–4, 6–4

=== Boys' doubles ===
- (Czech Republic) Maxim Mrva / (Japan) Rei Sakamoto def. (Czech Republic) Denis Peták / (Switzerland) Flynn Thomas, 7–5, 7–6^{(7–1)}

=== Girls' doubles ===
- (Morocco) Malak El Allami / (Norway) Emily Sartz-Lunde def. (Czech Republic) Julie Paštiková / (Germany) Julia Stusek, 6–2, 4–6, [10–6]

=== Wheelchair boys' singles ===
- (United States) Charlie Cooper def. (Netherlands) Ivar van Rijt, 7–6^{(7–2)}, 6–3

=== Wheelchair girls' singles ===
- (Japan) Yuma Takamuro def. (Brazil) Vitória Miranda, 2–6, 6–4, 6–4

=== Wheelchair boys' doubles ===
- (Netherlands) Ivar van Rijt / (Australia) Benjamin Wenzel def. (United States) Charlie Cooper / (United States) Tomas Majetic, 6–2, 6–1

=== Wheelchair girls' doubles ===
- (Japan) Rio Okano / (Japan) Yuma Takamuro def. (Belgium) Luna Gryp / (Brazil) Vitória Miranda, 6–3, 6–2

== Point and prize money distribution ==
=== Point distribution ===
Event	W	F	SF	QF	Round of 16	Round of 32	Round of 64	Round of 128	Q	Q3	Q2	Q1
Men's singles	2000	1300	800	400	200	100	50	10	30	16	8	0
Men's doubles	2000	1200	720	360	180	90	0	N/A				
Women's singles	2000	1300	780	430	240	130	70	10	40	30	20	2
Women's doubles	2000	1300	780	430	240	130	10	N/A				

=== Prize money ===
The total overall prize money for the 2024 US Open totals $75 million, 15% more than the 2023 edition.

Event	W	F	SF	QF	Round of 16	Round of 32	Round of 64	Round of 128	Q3	Q2	Q1
Singles	$3,600,000	$1,800,000	$1,000,000	$530,000	$325,000	$215,000	$140,000	$100,000	$52,000	$38,000	$25,000
Doubles*	$750,000	$375,000	$190,000	$110,000	$63,000	$40,000	$25,000	N/A	N/A	N/A	N/A
Mixed Doubles*	$200,000	$100,000	$50,000	$27,500	$16,500	$10,000	N/A	N/A	N/A	N/A	N/A

* per team

Preceded by 2024 Wimbledon Championships	Grand Slams	Succeeded by 2025 Australian Open
