= 2026 ITF Women's World Tennis Tour (October–December) =

The 2026 ITF Women's World Tennis Tour is the 2026 edition of the second-tier tour for women's professional tennis. It is organised by the International Tennis Federation and is a tier below the WTA Tour. The ITF Women's World Tennis Tour includes tournaments in five categories with prize money ranging from $15,000 up to $100,000.

== Key ==
Category
W100 tournaments ($100,000)
W75 tournaments ($60,000)
W50 tournaments ($40,000)
W35 tournaments ($30,000)
W15 tournaments ($15,000)

=== October ===
Week of	Tournament	Winner	Runners-up	Semifinalists	Quarterfinalists
October 5	Burgas, Bulgaria; Clay; W50; Singles and doubles draws	(Spain) Ane Mintegi del Olmo; 5–7, 6–4, 6–0	(Ukraine) Anastasiia Sobolieva	(Czech Republic) Alena Kovačková (Bulgaria) Rositsa Dencheva	(Germany) Sonja Zhenikhova (Argentina) Luisina Giovannini (Bulgaria) Iva Ivanova (Argentina) Jazmín Ortenzi
October 5	Burgas, Bulgaria; Clay; W50; Singles and doubles draws	(Czech Republic) Alena Kovačková (Czech Republic) Jana Kovačková; 6–4, 7–5	(Romania) Maia Ilinca Burcescu (Germany) Sonja Zhenikhova	(Czech Republic) Alena Kovačková (Bulgaria) Rositsa Dencheva	(Germany) Sonja Zhenikhova (Argentina) Luisina Giovannini (Bulgaria) Iva Ivanova (Argentina) Jazmín Ortenzi
October 5	Heraklion, Greece; Clay; W50; Singles and doubles draws	(Czech Republic) Alisa Oktiabreva; 7–5, 6–1	(Turkey) İpek Öz	(France) Alice Tubello (Italy) Nuria Brancaccio	(Italy) Jessica Bertoldo (Greece) Martha Matoula (Malta) Francesca Curmi (Italy) Jennifer Ruggeri
October 5	Heraklion, Greece; Clay; W50; Singles and doubles draws	(Italy) Nuria Brancaccio (Greece) Despina Papamichail; Walkover	(Armenia) Ani Amiraghyan; Elina Nepliy	(France) Alice Tubello (Italy) Nuria Brancaccio	(Italy) Jessica Bertoldo (Greece) Martha Matoula (Malta) Francesca Curmi (Italy) Jennifer Ruggeri
October 5	Lexington, United States; Hard; W50; Singles and doubles draws	(Australia) Astra Sharma; 6–2, 6–1	(United States) Kaitlyn Carnicella	(United States) Madison Brengle (Netherlands) Arantxa Rus	(United States) Lea Ma (Sweden) Bella Bergqvist Larsson (United States) Whitney Osuigwe (Peru) Lucciana Pérez Alarcón
October 5	Lexington, United States; Hard; W50; Singles and doubles draws	(Morocco) Diae El Jardi (India) Sahaja Yamalapalli; 2–6, 7–5, [12–10]	(United States) Dalayna Hewitt (Ukraine) Valeriya Strakhova	(United States) Madison Brengle (Netherlands) Arantxa Rus	(United States) Lea Ma (Sweden) Bella Bergqvist Larsson (United States) Whitney Osuigwe (Peru) Lucciana Pérez Alarcón
October 5	Wagga Wagga, Australia; Hard; W35; Singles and doubles draws	(Japan) Ena Shibahara; 6–2, 6–3	(Japan) Naho Sato	(Japan) Himari Satō (Chinese Taipei) Wan I-wen	(Japan) Haruka Kaji (Japan) Yuno Kitahara (Japan) Haruna Arakawa (Japan) Mutsumi Uemura
October 5	Wagga Wagga, Australia; Hard; W35; Singles and doubles draws	(Japan) Haruna Arakawa (Japan) Sera Nishimoto; 6–4, 6–2	(Australia) Amy Stevens (Australia) Belle Thompson	(Japan) Himari Satō (Chinese Taipei) Wan I-wen	(Japan) Haruka Kaji (Japan) Yuno Kitahara (Japan) Haruna Arakawa (Japan) Mutsumi Uemura
October 5	Lagos, Portugal; Hard; W35; Singles and doubles draws	(India) Maaya Rajeshwaran; 6–4, 6–2	(Spain) Celia Cerviño Ruiz	(Netherlands) Britt du Pree (Ukraine) Yelyzaveta Kotliar	(China) Tian Jialin (Spain) Maria Martínez Vaquero (Portugal) Angelina Voloshchuk; Arina Arifullina
October 5	Lagos, Portugal; Hard; W35; Singles and doubles draws	(Ukraine) Yelyzaveta Kotliar (India) Maaya Rajeshwaran; 0–6, 6–2, [10–7]	(China) Liu Min (Italy) Carlotta Moccia	(Netherlands) Britt du Pree (Ukraine) Yelyzaveta Kotliar	(China) Tian Jialin (Spain) Maria Martínez Vaquero (Portugal) Angelina Voloshchuk; Arina Arifullina
October 5	Seville, Spain; Clay; W35; Singles and doubles draws	(Sweden) Caijsa Hennemann; 6–2, 6–1	(Spain) Ruth Roura Llaverías	(Spain) María García Cid (Italy) Aurora Zantedeschi	(France) Lucie Nguyen Tan (Morocco) Yasmine Kabbaj (Switzerland) Katerina Tsygourova (Spain) Lucía Cortez Llorca
October 5	Seville, Spain; Clay; W35; Singles and doubles draws	(France) Marie Mattel (France) Lucie Nguyen Tan; 6–4, 3–6, [10–6]	(Morocco) Yasmine Kabbaj (Switzerland) Katerina Tsygourova	(Spain) María García Cid (Italy) Aurora Zantedeschi	(France) Lucie Nguyen Tan (Morocco) Yasmine Kabbaj (Switzerland) Katerina Tsygourova (Spain) Lucía Cortez Llorca
October 5	Villeneuve-d'Ascq, France; Hard (i); W35; Singles and doubles draws	(France) Emma Léné; 6–3, 5–7, 6–3	(France) Amandine Monnot	(Germany) Mariella Thamm (Belgium) Jana Otzipka	(France) Sarah Iliev (Netherlands) Stéphanie Visscher (Lithuania) Andrė Lukošiūtė (France) Océane Dodin
October 5	Villeneuve-d'Ascq, France; Hard (i); W35; Singles and doubles draws	(United States) Jaeda Daniel (Burundi) Sada Nahimana; 6–3, 6–2	(South Korea) Im Hee-rae (South Korea) Kim Eun-chae	(Germany) Mariella Thamm (Belgium) Jana Otzipka	(France) Sarah Iliev (Netherlands) Stéphanie Visscher (Lithuania) Andrė Lukošiūtė (France) Océane Dodin
October 5	Santa Margherita di Pula, Italy; Clay; W35; Singles and doubles draws	(Germany) Joëlle Steur; 7–6^{(7–1)}, 3–6, 7–6^{(7–3)}	(Sweden) Lisa Zaar	(Italy) Alessandra Mazzola (Italy) Jessica Pieri	(Italy) Matilde Paoletti; Maria Andrienko (Italy) Deborah Chiesa (Italy) Eleonora Alvisi
October 5	Santa Margherita di Pula, Italy; Clay; W35; Singles and doubles draws	(Italy) Giorgia Pedone (Sweden) Lisa Zaar; 7–6^{(8–6)}, 6–7^{(3–7)}, [10–4]	(France) Nina Radovanovic (Serbia) Natalija Senić	(Italy) Alessandra Mazzola (Italy) Jessica Pieri	(Italy) Matilde Paoletti; Maria Andrienko (Italy) Deborah Chiesa (Italy) Eleonora Alvisi
October 5	Monastir, Tunisia; Hard; W35; Singles and doubles draws	(France) Tiphanie Lemaître; 6–3, 3–6, 7–6^{(7–2)}	(Poland) Zuzanna Pawlikowska	(Czech Republic) Denisa Žoldáková (Ukraine) Polina Skliar	(Slovakia) Katarína Kužmová (Poland) Weronika Ewald (Italy) Viola Turini (Poland) Amelia Paszun
October 5	Monastir, Tunisia; Hard; W35; Singles and doubles draws	(Czech Republic) Tereza Krejčová (Poland) Amelia Paszun; 6–4, 6–4	(Slovakia) Katarína Kužmová (Poland) Zuzanna Pawlikowska	(Czech Republic) Denisa Žoldáková (Ukraine) Polina Skliar	(Slovakia) Katarína Kužmová (Poland) Weronika Ewald (Italy) Viola Turini (Poland) Amelia Paszun
October 5	Las Vegas, United States; Hard; W35; Singles and doubles draws	(Denmark) Emma Kamper; 7–5, 6–2	(Italy) Francesca Pace	Edda Mamedova (United States) Annika Penickova	(Argentina) Francesca Mattioli (Italy) Diletta Cherubini (United States) Janae Preston (Ecuador) Mell Reasco
October 5	Las Vegas, United States; Hard; W35; Singles and doubles draws	(Italy) Diletta Cherubini (Italy) Francesca Pace; 7–6^{(7–5)}, 7–5	(United States) Abigail Rencheli; Maria Sholokhova	Edda Mamedova (United States) Annika Penickova	(Argentina) Francesca Mattioli (Italy) Diletta Cherubini (United States) Janae Preston (Ecuador) Mell Reasco
October 5	Ma'anshan, China; Hard; W15; Singles and doubles draws	Daria Egorova; 7–5, 6–3	(China) Zhang Junhan	Varvara Panshina (China) Wang Jiaqi	(China) Wang Yuhan (China) Chen Yiru (Chinese Taipei) Lin Fang-an (China) Hou Yanan
October 5	Ma'anshan, China; Hard; W15; Singles and doubles draws	Daria Egorova; Alina Yuneva; 6–7^{(3–7)}, 7–6^{(8–6)}, [10–5]	(China) Lu Jingjing (China) Wang Yuhan	Varvara Panshina (China) Wang Jiaqi	(China) Wang Yuhan (China) Chen Yiru (Chinese Taipei) Lin Fang-an (China) Hou Yanan
October 5	Islamabad, Pakistan; Hard; W15; Singles and doubles draws	(France) Astrid Cirotte; 7–5, 7–5	(Thailand) Kamonwan Yodpetch	(Uzbekistan) Sevil Yuldasheva (South Africa) Wozuko Mdlulwa	Julia Khramtsova (Germany) Anastasiya Kuparev; Ksenia Laskutova (Uzbekistan) Sabrina Olimjanova
October 5	Islamabad, Pakistan; Hard; W15; Singles and doubles draws	(France) Astrid Cirotte (Mexico) Sabastiani León; 5–7, 6–2, [10–5]	(South Korea) Moon Jeong (Thailand) Kamonwan Yodpetch	(Uzbekistan) Sevil Yuldasheva (South Africa) Wozuko Mdlulwa	Julia Khramtsova (Germany) Anastasiya Kuparev; Ksenia Laskutova (Uzbekistan) Sabrina Olimjanova
October 5	Székesfehérvár, Hungary; Clay (i); W15; Singles and doubles draws	(Estonia) Maileen Nuudi; 6–3, 6–2	(Hungary) Lujza Béviz	(Italy) Chiara Fornasieri (Romania) Alesia Breaz	(Slovakia) Anika Jašková (Czech Republic) Brenda Fruhvirtová (Belgium) Lisa Claeys (Serbia) Dušica Popovski
October 5	Székesfehérvár, Hungary; Clay (i); W15; Singles and doubles draws	(Hungary) Greta Fenyves (Hungary) Gréta Nemcsek; 3–6, 6–4, [10–7]	(Germany) Victoria Pohle (Germany) Lorena Schaedel	(Italy) Chiara Fornasieri (Romania) Alesia Breaz	(Slovakia) Anika Jašková (Czech Republic) Brenda Fruhvirtová (Belgium) Lisa Claeys (Serbia) Dušica Popovski
October 5	Chișinău, Moldova; Clay; W15; Singles and doubles draws	Felitsata Dorofeeva-Rybas; 6–2, 6–1	(Norway) Astrid Brune Olsen	(Poland) Zuzanna Bednarz (Italy) Aurora Corvi	(Romania) Andreea Prisăcariu (Switzerland) Sophie Luescher (Romania) Maria Valentina Pop (Germany) Sophia Ksandinov
October 5	Chișinău, Moldova; Clay; W15; Singles and doubles draws	Ekaterina Agureeva; Felitsata Dorofeeva-Rybas; 6–2, 7–5	(Moldova) Lia Belibova (Moldova) Arina Gamretkaia	(Poland) Zuzanna Bednarz (Italy) Aurora Corvi	(Romania) Andreea Prisăcariu (Switzerland) Sophie Luescher (Romania) Maria Valentina Pop (Germany) Sophia Ksandinov
October 5	Sharm El Sheikh, Egypt; Hard; W15; Singles and doubles draws	Yuliya Perapekhina; 7–5, 4–6, 6–4	(Ukraine) Antonina Sushkova	(Bosnia and Herzegovina) Ayline Samardžić (France) Andrea Lola Popovic	(Netherlands) Jinte Eve de Boer (France) Alyssa Réguer (Germany) Anja Wildgruber; Anna Snigireva
October 5	Sharm El Sheikh, Egypt; Hard; W15; Singles and doubles draws	Ustiniya Lekomtseva; Yuliya Perapekhina; 2–6, 7–6^{(9–7)}, [10–5]	(Denmark) Sarafina Olivia Hansen (France) Alyssa Réguer	(Bosnia and Herzegovina) Ayline Samardžić (France) Andrea Lola Popovic	(Netherlands) Jinte Eve de Boer (France) Alyssa Réguer (Germany) Anja Wildgruber; Anna Snigireva
October 5	Cipolletti, Argentina; Hard; W15; Singles and doubles draws	(Paraguay) Leyla Brítez Risso; 6–1, 6–0	(Mexico) Ana Sofía Sánchez	(Argentina) Luciana Moyano (Argentina) Justina González Daniele	(Argentina) Sofía Meabe (Argentina) Sol Ailin Larraya Guidi (Argentina) María Florencia Urrutia (Chile) Fernanda Rain Contreras
October 5	Cipolletti, Argentina; Hard; W15; Singles and doubles draws	(Argentina) Sol Ailin Larraya Guidi (Argentina) Sofía Meabe; Walkover	(Mexico) Ana Sofía Sánchez (Argentina) María Florencia Urrutia	(Argentina) Luciana Moyano (Argentina) Justina González Daniele	(Argentina) Sofía Meabe (Argentina) Sol Ailin Larraya Guidi (Argentina) María Florencia Urrutia (Chile) Fernanda Rain Contreras
October 12	Edmond Open; Edmond, United States; Hard; W100; Singles and doubles draws	(United States) Sloane Stephens; 6–3, 6–2	Kristina Liutova	(United States) Julieta Pareja (Mexico) Renata Zarazúa	(Peru) Dana Guzmán (United States) Kristina Penickova (United States) Akasha Urhobo (South Korea) Ku Yeon-woo
October 12	Edmond Open; Edmond, United States; Hard; W100; Singles and doubles draws	(Spain) Alicia Herrero Liñana (United States) Allura Zamarripa; 6–1, 6–2	(United Kingdom) Sofia Johnson (United States) Malaika Rapolu	(United States) Julieta Pareja (Mexico) Renata Zarazúa	(Peru) Dana Guzmán (United States) Kristina Penickova (United States) Akasha Urhobo (South Korea) Ku Yeon-woo
October 12	Stara Zagora, Bulgaria; Clay; W50; Singles and doubles draws	(Turkey) İpek Öz; 6–2, 7–5	(Czech Republic) Alena Kovačková	(Brazil) Carolina Alves (Czech Republic) Lucie Petruželová	Valeriia Artemeva (Spain) Ángela Fita Boluda (Bulgaria) Iva Ivanova (Argentina) Luisina Giovannini
October 12	Stara Zagora, Bulgaria; Clay; W50; Singles and doubles draws	(Bulgaria) Iva Ivanova (Serbia) Anja Stanković; 4–6, 6–3, [10–6]	(Serbia) Gala Ivanović (Bulgaria) Viktoria Veleva	(Brazil) Carolina Alves (Czech Republic) Lucie Petruželová	Valeriia Artemeva (Spain) Ángela Fita Boluda (Bulgaria) Iva Ivanova (Argentina) Luisina Giovannini
October 12	Quebec City, Canada; Hard (i); W50; Singles and doubles draws	(Sweden) Kajsa Rinaldo Persson; 6–4, 6–2	(United Kingdom) Mimi Xu	(United States) Reese Brantmeier (Canada) Ariana Arseneault	(United States) Thara Gowda (Japan) Sara Saito (Japan) Yuki Naito (United States) Ayana Akli
October 12	Quebec City, Canada; Hard (i); W50; Singles and doubles draws	(United States) Reese Brantmeier (United Kingdom) Mimi Xu; 6–2, 6–7^{(5–7)}, [10–5]	(Canada) Ariana Arseneault (Canada) Raphaëlle Lacasse	(United States) Reese Brantmeier (Canada) Ariana Arseneault	(United States) Thara Gowda (Japan) Sara Saito (Japan) Yuki Naito (United States) Ayana Akli
October 12	Birmingham, United Kingdom; Hard (i); W35; Singles and doubles draws	(United Kingdom) Alicia Dudeney; 6–4, 6–3	(France) Manon Léonard	(France) Jessika Ponchet (United Kingdom) Mika Stojsavljevic	(United Kingdom) Jodie Burrage (Japan) Mayuka Aikawa (France) Océane Dodin (Kenya) Angella Okutoyi
October 12	Birmingham, United Kingdom; Hard (i); W35; Singles and doubles draws	(United Kingdom) Jodie Burrage (Australia) Lizette Cabrera; 6–4, 7–5	(United Kingdom) Victoria Allen (Netherlands) Stéphanie Visscher	(France) Jessika Ponchet (United Kingdom) Mika Stojsavljevic	(United Kingdom) Jodie Burrage (Japan) Mayuka Aikawa (France) Océane Dodin (Kenya) Angella Okutoyi
October 12	Santa Margherita di Pula, Italy; Clay; W35; Singles and doubles draws	(Italy) Jessica Pieri; 6–4, 6–1	(France) Nina Radovanovic	(Latvia) Beatrise Zeltiņa (Greece) Valentini Grammatikopoulou	(Italy) Matilde Paoletti (Sweden) Nellie Taraba Wallberg (Serbia) Natalija Senić (Italy) Angelica Raggi
October 12	Santa Margherita di Pula, Italy; Clay; W35; Singles and doubles draws	(Brazil) Carolina Bohrer Martins (Egypt) Yasmin Ezzat; 3–6, 6–1, [10–4]	(Sweden) Nellie Taraba Wallberg (Latvia) Beatrise Zeltiņa	(Latvia) Beatrise Zeltiņa (Greece) Valentini Grammatikopoulou	(Italy) Matilde Paoletti (Sweden) Nellie Taraba Wallberg (Serbia) Natalija Senić (Italy) Angelica Raggi
October 12	Heraklion, Greece; Clay; W35; Singles and doubles draws	(Czech Republic) Alisa Oktiabreva; 6–7^{(4–7)}, 6–4, 6–2	(Belgium) Tilwith di Girolami	(France) Alice Tubello (Romania) Elena Ruxandra Bertea	(Greece) Elena Korokozidi (Colombia) María Herazo (Romania) Maria Sara Popa (France) Astrid Lew Yan Foon
October 12	Heraklion, Greece; Clay; W35; Singles and doubles draws	(Greece) Elena Korokozidi (Germany) Eva Marie Voracek; 6–3, 3–6, [11–9]	(Colombia) María Herazo (Romania) Simona Ogescu	(France) Alice Tubello (Romania) Elena Ruxandra Bertea	(Greece) Elena Korokozidi (Colombia) María Herazo (Romania) Maria Sara Popa (France) Astrid Lew Yan Foon
October 12	Monastir, Tunisia; Hard; W35; Singles and doubles draws	(Serbia) Elena Milovanović; 6–3, 7–5	(India) Vaishnavi Adkar	(China) Zhu Chenting; Ekaterina Tupitsyna	(Japan) Kayo Nishimura; Anna Kubareva (United States) Sofia Rojas (France) Tiphanie Lemaître
October 12	Monastir, Tunisia; Hard; W35; Singles and doubles draws	(Slovakia) Katarína Kužmová (Serbia) Elena Milovanović; 6–3, 6–2	(United States) Isabella Barrera Aguirre (China) Zhu Chenting	(China) Zhu Chenting; Ekaterina Tupitsyna	(Japan) Kayo Nishimura; Anna Kubareva (United States) Sofia Rojas (France) Tiphanie Lemaître
October 12	Redding, United States; Hard; W35; Singles and doubles draws	(United States) Connie Ma; 7–5, 6–2	(United States) Annika Penickova	(Japan) Nao Nishino (United States) Lea Ma	(United States) Vivian Wolff (Turkey) Duru Söke; Maria Sholokhova (Slovakia) Salma Drugdová
October 12	Redding, United States; Hard; W35; Singles and doubles draws	(United States) Abigail Rencheli; Maria Sholokhova; 2–6, 6–4, [14–12]	(United States) Connie Ma (Spain) Berta Passola	(Japan) Nao Nishino (United States) Lea Ma	(United States) Vivian Wolff (Turkey) Duru Söke; Maria Sholokhova (Slovakia) Salma Drugdová
October 12	Shenzhen, China; Hard; W15; Singles and doubles draws	(China) Wei Sijia; 6–3, 6–4	Darya Khamutsianskaya	(China) Zhang Junhan (China) Yuan Chengyiyi	(Hong Kong) Adithya Karunaratne (China) Huang Yujia; Ekaterina Ovcharenko (United States) Sarah Ye
October 12	Shenzhen, China; Hard; W15; Singles and doubles draws	(China) Han Jiangxue (Hong Kong) Cody Wong; 6–3, 4–6, [10–5]	(China) Zhang Jiale (China) Zheng Wushuang	(China) Zhang Junhan (China) Yuan Chengyiyi	(Hong Kong) Adithya Karunaratne (China) Huang Yujia; Ekaterina Ovcharenko (United States) Sarah Ye
October 12	Islamabad, Pakistan; Hard; W15; Singles and doubles draws	(France) Astrid Cirotte; 3–6, 6–4, 6–2	(Thailand) Kamonwan Yodpetch	(China) Wu Ruxi (South Africa) Wozuko Mdlulwa	Ksenia Laskutova (Czech Republic) Gloria Levinsky (Germany) Anastasiya Kuparev (Netherlands) Florentine Dekkers
October 12	Islamabad, Pakistan; Hard; W15; Singles and doubles draws	(China) Wu Ruxi (Thailand) Kamonwan Yodpetch; 6–3, 4–6, [10–2]	(Germany) Anastasiya Kuparev (Uzbekistan) Sevil Yuldasheva	(China) Wu Ruxi (South Africa) Wozuko Mdlulwa	Ksenia Laskutova (Czech Republic) Gloria Levinsky (Germany) Anastasiya Kuparev (Netherlands) Florentine Dekkers
October 12	Bol, Croatia; Clay; W15; Singles and doubles draws	(Croatia) Tara Würth; 6–4, 6–2	(Germany) Anna Petkovic	(Spain) Didi Bredberg Canizares (Czech Republic) Eliška Ticháčková	(Romania) Alesia Breaz (Armenia) Ani Amiraghyan (Czech Republic) Veronika Sekerková (United States) Anita Tu
October 12	Bol, Croatia; Clay; W15; Singles and doubles draws	(Romania) Alesia Breaz (Romania) Patricia Goina; 7–6^{(7–3)}, 6–4	(Poland) Daria Gorska (Poland) Maja Pawelska	(Spain) Didi Bredberg Canizares (Czech Republic) Eliška Ticháčková	(Romania) Alesia Breaz (Armenia) Ani Amiraghyan (Czech Republic) Veronika Sekerková (United States) Anita Tu
October 12	Chișinău, Moldova; Clay; W15; Singles and doubles draws	Felitsata Dorofeeva-Rybas; 6–2, 6–2	(Romania) Giulia Safina Popa	Kristina Kroitor (Switzerland) Sophie Luescher	(France) Justine Bretnacher (Moldova) Arina Gamretkaia (Romania) Sara Victoria Bălan (Romania) Andreea Prisăcariu
October 12	Chișinău, Moldova; Clay; W15; Singles and doubles draws	Ekaterina Agureeva; Felitsata Dorofeeva-Rybas; 7–5, 6–3	(Moldova) Lia Belibova (Moldova) Arina Gamretkaia	Kristina Kroitor (Switzerland) Sophie Luescher	(France) Justine Bretnacher (Moldova) Arina Gamretkaia (Romania) Sara Victoria Bălan (Romania) Andreea Prisăcariu
October 12	Sharm El Sheikh, Egypt; Hard; W15; Singles and doubles draws	Yuliya Perapekhina; 6–0, 3–6, 6–2	(Egypt) Lamis Alhussein Abdel Aziz	(France) Dune Vaissaud; Ustiniya Lekomtseva	(Finland) Clarissa Blomqvist (Croatia) Karla Popović (Sweden) Iva Marinkovic (Italy) Federica Sacco
October 12	Sharm El Sheikh, Egypt; Hard; W15; Singles and doubles draws	(Italy) Federica Sacco (France) Dune Vaissaud; 3–6, 6–3, [10–7]	(France) Alyssa Réguer (Slovakia) Radka Zelníčková	(France) Dune Vaissaud; Ustiniya Lekomtseva	(Finland) Clarissa Blomqvist (Croatia) Karla Popović (Sweden) Iva Marinkovic (Italy) Federica Sacco
October 12	Maceió, Brazil; Clay (i); W15; Singles and doubles draws	(Chile) Bárbara Gatica; 7–5, 6–0	(Mexico) Ana Sofía Sánchez	(Argentina) Luna María Cinalli (Argentina) Josefina Estévez	(Brazil) Marjorie Souza (Brazil) Júlia Konishi Camargo Silva (Chile) Fernanda Labraña (Argentina) María Urrutia
October 12	Maceió, Brazil; Clay (i); W15; Singles and doubles draws	(Chile) Bárbara Gatica (Brazil) Rebeca Pereira; 6–4, 6–0	(Argentina) Lourdes Ayala (Ecuador) Camila Romero	(Argentina) Luna María Cinalli (Argentina) Josefina Estévez	(Brazil) Marjorie Souza (Brazil) Júlia Konishi Camargo Silva (Chile) Fernanda Labraña (Argentina) María Urrutia
October 19	Wrexham, United Kingdom; Hard (i); W100; Singles and doubles draws	(United Kingdom) Hannah Klugman; 6–2, 6–4	(France) Elsa Jacquemot	(Netherlands) Suzan Lamens (United Kingdom) Jodie Burrage	(United States) Dalayna Hewitt (United Kingdom) Alicia Dudeney (Spain) Marina Bassols Ribera (Slovakia) Rebecca Šramková
October 19	Wrexham, United Kingdom; Hard (i); W100; Singles and doubles draws	(United Kingdom) Freya Christie (United Kingdom) Eden Silva; 6–2, 6–3	(Japan) Hiroko Kuwata (India) Ankita Raina	(Netherlands) Suzan Lamens (United Kingdom) Jodie Burrage	(United States) Dalayna Hewitt (United Kingdom) Alicia Dudeney (Spain) Marina Bassols Ribera (Slovakia) Rebecca Šramková
October 19	Challenger de Saguenay; Saguenay, Canada; Hard (i); W75; Singles and doubles draws	(United States) Reese Brantmeier; 7–6^{(10–8)}, 7–6^{(9–7)}	(Japan) Yuki Naito	(Japan) Hiromi Abe (Canada) Ariana Arseneault	(Germany) Tatjana Maria (Germany) Carolina Kuhl (Japan) Sara Saito (United States) Ayana Akli
October 19	Challenger de Saguenay; Saguenay, Canada; Hard (i); W75; Singles and doubles draws	(United States) Reese Brantmeier (United States) Carson Tanguilig; 6–2, 7–6^{(7–3)}	(Czech Republic) Michaela Bayerlová (Netherlands) Jasmijn Gimbrère	(Japan) Hiromi Abe (Canada) Ariana Arseneault	(Germany) Tatjana Maria (Germany) Carolina Kuhl (Japan) Sara Saito (United States) Ayana Akli
October 19	Cherbourg-en-Cotentin, France; Hard (i); W50; Singles and doubles draws	(France) Harmony Tan; 6–2, 7–6^{(7–3)}	(Ukraine) Katarina Zavatska	(France) Manon Léonard (Georgia (country)) Mariam Bolkvadze	(Ukraine) Veronika Podrez (France) Jessika Ponchet (Portugal) Francisca Jorge (Slovakia) Viktória Hrunčáková
October 19	Cherbourg-en-Cotentin, France; Hard (i); W50; Singles and doubles draws	(Germany) Nastasja Schunk (Germany) Valentina Steiner; 7–6^{(7–2)}, 6–4	(China) Feng Shuo (China) Li Zongyu	(France) Manon Léonard (Georgia (country)) Mariam Bolkvadze	(Ukraine) Veronika Podrez (France) Jessika Ponchet (Portugal) Francisca Jorge (Slovakia) Viktória Hrunčáková
October 19	Austin, United States; Hard; W50; Singles and doubles draws	(United Kingdom) Ella McDonald; 7–5, 6–1	(United States) Madison Brengle	(United States) Elizabeth Mandlik; Anastasia Tikhonova	(United States) Thea Frodin (Czech Republic) Barbora Palicová (South Korea) Ku Yeon-woo (Denmark) Rebecca Munk Mortensen
October 19	Austin, United States; Hard; W50; Singles and doubles draws	(United States) Kylie Collins (United Kingdom) Ella McDonald; 6–0, 6–1	(United States) Ashley Lahey (Canada) Alexandra Vagramov	(United States) Elizabeth Mandlik; Anastasia Tikhonova	(United States) Thea Frodin (Czech Republic) Barbora Palicová (South Korea) Ku Yeon-woo (Denmark) Rebecca Munk Mortensen
October 19	Sydney, Australia; Hard; W35; Singles and doubles draws	(Japan) Hikaru Sato; 2–6, 6–3, 6–4	(Chinese Taipei) Wan I-wen	(Japan) Mio Mushika (India) Vaidehi Chaudhari	(United Kingdom) Naiktha Bains (Chinese Taipei) Yang Ya-yi (Australia) Tahlia Kokkinis (Paraguay) Leyla Brítez Risso
October 19	Sydney, Australia; Hard; W35; Singles and doubles draws	(New Zealand) Monique Barry (Japan) Hikaru Sato; 6–3, 5–7, [10–8]	(Australia) Amy Stevens (Australia) Belle Thompson	(Japan) Mio Mushika (India) Vaidehi Chaudhari	(United Kingdom) Naiktha Bains (Chinese Taipei) Yang Ya-yi (Australia) Tahlia Kokkinis (Paraguay) Leyla Brítez Risso
October 19	Qiandaohu, China; Hard; W35; Singles and doubles draws	Darya Khamutsianskaya; 2–6, 6–2, 6–4	(China) Yao Xinxin	Varvara Panshina; Rada Zolotareva	(China) Zheng Wushuang (China) Han Jiangxue (China) Yang Yidi (China) Zhang Junhan
October 19	Qiandaohu, China; Hard; W35; Singles and doubles draws	(Indonesia) Priska Nugroho (China) Zheng Wushuang; 6–0, 6–7^{(2–7)}, [10–3]	Varvara Panshina; Rada Zolotareva	Varvara Panshina; Rada Zolotareva	(China) Zheng Wushuang (China) Han Jiangxue (China) Yang Yidi (China) Zhang Junhan
October 19	Loulé, Portugal; Hard; W35; Singles and doubles draws	(Italy) Federica Urgesi; 6–2, 6–3	(Spain) Aran Teixidó García	(Italy) Laura Mair (Poland) Weronika Falkowska	(Spain) Ángela Fita Boluda (Switzerland) Sophie Luescher (United Kingdom) Esther Adeshina (Spain) Carmen López Martínez
October 19	Loulé, Portugal; Hard; W35; Singles and doubles draws	(China) Liu Min (Italy) Carlotta Moccia; 6–3, 3–6, [10–8]	(Netherlands) Joy de Zeeuw (Netherlands) Isis Louise van den Broek	(Italy) Laura Mair (Poland) Weronika Falkowska	(Spain) Ángela Fita Boluda (Switzerland) Sophie Luescher (United Kingdom) Esther Adeshina (Spain) Carmen López Martínez
October 19	Santa Margherita di Pula, Italy; Clay; W35; Singles and doubles draws	(Italy) Jennifer Ruggeri; 7–5, 6–2	(Spain) Ane Mintegi del Olmo	(Italy) Alessandra Mazzola (France) Nina Radovanovic	(Greece) Despina Papamichail (Spain) Lucía Cortez Llorca (Greece) Martha Matoula (Italy) Giorgia Pedone
October 19	Santa Margherita di Pula, Italy; Clay; W35; Singles and doubles draws	(France) Lucie Nguyen Tan (Ukraine) Daria Yesypchuk; 6–3, 6–3	(Greece) Marianna Argyrokastriti (Spain) Lucía Cortez Llorca	(Italy) Alessandra Mazzola (France) Nina Radovanovic	(Greece) Despina Papamichail (Spain) Lucía Cortez Llorca (Greece) Martha Matoula (Italy) Giorgia Pedone
October 19	Monastir, Tunisia; Hard; W35; Singles and doubles draws	(Japan) Kayo Nishimura; 6–4, 6–1	(Serbia) Elena Milovanović	(France) Tiphanie Lemaître (Germany) Marie Vogt	(India) Maaya Rajeshwaran (India) Vaishnavi Adkar (Ukraine) Yelyzaveta Kotliar (United States) Sofia Rojas
October 19	Monastir, Tunisia; Hard; W35; Singles and doubles draws	(Germany) Marie Vogt; Ekaterina Yashina; 7–5, 2–6, [10–5]	(Turkey) Ada Kumru (Poland) Amelia Paszun	(France) Tiphanie Lemaître (Germany) Marie Vogt	(India) Maaya Rajeshwaran (India) Vaishnavi Adkar (Ukraine) Yelyzaveta Kotliar (United States) Sofia Rojas
October 19	Bakersfield, United States; Hard; W35; Singles and doubles draws	(United States) Hanna Chang; 6–3, 7–5	(United States) Jenna DeFalco	(China) Mi Lan (United States) Connie Ma	(France) Yara Bartashevich (Egypt) Jana Hossam Salah (United States) Jo-yee Chan (Australia) Astra Sharma
October 19	Bakersfield, United States; Hard; W35; Singles and doubles draws	(Australia) Lily Fairclough (United States) Anne Christine Lütkemeyer; 6–2, 6–3	(Bosnia and Herzegovina) Ema Burgić (Romania) Briana Szabó	(China) Mi Lan (United States) Connie Ma	(France) Yara Bartashevich (Egypt) Jana Hossam Salah (United States) Jo-yee Chan (Australia) Astra Sharma
October 19	Singapore; Hard (i); W15; Singles and doubles draws	Alexandra Malova; 6–7^{(3–7)}, 6–4, 6–4	(Papua New Guinea) Violet Apisah	(Kazakhstan) Aruzhan Sagandykova (China) Lu Jingjing	(China) Sun Yingqun (Chinese Taipei) Lin Fang-an (Japan) Kurea Hayasaka (Thailand) Thasaporn Naklo
October 19	Singapore; Hard (i); W15; Singles and doubles draws	(Thailand) Anchisa Chanta (Thailand) Thasaporn Naklo; 6–1, 6–3	(Chinese Taipei) Lin Fang-an (China) Lu Jingjing	(Kazakhstan) Aruzhan Sagandykova (China) Lu Jingjing	(China) Sun Yingqun (Chinese Taipei) Lin Fang-an (Japan) Kurea Hayasaka (Thailand) Thasaporn Naklo
October 19	Villena, Spain; Hard; W15; Singles and doubles draws	(Spain) Neus Torner Sensano; 6–3, 6–4	(Spain) Charo Esquiva Bañuls	(Italy) Noemi Maines (Ukraine) Kateryna Lazarenko	(Italy) Anastasia Bertacchi; Maria Andrienko (Spain) Juliana Giaccio (China) Ruan Ziying
October 19	Villena, Spain; Hard; W15; Singles and doubles draws	(Spain) Alba Maria Coromina Boluda (Spain) Gabriela Paun; 5–7, 6–3, [10–7]	(Spain) María Paredes Pérez (Spain) Lucía Ros Parres	(Italy) Noemi Maines (Ukraine) Kateryna Lazarenko	(Italy) Anastasia Bertacchi; Maria Andrienko (Spain) Juliana Giaccio (China) Ruan Ziying
October 19	Karlovy Vary, Czech Republic; Hard (i); W15; Singles and doubles draws	(Ukraine) Daria Lopatetska; 0–6, 7–6^{(14–12)}, 6–3	(Czech Republic) Kateřina Zajíčková	(Czech Republic) Pavla Švíglerová (Germany) Lola Giza	(Czech Republic) Tereza Krejčová (Germany) Emily Victoria Eigelsbach (Finland) Ella Haavisto (Germany) Isabella Angelina Abendroth
October 19	Karlovy Vary, Czech Republic; Hard (i); W15; Singles and doubles draws	(Germany) Isabella Angelina Abendroth (Germany) Jolie Angelique Abendroth; 6–3, 6–3	(Czech Republic) Laetitia Pulchartová (Germany) Angelina Wirges	(Czech Republic) Pavla Švíglerová (Germany) Lola Giza	(Czech Republic) Tereza Krejčová (Germany) Emily Victoria Eigelsbach (Finland) Ella Haavisto (Germany) Isabella Angelina Abendroth
October 19	Bol, Croatia; Clay; W15; Singles and doubles draws	(United States) Mia Horvit; 6–3, 6–0	(Germany) Sonja Zhenikhova	(Croatia) Tara Würth (Serbia) Andrea Obradović	(Poland) Daria Gorska (Hungary) Viktória Varga (Sweden) Maja Radenkovic (Greece) Sapfo Sakellaridi
October 19	Bol, Croatia; Clay; W15; Singles and doubles draws	(Czech Republic) Eliška Ticháčková (United States) Anita Tu; Walkover	(Romania) Patricia Georgiana Goina (United States) Mia Horvit	(Croatia) Tara Würth (Serbia) Andrea Obradović	(Poland) Daria Gorska (Hungary) Viktória Varga (Sweden) Maja Radenkovic (Greece) Sapfo Sakellaridi
October 19	Sharm El Sheikh, Egypt; Hard; W15; Singles and doubles draws	Kamilla Bartone; 4–6, 6–4, 6–4	(Egypt) Sandra Samir	(Croatia) Karla Popović (Egypt) Lamis Alhussein Abdel Aziz	(Slovakia) Radka Zelníčková (Romania) Ioana-Ștefania Boian; Stefaniya Neporent; Kristina Dmitruk
October 19	Sharm El Sheikh, Egypt; Hard; W15; Singles and doubles draws	(Egypt) Lamis Alhussein Abdel Aziz (Egypt) Sandra Samir; 6–1, 7–6^{(7–4)}	(Croatia) Karla Popović (Bulgaria) Isabella Shinikova	(Croatia) Karla Popović (Egypt) Lamis Alhussein Abdel Aziz	(Slovakia) Radka Zelníčková (Romania) Ioana-Ștefania Boian; Stefaniya Neporent; Kristina Dmitruk
October 19	Campina Grande, Brazil; Clay; W15; Singles and doubles draws	(Mexico) Ana Sofía Sánchez; 4–6, 6–4, 6–1	(Argentina) Justina María González Daniele	(Chile) Bárbara Gatica (Argentina) María Florencia Urrutia	(Colombia) Valentina Mediorreal (Chile) Fernanda Labraña (Brazil) Marjorie Souza (United States) Paola Lopez
October 19	Campina Grande, Brazil; Clay; W15; Singles and doubles draws	(Colombia) Valentina Mediorreal (Mexico) Ana Sofía Sánchez; 6–2, 6–3	(Brazil) Letícia Garcia Vidal (Brazil) Júlia Konishi Camargo Silva	(Chile) Bárbara Gatica (Argentina) María Florencia Urrutia	(Colombia) Valentina Mediorreal (Chile) Fernanda Labraña (Brazil) Marjorie Souza (United States) Paola Lopez
October 26	NBTX Open; New Braunfels, United States; Hard; W100; Singles and doubles draws	(United States) Caroline Dolehide; 6–4, 6–3	(United States) Julieta Pareja	(United States) Akasha Urhobo; Kristina Liutova	(Mexico) Renata Zarazúa (United States) Sloane Stephens (Japan) Yuki Naito (United States) Connie Ma
October 26	NBTX Open; New Braunfels, United States; Hard; W100; Singles and doubles draws	(United States) Savannah Broadus (United States) Allura Zamarripa; 7–6^{(7–5)}, 6–0	(United States) Kylie Collins (United States) Kristina Penickova	(United States) Akasha Urhobo; Kristina Liutova	(Mexico) Renata Zarazúa (United States) Sloane Stephens (Japan) Yuki Naito (United States) Connie Ma
October 26	GB Pro-Series Glasgow; Glasgow, United Kingdom; Hard (i); W75; Singles and doubles draws	(Netherlands) Suzan Lamens; 6–4, 6–3	(United States) Fiona Crawley	(United Kingdom) Hannah Klugman (United Kingdom) Alicia Dudeney	(Germany) Tessa Brockmann (United Kingdom) Eliz Maloney (Germany) Ella Seidel (Germany) Mona Barthel
October 26	GB Pro-Series Glasgow; Glasgow, United Kingdom; Hard (i); W75; Singles and doubles draws	(United Kingdom) Savannah Dada-Mascoll (Kenya) Angella Okutoyi; 6–3, 6–3	(Estonia) Elena Malygina (United Kingdom) Amelia Rajecki	(United Kingdom) Hannah Klugman (United Kingdom) Alicia Dudeney	(Germany) Tessa Brockmann (United Kingdom) Eliz Maloney (Germany) Ella Seidel (Germany) Mona Barthel
October 26	Internationaux Féminins de la Vienne; Poitiers, France; Hard (i); W75; Singles and doubles draws	(Ukraine) Veronika Podrez; 6–3, 7–5	(France) Océane Dodin	(Malta) Francesca Curmi (France) Clara Burel	(France) Jenny Lim (Belgium) Margaux Maquet (France) Harmony Tan (Serbia) Lola Radivojević
October 26	Internationaux Féminins de la Vienne; Poitiers, France; Hard (i); W75; Singles and doubles draws	(Portugal) Francisca Jorge (Portugal) Matilde Jorge; 6–2, 7–6^{(8–6)}	(France) Estelle Cascino (China) Feng Shuo	(Malta) Francesca Curmi (France) Clara Burel	(France) Jenny Lim (Belgium) Margaux Maquet (France) Harmony Tan (Serbia) Lola Radivojević
October 26	Tevlin Women's Challenger; Toronto, Canada; Hard (i); W75; Singles and doubles draws	(United States) Reese Brantmeier; 6–3, 6–1	(Canada) Katherine Sebov	(United States) Ayana Akli (Sweden) Kajsa Rinaldo Persson	(United States) Carson Tanguilig (United States) Madison Sieg (Switzerland) Valentina Ryser (United States) Lea Ma
October 26	Tevlin Women's Challenger; Toronto, Canada; Hard (i); W75; Singles and doubles draws	(Canada) Ariana Arseneault (Canada) Raphaëlle Lacasse; 6–1, 7–6^{(7–3)}	(United States) Ayana Akli (United States) Madison Sieg	(United States) Ayana Akli (Sweden) Kajsa Rinaldo Persson	(United States) Carson Tanguilig (United States) Madison Sieg (Switzerland) Valentina Ryser (United States) Lea Ma
October 26	Istanbul, Türkiye; Hard (i); W50; Singles and doubles draws	Daria Egorova; 6–4, 6–0	(Germany) Nastasja Schunk	Anna Kubareva (Slovakia) Viktória Hrunčáková	(Bulgaria) Lidia Encheva (Cyprus) Raluca Șerban; Maria Golovina (Slovakia) Katarína Kužmová
October 26	Istanbul, Türkiye; Hard (i); W50; Singles and doubles draws	Daria Egorova; Ksenia Zaytseva; 2–6, 6–0, [10–1]	Anna Sedysheva; Ksenia Smirnova	Anna Kubareva (Slovakia) Viktória Hrunčáková	(Bulgaria) Lidia Encheva (Cyprus) Raluca Șerban; Maria Golovina (Slovakia) Katarína Kužmová
October 26	Morelia, Mexico; Hard; W50; Singles and doubles draws	(United States) Malaika Rapolu; 6–4, 6–0	Anastasia Tikhonova	(Canada) Cadence Brace (Turkey) İpek Öz	(Lithuania) Justina Mikulskytė (Mexico) Julia García Ruiz (United States) Jo-yee Chan (Dominican Republic) Ana Zamburek
October 26	Morelia, Mexico; Hard; W50; Singles and doubles draws	(Turkey) İpek Öz; Anastasia Tikhonova; 7–6^{(7–2)}, 6–3	(United States) Jo-yee Chan (United States) Kennedy Gibbs	(Canada) Cadence Brace (Turkey) İpek Öz	(Lithuania) Justina Mikulskytė (Mexico) Julia García Ruiz (United States) Jo-yee Chan (Dominican Republic) Ana Zamburek
October 26	Sydney, Australia; Hard; W35; Singles and doubles draws	(United Kingdom) Katie Swan; 6–1, 6–2	(Japan) Hikaru Sato	(Japan) Funa Kozaki (Australia) Belle Thompson	(Chinese Taipei) Wan I-wen (India) Vaidehi Chaudhari (Japan) Erika Sema (Australia) Alana Subasic
October 26	Sydney, Australia; Hard; W35; Singles and doubles draws	(South Korea) Back Da-yeon (Japan) Ikumi Yamazaki; 2–6, 6–4, [10–5]	(Japan) Hikaru Sato (New Zealand) Elyse Tse	(Japan) Funa Kozaki (Australia) Belle Thompson	(Chinese Taipei) Wan I-wen (India) Vaidehi Chaudhari (Japan) Erika Sema (Australia) Alana Subasic
October 26	Kunshan, China; Hard; W35; Singles and doubles draws	(China) Lin Yujun; 6–2, 7–5	(China) Zheng Wushuang	(China) Yuan Chengyiyi (China) Wei Sijia	(China) Shao Yushan (China) Chen Mengyi (Indonesia) Priska Nugroho (China) Wang Jiayi
October 26	Kunshan, China; Hard; W35; Singles and doubles draws	(China) Huang Yujia; Daria Zelinskaya; 6–4, 6–4	(China) Guo Meiqi (China) Yang Yidi	(China) Yuan Chengyiyi (China) Wei Sijia	(China) Shao Yushan (China) Chen Mengyi (Indonesia) Priska Nugroho (China) Wang Jiayi
October 26	Marsa, Malta; Hard; W35; Singles and doubles draws	(Greece) Valentini Grammatikopoulou; 6–4, 6–3	(Poland) Weronika Ewald	(Italy) Federica Urgesi (Slovenia) Pia Lovrič	(Italy) Angelica Raggi (Italy) Vittoria Paganetti (Serbia) Anja Stanković (Switzerland) Chelsea Fontenel
October 26	Marsa, Malta; Hard; W35; Singles and doubles draws	(United Kingdom) Esther Adeshina (Greece) Valentini Grammatikopoulou; 6–1, 6–3	(Italy) Vittoria Paganetti (Italy) Federica Urgesi	(Italy) Federica Urgesi (Slovenia) Pia Lovrič	(Italy) Angelica Raggi (Italy) Vittoria Paganetti (Serbia) Anja Stanković (Switzerland) Chelsea Fontenel
October 26	Norman, United States; Hard; W35; Singles and doubles draws	Alina Shcherbinina; 7–5, 6–4	(Peru) Dana Guzmán	(Thailand) Salakthip Ounmuang (United States) Ashley Lahey	(Benin) Gloriana Nahum (France) Chloé Noël (Denmark) Rebecca Munk Mortensen (United States) Bella Payne
October 26	Norman, United States; Hard; W35; Singles and doubles draws	Evialina Laskevich; Edda Mamedova; 4–6, 6–4, [10–8]	(United States) Ashley Lahey (Canada) Alexandra Vagramov	(Thailand) Salakthip Ounmuang (United States) Ashley Lahey	(Benin) Gloriana Nahum (France) Chloé Noël (Denmark) Rebecca Munk Mortensen (United States) Bella Payne
October 26	Singapore; Hard (i); W15; Singles and doubles draws	(Thailand) Thasaporn Naklo; 6–2, 6–2	(Papua New Guinea) Violet Apisah	(South Korea) Hong Ye-ri; Alexandra Malova	(Thailand) Anchisa Chanta (Japan) Nagi Hanatani (Thailand) Kamonwan Yodpetch (China) Sun Yingqun
October 26	Singapore; Hard (i); W15; Singles and doubles draws	(South Korea) Kim Yu-jin (Chinese Taipei) Lin Fang-an; 6–1, 6–1	(Japan) Nagi Hanatani (China) Lu Jingjing	(South Korea) Hong Ye-ri; Alexandra Malova	(Thailand) Anchisa Chanta (Japan) Nagi Hanatani (Thailand) Kamonwan Yodpetch (China) Sun Yingqun
October 26	Essen, Germany; Hard (i); W15; Singles and doubles draws	(Netherlands) Lian Tran; 6–2, 6–3	(Germany) Josy Daems	(Germany) Emma Sophie Glaser (Germany) Leticia Solakov	(Germany) Emily Victoria Eigelsbach (Czech Republic) Emma Slavíková (Germany) Victoria Pohle (Belgium) Tilwith di Girolami
October 26	Essen, Germany; Hard (i); W15; Singles and doubles draws	(Germany) Josy Daems (Germany) Gloria Reusch; 6–2, 6–1	(Germany) Leonie Schuknecht (Germany) Maja Schweika	(Germany) Emma Sophie Glaser (Germany) Leticia Solakov	(Germany) Emily Victoria Eigelsbach (Czech Republic) Emma Slavíková (Germany) Victoria Pohle (Belgium) Tilwith di Girolami
October 26	Täby, Sweden; Hard (i); W15; Singles and doubles draws	(Sweden) Iva Marinkovic; 7–5, 6–2	(Netherlands) Klara Veldman	(Estonia) Elizaveta Anikina (Finland) Ella Haavisto	(Sweden) Caijsa Hennemann (Norway) Astrid Brune Olsen (Lithuania) Iveta Dapkutė (Netherlands) Coco Bosman
October 26	Täby, Sweden; Hard (i); W15; Singles and doubles draws	(Netherlands) Coco Bosman (Netherlands) Klara Veldman; 6–1, 6–2	(Belgium) Alexandra Biot (Sweden) Victoria Kapcia	(Estonia) Elizaveta Anikina (Finland) Ella Haavisto	(Sweden) Caijsa Hennemann (Norway) Astrid Brune Olsen (Lithuania) Iveta Dapkutė (Netherlands) Coco Bosman
October 26	Sharm El Sheikh, Egypt; Hard; W15; Singles and doubles draws	(Netherlands) Rikke de Koning; 6–7^{(5–7)}, 6–4, 6–2	(Egypt) Aya El Sayed	Kristina Dmitruk; Polina Kuharenko	(Turkey) Selina Atay; Kamilla Bartone (Poland) Zuzanna Bednarz (Belgium) Kaat Coppez
October 26	Sharm El Sheikh, Egypt; Hard; W15; Singles and doubles draws	Viktoriia Sedenkova; Maria Shmeleva; 5–7, 6–3, [10–3]	(Egypt) Aya El Sayed (Croatia) Karla Popović	Kristina Dmitruk; Polina Kuharenko	(Turkey) Selina Atay; Kamilla Bartone (Poland) Zuzanna Bednarz (Belgium) Kaat Coppez
October 26	Monastir, Tunisia; Hard; W15; Singles and doubles draws	(Germany) Marie Vogt; 4–6, 6–0, 6–3	(Japan) Kayo Nishimura	(Ukraine) Mariia Lazarenko (China) Zhu Chenting	(United States) Sofia Rojas (China) Lei Mailuodi; Anna Shkutova (France) Cindy Langlais
October 26	Monastir, Tunisia; Hard; W15; Singles and doubles draws	(Japan) Kayo Nishimura (China) Zhu Chenting; 6–2, 6–0	(Poland) Sara Husar (Poland) Martyna Śrutwa	(Ukraine) Mariia Lazarenko (China) Zhu Chenting	(United States) Sofia Rojas (China) Lei Mailuodi; Anna Shkutova (France) Cindy Langlais
October 26	Sumter, United States; Clay; W15; Singles and doubles draws	(United States) Emery Combs; 6–4 ret.	(Poland) Malwina Rowińska	(Ukraine) Anita Sahdiieva (United States) Lani Chang	(France) Alice Soulié (United States) Yael Saffar (United States) Scarlett Fagan (Czech Republic) Amélie Šmejkalová
October 26	Sumter, United States; Clay; W15; Singles and doubles draws	(United States) Emery Combs (United States) Olivia de los Reyes; 7–6^{(7–3)}, 3–6, [11–9]	Daria Koreshkova (Republic of Ireland) Celine Simunyu	(Ukraine) Anita Sahdiieva (United States) Lani Chang	(France) Alice Soulié (United States) Yael Saffar (United States) Scarlett Fagan (Czech Republic) Amélie Šmejkalová
October 26	Neuquén, Argentina; Clay; W15; Singles and doubles draws	(Argentina) Josefina Estévez; 6–0, 6–3	(Argentina) Luciana Moyano	(Argentina) Emily Zornada (Argentina) Sol Ailin Larraya Guidi	(Argentina) Valentina Abril Bruno (Argentina) Luna Morini (Argentina) Sofía Meabe (Argentina) Ana Victoria Gobbi Monllau
October 26	Neuquén, Argentina; Clay; W15; Singles and doubles draws	(United Kingdom) Melissa Boyden (Argentina) Luciana Moyano; 6–3, 6–3	(Argentina) Josefina Estévez (Argentina) Sol Ailin Larraya Guidi	(Argentina) Emily Zornada (Argentina) Sol Ailin Larraya Guidi	(Argentina) Valentina Abril Bruno (Argentina) Luna Morini (Argentina) Sofía Meabe (Argentina) Ana Victoria Gobbi Monllau

=== November ===
Week of	Tournament	Winner	Runners-up	Semifinalists	Quarterfinalists
November 2	Incheon Open; Incheon, South Korea; Hard; W100; Singles and doubles draws	(United Kingdom) Katie Swan; 6–1, 0–6, 6–3	(South Korea) Ku Yeon-woo	(China) Shi Han (Japan) Sara Saito	(Turkey) Berfu Cengiz (China) Yao Xinxin (China) Wang Jiayi (Indonesia) Priska Nugroho
November 2	Incheon Open; Incheon, South Korea; Hard; W100; Singles and doubles draws	Ekaterina Ovcharenko; Valeria Savinykh; 7–5, 1–6, [13–11]	(Japan) Natsumi Kawaguchi (Japan) Hikaru Sato	(China) Shi Han (Japan) Sara Saito	(Turkey) Berfu Cengiz (China) Yao Xinxin (China) Wang Jiayi (Indonesia) Priska Nugroho
November 2	Kyotec Open; Pétange, Luxembourg; Hard (i); W75; Singles and doubles draws	(Ukraine) Veronika Podrez; 6–2, 7–5	(Czech Republic) Anna Sisková	(Belgium) Greet Minnen (Germany) Tessa Brockmann	(France) Océane Dodin (France) Amandine Hesse (Serbia) Lola Radivojević (Sweden) Lisa Zaar
November 2	Kyotec Open; Pétange, Luxembourg; Hard (i); W75; Singles and doubles draws	(Germany) Tessa Brockmann (Germany) Ella Seidel; 6–4, 6–3	(United States) Clervie Ngounoue (United States) Malkia Ngounoue	(Belgium) Greet Minnen (Germany) Tessa Brockmann	(France) Océane Dodin (France) Amandine Hesse (Serbia) Lola Radivojević (Sweden) Lisa Zaar
November 2	Heraklion, Greece; Clay; W50; Singles and doubles draws	(Cyprus) Raluca Șerban; 3–6, 6–3, 6–1	(Greece) Martha Matoula	(Czech Republic) Alisa Oktiabreva (Italy) Nuria Brancaccio	(Spain) Ángela Fita Boluda (France) Lucie Nguyen Tan (Sweden) Caijsa Hennemann (Italy) Jennifer Ruggeri
November 2	Heraklion, Greece; Clay; W50; Singles and doubles draws	(Germany) Joëlle Steur (Netherlands) Sarah van Emst; 6–0, 6–2	(Italy) Deborah Chiesa (Italy) Giorgia Pedone	(Czech Republic) Alisa Oktiabreva (Italy) Nuria Brancaccio	(Spain) Ángela Fita Boluda (France) Lucie Nguyen Tan (Sweden) Caijsa Hennemann (Italy) Jennifer Ruggeri
November 2	Huamantla, Mexico; Hard; W50; Singles and doubles draws	(United States) Malaika Rapolu; 6–2, 6–3	(Italy) Diletta Cherubini	(Canada) Cadence Brace (Mexico) Victoria Rodríguez	(Mexico) María Portillo Ramírez (Ukraine) Valeriya Strakhova (United Kingdom) Sofia Johnson (Poland) Zuzanna Pawlikowska
November 2	Huamantla, Mexico; Hard; W50; Singles and doubles draws	(Mexico) María Fernanda Navarro Oliva (Poland) Zuzanna Pawlikowska; 6–4, 4–6, [10–2]	(Mexico) Victoria Rodríguez (Netherlands) Demi Tran	(Canada) Cadence Brace (Mexico) Victoria Rodríguez	(Mexico) María Portillo Ramírez (Ukraine) Valeriya Strakhova (United Kingdom) Sofia Johnson (Poland) Zuzanna Pawlikowska
November 2	Hamamatsu, Japan; Carpet; W35; Singles and doubles draws	(Japan) Kanon Sawashiro; 6–1, 6–4	(Japan) Ayano Shimizu	(Chinese Taipei) Tsao Chia-yi (Japan) Shiho Tsujioka	(Japan) Koharu Ito (Sweden) Tiana Tian Deng (Japan) Kurea Hayasaka (Japan) Mio Mushika
November 2	Hamamatsu, Japan; Carpet; W35; Singles and doubles draws	(Japan) Ayano Shimizu (Japan) Kisa Yoshioka; 6–2, 6–2	(Japan) Haruna Arakawa (Japan) Minami Suzuki	(Chinese Taipei) Tsao Chia-yi (Japan) Shiho Tsujioka	(Japan) Koharu Ito (Sweden) Tiana Tian Deng (Japan) Kurea Hayasaka (Japan) Mio Mushika
November 2	Liberec, Czech Republic; Hard (i); W35; Singles and doubles draws	(Poland) Weronika Ewald; 6–2, 0–1 ret.	(Germany) Julia Stusek	(Switzerland) Valentina Ryser (Croatia) Lea Bošković	(Serbia) Elena Milovanović (Czech Republic) Lenka Munzarová (Poland) Oriana Gniewkowska (Czech Republic) Denisa Žoldáková
November 2	Liberec, Czech Republic; Hard (i); W35; Singles and doubles draws	(Germany) Julia Stusek (Czech Republic) Denisa Žoldáková; 2–6, 7–6^{(8–6)}, [10–4]	(Czech Republic) Alena Kovačková (Czech Republic) Tereza Krejčová	(Switzerland) Valentina Ryser (Croatia) Lea Bošković	(Serbia) Elena Milovanović (Czech Republic) Lenka Munzarová (Poland) Oriana Gniewkowska (Czech Republic) Denisa Žoldáková
November 2	Orlando, United States; Hard; W35; Singles and doubles draws	Evialina Laskevich; 6–2, 3–6, 6–3	(United States) Janae Preston	(United States) Ashton Bowers (United States) Whitney Osuigwe	(United States) Luciana Perry (United States) Vivian Wolff (France) Yara Bartashevich (Egypt) Jana Hossam Salah
November 2	Orlando, United States; Hard; W35; Singles and doubles draws	(United States) Annika Penickova (United States) Kristina Penickova; 6–4, 6–1	(United States) Julia Adams (Romania) Briana Szabó	(United States) Ashton Bowers (United States) Whitney Osuigwe	(United States) Luciana Perry (United States) Vivian Wolff (France) Yara Bartashevich (Egypt) Jana Hossam Salah
November 2	Ma'anshan, China; Hard (i); W15; Singles and doubles draws	Alina Tikhonova; 6–2, 6–3	(China) Shao Yushan	(China) Sun Yingqun (Japan) Ikumi Yamazaki	(China) Wang Jiaqi; Maria Pankratova (China) Wang Yuhan (China) Anna Yang
November 2	Ma'anshan, China; Hard (i); W15; Singles and doubles draws	Alina Tikhonova (Japan) Ikumi Yamazaki; 7–6^{(7–2)}, 6–3	(China) Chen Yiru (China) Tang Xiao	(China) Sun Yingqun (Japan) Ikumi Yamazaki	(China) Wang Jiaqi; Maria Pankratova (China) Wang Yuhan (China) Anna Yang
November 2	Szabolcsveresmart, Hungary; Hard (i); W15; Singles and doubles draws	(Slovakia) Sofia Barháčová; 7–5, 7–6^{(7–5)}	(Hungary) Melinda Bíró	(Hungary) Emese Serkedi (Hungary) Luca Kalman	(Norway) Matylda Burylo (Belgium) Alexandra Biot (Germany) Ann Akasha Ceuca (Hungary) Kitti Molnár
November 2	Szabolcsveresmart, Hungary; Hard (i); W15; Singles and doubles draws	(Hungary) Luca Kalman (Hungary) Anna Mihálka; 4–6, 6–2, [12–10]	(Hungary) Melinda Bíró (Austria) Liel Marlies Rothensteiner	(Hungary) Emese Serkedi (Hungary) Luca Kalman	(Norway) Matylda Burylo (Belgium) Alexandra Biot (Germany) Ann Akasha Ceuca (Hungary) Kitti Molnár
November 2	Antalya, Türkiye; Clay; W15; Singles and doubles draws	(Serbia) Jana Bojović; 6–3, 1–6, 5–1 ret.	Valeriia Iushchenko	(Latvia) Adelina Lačinova (Switzerland) Anais Gabriel	(Turkey) Selina Atay (Romania) Diana-Ioana Simionescu (Turkey) Ada Kumru; Ksenia Laskutova
November 2	Antalya, Türkiye; Clay; W15; Singles and doubles draws	(Romania) Alesia Breaz (Romania) Diana-Ioana Simionescu; 6–4, 6–4	(Bulgaria) Julia Stamatova (Germany) Angelina Wirges	(Latvia) Adelina Lačinova (Switzerland) Anais Gabriel	(Turkey) Selina Atay (Romania) Diana-Ioana Simionescu (Turkey) Ada Kumru; Ksenia Laskutova
November 2	Sharm El Sheikh, Egypt; Hard; W15; Singles and doubles draws	(Egypt) Yasmin Ezzat; 7–5, 6–2	(Croatia) Karla Popović	Anna Snigireva (United Kingdom) Hollie Smart	Alisa Terentyeva (Egypt) Hania Abouelsaad (Lithuania) Iveta Dapkutė (Turkey) İrem Kurt
November 2	Sharm El Sheikh, Egypt; Hard; W15; Singles and doubles draws	Kristina Belkova; Polina Kuharenko; 6–4, 4–6, [10–5]	Viktoriia Sedenkova; Maria Shmeleva	Anna Snigireva (United Kingdom) Hollie Smart	Alisa Terentyeva (Egypt) Hania Abouelsaad (Lithuania) Iveta Dapkutė (Turkey) İrem Kurt
November 2	Monastir, Tunisia; Hard; W15; Singles and doubles draws	(Ukraine) Mariia Lazarenko; 7–5, 6–0	Anastasia Lizunova	(France) Océane Babel (France) Astrid Cirotte	(Spain) Marta Soriano Santiago (China) Lei Mailuodi (Czech Republic) Sophie Ehrenbergerová (United States) Mia Horvit
November 2	Monastir, Tunisia; Hard; W15; Singles and doubles draws	(France) Manon Arcangioli (France) Astrid Cirotte; 5–7, 6–2, [10–5]	Anastasia Lizunova; Mariia Masiianskaia	(France) Océane Babel (France) Astrid Cirotte	(Spain) Marta Soriano Santiago (China) Lei Mailuodi (Czech Republic) Sophie Ehrenbergerová (United States) Mia Horvit
November 2	Hilton Head Island, United States; Clay; W15; Singles and doubles draws	(United States) Ashley Lahey; 6–2, 4–6, 6–3	(Morocco) Aya El Aouni	(United States) Emery Combs (Germany) Jantje Tilbürger	(Hong Kong) Kallista Liu (United States) Juliana Nicole Singeorzan (United States) Lani Chang (United States) Scarlett Fagan
November 2	Hilton Head Island, United States; Clay; W15; Singles and doubles draws	(United States) Ava Catanzarite (United States) Kate Sharabura; 1–6, 6–4, [11–9]	(Morocco) Aya El Aouni (United States) Yael Saffar	(United States) Emery Combs (Germany) Jantje Tilbürger	(Hong Kong) Kallista Liu (United States) Juliana Nicole Singeorzan (United States) Lani Chang (United States) Scarlett Fagan
November 2	Neuquén, Argentina; Clay; W15; Singles and doubles draws	(Chile) Antonia Vergara Rivera; 6–3, 6–4	(Argentina) Justina María González Daniele	(Argentina) Victoria Bosio (Chile) Fernanda Labraña	(Ecuador) Camila Romero (Argentina) Josefina Estévez (Argentina) Berta Bonardi (Argentina) Luciana Moyano
November 2	Neuquén, Argentina; Clay; W15; Singles and doubles draws	(Chile) Fernanda Labraña (Chile) Antonia Vergara Rivera; 6–4, 4–6, [10–7]	(Argentina) Luciana Moyano (Ecuador) Camila Romero	(Argentina) Victoria Bosio (Chile) Fernanda Labraña	(Ecuador) Camila Romero (Argentina) Josefina Estévez (Argentina) Berta Bonardi (Argentina) Luciana Moyano
November 9	River City Challenger; Brisbane, Australia; Hard; W75; Singles and doubles draws	(Chinese Taipei) Joanna Garland; 5–7, 6–1, 6–2	(United States) Carol Young Suh Lee	(China) Bai Zhuoxuan (Australia) Emerson Jones	(Japan) Himeno Sakatsume (Japan) Hayu Kinoshita (Australia) Olivia Gadecki (China) Yao Xinxin
November 9	River City Challenger; Brisbane, Australia; Hard; W75; Singles and doubles draws	(Australia) Olivia Gadecki (Chinese Taipei) Wan I-wen; 6–2, 6–0	(Australia) Amy Stevens (Australia) Belle Thompson	(China) Bai Zhuoxuan (Australia) Emerson Jones	(Japan) Himeno Sakatsume (Japan) Hayu Kinoshita (Australia) Olivia Gadecki (China) Yao Xinxin
November 9	Keio Challenger; Yokohama, Japan; Hard; W50; Singles and doubles draws	(Japan) Kyōka Okamura; 6–4, 6–4	(United Kingdom) Heather Watson	(Japan) Kanon Sawashiro (Chinese Taipei) Tsao Chia-yi	(South Korea) Ku Yeon-woo (Turkey) Berfu Cengiz (Japan) Sara Saito (Japan) Rinko Matsuda
November 9	Keio Challenger; Yokohama, Japan; Hard; W50; Singles and doubles draws	(Chinese Taipei) Li Yu-yun (Japan) Sara Saito; 6–4, 6–2	(South Korea) Kim Eun-chae (Japan) Kanako Morisaki	(Japan) Kanon Sawashiro (Chinese Taipei) Tsao Chia-yi	(South Korea) Ku Yeon-woo (Turkey) Berfu Cengiz (Japan) Sara Saito (Japan) Rinko Matsuda
November 9	Chihuahua, Mexico; Hard; W50; Singles and doubles draws	(Canada) Kayla Cross; 6–7^{(5–7)}, 7–5, 6–3	(Romania) Miriam Bulgaru	(Mexico) Jéssica Hinojosa Gómez (United States) Vivian Wolff	(Turkey) İpek Öz (United States) Malaika Rapolu (Italy) Miriana Tona (Greece) Despina Papamichail
November 9	Chihuahua, Mexico; Hard; W50; Singles and doubles draws	(Ukraine) Valeriya Strakhova; Anastasia Tikhonova; 6–0, 7–6^{(7–4)}	(Canada) Kayla Cross (Greece) Despina Papamichail	(Mexico) Jéssica Hinojosa Gómez (United States) Vivian Wolff	(Turkey) İpek Öz (United States) Malaika Rapolu (Italy) Miriana Tona (Greece) Despina Papamichail
November 9	Heraklion, Greece; Clay; W35; Singles and doubles draws	(Czech Republic) Alisa Oktiabreva; 6–3, 6–3	(Spain) Ane Mintegi del Olmo	(Spain) Lucía Cortez Llorca (Greece) Sapfo Sakellaridi	(Australia) Tina Smith (Italy) Aurora Zantedeschi (Serbia) Anastasija Cvetković (Italy) Matilde Paoletti
November 9	Heraklion, Greece; Clay; W35; Singles and doubles draws	(Romania) Oana Gavrilă (Greece) Sapfo Sakellaridi; 2–6, 6–4, [10–7]	(Greece) Marianna Argyrokastriti (Spain) Lucía Cortez Llorca	(Spain) Lucía Cortez Llorca (Greece) Sapfo Sakellaridi	(Australia) Tina Smith (Italy) Aurora Zantedeschi (Serbia) Anastasija Cvetković (Italy) Matilde Paoletti
November 9	Weston, United States; Clay; W35; Singles and doubles draws	(United States) Rachel Gailis; 6–4, 6–7^{(5–7)}, 6–0	(Egypt) Jana Hossam Salah	(Spain) Aran Teixidó García (United States) Dasha Ivanova	(Romania) Ilinca Amariei (France) Salma Djoubri (Greece) Michaela Laki (Ukraine) Anita Sahdiieva
November 9	Weston, United States; Clay; W35; Singles and doubles draws	(United States) Violeta Martinez (United States) Lexington Reed; 6–3, 6–2	(Egypt) Jana Hossam Salah (United Kingdom) Allegra Korpanec Davies	(Spain) Aran Teixidó García (United States) Dasha Ivanova	(Romania) Ilinca Amariei (France) Salma Djoubri (Greece) Michaela Laki (Ukraine) Anita Sahdiieva
November 9	Ma'anshan, China; Hard (i); W15; Singles and doubles draws	(Thailand) Thasaporn Naklo; 7–5, 7–5	(China) Luo Xi	Alina Tikhonova; Valeria Savinykh	(China) Wang Jiaqi (Japan) Ikumi Yamazaki; Arina Varaksina (China) Shao Yushan
November 9	Ma'anshan, China; Hard (i); W15; Singles and doubles draws	(China) Hou Yanan (Thailand) Peangtarn Plipuech; 6–4, 7–5	(South Korea) Im Hee-rae (South Korea) Shin Ji-ho	Alina Tikhonova; Valeria Savinykh	(China) Wang Jiaqi (Japan) Ikumi Yamazaki; Arina Varaksina (China) Shao Yushan
November 9	Nules, Spain; Clay; W15; Singles and doubles draws	(Spain) Neus Torner Sensano; 1–6, 6–3, 6–3	(Italy) Aurora Corvi	(Switzerland) Katerina Tsygourova (Romania) Maria Toma	(Spain) Didi Bredberg Canizares (Italy) Chiara Fornasieri (Spain) Juliana Giaccio (Norway) Astrid Brune Olsen
November 9	Nules, Spain; Clay; W15; Singles and doubles draws	(Italy) Chiara Fornasieri (Italy) Ginevra Parentini; 4–6, 6–4, [10–7]	(Norway) Astrid Brune Olsen (Germany) Franziska Sziedat	(Switzerland) Katerina Tsygourova (Romania) Maria Toma	(Spain) Didi Bredberg Canizares (Italy) Chiara Fornasieri (Spain) Juliana Giaccio (Norway) Astrid Brune Olsen
November 9	Paris, France; Hard (i); W15; Singles and doubles draws	(Croatia) Iva Primorac Pavičić; 3–6, 6–2, 6–4	(Switzerland) Chelsea Fontenel	(Netherlands) Isis Louise van den Broek (Latvia) Beatrise Zeltiņa	(France) Sophia Biolay (France) Sarah Iliev (Netherlands) Jade Groen (Belgium) Tilwith di Girolami
November 9	Paris, France; Hard (i); W15; Singles and doubles draws	(Switzerland) Chelsea Fontenel (Germany) Marie Vogt; 6–4, 7–5	(Canada) Françoise Abanda (France) Marie Mattel	(Netherlands) Isis Louise van den Broek (Latvia) Beatrise Zeltiņa	(France) Sophia Biolay (France) Sarah Iliev (Netherlands) Jade Groen (Belgium) Tilwith di Girolami
November 9	Antalya, Türkiye; Clay; W15; Singles and doubles draws	(Romania) Diana-Ioana Simionescu; 6–1, 4–1 ret.	Valeriia Iushchenko	(Switzerland) Anais Gabriel (Turkey) İlay Yörük	(Ukraine) Daria Yesypchuk (Kazakhstan) Asylzhan Arystanbekova (Latvia) Marija Lauva (Romania) Andreea Prisăcariu
November 9	Antalya, Türkiye; Clay; W15; Singles and doubles draws	(Kazakhstan) Azylzhan Arystanbekova (Ukraine) Daria Yesypchuk; 6–4, 3–6, [10–8]	(Romania) Ștefania Bojică (Romania) Anastasia Safta	(Switzerland) Anais Gabriel (Turkey) İlay Yörük	(Ukraine) Daria Yesypchuk (Kazakhstan) Asylzhan Arystanbekova (Latvia) Marija Lauva (Romania) Andreea Prisăcariu
November 9	Sharm El Sheikh, Egypt; Hard; W15; Singles and doubles draws	(Egypt) Lamis Alhussein Abdel Aziz; 7–5, 6–4	Anna Snigireva	(Egypt) Sandra Samir (Kazakhstan) Yekaterina Dmitrichenko	(France) Alyssa Reguer (Egypt) Yasmin Ezzat (Chinese Taipei) Tzeng Mu-jie; Anastasia Efremova
November 9	Sharm El Sheikh, Egypt; Hard; W15; Singles and doubles draws	(Kazakhstan) Yekaterina Dmitrichenko (Turkey) İrem Kurt; 6–2, 6–4	Polina Starkova; Sofiia Suslova	(Egypt) Sandra Samir (Kazakhstan) Yekaterina Dmitrichenko	(France) Alyssa Reguer (Egypt) Yasmin Ezzat (Chinese Taipei) Tzeng Mu-jie; Anastasia Efremova
November 9	Monastir, Tunisia; Hard; W15; Singles and doubles draws	Anastasia Lizunova; 7–6^{(7–3)}, 6–3	(Poland) Daria Kuczer	(Italy) Lavinia Luciano (Italy) Matilde Mariani	(Japan) Rira Kosaka (Italy) Anastasia Bertacchi (Germany) Louanne Djafari (United States) Mia Horvit
November 9	Monastir, Tunisia; Hard; W15; Singles and doubles draws	(Poland) Sara Husar; Anastasia Lizunova; 7–6^{(7–3)}, 6–3	(Germany) Estella Jäger; Mariia Masiianskaia	(Italy) Lavinia Luciano (Italy) Matilde Mariani	(Japan) Rira Kosaka (Italy) Anastasia Bertacchi (Germany) Louanne Djafari (United States) Mia Horvit
November 9	Lincoln, United States; Hard (i); W15; Singles and doubles draws	(Canada) Mia Kupres; 6–2, 6–2	(United Kingdom) Kristina Paskauskas	(United States) Ava Esposito Cogan (Germany) Karla Bartel	(Egypt) Merna Refaat (United States) Karlin Schock; Maria Taranova; Arina Malygina
November 9	Lincoln, United States; Hard (i); W15; Singles and doubles draws	(South Africa) Isabella Kruger (Egypt) Merna Refaat; 6–1, 7–5	(United States) Jenna Dean; Maria Kononova	(United States) Ava Esposito Cogan (Germany) Karla Bartel	(Egypt) Merna Refaat (United States) Karlin Schock; Maria Taranova; Arina Malygina
November 9	São Carlos, Brazil; Clay; W15; Singles and doubles draws	(Switzerland) Marie Mettraux; 5–7, 6–1, 6–3	(Chile) Bárbara Gatica	(Argentina) Victoria Bosio (Brazil) Marjorie Souza	(Brazil) Júlia Konishi Camargo Silva (Argentina) Sofía Meabe (Brazil) Letícia Garcia Vidal (China) Mi Lan
November 9	São Carlos, Brazil; Clay; W15; Singles and doubles draws	(Chile) Bárbara Gatica (Brazil) Rebeca Pereira; 6–2, 6–0	(Brazil) Sabrina Dias (Brazil) Letícia Garcia Vidal	(Argentina) Victoria Bosio (Brazil) Marjorie Souza	(Brazil) Júlia Konishi Camargo Silva (Argentina) Sofía Meabe (Brazil) Letícia Garcia Vidal (China) Mi Lan
November 16	NSW Open; Sydney, Australia; Hard; W75; Singles and doubles draws	(Chinese Taipei) Joanna Garland; 5–7, 7–6^{(7–4)}, 7–5	(Australia) Olivia Gadecki	(China) Zhang Shuai (United Kingdom) Katie Swan	(Japan) Aoi Ito (Japan) Ena Koike (China) Wei Sijia (Australia) Emerson Jones
November 16	NSW Open; Sydney, Australia; Hard; W75; Singles and doubles draws	(United States) Savannah Broadus (Australia) Elena Micic; 4–6, 6–1, [10–8]	(Japan) Natsumi Kawaguchi (China) Zheng Wushuang	(China) Zhang Shuai (United Kingdom) Katie Swan	(Japan) Aoi Ito (Japan) Ena Koike (China) Wei Sijia (Australia) Emerson Jones
November 16	Empire Women's Indoor; Trnava, Slovakia; Hard (i); W75; Singles and doubles draws	(Bulgaria) Elizara Yaneva; 7–6^{(7–1)}, 6–3	(United Kingdom) Mika Stojsavljevic	(United Kingdom) Emily Appleton (Belgium) Greet Minnen	(Georgia (country)) Mariam Bolkvadze (France) Jessika Ponchet (Serbia) Mia Ristić (Netherlands) Suzan Lamens
November 16	Empire Women's Indoor; Trnava, Slovakia; Hard (i); W75; Singles and doubles draws	(United Kingdom) Madeleine Brooks (United States) Dalayna Hewitt; 6–2, 6–2	(Czech Republic) Aneta Kučmová (Czech Republic) Aneta Laboutková	(United Kingdom) Emily Appleton (Belgium) Greet Minnen	(Georgia (country)) Mariam Bolkvadze (France) Jessika Ponchet (Serbia) Mia Ristić (Netherlands) Suzan Lamens
November 16	Funchal, Portugal; Hard; W50; Singles and doubles draws	(United States) Jenna DeFalco; 3–6, 7–6^{(8–6)}, 7–5	(Netherlands) Arantxa Rus	(Croatia) Lea Bošković (Portugal) Matilde Jorge	(Spain) Charo Esquiva Bañuls (Sweden) Nellie Taraba Wallberg (Turkey) Ada Kumru (Spain) Celia Cerviño Ruiz
November 16	Funchal, Portugal; Hard; W50; Singles and doubles draws	(China) Liu Min (Italy) Carlotta Moccia; 7–5, 7–5	(Slovenia) Kristina Novak (Bosnia and Herzegovina) Anita Wagner	(Croatia) Lea Bošković (Portugal) Matilde Jorge	(Spain) Charo Esquiva Bañuls (Sweden) Nellie Taraba Wallberg (Turkey) Ada Kumru (Spain) Celia Cerviño Ruiz
November 16	Heraklion, Greece; Clay; W50; Singles and doubles draws	(Spain) María García Cid; 6–4, 6–2	(Italy) Giorgia Pedone	(Romania) Giulia Safina Popa (Spain) Carlota Martínez Círez	(Spain) Ane Mintegi del Olmo (Cyprus) Raluca Șerban (Greece) Valentini Grammatikopoulou (Spain) Ángela Fita Boluda
November 16	Heraklion, Greece; Clay; W50; Singles and doubles draws	(Greece) Valentini Grammatikopoulou (Greece) Martha Matoula; 6–0, 6–3	(United Kingdom) Victoria Allen (Czech Republic) Michaela Bayerlová	(Romania) Giulia Safina Popa (Spain) Carlota Martínez Círez	(Spain) Ane Mintegi del Olmo (Cyprus) Raluca Șerban (Greece) Valentini Grammatikopoulou (Spain) Ángela Fita Boluda
November 16	Orlando, United States; Clay; W35; Singles and doubles draws	Alina Shcherbenina vs (United States) Madison Sieg		(United States) Lea Ma (United States) Carson Tanguilig	(France) Salma Djoubri (Egypt) Jana Hossam Salah (United States) Victoria Hu (United States) Jordyn Hazelitt
November 16	Orlando, United States; Clay; W35; Singles and doubles draws	Doubles competition was cancelled due to poor weather		(United States) Lea Ma (United States) Carson Tanguilig	(France) Salma Djoubri (Egypt) Jana Hossam Salah (United States) Victoria Hu (United States) Jordyn Hazelitt
November 16	São Paulo, Brazil; Clay; W35; Singles and doubles draws	(Peru) Lucciana Pérez Alarcón; 6–3, 6–0	(Mexico) Ana Sofía Sánchez	(Ecuador) Mell Reasco (Argentina) Victoria Bosio	(Mexico) Victoria Rodríguez (China) Mi Lan (Switzerland) Marie Mettraux (Italy) Martina Colmegna
November 16	São Paulo, Brazil; Clay; W35; Singles and doubles draws	(Mexico) Sabastiani León (Netherlands) Demi Tran; 6–4, 3–6, [10–6]	(Brazil) Ana Candiotto (China) Mi Lan	(Ecuador) Mell Reasco (Argentina) Victoria Bosio	(Mexico) Victoria Rodríguez (China) Mi Lan (Switzerland) Marie Mettraux (Italy) Martina Colmegna
November 16	Alcalá de Henares, Spain; Hard; W15; Singles and doubles draws	Mariia Makarova; 6–1, 6–3	(Germany) Eva Marie Voracek	(China) Tian Jialin (Switzerland) Paula Cembranos	(Spain) Carmen Gallardo Guevara (Spain) Neus Torner Sensano (Spain) Lucia Natal (Bulgaria) Briyana Ivanova
November 16	Alcalá de Henares, Spain; Hard; W15; Singles and doubles draws	Mariia Makarova; Alina Yuneva; 6–2, 6–3	(Spain) Luisa Maria Oprescu (Spain) Maria Trujillo Garnica	(China) Tian Jialin (Switzerland) Paula Cembranos	(Spain) Carmen Gallardo Guevara (Spain) Neus Torner Sensano (Spain) Lucia Natal (Bulgaria) Briyana Ivanova
November 16	Paris, France; Hard (i); W15; Singles and doubles draws	(Croatia) Karla Popović; 6–2, 6–3	(Germany) Mariella Thamm	(Belgium) Tilwith di Girolami (Switzerland) Chelsea Fontenel	(Cyprus) Olga Danilova (France) Sarah Iliev (Italy) Enola Chiesa (Netherlands) Isis Louise van den Broek
November 16	Paris, France; Hard (i); W15; Singles and doubles draws	(France) Marie Mattel (France) Lucie Nguyen Tan; 6–4, 6–1	(Cyprus) Olga Danilova (Croatia) Karla Popović	(Belgium) Tilwith di Girolami (Switzerland) Chelsea Fontenel	(Cyprus) Olga Danilova (France) Sarah Iliev (Italy) Enola Chiesa (Netherlands) Isis Louise van den Broek
November 16	Antalya, Türkiye; Clay; W15; Singles and doubles draws	(Turkey) Doğa Türkmen; 0–6, 6–3, 7–5	(Romania) Diana-Ioana Simionescu	(Latvia) Adelina Lačinova (Belgium) Kaat Coppez	(Ukraine) Daria Yesypchuk (Turkey) İlay Yörük (Romania) Sara Victoria Bălan (Spain) Meritxell Teixidó García
November 16	Antalya, Türkiye; Clay; W15; Singles and doubles draws	(Bulgaria) Julia Stamatova (Turkey) Doğa Türkmen; 4–6, 6–3, [10–6]	(Romania) Ștefania Bojică (Romania) Anastasia Safta	(Latvia) Adelina Lačinova (Belgium) Kaat Coppez	(Ukraine) Daria Yesypchuk (Turkey) İlay Yörük (Romania) Sara Victoria Bălan (Spain) Meritxell Teixidó García
November 16	Sharm El Sheikh, Egypt; Hard; W15; Singles and doubles draws	Anna Kubareva; 6–2, 6–3	Nina Sozaonova	(Egypt) Sandra Samir (Lithuania) Andrė Lukošiūtė	(Turkey) İrem Kurt (Serbia) Gala Ivanović (Italy) Noemi Maines (France) Alyssa Réguer
November 16	Sharm El Sheikh, Egypt; Hard; W15; Singles and doubles draws	(United Kingdom) Savannah Dada-Mascoll (Kazakhstan) Yekaterina Dmitrichenko; 7–6^{(7–2)}, 6–2	Viktoriia Sedenkova; Maria Shmeleva	(Egypt) Sandra Samir (Lithuania) Andrė Lukošiūtė	(Turkey) İrem Kurt (Serbia) Gala Ivanović (Italy) Noemi Maines (France) Alyssa Réguer
November 16	Monastir, Tunisia; Hard; W15; Singles and doubles draws	Maria Andrienko; 6–2, 6–1	(Germany) Mara Guth	(Italy) Carla Giambelli (Italy) Matilde Mariani	(Italy) Lavinia Luciano (Slovenia) Ela Nala Milić (Tunisia) Meriem Ben Ezzeddine (United States) Mia Horvit
November 16	Monastir, Tunisia; Hard; W15; Singles and doubles draws	(Netherlands) Madelief Hageman (Czech Republic) Tereza Krejčová; 6–3, 6–4	(Switzerland) Elsa Bonelli (Switzerland) Noelia Manta	(Italy) Carla Giambelli (Italy) Matilde Mariani	(Italy) Lavinia Luciano (Slovenia) Ela Nala Milić (Tunisia) Meriem Ben Ezzeddine (United States) Mia Horvit
November 23	City of Playford Tennis International; Playford, Australia; Hard; W75; Singles and doubles draws	vs		vs vs	vs vs vs vs
November 23	City of Playford Tennis International; Playford, Australia; Hard; W75; Singles and doubles draws	/ vs /		vs vs	vs vs vs vs
November 23	Empire Women's Indoor II; Trnava, Slovakia; Hard (i); W75; Singles and doubles draws	vs		vs vs	vs vs vs vs
November 23	Empire Women's Indoor II; Trnava, Slovakia; Hard (i); W75; Singles and doubles draws	/ vs /		vs vs	vs vs vs vs
November 23	Engie Open Florianópolis; Florianópolis, Brazil; Clay; W75; Singles and doubles draws	vs		vs vs	vs vs vs vs
November 23	Engie Open Florianópolis; Florianópolis, Brazil; Clay; W75; Singles and doubles draws	/ vs /		vs vs	vs vs vs vs
November 23	Internazionali Tennis Val Gardena Südtirol; Ortisei, Italy; Hard (i); W50; Singles and doubles draws	vs		vs vs	vs vs vs vs
November 23	Internazionali Tennis Val Gardena Südtirol; Ortisei, Italy; Hard (i); W50; Singles and doubles draws	/ vs /		vs vs	vs vs vs vs
November 23	Heraklion, Greece; Clay; W35; Singles and doubles draws	vs		vs vs	vs vs vs vs
November 23	Heraklion, Greece; Clay; W35; Singles and doubles draws	/ vs /		vs vs	vs vs vs vs
November 23	Kolkata, India; Hard; W15; Singles and doubles draws	vs		vs vs	vs vs vs vs
November 23	Kolkata, India; Hard; W15; Singles and doubles draws	/ vs /		vs vs	vs vs vs vs
November 23	Lousada, Portugal; Hard (i); W35; Singles and doubles draws	vs		vs vs	vs vs vs vs
November 23	Lousada, Portugal; Hard (i); W35; Singles and doubles draws	/ vs /		vs vs	vs vs vs vs
November 23	Antalya, Türkiye; Clay; W15; Singles and doubles draws	vs		vs vs	vs vs vs vs
November 23	Antalya, Türkiye; Clay; W15; Singles and doubles draws	/ vs /		vs vs	vs vs vs vs
November 23	Sharm El Sheikh, Egypt; Hard; W15; Singles and doubles draws	vs		vs vs	vs vs vs vs
November 23	Sharm El Sheikh, Egypt; Hard; W15; Singles and doubles draws	/ vs /		vs vs	vs vs vs vs
November 23	Monastir, Tunisia; Hard; W15; Singles and doubles draws	vs		vs vs	vs vs vs vs
November 23	Monastir, Tunisia; Hard; W15; Singles and doubles draws	/ vs /		vs vs	vs vs vs vs
