= Emily Sartz-Lunde =

Norwegian tennis player (born 2006)

- Country (sports): Norway
- Born: 12 January 2006 (age 20)
- Prize money: $2,830

Singles
- Career record: 33–21
- Career titles: 1 ITF
- Highest ranking: No. 896 (13 July 2026)
- Current ranking: No. 869 (2 November 2026)

Grand Slam singles results
- Australian Open Junior: 1R (2024)
- French Open Junior: 1R (2024)
- Wimbledon Junior: 1R (2024)
- US Open Junior: 1R (2024)

Doubles
- Career record: 7–11
- Highest ranking: No. 1333 (28 July 2025)

Grand Slam doubles results
- Australian Open Junior: 2R (2024)
- French Open Junior: 2R (2024)
- Wimbledon Junior: 2R (2024)
- US Open Junior: W (2024)

Team competitions
- Fed Cup: 2–6
- Last updated on: 14 July 2025.

Emily Sartz-Lunde (born 12 January 2006) is a Norwegian tennis player. She won the girls' doubles title at the 2024 US Open.

== Career ==
A member of Holmenkollen Tennisklubb, she represented Norway in the 2024 Billie Jean Cup.

She played in the girls' doubles at the 2024 French Open with Kate Fakih where they lost in the second round to Mingge Xu and Hannah Klugman.

Playing with Malak El Allami of Morocco, she played in the girls' doubles of the 2024 Wimbledon Championships where they were defeated by British pair Mika Stojsavljevic and Mingge Xu in the second round.

At the 2024 US Open she reached the final of the girls' doubles alongside her Moroccan partner Malak El Allami, notching a win over British pair Mika Stojsavljevic and Mingge Xu. In the final, they defeated Julie Paštiková of the Czech Republic and Julia Stusek of Germany on a match tie-break.

== ITF Circuit finals ==
=== Singles: 1 (1 titles) ===
Legend W15 tournaments (1–0)	Finals by surface Hard (1–0)

Result	W–L	Date	Tournament	Tier	Surface	Opponent	Score
Win	1–0	Jun 2026	ITF Monastir, Tunisia	W15	Hard	(United Kingdom) Eliz Maloney	6–3, 7–5

=== Doubles: 1 (runner-up) ===
Legend W15 tournaments (0–1)	Finals by surface Clay (0–1)

Result	W–L	Date	Tournament	Tier	Surface	Partner	Opponents	Score
Loss	0–1	Aug 2024	ITF Huntsville, United States	W15	Clay	(United States) Karina Miller	(United States) Carly Briggs (Australia) Tenika McGiffin	3–6, 6–7^{(3–7)}

== Junior Grand Slam finals ==
=== Doubles: 1 (1 title) ===
Result	Year	Tournament	Surface	Partner	Opponents	Score
Win	2024	US Open	Hard	(Morocco) Malak El Allami	(Czech Republic) Julie Paštiková (Germany) Julia Stusek	6–2, 4–6, [10–6]
