= Malak El Allami =

Moroccan tennis player (born 2006)

- Country (sports): Morocco
- Born: 28 July 2006 (age 19)
- Plays: Right-handed (two-handed backhand)
- Prize money: $18,043

Singles
- Career record: 16–27
- Career titles: 0
- Highest ranking: No. 976 (12 August 2024)

Grand Slam singles results
- French Open Junior: 2R (2023)
- Wimbledon Junior: 2R (2023)
- US Open Junior: 2R (2024)

Doubles
- Career record: 25–16
- Career titles: 2 ITF
- Highest ranking: No. 709 (9 December 2024)
- Current ranking: No. 1037 (11 August 2025)

Grand Slam doubles results
- US Open Junior: W (2024)

Team competitions
- Fed Cup: 9–4
- Last updated on: 11 August 2025.

Malak El Allami (born 28 July 2006) is a Moroccan tennis player.

El Allami has a career-high WTA singles ranking of 976, achieved on 12 August 2024. She also has a career-high WTA doubles ranking of 709, achieved on 9 December 2024.

El Allami made her WTA Tour main-draw debut at the 2023 Morocco Open, where she received entry into the wildcard, but lost in the first round to Kamilla Rakhimova.

She is the first Moroccan female tennis player to win a match at Wimbledon in juniors.

In 2024, she and her partner and compatriot Aya El Aouni became champions in doubles at the ITF W35 tournament held in Casablanca, Morocco.

Playing with Emily Sartz-Lunde of Norway, she played in the girls' doubles of the 2024 Wimbledon Championships where they were defeated by British pair Mika Stojsavljevic and Mingge Xu in the second round.

At the 2024 US Open she reached the final of the girls' doubles alongside her Norwegian partner Emily Sartz-Lunde, notching a win over British pair Mika Stojsavljevic and Mingge Xu. In the final, they defeated Julie Paštiková of the Czech Republic and Julia Stusek of Germany on a match tie-break.

== ITF Circuit finals ==
=== Singles: 1 (runner-up) ===
Legend W15 tournaments	Finals by surface Clay (0–1)

Result	W–L	Date	Tournament	Tier	Surface	Opponent	Score
Loss	0–1	Dec 2022	ITF Monastir, Tunisia	W15	Hard	(Belgium) Eliessa Vanlangendonck	1–6, 0–2 ret.

=== Doubles: 2 (2 titles) ===
Legend W35 tournaments W15 tournaments	Finals by surface Hard (1–0) Clay (1–0)

Result	W–L	Date	Tournament	Tier	Surface	Partner	Opponents	Score
Win	1–0	Dec 2023	ITF Monastir, Tunisia	W15	Hard	(Poland) Malwina Rowinska	Anna Semenova (Turkey) Selina Atay	7–5, 6–1
Win	2–0	Jul 2024	ITF Casablanca, Morocco	W35	Clay	(Morocco) Aya El Aouni	(Switzerland) Chelsea Fontenel (Egypt) Sandra Samir	6–2, 6–2

== Junior Grand Slam finals ==
=== Doubles: 1 (title) ===
Result	Year	Tournament	Surface	Partner	Opponents	Score
Win	2024	US Open	Hard	(Norway) Emily Sartz-Lunde	(Czech Republic) Julie Paštiková (Germany) Julia Stusek	6–2, 4–6, [10–6]
