= Tereza Krejčová =

Czech tennis player (born 2008)

- Country (sports): Czech Republic
- Born: 30 August 2008 (age 18)
- Plays: Right (two-handed backhand)
- Prize money: $5265

Singles
- Highest ranking: No. 1144 (19 May 2026)
- Current ranking: No. 1,414 (28 September 2026)

Grand Slam singles results
- Australian Open Junior: 2R (2025)
- French Open Junior: 1R (2025)
- Wimbledon Junior: 1R (2024)

Doubles
- Career titles: 2 ITF
- Highest ranking: No. 700 (19 May 2026)
- Current ranking: No. 1,510 (28 September 2026)

Grand Slam doubles results
- Australian Open Junior: SF (2025)
- French Open Junior: QF (2025)
- Wimbledon Junior: 1R (2024)
- US Open Junior: SF (2024)
- Last updated on: 10 October 2026.

Tereza Krejčová (born 2008) is a Czech tennis player. She has a career high doubles ranking by the WTA of No. 700 achieved on 19 May 2026. Krejčová has won 2 doubles titles on the ITF Tour

== Career ==
Born in 2008, Krejčová is a member of TK Slavia Plzeň. In February 2024, she won singles and doubles titles in the same weekend at a junior tennis tournament in Trnava, Slovakia.

Alongside Eliška Ticháčková, she reached the semi finals of the 2024 US Open girls' doubles.

Alongside Vendula Valdmannová she reached the semi finals of the 2025 Australian Open girls' doubles, losing to Emerson Jones and Hannah Klugman.

Alongside Denisa Žoldáková she was awarded a wildcard into the women’s doubles at the 2026 Prague Open.

== Personal life ==
Krejčová is from Chodov, Czech Republic.

== ITF Tour Titles ==
=== Doubles: 3 (2 titles, 1 runner-up) ===
Legend
W35 tournaments (1–1)
W15 tournaments (1–0)

Result	W–L	Date	Tournament	Tier	Surface	Partner	Opponents	Score
Win	1–0	Oct 2026	ITF Monastir, Tunisia	W35	Hard	(Poland) Amelia Paszun	(Slovakia) Katarína Kužmová (Poland) Zuzanna Pawlikowska	6–4, 6–4
Loss	1–1	Nov 2026	ITF Liberec, Czech Republic	W35	Hard	(Czech Republic) Alena Kovačková	(Germany) Julia Stusek (Czech Republic) Denisa Žoldáková	6–2, ^{(6)}6–7, [4–10]
Win	2–1	Nov 2026	ITF Monastir, Tunisia	W15	Hard	(Netherlands) Madelief Hageman	(Switzerland) Elsa Bonelli (Switzerland) Noella Manta	6–3, 6–4
