= Paštika =

Paštika (feminine: Paštiková) is a Czech surname, meaning 'pâté'. Notable people with the surname include:

- Julie Paštiková (born 2008), Czech tennis player
- Michaela Paštiková (born 1980), Czech tennis player
