= 2024 US Open – Girls' doubles =

Girls' doubles
- 2024 US Open

Final
- Champions: (Morocco) Malak El Allami (Norway) Emily Sartz-Lunde
- Runners-up: (Czech Republic) Julie Paštiková (Germany) Julia Stusek
- Score: 6–2, 4–6, [10–6]

Events
Singles	men	women		boys	girls
Doubles	men	women	mixed	boys	girls
WC Singles	men	women	quad	boys	girls
WC Doubles	men	women	quad	boys	girls
- US Open

Malak El Allami and Emily Sartz-Lunde won the girls' doubles title at the 2024 US Open, defeating Julie Paštiková and Julia Stusek in the final, 6–2, 4–6, [10–6]. They were the first Moroccan and Norwegian players respectively to win the girls' doubles title.

Mara Gae and Anastasiia Gureva were the reigning champions, but were no longer eligible to participate in junior events.

== Seeds ==
1. (Bulgaria) Iva Ivanova / (Belgium) Jeline Vandromme (quarterfinals, withdrew)
2. (Australia) Emerson Jones / (Italy) Vittoria Paganetti (first round)
3. (Czech Republic) Alena Kovačková / (Japan) Wakana Sonobe (first round)
4. (Bulgaria) Rositsa Dencheva / (Bulgaria) Elizara Yaneva (first round)
5. (United Kingdom) Mika Stojsavljevic / (United Kingdom) Mingge Xu (quarterfinals)
6. (Ukraine) Yelyzaveta Kotliar / (Poland) Monika Stankiewicz (second round)
7. (Netherlands) Joy de Zeeuw / (United Kingdom) Hannah Klugman (semifinals)
8. (Argentina) Luna María Cinalli / (Japan) Mayu Crossley (first round)

== Draw ==
Key

- Q = Qualifier
- WC = Wild card
- LL = Lucky loser
- Alt = Alternate
- ITF = ITF entry
- PR = Protected ranking
- SR = Special ranking
- SE = Special exempt
- JE = Junior exempt
- JR = Junior Accelerator Programme entrant
- CO = College Accelerator Programme entrant
- NG = Next Gen Accelerator Program entrant
- w/o = Walkover
- r = Retired
- d = Defaulted

=== Finals ===
Semifinals
(Czech Republic) Tereza Krejčová (Czech Republic) Eliška Ticháčková	3	4
(Morocco) Malak El Allami (Norway) Emily Sartz-Lunde	6	6
(Czech Republic) Julie Paštiková (Germany) Julia Stusek	1	6	[10]
7	(Netherlands) Joy de Zeeuw (United Kingdom) Hannah Klugman	6	0	[5]

Final
(Morocco) Malak El Allami (Norway) Emily Sartz-Lunde	6	4	[10]
(Czech Republic) Julie Paštiková (Germany) Julia Stusek	2	6	[6]

=== Top half ===
First round
1	(Bulgaria) Iva Ivanova (Belgium) Jeline Vandromme	6	7
(Brazil) Olivia Carneiro (Slovakia) Mia Pohánková	3	5
(Japan) Reina Goto (Sweden) Lea Nilsson	3	6	[6]
(United States) Annika Penickova (United States) Kristina Penickova	6	1	[10]
(Czech Republic) Tereza Krejčová (Czech Republic) Eliška Ticháčková	6	1	[10]
(Spain) Charo Esquiva Bañuls (Lithuania) Laima Vladson	2	6	[7]
WC	(United States) Welles Newman (United States) Margaret Sohns	3	6	[10]
6	(Ukraine) Yelyzaveta Kotliar (Poland) Monika Stankiewicz	6	2	[12]
3	(Czech Republic) Alena Kovačková (Japan) Wakana Sonobe	2	6	[7]
(Morocco) Malak El Allami (Norway) Emily Sartz-Lunde	6	2	[10]
WC	(United States) Claire An (United States) Shannon Lam	7^{7}	7^{7}
(United States) Maya Iyengar (Kazakhstan) Sonja Zhiyenbayeva	6^{2}	6^{0}
WC	(United States) Monika Ekstrand (United States) Mia Slama	6	3	[5]
(South Korea) Jang Ga-eul (Benin) Gloriana Goreti Nahum	4	6	[10]
(Austria) Lilli Tagger (Czech Republic) Vendula Valdmannová	6^{4}	4
5	(United Kingdom) Mika Stojsavljevic (United Kingdom) Mingge Xu	7^{7}	6

Second round
1	(Bulgaria) I Ivanova (Belgium) J Vandromme	6	6
(United States) A Penickova (United States) K Penickova	2	4
(Czech Republic) T Krejčová (Czech Republic) E Ticháčková	6	6
6	(Ukraine) Y Kotliar (Poland) M Stankiewicz	4	3
(Morocco) M El Allami (Norway) E Sartz-Lunde	7^{7}	6
WC	(United States) C An (United States) S Lam	6^{5}	3
(South Korea) G-e Jang (Benin) GG Nahum	6^{5}	5
5	(United Kingdom) M Stojsavljevic (United Kingdom) M Xu	7^{7}	7

Quarterfinals
1	(Bulgaria) I Ivanova (Belgium) J Vandromme
(Czech Republic) T Krejčová (Czech Republic) E Ticháčková	w/o
(Morocco) M El Allami (Norway) E Sartz-Lunde	7	2	[10]
5	(United Kingdom) M Stojsavljevic (United Kingdom) M Xu	5	6	[8]

Semifinals
(Czech Republic) T Krejčová (Czech Republic) E Ticháčková	3	4
(Morocco) M El Allami (Norway) E Sartz-Lunde	6	6

=== Bottom half ===
First round
8	(Argentina) Luna María Cinalli (Japan) Mayu Crossley	0	6^{8}
(Czech Republic) Julie Paštiková (Germany) Julia Stusek	6	7^{10}
(United States) Thea Frodin (United States) Valerie Glozman	3	6	[10]
(Dominican Republic) Anna María Fedotova; Yuliya Perapekhina	6	4	[4]
(United States) Julieta Pareja (United States) Akasha Urhobo	6	6
(Japan) Kanon Sawashiro (Japan) Hikari Yamamoto	2	2
(Brazil) Victória Luiza Barros (Serbia) Teodora Kostović	6	6
4	(Bulgaria) Rositsa Dencheva (Bulgaria) Elizara Yaneva	4	4
7	(Netherlands) Joy de Zeeuw (United Kingdom) Hannah Klugman	6	6
(Italy) Noemi Basiletti (Italy) Gaia Maduzzi	3	2
(United States) Kaitlyn Rolls (Germany) Sonja Zhenikhova	3	4
WC	(United States) Kate Fakih (United States) Alanis Hamilton	6	6
(Kazakhstan) Asylzhan Arystanbekova (France) Ksenia Efremova	4	4
(United States) Capucine Jauffret (United States) Christasha McNeil	6	6
(Czech Republic) Lucie Urbanová (Chile) Antonia Vergara Rivera	6	6
2	(Australia) Emerson Jones (Italy) Vittoria Paganetti	3	0

Second round
(Czech Republic) J Paštiková (Germany) J Stusek	6	6
(United States) T Frodin (United States) V Glozman	3	2
(United States) J Pareja (United States) A Urhobo	1	2
(Brazil) VL Barros (Serbia) T Kostović	6	6
7	(Netherlands) J de Zeeuw (United Kingdom) H Klugman	6	6
WC	(United States) K Fakih (United States) A Hamilton	3	2
(United States) C Jauffret (United States) C McNeil	6	6
(Czech Republic) L Urbanová (Chile) A Vergara Rivera	4	3

Quarterfinals
(Czech Republic) J Paštiková (Germany) J Stusek	7^{7}	6
(Brazil) VL Barros (Serbia) T Kostović	6^{3}	4	-1
7	(Netherlands) J de Zeeuw (United Kingdom) H Klugman	6	6
(United States) C Jauffret (United States) C McNeil	2	3

Semifinals
(Czech Republic) J Paštiková (Germany) J Stusek	1	6	[10]
7	(Netherlands) J de Zeeuw (United Kingdom) H Klugman	6	0	[5]
