= Chodov =

Chodov may refer to places in the Czech Republic:

- Chodov (Domažlice District), a municipality and village in the Plzeň Region
- Chodov (Karlovy Vary District), a municipality and village in the Karlovy Vary Region
- Chodov (Sokolov District), a town in the Karlovy Vary Region
- Chodov (Prague), a district of Prague
  - Chodov (Prague Metro), a metro station in Prague
- Zadní Chodov, a municipality and village in the Plzeň Region
