= Chelsea Fontenel =

Swiss tennis player

- Country (sports): Switzerland
- Born: 25 June 2004 (age 22) Kaiseraugst, Switzerland
- Plays: Right-handed
- Prize money: $38,078

Singles
- Career record: 88–96
- Highest ranking: No. 559 (14 September 2026)
- Current ranking: No. 578 (26 October 2026)

Doubles
- Career record: 57–43
- Career titles: 4 ITF
- Highest ranking: No. 291 (6 October 2025)
- Current ranking: No. 413 (26 October 2026)
- Last updated on: 29 October 2026.

Chelsea Fontenel (born 25 June 2004) is a Swiss tennis player, singer and songwriter.

Fontenel has a career-high singles ranking by the WTA of 635, achieved on 27 July 2026, and a career-high doubles ranking of 291, achieved on 6 October 2025.

== Personal life ==
Born and raised in Kaiseraugst, Fontenel's family originally comes from the Caribbean island of St. Lucia. Her dream is to be the first singing tennis player. Her tennis role models are Serena Williams and Roger Federer.

Fontenel, who enjoys writing and singing songs as well as playing tennis, became known to a wide audience when she participated in the competition program The Voice Kids in 2013 at the age of nine, and thus became the brand ambassador of the Suzuki automobile and motorcycle company. In 2015, she sang at the Match for Africa between Roger Federer and Stan Wawrinka at the Hallenstadion in Zurich. She, IMG, sang the US national anthem at the National College Basketball Finals.

In 2018, Fontenel released her debut single, Showers of Blessings. At the end of the year, Fontenel released her second single, New Day.

She dedicated her song Never Forget You, which she released in 2022, to legendary coach Nick Bollettieri, who founded the IMG Academy, where she met and studied for years when she was 10 years old.

== Tennis career ==
Fontenel played for the University of Georgia Bulldogs women's tennis team starting in the 2022 season. She will be playing for the Arizona State University Sun Devils women's tennis team starting in the 2023/24 season.

Partnering with Ksenia Zaytseva, Fontenel won her first W50 tournament in March 2025 at the ITF event in Bujumbura, Burundi.

== ITF Circuit finals ==
=== Singles: 2 (runner-ups) ===
Legend W15 tournaments (0–2)	Finals by surface Hard (0–2)

Result	W–L	Date	Tournament	Tier	Surface	Opponent	Score
Loss	0–1	Dec 2025	ITF Monastir, Tunisia	W15	Hard	(Greece) Sapfo Sakellaridi	6–4, 4–6, 3–6
Loss	0–2	Nov 2026	ITF Paris, France	W15	Hard (i)	(Croatia) Iva Primorac Pavičić	6–3, 2–6, 4–6

=== Doubles: 14 (5 titles, 9 runner-ups) ===
Legend W50 tournaments (1–2) W35 tournaments (1–4) W15 tournaments (3–3)	Finals by surface Hard (2–4) Clay (3–5)

Result	W–L	Date	Tournament	Tier	Surface	Partner	Opponents	Score
Loss	0–1	Sep 2021	ITF Cancún, Mexico	W15	Hard	(United States) Qavia Lopez	(Mexico) María Portillo Ramírez (Mexico) Victoria Rodríguez	1–6, 1–6
Loss	0–2	May 2022	ITF Daytona Beach, United States	W25	Clay	(United States) Hina Inoue	(Chinese Taipei) Hsieh Yu-chieh (Chinese Taipei) Hsu Chieh-yu	5–7, 0–6
Loss	0–3	Jul 2024	ITF Casablanca, Morocco	W35	Clay	(Egypt) Sandra Samir	(Morocco) Malak El Allami (Morocco) Aya El Aouni	2–6, 2–6
Loss	0–4	Oct 2024	Open de Touraine, France	W35	Hard (i)	(Ukraine) Anastasiia Firman	(United Kingdom) Sarah Beth Grey (Switzerland) Leonie Küng	4–6, 2–6
Loss	0–5	Mar 2025	ITF Alaminos, Cyprus	W15	Clay	(Ukraine) Anastasiia Firman	(Romania) Ștefania Bojică (Switzerland) Marie Mettraux	2–6, 6–4, [7–10]
Win	1–5	Mar 2025	ITF Bujumbura, Burundi	W50	Clay	Ksenia Zaytseva	(Netherlands) Demi Tran (Netherlands) Lian Tran	4–6, 6–1, [11–9]
Win	2–5	May 2025	ITF Merzig, Germany	W15	Clay	(France) Tiphanie Lemaître	(Czech Republic) Ivana Šebestová (Romania) Arina Vasilescu	6–3, 6–3
Loss	2–6	Jun 2025	ITF Stuttgart-Vaihingen, Germany	W35	Clay	Alevtina Ibragimova	(Greece) Martha Matoula (Slovakia) Radka Zelníčková	6–7^{(5)}, 5–7
Loss	2–7	Jul 2025	ITF Aschaffenburg, Germany	W50	Clay	(Germany) Laura Boehner	(United States) Rasheeda McAdoo (Kenya) Angella Okutoyi	6–1, 2–6, [7–10]
Win	3–7	Jul 2025	ITF Darmstadt, Germany	W35	Clay	(France) Marie Mattel	(Chile) Fernanda Labraña (Brazil) Rebeca Pereira	6–3, 6–4
Loss	3–8	Apr 2026	ITF Monastir, Tunisia	W15	Hard	(United Kingdom) Esther Adeshina	(Belgium) Kaat Coppez (Netherlands) Sarah van Emst	2–6, 2–6
Win	4–8	Apr 2026	ITF Monastir, Tunisia	W15	Hard	(Poland) Amelia Paszun	(Italy) Lavinia Luciano (Italy) Matilde Mariani	7–5, 4–6, [10–7]
Loss	4–9	Aug 2026	ITF Leiria, Portugal	W50	Hard	(Netherlands) Stéphanie Visscher	(United Kingdom) Madeleine Brooks (United Kingdom) Amelia Rajecki	4–6, 6–7^{(1)}
Win	5–9	Nov 2026	ITF Paris, France	W15	Hard (i)	(Germany) Marie Vogt	(Canada) Françoise Abanda (France) Marie Mattel	6–4, 7–5
