= Julie Paštiková =

Czech tennis player

- Country (sports): Czech Republic
- Born: 31 May 2008
- Prize money: $28,486

Singles
- Career record: 48–32
- Career titles: 1 ITF
- Highest ranking: No. 496 (29 June 2026)
- Current ranking: No. 496 (29 June 2026)

Grand Slam singles results
- Australian Open Junior: 2R (2024)
- French Open Junior: 2R (2025)
- Wimbledon Junior: 1R (2024, 2025)
- US Open Junior: 2R (2024)

Doubles
- Career record: 14–15
- Career titles: 1 ITF
- Highest ranking: No. 573 (4 May 2026)
- Current ranking: No. 582 (29 June 2026)

Grand Slam doubles results
- Australian Open Junior: F (2024)
- French Open Junior: QF (2024)
- Wimbledon Junior: SF (2024, 2025)
- US Open Junior: F (2024)
- Last updated on: 29 June 2026.

Julie Paštiková (born 31 May 2008) is a Czech tennis player. She has a career-high WTA singles ranking of No. 496, achieved on 29 June 2026.

== Personal life ==
She is from Prostějov.

== Career ==
=== Junior years ===
Playing alongside Julia Stusek, she reached the final of the girls' doubles at the 2024 Australian Open, where they lost in straight sets to American players Tyra Caterina Grant and Iva Jovic.

Alongside Stusek, she reached the semifinals of the girls' doubles at the 2024 Wimbledon Championships but were defeated by British pair Mingge Xu and Mika Stojsavljevic. With Stusek, she also reached the final of the 2024 US Open in September 2024, losing to Malak El Allami from Morocco and Norwegian Emily Sartz-Lunde.

In her final singles matches as a junior, Paštiková won the Pardubice junior singles championship in the Czech Republic in August 2025, and then lost to Hannah Klugman in the third round of the girls' singles at the 2025 US Open, before turning professional.

=== Professional ===
==== 2025: First ITF tournament victory ====
Paštiková won her first singles title on the ITF Women's Tour in October 2025 as a 17 year-old, at the W35 Santa Margherita di Pula on clay courts in Sardinia, having come through qualifying to play in the main draw. She went on to defeat Sweden's Lisa Zaar in the semifinal and Tena Lukas of Croatia in the final.

Paštiková ended the 2025 season with a narrow three set defeat to world No. 75, Gabriela Ruse in Trnava, and concluded the year with her ranking risen to world No. 516.

==== 2026: First match win on WTA Tour ====
Paštiková was awarded a wildcard into the qualifying at the 2026 Ostrava Open, losing to experienced German Mona Barthel. That week, she claimed her first WTA Tour-level match win in the women’s doubles at the event, partnering Vendula Valdmannová and winning a match-tiebreak against Giuliana Olmos and Aldila Sutjiadi in the first round.

== ITF Circuit finals ==
=== Singles: 2 (1 title, 1 runner-up) ===
Legend W35 tournaments (1–1)	Finals by surface Clay (1–1)

Result	W–L	Date	Tournament	Tier	Surface	Opponent	Score
Win	1–0	Oct 2025	ITF Santa Margherita di Pula, Italy	W35	Clay	(Croatia) Tena Lukas	6–2, 4–6, 6–2
Loss	1–1	Jun 2026	ITF Bolszewo, Poland	W35	Clay	(Germany) Joëlle Steur	3–6, 5–7

=== Doubles: 1 (title) ===
Legend W15 tournaments (1–0)	Finals by surface Clay (1–0)

Result	W–L	Date	Tournament	Tier	Surface	Partner	Opponents	Score
Win	1–0	Aug 2024	ITF Slovenske Konjice, Slovenia	W15	Clay	(Czech Republic) Alena Kovačková	(Slovenia) Petja Drame (Slovenia) Tara Gorinšek	6–2, 6–3

== Junior Grand Slam tournament finals ==
=== Doubles: 2 (2 runner-ups) ===
Result	Year	Tournament	Surface	Partner	Opponents	Score
Loss	2024	Australian Open	Hard	(Germany) Julia Stusek	(United States) Iva Jovic (United States) Tyra Caterina Grant	3–6, 1–6
Loss	2024	US Open	Hard	(Germany) Julia Stusek	(Norway) Emily Sartz-Lunde (Morocco) Malak El Allami	2–6, 6–4, [6–10]
