= Alena Kovačková =

Czech tennis player (born 2008)

- Country (sports): Czech Republic
- Born: 13 June 2008 (age 18) Trutnov, Czech Republic
- Plays: Right (two-handed backhand)
- Prize money: US$ 47,624

Singles
- Career record: 71–36
- Career titles: 0
- Highest ranking: No. 385 (13 July 2026)
- Current ranking: No. 393 (24 August 2026)

Doubles
- Career record: 53–12
- Career titles: 11 ITF
- Highest ranking: No. 175 (24 August 2026)
- Current ranking: No. 176 (31 August 2026)
- Last updated on: 31 August 2026.

Alena Kovačková (born 13 June 2008) is a Czech tennis player. She has a career-high WTA singles ranking of No. 385, achieved on 13 July 2026 and a doubles ranking of No. 175, reached on 24 August 2026.

Kovačková has won three major junior titles in doubles, two of them with her sister Jana.

== Junior career ==
In October 2022, whilst ranked No. 1 European in the Girls U-14, Kovačková won the U-16 title at the Tennis Europe Masters in Monte Carlo, Monaco. Later that year she became the first girl to win both the U14 and U16 "Player of the Year" awards in the same year.

In July 2023, she won her first junior-level major, in the girls' doubles category at 2023 Wimbledon, playing alongside compatriot Laura Samsonová. They defeated British pair Hannah Klugman and Isabelle Lacy in the final. It was the first Czech pairing to win that event since Barbora Krejčíková and Kateřina Siniaková title a decade before.

Next season, as top-seeds and defending champions, Kovačková and Samsonová reached the quarterfinals at 2024 Wimbledon, where they lost to seventh seeds Mika Stojsavljevic and Mingge Xu.

Kovačková played in the girls' doubles event at the 2025 Australian Open, with her sister Jana. The pair reached the semifinals, where they lost to American twin sisters Kristina and Annika Penickova. A few months later, the Czech pair avenged that loss, defeating the American twins on their runners-up campaign at the 2025 French Open, where they lost to German pair Eva Bennemann and Sonja Zhenikhova in the final. Later that season, Kovačková and her sister were crowned champions at a major jr., winning the girls' doubles category at the 2025 US Open. The Czech sisters defeated fourth seeds Laima Vladson and Jeline Vandromme in straight sets.

Partnering again with her sister, Kovačková won the girls' doubles at the 2026 Australian Open. The pair did not drop a set on their run and defeated Tereza Heřmanová and Denisa Žoldáková in a first all-Czech junior final.

She reached a junior combined ranking of world No. 5, on 2 February 2026.

=== Grand Slam performance ===
Singles:

- Australian Open: 3R (2025, 2026)
- French Open: 3R (2025)
- Wimbledon: 2R (2025)
- US Open: 2R (2023, 2024)

Doubles:

- Australian Open: W (2026)
- French Open: F (2025)
- Wimbledon: W (2023)
- US Open: W (2025)

== Professional career ==
=== 2024: First professional matches ===
In 2024, Kovačková played her first ITF tournament main draw, reaching her first semifinal in Sharm El Sheik, losing to Slovak Renáta Jamrichová. In her next event, she reached another semifinal in Antalya, Türkiye.

In July, Kovačková had her first experience at a WTA Tour event. She received a wildcard into the qualifying draw of the Prague Open, but lost in the first round to former champion Mona Barthel, in straight sets.

In August, Kovačková reached her third and fourth singles semifinals at back-to-back events in Slovenia, losing to Pia Lovrič in both occasions. She won her first and second doubles titles at those events.

=== 2025: WTA Tour main-draw debut ===
In early 2025, Kovačková reached just one quarterfinal in singles but won another two titles, including her first title with younger sister Jana and the biggest title of her career in Česká Lípa at the W75 Macha Lake Open, with Ivana Šebestová.

In July, Kovačková was again awarded a wildcard to qualify for the Prague Open. This time, she defeated two former top-100 players, Arina Rodionova and Lucrezia Stefanini, to make her WTA Tour main-draw debut at the age of 17.

== Personal life ==
Kovačková's father, Petr Kovačka, was a tennis player. She has a younger sister, Jana, who is also a tennis player.

== ITF Circuit finals ==
=== Singles: 5 (5 runner-ups) ===
Legend W50 tournaments (0–1) W35 tournaments (0–2) W15 tournaments (0–2)	Finals by surface Hard (0–1) Clay (0–4)

Result	W–L	Date	Tournament	Tier	Surface	Opponent	Score
Loss	0–1	Aug 2025	ITF Slovenske Konjice, Slovenia	W15	Clay	(Germany) Eva Marie Voracek	7–5, 3–6, 1–6
Loss	0–2	Aug 2025	ITF Monastir, Tunisia	W15	Hard	(Belgium) Jeline Vandromme	2–6, 1–6
Loss	0–3	Apr 2026	ITF Santa Margherita di Pula, Italy	W35	Clay	(Italy) Tyra Caterina Grant	4–6, 2–6
Loss	0–4	Sep 2026	ITF Santa Margherita di Pula, Italy	W35	Clay	(Czech Republic) Alisa Oktiabreva	5–7, 3–6
Loss	0–5	Oct 2026	ITF Stara Zagora, Bulgaria	W50	Clay	(Turkey) İpek Öz	2–6, 5–7

=== Doubles: 15 (13 titles, 2 runner-up) ===
Legend W75 tournaments (3–0) W50 tournaments (3–0) W35 tournaments (2–2) W15 tournaments (5–0)	Finals by surface Hard (3–2) Clay (10–0)

Result	W–L	Date	Tournament	Tier	Surface	Partner	Opponents	Score
Win	1–0	Jul 2024	ITF Rogaška Slatina, Slovenia	W15	Clay	(Netherlands) Joy de Zeeuw	(Slovakia) Anika Jašková (Czech Republic) Karolína Vlčková	4–6, 6–4, [10–7]
Win	2–0	Aug 2024	ITF Slovenske Konjice, Slovenia	W15	Clay	(Czech Republic) Julie Paštiková	(Slovenia) Petja Drame (Slovenia) Tara Gorinšek	6–2, 6–3
Win	3–0	Apr 2025	ITF Antalya, Turkiye	W15	Clay	(Czech Republic) Jana Kovačková	(Romania) Ștefania Bojică (Czech Republic) Linda Ševčíková	5–7, 6–4, [10–4]
Win	4–0	Jun 2025	Macha Lake Open, Czech Republic	W75	Clay	(Czech Republic) Ivana Šebestová	(Bulgaria) Lia Karatancheva (Czech Republic) Aneta Kučmová	1–6, 7–5, [10–5]
Win	5–0	Aug 2025	ITF Monastir, Tunisia	W15	Hard	(Czech Republic) Jana Kovačková	(Bulgaria) Iva Ivanova (Belgium) Jeline Vandromme	7–5, 6–2
Win	6–0	Aug 2025	ITF Monastir, Tunisia (2)	W15	Hard	(Czech Republic) Jana Kovačková	(France) Yasmine Mansouri (Serbia) Elena Milovanović	7–6^{(2)}, 6–4
Loss	6–1	Nov 2025	ITF Liberec, Czech Republic	W35	Hard (i)	(Czech Republic) Denisa Hindová	(Croatia) Lucija Ćirić Bagarić (Czech Republic) Lucie Havlíčková	1–6, 1–6
Win	7–1	Feb 2026	Prague Open, Czech Republic	W75	Hard (i)	(Czech Republic) Jana Kovačková	(United Kingdom) Madeleine Brooks (United Kingdom) Amelia Rajecki	6–4, 6–3
Win	8–1	Mar 2026	ITF Heraklion, Greece	W50	Clay	(Czech Republic) Jana Kovačková	(Bulgaria) Rositsa Dencheva (Italy) Vittoria Paganetti	6–4, 6–3
Win	9–1	Apr 2026	ITF Santa Margherita di Pula, Italy	W35	Clay	(Czech Republic) Jana Kovačková	(Italy) Deborah Chiesa (Malta) Francesca Curmi	6–1, 6–3
Win	10–1	Jun 2026	Macha Lake Open, Czech Republic (2)	W75	Clay	(Czech Republic) Jana Kovačková	(United States) Hibah Shaikh (United States) Allura Zamarripa	6–4, 6–1
Win	11–1	Aug 2026	Prague Open, Czech Republic	W50	Clay	(Czech Republic) Jana Kovačková	(Ukraine) Valeriya Strakhova; Anastasia Tikhonova	6–2, 6–3
Win	12–1	Sep 2026	ITF Santa Margherita di Pula, Italy	W35	Clay	(Germany) Joëlle Steur	(Kenya) Angella Okutoyi (Ukraine) Daria Yesypchuk	6–3, 6–1
Win	13–1	Oct 2026	ITF Burgas, Bulgaria	W50	Clay	(Czech Republic) Jana Kovačková	(Romania) Maia Ilinca Burcescu (Germany) Sonja Zhenikhova	6–4, 7–5
Loss	13–2	Nov 2026	ITF Liberec, Czech Republic	W35	Hard (i)	(Czech Republic) Tereza Krejčová	(Germany) Julia Stusek (Czech Republic) Denisa Žoldáková	6–2, 6–7^{(6)}, [4–10]

== Junior Grand Slam tournament finals ==
=== Doubles: 4 (3 titles, 1 runner-up) ===
Result	Year	Tournament	Surface	Partner	Opponents	Score
Win	2023	Wimbledon	Grass	(Czech Republic) Laura Samsonová	(United Kingdom) Hannah Klugman (United Kingdom) Isabelle Lacy	6–4, 7–5
Loss	2025	French Open	Clay	(Czech Republic) Jana Kovačková	(Germany) Eva Bennemann (Germany) Sonja Zhenikhova	6–4, 4–6, [8–10]
Win	2025	US Open	Hard	(Czech Republic) Jana Kovačková	(Lithuania) Laima Vladson (Belgium) Jeline Vandromme	6–2, 6–2
Win	2026	Australian Open	Hard	(Czech Republic) Jana Kovačková	(Czech Republic) Tereza Heřmanová (Czech Republic) Denisa Žoldáková	6–1, 6–3
