= Zadní Chodov =

- Municipality
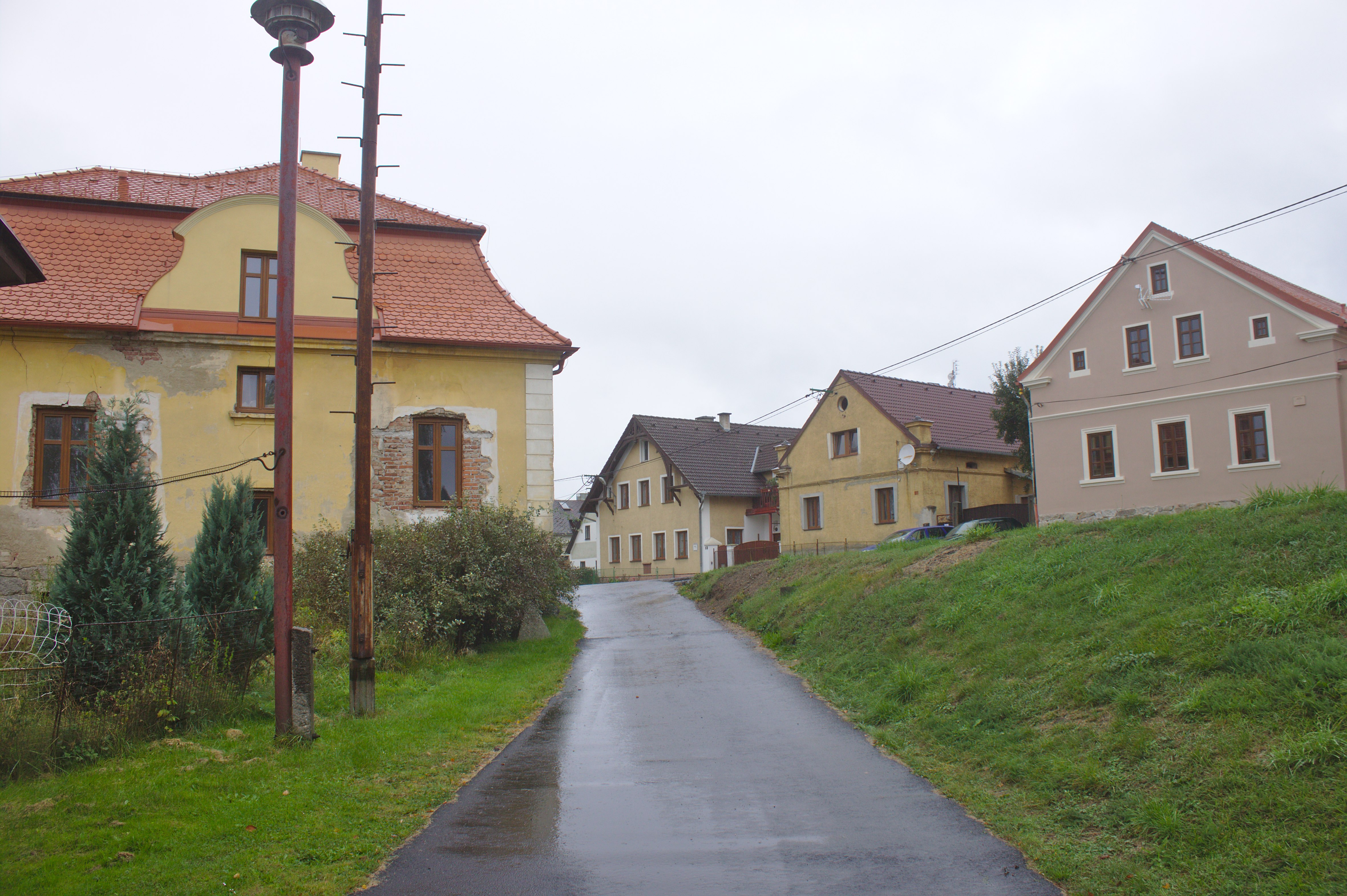
- Houses in Zadní Chodov

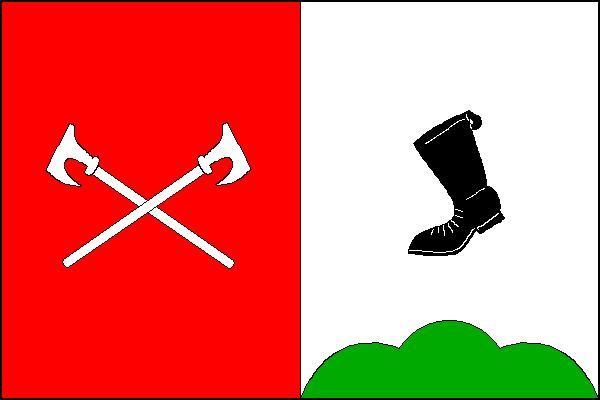
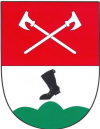
- Flag Coat of arms

- Location in the Czech Republic
- Coordinates: 49°53′26″N 12°39′17″E
- Country: Czech Republic
- Region: Plzeň
- District: Tachov
- First mentioned: 1365

Area
  - Total: 13.88 km^{2} (5.36 sq mi)
- Elevation: 517 m (1,696 ft)

Population (2026-01-01)
  - Total: 240
  - Density: 17/km^{2} (45/sq mi)
- Time zone: UTC+1 (CET)
  - Summer (DST): UTC+2 (CEST)
- Postal code: 348 15
- Website: www.zadnichodov.cz

Zadní Chodov (German: Hinter Kotten) is a municipality and village in Tachov District in the Plzeň Region of the Czech Republic. It has about 200 inhabitants.

Zadní Chodov lies approximately 11 kilometres (7 mi) north of Tachov, 56 km (35 mi) west of Plzeň, and 130 km (81 mi) west of Prague.

== Administrative division ==
Zadní Chodov consists of two municipal parts (in brackets population according to the 2021 census):

- Zadní Chodov (173)
- Kyjov (48)

== Demographics ==
Historical population
Year	Pop.	±%
1869	875	—
1880	914	+4.5%
1890	952	+4.2%
1900	959	+0.7%
1910	958	−0.1%
1921	924	−3.5%
1930	922	−0.2%
1950	338	−63.3%
1961	368	+8.9%
1970	328	−10.9%
1980	291	−11.3%
1991	305	+4.8%
2001	288	−5.6%
2011	242	−16.0%
2021	221	−8.7%
Source: Censuses
