= Mika Stojsavljevic =

British tennis player (born 2008)

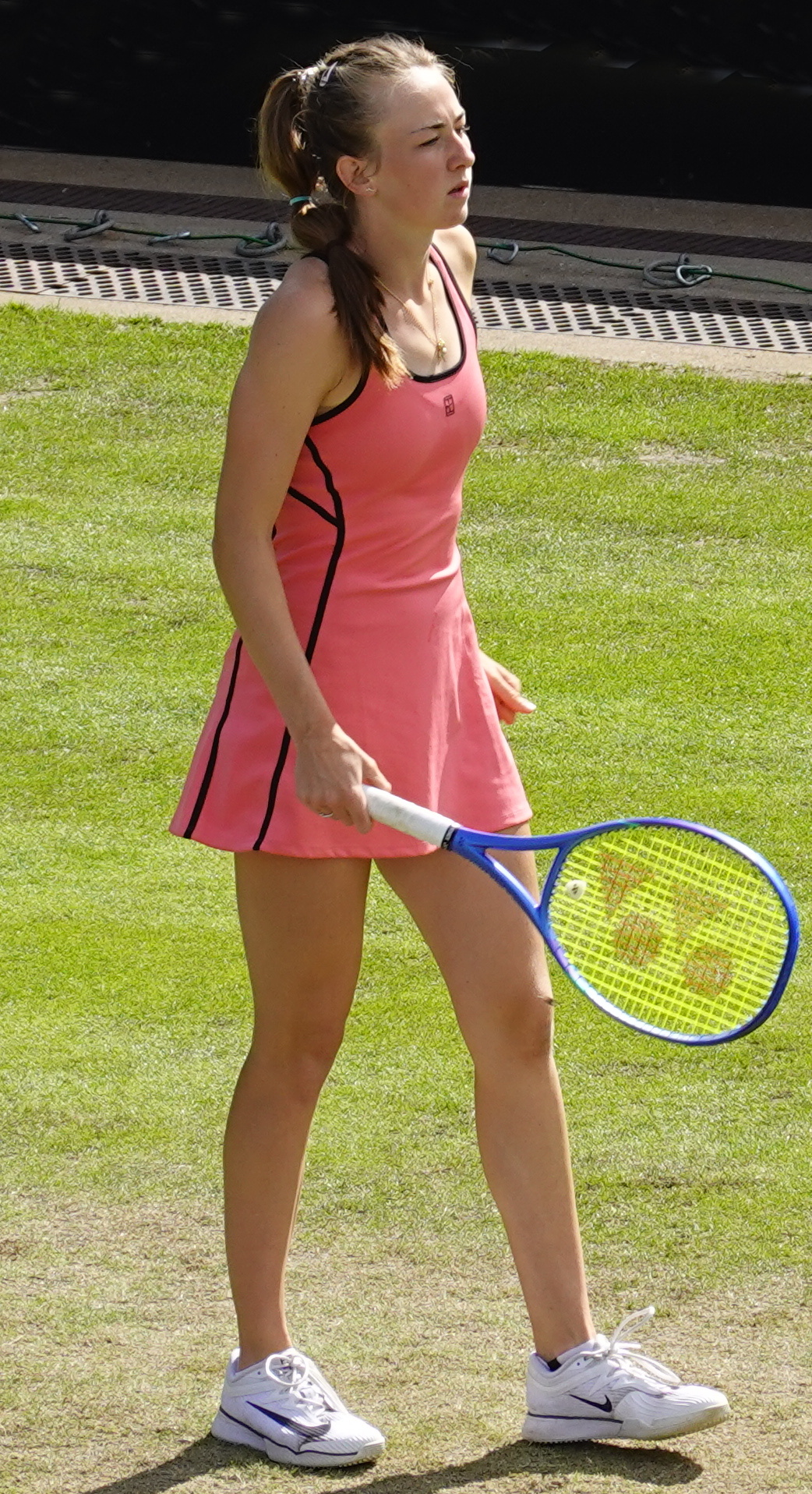
- Stojsavljevic at the 2026 Birmingham Open
- Country (sports): United Kingdom
- Residence: Ealing, London, UK
- Born: 15 December 2008 (age 17) London, England, UK
- Height: 6 ft 1 in (1.85 m)
- Turned pro: 2025
- Plays: Right (two-handed backhand)
- Prize money: $325,515

Singles
- Career record: 52–44
- Career titles: 2 ITF
- Highest ranking: No. 261 (8 June 2026)
- Current ranking: No. 411 (26 October 2026)

Grand Slam singles results
- Wimbledon: 1R (2025, 2026)

Doubles
- Career record: 22–17
- Career titles: 2 ITF
- Highest ranking: No. 255 (14 September 2026)
- Current ranking: No. 278 (26 October 2026)

Grand Slam doubles results
- Wimbledon: 1R (2025, 2026)
- Last updated on: 26 October 2026.

Mika Stojsavljevic (born 15 December 2008) is a British tennis player. She won the girls' singles title at the 2024 US Open.

== Early life ==
Stojsavljevic was born in London to a Serbian father from Velika Popina in Croatia and a Polish mother from Warsaw. She was raised in Ealing, where she attended St Benedict's School. She later moved to train at the LTA national academy in Loughborough, and currently attends Loughborough Amherst School. Growing up, she idolised Maria Sharapova.

== Career ==
=== Juniors ===
==== 2023: Wimbledon singles quarterfinal ====
In April 2023, she reached the final of the LTA National Junior Championships where she lost to Hannah Klugman.

Competing as a 14 year-old at the girls' singles of the 2023 Wimbledon Championships, Stojsavljevic secured a big win over fourth seed and French Open junior finalist, Lucciana Pérez, and Australian 14th seed, Emerson Jones, reaching the quarterfinals.

==== US Open title & Wimbledon doubles final ====
In April 2024, Stojsavljevic and Mimi Xu paired up to win in three sets over Flora Johnson & Allegra Korpanec Davies in the girls' doubles at the U18 Junior National Championships. On the same day, Xu defeated Stojsavljevic in the semifinals of the girls' singles. In June 2024, playing alongside Xu, Stojsavljevic reached the final of the girls' doubles at the 2024 Wimbledon Championships, after a win over top seeds and defending champions, Alena Kovačková and Laura Samson in the quarterfinals and a straight sets win over Julia Stusek and Julie Paštiková in the semifinal. In the final, they lost on a champions tiebreak to Tyra Caterina Grant and Iva Jovic of the United States.

Alongside Mimi Xu, she reached the quarterfinals of the girls' doubles at the 2024 US Open. Completing in the girls' singles of the 2024 US Open, she defeated top seed Emerson Jones and third seed Iva Jovic to reach the final, in which she defeated Wakana Sonobe of Japan in straight sets. In doing so, she became the first British player to win the girls' singles final at the US Open since Heather Watson in 2009.

In October, Stojsavljevic finished fourth in the girls' singles at the ITF World Tour Junior Finals in Chengdou, China, which was the best result by a Briton at the event since Katie Swan finished runner-up in 2016.

=== 2024: Turning pro, WTA Tour debut ===
In April 2024, aged 15, Stojsavljevic defeated two-time Wimbledon quarterfinalist Tamira Paszek in two sets to reach the final of the W35 Nottingham event. She went on to win her first ITF singles title by overcoming Julie Belgraver of France in the final.

She was awarded a wildcard into qualifying for the singles of the 2024 Wimbledon Championships but lost her first-round match to Séléna Janicijevic.

Stojsavljevic was also given a wildcard entry into the Pan Pacific Open in Tokyo, losing in the first round to world No. 57, Moyuka Uchijima, in a deciding set tie-break.

=== 2025–2026: Major & BJK Cup debuts ===
Stojsavljevic was awarded a wildcard to make her major tournament main-draw debut at Wimbledon in June 2025, losing to 31st seed Ashlyn Krueger in the first round.

In April 2026, she made her debut for the Great Britain Billie Jean King Cup team in Melbourne in their qualifier against Australia, defeating world No. 56, Talia Gibson, in the opening singles match, in straight sets.

In June 2026, competing at the Birmingham Open, Stojsavljevic became the youngest woman to reach the quarterfinals at the tournament with a three-set win against Elvina Kalieva, for her first WTA 125 quarterfinal, aged 17. However, she lost in the last eight to Nikola Bartůňková, in three sets. Given a wildcard entry into the main draw at Wimbledon, Stojsavljevic lost to 11th seed Belinda Bencic in the first round.

In October 2026, she was given a wildcard entry into the Pan Pacific Open, losing to eighth seed Alexandra Eala in the first round. The following month, as a lucky loser at the 2026 Hong Kong Tennis Open, Stojsavljevic defeated former Australian Open champion Sofia Kenin in three sets to record her first main-draw match win on the WTA Tour, despite Kenin being ranked 224 places higher and only having an hour's notice that she would be playing. She lost to world No. 67 Zeynep Sönmez in the second round.

== ITF Circuit finals ==
=== Singles: 4 (2 titles, 2 runner-ups) ===
Legend W100 tournaments (0–1) W35 tournaments (2–1)	Finals by surface Hard (2–2)

Result	W–L	Date	Tournament	Tier	Surface	Opponent	Score
Win	1–0	Apr 2024	ITF Nottingham, United Kingdom	W35	Hard	(France) Julie Belgraver	7–6^{(7)}, 6–3
Loss	1–1	Sep 2025	ITF Monastir, Tunisia	W35	Hard	(Czech Republic) Vendula Valdmannová	1–6, 1–6
Win	2–1	Oct 2025	ITF Birmingham, UK	W35	Hard (i)	(Slovakia) Katarína Kužmová	6–4, 6–0
Loss	2–2	Oct 2025	Wrexham Open, UK	W100	Hard (i)	(United Kingdom) Mimi Xu	3–6, 5–7

=== Doubles: 4 (2 titles, 2 runner-ups) ===
Legend W75 tournaments (0–2) W50 tournaments (1–0) W35 tournaments (1–0)	Finals by surface Hard (2–2)

Result	W–L	Date	Tournament	Tier	Surface	Partner	Opponent	Score
Win	1–0	Sep 2025	ITF Monastir, Tunisia	W35	Hard	(Czech Republic) Vendula Valdmannová	(United Kingdom) Lauryn John-Baptiste (Egypt) Sandra Samir	6–4, 6–4
Loss	1–1	Nov 2025	ITF Fujairah, United Arab Emirates	W75	Hard	(Australia) Olivia Gadecki	(Slovakia) Viktória Hrunčáková (Czech Republic) Vendula Valdmannová	4–6, 3–6
Loss	1–2	Jan 2026	ITF Leszno, Poland	W75	Hard (i)	(Czech Republic) Vendula Valdmannová	(United Kingdom) Madeleine Brooks (United Kingdom) Amelia Rajecki	6–7^{(2)}, 6–7^{(6)}
Win	2–2	Mar 2026	Open de Seine-et-Marne, France	W50	Hard (i)	(Czech Republic) Vendula Valdmannová	(United Kingdom) Madeleine Brooks (United Kingdom) Amelia Rajecki	7–6^{(4)}, 4–6, [10–4]

== Junior Grand Slam tournament finals ==
=== Singles: 1 (title) ===
Result	Year	Tournament	Surface	Opponent	Score
Win	2024	US Open	Hard	(Japan) Wakana Sonobe	6–4, 6–4

=== Doubles: 1 (runner-up) ===
Result	Year	Tournament	Surface	Partner	Opponents	Score
Loss	2024	Wimbledon	Grass	(United Kingdom) Mimi Xu	(United States) Tyra Caterina Grant (United States) Iva Jovic	5–7, 6–4, [8–10]
