= Julia Stusek =

German tennis player (born 2008)

- Country (sports): Germany
- Born: 30 June 2008 (age 18) Rheinfelden, Germany
- Plays: Right-handed (two-handed backhand)
- Prize money: $63,244

Singles
- Career record: 66–45
- Career titles: 1 ITF
- Highest ranking: No. 359 (16 November 2026)
- Current ranking: No. 359 (16 November 2026)

Grand Slam singles results
- Australian Open Junior: 3R (2025)
- French Open Junior: QF (2025)
- Wimbledon Junior: 2R (2024, 2025)
- US Open Junior: QF (2025)

Doubles
- Career record: 23–10
- Career titles: 4 ITF
- Highest ranking: No. 347 (16 November 2026)
- Current ranking: No. 347 (16 November 2026)

Grand Slam doubles results
- Australian Open Junior: F (2024)
- French Open Junior: QF (2024)
- Wimbledon Junior: SF (2024, 2025)
- US Open Junior: F (2024)
- Last updated on: 16 November 2026.

Julia Stusek (born 30 June 2008) is a German tennis player. She has a career-high WTA singles ranking of world No. 359, achieved on 16 November 2026, and a best doubles ranking of No. 347, also attained on 16 November 2026.

She is the daughter of former professional tennis player Petra Holubová and her father "Tomas" runs a tennis school. Due to her Czech parents, she speaks fluent Czech.

== Career ==
Stusek is occasionally coached by Melanie Molitor, the mother of former world No. 1, Martina Hingis.

She made her WTA Tour main-draw debut as a lucky loser at the 2024 Bad Homburg Open, where she lost in the first round to Peyton Stearns.

== ITF Circuit finals ==
=== Singles: 2 (1 title, 1 runner-up) ===
Legend W35 tournaments (1–1) W15 tournaments	Finals by surface Hard (0–1) Clay (1–0)

Result	W–L	Date	Tournament	Tier	Surface	Opponent	Score
Win	1–0	Jun 2026	ITF Klosters, Switzerland	W35	Clay	(Spain) Berta Passola	7–5, 2–6, 7–6^{(13–11)}
Loss	1–1	Nov 2026	ITF Liberec, Czech Republic	W35	Hard (i)	(Poland) Weronika Ewald	2–6, 1–0 ret.

=== Doubles: 4 (4 titles) ===
Legend W35 tournaments (2–0) W15 tournaments (2–0)	Finals by surface Hard (1–0) Clay (1–0) Carpet (2–0)

Result	W–L	Date	Tournament	Tier	Surface	Partner	Opponents	Score
Win	1–0	Nov 2025	ITF Solarino, Italy	W15	Carpet	(Germany) Victoria Pohle	(Iran) Meshkatolzahra Safi (Germany) Vivien Sandberg	7–5, 6–2
Win	2–0	Nov 2025	ITF Solarino, Italy	W15	Carpet	(Germany) Victoria Pohle	(Switzerland) Nicole Gadient (Germany) Anja Wildgruber	6–0, 6–1
Win	3–0	Jun 2026	ITF Nice, France	W35	Clay	(Switzerland) Alina Granwehr	Arina Bulatova; Alevtina Ibragimova	5–7, 7–6^{(12–10)}, [10–4]
Win	4–0	Nov 2026	ITF Liberec, Czech Republic	W35	Hard (i)	(Czech Republic) Denisa Žoldáková	(Czech Republic) Alena Kovačková (Czech Republic) Tereza Krejčová	2–6, 7–6^{(8–6)}, [10–4]

== Junior Grand Slam tournament finals ==
=== Doubles: 2 (2 runner-ups) ===
Result	Year	Tournament	Surface	Partner	Opponents	Score
Loss	2024	Australian Open	Hard	(Czech Republic) Julie Paštiková	(United States) Iva Jovic (United States) Tyra Caterina Grant	3–6, 1–6
Loss	2024	US Open	Hard	(Czech Republic) Julie Paštiková	(Norway) Emily Sartz-Lunde (Morocco) Malak El Allami	2–6, 6–4, [6–10]
