= Denisa Žoldáková =

Czech tennis player

- Country (sports): Czech Republic
- Born: 1 January 2008 (age 18)
- Prize money: US$ 8,432

Singles
- Highest ranking: No. 672 (20 July 2026)
- Current ranking: No. 672 (20 July 2026)

Grand Slam singles results
- Australian Open Junior: QF (2026)
- French Open Junior: 3R (2026)
- Wimbledon Junior: 2R (2026)

Doubles
- Highest ranking: No. 933 (18 May 2026)
- Current ranking: No. 962 (20 July 2026)

Grand Slam doubles results
- Australian Open Junior: F (2026)
- Wimbledon Junior: SF (2026)
- Last updated on: 22 July 2026.

Denisa Žoldáková is a Czech tennis player. She has a career high singles ranking by the WTA of No. 672, achieved on 20 July 2026. As to her career high doubles ranking, she reached No. 933 on 18 May 2026.

== Early life ==
Having started playing tennis at the SK Hamr club, Žoldáková became a member of the LTC Houštka club for two years and also trained at the Piatti Tennis Centre in Italy. Currently, she is member of the I. ČLTK Prague.

== Career ==
Žoldáková is coached by Zdeněk Kubík, who previously coached Markéta Vondroušová. Her first junior grand slam appearance came in qualifying for the 2025 Wimbledon Championships, where she lost to Swede Lea Nilsson. After winning junior tournaments in Vigo and Oslo that year she played on the ITF Women’s Tennis Tour in Szabolcsveresmart, Hungary, where she advanced to the quarterfinals in singles and won the doubles tournament with Polish player Maja Pawelska.

Žoldáková reached the final of the girls' doubles at the 2026 Australian Open, playing alongside her compatriot Tereza Heřmanová, where they faced fellow Czech players and eventual winners Alena and Jana Kovačková. Žoldáková's run in the girls' singles at the championships ended in the quarter-finals as she lost to Chinese player Sun Xinran, who was seeded sixth. In March 2026, Žoldáková reached her first professional singles final in Egypt at the W15 level, losing to Russian Ekaterina Tupitsyna in the final.

In July 2026, playing alongside German Ida Wobker, she reached the semi-finals of the girl's doubles at the 2026 Wimbledon Championships, losing to eventual winners Jana Kovačková and Kateřina Zajíčková.

Alongside Tereza Krejčová she was awarded a wildcard into the women’s doubles at the 2026 Prague Open.

== Junior Grand Slam tournament finals ==
=== Doubles: 1 (runner-up) ===
Result	Year	Tournament	Surface	Partner	Opponents	!Score
Loss	2026	Australian Open	Hard	(Czech Republic) Tereza Heřmanová	(Czech Republic) Alena Kovačková (Czech Republic) Jana Kovačková	1–6, 3–6
