= 2024 Bengaluru Open – Doubles =

Doubles
- 2024 Bengaluru Open

Final
- Champions: (India) Saketh Myneni (India) Ramkumar Ramanathan
- Runners-up: (France) Constantin Bittoun Kouzmine (France) Maxime Janvier
- Score: 6–3, 6–4

Events
Singles	Doubles
← 2023 ·	Bengaluru Open	· 2025 →

Chung Yun-seong and Hsu Yu-hsiou were the defending champions but only Chung chose to defend his title, partnering Dan Added. Chung lost in the first round to Tristan Schoolkate and Adam Walton.

The Indian pair of Saketh Myneni and Ramkumar Ramanathan won the title after defeating the French duo Constantin Bittoun Kouzmine and Maxime Janvier 6–3, 6–4 in the final.

== Seeds ==
1. (France) Dan Added / (South Korea) Chung Yun-seong (first round)
2. (Poland) Piotr Matuszewski / (Australia) Matthew Romios (semifinals)
3. (India) Sriram Balaji / (Germany) Andre Begemann (first round)
4. (India) Rithvik Choudary Bollipalli / (India) Niki Kaliyanda Poonacha (first round)

== Draw ==
Key

- Q = Qualifier
- WC = Wild card
- LL = Lucky loser
- Alt = Alternate
- ITF = ITF entry
- PR = Protected ranking
- SR = Special ranking
- SE = Special exempt
- JE = Junior exempt
- JR = Junior Accelerator Programme entrant
- CO = College Accelerator Programme entrant
- NG = Next Gen Accelerator Program entrant
- w/o = Walkover
- r = Retired
- d = Defaulted

First round
1	(France) D Added (South Korea) Y-s Chung	3	3
(Australia) T Schoolkate (Australia) A Walton	6	6
(South Korea) S-c Hong (Hong Kong) C Wong	1	6	[5]
(Philippines) FC Alcantara (Japan) K Uchida	6	1	[10]
3	(India) S Balaji (Germany) A Begemann	6	4	[10]
(Germany) J Schnaitter (Germany) M Wallner	3	6	[12]
WC	(India) S Banthia (India) SDP Dev	0	6^{2}
(India) S Myneni (India) R Ramanathan	6	7^{7}
WC	(India) Sai Karteek Reddy Ganta (India) Manish Sureshkumar	2	6^{8}
Alt	(France) C Bittoun Kouzmine (France) M Janvier	6	7^{10}
(Tunisia) M Echargui (Spain) O Roca Batalla	6	6
4	(India) RC Bollipalli (India) N Kaliyanda Poonacha	4	4
(France) G Blancaneaux (France) B Bonzi	6	6
(Italy) E Dalla Valle (Italy) S Napolitano	4	2
(Chinese Taipei) R Ho (Australia) C Puttergill	4	5
2	(Poland) P Matuszewski (Australia) MC Romios	6	7

Quarterfinals
(Australia) T Schoolkate (Australia) A Walton	6	2	[7]
(Philippines) FC Alcantara (Japan) K Uchida	1	6	[10]
(Germany) J Schnaitter (Germany) M Wallner	4	4
(India) S Myneni (India) R Ramanathan	6	6
Alt	(France) C Bittoun Kouzmine (France) M Janvier	1	6	[10]
(Tunisia) M Echargui (Spain) O Roca Batalla	6	2	[5]
(France) G Blancaneaux (France) B Bonzi	3	5
2	(Poland) P Matuszewski (Australia) MC Romios	6	7

Semifinals
(Philippines) FC Alcantara (Japan) K Uchida	2	6	[7]
(India) S Myneni (India) R Ramanathan	6	2	[10]
Alt	(France) C Bittoun Kouzmine (France) M Janvier	6	3	[10]
2	(Poland) P Matuszewski (Australia) MC Romios	3	6	[6]

Final
(India) S Myneni (India) R Ramanathan	6	6
Alt	(France) C Bittoun Kouzmine (France) M Janvier	3	4
