= 2026 Bengaluru Open – Doubles =

Doubles
- 2026 Bengaluru Open

Final
- Champions: (Colombia) Nicolás Barrientos (United States) Benjamin Kittay
- Runners-up: (France) Arthur Reymond (France) Luca Sanchez
- Score: 7–6^{(11–9)}, 7–5

Events
Singles	Doubles
- Bengaluru Open

Anirudh Chandrasekar and Ray Ho were the defending champions but only Chandrasekar chose to defend his title, partnering Arjun Kadhe. They lost in the first round to Max Houkes and Niels Visker.

Nicolás Barrientos and Benjamin Kittay won the title after defeating Arthur Reymond and Luca Sanchez 7–6^{(11–9)}, 7–5 in the final.

== Seeds ==
1. (India) Sriram Balaji / (Austria) Neil Oberleitner (semifinals)
2. (India) Anirudh Chandrasekar / (India) Arjun Kadhe (first round)
3. (France) Arthur Reymond / (France) Luca Sanchez (final)
4. (Colombia) Nicolás Barrientos / (United States) Benjamin Kittay (champions)

== Draw ==
Key

- Q = Qualifier
- WC = Wild card
- LL = Lucky loser
- Alt = Alternate
- ITF = ITF entry
- PR = Protected ranking
- SR = Special ranking
- SE = Special exempt
- JE = Junior exempt
- JR = Junior Accelerator Programme entrant
- CO = College Accelerator Programme entrant
- NG = Next Gen Accelerator Program entrant
- w/o = Walkover
- r = Retired
- d = Defaulted

First round
1	(India) S Balaji (Austria) N Oberleitner	6	6
(Ukraine) V Orlov (Finland) E Vasa	3	2
WC	(India) S Banthia (India) D Suresh	4	4
Alt	P Bar Biryukov (Kazakhstan) G Lomakin	6	6
3	(France) A Reymond (France) L Sanchez	4	6	[10]
(Japan) M Imamura (Japan) Ryuki Matsuda	6	3	[8]
WC	(India) A Kalyanpur (India) S Myneni	7^{7}	4	[13]
(South Africa) L Harris (India) S Nagal	6^{3}	6	[11]
(India) SDP Dev (India) Nitin Kumar Sinha	6	7
(Belgium) M Geerts (Japan) S Watanabe	2	5
(France) M Martineau (Kazakhstan) B Zhukayev	5	3
4	(Colombia) N Barrientos (United States) B Kittay	7	6
(Thailand) P Isaro (India) N Kaliyanda Poonacha	6	3	[10]
(India) J Nedunchezhiyan (India) R Ramanathan	4	6	[8]
(Netherlands) M Houkes (Netherlands) N Visker	2	7^{7}	[10]
2	(India) A Chandrasekar (India) A Kadhe	6	6^{4}	[5]

Quarterfinals
1	(India) S Balaji (Austria) N Oberleitner	6^{6}	6	[10]
Alt	P Bar Biryukov (Kazakhstan) G Lomakin	7^{8}	4	[6]
3	(France) A Reymond (France) L Sanchez	5	6	[10]
WC	(India) A Kalyanpur (India) S Myneni	7	4	[8]
(India) SDP Dev (India) NK Sinha	7^{7}	3	[8]
4	(Colombia) N Barrientos (United States) B Kittay	6^{3}	6	[10]
(Thailand) P Isaro (India) N Kaliyanda Poonacha	6^{2}	6^{1}
(Netherlands) M Houkes (Netherlands) N Visker	7^{7}	7^{7}

Semifinals
1	(India) S Balaji (Austria) N Oberleitner	6^{4}	6^{3}
3	(France) A Reymond (France) L Sanchez	7^{7}	7^{7}
4	(Colombia) N Barrientos (United States) B Kittay	7^{8}	6
(Netherlands) M Houkes (Netherlands) N Visker	6^{6}	3

Final
3	(France) A Reymond (France) L Sanchez	6^{9}	5
4	(Colombia) N Barrientos (United States) B Kittay	7^{11}	7
