= 2023 Bengaluru Open – Doubles =

Doubles
- 2023 Bengaluru Open

Final
- Champions: (South Korea) Chung Yun-seong (Chinese Taipei) Hsu Yu-hsiou
- Runners-up: (India) Anirudh Chandrasekar (India) Vijay Sundar Prashanth
- Score: 3–6, 7–6^{(9–7)}, [11–9]

Events
Singles	Doubles
← 2022 ·	Bengaluru Open	· 2024 →

Alexander Erler and Arjun Kadhe were the defending champions but only Kadhe chose to defend his title, partnering Maximilian Neuchrist. Kadhe and Neuchrist lost in the semifinals to Anirudh Chandrasekar and Vijay Sundar Prashanth.

Chung Yun-seong and Hsu Yu-hsiou won the title after defeating Chandrasekar and Prashanth 3–6, 7–6^{(9–7)}, [11–9] in the final.

== Seeds ==
1. (Australia) Marc Polmans / (Australia) Max Purcell (semifinals)
2. (South Korea) Nam Ji-sung / (South Korea) Song Min-kyu (first round)
3. (India) Purav Raja / (India) Divij Sharan (first round)
4. (India) Arjun Kadhe / (Austria) Maximilian Neuchrist (semifinals)

== Draw ==
=== Key ===
- Q = Qualifier
- WC = Wild card
- LL = Lucky loser
- Alt = Alternate
- ITF = ITF entry
- PR = Protected ranking
- SR = Special ranking
- SE = Special exempt
- JE = Junior exempt
- JR = Junior Accelerator Programme entrant
- CO = College Accelerator Programme entrant
- NG = Next Gen Accelerator Program entrant
- w/o = Walkover
- r = Retired
- d = Defaulted

First round
1	(Australia) M Polmans (Australia) M Purcell	7^{7}	4	[10]
Alt	(Australia) C Puttergill (Australia) D Sweeny	6^{3}	6	[6]
Alt	(Northern Mariana Islands) C Sinclair (Serbia) M Zekić	2	6^{4}
(Italy) F Maestrelli (India) R Ramanathan	6	7^{7}
3	(India) P Raja (India) D Sharan	4	4
(South Korea) Y-s Chung (Chinese Taipei) Y-h Hsu	6	6
Alt	(United States) N Moreno de Alboran (Japan) Y Uchiyama	6	6
(Japan) T Matsui (Japan) K Uesugi	1	4
(Portugal) F Ferreira Silva (Bulgaria) D Kuzmanov	2	6	[10]
(Serbia) H Međedović (Italy) L Nardi	6	3	[6]
(Czech Republic) P Nouza (Czech Republic) A Paulson	6^{5}	4
4	(India) A Kadhe (Austria) M Neuchrist	7^{7}	6
WC	(India) SDP Dev (India) Parikshit Somani	5	2
(India) A Chandrasekar (India) VS Prashanth	7	6
(Zimbabwe) B Lock (Australia) A Santillan	6	3	[10]
2	(South Korea) J-s Nam (South Korea) M-k Song	3	6	[5]

Quarterfinals
1	(Australia) M Polmans (Australia) M Purcell	6	6
(Italy) F Maestrelli (India) R Ramanathan	3	4
(South Korea) Y-s Chung (Chinese Taipei) Y-h Hsu	7^{8}	6
Alt	(United States) N Moreno de Alboran (Japan) Y Uchiyama	6^{6}	2
(Portugal) F Ferreira Silva (Bulgaria) D Kuzmanov	5	3
4	(India) A Kadhe (Austria) M Neuchrist	7	6
(India) A Chandrasekar (India) VS Prashanth	3	6	[12]
(Zimbabwe) B Lock (Australia) A Santillan	6	4	[10]

Semifinals
1	(Australia) M Polmans (Australia) M Purcell	4	4
(South Korea) Y-s Chung (Chinese Taipei) Y-h Hsu	6	6
4	(India) A Kadhe (Austria) M Neuchrist	6^{1}	6	[2]
(India) A Chandrasekar (India) VS Prashanth	7^{7}	4	[10]

Final
(South Korea) Y-s Chung (Chinese Taipei) Y-h Hsu	3	7^{9}	[11]
(India) A Chandrasekar (India) VS Prashanth	6	6^{7}	[9]
