= 2024 Bengaluru Open – Singles =

Singles
- 2024 Bengaluru Open

Final
- Champion: (Italy) Stefano Napolitano
- Runner-up: (South Korea) Hong Seong-chan
- Score: 4–6, 6–3, 6–3

Events
Singles	Doubles
← 2023 ·	Bengaluru Open	· 2025 →

Max Purcell was the defending champion but chose not to defend his title.

Stefano Napolitano won the title after defeating Hong Seong-chan 4–6, 6–3, 6–3 in the final.

== Seeds ==
1. (Italy) Luca Nardi (second round)
2. (India) Sumit Nagal (semifinals)
3. (Croatia) Duje Ajduković (first round)
4. (France) Benjamin Bonzi (second round)
5. (Australia) Adam Walton (quarterfinals)
6. (France) Ugo Blanchet (withdrew)
7. (Italy) Stefano Napolitano (champion)
8. (Spain) Oriol Roca Batalla (semifinals)
9. (South Korea) Hong Seong-chan (final)

== Draw ==
=== Key ===
- Q = Qualifier
- WC = Wild card
- LL = Lucky loser
- Alt = Alternate
- SE = Special exempt
- PR = Protected ranking
- ITF = ITF entry
- JE = Junior exempt
- w/o = Walkover
- r = Retired
- d = Defaulted
- SR = Special ranking

=== Finals ===
Semifinals
9	(South Korea) Hong Seong-chan	6	3	6
8	(Spain) Oriol Roca Batalla	2	6	3
7	(Italy) Stefano Napolitano	7^{7}	6
2	(India) Sumit Nagal	6^{2}	4

Final
9	(South Korea) Hong Seong-chan	6	3	3
7	(Italy) Stefano Napolitano	4	6	6

=== Top half ===
First round
1	(Italy) L Nardi	3	6	7^{7}
LL	(France) D Added	6	3	6^{0}
WC	(India) R Ramanathan	6^{4}	7	6
(France) M Janvier	7^{7}	5	4
Q	A Zakharov	6	7
Q	(Italy) Samuel Vincent Ruggeri	2	5
(Australia) T Schoolkate	4	3
9	(South Korea) S-c Hong	6	6
4	(France) B Bonzi	6	6
(Australia) P Sekulic	3	2
(Poland) M Kaśnikowski	7	6
(Chinese Taipei) T-l Wu	5	2
Q	(Australia) B Tomic	6	3	3
(United States) T Boyer	3	6	6
Q	(Chinese Taipei) C-h Tseng	5	3
8	(Spain) O Roca Batalla	7	6

Second round
1	(Italy) L Nardi	6	4	4
WC	(India) R Ramanathan	1	6	6
Q	A Zakharov	4	5
9	(South Korea) S-c Hong	6	7
4	(France) B Bonzi	3	4
(Poland) M Kaśnikowski	6	6
(United States) T Boyer	5	3
8	(Spain) O Roca Batalla	7	6

Quarterfinals
WC	(India) R Ramanathan	5	7	4
9	(South Korea) S-c Hong	7	5	6
(Poland) M Kaśnikowski	6^{5}	6	5
8	(Spain) O Roca Batalla	7^{7}	4	7

Semifinals
9	(South Korea) S-c Hong	6	3	6
8	(Spain) O Roca Batalla	2	6	3

=== Bottom half ===
First round
7	(Italy) S Napolitano	6	6
(Australia) D Sweeny	3	3
Q	(Ukraine) Eric Vanshelboim	6^{2}	6	4
WC	(Canada) V Pospisil	7^{7}	3	6
Alt	(Italy) E Dalla Valle	6	7
E Donskoy	2	5
Alt	(Tunisia) M Echargui	6	6
3	(Croatia) D Ajduković	2	4
5	(Australia) A Walton	6	6
WC	(India) SDP Dev	3	0
(Italy) G Fonio	4	6	6^{5}
(Belgium) G Onclin	6	1	7^{7}
Q	(Belgium) R Collignon	4	6^{4}
(Hong Kong) C Wong	6	7^{7}
(France) G Blancaneaux	2	2
2	(India) S Nagal	6	6

Second round
7	(Italy) S Napolitano	6	4	6
WC	(Canada) V Pospisil	4	6	4
Alt	(Italy) E Dalla Valle	2	2
Alt	(Tunisia) M Echargui	6	6
5	(Australia) A Walton	6	6
(Belgium) G Onclin	2	2
(Hong Kong) C Wong	2	5
2	(India) S Nagal	6	7

Quarterfinals
7	(Italy) S Napolitano	6^{5}	6	6
Alt	(Tunisia) M Echargui	7^{7}	4	4
5	(Australia) A Walton	5	2
2	(India) S Nagal	7	6

Semifinals
7	(Italy) S Napolitano	7^{7}	6
2	(India) S Nagal	6^{2}	4
