= 2025 Bengaluru Open =

- Date: 24 February – 2 March
- Edition: 9th
- Surface: Hard
- Location: Bangalore, India

Champions

Singles
- (United States) Brandon Holt

Doubles
- (India) Anirudh Chandrasekar / (Chinese Taipei) Ray Ho
- Bengaluru Open

The 2025 Dafa News Bengaluru Open was a professional tennis tournament played on hard courts. It was the ninth edition of the tournament which was part of the 2025 ATP Challenger Tour. It took place in Bangalore, India, from 24 February to 2 March 2025.

== Singles main-draw entrants ==
=== Seeds ===
Country	Player	Rank^{1}	Seed
CZE	Vít Kopřiva	120	1
AUS	Tristan Schoolkate	134	2
USA	Brandon Holt	153	3
DEN	Elmer Møller	154	4
FRA	Kyrian Jacquet	156	5
FRA	Ugo Blanchet	164	6
JPN	Shintaro Mochizuki	168	7
~~CAN~~	~~Alexis Galarneau~~	~~170~~	~~8~~

- ^{1} Rankings are as of 17 February 2025.

=== Other entrants ===
The following players received wildcards into the singles main draw:

- (India) S D Prajwal Dev
- (India) Manas Dhamne
- (India) Ramkumar Ramanathan

The following players received entry from the qualifying draw:

- (Spain) Nicolás Álvarez Varona
- Petr Bar Biryukov
- (Czech Republic) Hynek Bartoň
- (Thailand) Kasidit Samrej
- Ilia Simakin
- (India) Karan Singh

The following player received entry as a lucky loser:

- (United Kingdom) Billy Harris

== Champions ==
=== Singles ===
- (United States) Brandon Holt def. (Japan) Shintaro Mochizuki 6–3, 6–3.

=== Doubles ===
- (India) Anirudh Chandrasekar / (Chinese Taipei) Ray Ho def. (Australia) Blake Bayldon / (Australia) Matthew Romios 6–2, 6–4.
