= 2023 Bengaluru Open – Singles =

Singles
- 2023 Bengaluru Open

Final
- Champion: (Australia) Max Purcell
- Runner-up: (Australia) James Duckworth
- Score: 3–6, 7–5, 7–6^{(7–5)}

Events
| Singles | Doubles |
| ← 2022 · | Bengaluru Open | · 2024 → |

Aleksandar Vukic was the defending champion but chose not to defend his title.

Max Purcell won the title after defeating James Duckworth 3–6, 7–5, 7–6^{(7–5)} in the final.

== Seeds ==
1. (Chinese Taipei) Tseng Chun-hsin (quarterfinals)
2. (Australia) James Duckworth (final)
3. (United Kingdom) Ryan Peniston (second round)
4. (Austria) Sebastian Ofner (first round)
5. (Italy) Luca Nardi (quarterfinals)
6. (Italy) Francesco Maestrelli (first round)
7. (Czech Republic) Dalibor Svrčina (first round)
8. (Bulgaria) Dimitar Kuzmanov (quarterfinals)

== Draw ==
=== Key ===
- Q = Qualifier
- WC = Wild card
- LL = Lucky loser
- Alt = Alternate
- SE = Special exempt
- PR = Protected ranking
- ITF = ITF entry
- JE = Junior exempt
- w/o = Walkover
- r = Retired
- d = Defaulted
- SR = Special ranking

=== Finals ===
Semifinals
(Serbia) Hamad Međedović | 2 | 7 | 6^{4}
(Australia) Max Purcell | 6 | 5 | 7^{7}
Q | (Australia) James McCabe | 3 | 3
2 | (Australia) James Duckworth | 6 | 6

Final
(Australia) Max Purcell | 3 | 7 | 7^{7}
2 | (Australia) James Duckworth | 6 | 5 | 6^{5}

=== Top half ===
First round
1 | (Chinese Taipei) C-h Tseng | 6 | 6
(Portugal) F Ferreira Silva | 4 | 4
(Chinese Taipei) Y-h Hsu | 6 | 6
WC | (Sweden) L Borg | 2 | 3
Q | (India) P Gunneswaran | 3 | 4
(Serbia) H Međedović | 6 | 6
(United States) N Moreno de Alboran | 7 | 6
7 | (Czech Republic) D Svrčina | 5 | 2
4 | (Austria) S Ofner | 6^{6} | 6 | 3
(Australia) M Purcell | 7^{8} | 3 | 6
(Vietnam) NH Lý | 6^{3} | 7 | 4
WC | (India) S Nagal | 7^{7} | 5 | 6
WC | (India) SDP Dev | 2 | 2
Q | (Chinese Taipei) J Jung | 6 | 6
(Serbia) M Zekić | 4 | 4
5 | (Italy) L Nardi | 6 | 6

Second round
1 | (Chinese Taipei) C-h Tseng | 6 | 5 | 7^{7}
(Chinese Taipei) Y-h Hsu | 2 | 7 | 6^{4}
(Serbia) H Međedović | 6 | 5 | 6
(United States) N Moreno de Alboran | 3 | 7 | 4
(Australia) M Purcell | 4 | 6 | 6
WC | (India) S Nagal | 6 | 3 | 3
Q | (Chinese Taipei) J Jung | 5 | 7 | 2
5 | (Italy) L Nardi | 7 | 5 | 6

Quarterfinals
1 | (Chinese Taipei) C-h Tseng | 1 | 2
(Serbia) H Međedović | 6 | 6
(Australia) M Purcell | 6 | 6
5 | (Italy) L Nardi | 2 | 0

Semifinals
(Serbia) H Međedović | 2 | 7 | 6^{4}
(Australia) M Purcell | 6 | 5 | 7^{7}

=== Bottom half ===
First round
6 | (Italy) F Maestrelli | 1 | 2
PR | (Australia) M Polmans | 6 | 6
(Italy) L Giustino | 2 | 6^{3}
Q | (Australia) J McCabe | 6 | 7^{7}
Alt | (France) H Mayot | 3 | 6 | 6
(Australia) D Sweeny | 6 | 1 | 4
(Croatia) N Serdarušić | 4 | 2
3 | (United Kingdom) R Peniston | 6 | 6
8 | (Bulgaria) D Kuzmanov | 6 | 6
Q | (Serbia) N Milojević | 4 | 1
(Austria) M Neuchrist | 6 | 5 | 2
Q | A Kachmazov | 3 | 7 | 6
Q | (France) G Mpetshi Perricard | 6^{4} | 6 | 6
LL | (Japan) Y Uchiyama | 7^{7} | 4 | 4
(Japan) R Noguchi | 6^{3} | 1
2 | (Australia) J Duckworth | 7^{7} | 6

Second round
PR | (Australia) M Polmans | 5 | 5
Q | (Australia) J McCabe | 7 | 7
Alt | (France) H Mayot | 7^{7} | 6
3 | (United Kingdom) R Peniston | 6^{5} | 0
8 | (Bulgaria) D Kuzmanov | 6 | 6
Q | A Kachmazov | 3 | 4
Q | (France) G Mpetshi Perricard | 1 | 2
2 | (Australia) J Duckworth | 6 | 6

Quarterfinals
Q | (Australia) J McCabe | 6 | 7^{7}
Alt | (France) H Mayot | 3 | 6^{4}
8 | (Bulgaria) D Kuzmanov | 4 | 1
2 | (Australia) J Duckworth | 6 | 6

Semifinals
Q | (Australia) J McCabe | 3 | 3
2 | (Australia) J Duckworth | 6 | 6
