= 2026 Bengaluru Open – Singles =

Singles
- 2026 Bengaluru Open

Final
- Champion: (Spain) Pedro Martínez
- Runner-up: (Kazakhstan) Timofey Skatov
- Score: 7–6^{(7–5)}, 6–3

Events
Singles	Doubles
- Bengaluru Open

Brandon Holt was the defending champion but chose not to defend his title.

Pedro Martínez won the title after defeating Timofey Skatov 7–6^{(7–5)}, 6–3 in the final.

== Seeds ==
1. (Spain) Pedro Martínez (champion)
2. (France) Harold Mayot (semifinals)
3. (United Kingdom) Jay Clarke (first round)
4. (South Africa) Lloyd Harris (first round)
5. (Croatia) Matej Dodig (first round)
6. (Kazakhstan) Timofey Skatov (final)
7. (Netherlands) Max Houkes (first round)
8. (Lebanon) Benjamin Hassan (first round)

== Draw ==
Key

- Q = Qualifier
- WC = Wild card
- LL = Lucky loser
- Alt = Alternate
- ITF = ITF entry
- PR = Protected ranking
- SR = Special ranking
- SE = Special exempt
- JE = Junior exempt
- JR = Junior Accelerator Programme entrant
- CO = College Accelerator Programme entrant
- NG = Next Gen Accelerator Program entrant
- w/o = Walkover
- r = Retired
- d = Defaulted

=== Finals ===
Semifinals
1	(Spain) Pedro Martínez	7^{7}	6
(France) Matteo Martineau	6^{4}	1
6	(Kazakhstan) Timofey Skatov	6	6
2	(France) Harold Mayot	4	3

Final
1	(Spain) Pedro Martínez	7^{7}	6
6	(Kazakhstan) Timofey Skatov	6^{5}	3

=== Top half ===
First round
1	(Spain) P Martínez	4	6	6
Q	(Finland) E Vasa	6	2	3
Q	(France) Alexis Gautier	6	4	3
(Belgium) M Geerts	3	6	6
(Croatia) B Gojo	6	6
(India) K Singh	2	4
(Germany) C-M Stebe	4	6	6
7	(Netherlands) M Houkes	6	3	1
3	(United Kingdom) J Clarke	6	1	2
(France) M Martineau	4	6	6
Q	(Netherlands) N Visker	6	2	4
(Ukraine) Eric Vanshelboim	3	6	6
(India) Aryan Shah	1	2
(Kazakhstan) B Zhukayev	6	6
WC	(India) M Dhamne	7	4	6
5	(Croatia) M Dodig	5	6	1

Second round
1	(Spain) P Martínez	7^{7}	6
(Belgium) M Geerts	6^{3}	3
(Croatia) B Gojo	5	6^{9}
(Germany) C-M Stebe	7	7^{11}
(France) M Martineau	6	6
(Ukraine) E Vanshelboim	2	2
(Kazakhstan) B Zhukayev	2	6	2
WC	(India) M Dhamne	6	3	6

Quarterfinals
1	(Spain) P Martínez	6	6
(Germany) C-M Stebe	2	0
(France) M Martineau	6	7^{7}
WC	(India) M Dhamne	4	6^{5}

Semifinals
1	(Spain) P Martínez	7^{7}	6
(France) M Martineau	6^{4}	1

=== Bottom half ===
First round
6	(Kazakhstan) T Skatov	6	6
(Austria) N Oberleitner	3	3
Q	(Malaysia) Mitsuki Wei Kang Leong	6	6
Q	(Tunisia) A Ouakaa	2	2
(Ukraine) V Orlov	7^{7}	5	4
(Canada) D Martin	6^{4}	7	6
(Czech Republic) J Forejtek	7^{7}	6
4	(South Africa) L Harris	6^{5}	4
8	(Lebanon) B Hassan	4	1
Q	(France) F Balshaw	6	6
(Croatia) D Ajduković	4	4
WC	(India) D Suresh	6	6
(India) S Nagal	6	6
WC	(India) SDP Dev	3	3
P Bar Biryukov	1	4
2	(France) H Mayot	6	6

Second round
6	(Kazakhstan) T Skatov	6	7
Q	(Malaysia) MWK Leong	3	5
(Canada) D Martin	7^{7}	1	4
(Czech Republic) J Forejtek	6^{5}	6	6
Q	(France) F Balshaw	3	6	6^{4}
WC	(India) D Suresh	6	1	7^{7}
(India) S Nagal	6^{2}	6	6^{11}
2	(France) H Mayot	7^{7}	1	7^{13}

Quarterfinals
6	(Kazakhstan) T Skatov	6	6
(Czech Republic) J Forejtek	4	2
WC	(India) D Suresh	6^{5}	2
2	(France) H Mayot	7^{7}	6

Semifinals
6	(Kazakhstan) T Skatov	6	6
2	(France) H Mayot	4	3
