= 2023 Bengaluru Open =

- Date: 20–26 February
- Edition: 7th
- Surface: Hard
- Location: Bangalore, India

Champions

Singles
- (Australia) Max Purcell

Doubles
- (South Korea) Chung Yun-seong / (Chinese Taipei) Hsu Yu-hsiou
- Bengaluru Open

The 2023 Bengaluru Open was a professional tennis tournament played on hard courts. It was the seventh edition of the tournament which was part of the 2023 ATP Challenger Tour. It took place in Bangalore, India from 20 to 26 February 2023.

== Singles main-draw entrants ==
=== Seeds ===
Country	Player	Rank^{1}	Seed
TPE	Tseng Chun-hsin	132	1
AUS	James Duckworth	138	2
GBR	Ryan Peniston	147	3
AUT	Sebastian Ofner	155	4
ITA	Luca Nardi	158	5
ITA	Francesco Maestrelli	179	6
CZE	Dalibor Svrčina	187	7
BUL	Dimitar Kuzmanov	196	8

- ^{1} Rankings are as of 13 February 2023.

=== Other entrants ===
The following players received wildcards into the singles main draw:

- (Sweden) Leo Borg
- (India) S D Prajwal Dev
- (India) Sumit Nagal

The following player received entry into the singles main draw using a protected ranking:

- (Australia) Marc Polmans

The following player received entry into the singles main draw as an alternate:

- (France) Harold Mayot

The following players received entry from the qualifying draw:

- (India) Prajnesh Gunneswaran
- (Chinese Taipei) Jason Jung
- Alibek Kachmazov
- (Australia) James McCabe
- (Serbia) Nikola Milojević
- (France) Giovanni Mpetshi Perricard

The following player received entry as a lucky loser:

- (Japan) Yasutaka Uchiyama

== Champions ==
=== Singles ===
- (Australia) Max Purcell def. (Australia) James Duckworth 3–6, 7–5, 7–6^{(7–5)}.

=== Doubles ===
- (South Korea) Chung Yun-seong / (Chinese Taipei) Hsu Yu-hsiou def. (India) Anirudh Chandrasekar / (India) Vijay Sundar Prashanth 3–6, 7–6^{(9–7)}, [11–9].
