= 2022 Bengaluru Open II – Doubles =

Doubles
- 2022 Bengaluru Open II

Final
- Champions: (Austria) Alexander Erler (India) Arjun Kadhe
- Runners-up: (India) Saketh Myneni (India) Ramkumar Ramanathan
- Score: 6–3, 6–7^{(4–7)}, [10–7]

Events
| Singles | Doubles |
- Bengaluru Open

Saketh Myneni and Ramkumar Ramanathan were the defending champions but lost in the final to Alexander Erler and Arjun Kadhe.

Erler and Kadhe won the title after defeating Myneni and Ramanathan 6–3, 6–7^{(4–7)}, [10–7] in the final.

== Seeds ==
1. (Austria) Alexander Erler / (India) Arjun Kadhe (champions)
2. (India) Jeevan Nedunchezhiyan / (India) Purav Raja (quarterfinals)
3. (India) Saketh Myneni / (India) Ramkumar Ramanathan (final)
4. (India) Sriram Balaji / (India) Vishnu Vardhan (semifinals)

== Draw ==
Key

- Q = Qualifier
- WC = Wild card
- LL = Lucky loser
- Alt = Alternate
- ITF = ITF entry
- PR = Protected ranking
- SR = Special ranking
- SE = Special exempt
- JE = Junior exempt
- JR = Junior Accelerator Programme entrant
- CO = College Accelerator Programme entrant
- NG = Next Gen Accelerator Program entrant
- w/o = Walkover
- r = Retired
- d = Defaulted

First round
1 | (Austria) A Erler (India) A Kadhe | 6 | 6
Alt | (Russia) B Bobrov (Czech Republic) D Palán | 0 | 3
(Canada) S Diez (Japan) R Noguchi | 2 | 4
WC | (India) SDP Dev (India) N Kaliyanda Poonacha | 6 | 6
4 | (India) S Balaji (India) V Vardhan | 6 | 6
WC | (India) Suraj Prabodh (India) Rishi Reddy | 4 | 2
PR | (India) A Chandrasekar (India) VS Prashanth | 5 | 6^{3}
(Greece) M Kalovelonis (Japan) T Matsui | 7 | 7^{7}
(Czech Republic) V Kopřiva (Czech Republic) J Pospíšil | 5 | 4
(Ukraine) V Orlov (Germany) K Wehnelt | 7 | 6
(India) Y Bhambri (India) D Sharan | 1 | 5
3 | (India) S Myneni (India) R Ramanathan | 6 | 7
(France) E Couacaud (Australia) A Harris | 6 | 6
(Italy) R Brancaccio (Switzerland) J Nikles | 4 | 2
(Australia) T Fancutt (Australia) J Kubler | 3 | 5
2 | (India) J Nedunchezhiyan (India) P Raja | 6 | 7

Quarterfinals
1 | (Austria) A Erler (India) A Kadhe | 6 | 3 | [10]
WC | (India) SDP Dev (India) N Kaliyanda Poonacha | 1 | 6 | [6]
4 | (India) S Balaji (India) V Vardhan | 6 | 4 | [11]
(Greece) M Kalovelonis (Japan) T Matsui | 3 | 6 | [9]
(Ukraine) V Orlov (Germany) K Wehnelt | 4 | 6^{3}
3 | (India) S Myneni (India) R Ramanathan | 6 | 7^{7}
(France) E Couacaud (Australia) A Harris | 3 | 6 | [13]
2 | (India) J Nedunchezhiyan (India) P Raja | 6 | 2 | [11]

Semifinals
1 | (Austria) A Erler (India) A Kadhe | 6 | 4 | [10]
4 | (India) S Balaji (India) V Vardhan | 4 | 6 | [3]
3 | (India) S Myneni (India) R Ramanathan | 6 | 7^{7}
(France) E Couacaud (Australia) A Harris | 1 | 6^{3}

Final
1 | (Austria) A Erler (India) A Kadhe | 6 | 6^{4} | [10]
3 | (India) S Myneni (India) R Ramanathan | 3 | 7^{7} | [7]
