= 2025 Bengaluru Open – Singles =

Singles
- 2025 Bengaluru Open

Final
- Champion: (United States) Brandon Holt
- Runner-up: (Japan) Shintaro Mochizuki
- Score: 6–3, 6–3

Events
Singles	Doubles
- Bengaluru Open

Stefano Napolitano was the defending champion but chose not to defend his title.

Brandon Holt won the title after defeating Shintaro Mochizuki 6–3, 6–3 in the final.

== Seeds ==
1. (Czech Republic) Vít Kopřiva (first round)
2. (Australia) Tristan Schoolkate (quarterfinals)
3. (United States) Brandon Holt (champion)
4. (Denmark) Elmer Møller (first round)
5. (France) Kyrian Jacquet (first round)
6. (France) Ugo Blanchet (first round, retired)
7. (Japan) Shintaro Mochizuki (final)
8. (Canada) Alexis Galarneau (withdrew)

== Draw ==
Key

- Q = Qualifier
- WC = Wild card
- LL = Lucky loser
- Alt = Alternate
- ITF = ITF entry
- PR = Protected ranking
- SR = Special ranking
- SE = Special exempt
- JE = Junior exempt
- JR = Junior Accelerator Programme entrant
- CO = College Accelerator Programme entrant
- NG = Next Gen Accelerator Program entrant
- w/o = Walkover
- r = Retired
- d = Defaulted

=== Finals ===
Semifinals
7	(Japan) Shintaro Mochizuki	6	3	6
(Australia) James McCabe	1	6	4
3	(United States) Brandon Holt	6	7^{7}
LL	(United Kingdom) Billy Harris	2	6^{4}

Final
7	(Japan) Shintaro Mochizuki	3	3
3	(United States) Brandon Holt	6	6

=== Top half ===
First round
1	(Czech Republic) V Kopřiva	6	4	3
Q	(Czech Republic) H Bartoň	4	6	6
(Italy) E Dalla Valle	4	4
(Denmark) A Holmgren	6	6
Q	(Thailand) K Samrej	1	0
(United Kingdom) J Clarke	6	6
WC	(India) R Ramanathan	6^{3}	5
7	(Japan) S Mochizuki	7^{7}	7
4	(Denmark) E Møller	3	4
(Colombia) N Mejía	6	6
(Belgium) M Geerts	7^{7}	4	6^{6}
(Australia) B Ellis	6^{2}	6	7^{8}
(Germany) J Engel	5	2
(Japan) R Noguchi	7	6
(Australia) J McCabe	6^{8}	6	6
5	(France) K Jacquet	7^{10}	1	2

Second round
Q	(Czech Republic) H Bartoň	7^{7}	6
(Denmark) A Holmgren	6^{5}	3
(United Kingdom) J Clarke	7	1	2
7	(Japan) S Mochizuki	5	6	6
(Colombia) N Mejía	6	7
(Australia) B Ellis	1	5
(Japan) R Noguchi	5	7	6^{5}
(Australia) J McCabe	7	5	7^{7}

Quarterfinals
Q	(Czech Republic) H Bartoň	6^{5}	3
7	(Japan) S Mochizuki	7^{7}	6
(Colombia) N Mejía	6	4	3
(Australia) J McCabe	4	6	6

Semifinals
7	(Japan) S Mochizuki	6	3	6
(Australia) J McCabe	1	6	4

=== Bottom half ===
First round
6	(France) U Blanchet	3	2^{r}
Q	(Spain) N Álvarez Varona	6	4
WC	(India) M Dhamne	3	6	6^{3}
Q	P Bar Biryukov	6	3	7^{7}
Q	I Simakin	6	6^{4}	4
(Australia) B Tomic	3	7^{7}	6
(Monaco) V Vacherot	4	4
3	(United States) B Holt	6	6
LL	(United Kingdom) B Harris	6	1
(France) E Couacaud	1	0^{r}
(Czech Republic) M Gengel	6^{2}	6	6
WC	(India) SDP Dev	7^{7}	3	3
Q	(India) K Singh	4	6	6^{3}
(Austria) J Rodionov	6	4	7^{7}
(Uzbekistan) K Sultanov	5	7^{7}	3
2	(Australia) T Schoolkate	7	6^{5}	6

Second round
Q	(Spain) N Álvarez Varona	4	6^{5}
Q	P Bar Biryukov	6	7^{7}
(Australia) B Tomic	7	4	4
3	(United States) B Holt	5	6	6
LL	(United Kingdom) B Harris	6	6
(Czech Republic) M Gengel	4	3
(Austria) J Rodionov	3	6	2
2	(Australia) T Schoolkate	6	3	6

Quarterfinals
Q	P Bar Biryukov	4	4
3	(United States) B Holt	6	6
LL	(United Kingdom) B Harris	6	1	7
2	(Australia) T Schoolkate	2	6	5

Semifinals
3	(United States) B Holt	6	7^{7}
LL	(United Kingdom) B Harris	2	6^{4}
