= 2026 Bengaluru Open =

- Date: 5 – 10 January
- Edition: 10th
- Surface: Hard
- Location: Bangalore, India

Champions

Singles
- (Spain) Pedro Martínez

Doubles
- (Colombia) Nicolás Barrientos / (United States) Benjamin Kittay
- Bengaluru Open

The 2026 Dafa News Bengaluru Open was a professional tennis tournament played on hard courts. It was the tenth edition of the tournament which was part of the 2026 ATP Challenger Tour. It took place in Bangalore, India, from 5 to 10 January 2026.

== Singles main-draw entrants ==
=== Seeds ===
Country	Player	Rank^{1}	Seed
ESP	Pedro Martínez	92	1
FRA	Harold Mayot	163	2
GBR	Jay Clarke	175	3
RSA	Lloyd Harris	222	4
CRO	Matej Dodig	232	5
KAZ	Timofey Skatov	237	6
NED	Max Houkes	247	7
LBN	Benjamin Hassan	254	8

- ^{1} Rankings are as of 29 December 2025.

=== Other entrants ===
The following players received wildcards into the singles main draw:

- (India) S D Prajwal Dev
- (India) Manas Dhamne
- (India) Dhakshineswar Suresh

The following players received entry from the qualifying draw:

- (France) Felix Balshaw
- (France) Alexis Gautier
- (Malaysia) Mitsuki Wei Kang Leong
- (Tunisia) Aziz Ouakaa
- (Finland) Eero Vasa
- (Netherlands) Niels Visker

== Champions ==
=== Singles ===
- (Spain) Pedro Martínez def. (Kazakhstan) Timofey Skatov 7–6^{(7–5)}, 6–3.

=== Doubles ===
- (Colombia) Nicolás Barrientos / (United States) Benjamin Kittay def. (France) Arthur Reymond / (France) Luca Sanchez 7–6^{(11–9)}, 7–5.
