= 2017 Bengaluru Open – Doubles =

Doubles
- 2017 Bengaluru Open

Final
- Champions: (Russia) Mikhail Elgin (India) Divij Sharan
- Runners-up: (Croatia) Ivan Sabanov (Croatia) Matej Sabanov
- Score: 6–3, 6–0

Events
Singles	Doubles
- Bengaluru Open

Saketh Myneni and Sanam Singh were the defending champions but chose not to defend their title.

Mikhail Elgin and Divij Sharan won the title after defeating twin brothers Ivan and Matej Sabanov 6–3, 6–0 in the final.

== Seeds ==
1. (Russia) Mikhail Elgin / (India) Divij Sharan (champions)
2. (United Kingdom) Brydan Klein / (Australia) Marc Polmans (quarterfinals)
3. (India) Sriram Balaji / (India) Vishnu Vardhan (semifinals)
4. (United Kingdom) Scott Clayton / (United Kingdom) Jonny O'Mara (first round)

== Draw ==
Key

- Q = Qualifier
- WC = Wild card
- LL = Lucky loser
- Alt = Alternate
- ITF = ITF entry
- PR = Protected ranking
- SR = Special ranking
- SE = Special exempt
- JE = Junior exempt
- JR = Junior Accelerator Programme entrant
- CO = College Accelerator Programme entrant
- NG = Next Gen Accelerator Program entrant
- w/o = Walkover
- r = Retired
- d = Defaulted

First round
1	(Russia) M Elgin (India) D Sharan	5	6	[10]
(France) G Blancaneaux (United Kingdom) J Clarke	7	4	[5]
(India) S Nagal (Sweden) E Ymer	6	1	[10]
(India) J Nedunchezhiyan (India) VS Prashanth	4	6	[7]
3	(India) S Balaji (India) V Vardhan	6	6
Alt	(Spain) M Vilella Martínez (Spain) B Zapata Miralles	0	3
(India) P Gunneswaran (India) R Ramanathan	6	6
WC	(India) Suraj Prabodh (India) Nitin Kumar Sinha	2	2
(Bosnia and Herzegovina) T Brkić (Croatia) A Pavić	6	6
(Spain) P Martínez (Spain) A Menéndez Maceiras	3	2
(Kazakhstan) T Khabibulin (Kazakhstan) A Nedovyesov	6	4	[10]
4	(United Kingdom) S Clayton (United Kingdom) J O'Mara	4	6	[7]
(Croatia) I Sabanov (Croatia) M Sabanov	6^{3}	6	[10]
WC	(India) Kunal Anand (India) Anvit Bendre	7^{7}	4	[7]
WC	(India) C Sood (India) L Sood	2	5
2	(United Kingdom) B Klein (Australia) M Polmans	6	7

Quarterfinals
1	(Russia) M Elgin (India) D Sharan	6	6
(India) S Nagal (Sweden) E Ymer	3	3
3	(India) S Balaji (India) V Vardhan	6	6
(India) P Gunneswaran (India) R Ramanathan	3	3
(Bosnia and Herzegovina) T Brkić (Croatia) A Pavić	6	4	[10]
(Kazakhstan) T Khabibulin (Kazakhstan) A Nedovyesov	1	6	[7]
(Croatia) I Sabanov (Croatia) M Sabanov	6	2	[10]
2	(United Kingdom) B Klein (Australia) M Polmans	1	6	[8]

Semifinals
1	(Russia) M Elgin (India) D Sharan	6	4	[10]
3	(India) S Balaji (India) V Vardhan	4	6	[8]
(Bosnia and Herzegovina) T Brkić (Croatia) A Pavić	6^{3}	4
(Croatia) I Sabanov (Croatia) M Sabanov	7^{7}	6

Final
1	(Russia) M Elgin (India) D Sharan	6	6
(Croatia) I Sabanov (Croatia) M Sabanov	3	0
