= 2022 Bengaluru Open II – Singles =

Singles
- 2022 Bengaluru Open II

Final
- Champion: (Australia) Aleksandar Vukic
- Runner-up: (Bulgaria) Dimitar Kuzmanov
- Score: 6–4, 6–4

Events
Singles	Doubles
- Bengaluru Open

Tseng Chun-hsin was the defending champion but lost in the first round to Markos Kalovelonis.

Aleksandar Vukic won the title after defeating Dimitar Kuzmanov 6–4, 6–4 in the final.

== Seeds ==
1. (Australia) Aleksandar Vukic (champion)
2. (France) Hugo Grenier (first round)
3. (France) Enzo Couacaud (semifinals)
4. (Italy) Federico Gaio (first round)
5. (Czech Republic) Vít Kopřiva (first round)
6. (Australia) Max Purcell (quarterfinals)
7. (India) Ramkumar Ramanathan (first round)
8. (Chinese Taipei) Tseng Chun-hsin (first round)

== Draw ==
Key

- Q = Qualifier
- WC = Wild card
- LL = Lucky loser
- Alt = Alternate
- ITF = ITF entry
- PR = Protected ranking
- SR = Special ranking
- SE = Special exempt
- JE = Junior exempt
- JR = Junior Accelerator Programme entrant
- CO = College Accelerator Programme entrant
- NG = Next Gen Accelerator Program entrant
- w/o = Walkover
- r = Retired
- d = Defaulted

=== Finals ===
Semifinals
1	(Australia) Aleksandar Vukic	7^{7}	6
(Croatia) Borna Gojo	6^{5}	3
3	(France) Enzo Couacaud	6	5	3
(Bulgaria) Dimitar Kuzmanov	4	7	6

Final
1	(Australia) Aleksandar Vukic	6	6
(Bulgaria) Dimitar Kuzmanov	4	4

=== Top half ===
First round
1	(Australia) A Vukic	6	6
(India) P Gunneswaran	4	2
(United Kingdom) J Clarke	7^{9}	7^{11}
Q	(Australia) A Harris	6^{7}	6^{9}
(Russia) E Donskoy	3	6^{7}
(Australia) M Polmans	6	7^{9}
(Australia) J Kubler	7	3	0
6	(Australia) M Purcell	5	6	6
4	(Italy) F Gaio	4	3
Q	(Switzerland) A Bellier	6	6
WC	(India) Sidharth Rawat	6	6
Q	(India) M Sasikumar	4	4
Q	(Czech Republic) D Palán	6	3	4
(Croatia) B Gojo	4	6	6
(Russia) A Kuznetsov	6	1	6
5	(Czech Republic) V Kopřiva	2	6	3

Second round
1	(Australia) A Vukic	6	6
(United Kingdom) J Clarke	1	3
(Australia) M Polmans	6^{7}	6	2
6	(Australia) M Purcell	7^{9}	4	6
Q	(Switzerland) A Bellier	6	2	6
WC	(India) S Rawat	4	6	4
(Croatia) B Gojo	6	6
(Russia) A Kuznetsov	4	1

Quarterfinals
1	(Australia) A Vukic	6	2	6
6	(Australia) M Purcell	4	6	4
Q	(Switzerland) A Bellier	4	6^{3}
(Croatia) B Gojo	6	7^{7}

Semifinals
1	(Australia) A Vukic	7^{7}	6
(Croatia) B Gojo	6^{5}	3

=== Bottom half ===
First round
8	(Chinese Taipei) C-h Tseng	2	2
Q	(Greece) M Kalovelonis	6	6
(Switzerland) J Nikles	6^{1}	6	7
(Italy) R Brancaccio	7^{7}	1	5
WC	(India) A Kadhe	6	6
WC	(India) A Kalyanpur	2	2
Q	(India) Nitin Kumar Sinha	1	1
3	(France) E Couacaud	6	6
7	(India) R Ramanathan	6	3	2
(France) M Bourgue	4	6	6
(Belgium) K Coppejans	2	1
(Canada) S Diez	6	6
(Morocco) E Benchetrit	5	4
(France) A Müller	7	6
(Bulgaria) D Kuzmanov	6	6
2	(France) H Grenier	4	3

Second round
Q	(Greece) M Kalovelonis	2	3
(Switzerland) J Nikles	6	6
WC	(India) A Kadhe	6^{7}	5
3	(France) E Couacaud	7^{9}	7
(France) M Bourgue	6	6
(Canada) S Diez	3	4
(France) A Müller	4	1
(Bulgaria) D Kuzmanov	6	6

Quarterfinals
(Switzerland) J Nikles	1	2
3	(France) E Couacaud	6	6
(France) M Bourgue	4	2
(Bulgaria) D Kuzmanov	6	6

Semifinals
3	(France) E Couacaud	6	5	3
(Bulgaria) D Kuzmanov	4	7	6
