= 2022 Bengaluru Open II =

- Date: 14–20 February
- Edition: 6th
- Draw: 32S / 16D
- Surface: Hard
- Location: Bangalore, India

Champions

Singles
- (Australia) Aleksandar Vukic

Doubles
- (Austria) Alexander Erler / (India) Arjun Kadhe
- Bengaluru Open

The 2022 Bengaluru Open II was a professional tennis tournament played on hard courts. It was the sixth edition of the tournament which was part of the 2022 ATP Challenger Tour. It took place in Bangalore, India from 14 to 20 February 2022.

== Singles main-draw entrants ==
=== Seeds ===
Country	Player	Rank^{1}	Seed
AUS	Aleksandar Vukic	138	1
FRA	Hugo Grenier	158	2
FRA	Enzo Couacaud	161	3
ITA	Federico Gaio	176	4
CZE	Vít Kopřiva	177	5
AUS	Max Purcell	179	6
IND	Ramkumar Ramanathan	185	7
TPE	Tseng Chun-hsin	190	8

- ^{1} Rankings are as of 7 February 2022.

=== Other entrants ===
The following players received wildcards into the singles main draw:

- (India) Arjun Kadhe
- (India) Adil Kalyanpur
- (India) Sidharth Rawat

The following players received entry from the qualifying draw:

- (Switzerland) Antoine Bellier
- (Australia) Andrew Harris
- (Greece) Markos Kalovelonis
- (Czech Republic) Dominik Palán
- (India) Mukund Sasikumar
- (India) Nitin Kumar Sinha

== Champions ==
=== Singles ===
- (Australia) Aleksandar Vukic def. (Bulgaria) Dimitar Kuzmanov 6–4, 6–4.

=== Doubles ===
- (Austria) Alexander Erler / (India) Arjun Kadhe def. (India) Saketh Myneni / (India) Ramkumar Ramanathan 6–3, 6–7^{(4–7)}, [10–7].
