= 2025 Bengaluru Open – Doubles =

Doubles
- 2025 Bengaluru Open

Final
- Champions: (India) Anirudh Chandrasekar (Chinese Taipei) Ray Ho
- Runners-up: (Australia) Blake Bayldon (Australia) Matthew Romios
- Score: 6–2, 6–4

Events
Singles	Doubles
- Bengaluru Open

Saketh Myneni and Ramkumar Ramanathan were the defending champions but lost in the semifinals to Anirudh Chandrasekar and Ray Ho.

Chandrasekar and Ho won the title after defeating Blake Bayldon and Matthew Romios 6–2, 6–4 in the final.

== Seeds ==
1. (India) Anirudh Chandrasekar / (Chinese Taipei) Ray Ho (champions)
2. (Australia) Blake Bayldon / (Australia) Matthew Romios (final)
3. (Denmark) Johannes Ingildsen / Ivan Liutarevich (first round)
4. (India) Niki Kaliyanda Poonacha / (Zimbabwe) Courtney John Lock (first round)

== Draw ==
Key

- Q = Qualifier
- WC = Wild card
- LL = Lucky loser
- Alt = Alternate
- ITF = ITF entry
- PR = Protected ranking
- SR = Special ranking
- SE = Special exempt
- JE = Junior exempt
- JR = Junior Accelerator Programme entrant
- CO = College Accelerator Programme entrant
- NG = Next Gen Accelerator Program entrant
- w/o = Walkover
- r = Retired
- d = Defaulted

=== Draw ===
First round
1	(India) A Chandrasekar (Chinese Taipei) R Ho	6	6
(India) Sai Karteek Reddy Ganta (Uzbekistan) K Sultanov	4	4
WC	(India) SDP Dev (India) Aryan Shah	4	6	[10]
(France) E Couacaud (Belgium) M Geerts	6	3	[6]
3	(Denmark) J Ingildsen; I Liutarevich	3	6	[11]
Alt	(Czech Republic) H Bartoň (Ukraine) Eric Vanshelboim	6	1	[13]
(India) S Myneni (India) R Ramanathan	6	7^{7}
(Italy) J Berrettini (Italy) E Dalla Valle	3	6^{4}
(United Kingdom) J Clarke (Australia) B Ellis	6	3	[5]
(Colombia) N Mejía (Australia) B Tomic	4	6	[10]
PR	(India) S Banthia (India) Parikshit Somani	6	6
4	(India) N Kaliyanda Poonacha (Zimbabwe) CJ Lock	4	3
WC	(India) A Kalyanpur (India) K Singh	1	6	[10]
Alt	(India) Nitin Kumar Sinha (India) Manish Sureshkumar	6	2	[4]
(Japan) K Isomura (South Africa) Kris van Wyk	6	3	[4]
2	(Australia) B Bayldon (Australia) MC Romios	4	6	[10]

Quarterfinals
1	(India) A Chandrasekar (Chinese Taipei) R Ho	7^{7}	7
WC	(India) SDP Dev (India) A Shah	6^{5}	5
Alt	(Czech Republic) H Bartoň (Ukraine) E Vanshelboim	3	3
(India) S Myneni (India) R Ramanathan	6	6
(Colombia) N Mejía (Australia) B Tomic	5	0
PR	(India) S Banthia (India) P Somani	7	6
WC	(India) A Kalyanpur (India) K Singh	2	4
2	(Australia) B Bayldon (Australia) MC Romios	6	6

Semifinals
1	(India) A Chandrasekar (Chinese Taipei) R Ho	6	2	[10]
(India) S Myneni (India) R Ramanathan	4	6	[8]
PR	(India) S Banthia (India) P Somani	3	6^{6}
2	(Australia) B Bayldon (Australia) MC Romios	6	7^{8}

Final
1	(India) A Chandrasekar (Chinese Taipei) R Ho	6	6
2	(Australia) B Bayldon (Australia) MC Romios	2	4
