= 2017 Bengaluru Open – Singles =

Singles
- 2017 Bengaluru Open

Final
- Champion: (India) Sumit Nagal
- Runner-up: (United Kingdom) Jay Clarke
- Score: 6–3, 3–6, 6–2

Events
Singles	Doubles
- Bengaluru Open

James Ward was the defending champion but chose not to defend his title.

Sumit Nagal won the title after defeating Jay Clarke 6–3, 3–6, 6–2 in the final.

== Seeds ==
1. (Slovenia) Blaž Kavčič (quarterfinals)
2. (Spain) Adrián Menéndez Maceiras (first round)
3. (India) Yuki Bhambri (semifinals)
4. (Sweden) Elias Ymer (second round)
5. (India) Ramkumar Ramanathan (second round)
6. (United States) Evan King (first round)
7. (Serbia) Peđa Krstin (first round, retired)
8. (Kazakhstan) Aleksandr Nedovyesov (second round)

== Draw ==
Key

- Q = Qualifier
- WC = Wild card
- LL = Lucky loser
- Alt = Alternate
- ITF = ITF entry
- PR = Protected ranking
- SR = Special ranking
- SE = Special exempt
- JE = Junior exempt
- JR = Junior Accelerator Programme entrant
- CO = College Accelerator Programme entrant
- NG = Next Gen Accelerator Program entrant
- w/o = Walkover
- r = Retired
- d = Defaulted

=== Finals ===
Semifinals
(India) Sumit Nagal	6	6
3	(India) Yuki Bhambri	4	0
(United Kingdom) Jay Clarke	6	6
(Chinese Taipei) Yang Tsung-hua	3	4

Final
(India) Sumit Nagal	6	3	6
(United Kingdom) Jay Clarke	3	6	2

=== Top half ===
First round
1	(Slovenia) B Kavčič	6	6^{0}	7^{8}
(Bosnia and Herzegovina) T Brkić	2	7^{7}	6^{6}
WC	(India) V Vardhan	3	3
(Spain) M Vilella Martínez	6	6
(India) S Nagal	6	6
Q	(India) VS Prashanth	2	0
(United Kingdom) B Klein	6	1
7	(Serbia) P Krstin	4	0^{r}
3	(India) Y Bhambri	6	6
(India) S Balaji	3	3
LL	(Japan) N Nakagawa	6^{5}	3
(Spain) Pedro Martínez	7^{7}	6
(France) G Blancaneaux	6^{2}	3
(Australia) M Polmans	7^{7}	6
(India) P Gunneswaran	6	6
6	(United States) E King	4	4

Second round
1	(Slovenia) B Kavčič	6	3	6
(Spain) M Vilella Martínez	4	6	3
(India) S Nagal	6	4	7
(United Kingdom) B Klein	4	6	5
3	(India) Y Bhambri	6	7^{7}
(Spain) P Martínez	2	6^{0}
(Australia) M Polmans	2	7^{7}	1
(India) P Gunneswaran	6	6^{1}	6

Quarterfinals
1	(Slovenia) B Kavčič	3	4
(India) S Nagal	6	6
3	(India) Y Bhambri	7	6
(India) P Gunneswaran	5	2

Semifinals
(India) S Nagal	6	6
3	(India) Y Bhambri	4	0

=== Bottom half ===
First round
5	(India) R Ramanathan	4	6	6
(France) H Grenier	6	4	3
(United Kingdom) J Clarke	6	6
Q	(India) Sidharth Rawat	3	3
(Japan) K Uchida	3	4
(Croatia) A Pavić	6	6
WC	(India) Suraj Prabodh	4	6^{2}
4	(Sweden) E Ymer	6	7^{7}
8	(Kazakhstan) A Nedovyesov	6	6
Q	(Croatia) M Sabanov	4	1
WC	(India) Dalwinder Singh	3	4
LL	(France) A Escoffier	6	6
(Chinese Taipei) T-h Yang	7^{7}	3
(Spain) B Zapata Miralles	6^{1}	0^{r}
Q	(Croatia) B Gojo	6	1	7
2	(Spain) A Menéndez Maceiras	3	6	5

Second round
5	(India) R Ramanathan	7^{7}	2	4
(United Kingdom) J Clarke	6^{5}	6	6
(Croatia) A Pavić	6	6^{2}	7^{7}
4	(Sweden) E Ymer	3	7^{7}	6^{5}
8	(Kazakhstan) A Nedovyesov	3	6	3
LL	(France) A Escoffier	6	2	6
(Chinese Taipei) T-h Yang	2	6	6
Q	(Croatia) B Gojo	6	4	2

Quarterfinals
(United Kingdom) J Clarke	6	4	7^{7}
(Croatia) A Pavić	2	6	6^{1}
LL	(France) A Escoffier	4	4
(Chinese Taipei) T-h Yang	6	6

Semifinals
(United Kingdom) J Clarke	6	6
(Chinese Taipei) T-h Yang	3	4
