= 2017 Bengaluru Open =

- Date: 20–25 November
- Edition: 2nd
- Draw: 32S / 16D
- Surface: Hard
- Location: Bangalore, India

Champions

Singles
- (India) Sumit Nagal

Doubles
- (Russia) Mikhail Elgin / (India) Divij Sharan
- Bengaluru Open

The 2017 Bengaluru Open was a professional tennis tournament played on hard courts. It was the second edition of the tournament which was part of the 2017 ATP Challenger Tour. It took place in Bangalore, India from 20 to 25 November 2017.

== Singles main-draw entrants ==
=== Seeds ===
Country	Player	Rank^{1}	Seed
SLO	Blaž Kavčič	102	1
ESP	Adrián Menéndez Maceiras	127	2
IND	Yuki Bhambri	137	3
SWE	Elias Ymer	146	4
IND	Ramkumar Ramanathan	150	5
USA	Evan King	197	6
SRB	Peđa Krstin	221	7
KAZ	Aleksandr Nedovyesov	245	8

- ^{1} Rankings are as of 13 November 2017.

=== Other entrants ===
The following players received wildcards into the singles main draw:

- (India) Suraj Prabodh
- (India) Dalwinder Singh
- (India) Vishnu Vardhan

The following players received entry from the qualifying draw:

- (Croatia) Borna Gojo
- (India) Vijay Sundar Prashanth
- (India) Sidharth Rawat
- (Croatia) Matej Sabanov

The following players received entry as lucky losers:

- (France) Antoine Escoffier
- (Japan) Naoki Nakagawa

== Champions ==
=== Singles ===
- (India) Sumit Nagal def. (United Kingdom) Jay Clarke 6–3, 3–6, 6–2.

=== Doubles ===
- (Russia) Mikhail Elgin / (India) Divij Sharan def. (Croatia) Ivan Sabanov / (Croatia) Matej Sabanov 6–3, 6–0.
