= 2024 Bengaluru Open =

- Date: 12–18 February
- Edition: 8th
- Surface: Hard
- Location: Bangalore, India

Champions

Singles
- (Italy) Stefano Napolitano

Doubles
- (India) Saketh Myneni / (India) Ramkumar Ramanathan
- Bengaluru Open

The 2024 Bengaluru Open was a professional tennis tournament played on hard courts. It was the eighth edition of the tournament which was part of the 2024 ATP Challenger Tour. It took place in Bangalore, India from 12 to 18 February 2024.

== Singles main-draw entrants ==
=== Seeds ===
Country	Player	Rank^{1}	Seed
ITA	Luca Nardi	114	1
IND	Sumit Nagal	121	2
CRO	Duje Ajduković	125	3
FRA	Benjamin Bonzi	126	4
AUS	Adam Walton	180	5
~~FRA~~	~~Ugo Blanchet~~	~~205~~	~~6~~
ITA	Stefano Napolitano	214	7
ESP	Oriol Roca Batalla	216	8
KOR	Hong Seong-chan	223	9

- ^{1} Rankings are as of 5 February 2024.

=== Other entrants ===
The following players received wildcards into the singles main draw:

- (India) S D Prajwal Dev
- (Canada) Vasek Pospisil
- (India) Ramkumar Ramanathan

The following players received entry into the singles main draw as alternates:

- (Italy) Enrico Dalla Valle
- (Tunisia) Moez Echargui

The following players received entry from the qualifying draw:

- (Belgium) Raphaël Collignon
- (Australia) Bernard Tomic
- (Chinese Taipei) Tseng Chun-hsin
- (Ukraine) Eric Vanshelboim
- (Italy) Samuel Vincent Ruggeri
- Alexey Zakharov

The following player received entry as a lucky loser:

- (France) Dan Added

== Champions ==
=== Singles ===
- (Italy) Stefano Napolitano def. (South Korea) Hong Seong-chan 4–6, 6–3, 6–3.

=== Doubles ===
- (India) Saketh Myneni / (India) Ramkumar Ramanathan def. (France) Constantin Bittoun Kouzmine / (France) Maxime Janvier 6–3, 6–4.
