= Brandon Holt =

American tennis player (born 1998)

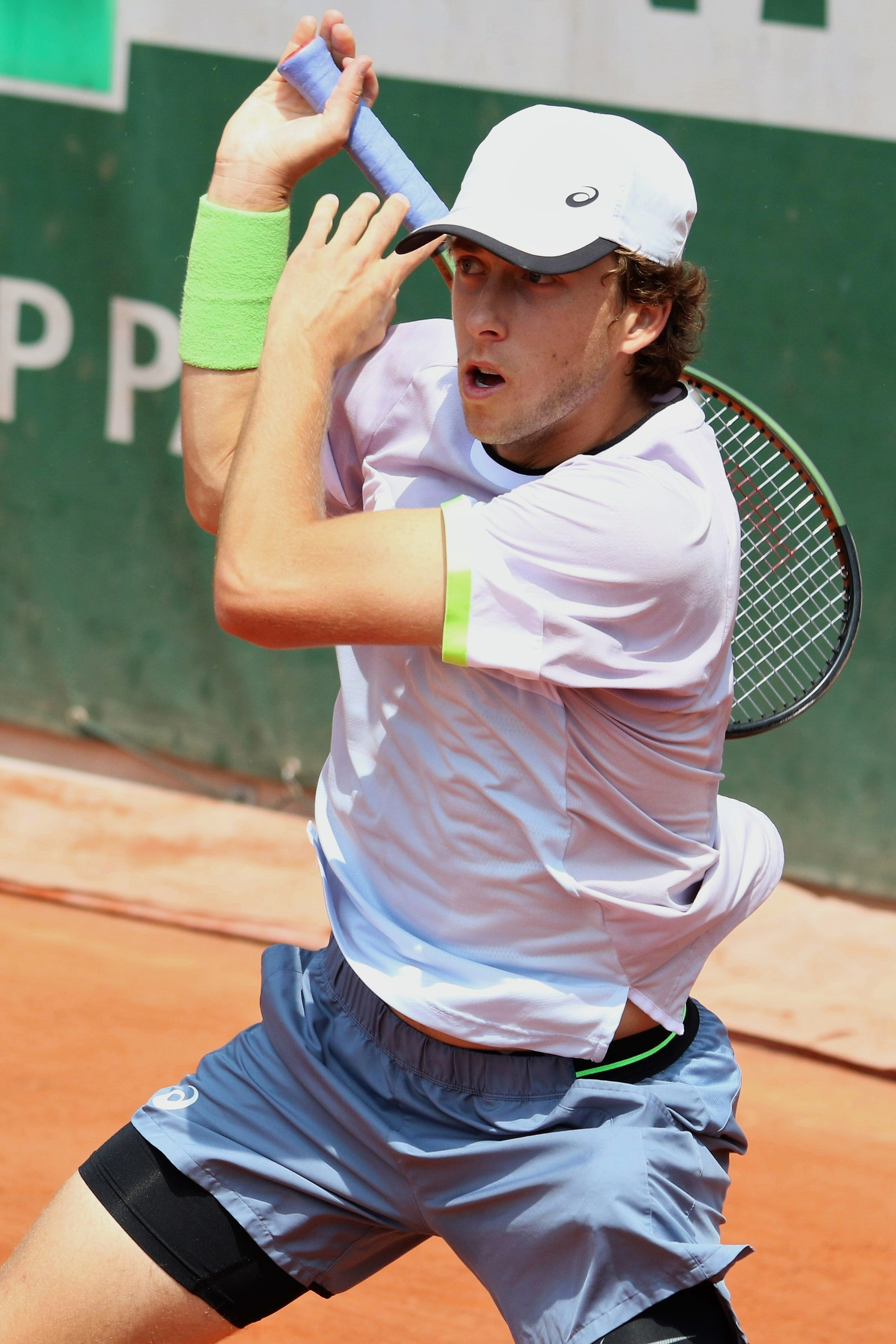
- Holt at the 2023 French Open
- Country (sports): United States
- Residence: Rolling Hills, California, U.S.
- Born: April 6, 1998 (age 28) Torrance, California, U.S.
- Height: 6 ft 1 in (1.85 m)
- Turned pro: 2020
- Plays: Right-handed (two-handed backhand)
- College: University of Southern California
- Coach: Beau Treyz
- Prize money: US $1,159,551

Singles
- Career record: 3–15
- Career titles: 0
- Highest ranking: No. 99 (June 30, 2025)
- Current ranking: No. 655 (August 31, 2026)

Grand Slam singles results
- Australian Open: 2R (2023)
- French Open: Q1 (2023, 2025)
- Wimbledon: 1R (2025)
- US Open: 2R (2022)

Doubles
- Career record: 0–3
- Career titles: 0
- Highest ranking: No. 473 (February 10, 2020)

Grand Slam doubles results
- US Open: 1R (2022)
- Last updated on: September 1, 2026.

Brandon Holt (born April 6, 1998) is an American professional tennis player. Holt has a career-high ATP singles ranking of world No. 99 achieved on 29 June 2025 and a doubles ranking of No. 473 achieved on 10 February 2020.

Holt is the son of former professional tennis player Tracy Austin, a former WTA World No. 1 and two-time US Open Women's Singles champion.

== College career ==
Holt played collegiate tennis for the University of Southern California from 2016 to 2020, where he was named an All-American athlete by the Intercollegiate Tennis Association (ITA) for three consecutive seasons, before turning professional shortly thereafter.

== Professional career ==
=== 2020-2022: Turning Pro, Grand Slam debut and first win ===
Ranked No. 303, Holt made his Grand Slam debut at the 2022 US Open as a qualifier after defeating Dimitar Kuzmanov in the last round of qualifying. He won his first Grand Slam level match, upsetting 10th seed and world No. 12 Taylor Fritz. This was also Holt's first career win on the ATP Tour and his first top-15 win. He lost in the second round to Pedro Cachín in five sets.

=== 2023: Masters debut ===
Holt qualified and made his major debut at the 2023 Australian Open, defeating Marco Trungelliti in the last round of qualifying. He defeated fellow qualifier Aleksandar Vukic in five sets, before losing in the second round to 24th seed Roberto Bautista Agut in another match which went five sets.

He qualified for the 2023 Dallas Open but lost to J. J. Wolf in straight sets. Holt made his Masters 1000 main draw debut in Indian Wells as a wildcard, losing in straight sets to Thanasi Kokkinakis.

=== 2024: First Challenger final ===
Holt qualified for the 2024 Los Cabos Open but lost to fellow qualifier Aleksandar Kovacevic in straight sets. Following this result and two Challenger finals, he returned to the top 250 on 16 June 2024.

Ranked No. 227, he also qualified for the main draw of the 2024 Cincinnati Open, losing to Arthur Fils in the first round.

=== 2025: Maiden Challenger title, top 100 ===
Between January and early March 2025 Holt appeared in three ATP Challenger Tour finals, winning two, including the 2025 Bengaluru Open 125 Challenger. These results led to a new career high singles ranking of No. 111 on 3 March 2025.

Following his first round win over Benjamin Bonzi, after qualifying for the main draw at the 2025 Mallorca Championships, Holt reached the top 100 at world No. 99 on 30 June 2025.

== Personal life ==
Holt is the son of former professional tennis player Tracy Austin, a former WTA World No. 1 and two-time US Open Women's Singles champion. His uncles Jeff and John, and his aunt Pam are also former professional tennis players.

== Performance timeline ==
Key
W	F	SF	QF	#R	RR	Q#	DNQ	A	NH

(W) winner; (F) finalist; (SF) semifinalist; (QF) quarterfinalist; (#R) rounds 4, 3, 2, 1; (RR) round-robin stage; (Q#) qualification round; (DNQ) did not qualify; (A) absent; (NH) not held; (SR) strike rate (events won / competed); (W–L) win–loss record.

=== Singles ===
Tournament	2022	2023	2024	2025	2026	SR	W–L	Win %
Grand Slam tournaments
Australian Open	A	2R	A	Q2	Q2	0 / 1	1–1	50%
French Open	A	Q3	A	Q1	A	0 / 0	0–0	–
Wimbledon	A	Q1	A	1R	A	0 / 1	0–1	0%
US Open	2R	Q2	Q1	1R	A	0 / 2	1–2	33%
Win–loss	1–1	1-1	0–0	0–2	0–0	0 / 4	2–4	33%
ATP Masters 1000
Indian Wells Masters	Q1	R1	A	Q1		0 / 1	0–1	0%
Miami Open	A	Q1	A	R1		0 / 1	0–1	0%
Monte Carlo Masters	A	A	A	A		0 / 0	0–0	–
Madrid Open	A	A	A	A		0 / 0	0-0	–
Italian Open	A	A	A	A		0 / 0	0–0	–
Canadian Open	A	A	A	A		0 / 0	0–0	–
Cincinnati Masters	A	Q1	R1	R1		0 / 2	0–2	0%
Shanghai Masters	NH	A	A	Q1		0 / 0	0–0	–
Paris Masters	A	A	A	A		0 / 0	0–0	–
Win–loss	0–0	0–1	0–1	0–2	0–0	0 / 4	0–4	0%

== ATP Challenger and ITF Tour finals ==
=== Singles: 15 (10 titles, 5 runner-ups) ===
Legend ATP Challenger Tour (2–3) ITF Futures/WTT (8–2)	Finals by surface Hard (10–5) Clay (0–0) Grass (0–0) Carpet (0–0)

Result	W–L	Date	Tournament	Tier	Surface	Opponent	Score
Loss	0–1	Jan 2024	Southern California Open, US	Challenger	Hard	(United States) Mitchell Krueger	6–4, 3–6, 4–6
Loss	0–2	Jun 2024	Tyler Tennis Championships, US	Challenger	Hard	(Japan) James Trotter	2–6, 6–7^{(3–7)}
Win	1–2	Jan 2025	Nonthaburi Challenger, Thailand	Challenger	Hard	(Czech Republic) Vít Kopřiva	6–3, 6–2
Loss	1–3	Feb 2025	Pune Challenger, India	Challenger	Hard	(Czech Republic) Dalibor Svrčina	6–7^{(3–7)}, 1–6
Win	2–3	Feb 2025	Bengaluru Open, India	Challenger	Hard	(Japan) Shintaro Mochizuki	6–3, 6–3

Result	W–L	Date	Tournament	Tier	Surface	Opponent	Score
Win	1–0	Sep 2018	USA F24, Claremont	Futures	Hard	(United States) Martin Redlicki	3–6, 6–3, 6–2
Win	2–0	Jan 2019	M25 Los Angeles, US	WTT	Hard	(Ecuador) Emilio Gómez	6–3, 6–3
Loss	2–1	Jun 2019	M25 Wichita, US	WTT	Hard	(United States) Sam Riffice	1–6, 4–6
Win	3–1	Jan 2022	M15 Cancún, Mexico	WTT	Hard	(United States) Matt Kuhar	6–0, 6–3
Win	4–1	Jan 2022	M15 Cancún, Mexico	WTT	Hard	(Mexico) Luis Patiño	6–0, 6–3
Win	5–1	Jan 2022	M15 Cancún, Mexico	WTT	Hard	(United States) Emil Reinberg	7–5, 6–0
Win	6–1	Apr 2022	M25 Nottingham, UK	WTT	Hard	(United Kingdom) Henry Patten	7–6^{(7–2)}, 7–5
Win	7–1	May 2022	M15 Cancún, Mexico	WTT	Hard	(Luxembourg) Alex Knaff	6–1, 6–2
Loss	7–2	Jun 2022	M15 Los Angeles, US	WTT	Hard	(United States) Zachary Svajda	5–7, 4–6
Win	8–2	Mar 2024	M25 Bakersfield, US	WTT	Hard	(France) Timo Legout	6–4, 6–4

=== Doubles: 6 (5 titles, 1 runner-up) ===
Legend ATP Challenger Tour (0–0) ITF Futures/WTT (5–1)	Finals by surface Hard (5–1) Clay (0–0) Grass (0–0) Carpet (0–0)

Result	W–L	Date	Tournament	Tier	Surface	Partner	Opponents	Score
Win	1–0	Sep 2015	USA F28, Laguna Niguel	Futures	Hard	(United States) Riley Smith	(United States) Will Spencer (United States) Junior A. Ore	6–4, 6–3
Win	2–0	Jun 2017	USA F17, Winston-Salem	Futures	Hard	(United States) Riley Smith	(United States) Christopher Eubanks (United States) Kevin King	7–6^{(7–4)}, 6–3
Win	3–0	Jul 2017	USA F24, Champaign	Futures	Hard	(United States) Riley Smith	(United States) Tomas Stillman (United States) Shane Vinsant	3–6, 6–1, [12–10]
Win	4–0	Jul 2018	USA F19, Wichita	Futures	Hard	(France) Maxime Cressy	(United States) Hunter Johnson (United States) Yates Johnson	3–6, 6–2, [10–6]
Win	5–0	Jun 2019	M25 Wichita, US	WTT	Hard	(Moldova) Alexander Cozbinov	(United States) Jacob Dunbar (United Kingdom) David Fox	7–6^{(7–5)}, 6–3
Loss	5–1	Jan 2020	M25 Los Angeles, US	WTT	Hard	(Switzerland) Sandro Ehrat	(United States) Riley Smith (Israel) Daniel Cukierman	6–7^{(4–7)}, 6–7^{(5–7)}

== Junior Grand Slam finals ==
=== Doubles: 1 (1 runner-up) ===
Result	Year	Tournament	Surface	Partner	Opponents	Score
Loss	2015	US Open	Hard	(United States) Riley Smith	(Canada) Félix Auger-Aliassime (Canada) Denis Shapovalov	5–7, 6–7^{(3–7)}
