= Ray Ho =

Taiwanese tennis player (born 2000)

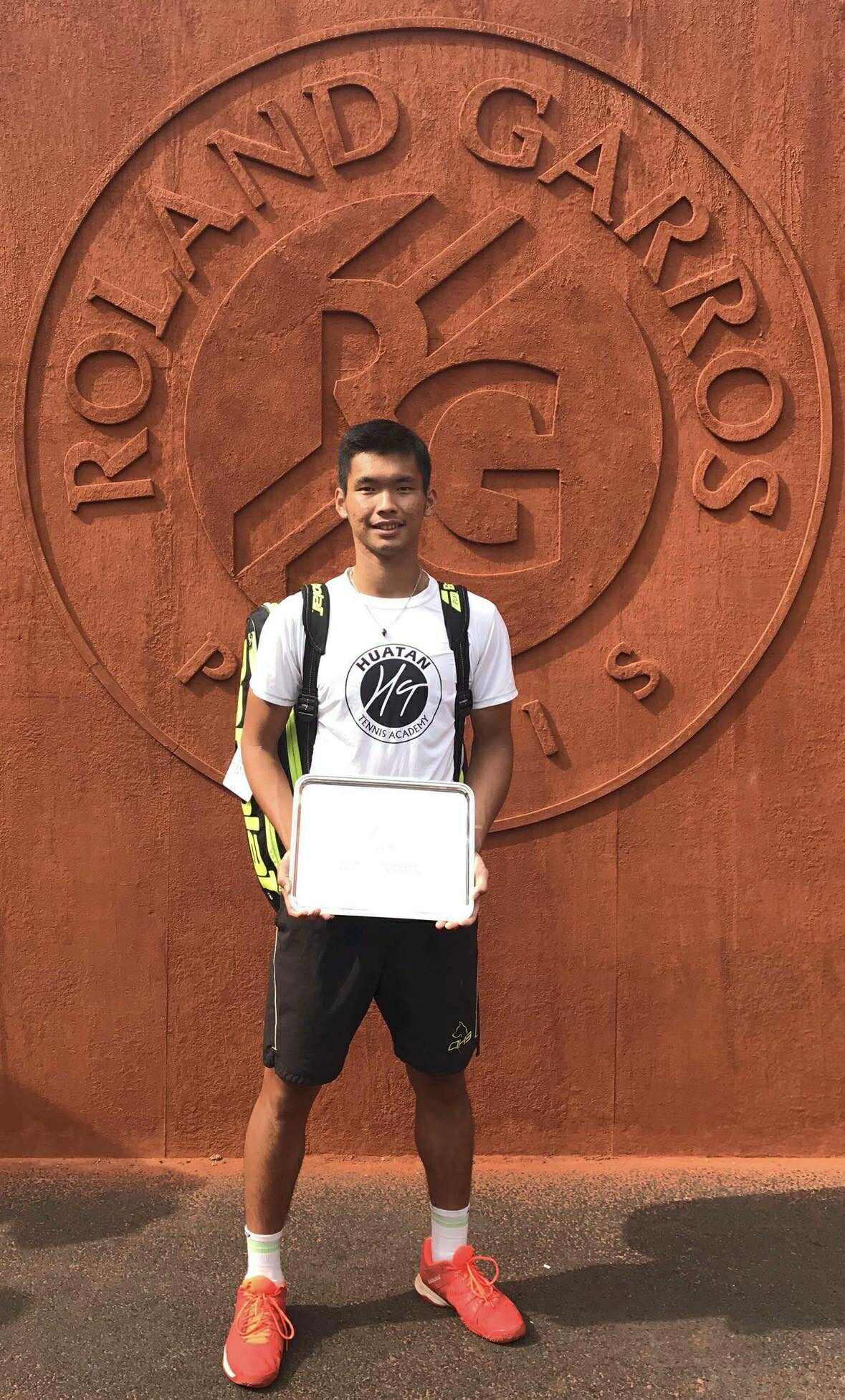
- 2018 French Open Boy Doubles Finalist
- Country (sports): Taiwan
- Born: 13 February 2000 (age 26)
- Height: 1.88 m (6 ft 2 in)
- Plays: Left-handed (two-handed backhand)
- Prize money: US $280,151

Singles
- Career record: 0–0
- Career titles: 0
- Highest ranking: No. 715 (18 July 2022)

Doubles
- Career record: 11–12
- Career titles: 0; 11 Challenger
- Highest ranking: No. 60 (16 February 2026)
- Current ranking: No. 60 (16 February 2026)

Grand Slam doubles results
- Australian Open: 2R (2026)
- French Open: 2R (2026)
- Wimbledon: 3R (2026)
- US Open: 2R (2025)
- Last updated on: 16 February 2026.

Ray Ho (born 13 February 2000) is a Taiwanese professional tennis player who specializes in doubles. He has a career-high ATP doubles ranking of world No. 60 achieved on 16 February 2026 and a singles ranking of No. 715 achieved on 18 July 2022. He plays mostly on the ATP Challenger Tour, where he has won eleven titles in doubles.

Ho represents Chinese Taipei (Taiwan) at the Davis Cup.

== Junior career ==
In June 2018, Ho was a runner-up in the boys' doubles category at the French Open, with compatriot Tseng Chun-hsin. The pair lost to Ondřej Štyler and Naoki Tajima in the final.

== Career ==
Partnering Anirudh Chandrasekar, he won the doubles title at the 2025 Bengaluru Open, defeating Blake Bayldon and Matthew Romios in the final.

== ATP Tour finals ==
=== Doubles: 1 (runner-up) ===
Legend Grand Slam (–) ATP 1000 (–) ATP 500 (0–1) ATP 250 (–)	Finals by surface Hard (0–1) Clay (–) Grass (–)	Finals by setting Outdoor (–) Indoor (0–1)

Result	W–L	Date	Tournament	Tier	Surface	Partner	Opponents	Score
Loss	0–1	Feb 2026	Rotterdam Open, Netherlands	ATP 500	Hard (i)	(Germany) Hendrik Jebens	(Italy) Simone Bolelli (Italy) Andrea Vavassori	3–6, 4–6

== ATP Challenger and ITF Tour Finals ==
=== Singles: 2 (2 runner-ups) ===
Legend ATP Challenger Tour (–) ITF WTT (0–2)	Finals by surface Hard (0–1) Clay (0–1)

Result	W–L	Date	Tournament	Tier	Surface	Opponent	Score
Loss	0–1	Jan 2019	M15 Anning, China	WTT	Clay	(Argentina) Agustín Velotti	4–6, 3–6
Loss	0–2	May 2022	M15 Monastir, Tunisia	WTT	Hard	(China) Bu Yunchaokete	4–6, 5–7

=== Doubles: 19 (12 titles, 7 runner-ups) ===
Legend ATP Challenger Tour (12–7)	Finals by surface Hard (11–6) Clay (1–1)

Result	W–L	Date	Tournament	Tier	Surface	Partner	Opponents	Score
Win	1–0	Sep 2023	Zhangjiagang, China	Challenger	Hard	(Australia) Matthew Romios	(Philippines) Francis Alcantara (China) Sun Fajing	6–3, 6–4
Loss	1–1	Sep 2023	Guangzhou, China	Challenger	Hard	(Australia) Matthew Romios	(Switzerland) Antoine Bellier (Switzerland) Luca Castelnuovo	3–6, 6–7^{(5–7)}
Loss	1–2	Nov 2023	Yokohama, Japan	Challenger	Hard	(Australia) Calum Puttergill	(Sweden) Filip Bergevi (Netherlands) Mick Veldheer	6–2, 5–7, [9–11]
Loss	1–3	Dec 2023	Yokkaichi, Japan	Challenger	Hard	(Australia) Calum Puttergill	(United States) Evan King (United States) Reese Stalder	5–7, 4–6
Win	2–3	Apr 2024	Busan, South Korea	Challenger	Hard	(South Korea) Nam Ji-sung	(South Korea) Chung Yun-seong (Chinese Taipei) Hsu Yu-hsiou	6–2, 6–4
Win	3–3	May 2024	Taipei, Taiwan	Challenger	Hard	(South Korea) Nam Ji-sung	(Japan) Toshihide Matsui (Japan) Kaito Uesugi	6–2, 6–2
Loss	3–4	Oct 2024	Shenzhen, China	Challenger	Hard	(United Kingdom) Joshua Paris	(Thailand) Pruchya Isaro (China) Wang Aoran	6–7^{(4–7)}, 3–6
Win	4–4	Jan 2025	Nonthaburi, Thailand	Challenger	Hard	(Austria) Neil Oberleitner	(Israel) Daniel Cukierman (United Kingdom) Joshua Paris	6–4, 7–6^{(7–5)}
Win	5–4	Jan 2025	Nonthaburi, Thailand (2)	Challenger	Hard	(Austria) Neil Oberleitner	(Thailand) Pruchya Isaro (China) Wang Aoran	6–3, 6–4
Win	6–4	Mar 2025	Bengaluru, India	Challenger	Hard	(India) Anirudh Chandrasekar	(Australia) Blake Bayldon (Australia) Matthew Romios	6–2, 6–4
Loss	6–5	Apr 2025	Busan, South Korea	Challenger	Hard	(Australia) Matthew Romios	(Japan) Rio Noguchi (Japan) Yuta Shimizu	6–7^{(7–9)}, 4–6
Win	7–5	Apr 2025	Gwangju, South Korea	Challenger	Hard	(Australia) Matthew Romios	(United States) Vasil Kirkov (Netherlands) Bart Stevens	6–3, 7–6^{(8–6)}
Win	8–5	May 2025	Guangzhou, China	Challenger	Hard	(Australia) Matthew Romios	(United States) Vasil Kirkov (Netherlands) Bart Stevens	6–3, 6–4
Loss	8–6	May 2025	Wuxi, China	Challenger	Hard	(Australia) Matthew Romios	(United States) Vasil Kirkov (Netherlands) Bart Stevens	3–6, 7–5, [10–6]
Loss	8–7	Jun 2025	Milan, Italy	Challenger	Clay	(United States) George Goldhoff	(Australia) Matthew Romios (United States) Ryan Seggerman	6–3, 5–7, [8–10]
Win	9–7	Jul 2025	San Marino, San Marino	Challenger	Clay	(Poland) Karol Drzewiecki	(Slovakia) Miloš Karol (Ukraine) Vitaliy Sachko	7–5, 7–6^{(7–3)}
Win	10–7	Aug 2025	Porto, Portugal	Challenger	Hard	(United States) George Goldhoff	(Colombia) Nicolás Barrientos (Belgium) Joran Vliegen	6–4, 6–4
Win	11–7	Oct 2025	Suzhou, China	Challenger	Hard	(Australia) Blake Bayldon	(India) S D Prajwal Dev (India) Nitin Kumar Sinha	6–4, 6–3
Win	12–7	Oct 2026	Jinan, China	Challenger	Hard	(Japan) Jay Friend	(Netherlands) Thijmen Loof (Japan) Kaito Uesugi	2–6, 7–6^{(7–5)}, [10–4]

== Junior Grand Slam finals ==
=== Doubles: 1 (runner-up) ===
Result	Year	Tournament	Surface	Partner	Opponents	Score
Loss	2018	French Open	Clay	(Chinese Taipei) Tseng Chun-hsin	(Czech Republic) Ondřej Štyler (Japan) Naoki Tajima	4–6, 4–6
