= Anirudh Chandrasekar =

Indian tennis player

- Country (sports): India
- Born: 11 July 1998 (age 28) Chennai, India
- Height: 1.80 m (5 ft 11 in)
- Plays: Left-handed (two-handed backhand)
- Coach: Vignesh Peranamullar
- Prize money: US $301,550

Singles
- Career record: 0–0
- Career titles: 0
- Highest ranking: No. 1,014 (1 October 2018)

Doubles
- Career record: 13–23
- Career titles: 10 Challenger, 5 Futures
- Highest ranking: No. 84 (24 August 2026)
- Current ranking: No. 84 (24 August 2026)

Grand Slam doubles results
- Australian Open: 1R (2024, 2025)
- French Open: 1R (2026)
- Wimbledon: 1R (2026)
- US Open: 2R (2025)
- Last updated on: 25 August 2026.

Anirudh Chandrasekar (born 11 July 1998) is an Indian tennis player who specializes in doubles. He has a career high ATP doubles ranking of No. 84 achieved on 24 August 2026 and a singles ranking of No. 1,014 achieved on 1 October 2018.

== Career ==
In 2023, Chandrasekar has won his first three ATP Challenger doubles titles at the Pune Challenger, the Challenger Club Els Gorchs and the Internazionali di Tennis Città di Vicenza with Vijay Sundar Prashanth. He won the 4th Challenger title al the 2024 Open de Oeiras II with Arjun Kadhe and the fifth at the 2025 Jingshan Tennis Open with Reese Stalder.

== Tour finals ==
=== Doubles: 43 (16–27) ===
Legend ATP Challenger (11–14) ITF Futures (5–13)	Finals by surface Hard (9–15) Clay (6–11) Grass (1–1) Carpet (0–0)

Result	W–L	Date	Tournament	Tier	Surface	Partner	Opponents	Score
Loss	0–1	Sep 2015	India F15, Madurai	Futures	Hard	(India) Vignesh Peranamallur	(India) Sumit Nagal (India) Vijay Sundar Prashanth	3–6, 5–7
Loss	0–2	Sep 2016	Egypt F24, Cairo	Futures	Clay	(India) Vignesh Peranamallur	(Argentina) Gastón-Arturo Grimolizzi (Argentina) Mateo Nicolás Martínez	5–7, 4–6
Loss	0–3	Sep 2017	India F7, Chennai	Futures	Clay	(India) Vignesh Peranamallur	(South Korea) Lee Tae-woo (South Korea) Moon Ju-hae	2–6, 4–6
Loss	0–4	Jun 2018	Zimbabwe F1, Harare	Futures	Hard	(India) Vignesh Peranamallur	(Zimbabwe) Benjamin Lock (Zimbabwe) Courtney John Lock	3–6, 0–6
Loss	0–5	Aug 2018	China F13, Anning	Futures	Clay	(India) Vignesh Peranamallur	(New Zealand) Rhett Purcell (New Zealand) Olly Sadler	3–6, 2–6
Loss	0–6	Sep 2018	China F14, Anning	Futures	Clay	(India) Vignesh Peranamallur	(Australia) Jeremy Beale (Switzerland) Luca Castelnuovo	3–6, 6–3, [3–10]
Loss	0–7	Sep 2018	Egypt F18, Cairo	Futures	Clay	(India) Aryan Goveas	(Austria) Alexander Erler (Greece) Markos Kalovelonis	4–6, 6–7^{(3–7)}
Loss	0–8	Jan 2019	M15 Anning, China	World Tennis Tour	Clay	(India) Vijay Sundar Prashanth	(Chinese Taipei) Chen Ti (Chinese Taipei) Ray Ho	4–6, 6–7^{(8–10)}
Win	1–8	May 2019	M15 Kampala, Uganda	World Tennis Tour	Clay	(India) Niki Kaliyanda Poonacha	(Republic of Ireland) Simon Carr (United Kingdom) Ryan James Storrie	6–3, 6–4
Loss	1–9	May 2019	M15 Kampala, Uganda	World Tennis Tour	Clay	(India) Niki Kaliyanda Poonacha	(Republic of Ireland) Julian Bradley (Burundi) Guy Orly Iradukunda	4–6, 6–3, [6–10]
Win	2–9	Sep 2019	M15 Nanchang, China	World Tennis Tour	Clay	(Switzerland) Luca Castelnuovo	(China) Wang Ruixuan (China) Yu Bingyu	6–2, 5–7, [10–8]
Loss	2–10	Sep 2019	M15 Nanchang, China	World Tennis Tour	Clay	(India) Vijay Sundar Prashanth	(Estonia) Vladimir Ivanov (Russia) Yan Sabanin	4–6, 5–7
Win	3–10	Oct 2019	M15 Nanchang, China	World Tennis Tour	Clay	(India) Vijay Sundar Prashanth	(Chinese Taipei) Ray Ho (Hong Kong) Yeung Pak-long	7–6^{(7–5)}, 6–4
Win	4–10	Nov 2021	M15 Indore, India	World Tennis Tour	Hard	(India) Nitin Kumar Sinha	(India) Niki Kaliyanda Poonacha (India) Vishnu Vardhan	6–4, 6–4
Loss	4–11	Mar 2022	M15 New Delhi, China	World Tennis Tour	Hard	(India) Vishnu Vardhan	(India) Yuki Bhambri (India) Saketh Myneni	4–6, 2–6
Loss	4–12	Apr 2022	M25 Nottingham, United Kingdom	World Tennis Tour	Hard	(India) Vijay Sundar Prashanth	(Belgium) Ruben Bemelmans (Belgium) Joris De Loore	5–7, 5–7
Loss	4–13	Apr 2022	M25 Nottingham, United Kingdom	World Tennis Tour	Hard	(India) Vijay Sundar Prashanth	(United Kingdom) Julian Cash (United Kingdom) Henry Patten	1–6, 4–6
Win	5–13	Jun 2022	M25 Arlon, Belgium	World Tennis Tour	Clay	(India) Vijay Sundar Prashanth	(Germany) Constantin Frantzen (Germany) Tim Sandkaulen	7–6^{(7–5)}, 6–4
Loss	5–14	Oct 2022	Fairfield, United States	Challenger	Hard	(India) Vijay Sundar Prashanth	(United Kingdom) Julian Cash (United Kingdom) Henry Patten	3–6, 1–6
Loss	5–15	Jan 2023	Quimper, France	Challenger	Hard	(India) Arjun Kadhe	(France) Sadio Doumbia (France) Fabien Reboul	2–6, 4–6
Loss	5–16	Feb 2023	Bangalore, India	Challenger	Hard	(India) Vijay Sundar Prashanth	(South Korea) Chung Yun-seong (Chinese Taipei) Hsu Yu-hsiou	6–3, 6–7^{(7–9)}, [9–11]
Win	6–16	Mar 2023	Pune, India	Challenger	Hard	(India) Vijay Sundar Prashanth	(Japan) Toshihide Matsui (Japan) Kaito Uesugi	6–1, 4–6, [10–3]
Win	7–16	Mar 2023	Les Franqueses del Vallès, Spain	Challenger	Hard	(India) Vijay Sundar Prashanth	(India) Purav Raja (India) Divij Sharan	7–5, 6–1
Loss	7–17	Apr 2023	Split, Croatia	Challenger	Clay	(India) Vijay Sundar Prashanth	(France) Sadio Doumbia (France) Fabien Reboul	4–6, 4–6
Win	8–17	Jun 2023	Vicenza, Italy	Challenger	Clay	(India) Vijay Sundar Prashanth	(Brazil) Fernando Romboli (Brazil) Marcelo Zormann	6–3, 6–2
Loss	8–18	Jul 2023	Salzburg, Austria	Challenger	Clay	(India) Vijay Sundar Prashanth	(Kazakhstan) Andrey Golubev (Ukraine) Denys Molchanov	4–6, 6–7^{(8–10)}
Loss	8–19	Aug 2023	Grodzisk Mazowiecki, Poland	Challenger	Hard	(India) Vijay Sundar Prashanth	(France) Théo Arribagé (France) Luca Sanchez	4–6, 4–6
Loss	8–20	Jan 2024	Quimper, France	Challenger	Hard	(India) Vijay Sundar Prashanth	(France) Manuel Guinard (France) Arthur Rinderknech	6–7^{(4–7)}, 3–6
Win	9–20	May 2024	Oeiras, Portugal	Challenger	Clay	(India) Arjun Kadhe	(Denmark) Johannes Ingildsen (Sweden) Simon Freund	7–5, 6–4
Loss	9–21	Aug 2024	Manacor, Spain	Challenger	Hard	(Spain) David Vega Hernandez	(Austria) David Pichler (Austria) Jurij Rodionov	6—1, 3—6, [7-10]
Win	10–21	Sep 2024	Villena, Spain	Challenger	Hard	(India) Niki Kaliyanda Poonacha	(Monaco) Romain Arneodo (Spain) Íñigo Cervantes	7–6^{(7–2)}, 6–4
Win	11–21	Feb 2025	Bengaluru, India	Challenger	Hard	(Chinese Taipei) Ray Ho	(Australia) Blake Bayldon (Australia) Matthew Romios	6–2, 6–4
Win	12–21	Mar 2025	Girona, Spain	Challenger	Clay	(Spain) David Vega Hernandez	(France) Grégoire Jacq (Brazil) Orlando Luz	6–4, 6–4
Win	13–21	Jul 2025	Lexington, US	Challenger	Hard	(India) Ramkumar Ramanathan	(Chinese Taipei) Hsu Yu-hsiou (Chinese Taipei) Huang Tsung-hao	6–4, 6–4
Win	14–21	Sep 2025	Jingshan, China	Challenger	Hard	(United States) Reese Stalder	(Chinese Taipei) Huang Tsung-hao (South Korea) Park Ui-sung	6–2, 2–6, [10–7]
Loss	14–22	Nov 2025	Brisbane, Australia	Challenger	Hard	(United States) Reese Stalder	(Australia) Matt Hulme (Australia) Kody Pearson	6–7^{(5–7)}, 6–3, [6–10]
Loss	14–23	Nov 2025	City of Playford, Australia	Challenger	Hard	(United States) Reese Stalder	(Australia) Jake Delaney (Australia) Li Tu	7–6^{(7–5)}, 5–7, [8–10]
Loss	14–24	Jan 2026	Nonthaburi, Thailand	Challenger	Hard	(Japan) Takeru Yuzuki	(India) Sriram Balaji (Austria) Neil Oberleitner	3–6, 6–7^{(6–8)}
Win	15–24	Apr 2026	Busan, South Korea	Challenger	Hard	(Japan) Takeru Yuzuki	(Netherlands) Jean-Julien Rojer (United States) Theodore Winegar	4–6, 6–3, [10–7]
Loss	15–25	Apr 2026	Gwangju, South Korea	Challenger	Hard	(Japan) Takeru Yuzuki	(United States) Mac Kiger (United States) Reese Stalder	4–6, 7–6^{(9–7)}, [8–10]
Loss	15–26	Jun 2026	Birmingham, United Kingdom	Challenger	Grass	(Japan) Takeru Yuzuki	(United Kingdom) Ben Jones (United Kingdom) Joshua Paris	4–6, 6–7^{(4–7)}
Win	16–26	Aug 2026	Cancún, Mexico	Challenger	Hard	(India) Sriram Balaji	Ivan Liutarevich (Mexico) Miguel Ángel Reyes-Varela	6–3, 7–6^{(7–4)}
Loss	16–27	Nov 2026	Taipei, Taiwan	Challenger	Hard (i)	(New Zealand) Ajeet Rai	(New Zealand) Finn Reynolds (New Zealand) James Watt	3–6, 2–6
