= Max Purcell =

Australian tennis player (born 1998)

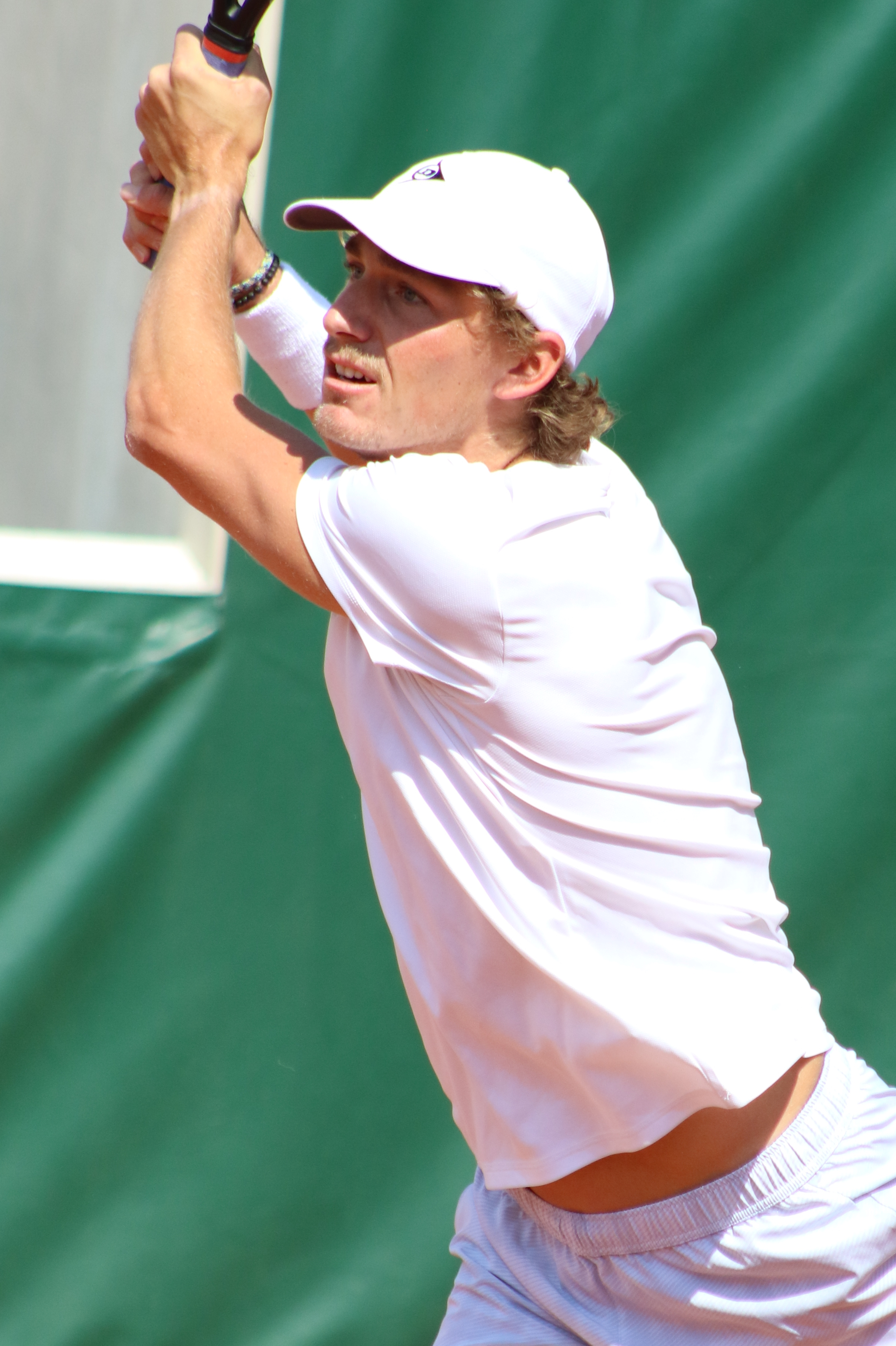
- Purcell at the 2021 French Open
- Country (sports): Australia
- Residence: Sydney, New South Wales, Australia
- Born: 3 April 1998 (age 28) Sydney, New South Wales, Australia
- Height: 1.85 m (6 ft 1 in)
- Turned pro: 2016
- Plays: Right-handed (two-handed backhand)
- Coach: Blaž Kavčič
- Prize money: US $4,695,213

Singles
- Career record: 32–53
- Career titles: 0
- Highest ranking: No. 40 (16 October 2023)
- Current ranking: No. 672 (21 September 2026)

Grand Slam singles results
- Australian Open: 2R (2024)
- French Open: 2R (2023)
- Wimbledon: 1R (2022, 2023, 2024)
- US Open: 2R (2024)

Other tournaments
- Olympic Games: 2R (2021)

Doubles
- Career record: 132–71
- Career titles: 8
- Highest ranking: No. 8 (9 September 2024)
- Current ranking: No. 627 (21 September 2026)

Grand Slam doubles results
- Australian Open: F (2020, 2022)
- French Open: 3R (2021, 2024)
- Wimbledon: W (2022)
- US Open: W (2024)

Other doubles tournaments
- Tour Finals: SF (2024)
- Olympic Games: 1R (2021)

Grand Slam mixed doubles results
- Australian Open: QF (2021)
- Wimbledon: 2R (2021)
- US Open: SF (2021)

Team competitions
- Davis Cup: F (2022); Record: 3–2
- Last updated on: 27 September 2026.

Max Purcell (born 3 April 1998) is an Australian professional tennis player. He has reached a career-high singles ranking of world No. 40 on 16 October 2023 and a doubles ranking of No. 8 on 9 September 2024. In doubles, he won two Grand Slam titles at the 2024 US Open with Jordan Thompson and at the 2022 Wimbledon Championships with Matthew Ebden. The pair also finished runners-up at the 2022 Australian Open. Purcell also reached the finals at the 2020 Australian Open with Luke Saville and at the 2024 Wimbledon with Thompson. In mixed doubles, Purcell reached the semifinals at the 2021 US Open with Dayana Yastremska. He represented Australia in both disciplines at the 2020 Olympic Games, partnering John Peers in doubles.

In April 2025, Purcell accepted to serve an 18-month competition ban, due to expire in June 2026, for an anti-doping rule violation.

== Professional career ==
=== 2016–2019: Early career ===
In July 2016, Purcell qualified for and won the Gimcheon Challenger in South Korea against fellow Australian Andrew Whittington. Purcell was ranked No. 762 in the world leading into the tournament, making him the second lowest-ranked player to win an ATP Challenger title in 16 years. He finished the season ranked 324 in the world.

In 2017, Purcell received a wildcard into the Australian Open doubles event, where he partnered Alex de Minaur. The duo lost in the opening round to Spanish pairing Guillermo García López and Pablo Carreño Busta. Purcell made four Futures Tour finals in 2017, claiming three titles. He finished the year ranked No. 277 in the world.

=== 2020: Australian Open doubles final ===
In January, Purcell made his Grand Slam singles debut after qualifying for the 2020 Australian Open. He lost to Jannik Sinner in the first round in straight sets. At the same tournament, he paired with Luke Saville as a wildcard in the Men's doubles, where they reached the final losing to 11th seeded pair American Rajeev Ram and Brit Joe Salisbury. The pair also reached their second final of the season of the 2020 Astana Open where they lost to Belgians Sander Gillé/Joran Vliegen.

=== 2021: ATP singles semifinal, Olympic debut ===
Purcell commenced the 2021 season at the 2021 Great Ocean Road Open, where he defeated Norbert Gombos for his first ATP main draw win. Purcell was defeated by Karen Khachanov in the second round.

Purcell earned his first win against an opponent in the top 20 after beating World No. 16 and top seed Gaël Monfils at the Eastbourne International as a lucky loser to reach his first ATP singles quarterfinal and then recorded another win over Andreas Seppi to reach his first semifinal. He lost to another Italian Lorenzo Sonego. Following this great run, in July he won his second Challenger singles title, the 2021 President's Cup in Nur Sultan. As a result, he entered the top 200 at a career-high in singles of No. 190 on 19 July 2021.

At the 2020 Tokyo Olympics, Purcell was entered as a last-minute alternate for Andy Murray, who had withdrawn due to a right quad injury. Purcell recorded his biggest career win and first over a top 20 player, defeating world no. 15 Félix Auger-Aliassime in straight sets. Purcell also replaced Alex de Minaur after he tested positive for COVID-19 in the doubles event, where he partnered John Peers but lost in the first round.

In August 2021, Purcell reached the third round of the 2021 Winston-Salem Open. He re-entered the ATP top 200 in singles as a result.

He reached the quarterfinals in doubles at the 2021 US Open partnering Matthew Ebden where they lost to 4th seeds and eventual champions Joe Salisbury and Rajeev Ram. He was also selected as a wildcard in the singles main draw for his debut at this Major but lost in the first round again to 13th seed Jannik Sinner.

On 20 September 2021, and following a quarterfinal result at Cary Challenger, Purcell achieved a career high singles ranking of World No. 189. He followed this by a final also in singles at the 2021 Columbus Challenger where he lost to Stefan Kozlov. He reached a career-high singles ranking of No. 175 and doubles ranking of No. 28 on 18 October 2021.

=== 2022: Wimbledon doubles champion, top 25 ===
In January 2022, Purcell made his debut representing Australia at the 2022 ATP Cup, losing to Jannik Sinner in the round robin stage. Purcell attempted to qualify for the Australian Open, but was eliminated in the second round.

In the men's doubles, Purcell partnered once again with Ebden. After defeating Jonathan Erlich and André Göransson in the first round, they went on to topple four seeded teams consecutively en route to Purcell's second men's doubles final and their maiden doubles final as a team overall. In the second round, Ebden and Purcell beat fourth seeds Juan Sebastián Cabal and Robert Farah from a set down before reaching the third round, where they defeated thirteenth seeds Raven Klaasen and Ben McLachlan in straight sets to make the quarterfinals. This showing earned the pair their second Grand Slam quarterfinal appearance together. In the quarterfinals, they knocked out tenth seeds Wesley Koolhof and Neal Skupski from a set down and through the final ten-point deciding set tiebreak to reach the semifinals. Together with Thanasi Kokkinakis and Nick Kyrgios, Ebden and Purcell made it the most Australians to reach this stage of the men's doubles tournament in 29 years, since 1993, and the first time since 1985 that two all-Australian pairings contested the semifinals. Their quarterfinals win set them up for a match against second seeds Rajeev Ram and Joe Salisbury, where they saved four set points in the second set to defeat the pair in straight sets to reach the final. Purcell and Ebden faced Kokkinakis and Kyrgios in the final, the first in men's doubles at the Australian Open to feature two all-Australian teams since 1980, where they ultimately lost in straight sets.

Purcell made his debut at the 2022 Wimbledon Championships in singles after qualifying for the main draw for the first time. In the main draw, he lost to Adrian Mannarino in the first round in five sets.

Seeded 14th in the doubles event, Purcell and Ebden reached their second major final, defeating third seeds Wesley Koolhof and Neal Skupski in the round of 16, avenging their loss in the final of the 2022 Libéma Open earlier in the grass season, seventh seeds Filip Polasek and John Peers in the quarterfinals and top seeds Joe Salisbury and Rajeev Ram on their way. In the semifinal matchup against Sailsbury and Ram, Purcell and Ebden played in a five sets close to four hours epic match, saving five match points, to reach their second Major final. They went on to win their maiden Grand Slam title as a team defeating second seeded pair of Nikola Mektic and Mate Pavic in another more than four hours, five set classic with a super tiebreak.

At the 2022 Hall of Fame Open he reached the second round in singles defeating Adrian Mannarino before losing to Andy Murray. At the same tournament he reached the quarterfinals partnering Tim van Rijthoven where they lost to eventual champions William Blumberg and Steve Johnson. At the 2022 Los Cabos Open he qualified for the main draw and defeated Henri Laaksonen before losing to 6th seed Brandon Nakashima. At the same tournament in doubles seeded second with Ebden, they reached also the second round.

At the US Open, Purcell failed to qualify for the singles event. In the doubles, Purcell and Ebden were eliminated in the third round by second seeded pair Wesley Koolhof and Neal Skupski.

=== 2023: ATP 1000 quarterfinal, Australian No. 2 ===
Despite a successful 2022 doubles campaign, which included two Grand Slam finals and a title, Purcell decided to split from partner Matthew Ebden for the 2023 season, citing a desire to focus on his singles career.

Purcell qualified for the second time at the 2023 Australian Open in singles, but was eliminated in the first round of the main draw after a four set loss against Emil Ruusuvuori. Purcell partnered fellow Australian Jordan Thompson in the doubles event, but was eliminated in the second round by eventual finalists Hugo Nys and Jan Zielinski.

Ranked No. 203, he reached the top 155 in singles following his second Challenger title in Chennai. He moved another 40 positions up to No. 116 on 27 February 2023 after winning back-to-back titles at the 2023 Bengaluru Open Challenger. He moved another 20 positions up to reach the top 100 after his third Challenger title in a month in Pune to No. 95 on 6 March 2023. He reached No. 86 in the singles rankings after a final showing at the 2023 Play In Challenger in Lille on 3 April 2023. At the same tournament he won the doubles title partnering with Jason Taylor.

As the defending champion in doubles, he won his third ATP title and second on clay in Houston with Jordan Thompson. At the same tournament he also made the second round in singles.

In May, Purcell reached his sixth Challenger of the season at the 2023 Busan Open in South Korea, where he lost to compatriot seed Aleksandar Vukic after retirement due to right ankle injury. As a result he moved close to 20 positions up into the top 70. He also had to give a walkover in the doubles final. It was his fifth doubles final of the year, all of which have been with different partners. At the 2023 French Open he recorded his first Grand Slam win over compatriot Jordan Thompson.

At the 2023 Western & Southern Open he reached the round of 16 as a qualifier, defeating fifth seed Casper Ruud for his first top 10 win. Next he defeated Stan Wawrinka to reach his first Masters quarterfinal. As a result he reached the top 50 in the singles rankings on 21 August 2023. Following the US Open, ranked No. 43, he became the Australian No. 2. He further reached the top 40 on 16 October 2023.

He won his fourth doubles title at the 2023 Japan Open Tennis Championships with Rinky Hijikata.

=== 2024: ATP 250 final, US Open doubles title ===
Purcell started his year at the Brisbane International, where he drew top seed Holger Rune and lost in three sets. Next, at the Australian Open, Purcell won his first match, beating Máté Valkusz in four sets. He lost to 11th seed Casper Ruud in the second round. At the 2024 Dallas Open he won his fifth doubles title with Jordan Thompson. At the 2024 Los Cabos Open he won his sixth title also with Thompson. In April, as defending champions, the pair Purcell and Thompson won their fourth title as a team at the 2024 U.S. Men's Clay Court Championships.

He reached his maiden singles ATP final at the 2024 Eastbourne International as a qualifier. Purcell was competing in just his second ATP semifinal, becoming only the fourth qualifier in tournament history to advance to the final. As a result he returned to the top 70 climbing back up more than 25 positions in the rankings.

Partnering Jordan Thompson, he reached his second final at the 2024 Wimbledon Championships. As a result he moved into the top 20 in the doubles rankings on 15 July 2024. They were defeated in the final by first time Major champions Henry Patten and Harri Heliovaara in a three-setter with three tiebreaks, after Purcell/Thompson failed to convert three match points in the second set.

With Thompson, he reached a second Grand Slam final in doubles for the season at the US Open, defeating American duo and 13th seeds Nathaniel Lammons and Jackson Withrow. They defeated tenth seeds Kevin Krawietz and Tim Pütz lifting their first Grand Slam trophy as a team, and the first at this level for Thompson and second for Purcell.

== Anti-doping suspension ==
On 23 December 2024, it was announced that Purcell had been given a provisional suspension by the International Tennis Integrity Agency effective from 12 December, after he admitted violating Article 2.2 of the Tennis Anti-Doping Program “relating to the use of a Prohibited Method.” Writing on Instagram, Purcell said he had "unknowingly received" an intravenous infusion of vitamins which was above the 100ml limit allowed under World Anti-Doping Agency rules. In April 2025, Purcell accepted an 18-month suspension which, taking into account time already served, will end on 11 June 2026.

== Performance timelines ==
Key
W	F	SF	QF	#R	RR	Q#	DNQ	A	NH

(W) winner; (F) finalist; (SF) semifinalist; (QF) quarterfinalist; (#R) rounds 4, 3, 2, 1; (RR) round-robin stage; (Q#) qualification round; (DNQ) did not qualify; (A) absent; (NH) not held; (SR) strike rate (events won / competed); (W–L) win–loss record.
To avoid confusion and double counting, these charts are updated at the conclusion of a tournament or when the player's participation has ended.

=== Singles ===
Current after the 2024 ATP Finals.

Tournament	2017	2018	2019	2020	2021	2022	2023	2024	SR	W–L
Grand Slam tournaments
Australian Open	Q1	Q1	Q1	1R	Q2	Q2	1R	~~2R~~ (Note: While Purcell did reach the second round of the 2024 Australian Open, this result, including ranking points and prize money, was rescinded following a suspension for a doping violation in December 2023.)	0 / 2	0–2
French Open	A	A	A	Q2	A	Q1	2R	1R	0 / 2	1–2
Wimbledon	A	Q1	A	NH	A	1R	1R	1R	0 / 3	0–3
US Open	A	Q1	Q2	A	1R	Q2	1R	2R	0 / 3	1–3
Win–loss	0–0	0–0	0–0	0–1	0–1	0–1	1–4	1–3	0 / 10	2–10
National representation
Summer Olympics	NH				2R	NH		A	0 / 1	1–1
Davis Cup	A	A	A	A	A	F	F	SF	0 / 3	0–2
ATP Tour Masters 1000
Indian Wells Masters	A	A	A	NH	A	Q1	A	1R	0 / 1	0–1
Miami Open	A	A	A	NH	A	Q1	A	1R	0 / 1	0–1
Monte-Carlo Masters	A	A	A	NH	A	A	A	A	0 / 0	0–0
Madrid Open	A	A	A	NH	A	A	A	2R	0 / 1	1–1
Italian Open	A	A	A	A	A	A	A	A	0 / 0	0–0
Canadian Open	A	A	A	NH	Q1	Q1	2R	1R	0 / 2	1–2
Cincinnati Masters	A	A	A	A	A	A	QF	2R	0 / 2	4–2
Shanghai Masters	A	A	A	NH			1R	A	0 / 1	0–1
Paris Masters	A	A	A	A	A	A	1R	A	0 / 1	0–1
Win–loss	0–0	0–0	0–0	0–0	0–0	0–0	4–4	2–5	0 / 9	6–9
Career statistics
Overall win–loss	0–0	0–1	0–0	0–1	6–5	2–6	10–20	14–20	32–53	
Year-end ranking	277	280	221	239	176	220	45	103	38%	

=== Doubles ===
Current after the 2024 ATP Finals.

Tournament	2017	2018	2019	2020	2021	2022	2023	2024	SR	W–L
Grand Slam tournaments
Australian Open	1R	2R	1R	F	2R	F	2R	~~2R~~ (Note: While Purcell did reach the second round of the 2024 Australian Open, this result, including ranking points and prize money, was rescinded following a suspension for a doping violation in December 2023.)	0 / 7	13–7
French Open	A	A	A	1R	3R	1R	2R	3R	0 / 5	5–5
Wimbledon	A	A	1R	NH	3R	W	3R	F	1 / 5	15–4
US Open	A	A	A	1R	QF	3R	1R	W	1 / 5	11–4
Win–loss	0–1	1–1	0–2	5–3	8–4	13–3	4–4	13–2	2 / 22	44–20
Year-end championships
ATP Finals	DNQ			Alt	DNQ	Alt	DNQ	SF	0 / 1	2–2
National representation
Summer Olympics	NH				1R	NH		A	0 / 1	0–1
Davis Cup	A	A	A	A	A	F	F	SF	0 / 3	9–2
ATP Tour Masters 1000
Indian Wells Masters	A	A	A	NH	A	A	A	1R	0 / 1	0–1
Miami Open	A	A	A	NH	A	2R	A	2R	0 / 2	2–2
Monte-Carlo Masters	A	A	A	NH	A	A	A	A	0 / 0	0–0
Madrid Open	A	A	A	NH	2R	A	A	A	0 / 1	1–1
Italian Open	A	A	A	QF	1R	2R	A	A	0 / 3	3–3
Canadian Open	A	A	A	NH	1R	1R	QF	2R	0 / 4	3–4
Cincinnati Masters	A	A	A	1R	A	1R	2R	2R	0 / 4	2–3
Shanghai Masters	A	A	A	NH			2R	A	0 / 1	1–1
Paris Masters	A	A	A	1R	A	A	A	SF	0 / 2	2–2
Win–loss	0–0	0–0	0–0	2–3	1–3	2–4	4–3	5–4	0 / 18	14–17
Career statistics
Titles	0	0	0	0	0	2	2	4	8	
Finals	0	0	0	2	0	4	4	5	15	
Overall win–loss	0–1	1–1	0–4	13–12	13–13	30–16	30–12	44–12	131–71	
Year-end ranking	226	128	88	38	33	33	35	12	65%	

== Significant finals ==
=== Grand Slam tournament finals ===
==== Doubles: 5 (2 titles, 3 runner-ups) ====
Result	Year	Championship	Surface	Partner	Opponents	Score
Loss	2020	Australian Open	Hard	(Australia) Luke Saville	(United States) Rajeev Ram (United Kingdom) Joe Salisbury	4–6, 2–6
Loss	2022	Australian Open	Hard	(Australia) Matthew Ebden	(Australia) Thanasi Kokkinakis (Australia) Nick Kyrgios	5–7, 4–6
Win	2022	Wimbledon	Grass	(Australia) Matthew Ebden	(Croatia) Nikola Mektić (Croatia) Mate Pavić	7–6^{(7–5)}, 6–7^{(3–7)}, 4–6, 6–4, 7–6^{(10–2)}
Loss	2024	Wimbledon	Grass	(Australia) Jordan Thompson	(Finland) Harri Heliövaara (United Kingdom) Henry Patten	7–6^{(9–7)}, 6–7^{(8–10)}, 6–7^{(9–11)}
Win	2024	US Open	Hard	(Australia) Jordan Thompson	(Germany) Kevin Krawietz (Germany) Tim Pütz	6–4, 7–6^{(7–4)}

== ATP Tour career finals ==
=== Singles: 1 (1 runner-up) ===
Legend Grand Slam tournaments (0–0) ATP Finals (0–0) ATP Masters 1000 (0–0) ATP 500 (0–0) ATP 250 (0–1)	Finals by surface Hard (0–0) Clay (0–0) Grass (0–1)	Finals by setting Outdoor (0–1) Indoor (0–0)

Result	W–L	Date	Tournament	Tier	Surface	Opponent	Score
Loss	0–1	Jun 2024	Eastbourne International, United Kingdom	ATP 250	Grass	(United States) Taylor Fritz	4–6, 3–6

=== Doubles: 15 (8 titles, 7 runner-ups) ===
Legend Grand Slam tournaments (2–3) ATP Finals (0–0) ATP Masters 1000 (0–0) ATP 500 (1–0) ATP 250 (5–4)	Finals by surface Hard (4–4) Clay (3–0) Grass (1–3)	Finals by setting Outdoor (7–6) Indoor (1–1)

Result	W–L	Date	Tournament	Tier	Surface	Partner	Opponents	Score
Loss	0–1	Feb 2020	Australian Open, Australia	Grand Slam	Hard	(Australia) Luke Saville	(United States) Rajeev Ram (United Kingdom) Joe Salisbury	4–6, 2–6
Loss	0–2	Nov 2020	Astana Open, Kazakhstan	ATP 250	Hard (i)	(Australia) Luke Saville	(Belgium) Sander Gillé (Belgium) Joran Vliegen	5–7, 3–6
Loss	0–3	Jan 2022	Australian Open, Australia	Grand Slam	Hard	(Australia) Matthew Ebden	(Australia) Thanasi Kokkinakis (Australia) Nick Kyrgios	5–7, 4–6
Win	1–3	Apr 2022	U.S. Men's Clay Court Championships, United States	ATP 250	Clay	(Australia) Matthew Ebden	(Serbia) Ivan Sabanov (Serbia) Matej Sabanov	6–3, 6–3
Loss	1–4	Jun 2022	Rosmalen Championships, Netherlands	ATP 250	Grass	(Australia) Matthew Ebden	(Netherlands) Wesley Koolhof (United Kingdom) Neal Skupski	6–4, 5–7, [6–10]
Win	2–4	Jul 2022	Wimbledon, United Kingdom	Grand Slam	Grass	(Australia) Matthew Ebden	(Croatia) Nikola Mektić (Croatia) Mate Pavić	7–6^{(7–5)}, 6–7^{(3–7)}, 4–6, 6–4, 7–6^{(10–2)}
Win	3–4	Apr 2023	U.S. Men's Clay Court Championships, United States (2)	ATP 250	Clay	(Australia) Jordan Thompson	(United Kingdom) Julian Cash (United Kingdom) Henry Patten	4–6, 6–4, [10–5]
Loss	3–5	Jul 2023	Hall of Fame Open, United States	ATP 250	Grass	(United States) William Blumberg	(United States) Nathaniel Lammons (United States) Jackson Withrow	3–6, 7–5, [5–10]
Loss	3–6	Jul 2023	Atlanta Open, United States	ATP 250	Hard	(Australia) Jordan Thompson	(United States) Nathaniel Lammons (United States) Jackson Withrow	6–7^{(3–7)}, 6–7^{(4–7)}
Win	4–6	Oct 2023	Japan Open, Japan	ATP 500	Hard	(Australia) Rinky Hijikata	(United Kingdom) Jamie Murray (New Zealand) Michael Venus	6–4, 6–1
Win	5–6	Feb 2024	Dallas Open, United States	ATP 250	Hard (i)	(Australia) Jordan Thompson	(United States) William Blumberg (Australia) Rinky Hijikata	6–4, 2–6, [10–8]
Win	6–6	Feb 2024	Los Cabos Open, Mexico	ATP 250	Hard	(Australia) Jordan Thompson	(Ecuador) Gonzalo Escobar (Kazakhstan) Aleksandr Nedovyesov	7–5, 7–6^{(7–2)}
Win	7–6	Apr 2024	U.S. Men's Clay Court Championships, United States (3)	ATP 250	Clay	(Australia) Jordan Thompson	(United States) William Blumberg (Australia) John Peers	7–5, 6–1
Loss	7–7	Jul 2024	Wimbledon, United Kingdom	Grand Slam	Grass	(Australia) Jordan Thompson	(Finland) Harri Heliövaara (United Kingdom) Henry Patten	7–6^{(9–7)}, 6–7^{(8–10)}, 6–7^{(9–11)}
Win	8–7	Sep 2024	US Open, United States	Grand Slam	Hard	(Australia) Jordan Thompson	(Germany) Kevin Krawietz (Germany) Tim Pütz	6–4, 7–6^{(7–4)}

== Team competition finals ==
=== Davis Cup: 2 (2 runner-ups) ===
Result	Date	Tournament	Surface	Partners	Opponents	Score
Loss	Nov 2022	Davis Cup, Málaga, Spain	Hard (i)	(Australia) Alex de Minaur (Australia) Jordan Thompson (Australia) Thanasi Kokkinakis (Australia) Matthew Ebden	(Canada) Félix Auger-Aliassime (Canada) Denis Shapovalov (Canada) Vasek Pospisil (Canada) Alexis Galarneau (Canada) Gabriel Diallo	0–2
Loss	Nov 2023	Davis Cup, Málaga, Spain	Hard (i)	(Australia) Alex de Minaur (Australia) Alexei Popyrin (Australia) Jordan Thompson (Australia) Matthew Ebden	(Italy) Jannik Sinner (Italy) Lorenzo Musetti (Italy) Matteo Arnaldi (Italy) Lorenzo Sonego (Italy) Simone Bolelli	0–2

== ATP Challenger and ITF World Tour finals ==
=== Singles: 18 (10 titles, 8 runner-ups) ===
Legend ATP Challenger Tour (5–5) ITF Futures/WTT (5–3)	Finals by surface Hard (9–7) Clay (1–1) Grass (0–0) Carpet (0–0)

Result	W–L	Date	Tournament	Tier	Surface	Opponent	Score
Win	1–0	May 2016	Gimcheon, South Korea	Challenger	Hard	(Australia) Andrew Whittington	3–6, 7–6^{(8–6)}, 5–1 ret.
Loss	1–1	Nov 2016	Australia F10, Blacktown	Futures	Hard	(Australia) Christopher O'Connell	2–6, 2–6
Win	2–1	Mar 2017	Japan F2, Nishitōkyō	Futures	Hard	(Japan) Yusuke Takahashi	7–5, 7–6^{(10–8)}
Loss	2–2	Apr 2017	Indonesia F6, Jakarta	Futures	Hard	(Chinese Taipei) Chen Ti	3–6, 4–6
Win	3–2	Oct 2017	Thailand F8, Nonthaburi	Futures	Hard	(Latvia) Martins Podzus	6–7^{(7–9)}, 6–2, 7–6^{(7–4)}
Win	4–2	Oct 2017	Thailand F9, Pattaya	Futures	Hard (i)	(Chinese Taipei) Wu Tung-lin	6–2, 6–2
Loss	4–3	Mar 2018	Australia F3, Mornington	Futures	Clay	(Australia) Marc Polmans	6–7^{(5–7)}, 2–6
Win	5–3	Apr 2018	Australia F4, Mornington	Futures	Clay	(Australia) Marc Polmans	7–5, 6–4
Loss	5–4	May 2019	Seoul, South Korea	Challenger	Hard	(South Korea) Kwon Soon-woo	5–7, 5–7
Win	6–4	Jul 2021	Nur-Sultan, Kazakhstan	Challenger	Hard	(United Kingdom) Jay Clarke	3–6, 6–4, 7–6^{(8–6)}
Loss	6–5	Sep 2021	Columbus, United States	Challenger	Hard	(United States) Stefan Kozlov	6–4, 2–6, 4–6
Win	7–5	Feb 2023	Chennai, India	Challenger	Hard	(United States) Nicolas Moreno de Alboran	5–7, 7–6^{(7–2)}, 6–4
Win	8–5	Feb 2023	Bangalore, India	Challenger	Hard	(Australia) James Duckworth	3–6, 7–5, 7–6^{(7–5)}
Win	9–5	Mar 2023	Pune, India	Challenger	Hard	(Italy) Luca Nardi	6–2, 6–3
Loss	9–6	Mar 2023	Lille, France	Challenger	Hard (i)	(Finland) Otto Virtanen	7–6^{(7–3)}, 4–6, 2–6
Loss	9–7	May 2023	Gwangju, South Korea	Challenger	Hard	(Australia) Jordan Thompson	3–6, 2–6
Loss	9–8	May 2023	Busan, South Korea	Challenger	Hard	(Australia) Aleksandar Vukic	4–6, 0–1 ret.
Win	10–8	Jun 2026	M15 Wuning, China	WTT	Hard	(Australia) Matthew Dellavedova	6–0, 6–1

=== Doubles: 26 (18 titles, 8 runner-ups) ===
Legend ATP Challenger Tour (15–6) ITF Futures/WTT (3–2)	Finals by surface Hard (18–7) Clay (0–1) Grass (0–0) Carpet (0–0)

Result	W–L	Date	Tournament	Tier	Surface	Partner	Opponents	Score
Loss	0–1	Oct 2015	Australia F8, Toowoomba	Futures	Hard	(Australia) Jake Delaney	(Australia) Steven de Waard (Australia) Marc Polmans	4–6, 3–6
Win	1–1	Aug 2017	Lexington, USA	Challenger	Hard	(Australia) Alex Bolt	(France) Tom Jomby (United States) Eric Quigley	7–5, 6–4
Win	2–1	Oct 2017	Thailand F9, Pattaya	Futures	Hard (i)	(Chinese Taipei) Chen Ti	(Hong Kong) Skyler Butts (China) Li Yuanfeng	6–1, 6–1
Win	3–1	Nov 2017	Toyota, Japan	Challenger	Hard (i)	(Australia) Andrew Whittington	(Philippines) Ruben Gonzales (Indonesia) Christopher Rungkat	6–3, 2–6, [10–8]
Loss	3–2	Mar 2018	Australia F3, Mornington	Futures	Clay	(Australia) Tom Evans	(Chinese Taipei) Hsu Yu-hsiou (Australia) Matthew Romios	3–6, 3–6
Loss	3–3	Aug 2018	Vancouver, Canada	Challenger	Hard	(Australia) Marc Polmans	(United Kingdom) Luke Bambridge (United Kingdom) Neal Skupski	6–4, 3–6, [6–10]
Loss	3–4	Oct 2018	Traralgon, Australia	Challenger	Hard	(Australia) Luke Saville	(Australia) Jeremy Beale (Australia) Marc Polmans	2–6, 4–6
Win	4–4	Nov 2018	Bangalore, India	Challenger	Hard	(Australia) Luke Saville	(India) Purav Raja (Croatia) Antonio Šančić	7–6^{(7–3)}, 6–3
Win	5–4	Jan 2019	Playford, Australia	Challenger	Hard	(Australia) Luke Saville	(Uruguay) Ariel Behar (Spain) Enrique López Pérez	6–4, 7–5
Win	6–4	Feb 2019	Launceston, Australia	Challenger	Hard	(Australia) Luke Saville	(Japan) Hiroki Moriya (Egypt) Mohamed Safwat	7–5, 6–4
Loss	6–5	Mar 2019	Yokohama, Japan	Challenger	Hard	(Australia) Luke Saville	(Tunisia) Moez Echargui (Tunisia) Skander Mansouri	6–7^{(6–8)}, 7–6^{(7–3)}, [7–10]
Loss	6–6	Mar 2019	Zhuhai, China, P.R.	Challenger	Hard	(Australia) Luke Saville	(China) Gong Maoxin (China) Zhang Ze	4–6, 4–6
Win	7–6	Mar 2019	Zhangjiagang, China, P.R.	Challenger	Hard	(Australia) Luke Saville	(Mexico) Hans Hach (India) Sriram Balaji	6–2, 7–6^{(7–5)}
Win	8–6	Apr 2019	Anning, China, P.R.	Challenger	Hard	(Australia) Luke Saville	(Netherlands) David Pel (Chile) Hans Podlipnik Castillo	4–6, 7–5, [10–5]
Win	9–6	May 2019	Seoul, South Korea	Challenger	Hard	(Australia) Luke Saville	(Belgium) Ruben Bemelmans (Ukraine) Sergiy Stakhovsky	6–4, 7–6^{(9–7)}
Win	10–6	Jul 2019	Binghamton, United States	Challenger	Hard	(Australia) Luke Saville	(United States) Alex Lawson (United States) JC Aragone	6–4, 4–6, [10–5]
Win	11–6	Oct 2019	Traralgon, Australia	Challenger	Hard	(Australia) Luke Saville	(United Kingdom) Brydan Klein (Australia) Scott Puodziunas	6–7^{(2–7)}, 6–3, [10–4]
Win	12–6	Jan 2020	Bendigo, Australia	Challenger	Hard	(Australia) Luke Saville	(Israel) Jonathan Erlich (Belarus) Andrei Vasilevski	7–6^{(7–3)}, 7–6^{(7–3)}
Win	13–6	Oct 2022	Busan, South Korea	Challenger	Hard	(Australia) Marc Polmans	(South Korea) Nam Ji-sung (South Korea) Song Min-kyu	6–7^{(5–7)}, 6–2, [12–10]
Win	14–6	Feb 2023	Burnie, Australia	Challenger	Hard	(Australia) Marc Polmans	(Australia) Luke Saville (Australia) Tristan Schoolkate	7–6^{(7–4)}, 6–4
Win	15–6	Mar 2023	Lille, France	Challenger	Hard (i)	(Australia) Jason Taylor	(Jamaica) Dustin Brown (Pakistan) Aisam-ul-Haq Qureshi	7–6^{(7–3)}, 6–4
Win	16–6	Apr 2023	Seoul, South Korea	Challenger	Hard	(Japan) Yasutaka Uchiyama	(South Korea) Chung Yun-seong (Japan) Yuta Shimizu	6–1, 6–4
Loss	16–7	May 2023	Busan, South Korea (2)	Challenger	Hard	(New Zealand) Rubin Statham	(United States) Evan King (United States) Reese Stalder	w/o
Win	17–7	Jun 2026	M15 Tokyo, Japan	WTT	Hard	(Japan) Yusuke Kusuhara	(Australia) Jake Delaney (Japan) Shunsuke Nakagawa	6–7^{(3–7)}, 6–3, [11–9]
Win	18–7	Jun 2026	M15 Wuning, China	WTT	Hard	(China) Zhao Zhao	(Philippines) Francis Alcantara (Chinese Taipei) Hsieh Cheng-peng	6–7^{(6–8)}, 6–3, [10–5]
Loss	18–8	Aug 2026	Kingston, Jamaica	Challenger	Hard	(Slovenia) Blaž Kavčič	(France) Arthur Reymond (France) Luca Sanchez	4–6, 6–2, [10–12]

== National representation ==
All Davis Cup matches: 9–4 (Singles: 0–2, Doubles: 9–2)
Round	Date	Opponents	Tie score	Venue	Surface	Match	Opponent(s)	Rubber score
2022 Davis Cup Finals
RR	13 Sep 2022	Belgium	3–0	Hamburg	Hard (i)	Doubles (with Matthew Ebden)	Sander Gillé & Joran Vliegen	6–1, 6–3
RR	15 Sep 2022	France	2–1	Hamburg	Hard (i)	Doubles (with Matthew Ebden)	Nicolas Mahut & Arthur Rinderknech	6–4, 6–4
RR	18 Sep 2022	Germany	1–2	Hamburg	Hard (i)	Singles 1	Jan-Lennard Struff	1–6, 5–7
RR	18 Sep 2022	Germany	1–2	Hamburg	Hard (i)	Doubles (with Matthew Ebden)	Kevin Krawietz & Tim Pütz	4–6, 4–6
SF	25 Nov 2022	Croatia	2–1	Málaga	Hard (i)	Doubles (with Jordan Thompson)	Nikola Mektić & Mate Pavić	6–7, 7–5, 6–4
2023 Davis Cup Finals
RR	13 Sep 2023	Great Britain	2–1	Manchester	Hard (i)	Doubles (with Matthew Ebden)	Dan Evans & Neal Skupski	7–6^{(7–5)}, 6–4
RR	14 Sep 2023	France	2–1	Manchester	Hard (i)	Singles 1	Adrian Mannarino	6–7^{(4–7)}, 4–6
RR	14 Sep 2023	France	2–1	Manchester	Hard (i)	Doubles (with Matthew Ebden)	Nicolas Mahut & Édouard Roger-Vasselin	7–5, 6–3
RR	16 Sep 2023	Switzerland	3–0	Manchester	Hard (i)	Doubles (with Matthew Ebden)	Marc-Andrea Hüsler & Dominic Stricker	6–2, 6–4
QF	22 Nov 2023	Czech Republic	2–1	Málaga	Hard (i)	Doubles (with Matthew Ebden)	Jiří Lehečka & Adam Pavlásek	6–4, 7–5
2024 Davis Cup Finals
RR	10 Sep 2024	France	2–1	Valencia	Hard (i)	Doubles (with Matthew Ebden)	Pierre-Hugues Herbert & Édouard Roger-Vasselin	7–5, 5–7, 6–3
RR	12 Sep 2024	Czech Republic	3–0	Valencia	Hard (i)	Doubles (with Matthew Ebden)	Jakub Menšík & Adam Pavlásek	6–4, 6–2
RR	15 Sep 2024	Spain	1–2	Valencia	Hard (i)	Doubles (with Matthew Ebden)	Marcel Granollers & Pedro Martínez	7–5, 4–6, 4–6

== Record against top 10 players ==
Purcell's record against players who have been ranked in the top 10, with those who are active in boldface. Only ATP Tour main draw matches are considered:

Player	Record	Win %	Hard	Clay	Grass	Last match
Number 1 ranked players						
(Italy) **Jannik Sinner**	0–3	0%	0–3	–	–	Lost (1–6, 3–6) at 2022 ATP Cup
(Spain) **Carlos Alcaraz**	0–1	0%	0–1	–	–	Lost (6–4, 3–6, 4–6) at 2023 Cincinnati
(United Kingdom) **Andy Murray**	0–2	0%	0–1	–	0–1	Lost (6–7^{(2–7)}, 6–3, 5–7) at 2023 Toronto
Number 2 ranked players						
(Norway) **Casper Ruud**	1–0	100%	1–0	–	–	Won (6–4, 3–6, 6–4) at 2023 Cincinnati
Number 3 ranked players						
(Switzerland) **Stan Wawrinka**	1–0	100%	1–0	–	–	Won (6–4, 6–2) at 2023 Cincinnati
Number 4 ranked players						
(United States) **Taylor Fritz**	0–1	0%	0–1	–	–	Lost (6–7^{(7–9)}, 6–7^{(4–7)}) at 2023 Basel
(Denmark) **Holger Rune**	0–1	0%	0–1	–	–	Lost (6–4, 4–6, 2–6) at 2024 Brisbane
Number 5 ranked players						
(Russia) **Andrey Rublev**	0–1	0%	–	–	0–1	Lost (3–6, 5–7, 4–6) at 2023 Wimbledon
Number 6 ranked players						
(Canada) **Félix Auger-Aliassime**	2–0	100%	2–0	–	–	Won (6–4, 6–4) at 2023 Toronto
(France) **Gaël Monfils**	1–0	100%	–	–	1–0	Won (6–4, 5–7, 6–4) at 2021 Eastbourne
Number 8 ranked players						
(Russia) **Karen Khachanov**	0–1	0%	0–1	–	–	Lost (6–7^{(5–7)}, 3–6) at 2021 Melbourne
**Total**	**5–10**	**33%**	**4–8** **(33%)**	**0–0** **( – )**	**1–2** **(33%)**	*** Statistics correct as of 1 January 2024**

== Wins over top 10 players ==
- Purcell has a 1–2 record against players who were, at the time the match was played, ranked in the top 10.

Season	2016–22	2023	Total
Wins	0	1	1

#	Player	Rank	Event	Surface	Rd	Score	MPR
2023
1.	(Norway) Casper Ruud	7	Cincinnati, United States	Hard	2R	6–4, 3–6, 6–4	70
