= Bengaluru Open =

- 2026 Bengaluru Open

ATP Challenger Tour
- Event name: Dafa News Bengaluru Open
- Location: Bangalore, India
- Venue: Karnataka State Lawn Tennis Association
- Category: ATP Challenger Tour
- Surface: Hard
- Draw: 32S/32Q/16D
- Prize money: $225,000 (2026)
- Website: bengaluruopen.com

Current champions (2025)
- Singles: (United States) Brandon Holt
- Doubles: (India) Anirudh Chandrasekar (Chinese Taipei) Ray Ho

The Dafa News Bengaluru Open is a professional tennis tournament played on hardcourts. It is currently part of the ATP Challenger Tour. It is held annually in Bangalore, India since 2015 with a break in 2021 due to the COVID-19 pandemic. In 2025 it was upgraded to an ATP Challenger 125 event.

== Past finals ==
=== Singles ===
Year	Champion	Runner-up	Score
2026 (3)	Petr Bar Biryukov	Ilya Ivashka	7–6^{(7–0)}, 4–6, 6–4
2026 (2)	(United States) Keegan Smith	(Australia) Philip Sekulic	6–2, 7–5
2026 (1)	(Spain) Pedro Martínez	(Kazakhstan) Timofey Skatov	7–6^{(7–5)}, 6–3
2025	(United States) Brandon Holt	(Japan) Shintaro Mochizuki	6–3, 6–3
2024	(Italy) Stefano Napolitano	(South Korea) Hong Seong-chan	4–6, 6–3, 6–3
2023	(Australia) Max Purcell	(Australia) James Duckworth	3–6, 7–5, 7–6^{(7–5)}
2022 (2)	(Australia) Aleksandar Vukic	(Bulgaria) Dimitar Kuzmanov	6–4, 6–4
2022 (1)	(Chinese Taipei) Tseng Chun-hsin	(Croatia) Borna Gojo	6–4, 7–5
2021	Not held		
2020	(Australia) James Duckworth	(France) Benjamin Bonzi	6–4, 6–4
2019	Not held		
2018	(India) Prajnesh Gunneswaran	(India) Saketh Myneni	6–2, 6–2
2017	(India) Sumit Nagal	(United Kingdom) Jay Clarke	6–3, 3–6, 6–2
2016	Not held		
2015	(United Kingdom) James Ward	(Spain) Adrián Menéndez Maceiras	6–2, 7–5

=== Doubles ===
Year	Champions	Runners-up	Score
2026 (3)	(India) Adil Kalyanpur (India) Mukund Sasikumar	Petr Bar Biryukov (Kazakhstan) Grigoriy Lomakin	6–7^{(3–7)}, 6–4, [10–3]
2026 (2)	(India) Niki Kaliyanda Poonacha (India) Saketh Myneni	Petr Bar Biryukov (Kazakhstan) Grigoriy Lomakin	6–2, 6–3
2026 (1)	(Colombia) Nicolás Barrientos (United States) Benjamin Kittay	(France) Arthur Reymond (France) Luca Sanchez	7–6^{(11–9)}, 7–5
2025	(India) Anirudh Chandrasekar (Chinese Taipei) Ray Ho	(Australia) Blake Bayldon (Australia) Matthew Romios	6–2, 6–4
2024	(India) Saketh Myneni (India) Ramkumar Ramanathan	(France) Constantin Bittoun Kouzmine (France) Maxime Janvier	6–3, 6–4
2023	(South Korea) Chung Yun-seong (Chinese Taipei) Hsu Yu-hsiou	(India) Anirudh Chandrasekar (India) Vijay Sundar Prashanth	3–6, 7–6^{(9–7)}, [11–9]
2022 (2)	(Austria) Alexander Erler (India) Arjun Kadhe	(India) Saketh Myneni (India) Ramkumar Ramanathan	6–3, 6–7^{(4–7)}, [10–7]
2022 (1)	(India) Saketh Myneni (2) (India) Ramkumar Ramanathan (2)	(France) Hugo Grenier (France) Alexandre Müller	6–3, 6–2
2021	Not held		
2020	(India) Purav Raja (India) Ramkumar Ramanathan	(Australia) Matthew Ebden (India) Leander Paes	6–0, 6–3
2019	Not held		
2018	(Australia) Max Purcell (Australia) Luke Saville	(India) Purav Raja (Croatia) Antonio Šančić	7–6^{(7–3)}, 6–3
2017	(Russia) Mikhail Elgin (India) Divij Sharan	(Croatia) Ivan Sabanov (Croatia) Matej Sabanov	6–3, 6–0
2016	Not held		
2015	(India) Saketh Myneni (India) Sanam Singh	(United States) John Paul Fruttero (India) Vijay Sundar Prashanth	5–7, 6–4, [10–2]
