= S D Prajwal Dev =

Indian tennis player (born 1996)

- Country (sports): India
- Born: 27 May 1996 (age 30) Mysore, India
- Height: 1.75 m (5 ft 9 in)
- Plays: Right-handed (two-handed backhand)
- Coach: Sujith Sachidanand
- Prize money: US $129,711

Singles
- Career record: 0–0
- Career titles: 0
- Highest ranking: No. 595 (12 February 2024)
- Current ranking: No. 693 (9 November 2026)

Doubles
- Career record: 0–0
- Career titles: 1 Challenger, 10 Futures
- Highest ranking: No. 180 (28 September 2026)
- Current ranking: No. 192 (9 November 2026)
- Last updated on: 9 November 2026.

S D Prajwal Dev (born 27 May 1996) is an Indian tennis player. Dev has a career high ATP doubles ranking of world No. 180 achieved on 28 September 2026 and a career high singles ranking of No. 595 achieved on 12 February 2024.

== Career ==
Dev has won one ATP Challenger doubles title at the 2023 President's Cup with Niki Kaliyanda Poonacha.
