= 2024 US Open – Day-by-day summaries =

Tennis tournament match results

The 2024 US Open described in detail, in the form of day-by-day summaries.

== Day 1 (August 26) ==
- Seeds out:
  - Men's Singles: (Denmark) Holger Rune [15], (Kazakhstan) Alexander Bublik [27]
  - Women's Singles: (Greece) Maria Sakkari [9], (Ukraine) Dayana Yastremska [32]
- Schedule of Play

Matches on main courts
Matches on Arthur Ashe Stadium
| Event | Winner | Loser | Score |
|---|---|---|---|
| Men's Singles 1st Round | (United States) Ben Shelton [13] | (Austria) Dominic Thiem [WC] | 6–4, 6–2, 6–2 |
| Women's Singles 1st Round | (United States) Coco Gauff [3] | (France) Varvara Gracheva | 6–2, 6–0 |
2024 US Open Opening Night Ceremony
| Women's Singles 1st Round | (France) Clara Burel | (United States) Sloane Stephens | 0–6, 7–5, 7–5 |
| Men's Singles 1st Round | (Serbia) Novak Djokovic [2] | (Moldova) Radu Albot [Q] | 6–2, 6–2, 6–4 |
Matches on Louis Armstrong Stadium
| Event | Winner | Loser | Score |
| Women's Singles 1st Round | (China) Zheng Qinwen [7] | (United States) Amanda Anisimova [WC] | 4–6, 6–4, 6–2 |
| Men's Singles 1st Round | (United States) Taylor Fritz [12] | (Argentina) Camilo Ugo Carabelli | 7–5, 6–1, 6–2 |
| Women's Singles 1st Round | (United States) Madison Keys [14] | (Czech Republic) Kateřina Siniaková | 6–4, 6–1 |
| Men's Singles 1st Round | (United States) Frances Tiafoe [20] | (United States) Aleksandar Kovacevic | 6–4, 6–3, 4–6, 7–5 |
| Women's Singles 1st Round | Aryna Sabalenka [2] | (Australia) Priscilla Hon [Q] | 6–3, 6–3 |
Matches on Grandstand
| Event | Winner | Loser | Score |
| Men's Singles 1st Round | (Germany) Alexander Zverev [4] | (Germany) Maximilian Marterer [LL] | 6–2, 6–7^{(5–7)}, 6–3, 6–2 |
| Women's Singles 1st Round | (Spain) Paula Badosa [26] | (Switzerland) Viktorija Golubic | 6–0, 6–3 |
| Men's Singles 1st Round | (France) Gaël Monfils | (Argentina) Diego Schwartzman [Q] | 6–7^{(2–7)}, 6–2, 6–2, 6–1 |
| Women's Singles 1st Round | Victoria Azarenka [20] | (Ukraine) Yuliia Starodubtseva [Q] | 3–6, 6–1, 6–1 |
Matches on Stadium 17
| Event | Winner | Loser | Score |
| Women's Singles 1st Round | (China) Wang Yafan | (Greece) Maria Sakkari [9] | 6–2, retired |
| Men's Singles 1st Round | (Norway) Casper Ruud [8] | (China) Bu Yunchaokete [Q] | 7–6^{(7–2)}, 6–2, 6–2 |
| Women's Singles 1st Round | (United States) Taylor Townsend | (Italy) Martina Trevisan | 6–2, 7–5 |
| Men's Singles 1st Round | (United States) Brandon Nakashima | (Denmark) Holger Rune [15] | 6–2, 6–1, 6–4 |
Colored background indicates a night match
Day matches began at 11am (12 pm Arthur Ashe Stadium), night matches began at 7pm Eastern Daylight Time (EDT)

== Day 2 (August 27) ==
- Seeds out:
  - Men's Singles: (Greece) Stefanos Tsitsipas [11], (Canada) Félix Auger-Aliassime [19], (Chile) Alejandro Tabilo [22], Karen Khachanov [23], (Chile) Nicolás Jarry [26]
  - Women's Singles: (Latvia) Jeļena Ostapenko [10], (United States) Danielle Collins [11], (Canada) Leylah Fernandez [23], (France) Caroline Garcia [28]
- Schedule of Play

Matches on main courts
Matches on Arthur Ashe Stadium
| Event | Winner | Loser | Score |
|---|---|---|---|
| Women's Singles 1st Round | (Poland) Iga Świątek [1] | Kamilla Rakhimova [LL] | 6–4, 7–6^{(8–6)} |
| Men's Singles 1st Round | (Italy) Jannik Sinner [1] | (United States) Mackenzie McDonald | 2–6, 6–2, 6–1, 6–2 |
| Men's Singles 1st Round | (Spain) Carlos Alcaraz [3] | (Australia) Li Tu [Q] | 6–2, 4–6, 6–3, 6–1 |
| Women's Singles 1st Round | (United States) Jessica Pegula [6] | (United States) Shelby Rogers [PR] | 6–4, 6–3 |
Matches on Louis Armstrong Stadium
| Event | Winner | Loser | Score |
| Women's Singles 1st Round | (United States) Caroline Dolehide | (United States) Danielle Collins [11] | 1–6, 7–5, 6–4 |
| Women's Singles 1st Round | (Japan) Naomi Osaka [WC] | (Latvia) Jeļena Ostapenko [10] | 6–3, 6–2 |
| Men's Singles 1st Round | Daniil Medvedev [5] | (Serbia) Dušan Lajović | 6–3, 3–6, 6–3, 6–1 |
| Women's Singles 1st Round | (Italy) Jasmine Paolini [5] | (Canada) Bianca Andreescu [WC] | 6–7^{(5–7)}, 6–2, 6–4 |
| Men's Singles 1st Round | (United States) Tommy Paul [14] | (Italy) Lorenzo Sonego | 6–4, 6–2, 5–7, 6–2 |
Matches on Grandstand
| Event | Winner | Loser | Score |
| Men's Singles 1st Round | (Australia) Thanasi Kokkinakis | (Greece) Stefanos Tsitsipas [11] | 7–6^{(7–5)}, 3–6, 6–3, 7–5 |
| Women's Singles 1st Round | (Kazakhstan) Elena Rybakina [4] | (Australia) Destanee Aiava [Q] | 6–1, 7–6^{(7–1)} |
| Men's Singles 1st Round | (United States) Sebastian Korda [16] | (France) Corentin Moutet | 7–6^{(7–3)}, 6–1, 6–0 |
| Women's Singles 1st Round | (United States) Sofia Kenin | (United Kingdom) Emma Raducanu | 6–1, 3–6, 6–4 |
Matches on Stadium 17
| Event | Winner | Loser | Score |
| Women's Singles 1st Round | (United Kingdom) Katie Boulter [31] | Aliaksandra Sasnovich [Q] | 5–7, 6–2, 6–1 |
| Women's Singles 1st Round | (Denmark) Caroline Wozniacki | (Japan) Nao Hibino [Q] | 6–0, 6–1 |
| Men's Singles 1st Round | (Australia) Alex de Minaur [10] | (United States) Marcos Giron | 6–3, 6–4, 5–7, 6–4 |
| Men's Singles 1st Round | (Italy) Mattia Bellucci [Q] | (Switzerland) Stan Wawrinka [WC] | 6–4, 7–6^{(7–5)}, 6–3 |
Colored background indicates a night match
Day matches began at 11am (12 pm Arthur Ashe Stadium), night matches began at 7pm Eastern Daylight Time (EDT)

== Day 3 (August 28) ==
- Seeds out:
  - Men's Singles: (France) Ugo Humbert [17], (Argentina) Sebastián Báez [21], (Argentina) Francisco Cerúndolo [29]
  - Women's Singles: (Czech Republic) Barbora Krejčíková [8], Daria Kasatkina [12]
  - Men's Doubles: (Mexico) Santiago González / (France) Édouard Roger-Vasselin [9]
  - Women's Doubles: (Spain) Cristina Bucșa / (China) Xu Yifan [14], (Norway) Ulrikke Eikeri / (Estonia) Ingrid Neel [15]
- Schedule of Play

Matches on main courts
Matches on Arthur Ashe Stadium
| Event | Winner | Loser | Score |
|---|---|---|---|
| Women's Singles 2nd Round | (United States) Madison Keys [14] | (Australia) Maya Joint [Q] | 6–4, 6–0 |
| Men's Singles 2nd Round | (United States) Frances Tiafoe [20] | (Kazakhstan) Alexander Shevchenko | 6–4, 6–1, 1–0, retired |
| Women's Doubles 1st Round (Note: This match was originally scheduled to play on Court 14 but was moved to Arthur Ashe Stadium after the conclusion of the Tiafoe-Shevchenko match.) | (Ukraine) Lyudmyla Kichenok [7] (Latvia) Jeļena Ostapenko [7] | (United States) Jessie Aney [WC] (United States) Jessica Failla [WC] | 6–3, 6–3 |
| Women's Singles 2nd Round | (United States) Coco Gauff [3] | (Germany) Tatjana Maria | 6–4, 6–0 |
| Men's Singles 2nd Round | (Serbia) Novak Djokovic [2] | (Serbia) Laslo Djere | 6–4, 6–4, 2–0, retired |
Matches on Louis Armstrong Stadium
| Event | Winner | Loser | Score |
| Women's Singles 2nd Round | (Spain) Paula Badosa [26] | (United States) Taylor Townsend | 6–3, 7–5 |
| Men's Singles 2nd Round | (Germany) Alexander Zverev [4] | (France) Alexandre Müller [WC] | 6–4, 7–6^{(7–5)}, 6–1 |
| Women's Singles 2nd Round | Aryna Sabalenka [2] | (Italy) Lucia Bronzetti | 6–3, 6–1 |
| Women's Singles 2nd Round | Victoria Azarenka [20] | (France) Clara Burel | 6–1, 6–4 |
| Men's Singles 2nd Round | (United States) Taylor Fritz [12] | (Italy) Matteo Berrettini | 6–3, 7–6^{(7–1)}, 6–1 |
Matches on Grandstand
| Event | Winner | Loser | Score |
| Women's Singles 2nd Round | (Romania) Elena-Gabriela Ruse [Q] | (Czech Republic) Barbora Krejčíková [8] | 6–4, 7–5 |
| Women's Singles 2nd Round | (China) Zheng Qinwen [7] | Erika Andreeva | 6–7^{(3–7)}, 6–1, 6–2 |
| Men's Singles 2nd Round | (United States) Ben Shelton [13] | (Spain) Roberto Bautista Agut | 6–3, 6–4, 6–4 |
| Men's Singles 2nd Round | (Norway) Casper Ruud [8] | (France) Gaël Monfils | 6–4, 6–2, 2–6, 7–6^{(7–3)} |
Matches on Stadium 17
| Event | Winner | Loser | Score |
| Men's Singles 2nd Round | (Bulgaria) Grigor Dimitrov [9] | (Australia) Rinky Hijikata | 6–1, 6–1, 7–6^{(7–4)} |
| Men's Singles 2nd Round | Andrey Rublev [6] | (France) Arthur Rinderknech | 4–6, 5–7, 6–1, 6–2, 6–2 |
| Women's Singles 2nd Round | (United States) Emma Navarro [13] | (Netherlands) Arantxa Rus | 6–1, 6–1 |
| Women's Singles 2nd Round | (Ukraine) Elina Svitolina [27] | (Ukraine) Anhelina Kalinina | 6–1, 6–2 |
Colored background indicates a night match
Day matches began at 11am (12 pm Arthur Ashe Stadium), night matches began at 7pm Eastern Daylight Time (EDT)

== Day 4 (August 29) ==
- Seeds out:
  - Men's Singles: (Spain) Carlos Alcaraz [3], (Poland) Hubert Hurkacz [7], (United States) Sebastian Korda [16], (France) Arthur Fils [24]
  - Women's Singles: (Kazakhstan) Elena Rybakina [4], Mirra Andreeva [21], (United Kingdom) Katie Boulter [31]
  - Women's Doubles: (Chinese Taipei) Hsieh Su-wei / (Belgium) Elise Mertens [2]
  - Mixed Doubles: (New Zealand) Erin Routliffe / (New Zealand) Michael Venus [2], (United States) Desirae Krawczyk / (United Kingdom) Neal Skupski [5], (United States) Nicole Melichar-Martinez / (Croatia) Ivan Dodig [6]
- Schedule of Play

Matches on main courts
Matches on Arthur Ashe Stadium
| Event | Winner | Loser | Score |
|---|---|---|---|
| Men's Singles 2nd Round | (Italy) Jannik Sinner [1] | (United States) Alex Michelsen | 6–4, 6–0, 6–2 |
| Women's Singles 2nd Round | (Poland) Iga Świątek [1] | (Japan) Ena Shibahara [Q] | 6–0, 6–1 |
| Women's Doubles 1st Round (Note: This match was originally scheduled to play on Court 6 but was moved to Arthur Ashe Stadium after the conclusion of the Świątek-Shibahara match.) | (Canada) Gabriela Dabrowski [1] (New Zealand) Erin Routliffe [1] | (Canada) Leylah Fernandez (Kazakhstan) Yulia Putintseva | 6–4, 6–2 |
| Women's Singles 2nd Round | (Czech Republic) Karolína Muchová | (Japan) Naomi Osaka [WC] | 6–3, 7–6^{(7–5)} |
| Men's Singles 2nd Round | (Netherlands) Botic van de Zandschulp | (Spain) Carlos Alcaraz [3] | 6–1, 7–5, 6–4 |
Matches on Louis Armstrong Stadium
| Event | Winner | Loser | Score |
| Men's Singles 2nd Round | (Czech Republic) Tomáš Macháč | (United States) Sebastian Korda [16] | 6–4, 6–2, 6–4 |
| Women's Singles 2nd Round | (Italy) Jasmine Paolini [5] | (Czech Republic) Karolína Plíšková | 0–0, retired |
| Women's Singles 2nd Round | (United States) Jessica Pegula [6] | (United States) Sofia Kenin | 7–6^{(7–4)}, 6–3 |
| Men's Singles 2nd Round | Daniil Medvedev [5] | (Hungary) Fábián Marozsán | 6–3, 6–2, 7–6^{(7–5)} |
| Women's Singles 2nd Round | (Denmark) Caroline Wozniacki | (Mexico) Renata Zarazúa | 6–3, 6–3 |
Matches on Grandstand
| Event | Winner | Loser | Score |
| Women's Singles 2nd Round | (Kazakhstan) Yulia Putintseva [30] | (China) Wang Xinyu | 6–1, 7–6^{(7–4)} |
| Women's Singles 2nd Round | (United States) Ashlyn Krueger | Mirra Andreeva [21] | 6–1, 6–4 |
| Men's Singles 2nd Round | (Australia) Alex de Minaur [10] | (Finland) Otto Virtanen [Q] | 7–5, 6–1, 7–6^{(7–3)} |
| Men's Singles 2nd Round | (United States) Tommy Paul [14] | (Australia) Max Purcell | 7–5, 6–0, 1–0, retired |
| Men's doubles 1st Round (Note: This match was originally scheduled to play on Court 5 but was moved to Grandstand after the conclusion of the Paul-Purcell match.) | (United States) Rajeev Ram [3] (United Kingdom) Joe Salisbury [3] | (Italy) Luciano Darderi [Alt] (Brazil) Fernando Romboli [Alt] | 6–7^{(9–11)}, 6–1, 7–5 |
Matches on Stadium 17
| Event | Winner | Loser | Score |
| Men's Singles 2nd Round | (Australia) Jordan Thompson | (Poland) Hubert Hurkacz [7] | 7–6^{(7–2)}, 6–1, 7–5 |
| Women's Singles 2nd Round | (Brazil) Beatriz Haddad Maia [22] | (Spain) Sara Sorribes Tormo | 6–2, 6–1 |
| Men's Singles 2nd Round | (Canada) Gabriel Diallo [Q] | (France) Arthur Fils [24] | 7–5, 6–7^{(3–7)}, 6–4, 6–4 |
| Women's Singles 2nd Round | (France) Jessika Ponchet [Q] | (Kazakhstan) Elena Rybakina [4] | Walkover |
Colored background indicates a night match
Day matches began at 11am (12 pm Arthur Ashe Stadium), night matches began at 7pm Eastern Daylight Time (EDT)

== Day 5 (August 30) ==
- Seeds out:
  - Men's Singles: (Serbia) Novak Djokovic [2], (United States) Ben Shelton [13], (Italy) Lorenzo Musetti [18], (Czech Republic) Jiří Lehečka [32]
  - Women's Singles: (United States) Madison Keys [14], (Ukraine) Marta Kostyuk [19], Victoria Azarenka [20], (Ukraine) Elina Svitolina [27], Ekaterina Alexandrova [29]
  - Men's Doubles: (Monaco) Hugo Nys / (Poland) Jan Zieliński [12], (United States) Austin Krajicek / (Netherlands) Jean-Julien Rojer [15]
  - Women's Doubles: (Italy) Sara Errani / (Italy) Jasmine Paolini [6]
  - Mixed Doubles: (Canada) Gabriela Dabrowski / (United Kingdom) Joe Salisbury [1]
- Schedule of Play

Matches on main courts
Matches on Arthur Ashe Stadium
| Event | Winner | Loser | Score |
|---|---|---|---|
| Women's Singles 3rd Round | (United States) Coco Gauff [3] | (Ukraine) Elina Svitolina [27] | 3–6, 6–3, 6–3 |
| Men's Singles 3rd Round | (United States) Frances Tiafoe [20] | (United States) Ben Shelton [13] | 4–6, 7–5, 6–7^{(5–7)}, 6–4, 6–3 |
| Men's Singles 3rd Round | (Australia) Alexei Popyrin [28] | (Serbia) Novak Djokovic [2] | 6–4, 6–4, 2–6, 6–4 |
| Women's Singles 3rd Round | Aryna Sabalenka [2] | Ekaterina Alexandrova [29] | 2–6, 6–1, 6–2 |
Matches on Louis Armstrong Stadium
| Event | Winner | Loser | Score |
| Women's Singles 3rd Round | (Spain) Paula Badosa [26] | (Romania) Elena-Gabriela Ruse [Q] | 4–6, 6–1, 7–6^{(10–8)} |
| Women's Singles 3rd Round | (United States) Emma Navarro [13] | (Ukraine) Marta Kostyuk [19] | 6–4, 4–6, 6–3 |
| Men's Singles 3rd Round | (United States) Taylor Fritz [12] | (Argentina) Francisco Comesaña | 6–3, 6–4, 6–2 |
| Women's Singles 3rd Round | (Belgium) Elise Mertens [33] | (United States) Madison Keys [14] | 6–7^{(5–7)}, 7–5, 6–4 |
| Men's Singles 3rd Round | (Germany) Alexander Zverev [4] | (Argentina) Tomás Martín Etcheverry | 5–7, 7–5, 6–1, 6–3 |
Matches on Grandstand
| Event | Winner | Loser | Score |
| Women's Singles 3rd Round | (China) Zheng Qinwen [7] | (Germany) Jule Niemeier | 6–2, 6–1 |
| Women's Singles 3rd Round | (China) Wang Yafan | Victoria Azarenka [20] | 6–4, 3–6, 6–1 |
| Men's Singles 3rd Round | Andrey Rublev [6] | (Czech Republic) Jiří Lehečka [32] | 6–3, 7–5, 6–4 |
| Men's Singles 3rd Round | (Norway) Casper Ruud [8] | (China) Shang Juncheng | 6–7^{(1–7)}, 3–6, 6–0, 6–3, 6–1 |
Matches on Stadium 17
| Event | Winner | Loser | Score |
| Women's doubles 2nd Round | (Brazil) Beatriz Haddad Maia [12] (Germany) Laura Siegemund [12] | (United States) Robin Montgomery [WC] (United States) Clervie Ngounoue [WC] | 6–2, 6–2 |
| Women's Singles 3rd Round | (Croatia) Donna Vekić [24] | (United States) Peyton Stearns | 7–5, 6–4 |
| Men's Singles 3rd Round | (Bulgaria) Grigor Dimitrov [9] | (Netherlands) Tallon Griekspoor | 6–3, 6–3, 6–1 |
| Men's Singles 3rd Round | (United States) Brandon Nakashima | (Italy) Lorenzo Musetti [18] | 6–2, 3–6, 6–3, 7–6^{(7–4)} |
Colored background indicates a night match
Day matches began at 11am (12 pm Arthur Ashe Stadium), night matches began at 7pm Eastern Daylight Time (EDT)

== Day 6 (August 31) ==
- Seeds out:
  - Men's Singles: (Italy) Matteo Arnaldi [30], (Italy) Flavio Cobolli [31]
  - Women's Singles: Anna Kalinskaya [15], Anastasia Pavlyuchenkova [25], (Kazakhstan) Yulia Putintseva [30]
  - Women's Doubles: (United States) Caroline Dolehide / (United States) Desirae Krawczyk [4], (Mexico) Giuliana Olmos / Alexandra Panova [13], (Japan) Ena Shibahara / (Indonesia) Aldila Sutjiadi [16]
- Schedule of Play

Matches on main courts
Matches on Arthur Ashe Stadium
| Event | Winner | Loser | Score |
|---|---|---|---|
| Women's Singles 3rd Round | (United States) Jessica Pegula [6] | (Spain) Jéssica Bouzas Maneiro | 6–3, 6–3 |
| Men's Singles 3rd Round | (Italy) Jannik Sinner [1] | (Australia) Christopher O'Connell | 6–1, 6–4, 6–2 |
| Women's Singles 3rd Round | (Poland) Iga Świątek [1] | Anastasia Pavlyuchenkova [25] | 6–4, 6–2 |
| Men's Singles 3rd Round | Daniil Medvedev [5] | (Italy) Flavio Cobolli [31] | 6–3, 6–4, 6–3 |
Matches on Louis Armstrong Stadium
| Event | Winner | Loser | Score |
| Women's Singles 3rd Round | (Italy) Jasmine Paolini [5] | (Kazakhstan) Yulia Putintseva [30] | 6–3, 6–4 |
| Women's Singles 3rd Round | Diana Shnaider [18] | (Italy) Sara Errani | 6–2, 6–2 |
| Men's Singles 3rd Round | (United States) Tommy Paul [14] | (Canada) Gabriel Diallo [Q] | 6–7^{(5–7)}, 6–3, 6–1, 7–6^{(7–3)} |
| Men's Singles 3rd Round | (Australia) Alex de Minaur [10] | (United Kingdom) Daniel Evans | 6–3, 6–7^{(4–7)}, 6–0, 6–0 |
| Women's Singles 3rd Round | (Brazil) Beatriz Haddad Maia [22] | Anna Kalinskaya [15] | 6–3, 6–1 |
Matches on Grandstand
| Event | Winner | Loser | Score |
| Women's Singles 3rd Round | (Czech Republic) Karolína Muchová | Anastasia Potapova | 6–4, 6–2 |
| Men's Singles 3rd Round | (United Kingdom) Jack Draper [25] | (Netherlands) Botic van de Zandschulp | 6–3, 6–4, 6–2 |
| Women's Singles 3rd Round | (Denmark) Caroline Wozniacki | (France) Jessika Ponchet [Q] | 6–3, 6–2 |
| Men's Singles 3rd Round | (Australia) Jordan Thompson | (Italy) Matteo Arnaldi [30] | 7–5, 6–2, 7–6^{(7–5)} |
Matches on Stadium 17
| Event | Winner | Loser | Score |
| Men's Singles 3rd Round | (Czech Republic) Tomáš Macháč | (Belgium) David Goffin | 6–3, 6–1, 6–2 |
| Men's doubles 2nd Round | (United States) Rajeev Ram [3] (United Kingdom) Joe Salisbury [3] | (United Kingdom) Lloyd Glasspool (Australia) Rinky Hijikata | 6–3, 7–6^{(13–11)} |
| Women's Singles 3rd Round | Liudmila Samsonova [16] | (United States) Ashlyn Krueger | 6–1, 6–1 |
| Men's Singles 3rd Round | (Portugal) Nuno Borges | (Czech Republic) Jakub Menšík | 6–7^{(5–7)}, 6–1, 3–6, 7–6^{(8–6)}, 6–0 |
Colored background indicates a night match
Day matches began at 11am (12 pm Arthur Ashe Stadium), night matches began at 7pm Eastern Daylight Time (EDT)

== Day 7 (September 1) ==
- Seeds out:
  - Men's Singles: Andrey Rublev [6], (Norway) Casper Ruud [8], (Australia) Alexei Popyrin [28]
  - Women's Singles: (United States) Coco Gauff [3], (Croatia) Donna Vekić [24], (Belgium) Elise Mertens [33]
  - Men's Doubles: (India) Rohan Bopanna / (Australia) Matthew Ebden [2], (Italy) Simone Bolelli / (Italy) Andrea Vavassori [5]
  - Women's Doubles: (Brazil) Beatriz Haddad Maia / (Germany) Laura Siegemund [12]
- Schedule of Play

Matches on main courts
Matches on Arthur Ashe Stadium
| Event | Winner | Loser | Score |
|---|---|---|---|
| Men's Singles 4th Round | (Bulgaria) Grigor Dimitrov [9] | Andrey Rublev [6] | 6–3, 7–6^{(7–3)}, 1–6, 3–6, 6–3 |
| Women's Singles 4th Round | (United States) Emma Navarro [13] | (United States) Coco Gauff [3] | 6–3, 4–6, 6–3 |
| Men's Singles 4th Round | (United States) Frances Tiafoe [20] | (Australia) Alexei Popyrin [28] | 6–4, 7–6^{(7–3)}, 2–6, 6–3 |
| Women's Singles 4th Round | (China) Zheng Qinwen [7] | (Croatia) Donna Vekić [24] | 7–6^{(7–2)}, 4–6, 6–2 |
Matches on Louis Armstrong Stadium
| Event | Winner | Loser | Score |
| Women's Singles 4th Round | (Spain) Paula Badosa [26] | (China) Wang Yafan | 6–1, 6–2 |
| Men's Singles 4th Round | (United States) Taylor Fritz [12] | (Norway) Casper Ruud [8] | 3–6, 6–4, 6–3, 6–2 |
| Men's Singles 4th Round | (Germany) Alexander Zverev [4] | (United States) Brandon Nakashima | 3–6, 6–1, 6–2, 6–2 |
| Women's Singles 4th Round | Aryna Sabalenka [2] | (Belgium) Elise Mertens [33] | 6–2, 6–4 |
Matches on Grandstand
| Event | Winner | Loser | Score |
| Men's doubles 3rd Round | (Spain) Marcel Granollers [1] (Argentina) Horacio Zeballos [1] | (India) Yuki Bhambri (France) Albano Olivetti | 6–2, 6–2 |
| Women's doubles 3rd Round | (France) Kristina Mladenovic (China) Zhang Shuai | Mirra Andreeva; Anastasia Pavlyuchenkova | 6–2, 6–4 |
| Men's doubles 3rd Round | (Australia) Max Purcell [7] (Australia) Jordan Thompson [7] | (Portugal) Nuno Borges (Portugal) Francisco Cabral | 7–6^{(7–3)}, 6–3 |
| Mixed doubles 2nd Round | (Australia) Ellen Perez (Belgium) Sander Gillé | (United States) Ashlyn Krueger [WC] (United States) Thai-Son Kwiatkowski [WC] | 6–4, 6–7^{(4–7)}, [10–3] |
Matches on Stadium 17
| Event | Winner | Loser | Score |
| Women's doubles 3rd Round | (Czech Republic) Kateřina Siniaková [3] (United States) Taylor Townsend [3] | (United States) Asia Muhammad (United Kingdom) Heather Watson | 6–1, 5–7, 7–5 |
| Women's doubles 3rd Round | (Ukraine) Lyudmyla Kichenok [7] (Latvia) Jeļena Ostapenko [7] | (Brazil) Beatriz Haddad Maia [12] (Germany) Laura Siegemund [12] | 6–3, 7–6^{(7–5)} |
| Mixed doubles 2nd Round | (Kazakhstan) Anna Danilina (Finland) Harri Heliövaara | (Spain) Cristina Bucșa (Belgium) Joran Vliegen | 4–6, 6–3, [10–8] |
Colored background indicates a night match
Day matches began at 11am (12 pm Arthur Ashe Stadium), night matches began at 7pm Eastern Daylight Time (EDT)

== Day 8 (September 2) ==
- Seeds out:
  - Men's Singles: (United States) Tommy Paul [14]
  - Women's Singles: (Italy) Jasmine Paolini [5], Liudmila Samsonova [16], Diana Shnaider [18]
  - Men's Doubles: (United States) Rajeev Ram / (United Kingdom) Joe Salisbury [3], (Finland) Harri Heliövaara / (United Kingdom) Henry Patten [6], (Croatia) Ivan Dodig / (Czech Republic) Adam Pavlásek [14]
  - Women's Doubles: (United States) Sofia Kenin / (United States) Bethanie Mattek-Sands [9], (Czech Republic) Marie Bouzková / (Spain) Sara Sorribes Tormo [11]
  - Mixed Doubles: (Czech Republic) Barbora Krejčíková / (Australia) Matthew Ebden [4], (Chinese Taipei) Hsieh Su-wei / (Poland) Jan Zieliński [7]
- Schedule of Play

Matches on main courts
Matches on Arthur Ashe Stadium
| Event | Winner | Loser | Score |
|---|---|---|---|
| Women's Singles 4th Round | (United States) Jessica Pegula [6] | Diana Shnaider [18] | 6–4, 6–2 |
| Men's Singles 4th Round | Daniil Medvedev [5] | (Portugal) Nuno Borges | 6–0, 6–1, 6–3 |
| Women's Singles 4th Round | (Poland) Iga Świątek [1] | Liudmila Samsonova [16] | 6–4, 6–1 |
| Men's Singles 4th Round | (Italy) Jannik Sinner [1] | (United States) Tommy Paul [14] | 7–6^{(7–3)}, 7–6^{(7–5)}, 6–1 |
Matches on Louis Armstrong Stadium
| Event | Winner | Loser | Score |
| Women's Singles 4th Round | (Czech Republic) Karolína Muchová | (Italy) Jasmine Paolini [5] | 6–3, 6–3 |
| Men's Singles 4th Round | (United Kingdom) Jack Draper [25] | (Czech Republic) Tomáš Macháč | 6–3, 6–1, 6–2 |
| Women's Singles 4th Round | (Brazil) Beatriz Haddad Maia [22] | (Denmark) Caroline Wozniacki | 6–2, 3–6, 6–3 |
| Men's Singles 4th Round | (Australia) Alex de Minaur [10] | (Australia) Jordan Thompson | 6–0, 3–6, 6–3, 7–5 |
Matches on Grandstand
| Event | Winner | Loser | Score |
| Men's doubles 3rd Round | (El Salvador) Marcelo Arévalo [4] (Croatia) Mate Pavić [4] | (Croatia) Ivan Dodig [14] (Czech Republic) Adam Pavlásek [14] | 7–5, 7–6^{(7–4)} |
| Men's doubles 3rd Round | (United States) Nathaniel Lammons [13] (United States) Jackson Withrow [13] | (United States) Rajeev Ram [3] (United Kingdom) Joe Salisbury [3] | 7–6^{(7–3)}, 6–3 |
| Women's doubles 3rd Round | (Netherlands) Demi Schuurs [8] (Brazil) Luisa Stefani [8] | (United States) Sofia Kenin [9] (United States) Bethanie Mattek-Sands [9] | 6–4, 6–3 |
| Mixed doubles Quarterfinals | (United States) Taylor Townsend [WC] (United States) Donald Young [WC] | (Kazakhstan) Anna Danilina (Finland) Harri Heliövaara | 6–7^{(3–7)}, 6–3, [10–8] |
Matches on Stadium 17
| Event | Winner | Loser | Score |
| Women's doubles 3rd Round | (United States) Nicole Melichar-Martinez [5] (Australia) Ellen Perez [5] | (Czech Republic) Marie Bouzková [11] (Spain) Sara Sorribes Tormo [11] | 6–2, 6–4 |
| Women's doubles 3rd Round | (Kazakhstan) Anna Danilina; Irina Khromacheva | (Slovakia) Tereza Mihalíková (United Kingdom) Olivia Nicholls | 6–4, 6–4 |
| Men's doubles 3rd Round | (United Kingdom) Neal Skupski [8] (New Zealand) Michael Venus [8] | (United States) Tristan Boyer [WC] (United States) Emilio Nava [WC] | 3–6, 7–6^{(7–3)}, 6–4 |
| Mixed doubles Quarterfinals | (United States) Tyra Caterina Grant [WC] (United States) Aleksandar Kovacevic [WC] | (Australia) Ellen Perez (Belgium) Sander Gillé | Walkover |
Colored background indicates a night match
Day matches begin at 11am (12 pm Arthur Ashe Stadium), night matches began at 7pm Eastern Daylight Time (EDT)

== Day 9 (September 3) ==
- Seeds out:
  - Men's Singles: (Germany) Alexander Zverev [4], (Bulgaria) Grigor Dimitrov [9]
  - Women's Singles: (China) Zheng Qinwen [7], (Spain) Paula Badosa [26]
  - Men's Doubles: (Spain) Marcel Granollers / (Argentina) Horacio Zeballos [1], (United Kingdom) Neal Skupski / (New Zealand) Michael Venus [8], (Netherlands) Wesley Koolhof / (Croatia) Nikola Mektić [11], (Argentina) Máximo González / (Argentina) Andrés Molteni [16]
  - Women's Doubles: (Canada) Gabriela Dabrowski / (New Zealand) Erin Routliffe [1], (United States) Nicole Melichar-Martinez / (Australia) Ellen Perez [5], (Netherlands) Demi Schuurs / (Brazil) Luisa Stefani [8]
  - Mixed Doubles: (Indonesia) Aldila Sutjiadi / (India) Rohan Bopanna [8]
- Schedule of Play

Matches on main courts
Matches on Arthur Ashe Stadium
| Event | Winner | Loser | Score |
|---|---|---|---|
| Women's Singles Quarterfinals | (United States) Emma Navarro [13] | (Spain) Paula Badosa [26] | 6–2, 7–5 |
| Men's Singles Quarterfinals | (United States) Taylor Fritz [12] | (Germany) Alexander Zverev [4] | 7–6^{(7–2)}, 3–6, 6–4, 7–6^{(7–3)} |
| Women's Singles Quarterfinals | Aryna Sabalenka [2] | (China) Zheng Qinwen [7] | 6–1, 6–2 |
| Men's Singles Quarterfinals | (United States) Frances Tiafoe [20] | (Bulgaria) Grigor Dimitrov [9] | 6–3, 6–7^{(5–7)}, 6–3, 4–1 retired |
Matches on Louis Armstrong Stadium
| Event | Winner | Loser | Score |
| Women's Doubles Quarterfinals | (France) Kristina Mladenovic (China) Zhang Shuai | (United States) Nicole Melichar-Martinez (Australia) Ellen Perez [5] | 7–6^{(7–2)}, 6–4 |
| Women's Doubles Quarterfinals | (Czech Republic) Kateřina Siniaková [3] (United States) Taylor Townsend [3] | (Netherlands) Demi Schuurs [8] (Brazil) Luisa Stefani [8] | 6–2, 6–3 |
| Men's Doubles Quarterfinals | (Australia) Max Purcell [7] (Australia) Jordan Thompson [7] | (Spain) Marcel Granollers [1] (Argentina) Horacio Zeballos [1] | 7–6^{(7–4)}, 6–4 |
| Men's Doubles Quarterfinals | (United States) Nathaniel Lammons [13] (United States) Jackson Withrow [13] | (Netherlands) Wesley Koolhof [11] (Croatia) Nikola Mektić [11] | 6–1, 6–7^{(5–7)}, 6–4 |
| Mixed Doubles Semifinals | (United States) Taylor Townsend [WC] (United States) Donald Young [WC] | (Indonesia) Aldila Sutjiadi [8] (India) Rohan Bopanna [8] | 6–3, 6–4 |
Matches on Grandstand
| Event | Winner | Loser | Score |
| Men's Doubles Quarterfinals | (Germany) Kevin Krawietz (Germany) Tim Pütz [10] | (Argentina) Máximo González (Argentina) Andrés Molteni [16] | 6–7^{(11–13)}, 6–4, 6–1 |
| Women's Doubles Quarterfinals | (Ukraine) Lyudmyla Kichenok [7] (Latvia) Jeļena Ostapenko [7] | (Kazakhstan) Anna Danilina; Irina Khromacheva | 7–6^{(7–2)}, 6–4 |
| Women's Doubles Quarterfinals | (Chinese Taipei) Chan Hao-ching [10] Veronika Kudermetova [10] | (Canada) Gabriela Dabrowski [1] (New Zealand) Erin Routliffe [1] | 4–6, 7–5, 6–3 |
| Mixed Doubles Semifinals | (Italy) Sara Errani [3] (Italy) Andrea Vavassori [3] | (United States) Tyra Caterina Grant [WC] (United States) Aleksandar Kovacevic [WC] | 6–3, 7–5 |
| Men's Doubles Quarterfinals | (El Salvador) Marcelo Arévalo [4] (Croatia) Mate Pavić [4] | (United Kingdom) Neal Skupski [8] (New Zealand) Michael Venus [8] | 7–6^{(7–1)}, 6–1 |
Colored background indicates a night match
Day matches began at 11am (12 pm Arthur Ashe Stadium), night matches began at 7pm Eastern Daylight Time (EDT)

== Day 10 (September 4) ==
- Seeds out:
  - Men's Singles: Daniil Medvedev [5], (Australia) Alex de Minaur [10]
  - Women's Singles: (Poland) Iga Świątek [1], (Brazil) Beatriz Haddad Maia [22]
  - Women's Doubles: (Czech Republic) Kateřina Siniaková / (United States) Taylor Townsend [3], (Chinese Taipei) Chan Hao-ching / Veronika Kudermetova [10]
- Schedule of Play

Matches on main courts
Matches on Arthur Ashe Stadium
| Event | Winner | Loser | Score |
|---|---|---|---|
| Women's Singles Quarterfinals | (Czech Republic) Karolína Muchová | (Brazil) Beatriz Haddad Maia [22] | 6–1, 6–4 |
| Men's Singles Quarterfinals | (United Kingdom) Jack Draper [25] | (Australia) Alex de Minaur [10] | 6–3, 7–5, 6–2 |
| Women's Singles Quarterfinals | (United States) Jessica Pegula [6] | (Poland) Iga Świątek [1] | 6–2, 6–4 |
| Men's Singles Quarterfinals | (Italy) Jannik Sinner [1] | Daniil Medvedev [5] | 6–2, 1–6, 6–1, 6–4 |
Matches on Louis Armstrong Stadium
| Event | Winner | Loser | Score |
| Girls' Singles 3rd Round | (United States) Iva Jovic [3] | (Kazakhstan) Sonja Zhiyenbayeva [14] | 6–1, 6–2 |
| Boys' Singles 3rd Round | (United States) Kaylan Bigun [2] | (United States) Matthew Forbes [WC] | 6–2, 6–4 |
| Women's Doubles Semifinals | (Ukraine) Lyudmyla Kichenok [7] (Latvia) Jeļena Ostapenko [7] | (Chinese Taipei) Chan Hao-ching [10] Veronika Kudermetova [10] | 6–1, 6–2 |
| Women's Doubles Semifinals | (France) Kristina Mladenovic (China) Zhang Shuai | (Czech Republic) Kateřina Siniaková [3] (United States) Taylor Townsend [3] | 7–5, 4–6, 6–3 |
Colored background indicates a night match
Day matches began at 11am (12 pm Arthur Ashe Stadium), night matches began at 7pm Eastern Daylight Time (EDT)

== Day 11 (September 5) ==
- Seeds out:
  - Women's Singles: (United States) Emma Navarro [13]
  - Men's Doubles: (El Salvador) Marcelo Arévalo / (Croatia) Mate Pavić [4], (United States) Nathaniel Lammons / (United States) Jackson Withrow [13]
- Schedule of Play

Matches on main courts
Matches on Arthur Ashe Stadium
| Event | Winner | Loser | Score |
|---|---|---|---|
| Mixed Doubles Final | (Italy) Sara Errani [3] (Italy) Andrea Vavassori [3] | (United States) Taylor Townsend [WC] (United States) Donald Young [WC] | 7–6^{(7–0)}, 7–5 |
| Women's Singles Semifinals | Aryna Sabalenka [2] | (United States) Emma Navarro [13] | 6–3, 7–6^{(7–2)} |
| Women's Singles Semifinals | (United States) Jessica Pegula [6] | (Czech Republic) Karolína Muchová | 1–6, 6–4, 6–2 |
Matches on Louis Armstrong Stadium
| Event | Winner | Loser | Score |
| Boys' Singles Quarterfinals | (Spain) Rafael Jódar [12] | (United States) Kaylan Bigun [2] | 6–3, 7–6^{(9–7)}, 7–5 |
| Girls' Singles Quarterfinals | (United Kingdom) Mingge Xu [8] | (United States) Tyra Caterina Grant [2] | 7–5, 5–7, 6–4 |
| Men's Doubles Semifinals | (Australia) Max Purcell [7] (Australia) Jordan Thompson [7] | (United States) Nathaniel Lammons [13] (United States) Jackson Withrow [13] | 6–4, 7–6^{(7–4)} |
| Men's Doubles Semifinals | (Germany) Kevin Krawietz [10] (Germany) Tim Pütz [10] | (El Salvador) Marcelo Arévalo [4] (Croatia) Mate Pavić [4] | 6–3, 6–7^{(9–11)}, 6–4 |
Colored background indicates a night match
Day matches began at 12pm (3 pm Arthur Ashe Stadium), night matches began at 7pm Eastern Daylight Time (EDT)

== Day 12 (September 6) ==
- Seeds out:
  - Men's Singles: (United States) Frances Tiafoe [20], (United Kingdom) Jack Draper [25]
- Schedule of Play

Matches on main courts
Matches on Arthur Ashe Stadium
| Event | Winner | Loser | Score |
|---|---|---|---|
| Women's Doubles Final | (Ukraine) Lyudmyla Kichenok [7] (Latvia) Jeļena Ostapenko [7] | (France) Kristina Mladenovic (China) Zhang Shuai | 6–4, 6–3 |
| Men's Singles Semifinals | (Italy) Jannik Sinner [1] | (United Kingdom) Jack Draper [25] | 7–5, 7–6^{(7–3)}, 6–2 |
| Men's Singles Semifinals | (United States) Taylor Fritz [12] | (United States) Frances Tiafoe [20] | 4–6, 7–5, 4–6, 6–4, 6–1 |
Colored background indicates a night match
Day matches began at 12pm, night matches began at 7pm Eastern Daylight Time (EDT)

== Day 13 (September 7) ==
- Seeds out:
  - Women's Singles: (United States) Jessica Pegula [6]
  - Men's Doubles: (Germany) Kevin Krawietz / (Germany) Tim Pütz [10]
- Schedule of Play

Matches on main courts
Matches on Arthur Ashe Stadium
| Event | Winner | Loser | Score |
|---|---|---|---|
| Men's Doubles Final | (Australia) Max Purcell [7] (Australia) Jordan Thompson [7] | (Germany) Kevin Krawietz [10] (Germany) Tim Pütz [10] | 6–4, 7–6^{(7–4)} |
| Women's Singles Final | Aryna Sabalenka [2] | (United States) Jessica Pegula [6] | 7–5, 7–5 |
Matches began at 12pm Eastern Daylight Time (EDT)

== Day 14 (September 8) ==
- Seeds out:
  - Men's Singles: (United States) Taylor Fritz [12]
- Schedule of Play

Matches on main courts
Matches on Arthur Ashe Stadium
| Event | Winner | Loser | Score |
|---|---|---|---|
| Men's Singles Final | (Italy) Jannik Sinner [1] | (United States) Taylor Fritz [12] | 6–3, 6–4, 7–5 |
Match began at 2pm Eastern Daylight Time (EDT)
