= 2026 Kingston Open II =

- Date: 24–29 August
- Edition: 2nd
- Surface: Hard
- Location: Kingston, Jamaica

Champions

Singles
- (United States) Aidan Mayo

Doubles
- (France) Arthur Reymond / (France) Luca Sanchez
- Kingston Open

The 2026 Kingston Open II was a professional tennis tournament played on hardcourts. It was the second edition of the tournament which was part of the 2026 ATP Challenger Tour. It took place in Kingston, Jamaica between 24 and 29 August 2026.

== Singles main draw entrants ==
=== Seeds ===
Country	Player	Rank^{1}	Seed
~~FRA~~	~~Harold Mayot~~	~~252~~	~~1~~
ECU	Andy Andrade	256	2
ECU	Álvaro Guillén Meza	283	3
MEX	Rodrigo Pacheco Méndez	292	4
BRA	Igor Marcondes	316	5
USA	Andres Martin	320	6
USA	Tyler Zink	325	7
ARG	Juan Pablo Ficovich	350	8

- ^{1} Rankings as of 10 August 2026.

=== Other entrants ===
The following players received wildcards into the singles main draw:

- (Jamaica) John Chin
- (United States) Matthew Forbes
- (Australia) Max Purcell

The following player received entry into the singles main draw using a protected ranking:

- (Netherlands) Gijs Brouwer

The following players received entry into the singles main draw through the Junior Accelerator programme:

- (Brazil) Guto Miguel
- (United States) Benjamin Willwerth

The following player received entry into the singles main draw as an alternate:

- (Italy) Pietro Fellin

The following players received entry from the qualifying draw:

- (United States) Kaylan Bigun
- (United States) Keshav Chopra
- (Australia) Thomas Fancutt
- (Spain) Mario González Fernández
- (United States) Aidan Kim
- (United States) Evan Zhu

The following player received entry as a lucky loser:

- (United States) Aidan Mayo

== Champions ==
=== Singles ===
- (United States) Aidan Mayo def. (Ecuador) Andy Andrade 6–3, 7–6^{(9–7)}.

=== Doubles ===
- (France) Arthur Reymond / (France) Luca Sanchez def. (Bulgaria) Alexander Donski / (Canada) Dan Martin 6–2, 6–4.
