= 2026 Kingston Open II – Doubles =

Doubles
- 2026 Kingston Open II

Final
- Champions: (France) Arthur Reymond (France) Luca Sanchez
- Runners-up: (Bulgaria) Alexander Donski (Canada) Dan Martin
- Score: 6–2, 6–4

Events
| Singles | Doubles |
- Kingston Open

Arthur Reymond and Luca Sanchez were the defending champions and successfully defended their title after defeating Alexander Donski and Dan Martin 6–2, 6–4 in the final.

== Seeds ==
1. (France) Arthur Reymond / (France) Luca Sanchez (champions)
2. Ivan Liutarevich / (Mexico) Miguel Ángel Reyes-Varela (first round)
3. (India) Siddhant Banthia / (India) Arjun Kadhe (semifinals)
4. (Brazil) Igor Marcondes / (Brazil) Marcelo Zormann (first round)

== Draw ==
Key

- Q = Qualifier
- WC = Wild card
- LL = Lucky loser
- Alt = Alternate
- ITF = ITF entry
- PR = Protected ranking
- SR = Special ranking
- SE = Special exempt
- JE = Junior exempt
- JR = Junior Accelerator Programme entrant
- CO = College Accelerator Programme entrant
- NG = Next Gen Accelerator Program entrant
- w/o = Walkover
- r = Retired
- d = Defaulted

First round
1 | (France) A Reymond (France) L Sanchez | 6 | 6
(United States) J Sheehy (United States) T Zink | 4 | 2
(Venezuela) Juan José Bianchi (Australia) K Pearson | 3 | 6 | [10]
(Brazil) L Britto (Brazil) PA Saraiva dos Santos | 6 | 2 | [8]
3 | (India) S Banthia (India) A Kadhe | 7^{10} | 6
(United States) G Johns (United States) K Poling | 6^{8} | 3
WC | (United States) M Forbes (United States) Aidan Kim | 7 | 7^{7}
(United States) K Chopra (Spain) Iván Marrero Curbelo | 5 | 6^{2}
(Australia) T Fancutt (Japan) S Watanabe | 7^{7} | 6
(Peru) A Huertas del Pino (Mexico) R Pacheco Méndez | 6^{4} | 3
(Bulgaria) A Donski (Canada) D Martin | 7 | 3 | [10]
4 | (Brazil) I Marcondes (Brazil) M Zormann | 5 | 6 | [5]
WC | (Jamaica) B Bicknell (United States) A Fenty
(Brazil) Bruno Oliveira (Brazil) Natan Rodrigues | w/o
(Australia) C Puttergill (New Zealand) A Rai | 5 | 6 | [13]
2 | I Liutarevich (Mexico) M Reyes-Varela | 7 | 3 | [11]

Quarterfinals
1 | (France) A Reymond (France) L Sanchez | 6 | 6
(Venezuela) JJ Bianchi (Australia) K Pearson | 4 | 4
3 | (India) S Banthia (India) A Kadhe | w/o
WC | (United States) M Forbes (United States) A Kim
(Australia) T Fancutt (Japan) S Watanabe | 6^{1} | 4
(Bulgaria) A Donski (Canada) D Martin | 7^{7} | 6
(Brazil) B Oliveira (Brazil) N Rodrigues | 6^{7} | 6 | [4]
(Australia) C Puttergill (New Zealand) A Rai | 7^{9} | 3 | [10]

Semifinals
1 | (France) A Reymond (France) L Sanchez | 6 | 6
3 | (India) S Banthia (India) A Kadhe | 4 | 4
(Bulgaria) A Donski (Canada) D Martin | 4 | 6 | [14]
(Australia) C Puttergill (New Zealand) A Rai | 6 | 3 | [12]

Final
1 | (France) A Reymond (France) L Sanchez | 6 | 6
(Bulgaria) A Donski (Canada) D Martin | 2 | 4
