= 2026 Kingston Open – Doubles =

Doubles
- 2026 Kingston Open

Final
- Champions: (France) Arthur Reymond (France) Luca Sanchez
- Runners-up: (Slovenia) Blaž Kavčič (Australia) Max Purcell
- Score: 6–4, 2–6, [12–10]

Events
Singles	Doubles
- Kingston Open

This was the first edition of the tournament.

Arthur Reymond and Luca Sanchez won the title after defeating Blaž Kavčič and Max Purcell 6–4, 2–6, [12–10] in the final.

== Seeds ==
1. (France) Arthur Reymond / (France) Luca Sanchez (champions)
2. (India) Siddhant Banthia / (India) Arjun Kadhe (first round)
3. (Brazil) Igor Marcondes / (Brazil) Marcelo Zormann (semifinals)
4. (Brazil) Gustavo Heide / (Brazil) Guto Miguel (quarterfinals, withdrew)

== Draw ==
Key

- Q = Qualifier
- WC = Wild card
- LL = Lucky loser
- Alt = Alternate
- ITF = ITF entry
- PR = Protected ranking
- SR = Special ranking
- SE = Special exempt
- JE = Junior exempt
- JR = Junior Accelerator Programme entrant
- CO = College Accelerator Programme entrant
- NG = Next Gen Accelerator Program entrant
- w/o = Walkover
- r = Retired
- d = Defaulted

First round
1	(France) A Reymond (France) L Sanchez	6	6
Alt	(United States) J Sheehy (United States) T Zink	3	4
(Venezuela) Juan José Bianchi (Australia) K Pearson	w/o
(France) F Bax (France) H Mayot
3	(Brazil) I Marcondes (Brazil) M Zormann	7^{7}	6
WC	(United States) Aidan Kim (Canada) D Martin	6^{2}	3
(Brazil) L Britto (Brazil) PA Saraiva dos Santos	6	6
(United States) K Chopra (Spain) Iván Marrero Curbelo	4	2
(New Zealand) Reece Falck (United States) B Suarez	3	6	[10]
Alt	(Argentina) JP Ficovich (Peru) A Huertas del Pino	6	4	[7]
(Brazil) Bruno Oliveira (Brazil) Natan Rodrigues	5	0^{r}
4	(Brazil) G Heide (Brazil) G Miguel	7	0
(Australia) T Fancutt (Japan) S Watanabe	6	7
Alt	(Italy) Pietro Fellin (Australia) E Winter	4	5
WC	(Slovenia) B Kavčič (Australia) M Purcell	6	7^{7}
2	(India) S Banthia (India) A Kadhe	1	6^{2}

Quarterfinals
1	(France) A Reymond (France) L Sanchez	6	7
(Venezuela) JJ Bianchi (Australia) K Pearson	4	5
3	(Brazil) I Marcondes (Brazil) M Zormann	6	6
(Brazil) L Britto (Brazil) PA Saraiva dos Santos	4	4
(New Zealand) R Falck (United States) B Suarez	w/o
4	(Brazil) G Heide (Brazil) G Miguel
(Australia) T Fancutt (Japan) S Watanabe	6	3	[5]
WC	(Slovenia) B Kavčič (Australia) M Purcell	4	6	[10]

Semifinals
1	(France) A Reymond (France) L Sanchez	6	6^{0}	[10]
3	(Brazil) I Marcondes (Brazil) M Zormann	2	7^{7}	[6]
(New Zealand) R Falck (United States) B Suarez	1	5
WC	(Slovenia) B Kavčič (Australia) M Purcell	6	7

Final
1	(France) A Reymond (France) L Sanchez	6	2	[12]
WC	(Slovenia) B Kavčič (Australia) M Purcell	4	6	[10]
