= 2026 Kingston Open II – Singles =

Singles
- 2026 Kingston Open II

Final
- Champion: (United States) Aidan Mayo
- Runner-up: (Ecuador) Andy Andrade
- Score: 6–3, 7–6^{(9–7)}

Events
Singles	Doubles
- Kingston Open

Valentin Royer was the defending champion but chose not to defend his title.

Aidan Mayo won the title after defeating Andy Andrade 6–3, 7–6^{(9–7)} in the final.

== Seeds ==
1. (France) Harold Mayot (withdrew)
2. (Ecuador) Andy Andrade (final)
3. (Ecuador) Álvaro Guillén Meza (first round)
4. (Mexico) Rodrigo Pacheco Méndez (semifinals)
5. (Brazil) Igor Marcondes (first round)
6. (United States) Andres Martin (quarterfinals)
7. (United States) Tyler Zink (first round)
8. (Argentina) Juan Pablo Ficovich (second round)

== Draw ==
Key

- Q = Qualifier
- WC = Wild card
- LL = Lucky loser
- Alt = Alternate
- ITF = ITF entry
- PR = Protected ranking
- SR = Special ranking
- SE = Special exempt
- JE = Junior exempt
- JR = Junior Accelerator Programme entrant
- CO = College Accelerator Programme entrant
- NG = Next Gen Accelerator Program entrant
- w/o = Walkover
- r = Retired
- d = Defaulted

=== Finals ===
Semifinals
LL	(United States) Aidan Mayo	6	6
JR	(Brazil) Guto Miguel	3	4
4	(Mexico) Rodrigo Pacheco Méndez	3	6	4
2	(Ecuador) Andy Andrade	6	3	6

Final
LL	(United States) Aidan Mayo	6	7^{9}
2	(Ecuador) Andy Andrade	3	6^{7}

=== Top half ===
First round
LL	(United States) A Mayo	7	7
WC	(United States) M Forbes	5	5
WC	(Jamaica) John Chin	4	4
JR	(United States) Benjamin Willwerth	6	6
(Mexico) A Hernández	1	4
(Brazil) PA Saraiva dos Santos	6	6
PR	(Netherlands) G Brouwer	7	6^{3}	0
6	(United States) A Martin	5	7^{7}	6
3	(Ecuador) Á Guillén Meza	5	4
(United States) A Fenty	7	6
Q	(United States) K Chopra	2	6	6
Q	(United States) K Bigun	6	3	3
(United States) K Poling	4	3
Q	(Australia) T Fancutt	6	6
JR	(Brazil) G Miguel	6	6
7	(United States) T Zink	4	2

Second round
LL	(United States) A Mayo	6	2	6
JR	(United States) B Willwerth	4	6	4
(Brazil) PA Saraiva dos Santos	7	3	4
6	(United States) A Martin	5	6	6
(United States) A Fenty	6	6
Q	(United States) K Chopra	2	3
Q	(Australia) T Fancutt	2	3
JR	(Brazil) G Miguel	6	6

Quarterfinals
LL	(United States) A Mayo	6	6
6	(United States) A Martin	4	4
(United States) A Fenty	5	5
JR	(Brazil) G Miguel	7	7

Semifinals
LL	(United States) A Mayo	6	6
JR	(Brazil) G Miguel	3	4

=== Bottom half ===
First round
8	(Argentina) JP Ficovich	7^{10}	4	6
Q	(United States) E Zhu	6^{8}	6	2
Alt	(Italy) Pietro Fellin	2	1
(Colombia) Miguel Tobón	6	6
Q	(Spain) Mario González Fernández	7^{7}	7
(United States) M Krueger	6^{5}	5
(United Kingdom) P Jubb	4	4
4	(Mexico) R Pacheco Méndez	6	6
5	(Brazil) I Marcondes	4	2
WC	(Australia) M Purcell	6	6
Q	(United States) Aidan Kim	7^{7}	3	2
(United States) G Johns	6^{1}	6	6
(Spain) Iván Marrero Curbelo	3	7	6
(Jamaica) B Bicknell	6	5	2
(Australia) E Winter	4	6^{5}
2	(Ecuador) A Andrade	6	7^{7}

Second round
8	(Argentina) JP Ficovich	3	1
(Colombia) M Tobón	6	6
Q	(Spain) M González Fernández	3	3
4	(Mexico) R Pacheco Méndez	6	6
WC	(Australia) M Purcell	6	6
(United States) G Johns	2	2
(Spain) I Marrero Curbelo	4	2
2	(Ecuador) A Andrade	6	6

Quarterfinals
(Colombia) M Tobón	2	4
4	(Mexico) R Pacheco Méndez	6	6
WC	(Australia) M Purcell	3	3
2	(Ecuador) A Andrade	6	6

Semifinals
4	(Mexico) R Pacheco Méndez	3	6	4
2	(Ecuador) A Andrade	6	3	6
