= 2026 Kingston Open – Singles =

Singles
- 2026 Kingston Open

Final
- Champion: (France) Valentin Royer
- Runner-up: (Spain) Pedro Martínez
- Score: 6–4, 6–2

Events
Singles	Doubles
- Kingston Open

This was the first edition of the tournament.

Valentin Royer won the title after defeating Pedro Martínez 6–4, 6–2 in the final.

== Seeds ==
1. (France) Valentin Royer (champion)
2. (Brazil) Gustavo Heide (first round)
3. (Austria) Joel Schwärzler (first round)
4. (Spain) Pedro Martínez (final)
5. (Bolivia) Juan Carlos Prado Ángelo (quarterfinals)
6. (Estonia) Daniil Glinka (semifinals)
7. (Peru) Gonzalo Bueno (quarterfinals)
8. (Argentina) Lautaro Midón (quarterfinals)

== Draw ==
Key

- Q = Qualifier
- WC = Wild card
- LL = Lucky loser
- Alt = Alternate
- ITF = ITF entry
- PR = Protected ranking
- SR = Special ranking
- SE = Special exempt
- JE = Junior exempt
- JR = Junior Accelerator Programme entrant
- CO = College Accelerator Programme entrant
- NG = Next Gen Accelerator Program entrant
- w/o = Walkover
- r = Retired
- d = Defaulted

=== Finals ===
Semifinals
1	(France) Valentin Royer	2	7	6
(France) Clément Chidekh	6	5	1
4	(Spain) Pedro Martínez	7	6
6	(Estonia) Daniil Glinka	5	3

Final
1	(France) Valentin Royer	6	6
4	(Spain) Pedro Martínez	4	2

=== Top half ===
First round
1	(France) V Royer	6	6^{3}	6
JR	(Brazil) G Miguel	1	7^{7}	2
Q	(Brazil) Lucas Andrade da Silva	5	7	4
Alt	(United States) T Zink	7	5	6
WC	(Jamaica) John Chin	1	1
Q	(Australia) E Winter	6	6
JR	(United States) Benjamin Willwerth	6	2	2
7	(Peru) G Bueno	3	6	6
3	(Austria) J Schwärzler	2	5
Q	(Japan) Kenta Miyoshi	6	7
(United Kingdom) J Clarke	3	6	4
(France) C Chidekh	6	4	6
(Ecuador) Á Guillén Meza	4	2
(Brazil) I Marcondes	6	6
WC	(Canada) D Martin	3	7	4
8	(Argentina) L Midón	6	5	6

Second round
1	(France) V Royer	6	7
Alt	(United States) T Zink	3	5
Q	(Australia) E Winter	4	2
7	(Peru) G Bueno	6	6
Q	(Japan) K Miyoshi	2	4
(France) C Chidekh	6	6
(Brazil) I Marcondes	7^{7}	3	0^{r}
8	(Argentina) L Midón	6^{3}	6	0

Quarterfinals
1	(France) V Royer	6	6
7	(Peru) G Bueno	1	1
(France) C Chidekh	6	6
8	(Argentina) L Midón	1	3

Semifinals
1	(France) V Royer	2	7	6
(France) C Chidekh	6	5	1

=== Bottom half ===
First round
5	(Bolivia) JC Prado Ángelo	6	6
(Argentina) JP Ficovich	3	2
(Canada) L Draxl	2	3
(Ecuador) A Andrade	6	6
Q	(United States) G Johns	2	6	3
Q	(Brazil) PA Saraiva dos Santos	6	4	2^{r}
Q	(United States) E Zhu	5	4
4	(Spain) P Martínez	7	6
6	(Estonia) D Glinka	2	6	6
(France) F Bax	6	3	0
(Sweden) E Ymer	6	6
Alt	(United Kingdom) P Jubb	4	4
Alt	(Jamaica) B Bicknell	4	7^{7}	3
WC	(Australia) M Purcell	6	6^{3}	6
(France) H Mayot	6	6
2	(Brazil) G Heide	3	2

Second round
5	(Bolivia) JC Prado Ángelo	3	6	6
(Ecuador) A Andrade	6	3	2
Q	(United States) G Johns	4	1
4	(Spain) P Martínez	6	6
6	(Estonia) D Glinka	6	6
(Sweden) E Ymer	4	3
WC	(Australia) M Purcell	6	3	4
(France) H Mayot	3	6	6

Quarterfinals
5	(Bolivia) JC Prado Ángelo	7^{7}	4	3
4	(Spain) P Martínez	6^{4}	6	6
6	(Estonia) D Glinka	6	6
(France) H Mayot	3	4

Semifinals
4	(Spain) P Martínez	7	6
6	(Estonia) D Glinka	5	3
