= 2026 Open Quimper Bretagne – Singles =

Singles
- 2026 Open Quimper Bretagne

Final
- Champion: (France) Luca Van Assche
- Runner-up: (Switzerland) Rémy Bertola
- Score: 3–6, 6–1, 7–5

Events
Singles	Doubles
- Open Quimper Bretagne

Sascha Gueymard Wayenburg was the defending champion, but lost in the semifinals to Luca Van Assche.

Van Assche won the title after defeating Rémy Bertola 3–6, 6–1, 7–5 in the final.

== Seeds ==
1. (United States) Aleksandar Kovacevic (second round)
2. (France) Adrian Mannarino (first round)
3. (Spain) Pedro Martínez (second round)
4. (France) Quentin Halys (first round)
5. (Kazakhstan) Alexander Shevchenko (first round)
6. (Georgia (country)) Nikoloz Basilashvili (second round)
7. (France) Benjamin Bonzi (quarterfinals)
8. (United States) Mackenzie McDonald (quarterfinals, retired)

== Draw ==
Key

- Q = Qualifier
- WC = Wild card
- LL = Lucky loser
- Alt = Alternate
- ITF = ITF entry
- PR = Protected ranking
- SR = Special ranking
- SE = Special exempt
- JE = Junior exempt
- JR = Junior Accelerator Programme entrant
- CO = College Accelerator Programme entrant
- NG = Next Gen Accelerator Program entrant
- w/o = Walkover
- r = Retired
- d = Defaulted

=== Finals ===
Semifinals
(France) Luca Van Assche	6	5	7^{7}
(France) Sascha Gueymard Wayenburg	4	7	6^{1}
(Switzerland) Marc-Andrea Hüsler	1	4
Alt	(Switzerland) Rémy Bertola	6	6

Final
(France) Luca Van Assche	3	6	7
Alt	(Switzerland) Rémy Bertola	6	1	5

=== Top half ===
First round
1	(United States) A Kovacevic	7^{7}	6
(France) C Tabur	6^{4}	4
Q	(Italy) F Arnaboldi	5	4
(France) T Droguet	7	6
(Slovakia) A Molčan	6	6
(France) D Added	4	3
(France) L Van Assche	6	6
5	(Kazakhstan) A Shevchenko	4	4
3	(Spain) P Martínez	6	7
(France) A Bouquier	4	5
(France) S Gueymard Wayenburg	6	6
Q	(France) L Lokoli	1	2
LL	(Canada) D Martin	4	4
(United Kingdom) B Harris	6	6
WC	(France) B Paire	4	3
7	(France) B Bonzi	6	6

Second round
1	(United States) A Kovacevic	6^{4}	6^{8}
(France) T Droguet	7^{7}	7^{10}
(Slovakia) A Molčan	4	4
(France) L Van Assche	6	6
3	(Spain) P Martínez	6^{5}	1
(France) S Gueymard Wayenburg	7^{7}	6
(United Kingdom) B Harris	4	0
7	(France) B Bonzi	6	6

Quarterfinals
(France) T Droguet	4	4
(France) L Van Assche	6	6
(France) S Gueymard Wayenburg	6	6^{3}	7
7	(France) B Bonzi	2	7^{7}	5

Semifinals
(France) L Van Assche	6	5	7^{7}
(France) S Gueymard Wayenburg	4	7	6^{1}

=== Bottom half ===
First round
6	(Georgia (country)) N Basilashvili	6	7
Q	(France) Yanis Ghazouani Durand	4	5
Q	(France) M Martineau	4	3
WC	(France) T Faurel	6	6
Q	(Poland) M Kaśnikowski	3	2
(Germany) J Engel	6	6
(Switzerland) M-A Hüsler	6	7^{11}
4	(France) Q Halys	3	6^{9}
8	(United States) M McDonald	6	7
(Tunisia) M Echargui	2	5
(Spain) R Carballés Baena	6	7^{7}
Alt	(Belgium) M Geerts	2	6^{3}
(Estonia) M Lajal	6	4	4
Q	P Kotov	3	6	6
Alt	(Switzerland) R Bertola	7^{7}	6
2/WC	(France) A Mannarino	6^{5}	4

Second round
6	(Georgia (country)) N Basilashvili	3	4
WC	(France) T Faurel	6	6
(Germany) J Engel	6	4	6^{4}
(Switzerland) M-A Hüsler	3	6	7^{7}
8	(United States) M McDonald	6	6
(Spain) R Carballés Baena	4	4
Q	P Kotov	6^{5}	5
Alt	(Switzerland) R Bertola	7^{7}	7

Quarterfinals
WC	(France) T Faurel	3	2
(Switzerland) M-A Hüsler	6	6
8	(United States) M McDonald	1^{r}
Alt	(Switzerland) R Bertola	4

Semifinals
(Switzerland) M-A Hüsler	1	4
Alt	(Switzerland) R Bertola	6	6
