= 2026 Kingston Open =

- Date: 17–22 August
- Edition: 1st
- Surface: Hard
- Location: Kingston, Jamaica

Champions

Singles
- (France) Valentin Royer

Doubles
- (France) Arthur Reymond / (France) Luca Sanchez
- Kingston Open

The 2026 Kingston Open was a professional tennis tournament played on hardcourts. It was the first edition of the tournament which was part of the 2026 ATP Challenger Tour. It took place in Kingston, Jamaica between 17 and 22 August 2026.

== Singles main draw entrants ==
=== Seeds ===
Country	Player	Rank^{1}	Seed
FRA	Valentin Royer	78	1
BRA	Gustavo Heide	133	2
AUT	Joel Schwärzler	150	3
ESP	Pedro Martínez	151	4
BOL	Juan Carlos Prado Ángelo	154	5
EST	Daniil Glinka	160	6
PER	Gonzalo Bueno	178	7
ARG	Lautaro Midón	193	8

- ^{1} Rankings as of 10 August 2026.

=== Other entrants ===
The following players received wildcards into the singles main draw:

- (Jamaica) John Chin
- (Canada) Dan Martin
- (Australia) Max Purcell

The following players received entry into the singles main draw through the Junior Accelerator programme:

- (Brazil) Guto Miguel
- (United States) Benjamin Willwerth

The following players received entry into the singles main draw as alternates:

- (Jamaica) Blaise Bicknell
- (United Kingdom) Paul Jubb
- (United States) Tyler Zink

The following players received entry from the qualifying draw:

- (Brazil) Lucas Andrade da Silva
- (United States) Garrett Johns
- (Japan) Kenta Miyoshi
- (Brazil) Paulo André Saraiva dos Santos
- (Australia) Edward Winter
- (United States) Evan Zhu

== Champions ==
=== Singles ===
- (France) Valentin Royer def. (Spain) Pedro Martínez 6–4, 6–2.

=== Doubles ===
- (France) Arthur Reymond / (France) Luca Sanchez def. (Slovenia) Blaž Kavčič / (Australia) Max Purcell 6–4, 2–6, [12–10].
