= 2026 Open Quimper Bretagne =

- Date: 27 January – 1 February
- Edition: 17th
- Surface: Hard (indoor)
- Location: Quimper, France

Champions

Singles
- (France) Luca Van Assche

Doubles
- (France) Arthur Reymond / (France) Luca Sanchez
- Open Quimper Bretagne

The 2026 Open Quimper Bretagne Occidentale was a professional tennis tournament played on hard courts. It was the 17th edition of the tournament which was part of the 2026 ATP Challenger Tour. It took place in Quimper, France between 27 January and 1 February 2026.

== Singles main-draw entrants ==
=== Seeds ===
Country	Player	Rank^{1}	Seed
USA	Aleksandar Kovacevic	56	1
FRA	Adrian Mannarino	69	2
ESP	Pedro Martínez	71	3
FRA	Quentin Halys	83	4
KAZ	Alexander Shevchenko	97	5
GEO	Nikoloz Basilashvili	105	6
FRA	Benjamin Bonzi	106	7
USA	Mackenzie McDonald	113	8

- ^{1} Rankings are as of 19 January 2026.

=== Other entrants ===
The following players received wildcards into the singles main draw:

- (France) Thomas Faurel
- (France) Adrian Mannarino
- (France) Benoît Paire

The following players received entry into the singles main draw as alternates:

- (Switzerland) Rémy Bertola
- (Belgium) Michael Geerts

The following players received entry from the qualifying draw:

- (Italy) Federico Arnaboldi
- (France) Yanis Ghazouani Durand
- (Poland) Maks Kaśnikowski
- Pavel Kotov
- (France) Laurent Lokoli
- (France) Matteo Martineau

The following player received entry as a lucky loser:

- (Canada) Dan Martin

== Champions ==
=== Singles ===
- (France) Luca Van Assche def. (Switzerland) Rémy Bertola 3–6, 6–1, 7–5.

=== Doubles ===
- (France) Arthur Reymond / (France) Luca Sanchez def. (France) Dan Added / (France) Arthur Bouquier 7–6^{(9–7)}, 3–6, [10–3].
