= Arthur Reymond =

French tennis player

- Country (sports): France
- Born: 2 April 1999 (age 27) Toulouse, France
- Height: 1.80 m (5 ft 11 in)
- Plays: Left-handed (one-handed backhand)
- Coach: Laurent Reymond
- Prize money: US $238,275

Singles
- Career record: 0–0
- Career titles: 2 ITF
- Highest ranking: No. 460 (23 June 2025)
- Current ranking: No. 1,378 (14 September 2026)

Doubles
- Career record: 3–9
- Career titles: 6 Challenger, 8 ITF
- Highest ranking: No. 66 (14 September 2026)
- Current ranking: No. 66 (14 September 2026)

Grand Slam doubles results
- French Open: 2R (2026)
- Wimbledon: 2R (2026)
- US Open: 1R (2026)

Grand Slam mixed doubles results
- French Open: 1R (2026)
- Last updated on: 14 September 2026.

Arthur Reymond (born 2 April 1999) is a French tennis player who plays mostly doubles. He has a career high ATP singles ranking of No. 460 achieved on 23 June 2025 and a career high doubles ranking of No. 66 achieved on 14 September 2026.

== Professional career ==
=== 2023: Maiden Challenger doubles title ===
In July, Reymond won his maiden Challenger doubles title in Braunschweig, Germany, partnering with Pierre-Hugues Herbert.

=== 2024: Two Challenger doubles titles ===
In July, Reymond won two additional Challenger doubles titles, both partnering with Dan Added, in Pozablanco, Spain and in Segovia, Spain.

=== 2025: Two more Challenger titles ===
In July, Reymond reached the doubles final in Segovia, where he was the defending champion, this time partnering with Luca Sanchez. The pair lost in the final to Matías Soto and Federico Zeballos. In August, Reymond won his fourth Challenger title in Grodzisk Mazowiecki, Poland and in October, he won his fifth title in Olbia, Italy.

=== 2026: ATP Tour doubles debut and first win, top 100 ===
In February, Reymond made his ATP Tour debut at the Open Occitanie, partnering with Clément Chidekh. The pair reached the quarterfinal.

== Performance timeline ==
Key
W	F	SF	QF	#R	RR	Q#	DNQ	A	NH

(W) winner; (F) finalist; (SF) semifinalist; (QF) quarterfinalist; (#R) rounds 4, 3, 2, 1; (RR) round-robin stage; (Q#) qualification round; (DNQ) did not qualify; (A) absent; (NH) not held; (SR) strike rate (events won / competed); (W–L) win–loss record.

=== Doubles ===
Tournament	2026	SR	W–L	Win%
Grand Slam tournaments
Australian Open	A	0 / 0	0–0	–
French Open	2R	0 / 1	1–1	50%
Wimbledon	2R	0 / 1	1–1	50%
US Open		0 / 0	0–0	–
Win–loss	2–2	0 / 2	2–2	50%

== ATP Challenger Tour finals ==
=== Doubles: 18 (9 titles, 9 runner-ups) ===
Legend ATP Challenger Tour (9–9)

Result	W–L	Date	Tournament	Surface	Partner	Opponents	Score
Win	1-0	July 2023	Braunschweig, Germany	Clay	(France) Pierre-Hugues Herbert	(India) Rithvik Choudary Bollipalli (India) Arjun Kadhe	7–6^{(9–7)}, 6–4
Win	3-0	July 2024	Pozablanco, Spain	Hard	(France) Dan Added	(United Kingdom) Liam Hignett (United Kingdom) James MacKinlay	6–2, 6–4
Win	3-0	July 2024	Segovia, Spain	Hard	(France) Dan Added	(Bulgaria) Alexander Donski (Portugal) Tiago Pereira	6–4, 6–3
Loss	3-1	July 2025	Segovia, Spain	Hard	(France) Luca Sanchez	(Chile) Matías Soto (Bolivia) Federico Zeballos	6–3, 6–7^{(5–7)}, [14-16]
Win	4–1	Aug 2025	Grodzisk Mazowiecki, Poland	Hard	(Netherlands) Thijmen Loof	(South Korea) Nam Ji-sung (Japan) Takeru Yuzuki	6–4, 6–7^{(3–7)}, [16–14]
Loss	4–2	Aug 2025	Hersonissos III, Greece	Hard	(France) Dan Added	(Italy) Filippo Moroni (United Kingdom) Stuart Parker	4–6, 4–6
Loss	4–3	Sep 2025	Cassis, France	Hard	(France) Luca Sanchez	(Austria) David Pichler (Austria) Jurij Rodionov	6–7^{(2–7)}, 4–6
Win	5–3	Oct 2025	Olbia, Italy	Hard	(France) Luca Sanchez	(Romania) Victor Vlad Cornea (Spain) Bruno Pujol Navarro	6–4, 6–1
Loss	5–4	Jan 2026	Bangalore, India	Hard	(France) Luca Sanchez	(Colombia) Nicolás Barrientos (United States) Benjamin Kittay	6–7^{(9–11)}, 5–7
Win	6–4	Jan 2026	Quimper, France	Hard (i)	(France) Luca Sanchez	(France) Dan Added (France) Arthur Bouquier	7–6^{(9–7)}, 3–6, [10–3]
Loss	6–5	Feb 2026	Saint-Brieuc, France	Hard (i)	(France) Luca Sanchez	(Switzerland) Jakub Paul (Czech Republic) Matěj Vocel	7-6^{(7–4)}, 6-7^{(2–7)}, [5–10]
Loss	6–6	May 2026	Francavilla al Mare, Italy	Clay	(France) Luca Sanchez	(United States) Benjamin Kittay (United States) Ryan Seggerman	4–6, 6–7^{(3–7)}
Loss	6–7	May 2026	Bordeaux, France	Clay	(France) Luca Sanchez	(Czech Republic) Petr Nouza (Austria) Neil Oberleitner	6–7^{(3–7)}, 7–5^{(7–3)}, [6–10]
Loss	6–8	Jul 2026	Braunschweig, Germany	Clay	(France) Luca Sanchez	(Brazil) Orlando Luz (Brazil) Rafael Matos	5–7, 2–6
Loss	6–9	Jul 2026	City of San Marino, San Marino	Clay	(France) Luca Sanchez	(Serbia) Stefan Latinović (Croatia) Mili Poljičak	6–7^{(5–7)}, 3–6
Win	7–9	Aug 2026	Todi, Italy	Clay	(France) Luca Sanchez	(Spain) Mario Mansilla Díez (Spain) Benjamín Winter López	6–2, 6–4
Win	8–9	Aug 2026	Kingston, Jamaica	Hard	(France) Luca Sanchez	(Slovenia) Blaž Kavčič (Australia) Max Purcell	6–4, 2–6, [12–10]
Win	9–9	Aug 2026	Kingston, Jamaica	Hard	(France) Luca Sanchez	(Bulgaria) Alexander Donski (Canada) Dan Martin	6–2, 6–4
