= 2026 Open Quimper Bretagne – Doubles =

Doubles
- 2026 Open Quimper Bretagne

Final
- Champions: (France) Arthur Reymond (France) Luca Sanchez
- Runners-up: (France) Dan Added (France) Arthur Bouquier
- Score: 7–6^{(9–7)}, 3–6, [10–3]

Events
Singles	Doubles
- Open Quimper Bretagne

Sadio Doumbia and Fabien Reboul were the defending champions but chose not to defend their title.

Arthur Reymond and Luca Sanchez won the title after defeating Dan Added and Arthur Bouquier 7–6^{(9–7)}, 3–6, [10–3] in the final.

== Seeds ==
1. (Ukraine) Denys Molchanov / (Austria) David Pichler (quarterfinals)
2. (France) Arthur Reymond / (France) Luca Sanchez (champions)
3. (Colombia) Nicolás Barrientos / (United States) Benjamin Kittay (first round)
4. (United States) Nathaniel Lammons / (United States) Jackson Withrow (semifinals)

== Draw ==
Key

- Q = Qualifier
- WC = Wild card
- LL = Lucky loser
- Alt = Alternate
- ITF = ITF entry
- PR = Protected ranking
- SR = Special ranking
- SE = Special exempt
- JE = Junior exempt
- JR = Junior Accelerator Programme entrant
- CO = College Accelerator Programme entrant
- NG = Next Gen Accelerator Program entrant
- w/o = Walkover
- r = Retired
- d = Defaulted

First round
1	(Ukraine) D Molchanov (Austria) D Pichler	6	3	[10]
(Netherlands) M Hermans (Spain) S Martos Gornés	4	6	[3]
WC	(France) Maxence Beaugé (Ivory Coast) E Coulibaly	1	7	[10]
(Switzerland) R Bertola (Tunisia) M Echargui	6	5	[8]
3	(Colombia) N Barrientos (United States) B Kittay	5	3
(United Kingdom) B Harris (Spain) D Vega Hernández	7	6
(Slovakia) N Gombos (Slovakia) A Molčan	6	5	[7]
WC	(France) D Added (France) A Bouquier	4	7	[10]
(Spain) A Barroso Campos (Spain) R Carballés Baena	7^{9}	6
(Belgium) M Geerts (Germany) T Rühl	6^{7}	1
I Liutarevich (Czech Republic) D Poljak	2	7^{7}	[7]
4	(United States) N Lammons (United States) J Withrow	6	6^{4}	[10]
Alt	(France) Yanis Ghazouani Durand (France) Arthur Nagel
(Peru) A Merino (Germany) C Negritu	w/o
(Spain) M Mansilla Díez (Spain) B Pujol Navarro	6^{4}	6^{8}
2	(France) A Reymond (France) L Sanchez	7^{7}	7^{10}

Quarterfinals
1	(Ukraine) D Molchanov (Austria) D Pichler	6	6^{5}	[8]
WC	(France) M Beaugé (Ivory Coast) E Coulibaly	4	7^{7}	[10]
(United Kingdom) B Harris (Spain) D Vega Hernández	6^{8}	3
WC	(France) D Added (France) A Bouquier	7^{10}	6
(Spain) A Barroso Campos (Spain) R Carballés Baena
4	(United States) N Lammons (United States) J Withrow	w/o
(Peru) A Merino (Germany) C Negritu	6^{7}	7^{7}	[8]
2	(France) A Reymond (France) L Sanchez	7^{9}	6^{4}	[10]

Semifinals
WC	(France) M Beaugé (Ivory Coast) E Coulibaly	4	4
WC	(France) D Added (France) A Bouquier	6	6
4	(United States) N Lammons (United States) J Withrow	3	7^{9}	[9]
2	(France) A Reymond (France) L Sanchez	6	6^{7}	[11]

Final
WC	(France) D Added (France) A Bouquier	6^{7}	6	[3]
2	(France) A Reymond (France) L Sanchez	7^{9}	3	[10]
