= 2024 US Open – Women's singles =

Tennis championship

Women's singles
- 2024 US Open

Final
- Champion: Aryna Sabalenka
- Runner-up: (United States) Jessica Pegula
- Score: 7–5, 7–5

Details
- Draw: 128 (16Q / 8WC)
- Seeds: 32

Events
Singles	men	women		boys	girls
Doubles	men	women	mixed	boys	girls
WC Singles	men	women	quad	boys	girls
WC Doubles	men	women	quad	boys	girls

Qualification
Singles	men	women
- US Open

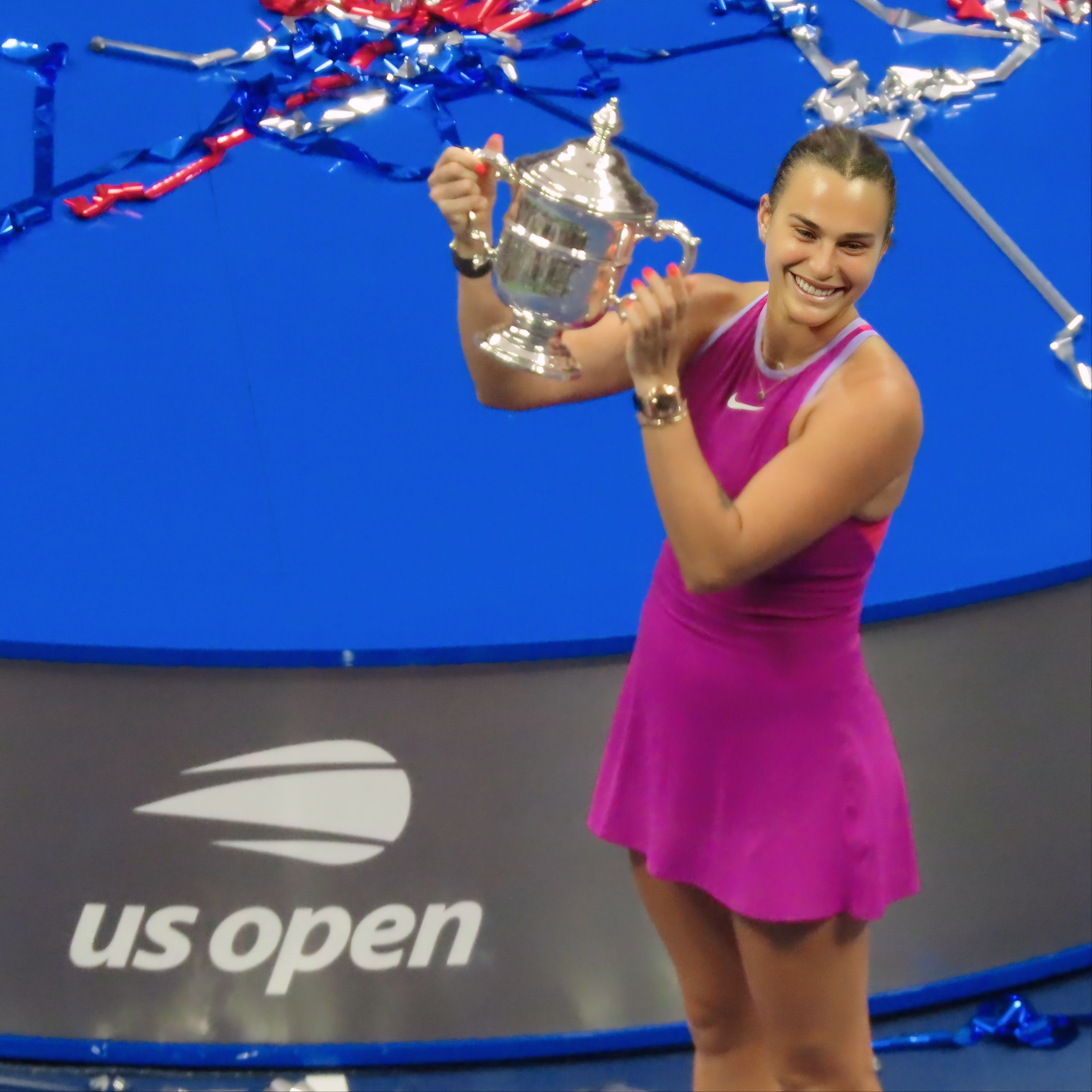
Sabalenka lifting the 2024 US Open singles trophy

Aryna Sabalenka defeated Jessica Pegula in the final, 7–5, 7–5 to win the women's singles tennis title at the 2024 US Open. It was her first US Open singles title and third major singles title overall. Sabalenka was the fifth woman to win both hardcourt majors in the same year (having also won the Australian Open) since the feat became achievable in 1988, after Steffi Graf, Monica Seles, Martina Hingis and Angelique Kerber. The final was a rematch of the Cincinnati final three weeks earlier, in which Sabalenka also prevailed.

Coco Gauff was the defending champion, but lost in the fourth round to Emma Navarro.

This edition of the US Open had two of the three latest finishes in the history of the tournament. The third-round match between Sabalenka and Ekaterina Alexandrova (which also set the record for the latest start in the history of the tournament beginning at 12:08 AM) was tied for the third-latest finish for a women's singles match at 1:48 AM. The fourth round match between Zheng Qinwen and Donna Vekić set the new record for the latest finish of a US Open's women's match at 2:15 AM.

== Seeds ==
1. (Poland) Iga Świątek (quarterfinals)
2. Aryna Sabalenka (champion)
3. (United States) Coco Gauff (fourth round)
4. (Kazakhstan) Elena Rybakina (second round, withdrew)
5. (Italy) Jasmine Paolini (fourth round)
6. (United States) Jessica Pegula (final)
7. (China) Zheng Qinwen (quarterfinals)
8. (Czech Republic) Barbora Krejčíková (second round)
9. (Greece) Maria Sakkari (first round, retired)
10. (Latvia) Jeļena Ostapenko (first round)
11. (United States) Danielle Collins (first round)
12. Daria Kasatkina (second round)
13. (United States) Emma Navarro (semifinals)
14. (United States) Madison Keys (third round)
15. Anna Kalinskaya (third round)
16. Liudmila Samsonova (fourth round)
17. (Tunisia) Ons Jabeur (withdrew)
18. Diana Shnaider (fourth round)
19. (Ukraine) Marta Kostyuk (third round)
20. Victoria Azarenka (third round)
21. Mirra Andreeva (second round)
22. (Brazil) Beatriz Haddad Maia (quarterfinals)
23. (Canada) Leylah Fernandez (first round)
24. (Croatia) Donna Vekić (fourth round)
25. Anastasia Pavlyuchenkova (third round)
26. (Spain) Paula Badosa (quarterfinals)
27. (Ukraine) Elina Svitolina (third round)
28. (France) Caroline Garcia (first round)
29. Ekaterina Alexandrova (third round)
30. (Kazakhstan) Yulia Putintseva (third round)
31. (United Kingdom) Katie Boulter (second round)
32. (Ukraine) Dayana Yastremska (first round)
33. (Belgium) Elise Mertens (fourth round)

== Draw ==
Key

- Q = Qualifier
- WC = Wild card
- LL = Lucky loser
- Alt = Alternate
- ITF = ITF entry
- PR = Protected ranking
- SR = Special ranking
- SE = Special exempt
- JE = Junior exempt
- JR = Junior Accelerator Programme entrant
- CO = College Accelerator Programme entrant
- NG = Next Gen Accelerator Program entrant
- w/o = Walkover
- r = Retired
- d = Defaulted

=== Finals ===
Quarterfinals
1	(Poland) Iga Świątek	2	4
6	(United States) Jessica Pegula	6	6
22	(Brazil) Beatriz Haddad Maia	1	4
(Czech Republic) Karolína Muchová	6	6
26	(Spain) Paula Badosa	2	5
13	(United States) Emma Navarro	6	7
7	(China) Zheng Qinwen	1	2
2	Aryna Sabalenka	6	6

Semifinals
6	(United States) Jessica Pegula	1	6	6
(Czech Republic) Karolína Muchová	6	4	2
13	(United States) Emma Navarro	3	6^{2}
2	Aryna Sabalenka	6	7^{7}

Final
6	(United States) Jessica Pegula	5	5
2	Aryna Sabalenka	7	7

=== Top half ===
==== Section 1 ====
First round
1	(Poland) I Świątek	6	7^{8}
LL	K Rakhimova	4	6^{6}
(Australia) D Saville	3	6	6^{6}
Q	(Japan) E Shibahara	6	4	7^{10}
(Italy) E Cocciaretto	6	6
PR	(Ukraine) K Baindl	3	0
WC	(Australia) T Preston	2	0
25	A Pavlyuchenkova	6	6
21	M Andreeva	6	7^{7}
(Colombia) C Osorio	2	6^{4}
PR	(China) S Zhang	6	1	5
(United States) A Krueger	0	6	7
Q	(Germany) E Lys	2	6	5
(Czech Republic) M Bouzková	6	1	7
PR	(China) Q Wang	2	5
16	L Samsonova	6	7

Second round
1	(Poland) I Świątek	6	6
Q	(Japan) E Shibahara	0	1
(Italy) E Cocciaretto	7	1	2
25	A Pavlyuchenkova	5	6	6
21	M Andreeva	1	4
(United States) A Krueger	6	6
(Czech Republic) M Bouzková	6	6^{1}	3
16	L Samsonova	3	7^{7}	6

Third round
1	(Poland) I Świątek	6	6
25	A Pavlyuchenkova	4	2
(United States) A Krueger	1	1
16	L Samsonova	6	6

Fourth round
1	(Poland) I Świątek	6	6
16	L Samsonova	4	1

==== Section 2 ====
First round
11	(United States) D Collins	6	5	4
(United States) C Dolehide	1	7	6
(Spain) C Bucșa	6	0	4
(Italy) S Errani	3	6	6
(Slovakia) AK Schmiedlová	6	6^{5}	2
(Denmark) C Tauson	1	7^{7}	6
(Argentina) N Podoroska	0	1
18	D Shnaider	6	6
31	(United Kingdom) K Boulter	5	6	6
Q	A Sasnovich	7	2	1
(Spain) J Bouzas Maneiro	6	6
(Croatia) P Martić	3	0
(United Kingdom) E Raducanu	1	6	4
(United States) S Kenin	6	3	6
PR	(United States) S Rogers	4	3
6	(United States) J Pegula	6	6

Second round
(United States) C Dolehide	5	5
(Italy) S Errani	7	7
(Denmark) C Tauson	4	4
18	D Shnaider	6	6
31	(United Kingdom) K Boulter	5	5
(Spain) J Bouzas Maneiro	7	7
(United States) S Kenin	6^{4}	3
6	(United States) J Pegula	7^{7}	6

Third round
(Italy) S Errani	2	2
18	D Shnaider	6	6
(Spain) J Bouzas Maneiro	3	3
6	(United States) J Pegula	6	6

Fourth round
18	D Shnaider	4	2
6	(United States) J Pegula	6	6

==== Section 3 ====
First round
4	(Kazakhstan) E Rybakina	6	7^{7}
Q	(Australia) D Aiava	1	6^{1}
Q	(France) J Ponchet	6	6
PR	(China) S Zheng	4	1
(Denmark) C Wozniacki	6	6
Q	(Japan) N Hibino	0	1
(Mexico) R Zarazúa	6	6
28	(France) C Garcia	1	4
22	(Brazil) B Haddad Maia	4	6	6
(Armenia) E Avanesyan	6	0	2
(Spain) S Sorribes Tormo	6	6
WC	(United States) A Noel	1	3
(Hungary) A Bondár	6	3	6
(United States) B Pera	3	6	3
PR	(United States) L Davis	2	2
15	A Kalinskaya	6	6

Second round
4	(Kazakhstan) E Rybakina
Q	(France) J Ponchet	w/o
(Denmark) C Wozniacki	6	6
(Mexico) R Zarazúa	3	3
22	(Brazil) B Haddad Maia	6	6
(Spain) S Sorribes Tormo	2	1
(Hungary) A Bondár	2	4
15	A Kalinskaya	6	6

Third round
Q	(France) J Ponchet	3	2
(Denmark) C Wozniacki	6	6
22	(Brazil) B Haddad Maia	6	6
15	A Kalinskaya	3	1

Fourth round
(Denmark) C Wozniacki	2	6	3
22	(Brazil) B Haddad Maia	6	3	6

==== Section 4 ====
First round
10	(Latvia) J Ostapenko	3	2
WC	(Japan) N Osaka	6	6
(Czech Republic) K Muchová	6	7
(United States) K Volynets	3	5
(Czech Republic) B Fruhvirtová	1^{r}
Q	(United States) V Lepchenko	2
A Potapova	2	6	7
23	(Canada) L Fernandez	6	4	5
30	(Kazakhstan) Y Putintseva	7^{7}	6
(Czech Republic) L Nosková	6^{3}	4
(China) Xin Wang	3	6	6
Q	(Australia) Ar Rodionova	6	4	1
(Egypt) M Sherif	3	6	5
(Czech Republic) Ka Plíšková	6	0	7
WC	(Canada) B Andreescu	7^{7}	2	4
5	(Italy) J Paolini	6^{5}	6	6

Second round
WC	(Japan) N Osaka	3	6^{5}
(Czech Republic) K Muchová	6	7^{7}
Q	(United States) V Lepchenko	3	4
A Potapova	6	6
30	(Kazakhstan) Y Putintseva	6	7^{7}
(China) Xin Wang	1	6^{4}
(Czech Republic) Ka Plíšková	0^{r}
5	(Italy) J Paolini	0

Third round
(Czech Republic) K Muchová	6	6
A Potapova	4	2
30	(Kazakhstan) Y Putintseva	3	4
5	(Italy) J Paolini	6	6

Fourth round
(Czech Republic) K Muchová	6	6
5	(Italy) J Paolini	3	3

=== Bottom half ===
==== Section 5 ====
First round
8	(Czech Republic) B Krejčíková	7^{7}	6
Q	(Spain) M Bassols Ribera	6^{3}	2
PR	(Austria) J Grabher	2	4
Q	(Romania) E-G Ruse	6	6
(Italy) M Trevisan	2	5
(United States) T Townsend	6	7
(Switzerland) V Golubic	0	3
26	(Spain) P Badosa	6	6
20	V Azarenka	3	6	6
Q	(Ukraine) Y Starodubtseva	6	1	1
(France) C Burel	0	7	7
(United States) S Stephens	6	5	5
(France) D Parry	7^{7}	7^{7}
(China) Xiy Wang	6^{2}	6^{5}
(China) Y Wang	6	0
9	(Greece) M Sakkari	2	0^{r}

Second round
8	(Czech Republic) B Krejčíková	4	5
Q	(Romania) E-G Ruse	6	7
(United States) T Townsend	3	5
26	(Spain) P Badosa	6	7
20	V Azarenka	6	6
(France) C Burel	1	4
(France) D Parry	0	4
(China) Y Wang	6	6

Third round
Q	(Romania) E-G Ruse	6	1	6^{8}
26	(Spain) P Badosa	4	6	7^{10}
20	V Azarenka	4	6	1
(China) Y Wang	6	3	6

Fourth round
26	(Spain) P Badosa	6	6
(China) Y Wang	1	2

==== Section 6 ====
First round
13	(United States) E Navarro	6	6
A Blinkova	1	1
(Romania) A Bogdan	4	6^{5}
(Netherlands) A Rus	6	7^{7}
WC	(France) C Paquet	1	2
(United Kingdom) H Dart	6	6
WC	(United States) M Kessler	2	3
19	(Ukraine) M Kostyuk	6	6
27	(Ukraine) E Svitolina	3	6	6
(Argentina) ML Carlé	6	3	4
(France) O Dodin	1	6	1
(Ukraine) A Kalinina	6	3	6
(Germany) T Maria	6	6
Q	(Argentina) S Sierra	2	3
(France) V Gracheva	2	0
3	(United States) C Gauff	6	6

Second round
13	(United States) E Navarro	6	6
(Netherlands) A Rus	1	1
(United Kingdom) H Dart	6^{10}	1
19	(Ukraine) M Kostyuk	7^{12}	6
27	(Ukraine) E Svitolina	6	6
(Ukraine) A Kalinina	1	2
(Germany) T Maria	4	0
3	(United States) C Gauff	6	6

Third round
13	(United States) E Navarro	6	4	6
19	(Ukraine) M Kostyuk	4	6	3
27	(Ukraine) E Svitolina	6	3	3
3	(United States) C Gauff	3	6	6

Fourth round
13	(United States) E Navarro	6	4	6
3	(United States) C Gauff	3	6	3

==== Section 7 ====
First round
7	(China) Q Zheng	4	6	6
WC	(United States) A Anisimova	6	4	2
E Andreeva	6	7^{9}
(China) Y Yuan	3	6^{7}
(Germany) T Korpatsch	6	3	4
(Japan) M Uchijima	3	6	6
(Germany) J Niemeier	6	6^{3}	6
32	(Ukraine) D Yastremska	4	7^{7}	4
24	(Croatia) D Vekić	6	6
Q	(Australia) K Birrell	4	4
(Belgium) G Minnen	7	7
(Poland) M Fręch	5	5
(United States) P Stearns	6	7
(Ukraine) L Tsurenko	1	5
(Romania) J Cristian	2	4
12	D Kasatkina	6	6

Second round
7	(China) Q Zheng	6^{3}	6	6
E Andreeva	7^{7}	1	2
(Japan) M Uchijima	4	0
(Germany) J Niemeier	6	6
24	(Croatia) D Vekić	7	6
(Belgium) G Minnen	5	1
(United States) P Stearns	6	7^{7}
12	D Kasatkina	1	6^{3}

Third round
7	(China) Q Zheng	6	6
(Germany) J Niemeier	2	1
24	(Croatia) D Vekić	7	6
(United States) P Stearns	5	4

Fourth round
7	(China) Q Zheng	7^{7}	4	6
24	(Croatia) D Vekić	6^{2}	6	2

==== Section 8 ====
First round
14	(United States) M Keys	6	6
(Czech Republic) K Siniaková	4	1
Q	(Australia) M Joint	6	7
(Germany) L Siegemund	4	5
PR	(Australia) A Tomljanović	6	6
Q	(United States) A Li	4	4
V Kudermetova	6	4	3
33	(Belgium) E Mertens	3	6	6
29	E Alexandrova	6^{4}	6	7
(Bulgaria) V Tomova	7^{7}	0	5
(Poland) M Linette	4	3
WC	(United States) I Jovic	6	6
(New Zealand) L Sun	3	0^{r}
(Italy) L Bronzetti	6	0
Q	(Australia) P Hon	3	3
2	A Sabalenka	6	6

Second round
14	(United States) M Keys	6	6
Q	(Australia) M Joint	4	0
PR	(Australia) A Tomljanović	3	2
33	(Belgium) E Mertens	6	6
29	E Alexandrova	4	6	7
WC	(United States) I Jovic	6	4	5
(Italy) L Bronzetti	3	1
2	A Sabalenka	6	6

Third round
14	(United States) M Keys	7^{7}	5	4
33	(Belgium) E Mertens	6^{5}	7	6
29	E Alexandrova	6	1	2
2	A Sabalenka	2	6	6

Fourth round
33	(Belgium) E Mertens	2	4
2	A Sabalenka	6	6

== Championship match statistics ==
Category	Sabalenka	(United States) Pegula
1st serve %	49/82 (60%)	57/85 (67%)
1st serve points won	32 of 49 = 65%	37 of 57 = 65%
2nd serve points won	14 of 33 = 42%	6 of 28 = 21%
Total service points won	46 of 82 = 56.10%	43 of 85 = 50.59%
Aces	6	4
Double faults	5	4
Winners	40	17
Unforced errors	34	22
Net points won	18 of 23 = 78%	5 of 14 = 36%
Break points converted	6 of 15 = 40%	4 of 7 = 57%
Return points won	42 of 85 = 49%	36 of 82 = 44%
Total points won	88	79

== Seeded players ==
The following are the seeded players. Seedings are based on WTA rankings as of August 19, 2024. Rankings and points before are as of August 26, 2024.

Seed	Rank	Player	Points before	Points defending	Points won	Points after	Status
1	1	(Poland) Iga Świątek	10,695	240	430	10,885	Quarterfinals lost to (United States) Jessica Pegula [6]
2	2	Aryna Sabalenka	8,016	1,300	2,000	8,716	Champion, defeated (United States) Jessica Pegula [6]
3	3	(United States) Coco Gauff	6,743	2,000	240	4,983	Fourth round lost to (United States) Emma Navarro [13]
4	4	(Kazakhstan) Elena Rybakina	5,931	130	70	5,871	Second round withdrew due to lower back injury
5	5	(Italy) Jasmine Paolini	5,168	10	240	5,398	Fourth round lost to (Czech Republic) Karolína Muchová
6	6	(United States) Jessica Pegula	5,160	240	1,300	6,220	Runner-up, lost to Aryna Sabalenka [2]
7	7	(China) Zheng Qinwen	3,980	430	430	3,980	Quarterfinals lost to Aryna Sabalenka [2]
8	8	(Czech Republic) Barbora Krejčíková	3,571	10	70	3,631	Second round lost to (Romania) Elena-Gabriela Ruse [Q]
9	9	(Greece) Maria Sakkari	3,515	10	10	3,515	First round retired against (China) Wang Yafan
10	10	(Latvia) Jeļena Ostapenko	3,428	430	10	3,008	First round lost to (Japan) Naomi Osaka [WC]
11	11	(United States) Danielle Collins	3,422	70	10	3,362	First round lost to (United States) Caroline Dolehide
12	13	Daria Kasatkina	2,973	240	70	2,803	Second round lost to (United States) Peyton Stearns
13	12	(United States) Emma Navarro	3,040	10	780	3,810	Semifinals lost to Aryna Sabalenka [2]
14	14	(United States) Madison Keys	2,727	780	130	2,077	Third round lost to (Belgium) Elise Mertens [33]
15	15	Anna Kalinskaya	2,712	70	130	2,772	Third round lost to (Brazil) Beatriz Haddad Maia [22]
16	16	Liudmila Samsonova	2,610	130	240	2,720	Fourth round lost to (Poland) Iga Świątek [1]
17	17	(Tunisia) Ons Jabeur	2,451	240	0	2,211	Withdrew due to shoulder injury
18	18	Diana Shnaider	2,385	(54)^{†}	240	2,571	Fourth round lost to (United States) Jessica Pegula [6]
19	19	(Ukraine) Marta Kostyuk	2,348	10	130	2,468	Third round lost to (United States) Emma Navarro [13]
20	20	Victoria Azarenka	2,266	70	130	2,326	Third round lost to (China) Wang Yafan
21	23	Mirra Andreeva	2,153	70	70	2,153	Second round lost to (United States) Ashlyn Krueger
22	21	(Brazil) Beatriz Haddad Maia	2,221	70	430	2,581	Quarterfinals lost to (Czech Republic) Karolína Muchová
23	26	(Canada) Leylah Fernandez	2,009	10	10	2,009	First round lost to Anastasia Potapova
24	24	(Croatia) Donna Vekić	2,013	10	240	2,243	Fourth round lost to (China) Zheng Qinwen [7]
25	27	Anastasia Pavlyuchenkova	1,961	70	130	2,021	Third round lost to (Poland) Iga Świątek [1]
26	29	(Spain) Paula Badosa	1,895	0	430	2,325	Quarterfinals lost to (United States) Emma Navarro [13]
27	28	(Ukraine) Elina Svitolina	1,942	130	130	1,942	Third round lost to (United States) Coco Gauff [3]
28	30	(France) Caroline Garcia	1,808	10	10	1,808	First round lost to (Mexico) Renata Zarazúa
29	31	Ekaterina Alexandrova	1,778	130	130	1,778	Third round lost to Aryna Sabalenka [2]
30	32	(Kazakhstan) Yulia Putintseva	1,761	10	130	1,881	Third round lost to (Italy) Jasmine Paolini [5]
31	33	(United Kingdom) Katie Boulter	1,715	130	70	1,655	Second round lost to (Spain) Jéssica Bouzas Maneiro
32	34	(Ukraine) Dayana Yastremska	1,682	30	10	1,662	First round lost to (Germany) Jule Niemeier
33	35	(Belgium) Elise Mertens	1,639	130	240	1,749	Fourth round lost to Aryna Sabalenka [2]

† The player did not qualify for the tournament in 2023. Points from her 18th best result will be deducted instead.

=== Withdrawn players ===
The following players would have been seeded, but withdrew before the tournament began.

Rank	Player	Points before	Points defending	Points after	Withdrawal reason
22	(Czech Republic) Markéta Vondroušová	2,178	430	1,748	Hand injury

== Other entry information ==
=== Wild cards ===
- (Canada) Bianca Andreescu
- (United States) Amanda Anisimova
- (United States) Iva Jovic
- (United States) McCartney Kessler
- (United States) Alexa Noel
- (Japan) Naomi Osaka
- (France) Chloé Paquet
- (Australia) Taylah Preston

=== Protected ranking ===
- (Australia) Ajla Tomljanović (33)
- (China) Zhang Shuai (48)
- (United States) Shelby Rogers (51)
- (United States) Lauren Davis (59)
- (Austria) Julia Grabher (73)
- (Ukraine) Kateryna Baindl (86)
- (China) Zheng Saisai (89)
- (China) Wang Qiang (94)

=== Qualifiers ===
- (Australia) Destanee Aiava
- (Spain) Marina Bassols Ribera
- (Australia) Kimberly Birrell
- (Japan) Nao Hibino
- (Australia) Priscilla Hon
- (Australia) Maya Joint
- (United States) Varvara Lepchenko
- (United States) Ann Li
- (Germany) Eva Lys
- (France) Jessika Ponchet
- (Australia) Arina Rodionova
- (Romania) Elena-Gabriela Ruse
- Aliaksandra Sasnovich
- (Japan) Ena Shibahara
- (Argentina) Solana Sierra
- (Ukraine) Yuliia Starodubtseva

=== Lucky Loser ===
- Kamilla Rakhimova

=== Withdrawals ===
The entry list was released based on the WTA rankings for the week of July 15, 2024.

- ‡ (Romania) Sorana Cîrstea (37) → replaced by (Mexico) Renata Zarazúa (97)
- ‡ (China) Zhu Lin (50) → replaced by (Hungary) Anna Bondár (98)
- ‡ (Czech Republic) Markéta Vondroušová (18) → replaced by (Croatia) Petra Martić (99)
- § (Tunisia) Ons Jabeur (16) → replaced by Kamilla Rakhimova (LL)

‡ – withdrew from entry list
§ – withdrew from main draw

Preceded by 2024 Wimbledon Championships – Women's singles	Grand Slam women's singles	Succeeded by 2025 Australian Open – Women's singles
