= Kingston Open =

- 2026 Kingston Open

ATP Challenger Tour
- Location: Kingston, Jamaica
- Category: ATP Challenger Tour
- Surface: Hard

The Kingston Open is a professional tennis tournament played on hardcourts. It is currently part of the ATP Challenger Tour. It was first held in Kingston, Jamaica in 2026 in two editions.

== Past finals ==
=== Singles ===
Year	Champion	Runner-up	Score
2026 (1)	(France) Valentin Royer	(Spain) Pedro Martínez	6–4, 6–2
2026 (2)	(United States) Aidan Mayo	(Ecuador) Andy Andrade	6–3, 7–6^{(9–7)}

=== Doubles ===
Year	Champions	Runners-up	Score
2026 (1)	(France) Arthur Reymond (France) Luca Sanchez	(Slovenia) Blaž Kavčič (Australia) Max Purcell	6–4, 2–6, [12–10]
2026 (2)	(France) Arthur Reymond (France) Luca Sanchez	(Bulgaria) Alexander Donski (Canada) Dan Martin	6–2, 6–4
