= Aidan Mayo =

American tennis player (born 2003)

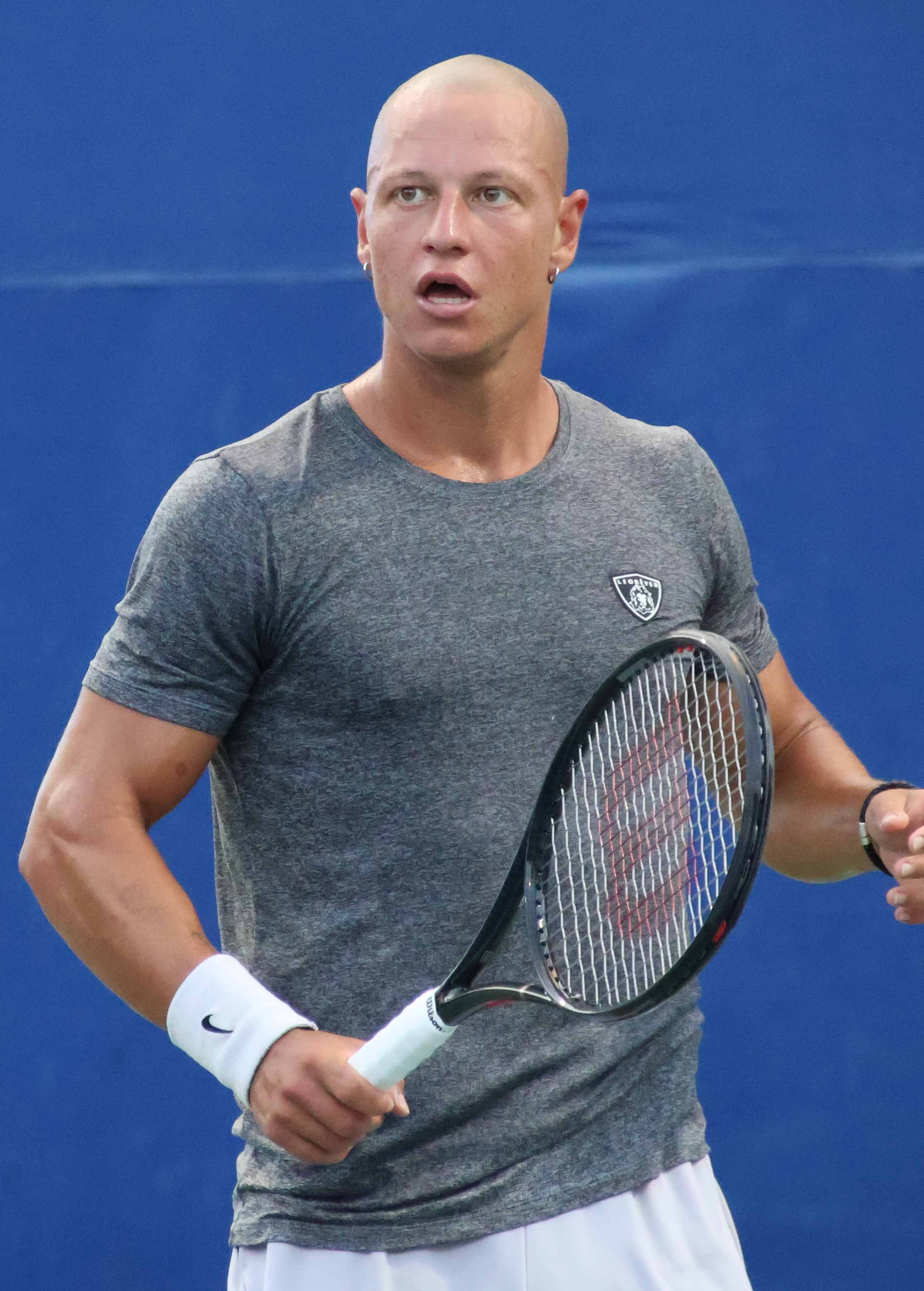
- Mayo in 2026
- Country (sports): United States
- Born: 14 May 2003 (age 23) Sacramento, California, US
- Height: 6 ft 0 in (1.83 m)
- Plays: Right-handed (One-handed backhand; occasionally two-handed)
- Prize money: US $304,834

Singles
- Career record: 0–1
- Highest ranking: No. 235 (November 9, 2026)
- Current ranking: No. 235 (November 9, 2026)

Doubles
- Career record: 0–0
- Highest ranking: No. 1,045 (August 8, 2022)
- Last updated on: November 9, 2026.

Aidan Mayo (born May 14, 2003) is an American tennis player. He has a career high singles ranking of No. 235 achieved on November 9, 2026.

== Early and personal life ==
Mayo is from Roseville in the Sacramento area. His brother Keenan also played as a junior tennis player. They trained as junior players at the USTA Training Center West in Carson, California.

== Career ==
Mayo reached the final of the Challenger in Charlottesville in November 2023, losing to Kazakhstan's Beibit Zhukayev in straight sets.

He faced twelfth seed Mattia Bellucci of Italy in the first round of qualifying for the 2024 US Open. He won the Challenger de Drummondville in November 2024, defeating Chris Rodesch of Luxembourg in the final.

Entering as a lucky loser, Mayo won his second ATP Challenger singles title at the 2026 Kingston Open II, defeating Andy Andrade in the final.
