= 2024 US Open – Men's singles =

Tennis championship

Men's singles
- 2024 US Open

Final
- Champion: (Italy) Jannik Sinner
- Runner-up: (United States) Taylor Fritz
- Score: 6–3, 6–4, 7–5
- Date: September 8, 2024

Details
- Draw: 128 (16Q / 8WC)
- Seeds: 32

Events
Singles	men	women		boys	girls
Doubles	men	women	mixed	boys	girls
WC Singles	men	women	quad	boys	girls
WC Doubles	men	women	quad	boys	girls

Qualification
Singles	men	women
- US Open

Jannik Sinner defeated Taylor Fritz in the final, 6–3, 6–4, 7–5 to win the men's singles tennis title at the 2024 US Open. It was his second major title. Sinner was the fourth man to win both hardcourt singles majors (Australian Open and US Open) in the same year, after Mats Wilander, Roger Federer and Novak Djokovic, and the first to win his first two major singles titles in the same year since Guillermo Vilas in 1977.

Djokovic was the defending champion, but lost in the third round to Alexei Popyrin. This marked Djokovic's earliest defeat at the US Open since 2006, and earliest defeat at any major since the 2017 Australian Open. It was the first year since 2017 that Djokovic did not win a major, the first year since 2002 that none of the Big Three won a major, and the first major since the 2004 French Open without any of the Big Three in the round of 16.

The semifinal between Fritz and Frances Tiafoe marked the first all-American major men's semifinal since Andre Agassi defeated Robby Ginepri at the 2005 US Open, with Fritz becoming the first American man to reach a major final since Andy Roddick at the 2009 Wimbledon Championships, and the first to do so at the US Open since Roddick in 2006.

This tournament marked the final major appearance of 2020 champion and former world No. 3 Dominic Thiem. He lost in the first round to Ben Shelton.

The first-round match between Dan Evans and Karen Khachanov was the longest match in the tournament's history at 5 hours and 35 minutes, surpassing the previous record of 5 hours and 26 minutes from the 1992 semifinal between Stefan Edberg and Michael Chang.

== Seeds ==
1. (Italy) Jannik Sinner (champion)
2. (Serbia) Novak Djokovic (third round)
3. (Spain) Carlos Alcaraz (second round)
4. (Germany) Alexander Zverev (quarterfinals)
5. Daniil Medvedev (quarterfinals)
6. Andrey Rublev (fourth round)
7. (Poland) Hubert Hurkacz (second round)
8. (Norway) Casper Ruud (fourth round)
9. (Bulgaria) Grigor Dimitrov (quarterfinals, retired)
10. (Australia) Alex de Minaur (quarterfinals)
11. (Greece) Stefanos Tsitsipas (first round)
12. (United States) Taylor Fritz (final)
13. (United States) Ben Shelton (third round)
14. (United States) Tommy Paul (fourth round)
15. (Denmark) Holger Rune (first round)
16. (United States) Sebastian Korda (second round)
17. (France) Ugo Humbert (second round)
18. (Italy) Lorenzo Musetti (third round)
19. (Canada) Félix Auger-Aliassime (first round)
20. (United States) Frances Tiafoe (semifinals)
21. (Argentina) Sebastián Báez (second round, retired)
22. (Chile) Alejandro Tabilo (first round)
23. Karen Khachanov (first round)
24. (France) Arthur Fils (second round)
25. (United Kingdom) Jack Draper (semifinals)
26. (Chile) Nicolás Jarry (first round)
27. (Kazakhstan) Alexander Bublik (first round)
28. (Australia) Alexei Popyrin (fourth round)
29. (Argentina) Francisco Cerúndolo (second round)
30. (Italy) Matteo Arnaldi (third round)
31. (Italy) Flavio Cobolli (third round)
32. (Czech Republic) Jiří Lehečka (third round)

== Draw ==
Key

- Q = Qualifier
- WC = Wild card
- LL = Lucky loser
- Alt = Alternate
- ITF = ITF entry
- PR = Protected ranking
- SR = Special ranking
- SE = Special exempt
- JE = Junior exempt
- JR = Junior Accelerator Programme entrant
- CO = College Accelerator Programme entrant
- NG = Next Gen Accelerator Program entrant
- w/o = Walkover
- r = Retired
- d = Defaulted

=== Finals ===
Quarterfinals
1	(Italy) Jannik Sinner	6	1	6	6
5	Daniil Medvedev	2	6	1	4
25	(United Kingdom) Jack Draper	6	7	6
10	(Australia) Alex de Minaur	3	5	2
12	(United States) Taylor Fritz	7^{7}	3	6	7^{7}
4	(Germany) Alexander Zverev	6^{2}	6	4	6^{3}
9	(Bulgaria) Grigor Dimitrov	3	7^{7}	3	1^{r}
20	(United States) Frances Tiafoe	6	6^{5}	6	4

Semifinals
1	(Italy) Jannik Sinner	7	7^{7}	6
25	(United Kingdom) Jack Draper	5	6^{3}	2
12	(United States) Taylor Fritz	4	7	4	6	6
20	(United States) Frances Tiafoe	6	5	6	4	1

Final
1	(Italy) Jannik Sinner	6	6	7
12	(United States) Taylor Fritz	3	4	5

=== Top half ===
==== Section 1 ====
First round
1	(Italy) J Sinner	2	6	6	6
(United States) M McDonald	6	2	1	2
Q	(United States) E Spizzirri	1	5	3
(United States) A Michelsen	6	7	6
Q	(Italy) M Bellucci	6	7^{7}	6
WC	(Switzerland) S Wawrinka	4	6^{5}	3
(Australia) C O'Connell	6	6	4	6
26	(Chile) N Jarry	4	3	6	3
24	(France) A Fils	6	3	6	6
WC	(United States) L Tien	4	6	1	2
(Spain) J Munar	4	6	3	5
Q	(Canada) G Diallo	6	3	6	7
(Australia) M Purcell	7	6	6
(Australia) A Vukic	5	4	3
(Italy) L Sonego	4	2	7	2
14	(United States) T Paul	6	6	5	6

Second round
1	(Italy) J Sinner	6	6	6
(United States) A Michelsen	4	0	2
Q	(Italy) M Bellucci	3	4	6	3
(Australia) C O'Connell	6	6	3	6
24	(France) A Fils	5	7^{7}	4	4
Q	(Canada) G Diallo	7	6^{3}	6	6
(Australia) M Purcell	5	0	0^{r}
14	(United States) T Paul	7	6	1

Third round
1	(Italy) J Sinner	6	6	6
(Australia) C O'Connell	1	4	2
Q	(Canada) G Diallo	7^{7}	3	1	6^{3}
14	(United States) T Paul	6^{5}	6	6	7^{7}

Fourth round
1	(Italy) J Sinner	7^{7}	7^{7}	6
14	(United States) T Paul	6^{3}	6^{5}	1

==== Section 2 ====
First round
11	(Greece) S Tsitsipas	6^{5}	6	3	5
(Australia) T Kokkinakis	7^{7}	4	6	7
(Portugal) N Borges	6	6	6
(Argentina) F Coria	2	4	1
WC	(Australia) T Schoolkate	4	4	6	7^{8}	6
(Japan) T Daniel	6	6	4	6^{6}	4
(Czech Republic) J Menšík	6	6	6
19	(Canada) F Auger-Aliassime	2	4	2
31	(Italy) F Cobolli	6	4	6	6
(Australia) J Duckworth	1	6	4	4
(Belgium) Z Bergs	6	4	6	3	7^{10}
P Kotov	2	6	2	6	6^{7}
(Hungary) F Marozsán	2	6	3	6	6
Q	(Serbia) H Medjedovic	6	1	6	1	4
(Serbia) D Lajović	3	6	3	1
5	D Medvedev	6	3	6	6

Second round
(Australia) T Kokkinakis	4	5	5
(Portugal) N Borges	6	7	7
WC	(Australia) T Schoolkate	7^{7}	6	2	6^{5}	6^{3}
(Czech Republic) J Menšík	6^{4}	2	6	7^{7}	7^{10}
31	(Italy) F Cobolli	4	6	7	6
(Belgium) Z Bergs	6	3	5	3
(Hungary) F Marozsán	3	2	6^{5}
5	D Medvedev	6	6	7^{7}

Third round
(Portugal) N Borges	6^{5}	6	3	7^{8}	6
(Czech Republic) J Menšík	7^{7}	1	6	6^{6}	0
31	(Italy) F Cobolli	3	4	3
5	D Medvedev	6	6	6

Fourth round
(Portugal) N Borges	0	1	3
5	D Medvedev	6	6	6

==== Section 3 ====
First round
3	(Spain) C Alcaraz	6	4	6	6
Q	(Australia) L Tu	2	6	3	1
PR	(Canada) D Shapovalov	4	5	4
(Netherlands) B van de Zandschulp	6	7	6
(Argentina) F Díaz Acosta	6	6	6
(France) H Gaston	1	4	2
(China) Z Zhang	3	0	0^{r}
25	(United Kingdom) J Draper	6	6	4
22	(Chile) A Tabilo	6^{7}	1	5
(Belgium) D Goffin	7^{9}	6	7
(Croatia) B Ćorić	5	2	3
(France) A Mannarino	7	6	6
(Italy) F Fognini	5	1	3
(Czech Republic) T Macháč	7	6	6
(France) C Moutet	6^{3}	1	0
16	(United States) S Korda	7^{7}	6	6

Second round
3	(Spain) C Alcaraz	1	5	4
(Netherlands) B van de Zandschulp	6	7	6
(Argentina) F Díaz Acosta	4	2	2
25	(United Kingdom) J Draper	6	6	6
(Belgium) D Goffin	6^{8}	6	6	7^{7}
(France) A Mannarino	7^{10}	3	2	6^{1}
(Czech Republic) T Macháč	6	6	6
16	(United States) S Korda	4	2	4

Third round
(Netherlands) B van de Zandschulp	3	4	2
25	(United Kingdom) J Draper	6	6	6
(Belgium) D Goffin	3	1	2
(Czech Republic) T Macháč	6	6	6

Fourth round
25	(United Kingdom) J Draper	6	6	6
(Czech Republic) T Macháč	3	1	2

==== Section 4 ====
First round
10	(Australia) A de Minaur	6	6	5	6
(United States) M Giron	3	4	7	4
Q	(Finland) O Virtanen	6	6	6^{4}	6
Q	(France) Q Halys	3	3	7^{7}	2
(Argentina) M Navone	1	6	6	6
(Germany) D Altmaier	6	2	4	1
(United Kingdom) D Evans	6^{6}	7^{7}	7^{7}	4	6
23	K Khachanov	7^{8}	6^{2}	6^{4}	6	4
30	(Italy) M Arnaldi	6	6	6
WC	(United States) Z Svajda	3	2	1
WC	(United States) M Forbes	4	6^{2}	2
R Safiullin	6	7^{7}	6
(France) C Lestienne	1	3	2
(Australia) J Thompson	6	6	6
Q	(Kazakhstan) T Skatov	3	6^{4}	6^{3}
7	(Poland) H Hurkacz	6	7^{7}	7^{7}

Second round
10	(Australia) A de Minaur	7	6	7^{7}
Q	(Finland) O Virtanen	5	1	6^{3}
(Argentina) M Navone	4	3	3
(United Kingdom) D Evans	6	6	6
30	(Italy) M Arnaldi	6	6	6
R Safiullin	2	4	4
(Australia) J Thompson	7^{7}	6	7
7	(Poland) H Hurkacz	6^{2}	1	5

Third round
10	(Australia) A de Minaur	6	6^{4}	6	6
(United Kingdom) D Evans	3	7^{7}	0	0
30	(Italy) M Arnaldi	5	2	6^{5}
(Australia) J Thompson	7	6	7^{7}

Fourth round
10	(Australia) A de Minaur	6	3	6	7
(Australia) J Thompson	0	6	3	5

=== Bottom half ===
==== Section 5 ====
First round
8	(Norway) C Ruud	7^{7}	6	6
Q	(China) Y Bu	6^{2}	2	2
(France) G Monfils	6^{2}	6	6	6
Q	(Argentina) D Schwartzman	7^{7}	2	2	1
Q	(United Kingdom) J Choinski	2	3	7	7^{7}	3
(Spain) R Carballés Baena	6	6	5	6^{5}	6
(China) J Shang	6	3	5	6	6
27	(Kazakhstan) A Bublik	4	6	7	3	4
17	(France) U Humbert	6	6	6
(Brazil) T Monteiro	3	4	4
PR	(Switzerland) D Stricker	6	3	6^{4}	3
(Argentina) F Comesaña	4	6	7^{7}	6
(Spain) A Ramos Viñolas	6^{2}	2	3
(Italy) M Berrettini	7^{7}	6	6
(Argentina) C Ugo Carabelli	5	1	2
12	(United States) T Fritz	7	6	6

Second round
8	(Norway) C Ruud	6	6	2	7^{7}
(France) G Monfils	4	2	6	6^{3}
(Spain) R Carballés Baena	2	3	6^{2}
(China) J Shang	6	6	7^{7}
17	(France) U Humbert	7	4	4	4
(Argentina) F Comesaña	5	6	6	6
(Italy) M Berrettini	3	6^{1}	1
12	(United States) T Fritz	6	7^{7}	6

Third round
8	(Norway) C Ruud	6^{1}	3	6	6	6
(China) J Shang	7^{7}	6	0	3	1
(Argentina) F Comesaña	3	4	2
12	(United States) T Fritz	6	6	6

Fourth round
8	(Norway) C Ruud	6	4	3	2
12	(United States) T Fritz	3	6	6	6

==== Section 6 ====
First round
15	(Denmark) H Rune	2	1	4
(United States) B Nakashima	6	6	6
(France) A Cazaux	6	6	6
PR	(Spain) P Carreño Busta	1	3	3
(Japan) Y Nishioka	6^{2}	6	7	5	0^{r}
(Serbia) M Kecmanović	7^{7}	2	5	7	1
PR	(United States) R Opelka	6^{3}	6	1	5
18	(Italy) L Musetti	7^{7}	1	6	7
29	(Argentina) F Cerúndolo	5	6	6	6
(Austria) S Ofner	7	4	4	2
(France) G Mpetshi Perricard	4	2	3
(Argentina) TM Etcheverry	6	6	6
WC	(France) A Müller	3	7^{9}	6	6
(Australia) A Walton	6	6^{7}	3	4
LL	(Germany) M Marterer	2	7^{7}	3	2
4	(Germany) A Zverev	6	6^{5}	6	6

Second round
(United States) B Nakashima	6	6	6
(France) A Cazaux	4	4	2
(Serbia) M Kecmanović	6	4	4	6	5
18	(Italy) L Musetti	3	6	6	2	7
29	(Argentina) F Cerúndolo	3	6	4	6	3
(Argentina) TM Etcheverry	6	4	6	1	6
WC	(France) A Müller	4	6^{5}	1
4	(Germany) A Zverev	6	7^{7}	6

Third round
(United States) B Nakashima	6	3	6	7^{7}
18	(Italy) L Musetti	2	6	3	6^{4}
(Argentina) TM Etcheverry	7	5	1	3
4	(Germany) A Zverev	5	7	6	6

Fourth round
(United States) B Nakashima	6	1	2	2
4	(Germany) A Zverev	3	6	6	6

==== Section 7 ====
First round
6	A Rublev	6	7^{7}	7
(Brazil) T Seyboth Wild	3	6^{3}	5
WC	(United States) C Eubanks	4	6	6	3	6^{8}
(France) A Rinderknech	6	4	3	6	7^{10}
Q	(France) H Grenier	6	3	4	5
Q	(United States) M Krueger	4	6	6	7
(Hungary) M Fucsovics	6	4	3	0^{r}
32	(Czech Republic) J Lehečka	1	6	6	3
21	(Argentina) S Báez	6	6^{3}	6	7^{7}
(Italy) L Darderi	4	7^{7}	0	6^{4}
(India) S Nagal	1	3	6^{6}
(Netherlands) T Griekspoor	6	6	7^{8}
(Australia) R Hijikata	7^{7}	3	6	6
(Spain) A Davidovich Fokina	6^{1}	6	4	3
Q	(France) K Jacquet	3	4	2
9	(Bulgaria) G Dimitrov	6	6	6

Second round
6	A Rublev	4	5	6	6	6
(France) A Rinderknech	6	7	1	2	2
Q	(United States) M Krueger	7^{7}	6	4	4	5
32	(Czech Republic) J Lehečka	6^{5}	0	6	6	7
21	(Argentina) S Báez	1	0^{r}
(Netherlands) T Griekspoor	6	2
(Australia) R Hijikata	1	1	6^{4}
9	(Bulgaria) G Dimitrov	6	6	7^{7}

Third round
6	A Rublev	6	7	6
32	(Czech Republic) J Lehečka	3	5	4
(Netherlands) T Griekspoor	3	3	1
9	(Bulgaria) G Dimitrov	6	6	6

Fourth round
6	A Rublev	3	6^{3}	6	6	3
9	(Bulgaria) G Dimitrov	6	7^{7}	1	3	6

==== Section 8 ====
First round
13	(United States) B Shelton	6	6	6
WC	(Austria) D Thiem	4	2	2
(Italy) L Nardi	5	6^{3}	6^{5}
(Spain) R Bautista Agut	7	7^{7}	7^{7}
(Kazakhstan) A Shevchenko	6	7	5	6
(Germany) D Koepfer	3	5	7	2
(United States) A Kovacevic	4	3	6	5
20	(United States) F Tiafoe	6	6	4	7
28	(Australia) A Popyrin	7	6	6
PR	(South Korea) S-w Kwon	5	2	3
(Spain) P Martínez	6^{6}	6	6	3	7^{10}
Q	(Poland) M Kaśnikowski	7^{8}	1	2	6	6^{6}
(Serbia) L Djere	6^{7}	6	6^{7}	6	6
(Germany) J-L Struff	7^{9}	1	7^{9}	4	2
Q	(Moldova) R Albot	2	2	4
2	(Serbia) N Djokovic	6	6	6

Second round
13	(United States) B Shelton	6	6	6
(Spain) R Bautista Agut	3	4	4
(Kazakhstan) A Shevchenko	4	1	0^{r}
20	(United States) F Tiafoe	6	6	1
28	(Australia) A Popyrin	6	6	6
(Spain) P Martínez	2	4	0
(Serbia) L Djere	4	4	0^{r}
2	(Serbia) N Djokovic	6	6	2

Third round
13	(United States) B Shelton	6	5	7^{7}	4	3
20	(United States) F Tiafoe	4	7	6^{5}	6	6
28	(Australia) A Popyrin	6	6	2	6
2	(Serbia) N Djokovic	4	4	6	4

Fourth round
20	(United States) F Tiafoe	6	7^{7}	2	6
28	(Australia) A Popyrin	4	6^{3}	6	3

== Seeded players ==
The following are the seeded players. Seedings are based on ATP rankings as of August 19, 2024. Rankings and points before are as of August 26, 2024.

Seed	Rank	Player	Points before	Points defending	Points won	Points after	Status
1	1	(Italy) Jannik Sinner	9,360	180	2,000	11,180	Champion, defeated (United States) Taylor Fritz [12]
2	2	(Serbia) Novak Djokovic	7,460	2,000	100	5,560	Third round lost to (Australia) Alexei Popyrin [28]
3	3	(Spain) Carlos Alcaraz	7,360	720	50	6,690	Second round lost to (Netherlands) Botic van de Zandschulp
4	4	(Germany) Alexander Zverev	7,035	360	400	7,075	Quarterfinals lost to (United States) Taylor Fritz [12]
5	5	Daniil Medvedev	6,275	1,200	400	5,475	Quarterfinals lost to (Italy) Jannik Sinner [1]
6	6	Andrey Rublev	4,805	360	200	4,645	Fourth round lost to (Bulgaria) Grigor Dimitrov [9]
7	7	(Poland) Hubert Hurkacz	4,055	45	50	4,060	Second round lost to (Australia) Jordan Thompson
8	8	(Norway) Casper Ruud	3,855	45	200	4,010	Fourth round lost to (United States) Taylor Fritz [12]
9	9	(Bulgaria) Grigor Dimitrov	3,655	90	400	3,965	Quarterfinals retired against (United States) Frances Tiafoe [20]
10	10	(Australia) Alex de Minaur	3,435	180	400	3,655	Quarterfinals lost to (United Kingdom) Jack Draper [25]
11	11	(Greece) Stefanos Tsitsipas	3,425	45	10	3,390	First round lost to (Australia) Thanasi Kokkinakis
12	12	(United States) Taylor Fritz	3,120	360	1,300	4,060	Runner-up, lost to (Italy) Jannik Sinner [1]
13	13	(United States) Ben Shelton	3,110	720	100	2,490	Third round lost to (United States) Frances Tiafoe [20]
14	14	(United States) Tommy Paul	2,985	180	200	3,005	Fourth round lost to (Italy) Jannik Sinner [1]
15	15	(Denmark) Holger Rune	2,780	10	10	2,780	First round lost to (United States) Brandon Nakashima
16	16	(United States) Sebastian Korda	2,545	10	50	2,585	Second round lost to (Czech Republic) Tomáš Macháč
17	17	(France) Ugo Humbert	2,330	10	50	2,370	Second round lost to (Argentina) Francisco Comesaña
18	18	(Italy) Lorenzo Musetti	2,255	10	100	2,345	Third round lost to (United States) Brandon Nakashima
19	19	(Canada) Félix Auger-Aliassime	2,170	10	10	2,170	First round lost to (Czech Republic) Jakub Menšík
20	20	(United States) Frances Tiafoe	2,120	360	800	2,560	Semifinals lost to (United States) Taylor Fritz [12]
21	23	(Argentina) Sebastián Báez	1,800	90	50	1,760	Second round retired against (Netherlands) Tallon Griekspoor
22	21	(Chile) Alejandro Tabilo	1,978	(25)^{†}	10	1,963	First round lost to (Belgium) David Goffin
23	22	Karen Khachanov	1,930	10	10	1,930	First round lost to (United Kingdom) Dan Evans
24	24	(France) Arthur Fils	1,770	45	50	1,775	Second round lost to (Canada) Gabriel Diallo [Q]
25	25	(United Kingdom) Jack Draper	1,695	180	800	2,315	Semifinals lost to (Italy) Jannik Sinner [1]
26	26	(Chile) Nicolás Jarry	1,675	90	10	1,595	First round lost to (Australia) Christopher O'Connell
27	27	(Kazakhstan) Alexander Bublik	1,650	10	10	1,650	First round lost to (China) Shang Juncheng
28	28	(Australia) Alexei Popyrin	1,635	10	200	1,825	Fourth round lost to (United States) Frances Tiafoe [20]
29	29	(Argentina) Francisco Cerúndolo	1,495	45	50	1,500	Second round lost to (Argentina) Tomás Martín Etcheverry
30	30	(Italy) Matteo Arnaldi	1,470	180	100	1,390	Third round lost to (Australia) Jordan Thompson
31	31	(Italy) Flavio Cobolli	1,418	(36)^{‡}	100	1,482	Third round lost to Daniil Medvedev [5]
32	38	(Czech Republic) Jiří Lehečka	1,255	10	100	1,345	Third round lost to Andrey Rublev [6]

† The player did not qualify for the tournament in 2023. Points for his 19th best result will be deducted instead.
‡ The player did not qualify for the tournament in 2023. He is defending points from an ATP Challenger Tour event (Tulln) instead.

== Other entry information ==
=== Wildcards ===
- (United States) Christopher Eubanks
- (United States) Matthew Forbes
- (France) Alexandre Müller
- (Australia) Tristan Schoolkate
- (United States) Zachary Svajda
- (Austria) Dominic Thiem
- (United States) Learner Tien
- (Switzerland) Stan Wawrinka

=== Protected ranking ===
- (Spain) Pablo Carreño Busta (18)
- (South Korea) Kwon Soon-woo (80)
- (United States) Reilly Opelka (33)
- (Canada) Denis Shapovalov (27)
- (Switzerland) Dominic Stricker (94)

=== Qualifiers ===
- (Moldova) Radu Albot
- (Italy) Mattia Bellucci
- (China) Bu Yunchaokete
- (United Kingdom) Jan Choinski
- (Canada) Gabriel Diallo
- (France) Hugo Grenier
- (France) Quentin Halys
- (France) Kyrian Jacquet
- (Poland) Maks Kaśnikowski
- (United States) Mitchell Krueger
- (Serbia) Hamad Medjedovic
- (Argentina) Diego Schwartzman
- (Kazakhstan) Timofey Skatov
- (United States) Eliot Spizzirri
- (Australia) Li Tu
- (Finland) Otto Virtanen

=== Lucky loser ===
- (Germany) Maximilian Marterer

=== Withdrawals ===
The entry list was released based on the ATP rankings for the week of July 15, 2024.

- ‡ (Spain) Rafael Nadal (9 PR) → replaced by (United States) Mackenzie McDonald (99)
- ‡ (United Kingdom) Cameron Norrie (42) → replaced by (Argentina) Francisco Comesaña (100)
- § (Finland) Emil Ruusuvuori (70) → replaced by (Germany) Maximilian Marterer (LL)

‡ – withdrew from entry list
§ – withdrew from main draw

Preceded by 2024 Wimbledon Championships – Men's singles	Grand Slam men's singles	Succeeded by 2025 Australian Open – Men's singles
