= Matthew Forbes =

American tennis player (born 2006)

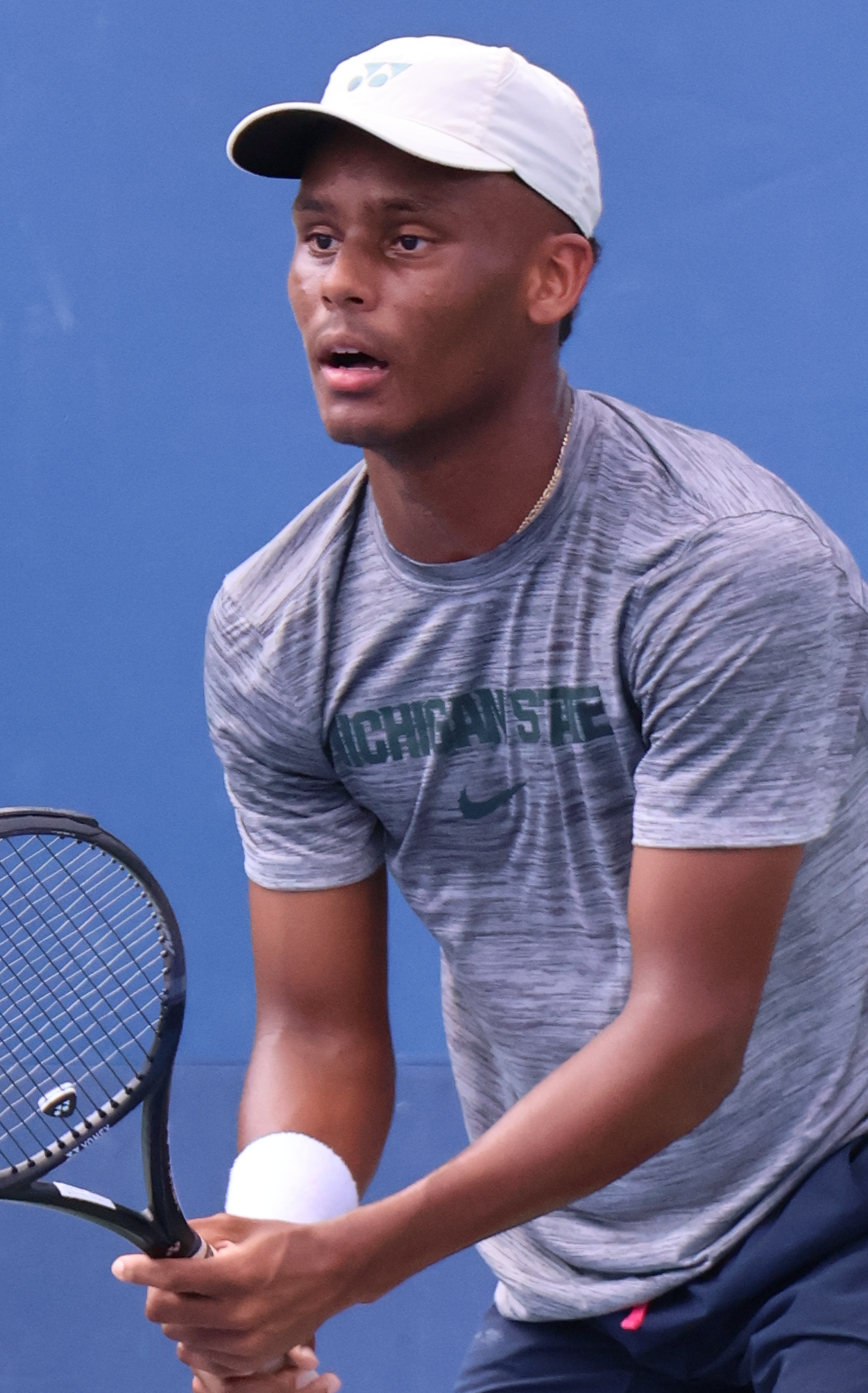
- Forbes at the 2024 US Open
- Country (sports): United States
- Residence: Raleigh, North Carolina, US
- Born: 6 April 2006 (age 20) Oceanside, New York, US
- Height: 6 ft 3 in (1.91 m)
- Plays: Right-handed (two-handed backhand)
- College: Ohio State
- Prize money: US $113,464

Singles
- Career record: 0–1 (at ATP Tour level, Grand Slam level, and in Davis Cup)
- Career titles: 0
- Highest ranking: No. 741 (July 20, 2026)
- Current ranking: No. 770 (August 31, 2026)

Grand Slam singles results
- US Open: 1R (2024)

Doubles
- Career record: 0–0 (at ATP Tour level, Grand Slam level, and in Davis Cup)
- Career titles: 0
- Highest ranking: No. 1,930 (July 20, 2026)
- Current ranking: No. 2,352 (August 31, 2026)
- Last updated on: September 1, 2026.

Matthew Forbes (born April 6, 2006) is an American tennis player. He has a career-high ATP singles ranking of No. 741 and a doubles ranking of No. 1,930, both achieved on July 20, 2026. He plays collegiate tennis at Ohio State University.

== Early life ==
Forbes was born to Jamaican parents. He is the youngest of three siblings. His older sister, Abigail, is also a tennis player.

== Junior career ==
In December 2023, he and compatriot Andrew Delgado won the boys' doubles title at the Orange Bowl. In August 2024, he won the USTA Boys' 18 National Championships and was awarded a wildcard into the main draw of the US Open.

== Professional career ==
In February 2024, Forbes made his professional debut at the $15k City of Sunrise Pro Tennis Classic as a junior exempt entry. The following week, he qualified for the $15k Palm Coast Open and reached the second round. Later that year, he made his Grand Slam debut at the US Open as a wildcard, but lost in the first round to Roman Safiullin.

== Performance timelines ==
Key
| W | F | SF | QF | #R | RR | Q# | DNQ | A | NH |

(W) winner; (F) finalist; (SF) semifinalist; (QF) quarterfinalist; (#R) rounds 4, 3, 2, 1; (RR) round-robin stage; (Q#) qualification round; (DNQ) did not qualify; (A) absent; (NH) not held; (SR) strike rate (events won / competed); (W–L) win–loss record.
To avoid confusion and double counting, these charts are updated at the conclusion of a tournament or when the player's participation has ended.

Current through the 2024 US Open.

=== Singles ===
| Tournament | 2024 | SR | W–L | Win% |
|---|---|---|---|---|
| Australian Open | A | 0 / 0 | 0–0 | – |
| French Open | A | 0 / 0 | 0–0 | – |
| Wimbledon | A | 0 / 0 | 0–0 | – |
| US Open | 1R | 0 / 1 | 0–1 | 0% |
| Win–loss | 0–1 | 0 / 1 | 0–1 | 0% |

== ITF World Tennis Tour finals ==
=== Singles: 1 (runner-up) ===
| Legend ITF WTT (0–1) |

| Result | W–L | Date | Tournament | Tier | Surface | Opponent | Score |
|---|---|---|---|---|---|---|---|
| Loss | 0–1 | Oct 2025 | M25 Norman, US | WTT | Hard | (France) Raphael Perot | 6–3, 1–6, 5–7 |
