= Dan Martin (tennis) =

Canadian tennis player (born 1999)

- Country (sports): Canada
- Residence: Laval, Quebec
- Born: 9 May 1999 (age 26) Bucharest, Romania
- Height: 1.75 m (5 ft 9 in)
- Plays: Right-handed (one-handed backhand)
- College: Dartmouth; Miami
- Prize money: $98,785

Singles
- Career record: 0–1 (at ATP Tour level, Grand Slam level, and in Davis Cup)
- Career titles: 2 ITF
- Highest ranking: No. 378 (6 April 2026)
- Current ranking: No. 378 (6 April 2026)

Doubles
- Career record: 0–0 (at ATP Tour level, Grand Slam level, and in Davis Cup)
- Career titles: 3 ITF
- Highest ranking: No. 440 (29 September 2025)
- Current ranking: No. 499 (6 April 2026)
- Last updated on: 6 April 2026.

Dan Martin (born 9 May 1999) is a Romanian-born Canadian tennis player. He has a career high ATP singles ranking of world No. 378 achieved on 6 April 2026 and a doubles ranking of No. 440 achieved on 29 September 2025.

Martin played college tennis at Dartmouth before transferring to Miami.

== Career ==
Martin made his ATP main draw debut after qualifying for the 2025 Canadian Open, losing to Jaume Munar in the first round.
