= 2014 Slovak Open – Singles =

Singles
- 2014 Slovak Open

Final
- Champion: (Germany) Peter Gojowczyk
- Runner-up: (Uzbekistan) Farrukh Dustov
- Score: 7–6^{(7–2)}, 6–3

Events
Singles	Doubles
← 2013 ·	Slovak Open	· 2015 →

Peter Gojowczyk won the title, beating Farrukh Dustov 7–6^{(7–2)}, 6–3.

== Seeds ==
1. (Czech Republic) Jiří Veselý (first round)
2. (Slovakia) Lukáš Lacko (quarterfinals)
3. (Russia) Andrey Kuznetsov (first round)
4. (Netherlands) Igor Sijsling (semifinals)
5. (Serbia) Filip Krajinović (first round)
6. (Bosnia and Herzegovina) Damir Džumhur (first round)
7. (Germany) Peter Gojowczyk (champion)
8. (Serbia) Viktor Troicki (second round)

== Draw ==
=== Key ===
- Q = Qualifier
- WC = Wild card
- LL = Lucky loser
- Alt = Alternate
- SE = Special exempt
- PR = Protected ranking
- ITF = ITF entry
- JE = Junior exempt
- w/o = Walkover
- r = Retired
- d = Defaulted
- SR = Special ranking

=== Finals ===
Semifinals
(Uzbekistan) Farrukh Dustov	7^{13}	6^{5}	7
4	(Netherlands) Igor Sijsling	6^{11}	7^{7}	5
(Kazakhstan) Aleksandr Nedovyesov	3	4
7	(Germany) Peter Gojowczyk	6	6

Final
(Uzbekistan) Farrukh Dustov	6^{2}	3
7	(Germany) Peter Gojowczyk	7^{7}	6

=== Top half ===
First round
1	(Czech Republic) J Veselý	6	3	4
(Uzbekistan) F Dustov	3	6	6
(Poland) M Przysiężny	6	7^{7}
(Germany) M Berrer	4	6^{4}
Q	(Czech Republic) Pavel Štaubert	4	6	3
WC	(Slovakia) F Horanský	6	3	6
(Slovakia) N Gombos	6	6
6	(Bosnia and Herzegovina) D Džumhur	3	2
4	(Netherlands) I Sijsling	6	7^{7}
Q	(Germany) Y Maden	2	6^{4}
(Israel) D Sela	3	2^{r}
(Croatia) A Pavić	6	3
WC	(Czech Republic) A Pavlásek	6^{2}	7^{8}	7^{8}
WC	(Slovakia) M Mečíř	7^{7}	6^{6}	6^{6}
(Chinese Taipei) J Wang	6	6
5	(Serbia) F Krajinović	1	2

Second round
(Uzbekistan) F Dustov	6	6
(Poland) M Przysiężny	4	4
WC	(Slovakia) F Horanský	3	4
(Slovakia) N Gombos	6	6
4	(Netherlands) I Sijsling	7^{7}	6
(Croatia) A Pavić	6^{4}	4
WC	(Czech Republic) A Pavlásek	4	3
(Chinese Taipei) J Wang	6	6

Quarterfinals
(Uzbekistan) F Dustov	6^{2}	6	7^{7}
(Slovakia) N Gombos	7^{7}	3	6^{4}
4	(Netherlands) I Sijsling	6	3	6
(Chinese Taipei) J Wang	4	6	3

Semifinals
(Uzbekistan) F Dustov	7^{13}	6^{5}	7
4	(Netherlands) I Sijsling	6^{11}	7^{7}	5

=== Bottom half ===
First round
8	(Serbia) V Troicki	6^{2}	6	6
Alt	(Croatia) M Delić	7^{7}	1	4
(Ukraine) I Marchenko	7^{8}	6
Q	(Croatia) F Veger	6^{6}	3
WC	(Slovakia) J Kovalík	6^{4}	2
(Russia) A Kudryavtsev	7^{7}	6
(Kazakhstan) A Nedovyesov	4	7^{7}	6
3	(Russia) A Kuznetsov	6	6^{5}	2
7	(Germany) P Gojowczyk	6	6
(Romania) A Ungur	2	3
(Slovakia) A Martin	6^{6}	6	6
(Austria) G Melzer	7^{8}	3	4
(Austria) J Melzer	3	6	7^{12}
(Hungary) M Fucsovics	6	4	6^{10}
Q	(Slovakia) Adrian Sikora	1	2
2	(Slovakia) L Lacko	6	6

Second round
8	(Serbia) V Troicki	4	2
(Ukraine) I Marchenko	6	6
(Russia) A Kudryavtsev	6^{1}	4
(Kazakhstan) A Nedovyesov	7^{7}	6
7	(Germany) P Gojowczyk	6	6
(Slovakia) A Martin	1	4
(Austria) J Melzer	6	3	6^{1}
2	(Slovakia) L Lacko	3	6	7^{7}

Quarterfinals
(Ukraine) I Marchenko	6	3	4
(Kazakhstan) A Nedovyesov	4	6	6
7	(Germany) P Gojowczyk	7	6
2	(Slovakia) L Lacko	5	4

Semifinals
(Kazakhstan) A Nedovyesov	3	4
7	(Germany) P Gojowczyk	6	6
