= 2016 Slovak Open – Men's doubles =

Men's doubles
- 2016 Slovak Open

Final
- Champions: (United Kingdom) Ken Skupski (United Kingdom) Neal Skupski
- Runners-up: (India) Purav Raja (India) Divij Sharan
- Score: 4–6, 6–3, [10–5]

Events
Singles	men	women
Doubles	men	women
← 2015 ·	Slovak Open	· 2017 →

Ilija Bozoljac and Igor Zelenay were the defending champions but only Zelenay chose to defend his title, partnering Denys Molchanov. Zelenay lost in the quarterfinals to Ken and Neal Skupski.

Skupski and Skupski won the title after defeating Purav Raja and Divij Sharan 4–6, 6–3, [10–5] in the final.

== Seeds ==
1. (Poland) Mariusz Fyrstenberg / (Serbia) Nenad Zimonjić (semifinals)
2. (Netherlands) Wesley Koolhof / (Netherlands) Matwé Middelkoop (first round)
3. (India) Purav Raja / (India) Divij Sharan (final)
4. (United Kingdom) Ken Skupski / (United Kingdom) Neal Skupski (champions)

== Draw ==
=== Key ===
- Q = Qualifier
- WC = Wild card
- LL = Lucky loser
- Alt = Alternate
- SE = Special exempt
- PR = Protected ranking
- ITF = ITF entry
- JE = Junior exempt
- w/o = Walkover
- r = Retired
- d = Defaulted
- SR = Special ranking

First round
1	(Poland) M Fyrstenberg (Serbia) N Zimonjić	6	7^{7}
WC	(Slovakia) L Klein (Slovakia) A Molčan	4	6^{2}
WC	(Turkey) S Ağabigün (Turkey) C İlkel	4	3
(Kazakhstan) A Golubev (Belarus) A Vasilevski	6	6
4	(United Kingdom) K Skupski (United Kingdom) N Skupski	7	6
(Kazakhstan) A Nedovyesov (Czech Republic) A Pavlásek	5	3
(Poland) T Bednarek (Belarus) A Bury	6^{5}	3
(Ukraine) D Molchanov (Slovakia) I Zelenay	7^{7}	6
Alt	(Egypt) M Safwat (Chinese Taipei) T-h Yang	3	5
(Austria) J Knowle (Austria) J Melzer	6	7
(Slovakia) A Martin (Austria) T-S Weissborn	4	0
3	(India) P Raja (India) D Sharan	6	6
(Italy) T Fabbiano (Russia) A Kudryavtsev	6^{7}	4
WC	(Slovakia) N Gombos (Czech Republic) J Šátral	7^{9}	6
(Russia) M Elgin (Uzbekistan) D Istomin	7^{7}	6
2	(Netherlands) W Koolhof (Netherlands) M Middelkoop	6^{4}	2

Quarterfinals
1	(Poland) M Fyrstenberg (Serbia) N Zimonjić	7^{7}	7^{7}
(Kazakhstan) A Golubev (Belarus) A Vasilevski	6^{5}	6^{3}
4	(United Kingdom) K Skupski (United Kingdom) N Skupski	7	6
(Ukraine) D Molchanov (Slovakia) I Zelenay	5	3
(Austria) J Knowle (Austria) J Melzer	1	2
3	(India) P Raja (India) D Sharan	6	6
WC	(Slovakia) N Gombos (Czech Republic) J Šátral	6	3	[4]
(Russia) M Elgin (Uzbekistan) D Istomin	3	6	[10]

Semifinals
1	(Poland) M Fyrstenberg (Serbia) N Zimonjić	4	6^{2}
4	(United Kingdom) K Skupski (United Kingdom) N Skupski	6	7^{7}
3	(India) P Raja (India) D Sharan	3	7^{7}	[10]
(Russia) M Elgin (Uzbekistan) D Istomin	6	6^{3}	[3]

Final
4	(United Kingdom) K Skupski (United Kingdom) N Skupski	4	6	[10]
3	(India) P Raja (India) D Sharan	6	3	[5]
