= 2014 Slovak Open – Doubles =

Doubles
- 2014 Slovak Open

Final
- Champion: (United Kingdom) Ken Skupski (United Kingdom) Neal Skupski
- Runner-up: (Slovakia) Norbert Gombos (Czech Republic) Adam Pavlásek
- Score: 6–3, 7–6^{(7–3)}

Events
Singles	Doubles
← 2013 ·	Slovak Open	· 2015 →

Henri Kontinen and Andreas Siljeström were the defending champions, but they did not compete that year.
Ken Skupski and Neal Skupski won the title, defeating Norbert Gombos and Adam Pavlásek in the final, 6–3, 7–6^{(7–3)}.

== Seeds ==
1. (Sweden) Johan Brunström / (United States) Nicholas Monroe (first round)
2. (Czech Republic) František Čermák / (Israel) Jonathan Erlich (quarterfinals)
3. (United Kingdom) Colin Fleming / (United Kingdom) Jonathan Marray (semifinals)
4. (United Kingdom) Ken Skupski / (United Kingdom) Neal Skupski (champions)

== Draw ==
=== Key ===
- Q = Qualifier
- WC = Wild card
- LL = Lucky loser
- Alt = Alternate
- SE = Special exempt
- PR = Protected ranking
- ITF = ITF entry
- JE = Junior exempt
- w/o = Walkover
- r = Retired
- d = Defaulted
- SR = Special ranking

=== Draw ===
First round
1	(Sweden) J Brunström (United States) N Monroe	6^{10}	4
WC	(Slovakia) N Gombos (Czech Republic) A Pavlásek	7^{12}	6
(Israel) D Sela (Chinese Taipei) J Wang	w/o
(Austria) G Melzer (Austria) J Melzer
3	(United Kingdom) C Fleming (United Kingdom) J Marray	7^{7}	6
(Czech Republic) R Jebavý (Czech Republic) J Veselý	6^{4}	4
(Russia) M Elgin (Russia) A Kuznetsov	7^{7}	4	[3]
WC	(Switzerland) M Chiudinelli (Switzerland) M Lammer	6^{5}	6	[10]
(Germany) M Emmrich (Germany) G Kretschmer	6	6
(Australia) R Junaid (Slovakia) I Zelenay	2	4
WC	(Slovakia) J Kovalík (Slovakia) M Mečíř
4	(United Kingdom) K Skupski (United Kingdom) N Skupski	w/o
Alt	(Belarus) U Ignatik (Ukraine) I Marchenko	1	6	[3]
(Croatia) A Pavić (Croatia) M Pavić	6	3	[10]
(Russia) A Kudryavtsev (Kazakhstan) A Nedovyesov	4	6	[7]
2	(Czech Republic) F Čermák (Israel) J Erlich	6	4	[10]

Quarterfinals
WC	(Slovakia) N Gombos (Czech Republic) A Pavlásek	5
(Israel) D Sela (Chinese Taipei) J Wang	0^{r}
3	(United Kingdom) C Fleming (United Kingdom) J Marray	7^{7}	6
WC	(Switzerland) M Chiudinelli (Switzerland) M Lammer	6^{2}	6
(Germany) M Emmrich (Germany) G Kretschmer	3	2
4	(United Kingdom) K Skupski (United Kingdom) N Skupski	6	6
(Croatia) A Pavić (Croatia) M Pavić	6^{6}	6	[10]
2	(Czech Republic) F Čermák (Israel) J Erlich	7^{8}	4	[6]

Semifinals
WC	(Slovakia) N Gombos (Czech Republic) A Pavlásek	4	7^{7}	[10]
3	(United Kingdom) C Fleming (United Kingdom) J Marray	6	6^{3}	[7]
4	(United Kingdom) K Skupski (United Kingdom) N Skupski	6	5	[11]
(Croatia) A Pavić (Croatia) M Pavić	3	7	[9]

Final
WC	(Slovakia) N Gombos (Czech Republic) A Pavlásek	3	6^{3}
4	(United Kingdom) K Skupski (United Kingdom) N Skupski	6	7^{7}
