= 2016 Slovak Open – Men's singles =

Men's singles
- 2016 Slovak Open

Final
- Champion: (Slovakia) Norbert Gombos
- Runner-up: (Romania) Marius Copil
- Score: 7–6^{(10–8)}, 4–6, 6–3

Events
Singles	men	women
Doubles	men	women
← 2015 ·	Slovak Open	· 2017 →

Egor Gerasimov was the defending champion but lost in the quarterfinals to Marius Copil.

Norbert Gombos won the title after defeating Copil 7–6^{(10–8)}, 4–6, 6–3 in the final.

== Seeds ==
1. (Germany) Florian Mayer (first round)
2. (Ukraine) Illya Marchenko (second round)
3. (Czech Republic) Adam Pavlásek (quarterfinals)
4. (Germany) Jan-Lennard Struff (second round)
5. (Czech Republic) Lukáš Rosol (first round)
6. (Russia) Daniil Medvedev (semifinals)
7. (Slovakia) Lukáš Lacko (first round)
8. (Slovakia) Jozef Kovalík (first round)

== Draw ==
=== Key ===
- Q = Qualifier
- WC = Wild card
- LL = Lucky loser
- Alt = Alternate
- SE = Special exempt
- PR = Protected ranking
- ITF = ITF entry
- JE = Junior exempt
- w/o = Walkover
- r = Retired
- d = Defaulted
- SR = Special ranking

=== Finals ===
Semifinals
(Romania) Marius Copil	7^{10}	7^{7}
6	(Russia) Daniil Medvedev	6^{8}	6^{5}
(Ukraine) Sergiy Stakhovsky	4	6^{4}
(Slovakia) Norbert Gombos	6	7^{7}

Final
(Romania) Marius Copil	6^{8}	6	3
(Slovakia) Norbert Gombos	7^{10}	4	6

=== Top half ===
First round
1	(Germany) F Mayer	6	6^{3}	6^{2}
(Belarus) U Ignatik	3	7^{7}	7^{7}
(Belarus) E Gerasimov	6	6
Q	(Slovakia) Patrik Fabian	3	3
WC	(Slovakia) L Klein	6^{4}	3
(Romania) M Copil	7^{7}	6
(Russia) A Kudryavtsev	7^{8}	2	6
5	(Czech Republic) L Rosol	6^{6}	6	3
3	(Czech Republic) A Pavlásek	6	7^{7}
(Slovakia) A Martin	2	6^{4}
(Egypt) M Safwat	7^{8}	7^{7}
(Turkey) M İlhan	6^{6}	6^{3}
Q	(Czech Republic) Petr Michnev	6^{5}	6	7^{7}
(Bosnia and Herzegovina) A Šetkić	7^{7}	3	6^{1}
Q	(Slovakia) F Horanský	3	3
6	(Russia) D Medvedev	6	6

Second round
(Belarus) U Ignatik	3	2
(Belarus) E Gerasimov	6	6
(Romania) M Copil	6	6
(Russia) A Kudryavtsev	4	4
3	(Czech Republic) A Pavlásek	6	6
(Egypt) M Safwat	4	2
Q	(Czech Republic) P Michnev	6^{8}	3
6	(Russia) D Medvedev	7^{10}	6

Quarterfinals
(Belarus) E Gerasimov	6^{4}	6^{5}
(Romania) M Copil	7^{7}	7^{7}
3	(Czech Republic) A Pavlásek	3	3
6	(Russia) D Medvedev	6	6

Semifinals
(Romania) M Copil	7^{10}	7^{7}
6	(Russia) D Medvedev	6^{8}	6^{5}

=== Bottom half ===
First round
7	(Slovakia) L Lacko	5	6^{4}
(Ukraine) S Stakhovsky	7	7^{7}
(Uzbekistan) D Istomin	7^{7}	6
WC	(Slovakia) Tomáš Líška	6^{3}	1
Q	(Austria) S Ofner	4	4
(Kazakhstan) A Nedovyesov	6	6
WC	(Slovakia) A Molčan	3	2
4	(Germany) J-L Struff	6	6
8	(Slovakia) J Kovalík	7^{7}	6^{5}	4
(Slovakia) N Gombos	6^{2}	7^{7}	6
PR	(Germany) C-M Stebe	6	7
(Italy) T Fabbiano	3	5
(Czech Republic) J Šátral	6^{9}	7^{7}	6^{2}
(Canada) V Pospisil	7^{11}	6^{5}	7^{7}
WC	(Slovakia) Patrik Néma	2	5
2	(Ukraine) I Marchenko	6	7

Second round
(Ukraine) S Stakhovsky	7^{7}	6
(Uzbekistan) D Istomin	6^{4}	3
(Kazakhstan) A Nedovyesov	6	3	7^{7}
4	(Germany) J-L Struff	3	6	6^{3}
(Slovakia) N Gombos	7^{7}	5	6
PR	(Germany) C-M Stebe	6^{3}	7	4
(Canada) V Pospisil	7^{7}	6
2	(Ukraine) I Marchenko	6^{3}	4

Quarterfinals
(Ukraine) S Stakhovsky	7^{7}	4	7^{9}
(Kazakhstan) A Nedovyesov	6^{4}	6	6^{7}
(Slovakia) N Gombos	6	6
(Canada) V Pospisil	4	3

Semifinals
(Ukraine) S Stakhovsky	4	6^{4}
(Slovakia) N Gombos	6	7^{7}
