= 2017 Slovak Open – Singles =

Singles
- 2017 Slovak Open

Final
- Champion: (Slovakia) Lukáš Lacko
- Runner-up: (Romania) Marius Copil
- Score: 6–4, 7–6^{(7–4)}

Events
Singles	Doubles
← 2016 ·	Slovak Open	· 2018 →

Norbert Gombos was the defending champion but lost in the first round to Jerzy Janowicz.

Lukáš Lacko won the title after defeating Marius Copil 6–4, 7–6^{(7–4)} in the final.

== Seeds ==
1. (Kazakhstan) Mikhail Kukushkin (semifinals, retired)
2. (Hungary) Márton Fucsovics (second round)
3. (Italy) Andreas Seppi (quarterfinals)
4. (Romania) Marius Copil (final)
5. (Cyprus) Marcos Baghdatis (second round, retired)
6. (Ukraine) Sergiy Stakhovsky (first round)
7. (Slovakia) Norbert Gombos (first round)
8. (Slovakia) Lukáš Lacko (champion)

== Draw ==
=== Key ===
- Q = Qualifier
- WC = Wild card
- LL = Lucky loser
- Alt = Alternate
- SE = Special exempt
- PR = Protected ranking
- ITF = ITF entry
- JE = Junior exempt
- w/o = Walkover
- r = Retired
- d = Defaulted
- SR = Special ranking

=== Finals ===
Semifinals
1	(Kazakhstan) Mikhail Kukushkin	3	0^{r}
4	(Romania) Marius Copil	6	3
(Estonia) Jürgen Zopp	6^{5}	2
8	(Slovakia) Lukáš Lacko	7^{7}	6

Final
4	(Romania) Marius Copil	4	6^{4}
8	(Slovakia) Lukáš Lacko	6	7^{7}

=== Top half ===
First round
1	(Kazakhstan) M Kukushkin	6	6
(Italy) A Giannessi	0	2
PR	(Netherlands) I Sijsling	4	2
Q	(Belgium) N Desein	6	6
(Australia) B Tomic	7^{7}	6
(Lithuania) R Berankis	6^{3}	2
(Poland) J Janowicz	3	7	7^{7}
7	(Slovakia) N Gombos	6	5	6^{5}
4	(Romania) M Copil	6	5	6
WC	(Slovakia) Patrik Néma	4	7	4
Alt	(Serbia) P Krstin	7^{7}	3	4
WC	(Slovakia) L Klein	6^{5}	6	6
WC	(Kazakhstan) A Nedovyesov	2	2
Q	(Poland) K Majchrzak	6	6
(Slovakia) A Martin	7^{7}	6
6	(Ukraine) S Stakhovsky	6^{3}	3

Second round
1	(Kazakhstan) M Kukushkin	6^{3}	6	6
Q	(Belgium) N Desein	7^{7}	3	4
(Australia) B Tomic	6^{3}	6^{2}
(Poland) J Janowicz	7^{7}	7^{7}
4	(Romania) M Copil	6	7
WC	(Slovakia) L Klein	4	5
Q	(Poland) K Majchrzak	4	6	6
(Slovakia) A Martin	6	3	2

Quarterfinals
1	(Kazakhstan) M Kukushkin	3	7^{7}	4
(Poland) J Janowicz	6	6^{2}	0^{r}
4	(Romania) M Copil	7^{7}	6
Q	(Poland) K Majchrzak	6^{4}	1

Semifinals
1	(Kazakhstan) M Kukushkin	3	0^{r}
4	(Romania) M Copil	6	3

=== Bottom half ===
First round
5	(Cyprus) M Baghdatis	6	6
LL	(Italy) M Viola	4	4
Q	(United Kingdom) T Farquharson	6^{4}	6	6^{5}
(Estonia) J Zopp	7^{7}	4	7^{7}
(Belarus) U Ignatik	6	1	7^{9}
(Czech Republic) V Šafránek	2	6	6^{7}
(Austria) S Ofner	3	2
3	(Italy) A Seppi	6	6
8	(Slovakia) L Lacko	6	6
(Slovakia) J Kovalík	4	4
(Canada) F Auger-Aliassime	6	6
(Germany) M Bachinger	2	4
(Bosnia and Herzegovina) A Šetkić	3	6	3
Q	(Croatia) F Škugor	6	2	6
WC	(Slovakia) Tomáš Líška	0	0
2	(Hungary) M Fucsovics	6	6

Second round
5	(Cyprus) M Baghdatis	6^{11}	0^{r}
(Estonia) J Zopp	7^{13}	2
(Belarus) U Ignatik	6^{5}	6^{8}
3	(Italy) A Seppi	7^{7}	7^{10}
8	(Slovakia) L Lacko	6^{11}	6	6
(Canada) F Auger-Aliassime	7^{13}	4	3
Q	(Croatia) F Škugor	6^{4}	6	6
2	(Hungary) M Fucsovics	7^{7}	4	3

Quarterfinals
(Estonia) J Zopp	7^{7}	6
3	(Italy) A Seppi	6^{4}	3
8	(Slovakia) L Lacko	6	3	6
Q	(Croatia) F Škugor	1	6	3

Semifinals
(Estonia) J Zopp	6^{5}	2
8	(Slovakia) L Lacko	7^{7}	6
