= 2018 Slovak Open – Doubles =

Doubles
- 2018 Slovak Open

Final
- Champions: (Ukraine) Denys Molchanov (Slovakia) Igor Zelenay
- Runners-up: (India) Ramkumar Ramanathan (Belarus) Andrei Vasilevski
- Score: 6–2, 3–6, [11–9]

Events
Singles	Doubles
← 2017 ·	Slovak Open	· 2019 →

Ken and Neal Skupski were the defending champions but only Ken Skupski chose to defend his title, partnering Jonny O'Mara. Ken Skupski lost in the semifinals to Denys Molchanov and Igor Zelenay.

Molchanov and Zelenay won the title after defeating Ramkumar Ramanathan and Andrei Vasilevski 6–2, 3–6, [11–9] in the final.

== Seeds ==
1. (United Kingdom) Jonny O'Mara / (United Kingdom) Ken Skupski (semifinals)
2. (Poland) Marcin Matkowski / (Austria) Philipp Oswald (first round)
3. (Ukraine) Denys Molchanov / (Slovakia) Igor Zelenay (champions)
4. (Spain) Gerard Granollers / (Spain) David Marrero (semifinals)

== Draw ==
=== Key ===
- Q = Qualifier
- WC = Wild card
- LL = Lucky loser
- Alt = Alternate
- SE = Special exempt
- PR = Protected ranking
- ITF = ITF entry
- JE = Junior exempt
- w/o = Walkover
- r = Retired
- d = Defaulted
- SR = Special ranking

First round
1	(United Kingdom) J O'Mara (United Kingdom) K Skupski	6	6
(Spain) G García López (Spain) S Gutiérrez Ferrol	4	3
(Switzerland) M-A Hüsler (France) S Robert	4	4
(India) P Raja (Croatia) A Šančić	6	6
3	(Ukraine) D Molchanov (Slovakia) I Zelenay	7^{7}	6
WC	(Slovakia) F Horanský (Slovakia) A Molčan	6^{5}	4
WC	(Slovakia) N Gombos (Slovakia) L Klein	7^{9}	6^{6}	[13]
(Bosnia and Herzegovina) T Brkić (Croatia) A Pavić	6^{7}	7^{8}	[11]
(Russia) E Donskoy (Ukraine) S Stakhovsky	6	4	[10]
(Netherlands) D Pel (Italy) A Vavassori	3	6	[4]
(Italy) D Bracciali (Germany) A Mies	6^{3}	1
4	(Spain) G Granollers (Spain) D Marrero	7^{7}	6
WC	(Slovakia) A Martin (Slovakia) F Polášek	4	6	[10]
(Belarus) A Bury (Austria) T-S Weissborn	6	3	[5]
(India) R Ramanathan (Belarus) A Vasilevski	6	3	[10]
2	(Poland) M Matkowski (Austria) P Oswald	3	6	[6]

Quarterfinals
1	(United Kingdom) J O'Mara (United Kingdom) K Skupski	4	6	[10]
(India) P Raja (Croatia) A Šančić	6	4	[6]
3	(Ukraine) D Molchanov (Slovakia) I Zelenay	6	6^{3}	[10]
WC	(Slovakia) N Gombos (Slovakia) L Klein	2	7^{7}	[6]
(Russia) E Donskoy (Ukraine) S Stakhovsky	3	2
4	(Spain) G Granollers (Spain) D Marrero	6	6
WC	(Slovakia) A Martin (Slovakia) F Polášek	6	3	[8]
(India) R Ramanathan (Belarus) A Vasilevski	4	6	[10]

Semifinals
1	(United Kingdom) J O'Mara (United Kingdom) K Skupski	4	5
3	(Ukraine) D Molchanov (Slovakia) I Zelenay	6	7
4	(Spain) G Granollers (Spain) D Marrero	5	6	[6]
(India) R Ramanathan (Belarus) A Vasilevski	7	4	[10]

Final
3	(Ukraine) D Molchanov (Slovakia) I Zelenay	6	3	[11]
(India) R Ramanathan (Belarus) A Vasilevski	2	6	[9]
