= 2013 Slovak Open – Doubles =

Doubles
- 2013 Slovak Open

Final
- Champion: (Finland) Henri Kontinen (Sweden) Andreas Siljeström
- Runner-up: (Germany) Gero Kretschmer (Germany) Jan-Lennard Struff
- Score: 7–6^{(8–6)}, 6–2

Events
Singles	Doubles
← 2012 ·	Slovak Open	· 2014 →

Lukáš Dlouhý and Michail Elgin were the defending champions but Dlouhy chose not to compete.
Elgin partnered with Michal Mertiňák and was defeated by losing finalist Gero Kretschmer and Jan-Lennard Struff, who in turn lost to Henri Kontinen and Andreas Siljeström.

== Seeds ==
1. (Czech Republic) František Čermák / (Poland) Łukasz Kubot (quarterfinals)
2. (Slovakia) Filip Polášek / (Czech Republic) Lukáš Rosol (quarterfinals)
3. (Russia) Michail Elgin / (Slovakia) Michal Mertiňák (semifinals)
4. (United Kingdom) Ken Skupski / (United Kingdom) Neal Skupski (semifinals)

== Draw ==
=== Key ===
- Q = Qualifier
- WC = Wild card
- LL = Lucky loser
- Alt = Alternate
- SE = Special exempt
- PR = Protected ranking
- ITF = ITF entry
- JE = Junior exempt
- w/o = Walkover
- r = Retired
- d = Defaulted
- SR = Special ranking

=== Draw ===
First round
1	(Czech Republic) F Čermák (Poland) Ł Kubot	7	6
WC	(Slovakia) Matej Maruščák (Slovakia) Jakub Oravec	5	3
(Slovakia) L Lacko (Slovakia) A Martin	4	2
(Germany) G Kretschmer (Germany) J-L Struff	6	6
3	(Russia) M Elgin (Slovakia) M Mertiňák	6	6
(Slovakia) I Klec (Slovakia) Adrian Sikora	3	2
(United Kingdom) J Delgado (Australia) J Kerr	6^{7}	7^{7}	[8]
(Belarus) U Ignatik (Ukraine) I Marchenko	7^{9}	6^{4}	[10]
(Austria) S Bader (Austria) D Thiem	6	6
WC	(Slovakia) M Kližan (Slovakia) J Krošlák	3	3
WC	(Slovakia) Patrik Fabian (Slovakia) N Gombos	5	3
4	(United Kingdom) K Skupski (United Kingdom) N Skupski	7	6
(Poland) M Kowalczyk (Slovakia) I Zelenay	1	4
(Finland) H Kontinen (Sweden) A Siljeström	6	6
(Croatia) F Škugor (Germany) S Stadler	6	4	[7]
2	(Slovakia) F Polášek (Czech Republic) L Rosol	4	6	[10]

Quarterfinals
1	(Czech Republic) F Čermák (Poland) Ł Kubot	7	4	[8]
(Germany) G Kretschmer (Germany) J-L Struff	5	6	[10]
3	(Russia) M Elgin (Slovakia) M Mertiňák	6	6
(Belarus) U Ignatik (Ukraine) I Marchenko	3	2
(Austria) S Bader (Austria) D Thiem	5	3
4	(United Kingdom) K Skupski (United Kingdom) N Skupski	7	6
(Finland) H Kontinen (Sweden) A Siljeström	3	7	[10]
2	(Slovakia) F Polášek (Czech Republic) L Rosol	6	5	[6]

Semifinals
(Germany) G Kretschmer (Germany) J-L Struff	6^{4}	7	[10]
3	(Russia) M Elgin (Slovakia) M Mertiňák	7^{7}	5	[6]
4	(United Kingdom) K Skupski (United Kingdom) N Skupski	5	3
(Finland) H Kontinen (Sweden) A Siljeström	7	6

Final
(Germany) G Kretschmer (Germany) J-L Struff	6^{6}	2
(Finland) H Kontinen (Sweden) A Siljeström	7^{8}	6
