= 2017 Slovak Open – Doubles =

Doubles
- 2017 Slovak Open

Final
- Champions: (United Kingdom) Ken Skupski (United Kingdom) Neal Skupski
- Runners-up: (Netherlands) Sander Arends (Croatia) Antonio Šančić
- Score: 5–7, 6–3, [10–8]

Events
Singles	Doubles
← 2016 ·	Slovak Open	· 2018 →

Ken and Neal Skupski were the defending champions and successfully defended their title, defeating Sander Arends and Antonio Šančić 5–7, 6–3, [10–8] in the final.

== Seeds ==
1. (Czech Republic) Roman Jebavý / (Netherlands) Matwé Middelkoop (quarterfinals)
2. (Chile) Hans Podlipnik-Castillo / (Belarus) Andrei Vasilevski (first round)
3. (Israel) Jonathan Erlich / (Croatia) Franko Škugor (quarterfinals)
4. (Russia) Mikhail Elgin / (India) Divij Sharan (quarterfinals)

== Draw ==
=== Key ===
- Q = Qualifier
- WC = Wild card
- LL = Lucky loser
- Alt = Alternate
- SE = Special exempt
- PR = Protected ranking
- ITF = ITF entry
- JE = Junior exempt
- w/o = Walkover
- r = Retired
- d = Defaulted
- SR = Special ranking

First round
1	(Czech Republic) R Jebavý (Netherlands) M Middelkoop	6	6
WC	(Turkey) S Ağabigün (Turkey) A Çelikbilek	1	1
(Hungary) G Borsos (Hungary) M Fucsovics	7^{11}	7^{7}
(Lithuania) R Berankis (Italy) A Seppi	6^{9}	6^{5}
4	(Russia) M Elgin (India) D Sharan	6	7^{8}
PR	(Belarus) U Ignatik (Netherlands) I Sijsling	4	6^{6}
(Netherlands) S Arends (Croatia) A Šančić	6	4	[10]
(Switzerland) L Margaroli (Austria) T-S Weissborn	4	6	[6]
(Sweden) J Brunström (Germany) K Krawietz	7^{7}	6
WC	(Slovakia) L Klein (Slovakia) Patrik Néma	6^{1}	3
(Ukraine) D Molchanov (Ukraine) S Stakhovsky	5	5
3	(Israel) J Erlich (Croatia) F Škugor	7	7
(Slovakia) N Gombos (Slovakia) L Lacko	5	6	[10]
WC	(Slovakia) J Kovalík (Slovakia) A Martin	7	3	[7]
(United Kingdom) K Skupski (United Kingdom) N Skupski	7^{7}	7^{7}
2	(Chile) H Podlipnik-Castillo (Belarus) A Vasilevski	6^{5}	6^{0}

Quarterfinals
1	(Czech Republic) R Jebavý (Netherlands) M Middelkoop	4	6^{4}
(Hungary) G Borsos (Hungary) M Fucsovics	6	7^{7}
4	(Russia) M Elgin (India) D Sharan	4	7^{9}	[4]
(Netherlands) S Arends (Croatia) A Šančić	6	6^{7}	[10]
(Sweden) J Brunström (Germany) K Krawietz	7^{7}	7^{7}
3	(Israel) J Erlich (Croatia) F Škugor	6^{2}	6^{5}
(Slovakia) N Gombos (Slovakia) L Lacko
(United Kingdom) K Skupski (United Kingdom) N Skupski	w/o

Semifinals
(Hungary) G Borsos (Hungary) M Fucsovics	5	5
(Netherlands) S Arends (Croatia) A Šančić	7	7
(Sweden) J Brunström (Germany) K Krawietz	6^{5}	4
(United Kingdom) K Skupski (United Kingdom) N Skupski	7^{7}	6

Final
(Netherlands) S Arends (Croatia) A Šančić	7	3	[8]
(United Kingdom) K Skupski (United Kingdom) N Skupski	5	6	[10]
