= 2015 Slovak Open =

- Date: 9–15 November
- Edition: 16th (ATP); 7th (ITF)
- Category: ATP Challenger Tour; ITF Women's Circuit
- Prize money: €85,000+H (ATP) $25,000 (ITF)
- Surface: Hard (indoor)
- Location: Bratislava, Slovakia

Champions

Men's singles
- (Belarus) Egor Gerasimov

Women's singles
- (Czech Republic) Jesika Malečková

Men's doubles
- (Serbia) Ilija Bozoljac / (Slovakia) Igor Zelenay

Women's doubles
- (Slovenia) Dalila Jakupović / (Germany) Anne Schäfer
← 2014 ·	Slovak Open	· 2016 →

The 2015 Slovak Open was a professional tennis tournament played on indoor hard courts. It was the 16th edition of the tournament which was part of the 2015 ATP Challenger Tour. It was also the 7th edition of the tournament which was part of the ITF Women's Circuit. It took place in Bratislava, Slovakia between 9 and 15 November 2015.

== Singles main-draw entrants ==
=== Seeds ===
Country	Player	Rank^{1}	Seed
CZE	Lukáš Rosol	66	1
UKR	Illya Marchenko	83	2
GER	Jan-Lennard Struff	104	3
SVK	Lukáš Lacko	115	4
UZB	Farrukh Dustov	129	5
SVK	Norbert Gombos	131	6
SWE	Elias Ymer	132	7
FRA	Édouard Roger-Vasselin	149	8

- ^{1} Rankings are as of November 2, 2015.

=== Other entrants ===
The following players received wildcards into the singles main draw:

- (Slovakia) Martin Blaško
- (Turkey) Altuğ Çelikbilek
- (Slovakia) Alex Molčan
- (Czech Republic) Radek Štěpánek

The following players received entry to the main draw due to a protected ranking:

- (Croatia) Ante Pavić
- (Israel) Amir Weintraub

The following players received entry from the qualifying draw:

- (Belarus) Egor Gerasimov
- (Ukraine) Danylo Kalenichenko
- (Russia) Alexey Vatutin
- (Sweden) Mikael Ymer

== Champions ==
=== Men's singles ===
- (Belarus) Egor Gerasimov def. (Slovakia) Lukáš Lacko 7–6^{(7–1)}, 7–6^{(7–5)}

=== Men's doubles ===
- (Serbia) Ilija Bozoljac / (Slovakia) Igor Zelenay def. (United Kingdom) Ken Skupski / (United Kingdom) Neal Skupski 7–6^{(7–3)}, 4–6, [10–5]

=== Women's singles ===
- (Czech Republic) Jesika Malečková def. (Ukraine) Anhelina Kalinina 4–6, 7–6^{(7–3)}, 6–4

=== Women's doubles ===
- (Slovenia) Dalila Jakupović / (Germany) Anne Schäfer def. (Slovakia) Michaela Hončová / (Slovakia) Chantal Škamlová 6–7^{(5–7)}, 6–2, [10–8]
