= 2018 Slovak Open – Singles =

Singles
- 2018 Slovak Open

Final
- Champion: (Kazakhstan) Alexander Bublik
- Runner-up: (Czech Republic) Lukáš Rosol
- Score: 6–4, 6–4

Events
Singles	Doubles
← 2017 ·	Slovak Open	· 2019 →

Lukáš Lacko was the defending champion but lost in the second round to Egor Gerasimov.

Alexander Bublik won the title after defeating Lukáš Rosol 6–4, 6–4 in the final.

== Seeds ==
1. (Slovakia) Lukáš Lacko (second round)
2. (Russia) Evgeny Donskoy (quarterfinals)
3. (Italy) Lorenzo Sonego (second round)
4. (Spain) Guillermo García López (second round)
5. (Argentina) Marco Trungelliti (first round)
6. (India) Ramkumar Ramanathan (second round)
7. (Cyprus) Marcos Baghdatis (second round)
8. (Belgium) Ruben Bemelmans (second round)

== Draw ==
=== Key ===
- Q = Qualifier
- WC = Wild card
- LL = Lucky loser
- Alt = Alternate
- SE = Special exempt
- PR = Protected ranking
- ITF = ITF entry
- JE = Junior exempt
- w/o = Walkover
- r = Retired
- d = Defaulted
- SR = Special ranking

=== Finals ===
Semifinals
(Czech Republic) Lukáš Rosol	7	7^{7}
(Austria) Dennis Novak	5	6^{1}
Q	(Kazakhstan) Alexander Bublik	7	7^{7}
(Germany) Matthias Bachinger	5	6^{4}

Final
(Czech Republic) Lukáš Rosol	4	4
Q	(Kazakhstan) Alexander Bublik	6	6

=== Top half ===
First round
1	(Slovakia) L Lacko	4	6	7
(France) S Robert	6	4	5
PR	(Belarus) E Gerasimov	6	6
Q	(Germany) D Masur	2	2
Q	(Germany) J Härteis	3	3
(Czech Republic) L Rosol	6	6
(Germany) R Molleker	4	3
8	(Belgium) R Bemelmans	6	6
4	(Spain) G García López	7^{7}	6
(Germany) D Brands	6^{5}	4
(Austria) S Ofner	6^{11}	6	6
(Italy) A Arnaboldi	7^{13}	3	4
(Austria) D Novak	6	6
WC	(Slovakia) A Molčan	4	4
Alt	(Slovakia) F Horanský	3	4
7	(Cyprus) M Baghdatis	6	6

Second round
1	(Slovakia) L Lacko	3	3
PR	(Belarus) E Gerasimov	6	6
(Czech Republic) L Rosol	4	6	7^{7}
8	(Belgium) R Bemelmans	6	3	6^{2}
4	(Spain) G García López	5	4
(Austria) S Ofner	7	6
(Austria) D Novak	6	6
7	(Cyprus) M Baghdatis	4	1

Quarterfinals
PR	(Belarus) E Gerasimov	7^{7}	3	4
(Czech Republic) L Rosol	6^{5}	6	6
(Austria) S Ofner	1	6	3
(Austria) D Novak	6	1	6

Semifinals
(Czech Republic) L Rosol	7	7^{7}
(Austria) D Novak	5	6^{1}

=== Bottom half ===
First round
5	(Argentina) M Trungelliti	2	4
(Ukraine) S Stakhovsky	6	6
WC	(Slovakia) Tomáš Líška	2	1
WC	(Slovakia) N Gombos	6	6
(Slovakia) A Martin	6	3	5
Q	(Kazakhstan) A Bublik	2	6	7
(Italy) M Donati	3	2
3	(Italy) L Sonego	6	6
6	(India) R Ramanathan	6	7
(Spain) S Gutiérrez Ferrol	3	5
(Germany) M Bachinger	6	7^{8}
WC	(Slovakia) L Klein	4	6^{6}
Alt	(Belarus) U Ignatik	6	6^{1}	6^{6}
Q	(Austria) J Rodionov	2	7^{7}	7^{8}
(Estonia) J Zopp	6^{4}	2
2	(Russia) E Donskoy	7^{7}	6

Second round
(Ukraine) S Stakhovsky	6^{6}	6	6
WC	(Slovakia) N Gombos	7^{8}	4	2
Q	(Kazakhstan) A Bublik	6	6
3	(Italy) L Sonego	4	2
6	(India) R Ramanathan	3	6	2
(Germany) M Bachinger	6	3	6
Q	(Austria) J Rodionov	7^{7}	4	6^{5}
2	(Russia) E Donskoy	6^{4}	6	7^{7}

Quarterfinals
(Ukraine) S Stakhovsky	3	6^{5}
Q	(Kazakhstan) A Bublik	6	7^{7}
(Germany) M Bachinger	6	7^{8}
2	(Russia) E Donskoy	4	6^{6}

Semifinals
Q	(Kazakhstan) A Bublik	7	7^{7}
(Germany) M Bachinger	5	6^{4}
