= 2016 Los Cabos Open =

- Date: 8–13 August
- Edition: 1st
- Category: World Tour 250
- Draw: 28S / 16D
- Prize money: $721,030
- Surface: Hard
- Location: Los Cabos, Mexico

Champions

Singles
- (Croatia) Ivo Karlović

Doubles
- (India) Purav Raja / (India) Divij Sharan
- Los Cabos Open

The 2016 Los Cabos Open (or Abierto Mexicano Los Cabos) was an ATP tennis tournament played on outdoor hard courts. It was the 1st edition of the Los Cabos Open, and part of the ATP World Tour 250 series of the 2016 ATP World Tour. It took place in Los Cabos, Mexico from August 8 through August 13, 2016. It took over from the Claro Open in Bogotá, Colombia that had been held the previous 3 years.

== Finals ==
=== Singles ===
- (Croatia) Ivo Karlović defeated (Spain) Feliciano López, 7–6^{(7–5)}, 6–2

=== Doubles ===
- (India) Purav Raja / (India) Divij Sharan defeated (Israel) Jonathan Erlich / (United Kingdom) Ken Skupski, 7–6^{(7–4)}, 7–6^{(7–3)}

== Singles main-draw entrants ==
=== Seeds ===
Country	Player	Rank^{1}	Seed
ESP	Feliciano López	19	1
AUS	Bernard Tomic	20	2
CRO	Ivo Karlović	26	3
USA	Sam Querrey	29	4
UKR	Alexandr Dolgopolov	38	5
FRA	Jérémy Chardy	39	6
ESP	Nicolás Almagro	45	7
ESP	Marcel Granollers	47	8

- Rankings are as of August 1, 2016.

=== Other entrants ===
The following players received wildcards into the singles main draw:

- (Spain) Pablo Carreño Busta
- (Mexico) Lucas Gómez
- (Mexico) Tigre Hank

The following player received entry as a special exempt:

- (United States) Reilly Opelka

The following players received entry from the qualifying draw:

- (United States) Jared Donaldson
- (United States) Noah Rubin
- (Israel) Amir Weintraub
- (Germany) Mischa Zverev

=== Withdrawals ===
Before the tournament

- (United Kingdom) Kyle Edmund → replaced by (Serbia) Dušan Lajović
- (United States) Taylor Fritz → replaced by (Argentina) Horacio Zeballos
- (France) Benoît Paire → replaced by (Ukraine) Sergiy Stakhovsky
- (France) Lucas Pouille → replaced by (United States) Tim Smyczek
- (Spain) Albert Ramos Viñolas → replaced by (Brazil) Thiago Monteiro
- (Argentina) Diego Schwartzman → replaced by (Colombia) Santiago Giraldo
- (Austria) Dominic Thiem → replaced by (United States) Austin Krajicek

=== Retirements ===
- (Serbia) Dušan Lajović
- (Ukraine) Sergiy Stakhovsky

== Doubles main-draw entrants ==
=== Seeds ===
Country	Player	Country	Player	Rank^{1}	Seed
~~ESP~~	~~Marcel Granollers~~	~~ESP~~	~~Feliciano López~~	~~50~~	~~1~~
SWE	Robert Lindstedt	PAK	Aisam-ul-Haq Qureshi	81	2
POL	Mariusz Fyrstenberg	CRO	Mate Pavić	103	3
ESP	Pablo Carreño Busta	ARG	Andrés Molteni	124	4

- Rankings are as of August 1, 2016.

=== Other entrants ===
The following pairs received wildcards into the doubles main draw:

- (Mexico) Daniel Garza / (Mexico) Tigre Hank
- (Mexico) Hans Hach / (Mexico) Luis Patiño

=== Withdrawals ===
Before the tournament

- (Spain) Marcel Granollers / (Spain) Feliciano López
- (Ukraine) Sergiy Stakhovsky (back injury)

=== Retirements ===
- (Argentina) Horacio Zeballos (back injury)
