= 2015 Slovak Open – Men's singles =

Men's singles
- 2015 Slovak Open

Final
- Champion: (Belarus) Egor Gerasimov
- Runner-up: (Slovakia) Lukáš Lacko
- Score: 7–6^{(7–1)}, 7–6^{(7–5)}

Events
Singles	men	women
Doubles	men	women
← 2014 ·	Slovak Open	· 2016 →

The 2015 Slovak Open is a professional tennis tournament played on indoor hard courts in Bratislava, Slovakia. The men's singles has been a staple of the open since its inception in 2000. Egor Gerasimov won the title, defeating Lukáš Lacko in the final 7–6^{(7–1)}, 7–6^{(7–5)} . Egor was awarded €12,250 for winning the tournament.

== Seeds ==
1. (Czech Republic) Lukáš Rosol (second round)
2. (Ukraine) Illya Marchenko (semifinals)
3. (Germany) Jan-Lennard Struff (second round)
4. (Slovakia) Lukáš Lacko (final)
5. (Uzbekistan) Farrukh Dustov (first round)
6. (Slovakia) Norbert Gombos (quarterfinals)
7. (Sweden) Elias Ymer (first round)
8. (France) Édouard Roger-Vasselin (quarterfinals)

== Draw ==
=== Key ===
- Q = Qualifier
- WC = Wild card
- LL = Lucky loser
- Alt = Alternate
- ITF = ITF entry
- PR = Protected ranking
- SR = Special ranking
- SE = Special exempt
- JE = Junior exempt
- JR = Junior Accelerator Programme entrant
- CO = College Accelerator Programme entrant
- NG = Next Gen Accelerator Program entrant
- w/o = Walkover
- r = Retired
- d = Defaulted

=== Finals ===
Semifinals
Q	(Belarus) Egor Gerasimov	7^{7}	2	6
(Romania) Marius Copil	6^{4}	6	2
4	(Slovakia) Lukáš Lacko	6	3	7^{9}
2	(Ukraine) Illya Marchenko	4	6	6^{7}

Final
Q	(Belarus) Egor Gerasimov	7^{7}	7^{7}
4	(Slovakia) Lukáš Lacko	6^{1}	6^{5}

=== Top half ===
First round
1	(Czech Republic) L Rosol	7^{16}	6
(Germany) D Brands	6^{14}	3
PR	(Israel) A Weintraub	2	1
Q	(Belarus) E Gerasimov	6	6
(Germany) P Gojowczyk	7	6
WC	(Turkey) A Çelikbilek	5	1
(Russia) A Karatsev	3	3
6	(Slovakia) N Gombos	6	6
3	(Germany) J-L Struff	7^{7}	6
(Netherlands) I Sijsling	6^{5}	4
(Romania) M Copil	6	6
Q	(Ukraine) D Kalenichenko	3	4
(Russia) M Youzhny	6	6
WC	(Slovakia) Martin Blaško	4	0
(Poland) M Przysiężny	2^{r}
8	(France) É Roger-Vasselin	4

Second round
1	(Czech Republic) L Rosol	3	6^{4}
Q	(Belarus) E Gerasimov	6	7^{7}
(Germany) P Gojowczyk	3	5
6	(Slovakia) N Gombos	6	7
3	(Germany) J-L Struff	4	3
(Romania) M Copil	6	6
(Russia) M Youzhny	4	6^{3}
8	(France) É Roger-Vasselin	6	7^{7}

Quarterfinals
Q	(Belarus) E Gerasimov	7^{7}	6^{12}	7^{7}
6	(Slovakia) N Gombos	6^{2}	7^{14}	6^{5}
(Romania) M Copil	7^{7}	5	6
8	(France) É Roger-Vasselin	6^{5}	7	3

Semifinals
Q	(Belarus) E Gerasimov	7^{7}	2	6
(Romania) M Copil	6^{4}	6	2

=== Bottom half ===
First round
5	(Uzbekistan) F Dustov	3	4
Q	(Russia) A Vatutin	6	6
(Kazakhstan) A Nedovyesov	1	6^{7}
(Ukraine) A Smirnov	6	7^{9}
(Czech Republic) A Pavlásek	4	0^{r}
(Russia) A Rublev	6	0
Q	(Sweden) M Ymer	4	2
4	(Slovakia) L Lacko	6	6
7	(Sweden) E Ymer	4	6^{5}
WC	(Czech Republic) R Štěpánek	6	7^{7}
(Belarus) U Ignatik	4	6	6
WC	(Slovakia) A Molčan	6	3	3
(Slovakia) J Kovalík	7^{7}	6^{8}	4
(Czech Republic) J Šátral	6^{3}	7^{10}	6
PR	(Croatia) A Pavić	6^{6}	4
2	(Ukraine) I Marchenko	7^{8}	6

Second round
Q	(Russia) A Vatutin	3	7^{8}	7^{7}
(Ukraine) A Smirnov	6	6^{6}	6^{1}
(Russia) A Rublev	7^{7}	6^{1}	4
4	(Slovakia) L Lacko	6^{5}	7^{7}	6
WC	(Czech Republic) R Štěpánek	6	6
(Belarus) U Ignatik	3	4
(Czech Republic) J Šátral	4	4
2	(Ukraine) I Marchenko	6	6

Quarterfinals
Q	(Russia) A Vatutin	2	2
4	(Slovakia) L Lacko	6	6
WC	(Czech Republic) R Štěpánek	6	4	3
2	(Ukraine) I Marchenko	4	6	6

Semifinals
4	(Slovakia) L Lacko	6	3	7^{9}
2	(Ukraine) I Marchenko	4	6	6^{7}
