= 2013 Slovak Open =

- Date: 4–10 November
- Edition: 14th
- Surface: Hard (indoor)
- Location: Bratislava, Slovakia

Champions

Singles
- (Slovakia) Lukáš Lacko

Doubles
- (Finland) Henri Kontinen / (Sweden) Andreas Siljeström
← 2012 ·	Slovak Open	· 2014 →

The 2013 Slovak Open was a professional tennis tournament played on indoor hard courts. It was the 14th edition of the tournament which was part of the 2013 ATP Challenger Tour. It took place in Bratislava, Slovakia between 4 and 10 November 2013.

== Singles main-draw entrants ==
=== Seeds ===
Country	Player	Rank^{1}	Seed
CZE	Lukáš Rosol	44	1
AUS	Bernard Tomic	55	2
NED	Igor Sijsling	70	3
SVK	Lukáš Lacko	74	4
POL	Łukasz Kubot	76	5
CZE	Jiří Veselý	88	6
FRA	Kenny de Schepper	92	7
UKR	Sergiy Stakhovsky	103	8

- ^{1} Rankings are as of October 28, 2013.

=== Other entrants ===
The following players received wildcards into the singles main draw:

- (Slovakia) Filip Horanský
- (Slovakia) Miloslav Mečíř Jr.
- (Czech Republic) Lukáš Rosol
- (Slovakia) Adrian Sikora

The following players received entry from the qualifying draw:

- (Poland) Marcin Gawron
- (Belarus) Uladzimir Ignatik
- (Serbia) Boris Pašanski
- (Croatia) Ante Pavić

== Champions ==
=== Singles ===
- (Slovakia) Lukáš Lacko def. (Czech Republic) Lukáš Rosol 6–4, 4–6, 6–4

=== Doubles ===
- (Finland) Henri Kontinen / (Sweden) Andreas Siljeström def. (Germany) Gero Kretschmer / (Germany) Jan-Lennard Struff 7–6^{(8–6)}, 6–2
