= 2016 Los Cabos Open – Doubles =

Doubles
- 2016 Los Cabos Open

Final
- Champions: (India) Purav Raja (India) Divij Sharan
- Runners-up: (Israel) Jonathan Erlich (United Kingdom) Ken Skupski
- Score: 7–6^{(7–4)}, 7–6^{(7–3)}

Details
- Draw: 16
- Seeds: 4

Events
Singles	Doubles
Los Cabos Open	· 2017 →

This was the first edition of the tournament.

Purav Raja and Divij Sharan won the title, defeating Jonathan Erlich and Ken Skupski in the final, 7–6^{(7–4)}, 7–6^{(7–3)}.

== Seeds ==
1. (Spain) Marcel Granollers / (Spain) Feliciano López (withdrew)
2. (Sweden) Robert Lindstedt / (Pakistan) Aisam-ul-Haq Qureshi (first round)
3. (Poland) Mariusz Fyrstenberg / (Croatia) Mate Pavić (quarterfinals)
4. (Spain) Pablo Carreño Busta / (Argentina) Andrés Molteni (quarterfinals)

== Draw ==
=== Key ===
- Q = Qualifier
- WC = Wild card
- LL = Lucky loser
- Alt = Alternate
- SE = Special exempt
- PR = Protected ranking
- ITF = ITF entry
- JE = Junior exempt
- w/o = Walkover
- r = Retired
- d = Defaulted
- SR = Special ranking

=== Draw ===
First round
1	(Spain) M Granollers (Spain) F López
(India) P Raja (India) D Sharan	w/o
(United States) N Monroe (New Zealand) A Sitak	2
(Spain) G García-López (Argentina) H Zeballos	1^{r}
4	(Spain) P Carreño Busta (Argentina) A Molteni	7	6
WC	(Mexico) D Garza (Mexico) T Hank	5	2
(United Kingdom) J Marray (Canada) A Shamasdin	7	6
(United States) A Krajicek (Brazil) T Monteiro	5	2
(Israel) J Erlich (United Kingdom) K Skupski	2	6	[13]
(Sweden) J Brunström (Sweden) A Siljeström	6	0	[11]
(Ukraine) A Dolgopolov (Ukraine) S Stakhovsky
3	(Poland) M Fyrstenberg (Croatia) M Pavić	w/o
WC	(Mexico) H Hach (Mexico) L Patiño	4	4
(Spain) N Almagro (Brazil) M Demoliner	6	6
(Spain) D Marrero (Spain) F Verdasco	7^{8}	6
2	(Sweden) R Lindstedt (Pakistan) A-u-H Qureshi	6^{6}	3

Quarterfinals
(India) P Raja (India) D Sharan	1	6	[10]
(United States) N Monroe (New Zealand) A Sitak	6	3	[7]
4	(Spain) P Carreño Busta (Argentina) A Molteni	5	4
(United Kingdom) J Marray (Canada) A Shamasdin	7	6
(Israel) J Erlich (United Kingdom) K Skupski	6	1	[10]
3	(Poland) M Fyrstenberg (Croatia) M Pavić	4	6	[5]
(Spain) N Almagro (Brazil) M Demoliner	2	4
(Spain) D Marrero (Spain) F Verdasco	6	6

Semifinals
(India) P Raja (India) D Sharan	6	6
(United Kingdom) J Marray (Canada) A Shamasdin	4	4
(Israel) J Erlich (United Kingdom) K Skupski	4	6	[11]
(Spain) D Marrero (Spain) F Verdasco	6	3	[9]

Final
(India) P Raja (India) D Sharan	7^{7}	7^{7}
(Israel) J Erlich (United Kingdom) K Skupski	6^{4}	6^{3}
