= 2018 Slovak Open =

- Date: 5–11 November
- Edition: 19th
- Category: ATP Challenger Tour
- Surface: Hard (indoor)
- Location: Bratislava, Slovakia

Champions

Singles
- (Kazakhstan) Alexander Bublik

Doubles
- (Ukraine) Denys Molchanov / (Slovakia) Igor Zelenay
← 2017 ·	Slovak Open	· 2019 →

The 2018 Slovak Open was a professional tennis tournament played on indoor hard courts. It was the 19th edition of the tournament which was part of the 2018 ATP Challenger Tour. It took place in Bratislava, Slovakia between 5 and 11 November 2018.

== Singles main-draw entrants ==
=== Seeds ===
Country	Player	Rank^{1}	Seed
SVK	Lukáš Lacko	82	1
RUS	Evgeny Donskoy	100	2
ITA	Lorenzo Sonego	105	3
ESP	Guillermo García López	106	4
ARG	Marco Trungelliti	118	5
IND	Ramkumar Ramanathan	121	6
CYP	Marcos Baghdatis	127	7
BEL	Ruben Bemelmans	129	8

- ^{1} Rankings are as of 29 October 2018.

=== Other entrants ===
The following players received wildcards into the singles main draw:

- (Slovakia) Norbert Gombos
- (Slovakia) Lukáš Klein
- (Slovakia) Tomáš Líška
- (Slovakia) Alex Molčan

The following player received entry into the singles main draw using a protected ranking:

- (Belarus) Egor Gerasimov

The following players received entry into the singles main draw as alternates:

- (Slovakia) Filip Horanský
- (Belarus) Uladzimir Ignatik

The following players received entry from the qualifying draw:

- (Kazakhstan) Alexander Bublik
- (Germany) Johannes Härteis
- (Germany) Daniel Masur
- (Austria) Jurij Rodionov

== Champions ==
=== Singles ===
- (Kazakhstan) Alexander Bublik def. (Czech Republic) Lukáš Rosol 6–4, 6–4.

=== Doubles ===
- (Ukraine) Denys Molchanov / (Slovakia) Igor Zelenay def. (India) Ramkumar Ramanathan / (Belarus) Andrei Vasilevski 6–2, 3–6, [11–9].
