= 2013 Slovak Open – Singles =

Singles
- 2013 Slovak Open

Final
- Champion: (Slovakia) Lukáš Lacko
- Runner-up: (Czech Republic) Lukáš Rosol
- Score: 6–4, 4–6, 6–4

Events
Singles	Doubles
- Slovak Open

Lukáš Rosol was the defending champion but lost to Lukáš Lacko in the final.

== Seeds ==
1. (Czech Republic) Lukáš Rosol (final)
2. (Australia) Bernard Tomic (first round)
3. (Netherlands) Igor Sijsling (semifinals)
4. (Slovakia) Lukáš Lacko (champion)
5. (Poland) Łukasz Kubot (second round)
6. (Czech Republic) Jiří Veselý (second round)
7. (France) Kenny de Schepper (quarterfinals)
8. (Ukraine) Sergiy Stakhovsky (quarterfinals)

== Draw ==
Key

- Q = Qualifier
- WC = Wild card
- LL = Lucky loser
- Alt = Alternate
- ITF = ITF entry
- PR = Protected ranking
- SR = Special ranking
- SE = Special exempt
- JE = Junior exempt
- JR = Junior Accelerator Programme entrant
- CO = College Accelerator Programme entrant
- NG = Next Gen Accelerator Program entrant
- w/o = Walkover
- r = Retired
- d = Defaulted

=== Finals ===
Semifinals
1/WC	(Czech Republic) Lukáš Rosol	7^{7}	3	7^{7}
3	(Netherlands) Igor Sijsling	6^{5}	6	6^{2}
4	(Slovakia) Lukáš Lacko	6	1	6
(Germany) Jan-Lennard Struff	4	6	3

Final
1/WC	(Czech Republic) Lukáš Rosol	4	6	4
4	(Slovakia) Lukáš Lacko	6	4	6

=== Top half ===
First round
1/WC	(Czech Republic) L Rosol	6	6
(Austria) G Melzer	0	1
Q	(Croatia) A Pavić	6	7^{7}
(Germany) B Phau	3	6^{4}
(Slovakia) M Kližan	3^{r}
(Romania) A Ungur	5
Q	(Belarus) U Ignatik	3	2
5	(Poland) Ł Kubot	6	6
3	(Netherlands) I Sijsling	6	6
(Austria) D Thiem	3	4
Q	(Poland) M Gawron	5	3
(Lithuania) R Berankis	7	6
(Czech Republic) J Hájek	4	6^{9}
WC	(Slovakia) Adrian Sikora	6	7^{11}
WC	(Slovakia) F Horanský	7^{7}	2	5
7	(France) K de Schepper	6^{4}	6	7

Second round
1/WC	(Czech Republic) L Rosol	5	6	7^{12}
Q	(Croatia) A Pavić	7	4	6^{10}
(Romania) A Ungur	5	7	7^{10}
5	(Poland) Ł Kubot	7	5	6^{8}
3	(Netherlands) I Sijsling	4	6	6
(Lithuania) R Berankis	6	2	2
WC	(Slovakia) A Sikora	6^{2}	4
7	(France) K de Schepper	7^{7}	6

Quarterfinals
1/WC	(Czech Republic) L Rosol	6	6
(Romania) A Ungur	2	2
3	(Netherlands) I Sijsling	7^{7}	6
7	(France) K de Schepper	6^{1}	3

Semifinals
1/WC	(Czech Republic) L Rosol	7^{7}	3	7^{7}
3	(Netherlands) I Sijsling	6^{5}	6	6^{2}

=== Bottom half ===
First round
6	(Czech Republic) J Veselý	4	6	6
(France) L Pouille	6	3	4
(Bosnia and Herzegovina) D Džumhur	6	6
(Germany) A Beck	3	4
WC	(Slovakia) M Mečíř	1	7^{7}	7
Q	(Serbia) B Pašanski	6	6^{5}	5
(Slovakia) N Gomboš	2	4
4	(Slovakia) L Lacko	6	6
8	(Ukraine) S Stakhovsky	7	6
(Slovakia) A Martin	5	4
(Austria) A Haider-Maurer	6	3	6^{3}
(Romania) M Copil	2	6	7^{7}
(Germany) J-L Struff	6	7
(Turkey) M İlhan	2	5
(Ukraine) I Marchenko	6	6
2	(Australia) B Tomic	4	2

Second round
6	(Czech Republic) J Veselý	3	6	1
(Bosnia and Herzegovina) D Džumhur	6	3	6
WC	(Slovakia) M Mečíř	6	5	4
4	(Slovakia) L Lacko	3	7	6
8	(Ukraine) S Stakhovsky	6	6
(Romania) M Copil	4	4
(Germany) J-L Struff	6	7
(Ukraine) I Marchenko	3	5

Quarterfinals
(Bosnia and Herzegovina) D Džumhur	4	3
4	(Slovakia) L Lacko	6	6
8	(Ukraine) S Stakhovsky	6	1	6^{3}
(Germany) J-L Struff	4	6	7^{7}

Semifinals
4	(Slovakia) L Lacko	6	1	6
(Germany) J-L Struff	4	6	3
