= 2014 Slovak Open =

- Date: 3–9 November
- Edition: 15th
- Surface: Hard (indoor)
- Location: Bratislava, Slovakia

Champions

Singles
- (Germany) Peter Gojowczyk

Doubles
- (United Kingdom) Ken Skupski / (United Kingdom) Neal Skupski
← 2013 ·	Slovak Open	· 2015 →

The 2014 Slovak Open was a professional tennis tournament played on indoor hard courts. It was the 15th edition of the tournament which was part of the 2014 ATP Challenger Tour. It took place in Bratislava, Slovakia between 3 and 9 November 2014.

== Singles main-draw entrants ==
=== Seeds ===
Country	Player	Rank^{1}	Seed
CZE	Jiří Veselý	70	1
SVK	Lukáš Lacko	79	2
RUS	Andrey Kuznetsov	81	3
NED	Igor Sijsling	85	4
SRB	Filip Krajinović	95	5
BIH	Damir Džumhur	101	6
GER	Peter Gojowczyk	106	7
SRB	Viktor Troicki	108	8

- ^{1} Rankings are as of October 27, 2014.

=== Other entrants ===
The following players received wildcards into the singles main draw:

- (Slovakia) Filip Horanský
- (Slovakia) Jozef Kovalík
- (Slovakia) Miloslav Mečíř Jr.
- (Czech Republic) Adam Pavlásek

The following players received entry from the qualifying draw:

- (Germany) Yannick Maden
- (Slovakia) Adrian Sikora
- (Czech Republic) Pavel Štaubert
- (Croatia) Filip Veger

== Champions ==
=== Singles ===
- (Germany) Peter Gojowczyk def. (Uzbekistan) Farrukh Dustov 7–6^{(7–2)}, 6–3

=== Doubles ===
- (United Kingdom) Ken Skupski / (United Kingdom) Neal Skupski def. (Slovakia) Norbert Gombos / (Czech Republic) Adam Pavlásek 6–3, 7–6^{(7–3)}
