= 2016 Los Cabos Open – Singles =

Singles
- 2016 Los Cabos Open

Final
- Champion: (Croatia) Ivo Karlović
- Runner-up: (Spain) Feliciano López
- Score: 7–6^{(7–5)}, 6–2

Details
- Draw: 28
- Seeds: 8

Events
Singles	Doubles
- Los Cabos Open

This was the first edition of the tournament.

Ivo Karlović won the title, defeating Feliciano López in the final, 7–6^{(7–5)}, 6–2.

== Seeds ==
The top four seeds receive a bye into the second round.

1. (Spain) Feliciano López (final)
2. (Australia) Bernard Tomic (second round)
3. (Croatia) Ivo Karlović (champion)
4. (United States) Sam Querrey (second round)
5. (Ukraine) Alexandr Dolgopolov (first round)
6. (France) Jérémy Chardy (first round)
7. (Spain) Nicolás Almagro (quarterfinals)
8. (Spain) Marcel Granollers (quarterfinals)

== Draw ==
Key

- Q = Qualifier
- WC = Wild card
- LL = Lucky loser
- Alt = Alternate
- ITF = ITF entry
- PR = Protected ranking
- SR = Special ranking
- SE = Special exempt
- JE = Junior exempt
- JR = Junior Accelerator Programme entrant
- CO = College Accelerator Programme entrant
- NG = Next Gen Accelerator Program entrant
- w/o = Walkover
- r = Retired
- d = Defaulted

=== Finals ===
Semifinals
1	(Spain) Feliciano López	2	6	6
WC	(Spain) Pablo Carreño Busta	6	3	3
3	(Croatia) Ivo Karlović	6	1
(Serbia) Dušan Lajović	2	1^{r}

Final
1	(Spain) Feliciano López	6^{5}	2
3	(Croatia) Ivo Karlović	7^{7}	6

=== Top half ===
First round
SE	(United States) R Opelka	7^{8}	3
(Ukraine) S Stakhovsky	6^{6}	1^{r}
Q	(United States) J Donaldson	6	6^{4}	2
PR	(France) J Benneteau	4	7^{7}	6
(Argentina) H Zeballos	6	6
5	(Ukraine) A Dolgopolov	3	3
(Colombia) S Giraldo	6	6
Q	(Israel) A Weintraub	4	4
WC	(Mexico) T Hank	6^{2}	3
(United States) A Krajicek	7^{7}	6
WC	(Spain) P Carreño Busta	6	7^{8}
6	(France) J Chardy	4	6^{6}

Second round
1	(Spain) F López	6	7^{7}
SE	(United States) R Opelka	3	6^{3}
PR	(France) J Benneteau	6	6^{1}	6
(Argentina) H Zeballos	1	7^{7}	1
4	(United States) S Querrey	6^{1}	3
(Colombia) S Giraldo	7^{7}	6
(United States) A Krajicek	0	3
WC	(Spain) P Carreño Busta	6	6

Quarterfinals
1	(Spain) F López	6	6
PR	(France) J Benneteau	3	4
(Colombia) S Giraldo	7^{7}	6^{2}	3
WC	(Spain) P Carreño Busta	6^{4}	7^{7}	6

Semifinals
1	(Spain) F López	2	6	6
WC	(Spain) P Carreño Busta	6	3	3

=== Bottom half ===
First round
8	(Spain) M Granollers	7^{8}	6
(Spain) F Verdasco	6^{6}	2
(United States) T Smyczek	6	2	0
(Germany) T Kamke	2	6	6
Q	(Germany) M Zverev	6	6
(France) A Mannarino	1	1
7	(Spain) N Almagro	6	3	6
Q	(United States) N Rubin	2	6	3
WC	(Mexico) L Gómez	0	1
(Spain) G García López	6	6
(Serbia) D Lajović	6	6
(Brazil) T Monteiro	3	4

Second round
8	(Spain) M Granollers	7^{7}	6
(Germany) T Kamke	6^{2}	2
Q	(Germany) M Zverev	3	6	3
3	(Croatia) I Karlović	6	3	6
7	(Spain) N Almagro	7^{7}	6
(Spain) G García López	6^{4}	3
(Serbia) D Lajović	7^{7}	3	6
2	(Australia) B Tomic	6^{4}	6	4

Quarterfinals
8	(Spain) M Granollers	6	6^{3}	1
3	(Croatia) I Karlović	2	7^{7}	6
7	(Spain) N Almagro	5	6^{5}
(Serbia) D Lajović	7	7^{7}

Semifinals
3	(Croatia) I Karlović	6	1
(Serbia) D Lajović	2	1^{r}

== Qualifying ==
=== Seeds ===
1. (United States) Jared Donaldson (qualified)
2. (Germany) Mischa Zverev (qualified)
3. (United States) Noah Rubin (qualified)
4. (Israel) Amir Weintraub (qualified)
5. (United States) Alexander Sarkissian (qualifying competition)
6. (Colombia) Alejandro Falla (qualifying competition)
7. (Argentina) Juan Ignacio Londero (qualifying competition)
8. (Mexico) Manuel Sánchez (qualifying competition)

=== Qualifiers ===
1. (United States) Jared Donaldson
2. (Germany) Mischa Zverev
3. (United States) Noah Rubin
4. (Israel) Amir Weintraub

=== Qualifying draw ===
==== First qualifier ====
First round
1	(United States) Jared Donaldson	4	2
Alt	(Sweden) Robert Lindstedt	6	1^{r}
(United States) Andrew Carter	4	3
6	(Colombia) Alejandro Falla	6	6

Qualifying competition
1	(United States) Jared Donaldson	6	6
6	(Colombia) Alejandro Falla	2	3

==== Second qualifier ====
First round
2	(Germany) Mischa Zverev	6	6^{5}	6
(Croatia) Mate Pavić	4	7^{7}	3
Alt	(Mexico) Luis Patiño	1	3
5	(United States) Alexander Sarkissian	6	6

Qualifying competition
2	(Germany) Mischa Zverev	6	6
5	(United States) Alexander Sarkissian	1	2

==== Third qualifier ====
First round
3	(United States) Noah Rubin	6	6
WC	(Mexico) Fernando Cabrera	0	2
WC	(Mexico) Juan Ignacio Batalla	1	7^{7}	1
8/Alt	(Mexico) Manuel Sánchez	6	6^{2}	6

Qualifying competition
3	(United States) Noah Rubin	6	3	6
8/Alt	(Mexico) Manuel Sánchez	4	6	4

==== Fourth qualifier ====
First round
4	(Israel) Amir Weintraub	7^{7}	6
(Mexico) Daniel Garza	6^{4}	0
Alt	(Mexico) Carlos Ramírez Utermann	5	2
7	(Argentina) Juan Ignacio Londero	7	6

Qualifying competition
4	(Israel) Amir Weintraub	7	6
7	(Argentina) Juan Ignacio Londero	5	1
