= 2015 Slovak Open – Men's doubles =

Men's doubles
- 2015 Slovak Open

Final
- Champion: (Serbia) Ilija Bozoljac (Slovakia) Igor Zelenay
- Runner-up: (United Kingdom) Ken Skupski (United Kingdom) Neal Skupski
- Score: 7–6^{(7–3)}, 4–6, [10–5]

Events
Singles	men	women
Doubles	men	women
- Slovak Open

Ilija Bozoljac and Igor Zelenay won the title, defeating defending champions Ken Skupski and Neal Skupski in the final 7–6^{(7–3)}, 4–6, [10–5] .

== Seeds ==
1. (United Kingdom) Jonathan Marray / (Croatia) Mate Pavić (first round)
2. (Netherlands) Wesley Koolhof / (Netherlands) Matwé Middelkoop (first round)
3. (Czech Republic) František Čermák / (New Zealand) Marcus Daniell (first round)
4. (Belarus) Sergey Betov / (Russia) Andrey Rublev (first round)

== Draw ==
Key

- Q = Qualifier
- WC = Wild card
- LL = Lucky loser
- Alt = Alternate
- ITF = ITF entry
- PR = Protected ranking
- SR = Special ranking
- SE = Special exempt
- JE = Junior exempt
- JR = Junior Accelerator Programme entrant
- CO = College Accelerator Programme entrant
- NG = Next Gen Accelerator Program entrant
- w/o = Walkover
- r = Retired
- d = Defaulted

=== Draw ===
First round
1	(United Kingdom) J Marray (Croatia) M Pavić	7^{7}	6^{4}	[3]
(United Kingdom) K Skupski (United Kingdom) N Skupski	6^{2}	7^{7}	[10]
(Slovakia) N Gombos (Czech Republic) A Pavlásek	7^{7}	7^{7}
WC	(Turkey) S Ağabigün (Turkey) A Çelikbilek	6^{4}	6^{5}
3	(Czech Republic) F Čermák (New Zealand) M Daniell	6	3	[8]
PR	(Kazakhstan) A Nedovyesov (Croatia) A Pavić	4	6	[10]
(Poland) M Kowalczyk (Croatia) D Marcan	3	6	[10]
Alt	(Ukraine) Vitalii Shcherba (Ukraine) Vadym Ursu	6	0	[2]
(Uzbekistan) F Dustov (Netherlands) I Sijsling	7^{7}	7
WC	(Slovakia) Martin Blaško (Slovakia) Patrik Fabian	6^{4}	5
(Poland) M Fyrstenberg (Poland) M Przysiężny	4	7^{7}	[10]
4	(Belarus) S Betov (Russia) A Rublev	6	6^{3}	[7]
(Serbia) I Bozoljac (Slovakia) I Zelenay	6	6
WC	(Slovakia) L Klein (Slovakia) A Molčan	4	2
(Czech Republic) J Šátral (Ukraine) A Smirnov	7	6
2	(Netherlands) W Koolhof (Netherlands) M Middelkoop	5	1

Quarterfinals
(United Kingdom) K Skupski (United Kingdom) N Skupski	w/o
(Slovakia) N Gombos (Czech Republic) A Pavlásek
PR	(Kazakhstan) A Nedovyesov (Croatia) A Pavić	6^{9}	7	[7]
(Poland) M Kowalczyk (Croatia) D Marcan	7^{11}	5	[10]
(Uzbekistan) F Dustov (Netherlands) I Sijsling	6^{1}	3
(Poland) M Fyrstenberg (Poland) M Przysiężny	7^{7}	6
(Serbia) I Bozoljac (Slovakia) I Zelenay	6	6
(Czech Republic) J Šátral (Ukraine) A Smirnov	4	2

Semifinals
(United Kingdom) K Skupski (United Kingdom) N Skupski	6	7^{8}
(Poland) M Kowalczyk (Croatia) D Marcan	2	6^{6}
(Poland) M Fyrstenberg (Poland) M Przysiężny	4	2
(Serbia) I Bozoljac (Slovakia) I Zelenay	6	6

Final
(United Kingdom) K Skupski (United Kingdom) N Skupski	6^{3}	6	[5]
(Serbia) I Bozoljac (Slovakia) I Zelenay	7^{7}	4	[10]
