= 2017 Slovak Open =

- Date: 6–12 November
- Edition: 18th
- Category: ATP Challenger Tour
- Surface: Hard (indoor)
- Location: Bratislava, Slovakia

Champions

Singles
- (Slovakia) Lukáš Lacko

Doubles
- (United Kingdom) Ken Skupski / (United Kingdom) Neal Skupski
← 2016 ·	Slovak Open	· 2018 →

The 2017 Slovak Open was a professional tennis tournament played on indoor hard courts. It was the 18th edition of the tournament which was part of the 2017 ATP Challenger Tour. It took place in Bratislava, Slovakia between 6 and 12 November 2017.

== Singles main-draw entrants ==
=== Seeds ===
Country	Player	Rank^{1}	Seed
KAZ	Mikhail Kukushkin	79	1
HUN	Márton Fucsovics	84	2
ITA	Andreas Seppi	85	3
ROU	Marius Copil	92	4
CYP	Marcos Baghdatis	93	5
UKR	Sergiy Stakhovsky	104	6
SVK	Norbert Gombos	110	7
SVK	Lukáš Lacko	125	8

- ^{1} Rankings are as of 30 October 2017.

=== Other entrants ===
The following players received wildcards into the singles main draw:

- (Slovakia) Lukáš Klein
- (Slovakia) Tomáš Líška
- (Kazakhstan) Aleksandr Nedovyesov
- (Slovakia) Patrik Néma

The following player received entry into the singles main draw using a protected ranking:

- (Netherlands) Igor Sijsling

The following player received entry into the singles main draw as an alternate:

- (Serbia) Peđa Krstin

The following players received entry from the qualifying draw:

- (Belgium) Niels Desein
- (United Kingdom) Tom Farquharson
- (Poland) Kamil Majchrzak
- (Croatia) Franko Škugor

The following player received entry as a lucky loser:

- (Italy) Matteo Viola

== Champions ==
=== Singles ===
- (Slovakia) Lukáš Lacko def. (Romania) Marius Copil 6–4, 7–6^{(7–4)}.

=== Doubles ===
- (United Kingdom) Ken Skupski / (United Kingdom) Neal Skupski def. (Netherlands) Sander Arends / (Croatia) Antonio Šančić 5–7, 6–3, [10–8].
