= 2016 Slovak Open =

- Date: 7–13 November
- Edition: 17th (ATP); 8th (ITF)
- Category: ATP Challenger Tour; ITF Women's Circuit
- Prize money: €85,000+H (ATP) $25,000 (ITF)
- Surface: Hard (indoor)
- Location: Bratislava, Slovakia

Champions

Men's singles
- (Slovakia) Norbert Gombos

Women's singles
- (Romania) Andreea Mitu

Men's doubles
- (United Kingdom) Ken Skupski / (United Kingdom) Neal Skupski

Women's doubles
- (United Kingdom) Jocelyn Rae / (United Kingdom) Anna Smith
← 2015 ·	Slovak Open	· 2017 →

The 2016 Slovak Open was a professional tennis tournament played on indoor hard courts. It was the 17th edition of the tournament which was part of the 2016 ATP Challenger Tour. It was also the 8th edition of the tournament which was part of the ITF Women's Circuit. It took place in Bratislava, Slovakia between 7 and 13 November 2016.

== Men's singles main-draw entrants ==
=== Seeds ===
Country	Player	Rank^{1}	Seed
GER	Florian Mayer	52	1
UKR	Illya Marchenko	69	2
CZE	Adam Pavlásek	83	3
GER	Jan-Lennard Struff	91	4
CZE	Lukáš Rosol	106	5
RUS	Daniil Medvedev	108	6
SVK	Lukáš Lacko	113	7
SVK	Jozef Kovalík	120	8

- ^{1} Rankings are as of October 31, 2016.

=== Other entrants ===
The following players received wildcards into the singles main draw:

- (Slovakia) Lukáš Klein
- (Slovakia) Tomáš Líška
- (Slovakia) Alex Molčan
- (Slovakia) Patrik Néma

The following player received entry to the main draw using a protected ranking:

- (Germany) Cedrik-Marcel Stebe

The following players received entry from the qualifying draw:

- (Slovakia) Patrik Fabian
- (Slovakia) Filip Horanský
- (Czech Republic) Petr Michnev
- (Austria) Sebastian Ofner

== Women's singles main-draw entrants ==
=== Seeds ===
Country	Player	Rank^{1}	Seed
CZE	Denisa Allertová	93	1
SVK	Rebecca Šramková	121	2
BUL	Isabella Shinikova	137	3
GER	Tamara Korpatsch	165	4
NED	Arantxa Rus	176	5
CZE	Tereza Smitková	183	6
ROU	Andreea Mitu	212	7
CZE	Jesika Malečková	218	8

- ^{1} Rankings are as of October 31, 2016.

=== Other entrants ===
The following players received wildcards into the singles main draw:

- (Czech Republic) Magdaléna Pantůčková
- (Slovakia) Kristína Schmiedlová
- (Slovakia) Chantal Škamlová
- (Slovakia) Natália Vajdová

The following players received entry from the qualifying draw:

- (Poland) Maja Chwalińska
- (Slovakia) Lenka Juríková
- (Latvia) Diāna Marcinkēviča
- (Czech Republic) Barbora Miklová
- (Croatia) Silvia Njirić
- (Russia) Anastasia Pribylova
- (Netherlands) Bibiane Schoofs
- (Belgium) Kimberley Zimmermann

== Champions ==
=== Men's singles ===
- (Slovakia) Norbert Gombos def. (Romania) Marius Copil, 7–6^{(10–8)}, 4–6, 6–3

=== Women's singles ===
- (Romania) Andreea Mitu def. (Czech Republic) Denisa Allertová, 6–2, 6–3

=== Men's doubles ===
- (United Kingdom) Ken Skupski / (United Kingdom) Neal Skupski def. (India) Purav Raja / (India) Divij Sharan, 4–6, 6–3, [10–5]

=== Women's doubles ===
- (United Kingdom) Jocelyn Rae / (United Kingdom) Anna Smith def. (Netherlands) Quirine Lemoine / (Netherlands) Eva Wacanno, 6–3, 6–2
