= Ken Skupski =

British tennis player (born 1983)

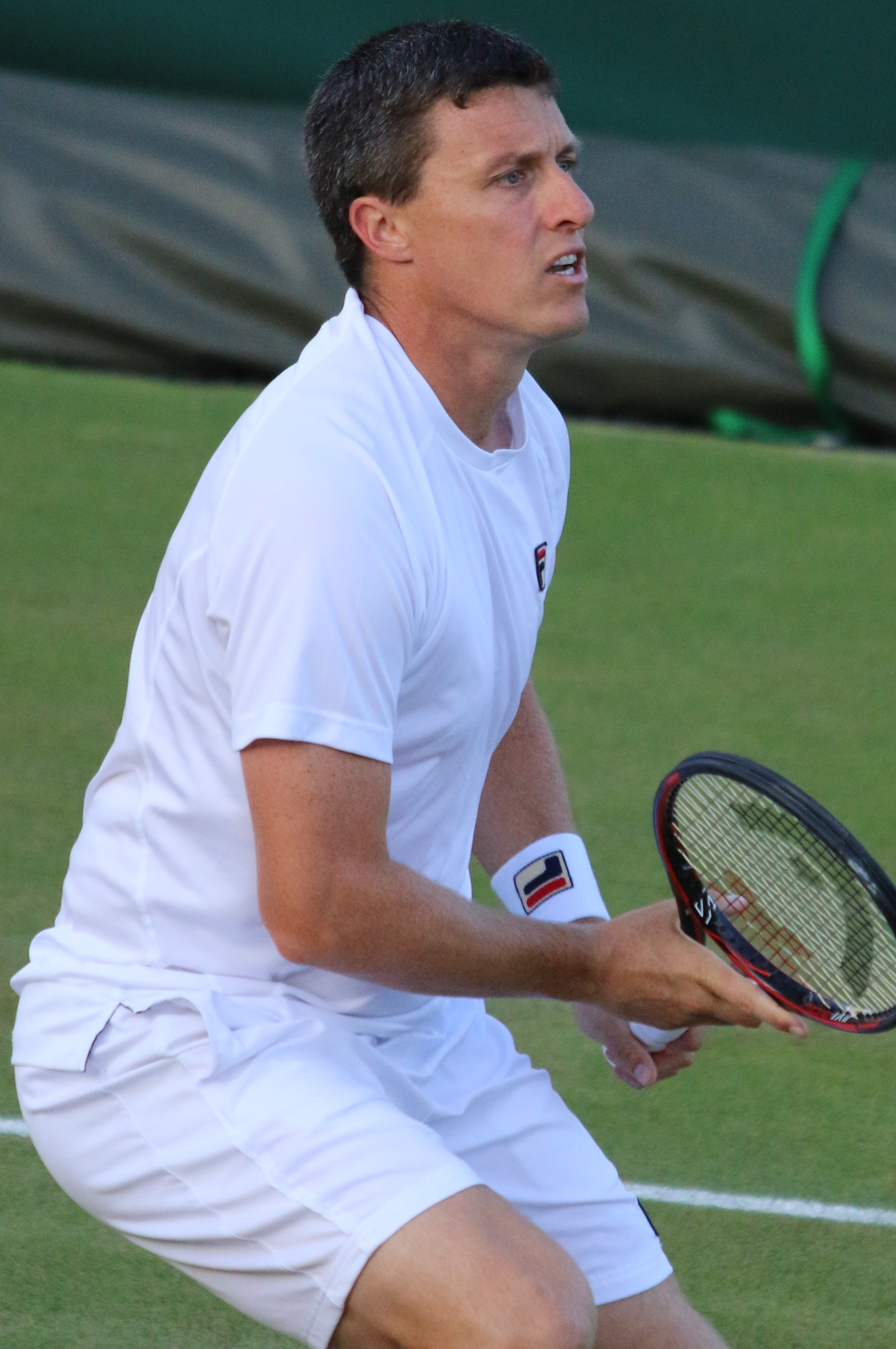
- Ken Skupski playing at Wimbledon 2017
- Country (sports): (United Kingdom) Great Britain; England
- Residence: Liverpool, England
- Born: 9 April 1983 (age 43) Liverpool, England
- Height: 1.85 m (6 ft 1 in)
- Turned pro: 2001
- Retired: 4 July 2022
- Plays: Left-handed (two-handed backhand)
- College: LSU
- Prize money: $1,100,642

Singles
- Career record: 0–0
- Career titles: 0
- Highest ranking: No. 527 (23 June 2008)

Grand Slam singles results
- Wimbledon: Q1 (2008)

Doubles
- Career record: 137–150 (ATP (World) Tour and Grand Slam main draw matches, and in Davis Cup)
- Career titles: 7
- Highest ranking: No. 44 (12 July 2010)

Grand Slam doubles results
- Australian Open: QF (2020)
- French Open: 2R (2010, 2018, 2019)
- Wimbledon: QF (2017)
- US Open: 3R (2012)

Mixed doubles
- Career titles: 0

Grand Slam mixed doubles results
- Wimbledon: QF (2017)
- US Open: 1R (2019)

Team competitions
- Davis Cup: Europe/Africa Zone Group II; 1R (2010)
Medal record
Representing England
Commonwealth Games
Silver medal – second place	2010 Delhi	Men's Doubles
Bronze medal – third place	2010 Delhi	Mixed Doubles
- Last updated on: 11 July 2022.

Ken Skupski Jr. (born 9 April 1983) is a British former professional tennis player who specialised in doubles.

He reached his career-high ATP doubles ranking of world No. 44 in July 2010, and won seven titles on the ATP Tour, most notably the 2021 Mexican Open alongside younger brother Neal Skupski, with whom he regularly competed from 2013. Skupski is a three-time Grand Slam quarterfinalist, having reached this stage at the 2017 Wimbledon Championships in both men's and mixed doubles, and the 2020 Australian Open in men's doubles.

At the 2010 Commonwealth Games in Delhi, he won two medals representing England, silver in men's doubles with Ross Hutchins, and bronze in mixed doubles partnering Sarah Borwell. Skupski also represented Great Britain in the Davis Cup on two occasions in 2010.

== Early and personal life ==
Ken Skupski was born in Liverpool. His father, Ken Sr. of Polish descent, is a retired police officer, his mother Mary is a golfer.

Skupski is a fan of Liverpool Football Club and is also a keen golfer.

== University tennis career ==
Skupski graduated from Louisiana State University in May 2007. NCAA Doubles finalist 2005 and Two-time Southeastern Conference Coaches Indoor Champion (only player in the history of the Southeastern Conference to win back-to-back titles). Fourth biggest winning player in the school's history with 107 wins. Six-time All-American (two Singles, one Doubles and three Academic).

== Professional career ==
=== 2004 ===
Eight years after he was crowned Wimbledon champion, Richard Krajicek took on Skupski in an exhibition match in Liverpool. Skupski tied a closely contested clash one set all, then won a Super TieBreak 10–7.

=== 2008 ===
Skupski was looking for a fellow British doubles partner who was capable of going to the top of the game. Colin Fleming had turned pro in September and Skupski thought Fleming's game style suited his. Skupski took a bit of a hit because his ranking 250 was much higher than Fleming's at around 900, and so they came to play some low-level Futures and went on a great run. The pair came to be known as 'Flemski'.

Fleming/Skupski won three Futures in Glasgow, London, Sunderland and the Caversham International Challenger in Jersey.

Ken Skupski finished the year there because he'd had a long year, but Fleming continued by partnering Jonny Marray in the Czech Republic and winning two Futures in Frydland Nad Ostravici, and Opava

=== 2009 ===
In June 2009, Skupski and Colin Fleming beat the world no. 1 ranked doubles pair, Mike Bryan and Bob Bryan, at the Queen's Club grass court tournament. However he was out in the first round at Wimbledon for the second year in a row in five sets having led by two sets to love, again he partnered Fleming. He did however make into the second round of the mixed doubles losing in straight sets.

In September, the Davis Cup Captain John Lloyd announced that Skupski was part of the Great Britain Davis Cup squad for the Europe/Africa Zone Group 1 relegation play-off against Poland, Skupsi was acting as cover for any injuries and helping the team prepare for Poland's world top-10 ranked doubles team, but didn't play. Great Britain lost 3–2, and were relegated to Group II of the Davis Cup.

In September 2009 he won at the Open de Moselle in France. Again partnering Fleming they won 2–6, 6–4, 10–5, against the defending champion, Arnaud Clément and Michaël Llodra. Two months later they won their second title at the St Petersburg Open, defeating another French team of Jérémy Chardy and Richard Gasquet in the final in three sets 2–6, 7–5, 10–4.

=== 2010 ===
In January 2010, Skupski competed at his first Grand Slam outside of Wimbledon at the Australian Open. Again partnering Fleming they made it into the second before losing in three sets to Michael Kohlmann and Jarkko Nieminen 6–3, 4–6, 3–6. At the French Open he repeated his feat at the Australian open by losing in at the second in three sets to fourth seeds Wesley Moodie and Dick Norman 6–7^{(5–7)}, 6–4, 6–7^{(4–7)}, again he partnered Fleming.

In June, Skupski reached the final of Eastbourne Open but lost in the final to Mariusz Fyrstenberg and Marcin Matkowski in three sets partnering Colin Fleming. Following his successful run at the Eastbourne Open he finally got a win at Wimbledon in the first round, but again lost in the second to the much more experienced and second seeds the Bryan brothers in straight sets, he was partnering Fleming. For the first time in his career he competed at all four Grand Slams in the same year, but at the US Open, Skupski and Fleming lost in the first round in straight sets.

The new Davis Cup Captain Leon Smith selected Skupski to take part in Great Britain's vital Davis Cup tie vs Turkey, at Eastbourne, in July alongside Colin Fleming, James Ward, Jamie Baker, and Alex Ward. Defeat would have meant Great Britain's relegation to Europe Zone Group III, the lowest tier of the competition. Skupski and Colin Fleming secured the 6–3, 6–4, 6–4 win that gave Britain an unassailable 3–0 lead, ending a run of five straight defeats, giving Great Britain a first Davis Cup win in three years.

In October, at the Commonwealth Games in Delhi, England's Skupski and Ross Hutchins won the Doubles Silver Medal, by losing to Australians Paul Hanley and Peter Luczak in the final. A few days later, Skupski and Ross Hutchins were opponents in the Mixed Doubles, Skupski and Sarah Borwell beating Ross Hutchins and Anna Smith to win the bronze medal. Skupski and Borwell who had never played together ahead of the Indian event were brought together by their shared coach, Louis Cayer.

Following the Commonwealth Games, Skupski and Colin Fleming decided to end their partnership after a poor run of results. Their final tournament was St. Petersburg where they were beaten in the first round.

=== 2011 ===
In January at the Australian Open Skupski this time partnering Travis Parrott lost in the first round in straight sets. In February, Skupski partnered Robin Haase at the Marseille Open. They reached the final and won the title defeating Julien Benneteau and Jo-Wilfried Tsonga 6–3, 6–7^{(4–7)}, [13–11]. This was his first title in a year and a half. At the French Open, Skupski again lost in the first round in straight sets to his old partner Fleming 4–6, 4–6, this time he was partnering Igor Zelenay. At Wimbledon again he lost in the first round in straight sets, he was partnering Robin Haase, In Mixed Doubles, he partnered Elena Baltacha where they got to the second round but lost in straight sets to fifteenth seeds Andy Ram and Meghann Shaughnessy 4–6, 4–6.

=== 2012 ===
At the Australian Open in January, Skupski partnered Xavier Malisse where they lost in the first round in straight sets. This was Skupski's fifth first round exit in a row without taking a single set. In mid June, Skupski reached the final of Aegon International partnering Jamie Delgado, but lost to fellow Brits Colin Fleming and Ross Hutchins 4–6, 3–6. This was his first final in over a year. At Wimbledon, Skupski reached the second round for the first time in two years after winning a grilling five setter in the first round. But Skupski and new doubles partner Jamie Delgado were unable to defeat the Bryan brothers and they lost in straight sets 6–7^{(2–7)}, 0–6, 2–6.

Skupski also competed in the mixed doubles event partnering Melanie South. They reached the third round but were defeated by third seeds Nenad Zimonjić and Katarina Srebotnik in three tough sets 4–6, 7–6^{(7–5)}, 7–9. A month after Wimbledon, Skupski and Delgado reached their second final of the season at the Farmers Classic. They lost in three sets to Belgium duo Ruben Bemelmans and Xavier Malisse 6–7^{(5–7)}, 6–4, [10–7]. At the US Open Skupski, with full-time partner Jamie Delgado made it to the third round before losing to Spanish sixth seeds Marcel Granollers and Marc López in straight sets 2–6, 4–6. In the second round they defeated the defending champions Jürgen Melzer and Philipp Petzschner in straight sets.

=== 2013 ===
Although initially partnering with Delgado, Skupski increasingly played during 2013 with his brother Neal. Due to Neal's lower ranking, the pair played in a number of Futures and Challenger tournaments, winning six tournaments at the Challenger level. At the Kremlin Cup they entered their first ATP level tournament, reaching the final. At Grand Slam events, Skupski competed with some of his former partners, reaching the second round once again at Wimbledon, with Xavier Malisse.

=== 2014 ===
The Skupski brothers ranking as a partnership was not high enough to guarantee entry at the French Open, so they split to give themselves a better chance of qualifying. Ken partnered New Zealander Michael Venus, a fellow Louisiana State University alumni, while Neal teamed up with American Bradley Klahn, though they all lost in the first round.

=== 2015 ===
In July, Neal Skupski was busy playing World Team tennis in the US, so Skupski partnered Divij Sharan, clinching the doubles title in the Euro 42,500 men's Challenger tennis tournament, with a 4–6, 7-6(3), 10–6 victory over fourth seeds Ilija Bozoljac of Serbia and Flavio Cipolla of Italy, in Recanati, Italy.

In September, the Skupskis won the St. Remy Challenger title in France, only playing two matches in the event due to opening round byes and a Semi-Final walkover. There were just 23 sets and three match breakers in the entire doubles event. They were the top seeds and beat the second seeds Andrej Martin and Igor Zelenay in the final, 6–4, 6–1.

=== 2017–2018: First Grand Slam doubles and mixed doubles quarterfinals, fourth ATP title ===
At the 2017 Wimbledon Championships he reached the quarterfinals as a wildcard for the first time in his career partnering with his brother Neal where they were defeated by 4th seeded pair Łukasz Kubot and Marcelo Melo. At the same tournament he also reached the mixed doubles quarterfinals partnering with Jocelyn Rae.

The Skupski brothers won their first ATP title together at the Open Sud de France.

=== 2020–2021: Second Grand Slam quarterfinal, First ATP 500 title ===
At the 2020 Australian Open, Skupski reached the quarterfinals partnering Santiago González for the first time at this Major and second overall.

In March 2021, Skupski won his sixth ATP title and first at the ATP 500 level with his brother Neal at the Mexican Open.

In June 2021, he also won the Nottingham Open on grass, this time partnering Matt Reid.

At the end of the year, he won his second ATP title of the season, the 2021 Sofia Open, partnering Jonny O'Mara.

=== 2022: Defending Nottingham Open title and retirement after Wimbledon ===
In June, at the beginning of the grass court season, partnering Jonny O'Mara, he defended his Nottingham Open title by beating Julian Cash and Henry Patten in the final after saving three championship points.

Skupski announced that Wimbledon 2022 was to be his last professional tournament. Partnering Jonny O'Mara again, he won the first round against Julio Peralta and Alejandro Tabilo. They won the second round against Marcelo Melo and Raven Klaasen. In the round of 16 they lost against 11th seeds from Germany Andreas Mies and Kevin Krawietz, which was the last match of his career. He was also scheduled to play Wimbledon mixed doubles with Heather Watson, but she pulled off before their first round match with a knee injury.

== World TeamTennis ==
Skupski has played two seasons with World TeamTennis starting in 2017 when he debuted in the league with the Orange County Breakers and was named WTT's Male Rookie of the Year. In 2019 he joined the expansion Orlando Storm for their inaugural season. It was announced that he will rejoining the Orlando Storm during the 2020 season set to begin 12 July, his second time with the team having also played in the previous season.

Skupski paired up with Tennys Sandgren in men's doubles during the season as well as Jessica Pegula in mixed doubles. Skupski earned a season high 56% of games won in men's doubles to help the Storm claim a No. 3 seed in the WTT Playoffs. The Storm would ultimately fall to the Chicago Smash in the semifinals.

== ATP career finals ==
=== Doubles: 17 (7 titles, 10 runners-up) ===
Legend Grand Slam tournaments (0–0) ATP World Tour Finals (0–0) ATP World Tour Masters 1000 (0–0) ATP World Tour 500 Series (1–0) ATP World Tour 250 Series (6–10)	Finals by surface Hard (6–5) Clay (1–2) Grass (0–3)	Finals by setting Outdoor (2–8) Indoor (5–2)

Result	W–L	Date	Tournament	Tier	Surface	Partner	Opponents	Score
Win	1–0	Sep 2009	Open de Moselle, France	250 Series	Hard (i)	(United Kingdom) Colin Fleming	(France) Arnaud Clément (France) Michaël Llodra	2–6, 6–4, [10–5]
Win	2–0	Nov 2009	St. Petersburg Open, Russia	250 Series	Hard (i)	(United Kingdom) Colin Fleming	(France) Jérémy Chardy (France) Richard Gasquet	2–6, 7–5, [10–4]
Loss	2–1	Jun 2010	Eastbourne International, United Kingdom	250 Series	Grass	(United Kingdom) Colin Fleming	(Poland) Mariusz Fyrstenberg (Poland) Marcin Matkowski	3–6, 7–5, [8–10]
Win	3–1	Feb 2011	Open 13, France	250 Series	Hard (i)	(Netherlands) Robin Haase	(France) Julien Benneteau (France) Jo-Wilfried Tsonga	6–4, 6–7^{(4–7)}, [13–11]
Loss	3–2	Jun 2012	Eastbourne International, United Kingdom	250 Series	Grass	(United Kingdom) Jamie Delgado	(United Kingdom) Colin Fleming (United Kingdom) Ross Hutchins	4–6, 3–6
Loss	3–3	Jul 2012	Los Angeles Open, United States	250 Series	Hard	(United Kingdom) Jamie Delgado	(Belgium) Ruben Bemelmans (Belgium) Xavier Malisse	6–7^{(5–7)}, 6–4, [7–10]
Loss	3–4	Oct 2013	Kremlin Cup, Russia	250 Series	Hard (i)	(United Kingdom) Neal Skupski	(Russia) Mikhail Elgin (Uzbekistan) Denis Istomin	2–6, 6–1, [12–14]
Loss	3–5	Aug 2016	Los Cabos Open, Mexico	250 Series	Hard	(Israel) Jonathan Erlich	(India) Purav Raja (India) Divij Sharan	6–7^{(4–7)}, 6–7^{(3–7)}
Win	4–5	Feb 2018	Open Sud de France, France	250 Series	Hard (i)	(United Kingdom) Neal Skupski	(Japan) Ben McLachlan (France) Hugo Nys	7–6^{(7–2)}, 6–4
Loss	4–6	Jun 2018	Eastbourne International, United Kingdom	250 Series	Grass	(United Kingdom) Neal Skupski	(United Kingdom) Luke Bambridge (United Kingdom) Jonny O'Mara	5–7, 4–6
Loss	4–7	Sep 2018	Moselle Open, France	250 Series	Hard (i)	(United Kingdom) Neal Skupski	(France) Nicolas Mahut (France) Édouard Roger-Vasselin	1–6, 5–7
Loss	4–8	Feb 2019	Delray Beach Open, United States	250 Series	Hard	(United Kingdom) Neal Skupski	(United States) Bob Bryan (United States) Mike Bryan	6–7^{(5–7)}, 4–6
Loss	4–9	Apr 2019	US Clay Court Championships, United States	250 Series	Clay	(United Kingdom) Neal Skupski	(Mexico) Santiago González (Pakistan) Aisam-ul-Haq Qureshi	6–3, 4–6, [6–10]
Win	5–9	Apr 2019	Hungarian Open, Hungary	250 Series	Clay	(United Kingdom) Neal Skupski	(New Zealand) Marcus Daniell (Netherlands) Wesley Koolhof	6–3, 6–4
Loss	5–10	May 2019	Lyon Open, France	250 Series	Clay	(United Kingdom) Neal Skupski	(Croatia) Ivan Dodig (France) Édouard Roger-Vasselin	4–6, 3–6
Win	6–10	Mar 2021	Mexican Open, Mexico	500 Series	Hard	(United Kingdom) Neal Skupski	(Spain) Marcel Granollers (Argentina) Horacio Zeballos	7–6^{(7–3)}, 6–4
Win	7–10	Oct 2021	Sofia Open, Bulgaria	250 Series	Hard (i)	(United Kingdom) Jonny O'Mara	(Austria) Oliver Marach (Austria) Philipp Oswald	6–3, 6–4

== ATP Challengers and ITF Futures finals ==
=== Singles: 2 (1–1) ===
Legend ATP Challengers (0–0) ITF Futures (1–1)	Finals by surface Hard (0–1) Clay (0–0) Grass (0–0) Carpet (1–0)

Result	W–L	Date	Tournament	Tier	Surface	Opponent	Score
Loss	0–1	Nov 2007	Great Britain F22, Sunderland	Futures	Hard (i)	(France) Adrian Mannarino	4–6, 3–6
Win	1–1	May 2008	Greece F2, Heraklion	Futures	Carpet	(Spain) David Canudas-Fernandez	6–3, 6–3

=== Doubles: 77 (48–29) ===
Legend ATP Challengers (33–24) ITF Futures (15–5)	Finals by surface Hard (36–19) Clay (5–0) Grass (5–7) Carpet (2–3)

Result	W–L	Date	Tournament	Tier	Surface	Partner	Opponents	Score
Win	1–0	Aug 2004	Great Britain F3, Wrexham	Futures	Hard	(United Kingdom) Richard Bloomfield	(United Kingdom) Josh Goodall (United Kingdom) Miles Kasiri	6–2, 6–4
Loss	1–1	Aug 2004	Great Britain F4, Hampstead	Futures	Hard	(United Kingdom) Richard Bloomfield	(United Kingdom) Richard Barker (United Kingdom) William Barker	3–6, 1–6
Win	2–1	Sep 2007	Great Britain F16, Foxhills	Futures	Hard	(United Kingdom) Robert Searle	(Japan) Yaoki Ishii (Japan) Satoshi Iwabuchi	4–6, 6–3, 6–4
Win	3–1	Sep 2007	Sweden F5, Falun	Futures	Hard (i)	(Germany) Ralph Grambow	(Australia) Raphael Durek (Sweden) Pablo Figueroa	6–4, 6–2
Win	4–1	Oct 2007	Great Britain F20, Glasgow	Futures	Hard (i)	(United Kingdom) Josh Goodall	(Czech Republic) Ladislav Chramosta (United Kingdom) Dan Evans	7–6^{(7–5)}, 7–6^{(9–7)}
Win	5–1	Nov 2007	Great Britain F21, Redbridge	Futures	Hard (i)	(United Kingdom) Josh Goodall	(Belgium) Ruben Bemelmans (Belgium) Niels Desein	5–7, 7–6^{(7–3)}, [10–5]
Win	6–1	Jan 2008	Great Britain F1, Sunderland	Futures	Hard (i)	(United Kingdom) Richard Bloomfield	(Germany) Ralph Grambow (United Kingdom) Tom Rushby	6–1, 6–4
Loss	6–2	Jan 2008	Great Britain F2, Sheffield	Futures	Hard (i)	(United Kingdom) Chris Eaton	(Czech Republic) Jiří Krkoška (India) Purav Raja	6–7^{(7–9)}, 6–7^{(4–7)}
Loss	6–3	Mar 2008	Wolfsburg, Germany	Challenger	Carpet (i)	(United Kingdom) Richard Bloomfield	(Australia) Carsten Ball (South Africa) Izak van der Merwe	6–7^{(5–7)}, 3–6
Loss	6–4	Mar 2008	Great Britain F4, Bath	Futures	Hard (i)	(United Kingdom) Richard Bloomfield	(United Kingdom) Neil Bamford (United Kingdom) Josh Goodall	1–6, 6–3, [8–10]
Win	7–4	Mar 2008	Great Britain F5, Saint Peter	Futures	Hard (i)	(Germany) Ralph Grambow	(United Kingdom) Neil Bamford (United Kingdom) Josh Goodall	7–6^{(9–7)}, 6–3
Loss	7–5	Apr 2008	Great Britain F6, Exmouth	Futures	Hard (i)	(Germany) Ralph Grambow	(Finland) Harri Heliövaara (Finland) Henri Kontinen	2–6, 2–6
Win	8–5	May 2008	Great Britain F7, Bournemouth	Futures	Clay	(France) Ludovic Walter	(United Kingdom) Edward Seator (United Kingdom) Daniel Smethurst	7–6^{(7–2)}, 2–6, [10–6]
Loss	8–6	May 2008	Kuwait F1, Mishref	Futures	Hard	(India) Rohan Gajjar	(Kuwait) Mohammad Ghareeb (Sweden) Johan Örtegren	4–6, 6–3, [7–10]
Win	9–6	Oct 2008	Great Britain F16, Glasgow	Futures	Hard (i)	(United Kingdom) Colin Fleming	(Croatia) Ivan Cerović (Montenegro) Daniel Danilovic	6–4, 6–4
Win	10–6	Nov 2008	Great Britain F17, Campden Hill	Futures	Hard (i)	(United Kingdom) Colin Fleming	(Croatia) Ivan Cerović (Montenegro) Daniel Danilovic	6–4, 7–6^{(9–7)}
Win	11–6	Nov 2008	Great Britain F18, Sunderland	Futures	Hard (i)	(United Kingdom) Colin Fleming	(Croatia) Ivan Cerović (Montenegro) Daniel Danilovic	6–2, 6–1
Win	12–6	Nov 2008	Jersey, Channel Islands	Challenger	Hard (i)	(United Kingdom) Colin Fleming	(Australia) Chris Guccione (Brazil) Márcio Torres	6–3, 6–2
Win	13–6	Feb 2009	Ivory Coast F2, Abidjan	Futures	Hard	(United Kingdom) Colin Fleming	(Canada) Pierre-Ludovic Duclos (Austria) Andreas Haider-Maurer	6–3, 7–6^{(7–3)}
Win	14–6	Feb 2009	Wolfsburg, Germany	Challenger	Carpet (i)	(United States) Travis Rettenmaier	(Ukraine) Sergei Bubka (Russia) Alexander Kudryavtsev	6–3, 6–4
Win	15–6	Mar 2009	Great Britain F4, Bath	Futures	Hard (i)	(United Kingdom) Colin Fleming	(South Africa) Fritz Wolmarans (United States) Michael Yani	6–4, 6–4
Loss	15–7	Mar 2009	Jersey, Channel Islands	Challenger	Hard (i)	(United Kingdom) Colin Fleming	(United States) Eric Butorac (United States) Travis Rettenmaier	4–6, 3–6
Loss	15–8	Apr 2009	Tallahassee, United States	Challenger	Hard	(United Kingdom) Colin Fleming	(United States) Eric Butorac (United States) Scott Lipsky	1–6, 4–6
Win	16–8	May 2009	Cremona, Italy	Challenger	Hard	(United Kingdom) Colin Fleming	(Italy) Daniele Bracciali (Italy) Alessandro Motti	6–2, 6–1
Loss	16–9	Jun 2009	Nottingham, United Kingdom	Challenger	Grass	(United Kingdom) Colin Fleming	(United States) Eric Butorac (United States) Scott Lipsky	4–6, 4–6
Loss	16–10	Jul 2009	Pozoblanco, Spain	Challenger	Hard	(United Kingdom) Colin Fleming	(Slovakia) Karol Beck (Czech Republic) Jaroslav Levinský	6–2, 6–7^{(5–7)}, [7–10]
Loss	16–11	Jul 2009	Manchester, United Kingdom	Challenger	Grass	(United Kingdom) Colin Fleming	(United Kingdom) Josh Goodall (United Kingdom) Jonathan Marray	7–6^{(7–1)}, 3–6, [9–11]
Win	17–11	Aug 2009	Granby, Canada	Challenger	Hard	(United Kingdom) Colin Fleming	(Israel) Amir Hadad (Israel) Harel Levy	6–3, 7–6^{(8–6)}
Win	18–11	Oct 2009	Orléans, France	Challenger	Hard (i)	(United Kingdom) Colin Fleming	(France) Sébastien Grosjean (France) Olivier Patience	6–1, 6–1
Win	19–11	Mar 2010	Jersey, Channel Islands (2)	Challenger	Hard (i)	(India) Rohan Bopanna	(United Kingdom) Jonathan Marray (United Kingdom) Jamie Murray	6–2, 2–6, [10–6]
Win	20–11	Jun 2010	Nottingham, United Kingdom	Challenger	Grass	(United Kingdom) Colin Fleming	(United States) Eric Butorac (United States) Scott Lipsky	7–6^{(7–3)}, 6–4
Loss	20–12	Nov 2010	Loughborough, United Kingdom	Challenger	Hard (i)	(Australia) Jordan Kerr	(Finland) Henri Kontinen (Denmark) Frederik Nielsen	2–6, 4–6
Win	21–12	Feb 2011	Bergamo, Italy	Challenger	Hard (i)	(Denmark) Frederik Nielsen	(Russia) Mikhail Elgin (Russia) Alexander Kudryavtsev	Walkover
Win	22–12	Jul 2011	Recanati, Italy	Challenger	Hard (i)	(Denmark) Frederik Nielsen	(Italy) Federico Gaio (India) Purav Raja	6–4, 7–5
Win	23–12	Oct 2011	Mons, Belgium	Challenger	Hard (i)	(Sweden) Johan Brunström	(France) Kenny de Schepper (France) Édouard Roger-Vasselin	7–6^{(7–4)}, 6–3
Win	24–12	Feb 2012	Bergamo, Italy (2)	Challenger	Hard (i)	(United Kingdom) Jamie Delgado	(Austria) Martin Fischer (Austria) Philipp Oswald	7–5, 7–5
Loss	24–13	Mar 2012	Bath, United Kingdom	Challenger	Hard (i)	(United Kingdom) Jamie Delgado	(Austria) Martin Fischer (Austria) Philipp Oswald	4–6, 4–6
Win	25–13	May 2012	Rome, Italy	Challenger	Clay	(United Kingdom) Jamie Delgado	(Spain) Adrián Menéndez Maceiras (Italy) Walter Trusendi	6–1, 6–4
Loss	25–14	Sep 2012	Orléans, France	Challenger	Hard (i)	(Belgium) Xavier Malisse	(Czech Republic) Lukáš Dlouhý (Luxembourg) Gilles Müller	2–6, 7–6^{(7–5)}, [7–10]
Win	26–14	Jan 2013	Great Britain F2, Portsmouth	Futures	Hard (i)	(United Kingdom) Neal Skupski	(Republic of Ireland) Sam Barry (Republic of Ireland) Colin O'Brien	3–6, 6–3, [10–5]
Loss	26–15	Feb 2013	Quimper, France	Challenger	Hard (i)	(United Kingdom) Jamie Delgado	(Sweden) Johan Brunström (South Africa) Raven Klaasen	6–3, 2–6, [3–10]
Win	27–15	May 2013	Italy F6, Pozzuoli	Futures	Clay	(United Kingdom) Neal Skupski	(United Kingdom) Oliver Golding (Ukraine) Denys Mylokostov	6–3, 6–3
Loss	27–16	Jun 2013	Nottingham, United Kingdom	Challenger	Grass	(United Kingdom) Neal Skupski	(United Kingdom) Jamie Murray (Australia) John Peers	2–6, 7–6^{(7–3)}, [6–10]
Win	28–16	Jul 2013	Recanati, Italy (2)	Challenger	Hard	(United Kingdom) Neal Skupski	(Italy) Gianluigi Quinzi (Italy) Adelchi Virgili	6–4, 6–3
Win	29–16	Aug 2013	Segovia, Spain	Challenger	Hard	(United Kingdom) Neal Skupski	(Russia) Mikhail Elgin (Belarus) Uladzimir Ignatik	6–3, 6–7^{(4–7)}, [10–6]
Win	30–16	Sep 2013	Pétange, Luxembourg	Challenger	Hard (i)	(United Kingdom) Neal Skupski	(Germany) Benjamin Becker (Germany) Tobias Kamke	6–3, 6–7^{(5–7)}, [10–7]
Win	31–16	Sep 2013	Szczecin, Poland	Challenger	Clay	(United Kingdom) Neal Skupski	(Italy) Andrea Arnaboldi (Italy) Alessandro Giannessi	6–4, 1–6, [10–7]
Loss	31–17	Jan 2014	Talheim, Germany	Challenger	Hard (i)	(United Kingdom) Neal Skupski	(Poland) Tomasz Bednarek (Finland) Henri Kontinen	6–3, 6–7^{(3–7)}, [10–12]
Win	32–17	Sep 2014	İzmir, Turkey	Challenger	Hard	(United Kingdom) Neal Skupski	(Tunisia) Malek Jaziri (Russia) Alexander Kudryavtsev	6–1, 6–4
Win	33–17	Nov 2014	Bratislava, Slovakia	Challenger	Hard (i)	(United Kingdom) Neal Skupski	(Slovakia) Norbert Gombos (Czech Republic) Adam Pavlásek	6–3, 7–6^{(7–3)}
Win	34–17	Jun 2015	Surbiton, United Kingdom	Challenger	Grass	(United Kingdom) Neal Skupski	(New Zealand) Marcus Daniell (Brazil) Marcelo Demoliner	6–3, 6–4
Loss	34–18	Jun 2015	Ilkley, United Kingdom	Challenger	Grass	(United Kingdom) Neal Skupski	(New Zealand) Marcus Daniell (Brazil) Marcelo Demoliner	6–7^{(3–7)}, 4–6
Win	35–18	Jul 2015	Recanati, Italy (3)	Challenger	Hard	(India) Divij Sharan	(Serbia) Ilija Bozoljac (Italy) Flavio Cipolla	4–6, 7–6^{(7–3)}, [10–6]
Win	36–18	Sep 2015	Saint-Rémy, France	Challenger	Hard	(United Kingdom) Neal Skupski	(Slovakia) Andrej Martin (Slovakia) Igor Zelenay	6–4, 6–1
Loss	36–19	Oct 2015	Orléans, France	Challenger	Hard (i)	(United Kingdom) Neal Skupski	(France) Tristan Lamasine (France) Fabrice Martin	4–6, 6–7^{(2–7)}
Loss	36–20	Oct 2015	Brest, France	Challenger	Hard (i)	(United Kingdom) Neal Skupski	(Netherlands) Wesley Koolhof (Netherlands) Matwé Middelkoop	6–3, 4–6, [6–10]
Loss	36–21	Nov 2015	Eckental, Germany	Challenger	Carpet (i)	(United Kingdom) Neal Skupski	(Belgium) Ruben Bemelmans (Germany) Philipp Petzschner	5–7, 2–6
Loss	36–22	Nov 2015	Bratislava, Slovakia	Challenger	Hard (i)	(United Kingdom) Neal Skupski	(Serbia) Ilija Bozoljac (Slovakia) Igor Zelenay	6–7^{(3–7)}, 6–4, [5–10]
Win	37–22	Feb 2016	Bergamo, Italy (3)	Challenger	Hard (i)	(United Kingdom) Neal Skupski	(Croatia) Nikola Mektić (Croatia) Antonio Šančić	6–3, 7–5
Win	38–22	Feb 2016	Cherbourg, France	Challenger	Hard (i)	(United Kingdom) Neal Skupski	(Japan) Yoshihito Nishioka (Bosnia and Herzegovina) Aldin Šetkić	4–6, 6–3, [10–6]
Loss	38–23	Jun 2016	Manchester, United Kingdom	Challenger	Grass	(United Kingdom) Neal Skupski	(India) Purav Raja (India) Divij Sharan	3–6, 6–3, [9–11]
Loss	38–24	Jun 2016	Surbiton, United Kingdom	Challenger	Grass	(United Kingdom) Neal Skupski	(India) Purav Raja (India) Divij Sharan	4–6, 6–7^{(3–7)}
Win	39–24	Sep 2016	Saint-Rémy, France (2)	Challenger	Hard	(United Kingdom) Neal Skupski	(Republic of Ireland) David O'Hare (United Kingdom) Joe Salisbury	6–7^{(5–7)}, 6–4, [10–5]
Win	40–24	Nov 2016	Bratislava, Slovakia (2)	Challenger	Hard (i)	(United Kingdom) Neal Skupski	(India) Purav Raja (India) Divij Sharan	4–6, 6–3, [10–5]
Loss	40–25	Feb 2017	Quimper, France	Challenger	Hard (i)	(United Kingdom) Neal Skupski	(Russia) Mikhail Elgin (Slovakia) Igor Zelenay	6–2, 5–7, [5–10]
Win	41–25	May 2017	Venice, Italy	Challenger	Clay	(United Kingdom) Neal Skupski	(Austria) Julian Knowle (Slovakia) Igor Zelenay	5–7, 6–4, [10–5]
Win	42–25	Jun 2017	Nottingham, United Kingdom	Challenger	Grass	(United Kingdom) Neal Skupski	(Australia) Matt Reid (Australia) John-Patrick Smith	7–6^{(7–1)}, 2–6, [10–7]
Loss	42–26	Nov 2017	Eckental, Germany	Challenger	Carpet (i)	(United Kingdom) Neal Skupski	(Netherlands) Sander Arends (Czech Republic) Roman Jebavý	2–6, 4–6
Win	43–26	Nov 2017	Bratislava, Slovakia (3)	Challenger	Hard (i)	(United Kingdom) Neal Skupski	(Netherlands) Sander Arends (Croatia) Antonio Šančić	5–7, 6–3, [10–8]
Win	44–26	Feb 2018	Quimper, France	Challenger	Hard (i)	(United Kingdom) Neal Skupski	(Belgium) Sander Gillé (Belgium) Joran Vliegen	6–3, 3–6, [10–7]
Loss	44–27	Feb 2018	Cherbourg, France	Challenger	Hard (i)	(Croatia) Antonio Šančić	(Monaco) Romain Arneodo (Austria) Tristan-Samuel Weissborn	3–6, 6–1, [4–10]
Loss	44–28	Jun 2018	Surbiton, United Kingdom	Challenger	Grass	(United Kingdom) Neal Skupski	(United Kingdom) Luke Bambridge (United Kingdom) Jonny O'Mara	6–7^{(11–13)}, 6–4, [7–10]
Win	45–28	Oct 2019	Mouilleron-le-Captif, France	Challenger	Hard (i)	(United Kingdom) Jonny O'Mara	(Netherlands) Sander Arends (Netherlands) David Pel	6–1, 6–4
Loss	45–29	Oct 2019	Hamburg, Germany	Challenger	Hard (i)	(Australia) John-Patrick Smith	(United States) James Cerretani (United States) Maxime Cressy	4–6, 4–6
Win	46–29	Nov 2019	Eckental, Germany	Challenger	Carpet (i)	(Australia) John-Patrick Smith	(Netherlands) Sander Arends (Czech Republic) Roman Jebavý	7–6^{(7–2)}, 6–4
Win	47–29	Jun 2021	Nottingham, UK (2)	Challenger	Grass	(Australia) Matt Reid	(Australia) Matthew Ebden (Australia) John-Patrick Smith	4–6, 7–5, [10–6]
Win	48–29	Jun 2022	Nottingham, UK (3)	Challenger	Grass	(United Kingdom) Jonny O'Mara	(United Kingdom) Julian Cash (United Kingdom) Henry Patten	3–6, 6–2, [16–14]

== Doubles performance timeline ==
Key
W	F	SF	QF	#R	RR	Q#	P#	DNQ	A	Z#	PO	G	S	B	NMS	NTI	P	NH

(W) winner; (F) finalist; (SF) semifinalist; (QF) quarterfinalist; (#R) rounds 4, 3, 2, 1; (RR) round-robin stage; (Q#) qualification round; (P#) preliminary round; (DNQ) did not qualify; (A) absent; (Z#) Davis/Fed Cup Zonal Group (with number indication) or (PO) play-off; (G) gold, (S) silver or (B) bronze Olympic/Paralympic medal; (NMS) not a Masters tournament; (NTI) not a Tier I tournament; (P) postponed; (NH) not held; (SR) strike rate (events won / competed); (W–L) win–loss record.
To avoid confusion and double counting, these charts are updated at the conclusion of a tournament or when the player's participation has ended.

Tournament	2007	2008	2009	2010	2011	2012	2013	2014	2015	2016	2017	2018	2019	2020	2021	2022	SR	W–L
Grand Slam tournaments
Australian Open	A	A	A	2R	1R	1R	1R	A	A	A	1R	1R	2R	QF	2R	2R	0 / 10	7–10
French Open	A	A	A	2R	1R	A	1R	1R	A	1R	A	2R	2R	1R	1R	A	0 / 9	3–9
Wimbledon	A	1R	1R	2R	1R	2R	2R	1R	1R	2R	QF	3R	2R	NH	2R	3R	0 / 14	13–14
US Open	A	A	A	1R	A	3R	1R	A	A	A	2R	1R	1R	1R	1R	A	0 / 8	3–8
Win–loss	0–0	0–1	0–1	3–4	0–3	3–3	1–4	0–2	0–1	1–2	4–3	3–4	3–4	3–3	2–4	3–2	0 / 41	26–41
National representation
Davis Cup	A	A	A	Z2	A	A	A	A	A	A	A	A	A	A	A	A	0 / 0	2–0
Career statistics
Tournaments	0	1	5	20	10	15	14	12	4	11	8	14	16	11	18	9	167	
Titles	0	0	2	0	1	0	0	0	0	0	0	1	1	0	2	0	7	
Finals	0	0	2	1	1	2	1	0	0	1	0	3	4	0	2	0	17	
Overall win–loss	0–0	0–1	11–3	15–20	7–9	16–15	7–14	5–12	2–4	7–11	6–8	20–13	21–16	7–11	14–16	3–9	141–162	
Year-end ranking	453	241	54	77	90	52	77	90	100	77	87	55	53	56	56	—	49%	
