= Slovak Open =

- 2026 Slovak Open

Tournament information
- Event name: J&T Banka Slovak Open (2026-), Peugeot Slovak Open (2020-2023)
- Location: Bratislava, Slovakia
- Venue: Peugeot aréna, NTC
- Surface: Hard (indoor)
- Website: tennisslovakopen.sk
ATP Tour
- Category: ATP Challenger 100 (2026-), ATP 125 (2023-2025)
- Draw: 32S / 32Q / 16D
- Prize money: €181,250 (2025), €148,625
WTA Tour
- Category: ITF Women's Circuit
- Draw: 32S / 32Q / 16D
- Prize money: $60,000

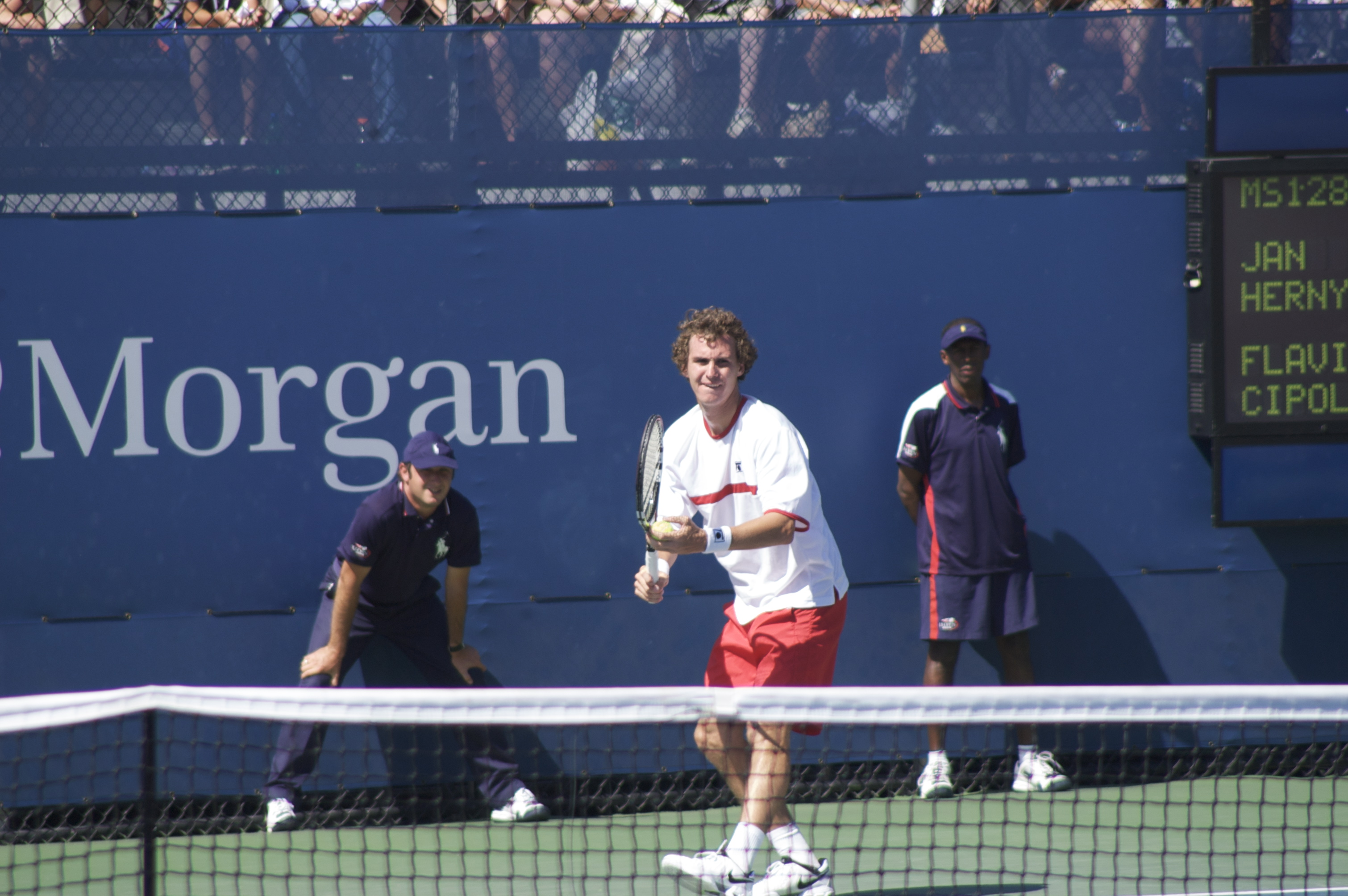
Czech Jan Hernych defeated Stéphane Bohli to win the 2008 singles

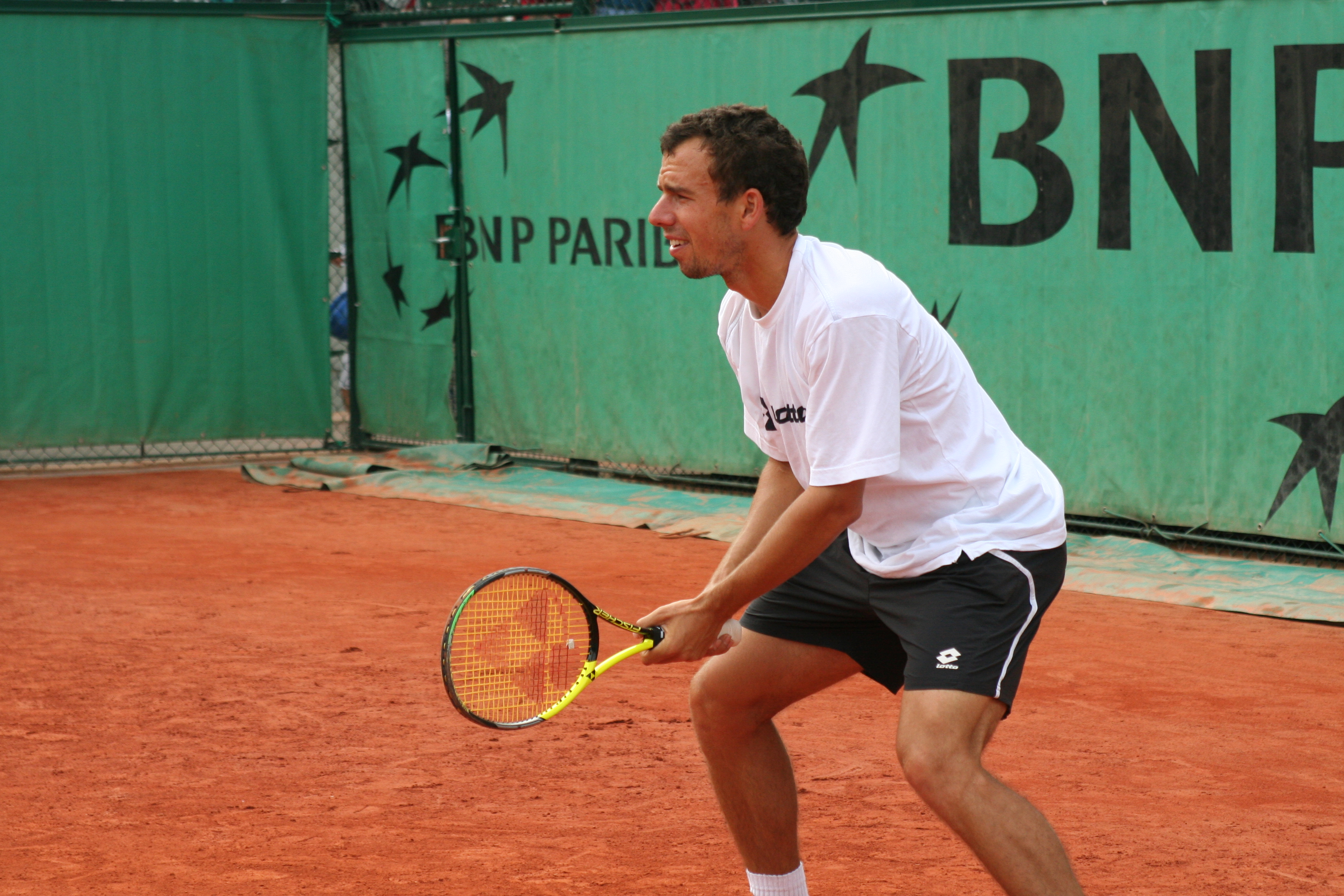
Bratislava-born Dominik Hrbatý reached both singles and doubles finals in 2005, losing the doubles, but winning in singles over Daniele Bracciali

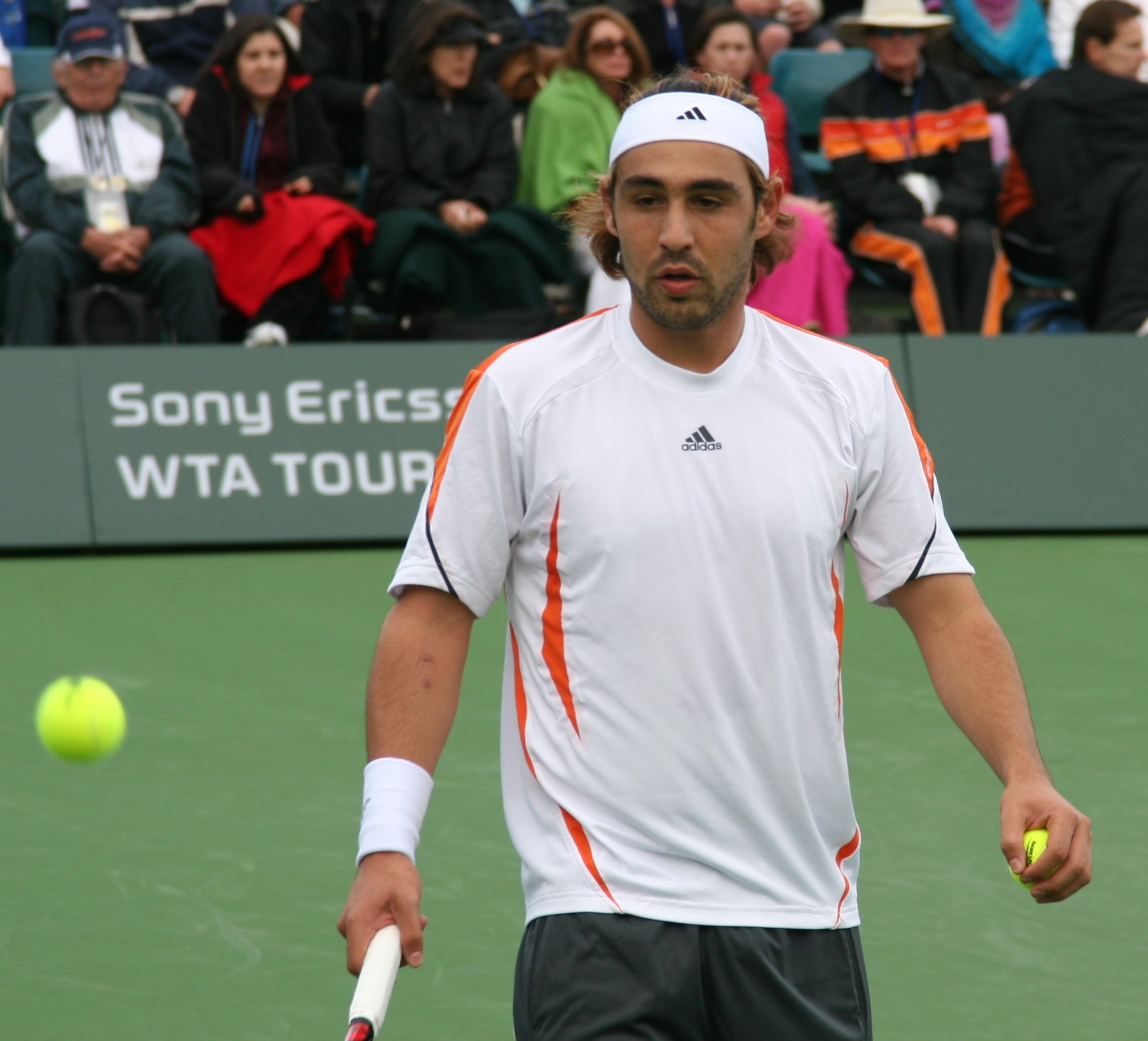
Eventual top tenner Marcos Baghdatis from Cyprus took the 2004 singles title

The J&T Banka Slovak Open is a professional tennis tournament played on indoor hardcourts. It is an ATP Challenger Tour and an ITF Women's Circuit event. It is held at the Peugeot Aréna, Národné Tenisové Centrum (NTC) in Bratislava, Slovakia, since 2000. It was part of the Tretorn SERIE+ on the Challenger Tour. It was part of the ATP 125 events in 2023-2025.

== Past finals ==
=== Men's singles ===
Year	Champion	Runner-up	Score
2026	(Austria) Jurij Rodionov	(Switzerland) Jérôme Kym	6–2, 6–1
2025	(Belgium) Alexander Blockx	(France) Titouan Droguet	6–4, 6–3
2024	Roman Safiullin	(Belgium) Raphaël Collignon	6–3, 6–4
2023	(Canada) Gabriel Diallo	(Belgium) Joris De Loore	6–0, 7–5
2022	(Hungary) Márton Fucsovics	(Hungary) Fábián Marozsán	6–2, 6–4
2021	(Netherlands) Tallon Griekspoor	(Hungary) Zsombor Piros	6–3, 6–2
2020	(Germany) Maximilian Marterer	(Czech Republic) Tomáš Macháč	6–7^{(3–7)}, 6–2, 7–5
2019	(Austria) Dennis Novak	(Bosnia and Herzegovina) Damir Džumhur	6–1, 6–1
2018	(Kazakhstan) Alexander Bublik	(Czech Republic) Lukáš Rosol	6–4, 6–4
2017	(Slovakia) Lukáš Lacko	(Romania) Marius Copil	6–4, 7–6^{(7–4)}
2016	(Slovakia) Norbert Gombos	(Romania) Marius Copil	7–6^{(10–8)}, 4–6, 6–3
2015	(Belarus) Egor Gerasimov	(Slovakia) Lukáš Lacko	7–6^{(7–1)}, 7–6^{(7–5)}
2014	(Germany) Peter Gojowczyk	(Uzbekistan) Farrukh Dustov	7–6^{(7–2)}, 6–3
2013	(Slovakia) Lukáš Lacko	(Czech Republic) Lukáš Rosol	6–4, 4–6, 6–4
2012	(Czech Republic) Lukáš Rosol	(Germany) Björn Phau	6–7^{(3–7)}, 7–6^{(7–5)}, 7–5^{(8–6)}
2011	(Slovakia) Lukáš Lacko	(Lithuania) Ričardas Berankis	7–6^{(9–7)}, 6–2
2010	(Slovakia) Martin Kližan	(Austria) Stefan Koubek	7–6^{(7–4)}, 6–2
2009	(Germany) Michael Berrer	(Slovakia) Dominik Hrbatý	6–7^{(6–8)}, 6–4, 7–6^{(7–3)}
2008	(Czech Republic) Jan Hernych	(Switzerland) Stéphane Bohli	6–2, 6–4
2007	(Italy) Simone Bolelli	(Colombia) Alejandro Falla	4–6, 7–6^{(9–7)}, 6–1
2006	(Slovakia) Michal Mertiňák	(Czech Republic) Lukáš Dlouhý	7–6^{(7–4)}, 6–4
2005	(Slovakia) Dominik Hrbatý	(Italy) Daniele Bracciali	7–5, 6–1
2004	(Cyprus) Marcos Baghdatis	(Slovakia) Dominik Hrbatý	7–6^{(7–4)}, 7–6^{(7–3)}
2003	(Switzerland) Marc Rosset	(Netherlands) John van Lottum	3–6, 6–3, 6–0
2002	(France) Antony Dupuis	(Slovakia) Karol Beck	4–6, 6–4, 7–6^{(7–1)}
2001	(Slovakia) Karol Kučera	(Armenia) Sargis Sargsian	6–1, 7–5
2000	(Italy) Davide Sanguinetti	(Germany) Rainer Schüttler	7–5, 6–1

=== Men's doubles ===
Year	Champions	Runners-up	Score
2026	(Slovakia) Miloš Karol (Czech Republic) Andrew Paulson	(Netherlands) Jean-Julien Rojer (United States) Theodore Winegar	7–6^{(7–3)}, 6–3
2025	(Belgium) Sander Gillé (Netherlands) Sem Verbeek	(United Kingdom) Joshua Paris (United Kingdom) Marcus Willis	7–6^{(7–3)}, 6–3
2024	(Colombia) Nicolás Barrientos (United Kingdom) Julian Cash	(Sweden) André Göransson (Netherlands) Sem Verbeek	6–3, 6–4
2023	(India) Sriram Balaji (Germany) Andre Begemann	(Kazakhstan) Andrey Golubev (Ukraine) Denys Molchanov	6–3, 5–7, [10–8]
2022	(Ukraine) Denys Molchanov (Kazakhstan) Aleksandr Nedovyesov	(Czech Republic) Petr Nouza (Czech Republic) Andrew Paulson	4–6, 6–4, [10–6]
2021	(Slovakia) Filip Horanský (Ukraine) Sergiy Stakhovsky	(Ukraine) Denys Molchanov (Kazakhstan) Aleksandr Nedovyesov	6–4, 6–4
2020	(Finland) Harri Heliövaara (Finland) Emil Ruusuvuori	(Slovakia) Lukáš Klein (Slovakia) Alex Molčan	6–4, 6–3
2019	(Denmark) Frederik Nielsen (Germany) Tim Pütz	(Czech Republic) Roman Jebavý (Slovakia) Igor Zelenay	4–6, 7–6^{(7–4)}, [11–9]
2018	(Ukraine) Denys Molchanov (Slovakia) Igor Zelenay	(India) Ramkumar Ramanathan (Belarus) Andrei Vasilevski	6–2, 3–6, [11–9]
2017	(United Kingdom) Ken Skupski (United Kingdom) Neal Skupski	(Netherlands) Sander Arends (Croatia) Antonio Šančić	5–7, 6–3, [10–8]
2016	(United Kingdom) Ken Skupski (United Kingdom) Neal Skupski	(India) Purav Raja (India) Divij Sharan	4–6, 6–3, [10–5]
2015	(Serbia) Ilija Bozoljac (Slovakia) Igor Zelenay	(United Kingdom) Ken Skupski (United Kingdom) Neal Skupski	7–6^{(7–3)}, 4–6, [10–5]
2014	(United Kingdom) Ken Skupski (United Kingdom) Neal Skupski	(Slovakia) Norbert Gombos (Czech Republic) Adam Pavlásek	6–3, 7–6^{(7–3)}
2013	(Finland) Henri Kontinen (Sweden) Andreas Siljeström	(Germany) Gero Kretschmer (Germany) Jan-Lennard Struff	7–6^{(8–6)}, 6–2
2012	(Czech Republic) Lukáš Dlouhý (Russia) Michail Elgin	(Germany) Philipp Marx (Romania) Florin Mergea	6–7^{(5–7)}, 6–2, [10–6]
2011	(Czech Republic) Jan Hájek (Slovakia) Lukáš Lacko	(Czech Republic) Lukáš Rosol (Czech Republic) David Škoch	7–5, 7–5
2010	(United Kingdom) Colin Fleming (United Kingdom) Jamie Murray	(United States) Travis Parrott (Slovakia) Filip Polášek	6–2, 3–6, [10–6]
2009	(Germany) Philipp Marx (Slovakia) Igor Zelenay	(Czech Republic) Leoš Friedl (Czech Republic) David Škoch	6–4, 6–4
2008	(Czech Republic) František Čermák (Poland) Łukasz Kubot	(Germany) Philipp Petzschner (Austria) Alexander Peya	6–4, 6–4
2007	(Czech Republic) Tomáš Cibulec (Czech Republic) Jaroslav Levinský	(South Africa) Chris Haggard (Germany) Mischa Zverev	6–4, 2–6, 10–8
2006	(United States) Eric Butorac (United States) Travis Parrott	(Australia) Jordan Kerr (United Kingdom) Jamie Murray	7–5, 6–3
2005	(South Africa) Chris Haggard (Switzerland) Jean-Claude Scherrer	(Slovakia) Dominik Hrbatý (Slovakia) Michal Mertiňák	6–3, 2–6, 7–6^{(7–4)}
2004	(Sweden) Simon Aspelin (United States) Graydon Oliver	(Israel) Jonathan Erlich (Israel) Noam Okun	7–6^{(7–5)}, 6–3
2003	(Israel) Jonathan Erlich (Israel) Harel Levy	(Croatia) Mario Ančić (Argentina) Martín García	7–6^{(9–7)}, 6–3
2002	(United States) Scott Humphries (The Bahamas) Mark Merklein	(Czech Republic) Leoš Friedl (Czech Republic) David Škoch	3–6, 6–4, 6–2
2001	(Czech Republic) Petr Luxa (Czech Republic) Radek Štěpánek	(Czech Republic) František Čermák (Czech Republic) Ota Fukárek	6–4, 6–3
2000	(Australia) Paul Hanley (South Africa) Paul Rosner	(Israel) Jonathan Erlich (North Macedonia) Aleksandar Kitinov	6–4, 6–4

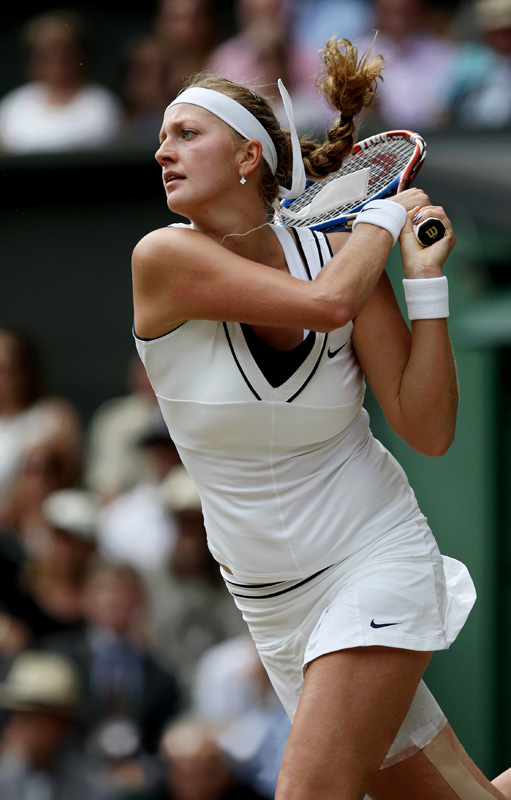
Future Wimbledon winner Petra Kvitová was the 2007 finalist of the women's tournament

=== Women's singles ===
Year	Champion	Runner-up	Score
2026	(Italy) Tyra Caterina Grant	(Germany) Caroline Werner	6–3, 6–3
2025	Alina Korneeva	(Czech Republic) Lucie Havlíčková	7–6^{(9–7)}, 7–5
2024	(Slovakia) Mia Pohánková	(Slovakia) Renáta Jamrichová	2–6, 6–4, 6–2
2023	(Germany) Ella Seidel	Sofya Lansere	6–4, 7–6^{(7–4)}
2022	(Croatia) Ana Konjuh	(Uzbekistan) Nigina Abduraimova	2–6, 6–0, 7–6^{(7–2)}
2017–21	not held		
2016	(Romania) Andreea Mitu	(Czech Republic) Denisa Allertová	6–2, 6–3
2015	(Czech Republic) Jesika Malečková	(Ukraine) Anhelina Kalinina	4–6, 7–6^{(7–3)}, 6–4
2014–12	not held		
2011	(Ukraine) Lesia Tsurenko	(Czech Republic) Karolína Plíšková	7–5, 6–3
2010	(Ukraine) Kateryna Bondarenko	(Russia) Evgeniya Rodina	7–6^{(7–3)}, 6–2
2009	(Russia) Evgeniya Rodina	(Czech Republic) Renata Voráčová	6–4, 6–2
2008	(Russia) Anastasia Pavlyuchenkova	(Netherlands) Michaëlla Krajicek	6–3, 6–1
2007	(Germany) Tatjana Malek	(Czech Republic) Petra Kvitová	6–2, 7–6^{(9–7)}
2006	(Slovakia) Dominika Cibulková	(Germany) Kristina Barrois	7–5, 6–1

=== Women's doubles ===
Year	Champions	Runners-up	Score
2026	(Romania) Irina Bara (United Kingdom) Madeleine Brooks	(Poland) Martyna Kubka (Lithuania) Justina Mikulskytė	7–5, 6–2
2025	(Czech Republic) Lucie Havlíčková (United Kingdom) Lily Miyazaki	(Poland) Martyna Kubka (Czech Republic) Aneta Laboutková	3–6, 6–3, [11–9]
2024	(Netherlands) Isabelle Haverlag; Elena Pridankina	(Slovakia) Katarína Kužmová (Slovakia) Nina Vargová	7–5, 6–2
2023	(France) Estelle Cascino (Czech Republic) Jesika Malečková	(Czech Republic) Denisa Hindová (Czech Republic) Karolína Kubáňová	6–3, 6–2
2022	(Czech Republic) Jesika Malečková (Czech Republic) Renata Voráčová	(Slovakia) Katarína Kužmová (Slovakia) Viktória Kužmová	2–6, 7–5, [13–11]
2017–21	not held		
2016	(United Kingdom) Jocelyn Rae (United Kingdom) Anna Smith	(Netherlands) Quirine Lemoine (Netherlands) Eva Wacanno	6–3, 6–2
2015	(Slovenia) Dalila Jakupović (Germany) Anne Schäfer	(Slovakia) Michaela Hončová (Slovakia) Chantal Škamlová	6–7^{(5–7)}, 6–2, [10–8]
2014–12	not held		
2011	(United Kingdom) Naomi Broady (France) Kristina Mladenovic	(Czech Republic) Karolína Plíšková (Czech Republic) Kristýna Plíšková	5–7, 6–4, [10–2]
2010	(Finland) Emma Laine (France) Irena Pavlovic	(France) Claire Feuerstein (Russia) Valeria Savinykh	6–4, 6–4
2009	(Sweden) Sofia Arvidsson (Netherlands) Michaëlla Krajicek	(Belarus) Tatiana Poutchek (Russia) Arina Rodionova	6–3, 6–4
2008	(Czech Republic) Andrea Hlaváčková (Czech Republic) Lucie Hradecká	(Uzbekistan) Akgul Amanmuradova (Romania) Monica Niculescu	7–6^{(7–1)}, 6–1
2007	(Czech Republic) Renata Voráčová (Czech Republic) Barbora Záhlavová-Strýcová	(Russia) Anastasia Rodionova (Ukraine) Olga Savchuk	6–4, 6–4
2006	(Poland) Klaudia Jans (Poland) Alicja Rosolska	(Czech Republic) Lucie Hradecká (Czech Republic) Michaela Paštiková	6–1, 6–3
