= 2023 UniCredit Czech Open – Doubles =

Doubles
- 2023 UniCredit Czech Open

Final
- Champions: (Uruguay) Ariel Behar (Czech Republic) Adam Pavlásek
- Runners-up: (Italy) Marco Bortolotti (Spain) Sergio Martos Gornés
- Score: 7–5, 6–4

Events
Singles	Doubles
← 2022 ·	UniCredit Czech Open	· 2024 →

Yuki Bhambri and Saketh Myneni were the defending champions but chose not to defend their title.

Ariel Behar and Adam Pavlásek won the title after defeating Marco Bortolotti and Sergio Martos Gornés 7–5, 6–4 in the final.

== Seeds ==
1. (Uruguay) Ariel Behar / (Czech Republic) Adam Pavlásek (champions)
2. (Czech Republic) Roman Jebavý / (Venezuela) Luis David Martínez (first round)
3. (Italy) Marco Bortolotti / (Spain) Sergio Martos Gornés (final)
4. (Ukraine) Vladyslav Manafov / (Poland) Szymon Walków (first round)

== Draw ==
=== Key ===
- Q = Qualifier
- WC = Wild card
- LL = Lucky loser
- Alt = Alternate
- SE = Special exempt
- PR = Protected ranking
- ITF = ITF entry
- JE = Junior exempt
- w/o = Walkover
- r = Retired
- d = Defaulted
- SR = Special ranking

First round
1	(Uruguay) A Behar (Czech Republic) A Pavlásek	6	6
(United States) H Reese (Netherlands) S Verbeek	2	3
WC	(Czech Republic) V Kopřiva (Czech Republic) J Pospíšil	6^{7}	6	[6]
(Switzerland) L Margaroli (Slovakia) I Zelenay	7^{9}	3	[10]
4	(Ukraine) V Manafov (Poland) S Walków	6	4	[7]
(Czech Republic) Z Kolář (Czech Republic) J Menšík	3	6	[10]
(France) T Arribagé (France) L Sanchez	4	6	[10]
(Poland) K Drzewiecki (France) M Guinard	6	4	[4]
(Czech Republic) T Macháč (Sweden) E Ymer	3	3
(Spain) Í Cervantes (Spain) O Roca Batalla	6	6
(Argentina) A Collarini (Italy) L Darderi	2	5
3	(Italy) M Bortolotti (Spain) S Martos Gornés	6	7
WC	(Ukraine) V Sachko (Czech Republic) D Svrčina	6^{2}	3
(Brazil) F Romboli (Brazil) M Zormann	7^{7}	6
(Czech Republic) P Nouza (Czech Republic) A Paulson	6	6
2	(Czech Republic) R Jebavý (Venezuela) LD Martínez	4	4

Quarterfinals
1	(Uruguay) A Behar (Czech Republic) A Pavlásek	7	6
(Switzerland) L Margaroli (Slovakia) I Zelenay	5	0
(Czech Republic) Z Kolář (Czech Republic) J Menšík	7^{13}	7
(France) T Arribagé (France) L Sanchez	6^{11}	5
(Spain) Í Cervantes (Spain) O Roca Batalla	7^{7}	4	[6]
3	(Italy) M Bortolotti (Spain) S Martos Gornés	6^{4}	6	[10]
(Brazil) F Romboli (Brazil) M Zormann	6^{3}	3
(Czech Republic) P Nouza (Czech Republic) A Paulson	7^{7}	6

Semifinals
1	(Uruguay) A Behar (Czech Republic) A Pavlásek	6	6^{5}	[11]
(Czech Republic) Z Kolář (Czech Republic) J Menšík	3	7^{7}	[9]
3	(Italy) M Bortolotti (Spain) S Martos Gornés	6	2	[10]
(Czech Republic) P Nouza (Czech Republic) A Paulson	2	6	[2]

Final
1	(Uruguay) A Behar (Czech Republic) A Pavlásek	7	6
3	(Italy) M Bortolotti (Spain) S Martos Gornés	5	4
