= 2019 Slovak Open – Doubles =

Doubles
- 2019 Slovak Open

Final
- Champions: (Denmark) Frederik Nielsen (Germany) Tim Pütz
- Runners-up: (Czech Republic) Roman Jebavý (Slovakia) Igor Zelenay
- Score: 4–6, 7–6^{(7–4)}, [11–9]

Events
Singles	Doubles
← 2018 ·	Slovak Open	· 2020 →

Denys Molchanov and Igor Zelenay were the defending champions but chose to defend their title with different partners. Molchanov partnered Hans Podlipnik Castillo but lost in the quarterfinals to Jebavý and Zelenay. Zelenay partnered Roman Jebavý but lost in the final to Frederik Nielsen and Tim Pütz.

Nielsen and Pütz won the title after defeating Jebavý and Zelenay 4–6, 7–6^{(7–4)}, [11–9] in the final.

== Seeds ==
1. (Netherlands) Matwé Middelkoop / (Pakistan) Aisam-ul-Haq Qureshi (quarterfinals)
2. (Denmark) Frederik Nielsen / (Germany) Tim Pütz (champions)
3. (Czech Republic) Roman Jebavý / (Slovakia) Igor Zelenay (final)
4. (New Zealand) Artem Sitak / (Belarus) Andrei Vasilevski (first round)

== Draw ==
=== Key ===
- Q = Qualifier
- WC = Wild card
- LL = Lucky loser
- Alt = Alternate
- SE = Special exempt
- PR = Protected ranking
- ITF = ITF entry
- JE = Junior exempt
- w/o = Walkover
- r = Retired
- d = Defaulted
- SR = Special ranking

First round
1	(Netherlands) M Middelkoop (Pakistan) A-u-H Qureshi	6	6
(United States) J Cerretani (Austria) T-S Weissborn	3	4
PR	(Serbia) J Tipsarević (Serbia) N Zimonjić	3	4
WC	(Kazakhstan) A Golubev (Kazakhstan) A Nedovyesov	6	6
3	(Czech Republic) R Jebavý (Slovakia) I Zelenay	6	6
(Italy) S Travaglia (Spain) D Vega Hernández	4	4
(Ukraine) D Molchanov (Chile) H Podlipnik Castillo	6	6
(Bosnia and Herzegovina) T Brkić (Croatia) A Pavić	4	2
(Monaco) R Arneodo (Monaco) H Nys	6	3	[10]
(Netherlands) S Arends (Netherlands) D Pel	1	6	[6]
(United States) N Lammons (United States) N Monroe	4	6	[10]
4	(New Zealand) A Sitak (Belarus) A Vasilevski	6	3	[4]
WC	(Slovakia) L Klein (Slovakia) A Molčan	7	7
WC	(Turkey) T Altuna (Australia) S Puodziunas	5	5
(United Kingdom) K Skupski (Australia) J-P Smith	6^{3}	6^{2}
2	(Denmark) F Nielsen (Germany) T Pütz	7^{7}	7^{7}

Quarterfinals
1	(Netherlands) M Middelkoop (Pakistan) A-u-H Qureshi	6	6^{5}	[8]
WC	(Kazakhstan) A Golubev (Kazakhstan) A Nedovyesov	3	7^{7}	[10]
3	(Czech Republic) R Jebavý (Slovakia) I Zelenay	6^{5}	6	[10]
(Ukraine) D Molchanov (Chile) H Podlipnik Castillo	7^{7}	1	[4]
(Monaco) R Arneodo (Monaco) H Nys	6	6^{5}	[10]
(United States) N Lammons (United States) N Monroe	4	7^{7}	[6]
WC	(Slovakia) L Klein (Slovakia) A Molčan	4	2
2	(Denmark) F Nielsen (Germany) T Pütz	6	6

Semifinals
WC	(Kazakhstan) A Golubev (Kazakhstan) A Nedovyesov	6^{5}	4
3	(Czech Republic) R Jebavý (Slovakia) I Zelenay	7^{7}	6
(Monaco) R Arneodo (Monaco) H Nys	7^{7}	5	[7]
2	(Denmark) F Nielsen (Germany) T Pütz	6^{4}	7	[10]

Final
3	(Czech Republic) R Jebavý (Slovakia) I Zelenay	6	6^{4}	[9]
2	(Denmark) F Nielsen (Germany) T Pütz	4	7^{7}	[11]
