= 2019 Slovak Open =

Slovakian tennis tournament

- Date: 4–10 November
- Edition: 20th
- Category: ATP Challenger Tour
- Surface: Hard (indoor)
- Location: Bratislava, Slovakia

Champions

Singles
- (Austria) Dennis Novak

Doubles
- (Denmark) Frederik Nielsen / (Germany) Tim Pütz
← 2018 ·	Slovak Open	· 2020 →

The 2019 Slovak Open was a professional tennis tournament played on indoor hard courts. It was the 20th edition of the tournament which was part of the 2019 ATP Challenger Tour. It took place in Bratislava, Slovakia between 4 and 10 November 2019.

== Singles main-draw entrants ==
=== Seeds ===
Country	Player	Rank^{1}	Seed
KAZ	Mikhail Kukushkin	67	1
HUN	Márton Fucsovics	69	2
ITA	Stefano Travaglia	88	3
POL	Kamil Majchrzak	90	4
BIH	Damir Džumhur	91	5
AUS	Alexei Popyrin	95	6
ITA	Salvatore Caruso	96	7
RSA	Lloyd Harris	103	8
BLR	Egor Gerasimov	104	9
FRA	Antoine Hoang	107	10
SVK	Norbert Gombos	109	11
GER	Yannick Maden	116	12
GER	Peter Gojowczyk	118	13
CZE	Jiří Veselý	119	14
ITA	Gianluca Mager	120	15
SWE	Elias Ymer	123	16

- ^{1} Rankings are as of 28 October 2019.

=== Other entrants ===
The following players received wildcards into the singles main draw:

- (Slovakia) Andrej Glváč
- (Slovakia) Lukáš Klein
- (Slovakia) Lukáš Lacko
- (Slovakia) Alex Molčan
- (Hungary) Máté Valkusz

The following player received entry into the singles main draw as an alternate:

- (India) Sasikumar Mukund

The following players received entry from the qualifying draw:

- (Czech Republic) Zdeněk Kolář
- (Ukraine) Illya Marchenko

== Champions ==
=== Singles ===
- (Austria) Dennis Novak def. (Bosnia and Herzegovina) Damir Džumhur 6–1, 6–1.

=== Doubles ===
- (Denmark) Frederik Nielsen / (Germany) Tim Pütz def. (Czech Republic) Roman Jebavý / (Slovakia) Igor Zelenay 4–6, 7–6^{(7–4)}, [11–9].
