= 2022 Savannah Challenger – Singles =

Singles
- 2022 Savannah Challenger

Final
- Champion: (United States) Jack Sock
- Runner-up: (United States) Christian Harrison
- Score: 6–4, 6–1

Events
Singles	Doubles
- Savannah Challenger

Federico Coria was the defending champion but chose not to defend his title.

Jack Sock won the title after defeating Christian Harrison 6–4, 6–1 in the final.

== Seeds ==
1. (Argentina) Tomás Martín Etcheverry (quarterfinals)
2. (United States) Stefan Kozlov (first round)
3. (Ecuador) Emilio Gómez (first round, retired)
4. (United States) Jack Sock (champion)
5. (Chile) Tomás Barrios Vera (first round)
6. (United States) J. J. Wolf (semifinals)
7. (United States) Tennys Sandgren (first round)
8. (United States) Bjorn Fratangelo (semifinals)

== Draw ==
Key

- Q = Qualifier
- WC = Wild card
- LL = Lucky loser
- Alt = Alternate
- ITF = ITF entry
- PR = Protected ranking
- SR = Special ranking
- SE = Special exempt
- JE = Junior exempt
- JR = Junior Accelerator Programme entrant
- CO = College Accelerator Programme entrant
- NG = Next Gen Accelerator Program entrant
- w/o = Walkover
- r = Retired
- d = Defaulted

=== Finals ===
Semifinals
(United States) Christian Harrison	6	6
6	(United States) J. J. Wolf	1	3
4	(United States) Jack Sock	6	6
8	(United States) Bjorn Fratangelo	2	4

Final
(United States) Christian Harrison	4	1
4	(United States) Jack Sock	6	6

=== Top half ===
First round
1	(Argentina) TM Etcheverry	6	6
Q	(United States) A Mayo	4	1
Q	(France) A Fils	4	6	6
(Germany) N Kuhn	6	1	3
(United States) C Harrison	6	6
Q	(United States) Ezekiel Clark	1	3
(Canada) A Galarneau	6	6
7	(United States) T Sandgren	3	1
3	(Ecuador) E Gómez	2	4^{r}
(Chinese Taipei) J Jung	6	4
(United States) A Rybakov	6	6
(Japan) K Uchida	3	2
(United States) M Mmoh	3	1^{r}
(Australia) J Kubler	6	1
(India) R Ramanathan	6^{4}	0
6	(United States) J. J. Wolf	7^{7}	6

Second round
1	(Argentina) TM Etcheverry	1	6	3
Q	(France) A Fils	6	3	0^{r}
(United States) C Harrison	6	6
(Canada) A Galarneau	2	3
(Chinese Taipei) J Jung	5	4
(United States) A Rybakov	7	6
(Australia) J Kubler	3	6	2
6	(United States) J. J. Wolf	6	2	6

Quarterfinals
1	(Argentina) TM Etcheverry	4	2
(United States) C Harrison	6	6
(United States) A Rybakov	3	4
6	(United States) J. J. Wolf	6	6

Semifinals
(United States) C Harrison	6	6
6	(United States) J. J. Wolf	1	3

=== Bottom half ===
First round
5	(Chile) T Barrios Vera	2	6	6^{5}
Q	(United States) G Nanda	6	3	7^{7}
Q	(United States) S Kirchheimer	5	3
(China) Zh Zhang	7	6
(Chinese Taipei) T-l Wu	2	5
(India) S Nagal	6	7
(Denmark) M Torpegaard	3	7^{7}	4
4	(United States) J Sock	6	6^{3}	6
8	(United States) B Fratangelo	6	6
Alt	(Egypt) M Safwat	0	0
WC	(United States) N Rubin	2	1
(Netherlands) G Brouwer	6	6
WC	(United States) O Crawford	6	6
WC	(United States) L Tien	3	1
Q	(Brazil) J Pereira	6	6
2	(United States) S Kozlov	1	0

Second round
Q	(United States) G Nanda	4	3
(China) Zh Zhang	6	6
(India) S Nagal	3	3
4	(United States) J Sock	6	6
8	(United States) B Fratangelo	7^{7}	6
(Netherlands) G Brouwer	6^{5}	3
WC	(United States) O Crawford	4	3
Q	(Brazil) J Pereira	6	6

Quarterfinals
(China) Zh Zhang	4	6	3
4	(United States) J Sock	6	3	6
8	(United States) B Fratangelo	6	4	7^{7}
Q	(Brazil) J Pereira	2	6	6^{3}

Semifinals
4	(United States) J Sock	6	6
8	(United States) B Fratangelo	2	4
