= 2019 Slovak Open – Singles =

Singles
- 2019 Slovak Open

Final
- Champion: (Austria) Dennis Novak
- Runner-up: (Bosnia and Herzegovina) Damir Džumhur
- Score: 6–1, 6–1

Events
Singles	Doubles
← 2018 ·	Slovak Open	· 2020 →

Alexander Bublik was the defending champion but chose not to defend his title.

Dennis Novak won the title after defeating Damir Džumhur 6–1, 6–1 in the final.

== Seeds ==
All seeds receive a bye into the second round.

1. (Kazakhstan) Mikhail Kukushkin (quarterfinals, retired)
2. (Hungary) Márton Fucsovics (second round)
3. (Italy) Stefano Travaglia (quarterfinals)
4. (Poland) Kamil Majchrzak (third round)
5. (Bosnia and Herzegovina) Damir Džumhur (final)
6. (Australia) Alexei Popyrin (second round)
7. (Italy) Salvatore Caruso (third round)
8. (South Africa) Lloyd Harris (quarterfinals)
9. (Belarus) Egor Gerasimov (semifinals)
10. (France) Antoine Hoang (second round)
11. (Slovakia) Norbert Gombos (third round)
12. (Germany) Yannick Maden (third round)
13. (Germany) Peter Gojowczyk (third round)
14. (Czech Republic) Jiří Veselý (second round)
15. (Italy) Gianluca Mager (second round)
16. (Sweden) Elias Ymer (second round)

== Draw ==
=== Key ===
- Q = Qualifier
- WC = Wild card
- LL = Lucky loser
- Alt = Alternate
- SE = Special exempt
- PR = Protected ranking
- ITF = ITF entry
- JE = Junior exempt
- w/o = Walkover
- r = Retired
- d = Defaulted
- SR = Special ranking

=== Finals ===
Quarterfinals
1	(Kazakhstan) Mikhail Kukushkin	3	1^{r}
5	(Bosnia and Herzegovina) Damir Džumhur	6	1
Q	(Czech Republic) Zdeněk Kolář	6^{5}	7^{9}	6
8	(South Africa) Lloyd Harris	7^{7}	6^{7}	4
(Austria) Dennis Novak	6	2	7^{7}
3	(Italy) Stefano Travaglia	4	6	6^{5}
9	(Belarus) Egor Gerasimov	7	3	6
(Belarus) Ilya Ivashka	5	6	4

Semifinals
5	(Bosnia and Herzegovina) Damir Džumhur	7^{7}	6
Q	(Czech Republic) Zdeněk Kolář	6^{4}	3
(Austria) Dennis Novak	6	7^{7}
9	(Belarus) Egor Gerasimov	4	6^{2}

Final
5	(Bosnia and Herzegovina) Damir Džumhur	1	1
(Austria) Dennis Novak	6	6

=== Top half ===
==== Section 1 ====
First round
WC	(Hungary) M Valkusz	3	2
(Belgium) K Coppejans	6	6
WC	(Slovakia) L Klein	6	6
(Egypt) M Safwat	2	3
(Finland) E Ruusuvuori	6	3	6
(United States) M Cressy	3	6	4
WC	(Slovakia) L Lacko	7	7^{8}
(Serbia) V Troicki	5	6^{6}

Second round
1	(Kazakhstan) M Kukushkin	6	6
(Belgium) K Coppejans	0	2
WC	(Slovakia) L Klein	4	7^{7}	6
14	(Czech Republic) J Veselý	6	6^{5}	2
10	(France) A Hoang	4	2
(Finland) E Ruusuvuori	6	6
WC	(Slovakia) L Lacko	4	6	1
5	(Bosnia and Herzegovina) D Džumhur	6	3	6

Third round
1	(Kazakhstan) M Kukushkin	6	6^{4}	6
WC	(Slovakia) L Klein	3	7^{7}	4
(Finland) E Ruusuvuori	4	1
5	(Bosnia and Herzegovina) D Džumhur	6	6

Quarterfinals
1	(Kazakhstan) M Kukushkin	3	1^{r}
5	(Bosnia and Herzegovina) D Džumhur	6	1

==== Section 2 ====
First round
Q	(Ukraine) I Marchenko	7	7^{7}
(Kazakhstan) A Nedovyesov	5	6^{2}
(France) C Lestienne	3	6	3
Q	(Czech Republic) Z Kolář	6	4	6
(Germany) O Otte	6	6
Alt	(India) S Mukund	1	2
(France) M Bourgue	4	6^{1}
(Czech Republic) L Rosol	6	7^{7}

Second round
4	(Poland) K Majchrzak	7^{7}	6
Q	(Ukraine) I Marchenko	6^{4}	0
Q	(Czech Republic) Z Kolář	7^{7}	6
15	(Italy) G Mager	6^{5}	4
12	(Germany) Y Maden	6	2	6
(Germany) O Otte	4	6	4
(Czech Republic) L Rosol	6^{5}	6^{5}
8	(South Africa) L Harris	7^{7}	7^{7}

Third round
4	(Poland) K Majchrzak	4	4
Q	(Czech Republic) Z Kolář	6	6
12	(Germany) Y Maden	6	3	3
8	(South Africa) L Harris	1	6	6

Quarterfinals
Q	(Czech Republic) Z Kolář	6^{5}	7^{9}	6
8	(South Africa) L Harris	7^{7}	6^{7}	4

=== Bottom half ===
==== Section 3 ====
First round
(Austria) D Novak	7^{11}	6
(Austria) S Ofner	6^{9}	2
(Germany) C-M Stebe	7	7
(Italy) F Baldi	5	5
(Italy) R Marcora	3	6	7^{7}
(Italy) M Viola	6	3	6^{3}
(Hungary) A Balázs	4	4
(Ukraine) S Stakhovsky	6	6

Second round
6	(Australia) A Popyrin	4	7	4
(Austria) D Novak	6	5	6
(Germany) C-M Stebe	2	0
11	(Slovakia) N Gombos	6	6
16	(Sweden) E Ymer	6	6^{7}	3
(Italy) R Marcora	1	7^{9}	6
(Ukraine) S Stakhovsky	4	5
3	(Italy) S Travaglia	6	7

Third round
(Austria) D Novak	7	6
11	(Slovakia) N Gombos	5	2
(Italy) R Marcora	4	5
3	(Italy) S Travaglia	6	7

Quarterfinals
(Austria) D Novak	6	2	7^{7}
3	(Italy) S Travaglia	4	6	6^{5}

==== Section 4 ====
First round
(Italy) F Gaio	1	6	6
(Belgium) R Bemelmans	6	4	3
(Slovakia) F Horanský	6	6
WC	(Slovakia) Andrej Glváč	4	3
(Serbia) N Milojević	3	4
WC	(Slovakia) A Molčan	6	6
(Belarus) I Ivashka	6	7^{7}
(France) E Benchetrit	1	6^{5}

Second round
7	(Italy) S Caruso	6	6
(Italy) F Gaio	4	4
(Slovakia) F Horanský	3	5
9	(Belarus) E Gerasimov	6	7
13	(Germany) P Gojowczyk	3	7^{7}	6
WC	(Slovakia) A Molčan	6	6^{4}	4
(Belarus) I Ivashka	3	7^{7}	7^{9}
2	(Hungary) M Fucsovics	6	6^{5}	6^{7}

Third round
7	(Italy) S Caruso	3	4
9	(Belarus) E Gerasimov	6	6
13	(Germany) P Gojowczyk	2	6	0
(Belarus) I Ivashka	6	4	6

Quarterfinals
9	(Belarus) E Gerasimov	7	3	6
(Belarus) I Ivashka	5	6	4
