= 2022 Savannah Challenger – Doubles =

Doubles
- 2022 Savannah Challenger

Final
- Champions: (Philippines) Ruben Gonzales (Philippines) Treat Huey
- Runners-up: (Chinese Taipei) Wu Tung-lin (China) Zhang Zhizhen
- Score: 7–6^{(7–3)}, 6–4

Events
Singles	Doubles
- Savannah Challenger

Roberto Maytín and Fernando Romboli were the defending champions but chose not to defend their title.

Ruben Gonzales and Treat Huey won the title after defeating Wu Tung-lin and Zhang Zhizhen 7–6^{(7–3)}, 6–4 in the final.

== Seeds ==
1. (Australia) Luke Saville / (Australia) John-Patrick Smith (semifinals)
2. (United States) Robert Galloway / (United States) Jackson Withrow (semifinals)
3. (India) Purav Raja / (India) Ramkumar Ramanathan (quarterfinals)
4. (Philippines) Ruben Gonzales / (Philippines) Treat Huey (champions)

== Draw ==
Key

- Q = Qualifier
- WC = Wild card
- LL = Lucky loser
- Alt = Alternate
- ITF = ITF entry
- PR = Protected ranking
- SR = Special ranking
- SE = Special exempt
- JE = Junior exempt
- JR = Junior Accelerator Programme entrant
- CO = College Accelerator Programme entrant
- NG = Next Gen Accelerator Program entrant
- w/o = Walkover
- r = Retired
- d = Defaulted

First round
1	(Australia) L Saville (Australia) J-P Smith	6	6
(India) A Chandrasekar (India) VS Prashanth	4	3
(United States) Jack Vance (United States) Tennyson Whiting	1	6^{2}
(United States) T Sandgren (Denmark) M Torpegaard	6	7^{7}
3	(India) P Raja (India) R Ramanathan	6	7
(United States) A Mayo (United States) G Nanda	3	5
(Chinese Taipei) T-l Wu (China) Zh Zhang	6	7^{9}
(Chinese Taipei) J Jung (United States) E King	3	6^{7}
(United States) Ezekiel Clark (Republic of Ireland) O O'Hoisin	4	2
(United States) J Cerretani (South Africa) R Roelofse	6	6
(United States) A Lawson (United States) R Stalder	1	3
4	(Philippines) R Gonzales (Philippines) T Huey	6	6
(United States) Felix Corwin (Denmark) J Ingildsen	2	2
(Netherlands) G Brouwer (United States) C Harrison	6	6
(Australia) A Harris (Australia) J Kubler	4	6	[8]
2	(United States) R Galloway (United States) J Withrow	6	1	[10]

Quarterfinals
1	(Australia) L Saville (Australia) J-P Smith	7	6
(United States) T Sandgren (Denmark) M Torpegaard	5	4
3	(India) P Raja (India) R Ramanathan	5	6^{5}
(Chinese Taipei) T-l Wu (China) Zh Zhang	7	7^{7}
(United States) J Cerretani (South Africa) R Roelofse	2	5
4	(Philippines) R Gonzales (Philippines) T Huey	6	7
(Netherlands) G Brouwer (United States) C Harrison	6	3	[8]
2	(United States) R Galloway (United States) J Withrow	4	6	[10]

Semifinals
1	(Australia) L Saville (Australia) J-P Smith	2	6	[5]
(Chinese Taipei) T-l Wu (China) Zh Zhang	6	3	[10]
4	(Philippines) R Gonzales (Philippines) T Huey	6	6^{5}	[10]
2	(United States) R Galloway (United States) J Withrow	4	7^{7}	[7]

Final
(Chinese Taipei) T-l Wu (China) Zh Zhang	6^{3}	4
4	(Philippines) R Gonzales (Philippines) T Huey	7^{7}	6
