= 2023 UniCredit Czech Open – Singles =

Singles
- 2023 UniCredit Czech Open

Final
- Champion: (Czech Republic) Dalibor Svrčina
- Runner-up: (Czech Republic) Tomáš Macháč
- Score: 6–4, 6–2

Events
Singles	Doubles
- UniCredit Czech Open

Vít Kopřiva was the defending champion but lost in the first round to Máté Valkusz.

Dalibor Svrčina won the title after defeating Tomáš Macháč 6–4, 6–2 in the final.

== Seeds ==
1. (Czech Republic) Jiří Lehečka (quarterfinals)
2. (Argentina) Federico Coria (first round)
3. (Argentina) Facundo Bagnis (second round)
4. (Hungary) Zsombor Piros (second round)
5. (Czech Republic) Tomáš Macháč (final)
6. (Slovakia) Lukáš Klein (semifinals)
7. (Sweden) Elias Ymer (second round, retired)
8. (Italy) Flavio Cobolli (first round)

== Draw ==
Key

- Q = Qualifier
- WC = Wild card
- LL = Lucky loser
- Alt = Alternate
- ITF = ITF entry
- PR = Protected ranking
- SR = Special ranking
- SE = Special exempt
- JE = Junior exempt
- JR = Junior Accelerator Programme entrant
- CO = College Accelerator Programme entrant
- NG = Next Gen Accelerator Program entrant
- w/o = Walkover
- r = Retired
- d = Defaulted

=== Finals ===
Semifinals
6	(Slovakia) Lukáš Klein	3	6	4
Alt	(Czech Republic) Dalibor Svrčina	6	4	6
SE	(Argentina) Francisco Comesaña	4	3
5	(Czech Republic) Tomáš Macháč	6	6

Final
Alt	(Czech Republic) Dalibor Svrčina	6	6
5	(Czech Republic) Tomáš Macháč	4	2

=== Top half ===
First round
1/WC	(Czech Republic) J Lehečka	6	6
(Dominican Republic) N Hardt	3	4
(Netherlands) J Sels	6	6^{2}	6
(Argentina) M Navone	3	7^{7}	3
(United States) Em Nava	7^{7}	6
(Czech Republic) Z Kolář	6^{2}	1
Q	(Brazil) M Pucinelli de Almeida	4	6	4
6	(Slovakia) L Klein	6	3	6
3	(Argentina) F Bagnis	6	7
(Belgium) M Geerts	1	5
(Romania) ND Ionel	2	3
WC	(Czech Republic) J Menšík	6	6
(Italy) L Darderi	7	4	0
Alt	(Czech Republic) D Svrčina	5	6	6
(Austria) D Novak	4	6	2
7	(Sweden) E Ymer	6	2	6

Second round
1/WC	(Czech Republic) J Lehečka	7^{7}	6
(Netherlands) J Sels	6^{3}	3
(United States) Em Nava	3	2
6	(Slovakia) L Klein	6	6
3	(Argentina) F Bagnis	2	3
WC	(Czech Republic) J Menšík	6	6
Alt	(Czech Republic) D Svrčina	4
7	(Sweden) E Ymer	1^{r}

Quarterfinals
1/WC	(Czech Republic) J Lehečka	3	4
6	(Slovakia) L Klein	6	6
WC	(Czech Republic) J Menšík	6^{2}	1
Alt	(Czech Republic) D Svrčina	7^{7}	6

Semifinals
6	(Slovakia) L Klein	3	6	4
Alt	(Czech Republic) D Svrčina	6	4	6

=== Bottom half ===
First round
8	(Italy) F Cobolli	4	4
Q	(Czech Republic) H Bartoň	6	6
WC	(Slovakia) L Pokorný	1	0
(Bulgaria) D Kuzmanov	6	6
SE	(Argentina) F Comesaña	6	6
Q	(Italy) Edoardo Lavagno	3	3
Q	(France) G Mpetshi Perricard	5	4
4	(Hungary) Z Piros	7	6
5	(Czech Republic) T Macháč	6	6
(Portugal) F Ferreira Silva	2	2
(Czech Republic) V Kopřiva	3	6	3
Q	(Hungary) M Valkusz	6	4	6
Q	(Argentina) RA Burruchaga	4	6	6
(Argentina) A Collarini	6	4	3
(France) H Mayot	6	6
2	(Argentina) F Coria	1	2

Second round
Q	(Czech Republic) H Bartoň	6	3	1
(Bulgaria) D Kuzmanov	2	6	6
SE	(Argentina) F Comesaña	7^{10}	4	6
4	(Hungary) Z Piros	6^{8}	6	0
5	(Czech Republic) T Macháč	6	6
Q	(Hungary) M Valkusz	2	0
Q	(Argentina) RA Burruchaga	6	6
(France) H Mayot	4	4

Quarterfinals
(Bulgaria) D Kuzmanov	4	4
SE	(Argentina) F Comesaña	6	6
5	(Czech Republic) T Macháč	7	6
Q	(Argentina) RA Burruchaga	5	2

Semifinals
SE	(Argentina) F Comesaña	4	3
5	(Czech Republic) T Macháč	6	6
