= 2023 UniCredit Czech Open =

- Date: 5 – 10 June
- Edition: 30th
- Surface: Clay
- Location: Prostějov, Czech Republic
- Venue: TK Agrofert Prostějov

Champions

Singles
- (Czech Republic) Dalibor Svrčina

Doubles
- (Uruguay) Ariel Behar / (Czech Republic) Adam Pavlásek
- Czech Open

The 2023 UniCredit Czech Open was a professional tennis tournament played on clay courts. It was the 30th edition of the tournament which was part of the 2023 ATP Challenger Tour. It took place in Prostějov, Czech Republic between 5 and 10 June 2023.

== Singles main-draw entrants ==
=== Seeds ===
Country	Player	Rank^{1}	Seed
CZE	Jiří Lehečka	41	1
ARG	Federico Coria	96	2
ARG	Facundo Bagnis	124	3
HUN	Zsombor Piros	125	4
CZE	Tomáš Macháč	127	5
SVK	Lukáš Klein	133	6
SWE	Elias Ymer	155	7
ITA	Flavio Cobolli	159	8

- ^{1} Rankings are as of 29 May 2023.

=== Other entrants ===
The following players received wildcards into the singles main draw:

- (Czech Republic) Jiří Lehečka
- (Czech Republic) Jakub Menšík
- (Slovakia) Lukáš Pokorný

The following player received entry into the singles main draw as a special exempt:

- (Argentina) Francisco Comesaña

The following player received entry into the singles main draw as an alternate:

- (Czech Republic) Dalibor Svrčina

The following players received entry from the qualifying draw:

- (Czech Republic) Hynek Bartoň
- (Argentina) Román Andrés Burruchaga
- (Italy) Edoardo Lavagno
- (France) Giovanni Mpetshi Perricard
- (Brazil) Matheus Pucinelli de Almeida
- (Hungary) Máté Valkusz

== Champions ==
=== Singles ===
- (Czech Republic) Dalibor Svrčina def. (Czech Republic) Tomáš Macháč 6–4, 6–2.

=== Doubles ===
- (Uruguay) Ariel Behar / (Czech Republic) Adam Pavlásek def. (Italy) Marco Bortolotti / (Spain) Sergio Martos Gornés 7–5, 6–4.
