= 2022 Kozerki Open – Doubles =

Doubles
- 2022 Kozerki Open

Final
- Champions: (Netherlands) Robin Haase (Austria) Philipp Oswald
- Runners-up: (Monaco) Hugo Nys (France) Fabien Reboul
- Score: 6–3, 6–4

Events
Singles	Doubles
Kozerki Open	· 2023 →

This was the first edition of the tournament.

Robin Haase and Philipp Oswald won the title after defeating Hugo Nys and Fabien Reboul 6–3, 6–4 in the final.

== Seeds ==
1. (Netherlands) Robin Haase / (Austria) Philipp Oswald (champions)
2. (Monaco) Hugo Nys / (France) Fabien Reboul (final)
3. (Monaco) Romain Arneodo / (United Kingdom) Jonny O'Mara (semifinals)
4. (Austria) Alexander Erler / (Austria) Tristan-Samuel Weissborn (semifinals)

== Draw ==
=== Key ===
- Q = Qualifier
- WC = Wild card
- LL = Lucky loser
- Alt = Alternate
- ITF = ITF entry
- PR = Protected ranking
- SR = Special ranking
- SE = Special exempt
- JE = Junior exempt
- JR = Junior Accelerator Programme entrant
- CO = College Accelerator Programme entrant
- NG = Next Gen Accelerator Program entrant
- w/o = Walkover
- r = Retired
- d = Defaulted

First round
1	(Netherlands) R Haase (Austria) P Oswald	6	6
(Poland) K Drzewiecki (Finland) P Niklas-Salminen	4	4
WC	(Poland) S Kielan (Poland) Yann Wójcik	7^{7}	4	[8]
(France) D Added (France) A Olivetti	6^{3}	6	[10]
4	(Austria) A Erler (Austria) T-S Weissborn	6	6
(Uzbekistan) S Fayziev (Ukraine) O Krutykh	4	4
(Netherlands) D Pel (Poland) S Walków	6	6
(Poland) P Matuszewski (Ukraine) V Sachko	2	3
(India) S Balaji (India) J Nedunchezhiyan	2	7^{7}	[10]
(Bolivia) B Arias (Bolivia) F Zeballos	6	6^{3}	[8]
(Ukraine) V Manafov (Switzerland) L Margaroli	5	3
3	(Monaco) R Arneodo (United Kingdom) J O'Mara	7	6
(Romania) VV Cornea (Netherlands) B Stevens	6	6
WC	(Poland) J Janowicz (Poland) K Majchrzak	3	4
(United Kingdom) L Johnson (Tunisia) S Mansouri	6	3	[8]
2	(Monaco) H Nys (France) F Reboul	2	6	[10]

Quarterfinals
1	(Netherlands) R Haase (Austria) P Oswald	4	6	[11]
(France) D Added (France) A Olivetti	6	3	[9]
4	(Austria) A Erler (Austria) T-S Weissborn	6^{2}	6	[10]
(Netherlands) D Pel (Poland) S Walków	7^{7}	3	[7]
(India) S Balaji (India) J Nedunchezhiyan	5	6^{6}
3	(Monaco) R Arneodo (United Kingdom) J O'Mara	7	7^{8}
(Romania) VV Cornea (Netherlands) B Stevens	3	5
2	(Monaco) H Nys (France) F Reboul	6	7

Semifinals
1	(Netherlands) R Haase (Austria) P Oswald	6	6
4	(Austria) A Erler (Austria) T-S Weissborn	4	2
3	(Monaco) R Arneodo (United Kingdom) J O'Mara	3	4
2	(Monaco) H Nys (France) F Reboul	6	6

Final
1	(Netherlands) R Haase (Austria) P Oswald	6	6
2	(Monaco) H Nys (France) F Reboul	3	4
