= 2022 Kozerki Open =

- Date: 15–21 August
- Edition: 1st
- Draw: 32S / 16D
- Surface: Hard
- Location: Grodzisk Mazowiecki, Poland

Champions

Singles
- (Czech Republic) Tomáš Macháč

Doubles
- (Netherlands) Robin Haase / (Austria) Philipp Oswald
Kozerki Open	· 2023 →

The 2022 Kozerki Open was a professional tennis tournament played on hard courts. It was the first edition of the tournament which was part of the 2022 ATP Challenger Tour. It took place in Grodzisk Mazowiecki, Poland between 15 and 21 August 2022.

== Singles main-draw entrants ==
=== Seeds ===
Country	Player	Rank^{1}	Seed
POL	Kamil Majchrzak	88	1
ESP	Pablo Andújar	92	2
AUT	Jurij Rodionov	139	3
GER	Maximilian Marterer	158	4
CZE	Tomáš Macháč	160	5
CHN	Zhang Zhizhen	161	6
ESP	Nicolás Álvarez Varona	223	7
AUT	Sebastian Ofner	225	8

- ^{1} Rankings were as of 8 August 2022.

=== Other entrants ===
The following players received wildcards into the singles main draw:

- (Poland) Jerzy Janowicz
- (Poland) Maks Kaśnikowski
- (Poland) Szymon Kielan

The following player received entry into the singles main draw as an alternate:

- (Brazil) Gabriel Décamps

The following players received entry from the qualifying draw:

- (Tunisia) Skander Mansouri
- (Poland) Michał Mikuła
- (Italy) Luca Potenza
- (Brazil) Thiago Seyboth Wild
- (Germany) Marko Topo
- Alexey Vatutin

== Champions ==
=== Singles ===
- (Czech Republic) Tomáš Macháč def. (China) Zhang Zhizhen 1–6, 6–3, 6–2.

=== Doubles ===
- (Netherlands) Robin Haase / (Austria) Philipp Oswald def. (Monaco) Hugo Nys / (France) Fabien Reboul 6–3, 6–4.
