= 2024 Australian Open – Men's doubles =

Men's doubles
- 2024 Australian Open

Final
- Champions: (India) Rohan Bopanna (Australia) Matthew Ebden
- Runners-up: (Italy) Simone Bolelli (Italy) Andrea Vavassori
- Score: 7–6^{(7–0)}, 7–5

Details
- Draw: 64
- Seeds: 16

Events
Singles	men	women		boys	girls
Doubles	men	women	mixed	boys	girls
WC Singles	men	women	quad	boys	girls
WC Doubles	men	women	quad	boys	girls
- Australian Open

Rohan Bopanna and Matthew Ebden defeated Simone Bolelli and Andrea Vavassori in the final, 7–6^{(7–0)}, 7–5 to win the men's doubles tennis title at the 2024 Australian Open. It was Bopanna's first and only major title in doubles, and Ebden's second. Bopanna, at 43 years, 10 months and 24 days old, became the oldest man in the Open Era to win a major title.

Rinky Hijikata and Jason Kubler were the defending champions, but lost in the second round to Yannick Hanfmann and Dominik Koepfer.

Bopanna attained the ATP No. 1 doubles ranking for the first time by reaching the semifinals, and in doing so became the oldest first-time No.1 in history. Austin Krajicek, Rajeev Ram, Wesley Koolhof, Neal Skupski, Édouard Roger-Vasselin and Horacio Zeballos were also in contention at the start of the tournament.

By virtue of Ebden's win with Bopanna, this would be the third consecutive year in which an Australian man won the title, after Thanasi Kokkinakis and Nick Kyrgios in 2022, and Hijikata and Kubler in 2023. It also marked the fifth Australian Open doubles final contested by one or multiple Australian men in the last six years.

Jean-Julien Rojer was vying to complete the career Grand Slam, but lost to Hugo Nys and Jan Zieliński in the third round.

== Seeds ==
1. (Croatia) Ivan Dodig / (United States) Austin Krajicek (second round)
2. (India) Rohan Bopanna / (Australia) Matthew Ebden (champions)
3. (United States) Rajeev Ram / (United Kingdom) Joe Salisbury (third round)
4. (Spain) Marcel Granollers / (Argentina) Horacio Zeballos (third round)
5. (Mexico) Santiago González / (United Kingdom) Neal Skupski (third round)
6. (Argentina) Máximo González / (Argentina) Andrés Molteni (quarterfinals)
7. (Monaco) Hugo Nys / (Poland) Jan Zieliński (quarterfinals)
8. (Germany) Kevin Krawietz / (Germany) Tim Pütz (quarterfinals)
9. (United Kingdom) Jamie Murray / (New Zealand) Michael Venus (first round)
10. (El Salvador) Marcelo Arévalo / (Croatia) Mate Pavić (third round)
11. (United Kingdom) Lloyd Glasspool / (Netherlands) Jean-Julien Rojer (third round)
12. (United States) Nathaniel Lammons / (United States) Jackson Withrow (third round)
13. (France) Nicolas Mahut / (France) Édouard Roger-Vasselin (second round)
14. (Netherlands) Wesley Koolhof / (Croatia) Nikola Mektić (third round)
15. (Belgium) Sander Gillé / (Belgium) Joran Vliegen (first round)
16. (Australia) Rinky Hijikata / (Australia) Jason Kubler (second round)

Click on the seed number of a player to go to their draw section.

== Draw ==
Key

- Q = Qualifier
- WC = Wild card
- LL = Lucky loser
- Alt = Alternate
- ITF = ITF entry
- PR = Protected ranking
- SR = Special ranking
- SE = Special exempt
- JE = Junior exempt
- JR = Junior Accelerator Programme entrant
- CO = College Accelerator Programme entrant
- NG = Next Gen Accelerator Program entrant
- w/o = Walkover
- r = Retired
- d = Defaulted

=== Finals ===
Quarterfinals
(Italy) Simone Bolelli (Italy) Andrea Vavassori	7	6
8	(Germany) Kevin Krawietz (Germany) Tim Pütz	5	4
(Germany) Yannick Hanfmann (Germany) Dominik Koepfer	6	7^{7}
7	(Monaco) Hugo Nys (Poland) Jan Zieliński	4	6^{3}
(Uruguay) Ariel Behar (Czech Republic) Adam Pavlásek	3	1
(Czech Republic) Tomáš Macháč (China) Zhang Zhizhen	6	6
6	(Argentina) Máximo González (Argentina) Andrés Molteni	4	6^{5}
2	(India) Rohan Bopanna (Australia) Matthew Ebden	6	7^{7}

Semifinals
(Italy) Simone Bolelli (Italy) Andrea Vavassori	6	3	7^{10}
(Germany) Yannick Hanfmann (Germany) Dominik Koepfer	3	6	6^{5}
(Czech Republic) Tomáš Macháč (China) Zhang Zhizhen	3	6	6^{7}
2	(India) Rohan Bopanna (Australia) Matthew Ebden	6	3	7^{10}

Final
(Italy) Simone Bolelli (Italy) Andrea Vavassori	6^{0}	5
2	(India) Rohan Bopanna (Australia) Matthew Ebden	7^{7}	7

=== Top half ===
==== Section 1 ====
First round
1	(Croatia) I Dodig (United States) A Krajicek	3	6	6
(Serbia) M Kecmanović; R Safiullin	6	1	2
(Japan) B McLachlan (Japan) Y Nishioka	6	3	5
(Serbia) N Ćaćić (Ukraine) D Molchanov	3	6	7
(Monaco) R Arneodo (Austria) S Weissborn	6	3	6^{7}
(Italy) S Bolelli (Italy) A Vavassori	3	6	7^{10}
(Argentina) F Cerúndolo (Argentina) TM Etcheverry	4	1
13	(France) N Mahut (France) É Roger-Vasselin	6	6
10	(El Salvador) M Arévalo (Croatia) M Pavić	7^{7}	6
(Germany) C Frantzen (Germany) H Jebens	6^{5}	3
(Italy) M Arnaldi (Italy) A Pellegrino	3	4
Alt	(India) S Balaji (Romania) VV Cornea	6	6
(Argentina) S Báez (Brazil) T Seyboth Wild	4	2
(France) A Müller (Austria) S Ofner	6	6
PR	(United States) M Giron (South Korea) S-w Kwon	2	0
8	(Germany) K Krawietz (Germany) T Pütz	6	6

Second round
1	(Croatia) I Dodig (United States) A Krajicek	4	7^{10}	6^{7}
(Serbia) N Ćaćić (Ukraine) D Molchanov	6	6^{8}	7^{10}
(Italy) S Bolelli (Italy) A Vavassori	7^{7}	5	6
13	(France) N Mahut (France) É Roger-Vasselin	6^{5}	7	3
10	(El Salvador) M Arévalo (Croatia) M Pavić	6	6
Alt	(India) S Balaji (Romania) VV Cornea	3	3
(France) A Müller (Austria) S Ofner	2	2
8	(Germany) K Krawietz (Germany) T Pütz	6	6

Third round
(Serbia) N Ćaćić (Ukraine) D Molchanov	2	2
(Italy) S Bolelli (Italy) A Vavassori	6	6
10	(El Salvador) M Arévalo (Croatia) M Pavić	3	3
8	(Germany) K Krawietz (Germany) T Pütz	6	6

Quarterfinals
(Italy) S Bolelli (Italy) A Vavassori	7	6
8	(Germany) K Krawietz (Germany) T Pütz	5	4

==== Section 2 ====
First round
4	(Spain) M Granollers (Argentina) H Zeballos	6	7^{7}
(United States) E King (United States) R Stalder	3	6^{3}
(Germany) A Mies (Australia) J-P Smith	6^{4}	6	6
(Australia) T Kokkinakis (Australia) A Popyrin	7^{7}	4	4
(Germany) Y Hanfmann (Germany) D Koepfer	6	6
(United States) C Eubanks (United States) B Shelton	4	4
(Serbia) L Djere (Australia) C O'Connell	2	4
16	(Australia) R Hijikata (Australia) J Kubler	6	6
11	(United Kingdom) L Glasspool (Netherlands) J-J Rojer	7^{7}	6
(Netherlands) T Griekspoor (Netherlands) B Stevens	6^{2}	2
(Sweden) A Göransson (France) A Olivetti	6	7
WC	(Australia) B Ellis (Australia) A Harris	1	5
(Austria) A Erler (Austria) L Miedler	2	6^{8}
(Australia) M Purcell (Australia) J Thompson	6	7^{10}
WC	(Australia) J McCabe (Australia) D Sweeny	7^{7}	5	2
7	(Monaco) H Nys (Poland) J Zieliński	6^{5}	7	6

Second round
4	(Spain) M Granollers (Argentina) H Zeballos	6	6
(Germany) A Mies (Australia) J-P Smith	4	4
(Germany) Y Hanfmann (Germany) D Koepfer	6	4	6
16	(Australia) R Hijikata (Australia) J Kubler	4	6	3
11	(United Kingdom) L Glasspool (Netherlands) J-J Rojer	7^{7}	4	6
(Sweden) A Göransson (France) A Olivetti	6^{3}	6	2
(Australia) M Purcell (Australia) J Thompson	3	7^{7}	1
7	(Monaco) H Nys (Poland) J Zieliński	6	6^{5}	6

Third round
4	(Spain) M Granollers (Argentina) H Zeballos	6^{5}	7^{7}	4
(Germany) Y Hanfmann (Germany) D Koepfer	7^{7}	6^{3}	6
11	(United Kingdom) L Glasspool (Netherlands) J-J Rojer	6	4	6^{3}
7	(Monaco) H Nys (Poland) J Zieliński	3	6	7^{10}

Quarterfinals
(Germany) Y Hanfmann (Germany) D Koepfer	6	7^{7}
7	(Monaco) H Nys (Poland) J Zieliński	4	6^{3}

=== Bottom half ===
==== Section 3 ====
First round
5	(Mexico) S González (United Kingdom) N Skupski	7^{8}	6
(United States) M McDonald (Netherlands) B van de Zandschulp	6^{6}	1
(Portugal) F Cabral (United Kingdom) H Patten	6	6^{6}	7^{10}
WC	(Australia) T Schoolkate (Australia) A Walton	3	7^{8}	6^{4}
(Colombia) N Barrientos (Brazil) R Matos	1	7^{10}	7^{10}
(India) Y Bhambri (Netherlands) R Haase	6	6^{8}	6^{7}
(Uruguay) A Behar (Czech Republic) A Pavlásek	6	6
9	(United Kingdom) J Murray (New Zealand) M Venus	2	4
15	(Belgium) S Gillé (Belgium) J Vliegen	4	5
(Czech Republic) T Macháč (China) Z Zhang	6	7
WC	(India) A Chandrasekar (India) VS Prashanth	3	4
(Hungary) M Fucsovics (Hungary) F Marozsán	6	6
(Greece) Pe Tsitsipas (Greece) S Tsitsipas	5	5
(Germany) D Altmaier (Mexico) MÁ Reyes-Varela	7	7
(Brazil) M Melo (Netherlands) M Middelkoop	6^{4}	5
3	(United States) R Ram (United Kingdom) J Salisbury	7^{7}	7

Second round
5	(Mexico) S González (United Kingdom) N Skupski	6	6
(Portugal) F Cabral (United Kingdom) H Patten	3	4
(Colombia) N Barrientos (Brazil) R Matos	3	6^{9}
(Uruguay) A Behar (Czech Republic) A Pavlásek	6	7^{11}
(Czech Republic) T Macháč (China) Z Zhang	7^{7}	6
(Hungary) M Fucsovics (Hungary) F Marozsán	6^{2}	3
(Germany) D Altmaier (Mexico) MÁ Reyes-Varela	2	4
3	(United States) R Ram (United Kingdom) J Salisbury	6	6

Third round
5	(Mexico) S González (United Kingdom) N Skupski	6	6^{1}	4
(Uruguay) A Behar (Czech Republic) A Pavlásek	3	7^{7}	6
(Czech Republic) T Macháč (China) Z Zhang	3	6	6
3	(United States) R Ram (United Kingdom) J Salisbury	6	3	2

Quarterfinals
(Uruguay) A Behar (Czech Republic) A Pavlásek	3	1
(Czech Republic) T Macháč (China) Z Zhang	6	6

==== Section 4 ====
First round
6	(Argentina) M González (Argentina) A Molteni	6	6
(Argentina) P Cachín (Spain) R Carballés Baena	2	2
(Ecuador) G Escobar (Kazakhstan) A Nedovyesov	3	7^{7}	6^{7}
(Portugal) N Borges (Australia) A Vukic	6	6^{4}	7^{10}
(France) Q Halys (France) A Mannarino	5	7	6
(United Kingdom) J Cash (United States) R Galloway	7	5	1
(Czech Republic) J Lehečka (Czech Republic) P Nouza	6	5	4
12	(United States) N Lammons (United States) J Withrow	3	7	6
14	(Netherlands) W Koolhof (Croatia) N Mektić	7^{7}	2	6
(France) S Doumbia (France) F Reboul	6^{4}	6	3
WC	(Australia) A Bolt (Australia) L Saville	3	6^{4}
(Finland) H Heliövaara (Australia) J Peers	6	7^{7}
PR	(New Zealand) M Daniell (Brazil) M Demoliner	7^{7}	2	6^{12}
WC	(Australia) J Millman (Australia) E Winter	6^{3}	6	7^{14}
WC	(Australia) J Duckworth (Australia) M Polmans	6^{5}	6	6^{2}
2	(India) R Bopanna (Australia) M Ebden	7^{7}	4	7^{10}

Second round
6	(Argentina) M González (Argentina) A Molteni	w/o
(Portugal) N Borges (Australia) A Vukic
(France) Q Halys (France) A Mannarino
12	(United States) N Lammons (United States) J Withrow	w/o
14	(Netherlands) W Koolhof (Croatia) N Mektić	6	6
(Finland) H Heliövaara (Australia) J Peers	1	4
WC	(Australia) J Millman (Australia) E Winter	2	4
2	(India) R Bopanna (Australia) M Ebden	6	6

Third round
6	(Argentina) M González (Argentina) A Molteni	7^{7}	3	7^{10}
12	(United States) N Lammons (United States) J Withrow	6^{5}	6	6^{5}
14	(Netherlands) W Koolhof (Croatia) N Mektić	6^{8}	6^{4}
2	(India) R Bopanna (Australia) M Ebden	7^{10}	7^{7}

Quarterfinals
6	(Argentina) M González (Argentina) A Molteni	4	6^{5}
2	(India) R Bopanna (Australia) M Ebden	6	7^{7}

== Seeded teams ==
The following are the seeded teams, based on ATP rankings as of 8 January 2024.

Country	Player	Country	Player	Rank	Seed
CRO	Ivan Dodig	USA	Austin Krajicek	3	1
IND	Rohan Bopanna	AUS	Matthew Ebden	7	2
USA	Rajeev Ram	GBR	Joe Salisbury	13	3
ESP	Marcel Granollers	ARG	Horacio Zeballos	15	4
MEX	Santiago González	GBR	Neal Skupski	20	5
ARG	Máximo González	ARG	Andrés Molteni	26	6
MON	Hugo Nys	POL	Jan Zieliński	37	7
GER	Kevin Krawietz	GER	Tim Pütz	39	8
GBR	Jamie Murray	NZL	Michael Venus	41	9
ESA	Marcelo Arévalo	CRO	Mate Pavić	45	10
GBR	Lloyd Glasspool	NED	Jean-Julien Rojer	47	11
USA	Nathaniel Lammons	USA	Jackson Withrow	48	12
FRA	Nicolas Mahut	FRA	Édouard Roger-Vasselin	49	13
NED	Wesley Koolhof	CRO	Nikola Mektić	51	14
BEL	Sander Gillé	BEL	Joran Vliegen	52	15
AUS	Rinky Hijikata	AUS	Jason Kubler	55	16

== Other entry information ==
=== Wild cards ===
- (Australia) Alex Bolt / (Australia) Luke Saville
- (India) Anirudh Chandrasekar / (India) Vijay Sundar Prashanth
- (Australia) James Duckworth / (Australia) Marc Polmans
- (Australia) Blake Ellis / (Australia) Andrew Harris
- (Australia) James McCabe / (Australia) Dane Sweeny
- (Australia) John Millman / (Australia) Edward Winter
- (Australia) Tristan Schoolkate / (Australia) Adam Walton

=== Protected ranking ===
- (New Zealand) Marcus Daniell / (Brazil) Marcelo Demoliner
- (United States) Marcos Giron / (South Korea) Kwon Soon-woo

=== Alternates ===
- (India) Sriram Balaji / (Romania) Victor Vlad Cornea

=== Withdrawals ===
- (Kazakhstan) Alexander Bublik / Aslan Karatsev → replaced by (India) Sriram Balaji / (Romania) Victor Vlad Cornea
- (Croatia) Borna Gojo / (Serbia) Miomir Kecmanović → replaced by (Serbia) Miomir Kecmanović / Roman Safiullin
