= 2022 Savannah Challenger =

- Date: 25 April – 1 May
- Edition: 12th
- Surface: Green clay
- Location: Savannah, Georgia, United States

Champions

Singles
- (United States) Jack Sock

Doubles
- (Philippines) Ruben Gonzales / (Philippines) Treat Huey
- Savannah Challenger

The 2022 Savannah Challenger was a professional tennis tournament played on clay courts. It was the twelfth edition of the tournament which was part of the 2022 ATP Challenger Tour. It took place in Savannah, Georgia, United States between April 25 and May 1, 2022.

== Singles main-draw entrants ==
=== Seeds ===
Country	Player	Rank^{1}	Seed
ARG	Tomás Martín Etcheverry	95	1
USA	Stefan Kozlov	123	2
ECU	Emilio Gómez	130	3
USA	Jack Sock	139	4
CHI	Tomás Barrios Vera	141	5
USA	J. J. Wolf	145	6
USA	Tennys Sandgren	170	7
USA	Bjorn Fratangelo	176	8

- ^{1} Rankings are as of April 18, 2022.

=== Other entrants ===
The following players received wildcards into the singles main draw:

- (United States) Oliver Crawford
- (United States) Noah Rubin
- (United States) Learner Tien

The following player received entry into the singles main draw as an alternate:

- (Egypt) Mohamed Safwat

The following players received entry from the qualifying draw:

- (United States) Ezekiel Clark
- (France) Arthur Fils
- (United States) Strong Kirchheimer
- (United States) Aidan Mayo
- (United States) Govind Nanda
- (Brazil) José Pereira

== Champions ==
=== Singles ===
- (United States) Jack Sock def. (United States) Christian Harrison 6–4, 6–1.

=== Doubles ===
- (Philippines) Ruben Gonzales / (Philippines) Treat Huey def. (Chinese Taipei) Wu Tung-lin / (China) Zhang Zhizhen 7–6^{(7–3)}, 6–4.
