= 2022 Kozerki Open – Singles =

Singles
- 2022 Kozerki Open

Final
- Champion: (Czech Republic) Tomáš Macháč
- Runner-up: (China) Zhang Zhizhen
- Score: 1–6, 6–3, 6–2

Events
Singles	Doubles
Kozerki Open	· 2023 →

This was the first edition of the tournament.

Tomáš Macháč won the title after defeating Zhang Zhizhen 1–6, 6–3, 6–2 in the final.

== Seeds ==
1. (Poland) Kamil Majchrzak (first round)
2. (Spain) Pablo Andújar (second round, retired)
3. (Austria) Jurij Rodionov (second round)
4. (Germany) Maximilian Marterer (first round)
5. (Czech Republic) Tomáš Macháč (champion)
6. (China) Zhang Zhizhen (final)
7. (Spain) Nicolás Álvarez Varona (first round)
8. (Austria) Sebastian Ofner (second round)

== Draw ==
=== Key ===
- Q = Qualifier
- WC = Wild card
- LL = Lucky loser
- Alt = Alternate
- SE = Special exempt
- PR = Protected ranking
- ITF = ITF entry
- JE = Junior exempt
- w/o = Walkover
- r = Retired
- d = Defaulted
- SR = Special ranking

=== Finals ===
Semifinals
6	(China) Zhang Zhizhen	6	6
(France) Harold Mayot	3	4
5	(Czech Republic) Tomáš Macháč	6	7
Q	(Tunisia) Skander Mansouri	4	5

Final
6	(China) Zhang Zhizhen	6	3	2
5	(Czech Republic) Tomáš Macháč	1	6	6

=== Top half ===
First round
1	(Poland) K Majchrzak	4	2
(Serbia) H Međedović	6	6
(Poland) K Żuk	3	4
(Netherlands) R Haase	6	6
(Turkey) E Kırkın	6^{1}	3
(Ukraine) I Marchenko	7^{7}	6
(France) M Janvier	6	3	4
6	(China) Zh Zhang	4	6	6
4	(Germany) M Marterer	4	2
(France) H Mayot	6	6
WC	(Poland) J Janowicz	6	6
Q	(Brazil) T Seyboth Wild	4	4
Alt	(Brazil) G Décamps	6^{4}	6	7^{11}
(Ukraine) O Krutykh	7^{7}	2	6^{9}
WC	(Poland) S Kielan	3	6	4
8	(Austria) S Ofner	6	1	6

Second round
(Serbia) H Međedović	4	6^{2}
(Netherlands) R Haase	6	7^{7}
(Ukraine) I Marchenko	6^{5}	1
6	(China) Zh Zhang	7^{7}	6
(France) H Mayot	6	5	6
WC	(Poland) J Janowicz	4	7	3
Alt	(Brazil) G Décamps	7^{7}	6
8	(Austria) S Ofner	6^{3}	4

Quarterfinals
(Netherlands) R Haase	7	3	2
6	(China) Zh Zhang	5	6	6
(France) H Mayot	6	7^{7}
Alt	(Brazil) G Décamps	4	6^{0}

Semifinals
6	(China) Zh Zhang	6	6
(France) H Mayot	3	4

=== Bottom half ===
First round
5	(Czech Republic) T Macháč	6	6
(Serbia) M Zekić	3	2
(Bosnia and Herzegovina) M Bašić	3	2
(France) D Added	6	6
(Belgium) M Geerts	6^{4}	1
Q	(Germany) M Topo	7^{7}	6
(Germany) H Squire	3	4
3	(Austria) J Rodionov	6	6
7	(Spain) N Álvarez Varona	5	3
WC	(Poland) M Kaśnikowski	7	6
Q	(Tunisia) S Mansouri	6	6
Q	(Poland) Michał Mikuła	1	4
Q	(Italy) Luca Potenza	4	6	1
Q	A Vatutin	6	1	6
(Ukraine) V Sachko	2	6	4
2	(Spain) P Andújar	6	2	6

Second round
5	(Czech Republic) T Macháč	6	6
(France) D Added	2	2
Q	(Germany) M Topo	6	7^{7}
3	(Austria) J Rodionov	4	6^{3}
WC	(Poland) M Kaśnikowski	4	4
Q	(Tunisia) S Mansouri	6	6
Q	A Vatutin	3	3
2	(Spain) P Andújar	6	3^{r}

Quarterfinals
5	(Czech Republic) T Macháč	7^{7}	6
Q	(Germany) M Topo	6^{5}	0
Q	(Tunisia) S Mansouri	6	6
Q	A Vatutin	4	2

Semifinals
5	(Czech Republic) T Macháč	6	7
Q	(Tunisia) S Mansouri	4	5
