= 2020 Slovak Open =

Slovakian tennis tournament

- Date: 9–15 November
- Edition: 21st
- Category: ATP Challenger Tour
- Surface: Hard (indoor)
- Location: Bratislava, Slovakia

Champions

Singles
- (Germany) Maximilian Marterer

Doubles
- (Finland) Harri Heliövaara / (Finland) Emil Ruusuvuori
- Slovak Open

The 2020 Peugeot Slovak Open was a professional tennis tournament played on indoor hard courts. It was the 21st edition of the tournament which was part of the 2020 ATP Challenger Tour. It took place in Bratislava, Slovakia between 9 and 15 November 2020.

== Singles main-draw entrants ==
=== Seeds ===
Country	Player	Rank^{1}	Seed
FIN	Emil Ruusuvuori	84	1
JPN	Yasutaka Uchiyama	101	2
POL	Kamil Majchrzak	106	3
FRA	Antoine Hoang	129	4
SUI	Henri Laaksonen	132	5
SRB	Nikola Milojević	134	6
ITA	Federico Gaio	137	7
ITA	Lorenzo Giustino	147	8

- ^{1} Rankings are as of 2 November 2020.

=== Other entrants ===
The following players received wildcards into the singles main draw:

- (Slovakia) Lukáš Klein
- (Czech Republic) Jiří Lehečka
- (Slovakia) Alex Molčan

The following player received entry into the singles main draw using a protected ranking:

- (Germany) Maximilian Marterer

The following players received entry into the singles main draw as special exempts:

- (Italy) Andrea Arnaboldi
- (France) Quentin Halys

The following player received entry into the singles main draw as an alternate:

- (Italy) Matteo Viola

The following players received entry from the qualifying draw:

- (France) Mathias Bourgue
- (Germany) Julian Lenz
- (Czech Republic) Tomáš Macháč
- (Canada) Brayden Schnur

== Champions ==
=== Singles ===
- (Germany) Maximilian Marterer def. (Czech Republic) Tomáš Macháč 6–7^{(3–7)}, 6–2, 7–5.

=== Doubles ===
- (Finland) Harri Heliövaara / (Finland) Emil Ruusuvuori def. (Slovakia) Lukáš Klein / (Slovakia) Alex Molčan 6–4, 6–3.
