= Tomáš Macháč =

Czech tennis player (born 2000)

- Macháč at the 2023 US Open
- Country (sports): Czech Republic
- Residence: Prague, Czech Republic
- Born: 13 October 2000 (age 26) Beroun, Czech Republic
- Height: 1.83 m (6 ft 0 in)
- Turned pro: 2017
- Plays: Right-handed (two-handed backhand)
- Coach: Daniel Vacek
- Prize money: US $7,540,423

Singles
- Career record: 89–78
- Career titles: 2
- Highest ranking: No. 20 (3 March 2025)
- Current ranking: No. 60 (9 November 2026)

Grand Slam singles results
- Australian Open: 3R (2024, 2025, 2026)
- French Open: 3R (2024)
- Wimbledon: 2R (2024, 2025)
- US Open: 4R (2024, 2025)

Other tournaments
- Olympic Games: 2R (2021, 2024)

Doubles
- Career record: 38–34
- Career titles: 1
- Highest ranking: No. 46 (30 September 2024)
- Current ranking: No. 245 (16 November 2026)

Grand Slam doubles results
- Australian Open: SF (2024)
- French Open: QF (2024)
- Wimbledon: 2R (2024)
- US Open: QF (2025)

Other doubles tournaments
- Olympic Games: SF (2024)

Mixed doubles
- Career titles: 1

Grand Slam mixed doubles results
- Australian Open: 1R (2022)
- French Open: 1R (2024)

Other mixed doubles tournaments
- Olympic Games: W (2024)
Medal record
Representing Czech Republic
Olympic Games
| Gold medal – first place | 2024 Paris | Mixed Doubles |
- Last updated on: 16 November 2026.

Tomáš Macháč (Czech pronunciation: [ˈtomaːʃ ˈmaxaːtʃ]; born 13 October 2000) is a Czech professional tennis player. He has a career-high ATP singles ranking of world No. 20 achieved on 3 March 2025 and a best doubles ranking of No. 46 reached on 30 September 2024. He is currently the No. 3 Czech player in men's singles.

His biggest achievement is a gold medal in mixed doubles at the 2024 Paris Olympics, with Kateřina Siniaková. He has won three ATP Tour titles, two in singles and one in doubles.

Macháč represents the Czech Republic at the Davis Cup.

== Early life and background ==
Macháč was born in Beroun, in the Czech region of Central Bohemia. He took up tennis after watching his older sister, Kateřina, compete in tournaments.

Macháč began training at TK Sparta Prague in Prague from the age of eight.

== Junior career ==
Macháč had mixed results on the ITF junior circuit, maintaining a 60–43 singles win-loss record. In 2017, he won the prestigious Orange Bowl in doubles, with compatriot Ondřej Štyler.

He reached an ITF junior combined ranking of No. 16 on 1 January 2018.

== Professional career ==
=== 2021: First major win, Olympics debut ===
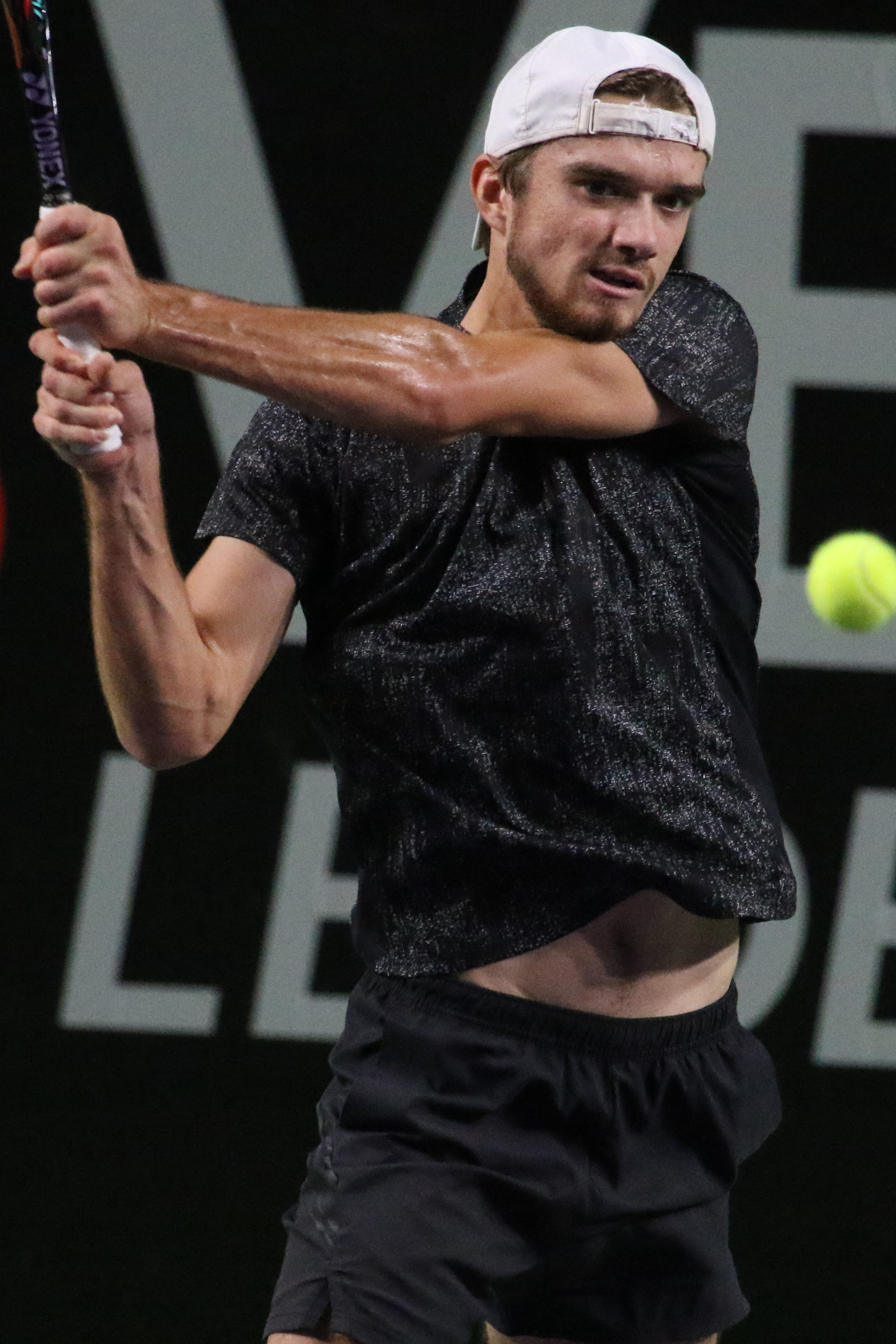
Macháč at the 2021 Internationaux de Tennis de Vendée

In March, Macháč won his second ATP Challenger singles title at the 2021 Nur-Sultan Challenger II.

In August, he reached his second Challenger final of 2021 at the Svijany Open where he lost to Alex Molčan in 58 minutes.

=== 2022: Masters debut in Indian Wells & first win, top 100 ===
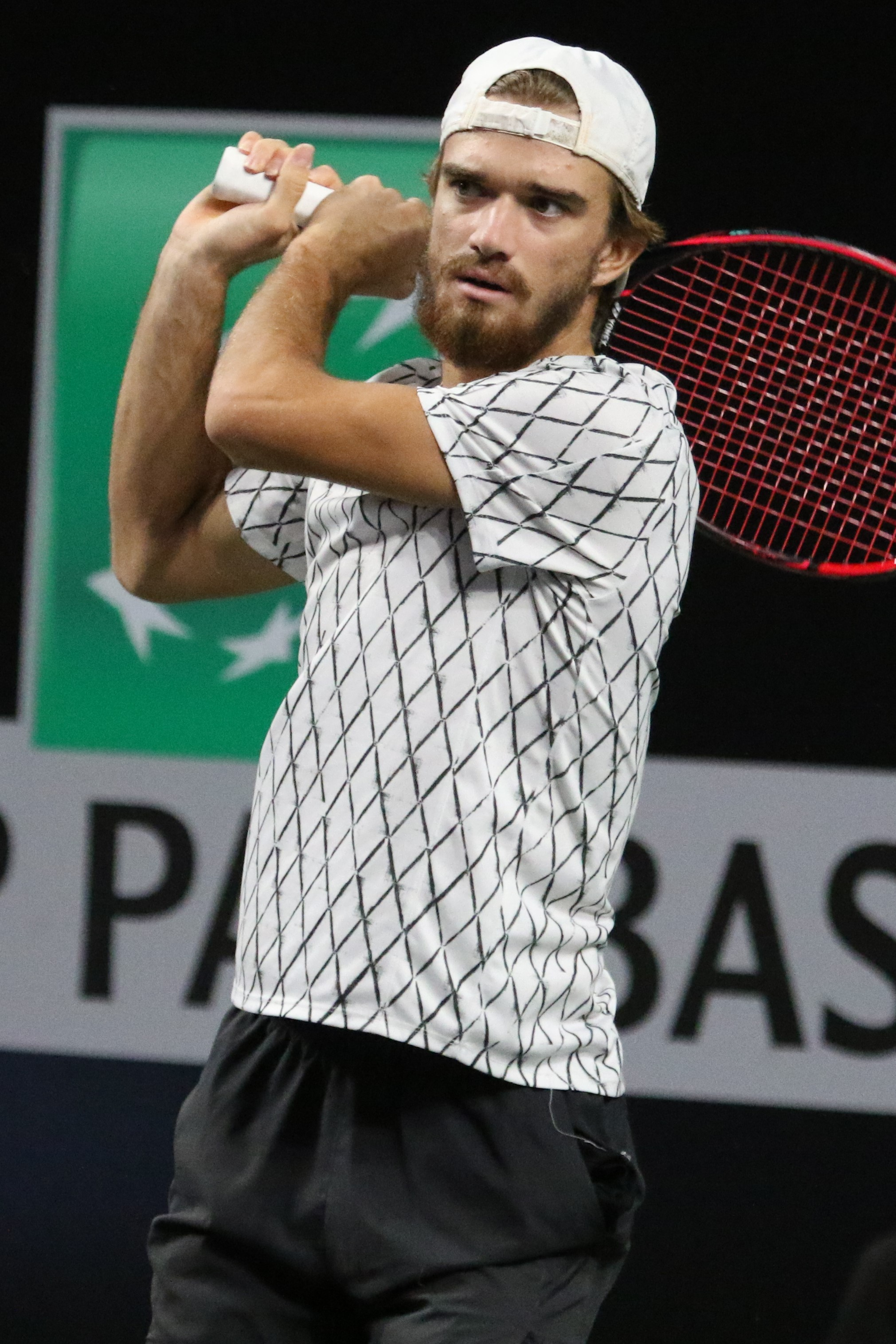
Macháč at the 2022 Internationaux de Tennis de Vendée

Macháč made the final of the Traralgon Challenger and won, earning his first Challenger title on an outdoor hardcourt. As a result, he entered the top 130 on 10 January 2022. The following week he qualified for the 2022 Australian Open main draw, defeating Camilo Ugo Carabelli, Yuki Bhambri, and Jesper de Jong en route.

In March, he made his Masters 1000 debut as a qualifier at the Indian Wells Open and recorded his first win at this level defeating Alexei Popyrin. He lost to world No. 1, Daniil Medvedev.

In August, he won his fourth Challenger title at the 2022 Kozerki Open in Poland and moved 32 positions up to No. 126, on 22 August 2022. In the same month, he qualified for the US Open making his debut at this Grand Slam.

=== 2023: Two ATP quarterfinals & Challenger titles, top 75 ===
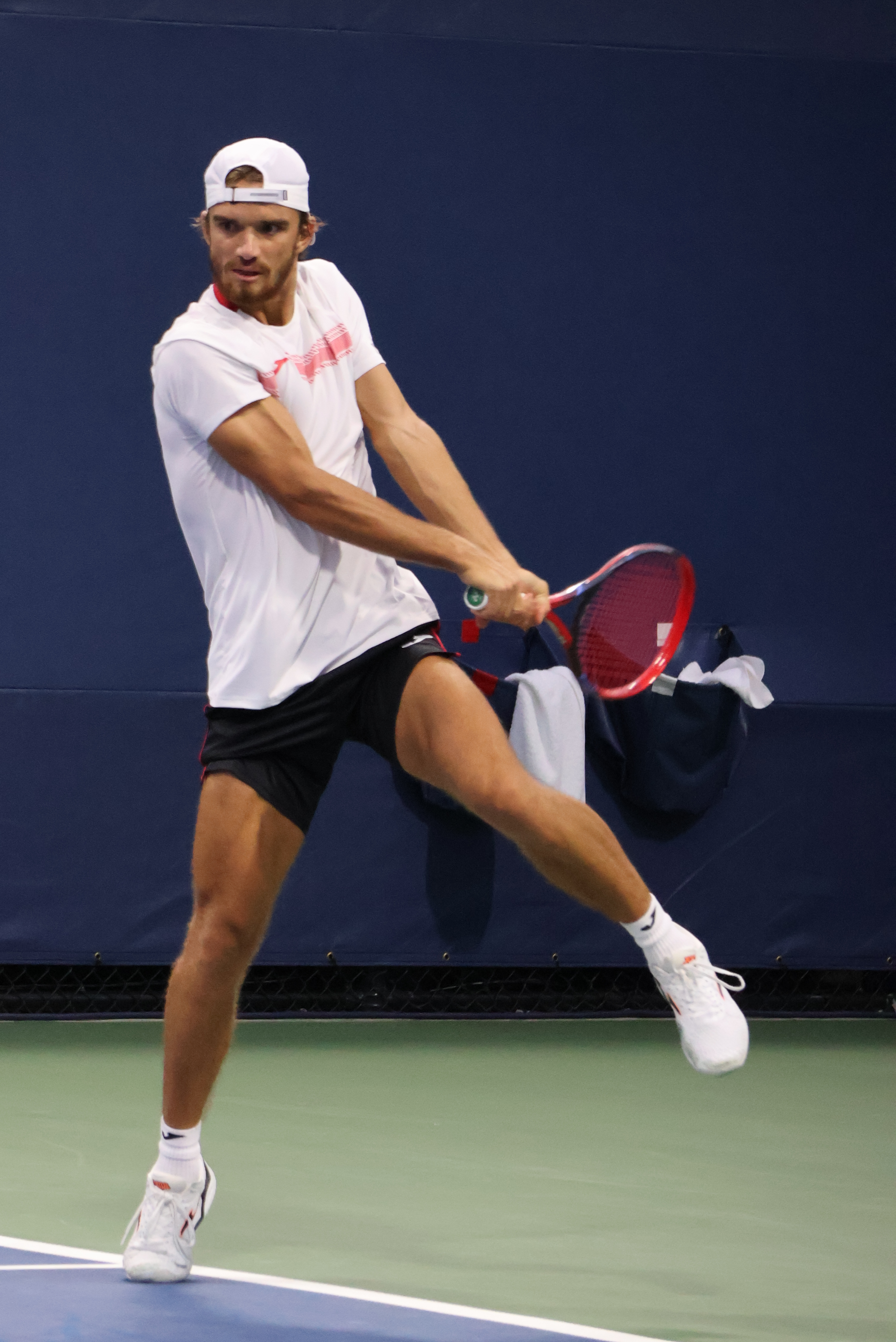
Macháč at the 2023 US Open

In February, Macháč qualified for the Dubai Championships but lost to world No. 1, Novak Djokovic in 3 sets.

At the U.S. Clay Court Championships, he reached his first ATP quarterfinal as a qualifier defeating Jack Sock and seventh seed Marcos Giron. He lost to Yannick Hanfmann.

Macháč won his fifth Challenger title at the 2023 Open d'Orléans in France and returned to the top 100 on 2 October 2023. The following week he won the Challenger 2023 Open de Vendée in Mouilleron-le-Captif, France and reached the top 85. At the Stockholm Open, he entered the main draw as a lucky loser replacing fourth seed Alejandro Davidovich Fokina directly into the second round. He defeated Stan Wawrinka to reach his second ATP quarterfinal. As a result, he reached the top 75 on 23 October 2023.

=== 2024-2025: Olympics mixed gold, ATP title, Czech No. 1, top 20 ===
In January, Macháč qualified for the 2024 Brisbane International and defeated seventh seed Tomás Martín Etcheverry for his first ATP win of the season. He also recorded wins at the 2024 Australian Open over lucky loser Shintaro Mochizuki and 17th seed Frances Tiafoe, for his first top-20 and biggest win of his career, to reach the third round of a Major for the first time. In doubles, on his debut, he reached the quarterfinals with Zhang Zhizhen, having never won a doubles Major match before, taking out the 2020 champions and third seeds Rajeev Ram and Joe Salisbury. Next he reached the semifinals defeating Ariel Behar and Adam Pavlásek.

For his first top 10 win at the 2024 Miami Open, Macháč reached the third round of a Masters 1000 for the first time, defeating ATP debutant local wildcard Darwin Blanch, and Andrey Rublev. Macháč defeated Andy Murray in a three and a half hours match to reach the fourth round of a Masters for the first time in his career. He went one step further to reach his first Masters 1000 quarterfinal having never been past the second round at this level, defeating Matteo Arnaldi, and reached the top 50 in the rankings on 1 April 2024 at world No. 43.

Macháč reached his first ATP semifinal at the 2024 Geneva Open with a win over Alex Michelsen. In the semifinals, Macháč defeated world No. 1 Novak Djokovic to reach his first ATP Tour-level singles final. Macháč lost to second seed and two-time Geneva champion Casper Ruud in straight sets. As a result, he reached the top 35 in the rankings on 27 May 2024.

At the 2024 Paris Olympics, Macháč won the gold medal in the mixed doubles with his doubles partner Kateřina Siniaková. At the same tournament, he also reached the bronze medal semifinals stage in Men's doubles with Adam Pavlásek but lost to Americans Taylor Fritz and Tommy Paul.

At the US Open, he reached the third round for the first time at this Grand Slam, and for the third time in a Major during the season, defeating Fabio Fognini and upsetting 16th seed Sebastian Korda both in straight sets. He defeated David Goffin to reach the fourth round for the first time in his career. At the 2024 Japan Open, he reached his second ATP semifinal in his career, defeating Alexei Popyrin, fifth seed Tommy Paul and Alex Michelsen. At the 2024 Shanghai Masters, he reached his first ATP Masters 1000 semifinal upsetting en route 11th seed Tommy Paul and World No. 2 Carlos Alcaraz, his second win over a Top 5 opponent (after Djokovic in Geneva SF). As a result, he reached the top 25 in the singles rankings and became the Czech No. 1 player.

Macháč reached the top 20 in the singles rankings on 3 March 2025 following winning his first ATP title and first at the 500-level at the Mexican Open defeating Alejandro Davidovich Fokina in the final.

== Personal life ==
Macháč dated fellow Czech tennis player Kateřina Siniaková. In July 2024, Siniaková confirmed they broke up.

== Performance timelines ==
Key
| W | F | SF | QF | #R | RR | Q# | DNQ | A | NH |

(W) winner; (F) finalist; (SF) semifinalist; (QF) quarterfinalist; (#R) rounds 4, 3, 2, 1; (RR) round-robin stage; (Q#) qualification round; (DNQ) did not qualify; (A) absent; (NH) not held; (SR) strike rate (events won / competed); (W–L) win–loss record.
To avoid confusion and double counting, these charts are updated at the conclusion of a tournament or when the player's participation has ended.

=== Singles ===
| Tournament | 2020 | 2021 | 2022 | 2023 | 2024 | 2025 | 2026 | SR | W–L | Win % |
|---|---|---|---|---|---|---|---|---|---|---|
Grand Slam tournaments
| Australian Open | A | 2R | 2R | 1R | 3R | 3R | 3R | 0 / 6 | 8–6 | 57% |
| French Open | 1R | Q1 | A | Q1 | 3R | 1R | 2R | 0 / 4 | 3–4 | 43% |
| Wimbledon | NH | Q3 | A | 1R | 2R | 2R | A | 0 / 3 | 2–3 | 40% |
| US Open | A | Q1 | 1R | Q3 | 4R | 4R | 1R | 0 / 4 | 6–4 | 60% |
| Win–loss | 0–1 | 1–1 | 1–2 | 0–2 | 8–4 | 6–4 | 3–3 | 0 / 17 | 19–17 | 53% |
National representation
| Summer Olympics | NH | A | Not Held | | 2R | Not Held | | 0 / 1 | 1–1 | 50% |
ATP Masters 1000
| Indian Wells Open | NH | A | 2R | A | 2R | 2R | A | 0 / 3 | 2–3 | 40% |
| Miami Open | NH | A | Q1 | Q2 | QF | 4R (Note: Withdrew during the tournament. Not counted as a loss.) | 2R | 0 / 3 | 7–2 | 70% |
| Monte-Carlo Masters | NH | A | A | A | A | 2R | 3R | 0 / 2 | 3–2 | 60% |
| Madrid Open | NH | A | A | A | 2R | 2R | 2R | 0 / 3 | 2–3 | 40% |
| Italian Open | A | A | A | Q1 | A | 3R | 2R | 0 / 2 | 2–1 | 67% |
| Canadian Open | NH | A | A | A | 1R | 2R | A | 0 / 2 | 0–2 | 0% |
| Cincinnati Open | A | A | A | A | 1R | 2R | 1R | 0 / 3 | 0–3 | 0% |
| Shanghai Masters | Not Held | | | A | SF | 3R | 2R | 0 / 3 | 6–3 | 67% |
| Paris Masters | A | A | A | A | 1R | 1R | 2R | 0 / 3 | 1–3 | 25% |
| Win–loss | 0–0 | 0–0 | 1–1 | 0–0 | 10–7 | 5–8 | 7–6 | 0 / 24 | 23–22 | 51% |
Career statistics
| | 2020 | 2021 | 2022 | 2023 | 2024 | 2025 | 2026 | SR | W–L | Win % |
| Tournaments | 1 | 3 | 4 | 7 | 22 | 19 | 15 | Career total: 71 | | |
| Titles | 0 | 0 | 0 | 0 | 0 | 1 | 1 | Career total: 2 | | |
| Finals | 0 | 0 | 0 | 0 | 1 | 1 | 1 | Career total: 3 | | |
| Hardcourt Win–Loss | 0–0 | 4–3 | 4–4 | 5–6 | 23–16 | 18–12 | 8–5 | 2 / 44 | 62–46 | 0% |
| Clay Win–Loss | 0–1 | 0–0 | 0–1 | 3–1 | 9–5 | 2–5 | 6–5 | 0 / 19 | 20–18 | 0% |
| Grass Win–Loss | 0–0 | 0–0 | 0–0 | 0–1 | 1–2 | 3–2 | 0–3 | 0 / 8 | 4–8 | 0% |
| Overall Win–Loss | 0–1 | 4–3 | 4–5 | 8–8 | 33–23 | 23–19 | 14–13 | 2 / 71 | 86–72 | 0% |
| Year-end ranking | 195 | 143 | 97 | 78 | 25 | 32 | | | | |

=== Doubles ===
Current through the 2026 US Open.

| Tournament | 2020 | 2021 | 2022 | 2023 | 2024 | 2025 | 2026 | SR | W–L | Win % |
|---|---|---|---|---|---|---|---|---|---|---|
Grand Slam tournaments
| Australian Open | A | A | A | A | SF | 3R | 1R | 0 / 3 | 6–3 | 57% |
| French Open | A | A | A | A | QF | A | 2R | 0 / 2 | 4–1 | 43% |
| Wimbledon | NH | A | A | A | 2R | 1R | A | 0 / 2 | 1–2 | 40% |
| US Open | A | A | A | A | A | QF | A | 0 / 1 | 3–1 | 60% |
| Win–Loss | 0–0 | 0–0 | 0–0 | 0–0 | 8–3 | 5–3 | 1–1 | 0 / 8 | 14–7 | 53% |
National representation
| Summer Olympics | NH | A | Not Held | | 4th | Not Held | | 0 / 1 | 3–2 | 50% |
ATP 1000 tournaments
| Indian Wells Open | A | NH | A | A | A | 2R | A | 0 / 1 | 1–1 | 60% |
| Miami Open | A | NH | A | A | A | A | A | 0 / 0 | 0–0 | 60% |
| Monte-Carlo Masters | A | NH | A | A | A | 2R | 1R | 0 / 2 | 1–1 | 60% |
| Madrid Open | A | NH | A | A | A | 2R | A | 0 / 1 | 1–1 | 60% |
| Italian Open | A | A | A | A | A | A | A | 0 / 0 | 0–0 | 60% |
| Canadian Open | A | NH | A | A | A | 1R | A | 0 / 1 | 0–1 | 60% |
| Cincinnati Open | A | A | A | A | A | 1R | A | 0 / 1 | 0–1 | 60% |
| Shanghai Masters | Not Held | | | A | 1R | A | | 0 / 1 | 0–1 | 60% |
| Paris Masters | A | A | A | A | A | 1R | | 0 / 1 | 0–1 | 60% |
| Win–Loss | 0–0 | 0–0 | 0–0 | 0–0 | 0–1 | 3–5 | 0–1 | 0 / 8 | 3–7 | 60% |
Career statistics
| | 2020 | 2021 | 2022 | 2023 | 2024 | 2025 | 2026 | SR | W–L | Win % |
| Tournaments | 0 | 0 | 0 | 0 | 12 | 12 | 7 | Career total: 31 | | |
| Titles | 0 | 0 | 0 | 0 | 1 | 0 | 0 | Career total: 1 | | |
| Finals | 0 | 0 | 0 | 0 | 1 | 0 | 0 | Career total: 1 | | |
| Hardcourt Win–Loss | 0–0 | 0–2 | 0–1 | 1–0 | 11–3 | 8–10 | 5–3 | 1 / 17 | 25–19 | 60% |
| Clay Win–Loss | 0–0 | 0–0 | 0–1 | 0–1 | 8–6 | 2–1 | 2–2 | 0 / 10 | 12–11 | 60% |
| Grass Win–Loss | 0–0 | 0–0 | 0–0 | 0–0 | 1–2 | 0–2 | 0–0 | 0 / 4 | 1–4 | 60% |
| Overall Win–Loss | 0–0 | 0–2 | 0–2 | 1–1 | 20–11 | 10–13 | 7–5 | 1 / 31 | 38–34 | 60% |
| Year-end ranking | | 474 | 1257 | n/a | 50 | 118 | | | | |

== Significant finals ==
=== Summer Olympics ===
==== Doubles: 1 (4th place) ====
| Result | Year | Tournament | Surface | Partner | Opponents | Score |
|---|---|---|---|---|---|---|
| 4th place | 2024 | Summer Olympics, France | Clay | (Czech Republic) Adam Pavlásek | (United States) Taylor Fritz (United States) Tommy Paul | 3–6, 4–6 |

==== Mixed doubles: 1 (gold medal) ====
| Result | Year | Tournament | Surface | Partner | Opponents | Score |
|---|---|---|---|---|---|---|
| Gold | 2024 | Summer Olympics, France | Clay | (Czech Republic) Kateřina Siniaková | (China) Wang Xinyu (China) Zhang Zhizhen | 6–2, 5–7, [10–8] |

== ATP Tour finals ==
=== Singles: 3 (2 titles, 1 runner-up) ===
| Legend ATP 500 (1–0) ATP 250 (1–1) | Finals by surface Hard (2–0) Clay (0–1) | Finals by setting Outdoor (2–1) |

| Result | W–L | Date | Tournament | Tier | Surface | Opponents | Score |
|---|---|---|---|---|---|---|---|
| Loss | 0–1 | May 2024 | Geneva Open, Switzerland | ATP 250 | Clay | (Norway) Casper Ruud | 5–7, 3–6 |
| Win | 1–1 | Feb 2025 | Mexican Open, Mexico | ATP 500 | Hard | (Spain) Alejandro Davidovich Fokina | 7–6^{(8–6)}, 6–2 |
| Win | 2–1 | Jan 2026 | Adelaide International, Australia | ATP 250 | Hard | (France) Ugo Humbert | 6–4, 6–7^{(2–7)}, 6–2 |

=== Doubles: 1 (title) ===
| Legend ATP 250 (1–0) | Finals by surface Hard (1–0) | Finals by setting Indoor (1–0) |

| Result | Date | Tournament | Tier | Surface | Partner | Opponents | Score |
|---|---|---|---|---|---|---|---|
| Win | Feb 2024 | Open 13, France | ATP 250 | Hard (i) | (China) Zhang Zhizhen | (Finland) Patrik Niklas-Salminen (Finland) Emil Ruusuvuori | 6–3, 6–4 |

== ATP Challenger Tour finals ==
=== Singles: 11 (6 titles, 5 runner–ups) ===
| Legend ATP Challenger (6–5) | Finals by surface Hard (6–3) Clay (0–2) |

| Result | W–L | Date | Tournament | Surface | Opponent | Score |
|---|---|---|---|---|---|---|
| Win | 1–0 | Feb 2020 | Koblenz Open, Germany | Hard (i) | (Netherlands) Botic van de Zandschulp | 6–3, 4–6, 6–3 |
| Loss | 1–1 | Nov 2020 | Slovak Open, Slovakia | Hard (i) | (Germany) Maximilian Marterer | 7–6^{(7–3)}, 2–6, 5–7 |
| Win | 2–1 | Mar 2021 | Nur-Sultan Challenger, Kazakhstan | Hard (i) | (Austria) Sebastian Ofner | 4–6, 6–4, 6–4 |
| Loss | 2–2 | Aug 2021 | Svijany Open, Czech Republic | Clay | (Slovakia) Alex Molčan | 0–6, 1–6 |
| Win | 3–2 | Jan 2022 | Traralgon International, Australia | Hard | (United States) Bjorn Fratangelo | 7–6^{(7–2)}, 6–3 |
| Win | 4–2 | Aug 2022 | Kozerki Open, Poland | Hard | (China) Zhang Zhizhen | 1–6, 6–3, 6–2 |
| Loss | 4–3 | Nov 2022 | HPP Open, Finland | Hard (i) | (Switzerland) Leandro Riedi | 3–6, 1–6 |
| Loss | 4–4 | Jun 2023 | Czech Open, Czech Republic | Clay | (Czech Republic) Dalibor Svrčina | 4–6, 2–6 |
| Loss | 4–5 | Sep 2023 | Cassis Open, France | Hard | (Italy) Mattia Bellucci | 3–6, 4–6 |
| Win | 5–5 | Oct 2023 | Orléans Open, France | Hard (i) | (United Kingdom) Jack Draper | 6–4, 4–6, 6–3 |
| Win | 6–5 | Oct 2023 | Open de Vendée, France | Hard (i) | (United Kingdom) Arthur Fery | 6–3, 6–4 |

=== Doubles: 2 (2 runner–ups) ===
| Legend ATP Challenger (0–2) |

| Result | W–L | Date | Tournament | Surface | Partner | Opponents | Score |
|---|---|---|---|---|---|---|---|
| Loss | 0–1 | Sep 2021 | Open de Rennes, France | Hard (i) | (Czech Republic) Marek Gengel | (Netherlands) Bart Stevens (Netherlands) Tim van Rijthoven | 7–6^{(7–2)}, 5–7, [3–10] |
| Loss | 0–2 | Oct 2021 | Wolffkran Open, Germany | Carpet (i) | (Czech Republic) Marek Gengel | (Germany) Andre Begemann (Slovakia) Igor Zelenay | 2–6, 4–6 |

== ITF World Tennis Tour finals ==
=== Singles: 4 (4 titles) ===
| Legend 15K / M15 tournaments (4–0) | Finals by surface Hard (3–0) Carpet (1–0) |

| Result | W–L | Date | Tournament | Surface | Opponent | Score |
|---|---|---|---|---|---|---|
| Win | 1–0 | Nov 2018 | F8 Opava, Czech Republic | Carpet (i) | (Czech Republic) Filip Duda | 7–6^{(8–6)}, 7–5 |
| Win | 2–0 | Nov 2018 | F10 Milovice, Czech Republic | Hard (i) | (Germany) Christoph Negritu | 6–2, 6–2 |
| Win | 3–0 | Nov 2018 | F11 Říčany, Czech Republic | Hard (i) | (Czech Republic) Jiří Lehečka | walkover |
| Win | 4–0 | Mar 2019 | M15 Manama, Bahrain | Hard | (Netherlands) Tim van Rijthoven | 6–3, 6–3 |

=== Doubles: 4 (4 runner–ups) ===
| Legend 15K / M15 tournaments (0–4) | Finals by surface Hard (0–1) Clay (0–3) |

| Result | W–L | Date | Tournament | Surface | Partner | Opponents | Score |
|---|---|---|---|---|---|---|---|
| Loss | 0–1 | Jun 2018 | F3 Most, Czech Republic | Clay | (Czech Republic) Michael Vrbenský | (Czech Republic) Petr Michnev (Czech Republic) Patrik Rikl | 2–6, 6–2, [7–10] |
| Loss | 0–2 | Jul 2018 | F5 Ústí nad Orlicí, Czech Republic | Clay | (Czech Republic) Antonín Bolardt | (Czech Republic) Patrik Rikl (Slovakia) Filip Polášek | 6–7^{(2–7)}, 6–7^{(5–7)} |
| Loss | 0–3 | Jan 2019 | M15+H Bressuire, France | Hard (i) | (Czech Republic) Michal Konečný | (France) Dan Added (France) Albano Olivetti | 6–7^{(5–7)}, 3–6 |
| Loss | 0–4 | Apr 2019 | M15 Antalya, Turkey | Clay | (Czech Republic) Michal Konečný | (Finland) Patrik Niklas-Salminen (Russia) Bogdan Bobrov | 3–6, 3–6 |

== Wins against Top 10 players ==
- Macháč has a 4–17 (19.05%) record against players who were, at the time the match was played, ranked in the top 10.

| No. | Player | Rk | Event | Surface | Rd | Score | Rk | Years | Ref |
|---|---|---|---|---|---|---|---|---|---|
| 1 | Andrey Rublev | 6 | Miami Open, USA | Hard | 2R | 6–4, 6–4 | 60 | 2024 | |
| 2 | (Serbia) Novak Djokovic | 1 | Geneva Open, Switzerland | Clay | SF | 6–4, 0–6, 6–1 | 44 | 2024 | |
| 3 | (Spain) Carlos Alcaraz | 2 | Shanghai Masters, China | Hard | QF | 7–6^{(7–5)}, 7–5 | 33 | 2024 | |
| 4 | (Bulgaria) Grigor Dimitrov | 9 | Vienna Open, Austria | Hard (i) | 2R | 6–7^{(5–7)}, 6–4, 6–3 | 27 | 2024 | |

- Key: (Rk) first use, opponent rank; (Rd) round; (Rk) 2nd use, player rank; (Ref) reference; (F) final; (SF) semifinal; (QF) quarterfinal; (#R) rounds 4, 3, 2, 1; (RR) round-robin stage; (Q#) qualifying rounds or stages (3), 2, 1.

*As of 29 December 2025
