= Zhang Zhizhen =

Chinese tennis player (born 1996)

Zhang Zhizhen 张之臻
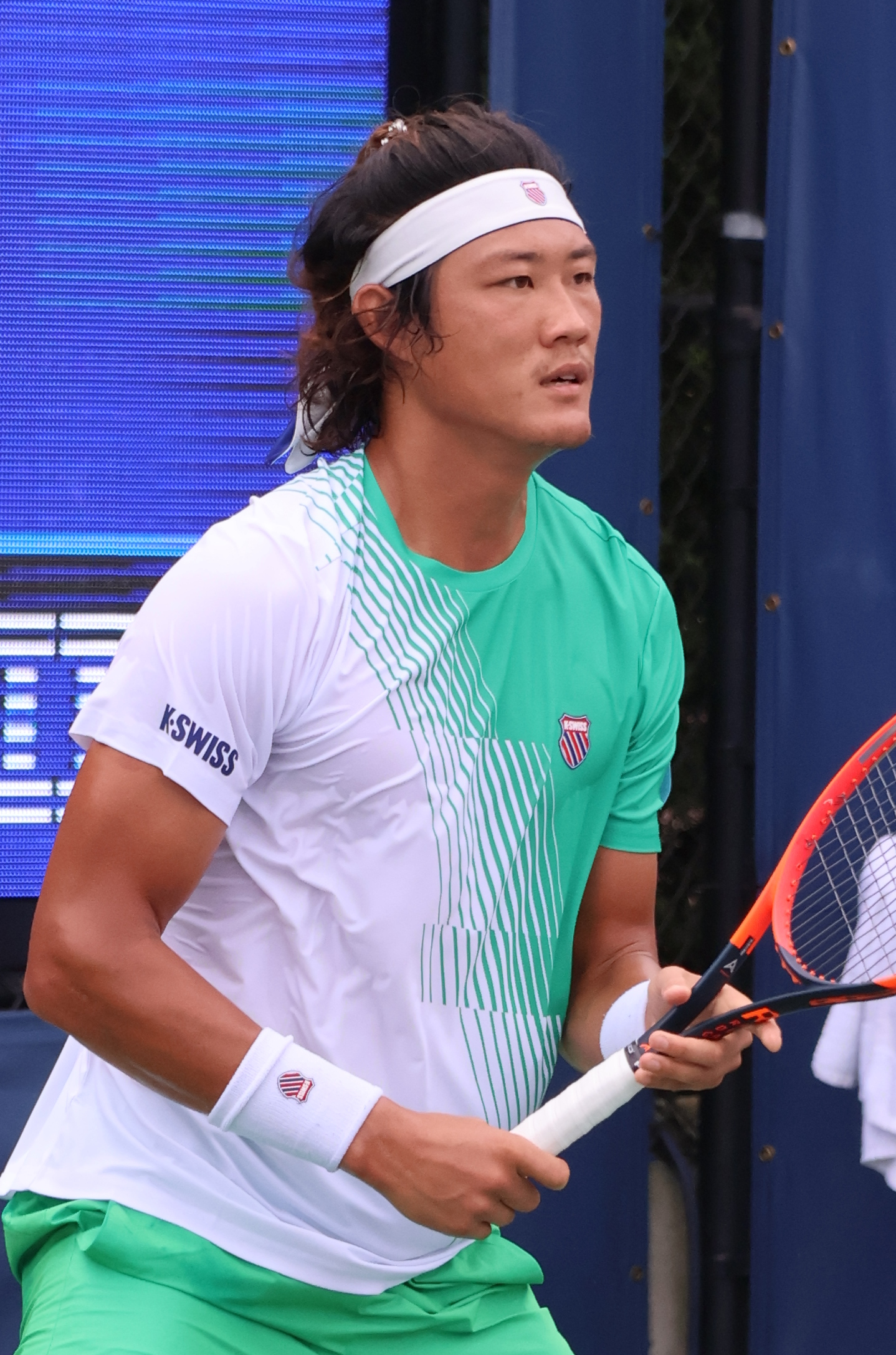
- Zhang at the 2023 US Open
- Country (sports): China
- Born: 16 October 1996 (age 29) Shanghai, China
- Height: 1.93 m (6 ft 4 in)
- Turned pro: 2012
- Plays: Right-handed (two-handed backhand)
- Coach: Lu Yen-hsun, Antonio Veić
- Prize money: US $ 3,799,682

Singles
- Career record: 64–81
- Career titles: 0
- Highest ranking: No. 31 (22 July 2024)
- Current ranking: No. 165 (28 September 2026)

Grand Slam singles results
- Australian Open: 2R (2024)
- French Open: 3R (2023, 2024)
- Wimbledon: 2R (2024)
- US Open: 3R (2023)

Other tournaments
- Olympic Games: 1R (2024)

Doubles
- Career record: 20–21
- Career titles: 1
- Highest ranking: No. 47 (15 July 2024)
- Current ranking: No. 251 (30 June 2025)

Grand Slam doubles results
- Australian Open: SF (2024)
- French Open: QF (2024)
- Wimbledon: 2R (2024)
- US Open: 1R (2023)

Grand Slam mixed doubles results
- Australian Open: 1R (2023, 2025)

Other mixed doubles tournaments
- Olympic Games: F (2024)

Team competitions
- Davis Cup: 2–0
Medal record
Men's tennis
Representing China
Olympic Games
Silver medal – second place	2024 Paris	Mixed
Asian Games
Gold medal – first place	2022 Hangzhou	Singles
- Last updated on: 23 February 2026.

Zhang Zhizhen (simplified Chinese: 张之臻; traditional Chinese: 張之臻; pinyin: Zhāng Zhīzhēn; Mandarin pronunciation: [ʈʂáŋ ʈʂɻ̩́ ʈʂə́n]; born 16 October 1996) is a Chinese professional tennis player. He reached a career-high ATP singles ranking of world No. 31 in July 2024 and a doubles ranking of No. 47 in July 2024. As of July 2023, he became the highest-ever ranked Chinese male tennis player. He is the current No. 3 Chinese player. He has won three singles and two doubles titles on the ATP Challenger, and two singles and two doubles titles on the ITF Futures Tour. He won a silver medal in mixed doubles alongside Wang Xinyu at the 2024 Summer Olympics.

In 2021, Zhang became the first Chinese man in the Open Era to play in the main draw at Wimbledon. In October 2022, he became the first Chinese male player to reach the top 100 in the ATP singles rankings. Then, in 2023 in Madrid, he became the first Chinese man to reach an ATP Tour Masters 1000 quarterfinal.

== Early life ==
In 1996, Zhang was born to a sports family in Shanghai. His father Zhang Weihua (张卫华) played football in the Chinese Jia-A League as a defender for Shanghai Shenhua. His mother was a member of the Shanghai shooting sports team and later worked at the Shanghai bureau of China Telecom. From age 4 to age 6, he had two weekly swimming classes at kindergarten, and his parents enrolled him to tennis lessons in the weekends. When he reached elementary school, his parents let him decide which one of the two sports to continue. He chose tennis because the swimming teachers were strict, partly because of their responsibility of ensuring swimming safety. From 2008 to 2013, he was coached by Shao Donglu (邵东路).

In December 2015, he fractured a bone in his left foot after stepping into a pit during a sprinting exercise in a park. He underwent surgery two months later, and his form dropped significantly until May 2017. In 2016, Zhang signed with the Croatian tennis agent Ivan Ljubicic. Since then, Zhang's main residence moved to Lošinj Island, Croatia. In June 2022, he graduated with a degree of human resources management from Shanghai Jiao Tong University.

Zhang is married and has one child.

== Career ==
=== 2012–2014: ITF debut ===
Zhizhen Zhang began his career in Chico, California, playing on the ITF Futures Tour. Despite losing to Jason Jung in straight sets, Zhang rebounded at the Joplin Futures tournament, recording his first win as a professional against Daniel Yoo, before losing in straight sets to unranked American Gonzales Austin. Zhang lost in the first round of the following two futures tournaments he entered. At the 2012 Shanghai Rolex Masters, Zhang – only sixteen at the time – was given a wild card entry into the qualifying draw; he lost to world number sixty one Brian Baker, winning just three games in his debut clash with a top one hundred ATP player.

After a six month hiatus from professional events, Zhang made his 2013 ITF Men's Circuit debut in May at the USA F12 challenger, where Greg Ouellette got the better of the youngster in three sets. Zhang continued to play professional events sporadically, managing to come through qualifying to make the 2013 Shanghai Challenger's main draw – his first ATP Challenger Tour appearance. Zhang would skip half of the 2014 ITF Men's Circuit, finishing the year with only thirteen participations in senior-level events, including a quarterfinal showing at a Futures tournament in Cyprus.

=== 2015: ATP debut ===
March brought Zhang his first victories of 2015, where he bested Jan Zieliński and top-400 player Bastian Trinker in Turkey's 11th Futures event of the year. Zhang struggled to maintain consistent form in the following months, exiting in the opening two rounds of every tournament he played in, before winning the Mont-de-Marsan Futures tournament in June; this was Zhang's first ITF World Tennis Tour title. French tournaments continued being the bearers of good results for Zhang, as he followed his Futures title with a second final three weeks later, this time in Bourg-en-Bresse.

His ranking bolstered by positive results on the 2015 ITF Men's Circuit, Zhang began entering tournaments on the 2015 ATP Challenger Tour, though he failed to win any main-draw matches in his first few months on the higher-level Challenger Tour. Zhang then made his ATP tour debut at the 2015 Shenzhen Open. As a qualifier, he defeated Japanese Go Soeda in straight sets in the first round, before losing to sixth-seed Jiří Veselý in straight sets.

Zhang played in the qualifying draws of both the Beijing Open, and the Shanghai Masters, though he failed to breach the main draw of either venue. Zhang rounded out the year with a few early losses in Challenger tournaments.

=== 2016: Loss of form ===
Zhang inexplicably missed the first four months of the 2016 ATP World Tour, and when he did arrive, he returned on the 2016 ITF Men's Circuit. Zhang lost early through much of April and May, though he did manage to play in both a 2016 ATP Challenger Tour event, and the qualifying draw of the ATP Tour 250 tournament in Nice, the Open de Nice where he lost a third set tiebreaker to future world No. 1, Daniil Medvedev, in the second round of qualifying.

Excluding one quarterfinal at the Futures level, Zhang lost in the first or second round of every tournament main draw he played in. Zhang finished the year outside the top 800, a drop of four-hundred ranking places from the previous year.

=== 2017: Two Futures titles, ATP Tour quarterfinal ===
Zhang's ranking hovered 800 from September, 2016, to May 2017, when the Chinese youngster, still only twenty years old, reached a third Futures final, this time in Lu'an, China. Zhang lost in the final to American Alexander Sarkissian. Now ranked just outside of the top-700, Zhang continued his ascent, winning the Shenzhen Futures tournament, and losing in the finals of another futures tournament in China (the Yinchuan Futures tournament) two weeks later. Zhang then began competing on the 2017 ATP Challenger Tour, and for the first time, he had no need to play qualifying draws to enter said Challenger Tour events.

After a couple months of early losses on the Challenger Tour, Zhang rebounded at the 2017 Shenzhen Open. As a qualifier, Zhang upset 4th seed and world No. 39 Paolo Lorenzi in the second round, subsequently losing to Henri Laaksonen in the last eight. On the 26th of November, 2017, after defeating Te Rigele in a three-set final, Zhang won the China Tennis Grand Prix Cup title for the first time. With his newfound success at both the Futures and Tour Levels, Zhang finished 2017 ranked in the top 350.

=== 2018: ATP Challenger semifinal ===
Zhang spent the first half of 2018 losing early on both the 2018 ATP Challenger Tour and the 2018 ITF Men's Circuit. Zhang reached a sixth futures final, losing to Jelle Sels in Casina. Zhang's surge in form continued, with a semifinal appearance at the 2018 Jinan International Open. Zhang then lost to Andy Murray in Shenzhen, retiring due to injury halfway through the third set. Zhang recovered in time for both the 2018 China Open, and the 2018 Shanghai Rolex Masters, although he failed to win matches in either.

=== 2019: Two Challenger titles, China's No. 1 player, top 150 debut ===
Zhang started his 2019 season with back-to-back quarterfinal showings on the 2019 ITF Men's World Tennis Tour. Zhang then transitioned to the 2019 ATP Challenger Tour, where he reached the round of sixteen in Anning, followed by a quarterfinal loss to Ramkumar Ramanathan at the 2019 ATP Challenger China International – Nanchang. Zhang lost early in his next three challenger tournaments. June's Columbus Challenger saw Zhang return to the later rounds, with another quarterfinal defeat. Zhang's fifth quarterfinal (including both the Futures and Challenger tours' tournaments) was also a defeat; he fell to Bai Yan at the 2019 Chengdu Challenger.

The fall hard-court swing saw Zhang's best results to date. He won the 2019 Jinan International Open, beating top one-hundred player Soonwoo Kwon en route. He also reached the second round of both the 2019 Zhuhai Championships and the 2019 China Open, with the latter being a loss to top-five player and eventual champion Dominic Thiem.

October handed Zhang his ATP Tour Masters 1000 main draw debut: a defeat to Hubert Hurkacz at the 2019 Rolex Shanghai Masters. Zhang concluded October with a second Challenger crown, ousting Li Zhe in the final round of the 2019 Shenzhen Longhua Open.

Zhang finished 2019 ranked 138. A career high year-end ranking.

=== 2020–2021: Historic Wimbledon debut ===
Zhang skipped most of the already abridged 2020 ATP Tour season. He played and lost in the first round of the 2020 Tata Open Maharashtra, and failed to progress past qualifying at the 2020 Dubai Tennis Championships. After the onset of the Coronavirus pandemic, Zhang did not play again until the following year.

Zhang started his 2021 year with a first-round loss at the 2021 İstanbul Challenger, and a second round loss in Dubai, ending his hopes of qualifying for the 2021 Australian Open (the qualifiers were held in Dubai due to coronavirus restrictions and concerns). Grinding through the 2021 ATP Challenger Tour with few victories, Zhang's drought ended with a semifinal placing at the Biella Challenger Indoor. Zhang fell short of qualifying for the 2021 French Open, thus concluding his clay season.

After playing (and losing in the second round) at the 2021 Nottingham Trophy, Zhang qualified for a Grand Slam main draw at the 2021 Wimbledon Championships; his first appearance in a main draw at a Major level. He became the first male Chinese in the Open Era to qualify at Wimbledon. He was also only the fourth Chinese man to play singles in the main draw of any Grand Slam since 1968, with the others being Wu Di at the Australian Open in 2013, 2014 and 2016, Zhang Ze at the Australian Open in 2014 and 2015, and Li Zhe at the 2019 Australian Open.

Zhang's 2021 season abruptly ended with an injury obtained against Federico Delbonis in Hamburg. Zhang finished the year outside the top three-hundred, despite peaking just outside of the top-one-hundred in the ATP rankings earlier in the season.

=== 2022: US Open debut, second ATP quarterfinal and historic top 100 ===
The San Luis Potosi Challenger in April was Zhang's first quarterfinal appearance at any level in 2022. Having lost early or in qualifying for many previous events on the 2022 ATP Challenger Tour, Zhang finally managed to progress beyond the second round at a tournament for the first time in almost a year. The following week in Florida, at the 2022 Tallahassee Tennis Challenger, Zhang made it to the last four, losing to Wu Tung-lin in two close sets. Zhang then made a Challenger quarterfinal for the third week in a row, losing to former top-ten player and 2017 Rolex Paris Masters champion Jack Sock in the final eight. A couple weeks later, and Zhang would again find himself in a Challenger semifinal, this time at the 2022 Tunis Open.

Zhang failed to reach the Wimbledon Championships' main draw again, losing in the second round of qualifying to Daniel Masur. Zhang returned to the Challenger tour after his loss to Masur, opting to play the 2022 Platzmann-Sauerland Open. He reached the final without dropping a set, eliminating both third-seeded Manuel Guinard and seventh-seeded Pablo Cuevas en route. Eighteen year-old Serbian Hamad Medjedovic downed Zhang in less than an hour. This was Zhang's first appearance in a challenger final since 2019. Zhang next travelled to Braunschweig with a special exemption entry into the Brawo Open. Zhang would reach the semifinals in Braunschweig, defeating world No. 51, Pedro Martínez, and 2018 French Open semifinalist Marco Cecchinato. Maximilian Marterer bested Zhang in a three-set match to reach the final, despite Zhang holding numerous match points.

Zhang entered the 2022 Internazionali di Tennis Città di Trieste Challenger as a qualifier, defeating fifth-seeded Marco Cecchinato and eighth-seeded Alexandre Müller en route to the final, where he lost to Francesco Passaro despite clinching the first set. Zhang re-entered the top-200 for the first time since he injured himself at the 2021 Hamburg European Open. Zhang reached a second straight Challenger Tour final at the 2022 Internazionali di Tennis del Friuli Venezia Giulia in Cordenons, Italy upsetting fourth seed Pavel Kotov in the first round, and Alexandre Müller in the semifinals to reach the final. It was Zhang's third Challenger final in one month, and the fifth of his career. He rallied after losing the first set against Andrea Vavassori, defeating the home-crowd favorite in three sets to lift the title – Zhang's first Challenger title in nearly three years. Zhang rose to world No. 157 in the ATP rankings following Cordenons, his highest ranking in two and a half years.

At his first hardcourt tournament in Poland since June, Zhang reached the final defeating former junior number one Harold Mayot in the semifinals, as well as ATP Tour champion Robin Haase in the final eight. He lost to fifth seed Tomáš Macháč in the final, despite winning the first set, six games to one. Zhang’s run elevated his ranking to No. 138, placing him within two spots of his career-high ranking.

He made his debut at the US Open, qualifying for the main draw alongside his friend Yibing Wu, making history for his country. He narrowly missed being the first Chinese male national to win a major main-draw match in 63 years after losing to Tim van Rijthoven, failing to convert seven match points in the third set.

At the 2022 Astana Open he qualified into the main draw and defeated Aslan Karatsev for his second ATP 500-level win. He lost to fifth seed Andrey Rublev in the second round. As a result he reached a new career-high ranking of No. 110 on 10 October 2022. After qualifying for Naples, Zhang beat Márton Fucsovics and sixth seed Sebastián Báez in straight sets to reach his first ATP Tour-level quarterfinal for the season and first since 2017. As a result, he became the first Chinese male player in the Open era to reach the top 100.

=== 2023: First Major, Masters wins and historic singles quarterfinal, top 5 win, first ATP semifinal ===
At the 2023 Mutua Madrid Open he got his first Masters win over qualifier Jurij Rodionov. He then defeated 21st seed Denis Shapovalov for his first top 30 win, to reach the third round of a Masters for the first time in his career. Next he defeated world No. 13 and eleventh seed Cameron Norrie for his first top 20 win to reach a historic fourth round. He saved three match points in his first top 10 win over eight seed Taylor Fritz to become the first Chinese man in history to reach the quarterfinals at a Masters tournament. Zhang was just the second Chinese player in history to beat a Top 10 player, after Wu Yibing, who also defeated Fritz earlier in the year. He lost to Aslan Karatsev in the quarterfinals in two sets.

At the French Open, he advanced to the second round of a Grand Slam for the first time, after his first round opponent, Dušan Lajović retired after Zhang took the first set 6-1, and led 4-1 in the second set, becoming the first Chinese man to win at Roland Garros in 86 years. Next he defeated qualifier Thiago Agustín Tirante to reach the third round of this Major for the first time since Kho Sin-Kie in 1937. As a result he moved to a new career high singles ranking in the top 55. He also made his Major debut in doubles as an alternate pair with Victor Vlad Cornea. In Eastbourne, he defeated Lorenzo Sonego in the first round, then Maxime Cressy in a thrilling three set match to advance to the quarterfinals, bringing him up to a career high ranking of No. 52, becoming the highest ever ranked male Chinese tennis player, passing Wu Yibing's record of No. 54. He lost in the quarterfinals to Francisco Cerúndolo. In Hamburg, he reached the quarterfinals of an ATP 500 for the first time in his career defeating Jan Choinski and upsetting World No. 45 Yannick Hanfmann in three sets. He then went on to reach his first ever ATP semifinal, defeating Daniel Altmaier in straight sets. In the semifinals, he lost to Laslo Djere in straight sets.

At the US Open he reached the third round defeating JJ Wolf and fifth seed Casper Ruud in five sets and becoming the first Chinese man to beat a top-5 player.

At the Asian Games in Hangzhou, Zhang, as the top seed, beat Ammar Alhogbani, Muhammad Rifqi Fitriadi, fifth seed Sumit Nagal and 13th seed Khumoyun Sultanov to reach the gold medal match. Despite being down two breaks in both sets, he defeated second seed Yosuke Watanuki in straight sets to claim the gold medal.

At the 2023 Rolex Shanghai Masters he reached the third round, the first Chinese player to do so at his home tournament and to claim back to back wins at the home Masters 1000, defeating Richard Gasquet and 28th seed Tomas Martin Etcheverry. Next he defeated Brandon Nakashima to reach a historic fourth round on home soil.

=== 2024: Historic Major doubles semifinal, Olympics mixed doubles silver, ATP singles final and doubles title ===
He made his debut at the 2024 United Cup as the top ATP player of team China and the highest ranked man from an East Asian country in history. He recorded his first win over Jiří Lehečka.

He also recorded his first win at the 2024 Australian Open over Federico Coria, before losing to 21st seed Ugo Humbert. As a result, he reached a historic top 50 in the singles rankings. In doubles, on his debut, he reached the quarterfinals with Tomáš Macháč taking out the 2020 champions and third seeds, Rajeev Ram and Joe Salisbury. Next he reached the semifinals defeating Ariel Behar and Adam Pavlásek becoming the first Chinese man to reach the last four at a Grand Slam.

On his debut at the Italian Open, he reached his second clay Masters quarterfinal and second overall, defeating Daniel Elahi Galán, 19th seed Adrian Mannarino, 12th seed Ben Shelton and qualifier Thiago Monteiro.

Following reaching his second ATP Tour semifinal at the 2024 Halle Open, where he lost to top seed Jannik Sinner, he reached a new career-high at world No. 33 on 24 June 2024.

He won the silver medal with Wang Xinyu in mixed doubles at the 2024 Summer olympics.

At the 2024 Hangzhou Open, he reached his third and an historic all-Chinese semifinal with compatriot Bu Yunchaokete, following wins over Denis Yevseyev, Mattia Bellucci and Roberto Carballés Baena. He defeated Buyunchaokete to reach his first ATP Tour singles final. He was bidding to become only the third Chinese title winner in the Open Era after Wu Yibing, together with Shang Juncheng, who was also a finalist in Chengdu the same day but lost to Marin Čilić the next day.

== Performance timelines ==
Key
W	F	SF	QF	#R	RR	Q#	DNQ	A	NH

(W) winner; (F) finalist; (SF) semifinalist; (QF) quarterfinalist; (#R) rounds 4, 3, 2, 1; (RR) round-robin stage; (Q#) qualification round; (DNQ) did not qualify; (A) absent; (NH) not held; (SR) strike rate (events won / competed); (W–L) win–loss record.
To avoid confusion and double counting, these charts are updated at the conclusion of a tournament or when the player's participation has ended.

=== Singles ===
Current through the 2026 BMW Open.

Tournament	2012	2013	2014	2015	2016	2017	2018	2019	2020	2021	2022	2023	2024	2025	2026	SR	W–L	Win %
Grand Slam tournaments
Australian Open	A	A	A	A	A	A	A	A	Q1	Q2	A	1R	2R	1R	1R	0 / 3	1–4	33%
French Open	A	A	A	A	A	A	A	A	A	Q2	A	3R	3R	A	1R	0 / 3	4–3	57%
Wimbledon	A	A	A	A	A	A	A	A	NH	1R	Q2	1R	2R	A	Q1	0 / 3	1–3	25%
US Open	A	A	A	A	A	A	A	A	A	A	1R	3R	1R	A	A	0 / 3	2–3	40%
Win–loss	0–0	0–0	0–0	0–0	0–0	0–0	0–0	0–0	0–0	0–1	0–1	4–4	4–4	0–1	0–2	0 / 12	8–13	38%
National representation
Summer Olympics	A	NH			A	NH				A	NH		1R	NH		0 / 1	0–1	0%
Davis Cup	A	A	A	A	A	Z1	A	Z1	A		WG2	A	WG2	WG2		0 / 0	5–2	71%
ATP Tour Masters 1000
Indian Wells Open	A	A	A	A	A	A	A	A	NH	A	A	1R	2R	1R	A	0 / 3	1–3	25%
Miami Open	A	A	A	A	A	A	A	A	NH	A	A	Q2	1R	A	1R	0 / 2	0–2	0%
Monte-Carlo Masters	A	A	A	A	A	A	A	A	NH	A	A	A	2R	A	A	0 / 1	1–1	50%
Madrid Open	A	A	A	A	A	A	A	A	NH	A	A	QF	1R	A	1R	0 / 3	4–3	57%
Italian Open	A	A	A	A	A	A	A	A	A	A	A	Q1	QF	A	1R	0 / 2	4–2	67%
Canadian Open	A	A	A	A	A	A	A	A	NH	A	A	1R	A	A		0 / 1	0–1	0%
Cincinnati Open	A	A	A	A	A	A	A	A	A	A	A	Q2	2R	A		0 / 1	1–1	50%
Shanghai Masters	Q1	A	A	Q1	Q1	Q1	Q1	1R	NH			4R	1R	1R		0 / 4	3–4	43%
Paris Masters	A	A	A	A	A	A	A	A	A	A	A	A	1R	A		0 / 1	0–1	0%
Win–loss	0–0	0–0	0–0	0–0	0–0	0–0	0–0	0–1	0–0	0–0	0–0	7–4	7–8	0–2	0–1	0 / 16	14–16	47%
Career statistics
Tournaments	0	0	0	1	0	1	1	3	0	1	4	16	26	10	6	Career total: 69		
Titles	0	0	0	0	0	0	0	0	0	0	0	0	0	0	0	Career total: 0		
Finals	0	0	0	0	0	0	0	0	0	0	0	0	1	0	0	Career total: 1		
Overall win–loss	0–0	0–0	0–0	1–1	0–0	3–1	0–1	2–4	0–0	0–2	5–4	18–16	25–29	5–12	4–7	64–78		
Win percentage	0%	0%	0%	50%	0%	75%	0%	33%	0%	0%	56%	53%	46%	29%	36%	45.07%		
Year-end ranking	1851	1358	1297	413	840	342	360	138	164	321	101	58	45	410		$4,382,441		

=== Doubles ===
Tournament	2015	2023	2024	2025	2026	SR	W–L	Win %
Grand Slam tournaments
Australian Open	A	A	SF	3R	1R	0 / 3	6–3	67%
French Open	A	1R	QF	A		0 / 2	3–2	60%
Wimbledon	A	A	2R	A		0 / 1	1–1	50%
US Open	A	1R	A	A		0 / 1	0–1	0%
Win–loss	0–0	0–2	8–3	2–1	0–1	0 / 7	10–7	59%
ATP Tour Masters 1000
Indian Wells Open	A	A	A	A	A	0 / 0	0–0	–
Miami Open	A	A	A	A		0 / 0	0–0	–
Monte-Carlo Masters	A	A	A	A		0 / 0	0–0	–
Madrid Open	A	A	2R	A		0 / 1	1–1	50%
Italian Open	A	A	A	A		0 / 0	0–0	–
Canadian Open	A	A	A	A		0 / 0	0–0	–
Cincinnati Open	A	A	A	A		0 / 0	0–0	–
Shanghai Masters	1R	A	1R	1R		0 / 3	0–3	0%
Paris Masters	A	A	A	A		0 / 0	0–0	–
Win–loss	0–1	0–0	1–2	0–1	0–0	0 / 4	1–4	20%
Career statistics
Tournaments (Note: Tournaments 2015–2022: 6)	1	3	10	4	1	Career total: 24		
Titles	0	0	1	0	0	Career total: 1		
Finals	0	0	1	0	0	Career total: 1		
Overall win–loss	0–1	1–3	16–10	2–4	1–1	21–24		
Win percentage	0%	25%	62%	33%	50%	47%		
Year-end ranking	706	627	51	361				

== Significant finals ==
=== Summer Olympics ===
==== Mixed doubles: 1 (silver medal) ====
Result	Year	Tournament	Surface	Partner	Opponents	Score
Silver	2024	Summer Olympics, Paris	Clay	(China) Wang Xinyu	(Czech Republic) Kateřina Siniaková (Czech Republic) Tomáš Macháč	2–6, 7–5, [8–10]

== Other significant finals ==
=== Asian Games ===
==== Singles: 1 (gold medal) ====
Result	Year	Tournament	Surface	Opponent	Score
Gold	2022	Asian Games	Hard	(Japan) Yosuke Watanuki	6–4, 7–6^{(9–7)}

== ATP Tour finals ==
=== Singles: 1 (1 runner-up) ===
Legend Grand Slam (0–0) ATP Masters 1000 (0–0) ATP 500 (0–0) ATP 250 (0–1)	Finals by surface Hard (0–1) Clay (0–0) Grass (0–0)	Finals by setting Outdoor (0–1) Indoor (0–0)

Result	W–L	Date	Tournament	Tier	Surface	Opponent	Score
Loss	0–1	Sep 2024	Hangzhou Open, China	ATP 250	Hard	(Croatia) Marin Čilić	6–7^{(5–7)}, 6–7^{(5–7)}

=== Doubles: 1 (1 title) ===
Legend Grand Slam (0–0) ATP Masters 1000 (0–0) ATP 500 (0–0) ATP 250 (1–0)	Finals by surface Hard (1–0) Clay (0–0) Grass (0–0)	Finals by setting Outdoor (0–0) Indoor (1–0)

Result	W–L	Date	Tournament	Tier	Surface	Partner	Opponents	Score
Win	1–0	Feb 2024	Open 13, France	ATP 250	Hard (i)	(Czech Republic) Tomáš Macháč	(Finland) Patrik Niklas-Salminen (Finland) Emil Ruusuvuori	6–3, 6–4

== ATP Challenger Tour finals ==
=== Singles: 4 (7 titles, 3 runner-ups) ===
Legend ATP Challenger Tour (4–3)	Finals by surface Hard (3–1) Clay (1–2) Grass (0–0) Carpet (0–0)

Result	W–L	Date	Tournament	Tier	Surface	Opponent	Score
Win	1–0	Sep 2019	Jinan, China	Challenger	Hard	(Japan) Go Soeda	7–5, 2–6, 6–4
Win	2–0	Nov 2019	Shenzhen, China	Challenger	Hard	(China) Li Zhe	6–3, 4–6, 6–1
Loss	2–1	Jul 2022	Lüdenscheid, Germany	Challenger	Clay	(Serbia) Hamad Međedović	1–6, 2–6
Loss	2–2	Jul 2022	Trieste, Italy	Challenger	Clay	(Italy) Francesco Passaro	6–4, 3–6, 3–6
Win	3–2	Aug 2022	Cordenons, Italy	Challenger	Clay	(Italy) Andrea Vavassori	2–6, 7–6^{(7–5)}, 6–3
Loss	3–3	Aug 2022	Grodzisk Mazowiecki, Poland	Challenger	Hard	(Czech Republic) Tomáš Macháč	6–1, 3–6, 2–6
Win	4–3	Feb 2026	Brisbane, Australia	Challenger	Hard	(Australia) Alex Bolt	6–2, 6–4

=== Doubles: 4 (2 titles, 2 runner-ups) ===
Legend ATP Challenger Tour (2–2)	Finals by surface Hard (2–1) Clay (0–1) Grass (0–0) Carpet (0–0)

Result	W–L	Date	Tournament	Tier	Surface	Partner	Opponents	Score
Win	1–0	Sep 2016	Nanchang, China	Challenger	Hard	(China) Wu Di	(Colombia) Nicolás Barrientos (Philippines) Ruben Gonzales	7–6^{(7–4)}, 6–3
Win	2–0	Sep 2017	Zhangjiagang, China	Challenger	Hard	(China) Gao Xin	(Chinese Taipei) Chen Ti (Chinese Taipei) Yi Chu-huan	6–2, 6–3
Loss	2–1	Sep 2018	Shanghai, China	Challenger	Hard	(China) Hua Runhao	(China) Gong Maoxin (China) Zhang Ze	4–6, 6–3, [4–10]
Loss	2–2	Apr 2022	Savannah, USA	Challenger	Clay (green)	(Chinese Taipei) Wu Tung-lin	(Philippines) Ruben Gonzales (Philippines) Treat Huey	6–7^{(3–7)}, 4–6

== ITF Futures/World Tennis Tour finals ==
=== Singles: 6 (2 titles, 4 runner-ups) ===
Legend ITF Futures (2–4)	Finals by surface Hard (1–2) Clay (1–2) Grass (0–0) Carpet (0–0)

Result	W–L	Date	Tournament	Tier	Surface	Opponent	Score
Win	1–0	Jun 2015	France F10, Mont-de-Marsan	Futures	Clay	(France) Adrien Puget	6–4, 7–6^{(7–4)}
Loss	1–1	Jul 2015	France F13, Bourg-en-Bresse	Futures	Clay	(Spain) Jordi Samper Montaña	3–6, 4–6
Loss	1–2	Jun 2017	China F9, Lu'an	Futures	Hard	(United States) Alexander Sarkissian	2–6, 1–6
Win	2–2	Jul 2017	France F11, Shenzhen	Futures	Hard	(India) Prajnesh Gunneswaran	2–6, 7–5, 5–0 ret.
Loss	2–3	Jul 2017	China F13, Yinchuan	Futures	Hard	(Japan) Sora Fukuda	3–6, 5–7
Loss	2–4	Jul 2018	Italy F18, Casinalbo	Futures	Clay	(Netherlands) Jelle Sels	0–6, 3–6

=== Doubles: 6 (2 titles, 4 runner-ups) ===
Legend ITF Futures/WTT (2–4)	Finals by surface Hard (2–3) Clay (0–1) Grass (0–0) Carpet (0–0)

Result	W–L	Date	Tournament	Tier	Surface	Partner	Opponents	Score
Win	1–0	Jul 2014	China F8, Shenzhen	Futures	Hard	(China) Bai Yan	(China) Hua Runhao (China) Qiu Zhuoyang	6–4, 4–6, [10–3]
Loss	1–1	Jul 2015	France F14, Saint-Gervais-les-Bains	Futures	Clay	(Russia) Daniil Medvedev	(Brazil) Caio Silva (Chile) Ricardo Urzúa-Rivera	6–7^{(4–7)}, 1–6
Loss	1–2	Aug 2015	Belarus F2, Minsk	Futures	Hard	(Russia) Daniil Medvedev	(Belarus) Egor Gerasimov (Belarus) Ilya Ivashka	1–6, 3–6
Win	2–2	Apr 2017	China F5, Luzhou	Futures	Hard	(China) He Yecong	(China) Xia Zihao (Chinese Taipei) Peng Hsien-yin	7–6^{(7–5)}, 6–3
Loss	2–3	Jul 2017	China F10, Kunshan	Futures	Hard	(China) He Yecong	(China) Gao Xin (China) Li Zhe	3–6, 2–6
Loss	2–4	Jan 2019	M15 Monastir, Tunisia	WTT	Hard	(Italy) Jannik Sinner	(Hungary) Gábor Borsos (Hungary) Péter Nagy	1–6, 6–3, [7–10]

== Record against top 10 players ==
- Zhang has a 3–15 record against players who were, at the time the match was played, ranked in the top 10.

Season	2023	2024	2025	2026	Total
Wins	2	1	0	0	3

#	Player	Rk	Event	Surface	Rd	Score	ZZR	Ref
2023
1.	(United States) Taylor Fritz	10	Madrid Open, Spain	Clay	4R	3–6, 7–6^{(7–5)}, 7–6^{(10–8)}	99	
2.	(Norway) Casper Ruud	5	US Open, New York, USA	Hard	2R	6–4, 5–7, 6–2, 0–6, 6–2	67	
2024
3.	Daniil Medvedev	5	Halle Open, Germany	Grass	2R	6–3, 2–6, 7–6^{(7–5)}	42	
