= 2020 Slovak Open – Singles =

Singles
- 2020 Slovak Open

Final
- Champion: (Germany) Maximilian Marterer
- Runner-up: (Czech Republic) Tomáš Macháč
- Score: 6–7^{(3–7)}, 6–2, 7–5

Events
Singles	Doubles
- Slovak Open

Dennis Novak was the defending champion but chose not to defend his title.

Maximilian Marterer won the title after defeating Tomáš Macháč 6–7^{(3–7)}, 6–2, 7–5 in the final.

== Seeds ==
1. (Finland) Emil Ruusuvuori (quarterfinals)
2. (Japan) Yasutaka Uchiyama (first round)
3. (Poland) Kamil Majchrzak (second round)
4. (France) Antoine Hoang (semifinals)
5. (Switzerland) Henri Laaksonen (first round)
6. (Serbia) Nikola Milojević (second round)
7. (Italy) Federico Gaio (first round)
8. (Italy) Lorenzo Giustino (second round)

== Draw ==
Key

- Q = Qualifier
- WC = Wild card
- LL = Lucky loser
- Alt = Alternate
- ITF = ITF entry
- PR = Protected ranking
- SR = Special ranking
- SE = Special exempt
- JE = Junior exempt
- JR = Junior Accelerator Programme entrant
- CO = College Accelerator Programme entrant
- NG = Next Gen Accelerator Program entrant
- w/o = Walkover
- r = Retired
- d = Defaulted

=== Finals ===
Semifinals
WC	(Slovakia) Lukáš Klein	6^{5}	2
Q	(Czech Republic) Tomáš Macháč	7^{7}	6
4	(France) Antoine Hoang	3	4
PR	(Germany) Maximilian Marterer	6	6

Final
Q	(Czech Republic) Tomáš Macháč	7^{7}	2	5
PR	(Germany) Maximilian Marterer	6^{3}	6	7

=== Top half ===
First round
1	(Finland) E Ruusuvuori	6	6
(Canada) S Diez	3	3
(France) A Rinderknech	6	6^{5}	7
(United Kingdom) L Broady	4	7^{7}	5
(Slovakia) F Horanský	4	4
WC	(Slovakia) L Klein	6	6
(Germany) Y Maden	5	6	4
8	(Italy) L Giustino	7	3	6
3	(Poland) K Majchrzak	6	6
WC	(Slovakia) A Molčan	2	1
Q	(Canada) B Schnur	4	4
Q	(Czech Republic) T Macháč	6	6
WC	(Czech Republic) J Lehečka	6	4	6^{5}
Alt	(Italy) M Viola	2	6	7^{7}
SE	(Italy) A Arnaboldi	5	6^{4}
6	(Serbia) N Milojević	7	7^{7}

Second round
1	(Finland) E Ruusuvuori	6	6
(France) A Rinderknech	1	4
WC	(Slovakia) L Klein	6	6
8	(Italy) L Giustino	4	3
3	(Poland) K Majchrzak	5	7^{7}	1
Q	(Czech Republic) T Macháč	7	6^{5}	6
Alt	(Italy) M Viola	7^{7}	4	6
6	(Serbia) N Milojević	6^{5}	6	3

Quarterfinals
1	(Finland) E Ruusuvuori	4	5
WC	(Slovakia) L Klein	6	7
Q	(Czech Republic) T Macháč	6	6
Alt	(Italy) M Viola	2	4

Semifinals
WC	(Slovakia) L Klein	6^{5}	2
Q	(Czech Republic) T Macháč	7^{7}	6

=== Bottom half ===
First round
5	(Switzerland) H Laaksonen	3	6	3
(Netherlands) B van de Zandschulp	6	3	6
Q	(France) M Bourgue	7^{7}	6
(Austria) S Ofner	6^{4}	1
(United States) M Cressy	6	4	6^{4}
(Italy) R Marcora	2	6	7^{7}
SE	(France) Q Halys	3	3
4	(France) A Hoang	6	6
7	(Italy) F Gaio	3	4
(Russia) R Safiullin	6	6
(Slovakia) L Lacko	5	6^{6}
(Ukraine) S Stakhovsky	7	7^{8}
Q	(Germany) J Lenz	5	4
PR	(Germany) M Marterer	7	6
(Slovenia) B Rola	7^{8}	6
2	(Japan) Y Uchiyama	6^{6}	4

Second round
(Netherlands) B van de Zandschulp	6^{0}	7^{8}	1
Q	(France) M Bourgue	7^{7}	6^{6}	6
(Italy) R Marcora	3	4
4	(France) A Hoang	6	6
(Russia) R Safiullin	6	4	4
(Ukraine) S Stakhovsky	4	6	6
PR	(Germany) M Marterer	7^{7}	6
(Slovenia) B Rola	6^{4}	2

Quarterfinals
Q	(France) M Bourgue
4	(France) A Hoang	w/o
(Ukraine) S Stakhovsky
PR	(Germany) M Marterer	w/o

Semifinals
4	(France) A Hoang	3	4
PR	(Germany) M Marterer	6	6
