= 2020 Slovak Open – Doubles =

Doubles
- 2020 Slovak Open

Final
- Champions: (Finland) Harri Heliövaara (Finland) Emil Ruusuvuori
- Runners-up: (Slovakia) Lukáš Klein (Slovakia) Alex Molčan
- Score: 6–4, 6–3

Events
Singles	Doubles
- Slovak Open

Frederik Nielsen and Tim Pütz were the defending champions but chose not to defend their title.

Harri Heliövaara and Emil Ruusuvuori won the title after defeating Lukáš Klein and Alex Molčan 6–4, 6–3 in the final.

== Seeds ==
1. (Ukraine) Denys Molchanov / (Ukraine) Sergiy Stakhovsky (quarterfinals)
2. (Poland) Karol Drzewiecki / (Poland) Szymon Walków (semifinals)
3. (United Kingdom) Lloyd Glasspool / (United States) Alex Lawson (first round)
4. (Monaco) Romain Arneodo / (France) Albano Olivetti (quarterfinals)

== Draw ==
Key

- Q = Qualifier
- WC = Wild card
- LL = Lucky loser
- Alt = Alternate
- ITF = ITF entry
- PR = Protected ranking
- SR = Special ranking
- SE = Special exempt
- JE = Junior exempt
- JR = Junior Accelerator Programme entrant
- CO = College Accelerator Programme entrant
- NG = Next Gen Accelerator Program entrant
- w/o = Walkover
- r = Retired
- d = Defaulted

First round
1	(Ukraine) D Molchanov (Ukraine) S Stakhovsky	7^{10}	6
(Germany) J Lenz (Germany) Y Maden	6^{8}	1
(United States) M Cressy (France) A Hoang	6^{7}	5
(Finland) H Heliövaara (Finland) E Ruusuvuori	7^{9}	7
4	(Monaco) R Arneodo (France) A Olivetti	6	7^{7}
(Croatia) I Sabanov (Croatia) M Sabanov	3	6^{5}
WC	(Slovakia) Michal Novanský (Slovakia) Lukáš Palovič	2	5
(France) M Guinard (France) A Rinderknech	6	7
(Slovakia) L Klein (Slovakia) A Molčan	7	6
(Russia) R Safiullin (Russia) A Vatutin	5	3
(United States) J Cerretani (Switzerland) L Margaroli	7^{7}	4	[12]
3	(United Kingdom) L Glasspool (United States) A Lawson	6^{3}	6	[10]
(Canada) S Diez (Slovenia) B Rola	6^{1}	6	[10]
WC	(Slovakia) F Horanský (Slovakia) L Pokorný	7^{7}	4	[6]
WC	(Slovakia) Tomáš Líška (Ukraine) Vadym Ursu	3	6	[9]
2	(Poland) K Drzewiecki (Poland) S Walków	6	3	[11]

Quarterfinals
1	(Ukraine) D Molchanov (Ukraine) S Stakhovsky	6	1	[4]
(Finland) H Heliövaara (Finland) E Ruusuvuori	4	6	[10]
4	(Monaco) R Arneodo (France) A Olivetti	4	6	[5]
(France) M Guinard (France) A Rinderknech	6	4	[10]
(Slovakia) L Klein (Slovakia) A Molčan	6^{7}	6	[10]
(United States) J Cerretani (Switzerland) L Margaroli	7^{9}	4	[5]
(Canada) S Diez (Slovenia) B Rola	6^{2}	5
2	(Poland) K Drzewiecki (Poland) S Walków	7^{7}	7

Semifinals
(Finland) H Heliövaara (Finland) E Ruusuvuori	7^{7}	7^{7}
(France) M Guinard (France) A Rinderknech	6^{2}	6^{4}
(Slovakia) L Klein (Slovakia) A Molčan	7^{7}	6
2	(Poland) K Drzewiecki (Poland) S Walków	6^{5}	3

Final
(Finland) H Heliövaara (Finland) E Ruusuvuori	6	6
(Slovakia) L Klein (Slovakia) A Molčan	4	3
