= 2010 Ritro Slovak Open – Women's doubles =

Women's doubles
- 2010 Ritro Slovak Open

Final
- Champions: (Finland) Emma Laine (France) Irena Pavlovic
- Runners-up: (France) Claire Feuerstein (Russia) Valeria Savinykh
- Score: 6–4, 6–4

Events
Singles	men	women
Doubles	men	women
← 2009 ·	Ritro Slovak Open	· 2011 →

Sofia Arvidsson and Michaëlla Krajicek were the defending champions, but chose not to compete.

== Seeds ==
1. (Finland) Emma Laine / (France) Irena Pavlovic (champions)
2. (France) Claire Feuerstein / (Russia) Valeria Savinykh (finalists)
3. (United Kingdom) Naomi Broady / (United Kingdom) Anna Smith (first round)
4. (Slovakia) Michaela Pochabová / (Slovakia) Lenka Wienerová (first round)

== Draw ==
=== Key ===
- Q = Qualifier
- WC = Wild card
- LL = Lucky loser
- Alt = Alternate
- SE = Special exempt
- PR = Protected ranking
- ITF = ITF entry
- JE = Junior exempt
- w/o = Walkover
- r = Retired
- d = Defaulted
- SR = Special ranking

First round
1	(Finland) E Laine (France) I Pavlovic	6	6
(Hungary) R-L Jani (Russia) V Solavieva	2	3
(Czech Republic) Iveta Gerlová (Czech Republic) Lucie Kriegsmannová	5	6	[10]
Alt	(Bulgaria) D Evtimova (Serbia) N Zorić	7	2	[6]
3	(United Kingdom) N Broady (United Kingdom) A Smith	2	3
(Czech Republic) Ka Plíšková (Czech Republic) Kr Plíšková	6	6
WC	(Slovakia) Na Vajdová (Slovakia) Ni Vajdová	5	3
(Austria) S Klemenschits (Austria) P Mayr	7	6
WC	(Slovakia) J Čepelová (Slovakia) C Škamlová	6	7
WC	(Slovakia) L Butkovská (Slovakia) AK Schmiedlová	3	6^{7}
(Germany) S Haas (Croatia) J Tinjić	4	6	[10]
4	(Slovakia) M Pochabová (Slovakia) L Wienerová	6	3	[8]
(France) N Fraňková (Austria) N Hofmanova	6	5	[6]
(Slovakia) K Kachlíková (Slovakia) L Tvarošková	3	7	[10]
(Czech Republic) H Birnerová (Slovakia) L Juríková	3	3
2	(France) C Feuerstein (Russia) V Savinykh	6	6

Quarterfinals
1	(Finland) E Laine (France) I Pavlovic	6	2	[10]
Alt	(Bulgaria) D Evtimova (Serbia) N Zorić	3	6	[2]
(Czech Republic) Ka Plíšková (Czech Republic) Kr Plíšková	6	6
(Austria) S Klemenschits (Austria) P Mayr	4	4
(Slovakia) J Čepelová (Slovakia) C Škamlová	6	7
(Germany) S Haas (Croatia) J Tinjić	4	6^{5}
(Slovakia) K Kachlíková (Slovakia) L Tvarošková	6	5	[7]
2	(France) C Feuerstein (Russia) V Savinykh	3	7	[10]

Semifinals
1	(Finland) E Laine (France) I Pavlovic	6	6
(Czech Republic) Ka Plíšková (Czech Republic) Kr Plíšková	4	2
(Slovakia) J Čepelová (Slovakia) C Škamlová	2	4
(France) C Feuerstein (Russia) V Savinykh	6	6

Final
1	(Finland) E Laine (France) I Pavlovic	6	6
(France) C Feuerstein (Russia) V Savinykh	4	4
