= 2010 Ritro Slovak Open – Men's doubles =

Men's doubles
- 2010 Ritro Slovak Open

Final
- Champions: (United Kingdom) Colin Fleming (United Kingdom) Jamie Murray
- Runners-up: (United States) Travis Parrott (Slovakia) Filip Polášek
- Score: 6–2, 3–6, [10–6]

Events
| Singles | men | women |
| Doubles | men | women |
| ← 2009 · | Ritro Slovak Open | · 2011 → |

Philipp Marx and Igor Zelenay were the defending champions; however, Marx decided not to participate.
Zelenay partners up with Daniele Bracciali. They lost in the first round against Brian Battistone and Andreas Siljeström.
British pair Colin Fleming and Jamie Murray defeated Travis Parrott and Filip Polášek 6–2, 3–6, [10–6] in the final.

== Seeds ==
1. (Italy) Daniele Bracciali / (Slovakia) Igor Zelenay (first round)
2. (Germany) Dustin Brown / (Netherlands) Rogier Wassen (first round)
3. (United Kingdom) Colin Fleming / (United Kingdom) Jamie Murray (champions)
4. (Australia) Jordan Kerr / (United Kingdom) Ken Skupski (first round)

== Draw ==
=== Key ===
- Q = Qualifier
- WC = Wild card
- LL = Lucky loser
- Alt = Alternate
- SE = Special exempt
- PR = Protected ranking
- ITF = ITF entry
- JE = Junior exempt
- w/o = Walkover
- r = Retired
- d = Defaulted
- SR = Special ranking

=== Draw ===
First round
1 | (Italy) D Bracciali (Slovakia) I Zelenay | 6^{4} | 6^{5}
(United States) B Battistone (Sweden) A Siljeström | 7 | 7
(Italy) A Motti (Spain) D Muñoz-De La Nava | 7 | 6^{6} | [8]
(Poland) T Bednarek (Croatia) L Zovko | 5 | 7 | [10]
3 | (United Kingdom) C Fleming (United Kingdom) J Murray | 6 | 6
(Slovakia) D Hrbatý (Slovakia) A Martin | 3 | 2
(Russia) M Elgin (Russia) T Gabashvili | 6 | 6
(Slovenia) B Kavčič (Czech Republic) J Pospíšil | 3 | 3
(Sweden) J Brunström (Switzerland) M Chiudinelli | 5 | 6 | [6]
(United States) J Cerretani (United States) R Ram | 7 | 3 | [10]
(United States) T Parrott (Slovakia) F Polášek | 6 | 7
4 | (Australia) J Kerr (United Kingdom) K Skupski | 2 | 5
(Slovakia) L Lacko (Czech Republic) L Rosol | 4 | 6 | [10]
(Slovakia) M Kližan (Slovakia) M Semjan | 6 | 1 | [5]
(Czech Republic) L Friedl (Czech Republic) D Škoch | 7 | 6
2 | (Germany) D Brown (Netherlands) R Wassen | 6^{5} | 3

Quarterfinals
(United States) B Battistone (Sweden) A Siljeström | 3 | 6 | [8]
(Poland) T Bednarek (Croatia) L Zovko | 6 | 3 | [10]
3 | (United Kingdom) C Fleming (United Kingdom) J Murray | 6 | 6
(Russia) M Elgin (Russia) T Gabashvili | 2 | 3
(United States) J Cerretani (United States) R Ram | 5 | 5
(United States) T Parrott (Slovakia) F Polášek | 7 | 7
(Slovakia) L Lacko (Czech Republic) L Rosol | 6^{6} | 3
(Czech Republic) L Friedl (Czech Republic) D Škoch | 7 | 6

Semifinals
(Poland) T Bednarek (Croatia) L Zovko | 3 | 4
3 | (United Kingdom) C Fleming (United Kingdom) J Murray | 6 | 6
(United States) T Parrott (Slovakia) F Polášek | 7 | 6
(Czech Republic) L Friedl (Czech Republic) D Škoch | 6^{2} | 2

Final
3 | (United Kingdom) C Fleming (United Kingdom) J Murray | 6 | 3 | [10]
(United States) T Parrott (Slovakia) F Polášek | 2 | 6 | [6]
