= 2010 Ritro Slovak Open =

- Date: November 15–21
- Edition: 11th
- Surface: Hard (indoor)
- Location: Bratislava, Slovakia

Champions

Men's singles
- (Slovakia) Martin Kližan

Women's singles
- (Ukraine) Kateryna Bondarenko

Men's doubles
- (United Kingdom) Colin Fleming / (United Kingdom) Jamie Murray

Women's doubles
- (Finland) Emma Laine / (France) Irena Pavlovic
← 2009 ·	Ritro Slovak Open	· 2011 →

The 2010 Ritro Slovak Open was a professional tennis tournament played on indoor hard courts. It was the eleventh edition of the tournament which was part of the Tretorn SERIE+ series of the 2010 ATP Challenger Tour and the 2010 ITF Women's Circuit. It took place in Bratislava, Slovakia between 15 and 21 November 2010.

== ATP entrants ==
=== Seeds ===
Country	Player	Rank^{1}	Seed
RUS	Teymuraz Gabashvili	81	1
UKR	Illya Marchenko	96	2
FRA	Adrian Mannarino	97	3
POL	Michał Przysiężny	100	4
SVK	Lukáš Lacko	102	5
GER	Dustin Brown	105	6
SVN	Blaž Kavčič	109	7
RUS	Igor Kunitsyn	111	8

- Rankings are as of November 8, 2010.

=== Other entrants ===
The following players received wildcards into the singles main draw:

- (Slovakia) Dominik Hrbatý
- (Slovakia) Martin Kližan
- (Slovakia) Andrej Martin
- (Slovakia) Marek Semjan

The following player received a Special Exempt into the singles main draw:

- (United Kingdom) James Ward

The following players received entry from the qualifying draw:

- (United States) Ryan Harrison
- (Russia) Mikhail Ledovskikh
- (Slovakia) Miloslav Mečíř Jr.
- (Finland) Timo Nieminen

== WTA entrants ==
=== Seeds ===
Country	Player	Rank^{1}	Seed
AUT	Patricia Mayr	100	1
RUS	Evgeniya Rodina	103	2
CZE	Andrea Hlaváčková	106	3
UKR	Kateryna Bondarenko	113	4
SVK	Zuzana Kučová	122	5
FRA	Irena Pavlovic	200	6
CZE	Karolína Plíšková	203	7
GER	Mona Barthel	208	8

- Rankings are as of November 8, 2010.

=== Other entrants ===
The following players received wildcards into the singles main draw:

- (Slovakia) Anna Karolína Schmiedlová
- (Slovakia) Chantal Škamlová
- (Slovakia) Jana Čepelová
- (Slovakia) Zuzana Luknárová

The following players received entry from the qualifying draw:

- (Germany) Sina Haas
- (Hungary) Réka-Luca Jani
- (Slovakia) Klaudia Boczová
- (Germany) Julia Babilon
- (Slovakia) Michaela Hončová
- (Croatia) Jasmina Tinjić
- (Slovakia) Lenka Tvarošková
- (Slovakia) Lucia Butkovská

== Champions ==
=== Men's singles ===
(Slovakia) Martin Kližan def. (Austria) Stefan Koubek, 7–6(4), 6–2

=== Women's singles ===
(Ukraine) Kateryna Bondarenko def. (Russia) Evgeniya Rodina, 7–6(3), 6–2

=== Men's doubles ===
(United Kingdom) Colin Fleming / (United Kingdom) Jamie Murray def. (United States) Travis Parrott / (Slovakia) Filip Polášek, 6–2, 3–6, [10–6]

=== Women's doubles ===
(Finland) Emma Laine / (France) Irena Pavlovic def. (France) Claire Feuerstein / (Russia) Valeria Savinykh, 6–4, 6–4
