= 2010 Ritro Slovak Open – Women's singles =

Women's singles
- 2010 Ritro Slovak Open

Final
- Champion: (Ukraine) Kateryna Bondarenko
- Runner-up: (Russia) Evgeniya Rodina
- Score: 7–6^{(7–3)}, 6–2

Events
Singles	men	women
Doubles	men	women
← 2009 ·	Ritro Slovak Open	· 2011 →

Evgeniya Rodina was the defending champion.

== Seeds ==
1. (Austria) Patricia Mayr (first round)
2. (Russia) Evgeniya Rodina (final)
3. (Czech Republic) Andrea Hlaváčková (quarterfinals)
4. (Ukraine) Kateryna Bondarenko (champion)
5. (Czech Republic) Zuzana Kučová (semifinals)
6. (France) Irena Pavlovic (first round)
7. (Czech Republic) Karolína Plíšková (quarterfinals)
8. (Germany) Mona Barthel (semifinals)

== Draw ==
=== Key ===
- Q = Qualifier
- WC = Wild card
- LL = Lucky loser
- Alt = Alternate
- SE = Special exempt
- PR = Protected ranking
- ITF = ITF entry
- JE = Junior exempt
- w/o = Walkover
- r = Retired
- d = Defaulted
- SR = Special ranking

=== Finals ===
Semifinals
8	(Germany) Mona Barthel	5	5
4	(Ukraine) Kateryna Bondarenko	7	7
5	(Slovakia) Zuzana Kučová	6	1	1
2	(Russia) Evgeniya Rodina	1	6	6

Final
4	(Ukraine) Kateryna Bondarenko	7	6
2	(Russia) Evgeniya Rodina	6^{3}	2

=== Top half ===
First round
1	(Austria) P Mayr	6	4	0^{r}
(Austria) N Hofmanova	3	6	1
Q	(Germany) S Haas	7	2	6
(United Kingdom) N Broady	6^{4}	6	1
(Slovakia) L Wienerová	6	1	6
WC	(Slovakia) C Škamlová	3	6	3
(Bulgaria) D Evtimova	1	1
8	(Germany) M Barthel	6	6
4	(Ukraine) K Bondarenko	6	6
(Spain) L Costas	1	2
WC	(Slovakia) J Čepelová	6	7
Q	(Hungary) R-L Jani	4	5
(Czech Republic) Kr Plíšková	1	7	7
(France) C Feuerstein	6	6^{4}	6^{3}
Q	(Slovakia) K Boczová	1	2
7	(Czech Republic) Ka Plíšková	6	6

Second round
(Austria) N Hofmanova	6	6^{5}	5
Q	(Germany) S Haas	4	7	7
(Slovakia) L Wienerová	1	3
8	(Germany) M Barthel	6	6
4	(Ukraine) K Bondarenko	7	7
WC	(Slovakia) J Čepelová	5	5
(Czech Republic) Kr Plíšková	3	3
7	(Czech Republic) Ka Plíšková	6	6

Quarterfinals
Q	(Germany) S Haas	6	2	6^{4}
8	(Germany) M Barthel	3	6	7
4	(Ukraine) K Bondarenko	6	6
7	(Czech Republic) Ka Plíšková	4	1

Semifinals
8	(Germany) M Barthel	5	5
4	(Ukraine) K Bondarenko	7	7

=== Bottom half ===
First round
5	(Slovakia) Z Kučová	6	6
(Slovakia) L Juríková	3	0
Q	(Germany) J Babilon	4	3
Q	(Slovakia) L Butkovská	6	6
(Finland) E Laine	6	2	6
WC	(Slovakia) Z Luknárová	2	6	2
(Italy) A Remondina	6	1	6^{4}
3	(Czech Republic) A Hlaváčková	3	6	7
6	(France) I Pavlovic	1	3
(Russia) V Savinykh	6	6
WC	(Slovakia) AK Schmiedlová	1	1
Q	(Slovakia) M Hončová	6	6
Q	(Croatia) J Tinjić	6^{5}	4
(Slovakia) K Kučová	7	6
Q	(Slovakia) L Tvarošková	6^{8}	1
2	(Russia) E Rodina	7	6

Second round
5	(Slovakia) Z Kučová	6	5	7
Q	(Slovakia) L Butkovská	2	7	5
(Finland) E Laine	1	1
3	(Czech Republic) A Hlaváčková	6	6
(Russia) V Savinykh	4	6	6
Q	(Slovakia) M Hončová	6	2	3
(Slovakia) K Kučová	2	1
2	(Russia) E Rodina	6	6

Quarterfinals
5	(Slovakia) Z Kučová	3	7	6
3	(Czech Republic) A Hlaváčková	6	5	3
(Russia) V Savinykh	3	4
2	(Russia) E Rodina	6	6

Semifinals
5	(Slovakia) Z Kučová	6	1	1
2	(Russia) E Rodina	1	6	6
