= 2009 Ritro Slovak Open – Singles =

Singles
- 2009 Ritro Slovak Open

Final
- Champion: (Germany) Michael Berrer
- Runner-up: (Slovakia) Dominik Hrbatý
- Score: 6–7(6), 6–4, 7–6(3)

Events
Singles	Doubles
← 2008 ·	Ritro Slovak Open	· 2010 →

Jan Hernych, who was the defending champion, chose to not compete this year.
Michael Berrer won in the final 6–7(6), 6–4, 7–6(3), against Dominik Hrbatý.

== Seeds ==
1. (Uzbekistan) Denis Istomin (first round)
2. (Slovakia) Lukáš Lacko (semifinals)
3. (Czech Republic) ~~Jan Hájek~~ (withdrew)
4. (Germany) Björn Phau (second round)
5. (Finland) Jarkko Nieminen (first round)
6. (France) ~~Stéphane Robert~~ (withdrew)
7. (Austria) Stefan Koubek (quarterfinals)
8. (Israel) Harel Levy (semifinals)

== Draw ==
=== Key ===
- Q = Qualifier
- WC = Wild card
- LL = Lucky loser
- Alt = Alternate
- SE = Special exempt
- PR = Protected ranking
- ITF = ITF entry
- JE = Junior exempt
- w/o = Walkover
- r = Retired
- d = Defaulted
- SR = Special ranking

=== Finals ===
Semifinals
(Slovakia) Dominik Hrbatý	3	6	6
8	(Israel) Harel Levy	6	3	3
(Germany) Michael Berrer	2	6	7
2	(Slovakia) Lukáš Lacko	6	2	6^{2}

Final
(Slovakia) Dominik Hrbatý	7	4	6^{3}
(Germany) Michael Berrer	6^{6}	6	7

=== Top half ===
First round
1	(Uzbekistan) D Istomin	6	3	2
Q	(Australia) R Junaid	3	6	6
(Jamaica) D Brown	6	7
(Czech Republic) L Rosol	2	5
(Belgium) S Darcis	3	2
(Slovakia) D Hrbatý	6	6
Q	(Finland) J Paukku	4	2
LL	(Slovakia) M Semjan	6	6
4	(Germany) B Phau	7	6
WC	(Slovakia) F Horanský	6^{6}	2
(United Kingdom) A Bogdanovic	6	6
(Croatia) A Veić	3	4
Q	(Slovakia) I Klec	3	5
(Switzerland) S Bohli	6	7
(Spain) I Navarro	6^{2}	5
8	(Israel) H Levy	7	7

Second round
Q	(Australia) R Junaid	6^{5}	7	6
(Jamaica) D Brown	7	6^{5}	2
(Slovakia) D Hrbatý	6	6
LL	(Slovakia) M Semjan	4	2
4	(Germany) B Phau	6	3	2
(United Kingdom) A Bogdanovic	4	6	6
(Switzerland) S Bohli	4	6	6^{4}
8	(Israel) H Levy	6	3	7

Quarterfinals
Q	(Australia) R Junaid	1	6	6^{4}
(Slovakia) D Hrbatý	6	3	7
(United Kingdom) A Bogdanovic	4	6	3
8	(Israel) H Levy	6	3	6

Semifinals
(Slovakia) D Hrbatý	3	6	6
8	(Israel) H Levy	6	3	3

=== Bottom half ===
First round
7	(Austria) S Koubek	6	6
(Slovakia) M Kližan	3	1
(Switzerland) M Lammer	1	6^{4}
LL	(Poland) M Przysiężny	6	7
WC	(Slovakia) K Čapkovič	3	4
WC	(Poland) J Janowicz	6	6
(Germany) M Berrer	3	6	6
Q	(Czech Republic) J Minář	6	4	3
5	(Finland) J Nieminen	6	3	2
(Kazakhstan) A Golubev	1	6	6
WC	(Slovakia) A Martin	6
(Czech Republic) R Vik	2	r
SE	(Germany) T Kamke	6	6
(Italy) A Arnaboldi	3	0
(Romania) A Ungur	1	6	3
2	(Slovakia) L Lacko	6	4	6

Second round
7	(Austria) S Koubek	4	6	7
LL	(Poland) M Przysiężny	6	3	6^{4}
WC	(Poland) J Janowicz	3	6	2
(Germany) M Berrer	6	3	6
(Kazakhstan) A Golubev	7	7
WC	(Slovakia) A Martin	6^{5}	6^{5}
SE	(Germany) T Kamke	3	6^{4}
2	(Slovakia) L Lacko	6	7

Quarterfinals
7	(Austria) S Koubek	4	6^{1}
(Germany) M Berrer	6	7
(Kazakhstan) A Golubev	w/o
2	(Slovakia) L Lacko

Semifinals
(Germany) M Berrer	2	6	7
2	(Slovakia) L Lacko	6	2	6^{2}
