= 2013 Bet-at-home Cup Kitzbühel – Doubles =

Doubles
- 2013 Bet-at-home Cup Kitzbühel

Final
- Champions: (Germany) Martin Emmrich (Germany) Christopher Kas
- Runners-up: (Czech Republic) František Čermák (Czech Republic) Lukáš Dlouhý
- Score: 6–4, 6–3

Details
- Draw: 16
- Seeds: 4

Events
| Singles | Doubles |
- Bet-at-home Cup Kitzbühel

František Čermák and Julian Knowle were the defending champions but decided not to participate together. Knowle teamed up with Leonardo Mayer, but lost in the first round to Daniel Brands and Michal Mertiňák.
Čermák played alongside Lukáš Dlouhý, but lost in the final to Martin Emmrich and Christopher Kas, 4–6, 3–6.

== Seeds ==
1. (Czech Republic) František Čermák / (Czech Republic) Lukáš Dlouhý (final)
2. (Italy) Daniele Bracciali / (Slovakia) Filip Polášek (first round)
3. (Austria) Oliver Marach / (Spain) Fernando Verdasco (semifinals)
4. (Germany) Martin Emmrich / (Germany) Christopher Kas (champions)

== Draw ==
Key

- Q = Qualifier
- WC = Wild card
- LL = Lucky loser
- Alt = Alternate
- ITF = ITF entry
- PR = Protected ranking
- SR = Special ranking
- SE = Special exempt
- JE = Junior exempt
- JR = Junior Accelerator Programme entrant
- CO = College Accelerator Programme entrant
- NG = Next Gen Accelerator Program entrant
- w/o = Walkover
- r = Retired
- d = Defaulted

=== Draw ===
First round
1 | (Czech Republic) F Čermák (Czech Republic) L Dlouhý | 6^{4} | 6 | [10]
(Germany) D Brown (Australia) P Hanley | 7^{7} | 4 | [8]
PR | (Argentina) L Arnold Ker (Argentina) J Mónaco | 6 | 7
WC | (Germany) C Becke (Germany) P Kohlschreiber | 3 | 5
3 | (Austria) O Marach (Spain) F Verdasco | 6 | 7^{7}
(United States) N Monroe (Germany) S Stadler | 3 | 6^{4}
(Austria) J Knowle (Argentina) L Mayer | 4 | 4
(Germany) D Brands (Slovakia) M Mertiňák | 6 | 6
WC | (Austria) G Melzer (Austria) J Melzer | 6 | 7
PR | (Czech Republic) J Levinský (Germany) P Marx | 2 | 5
(Romania) V Hănescu (Romania) F Mergea | 4 | 2
4 | (Germany) M Emmrich (Germany) C Kas | 6 | 6
(Argentina) C Berlocq (Argentina) H Zeballos | 3 | 0
(Netherlands) R Haase (South Africa) R Klaasen | 6 | 6
(United Kingdom) J Murray (Australia) J Peers | 6 | 0 | [12]
2 | (Italy) D Bracciali (Slovakia) F Polášek | 4 | 6 | [10]

Quarterfinals
1 | (Czech Republic) F Čermák (Czech Republic) L Dlouhý | 2 | 7 | [10]
PR | (Argentina) L Arnold Ker (Argentina) J Mónaco | 6 | 5 | [8]
3 | (Austria) O Marach (Spain) F Verdasco | 2 | 6 | [10]
(Germany) D Brands (Slovakia) M Mertiňák | 6 | 4 | [5]
WC | (Austria) G Melzer (Austria) J Melzer | 6^{6} | 3
4 | (Germany) M Emmrich (Germany) C Kas | 7^{8} | 6
(Netherlands) R Haase (South Africa) R Klaasen | 1 | 3
(United Kingdom) J Murray (Australia) J Peers | 6 | 6

Semifinals
1 | (Czech Republic) F Čermák (Czech Republic) L Dlouhý | 7^{7} | 6
3 | (Austria) O Marach (Spain) F Verdasco | 6^{5} | 4
4 | (Germany) M Emmrich (Germany) C Kas | 7 | 7^{7}
(United Kingdom) J Murray (Australia) J Peers | 5 | 6^{4}

Final
1 | (Czech Republic) F Čermák (Czech Republic) L Dlouhý | 4 | 3
4 | (Germany) M Emmrich (Germany) C Kas | 6 | 6
