= 2009 Ritro Slovak Open – Doubles =

Doubles
- 2009 Ritro Slovak Open

Final
- Champions: (Germany) Philipp Marx (Slovakia) Igor Zelenay
- Runners-up: (Czech Republic) Leoš Friedl (Czech Republic) David Škoch
- Score: 6–4, 6–4

Events
Singles	Doubles
- Ritro Slovak Open

František Čermák and Łukasz Kubot chose to not defend their title.
Philipp Marx and Igor Zelenay defeated Leoš Friedl and David Škoch 6–4, 6–4 in the final.

== Seeds ==
1. (Czech Republic) Jaroslav Levinský / (Slovakia) Filip Polášek (first round)
2. (United Kingdom) Ross Hutchins / (Romania) Horia Tecău (semifinals)
3. (Czech Republic) Leoš Friedl / (Czech Republic) David Škoch (final)
4. (Germany) Philipp Marx / (Slovakia) Igor Zelenay (champions)

== Draw ==
Key

- Q = Qualifier
- WC = Wild card
- LL = Lucky loser
- Alt = Alternate
- ITF = ITF entry
- PR = Protected ranking
- SR = Special ranking
- SE = Special exempt
- JE = Junior exempt
- JR = Junior Accelerator Programme entrant
- CO = College Accelerator Programme entrant
- NG = Next Gen Accelerator Program entrant
- w/o = Walkover
- r = Retired
- d = Defaulted

=== Draw ===
First round
1	(Czech Republic) J Levinský (Slovakia) F Polášek	2	6	[14]
WC	(Slovakia) K Čapkovič (Slovakia) A Martin	6	4	[16]
(Austria) S Koubek (Austria) M Slanar	4	4
(Slovakia) D Hrbatý (Slovakia) L Lacko	6	6
4	(Germany) P Marx (Slovakia) I Zelenay	6	6
WC	(Slovakia) F Horanský (Slovakia) J Kovalík	3	4
WC	(Slovakia) M Kližan (Slovakia) M Semjan	7	6
(Denmark) F Nielsen (Australia) J Sirianni	5	3
(Finland) J Nieminen (Pakistan) A-u-H Qureshi	7	5	[6]
(Kazakhstan) A Golubev (Uzbekistan) D Istomin	6^{7}	7	[10]
(Israel) H Levy (Spain) I Navarro	4	6	[13]
3	(Czech Republic) L Friedl (Czech Republic) D Škoch	6	1	[15]
(Australia) R Junaid (Italy) A Motti	6	7
(Germany) F Moser (Croatia) L Zovko	2	5
(United Kingdom) J Marray (United Kingdom) J Murray	4	4
2	(United Kingdom) R Hutchins (Romania) H Tecău	6	6

Quarterfinals
WC	(Slovakia) K Čapkovič (Slovakia) A Martin	6	4	[7]
(Slovakia) D Hrbatý (Slovakia) L Lacko	1	6	[10]
4	(Germany) P Marx (Slovakia) I Zelenay	6	6
WC	(Slovakia) M Kližan (Slovakia) M Semjan	3	4
(Kazakhstan) A Golubev (Uzbekistan) D Istomin	6	3	[4]
3	(Czech Republic) L Friedl (Czech Republic) D Škoch	3	6	[10]
(Australia) R Junaid (Italy) A Motti	7	2	[8]
2	(United Kingdom) R Hutchins (Romania) H Tecău	6^{3}	6	[10]

Semifinals
(Slovakia) D Hrbatý (Slovakia) L Lacko	1	4
4	(Germany) P Marx (Slovakia) I Zelenay	6	6
3	(Czech Republic) L Friedl (Czech Republic) D Škoch	6	7
2	(United Kingdom) R Hutchins (Romania) H Tecău	4	6^{6}

Final
4	(Germany) P Marx (Slovakia) I Zelenay	6	6
3	(Czech Republic) L Friedl (Czech Republic) D Škoch	4	4
