= 2013 Bet-at-home Cup Kitzbühel – Singles =

Singles
- 2013 Bet-at-home Cup Kitzbühel

Final
- Champion: (Spain) Marcel Granollers
- Runner-up: (Argentina) Juan Mónaco
- Score: 0–6, 7–6^{(7–3)}, 6–4

Details
- Draw: 28
- Seeds: 8

Events
Singles	Doubles
- Bet-at-home Cup Kitzbühel

Robin Haase was the two-time defending champion, but lost in the semifinals to Marcel Granollers. Eighth-seeded Granollers went on to win the title, defeating Juan Mónaco in the final, 0–6, 7–6^{(7–3)}, 6–4.

== Seeds ==
The top four seeds receive a bye into the second round.

1. (Germany) Philipp Kohlschreiber (second round)
2. (Argentina) Juan Mónaco (final)
3. (Spain) Fernando Verdasco (quarterfinals)
4. (Austria) Jürgen Melzer (second round)
5. (Argentina) Carlos Berlocq (first round)
6. (Spain) Roberto Bautista Agut (withdrew)
7. (Spain) Albert Montañés (semifinals)
8. (Spain) Marcel Granollers (champion)

== Draw ==
Key

- Q = Qualifier
- WC = Wild card
- LL = Lucky loser
- Alt = Alternate
- ITF = ITF entry
- PR = Protected ranking
- SR = Special ranking
- SE = Special exempt
- JE = Junior exempt
- JR = Junior Accelerator Programme entrant
- CO = College Accelerator Programme entrant
- NG = Next Gen Accelerator Program entrant
- w/o = Walkover
- r = Retired
- d = Defaulted

=== Finals ===
Semifinals
8	(Spain) Marcel Granollers	7^{7}	3	6
(Netherlands) Robin Haase	6^{0}	6	4
7	(Spain) Albert Montañés	6^{2}	5
2	(Argentina) Juan Mónaco	7^{7}	7

Final
8	(Spain) Marcel Granollers	0	7^{7}	6
2	(Argentina) Juan Mónaco	6	6^{3}	4

=== Top half ===
First round
(France) K de Schepper	4	4
(Argentina) L Mayer	6	6
Q	(Austria) M Fischer	5	6	3
(Argentina) H Zeballos	7	1	6
WC	(Croatia) M Pavić	6^{2}	2
8	(Spain) M Granollers	7^{7}	6
(Brazil) T Bellucci	7^{7}	3	6^{4}
(Spain) G García López	6^{1}	6	7^{7}
(France) G Rufin	4	6^{4}
(Netherlands) R Haase	6	7^{7}
(Germany) D Brands	7^{7}	2	6
5	(Argentina) C Berlocq	6^{4}	6	2

Second round
1	(Germany) P Kohlschreiber	4	6^{4}
(Argentina) L Mayer	6	7^{7}
(Argentina) H Zeballos	0	0^{r}
8	(Spain) M Granollers	6	2
3	(Spain) F Verdasco	6	7^{9}
(Spain) G García López	2	6^{7}
(Netherlands) R Haase	6	6
(Germany) D Brands	4	1

Quarterfinals
(Argentina) L Mayer	3	1
8	(Spain) M Granollers	6	6
3	(Spain) F Verdasco	6	4	3
(Netherlands) R Haase	4	6	6

Semifinals
8	(Spain) M Granollers	7^{7}	3	6
(Netherlands) R Haase	6^{0}	6	4

=== Bottom half ===
First round
7	(Spain) A Montañés	6	6
(Romania) A Ungur	4	2
(Slovenia) A Bedene	2	1
(Romania) V Hănescu	6	6
(Russia) A Kuznetsov	2	5
WC	(Austria) D Thiem	6	7
LL	(Bosnia and Herzegovina) A Šetkić	2	1
Q	(Czech Republic) J Hájek	6	6
Q	(Croatia) A Veić	1	3
(Spain) D Gimeno Traver	6	6
WC	(Austria) A Haider-Maurer	6	6
Q	(Austria) D Novak	4	4

Second round
7	(Spain) A Montañés	7^{7}	3	7^{7}
(Romania) V Hănescu	6^{2}	6	6^{5}
WC	(Austria) D Thiem	7	6
4	(Austria) J Melzer	5	3
Q	(Czech Republic) J Hájek	3	3
(Spain) D Gimeno Traver	6	6
WC	(Austria) A Haider-Maurer	3	4
2	(Argentina) J Mónaco	6	6

Quarterfinals
7	(Spain) A Montañés	6	6
WC	(Austria) D Thiem	4	3
(Spain) D Gimeno Traver	2	6	4
2	(Argentina) J Mónaco	6	3	6

Semifinals
7	(Spain) A Montañés	6^{2}	5
2	(Argentina) J Mónaco	7^{7}	7

== Qualifying ==
=== Seeds ===
1. (Ukraine) Sergiy Stakhovsky (first round)
2. (Serbia) Dušan Lajović (first round)
3. (Slovakia) Andrej Martin (first round)
4. (Czech Republic) Jan Hájek (qualified)
5. (Croatia) Antonio Veić (qualified)
6. (Germany) Dustin Brown (second round)
7. (Czech Republic) Jan Hernych (first round)
8. (Argentina) Facundo Bagnis (first round)

=== Qualifiers ===
1. (Austria) Martin Fischer
2. (Croatia) Antonio Veić
3. (Austria) Dennis Novak
4. (Czech Republic) Jan Hájek

=== Lucky losers ===
1. (Bosnia and Herzegovina) Aldin Šetkić

=== Qualifying draw ===
==== First qualifier ====
First round
1	(Ukraine) Sergiy Stakhovsky	3	4
(Austria) Michael Linzer	6	6
WC	(Austria) Dominic Weidinger	6	3	2
(Austria) Gerald Melzer	3	6	6
(Austria) Martin Fischer	7^{7}	6
(Bosnia and Herzegovina) Tomislav Brkić	6^{4}	2
(Brazil) André Ghem	3	7	6
8	(Argentina) Facundo Bagnis	6	5	0

Second round
(Austria) Michael Linzer	6	0	0^{r}
(Austria) Gerald Melzer	4	6	2
(Austria) Martin Fischer	6	5	6
(Brazil) André Ghem	3	7	1

Qualifying competition
(Austria) Gerald Melzer	4	2
(Austria) Martin Fischer	6	6

==== Second qualifier ====
First round
2	(Serbia) Dušan Lajović	3	4
(Egypt) Mohamed Safwat	6	6
(Italy) Marco Cecchinato	7	6
(Bulgaria) Alexandar Lazov	5	1
(Austria) Marc Rath	4	4
(Slovakia) Pavol Červenák	6	6
(Italy) Riccardo Bellotti	4	6	5
5	(Croatia) Antonio Veić	6	4	7

Second round
(Egypt) Mohamed Safwat	3	4
(Italy) Marco Cecchinato	6	6
(Slovakia) Pavol Červenák	6	4	2
5	(Croatia) Antonio Veić	4	6	6

Qualifying competition
(Italy) Marco Cecchinato	6	4	1
5	(Croatia) Antonio Veić	3	6	6

==== Third qualifier ====
First round
3	(Slovakia) Andrej Martin	1	5
(Italy) Lorenzo Giustino	6	7
WC	(Austria) Dennis Novak	6	6
WC	(Austria) Matthias Haim	1	4
(Bulgaria) Tihomir Grozdanov	6	6
WC	(Italy) Joy Vigani	0	1
(Germany) Robin Kern	6	6
7	(Czech Republic) Jan Hernych	3	4

Second round
(Italy) Lorenzo Giustino	6	6^{5}	1
WC	(Austria) Dennis Novak	3	7^{7}	6
(Bulgaria) Tihomir Grozdanov	7^{7}	6
(Germany) Robin Kern	6^{4}	3

Qualifying competition
WC	(Austria) Dennis Novak	6	6
(Bulgaria) Tihomir Grozdanov	3	2

==== Fourth qualifier ====
First round
4	(Czech Republic) Jan Hájek	6	6
(Austria) Nicolas Reissig	1	3
(Serbia) Danilo Petrović	7	7^{10}
(France) Florian Reynet	5	6^{8}
(Bosnia and Herzegovina) Aldin Šetkić	6	6
(Austria) Tristan-Samuel Weissborn	4	4
(Kazakhstan) Evgeny Korolev	6	2	3
6	(Germany) Dustin Brown	4	6	6

Second round
4	(Czech Republic) Jan Hájek	6	6
(Serbia) Danilo Petrović	3	2
(Bosnia and Herzegovina) Aldin Šetkić	6	7
6	(Germany) Dustin Brown	4	5

Qualifying competition
4	(Czech Republic) Jan Hájek	6	6
(Bosnia and Herzegovina) Aldin Šetkić	0	4
