= Alexandra Heminsley =

British journalist and writer

Alexandra Heminsley (born 1976) is a British journalist and writer, living in Brighton and Hove. She has written Running Like a Girl (2013), Leap In (2018) and Some Body to Love (2021).

== Career ==
Heminsley worked in publishing for six years before becoming a freelance journalist and broadcaster in 2004. She was books editor and commissioning editor of Elle magazine for eight years until 2014 and for the BBC Radio 2 Arts Show with Claudia Winkleman for ten years. She has reviewed books for various newspapers and currently does so for the Sara Cox show on BBC Radio 2. She is also books editor for Grazia magazine.

== Publications ==
=== Books by Heminsley ===
- Ex and the City: You're Nobody 'til Somebody Dumps You. Pan (UK), 2007. ISBN 9780330452427.
- Running Like a Girl: Notes on Learning to Run. London: Cornerstone, 2013. ISBN 9780099558958.
- Leap In: a Woman, Some Waves, and the Will to Swim. London: Windmill, 2018. ISBN 978-1681777726.
- Some Body to Love: A Family Story. London: Chatto & Windus, 2021. ISBN 9781784743079.

=== Books co-written with others ===
- Knowing the Score: My Family and Our Tennis Story. London: Chatto & Windus, 2017. With Judy Murray. ISBN 978-1784741792.
