= Aberdeen Cup =

The Aberdeen Cup was an annual exhibition tennis tournament held between national teams representing England and Scotland. It was hosted in the Aberdeen Exhibition Centre in Aberdeen, Scotland. The tournament was held in 2005 and 2006, but there has been no indication that the tournament will be played again.

== History ==
The involvement of Andy Murray, who rose into the top 100 in the ATP rankings in 2005, was largely the source of public interest in the competition. The inaugural tournament, held in that year, was won by Scotland. This event was the only time that Murray played Greg Rusedski; they never met on the ATP tour. This was the first time that Andy and his brother Jamie Murray played doubles as seniors.

The following year, Scotland successfully defended their title amidst criticism from Murray regarding the court surface and the ticket prices, as well as low attendance rates compared to the previous year, and the perceived lack of quality English players for future events.

The 2005 tournament was broadcast live on Sky Sports, but in 2006, only highlights were shown on Sky Sports.

== Format ==
The Scotland team was captained by Andy Murray, with Greg Rusedski leading the England side. The tournament was held in a similar form to a Davis Cup match. There were rubbers in both singles and doubles play. Unlike the Davis Cup, there were also male and female junior players taking part, with each of their rubbers worth half that of a senior rubber, and one ladies player on each team. Furthermore, with the exception of the 'headline' matches, between the two team captains, senior matches were only two sets long, with a 1–1 tie settled by tie-break. The junior matches were played over four games (see: Tennis score).

== Results ==
Year	Winner	Score	Loser	Score	Venue
2005	Scotland	4 1/2	England	2 1/2	Aberdeen Exhibition Centre
2006	Scotland	6 1/2	England	1	Aberdeen Exhibition Centre

== 2005 ==
=== Saturday 26 November ===
(Scotland)	Results	(England)
Jamie Murray	0–1	David Sherwood
Elena Baltacha	1–0	Katie O’Brien
Clare Sawyer	1/2–0	Joanna Henderson
Andy Murray	0–1	Greg Rusedski

=== Sunday 27 November ===
(Scotland)	Results	(England)
Andy Murray/ Jamie Murray	1–0	Greg Rusedski/ David Sherwood
Scott Lister	0–1/2	Oliver Golding
Jamie Murray/ Elena Baltacha	1–0	David Sherwood/ Katie O’Brien
Andy Murray	1–0	Greg Rusedski

== 2006 ==
=== Saturday 25 November ===
(Scotland)	Results	(England)
Jamie Murray		James Auckland
Caitlin Steel		Hannah James
James McKie		James Chaudry
Elena Baltacha		Katie O’Brien
Andy Murray		Greg Rusedski

=== Sunday 26 November ===
(Scotland)	Results	(England)
Andy Murray/ Jamie Murray	1–0	Greg Rusedski/ James Auckland
James McKie/ Caitlin Steel	1/2–0	James Chaudry / Hannah James
Jamie Murray/ Elena Baltacha	1–0	James Auckland/ Katie O’Brien
Andy Murray	1–0	Greg Rusedski
