= 2013 Bet-at-home Cup Kitzbühel =

- Date: 28 July – 3 August
- Edition: 69th
- Category: World Tour 250 series
- Surface: Clay / outdoor
- Location: Kitzbühel, Austria
- Venue: Tennis stadium Kitzbühel

Champions

Singles
- (Spain) Marcel Granollers

Doubles
- (Germany) Martin Emmrich / (Germany) Christopher Kas
- Bet-at-home Cup Kitzbühel

The 2013 Bet-at-home Cup Kitzbühel was a men's tennis tournament played on outdoor clay courts. It was the 69th edition of the Austrian Open Kitzbühel, as part of the World Tour 250 series of the 2013 ATP World Tour. It took place at the Tennis stadium Kitzbühel in Kitzbuehel Austria, from 28 July through 3 August 2013. Eighth-seeded Marcel Granollers won the singles title.

== Finals ==
=== Singles ===
- (Spain) Marcel Granollers defeated (Argentina) Juan Mónaco, 0–6, 7–6^{(7–3)}, 6–4

=== Doubles ===
- (Germany) Martin Emmrich / (Germany) Christopher Kas defeated (Czech Republic) František Čermák / (Czech Republic) Lukáš Dlouhý, 6–4, 6–3

== Singles main draw entrants ==
=== Seeds ===
Country	Player	Rank^{1}	Seed
GER	Philipp Kohlschreiber	23	1
ARG	Juan Mónaco	30	2
ESP	Fernando Verdasco	32	3
AUT	Jürgen Melzer	34	4
ARG	Carlos Berlocq	43	5
~~ESP~~	~~Roberto Bautista-Agut~~	~~48~~	~~6~~
ESP	Albert Montañés	49	7
ESP	Marcel Granollers	51	8

- ^{1} Rankings are as of July 22, 2013

=== Other entrants ===
The following players received wildcards into the singles main draw:

- (Austria) Andreas Haider-Maurer
- (Croatia) Mate Pavić
- (Austria) Dominic Thiem

The following players received entry from the qualifying draw:

- (Austria) Martin Fischer
- (Czech Republic) Jan Hájek
- (Austria) Dennis Novak
- (Croatia) Antonio Veić

The following player received entry as a lucky loser:

- (Bosnia and Herzegovina) Aldin Šetkić

=== Withdrawals ===
Before the tournament

- (Spain) Pablo Andújar
- (Spain) Roberto Bautista-Agut (rib injury)
- (Argentina) Guido Pella
- (Serbia) Viktor Troicki (suspension)

=== Retirements ===
- (Argentina) Horacio Zeballos (right rib injury)

== Doubles main draw entrants ==
=== Seeds ===
Country	Player	Country	Player	Rank^{1}	Seed
CZE	František Čermák	CZE	Lukáš Dlouhý	78	1
ITA	Daniele Bracciali	SVK	Filip Polášek	88	2
AUT	Oliver Marach	ESP	Fernando Verdasco	103	3
GER	Martin Emmrich	GER	Christopher Kas	107	4

- Rankings are as of July 22, 2013

=== Other entrants ===
The following pairs received wildcards into the doubles main draw:

- (Germany) Carlos Becke / (Germany) Philipp Kohlschreiber
- (Austria) Gerald Melzer / (Austria) Jürgen Melzer
