= Judy Murray =

Scottish tennis coach (born 1959)

Judy Murray OBE
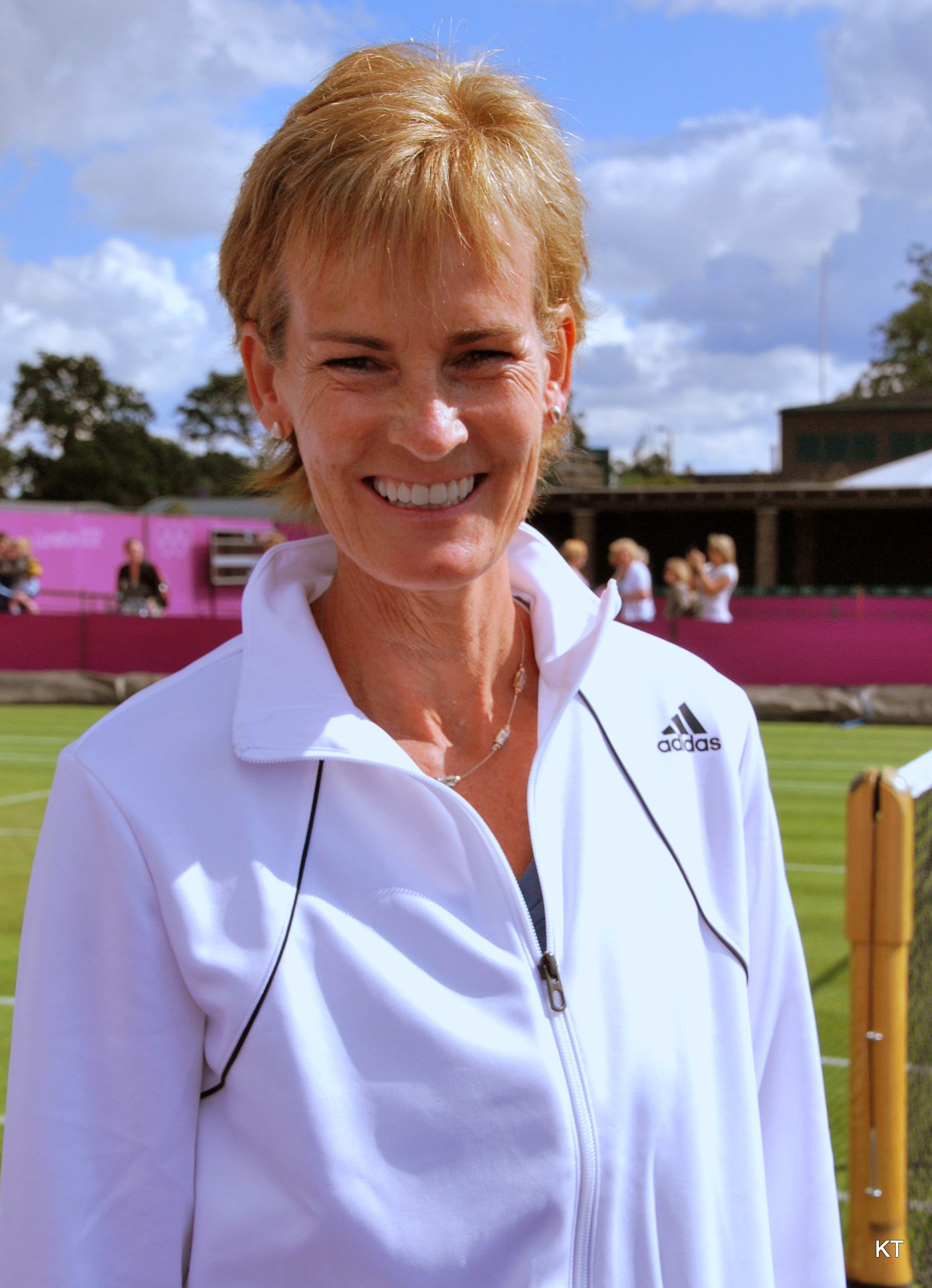
- Murray in 2012
- Born: Judith Mary Erskine; 8 September 1959 (age 67); Bridge of Allan, Stirlingshire, Scotland
- Education: University of Edinburgh
- Occupation: Tennis coach
- Spouse: William Murray (m. 1980; div. 2005)
- Children: Jamie Murray; Andy Murray
- Father: Roy Erskine

Judith Mary Murray (née Erskine; born 8 September 1959) is a Scottish tennis coach. She is the mother of professional tennis players Jamie and Sir Andy Murray.

== Life and career ==
Murray was born on 8 September 1959 in Bridge of Allan, Stirlingshire, the daughter of Alison Shirley (née Edney) and Roy Erskine, an optician and former footballer who had played for Stirling Albion in the 1950s. She says that growing up, there were no indoor tennis courts in Scotland, so she played tennis in the summer and badminton in the winter. She won 64 titles in Scotland during her junior and senior career, and decided to make an attempt at the professional tour in around 1976. Murray gave up the idea of competing professionally as she was homesick and was robbed in Barcelona. However, she had played against players such as Debbie Jevans and Mariana Simionescu.

Murray said that her playing style did not have any big shots, but she was quick around the court and read the game well. She decided to study French and German at the University of Edinburgh, before dropping German in favour of business studies. In 1981, she graduated from the University of Edinburgh and represented Great Britain at the World Student Games. She began coaching and was the initial coach for both her sons before handing over the reins as their professional careers bloomed. In the early 1980s, Murray lived in the West End of Glasgow and was a member of Broomhill Lawn Tennis and Squash club, winning the Club Championships three times and playing for its teams (under her maiden name).

Aside from her own sons, she has coached many players at regional and national level under the auspices of the British tennis governing body, the Lawn Tennis Association (LTA). In December 2011 she was elected to lead the British Fed Cup team as their captain. She said she took the job in part to raise the profile of female coaches and alleviate some of the sexism that she said remains in the sport. She resigned as Great Britain's Fed Cup Captain in March 2016.

Murray was appointed Officer of the Order of the British Empire (OBE) in the 2017 Birthday Honours for services to tennis, women in sport, and charity.

She is a trustee of the Judy Murray Foundation, a registered charity under Scots Law, with the object of improving access to tennis opportunities across Scotland.

In 2018, Murray appeared as a contestant on The Chase Celebrity Christmas Special.

In 2020, Murray appeared as a contestant on Celebrity Masterchef. Murray was given the 2021 Georgina Clark Mother Award from the Women's Tennis Association.

== Honorary doctorates ==
Murray was awarded an honorary doctorate by the University of Edinburgh on 8 October 2013. On 22 November 2013 Murray received an honorary doctorate from the University of Stirling. She received three honorary degrees in 2016 – one from the University of Aberdeen, another from the University of Glasgow, and a third from Abertay University for her "outstanding contribution to British sport."

== Park of Keir ==
Murray had been planning to build indoor and outdoor tennis courts; a six-hole golf course; a 4/5-star hotel; a country park; indoor leisure activities; a tennis museum and 19 resort homes on 110 hectares (270 acres) of green belt land at Park of Keir south of Dunblane and the north-west of Bridge of Allan. The proposed development was rejected by Stirling Council in December 2015. However, following appeal from the developers it was granted planning permission in principle by the Scottish government in December 2021. Despite this, the project was officially cancelled in August 2024, due to rising costs and protracted planning disputes.

== Strictly Come Dancing ==
On 7 September 2014 Murray was introduced as a competitor in the 12th series of BBC One's Strictly Come Dancing, paired with professional dancer Anton du Beke. In week eight at Blackpool, however, after dancing a Viennese Waltz to "Let's Go Fly a Kite" from Mary Poppins, the pair had one of the lowest two scores. They were eliminated by a unanimous vote from the judges. Writing in The Daily Telegraph, Michael Hogan tagged his review of the show "Ballroom justice at last as the popular but wooden Mrs Murray leaves Strictly", describing the last dance: "It was Murray’s best yet – not saying much, maybe – scoring her first (and only) sevens. She was even more delighted by her four from Craig Revel Horwood."

Week #	Dance/song	Judges' score				Total	Result
Week #	Dance/song	Horwood	Bussell	Goodman	Tonioli	Total	Result
1	Waltz / Mull of Kintyre	3	4	6	5	18	No elimination
2	Cha-Cha-Cha / She's a Lady	2	5	5	5	17	Safe
3	Quickstep / Don't Rain on My Parade	3	5, 5 (Note: Score from guest judge Donny Osmond)	5	5	23	Safe
4	Tango / "Jealousy"	4	6	6	6	22	Safe
5	Charleston / "Varsity Drag"	3	5	5	5	18	Safe
6	American Smooth / "Cruella de Vil"	3	6	6	5	20	Safe
7	Paso Doble / "I Fought the Law"	3	5	5	5	18	Safe
8	Viennese Waltz / "Let's Go Fly a Kite"	4	6	7	7	24	Eliminated

== Personal life ==
In 1980 when she was 21 she married William Murray, a manager with the Scottish newsagent chain RS McColl. They had two children, Jamie, born 1986, and Andy, born 1987. The couple divorced in 2005 after a nine year separation. She moved out, and the boys continued to live with their father.

In February 2021 Murray said that she had undergone a £4,500 non-surgical face lift after her sons teased her for her "turkey neck".

Murray has a tattoo of a large spider on her back. Explaining her motivation she said, "It's a throwback to the story of Robert the Bruce and the spider in the cave – it's about never giving up, resilience, persistence, fighting against the odds."

Her parents both died in the first few weeks of 2026.

== Publications ==
- Knowing the Score: My Family and Our Tennis Story. London: Chatto & Windus, 2017. Co-written with Alexandra Heminsley. ISBN 978-1784741792.
