= Roy Erskine =

Scottish footballer (1931–2026)

Personal information
- Date of birth: September 1931
- Date of death: 19 January 2026 (aged 94)
- Position: Full-back

Youth career
- Hibernian

Senior career*
Years	Team	Apps	(Gls)
	Hibernian	0	(0)
- Peebles Rovers
- Troon
1954–1956	Stirling Albion	9	(0)
1956–1958	Cowdenbeath	37	(0)
1958	Stirling Albion	0	(0)
Total		46+	(0+)
- * Club domestic league appearances and goals

Roy Erskine (September 1931 – 19 January 2026) was a Scottish professional footballer who played as a full-back, making 46 appearances in the Scottish Football League.

== Career ==
After completing his spell of national service, Erskine began his football career with Hibernian. He played in some first team matches, including an East of Scotland Shield Final, but never made a league appearance for the team. Erskine later played for Peebles Rovers, Stirling Albion and Cowdenbeath. He joined Stirling in August 1954 from Troon, and rejoined Stirling in 1958 briefly following a spell with Cowdenbeath.

== Personal life and death ==
Erksine was born in September 1931. An optician by profession, Erskine was the maternal grandfather of professional tennis players Jamie and Andy Murray by his daughter Judy. Erskine himself was a tennis player, but he was prohibited by the Scottish tennis authorities from continuing that sport actively after he became a professional footballer.

Erskine died on 19 January 2026, at the age of 94.
