= 2010 Ritro Slovak Open – Men's singles =

Men's singles
- 2010 Ritro Slovak Open

Final
- Champions: (Slovakia) Martin Kližan
- Runners-up: (Austria) Stefan Koubek
- Score: 7–6(4), 6–2

Events
Singles	men	women
Doubles	men	women
← 2009 ·	Ritro Slovak Open	· 2011 →

Michael Berrer was the defending champion but decided not to participate.
Martin Kližan won the final against Stefan Koubek 7–6(4), 6–2.

== Seeds ==
1. (Russia) Teymuraz Gabashvili (second round)
2. (Ukraine) Illya Marchenko (second round)
3. (France) Adrian Mannarino (first round)
4. (Poland) Michał Przysiężny (second round, retired due to a right shoulder injury)
5. (Slovakia) Lukáš Lacko (second round)
6. (Germany) Dustin Brown (first round)
7. (Slovenia) Blaž Kavčič (second round)
8. (Russia) Igor Kunitsyn (semifinals)

== Draw ==
Key

- Q = Qualifier
- WC = Wild card
- LL = Lucky loser
- Alt = Alternate
- ITF = ITF entry
- PR = Protected ranking
- SR = Special ranking
- SE = Special exempt
- JE = Junior exempt
- JR = Junior Accelerator Programme entrant
- CO = College Accelerator Programme entrant
- NG = Next Gen Accelerator Program entrant
- w/o = Walkover
- r = Retired
- d = Defaulted

=== Finals ===
Semifinals
8	(Russia) Igor Kunitsyn	3	1
(Austria) Stefan Koubek	6	6
(Russia) Alexandre Kudryavtsev	6	3	6^{5}
WC	(Slovakia) Martin Kližan	3	6	7

Final
(Austria) Stefan Koubek	6^{4}	2
WC	(Slovakia) Martin Kližan	7	6

=== Top half ===
First round
1	(Russia) T Gabashvili	6	7
(Spain) R Bautista-Agut	3	6^{10}
PR	(Czech Republic) J Vaněk	7	4	4
WC	(Slovakia) D Hrbatý	6^{5}	6	6
WC	(Slovakia) A Martin	6	6
Q	(Finland) T Nieminen	3	1
(Czech Republic) L Rosol	1	6	3
8	(Russia) I Kunitsyn	6	3	6
4	(Poland) M Przysiężny	6	6
(Spain) D Muñoz-De La Nava	3	2
(United States) R Ram	3	3
(Lithuania) R Berankis	6	6
(Romania) V Crivoi	4	1
(Austria) S Koubek	6	6
PR	(Canada) F Dancevic	6	3	4
5	(Slovakia) L Lacko	4	6	6

Second round
1	(Russia) T Gabashvili	6	4	4
WC	(Slovakia) D Hrbatý	3	6	6
WC	(Slovakia) A Martin	2	2
8	(Russia) I Kunitsyn	6	6
4	(Poland) M Przysiężny	4	1	r
(Lithuania) R Berankis	6	3
(Austria) S Koubek	6	7
5	(Slovakia) L Lacko	4	6^{2}

Quarterfinals
WC	(Slovakia) D Hrbatý	4	7	6^{2}
8	(Russia) I Kunitsyn	6	5	7
(Lithuania) R Berankis	3	6	3
(Austria) S Koubek	6	1	6

Semifinals
8	(Russia) I Kunitsyn	3	1
(Austria) S Koubek	6	6

=== Bottom half ===
First round
7	(Slovenia) B Kavčič	6
(Hungary) A Balázs	0	r
(Italy) S Bolelli	7	5	5
WC	(Slovakia) M Semjan	6^{2}	7	7
Q	(Slovakia) M Mečíř Jr.	1	6	6
SE	(United Kingdom) J Ward	6	3	4
(Russia) A Kudryavtsev	6	6
3	(France) A Mannarino	3	4
6	(Germany) D Brown	6	6^{9}	3
Q	(United States) R Harrison	4	7	6
(Czech Republic) J Pospíšil	4	7	4
WC	(Slovakia) M Kližan	6	5	6
(Switzerland) M Chiudinelli	3	3
Q	(Russia) M Ledovskikh	6	6
(Switzerland) S Bohli	0	r
2	(Ukraine) I Marchenko	2

Second round
7	(Slovenia) B Kavčič	3	6^{4}
WC	(Slovakia) M Semjan	6	7
Q	(Slovakia) M Mečíř Jr.	4	2
(Russia) A Kudryavtsev	6	6
Q	(United States) R Harrison	6	3	6^{6}
WC	(Slovakia) M Kližan	1	6	7
Q	(Russia) M Ledovskikh	7	7
2	(Ukraine) I Marchenko	6^{5}	5

Quarterfinals
WC	(Slovakia) M Semjan	5	6	3
(Russia) A Kudryavtsev	7	4	6
WC	(Slovakia) M Kližan	6	6
Q	(Russia) M Ledovskikh	2	4

Semifinals
(Russia) A Kudryavtsev	6	3	6^{5}
WC	(Slovakia) M Kližan	3	6	7
