= Jamie Murray =

British tennis player (born 1986)

Jamie Murray OBE
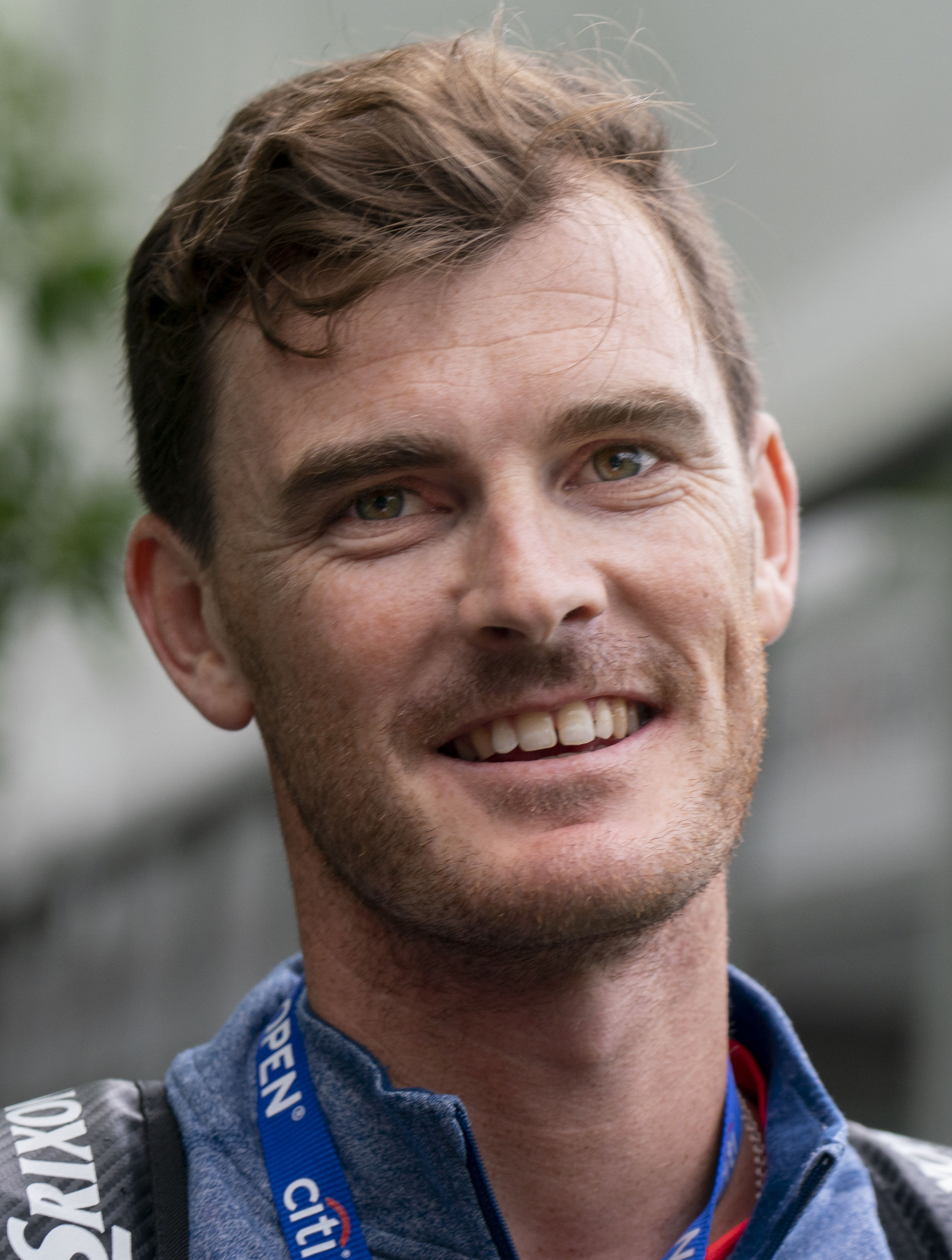
- Jamie Murray at the 2018 Washington Open
- Country (sports): (United Kingdom) Great Britain; Scotland
- Residence: London, England
- Born: 13 February 1986 (age 40) Glasgow, Scotland
- Height: 1.91 m (6 ft 3 in)
- Turned pro: 2004
- Retired: 2026
- Plays: Left-handed (two handed-backhand)
- Coach: Louis Cayer (2006–2026); Alan MacDonald
- Prize money: US $7,108,049

Singles
- Career record: 0–1
- Career titles: 0
- Highest ranking: No. 834 (22 May 2006)

Doubles
- Career record: 589–430
- Career titles: 34
- Highest ranking: No. 1 (4 April 2016)

Grand Slam doubles results
- Australian Open: W (2016)
- French Open: QF (2017, 2020)
- Wimbledon: F (2015)
- US Open: W (2016)

Other doubles tournaments
- Tour Finals: SF (2016, 2017, 2018)
- Olympic Games: 2R (2008, 2020)

Mixed doubles
- Career record: 79–40
- Career titles: 5

Grand Slam mixed doubles results
- Australian Open: F (2020)
- French Open: SF (2011)
- Wimbledon: W (2007, 2017)
- US Open: W (2017, 2018, 2019)

Other mixed doubles tournaments
- Olympic Games: 1R (2016)

Team competitions
- Davis Cup: W (2015)

James Robert Murray OBE (born 13 February 1986) is a British former professional tennis player. A doubles specialist, he is a seven-time major doubles champion (five in mixed doubles and two in men's doubles), a Davis Cup winner, and a former doubles world No. 1. He is the older brother of former singles world No. 1, Andy Murray. Murray had an early career partnership with Eric Butorac, winning three titles in 2007. His following seven ATP finals came with six different partners. In 2013, he began a new partnership with John Peers, winning six ATP tournaments, and reaching two Grand Slam finals. After this partnership ended, Murray played alongside Bruno Soares from 2016, with the new pair enjoying almost immediate success after winning only their second ATP tournament together. They went on to win the 2016 Australian Open and US Open, and Murray became world No. 1 in April that year, spending nine weeks at the top of the rankings. He and Soares split in 2019, with Murray competing alongside compatriot Neal Skupski until the end of 2020, winning one ATP title together. He then reunited with Soares, with the pair finishing runners-up at the 2021 US Open.Murray was part of the Great Britain team that won the 2015 Davis Cup, the nation's first victory in the tournament for 79 years. He and his brother recorded crucial doubles victories in Britain's quarterfinal, semifinal and final wins. The Davis Cup team was awarded the 2015 BBC Sports Personality Team of the Year Award. Murray has also competed at the Summer Olympics on four occasions. Brad Gilbert, who coached Andy Murray, nicknamed Jamie 'Stretch' because of his 6-foot-3-inch height and long arms.

== Early and personal life ==
Jamie Murray was born in Glasgow, Scotland, the elder son of Judith (née Erskine) and William Murray. He grew up in Dunblane and attended Dunblane Primary School. Jamie is the elder brother of fellow tennis player and former singles world No. 1, Andy Murray. He and his brother were present during the 1996 Dunblane school massacre, when Thomas Hamilton killed 16 children and a teacher before shooting himself. Both brothers were part of a group of pupils who took cover in a classroom. His parents separated in 1998, with the boys living with their father while being mentored in tennis by their mother.

At the age of 10, Jamie was No 3-ranked tennis player of his age in Europe. At 11 years and 5 months, he finished runner-up in the boys under 12 category at the prestigious Junior Orange Bowl. Murray was the junior world number 2 when he was 13 years old and was selected to be educated at The Leys School in Cambridge with four other boys whilst being trained by national coaches. But being the youngest meant that instead of Leys, he went to St Faith's School down the road, which was a feeder school. He was isolated from the other players and the coaching wasn't to his liking, so after eight months he returned home. He has not criticised the coach in charge, and stated that blaming the Lawn Tennis Association (LTA) would be an easy option. Back home, he did not touch a tennis racquet for two years.

In 2004, he partnered his brother to the semifinal of the Junior US Open. Jamie and Andy call each other 'Tight' as a nickname. Murray said that André Sá is probably his best friend on the tour.

Murray supports Hibernian F.C. and Manchester United F.C. His maternal grandfather, Roy Erskine, is a retired professional footballer who played reserve team matches for Hibernian and in the Scottish Football League for Stirling Albion and Cowdenbeath.

In 2009, Jamie began dating Alejandra Gutiérrez, a Colombian MBA student. They married in Cromlix House near Dunblane on 28 October 2010, with brother Andy acting as best man; Andy would later buy and refurbish the struggling hotel, and both he and their father Willie also subsequently celebrated their wedding receptions at the venue. Jamie and Alejandra Murray share two children and divorced on August 22, 2025, having separated the previous year.

== Career ==
=== 2005–2010 ===
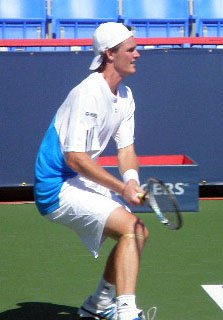
Murray in 2007

Murray partnered Colin Fleming, winning their first Futures tournament on 4 September 2005 at the Great Britain F10 in Nottingham. Murray/Fleming won Futures titles at Glasgow, Edinburgh and Exmouth, amassing a total of four Futures plus four satellite titles.

In October 2005, they made their debut at an ATP Challenger tournament in Southampton. The duo won their first round match but were defeated in the quarterfinals. Murray also played in the singles tournament draw in which he won the first qualifying round match but lost the second qualifying. That year, Murray also partnered Ross Hutchins, to win Futures in Bolton and Maïder Laval in Rimouski, Quebec

In November 2005, Murray was part of the Scotland team in the inaugural Aberdeen Cup against England. This was an exhibition tournament, and the first time that Jamie and his brother Andy Murray played doubles as seniors. Murray also played singles, and mixed doubles with Elena Baltacha. Scotland defeated England 4 1/2– 2 1/2. In January 2006, Murray partnered Fleming in the Wrexham Challenger where they ended as runners-up after losing in the final to French duo Jean-François Bachelot and Stéphane Robert 6-4, 7-5. In February, Murray and Fleming played together in the Wolfsburg Challenger where they reached the quarterfinals. In April, Murray partnered Israeli Dudi Sela in the Santa Clarita Challenger where they lost in the first round. Murray also played the León Challenger, this time with fellow Briton Jamie Delgado where they lost in the first round. In May, he returned to action, this time with Australian Alun Jones in the Men's Pro Challenger at Tunica National where they reached the second round. In June, he played with Fleming in the Surbiton Trophy where they lost in the first round against Mardy Fish and Jeff Morrison. That month, Murray made his debut in an ATP Tour tournament at the 2006 Nottingham Open partnering with his brother Andy. The siblings had to retire in the first round due to Jamie's injury when they were 0-4 down to Stan Wawrinka and Justin Gimelstob. Murray and Colin Fleming's success gained them a wildcard into the main draw of the men's doubles at the 2006 Wimbledon Championships, though they lost in the first round against Lucky Losers Zack Fleishman and Robert Smeets. Colin Fleming decided to quit the tour to return to the University of Stirling to complete his degree.

In July, Murray and Fleming reached the final of the Shelbourne Irish Open where they were defeated 6-3, 2-6, [10-8] against Jasper Smit and Martijn van Haasteren. That same month, the Murray brothers played together again at the Newport Hall of Fame Tennis Championships where they lost in the first round against Igor Kunitsyn and Danai Udomchoke. Murray stayed in the U.S. to play the Comerica Bank Challenger with American Mirko Pehar where they reached the semifinals. Murray and American player Eric Butorac, playing together for the first time, reached the final of the Los Angeles ATP tournament which they lost in straight sets to the world's top-ranked doubles team, the Bryan brothers. The pair came to be known as Booty and Stretch, putting their nicknames on the back of their shirts. Murray finished the month playing the Vancouver Open with Fleming, where their lost in the quarterfinals.

In August, Murray continued to make progress. He and Fleming reached the final of the Levene Gouldin & Thompson Tennis Challenger, where they lost to 7-5, 5-7, [10-3] against Scott Lipsky and David Martin. Murray ended his North American tour playing the GHI Bronx Tennis Classic with Chilean Paul Capdeville, where they lost in the quarterfinals. That same month, Murray won the Como Challenger along with Jamie Delgado, after beating Romanians Victor Crivoi and Gabriel Moraru in the final 6–2, 4–6, [10–7]. In September, the British duo remained in Italy to play the Genoa Open Challenger, where they lost in the final 6-4, 4-6, [13-11] against Adriano Biasella and Marcelo Charpentier. At the end of the month, Murray reached the final of the Bangkok ATP tournament with his brother Andy, losing to the top Israeli doubles pairing, Andy Ram and Jonathan Erlich. In October, the brothers played together the Tokyo ATP tournament, where they reached the second round after losing to eventual runners-up Paul Goldstein and Jim Thomas. Jamie returned to play Challenger tournaments partnering with Delgado in the Nottingham Challenge, where they lost in the final 6-4, 4-6, [10-7] against Filip Prpic and Nicolas Tourte. In the Lambertz Open he switched partnership and played with Australian Jordan Kerr, where they reached the semifinals.

In November, Murray continued to play with Kerr and the duo reached the final of the Slovak Open (where they lost 7-5, 6-3 against Butorac and Travis Parrott) and the quarterfinals of the PEOPLEnet Cup. At the end of the month, the Aberdeen Cup was held for the second time. Playing for Scotland, Murray participated in the singles, doubles with Andy, and mixed doubles with Elena Baltacha. Scotland won 6 1/2–1.

In January 2007, the Murray brothers reached the semifinals of the Qatar Open where they lost to eventual winners Mikhail Youzhny and Nenad Zimonjić. In early February, Murray played with Butorac to claim their first doubles title in the AT&T Dallas Challenger after defeating Americans Rajeev Ram and Bobby Reynolds. They then won back to back doubles titles on the ATP Tour, at the Pacific Coast Championships in San Jose defeating Chris Haggard and Rainer Schüttler 7–5, 7–6^{(8–6)} in the final and the Regions Morgan Keegan Championships at the Racquet Club of Memphis winning 7–5, 6–3 against Julian Knowle and Jürgen Melzer. Murray remained in the U.S. to play the Tennis Open in Las Vegas. This time, his partner was Australian Ashley Fisher and they reached the semifinals. These victories lifted Murray into the top 50 in the ATP doubles rankings for the first time. In March, Murray returned with Butorac to play the Indian Wells Masters, where they lost in the second round, and in the Miami Open, where they lost in the first round.

In April 2007, Murray received his first call-up to the Great Britain Davis Cup team, where he was picked for the doubles rubber in the Europe/Africa Zone Group I tie against the Netherlands. Jamie played alongside Greg Rusedski, beating Robin Haase and Rogier Wassen. After the match, Rusedski announced his retirement on court. Murray then played the Valencia Open with Butorac, where they lost in the quarterfinals. That month, he played with his brother Andy the Monte Carlo Masters, where they retired in the first round due to Andy's back injury. Murray partnered again with Butorac in the Barcelona Open and the Estoril Open, where they both lost in the first round. In May, Murray and Butorac continued to prepare for the clay season and played the Hypo Group Tennis International in Pörtschach where they reached the quarterfinals. Murray made it debut at the French Open men's doubles draw but the duo lost in the first round. In June, Murray and Butorac started the grass season playing at the Queen's Club Championships, where they lost in the quarterfinals. The next week, the duo participated in the Nottingham Open seeded as number 3. Murray and Butorac were the eventual winners of the tournament after defeating the British duo of Joshua Goodall and Ross Hutchins by 4–6, 6–3, [10–5]. With this positive result, the duo went on to the Wimbledon Championships. However, they went out in the third round after losing against Czech duo of Lukáš Dlouhý and Pavel Vízner. Nevertheless, Murray was successful in the mixed doubles partnering with Jelena Janković. Murray had met Janković at a party in Miami in 2006, where she was unaware that he played tennis. Murray's agent subsequently asked her if she would like to play mixed doubles with him at Wimbledon. She had made no decision until they arrived at the All England Club. At the same time, the day before the tournament started and Murray asked again, when she agreed. They won the Mixed Doubles title at Wimbledon, Murray becoming the first Briton to win a Wimbledon title for 20 years. Great Britain's last Wimbledon winners were Jeremy Bates and Jo Durie in 1987, also in the Mixed Doubles.

In July 2007, Murray and Butorac started the hard court season at the Countrywide Classic, where they lost in the first round, then played in the Indianapolis Tennis Championships, losing in the quarterfinals, and in the Legg Mason Tennis Classic, where they were out in the first round. In August, Murray continued his preparation for the US Open. First, he played the Canadian Open in Montreal partnering with American James Blake (losing in the first round), then took part in the Cincinnati Masters with Indian Mahesh Bhupathi (where they lost in the second round), and lastly he played the New Haven Open with Australian Jordan Kerr (losing in the semifinals). Since Memphis tournament in February, Murray and Butorac only went past the quarterfinals of a tournament once. In August, they agreed an amicable split, but decided to play together the US Open, where they lost in the second round. As for the mixed doubles, Murray reached the semifinal alongside Liezel Huber, coming within ten points of winning a place in the final.

In September 2007, Murray was selected for the Davis Cup World Group Play-off against Croatia. Murray played the doubles with Tim Henman beating Marin Čilić and Lovro Zovko. Great Britain won 4-1 and were promoted to the World Group. In October, Murray returned to action with his younger brother Andy in the Moselle Open. The eventually lost in the second round. The next week, he partnered Kerr in the Vienna Open, where they were defeated in the first round. The next week, Murray went on to play the Madrid Open with Bahamian Mark Knowles, where they were the number 8 seeds. However, they lost in the second round to Polish duo of Mariusz Fyrstenberg and Marcin Matkowski. Late in that month, Murray played the Grand Prix de Tennis de Lyon with Kerr but they lost in the quarterfinals. Murray participated in the Paris Masters, his last tournament of the season, with his brother Andy. The brothers lost in the first round against Kerr and André Sá. Murray lost his singles ranking this year.

Murray began 2008 with his new doubles partner Max Mirnyi, but the partnership struggled. Despite victory in the Delray Beach International Tennis Championships in February, they had failed to reach any other finals, winning just one of their first four matches as a pair and exiting eleven tournaments within the first two rounds, including at the 2008 Australian Open. Without Mirnyi, Murray has appeared to have had more success, reaching the semi-final of the Movistar Open with Nicolás Lapentti in January and final of the Estoril Open with Kevin Ullyett in April. Murray still showed some interest in singles tennis. He competed in a singles qualifying match against Marcel Granollers in January and applied for a wildcard singles entry for Wimbledon. He was given a wildcard into the qualifying stages for the Queen's Club Championships, but lost to Poland's Łukasz Kubot and was refused entry into the Wimbledon singles tournament. Whilst Murray enjoyed singles, he also thought the Davis Cup team would stand in good stead to have another member with recent singles experience, but he now accepted that he would henceforth only be a doubles player. With Mirnyi, he reached the final and semi-final of the Slazenger Open and Artois Championships respectively, but failed to progress beyond the third round of Wimbledon.

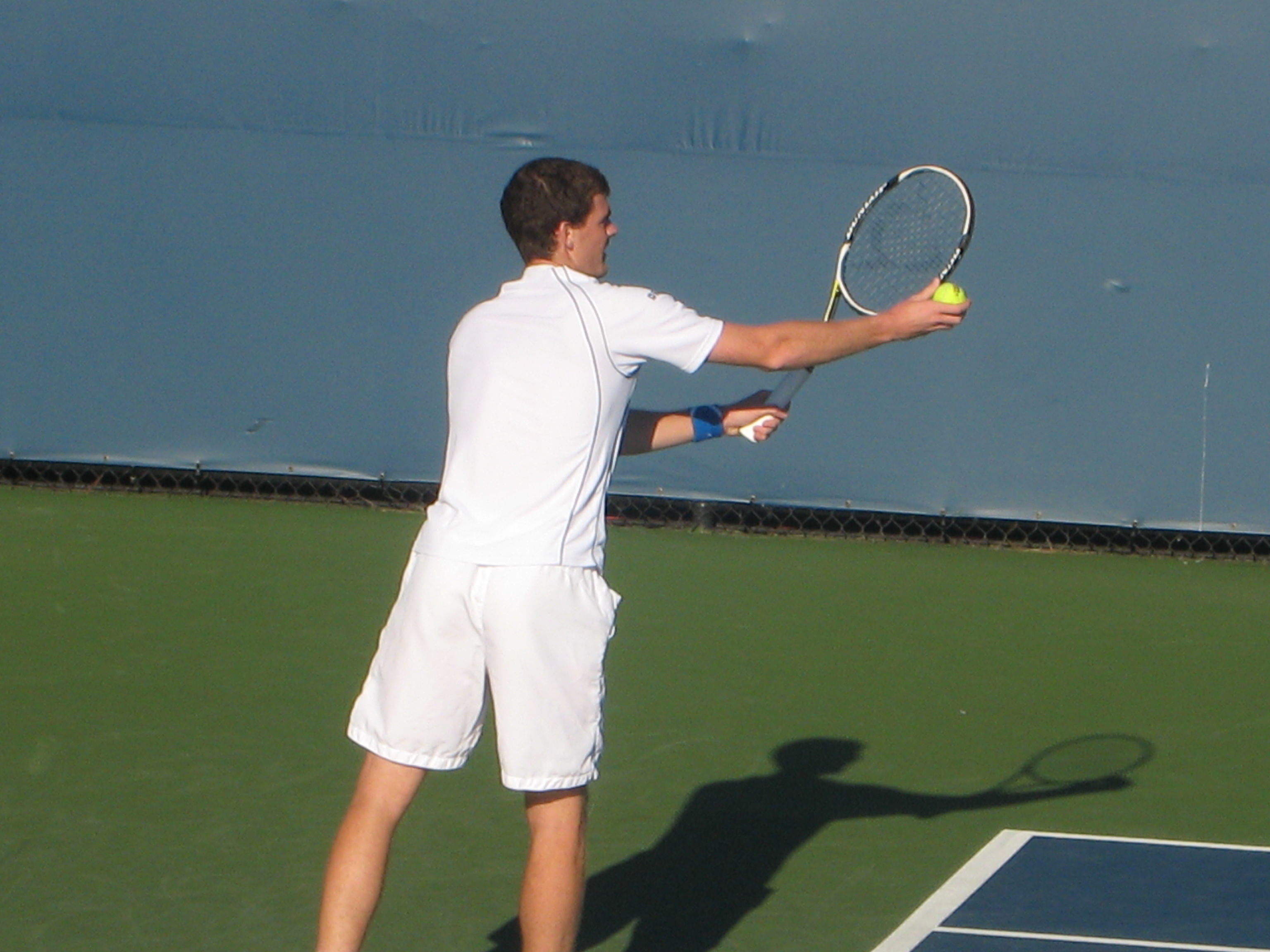
Murray at the 2008 Pilot Pen Tennis tournament

Murray had a public fall out with brother Andy Murray, criticising him for dropping out of the World Group first round tie against Argentina over fears he could aggravate a knee injury. Jamie played in and lost the doubles match with Ross Hutchins. Great Britain eventually lost 4–1. This was Great Britain's first World Group match since 2003, now facing a relegation play-off with Austria. The Murrays would not speak to each other for two weeks.

At the Olympic Games, the two Murrays competed together in the doubles tournament. After defeating Canadian pair Frédéric Niemeyer and Daniel Nestor in the first Round, they then lost to the French pair, Arnaud Clément and Michaël Llodra, in straight sets. The Davis Cup captain John Lloyd said he watched the Murrays doubles at the Olympics, and it was clear they were not getting on.

Mixed doubles once again proved to be more successful for Murray in 2008. Competing with Liezel Huber, he reached the final of the 2008 US Open, though they lost to Cara Black and Leander Paes. He also reached the semi-finals of Wimbledon and quarter-finals of Roland Garros. Seven months after the Davis Cup Argentina match, the Murray brothers prepared for the tie against Austria, with Andy declaring that he had healed the rift with Jamie. Andy won his singles matches, but Jamie and Ross Hutchins lost the doubles. Great Britain eventually lost their World Group play-off to Austria 3-2 and were relegated to Europe/Africa Zone Group 1.

Mirnyi and Murray had mediocre results, compiling a 15–17 record. They split in September 2008, and Murray formed a new partnership with Dušan Vemić of Serbia at the start of the 2009 season. In November 2008, Murray finished the season partnering Jamie Delgado. They played in the Slovak Open (where they were defeated in the quarterfinals), the PEOPLEnet Cup (where they lost in the first round) and the IPP Open (where they were defeated in the first round).

In 2009, Murray played the Brisbane and Sydney tournaments with Vemić but played the Australian Open with his old partner Eric Butorac as Vemić was unavailable. Butorac and Murray, who had not played together since the 2007 US Open, lost in the first round at Melbourne Park. Since splitting from Vemić at the end of February, Murray played with several different partners, including Simon Aspelin, Jamie Delgado (playing together the Status Athens Open), Paul Hanley (playing together the Zagorka Cup and the Tunis Open), Pavel Vízner (playing together the Zagreb Open, Gilles Müller and Jonathan Erlich. With Müller he reached the semi-final at Nottingham, his best result since the same tournament last year.

Murray played with Vízner at the French Open and with Erlich at Wimbledon, but was defeated in the first round of both tournaments. However, he did reach the semifinals of the mixed doubles at Wimbledon with his regular partner Liezel Huber. Dropping out of the world top one hundred, Murray returned to the Challenger circuit with new partner Jamie Delgado playing in the Poznań Open. The British duo returned to the ATP Tour to play the Umag Open, where they were defeated in the first round. This was the last top level tournament Murray played in the season. Once he started playing in the lower ranked tournaments, he took part in the San Marino Open and the Zucchetti Kos Tennis Cup. However, he only won his first tournament of any sort in eighteen months at the Tirani Cup in August 2009. He then participated in the Savoldi–Cò – Trofeo Dimmidisì followed by victory at the TEAN International (with Jonathan Marray). Murray returned to action with Delgado at the Banja Luka Challenger and became champions of the Ljubljana Open. The pair then went on to play at the Ethias Trophy and the Købstædernes ATP Challenger, where they lost both times in the first round. He was a semifinalist at Open d'Orléans. In November, partnering Jonathan Marray, Murray went on to win the President's Cup. Murray finished the season at the Slovak Open, being defeated in the first round.

=== 2010–2015 ===
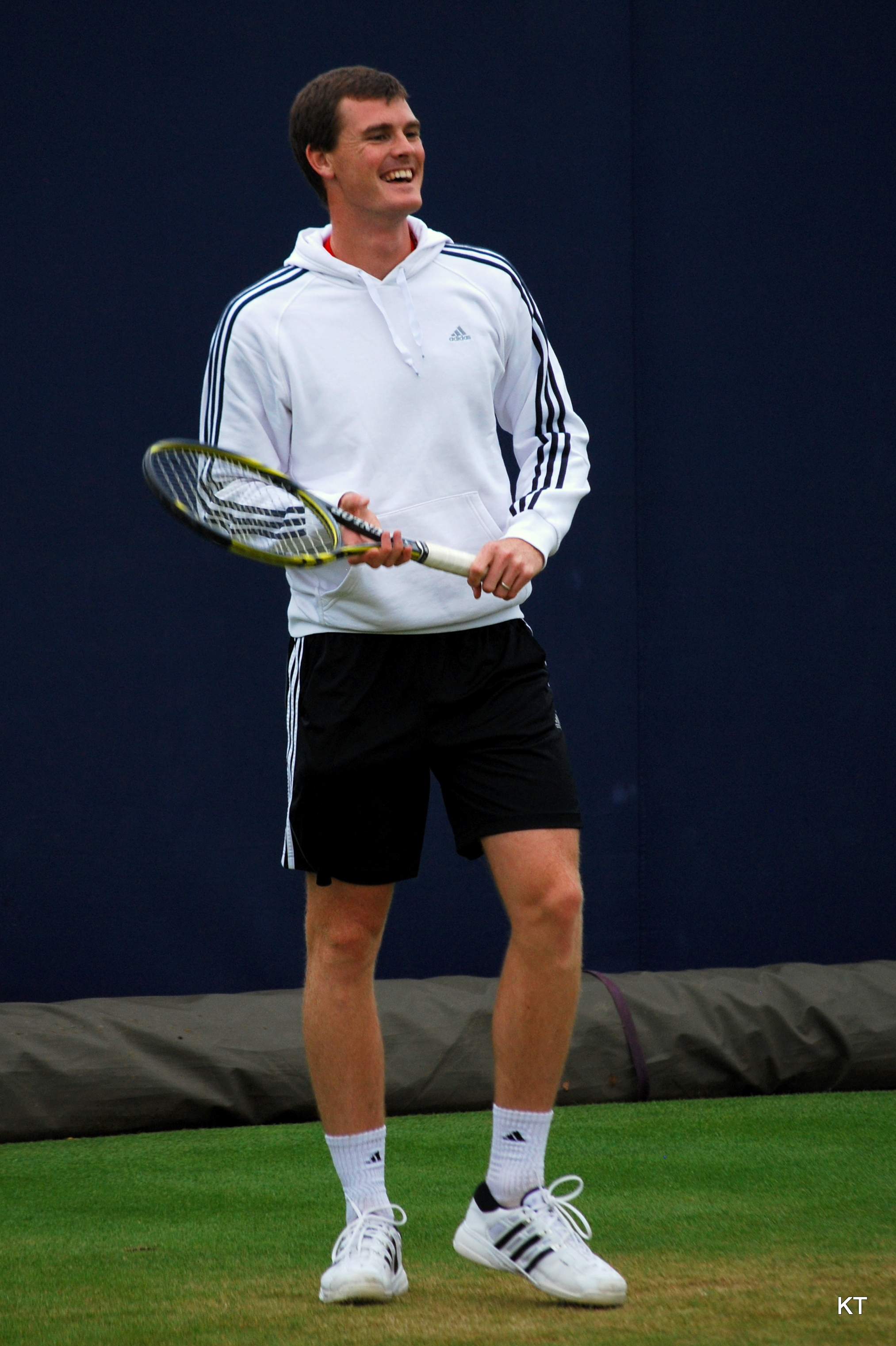
Jamie Murray at 2011 Aegon Championships

Jamie played regularly with fellow Briton Jonathan Marray. He started the 2010 year as a semifinalist in the ATP Challenger event in the Prime Cup Aberto de São Paulo with Jonathan Marray. His first win of the year came in Salinas, Ecuador. He lost in another Challenger event in the Open Bucaramanga on clay in the quarterfinals. Murray played his first ATP tournament of the season at the Zagreb Indoors but was defeated in the first round. He returned to Challenger tournaments and won the Internazionali di Tennis di Bergamo. Murray took part in the Serbia Challenger Open, the Cherbourg Challenger, the Morocco Tennis Tour – Marrakech, the Jersey International, the Open Prévadiès Saint–Brieuc, the Soweto Open, the Status Athens Open and the Ixian Grand Aegean Tennis Cup with no major success other than being runners-up of the latter tournament as well as the Jersey International.

Murray returned to play an ATP tournament at the 2010 Serbia Open but lost in the first round. He then went back to Challenger tournaments by playing the Trofeo Paolo Corazzi. He then went on to participate in the second Grand Slam of the season, the French Open, but lost in the first round. Murray started to prepare the grass season at the Queen's Club Championships losing in the second round. He then played the Eastbourne International but lost in the first round. At the Wimbledon Championships, Murray received a wildcard but was defeated in the first round. He also competed in the mixed doubles, alongside Laura Robson, but also lost in the first round.

At the 2010 Commonwealth Games in Delhi, he competed for Scotland. Playing singles, he was beaten by England's James Ward in the second round; partnering Colin Fleming in the doubles, they lost in the first round. Playing in his first tournament since getting married, Murray played with his brother Andy Murray. The pair had a great week in Valencia and won the tournament. This was Jamie's first win on the top level of the tour for over two years and the first time that he has won a doubles title with his brother. Murray ended the season with another Challenger win, in Bratislava.

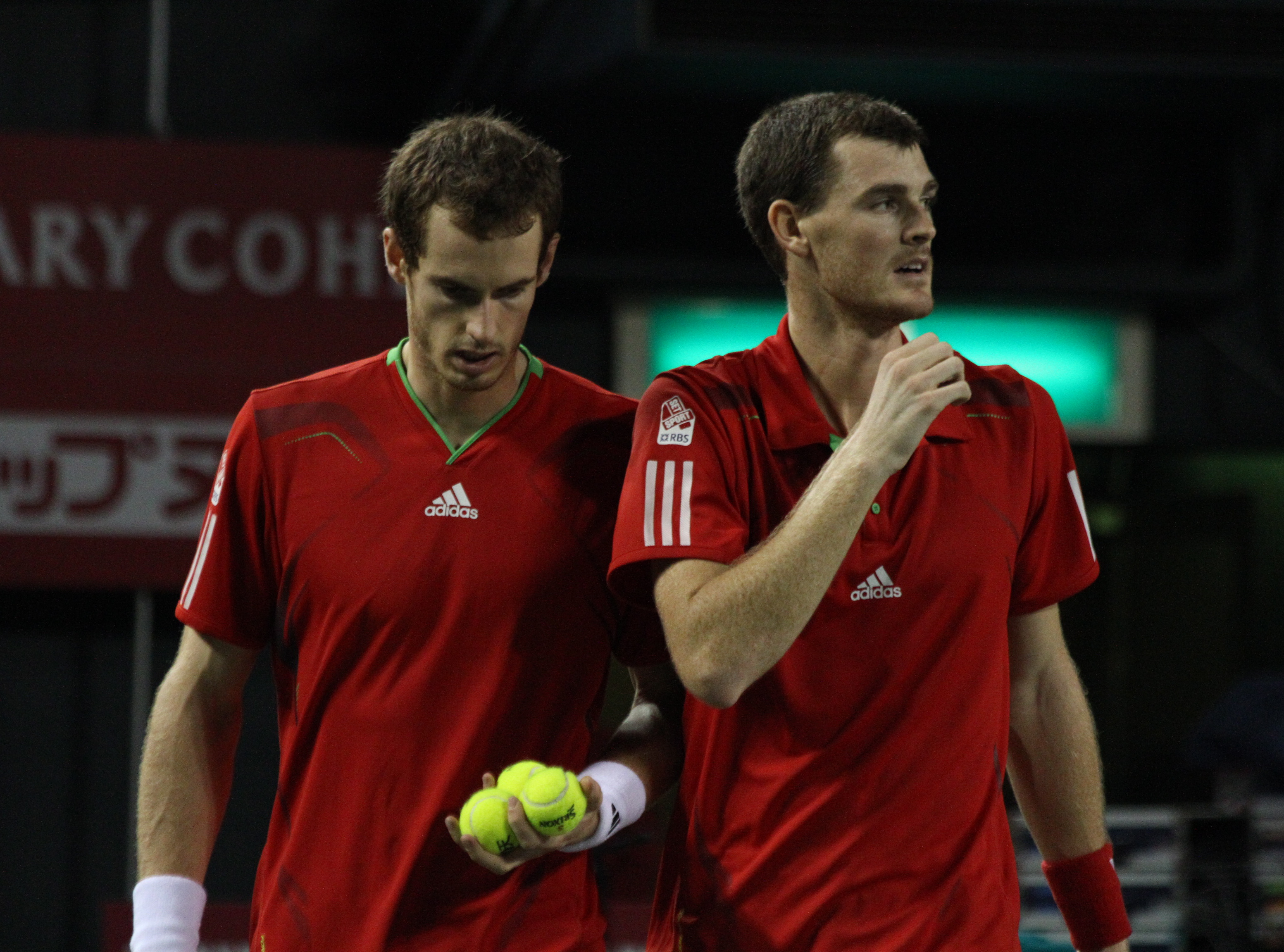
Jamie with his brother Andy at the 2011 Japan Open Tennis Championships

Murray began 2011 playing with Xavier Malisse. Though the pair lost in their first ATP event at Chennai, Murray won his first match at a Grand Slam since Wimbledon 2008 as they progressed to the second round of the Australian Open. Murray followed this up with two semi-final appearances, partnering Alexander Peya at the SA Open and his brother Andy at Rotterdam. These successes saw Murray climb back into the world top 50. At the French Open, Murray and his partner Chris Guccione were eliminated in the second round of the men's doubles by the top-seeded Bryans, but he progressed to the semi-finals of the mixed doubles with Nadia Petrova. In August, he reached the semi-finals of the Winston–Salem Open but lost in straight sets to Christopher Kas and Alexander Peya. He partnered Santiago González. At the US Open, he and partner González went out in the first round in straight sets to Jürgen Melzer and Philipp Petzschner, who went on to win the tournament. He next played at the Open de Moselle, where he partnered André Sá, going on to win the tournament by defeating Lukáš Dlouhý and Marcelo Melo in the final, winning in straight sets. Two weeks later, he won his second title of the year partnering with brother Andy Murray at the Rakuten Japan Open Tennis Championships. They defeated František Čermák and Filip Polášek. In doing so, he rose to a career-high doubles ranking of no. 23 in the world.

Murray began 2012 playing at the Brisbane International partnering Paul Hanley for the first time. They made it into the second round, but lost in straight sets. At the Australian Open the pair lost in the first round in three sets to Julian Knowle and Michael Kohlmann. Murray got to his first final of the season again partnering Paul Hanley at the Open Sud de France, but lost the final to Nicolas Mahut and Édouard Roger-Vasselin in straight sets. At the French Open, Murray, this time partnering Carsten Ball, lost in the first round to Yen-Hsun Lu and Go Soeda in three sets. At Wimbledon, Murray re-partnered with longtime partner Eric Butorac for the first time in five years. They went out in the second round in straight sets to Arnaud Clément and Michaël Llodra. Having lost in the first round at the German Open, Murray next competed at the London 2012 Summer Olympics in the doubles event partnering Brother Andy, who was also competing in the singles event. Jamie described partnering his brother at the London Olympics as a dream come true. Colin Fleming and Ross Hutchins also competed together to represent Great Britain in the doubles event. Unfortunately, the dream was not long lived as they lost in the first round to Austria (Melzer/Peya) in a very close three-setter. At the 2012 US Open, Murray had another disappointing campaign as he and partner André Sá lost in the first round to fifteenth seeds Peya/Soares in straight sets. They did, however, go on to reach the final of a challenger in Pétange the following week. The pair didn't go on to achieve much more in the remainder of the 2012 season, their most notable result coming at the Erste Bank Open where they reached the semi-finals. Murray then spent the final month of the season playing with a variety of different partners on the Challenger Tour.

Murray began 2013 playing with fellow Scot, Colin Fleming. Their first tournament was the Brisbane International where they were only able to make the quarter-finals despite being second seeds. They followed this up with a poor showing at the Australian Open where they lost their opening match to Kohlmann/Nieminen in straight sets. Murray was close to sliding out of the doubles top 100 and contemplated quitting the sport altogether. At the start of February 2013, Murray paired up with John Peers. This partnership looked to be more successful as they reached the semi-finals of their first tournament together, the Open Sud de France. They continued playing together and won their first title of the year at the US Men's Clay Court Championship, upsetting the top-seeded Bryan brothers in the final.

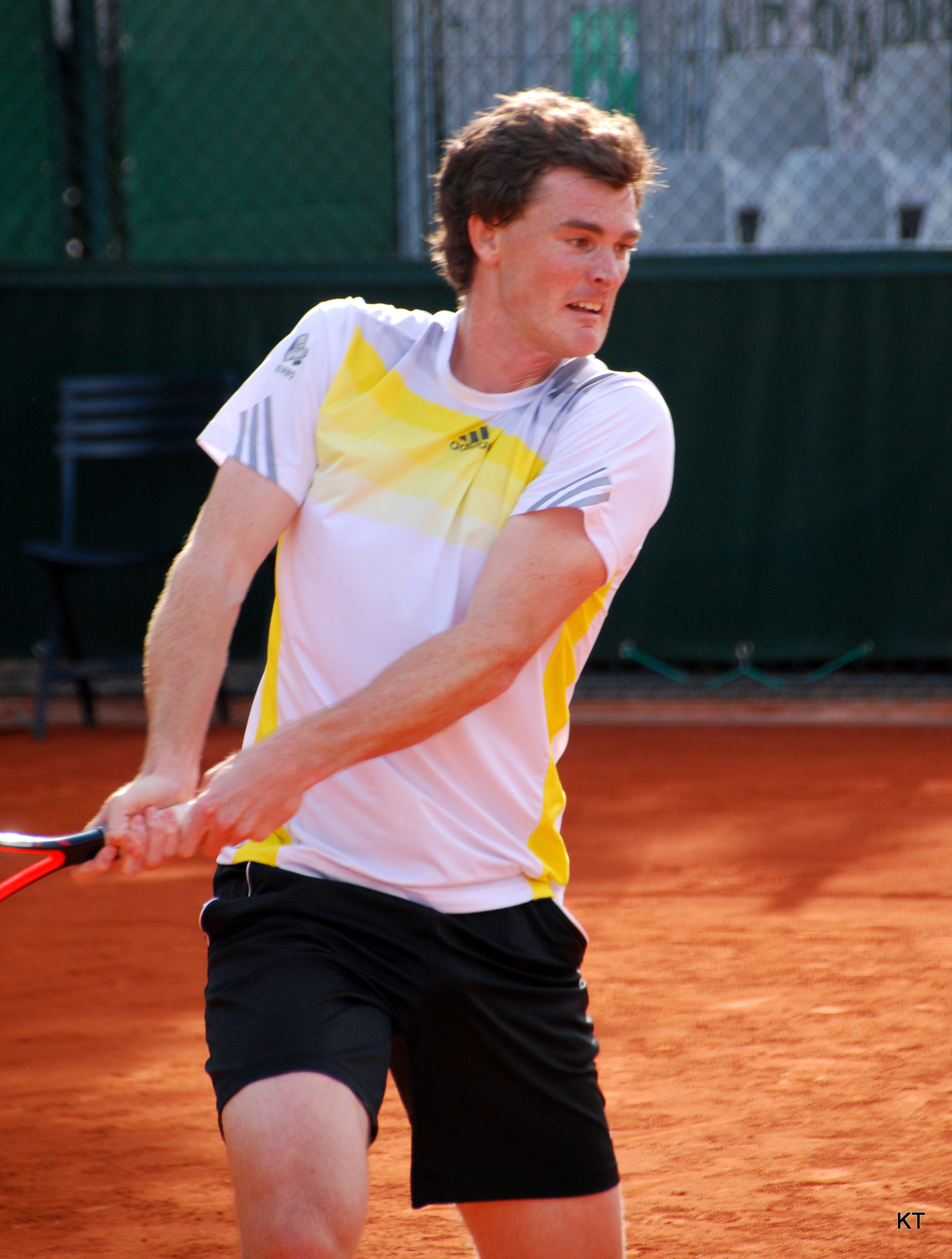
Murray in 2013

The pair played their first Grand Slam together at the French Open where they lost in the second round in three sets to the Colombian pairing of Cabal/Farah. Going out early allowed them to play in the Aegon Trophy on the Challenger Tour during the second week of the slam which they went on to win. They followed this with a fairly successful grass court season where they reached the quarter-finals of the Aegon Championships and the semi-finals of the Aegon International. This gave them confidence heading into Wimbledon, however they lost in the first round to Blake/Melzer in a match where the deciding set finished 14–12 after lasting 87 minutes. Not disheartened, Murray/Peers won their second ATP Tour title of the year only a few weeks later in Gstaad, beating the Spanish pair of Andújar/García-López in the final. They followed this up with a strong showing at the Bet-at-home Cup where they reached the semi-finals.

Next up was the US Open. The pair faced ninth seeds Marrero/Verdasco in their opening match and pulled off a shock, winning in straight sets. Two narrow three set wins followed over López/Sá as well as the American pairing of Baker/Ram. This resulted in Murray reaching his first ever Grand Slam quarter-final in the men's doubles. Murray/Peers would not progress any further, losing to second seeds Peya/Soares. Murray/Peers had a highly successful Asian swing of tournaments, reaching back-to-back finals in Bangkok and Tokyo, winning the former against Bednarek/Brunström. In Shanghai, Murray reached only his second Masters 1000 semi-final, defeating established doubles champions Julien Benneteau, Nenad Zimonjic and Robert Lindstedt en route before losing in two tightly contested tiebreaks against Marrero/Verdasco. As a result of their successful first season as a pair, Murray/Peers finished 10th in the Race to London, only 665 points behind the 8th placed qualifiers.

In November, the Lawn Tennis Association announced a dramatic cut in elite player funding with all financial support withdrawn from Britain's doubles specialists and any singles players aged over 24 to reduce the number of supported players from 16 this year to just six in 2014.

Murray started the 2014 year at Brisbane International with regular partner John Peers. The pair made it to the semi-finals before they lost to Daniel Nestor and Mariusz Fyrstenberg in straight sets. Their next tournament was the Heineken Open. They made the quarterfinals before withdrawing from the tournament. At the Australian Open they were the 15th seeds (the first time they were a seeded pair in a grand slam tournament). They made the second round before losing to Raven Klaasen and Eric Butorac in straight sets. Due to injury Jamie Murray didn't play again until the BNP Paribas Open where he and regular partner John Peers lost to Julien Benneteau and Édouard Roger-Vasselin. Their next tournament was the Sony Open Tennis where they lost in straight sets to sixth seeds Daniel Nestor and Nenad Zimonjić.

Murray and Peers started their clay court season at the Grand Prix Hassan II where they were the seconds seeds. The pair made the semi-finals before losing to Lukáš Dlouhý and Tomasz Bednarek in straight sets. They made a second consecutive semi-final at the BRD Năstase Țiriac Trophy before losing to top seeds Jean-Julien Rojer and Horia Tecău. At the BMW Open the pair defeated the top seeds Raven Klaasen and Eric Butorac in the semi-finals before defeating fellow countrymen Colin Fleming and Ross Hutchins to win their first title of the year. They then lost in the opening round of the Mutua Madrid Open, but managed to bounce back and reach the semi-finals of the Düsseldorf Open. The pair followed this up by reaching the third round of the French Open, Murray's best result at the tournament, where they were defeated by top seeds Bob and Mike Bryan.

Murray and Peers instantly gained revenge for their loss as the grass court season began, defeating the Bryan brothers in straight sets at the Aegon Championships. They made it all the way to the final, their second of the year, but were beaten by second seeds Alexander Peya and Bruno Soares in a hotly contested match. They then lost their opening match of the Aegon International. At Wimbledon they were seeded 14th and won their opening two matches in straight sets. They then faced Peya and Soares in the third round. The match went all the way to a fifth set but Murray and Peers once again were unable to overcome the duo and narrowly missed out on making their second Grand Slam quarterfinal. Murray did, however, make the quarterfinals of the mixed doubles, partnering Australian Casey Dellacqua.

=== 2015–2020 ===
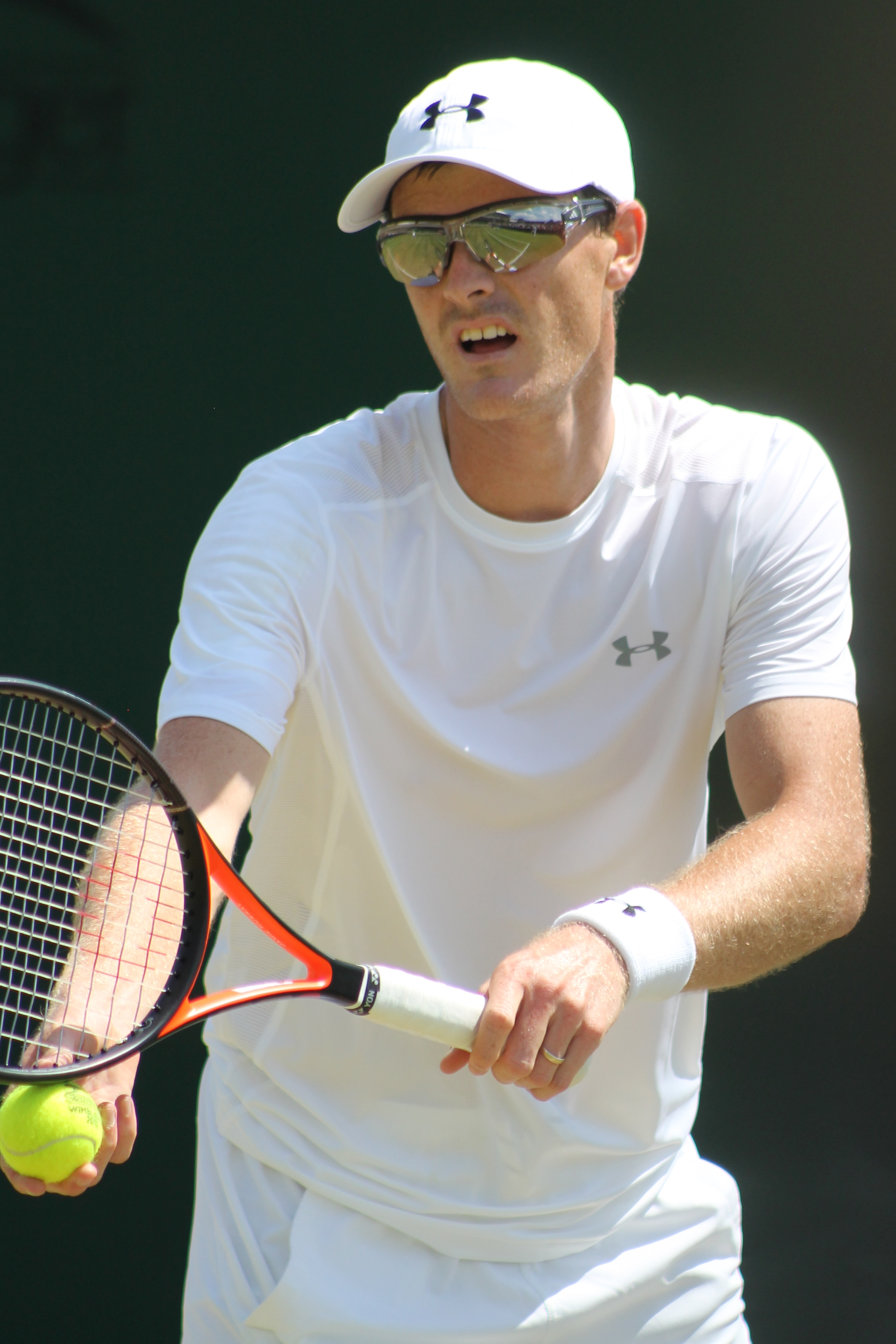
Murray at the 2015 Wimbledon Championships

Murray/Peers again began 2015 at the 2015 Brisbane International where they defeated top seeds Rojer/Tecau in the first round before going on to win the title by defeating the pairing of Dolgopolov/Nishikori. The pair reached the third round at the 2015 Australian Open as the 16th seeds losing to 4th seeds Dodig/Melo. The pair's good form continued in Rotterdam where after losing in the qualifying rounds they were handed a 1R match as lucky losers following a withdrawal. The pair went on to reach the finals before losing in a rematch against Rojer/Tecau.

In March 2015, Murray was selected for the Davis Cup first round tie against the United States in Glasgow. Following Andy Murray and James Ward winning the opening singles rubbers, Murray and Dominic Inglot played the Bryan Brothers; this was the first time Murray and Inglot had played together since the juniors, 12 years previously. After the USA duo cruised through the first two sets, the Brits rallied but fell short at the final hurdle in a five-set defeat. Andy Murray won his next singles match, putting Great Britain through to the Davis Cup quarter-final. The last time Great Britain won back-to-back Davis Cup matches against the USA was 80 years previously. In April, Murray/Peers again reached their third final of the year in Barcelona but lost to Draganja/Kontinen. In May the pair reached back to back quarterfinals at ATP 1000 Masters in Madrid and Rome. In Madrid they lost to Lopez/Mirnyi and in Rome they lost to eventual finalists Granollers/Lopez.

Murray was behind an initiative aimed at engaging with the next generation to make them more active and attract them to tennis. While he was committed to competing with Peers at the Topshelf Open in the Netherlands, eventually losing out in the semi-finals, 64 kids, aged 12 and under, battled it out for the inaugural Jamie Murray Cup and the chance to win flights and tickets to the doubles rubber in next month's Davis Cup tie against France. In July 2015, Murray/Peers reached the final of the 2015 Wimbledon Championships finishing as runners up to Rojer/Tecau in straight sets. He and his brother Andy won their match in the Davis Cup World Group quarter final tie against France to help Great Britain reach the semi-finals of the competition for the first time since 1981. In August 2015, at the Montreal Masters, Murray/Peers defeated Andy Murray/Leander Paes in the second round – the first time the Murrays had competed against each other in a Tour-level match. Jamie Murray declared "It was weird. We've only ever played together", while Andy described it as "awkward". Murray/Peers eventually lost in the quarter-finals.

In September 2015, Murray/Peers saved a match point against Steve Johnson/Sam Querrey in the semi-finals to reach the final of the 2015 US Open, where they finished as runners-up to Nicolas Mahut/Pierre-Hugues Herbert, losing in straight sets. The following week, Murray competed against Australia in the semifinals of the Davis Cup World Group in Glasgow's Emirates Arena, winning his doubles rubber (partnered with his brother) in five sets against the pairing of Sam Groth and Lleyton Hewitt, helping to guide Great Britain to the Davis Cup final for the first time since 1978 with a 3–2 victory. In October, Murray and Peers revealed they would be playing with new partners next year.

Car manufacturer Peugeot announced a two-year sponsorship deal with Jamie lasting until 2017. Murray decided to rest in the hope of finding his best form for the Davis Cup Final by skipping the entirety of the 'Asian swing': a three-week sequence that begins in Shenzhen on Monday and runs through Tokyo, Beijing and Shanghai, incurring a possible financial downside.

Murray was selected for the 2015 final against Belgium in Ghent and played the doubles rubber with brother Andy, defeating David Goffin and Steve Darcis in a hard-fought four-set victory. Great Britain went on to build an unassailable 3–1 lead, winning the Davis Cup for the first time since 1936. Murray joined his Davis Cup teammates at the BBC Sports Personality of the Year show where they won 2015's Team of the Year Award.

Murray partnered Bruno Soares to win the Australian Open, beating Daniel Nestor and Radek Štěpánek in the final on January 30. With Andy Murray losing in the singles final, this was the first time two brothers had reached separate finals at the same Grand Slam since Lawrence and Reginald Doherty at the 1906 Wimbledon Championships. Consequently, Jamie became the doubles world no. 2, while Andy was the singles world no. 2, which was the first time that brothers had achieved this.

The two world number 2's played doubles in the Davis Cup World Group first round match against Japan beating Yoshihito Nishioka and Yasutaka Uchiyama in straight sets in a little under two hours. Andy was chosen because Leon Smith had expected Japan's no. 1 Kei Nishikori, but he had been rested, disappointing Britain's other doubles specialist, Dominic Inglot. Great Britain won 3-1 progressing to the quarterfinals. Following the defeat of Marcelo Melo at the Miami Masters, Murray became the new world No. 1, and overtook Melo at the top of the rankings on the 4th of April.

Murray was appointed Officer of the Order of the British Empire (OBE) in the 2016 Birthday Honours for services to tennis and charity. He and Soares enjoyed more Grand Slam success at the US Open, defeating Pablo Carreño Busta and Guillermo García-López in the final, in straight sets.

In January 2017, Murray and partner Bruno Soares reached the final of the Sydney International losing in straight sets to Dutch pair Wesley Koolhof and Matwé Middelkoop in straight sets. At the 2017 Australian Open they lost in the first round to Americans Sam Querry and Donald Young. In March 2017, they won their first title of 2017 at the Mexico Open, defeating American John Isner and Spaniard Feliciano López in straight sets. In June 2017, Murray and Soares reached the quarterfinals at the 2017 French Open of the men's doubles but lost in three sets to eventual runners-up Santiago González and Donald Young. However, they did go on to win back to back titles during the grass court season at both the Stuttgart Open defeating Oliver Marach and Mate Pavić in three sets, and at the Queen's Club Championships defeating the French duo of Julien Benneteau and Édouard Roger-Vasselin in straight sets.

At the 2017 Wimbledon Championships, Murray and Soares poor run at the Grand Slams continued as they went out in the second round in five sets to Sam Groth and Robert Lindstedt having led two sets to one. However, he won the Mixed Doubles title alongside Martina Hingis without losing a set. They defeated the defending champions: fellow Briton Heather Watson and Finland's Henri Kontinen (the Men's Doubles world No 1) in straight sets. This was exactly 10 years since Jamie won his first title partnering Jelena Janković, and his fourth major title overall.

In August 2017, at the Cincinnati Masters he and Soares lost in the final in straight sets to French pair Pierre-Hugues Herbert and Nicolas Mahut. In September, At the 2017 US Open he again partnered Martina Hingis in the Mixed Doubles. They beat Chinese Taipei's Chan Hao-ching and the New Zealander Michael Venus in three sets in 69 minutes to win the US Open Mixed Doubles Title. Murray and Hingis thus won back to back majors in the Mixed Doubles and currently have an undefeated partnership of 10–0 at the Grand Slams. He and seasonal partner Soares lost in the quarter finals of the Men's Doubles in straight sets to Eventual winners Jean-Julien Rojer and Horia Tecău.

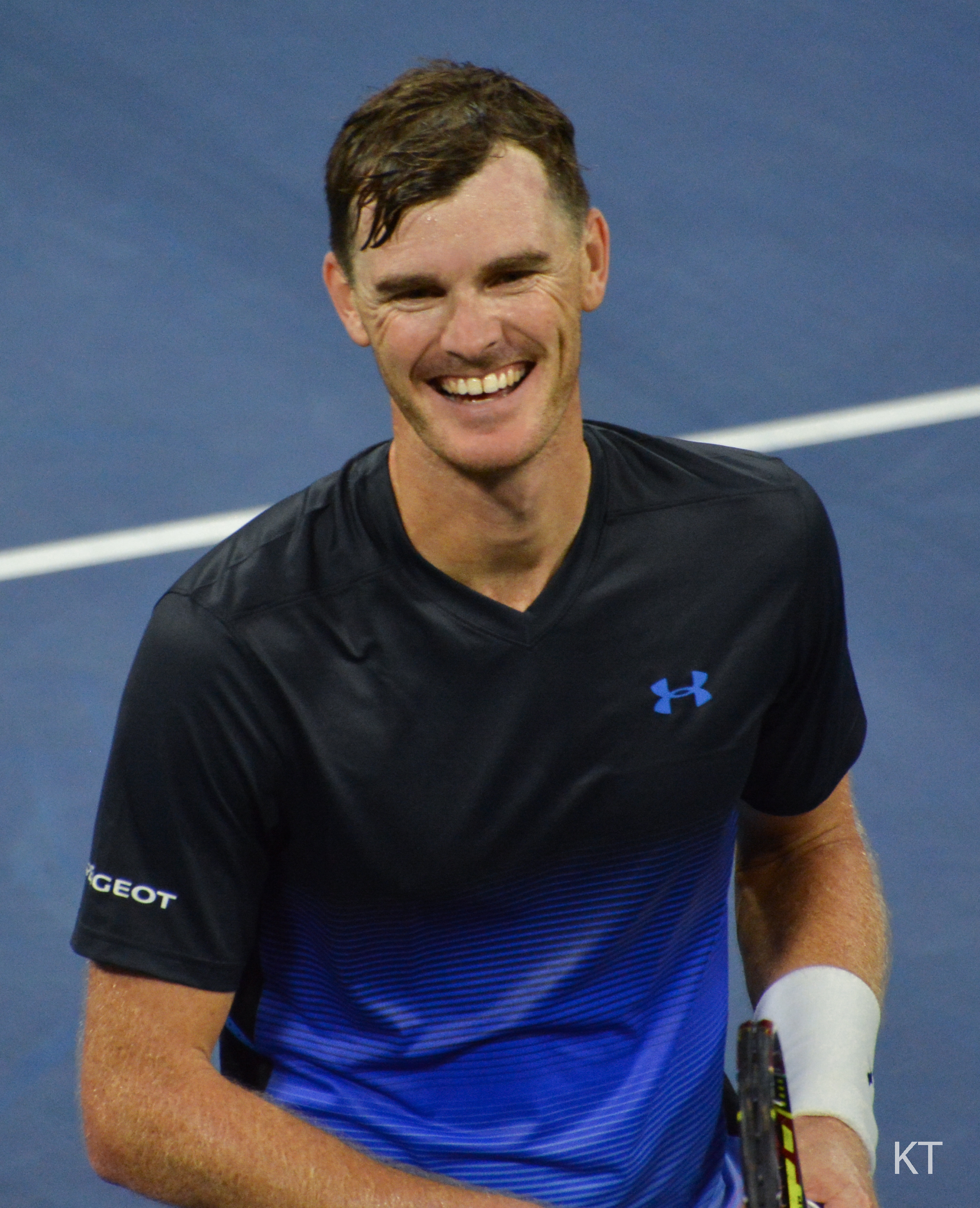
Murray at the 2018 U.S. Open

In July 2018, Murray and new mixed doubles partner Victoria Azarenka reached the final of the Wimbledon tournament, but were defeated in straight sets. In August, he and partner Bruno Soares won the Washington Open followed by the Cincinnati Masters. In September, he retained the US Open mixed doubles title, partnering American Bethanie Mattek-Sands in their first entry as a pair; it was her eighth Grand Slam doubles title overall and Murray's sixth.

In January 2019, Murray and doubles partner Bruno Soares reached the men's doubles quarter-finals of the Australian Open, but were defeated in straight sets, with the same outcome in the mixed doubles with Bethanie Mattek-Sands. After a decline in form including a first round exit at the French Open, Murray split with Soares and formed a new partnership with fellow Briton Neal Skupski. The new duo fell in the first round at Wimbledon, while in the mixed doubles, Murray and Mattek-Sands lost in the second round.

In the quarterfinal of the 2019 Cincinnati Masters tournament, Jamie Murray (the title holder with Soares) and Neal Skupski met Andy Murray and Feliciano López in only the second match between the siblings in their senior careers; Jamie and Skupski won in three sets to progress. The brothers had already teamed up a few weeks earlier for the Washington Open where Jamie was also the reigning champion, being eliminated in the quarterfinals. At the 2019 US Open Murray reached the semifinals in doubles with Skupki and then won the Mixed Doubles with Mattek-Sands.

=== 2021–2026: 30th Title, 500th career win, retirement. ===
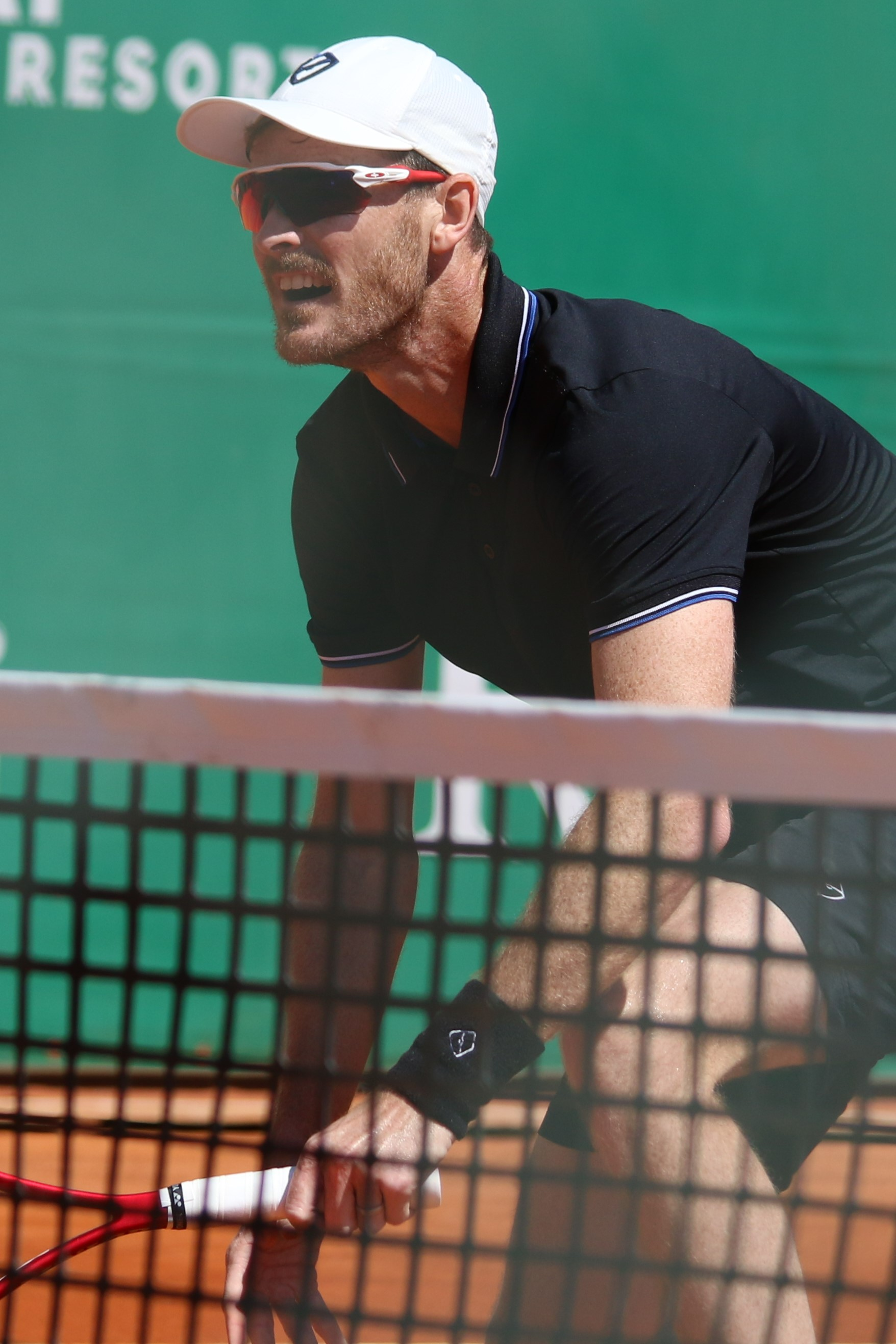
Murray in 2022

At the 2021 US Open Murray partnering with Bruno Soares reached the final for the third time in his career defeating Filip Polášek and John Peers in the semifinals.

On 3 November 2022 at the 2022 Paris Masters, he earned his 500th career win partnering Mathew Ebden, defeating third seeds Marcelo Arevalo and Jean-Julien Rojer. He became only the second active doubles player after Marcelo Melo to reach the milestone.

In his first tournament with new partner Michael Venus, they were runners-up at the 2023 Adelaide International 1. They followed this with a disappointing run at the 2023 Australian Open going out in the second round. Seeded as the top seeds they won their first title at the Dallas Open. The team reached the quarterfinals at a Masters event at Indian Wells. After this run, they won their second title of the season in Banja Luka with a straight sets victory in the final. This was Murray's first clay court title in nearly eight years. Their next two tournaments saw them reach back to back quarterfinals at the Masters events at the 2023 Madrid Open and Italian Open.

In preparation for the French Open the team headed to the 2023 Geneva Open. They went on to win the tournament and their third title of the season, which was also Murray's 30th title of his career with a straight sets victory over the third seeds and clay court specialist pairing of Marcel Granollers and Horacio Zeballos. Unfortunately the team had another poor running at the 2023 French Open as they went out in the third round to the third seeds and defending champions of Marcelo Arévalo and Jean-Julien Rojer in straight sets. However, the poor showing may have been in due part to the fact Murray had to withdraw from his second round Mixed doubles match having come down with food poisoning the following day, an issue which affected multiple players at the Championship. The grass court season didn't fare too well for the team as they fell to first round exits at both Eastbourne and Queens. However, they had a much more positive run at 2023 Wimbledon reaching the quarterfinals.

The 2023 American hardcourt season showed mixed results until Cincinnati where they defeated the No. 1 team in the first round on their way to reaching their first Masters 1000 final. They then lost to the Argentinian pairing of Máximo González and Andrés Molteni in three sets despite having Championship point. Despite showing good form just weeks before the 2023 US Open they went out in the second round in straight sets. Following the final Major of the season, the team travelled to China for the start of the Asian hardcourt swing. They went on to win their fourth title of the season at the 2023 Zhuhai Championships defeating the American pair of Nathaniel Lammons and Jackson Withrow in straight sets. This was the first time in Murray's career he has won four titles in a single season.

The 2024 Season was a slow start for pair including a 1st round defeat at the Australian Open. However, in their next tournament they won their first title of the season and fifth as a partnership at the Qatar Open.

The next few months where a struggle with only a semi-final run to the Madrid Open of note. After which they made another early exit at the second Slam of the year at the French Open.

On 2 June 2024, Jamie's brother, Andy Murray, announced the duo would compete again at the 2024 Wimbledon Championships as a double partnership. They lost to Rinky Hijikata and John Peers in the first round on Centre Court.

Following Wimbledon the Pair only competed in one tournament together after Venus's success with Neal Skupski during the grass court season when Murray was taking on a directors role at Queen's.

Murray now without a permanent partner again proceeded to play with multiple players for the rest of the American hardcourt season and made the semi-finals at the Cincinnati Masters with Ivan Dodig.

Murray, reunited with John Peers Competed together at the US Open but went out at the first round.

Following the final Slam of the season the team went on to have a successful end to the year by winning two titles, their first since 2015. They won the 2024 Swiss Indoors, defeating Wesley Koolhof and Nikola Mektić in the final. They also took the title at the 2024 Belgrade Open, with a win over Ivan Dodig and Skander Mansouri in the final.

In 2024 the University of Stirling will award Murray with an honorary doctorate in recognition of his contribution to Scottish and UK tennis.

On 15 April 2026, Murray confirmed his retirement in a post on social media.

== Career statistics ==
=== Grand Slam tournament performance timeline ===
Key
W	F	SF	QF	#R	RR	Q#	P#	DNQ	A	Z#	PO	G	S	B	NMS	NTI	P	NH

(W) winner; (F) finalist; (SF) semifinalist; (QF) quarterfinalist; (#R) rounds 4, 3, 2, 1; (RR) round-robin stage; (Q#) qualification round; (P#) preliminary round; (DNQ) did not qualify; (A) absent; (Z#) Davis/Fed Cup Zonal Group (with number indication) or (PO) play-off; (G) gold, (S) silver or (B) bronze Olympic/Paralympic medal; (NMS) not a Masters tournament; (NTI) not a Tier I tournament; (P) postponed; (NH) not held; (SR) strike rate (events won / competed); (W–L) win–loss record.
To avoid confusion and double counting, these charts are updated at the conclusion of a tournament or when the player's participation has ended.

=== Doubles ===
Current through the 2025 US Open.

Tournament	2006	2007	2008	2009	2010	2011	2012	2013	2014	2015	2016	2017	2018	2019	2020	2021	2022	2023	2024	2025	SR	W–L	Win%
Australian Open	A	1R	1R	1R	A	2R	1R	1R	2R	3R	W	1R	2R	QF	2R	SF	3R	2R	1R	2R	1 / 18	23–17	58%
French Open	A	1R	1R	1R	1R	2R	1R	2R	3R	3R	3R	QF	2R	1R	QF	3R	2R	3R	2R	2R	0 / 19	22–19	54%
Wimbledon	1R	3R	3R	1R	1R	2R	2R	1R	3R	F	QF	2R	QF	1R	NH	2R	3R	QF	1R	1R	0 / 19	26–19	58%
US Open	A	2R	1R	A	A	1R	1R	QF	1R	F	W	QF	QF	SF	QF	F	2R	2R	1R	1R	1 / 17	34–16	68%
Win–loss	0–1	3–4	2–4	0–3	0–2	3–4	1–4	4–4	5–4	14–4	17–2	7–4	8–4	7–4	6–3	12–4	6–4	7–4	1–4	2–4	2 / 73	105–71	60%

=== Mixed doubles ===
Tournament	2007	2008	2009	2010	2011	2012	2013	2014	2015	2016	2017	2018	2019	2020	2021	2022	2023	2024	2025	SR	W–L	Win%
Australian Open	A	2R	2R	A	1R	1R	A	1R	2R	QF	A	2R	QF	F	2R	A	QF	2R	1R	0 / 14	16–14	53%
French Open	A	QF	A	A	SF	A	A	1R	2R	QF	A	1R	A	NH	1R	A	2R	A	A	0 / 8	8–7	50%
Wimbledon	W	SF	SF	1R	2R	A	1R	QF	A	A	W	F	2R	NH	A	2R	2R	QF	1R	2 / 14	30–12	71%
US Open	SF	F	A	A	1R	A	A	2R	2R	A	W	W	W	NH	1R	1R	2R	A	A	3 / 11	25–8	75%
Win–loss	9–1	9–4	4–2	0–1	4–4	0–1	0–1	3–4	3–3	4–2	10–0	11–3	8–2	4–1	1–3	1–2	5–3	3–2	0–2	5 / 46	79–41	66%

=== Grand Slam tournament finals ===
==== Doubles: 5 (2 titles, 3 runners-up) ====
Result	Year	Championship	Surface	Partner	Opponents	Score
Loss	2015	Wimbledon	Grass	(Australia) John Peers	(Netherlands) Jean-Julien Rojer (Romania) Horia Tecău	6–7^{(5–7)}, 4–6, 4–6
Loss	2015	US Open	Hard	(Australia) John Peers	(France) Pierre-Hugues Herbert (France) Nicolas Mahut	4–6, 4–6
Win	2016	Australian Open	Hard	(Brazil) Bruno Soares	(Canada) Daniel Nestor (Czech Republic) Radek Štěpánek	2–6, 6–4, 7–5
Win	2016	US Open	Hard	(Brazil) Bruno Soares	(Spain) Pablo Carreño Busta (Spain) Guillermo García López	6–2, 6–3
Loss	2021	US Open	Hard	(Brazil) Bruno Soares	(United States) Rajeev Ram (United Kingdom) Joe Salisbury	6–3, 2–6, 2–6

==== Mixed doubles: 8 (5 titles, 3 runners-up) ====
Result	Year	Championship	Surface	Partner	Opponents	Score
Win	2007	Wimbledon	Grass	(Serbia) Jelena Janković	(Australia) Alicia Molik (Sweden) Jonas Björkman	6–4, 3–6, 6–1
Loss	2008	US Open	Hard	(United States) Liezel Huber	(Zimbabwe) Cara Black (India) Leander Paes	6–7^{(6–8)}, 4–6
Win	2017	Wimbledon (2)	Grass	(Switzerland) Martina Hingis	(United Kingdom) Heather Watson (Finland) Henri Kontinen	6–4, 6–4
Win	2017	US Open	Hard	(Switzerland) Martina Hingis	(Chinese Taipei) Chan Hao-ching (New Zealand) Michael Venus	6–1, 4–6, [10–8]
Loss	2018	Wimbledon	Grass	(Belarus) Victoria Azarenka	(United States) Nicole Melichar (Austria) Alexander Peya	6–7^{(1–7)}, 3–6
Win	2018	US Open (2)	Hard	(United States) Bethanie Mattek-Sands	(Poland) Alicja Rosolska (Croatia) Nikola Mektić	2–6, 6–3, [11–9]
Win	2019	US Open (3)	Hard	(United States) Bethanie Mattek-Sands	(Chinese Taipei) Chan Hao-ching (New Zealand) Michael Venus	6–2, 6–3
Loss	2020	Australian Open	Hard	(United States) Bethanie Mattek-Sands	(Czech Republic) Barbora Krejčíková (Croatia) Nikola Mektić	7–5, 4–6, [1–10]

Awards
Preceded by (Netherlands) Jean-Julien Rojer & (Romania) Horia Tecău	ATP Doubles Team of the Year (with (Brazil) Bruno Soares); 2016	Succeeded by (Poland) Łukasz Kubot & (Brazil) Marcelo Melo
Preceded by (Netherlands) Jean-Julien Rojer & (Romania) Horia Tecău	ITF Men's Doubles World Champion (with (Brazil) Bruno Soares); 2016	Succeeded by (Poland) Łukasz Kubot & (Brazil) Marcelo Melo
