= Carlos Becke =

German tennis player

- Country (sports): Germany
- Born: 26 June 1994 (age 30); Hildesheim, Germany
- Plays: Right-handed
- Prize money: $1,919

Singles
- Career record: 0–0 (at ATP Tour level, Grand Slam level, and in Davis Cup)
- Career titles: 0

Doubles
- Career record: 0–1 (at ATP Tour level, Grand Slam level, and in Davis Cup)
- Career titles: 0
- Highest ranking: No. 1485 (11 July 2016)
- Last updated on: 20 February 2017.

Carlos Becke (born 26 June 1994) is a German tennis player.

Becke has a career high ATP doubles ranking of 1485 achieved on 11 July 2016.

Becke made his ATP main draw debut at the 2013 Bet-at-home Cup Kitzbühel in the doubles draw partnering Philipp Kohlschreiber.
