= 2009 Tatra Banka Slovak Open =

2009 Ritro Slovak Open
- Date: 16–22 November
- Edition: 10th
- Surface: Hard (indoor)
- Location: Bratislava, Slovakia

Champions

Singles
- (Germany) Michael Berrer

Doubles
- (Germany) Philipp Marx / (Slovakia) Igor Zelenay
← 2008 ·	Ritro Slovak Open	· 2010 →

The 2009 Ritro Slovak Open was a professional tennis tournament played on indoor hard courts. It was the tenth edition of the tournament which was part of Tretorn Serie+ of the 2009 ATP Challenger Tour. It took place in Bratislava, Slovakia between 16 and 22 November 2009.

== ATP entrants ==
=== Seeds ===
Country	Player	Rank^{1}	Seed
UZB	Denis Istomin	89	1
SVK	Lukáš Lacko	91	2
CZE	~~Jan Hájek~~	~~102~~	~~3~~
GER	Björn Phau	107	4
FIN	Jarkko Nieminen	109	5
FRA	~~Stéphane Robert~~	~~115~~	~~6~~
AUT	Stefan Koubek	119	7
ISR	Harel Levy	122	8

- Rankings are as of November 9, 2009.

=== Other entrants ===
The following players received wildcards into the singles main draw:

- (Slovakia) Kamil Čapkovič
- (Slovakia) Filip Horanský
- (Poland) Jerzy Janowicz
- (Slovakia) Andrej Martin

The following player received a Special Exempt into the singles main draw:

- (Germany) Tobias Kamke

The following players received entry from the qualifying draw:

- (Australia) Rameez Junaid
- (Slovakia) Ivo Klec
- (Czech Republic) Jan Minář
- (Finland) Juho Paukku
- (Poland) Michał Przysiężny (LL)
- (Slovakia) Marek Semjan (LL)

== Champions ==
=== Singles ===
(Germany) Michael Berrer def. (Slovakia) Dominik Hrbatý, 6–7(6), 6–4, 7–6(3)

=== Doubles ===
(Germany) Philipp Marx / (Slovakia) Igor Zelenay def. (Czech Republic) Leoš Friedl / (Czech Republic) David Škoch, 6–4, 6–4
