= 2024 Slovak Open – Women's doubles =

Women's doubles
- 2024 Slovak Open

Final
- Champions: (Netherlands) Isabelle Haverlag; Elena Pridankina
- Runners-up: (Slovakia) Katarína Kužmová (Slovakia) Nina Vargová
- Score: 7–5, 6–2

Events
Singles	men	women
Doubles	men	women
← 2023 ·	Slovak Open	· 2025 →

Estelle Cascino and Jesika Malečková were the defending champions, but Malečková chose not to participate. Cascino partnered with Emily Appleton, but they lost in the first round to Martyna Kubka and Alicja Rosolska.

Isabelle Haverlag and Elena Pridankina won the title, defeating Katarína Kužmová and Nina Vargová in the final, 7–5, 6–2.

== Seeds ==
1. (France) Elixane Lechemia / (Switzerland) Conny Perrin (quarterfinals)
2. (United Kingdom) Emily Appleton / (France) Estelle Cascino (first round)
3. (Netherlands) Isabelle Haverlag / Elena Pridankina (champions)
4. (Czech Republic) Denisa Hindová / (Czech Republic) Karolína Kubáňová (quarterfinals)

== Draw ==
Key

- Q = Qualifier
- WC = Wild card
- LL = Lucky loser
- Alt = Alternate
- ITF = ITF entry
- PR = Protected ranking
- SR = Special ranking
- SE = Special exempt
- JE = Junior exempt
- JR = Junior Accelerator Programme entrant
- CO = College Accelerator Programme entrant
- NG = Next Gen Accelerator Program entrant
- w/o = Walkover
- r = Retired
- d = Defaulted

=== Draw ===
First round
1	(France) E Lechemia (Switzerland) C Perrin	6	6
(Slovakia) N Kročková (Slovakia) K Strešnáková	3	2
P Iatcenko (Slovakia) R Zelníčková	6	6
E Maklakova; M Zhabrailova	4	4
4	(Czech Republic) D Hindová (Czech Republic) K Kubáňová	6	6
(Slovakia) S Drugdová (Czech Republic) I Šebestová	3	1
(Slovakia) K Kužmová (Slovakia) N Vargová	6	6
WC	(Slovakia) A Jašková (Czech Republic) K Vlčková	1	4
(Slovakia) M Chudejová (Slovakia) M Marušinová	0	3
(Georgia (country)) M Bolkvadze (United Kingdom) F Christie	6	6
(Bulgaria) I Shinikova (United Kingdom) E Webley-Smith	1	3
3	(Netherlands) I Haverlag; E Pridankina	6	6
(Czech Republic) A Kučmová (Czech Republic) A Laboutková	6	6
WC	(Slovakia) M Pohánková (Ukraine) A Sobolieva	3	0
(Poland) M Kubka (Poland) A Rosolska	6	6
2	(United Kingdom) E Appleton (France) E Cascino	3	2

Quarterfinals
1	(France) E Lechemia (Switzerland) C Perrin	6	5	[10]
P Iatcenko (Slovakia) R Zelníčková	4	7	[12]
4	(Czech Republic) D Hindová (Czech Republic) K Kubáňová	7^{7}	3	[4]
(Slovakia) K Kužmová (Slovakia) N Vargová	6^{4}	6	[10]
(Georgia (country)) M Bolkvadze (United Kingdom) F Christie	3	6	[5]
3	(Netherlands) I Haverlag; E Pridankina	6	4	[10]
(Czech Republic) A Kučmová (Czech Republic) A Laboutková	1	4
(Poland) M Kubka (Poland) A Rosolska	6	6

Semifinals
P Iatcenko (Slovakia) R Zelníčková	5	4
(Slovakia) K Kužmová (Slovakia) N Vargová	7	6
3	(Netherlands) I Haverlag; E Pridankina	0	6	[10]
(Poland) M Kubka (Poland) A Rosolska	6	4	[5]

Final
(Slovakia) K Kužmová (Slovakia) N Vargová	5	2
3	(Netherlands) I Haverlag; E Pridankina	7	6
