= 2024 Slovak Open =

- Date: 28 October – 3 November (men); 7 – 13 October (women)
- Edition: 26th (men); 11th (women)
- Category: ATP Challenger Tour 125; ITF Women's World Tennis Tour
- Surface: Hard (indoor)
- Location: Bratislava, Slovakia

Champions

Men's singles
- Roman Safiullin

Women's singles
- (Slovakia) Mia Pohánková

Men's doubles
- (Colombia) Nicolás Barrientos / (United Kingdom) Julian Cash

Women's doubles
- (Netherlands) Isabelle Haverlag / Elena Pridankina
- Slovak Open

The 2024 Slovak Open was a professional tennis tournament played on hard courts. It was the 26th edition of the tournament which was part of the 2024 ATP Challenger Tour and the 11th edition of the tournament which was part of the 2024 ITF Women's World Tennis Tour. It took place in Bratislava, Slovakia between 28 October and 3 November 2024 for the men and 7 and 13 October for the women.

== Champions ==
=== Men's singles ===
- Roman Safiullin def. (Belgium) Raphaël Collignon 6–3, 6–4.

=== Women's singles ===
- (Slovakia) Mia Pohánková def. (Slovakia) Renáta Jamrichová 2–6, 6–4, 6–2.

=== Men's doubles ===
- (Colombia) Nicolás Barrientos / (United Kingdom) Julian Cash def. (Sweden) André Göransson / (Netherlands) Sem Verbeek 6–3, 6–4.

=== Women's doubles ===
- (Netherlands) Isabelle Haverlag / Elena Pridankina def. (Slovakia) Katarína Kužmová / (Slovakia) Nina Vargová 7–5, 6–2.

== Men's singles main-draw entrants ==
=== Seeds ===
Country	Player	Rank^{1}	Seed
	Roman Safiullin	60	1
CAN	Gabriel Diallo	87	2
HUN	Márton Fucsovics	88	3
GBR	Jacob Fearnley	92	4
ITA	Luca Nardi	100	5
BIH	Damir Džumhur	104	6
SUI	Alexander Ritschard	108	7
KAZ	Mikhail Kukushkin	111	8

- ^{1} Rankings are as of 21 October 2024.

=== Other entrants ===
The following players received wildcards into the singles main draw:

- (Czech Republic) Hynek Bartoň
- (Slovakia) Lukáš Pokorný
- (Switzerland) Stan Wawrinka

The following players received entry into the singles main draw as alternates:

- (Brazil) João Fonseca
- (Switzerland) Marc-Andrea Hüsler

The following players received entry from the qualifying draw:

- (Belgium) Raphaël Collignon
- Alibek Kachmazov
- (Slovakia) Miloš Karol
- (Serbia) Hamad Medjedovic
- (United States) Emilio Nava
- (Hungary) Zsombor Piros
