= 2022 Slovak Open – Women's doubles =

Women's doubles
- 2022 Slovak Open

Final
- Champions: (Czech Republic) Jesika Malečková (Czech Republic) Renata Voráčová
- Runners-up: (Slovakia) Katarína Kužmová (Slovakia) Viktória Kužmová
- Score: 2–6, 7–5, [13–11]

Events
Singles	men	women
Doubles	men	women
← 2016 ·	Slovak Open	· 2023 →

Jocelyn Rae and Anna Smith were the defending champions, however Rae retired from professional tennis in 2017, whilst Smith has been inactive in professional tennis since 2019.

Jesika Malečková and Renata Voráčová won the title, defeating Katarína and Viktória Kužmová in the final, 2–6, 7–5, [13–11].

== Seeds ==
1. (Czech Republic) Jesika Malečková / (Czech Republic) Renata Voráčová (champions)
2. (United Kingdom) Freya Christie / (United Kingdom) Ali Collins (semifinals)
3. (Uzbekistan) Nigina Abduraimova / (Poland) Paula Kania-Choduń (semifinals)
4. (Turkey) Berfu Cengiz / (Indonesia) Beatrice Gumulya (first round, withdrew)

== Draw ==
=== Key ===
- Q = Qualifier
- WC = Wild card
- LL = Lucky loser
- Alt = Alternate
- SE = Special exempt
- PR = Protected ranking
- ITF = ITF entry
- JE = Junior exempt
- w/o = Walkover
- r = Retired
- d = Defaulted
- SR = Special ranking

=== Draw ===
First round
1	(Czech Republic) J Malečková (Czech Republic) R Voráčová	6	6
WC	(Slovakia) E Méri (Slovakia) S Suchánková	1	1
(United Kingdom) M Lumsden (Slovakia) K Strešnáková	6	6
(Romania) C Dinu (Romania) A Cadanțu-Ignatik	4	3
3	(Uzbekistan) N Abduraimova (Poland) P Kania-Choduń	6	7^{8}
WC	(Slovakia) I Balus (Slovakia) N Vargová	4	6^{6}
M Bondarenko (Hungary) AK Tóth	4	6	[6]
WC	(Slovakia) R Jamrichová (Slovakia) R Šramková	6	1	[10]
(Czech Republic) N Bartůňková (Czech Republic) B Palicová	7^{7}	6
(Latvia) Di Marcinkēviča (Germany) Y Morderger	6^{4}	4
(Slovakia) K Kužmová (Slovakia) V Kužmová	w/o
4	(Turkey) B Cengiz (Indonesia) B Gumulya
(Czech Republic) D Hindová (Czech Republic) K Kubáňová	3	6	[10]
(Czech Republic) L Klimovičová (Czech Republic) D Šalková	6	3	[6]
(Czech Republic) A Kučmová (Czech Republic) A Laboutková	3	2
2	(United Kingdom) F Christie (United Kingdom) A Collins	6	6

Quarterfinals
1	(Czech Republic) J Malečková (Czech Republic) R Voráčová	4	7^{7}	[10]
(United Kingdom) M Lumsden (Slovakia) K Strešnáková	6	6^{3}	[7]
3	(Uzbekistan) N Abduraimova (Poland) P Kania-Choduń	w/o
WC	(Slovakia) R Jamrichová (Slovakia) R Šramková
(Czech Republic) N Bartůňková (Czech Republic) B Palicová
(Slovakia) K Kužmová (Slovakia) V Kužmová	w/o
(Czech Republic) D Hindová (Czech Republic) K Kubáňová	5	2
2	(United Kingdom) F Christie (United Kingdom) A Collins	7	6

Semifinals
1	(Czech Republic) J Malečková (Czech Republic) R Voráčová	3	6	[10]
3	(Uzbekistan) N Abduraimova (Poland) P Kania-Choduń	6	3	[5]
(Slovakia) K Kužmová (Slovakia) V Kužmová	7^{7}	1	[10]
2	(United Kingdom) F Christie (United Kingdom) A Collins	6^{5}	6	[5]

Final
1	(Czech Republic) J Malečková (Czech Republic) R Voráčová	2	7	[13]
(Slovakia) K Kužmová (Slovakia) V Kužmová	6	5	[11]
