= 2023 Slovak Open =

- Date: 9–15 October (men); 30 October – 5 November (women)
- Edition: 25th (men); 10th (women)
- Category: ATP Challenger Tour 125; ITF Women's World Tennis Tour
- Surface: Hard (Indoor)
- Location: Bratislava, Slovakia

Champions

Men's singles
- (Canada) Gabriel Diallo

Women's singles
- (Germany) Ella Seidel

Men's doubles
- (India) Sriram Balaji / (Germany) Andre Begemann

Women's doubles
- (France) Estelle Cascino / (Czech Republic) Jesika Malečková
- Slovak Open

The 2023 Peugeot Slovak Open was a professional tennis tournament played on hard courts. It was the 25th edition of the tournament which was part of the 2023 ATP Challenger Tour and the tenth edition of the tournament which was part of the 2023 ITF Women's World Tennis Tour. It took place in Bratislava, Slovakia between 9 and 15 October 2023 for the men and 30 October and 5 November for the women.

== Champions ==
=== Men's singles ===
- (Canada) Gabriel Diallo def. (Belgium) Joris De Loore 6–0, 7–5.

=== Women's singles ===
- (Germany) Ella Seidel def. Sofya Lansere, 6–4, 7–6^{(7–4)}

=== Men's doubles ===
- (India) Sriram Balaji / (Germany) Andre Begemann def. (Kazakhstan) Andrey Golubev / (Ukraine) Denys Molchanov 6–3, 5–7, [10–8].

=== Women's doubles ===
- (France) Estelle Cascino / (Czech Republic) Jesika Malečková def. (Czech Republic) Denisa Hindová / (Czech Republic) Karolína Kubáňová, 6–3, 6–2

== Men's singles main-draw entrants ==
=== Seeds ===
Country	Player	Rank^{1}	Seed
AUT	Dominic Thiem	72	1
SUI	Dominic Stricker	88	2
FRA	Benjamin Bonzi	89	3
~~CZE~~	~~Tomáš Macháč~~	~~96~~	~~4~~
GBR	Liam Broady	104	5
HUN	Zsombor Piros	109	6
USA	Maxime Cressy	112	7
SVK	Alex Molčan	113	8

- ^{1} Rankings are as of 25 September 2023.

=== Other entrants ===
The following players received wildcards into the singles main draw:

- (Slovakia) Norbert Gombos
- (Czech Republic) Andrew Paulson
- (Slovakia) Lukáš Pokorný

The following player received entry into the singles main draw using a protected ranking:

- (Czech Republic) ~~Jiří Veselý~~

The following players received entry into the singles main draw as special exempts:

- (United Kingdom) Arthur Fery
- (Lebanon) Benjamin Hassan

The following players received entry from the qualifying draw:

- (Romania) Gabi Adrian Boitan
- (United States) Martin Damm
- (Germany) Peter Gojowczyk
- (North Macedonia) Kalin Ivanovski
- (Ukraine) Illya Marchenko
- (Austria) Dennis Novak

The following players received entry as lucky losers:

- (Turkey) ~~Cem İlkel~~
- (France) Matteo Martineau
- (Australia) Akira Santillan

== Women's singles main-draw entrants ==
=== Seeds ===
Country	Player	Rank^{1}	Seed
~~AUS~~	~~Olivia Gadecki~~	~~128~~	~~1~~
SVK	Rebecca Šramková	129	2
HUN	Dalma Gálfi	154	3
GER	Jule Niemeier	175	4
FRA	Chloé Paquet	186	5
	Sofya Lansere	221	6
GER	Ella Seidel	232	7
CRO	Lea Bošković	243	8

- ^{1} Rankings are as of 23 November 2023.

=== Other entrants ===
The following players received wildcards into the singles main draw:

- (Slovakia) Renáta Jamrichová
- (Slovakia) Katarína Kužmová
- (Slovakia) Eszter Méri
- (Slovakia) Nina Vargová

The following players received entry from the qualifying draw:

- Alevtina Ibragimova
- Valeriia Olianovskaia
- (Slovakia) Mia Pohánková
- (Germany) Lara Schmidt
- (Slovakia) Katarína Strešnáková
- (Germany) Stephanie Wagner
- (Germany) Angelina Wirges
- (Slovakia) Radka Zelníčková

The following players received entry as lucky losers:

- (Czech Republic) Aneta Laboutková
- (Slovakia) Emma Tóthová
