= 2023 Slovak Open – Women's singles =

Women's singles
- 2023 Slovak Open

Final
- Champion: (Germany) Ella Seidel
- Runner-up: Sofya Lansere
- Score: 6–4, 7–6^{(7–4)}

Events
Singles	men	women
Doubles	men	women
← 2022 ·	Slovak Open	· 2024 →

Ana Konjuh was the defending champion but chose not to participate.

Ella Seidel won the title, defeating Sofya Lansere in the final, 6–4, 7–6^{(7–4)}.

== Seeds ==
1. (Australia) Olivia Gadecki (withdrew)
2. (Slovakia) Rebecca Šramková (first round)
3. (Hungary) Dalma Gálfi (quarterfinals)
4. (Germany) Jule Niemeier (quarterfinals)
5. (France) Chloé Paquet (quarterfinals)
6. Sofya Lansere (final)
7. (Germany) Ella Seidel (champion)
8. (Croatia) Lea Bošković (semifinals)

== Draw ==
=== Key ===
- Q = Qualifier
- WC = Wild card
- LL = Lucky loser
- Alt = Alternate
- SE = Special exempt
- PR = Protected ranking
- ITF = ITF entry
- JE = Junior exempt
- w/o = Walkover
- r = Retired
- d = Defaulted
- SR = Special ranking

=== Finals ===
Semifinals
7	(Germany) Ella Seidel	7^{8}	3	6
8	(Croatia) Lea Bošković	6^{6}	6	1
6	Sofya Lansere	7	6
WC	(Slovakia) Renáta Jamrichová	5	3

Final
7	(Germany) Ella Seidel	6	7^{7}
6	Sofya Lansere	4	6^{4}

=== Top half ===
First round
LL	(Czech Republic) A Laboutková	2	3
Q	(Slovakia) M Pohánková	6	6
Q	(Germany) S Wagner	6	6
Q	(Germany) L Schmidt	4	4
E Yashina	1	2
(Italy) S Ambrosio	6	6
WC	(Slovakia) N Vargová	5	2
7	(Germany) E Seidel	7	6
4	(Germany) J Niemeier	1	6	0
(Poland) M Kubka	6	3	0^{r}
(Hungary) AK Tóth	0	3
(Turkey) A Aksu	6	6
LL	(Slovakia) E Tóthová	2	2
(Czech Republic) J Malečková	6	6
Q	(Germany) A Wirges	2	4
8	(Croatia) L Bošković	6	6

Second round
Q	(Slovakia) M Pohánková	6	5	6
Q	(Germany) S Wagner	3	7	4
(Italy) S Ambrosio	6^{5}	6	2
7	(Germany) E Seidel	7^{7}	4	6
4	(Germany) J Niemeier	6	7
(Turkey) A Aksu	1	5
(Czech Republic) J Malečková	2	0
8	(Croatia) L Bošković	6	6

Quarterfinals
Q	(Slovakia) M Pohánková	6	2	3
7	(Germany) E Seidel	4	6	6
4	(Germany) J Niemeier	1	7^{7}	2
8	(Croatia) L Bošković	6	6^{3}	6

Semifinals
7	(Germany) E Seidel	7^{8}	3	6
8	(Croatia) L Bošković	6^{6}	6	1

=== Bottom half ===
First round
6	S Lansere	6	6
WC	(Slovakia) K Kužmová	0	3
(Finland) A Kulikova	7^{7}	6
(Romania) IG Ghioroaie	6^{3}	4
(Czech Republic) N Bartůňková	6^{2}	6	6
WC	(Slovakia) E Méri	7^{7}	1	3
Q	(Slovakia) R Zelníčková	4	5
3	(Hungary) D Gálfi	6	7
5	(France) C Paquet	7^{9}	6
Q	V Olianovskaia	6^{7}	2
(Czech Republic) A Kučmová	6	6
Q	(Slovakia) K Strešnáková	2	2
WC	(Slovakia) R Jamrichová	3	6	6
(Czech Republic) J Štruplová	6	2	3
Q	A Ibragimova	6	6
2	(Slovakia) R Šramková	1	3

Second round
6	S Lansere	w/o
(Finland) A Kulikova
(Czech Republic) N Bartůňková	4	5
3	(Hungary) D Gálfi	6	7
5	(France) C Paquet	6	6
(Czech Republic) A Kučmová	1	1
WC	(Slovakia) R Jamrichová	3	6	6
Q	A Ibragimova	6	2	3

Quarterfinals
6	S Lansere	4	6	6
3	(Hungary) D Gálfi	6	3	3
5	(France) C Paquet	5	7^{7}	4
WC	(Slovakia) R Jamrichová	7	6^{5}	6

Semifinals
6	S Lansere	7	6
WC	(Slovakia) R Jamrichová	5	3
