= 2022 Slovak Open =

- Date: 7–13 November (men); 14–20 November (women)
- Edition: 24th (men); 9th (women)
- Category: ATP Challenger Tour; ITF Women's World Tennis Tour
- Surface: Hard (Indoor)
- Location: Bratislava, Slovakia

Champions

Men's singles
- (Hungary) Márton Fucsovics

Women's singles
- (Croatia) Ana Konjuh

Men's doubles
- (Ukraine) Denys Molchanov / (Kazakhstan) Aleksandr Nedovyesov

Women's doubles
- (Czech Republic) Jesika Malečková / (Czech Republic) Renata Voráčová
- Slovak Open

The 2022 Peugeot Slovak Open was a professional tennis tournament played on hard courts. It was the 24th edition of the tournament which was part of the 2022 ATP Challenger Tour and the ninth edition of the tournament which was part of the 2022 ITF Women's World Tennis Tour. It took place in Bratislava, Slovakia between 7 and 20 November 2022.

== Champions ==
=== Men's singles ===
- (Hungary) Márton Fucsovics def. (Hungary) Fábián Marozsán 6–2, 6–4.

=== Women's singles ===
- (Croatia) Ana Konjuh def. (Uzbekistan) Nigina Abduraimova, 2–6, 6–0, 7–6^{(7–2)}

=== Men's doubles ===
- (Ukraine) Denys Molchanov / (Kazakhstan) Aleksandr Nedovyesov def. (Czech Republic) Petr Nouza / (Czech Republic) Andrew Paulson 4–6, 6–4, [10–6].

=== Women's doubles ===
- (Czech Republic) Jesika Malečková / (Czech Republic) Renata Voráčová def. (Slovakia) Katarína Kužmová / (Slovakia) Viktória Kužmová, 2–6, 7–5, [13–11]

== Men's singles main-draw entrants ==
=== Seeds ===
Country	Player	Rank^{1}	Seed
CHN	Zhang Zhizhen	99	1
HUN	Márton Fucsovics	103	2
SVK	Norbert Gombos	111	3
CZE	Tomáš Macháč	114	4
NED	Tim van Rijthoven	115	5
AUT	Jurij Rodionov	130	6
NED	Jelle Sels	131	7
SVK	Jozef Kovalík	133	8

- ^{1} Rankings are as of 31 October 2022.

=== Other entrants ===
The following players received wildcards into the singles main draw:

- (Czech Republic) Jakub Menšík
- (Slovakia) Lukáš Pokorný
- (Slovakia) Peter Benjamín Privara

The following players received entry from the qualifying draw:

- (Norway) Viktor Durasovic
- (Turkey) Cem İlkel
- (Ukraine) Illya Marchenko
- (Serbia) Hamad Međedović
- (Germany) Henri Squire
- (Italy) Stefano Travaglia

== Women's singles main-draw entrants ==
=== Seeds ===
Country	Player	Rank^{1}	Seed
SVK	Anna Karolína Schmiedlová	100	1
UKR	Daria Snigur	106	2
GER	Eva Lys	123	3
CRO	Ana Konjuh	136	4
SVK	Viktória Kužmová	146	5
ROU	Jaqueline Cristian	148	6
ROU	Alexandra Cadanțu-Ignatik	171	7
UZB	Nigina Abduraimova	192	8

- ^{1} Rankings are as of 7 November 2022.

=== Other entrants ===
The following players received wildcards into the singles main draw:

- (Slovakia) Irina Balus
- (Slovakia) Nikola Daubnerová
- (Slovakia) Renáta Jamrichová
- (Slovakia) Nina Vargová

The following player received entry into the singles main draw using a protected ranking:

- (United Kingdom) Maia Lumsden

The following players received entry from the qualifying draw:

- (United Kingdom) Freya Christie
- (Czech Republic) Denisa Hindová
- (Slovakia) Anika Jašková
- (Switzerland) Bojana Klincov
- (Czech Republic) Aneta Kučmová
- (Slovakia) Katarína Kužmová
- (Slovakia) Eszter Méri
- (Hungary) Amarissa Kiara Tóth

The following player received entry as a lucky loser:

- (Serbia) Mia Ristić
