= 2024 Slovak Open – Women's singles =

Women's singles
- 2024 Slovak Open

Final
- Champion: (Slovakia) Mia Pohánková
- Runner-up: (Slovakia) Renáta Jamrichová
- Score: 2–6, 6–4, 6–2

Events
Singles	men	women
Doubles	men	women
← 2023 ·	Slovak Open	· 2025 →

Ella Seidel was the defending champion but chose not to participate.

Wildcard Mia Pohánková won the title, defeating fellow wildcard Renáta Jamrichová in an all Slovakian final, 2–6, 6–4, 6–2.

== Seeds ==
1. (France) Océane Dodin (semifinals)
2. (France) Chloé Paquet (second round)
3. (France) Elsa Jacquemot (quarterfinals)
4. Anastasia Zakharova (second round)
5. (Croatia) Antonia Ružić (semifinals)
6. Elena Pridankina (quarterfinals)
7. Julia Avdeeva (second round)
8. (Ukraine) Anastasiia Sobolieva (second round)

== Draw ==
=== Key ===
- Q = Qualifier
- WC = Wild card
- LL = Lucky loser
- Alt = Alternate
- SE = Special exempt
- PR = Protected ranking
- ITF = ITF entry
- JE = Junior exempt
- w/o = Walkover
- r = Retired
- d = Defaulted
- SR = Special ranking

=== Finals ===
Semifinals
1	(France) Océane Dodin	3	6	1
WC	(Slovakia) Mia Pohánková	6	2	6
5	(Croatia) Antonia Ružić	2	4
WC	(Slovakia) Renáta Jamrichová	6	6

Final
WC	(Slovakia) Mia Pohánková	2	6	6
WC	(Slovakia) Renáta Jamrichová	6	4	2

=== Top half ===
First round
1	(France) O Dodin	7	6
Q	(Czech Republic) V Valdmannová	5	2
(Turkey) B Cengiz	4	6	6
(Bulgaria) I Shinikova	6	4	2
(Switzerland) C Naef	6	6
WC	(Slovakia) N Kročková	0	2
WC	(Slovakia) N Vargová	6^{2}	1
8	(Ukraine) A Sobolieva	7^{7}	6
4	A Zakharova	6	3	6
Q	(Slovakia) K Kužmová	2	6	4
WC	(Slovakia) M Pohánková	6	7
(Switzerland) V Ryser	4	5
Q	(Estonia) E Malõgina	6	6
Q	(Slovakia) K Strešnáková	3	2
(Georgia (country)) M Bolkvadze	3	3
6	E Pridankina	6	6

Second round
1	(France) O Dodin	6	6
(Turkey) B Cengiz	3	3
(Switzerland) C Naef	6	6
8	(Ukraine) A Sobolieva	2	2
4	A Zakharova	3	3
WC	(Slovakia) M Pohánková	6	6
Q	(Estonia) E Malõgina	1	3
6	E Pridankina	6	6

Quarterfinals
1	(France) O Dodin	6	6
(Switzerland) C Naef	2	4
WC	(Slovakia) M Pohánková	6	6
6	E Pridankina	3	4

Semifinals
1	(France) O Dodin	3	6	1
WC	(Slovakia) M Pohánková	6	2	6

=== Bottom half ===
First round
5	(Croatia) A Ružić	6	6
(North Macedonia) L Gjorcheska	4	1
(United Kingdom) A Banks	6	6
Q	P Iatcenko	4	1
Q	E Maklakova	4	3
(Poland) M Kubka	6	6
(Romania) PM Țig	3	4
3	(France) E Jacquemot	6	6
7	J Avdeeva	6	6
(Czech Republic) B Palicová	1	4
(Czech Republic) A Kučmová	3	1
WC	(Slovakia) R Jamrichová	6	6
(Germany) N Schunk	6^{2}	5
Q	(Slovakia) R Zelníčková	7^{7}	7
Q	M Zhabrailova	4	1
2	(France) C Paquet	6	6

Second round
5	(Croatia) A Ružić	6	0	6
(United Kingdom) A Banks	4	6	1
(Poland) M Kubka	4	2
3	(France) E Jacquemot	6	6
7	J Avdeeva	4	6	2
WC	(Slovakia) R Jamrichová	6	2	6
Q	(Slovakia) R Zelníčková	7	6
2	(France) C Paquet	5	1

Quarterfinals
5	(Croatia) A Ružić	6	6
3	(France) E Jacquemot	2	3
WC	(Slovakia) R Jamrichová	6	6
Q	(Slovakia) R Zelníčková	4	2

Semifinals
5	(Croatia) A Ružić	2	4
WC	(Slovakia) R Jamrichová	6	6
