= 2022 Slovak Open – Women's singles =

Women's singles
- 2022 Slovak Open

Final
- Champion: (Croatia) Ana Konjuh
- Runner-up: (Uzbekistan) Nigina Abduraimova
- Score: 2–6, 6–0, 7–6^{(7–2)}

Events
Singles	men	women
Doubles	men	women
← 2016 ·	Slovak Open	· 2023 →

Andreea Mitu was the defending champion but chose not to participate.

Ana Konjuh won the title, defeating Nigina Abduraimova in the final, 2–6, 6–0, 7–6^{(7–2)}.

== Seeds ==
1. (Slovakia) Anna Karolína Schmiedlová (quarterfinals)
2. (Ukraine) Daria Snigur (quarterfinals)
3. (Germany) Eva Lys (first round, retired)
4. (Croatia) Ana Konjuh (champion)
5. (Slovakia) Viktória Kužmová (first round)
6. (Romania) Jaqueline Cristian (second round)
7. (Romania) Alexandra Cadanțu-Ignatik (first round, retired)
8. (Uzbekistan) Nigina Abduraimova (final)

== Draw ==
=== Key ===
- Q = Qualifier
- WC = Wild card
- LL = Lucky loser
- Alt = Alternate
- SE = Special exempt
- PR = Protected ranking
- ITF = ITF entry
- JE = Junior exempt
- w/o = Walkover
- r = Retired
- d = Defaulted
- SR = Special ranking

=== Finals ===
Semifinals
WC	(Slovakia) Renáta Jamrichová	6^{5}	1^{r}
4	(Croatia) Ana Konjuh	7^{7}	1
8	(Uzbekistan) Nigina Abduraimova	6	7
(Czech Republic) Barbora Palicová	4	5

Final
4	(Croatia) Ana Konjuh	2	6	7^{7}
8	(Uzbekistan) Nigina Abduraimova	6	0	6^{2}

=== Top half ===
First round
1	(Slovakia) AK Schmiedlová	6	6
(Romania) C Dinu	2	3
Q	(Slovakia) K Kužmová	6	4	6
(Turkey) Z Sönmez	3	6	4
WC	(Slovakia) R Jamrichová	7	6
(Czech Republic) D Šalková	5	1
Q	(Czech Republic) D Hindová	1	2
6	(Romania) J Cristian	6	6
4	(Croatia) A Konjuh	6	6
(Czech Republic) J Malečková	3	2
(Latvia) Di Marcinkēviča	6	1
(Turkey) B Cengiz	1	0^{r}
Q	(Czech Republic) A Kučmová	6	6^{5}	6
Q	(Slovakia) E Méri	1	7^{7}	0
(Czech Republic) N Bartůňková	6	5	6
5	(Slovakia) V Kužmová	3	7	3

Second round
1	(Slovakia) AK Schmiedlová	6	6
Q	(Slovakia) K Kužmová	3	2
WC	(Slovakia) R Jamrichová	7^{7}	3	7^{10}
6	(Romania) J Cristian	6^{1}	6	6^{8}
4	(Croatia) A Konjuh	6	6
(Latvia) Di Marcinkēviča	3	2
Q	(Czech Republic) A Kučmová	4	1^{r}
(Czech Republic) N Bartůňková	6	3

Quarterfinals
1	(Slovakia) AK Schmiedlová	4	4
WC	(Slovakia) R Jamrichová	6	6
4	(Croatia) A Konjuh	6	6
(Czech Republic) N Bartůňková	1	3

Semifinals
WC	(Slovakia) R Jamrichová	6^{5}	1^{r}
4	(Croatia) A Konjuh	7^{7}	1

=== Bottom half ===
First round
8	(Uzbekistan) N Abduraimova	7^{7}	6
(Ukraine) K Volodko	6^{5}	3
(Slovakia) R Šramková	0	6	6
Q	(Switzerland) B Klincov	6	3	3
Q	(Slovakia) A Jašková	4	6	7^{7}
Q	(United Kingdom) F Christie	6	3	6^{5}
Q	(Hungary) AK Tóth	4
3	(Germany) E Lys	4^{r}
7	(Romania) A Cadanțu-Ignatik	0^{r}
WC	(Slovakia) N Vargová	4
(Czech Republic) B Palicová	6	6
M Bondarenko	1	2
PR	(United Kingdom) M Lumsden	5	6	6
WC	(Slovakia) I Balus	7	3	4
LL	(Serbia) M Ristić	1	1
2	(Ukraine) D Snigur	6	6

Second round
8	(Uzbekistan) N Abduraimova	6	6
(Slovakia) R Šramková	2	4
Q	(Slovakia) A Jašková	3	1
Q	(Hungary) AK Tóth	6	6
WC	(Slovakia) N Vargová	1	2
(Czech Republic) B Palicová	6	6
PR	(United Kingdom) M Lumsden	2	6	4
2	(Ukraine) D Snigur	6	4	6

Quarterfinals
8	(Uzbekistan) N Abduraimova	6	6^{6}	6
Q	(Hungary) AK Tóth	4	7^{8}	3
(Czech Republic) B Palicová	1	6	6
2	(Ukraine) D Snigur	6	2	3

Semifinals
8	(Uzbekistan) N Abduraimova	6	7
(Czech Republic) B Palicová	4	5
