= 2024 Slovak Open – Men's singles =

Men's singles
- 2024 Slovak Open

Final
- Champion: Roman Safiullin
- Runner-up: (Belgium) Raphaël Collignon
- Score: 6–3, 6–4

Events
Singles	men	women
Doubles	men	women
- Slovak Open

Gabriel Diallo was the defending champion but lost in the quarterfinals to Raphaël Collignon.

Roman Safiullin won the title after defeating Collignon 6–3, 6–4 in the final.

== Seeds ==
1. Roman Safiullin (champion)
2. (Canada) Gabriel Diallo (quarterfinals)
3. (Hungary) Márton Fucsovics (first round)
4. (United Kingdom) Jacob Fearnley (quarterfinals)
5. (Italy) Luca Nardi (first round)
6. (Bosnia and Herzegovina) Damir Džumhur (first round)
7. (Switzerland) Alexander Ritschard (first round)
8. (Kazakhstan) Mikhail Kukushkin (second round)

== Draw ==
Key

- Q = Qualifier
- WC = Wild card
- LL = Lucky loser
- Alt = Alternate
- ITF = ITF entry
- PR = Protected ranking
- SR = Special ranking
- SE = Special exempt
- JE = Junior exempt
- JR = Junior Accelerator Programme entrant
- CO = College Accelerator Programme entrant
- NG = Next Gen Accelerator Program entrant
- w/o = Walkover
- r = Retired
- d = Defaulted

=== Finals ===
Semifinals
1	Roman Safiullin	6	6
(Japan) Kei Nishikori	4	3
(Croatia) Dino Prižmić	6	3	6^{4}
Q	(Belgium) Raphaël Collignon	3	6	7^{7}

Final
1	Roman Safiullin	6	6
Q	(Belgium) Raphaël Collignon	3	4

=== Top half ===
First round
1	R Safiullin	7^{9}	7^{7}
Q	(Slovakia) M Karol	6^{7}	6^{5}
Alt	(Switzerland) M-A Hüsler	6	6
WC	(Czech Republic) H Bartoň	2	4
(Slovakia) J Kovalík	4	7^{7}	7^{7}
(France) L Van Assche	6	6^{5}	6^{0}
A Karatsev	6^{6}	7^{7}	7^{7}
7	(Switzerland) A Ritschard	7^{8}	6^{4}	6^{3}
3	(Hungary) M Fucsovics	2	6	1
(Japan) K Nishikori	6	1	6
(Finland) O Virtanen	3	4
(Slovakia) L Klein	6	6
(France) C Lestienne	3	7^{7}	7
(Serbia) L Djere	6	6^{5}	5
Alt	(Brazil) J Fonseca	4	7	4
8	(Kazakhstan) M Kukushkin	6	5	6

Second round
1	R Safiullin	6	6
Alt	(Switzerland) M-A Hüsler	4	3
(Slovakia) J Kovalík	6^{6}	1
A Karatsev	7^{8}	6
(Japan) K Nishikori	6	6^{3}	6
(Slovakia) L Klein	3	7^{7}	1
(France) C Lestienne	3	6	6
8	(Kazakhstan) M Kukushkin	6	1	2

Quarterfinals
1	R Safiullin	6	6
A Karatsev	3	2
(Japan) K Nishikori	6	5	6
(France) C Lestienne	3	7	2

Semifinals
1	R Safiullin	6	6
(Japan) K Nishikori	4	3

=== Bottom half ===
First round
5	(Italy) L Nardi	3	4
(Croatia) D Prižmić	6	6
(Germany) M Marterer	4	3
WC	(Switzerland) S Wawrinka	6	6
(United Kingdom) B Harris	4	5
Q	A Kachmazov	6	7
WC	(Slovakia) L Pokorný	6^{3}	1
4	(United Kingdom) J Fearnley	7^{7}	6
6	(Bosnia and Herzegovina) D Džumhur	3	2
Q	(United States) Em Nava	6	6
Q	(Belgium) R Collignon	6	3	6
Q	(Serbia) H Medjedovic	3	6	3
(France) P-H Herbert	6	6
(Argentina) TA Tirante	3	2
Q	(Hungary) Z Piros	1	5
2	(Canada) G Diallo	6	7

Second round
(Croatia) D Prižmić	6	4	6
WC	(Switzerland) S Wawrinka	2	6	3
Q	A Kachmazov	2	4
4	(United Kingdom) J Fearnley	6	6
Q	(United States) Em Nava	7^{7}	3	5
Q	(Belgium) R Collignon	6^{3}	6	7
(France) P-H Herbert	2	4
2	(Canada) G Diallo	6	6

Quarterfinals
(Croatia) D Prižmić	3	6	6
4	(United Kingdom) J Fearnley	6	4	3
Q	(Belgium) R Collignon	3	7^{7}	7
2	(Canada) G Diallo	6	6^{3}	5

Semifinals
(Croatia) D Prižmić	6	3	6^{4}
Q	(Belgium) R Collignon	3	6	7^{7}
