= 2022 Slovak Open – Men's doubles =

Men's doubles
- 2022 Slovak Open

Final
- Champions: (Ukraine) Denys Molchanov (Kazakhstan) Aleksandr Nedovyesov
- Runners-up: (Czech Republic) Petr Nouza (Czech Republic) Andrew Paulson
- Score: 4–6, 6–4, [10–6]

Events
| Singles | men | women |
| Doubles | men | women |
- Slovak Open

Filip Horanský and Sergiy Stakhovsky were the defending champions but chose not to defend their title.

Denys Molchanov and Aleksandr Nedovyesov won the title after defeating Petr Nouza and Andrew Paulson 4–6, 6–4, [10–6] in the final.

== Seeds ==
1. (Austria) Alexander Erler / (Austria) Lucas Miedler (first round)
2. (Serbia) Nikola Ćaćić / (United Kingdom) Jonny O'Mara (first round)
3. (Ukraine) Denys Molchanov / (Kazakhstan) Aleksandr Nedovyesov (champions)
4. (Czech Republic) Roman Jebavý / (Czech Republic) Adam Pavlásek (quarterfinals)

== Draw ==
Key

- Q = Qualifier
- WC = Wild card
- LL = Lucky loser
- Alt = Alternate
- ITF = ITF entry
- PR = Protected ranking
- SR = Special ranking
- SE = Special exempt
- JE = Junior exempt
- JR = Junior Accelerator Programme entrant
- CO = College Accelerator Programme entrant
- NG = Next Gen Accelerator Program entrant
- w/o = Walkover
- r = Retired
- d = Defaulted

First round
1 | (Austria) A Erler (Austria) L Miedler | 4 | 7^{7} | [6]
(Hungary) F Marozsán (Czech Republic) L Rosol | 6 | 6^{2} | [10]
WC | (Slovakia) M Karol (Slovakia) L Pokorný | 4 | 4
(Monaco) R Arneodo (Austria) T-S Weissborn | 6 | 6
4 | (Czech Republic) R Jebavý (Czech Republic) A Pavlásek | 7 | 6
(Kazakhstan) G Lomakin; A Shevchenko | 5 | 2
(Czech Republic) P Nouza (Czech Republic) A Paulson | 6 | 6
(Czech Republic) V Kopřiva (Czech Republic) J Pospíšil | 3 | 3
(Norway) V Durasovic (Finland) P Niklas-Salminen | 6 | 1 | [10]
(India) P Raja (India) D Sharan | 3 | 6 | [8]
(Serbia) I Sabanov (Serbia) M Sabanov | 4 | 7^{7} | [7]
3 | (Ukraine) D Molchanov (Kazakhstan) A Nedovyesov | 6 | 6^{4} | [10]
(Austria) D Pichler (Ukraine) V Sachko | 7^{8} | 6
WC | (Slovakia) Peter Naď (Slovakia) Peter Benjamín Privara | 6^{6} | 0
(Croatia) F Škugor (Slovakia) I Zelenay | 6 | 6
2 | (Serbia) N Ćaćić (United Kingdom) J O'Mara | 3 | 2

Quarterfinals
(Hungary) F Marozsán (Czech Republic) L Rosol | 4 | 3
(Monaco) R Arneodo (Austria) T-S Weissborn | 6 | 6
4 | (Czech Republic) R Jebavý (Czech Republic) A Pavlásek | 6 | 3 | [8]
(Czech Republic) P Nouza (Czech Republic) A Paulson | 3 | 6 | [10]
(Norway) V Durasovic (Finland) P Niklas-Salminen | 4 | 1
3 | (Ukraine) D Molchanov (Kazakhstan) A Nedovyesov | 6 | 6
(Austria) D Pichler (Ukraine) V Sachko | 6^{7} | 5
(Croatia) F Škugor (Slovakia) I Zelenay | 7^{9} | 7

Semifinals
(Monaco) R Arneodo (Austria) T-S Weissborn | 2 | 6^{6}
(Czech Republic) P Nouza (Czech Republic) A Paulson | 6 | 7^{8}
3 | (Ukraine) D Molchanov (Kazakhstan) A Nedovyesov | 7^{7} | 7^{7}
(Croatia) F Škugor (Slovakia) I Zelenay | 6^{2} | 6^{4}

Final
(Czech Republic) P Nouza (Czech Republic) A Paulson | 6 | 4 | [6]
3 | (Ukraine) D Molchanov (Kazakhstan) A Nedovyesov | 4 | 6 | [10]
