= 2023 Slovak Open – Men's singles =

Men's singles
- 2023 Slovak Open

Final
- Champion: (Canada) Gabriel Diallo
- Runner-up: (Belgium) Joris De Loore
- Score: 6–0, 7–5

Events
Singles	men	women
Doubles	men	women
- Slovak Open

Márton Fucsovics was the defending champion but chose not to defend his title.

Gabriel Diallo won the title after defeating Joris De Loore 6–0, 7–5 in the final.

== Seeds ==
1. (Austria) Dominic Thiem (second round)
2. (Switzerland) Dominic Stricker (first round)
3. (France) Benjamin Bonzi (first round)
4. (Czech Republic) Tomáš Macháč (withdrew)
5. (United Kingdom) Liam Broady (first round)
6. (Hungary) Zsombor Piros (second round)
7. (United States) Maxime Cressy (quarterfinals)
8. (Slovakia) Alex Molčan (first round)

== Draw ==
Key

- Q = Qualifier
- WC = Wild card
- LL = Lucky loser
- Alt = Alternate
- ITF = ITF entry
- PR = Protected ranking
- SR = Special ranking
- SE = Special exempt
- JE = Junior exempt
- JR = Junior Accelerator Programme entrant
- CO = College Accelerator Programme entrant
- NG = Next Gen Accelerator Program entrant
- w/o = Walkover
- r = Retired
- d = Defaulted

=== Finals ===
Semifinals
(Canada) Gabriel Diallo	7^{7}	6
Q	(United States) Martin Damm	6^{5}	2
(Belgium) Joris De Loore	7	7^{7}
(Italy) Luca Nardi	5	6^{5}

Final
(Canada) Gabriel Diallo	6	7
(Belgium) Joris De Loore	0	5

=== Top half ===
First round
1	(Austria) D Thiem	7^{7}	6
(Ukraine) V Sachko	6^{5}	3
(Canada) G Diallo	7	6
SE	(United Kingdom) A Fery	5	1
(Croatia) D Prižmić	0	3
(Slovakia) L Klein	6	6
(Finland) O Virtanen	7^{7}	1	6
5	(United Kingdom) L Broady	6^{5}	6	2
LL	(Australia) A Santillan	3	6	3
Q	(United States) M Damm	6	3	6
Q	(North Macedonia) K Ivanovski	7^{7}	6
Q	(Germany) P Gojowczyk	6^{3}	2
LL	(France) M Martineau	4	6	6
(Czech Republic) J Menšík	6	4	1
WC	(Slovakia) L Pokorný	6^{4}	3
7	(United States) M Cressy	7^{7}	6

Second round
1	(Austria) D Thiem	1	6	6^{5}
(Canada) G Diallo	6	4	7^{7}
(Slovakia) L Klein	6	6
(Finland) O Virtanen	4	4
Q	(United States) M Damm	6	6
Q	(North Macedonia) K Ivanovski	3	4
LL	(France) M Martineau	6^{4}	3
7	(United States) M Cressy	7^{7}	6

Quarterfinals
(Canada) G Diallo	3	7^{7}	6
(Slovakia) L Klein	6	6^{5}	2
Q	(United States) M Damm	6	7^{8}
7	(United States) M Cressy	4	6^{6}

Semifinals
(Canada) G Diallo	7^{7}	6
Q	(United States) M Damm	6^{5}	2

=== Bottom half ===
First round
8	(Slovakia) A Molčan	7	4	3
(Belgium) J De Loore	5	6	6
SE	(Lebanon) B Hassan	6	6
(Italy) S Travaglia	3	2
Q	(Austria) D Novak	6^{6}	0
Q	(Ukraine) I Marchenko	7^{8}	6
WC	(Slovakia) N Gombos	6	7^{7}
3	(France) B Bonzi	4	6^{5}
6	(Hungary) Z Piros	7	3	6
(Austria) F Misolic	5	6	3
(Italy) G Zeppieri	2	0
(Bosnia and Herzegovina) D Džumhur	6	6
WC	(Czech Republic) A Paulson	6	6
Q	(Romania) GA Boitan	4	3
(Italy) L Nardi	7^{7}	6
2	(Switzerland) D Stricker	6^{4}	3

Second round
(Belgium) J De Loore	6	6
SE	(Lebanon) B Hassan	3	4
Q	(Ukraine) I Marchenko	4	6	7
WC	(Slovakia) N Gombos	6	3	5
6	(Hungary) Z Piros	3	1
(Bosnia and Herzegovina) D Džumhur	6	6
WC	(Czech Republic) A Paulson	7	4	3
(Italy) L Nardi	5	6	6

Quarterfinals
(Belgium) J De Loore	6	3	7^{7}
Q	(Ukraine) I Marchenko	3	6	6^{2}
(Bosnia and Herzegovina) D Džumhur	3	0
(Italy) L Nardi	6	6

Semifinals
(Belgium) J De Loore	7	7^{7}
(Italy) L Nardi	5	6^{5}
