= 2024 Slovak Open – Men's doubles =

Men's doubles
- 2024 Slovak Open

Final
- Champions: (Colombia) Nicolás Barrientos (United Kingdom) Julian Cash
- Runners-up: (Sweden) André Göransson (Netherlands) Sem Verbeek
- Score: 6–3, 6–4

Events
Singles	men	women
Doubles	men	women
- Slovak Open

Sriram Balaji and Andre Begemann were the defending champions but only Balaji chose to defend his title, partnering Guido Andreozzi. They lost in the quarterfinals to Lukáš Pokorný and Michael Vrbenský.

Nicolás Barrientos and Julian Cash won the title after defeating André Göransson and Sem Verbeek 6–3, 6–4 in the final.

== Seeds ==
1. (Colombia) Nicolás Barrientos / (United Kingdom) Julian Cash (champions)
2. (Germany) Constantin Frantzen / (Germany) Hendrik Jebens (quarterfinals)
3. (Kazakhstan) Aleksandr Nedovyesov / (Mexico) Miguel Ángel Reyes-Varela (first round)
4. (Argentina) Guido Andreozzi / (India) Sriram Balaji (quarterfinals)

== Draw ==
Key

- Q = Qualifier
- WC = Wild card
- LL = Lucky loser
- Alt = Alternate
- ITF = ITF entry
- PR = Protected ranking
- SR = Special ranking
- SE = Special exempt
- JE = Junior exempt
- JR = Junior Accelerator Programme entrant
- CO = College Accelerator Programme entrant
- NG = Next Gen Accelerator Program entrant
- w/o = Walkover
- r = Retired
- d = Defaulted

=== Draw ===
First round
1	(Colombia) N Barrientos (United Kingdom) J Cash	7^{11}	3	[10]
(Monaco) R Arneodo (France) T Arribagé	6^{9}	6	[6]
(Germany) J Schnaitter (Germany) M Wallner	7	4	[10]
(Romania) V Cornea (Ukraine) D Molchanov	5	6	[4]
3	(Kazakhstan) A Nedovyesov (Mexico) M Reyes-Varela	5	3
(Netherlands) R Haase (Austria) L Miedler	7	6
(India) RC Bollipalli (India) A Kadhe	6	6
(India) J Nedunchezhiyan (India) VS Prashanth	4	4
WC	(Slovakia) M Karol (Slovakia) Tomáš Lánik	4	6	[8]
WC	(Slovakia) L Pokorný (Czech Republic) M Vrbenský	6	4	[10]
(Portugal) F Cabral (Netherlands) M Middelkoop	3	7^{7}	[6]
4	(Argentina) G Andreozzi (India) S Balaji	6	6^{2}	[10]
(Sweden) A Göransson (Netherlands) S Verbeek	6	6
(Czech Republic) P Nouza (Czech Republic) P Rikl	4	4
(Tunisia) S Mansouri (Australia) J-P Smith	3	4
2	(Germany) C Frantzen (Germany) H Jebens	6	6

Quarterfinals
1	(Colombia) N Barrientos (United Kingdom) J Cash	7^{12}	6
(Germany) J Schnaitter (Germany) M Wallner	6^{10}	1
(Netherlands) R Haase (Austria) L Miedler	5	4
(India) RC Bollipalli (India) A Kadhe	7	6
WC	(Slovakia) L Pokorný (Czech Republic) M Vrbenský	6	7
4	(Argentina) G Andreozzi (India) S Balaji	2	5
(Sweden) A Göransson (Netherlands) S Verbeek	7	7^{7}
2	(Germany) C Frantzen (Germany) H Jebens	5	6^{2}

Semifinals
1	(Colombia) N Barrientos (United Kingdom) J Cash	2
(India) RC Bollipalli (India) A Kadhe	4^{r}
WC	(Slovakia) L Pokorný (Czech Republic) M Vrbenský	2	4
(Sweden) A Göransson (Netherlands) S Verbeek	6	6

Final
1	(Colombia) N Barrientos (United Kingdom) J Cash	6	6
(Sweden) A Göransson (Netherlands) S Verbeek	3	4
