= 2022 Championnats Banque Nationale de Granby – Men's doubles =

Men's doubles
- 2022 Championnats Banque Nationale de Granby

Final
- Champions: (United Kingdom) Julian Cash (United Kingdom) Henry Patten
- Runners-up: (France) Jonathan Eysseric (New Zealand) Artem Sitak
- Score: 6–3, 6–2

Events
Singles	men	women
Doubles	men	women
- Challenger de Granby

André Göransson and Sem Verbeek were the defending champions but chose not to defend their title.

Julian Cash and Henry Patten won the title after defeating Jonathan Eysseric and Artem Sitak 6–3, 6–2 in the final.

== Seeds ==
1. (Mexico) Hans Hach Verdugo / (Australia) Luke Saville (semifinals)
2. (United States) Evan King / (France) Fabien Reboul (quarterfinals)
3. (France) Jonathan Eysseric / (New Zealand) Artem Sitak (final)
4. (United Kingdom) Julian Cash / (United Kingdom) Henry Patten (champions)

== Draw ==
Key

- Q = Qualifier
- WC = Wild card
- LL = Lucky loser
- Alt = Alternate
- ITF = ITF entry
- PR = Protected ranking
- SR = Special ranking
- SE = Special exempt
- JE = Junior exempt
- JR = Junior Accelerator Programme entrant
- CO = College Accelerator Programme entrant
- NG = Next Gen Accelerator Program entrant
- w/o = Walkover
- r = Retired
- d = Defaulted

First round
1	(Mexico) H Hach Verdugo (Australia) L Saville	6	7^{7}
WC	(Canada) Aurel Ciocanu (Canada) Sid Donarski	1	6^{3}
(Brazil) M Demoliner (Greece) Pe Tsitsipas	6^{5}	7	[8]
(Canada) K Stevenson (Australia) E Winter	7^{7}	5	[10]
3	(France) J Eysseric (New Zealand) A Sitak	6	6
(United States) A Ayeni (United States) Roy Smith	4	4
(Canada) JC Aguilar (Canada) L Draxl	6^{4}	7^{7}	[10]
(United States) Colin Markes (Republic of Ireland) O O'Hoisin	7^{7}	6^{3}	[8]
(Tunisia) A Dougaz (Lebanon) H Habib	6^{4}	5
(United States) Ezekiel Clark (United States) Kyle Seelig	7^{7}	7
WC	(Canada) Stefan Simeunovic (Canada) Marko Stakusic	1	3
4	(United Kingdom) J Cash (United Kingdom) H Patten	6	6
(United States) N Chappell (United Kingdom) A McHugh	2	4
(Philippines) R Gonzales (United States) R Stalder	6	6
(Canada) J Boulais (France) C Chidekh	6	4	[3]
2	(United States) E King (France) F Reboul	4	6	[10]

Quarterfinals
1	(Mexico) H Hach Verdugo (Australia) L Saville	6	6
(Canada) K Stevenson (Australia) E Winter	3	2
3	(France) J Eysseric (New Zealand) A Sitak	7	6
(Canada) JC Aguilar (Canada) L Draxl	5	4
(United States) E Clark (United States) K Seelig	3	7^{7}	[5]
4	(United Kingdom) J Cash (United Kingdom) H Patten	6	6^{5}	[10]
(Philippines) R Gonzales (United States) R Stalder	6	4	[10]
2	(United States) E King (France) F Reboul	4	6	[6]

Semifinals
1	(Mexico) H Hach Verdugo (Australia) L Saville	6	6^{6}	[8]
3	(France) J Eysseric (New Zealand) A Sitak	4	7^{8}	[10]
4	(United Kingdom) J Cash (United Kingdom) H Patten	6	7^{7}
(Philippines) R Gonzales (United States) R Stalder	3	6^{3}

Final
3	(France) J Eysseric (New Zealand) A Sitak	3	2
4	(United Kingdom) J Cash (United Kingdom) H Patten	6	6
