= 2022 Slovak Open – Men's singles =

Men's singles
- 2022 Slovak Open

Final
- Champion: (Hungary) Márton Fucsovics
- Runner-up: (Hungary) Fábián Marozsán
- Score: 6–2, 6–4

Events
Singles	men	women
Doubles	men	women
- Slovak Open

Tallon Griekspoor was the defending champion but chose not to defend his title.

Márton Fucsovics won the title after defeating Fábián Marozsán 6–2, 6–4 in the final.

== Seeds ==
1. (China) Zhang Zhizhen (first round)
2. (Hungary) Márton Fucsovics (champion)
3. (Slovakia) Norbert Gombos (quarterfinals)
4. (Czech Republic) Tomáš Macháč (semifinals)
5. (Netherlands) Tim van Rijthoven (quarterfinals)
6. (Austria) Jurij Rodionov (second round, retired)
7. (Netherlands) Jelle Sels (first round)
8. (Slovakia) Jozef Kovalík (second round)

== Draw ==
Key

- Q = Qualifier
- WC = Wild card
- LL = Lucky loser
- Alt = Alternate
- ITF = ITF entry
- PR = Protected ranking
- SR = Special ranking
- SE = Special exempt
- JE = Junior exempt
- JR = Junior Accelerator Programme entrant
- CO = College Accelerator Programme entrant
- NG = Next Gen Accelerator Program entrant
- w/o = Walkover
- r = Retired
- d = Defaulted

=== Finals ===
Semifinals
Q	(Turkey) Cem İlkel	2	7^{8}	3
(Hungary) Fábián Marozsán	6	6^{6}	6
4	(Czech Republic) Tomáš Macháč	6^{5}	6	3
2	(Hungary) Márton Fucsovics	7^{7}	2	6

Final
(Hungary) Fábián Marozsán	2	4
2	(Hungary) Márton Fucsovics	6	6

=== Top half ===
First round
1	(China) Zh Zhang	6^{7}	5
Q	(Ukraine) I Marchenko	7^{9}	7
Q	(Turkey) C İlkel	6^{3}	6	6
(Belgium) Z Bergs	7^{7}	4	1
WC	(Slovakia) Peter Benjamín Privara	3	4
Q	(Norway) V Durasovic	6	6
A Shevchenko	2	4
5	(Netherlands) T van Rijthoven	6	6
3	(Slovakia) N Gombos	6	6
Q	(Germany) H Squire	4	3
(France) G Blancaneaux	6	6
(Hungary) Z Piros	2	0
(Hungary) F Marozsán	7^{7}	3	6
(Germany) J-L Struff	6^{5}	6	2
(Czech Republic) L Rosol	3	7^{7}	2
6	(Austria) J Rodionov	6	6^{4}	6

Second round
Q	(Ukraine) I Marchenko	6	5	3
Q	(Turkey) C İlkel	4	7	6
Q	(Norway) V Durasovic	7^{7}	6^{4}	4
5	(Netherlands) T van Rijthoven	6^{4}	7^{7}	6
3	(Slovakia) N Gombos	6	7^{7}
(France) G Blancaneaux	2	6^{4}
(Hungary) F Marozsán	6	2
6	(Austria) J Rodionov	3	0^{r}

Quarterfinals
Q	(Turkey) C İlkel	6	7
5	(Netherlands) T van Rijthoven	4	5
3	(Slovakia) N Gombos	1	6	3
(Hungary) F Marozsán	6	3	6

Semifinals
Q	(Turkey) C İlkel	2	7^{8}	3
(Hungary) F Marozsán	6	6^{6}	6

=== Bottom half ===
First round
8	(Slovakia) J Kovalík	7^{7}	7^{7}
(Czech Republic) V Kopřiva	6^{5}	6^{3}
(Slovakia) L Klein	6	6
Q	(Serbia) H Međedović	3	2
(Turkey) A Çelikbilek	6^{3}	1
Q	(Italy) S Travaglia	7^{7}	6
(United Kingdom) R Peniston	4	5
4	(Czech Republic) T Macháč	6	7
7	(Netherlands) J Sels	6^{9}	2
(Germany) M Marterer	7^{11}	6
(Italy) F Cobolli	6^{4}	0
(United Kingdom) L Broady	7^{7}	6
WC	(Czech Republic) J Menšík	3	4
(Germany) Y Hanfmann	6	6
WC	(Slovakia) L Pokorný	6^{3}	0
2	(Hungary) M Fucsovics	7^{7}	6

Second round
8	(Slovakia) J Kovalík	6^{5}	3
(Slovakia) L Klein	7^{7}	6
Q	(Italy) S Travaglia	4	6^{4}
4	(Czech Republic) T Macháč	6	7^{7}
(Germany) M Marterer	4	7^{7}	6
(United Kingdom) L Broady	6	6^{3}	2
(Germany) Y Hanfmann	2	5
2	(Hungary) M Fucsovics	6	7

Quarterfinals
(Slovakia) L Klein	4	7^{7}	3
4	(Czech Republic) T Macháč	6	6^{5}	6
(Germany) M Marterer	4	1
2	(Hungary) M Fucsovics	6	6

Semifinals
4	(Czech Republic) T Macháč	6^{5}	6	3
2	(Hungary) M Fucsovics	7^{7}	2	6
