= 2023 Slovak Open – Women's doubles =

Women's doubles
- 2023 Slovak Open

Final
- Champions: (France) Estelle Cascino (Czech Republic) Jesika Malečková
- Runners-up: (Czech Republic) Denisa Hindová (Czech Republic) Karolína Kubáňová
- Score: 6–3, 6–2

Events
Singles	men	women
Doubles	men	women
- Slovak Open

Jesika Malečková and Renata Voráčová were the defending champions, but chose not to defend the title together. Voráčová partnered Katarína Kužmová but lost in the quarterfinals to Alevtina Ibragimova and Ella Seidel.

Malečková partnered Estelle Cascino and successfully defended her title, defeating Denisa Hindová and Karolína Kubáňová in the final, 6–3, 6–2.

== Seeds ==
1. Alena Fomina-Klotz / Ekaterina Yashina (first round)
2. (France) Estelle Cascino / (Czech Republic) Jesika Malečková (champions)
3. (Czech Republic) Denisa Hindová / (Czech Republic) Karolína Kubáňová (final)
4. (Slovakia) Katarína Kužmová / (Czech Republic) Renata Voráčová (quarterfinals)

== Draw ==
Key

- Q = Qualifier
- WC = Wild card
- LL = Lucky loser
- Alt = Alternate
- ITF = ITF entry
- PR = Protected ranking
- SR = Special ranking
- SE = Special exempt
- JE = Junior exempt
- JR = Junior Accelerator Programme entrant
- CO = College Accelerator Programme entrant
- NG = Next Gen Accelerator Program entrant
- w/o = Walkover
- r = Retired
- d = Defaulted

=== Draw ===
First round
1	A Fomina-Klotz; E Yashina	4	6^{1}
WC	(Slovakia) N Daubnerová (Slovakia) M Pohánková	6	7^{7}
(Slovakia) A Jašková (Czech Republic) J Štruplová	1	2
(Czech Republic) N Bartůňková (Czech Republic) A Kučmová	6	6
3	(Czech Republic) D Hindová (Czech Republic) K Kubáňová	6	6
Alt	(Czech Republic) D Hrdinková (Slovakia) L Svatíková	4	2
(Romania) IG Ghioroaie (Hungary) AK Tóth	6	1	[10]
(Slovakia) R Jamrichová (Slovakia) N Vargová	4	6	[8]
A Ibragimova (Germany) E Seidel	6	6
WC	(Slovakia) I Balus (Slovakia) E Méri	3	2
WC	(Slovakia) M Mayerová (Slovakia) E Mravcová	2	3
4	(Slovakia) K Kužmová (Czech Republic) R Voráčová	6	6
(Switzerland) K Kozakova (Czech Republic) L Ševčíková	2	2
(Slovakia) K Strešnáková (Slovakia) R Zelníčková	6	6
S Lansere (Slovakia) R Šramková	7^{8}	3	[4]
2	(France) E Cascino (Czech Republic) J Malečková	6^{6}	6	[10]

Quarterfinals
WC	(Slovakia) N Daubnerová (Slovakia) M Pohánková	w/o
(Czech Republic) N Bartůňková (Czech Republic) A Kučmová
3	(Czech Republic) D Hindová (Czech Republic) K Kubáňová	2	6	[10]
(Romania) IG Ghioroaie (Hungary) AK Tóth	6	4	[8]
A Ibragimova (Germany) E Seidel	7	6
4	(Slovakia) K Kužmová (Czech Republic) R Voráčová	5	4
(Slovakia) K Strešnáková (Slovakia) R Zelníčková	2	6^{6}
2	(France) E Cascino (Czech Republic) J Malečková	6	7^{8}

Semifinals
WC	(Slovakia) N Daubnerová (Slovakia) M Pohánková	4	2
3	(Czech Republic) D Hindová (Czech Republic) K Kubáňová	6	6
A Ibragimova (Germany) E Seidel	4	4
2	(France) E Cascino (Czech Republic) J Malečková	6	6

Final
3	(Czech Republic) D Hindová (Czech Republic) K Kubáňová	3	2
2	(France) E Cascino (Czech Republic) J Malečková	6	6
