= 2022 Championnats Banque Nationale de Granby – Men's singles =

Men's singles
- 2022 Championnats Banque Nationale de Granby

Final
- Champion: (Canada) Gabriel Diallo
- Runner-up: (China) Shang Juncheng
- Score: 7–5, 7–6^{(7–5)}

Events
Singles	men	women
Doubles	men	women
- Challenger de Granby

Ernesto Escobedo was the defending champion but chose not to defend his title.

Gabriel Diallo won the title after defeating Shang Juncheng 7–5, 7–6^{(7–5)} in the final.

== Seeds ==
1. (France) Arthur Rinderknech (withdrew)
2. (Czech Republic) Jiří Veselý (first round)
3. (Australia) Jordan Thompson (quarterfinals)
4. (United States) Stefan Kozlov (withdrew)
5. (France) Ugo Humbert (quarterfinals)
6. (China) Shang Juncheng (final)
7. (Germany) Cedrik-Marcel Stebe (second round)
8. (Dominican Republic) Nick Hardt (withdrew)
9. (Japan) Hiroki Moriya (semifinals)
10. (Colombia) Nicolás Mejía (quarterfinals)

== Draw ==
Key

- Q = Qualifier
- WC = Wild card
- LL = Lucky loser
- Alt = Alternate
- ITF = ITF entry
- PR = Protected ranking
- SR = Special ranking
- SE = Special exempt
- JE = Junior exempt
- JR = Junior Accelerator Programme entrant
- CO = College Accelerator Programme entrant
- NG = Next Gen Accelerator Program entrant
- w/o = Walkover
- r = Retired
- d = Defaulted

=== Finals ===
Semifinals
WC	(Canada) Gabriel Diallo	6	6
9	(Japan) Hiroki Moriya	3	4
6	(China) Shang Juncheng	6	6
Q	(United States) Aidan Mayo	3	4

Final
WC	(Canada) Gabriel Diallo	7	7^{7}
6	(China) Shang Juncheng	5	6^{5}

=== Top half ===
First round
LL	(Republic of Ireland) O O'Hoisin	6	3	5
(United States) O Kumar	1	6	7
(Tunisia) A Dougaz	6	7^{7}
Q	(United States) A Ayeni	3	6^{1}
Q	(Canada) D Martin	5	1
WC	(Canada) G Diallo	7	6
(United States) U Blanch	7^{7}	3	4
7	(Germany) C-M Stebe	6^{4}	6	6
9	(Japan) H Moriya	4	6	6
(United Kingdom) A McHugh	6	4	4
Q	(Australia) L Saville	2	6	2
Alt	(United States) S Kirchheimer	6	4	6
(United States) N Chappell	1	7^{8}	6^{4}
(Lebanon) H Habib	6	6^{6}	7^{7}
(United States) E Zhu	2	0
5	(France) U Humbert	6	6

Second round
(United States) O Kumar	6	4	2
(Tunisia) A Dougaz	3	6	6
WC	(Canada) G Diallo	6	4	7^{7}
7	(Germany) C-M Stebe	4	6	6^{2}
9	(Japan) H Moriya	6	6
Alt	(United States) S Kirchheimer	4	4
(Lebanon) H Habib	3	3
5	(France) U Humbert	6	6

Quarterfinals
(Tunisia) A Dougaz	6	3	6^{5}
WC	(Canada) G Diallo	3	6	7^{7}
9	(Japan) H Moriya	7^{7}	4	7
5	(France) U Humbert	6^{4}	6	5

Semifinals
WC	(Canada) G Diallo	6	6
9	(Japan) H Moriya	3	4

=== Bottom half ===
First round
6	(China) J Shang	6	6
WC	(Canada) Marko Stakusic	4	4
Q	(United States) Colin Markes	7^{7}	3	6
(United States) Ezekiel Clark	6^{4}	6	4
Q	(Canada) J Boulais	7^{7}	6
(France) C Chidekh	6^{5}	2
(Canada) L Draxl	5	1
3	(Australia) J Thompson	7	6
10	(Colombia) N Mejía	6	6
WC	(Canada) JC Aguilar	2	3
(France) M Janvier	7^{7}	7^{8}
Alt	(United States) S Bangoura	6^{5}	6^{6}
(United Kingdom) H Patten	6	6
(United States) Kyle Seelig	4	3
Q	(United States) A Mayo	4	7	6
2	(Czech Republic) J Veselý	6	5	4

Second round
6	(China) J Shang	6	6
Q	(United States) C Markes	2	2
Q	(Canada) J Boulais	6	4	6^{7}
3	(Australia) J Thompson	2	6	7^{9}
10	(Colombia) N Mejía	6	6
(France) M Janvier	1	4
(United Kingdom) H Patten	2	2
Q	(United States) A Mayo	6	6

Quarterfinals
6	(China) J Shang	7	6
3	(Australia) J Thompson	5	4
10	(Colombia) N Mejía	4	6	4
Q	(United States) A Mayo	6	3	6

Semifinals
6	(China) J Shang	6	6
Q	(United States) A Mayo	3	4
