= 2023 Slovak Open – Men's doubles =

Men's doubles
- 2023 Slovak Open

Final
- Champions: (India) Sriram Balaji (Germany) Andre Begemann
- Runners-up: (Kazakhstan) Andrey Golubev (Ukraine) Denys Molchanov
- Score: 6–3, 5–7, [10–8]

Events
Singles	men	women
Doubles	men	women
- Slovak Open

Denys Molchanov and Aleksandr Nedovyesov were the defending champions but only Molchanov chose to defend his title, partnering Andrey Golubev. Molchanov lost in the final to Sriram Balaji and Andre Begemann.

Balaji and Begemann won the title after defeating Golubev and Molchanov 6–3, 5–7, [10–8] in the final.

== Seeds ==
1. (Monaco) Romain Arneodo / (Austria) Sam Weissborn (quarterfinals)
2. (Uruguay) Ariel Behar / (Czech Republic) Adam Pavlásek (semifinals)
3. (Kazakhstan) Andrey Golubev / (Ukraine) Denys Molchanov (final)
4. (Germany) Constantin Frantzen / (Germany) Hendrik Jebens (semifinals)

== Draw ==
Key

- Q = Qualifier
- WC = Wild card
- LL = Lucky loser
- Alt = Alternate
- ITF = ITF entry
- PR = Protected ranking
- SR = Special ranking
- SE = Special exempt
- JE = Junior exempt
- JR = Junior Accelerator Programme entrant
- CO = College Accelerator Programme entrant
- NG = Next Gen Accelerator Program entrant
- w/o = Walkover
- r = Retired
- d = Defaulted

First round
1	(Monaco) R Arneodo (Austria) S Weissborn	1	6	[10]
(Finland) P Niklas-Salminen (Netherlands) B Stevens	6	3	[6]
PR	(India) S Balaji (Germany) A Begemann	6	3	[10]
(Czech Republic) A Paulson (Ukraine) V Sachko	3	6	[6]
4	(Germany) C Frantzen (Germany) H Jebens	6	6
(Netherlands) S Arends (Netherlands) M Veldheer	3	2
WC	(Slovakia) M Karol (Slovakia) Peter Benjamín Privara	6	3	[10]
(France) T Arribagé (France) L Sanchez	4	6	[4]
WC	(Slovakia) L Pokorný (Slovakia) I Zelenay	6^{5}	6^{3}
I Liutarevich (Ukraine) V Manafov	7^{7}	7^{7}
(Greece) Pe Tsitsipas (Netherlands) S Verbeek	6^{2}	4
3	(Kazakhstan) A Golubev (Ukraine) D Molchanov	7^{7}	6
(India) Y Bhambri (Austria) P Oswald	6	6
(Poland) K Drzewiecki (Poland) S Walków	2	3
(Czech Republic) R Jebavý (Czech Republic) P Nouza	6^{4}	3
2	(Uruguay) A Behar (Czech Republic) A Pavlásek	7^{7}	6

Quarterfinals
1	(Monaco) R Arneodo (Austria) S Weissborn	6^{2}	6	[8]
PR	(India) S Balaji (Germany) A Begemann	7^{7}	3	[10]
4	(Germany) C Frantzen (Germany) H Jebens	4	6	[12]
WC	(Slovakia) M Karol (Slovakia) PB Privara	6	3	[10]
I Liutarevich (Ukraine) V Manafov	7^{9}	6^{3}	[15]
3	(Kazakhstan) A Golubev (Ukraine) D Molchanov	6^{7}	7^{7}	[17]
(India) Y Bhambri (Austria) P Oswald	6^{4}	6	[8]
2	(Uruguay) A Behar (Czech Republic) A Pavlásek	7^{7}	4	[10]

Semifinals
PR	(India) S Balaji (Germany) A Begemann	7^{7}	7
4	(Germany) C Frantzen (Germany) H Jebens	6^{4}	5
3	(Kazakhstan) A Golubev (Ukraine) D Molchanov	6	6
2	(Uruguay) A Behar (Czech Republic) A Pavlásek	3	3

Final
PR	(India) S Balaji (Germany) A Begemann	6	5	[10]
3	(Kazakhstan) A Golubev (Ukraine) D Molchanov	3	7	[8]
