= 2022 Championnats Banque Nationale de Granby =

Professional tennis tournament held in Canada

- Date: 21–28 August 2022
- Edition: 27th (men); 10th (women)
- Category: ATP Challenger 80; WTA 250
- Prize money: $53,120 (men) $251,750 (women)
- Surface: Hard
- Location: Granby, Quebec, Canada

Champions

Men's singles
- (Canada) Gabriel Diallo

Women's singles
- Daria Kasatkina

Men's doubles
- (United Kingdom) Julian Cash / (United Kingdom) Henry Patten

Women's doubles
- (United Kingdom) Alicia Barnett (United Kingdom) Olivia Nicholls
- Championnats de Granby

The 2022 Championnats Banque Nationale de Granby was a professional tennis tournament played on outdoor hard courts. It was the twenty-seventh (men) and tenth (women) editions of the tournament, which was part of the 2022 ATP Challenger Tour and a WTA 250 tournament on the 2022 WTA Tour. It took place in Granby, Quebec, Canada between 21 and 28 August 2022. This year marked the first year the tournament was upgraded to a WTA Tour tournament from an ITF Women's World Tennis Tour tournament.

== Champions ==
=== Men's singles ===
- (Canada) Gabriel Diallo def. (China) Shang Juncheng 7–5, 7–6^{(7–5)}.

=== Women's singles ===
- Daria Kasatkina def. (Australia) Daria Saville, 6–4, 6–4.

This was Kasatkina's sixth WTA Tour title, and second of the year.

=== Men's doubles ===
- (United Kingdom) Julian Cash / (United Kingdom) Henry Patten def. (France) Jonathan Eysseric / (New Zealand) Artem Sitak, 6–3, 6–2.

=== Women's doubles ===
- (United Kingdom) Alicia Barnett / (United Kingdom) Olivia Nicholls def. (United Kingdom) Harriet Dart / (Netherlands) Rosalie van der Hoek, 5–7, 6–3, [10–1]

== Men's singles main-draw entrants ==
=== Seeds ===
Country	Player	Rank^{1}	Seed
~~FRA~~	~~Arthur Rinderknech~~	~~64~~	~~1~~
CZE	Jiří Veselý	67	2
AUS	Jordan Thompson	106	3
~~USA~~	~~Stefan Kozlov~~	~~113~~	~~4~~
FRA	Ugo Humbert	155	5
CHN	Shang Juncheng	245	6
GER	Cedrik-Marcel Stebe	250	7
~~DOM~~	~~Nick Hardt~~	~~268~~	~~8~~
JPN	Hiroki Moriya	286	9
COL	Nicolás Mejía	289	10

- ^{1} Rankings are as of August 15, 2022.

=== Other entrants ===
The following players received wildcards into the singles main draw:

- (Canada) Juan Carlos Aguilar
- (Canada) Gabriel Diallo
- (Canada) Marko Stakusic

The following players received entry into the singles main draw as alternates:

- (United States) Sekou Bangoura
- (United States) Strong Kirchheimer

The following players received entry from the qualifying draw:

- (United States) Alafia Ayeni
- (Canada) Justin Boulais
- (United States) Colin Markes
- (Canada) Dan Martin
- (United States) Aidan Mayo
- (Australia) Luke Saville

The following player received entry as a lucky loser:

- (Republic of Ireland) Osgar O'Hoisin

== Women's singles main-draw entrants ==
=== Seeds ===
Country	Player	Rank^{1}	Seed
	Daria Kasatkina	10	1
~~BEL~~	~~Alison Van Uytvanck~~	~~42~~	~~2~~
ITA	Jasmine Paolini	52	3
HUN	Anna Bondár	55	4
ESP	Nuria Párrizas Díaz	62	5
~~ITA~~	~~Lucia Bronzetti~~	~~66~~	~~6~~
SLO	Kaja Juvan	67	7
CZE	Tereza Martincová	71	8
AUS	Daria Saville	72	9
UKR	Marta Kostyuk	74	10

- ^{1} Rankings are as of 15 August 2022.

=== Other entrants ===
The following players received wildcards into the singles main draw:

- Daria Kasatkina
- (Canada) Victoria Mboko
- (Canada) Katherine Sebov

The following player received entry as an alternate:

- (United States) Jamie Loeb

The following players received entry from the qualifying draw:

- (Canada) Cadence Brace
- (Canada) Kayla Cross
- (Canada) Marina Stakusic
- (Switzerland) Lulu Sun

The following player received entry as a lucky loser:

- (Japan) Himeno Sakatsume

=== Withdrawals ===
Before the tournament

- (Italy) Lucia Bronzetti → replaced by (Japan) Himeno Sakatsume
- (Hungary) Dalma Gálfi → replaced by (Belgium) Greet Minnen
- (Brazil) Beatriz Haddad Maia → replaced by (Canada) Rebecca Marino
- (Croatia) Ana Konjuh → replaced by (Belgium) Maryna Zanevska
- (Netherlands) Arantxa Rus → replaced by (Australia) Jaimee Fourlis
- (Belgium) Alison Van Uytvanck → replaced by (United States) Jamie Loeb

== Women's doubles main-draw entrants ==
=== Seeds ===
Country	Player	Country	Player	Rank^{1}	Seed
POL	Alicja Rosolska	NZL	Erin Routliffe	69	1
ROU	Monica Niculescu	ROU	Raluca Olaru	99	2
HUN	Anna Bondár	BEL	Greet Minnen	105	3
UKR	Nadiia Kichenok	SVK	Tereza Mihalíková	133	4

- Rankings are as of August 15, 2022.

=== Other entrants ===
The following pairs received wildcards into the doubles main draw:

- (Canada) Cadence Brace / (Canada) Marina Stakusic
- (Canada) Kayla Cross / (Canada) Victoria Mboko

=== Withdrawals ===
Before the tournament

- (Norway) Ulrikke Eikeri / (United States) Catherine Harrison → replaced by (Norway) Ulrikke Eikeri / (Montenegro) Danka Kovinić
- (Australia) Storm Sanders / (Japan) Ena Shibahara → replaced by (Australia) Daria Saville / (Japan) Ena Shibahara
- (Hungary) Panna Udvardy / (Slovenia) Tamara Zidanšek → replaced by (Hungary) Tímea Babos / (United States) Angela Kulikov
- (Netherlands) Rosalie van der Hoek / (Belgium) Alison Van Uytvanck → replaced by (Poland) Paula Kania-Choduń / (Czech Republic) Renata Voráčová
