= 2022 Championnats Banque Nationale de Granby – Women's singles =

Women's singles
- 2022 Championnats Banque Nationale de Granby

Final
- Champion: Daria Kasatkina
- Runner-up: (Australia) Daria Saville
- Score: 6–4, 6–4

Events
Singles	men	women
Doubles	men	women
← 2019 ·	Championnats de Granby	· 2023 →

Daria Kasatkina defeated Daria Saville in the final, 6–4, 6–4 to win the singles tennis title at the 2022 Championnats de Granby.

Lizette Cabrera was the reigning champion from 2019, when the tournament was an ITF tournament, but chose to play in the US Open qualifying event instead.

== Seeds ==
1. Daria Kasatkina (champion)
2. (Belgium) Alison Van Uytvanck (withdrew)
3. (Italy) Jasmine Paolini (second round)
4. (Hungary) Anna Bondár (second round)
5. (Spain) Nuria Párrizas Díaz (quarterfinals)
6. (Italy) Lucia Bronzetti (withdrew)
7. (Slovenia) Kaja Juvan (first round)
8. (Czech Republic) Tereza Martincová (second round)
9. (Australia) Daria Saville (final)
10. (Ukraine) Marta Kostyuk (semifinals, withdrew)

== Draw ==
=== Key ===
- Q = Qualifier
- WC = Wild card
- LL = Lucky loser
- Alt = Alternate
- SE = Special exempt
- PR = Protected ranking
- ITF = ITF entry
- JE = Junior exempt
- w/o = Walkover
- r = Retired
- d = Defaulted
- SR = Special ranking

=== Finals ===
Semifinals
1/WC	Daria Kasatkina	6	6
(France) Diane Parry	2	0
10	(Ukraine) Marta Kostyuk
9	(Australia) Daria Saville	w/o

Final
1/WC	Daria Kasatkina	6	6
9	(Australia) Daria Saville	4	4

=== Top half ===
First round
1/WC	D Kasatkina	6^{4}	6	6
(Belgium) G Minnen	7^{7}	4	2
(Montenegro) D Kovinić	6^{3}	2
(Poland) M Fręch	7^{7}	6
(United Kingdom) H Dart	6	7
(Belgium) M Zanevska	4	5
(Sweden) R Peterson	2	1
5	(Spain) N Párrizas Díaz	6	6
4	(Hungary) A Bondár	6	6
Q	(Canada) K Cross	3	4
(Argentina) N Podoroska	5	1
(Germany) T Maria	7	6
(France) D Parry	6	6
Q	(Switzerland) L Sun	4	2
(France) O Dodin	2	5
8	(Czech Republic) T Martincová	6	7

Second round
1/WC	D Kasatkina	6	6
(Poland) M Fręch	3	2
(United Kingdom) H Dart	2	4
5	(Spain) N Párrizas Díaz	6	6
4	(Hungary) A Bondár	3	2
(Germany) T Maria	6	6
(France) D Parry	6	7^{7}
8	(Czech Republic) T Martincová	3	6^{1}

Quarterfinals
1/WC	D Kasatkina	6	6
5	(Spain) N Párrizas Díaz	3	2
(Germany) T Maria	4	7^{8}	6^{4}
(France) D Parry	6	6^{6}	7^{7}

Semifinals
1/WC	D Kasatkina	6	6
(France) D Parry	2	0

=== Bottom half ===
First round
10	(Ukraine) M Kostyuk	6	7
(Slovenia) T Zidanšek	1	5
(Australia) J Fourlis	6	3	2
Q	(Canada) M Stakusic	4	6	6
(Canada) R Marino	6	6
WC	(Canada) V Mboko	3	3
LL	(Japan) H Sakatsume	6^{6}	4
3	(Italy) J Paolini	7^{8}	6
7	(Slovenia) K Juvan	5	3
Q	(Canada) C Brace	7	6
Alt	(United States) J Loeb	6^{4}	7^{7}	2
(China) Xiy Wang	7^{7}	6^{5}	6
(China) Xin Wang	6	4	0
WC	(Canada) K Sebov	3	6	6
(Slovakia) AK Schmiedlová	3	3
9	(Australia) D Saville	6	6

Second round
10	(Ukraine) M Kostyuk	6^{3}	6	6
Q	(Canada) M Stakusic	7^{7}	4	1
(Canada) R Marino	4	6	6
3	(Italy) J Paolini	6	1	2
Q	(Canada) C Brace	6^{4}	1
(China) Xiy Wang	7^{7}	6
WC	(Canada) K Sebov	1	0
9	(Australia) D Saville	6	6

Quarterfinals
10	(Ukraine) M Kostyuk	6	4	6
(Canada) R Marino	2	6	2
(China) Xiy Wang	3	0
9	(Australia) D Saville	6	6

Semifinals
10	(Ukraine) M Kostyuk
9	(Australia) D Saville	w/o

== Qualifying ==
=== Seeds ===
1. (Australia) Storm Sanders (withdrew)
2. (United States) Jamie Loeb (moved to main draw)
3. (Croatia) Jana Fett (qualifying competition)
4. (Hungary) Tímea Babos (withdrew, competing in Vancouver)
5. (Japan) Himeno Sakatsume (qualifying competition, lucky loser)
6. (Switzerland) Lulu Sun (qualified)
7. (India) Karman Thandi (first round)
8. (Norway) Ulrikke Eikeri (first round)

=== Qualifiers ===
1. (Canada) Marina Stakusic
2. (Canada) Kayla Cross
3. (Switzerland) Lulu Sun
4. (Canada) Cadence Brace

=== Lucky loser ===
1. (Japan) Himeno Sakatsume

=== Qualifying draw ===
==== First qualifier ====
First round
Alt	(New Zealand) Erin Routliffe	6	5	6
WC	(Canada) Bianca Fernandez	3	7	2
(Canada) Marina Stakusic	6	6
8	(Norway) Ulrikke Eikeri	3	2

Qualifying competition
Alt	(New Zealand) Erin Routliffe	2	7^{7}	1
(Canada) Marina Stakusic	6	6^{4}	6

==== Second qualifier ====
First round
Alt	(Slovakia) Tereza Mihalíková	4	2
WC	(Canada) Kayla Cross	6	6
(Japan) Nagi Hanatani	2	5
5	(Japan) Himeno Sakatsume	6	7

Qualifying competition
WC	(Canada) Kayla Cross	6	6
5	(Japan) Himeno Sakatsume	1	3

==== Third qualifier ====
First round
3	(Croatia) Jana Fett	6	7
(United Kingdom) Alicia Barnett	3	5
(Japan) Ena Shibahara	6	1	2
6	(Switzerland) Lulu Sun	3	6	6

Qualifying competition
3	(Croatia) Jana Fett	6^{3}	2
6	(Switzerland) Lulu Sun	7^{7}	6

==== Fourth qualifier ====
First round
Alt	(Ukraine) Nadiia Kichenok	6	7^{7}
(Australia) Olivia Tjandramulia	4	6^{5}
(Canada) Cadence Brace	6	2	6
7	(India) Karman Thandi	3	6	2

Qualifying competition
Alt	(Ukraine) Nadiia Kichenok	3	4
(Canada) Cadence Brace	6	6
