= Gabriel Diallo =

Canadian professional tennis player (born 2001)

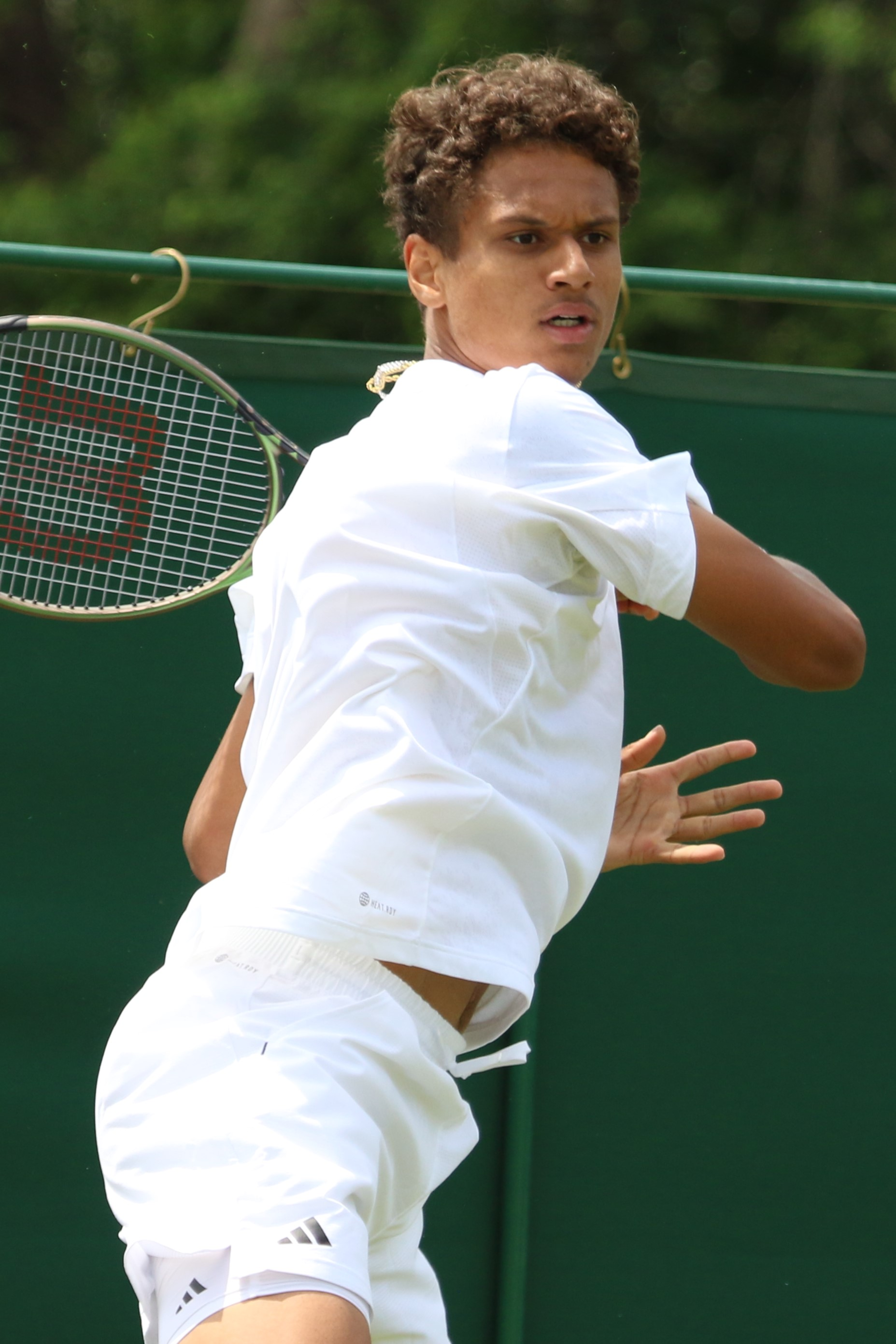
- Diallo at the 2023 Wimbledon Championships
- Full name: Gabriel Devonte James Diallo
- Country (sports): Canada
- Born: September 24, 2001 (age 24) Montreal, Quebec, Canada
- Height: 2.03 m (6 ft 8 in)
- Turned pro: 2023
- Plays: Right-handed (two-handed backhand)
- College: University of Kentucky
- Coach: Martin Laurendeau (-2025), Jonas Björkman (2026-), Johan Örtegren
- Prize money: US $3,408,686

Singles
- Career record: 50–58
- Career titles: 1
- Highest ranking: No. 33 (18 August 2025)
- Current ranking: No. 114 (31 August 2026)

Grand Slam singles results
- Australian Open: 2R (2025)
- French Open: 2R (2025)
- Wimbledon: 2R (2025, 2026)
- US Open: 3R (2024)

Doubles
- Career record: 4–13
- Career titles: 0
- Highest ranking: No. 321 (8 January 2024)
- Current ranking: No. 602 (31 August 2026)

Grand Slam doubles results
- French Open: 2R (2025)
- Wimbledon: 1R (2025)

Team competitions
- Davis Cup: W (2022); Record: 4–3
- Last updated on: 31 August 2026.

Gabriel Diallo (born September 24, 2001) is a Canadian professional tennis player. He has a career-high ATP singles ranking of world No. 33, achieved on 18 August 2025 and a doubles ranking of No. 321, achieved on 8 January 2024. He is currently the No. 3 singles player from Canada.

Diallo won one ATP title at the 2025 Libéma Open.

Diallo played college tennis at the University of Kentucky.

== Early life ==
Diallo was born in Montreal, Canada to a Guinean father, and Ukrainian mother who is a former handball player. Diallo speaks French, English and Russian and is learning Spanish.

== Professional career ==
=== 2022: Maiden Challenger title, ATP & top 250 debut, Davis Cup champion ===
In August, Diallo made his ATP debut in the qualifying competition as a wildcard at the National Bank Open in Montreal where he defeated James Duckworth in the first round.

Participating in the Granby Challenger as a wildcard, Diallo won 5 consecutive matches to claim his maiden title in only his fourth main-draw Challenger-level tournament. At 20 years old, he became the youngest Canadian champion on the Challenger Tour since Félix Auger-Aliassime won the Tashkent Challenger in 2018. As a result, Diallo rose to a career-high of No. 335 in the ATP rankings. He finished the year at a career-high ranking of No. 224 on 21 November 2022.

=== 2023–2024: Masters, Major debut & third round, top 100, maiden ATP final ===
After reaching the semifinals at the Challenger in Busan, South Korea where he lost to top seed Max Purcell, Diallo made his top 150 debut in the ATP rankings on 22 May 2023. The following month, he defeated Liam Broady and top seed Dan Evans of Great Britain on grass at the Surbiton Trophy to reach the quarterfinals, losing to eventual runner-up Jurij Rodionov.

In August 2023, No. 141, Diallo again defeated Dan Evans to win his first ATP Tour match and first at the Masters 1000 level at the National Bank Open in Toronto. In the second round, he lost to eventual runner-up Alex de Minaur. Later that month, Diallo won the doubles title at the Winnipeg Challenger, partnering Leandro Riedi.

At the Davis Cup Finals group stage in September 2023, Diallo recorded an upset victory over world No. 18 Lorenzo Musetti, winning in straight sets to give Canada the victory over Italy. He won his second Challenger title at the Slovak Open and reached the top 130 on 16 October 2023.

In May 2024, Diallo qualified for his first Grand Slam at the French Open, defeating Argentinians Genaro Alberto Olivieri and Marco Trungelliti and, in the third round of qualifying, Alexander Ritschard. In the first round of the main draw, he lost to Kei Nishikori in five sets.

In August 2024, ranked No. 144, Diallo qualified for the main draw of the US Open, making his debut, with wins over Sho Shimabukuro and two French players, Titouan Droguet and Valentin Royer. He defeated Jaume Munar and upset 24th seed Arthur Fils, his first two Grand Slam main-draw wins, to reach the third round for the first time in his career. As a result he moved up 40 spots to a new career-high of world No. 103 in the rankings on 9 September 2024. He lost to 14th seed Tommy Paul in four sets.

In October 2024, Diallo reached his maiden ATP Tour final at the Almaty Open, defeating Christopher O'Connell, Borna Ćorić, second seed Alejandro Tabilo, and fourth seed Francisco Cerúndolo. He lost in the final to third seed Karen Khachanov in three sets. As a result he reached the top 100 in the rankings at world No. 87 on 21 October 2024.

=== 2025: First Major win & ATP title, top 35 ===
Diallo made his debut at the clay Masters 1000, the Mutua Madrid Open, where he entered the main draw as a lucky loser, just as he did the previous month at the BNP Paribas Open and Miami Open. He recorded his first Masters wins on clay over Zizou Bergs, fellow lucky loser Kamil Majchrzak, Cameron Norrie, and 15th seed Grigor Dimitrov (saving three match points) to reach the quarterfinals at this level for the first time in his career. As a result, he reached the top 60 in the rankings on 5 May 2025. At the 2025 French Open Diallo pulled another upset, recording his first Grand Slam clay win over 18th seed Francisco Cerúndolo, his third top-20 career win.

At the 2025 Libéma Open Diallo won his maiden ATP title making him the seventh first-time ATP Tour champion for 2025. En route he defeated Australians Aleksandar Vukic, and sixth seed Jordan Thompson, saving two match points to reach the quarterfinals, recording his first ATP wins on grass. He then upset third seed and top 30 player Karen Khachanov to reach his first grass court semifinal and second overall, taking his revenge for the prior year loss in the Almaty final. Diallo reached his second ATP final and first on grass after defeating second seed and top 20 player Ugo Humbert. He became the first Canadian men’s singles finalist in ‘s-Hertogenbosch event history. He defeated Zizou Bergs in the final in straight sets and as a result reached the top 50 at world No. 44 in the singles rankings on 16 June 2025 and the top 35 on 21 July 2025.

At the 2025 Wimbledon Championships, Diallo defeated Daniel Altmaier to reach the second round, in which he lost to fifth seed Taylor Fritz in a five-set match lasting over three hours.

== Performance timelines ==
Key
W	F	SF	QF	#R	RR	Q#	P#	DNQ	A	Z#	PO	G	S	B	NMS	NTI	P	NH

(W) winner; (F) finalist; (SF) semifinalist; (QF) quarterfinalist; (#R) rounds 4, 3, 2, 1; (RR) round-robin stage; (Q#) qualification round; (P#) preliminary round; (DNQ) did not qualify; (A) absent; (Z#) Davis/Fed Cup Zonal Group (with number indication) or (PO) play-off; (G) gold, (S) silver or (B) bronze Olympic/Paralympic medal; (NMS) not a Masters tournament; (NTI) not a Tier I tournament; (P) postponed; (NH) not held; (SR) strike rate (events won / competed); (W–L) win–loss record.
To avoid confusion and double counting, these charts are updated at the conclusion of a tournament or when the player's participation has ended.

=== Singles ===
Current through the 2026 US Open.

Tournament	2022	2023	2024	2025	2026	SR	W–L	Win%
Grand Slam tournaments
Australian Open	A	Q1	Q3	2R	1R	0 / 2	1–2	33%
French Open	A	Q1	1R	2R	1R	0 / 3	1–3	25%
Wimbledon	A	Q2	Q2	2R	2R	0 / 2	2–2	50%
US Open	A	Q1	3R	2R	A	0 / 2	3–2	60%
Win–loss	0–0	0–0	2–2	4–4	1–3	0 / 9	7–9	44%
National representation
Davis Cup	W	QF	QF	G1		1 / 4	7–6	54%
ATP 1000 tournaments
Indian Wells Open	A	A	A	2R	3R	0 / 2	3–2	60%
Miami Open	A	A	Q1	2R	2R	0 / 2	2–2	50%
Monte-Carlo Masters	A	A	A	Q1	1R	0 / 1	0–1	0%
Madrid Open	A	A	A	QF	2R	0 / 2	4–2	67%
Italian Open	A	A	A	1R	A	0 / 1	0–1	0%
Canadian Open	Q2	2R	1R	3R	2R	0 / 4	3–4	43%
Cincinnati Open	A	A	A	3R	A	0 / 1	1–1	50%
Shanghai Masters	NH	A	1R	4R		0 / 2	2–2	50%
Paris Masters	A	A	A	2R		0 / 1	1–1	50%
Win–loss	0–0	1–1	0–2	11–8	4–5	0 / 16	16–16	50%
Career statistics
	2022	2023	2024	2025	2026	SR	W–L	Win %
Tournaments	0	4	7	24	18	Career total: 53		
Titles	0	0	0	1	0	Career total: 1		
Finals	0	0	1	1	0	Career total: 2		
Hard win–loss	0–1	3–5	8–6	14–17	6–10	0 / 33	31–39	44%
Clay win–loss	0–0	0–0	0–1	6–4	1–5	0 / 10	7–10	41%
Grass win–loss	0–0	0–1	0–1	9–3	3–4	1 / 10	12–9	57%
Overall win–loss	0–1	3–6	8–8	29–24	10–19	1 / 53	50–58	46%
Win %	0%	33%	50%	55%	34%	46.3%		
Year-end ranking	227	139	87	41		$3,408,686		

== ATP Tour finals ==
=== Singles: 2 (1 title, 1 runner-up) ===
Legend Grand Slam (0–0) ATP 1000 (0–0) ATP 500 (0–0) ATP 250 (1–1)	Finals by surface Hard (0–1) Clay (0–0) Grass (1–0)	Finals by setting Outdoor (1–0) Indoor (0–1)

Result	W–L	Date	Tournament	Tier	Surface	Opponent	Score
Loss	0–1	Oct 2024	Almaty Open, Kazakhstan	ATP 250	Hard (i)	Karen Khachanov	2–6, 7–5, 3–6
Win	1–1	Jun 2025	Libéma Open, Netherlands	ATP 250	Grass	(Belgium) Zizou Bergs	7–5, 7–6^{(10–8)}

== ATP Challenger Tour finals ==
=== Singles: 4 (3 titles, 1 runner-up) ===
Legend ATP Challenger Tour (3–1)	Finals by surface Hard (3–1) Clay (0–0)

Result	W–L	Date	Tournament	Tier	Surface	Opponent	Score
Win	1–0	Aug 2022	Championnats de Granby, Canada	Challenger	Hard	(China) Shang Juncheng	7–5, 7–6^{(7–5)}
Loss	1–1	Oct 2022	Fairfield Challenger, US	Challenger	Hard	(United States) Michael Mmoh	3–6, 2–6
Win	2–1	Oct 2023	Slovak Open, Slovakia	Challenger	Hard (i)	(Belgium) Joris De Loore	6–0, 7–5
Win	3–1	Jul 2024	Chicago Men's Challenger, US	Challenger	Hard	(China) Bu Yunchaokete	6–3, 7–6^{(7–3)}

=== Doubles: 1 (title) ===
Legend ATP Challenger Tour (1–0)

Result	W–L	Date	Tournament	Tier	Surface	Partner	Opponents	Score
Win	1–0	Aug 2023	Winnipeg Challenger, Canada	Challenger	Hard	(Switzerland) Leandro Riedi	(Canada) Taha Baadi (Canada) Juan Carlos Aguilar	6–2, 6–3

== ITF World Tennis Tour finals ==
=== Singles: 4 (2 titles, 2 runner-ups) ===
Legend ITF WTT (2–2)	Finals by surface Hard (2–2) Clay (0–0)

Result	W–L	Date	Tournament	Tier	Surface	Opponent	Score
Loss	0–1	Jun 2021	M15 Champaign, US	WTT	Hard	(Australia) Jason Kubler	2–6, 1–6
Loss	0–2	Nov 2021	M15 East Lansing, US	WTT	Hard	(United States) Raymond Sarmiento	6–4, 3–6, 4–6
Win	1–2	Jun 2022	M25 East Lansing, US	WTT	Hard	(United States) Andres Martin	6–3, 7–6^{(7–4)}
Win	2–2	Mar 2023	M25 Montreal, Canada	WTT	Hard (i)	(Germany) Henri Squire	7–6^{(7–5)}, 6–3

=== Doubles: 1 (runner-up) ===
Legend ITF WTT (0–1)

Result	W–L	Date	Tournament	Tier	Surface	Partner	Opponents	Score
Loss	0–1	Nov 2019	M15 East Lansing, US	WTT	Hard	(United Kingdom) Millen Hurrion	(United States) Jacob Dunbar (United Kingdom) David Fox	4–6, 6–7^{(3–7)}

== National and international representation ==
=== Team competitions finals: 1 (title) ===
Finals by tournament Davis Cup (1–0) Laver Cup (0–0) ATP Cup (0–0)	Finals by team Canada (1–0) World (0–0)

Result	Date	Tournament	Surface	Team	Partners	Opponent team	Opponents	Score
Win	Nov 2022	Davis Cup, Málaga	Hard (i)	Canada	Félix Auger-Aliassime; Denis Shapovalov; Vasek Pospisil; Alexis Galarneau	Australia	Alex de Minaur; Jordan Thompson; Thanasi Kokkinakis; Max Purcell; Matthew Ebden	2–0
