= Katarína Kužmová =

Slovak tennis player (born 2001)

- Country (sports): Slovakia
- Born: 7 August 2001 (age 25) Košice, Slovakia
- Plays: Right-handed (two-handed backhand)
- Prize money: $156,565

Singles
- Career record: 337–193
- Career titles: 15 ITF
- Highest ranking: No. 281 (22 June 2026)
- Current ranking: No. 282 (29 June 2026)

Doubles
- Career record: 222–93
- Career titles: 1 WTA Challenger
- Highest ranking: No. 165 (29 June 2026)
- Current ranking: No. 165 (29 June 2026)
- Last updated on: 29 June 2026.

Katarína Kužmová (born 7 August 2001) is a Slovak tennis player. She has a career-high singles ranking by the WTA of No. 281 and No. 165 in doubles, both achieved in June 2026.

== Early and personal life ==
Born to mother Ingrid and father Radovan, her father used to run a tennis club. Her older sister Viktoria is also a professional tennis player. She is from Košice.

== Career ==
In August 2019, with Serbian partner Elena Milovanović won the final of the ITF World Tennis Tour tournament in Tabarka on clay. Beating the Italian-Egyptian pair Beatrice Lombardo and Sandra Samir in three sets.

In 2020, she was called up for the first time into the Slovakia Fed Cup team alongside Viktória Kužmová, Rebecca Šramková and Anna Karolína Schmiedlová. She partnered her sister Viktória to defeat Markéta Vondroušová and Miriam Kolodziejová in a 3-2 friendly match defeat to Czechia.

In July 2021, she won her first W15 singles title in Solarino, with a 6–1, 6–1 win over Petra Csabi in the final.

In November 2025, she competed for Slovakia in the 2025 Billie Jean King Cup play-offs, playing doubles alongside Nina Vargová. Also in November, she reached the final of the doubles at the W75 event in Trnava, Slovakia, with her partner Nina Vargová.

In June 2026, she won the doubles title at the W50 event in Montemor-o-Novo, Portugal, alongside Australian partner Elena Micic.

== WTA 125 finals ==
=== Doubles: 1 (title) ===
Result	W–L	Date	Tournament	Surface	Partner	Opponents	Score
Win	1–0	Jun 2026	Figueira da Foz Open, Portugal	Hard	(Slovakia) Viktória Hrunčáková	(Australia) Elena Micic (France) Kristina Mladenovic	6–4, 6–4

== ITF Circuit finals ==
=== Singles: 26 (15 titles, 11 runner-ups) ===
Legend W50 tournaments W35 tournaments W15 tournaments	Finals by surface Hard (14–10) Clay (0–1) Carpet (1–0)

Result	W–L	Date	Tournament	Tier	Surface	Opponent	Score
Win	1–0	Nov 2021	ITF Solarino, Italy	W15	Carpet	(Czech Republic) Petra Csabi	6–1, 6–1
Loss	1–1	Jun 2022	ITF Banja Luka, Bosnia and Herzegovina	W15	Clay	(Czech Republic) Aneta Kučmová	3–6, 2–6
Loss	1–2	Sep 2022	ITF Sharm El Sheikh, Egypt	W15	Hard	Elena Pridankina	6–3, 4–6, 4–6
Loss	1–3	Feb 2023	ITF Sharm El Sheikh, Egypt	W15	Hard	(Czech Republic) Linda Klimovičová	5–7, 7–6^{(3)} , 2–6
Win	2–3	Mar 2023	ITF Sharm El Sheikh, Egypt	W15	Hard	(United Kingdom) Emilie Lindh	6–3, 6–4
Win	3–3	Mar 2023	ITF Sharm El Sheikh, Egypt	W15	Hard	(Hong Kong) Wu Ho-ching	6–2, 7–6^{(0)}
Loss	3–4	Mar 2023	ITF Sharm El Sheikh, Egypt	W15	Hard	Polina Iatcenko	4–6, 2–6
Win	4–4	May 2023	ITF Monastir, Tunisia	W15	Hard	(Japan) Hiroko Kuwata	3–6, 7–6^{(4)} , 6–3
Loss	4–5	Oct 2023	ITF Sharm El Sheikh, Egypt	W15	Hard	(Poland) Martyna Kubka	3–6, 0–6
Win	5–5	Oct 2023	ITF Sharm El Sheikh	W15	Hard	(Romania) Elena-Teodora Cadar	6–2, 6–0
Loss	5–6	Feb 2024	ITF Sharm El Sheikh	W15	Hard	(Romania) Elena-Teodora Cadar	3–6, 4–6
Win	6–6	Feb 2024	ITF Sharm El Sheikh	W15	Hard	(Hong Kong) Adithya Karunaratne	6–3, 6–1
Win	7–6	Feb 2024	ITF Sharm El Sheikh	W15	Hard	(Egypt) Sandra Samir	4–6, 7–5, 6–4
Loss	7–7	Mar 2024	ITF Sharm El Sheikh	W15	Hard	(Czech Republic) Anna Sisková	4–6, 6–4, 2–6
Loss	7–8	Apr 2024	ITF Sharm El Sheikh	W15	Hard	(Germany) Fabienne Gettwart	5–7, 2–6
Loss	7–9	May 2024	ITF Monastir, Tunisia	W15	Hard	(South Korea) Back Da-yeon	3–6, 0–6
Win	8–9	Sep 2024	ITF Trnava, Slovakia	W15	Hard	(Slovakia) Radka Zelníčková	6–4, 3–6, 6–3
Win	9–9	Oct 2024	ITF Sharm El Sheikh, Egypt	W15	Hard	(South Korea) Lee Eun-hye	0–6, 6–4, 6–4
Win	10–9	Feb 2025	ITF Sharm El Sheikh	W15	Hard	(United States) Carolyn Ansari	6–7^{(3)}, 6–3, 6–4
Win	11–9	Jul 2025	ITF Kayseri, Turkiye	W15	Hard	(United Kingdom) Esther Adeshina	6–4, 6–1
Win	12–9	Aug 2025	ITF Ankara, Turkiye	W15	Hard	(France) Dune Vaissaud	6–2, 6–0
Loss	12–10	Sep 2025	ITF Hurghada, Egypt	W15	Hard	(Egypt) Sandra Samir	0–2 ret.
Loss	12–11	Oct 2025	ITF Birmingham, United Kingdom	W35	Hard (i)	(United Kingdom) Mika Stojsavljevic	4–6, 0–6
Win	13–11	Jan 2026	ITF Oslo, Norway	W15	Hard (i)	(Sweden) Linea Bajraliu	6–7^{(4)}, 6–3, 6–1
Win	14–11	Feb 2026	ITF Sheffield, UK	W35	Hard (i)	(United Kingdom) Amelia Rajecki	1–6, 7–5, 6–3
Win	15–11	Apr 2026	ITF Sharm El Sheikh, Egypt	W15	Hard	(Bulgaria) Isabella Shinikova	6–1, 3–6, 7–5

=== Doubles: 50 (25 titles, 25 runner-ups) ===
Legend W75 tournaments W50 tournaments W25/35 tournaments W15 tournaments	Finals by surface Hard (20–22) Clay (3–3) Carpet (2–0)

Result	W–L	Date	Tournament	Tier	Surface	Partner	Opponents	Score
Loss	0–1	Apr 2019	ITF Sharm El Sheikh, Egypt	W15	Hard	(Kazakhstan) Zhibek Kulambayeva	(Thailand) Thasaporn Naklo (Thailand) Mananchaya Sawangkaew	3–6, 5–7
Win	1–1	Aug 2019	ITF Tabarka, Tunisia	W15	Hard	(Serbia) Elena Milovanović	(Egypt) Sandra Samir (Italy) Beatrice Lombardo	3–6, 6–3, [10–7]
Loss	1–2	Sep 2019	ITF Székesfehérvár, Hungary	W15	Clay	(Slovakia) Laura Svatiková	(Bosnia and Herzegovina) Nefisa Berberović (Norway) Malene Helgø	5–7, 1–6
Loss	1–3	Oct 2019	ITF Sharm El Sheikh, Egypt	W15	Hard	(Ukraine) Anastasiia Poplavska	(United States) Dasha Ivanova (Lithuania) Justina Mikulskytė	7–5, 4–6, [8–10]
Loss	1–4	Jun 2021	ITF Banja Luka, Bosnia and Herzegovina	W15	Clay	(Serbia) Elena Milovanović	(Italy) Nicole Fossa Huergo (Serbia) Bojana Marinković	2–6, 6–3, [8–10]
Win	2–4	Sep 2021	ITF Sozopol, Bulgaria	W15	Hard	(Russia) Ekaterina Reyngold	(Bulgaria) Katerina Dimitrova (Romania) Vanessa Popa Teiușanu	6–1, 6–4
Loss	2–5	Jun 2022	ITF Čatež ob Savi, Slovenia	W15	Clay	(Slovakia) Bianca Behúlová	(Chinese Taipei) Li Yu-yun; Anna Zyryanova	4–6, 5–7
Win	3–5	Jun 2022	ITF Banja Luka, Bosnia and Herzegovina	W15	Clay	(France) Nina Radovanovic	(Germany) Laura Böhner (Italy) Georgia Pinto	6–4, 6–2
Loss	3–6	Nov 2022	Trnava Indoor, Slovakia	W25	Hard (i)	(Czech Republic) Anna Sisková	(France) Alice Robbe; Ekaterina Makarova	3–6, 5–7
Loss	3–7	Nov 2022	Slovak Open, Slovakia	W60	Hard (i)	(Slovakia) Viktória Hrunčáková	(Czech Republic) Jesika Malečková (Czech Republic) Renata Voráčová	6–2, 5–7, [11–13]
Win	4–7	Jan 2023	ITF Sharm El Sheikh, Egypt	W15	Hard	Darya Shauha	(Romania) Sabina Dădaciu (Romania) Anca Todoni	6–3, 6–7^{(5)}, [10–3]
Loss	4–8	Mar 2023	ITF Sharm El Sheikh,	W15	Hard	Aglaya Fedorova	(Japan) Mei Hasegawa (Hong Kong) Wu Ho-ching	w/o
Win	5–8	Mar 2023	ITF Sharm El Sheikh	W15	Hard	Polina Iatcenko	(France) Pauline Courcoux (France) Camille Moga	6–4, 6–0
Win	6–8	Apr 2023	ITF Kursumlijka Banka, Serbia	W15	Clay	Ksenia Laskutova	(Switzerland) Leonie Küng (Serbia) Bojana Marinković	7–5, 6–3
Loss	6–9	May 2023	ITF Monastir, Tunisia	W15	Hard	(Slovakia) Salma Drugdová	(Canada) Louise Kwong (United States) Anna Ulyashchenko	w/o
Win	7–9	Jul 2023	ITF Monastir, Tunisia	W15	Hard	(Slovakia) Salma Drugdová	Aglaya Fedorova; Elizaveta Shebekina	w/o
Loss	7–10	Oct 2023	ITF Sharm El Sheikh, Egypt	W25	Hard	Ekaterina Shalimova	(Romania) Karola Bejenaru (France) Yasmine Mansouri	2–6, 6–7^{(5)}
Win	8–10	Dec 2023	ITF Sharm El Sheikh	W15	Hard	(Romania) Karola Bejenaru	Mariia Tkacheva; Daria Zelinskaya	6–3, 7–6^{(5)}
Win	9–10	Jan 2024	ITF Monastir, Tunisia	W25	Hard	(Slovakia) Nina Vargová	(United Kingdom) Madeleine Brooks (United Kingdom) Katy Dunne	6–4, 6–3
Loss	9–11	May 2024	ITF La Marsa, Tunisia	W35	Hard	(Slovakia) Radka Zelníčková	(Belgium) Magali Kempen (Belgium) Lara Salden	4–6, 6–7^{(5)}
Loss	9–12	Jun 2024	ITF La Marsa, Tunisia	W50	Hard	(France) Yasmine Mansouri	Aglaya Fedorova; Kira Pavlova	7–6^{(3)}, 1–6, [3–10]
Win	10–12	Jun 2024	ITF Monastir, Tunisia	W15	Hard	Mariia Tkacheva	(Lithuania) Patricija Paukštytė (Egypt) Merna Refaat	6–1, 6–1
Loss	10–13	Sep 2024	ITF Santarém, Portugal	W35	Hard	(United Kingdom) Sarah Beth Grey	Anastasiia Gureva (Slovakia) Radka Zelníčková	5–7, 1–6
Win	11–13	Sep 2024	ITF Trnava, Slovakia	W15	Hard	(Slovakia) Nina Vargová	(Czech Republic) Ivana Šebestová (Slovakia) Radka Zelníčková	7–5, 4–6, [10–6]
Loss	11–14	Oct 2024	Slovak Open Slovakia	W75	Hard (i)	(Slovakia) Nina Vargová	(Netherlands) Isabelle Haverlag; Elena Pridankina	5–7, 2–6
Loss	11–15	Oct 2024	ITF Sharm El Sheikh, Egypt	W15	Hard	(Egypt) Yasmin Ezzat	(South Korea) Kim Yu-jin (South Korea) Lee Eun-hye	6–4, 3–6, [9–11]
Win	12–15	Nov 2024	ITF Solarino, Italy	W35	Carpet	(Greece) Valentini Grammatikopoulou	Ksenia Laskutova (Italy) Federica Urgesi	6–3, 6–3
Win	13–15	Dec 2024	ITF Sharm El Sheikh, Egypt	W35	Hard	Polina Iatcenko	(Latvia) Kamilla Bartone (Romania) Andreea Prisăcariu	6–4, 6–4
Win	14–15	Dec 2024	ITF Sharm El Sheikh	W35	Hard	(Poland) Martyna Kubka	Varvara Panshina; Daria Zelinskaya	6–2, 7–6^{(2)}
Win	15–15	Mar 2025	ITF Solarino, Italy	W35	Carpet	(Slovakia) Viktória Hrunčáková	(Belgium) Sofia Costoulas (Germany) Katharina Hobgarski	6–7^{(4)}, 6–4, [10–5]
Win	16–15	Apr 2025	ITF Sharm El Sheikh, Egypt	W35	Hard	Mariia Tkacheva	Aliona Falei; Polina Iatcenko	6–4, 6–3
Win	17–15	May 2025	ITF Bol, Croatia	W35	Clay	(Netherlands) Stéphanie Visscher	(Brazil) Ana Candiotto; Daria Lodikova	6–4, 1–6, [11–9]
Loss	17–16	Jun 2025	ITF Kayseri, Turkiye	W15	Hard	Ksenia Laskutova	(France) Audrey Moutama (Italy) Lucrezia Musetti	3–6, 6–1, [7–10]
Loss	17–17	Aug 2025	ITF Bydgoszcz, Poland	W35	Hard	(Slovakia) Nina Vargová	(Poland) Zuzanna Pawlikowska (Greece) Sapfo Sakellaridi	2–6, 4–6
Win	18–17	Aug 2025	ITF Ankara, Turkiye	W15	Hard	Maria Golovina	(Colombia) María Herazo González (Ukraine) Anastasiya Zaparyniuk	7–5, 3–6, [10–4]
Win	19–17	Sep 2025	ITF Monastir, Tunisia	W35	Hard	(Poland) Martyna Kubka	(United States) Carolyn Ansari (Canada) Ariana Arseneault	7–5, 6–4
Loss	19–18	Oct 2025	ITF Birmingham, UK	W35	Hard (i)	(United Kingdom) Alicia Dudeney	(Czech Republic) Vendula Valdmannová (United Kingdom) Mimi Xu	3–6, 6–7^{(5)}
Loss	19–19	Nov 2025	Trnava Indoor, Slovakia	W75	Hard (i)	(Slovakia) Nina Vargová	(Czech Republic) Aneta Kučmová (Slovenia) Nika Radišić	4–6, 3–6
Win	20–19	Jan 2026	ITF Oslo, Norway	W15	Hard (i)	(United Kingdom) Amelia Rajecki	(Norway) Matylda Burylo (Germany) Ann Akasha Ceuca	6–4, 6–2
Loss	20–20	Feb 2026	ITF Sheffield, UK	W35	Hard (i)	(United Kingdom) Alicia Dudeney	(United Kingdom) Lauryn John-Baptiste (United Kingdom) Amelia Rajecki	6–4, 3–6, [8–10]
Win	21–20	Mar 2026	ITF Monastir, Tunisia	W35	Hard	(France) Yasmine Mansouri	(Poland) Weronika Falkowska (United States) Hibah Shaikh	7–5, 7–6^{(5)}
Loss	21–21	Apr 2026	ITF Sharm El Sheikh, Egypt	W15	Hard	(Uzbekistan) Laima Vladson	Valeriia Artemeva; Darya Kharlanova	3–6, 1–6
Win	22–21	Apr 2026	ITF Sharm El Sheikh	W35	Hard	(Poland) Martyna Kubka	(Egypt) Sandra Samir (Slovakia) Radka Zelníčková	6–4, 6–1
Win	23–21	May 2026	ITF Monastir, Tunisia	W35	Hard	(Poland) Weronika Falkowska	(France) Yasmine Mansouri (Serbia) Elena Milovanović	6–4, 6–3
Win	24–21	Jun 2026	ITF Montemor-o-Novo, Portugal	W50	Hard	(Australia) Elena Micic	(United Kingdom) Esther Adeshina (United Kingdom) Lauryn John-Baptiste	6–2, 4–6, [10–7]
Loss	24–22	Jun 2026	Guimarães Ladies Open, Portugal	W50	Hard	(Slovakia) Viktória Hrunčáková	(United States) Savannah Broadus (United States) Abigail Rencheli	3–6, 4–6
Loss	24–23	Jul 2026	ITF Aldershot, UK	W35	Hard	(United Kingdom) Emily Appleton	(United Kingdom) Savannah Dada-Mascoll (United Kingdom) Kristina Paskauskas	4–6, 3–6
Loss	24–24	Sep 2026	ITF Évora, Portugal	W50	Hard	(Australia) Elena Micic	(Canada) Ariana Arseneault (Canada) Raphaëlle Lacasse	3–6, 4–6
Loss	24–25	Oct 2026	ITF Monastir, Tunisia	W35	Hard	(Poland) Zuzanna Pawlikowska	(Czech Republic) Tereza Krejčová (Poland) Amelia Paszun	4–6, 4–6
Win	25–25	Oct 2026	ITF Monastir, Tunisia	W35	Hard	(Serbia) Elena Milovanović	(United States) Isabella Barrera Aguirre (China) Zhu Chenting	6–3, 6–2
