= Nina Vargová =

Slovak tennis player

- Country (sports): Slovakia
- Born: 9 September 2005 (age 21)
- Plays: Right (two-handed backhand)
- Prize money: $86,869

Singles
- Career record: 141–92
- Career titles: 8 ITF
- Highest ranking: No. 305 (24 February 2025)
- Current ranking: No. 420 (29 June 2026)

Doubles
- Career record: 109–58
- Career titles: 11 ITF
- Highest ranking: No. 192 (29 June 2026)
- Current ranking: No. 192 (29 June 2026)
- Last updated on: 7 July 2026.

Nina Vargová (9 September 2005) is a Slovak tennis player.

She has a career-high WTA singles ranking of 305, achieved on 24 February 2025. She also has a career-high doubles ranking of 192, achieved on 29 June 2026. She has won eight singles titles and eleven doubles titles on the ITF Women's World Tennis Tour.

== Career ==
In January 2024, she won her first singles title at the W15 tournament in Monastir, Tunisia. A week later, she and her partner Katarína Kužmová won their first doubles title of the year at the W35 event.

In March 2024, she won the singles and doubles titles at the W15 event held in Heraklion, Greece. A month later, she won her third singles title of the year at the W35 event in Hammamet, Tunisia.

In August 2024, she won both the singles and doubles titles at a W35 event held in Brașov, Romania.

In February 2025, she reached the singles final at a W35 event in Antalya, Türkiye. She was defeated by Ángela Fita Boluda.

In September 2025, she won the biggest title of her career in doubles at the W75 event in Bucharest, Romania, with her partner Jenny Dürst.

In November 2025, she played for Slovakia for the first time in the 2025 Billie Jean King Cup play-offs. In November, she also reached the doubles final of the W75 Trnava Indoor in Slovakia, with partner Katarína Kužmová.

In May 2026, she won the W75 event Empire Slovak Open in Trnava together with her Finnish partner Laura Hietaranta.

== ITF Circuit finals ==
=== Singles: 11 (8 titles, 3 runner-ups) ===
Legend W35 tournaments (2–2) W15 tournaments (6–1)	Finals by surface Hard (2–0) Clay (6–3)

Result	W–L	Date	Tournament	Tier	Surface	Opponent	Score
Win	1–0	Jan 2024	ITF Monastir, Tunisia	W15	Hard	Milana Zhabrailova	6–1, 6–1
Win	2–0	Mar 2024	ITF Heraklion, Greece	W15	Clay	(Slovakia) Sofia Milatová	6–3, 6–3
Win	3–0	Apr 2024	ITF Hammamet, Tunisia	W35	Clay	(Belgium) Marie Benoît	6–3, 2–6, 6–2
Win	4–0	Aug 2024	ITF Brașov, Romania	W35	Clay	(Romania) Oana Gavrilă	6–0, 7–6^{(5)}
Win	5–0	Sep 2024	ITF Trnava, Slovakia	W15	Hard (i)	(United Kingdom) Amelia Rajecki	6–1, 3–6, 6–3
Loss	5–1	Feb 2025	ITF Antalya, Turkey	W35	Clay	(Spain) Ángela Fita Boluda	3–6, 4–6
Win	6–1	Jan 2026	ITF Antalya, Turkiye	W15	Clay	(Italy) Beatrice Ricci	7–6^{(4)}, 6–1
Loss	6–2	Feb 2026	ITF Antalya, Turkiye	W15	Clay	Anastasia Zolotareva	3–6, 6–7^{(5)}
Win	7–2	May 2026	ITF Belgrade, Serbia	W15	Clay	(Romania) Briana Szabó	6–2, 6–1
Win	8–2	May 2026	ITF Casablanca, Morocco	W15	Clay	(Spain) Marta Soriano Santiago	6–0, 6–1
Loss	8–3	Jun 2026	ITF Mohammedia, Morocco	W35	Clay	Daria Egorova	6–3, 4–6, 6–7^{(5)}

=== Doubles: 21 (11 titles, 10 runner-ups) ===
Legend W75 tournaments (2–3) W35 tournaments (6–4) W15 tournaments (3–3)	Finals by surface Hard (3–4) Clay (8–6)

Result	W-L	Date	Tournament	Tier	Surface	Partner	Opponents	Score
Loss	0–1	Mar 2023	ITF Heraklion, Greece	W15	Clay	(Israel) Shavit Kimchi	(Lithuania) Patricija Paukštytė (Romania) Anca Todoni	3–6, 7–6^{(7)}, [5–10]
Win	1–1	May 2023	ITF Antalya, Turkey	W15	Clay	(Slovakia) Anika Jašková	(Turkey) Doğa Türkmen (Belgium) Amelie Van Impe	6–2, 6–1
Loss	1–2	May 2023	ITF Kuršumlijska Banja, Serbia	W15	Clay	(Belgium) Tilwith Di Girolami	(Greece) Eleni Christofi (Switzerland) Sebastianna Scilipoti	7–5, 4–6, [6–10]
Loss	1–3	Jan 2024	ITF Monastir, Tunisia	W15	Hard	(Slovakia) Radka Zelníčková	(France) Yasmine Mansouri (France) Nina Radovanovic	4–6, 2–6
Win	2–3	Jan 2024	ITF Monastir, Tunisia	W35	Hard	(Slovakia) Katarína Kužmová	(United Kingdom) Madeleine Brooks (United Kingdom) Katy Dunne	6–4, 6–3
Win	3–3	Mar 2024	ITF Heraklion, Greece	W15	Clay	(France) Lucie Nguyen Tan	(Italy) Laura Mair (Greece) Sapfo Sakellaridi	4–6, 6–4, [11–9]
Loss	3–4	May 2024	ITF Klagenfurt, Austria	W35	Clay	(Australia) Kaylah McPhee	(Czech Republic) Aneta Kučmová (Slovenia) Nika Radišić	3–6, 5–7
Win	4–4	Jun 2024	ITF Klosters, Switzerland	W35	Clay	(Switzerland) Jenny Dürst	(Germany) Katharina Hobgarski (Germany) Antonia Schmidt	6–2, 4–6, [10–8]
Win	5–4	Jul 2024	ITF Buzău, Romania	W35	Clay	(Finland) Laura Hietaranta	(Romania) Briana Szabó (Romania) Patricia Maria Țig	6–3, 6–4
Win	6–4	Aug 2024	ITF Brașov, Romania	W35	Hard	(Russia) Ksenia Laskutova	(Ukraine) Maryna Kolb (Ukraine) Nadiia Kolb	6–3, 6–4
Win	7–4	Sep 2024	ITF Trnava, Slovakia	W15	Hard	(Slovakia) Katarína Kužmová	(Czech Republic) Ivana Šebestová (Slovakia) Radka Zelníčková	7–5, 4–6, [10–6]
Loss	7–5	Oct 2024	Slovak Open Slovakia	W75	Hard (i)	(Slovakia) Katarína Kužmová	(Netherlands) Isabelle Haverlag; Elena Pridankina	5–7, 2–6
Loss	7–6	Aug 2025	ITF Bydgoszcz, Poland	W35	Hard	(Slovakia) Katarína Kužmová	(Poland) Zuzanna Pawlikowska (Greece) Sapfo Sakellaridi	2–6, 4–6
Win	8–6	Sep 2025	ITF Bucharest, Romania	W75	Clay	(Switzerland) Jenny Dürst	(Algeria) Inès Ibbou (Greece) Despina Papamichail	6–1, 6–1
Loss	8–7	Nov 2025	Trnava Indoor, Slovakia	W75	Hard (i)	(Slovakia) Katarína Kužmová	(Czech Republic) Aneta Kučmová (Slovenia) Nika Radišić	4–6, 3–6
Win	9–7	Feb 2026	ITF Antalya, Turkiye	W35	Clay	(Germany) Joëlle Steur	(Italy) Jennifer Ruggeri (Italy) Aurora Zantedeschi	1–6, 7–6^{(3)}, [10–7]
Loss	9–8	Mar 2026	ITF Heraklion, Greece	W35	Clay	(Germany) Katharina Hobgarski	(Morocco) Yasmine Kabbaj (Ukraine) Nadiia Kolb	2–6, 1–6
Loss	9–9	Mar 2026	ITF San Gregorio, Italy	W35	Clay	(Germany) Joëlle Steur	(France) Jenny Lim (France) Margaux Rouvroy	4–6, 6–2, [7–10]
Win	10–9	May 2026	Empire Slovak Open, Slovakia	W75	Clay	(Finland) Laura Hietaranta	(Spain) María Martínez Vaquero (Spain) Alba Rey García	6–2, 6–3
Win	11–9	Jun 2026	ITF Casablanca, Morocco	W35	Clay	(United States) Madison Sieg	Elina Nepliy (India) Vasanti Shinde	7–6^{(1)}, 6–1
Loss	11–10	Jul 2026	ITS Cup, Czech Republic	W75	Clay	(Finland) Laura Hietaranta	(Hungary) Adrienn Nagy (Czech Republic) Ivana Šebestová	6–3, 6–7^{(6)}, [5–10]

== Double bagel matches ==
=== Singles (5–0) ===
Result	Year	Tournament	Tier	Surface	Opponent	Rd
Win	2023	ITF Varna, Bulgaria	W25	Clay	(Bulgaria) Aleksandra Mateva	Q1
Win	2024	ITF Hammamet, Tunusia	W25	Clay	(Germany) Anastasiya Kuparev	Q2
Win	2024	ITF Ystad, Sweden	W50	Clay	(Norway) Emilie Elde	Q1
Win	2024	ITF Trnava, Slovakia	W15	Hard	(Czech Republic) Denise Hrdinková	1R
Win	2026	ITF Antalya, Türkiye	W25	Clay	Anastasiia Kostiushkina	Q2

=== Doubles (1–0) ===
Result	Year	Tournament	Tier	Surface	Partner	Opponent	Rd
Win	2026	ITF Antalya, Türkiye	W25	Clay	(Germany) Joëlle Steur	(Armenia) Ani Amiraghyan; Daria Lodikova	SF
