= 2011 Slovak Open – Men's doubles =

Men's doubles
- 2011 Slovak Open

Final
- Champions: (Czech Republic) Jan Hájek (Slovakia) Lukáš Lacko
- Runners-up: (Czech Republic) Lukáš Rosol (Czech Republic) David Škoch
- Score: 7–5, 7–5

Events
Singles	men	women
Doubles	men	women
← 2010 ·	Slovak Open	· 2012 →

Colin Fleming and Jamie Murray were the defending champions but decided not to participate.
Jan Hájek and Lukáš Lacko won the title after defeating Lukáš Rosol and David Škoch 7–5, 7–5 in the final.

== Seeds ==
1. (United States) James Cerretani / (Slovakia) Michal Mertiňák (first round)
2. (Russia) Michail Elgin / (Russia) Alexandre Kudryavtsev (quarterfinals)
3. (Germany) Philipp Marx / (Slovakia) Igor Zelenay (quarterfinals)
4. (Sweden) Johan Brunström / (United Kingdom) Ken Skupski (first round)

== Draw ==
=== Key ===
- Q = Qualifier
- WC = Wild card
- LL = Lucky loser
- Alt = Alternate
- SE = Special exempt
- PR = Protected ranking
- ITF = ITF entry
- JE = Junior exempt
- w/o = Walkover
- r = Retired
- d = Defaulted
- SR = Special ranking

=== Draw ===
First round
1	(United States) J Cerretani (Slovakia) M Mertiňák	6	2	[3]
(Lithuania) R Berankis (France) A Mannarino	1	6	[10]
WC	(Slovakia) K Čapkovič (Slovakia) F Horanský	3	6^{7}
(France) K de Schepper (France) M Teixeira	6	7^{9}
4	(Sweden) J Brunström (United Kingdom) K Skupski	6	6^{5}	[7]
(Uzbekistan) D Istomin (Italy) A Motti	4	7^{7}	[10]
(Czech Republic) L Rosol (Czech Republic) D Škoch	7	7^{7}
WC	(Slovakia) Patrik Fabian (Slovakia) Adrian Partl	5	6^{4}
(Turkey) M İlhan (Argentina) H Zeballos	4	5
(Australia) J Kerr (United States) T Parrott	6	7
(Poland) T Bednarek (Australia) M Ebden	6^{2}	6^{6}
3	(Germany) P Marx (Slovakia) I Zelenay	7^{7}	7^{8}
(Czech Republic) J Hájek (Slovakia) L Lacko	6	7^{10}
(Russia) I Andreev (Ukraine) S Stakhovsky	2	6^{8}
WC	(Slovakia) Jozef Kovalík (Slovakia) A Martin	3	5
2	(Russia) M Elgin (Russia) A Kudryavtsev	6	7

Quarterfinals
(Lithuania) R Berankis (France) A Mannarino	3	5
(France) K de Schepper (France) M Teixeira	6	7
(Uzbekistan) D Istomin (Italy) A Motti	6	5	[6]
(Czech Republic) L Rosol (Czech Republic) D Škoch	3	7	[10]
(Australia) J Kerr (United States) T Parrott	7^{7}	5	[10]
3	(Germany) P Marx (Slovakia) I Zelenay	6^{3}	7	[4]
(Czech Republic) J Hájek (Slovakia) L Lacko	6	2	[10]
2	(Russia) M Elgin (Russia) A Kudryavtsev	3	6	[5]

Semifinals
(France) K de Schepper (France) M Teixeira	3	1
(Czech Republic) L Rosol (Czech Republic) D Škoch	6	6
(Australia) J Kerr (United States) T Parrott	6	6^{10}	[9]
(Czech Republic) J Hájek (Slovakia) L Lacko	4	7^{12}	[11]

Final
(Czech Republic) L Rosol (Czech Republic) D Škoch	5	5
(Czech Republic) J Hájek (Slovakia) L Lacko	7	7
