= 2011 Slovak Open – Women's doubles =

Women's doubles
- 2011 Slovak Open

Final
- Champions: (United Kingdom) Naomi Broady (France) Kristina Mladenovic
- Runners-up: (Czech Republic) Karolína Plíšková (Czech Republic) Kristýna Plíšková
- Score: 5–7, 6–4, [10–2]

Events
Singles	men	women
Doubles	men	women
← 2010 ·	Slovak Open	· 2012 →

Emma Laine and Irena Pavlovic were the defending champions, but both decided not to participate.

Naomi Broady and Kristina Mladenovic won the title defeating Karolína Plíšková and Kristýna Plíšková in the final 5–7, 6–4, [10–2].

== Seeds ==
1. (Czech Republic) Karolína Plíšková / (Czech Republic) Kristýna Plíšková (final)
2. (Ukraine) Lyudmyla Kichenok / (Ukraine) Nadiia Kichenok (semifinals)
3. (Hungary) Tímea Babos / (Hungary) Réka-Luca Jani (first round)
4. (United Kingdom) Naomi Broady / (France) Kristina Mladenovic (champions)

== Draw ==
=== Key ===
- Q = Qualifier
- WC = Wild card
- LL = Lucky loser
- Alt = Alternate
- SE = Special exempt
- PR = Protected ranking
- ITF = ITF entry
- JE = Junior exempt
- w/o = Walkover
- r = Retired
- d = Defaulted
- SR = Special ranking

First round
1	(Czech Republic) Ka Plíšková (Czech Republic) Kr Plíšková	6	6
Alt	(Slovakia) K Kachlíková (Slovakia) L Tvarošková	0	3
(Slovenia) A Prislan (Bosnia and Herzegovina) J Tinjić	3	0
(Slovakia) J Čepelová (Slovakia) J Husárová	6	6
3	(Hungary) T Babos (Hungary) R-L Jani	2	5
(Slovakia) M Hončová (Slovakia) Z Luknárová	6	7
WC	(Slovakia) L Butkovská (Slovakia) AK Schmiedlová	6	6
WC	(Slovakia) L Juríková (Slovakia) K Kučová	4	4
(Czech Republic) H Birnerová (Romania) Á Szatmári	6	6
WC	(Slovakia) K Morgošová (Slovakia) P Petrisková	4	4
(Israel) J Glushko (France) A Lim	4	6	[3]
4	(United Kingdom) N Broady (France) K Mladenovic	6	4	[10]
(Czech Republic) Iveta Gerlová (Czech Republic) Lucie Kriegsmannová	6	6
(Poland) P Kania (Poland) K Kawa	4	3
(Bulgaria) E Kostova (Poland) B Sobaszkiewicz	2	0
2	(Ukraine) L Kichenok (Ukraine) N Kichenok	6	6

Quarterfinals
1	(Czech Republic) Ka Plíšková (Czech Republic) Kr Plíšková	7^{7}	6
(Slovakia) J Čepelová (Slovakia) J Husárová	6^{5}	3
(Slovakia) M Hončová (Slovakia) Z Luknárová	6	6
WC	(Slovakia) L Butkovská (Slovakia) AK Schmiedlová	3	3
(Czech Republic) H Birnerová (Romania) Á Szatmári	1	6	[4]
4	(United Kingdom) N Broady (France) K Mladenovic	6	3	[10]
(Czech Republic) I Gerlová (Czech Republic) L Kriegsmannová	1	7^{7}	[8]
2	(Ukraine) L Kichenok (Ukraine) N Kichenok	6	6^{2}	[10]

Semifinals
1	(Czech Republic) Ka Plíšková (Czech Republic) Kr Plíšková	6	6
(Slovakia) M Hončová (Slovakia) Z Luknárová	2	3
4	(United Kingdom) N Broady (France) K Mladenovic	4	6	[12]
2	(Ukraine) L Kichenok (Ukraine) N Kichenok	6	3	[10]

Finals
1	(Czech Republic) Ka Plíšková (Czech Republic) Kr Plíšková	7	4	[2]
4	(United Kingdom) N Broady (France) K Mladenovic	5	6	[10]
