= 2011 Slovak Open – Women's singles =

Women's singles
- 2011 Slovak Open

Final
- Champion: (Ukraine) Lesia Tsurenko
- Runner-up: (Czech Republic) Karolína Plíšková
- Score: 7–5, 6–3

Events
Singles	men	women
Doubles	men	women
← 2010 ·	Slovak Open	· 2012 →

Kateryna Bondarenko was the defending champion, but chose not to participate.

Lesia Tsurenko won the title, defeating Karolína Plíšková in the final, 7–5, 6–3.

== Seeds ==
1. (Ukraine) Lesia Tsurenko (champion)
2. (Bulgaria) Elitsa Kostova (first round)
3. (Hungary) Tímea Babos (semifinals)
4. (Czech Republic) Sandra Záhlavová (second round)
5. (Czech Republic) Karolína Plíšková (final)
6. (Hungary) Réka-Luca Jani (first round)
7. (Israel) Julia Glushko (quarterfinals)
8. (Czech Republic) Kristýna Plíšková (second round)

== Draw ==
=== Key ===
- Q = Qualifier
- WC = Wild card
- LL = Lucky loser
- Alt = Alternate
- SE = Special exempt
- PR = Protected ranking
- ITF = ITF entry
- JE = Junior exempt
- w/o = Walkover
- r = Retired
- d = Defaulted
- SR = Special ranking

=== Finals ===
Semifinals
1	(Ukraine) Lesia Tsurenko	6	7^{7}
(Slovakia) Lenka Juríková	2	6^{3}
3	(Hungary) Tímea Babos	4	6	6^{5}
5	(Czech Republic) Karolína Plíšková	6	4	7^{7}

Final
1	(Ukraine) Lesia Tsurenko	7	6
5	(Czech Republic) Karolína Plíšková	5	3

=== Top half ===
First round
1	(Ukraine) L Tsurenko	7	6
SE	(Croatia) A Vrljić	5	3
(France) K Mladenovic	6	7
(Slovenia) M Zec Peškirič	3	5
(Slovakia) J Čepelová	6	6
Q	(Austria) N Rottmann	3	0
Q	(Slovakia) Z Luknárová	4	4
7	(Israel) J Glushko	6	6
4	(Czech Republic) S Záhlavová	6	4	6
(Lithuania) L Stančiūtė	4	6	2
(Slovenia) N Kolar	4	2
(Slovakia) L Juríková	6	6
WC	(Slovakia) L Butkovská	4	4
Q	(Netherlands) R Hogenkamp	6	6
Q	(Ukraine) N Kichenok	3	3
8	(Czech Republic) Kr Plíšková	6	6

Second round
1	(Ukraine) L Tsurenko	6	6
(France) K Mladenovic	4	3
(Slovakia) J Čepelová	0	6^{4}
7	(Israel) J Glushko	6	7^{7}
4	(Czech Republic) S Záhlavová	1	0
(Slovakia) L Juríková	6	6
Q	(Netherlands) R Hogenkamp	6	6
8	(Czech Republic) Kr Plíšková	4	4

Quarterfinals
1	(Ukraine) L Tsurenko	6	6
7	(Israel) J Glushko	1	0
(Slovakia) L Juríková	7	4	6
Q	(Netherlands) R Hogenkamp	5	6	4

Semifinals
1	(Ukraine) L Tsurenko	6	7^{7}
(Slovakia) L Juríková	2	6^{3}

=== Bottom half ===
First round
6	(Hungary) R-L Jani	2	3
Q	(Russia) D Gavrilova	6	6
(France) A Lim	4	4
(Slovakia) K Kučová	6	6
(United Kingdom) N Broady	5	6	6
(Luxembourg) A Kremer	7	2	3
Q	(Italy) A Văideanu	2	1
3	(Hungary) T Babos	6	6
5	(Czech Republic) Ka Plíšková	6	6
WC	(Czech Republic) B Krejčíková	1	3
WC	(Slovakia) P Petrisková	0	2
SE	(Poland) P Kania	6	6
Q	(Ukraine) L Kichenok	6	6
Q	(Slovakia) M Hončová	0	2
WC	(Slovakia) AK Schmiedlová	6	6^{3}	6
2	(Bulgaria) E Kostova	1	7^{7}	3

Second round
Q	(Russia) D Gavrilova	6	7
(Slovakia) K Kučová	3	5
(United Kingdom) N Broady	7	6^{4}	6^{7}
3	(Hungary) T Babos	5	7^{7}	7^{9}
5	(Czech Republic) Ka Plíšková	6	6
SE	(Poland) P Kania	2	2
Q	(Ukraine) L Kichenok	6	6
WC	(Slovakia) AK Schmiedlová	3	3

Quarterfinals
Q	(Russia) D Gavrilova	2	2
3	(Hungary) T Babos	6	6
5	(Czech Republic) Ka Plíšková	6	6
Q	(Ukraine) L Kichenok	2	2

Semifinals
3	(Hungary) T Babos	4	6	6^{5}
5	(Czech Republic) Ka Plíšková	6	4	7^{7}
