= 2011 Slovak Open – Men's singles =

Men's singles
- 2011 Slovak Open

Final
- Champion: (Slovakia) Lukáš Lacko
- Runner-up: (Lithuania) Ričardas Berankis
- Score: 7–6^{(9–7)}, 6–2

Events
Singles	men	women
Doubles	men	women
← 2010 ·	Slovak Open	· 2012 →

Martin Kližan was the defending champion but decided not to participate.

Lukáš Lacko won the title defeating Ričardas Berankis in the final 7–6^{(9–7)}, 6–2.

== Seeds ==
1. (Poland) Łukasz Kubot (first round)
2. (Ukraine) Sergiy Stakhovsky (quarterfinals)
3. (Uzbekistan) Denis Istomin (first round)
4. (Czech Republic) Lukáš Rosol (semifinals)
5. (Australia) Matthew Ebden (second round)
6. (France) Adrian Mannarino (quarterfinals)
7. (Germany) Michael Berrer (quarterfinals)
8. (France) Stéphane Robert (second round)

== Draw ==
=== Key ===
- Q = Qualifier
- WC = Wild card
- LL = Lucky loser
- Alt = Alternate
- SE = Special exempt
- PR = Protected ranking
- ITF = ITF entry
- JE = Junior exempt
- w/o = Walkover
- r = Retired
- d = Defaulted
- SR = Special ranking

=== Finals ===
Semifinals
(Slovakia) Lukáš Lacko	4	7	6
(Canada) Frank Dancevic	6	5	0
4	(Czech Republic) Lukáš Rosol	6	0	6^{2}
(Lithuania) Ričardas Berankis	3	6	7^{7}

Final
(Slovakia) Lukáš Lacko	7^{9}	6
(Lithuania) Ričardas Berankis	6^{7}	2

=== Top half ===
First round
1	(Poland) Ł Kubot	1	1
(Slovakia) L Lacko	6	6
(France) K de Schepper	3	2
(Czech Republic) J Hájek	6	6
Q	(Croatia) A Pavić	6	6
SE	(Germany) P Torebko	3	3
(Russia) I Andreev	4	7^{7}	2
7	(Germany) M Berrer	6	6^{5}	6
3	(Uzbekistan) D Istomin	6^{3}	6	3
(Tunisia) M Jaziri	7^{7}	4	6
Q	(Czech Republic) J Minář	6	6
WC	(Slovakia) A Martin	4	4
(Canada) F Dancevic	6	6
WC	(Czech Republic) J Veselý	4	0
(Poland) M Przysiężny	1	6^{6}
5	(Australia) M Ebden	6	7^{8}

Second round
(Slovakia) L Lacko	7^{7}	6
(Czech Republic) J Hájek	6^{4}	2
Q	(Croatia) A Pavić	6	4	2
7	(Germany) M Berrer	4	6	6
(Tunisia) M Jaziri	3	4
Q	(Czech Republic) J Minář	6	6
(Canada) F Dancevic	6^{4}	7^{7}	6
5	(Australia) M Ebden	7^{7}	6^{5}	4

Quarterfinals
(Slovakia) L Lacko	6^{5}	7^{7}	6
7	(Germany) M Berrer	7^{7}	6^{5}	4
Q	(Czech Republic) J Minář	5	2
(Canada) F Dancevic	7	6

Semifinals
(Slovakia) L Lacko	4	7	6
(Canada) F Dancevic	6	5	0

=== Bottom half ===
First round
6	(France) A Mannarino	6	6
SE	(Czech Republic) J Hernych	1	2
WC	(Slovakia) J Kovalík	7^{7}	5	3
(Argentina) H Zeballos	6^{4}	7	6
(Russia) A Kudryavtsev	3	6	1
(Estonia) J Zopp	6	3	6
(Turkey) M İlhan	2	6^{3}
4	(Czech Republic) L Rosol	6	7^{7}
8	(France) S Robert	6	7^{7}
WC	(Slovakia) F Horanský	2	6^{5}
(Romania) A Ungur	6^{5}	3
(Lithuania) R Berankis	7^{7}	6
Q	(Serbia) B Pašanski	1	1
(France) M Teixeira	6	6
Q	(Slovakia) K Čapkovič	6^{4}	5
2	(Ukraine) S Stakhovsky	7^{7}	7

Second round
6	(France) A Mannarino	7	6
(Argentina) H Zeballos	5	0
(Estonia) J Zopp	3	6^{4}
4	(Czech Republic) L Rosol	6	7^{7}
8	(France) S Robert	6	4	6^{4}
(Lithuania) R Berankis	2	6	7^{7}
(France) M Teixeira	1	3
2	(Ukraine) S Stakhovsky	6	6

Quarterfinals
6	(France) A Mannarino	3	6^{4}
4	(Czech Republic) L Rosol	6	7^{7}
(Lithuania) R Berankis	6^{6}	6	6
2	(Ukraine) S Stakhovsky	7^{8}	3	2

Semifinals
4	(Czech Republic) L Rosol	6	0	6^{2}
(Lithuania) R Berankis	3	6	7^{7}
