= 2011 Slovak Open =

- Date: 14–20 November
- Edition: 12th (men); 6th (women)
- Surface: Hard (indoor)
- Location: Bratislava, Slovakia

Champions

Men's singles
- (Slovakia) Lukáš Lacko

Women's singles
- (Ukraine) Lesia Tsurenko

Men's doubles
- (Czech Republic) Jan Hájek / (Slovakia) Lukáš Lacko

Women's doubles
- (United Kingdom) Naomi Broady / (France) Kristina Mladenovic
| ← 2010 · | Slovak Open | · 2012 → |

The 2011 Slovak Open was a professional tennis tournament played on indoor hard courts. It was the twelfth and sixth edition of the tournament which was part of the Tretorn SERIE+ of the 2011 ATP Challenger Tour and the 2011 ITF Women's Circuit. It took place in Bratislava, Slovakia between 14 and 20 November 2011.

== ATP entrants ==
=== Seeds ===
| Country | Player | Rank^{1} | Seed |
|---|---|---|---|
| POL | Łukasz Kubot | 60 | 1 |
| UKR | Sergiy Stakhovsky | 63 | 2 |
| UZB | Denis Istomin | 73 | 3 |
| CZE | Lukáš Rosol | 78 | 4 |
| AUS | Matthew Ebden | 82 | 5 |
| FRA | Adrian Mannarino | 85 | 6 |
| GER | Michael Berrer | 104 | 7 |
| FRA | Stéphane Robert | 105 | 8 |

- ^{1} Rankings are as of 7 November 2011.

=== Other entrants ===
The following players received wildcards into the singles main draw:

- (Slovakia) Filip Horanský
- (Slovakia) Jozef Kovalík
- (Slovakia) Andrej Martin
- (Czech Republic) Jiří Veselý

The following players received entry as a special exempt into the singles main draw:

- (Czech Republic) Jan Hernych
- (Germany) Peter Torebko

The following players received entry from the qualifying draw:

- (Slovakia) Kamil Čapkovič
- (Czech Republic) Jan Minář
- (Serbia) Boris Pašanski
- (Croatia) Ante Pavić

== WTA entrants ==
=== Seeds ===
| Country | Player | Rank^{1} | Seed |
|---|---|---|---|
| UKR | Lesia Tsurenko | 120 | 1 |
| BUL | Elitsa Kostova | 148 | 2 |
| HUN | Tímea Babos | 153 | 3 |
| CZE | Sandra Záhlavová | 154 | 4 |
| CZE | Karolína Plíšková | 159 | 5 |
| HUN | Réka-Luca Jani | 162 | 6 |
| ISR | Julia Glushko | 165 | 7 |
| CZE | Kristýna Plíšková | 179 | 8 |

- ^{1} Rankings are as of 7 November 2011.

=== Other entrants ===
The following players received wildcards into the singles main draw:

- (Slovakia) Lucia Butkovská
- (Czech Republic) Barbora Krejčíková
- (Slovakia) Paulína Petrisková
- (Slovakia) Anna Karolína Schmiedlová

The following players received entry from the qualifying draw:

- (Russia) Daria Gavrilova
- (Netherlands) Richèl Hogenkamp
- (Slovakia) Michaela Hončová
- (Ukraine) Lyudmyla Kichenok
- (Ukraine) Nadiia Kichenok
- (Slovakia) Zuzana Luknárová
- (Austria) Nicole Rottmann
- (Italy) Andreea Văideanu

The following players received entry from a Special Exempt spot:

- (Poland) Paula Kania
- (Croatia) Ana Vrljić

== Champions ==
=== Men's singles ===
(Slovakia) Lukáš Lacko def. (Lithuania) Ričardas Berankis, 7–6^{(9–7)}, 6–2

=== Women's singles ===
(Ukraine) Lesia Tsurenko def. (Czech Republic) Karolína Plíšková, 7–5, 6–3

=== Men's doubles ===
(Czech Republic) Jan Hájek / (Slovakia) Lukáš Lacko def. (Czech Republic) Lukáš Rosol / (Czech Republic) David Škoch, 7–5, 7–5

=== Women's doubles ===
(United Kingdom) Naomi Broady / (France) Kristina Mladenovic def. (Czech Republic) Karolína Plíšková / (Czech Republic) Kristýna Plíšková, 5–7, 6–4, [10–2]
