= 2012 Slovak Open – Singles =

Singles
- 2012 Slovak Open

Final
- Champion: (Czech Republic) Lukáš Rosol
- Runner-up: (Germany) Björn Phau
- Score: 6–7^{(3–7)}, 7–6^{(7–5)}, 7–6^{(8–6)}

Events
Singles	Doubles
- Slovak Open

Lukáš Lacko was the defending champion but defeated in the Semifinals by Lukáš Rosol.
Rosol went on to win the title against Björn Phau 6–7^{(3–7)}, 7–6^{(7–5)}, 7–6^{(8–6)} in the final.

== Seeds ==
1. (Slovakia) Lukáš Lacko (semifinals)
2. (Croatia) Ivan Dodig (semifinals)
3. (Germany) Björn Phau (final)
4. (Czech Republic) Lukáš Rosol (champion)
5. (Ukraine) Sergiy Stakhovsky (first round)
6. (Lithuania) Ričardas Berankis (first round)
7. (Belgium) Olivier Rochus (quarterfinals)
8. (Croatia) Ivo Karlović (quarterfinals)

== Draw ==
Key

- Q = Qualifier
- WC = Wild card
- LL = Lucky loser
- Alt = Alternate
- ITF = ITF entry
- PR = Protected ranking
- SR = Special ranking
- SE = Special exempt
- JE = Junior exempt
- JR = Junior Accelerator Programme entrant
- CO = College Accelerator Programme entrant
- NG = Next Gen Accelerator Program entrant
- w/o = Walkover
- r = Retired
- d = Defaulted

=== Finals ===
Semifinals
1	(Slovakia) Lukáš Lacko	3	6^{4}
4	(Czech Republic) Lukáš Rosol	6	7^{7}
3	(Germany) Björn Phau	7^{8}	4	6
2	(Croatia) Ivan Dodig	6^{6}	6	3

Final
4	(Czech Republic) Lukáš Rosol	6^{3}	7^{7}	7^{8}
3	(Germany) Björn Phau	7^{7}	6^{5}	6^{6}

=== Top half ===
First round
1	(Slovakia) L Lacko	6	6
(Germany) M Bachinger	2	2
(Argentina) F Delbonis	5	3
WC	(Slovakia) K Čapkovič	7	6
(Czech Republic) J Hájek	6	6
WC	(Slovakia) F Horanský	3	2
Alt	(Slovakia) A Martin	4	6	6^{5}
7	(Belgium) O Rochus	6	3	7^{7}
4	(Czech Republic) L Rosol	7^{7}	7^{7}
(France) K de Schepper	6^{5}	6^{4}
(Brazil) T Alves	2	6	6
Q	(Germany) A Begemann	6	2	3
(Canada) F Dancevic	6^{4}	4
(Ukraine) I Sergeyev	7^{7}	6
LL	(Slovakia) I Klec	6	6
5	(Ukraine) S Stakhovsky	4	4

Second round
1	(Slovakia) L Lacko	6	6^{5}	6
WC	(Slovakia) K Čapkovič	4	7^{7}	3
(Czech Republic) J Hájek	6	2	3
7	(Belgium) O Rochus	2	6	6
4	(Czech Republic) L Rosol	7^{7}	7
(Brazil) T Alves	6^{2}	5
(Ukraine) I Sergeyev	7^{7}	6^{5}	3
LL	(Slovakia) I Klec	6^{5}	7^{7}	6

Quarterfinals
1	(Slovakia) L Lacko	2	6	6
7	(Belgium) O Rochus	6	3	2
4	(Czech Republic) L Rosol	6	6
LL	(Slovakia) I Klec	3	4

Semifinals
1	(Slovakia) L Lacko	3	6^{4}
4	(Czech Republic) L Rosol	6	7^{7}

=== Bottom half ===
First round
6	(Lithuania) R Berankis	3	6	4
(Romania) M Copil	6	3	6
Q	(Slovakia) M Mečíř	7	4	6^{3}
(Belarus) U Ignatik	5	6	7^{7}
WC	(Slovakia) N Gomboš	6	3	6
(Russia) I Kunitsyn	1	6	1
(Switzerland) M Chiudinelli	4	4
3	(Germany) B Phau	6	6
8	(Croatia) I Karlović	7^{7}	6
(Germany) M Berrer	6^{4}	4
(Serbia) D Lajović	6	7^{8}
(Ukraine) I Marchenko	4	6^{6}
Q	(Slovakia) M Mertiňák	6	6^{6}	6
WC	(Slovakia) J Kovalík	4	7^{8}	4
Q	(Italy) R Bellotti	1	1
2	(Croatia) I Dodig	6	6

Second round
(Romania) M Copil	6	7^{7}
(Belarus) U Ignatik	3	6^{4}
WC	(Slovakia) N Gomboš	6	3	2
3	(Germany) B Phau	4	6	6
8	(Croatia) I Karlović	7^{7}	6
(Serbia) D Lajović	6^{3}	2
Q	(Slovakia) M Mertiňák	4	3
2	(Croatia) I Dodig	6	6

Quarterfinals
(Romania) M Copil	5	6	3
3	(Germany) B Phau	7	1	6
8	(Croatia) I Karlović	5	6^{3}
2	(Croatia) I Dodig	7	7^{7}

Semifinals
3	(Germany) B Phau	7^{8}	4	6
2	(Croatia) I Dodig	6^{6}	6	3
