= 2012 Slovak Open – Doubles =

Doubles
- 2012 Slovak Open

Final
- Champion: (Czech Republic) Lukáš Dlouhý (Russia) Michail Elgin
- Runner-up: (Germany) Philipp Marx (Romania) Florin Mergea
- Score: 6–7^{(5–7)}, 6–2, [10–6]

Events
Singles	Doubles
- Slovak Open

Jan Hájek and Lukáš Lacko were the defending champions but lost in the semifinals to Philipp Marx and Florin Mergea.
Lukáš Dlouhý and Michail Elgin defeated Marx and Mergea 6–7^{(5–7)}, 6–2, [10–6] in the final.

== Seeds ==
1. (Czech Republic) František Čermák / (Slovakia) Michal Mertiňák (semifinals)
2. (Germany) Andre Begemann / (Germany) Martin Emmrich (quarterfinals)
3. (Czech Republic) Lukáš Dlouhý / (Russia) Michail Elgin (champions)
4. (Croatia) Ivan Dodig / (Croatia) Mate Pavić (first round)

== Draw ==
Key

- Q = Qualifier
- WC = Wild card
- LL = Lucky loser
- Alt = Alternate
- ITF = ITF entry
- PR = Protected ranking
- SR = Special ranking
- SE = Special exempt
- JE = Junior exempt
- JR = Junior Accelerator Programme entrant
- CO = College Accelerator Programme entrant
- NG = Next Gen Accelerator Program entrant
- w/o = Walkover
- r = Retired
- d = Defaulted

=== Draw ===
First round
1	(Czech Republic) F Čermák (Slovakia) M Mertiňák	6	6
WC	(Slovakia) F Horanský (Slovakia) Jozef Kovalik	1	4
(Brazil) T Alves (Slovakia) K Čapkovič	7^{9}	6
WC	(Slovakia) Patrik Fabian (Slovakia) Matej Maruscak	6^{7}	4
3	(Czech Republic) L Dlouhý (Russia) M Elgin	7^{7}	6
(Belarus) U Ignatik (Ukraine) D Molchanov	6^{1}	3
(Croatia) I Karlović (Germany) F Moser	6	7^{7}
(Australia) J Kerr (Sweden) A Siljeström	4	6^{5}
(Ukraine) I Marchenko (Ukraine) I Sergeyev	1	3
(Czech Republic) J Hájek (Slovakia) L Lacko	6	6
(Poland) T Bednarek (Poland) M Kowalczyk	7^{7}	4	[10]
4	(Croatia) I Dodig (Croatia) M Pavić	6^{5}	6	[7]
(Germany) P Marx (Romania) F Mergea	6	7^{7}
WC	(Slovakia) Norbert Gombos (Slovakia) A Martin	0	6^{5}
(Czech Republic) L Rosol (Slovakia) I Zelenay	6	3	[10]
2	(Germany) A Begemann (Germany) M Emmrich	4	6	[12]

Quarterfinals
1	(Czech Republic) F Čermák (Slovakia) M Mertiňák	6	6
(Brazil) T Alves (Slovakia) K Čapkovič	3	4
3	(Czech Republic) L Dlouhý (Russia) M Elgin	7^{7}	7
(Croatia) I Karlović (Germany) F Moser	6^{3}	5
(Czech Republic) J Hájek (Slovakia) L Lacko	6	6^{3}	[10]
(Poland) T Bednarek (Poland) M Kowalczyk	4	7^{7}	[2]
(Germany) P Marx (Romania) F Mergea	6	7^{8}
2	(Germany) A Begemann (Germany) M Emmrich	3	6^{6}

Semifinals
1	(Czech Republic) F Čermák (Slovakia) M Mertiňák	7^{7}	3	[5]
3	(Czech Republic) L Dlouhý (Russia) M Elgin	6^{3}	6	[10]
(Czech Republic) J Hájek (Slovakia) L Lacko	3	2
(Germany) P Marx (Romania) F Mergea	6	6

Final
3	(Czech Republic) L Dlouhý (Russia) M Elgin	6^{5}	6	[10]
(Germany) P Marx (Romania) F Mergea	7^{7}	2	[6]
