= 2012 Slovak Open =

- Date: 5–11 November
- Edition: 13th
- Surface: Hard (indoor)
- Location: Bratislava, Slovakia

Champions

Singles
- (Czech Republic) Lukáš Rosol

Doubles
- (Czech Republic) Lukáš Dlouhý / (Russia) Mikhail Elgin
← 2011 ·	Slovak Open	· 2013 →

The 2012 Slovak Open was a professional tennis tournament played on indoor hard courts. It was the 13th edition of the tournament which was part of the 2012 ATP Challenger Tour. It took place in Bratislava, Slovakia between 5 and 11 November 2012.

== Singles main-draw entrants ==
=== Seeds ===
Country	Player	Rank^{1}	Seed
SVK	Lukáš Lacko	53	1
CRO	Ivan Dodig	67	2
GER	Björn Phau	83	3
CZE	Lukáš Rosol	85	4
UKR	Sergiy Stakhovsky	89	5
LTU	Ričardas Berankis	96	6
BEL	Olivier Rochus	97	7
CRO	Ivo Karlović	103	8

- ^{1} Rankings are as of October 29, 2012.

=== Other entrants ===
The following players received wildcards into the singles main draw:

- (Slovakia) Norbert Gomboš
- (Slovakia) Filip Horanský
- (Slovakia) Jozef Kovalík
- (Slovakia) Kamil Čapkovič

The following players received entry as an alternate into the singles main draw:

- (Slovakia) Andrej Martin

The following players received entry from the qualifying draw:

- (Germany) Andre Begemann
- (Italy) Riccardo Bellotti
- (Slovakia) Miloslav Mečíř Jr.
- (Slovakia) Michal Mertiňák

== Champions ==
=== Singles ===
- (Czech Republic) Lukáš Rosol swd. (Germany) Björn Phau, 6–7^{(3–7)}, 7–6^{(7–5)}, 7–5^{(8–6)}

=== Doubles ===
- (Czech Republic) Lukáš Dlouhý / (Russia) Mikhail Elgin def. (Germany) Philipp Marx / (Romania) Florin Mergea, 6–7^{(5–7)}, 6–2, [10–6]
