= 2024 French Open – Men's singles qualifying =

Men's singles qualifying
- 2024 French Open

Details
- Draw: 128
- Seeds: 32

Events
| Singles | men | women | | boys | girls |
| Doubles | men | women | mixed | boys | girls |
| WC Singles | men | women | quad | boys | girls |
| WC Doubles | men | women | quad | boys | girls |

Qualification
| Singles | men | women |
- French Open

The 2024 French Open – Men's singles qualifying are a series of tennis matches that will take place from 20 to 24 May 2024 to determine the qualifiers for the 2024 French Open – Men's singles, and, if necessary, the lucky losers.

This marked the final French Open appearance for 2020 US Open champion, three-time major finalist and former world No. 3 Dominic Thiem. He lost to Otto Virtanen in the second round. This was the first and only time Thiem contested the qualifying competition of a major since the 2014 Australian Open.

Only 16 out of the 128 qualifiers who compete in this knock-out tournament, secure a main draw place.

== Seeds ==
All seeds per ATP rankings as of 6 May 2024.

1. (Chile) Cristian Garín (first round)
2. (United States) J. J. Wolf (qualifying competition, lucky loser)
3. (Australia) James Duckworth (first round)
4. (Spain) Albert Ramos Viñolas (first round)
5. (China) Shang Juncheng (first round)
6. (Brazil) Thiago Monteiro (qualified)
7. (Argentina) Camilo Ugo Carabelli (first round)
8. (Belgium) Zizou Bergs (qualified)
9. (Peru) Juan Pablo Varillas (first round)
10. (France) Grégoire Barrère (qualified)
11. (Austria) Dominic Thiem (second round)
12. (Slovakia) Lukáš Klein (first round)
13. (Argentina) Facundo Bagnis (qualifying competition, retired)
14. (Monaco) Valentin Vacherot (qualified)
15. (Serbia) Hamad Medjedovic (qualified)
16. (United States) Zachary Svajda (second round)
17. (United States) Emilio Nava (first round)
18. (Italy) Stefano Napolitano (second round)
19. (Czech Republic) Vít Kopřiva (second round)
20. (South Africa) Lloyd Harris (second round)
21. (Croatia) Duje Ajduković (second round)
22. (Bosnia and Herzegovina) Damir Džumhur (first round)
23. (Brazil) Felipe Meligeni Alves (qualified)
24. (Austria) Jurij Rodionov (first round)
25. (Kazakhstan) Mikhail Kukushkin (qualified)
26. (Moldova) Radu Albot (second round)
27. (Spain) Pablo Llamas Ruiz (first round)
28. (Italy) Matteo Gigante (qualifying competition)
29. (Argentina) Diego Schwartzman (second round)
30. (France) Benoît Paire (first round)
31. (Italy) Giulio Zeppieri (qualified)
32. (France) Titouan Droguet (second round)

== Qualifiers ==
1. (Austria) Filip Misolic
2. (Netherlands) Jesper de Jong
3. (Italy) Mattia Bellucci
4. (Germany) Henri Squire
5. (Argentina) Román Andrés Burruchaga
6. (Brazil) Thiago Monteiro
7. (Kazakhstan) Mikhail Kukushkin
8. (Belgium) Zizou Bergs
9. (Canada) Gabriel Diallo
10. (France) Grégoire Barrère
11. (Italy) Giulio Zeppieri
12. (Brazil) Gustavo Heide
13. (Japan) Shintaro Mochizuki
14. (Monaco) Valentin Vacherot
15. (Serbia) Hamad Medjedovic
16. (Brazil) Felipe Meligeni Alves

== Lucky losers ==
1. (United States) J. J. Wolf
2. (Slovakia) Jozef Kovalík
3. (Finland) Otto Virtanen

== Draw ==
Key

- Q = Qualifier
- WC = Wild card
- LL = Lucky loser
- Alt = Alternate
- ITF = ITF entry
- PR = Protected ranking
- SR = Special ranking
- SE = Special exempt
- JE = Junior exempt
- JR = Junior Accelerator Programme entrant
- CO = College Accelerator Programme entrant
- NG = Next Gen Accelerator Program entrant
- w/o = Walkover
- r = Retired
- d = Defaulted

=== First qualifier ===
First round
1 | (Chile) Cristian Garín | 4 | 6 | 1
(France) Ugo Blanchet | 6 | 4 | 6
(Austria) Filip Misolic | 6 | 6
(Japan) Sho Shimabukuro | 3 | 2
(Canada) Alexis Galarneau | 5 | 3
(France) Quentin Halys | 7 | 6
(Austria) Lukas Neumayer | 2 | 3
29 | (Argentina) Diego Schwartzman | 6 | 6

Second round
(France) Ugo Blanchet | 4 | 2
(Austria) Filip Misolic | 6 | 6
(France) Quentin Halys | 4 | 6 | 7^{10}
29 | (Argentina) Diego Schwartzman | 6 | 4 | 6^{7}

Qualifying competition
(Austria) Filip Misolic | 2 | 6 | 6
(France) Quentin Halys | 6 | 4 | 3

=== Second qualifier ===
First round
2 | (United States) J. J. Wolf | 6 | 6^{5} | 6
(United Kingdom) Ryan Peniston | 1 | 7^{7} | 2
(Hong Kong) Coleman Wong | 5 | 2
(United States) Patrick Kypson | 7 | 6
(Spain) Oriol Roca Batalla | 4 | 2
(Austria) Dennis Novak | 6 | 6
(Netherlands) Jesper de Jong | 7 | 7^{8}
27 | (Spain) Pablo Llamas Ruiz | 5 | 6^{6}

Second round
2 | (United States) J. J. Wolf | 6 | 6
(United States) Patrick Kypson | 3 | 3
(Austria) Dennis Novak | 3 | 3
(Netherlands) Jesper de Jong | 6 | 6

Qualifying competition
2 | (United States) J. J. Wolf | 1 | 2
(Netherlands) Jesper de Jong | 6 | 6

=== Third qualifier ===
First round
3 | (Australia) James Duckworth | 3 | 1
(France) Maxime Janvier | 6 | 6
(Australia) Marc Polmans | 1 | 2
(Spain) Alejandro Moro Cañas | 6 | 6
(France) Matteo Martineau | 6 | 1 | 1
(Italy) Mattia Bellucci | 3 | 6 | 6
WC | (France) Arthur Géa | 6 | 1 | 5
20 | (South Africa) Lloyd Harris | 2 | 6 | 7

Second round
(France) Maxime Janvier | 3 | 4
(Spain) Alejandro Moro Cañas | 6 | 6
(Italy) Mattia Bellucci | 6 | 7^{11}
20 | (South Africa) Lloyd Harris | 1 | 6^{9}

Qualifying competition
(Spain) Alejandro Moro Cañas | 6 | 2 | 6^{7}
(Italy) Mattia Bellucci | 3 | 6 | 7^{10}

=== Fourth qualifier ===
First round
4 | (Spain) Albert Ramos Viñolas | 3 | 6 | 3
(Italy) Andrea Vavassori | 6 | 4 | 6
(Germany) Benjamin Hassan | 4 | 6 | 6
(Germany) Rudolf Molleker | 6 | 3 | 4
(France) Hugo Grenier | 6 | 3 | 7^{10}
(United States) Tristan Boyer | 4 | 6 | 6^{3}
(Germany) Henri Squire | 2 | 6 | 6
22 | (Bosnia and Herzegovina) Damir Džumhur | 6 | 3 | 4

Second round
(Italy) Andrea Vavassori | 6^{5} | 7^{7} | 6
(Germany) Benjamin Hassan | 7^{7} | 6^{2} | 0
(France) Hugo Grenier | 2 | 4
(Germany) Henri Squire | 6 | 6

Qualifying competition
(Italy) Andrea Vavassori | 3 | 6 | 4
(Germany) Henri Squire | 6 | 3 | 6

=== Fifth qualifier ===
First round
5 | (China) Shang Juncheng | 4 | 6^{5}
(Argentina) Román Andrés Burruchaga | 6 | 7^{7}
(Japan) Yasutaka Uchiyama | 6 | 2 | 7
WC | (France) Mathys Erhard | 4 | 6 | 5
(Bolivia) Hugo Dellien | 6 | 4 | 2
(France) Benjamin Bonzi | 3 | 6 | 6
(Slovakia) Jozef Kovalík | 6 | 6
30 | (France) Benoît Paire | 1 | 4

Second round
(Argentina) Román Andrés Burruchaga | 6 | 6
(Japan) Yasutaka Uchiyama | 2 | 4
(France) Benjamin Bonzi | 3 | 2
(Slovakia) Jozef Kovalík | 6 | 6

Qualifying competition
(Argentina) Román Andrés Burruchaga | 4 | 7^{7} | 6
(Slovakia) Jozef Kovalík | 6 | 6^{2} | 4

=== Sixth qualifier ===
First round
6 | (Brazil) Thiago Monteiro | 6 | 6
(Bolivia) Murkel Dellien | 4 | 1
(Kazakhstan) Dmitry Popko | 6^{2} | 5
(France) Valentin Royer | 7^{7} | 7
(France) Kyrian Jacquet | 7^{7} | 5 | 5
(Tunisia) Aziz Dougaz | 6^{4} | 7 | 7
(Spain) Daniel Rincón | 2 | 7 | 6
24 | (Austria) Jurij Rodionov | 6 | 5 | 2

Second round
6 | (Brazil) Thiago Monteiro | 3 | 6 | 6
(France) Valentin Royer | 6 | 3 | 4
(Tunisia) Aziz Dougaz | 7^{8} | 2 | 2
(Spain) Daniel Rincón | 6^{6} | 6 | 6

Qualifying competition
6 | (Brazil) Thiago Monteiro | 6 | 6
(Spain) Daniel Rincón | 4 | 2

=== Seventh qualifier ===
First round
7 | (Argentina) Camilo Ugo Carabelli | 6^{1} | 4
(Spain) Bernabé Zapata Miralles | 7^{7} | 6
(Switzerland) Marc-Andrea Hüsler | 7^{7} | 2 | 4
(Italy) Francesco Maestrelli | 6^{2} | 6 | 6
(Australia) Li Tu | 6^{4} | 6 | 6
(United Kingdom) Oliver Crawford | 7^{7} | 4 | 2
(Switzerland) Leandro Riedi | 4 | 3
25 | (Kazakhstan) Mikhail Kukushkin | 6 | 6

Second round
(Spain) Bernabé Zapata Miralles | 1 | 0^{r}
(Italy) Francesco Maestrelli | 6 | 0
(Australia) Li Tu | 4 | 2
25 | (Kazakhstan) Mikhail Kukushkin | 6 | 6

Qualifying competition
(Italy) Francesco Maestrelli | 4 | 7^{7} | 3
25 | (Kazakhstan) Mikhail Kukushkin | 6 | 6^{4} | 6

=== Eighth qualifier ===
First round
8 | (Belgium) Zizou Bergs | 6 | 6
WC | (France) Clément Chidekh | 1 | 1
(Belgium) Joris De Loore | 6 | 6
(Estonia) Mark Lajal | 2 | 3
WC | (France) Maé Malige | 6 | 2 | 2
WC | (France) Mathias Bourgue | 4 | 6 | 6
(Portugal) Henrique Rocha | 6 | 6^{5} | 3
26 | (Moldova) Radu Albot | 4 | 7^{7} | 6

Second round
8 | (Belgium) Zizou Bergs | 6 | 2 | 6
(Belgium) Joris De Loore | 4 | 6 | 4
WC | (France) Mathias Bourgue | 1 | 6 | 6
26 | (Moldova) Radu Albot | 6 | 4 | 4

Qualifying competition
8 | (Belgium) Zizou Bergs | 6 | 7^{7}
WC | (France) Mathias Bourgue | 2 | 6^{4}

=== Ninth qualifier ===
First round
9 | (Peru) Juan Pablo Varillas | 0 | 6^{5}
(Argentina) Marco Trungelliti | 6 | 7^{7}
(Argentina) Genaro Alberto Olivieri | 5 | 7^{7} | 1
(Canada) Gabriel Diallo | 7 | 6^{4} | 6
(Sweden) Elias Ymer | 2 | 1
(Switzerland) Alexander Ritschard | 6 | 6
(France) Jules Marie | 6^{4} | 3
32 | (France) Titouan Droguet | 7^{7} | 6

Second round
(Argentina) Marco Trungelliti | 6^{6} | 6 | 4
(Canada) Gabriel Diallo | 7^{8} | 3 | 6
(Switzerland) Alexander Ritschard | 6 | 6
32 | (France) Titouan Droguet | 1 | 3

Qualifying competition
(Canada) Gabriel Diallo | 2 | 6 | 6
(Switzerland) Alexander Ritschard | 6 | 2 | 3

=== Tenth qualifier ===
First round
10 | (France) Grégoire Barrère | 6 | 6
WC | (France) Théo Papamalamis | 3 | 1
(United States) Maxime Cressy | 6^{4} | 6 | 6^{11}
(Italy) Andrea Pellegrino | 7^{7} | 4 | 7^{13}
(United Kingdom) Jan Choinski | 4 | 4
(United States) Denis Kudla | 6 | 6
(Hungary) Máté Valkusz | 3 | 2
19 | (Czech Republic) Vít Kopřiva | 6 | 6

Second round
10 | (France) Grégoire Barrère | 6 | 3 | 6
(Italy) Andrea Pellegrino | 2 | 6 | 4
(United States) Denis Kudla | 3 | 6 | 6
19 | (Czech Republic) Vít Kopřiva | 6 | 3 | 3

Qualifying competition
10 | (France) Grégoire Barrère | 2 | 6 | 6
(United States) Denis Kudla | 6 | 2 | 3

=== Eleventh qualifier ===
First round
11 | (Austria) Dominic Thiem | 3 | 6 | 6
(Italy) Franco Agamenone | 6 | 3 | 2
(Australia) Dane Sweeny | 2 | 3
(Finland) Otto Virtanen | 6 | 6
(Bulgaria) Adrian Andreev | 3 | 6 | 7^{10}
(Kazakhstan) Denis Yevseyev | 6 | 4 | 6^{7}
(Italy) Stefano Travaglia | 3 | 2
31 | (Italy) Giulio Zeppieri | 6 | 6

Second round
11 | (Austria) Dominic Thiem | 2 | 5
(Finland) Otto Virtanen | 6 | 7
(Bulgaria) Adrian Andreev | 6 | 5 | 3
31 | (Italy) Giulio Zeppieri | 4 | 7 | 6

Qualifying competition
(Finland) Otto Virtanen | 2 | 2
31 | (Italy) Giulio Zeppieri | 6 | 6

=== Twelfth qualifier ===
First round
12 | (Slovakia) Lukáš Klein | 6 | 3 | 6^{5}
(Brazil) Gustavo Heide | 1 | 6 | 7^{10}
(Slovakia) Alex Molčan | 3 | 5
(China) Bu Yunchaokete | 6 | 7
(Czech Republic) Dalibor Svrčina | 6 | 7
(Australia) Omar Jasika | 2 | 5
WC | (France) Sascha Gueymard Wayenburg | 4 | 7 | 4
28 | (Italy) Matteo Gigante | 6 | 5 | 6

Second round
(Brazil) Gustavo Heide | 7 | 6
(China) Bu Yunchaokete | 5 | 3
(Czech Republic) Dalibor Svrčina | 6 | 3 | 5
28 | (Italy) Matteo Gigante | 4 | 6 | 7

Qualifying competition
(Brazil) Gustavo Heide | 6 | 6
28 | (Italy) Matteo Gigante | 3 | 2

=== Thirteenth qualifier ===
First round
13 | (Argentina) Facundo Bagnis | 6 | 6
(Chile) Tomás Barrios Vera | 3 | 2
(Argentina) Juan Manuel Cerúndolo | 6 | 6
(Kazakhstan) Beibit Zhukayev | 4 | 3
(Japan) Shintaro Mochizuki | 4 | 6 | 6
(Dominican Republic) Nick Hardt | 6 | 4 | 2
(Croatia) Dino Prižmić | 6^{2} | 3
18 | (Italy) Stefano Napolitano | 7^{7} | 6

Second round
13 | (Argentina) Facundo Bagnis | 6 | 6
(Argentina) Juan Manuel Cerúndolo | 4 | 2
(Japan) Shintaro Mochizuki | 6 | 6
18 | (Italy) Stefano Napolitano | 3 | 2

Qualifying competition
13 | (Argentina) Facundo Bagnis | 4 | 0^{r}
(Japan) Shintaro Mochizuki | 6 | 2

=== Fourteenth qualifier ===
First round
14 | (Monaco) Valentin Vacherot | 4 | 6 | 7
WC | (France) Gabriel Debru | 6 | 3 | 5
(France) Enzo Couacaud | 6^{7} | 6 | 6
(South Korea) Hong Seong-chan | 7^{9} | 2 | 1
(France) Manuel Guinard | 6 | 6^{5} | 6
(Ukraine) Vitaliy Sachko | 4 | 7^{7} | 1
(United Kingdom) Billy Harris | 6 | 4 | 6
17 | (United States) Emilio Nava | 3 | 6 | 1

Second round
14 | (Monaco) Valentin Vacherot | 4 | 6 | 7
(France) Enzo Couacaud | 6 | 3 | 5
(France) Manuel Guinard | 3 | 6 | 6^{4}
(United Kingdom) Billy Harris | 6 | 3 | 7^{10}

Qualifying competition
14 | (Monaco) Valentin Vacherot | 7^{7} | 7
(United Kingdom) Billy Harris | 6^{2} | 5

=== Fifteenth qualifier ===
First round
15 | (Serbia) Hamad Medjedovic | 6 | 7
(France) Lucas Pouille | 3 | 5
(United States) Martin Damm | 7^{7} | 3 | 1
PR | (Serbia) Filip Krajinović | 6^{2} | 6 | 6
(France) Antoine Escoffier | 7 | 3 | 6^{7}
(France) Geoffrey Blancaneaux | 5 | 6 | 7^{10}
(France) Calvin Hemery | 4 | 2
21 | (Croatia) Duje Ajduković | 6 | 6

Second round
15 | (Serbia) Hamad Medjedovic | 7 | 7^{7}
PR | (Serbia) Filip Krajinović | 5 | 6^{2}
(France) Geoffrey Blancaneaux | 7 | 6
21 | (Croatia) Duje Ajduković | 5 | 4

Qualifying competition
15 | (Serbia) Hamad Medjedovic | 6 | 6
(France) Geoffrey Blancaneaux | 2 | 2

=== Sixteenth qualifier ===
First round
16 | (United States) Zachary Svajda | 6 | 6
(Hungary) Zsombor Piros | 2 | 3
(Portugal) Jaime Faria | 6 | 6
(France) Clément Tabur | 2 | 3
WC | (France) Thomas Faurel | 7^{7} | 4 | 3
(Czech Republic) Zdeněk Kolář | 6^{3} | 6 | 6
(Bosnia and Herzegovina) Nerman Fatić | 3 | 4
23 | (Brazil) Felipe Meligeni Alves | 6 | 6

Second round
16 | (United States) Zachary Svajda | 6^{3} | 1
(Portugal) Jaime Faria | 7^{7} | 6
(Czech Republic) Zdeněk Kolář | 3 | 2
23 | (Brazil) Felipe Meligeni Alves | 6 | 6

Qualifying competition
(Portugal) Jaime Faria | 4 | 2
23 | (Brazil) Felipe Meligeni Alves | 6 | 6
