= 2024 French Open – Women's singles qualifying =

Women's singles qualifying
- 2024 French Open

Details
- Draw: 128
- Seeds: 32

Events
Singles	men	women		boys	girls
Doubles	men	women	mixed	boys	girls
WC Singles	men	women	quad
WC Doubles	men	women	quad

Qualification
Singles	men	women
- French Open

The 2024 French Open – Women's singles qualifying are a series of tennis matches that will take place from 20 to 24 May 2024 to determine the qualifiers for the 2024 French Open – Women's singles, and, if necessary, the lucky losers.

Only 16 out of the 128 qualifiers who compete in this knock-out tournament, secure a main draw place.

== Seeds ==
All seeds per WTA rankings as of 6 May 2024.

1. (Italy) Sara Errani (qualified)
2. (Argentina) Julia Riera (qualified)
3. (Hungary) Anna Bondár (first round)
4. (Czech Republic) Brenda Fruhvirtová (second round)
5. (Germany) Jule Niemeier (qualified)
6. (United States) Hailey Baptiste (qualifying competition, lucky loser)
7. (Australia) Arina Rodionova (first round)
8. (United States) Katie Volynets (qualified)
9. (Japan) Moyuka Uchijima (qualified)
10. (Spain) Marina Bassols Ribera (first round)
11. (Serbia) Olga Danilović (qualified)
12. Aliaksandra Sasnovich (second round)
13. (Japan) Mai Hontama (second round, retired)
14. (United States) Claire Liu (first round)
15. (Colombia) Emiliana Arango (first round)
16. (Slovakia) Rebecca Šramková (qualified)
17. (Ukraine) Daria Snigur (second round)
18. (Latvia) Darja Semeņistaja (second round)
19. (United States) McCartney Kessler (first round)
20. (Brazil) Laura Pigossi (qualified)
21. (Croatia) Jana Fett (qualifying competition, lucky loser)
22. (Australia) Astra Sharma (qualifying competition)
23. (Netherlands) Suzan Lamens (second round)
24. (New Zealand) Lulu Sun (second round)
25. (Slovenia) Tamara Zidanšek (qualified)
26. (United Kingdom) Lily Miyazaki (first round)
27. (Hungary) Panna Udvardy (qualifying competition, lucky loser)
28. (United States) Alycia Parks (second round)
29. (Ukraine) Yuliia Starodubtseva (qualified)
30. (Australia) Taylah Preston (second round)
31. (Netherlands) Arianne Hartono (first round)
32. (Hungary) Dalma Gálfi (qualifying competition, lucky loser)

== Qualifiers ==
1. (Italy) Sara Errani
2. (Argentina) Julia Riera
3. (Germany) Eva Lys
4. (France) Léolia Jeanjean
5. (Germany) Jule Niemeier
6. (Slovenia) Tamara Zidanšek
7. (Croatia) Lucija Ćirić Bagarić
8. (United States) Katie Volynets
9. (Japan) Moyuka Uchijima
10. (Ukraine) Yuliia Starodubtseva
11. (Serbia) Olga Danilović
12. (Turkey) Zeynep Sönmez
13. (Brazil) Laura Pigossi
14. (Spain) Irene Burillo Escorihuela
15. Julia Avdeeva
16. (Slovakia) Rebecca Šramková

== Lucky losers ==
1. (Hungary) Dalma Gálfi
2. (Croatia) Jana Fett
3. (Hungary) Panna Udvardy
4. (United States) Hailey Baptiste

== Draw ==
Key

- Q = Qualifier
- WC = Wild card
- LL = Lucky loser
- Alt = Alternate
- ITF = ITF entry
- PR = Protected ranking
- SR = Special ranking
- SE = Special exempt
- JE = Junior exempt
- JR = Junior Accelerator Programme entrant
- CO = College Accelerator Programme entrant
- NG = Next Gen Accelerator Program entrant
- w/o = Walkover
- r = Retired
- d = Defaulted

=== First qualifier ===
First round
1	(Italy) Sara Errani	6	6
(United States) Ann Li	3	4
(Chinese Taipei) Yang Ya-yi	7	6^{6}	1
WC	(France) Alice Tubello	5	7^{8}	6
(Australia) Talia Gibson	1	1
(Romania) Elena-Gabriela Ruse	6	6
WC	(France) Daphnée Mpetshi Perricard	1	0
23	(Netherlands) Suzan Lamens	6	6

Second round
1	(Italy) Sara Errani	6	6
WC	(France) Alice Tubello	2	1
(Romania) Elena-Gabriela Ruse	6	6
23	(Netherlands) Suzan Lamens	3	4

Qualifying competition
1	(Italy) Sara Errani	7^{10}	7^{7}
(Romania) Elena-Gabriela Ruse	6^{8}	6^{4}

=== Second qualifier ===
First round
2	(Argentina) Julia Riera	6	6
(Serbia) Natalija Stevanović	0	2
(France) Harmony Tan	6^{3}	7^{8}	6
PR	(Germany) Nastasja Schunk	7^{7}	6^{6}	3
(Philippines) Alexandra Eala	6	6
(China) Ma Yexin	1	1
PR	(Croatia) Tara Würth	2	4
30	(Australia) Taylah Preston	6	6

Second round
2	(Argentina) Julia Riera	6	6
(France) Harmony Tan	3	2
(Philippines) Alexandra Eala	4	6	7
30	(Australia) Taylah Preston	6	4	5

Qualifying competition
2	(Argentina) Julia Riera	4	7^{7}	6
(Philippines) Alexandra Eala	6	6^{3}	4

=== Third qualifier ===
First round
3	(Hungary) Anna Bondár	7^{10}	3	4
Anastasia Zakharova	6^{8}	6	6
(Slovenia) Dalila Jakupović	4	6	6
(Romania) Irina Bara	6	3	4
(Germany) Eva Lys	6	7
WC	(France) Tiantsoa Rakotomanga Rajaonah	4	5
(Uzbekistan) Nigina Abduraimova	2	3
24	(New Zealand) Lulu Sun	6	6

Second round
Anastasia Zakharova	6	6
(Slovenia) Dalila Jakupović	4	2
(Germany) Eva Lys	6	6
24	(New Zealand) Lulu Sun	1	2

Qualifying competition
Anastasia Zakharova	3	7^{7}	1
(Germany) Eva Lys	6	6^{5}	6

=== Fourth qualifier ===
First round
4	(Czech Republic) Brenda Fruhvirtová	6	6
(Slovakia) Viktória Hrunčáková	0	3
Ekaterina Makarova	1	2
(United States) Robin Montgomery	6	6
(Romania) Andreea Mitu	5	2
(France) Léolia Jeanjean	7	6
(Switzerland) Céline Naef	2	5
18	(Latvia) Darja Semeņistaja	6	7

Second round
4	(Czech Republic) Brenda Fruhvirtová	3	6^{5}
(United States) Robin Montgomery	6	7^{7}
(France) Léolia Jeanjean	6	3	6
18	(Latvia) Darja Semeņistaja	2	6	3

Qualifying competition
(United States) Robin Montgomery	6	2	4
(France) Léolia Jeanjean	4	6	6

=== Fifth qualifier ===
First round
5	(Germany) Jule Niemeier	6	6
Alt	(Romania) Laura Ioana Paar	0	1
(United States) Lauren Davis	7	6
(Switzerland) Simona Waltert	5	2
(Australia) Jaimee Fourlis	3	3
Anastasia Tikhonova	6	6
(China) Gao Xinyu	3	6	3
32	(Hungary) Dalma Gálfi	6	4	6

Second round
5	(Germany) Jule Niemeier	6	6
(United States) Lauren Davis	3	3
Anastasia Tikhonova	3	1
32	(Hungary) Dalma Gálfi	6	6

Qualifying competition
5	(Germany) Jule Niemeier	6	6
32	(Hungary) Dalma Gálfi	4	1

=== Sixth qualifier ===
First round
6	(United States) Hailey Baptiste	3	6	6
(Greece) Valentini Grammatikopoulou	6	4	3
(Austria) Sinja Kraus	7^{8}	3	6
(United States) Elizabeth Mandlik	6^{6}	6	4
(Turkey) İpek Öz	2	6	3
(Germany) Noma Noha Akugue	6	4	6
(Slovenia) Polona Hercog	2	4
25	(Slovenia) Tamara Zidanšek	6	6

Second round
6	(United States) Hailey Baptiste	6	4	6
(Austria) Sinja Kraus	0	6	3
(Germany) Noma Noha Akugue	6	4	1
25	(Slovenia) Tamara Zidanšek	4	6	6

Qualifying competition
6	(United States) Hailey Baptiste	5	6	3
25	(Slovenia) Tamara Zidanšek	7	1	6

=== Seventh qualifier ===
First round
7	(Australia) Arina Rodionova	4	3
(Croatia) Lucija Ćirić Bagarić	6	6
(Canada) Rebecca Marino	6	7^{7}
(Argentina) Martina Capurro Taborda	3	6^{4}
(Japan) Sara Saito	6	6
(Portugal) Francisca Jorge	4	1
WC	(France) Manon Léonard	6	2	3
28	(United States) Alycia Parks	2	6	6

Second round
(Croatia) Lucija Ćirić Bagarić	6	6
(Canada) Rebecca Marino	2	3
(Japan) Sara Saito	6	6
28	(United States) Alycia Parks	2	2

Qualifying competition
(Croatia) Lucija Ćirić Bagarić	7^{7}	6
(Japan) Sara Saito	6^{5}	1

=== Eighth qualifier ===
First round
8	(United States) Katie Volynets	6	6
(Italy) Lucrezia Stefanini	2	1
(Romania) Miriam Bulgaru	6	5	7^{10}
Aliona Falei	4	7	6^{3}
(Australia) Destanee Aiava	6^{5}	4
PR	Oksana Selekhmeteva	7^{7}	6
(Greece) Despina Papamichail	5	2
17	(Ukraine) Daria Snigur	7	6

Second round
8	(United States) Katie Volynets	6	7
(Romania) Miriam Bulgaru	0	5
PR	Oksana Selekhmeteva	6	6
17	(Ukraine) Daria Snigur	2	3

Qualifying competition
8	(United States) Katie Volynets	6	6
PR	Oksana Selekhmeteva	3	4

=== Ninth qualifier ===
First round
9	(Japan) Moyuka Uchijima	6	6
(Lithuania) Justina Mikulskytė	2	1
(Croatia) Petra Marčinko	6	6
(Estonia) Kaia Kanepi	2	4
WC	(France) Astrid Lew Yan Foon	3	3
(Cyprus) Raluka Șerban	6	6
(Czech Republic) Dominika Šalková	6	2	6
31	(Netherlands) Arianne Hartono	4	6	4

Second round
9	(Japan) Moyuka Uchijima	6	6
(Croatia) Petra Marčinko	4	2
(Cyprus) Raluka Șerban	3	6	7^{13}
(Czech Republic) Dominika Šalková	6	4	6^{11}

Qualifying competition
9	(Japan) Moyuka Uchijima	7	6
(Cyprus) Raluka Șerban	5	4

=== Tenth qualifier ===
First round
10	(Spain) Marina Bassols Ribera	1	4
(Canada) Marina Stakusic	6	6
(United Kingdom) Heather Watson	3	7	1
(Croatia) Antonia Ružić	6	5	6
(Thailand) Lanlana Tararudee	0	3
(China) You Xiaodi	6	6
(Ukraine) Katarina Zavatska	3	6^{4}
29	(Ukraine) Yuliia Starodubtseva	6	7^{7}

Second round
(Canada) Marina Stakusic	6	4	7^{10}
(Croatia) Antonia Ružić	3	6	6^{6}
(China) You Xiaodi	3	2
29	(Ukraine) Yuliia Starodubtseva	6	6

Qualifying competition
(Canada) Marina Stakusic	3	2
29	(Ukraine) Yuliia Starodubtseva	6	6

=== Eleventh qualifier ===
First round
11	(Serbia) Olga Danilović	6	4	6
(Romania) Anca Todoni	1	6	1
Polina Kudermetova	6	0	3
(Australia) Kimberly Birrell	2	6	6
(Hungary) Tímea Babos	6	6
(Spain) Nuria Párrizas Díaz	4	4
(Germany) Ella Seidel	6	6^{4}	2
22	(Australia) Astra Sharma	2	7^{7}	6

Second round
11	(Serbia) Olga Danilović	6	6
(Australia) Kimberly Birrell	3	3
(Hungary) Tímea Babos	3	4
22	(Australia) Astra Sharma	6	6

Qualifying competition
11	(Serbia) Olga Danilović	7^{7}	7
22	(Australia) Astra Sharma	6^{2}	5

=== Twelfth qualifier ===
First round
12	Aliaksandra Sasnovich	6	6
WC	(France) Jenny Lim	4	2
(Turkey) Zeynep Sönmez	6	6
(Serbia) Dejana Radanović	3	2
(Croatia) Lea Bošković	6	2	6
(Japan) Himeno Sakatsume	4	6	3
WC	(France) Séléna Janicijevic	6	0	3
21	(Croatia) Jana Fett	2	6	6

Second round
12	Aliaksandra Sasnovich	7^{7}	3	4
(Turkey) Zeynep Sönmez	6^{3}	6	6
(Croatia) Lea Bošković	3	2
21	(Croatia) Jana Fett	6	6

Qualifying competition
(Turkey) Zeynep Sönmez	7^{7}	6
21	(Croatia) Jana Fett	6^{5}	3

=== Thirteenth qualifier ===
First round
13	(Japan) Mai Hontama	7	5	7
(Canada) Carol Zhao	5	7	5
(Romania) Cristina Dinu	6	6
PR	(Argentina) Paula Ormaechea	2	0
(Poland) Katarzyna Kawa	6	6
(Czech Republic) Gabriela Knutson	2	4
(United States) Elvina Kalieva	1	1
20	(Brazil) Laura Pigossi	6	6

Second round
13	(Japan) Mai Hontama	2^{r}
(Romania) Cristina Dinu	5
(Poland) Katarzyna Kawa	2	3
20	(Brazil) Laura Pigossi	6	6

Qualifying competition
(Romania) Cristina Dinu	2	2
20	(Brazil) Laura Pigossi	6	6

=== Fourteenth qualifier ===
First round
14	(United States) Claire Liu	6	3	3
(Slovenia) Veronika Erjavec	2	6	6
(France) Carole Monnet	3	0
(Spain) Irene Burillo Escorihuela	6	6
(Croatia) Tena Lukas	6	1	2
(Switzerland) Jil Teichmann	2	6	6
(China) Wei Sijia	6	6
26	(United Kingdom) Lily Miyazaki	1	1

Second round
(Slovenia) Veronika Erjavec	4	3
(Spain) Irene Burillo Escorihuela	6	6
(Switzerland) Jil Teichmann	6	6
(China) Wei Sijia	4	3

Qualifying competition
(Spain) Irene Burillo Escorihuela	6	7^{7}
(Switzerland) Jil Teichmann	1	6^{1}

=== Fifteenth qualifier ===
First round
15	(Colombia) Emiliana Arango	4	6	3
Julia Avdeeva	6	2	6
WC	(France) Margaux Rouvroy	6	5	6
(North Macedonia) Lina Gjorcheska	2	7	3
(Ukraine) Kateryna Baindl	6	5	3
(Argentina) Solana Sierra	1	7	6
(Australia) Olivia Gadecki	7^{7}	6
19	(United States) McCartney Kessler	6^{4}	1

Second round
Julia Avdeeva	6	6
WC	(France) Margaux Rouvroy	2	3
(Argentina) Solana Sierra	2	4
(Australia) Olivia Gadecki	6	6

Qualifying competition
Julia Avdeeva	1	6	6
(Australia) Olivia Gadecki	6	3	2

=== Sixteenth qualifier ===
First round
16	(Slovakia) Rebecca Šramková	6	6
WC	(France) Sarah Iliev	4	1
(Czech Republic) Linda Fruhvirtová	6	6
Iryna Shymanovich	4	2
(Germany) Mona Barthel	6^{5}	3
(Australia) Priscilla Hon	7^{7}	6
(Czech Republic) Tereza Martincová	5	4
27	(Hungary) Panna Udvardy	7	6

Second round
16	(Slovakia) Rebecca Šramková	6	3	6
(Czech Republic) Linda Fruhvirtová	2	6	4
(Australia) Priscilla Hon	4	4
27	(Hungary) Panna Udvardy	6	6

Qualifying competition
16	(Slovakia) Rebecca Šramková	7	3	7^{10}
27	(Hungary) Panna Udvardy	5	6	6^{2}
