= 2024 French Open – Boys' singles =

Boys' singles
- 2024 French Open

Final
- Champion: (United States) Kaylan Bigun
- Runner-up: (Poland) Tomasz Berkieta
- Score: 4–6, 6–3, 6–3

Events
Singles	men	women		boys	girls
Doubles	men	women	mixed	boys	girls
WC Singles	men	women	quad	boys	girls
WC Doubles	men	women	quad	boys	girls
- French Open

Kaylan Bigun won the boys' singles title at the 2024 French Open, defeating Tomasz Berkieta in the final, 4–6, 6–3, 6–3. Bigun became the first American player to win the junior boys' singles title since Tommy Paul in 2015.

Dino Prižmić was the defending champion, but was no longer eligible to compete in junior events. He played in the men's singles qualifying competition, where he lost to Stefano Napolitano in the first round.

== Seeds ==
1. (Japan) Rei Sakamoto (quarterfinals)
2. (Austria) Joel Schwärzler (semifinals)
3. (Norway) Nicolai Budkov Kjær (first round)
4. (Romania) Luca Preda (second round)
5. (United States) Kaylan Bigun (champion)
6. (Australia) Hayden Jones (second round)
7. (Italy) Federico Cinà (third round)
8. (Czech Republic) Maxim Mrva (second round)
9. (South Korea) Kim Jang-jun (first round)
10. (Czech Republic) Petr Brunclík (quarterfinals)
11. (Netherlands) Mees Röttgering (first round)
12. (Colombia) Miguel Tobón (third round)
13. (Kazakhstan) Amir Omarkhanov (first round)
14. (Morocco) Reda Bennani (third round)
15. (France) Thomas Faurel (first round)
16. (France) Théo Papamalamis (third round)

Click on the seed number of a player to go to their draw section.

== Draw ==
Key

- Q = Qualifier
- WC = Wild card
- LL = Lucky loser
- Alt = Alternate
- ITF = ITF entry
- PR = Protected ranking
- SR = Special ranking
- SE = Special exempt
- JE = Junior exempt
- JR = Junior Accelerator Programme entrant
- CO = College Accelerator Programme entrant
- NG = Next Gen Accelerator Program entrant
- w/o = Walkover
- r = Retired
- d = Defaulted

=== Finals ===
Quarterfinals
1	(Japan) Rei Sakamoto	6	1	4
(Italy) Lorenzo Carboni	4	6	6
WC	(France) Moïse Kouamé	3	2
(Poland) Tomasz Berkieta	6	6
5	(United States) Kaylan Bigun	6	5	6
Q	(Switzerland) Henry Bernet	2	7	4
10	(Czech Republic) Petr Brunclík	2	6^{6}
2	(Austria) Joel Schwärzler	6	7^{8}

Semifinals
(Italy) Lorenzo Carboni	6^{3}	6	6^{4}
(Poland) Tomasz Berkieta	7^{7}	4	7^{10}
5	(United States) Kaylan Bigun	2	6	6
2	(Austria) Joel Schwärzler	6	3	4

Final
(Poland) Tomasz Berkieta	6	3	3
5	(United States) Kaylan Bigun	4	6	6

=== Top half ===
==== Section 1 ====
First round
1	(Japan) Rei Sakamoto	6	7^{9}
(Sweden) William Rejchtman Vinciguerra	4	6^{7}
WC	(Brazil) Luís Miguel	6	4	6
(United Kingdom) Benjamin Gusic Wan	4	6	3
(United States) Cooper Woestendick	6	4	6
(Cyprus) Andreas Timini	3	6	2
Q	(Bulgaria) Alexander Vasilev	1	6^{5}
16	(France) Théo Papamalamis	6	7^{7}
11	(Netherlands) Mees Röttgering	6^{2}	6	2
(France) Maé Malige	7^{7}	4	6
(United States) Matthew Forbes	2	1
Daniil Sarksian	6	6
WC	(France) Pierre Antoine Faut	6	4	4
(Italy) Lorenzo Carboni	0	6	6
(Germany) Max Stenzer	2	4
8	(Czech Republic) Maxim Mrva	6	6

Second round
1	(Japan) R Sakamoto	6	6
WC	(Brazil) L Miguel	0	0
(United States) C Woestendick	6^{7}	2
16	(France) T Papamalamis	7^{9}	6
(France) M Malige	6	6
D Sarksian	1	4
(Italy) L Carboni	6	6
8	(Czech Republic) M Mrva	2	3

Third round
1	(Japan) R Sakamoto	6	6
16	(France) T Papamalamis	4	4
(France) M Malige	3	2
(Italy) L Carboni	6	6

Quarterfinals
1	(Japan) R Sakamoto	6	1	4
(Italy) L Carboni	4	6	6

==== Section 2 ====
First round
4	(Romania) Luca Preda	3	6	6
(Argentina) Máximo Zeitune	6	4	3
WC	(France) Moïse Kouamé	2	7^{7}	7
(China) Zhang Tianhui	6	6^{3}	5
(United States) Jagger Leach	6^{5}	1
Q	(Italy) Daniele Rapagnetta	7^{7}	6
WC	(France) Raphaël Vaksmann	3	3
14	(Morocco) Reda Bennani	6	6
9	(South Korea) Kim Jang-jun	7^{7}	3	4
Q	(United Kingdom) Charlie Robertson	6^{4}	6	6
WC	(France) Lucas Marionneau	3	6^{5}
(United States) Alexander Razeghi	6	7^{7}
(Poland) Tomasz Berkieta	6	6
(Spain) Izan Almazán Valiente	3	2
Q	(Czech Republic) Jan Klimas	4	6	2
6	(Australia) Hayden Jones	6	4	6

Second round
4	(Romania) L Preda	3	6	4
WC	(France) M Kouamé	6	0	6
Q	(Italy) D Rapagnetta	6^{5}	4
14	(Morocco) R Bennani	7^{7}	6
Q	(United Kingdom) C Robertson	6	7^{7}
(United States) A Razeghi	2	6^{4}
(Poland) T Berkieta	6	6
6	(Australia) H Jones	4	4

Third round
WC	(France) M Kouamé	7	6
14	(Morocco) R Bennani	5	4
Q	(United Kingdom) C Robertson	3	6	4
(Poland) T Berkieta	6	3	6

Quarterfinals
WC	(France) M Kouamé	3	2
(Poland) T Berkieta	6	6

=== Bottom half ===
==== Section 3 ====
First round
5	(United States) Kaylan Bigun	6	6
(United Kingdom) Viktor Frydrych	1	3
Q	(Czech Republic) Denis Peták	1	7^{8}	3
WC	(France) Timeo Trufelli	6	6^{6}	6
SE	Egor Pleshivtsev	5	6	6
(Australia) Pavle Marinkov	7	4	2
(South Korea) Roh Ho-young	6^{4}	4
12	(Colombia) Miguel Tobón	7^{7}	6
15	(France) Thomas Faurel	5	5
(Italy) Andrea De Marchi	7	7
SE	(Spain) Andrés Santamarta Roig	4	6	6
(United States) Ian Mayew	6	2	2
WC	(France) Felix Balshaw	3	2
(Germany) Max Schönhaus	6	6
Q	(Switzerland) Henry Bernet	6	6
3	(Norway) Nicolai Budkov Kjær	1	3

Second round
5	(United States) K Bigun	6	6
WC	(France) T Trufelli	1	2
SE	E Pleshivtsev	7^{7}	4	4
12	(Colombia) M Tobón	6^{3}	6	6
(Italy) A De Marchi	1	7^{7}	6
SE	(Spain) A Santamarta Roig	6	6^{2}	3
(Germany) M Schönhaus	2	6	3
Q	(Switzerland) H Bernet	6	3	6

Third round
5	(United States) K Bigun	6	6
12	(Colombia) M Tobón	4	1
(Italy) A De Marchi	4	3
Q	(Switzerland) H Bernet	6	6

Quarterfinals
5	(United States) K Bigun	6	5	6
Q	(Switzerland) H Bernet	2	7	4

==== Section 4 ====
First round
7	(Italy) Federico Cinà	6	6
(Japan) Naoya Honda	2	2
(United States) Maxwell Exsted	6	6
(France) Nathan Trouvé	0	4
(United Kingdom) Oliver Bonding	1	3
Q	(Brazil) Gustavo Ribeiro de Almeida	6	6
(France) Charlie Camus	2	1
10	(Czech Republic) Petr Brunclík	6	6
13	(Kazakhstan) Amir Omarkhanov	2	2
(Spain) Rafael Jódar	6	6
WC	(France) Daniel Jade	6	2	0
Timofei Derepasko	4	6	6
Q	(Canada) Keegan Rice	7^{7}	6
(Turkey) Atakan Karahan	6^{4}	0
(United States) Jack Kennedy	6	3	2
2	(Austria) Joel Schwärzler	4	6	6

Second round
7	(Italy) F Cinà	6	6
(United States) M Exsted	0	2
Q	(Brazil) G Ribeiro de Almeida	3	7^{7}	4
10	(Czech Republic) P Brunclík	6	6^{5}	6
(Spain) R Jódar	6	6
T Derepasko	3	0
Q	(Canada) K Rice	4	2
2	(Austria) J Schwärzler	6	6

Third round
7	(Italy) F Cinà	6^{2}	4
10	(Czech Republic) P Brunclík	7^{7}	6
(Spain) R Jódar	5	3
2	(Austria) J Schwärzler	7	6

Quarterfinals
10	(Czech Republic) P Brunclík	2	6^{6}
2	(Austria) J Schwärzler	6	7^{8}

== Qualifying ==
=== Seeds ===
1. (Switzerland) Henry Bernet (qualified)
2. (Italy) Daniele Rapagnetta (qualified)
3. (United Kingdom) Charlie Robertson (qualified)
4. (Bulgaria) Alexander Vasilev (qualified)
5. (Serbia) Ognjen Milić (qualifying competition)
6. (Germany) Diego Dedura-Palomero (qualifying competition)
7. (United States) Kase Schinnerer (first round)
8. (Brazil) Gustavo Ribeiro de Almeida (qualified)
9. (South Korea) Hwang Dong-hyun (qualifying competition)
10. (Bulgaria) Anas Mazdrashki (qualifying competition)
11. (Italy) Lorenzo Angelini (qualifying competition)
12. (Morocco) Karim Bennani (first round)
13. (Czech Republic) Jan Klimas (qualified)
14. Ivan Iutkin (qualifying competition)
15. (Tunisia) Alaa Trifi (first round)
16. (Brazil) Enzo Kohlmann de Freitas (qualifying competition)

=== Qualifiers ===
1. (Switzerland) Henry Bernet
2. (Italy) Daniele Rapagnetta
3. (United Kingdom) Charlie Robertson
4. (Bulgaria) Alexander Vasilev
5. (Czech Republic) Jan Klimas
6. (Czech Republic) Denis Peták
7. (Canada) Keegan Rice
8. (Brazil) Gustavo Ribeiro de Almeida

=== Draw ===
==== First qualifier ====
First round
1	(Switzerland) Henry Bernet	6	6
WC	(France) Mickael Kaouk	3	2
(Spain) Pablo Martínez Gómez	4	6	4
10	(Bulgaria) Anas Mazdrashki	6	2	6

Qualifying competition
1	(Switzerland) Henry Bernet	6	6
10	(Bulgaria) Anas Mazdrashki	4	1

==== Second qualifier ====
First round
2	(Italy) Daniele Rapagnetta	7	3	6
WC	(France) Victor Barreira Bonzom	5	6	2
(Peru) Luis José Nakamine	1	5
16	(Brazil) Enzo Kohlmann de Freitas	6	7

Qualifying competition
2	(Italy) Daniele Rapagnetta	6	7^{7}
16	(Brazil) Enzo Kohlmann de Freitas	3	6^{5}

==== Third qualifier ====
First round
3	(United Kingdom) Charlie Robertson	6	6
WC	(France) Evan Simon	3	0
(Nicaragua) Joaquín Guilleme	3	6	7
15	(Tunisia) Alaa Trifi	6	2	5

Qualifying competition
3	(United Kingdom) Charlie Robertson	7	6
(Nicaragua) Joaquín Guilleme	5	2

==== Fourth qualifier ====
First round
4	(Bulgaria) Alexander Vasilev	6	6
WC	(France) Lenny Couturier	1	1
(Kazakhstan) Danial Rakhmatullayev	6	4	2
9	(South Korea) Hwang Dong-hyun	3	6	6

Qualifying competition
4	(Bulgaria) Alexander Vasilev	6	6
9	(South Korea) Hwang Dong-hyun	2	4

==== Fifth qualifier ====
First round
5	(Serbia) Ognjen Milić	6	6
(South Korea) Jeong Yeon-su	2	3
WC	(France) Ferdinand Livet Novkirichka	7^{7}	4	4
13	(Czech Republic) Jan Klimas	6^{3}	6	6

Qualifying competition
5	(Serbia) Ognjen Milić	4	2
13	(Czech Republic) Jan Klimas	6	6

==== Sixth qualifier ====
First round
6	(Germany) Diego Dedura-Palomero	7	6
(Ukraine) Nikita Bilozertsev	5	4
(Czech Republic) Denis Peták	6	6
12	(Morocco) Karim Bennani	4	2

Qualifying competition
6	(Germany) Diego Dedura-Palomero	5	6	1
(Czech Republic) Denis Peták	7	1	6

==== Seventh qualifier ====
First round
7	(United States) Kase Schinnerer	5	1
(Canada) Keegan Rice	7	6
WC	(France) Mathys Domenc	3	6	1
14	Ivan Iutkin	6	4	6

Qualifying competition
(Canada) Keegan Rice	6	6
14	Ivan Iutkin	1	2

==== Eighth qualifier ====
First round
8	(Brazil) Gustavo Ribeiro de Almeida	7^{7}	6
(Romania) Ștefan Horia Haita	6^{4}	4
(United States) Noah Johnston	6	4	5
11	(Italy) Lorenzo Angelini	3	6	7

Qualifying competition
8	(Brazil) Gustavo Ribeiro de Almeida	6	6
11	(Italy) Lorenzo Angelini	1	3
