= 2024 French Open – Wheelchair girls' doubles =

Wheelchair girls' doubles
- 2024 French Open

Final
- Champions: (France) Ksénia Chasteau (United States) Maylee Phelps
- Runners-up: (Brazil) Vitória Miranda (Japan) Yuma Takamuro
- Score: 3–6, 6–0, [18–16]

Events
| Singles | men | women | | boys | girls |
| Doubles | men | women | mixed | boys | girls |
| WC Singles | men | women | quad | boys | girls |
| WC Doubles | men | women | quad | boys | girls |
- French Open

The 2024 French Open – Wheelchair Girls' Doubles was the inaugural edition of the junior wheelchair tournament at Roland Garros.

France's Ksénia Chasteau and America's Maylee Phelps defeated Brazilian Vitória Miranda and Japan's Yuma Takamuro 3–6, 6–0, [18-16] after an epic tiebreak.

== Background ==
The 2024 French Open marked the first edition of junior wheelchair categories, both in singles and doubles.

== Draw ==
Key

- Q = Qualifier
- WC = Wild card
- LL = Lucky loser
- Alt = Alternate
- ITF = ITF entry
- PR = Protected ranking
- SR = Special ranking
- SE = Special exempt
- JE = Junior exempt
- JR = Junior Accelerator Programme entrant
- CO = College Accelerator Programme entrant
- NG = Next Gen Accelerator Program entrant
- w/o = Walkover
- r = Retired
- d = Defaulted

=== Final ===
| Final |
| (France) Ksénia Chasteau (United States) Maylee Phelps | 3 | 6 | [18] |
| (Brazil) Vitória Miranda (Japan) Yuma Takamuro | 6 | 0 | [16] |
