= 2024 French Open – Wheelchair boys' singles =

2024 tennis event results

Wheelchair boys' singles
- 2024 French Open

Final
- Champion: (Australia) Maximilian Taucher
- Runner-up: (Netherlands) Ivar van Rijt
- Score: 2–6, 6–4, 7–6^{(10–8)}

Events
Singles	men	women		boys	girls
Doubles	men	women	mixed	boys	girls
WC Singles	men	women	quad	boys	girls
WC Doubles	men	women	quad	boys	girls
- French Open

No.1 seed Maximilian Taucher was the winner of the inaugural Roland-Garros junior boys' wheelchair singles final with a 2–6, 6–4, 7-6[10-8] win over Ivar van Rijt.

== Seeds ==
1. (Austria) Maximilian Taucher (champion)
2. (Netherlands) Ivar van Rijt (final)

== Draw ==
Key

- Q = Qualifier
- WC = Wild card
- LL = Lucky loser
- Alt = Alternate
- ITF = ITF entry
- PR = Protected ranking
- SR = Special ranking
- SE = Special exempt
- JE = Junior exempt
- JR = Junior Accelerator Programme entrant
- CO = College Accelerator Programme entrant
- NG = Next Gen Accelerator Program entrant
- w/o = Walkover
- r = Retired
- d = Defaulted

=== Draw ===
Semifinals
1	(Austria) Maximilian Taucher	7	6
(United Kingdom) Ruben Harris	5	2
(Australia) Yassin Hill	2	0
2	(Netherlands) Ivar van Rijt	6	6

Final
1	(Austria) Maximilian Taucher	2	6	7^{10}
2	(Netherlands) Ivar van Rijt	6	4	6^{8}
