= Kaylan Bigun =

American tennis player (born 2006)

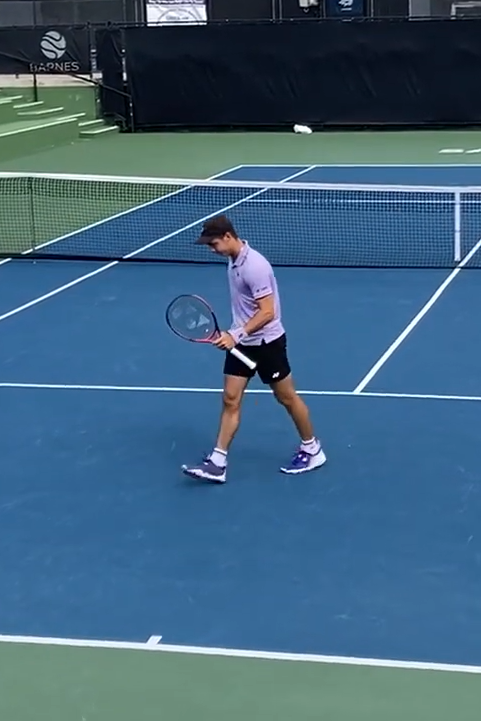
- Bigun in 2023
- Country (sports): United States
- Born: May 23, 2006 (age 20) Los Angeles, California, U.S.
- Height: 6 ft 0 in (1.83 m)
- Plays: Left-handed (two-handed backhand)
- Prize money: US $84,801

Singles
- Career record: 0–0 (at ATP Tour level, Grand Slam level, and in Davis Cup)
- Career titles: 0
- Highest ranking: No. 494 (November 16, 2026)
- Current ranking: No. 494 (November 16, 2026)

Grand Slam singles results
- US Open: Q1 (2024)

Doubles
- Career record: 0–0 (at ATP Tour level, Grand Slam level, and in Davis Cup)
- Career titles: 0
- Highest ranking: No. 1,740 (December 4, 2023)

Grand Slam mixed doubles results
- US Open: 2R (2024)
- Last updated on: November 16, 2026.

Kaylan Bigun (born May 23, 2006) is an American tennis player. He has a career-high ATP singles ranking of No. 494 achieved on November 16, 2026 and a doubles ranking of No. 1,740 achieved on December 4, 2023.

After winning the boys' singles title at the 2024 French Open, he reached a ITF junior combined ranking of No. 1 on June 10, 2024.

== Early life ==
Bigun was born in Los Angeles. His father, Dimitry, was born in Ukraine but moved to Los Angeles when he was a teenager. He is Jewish.

He trains in California and the USTA Center in Florida. His twin brother, Meecah Bigun, is also a tennis player. In January 2024, he signed a letter of intent to play tennis at the University of California, Los Angeles.

== Junior career ==
Bigun represented the United States at the 2022 Junior Davis Cup in Antalya, reaching the final. His twin brother, Meecah, was also on the team. In 2023, he was a reached the singles quarterfinals of Wimbledon and the semifinals of the Junior Orange Bowl.

In 2024, at the Australian Open, he reached the quarterfinals in singles and the semifinals in doubles with partner Jagger Leach. At the French Open, he reached the doubles quarterfinals seeded fourth with Leach. Seeded fifth in singles, he won the title with wins over Viktor Frydrych, wildcard Timeo Trufelli, 12th seed Miguel Tobón Jr., qualifier Henry Bernet, second seed Joel Schwärzler, and Tomasz Berkieta. Bigun became the first American player to win the junior boys' singles title since Tommy Paul in 2015. Following his victory, he became the junior world No. 1, surpassing Rei Sakamoto.

== Professional career ==
In April 2024, Bigun qualified for the main draw of the Sarasota Open.

== Junior Grand Slam finals ==
=== Singles: 1 (title) ===
Result	Year	Tournament	Surface	Opponent	Score
Win	2024	French Open	Clay	(Poland) Tomasz Berkieta	4–6, 6–3, 6–3
