= 2024 French Open – Wheelchair girls' singles =

Wheelchair girls' singles
- 2024 French Open

Final
- Champion: (France) Ksénia Chasteau
- Runner-up: (United States) Maylee Phelps
- Score: 6–2, 6–3

Events
Singles	men	women		boys	girls
Doubles	men	women	mixed	boys	girls
WC Singles	men	women	quad	boys	girls
WC Doubles	men	women	quad	boys	girls
- French Open

No.1 seed Ksénia Chasteau was the winner of the inaugural Roland-Garros junior girls' wheelchair singles final with a 6–2, 6–3 win over Maylee Phelps.

== Seeds ==
1. (France) Ksénia Chasteau (champion)
2. (Brazil) Vitória Miranda (semifinals)

== Draw ==
Key

- Q = Qualifier
- WC = Wild card
- LL = Lucky loser
- Alt = Alternate
- ITF = ITF entry
- PR = Protected ranking
- SR = Special ranking
- SE = Special exempt
- JE = Junior exempt
- JR = Junior Accelerator Programme entrant
- CO = College Accelerator Programme entrant
- NG = Next Gen Accelerator Program entrant
- w/o = Walkover
- r = Retired
- d = Defaulted

=== Draw ===
Semifinals
1	(France) Ksénia Chasteau	6	6
(Japan) Yuma Takamuro	1	3
(United States) Maylee Phelps	6	7
2	(Brazil) Vitória Miranda	2	5

Final
1	(France) Ksénia Chasteau	6	6
(United States) Maylee Phelps	2	3
