= 2024 French Open – Boys' doubles =

Boys' doubles
- 2024 French Open

Final
- Champions: (Norway) Nicolai Budkov Kjær (Austria) Joel Schwärzler
- Runners-up: (Italy) Federico Cinà (Japan) Rei Sakamoto
- Score: 6–4, 7–6^{(7–3)}

Events
Singles	men	women		boys	girls
Doubles	men	women	mixed	boys	girls
WC Singles	men	women	quad	boys	girls
WC Doubles	men	women	quad	boys	girls
- French Open

Nicolai Budkov Kjær and Joel Schwärzler won the boys' doubles title at the 2024 French Open, defeating Federico Cinà and Rei Sakamoto in the final, 6–4, 7–6^{(7–3)}. Schwärzler became the first Austrian player to win a junior boys' major title since Lucas Miedler at the 2014 Australian Open. Budkov Kjær became the first Norwegian player to win a major title in any discipline. The pair saved a match point en route to the title, in the semifinals against Timofei Derepasko and Amir Omarkhanov.

Yaroslav Demin and Rodrigo Pacheco Méndez were the defending champions, but were no longer eligible to participate in junior events.

== Seeds ==
1. (Norway) Nicolai Budkov Kjær / (Austria) Joel Schwärzler (champions)
2. (Italy) Federico Cinà / (Japan) Rei Sakamoto (final)
3. (France) Thomas Faurel / (Romania) Luca Preda (quarterfinals)
4. (United States) Kaylan Bigun / (United States) Jagger Leach (quarterfinals)
5. (France) Charlie Camus / (Australia) Hayden Jones (second round)
6. (United Kingdom) Viktor Frydrych / (Netherlands) Mees Röttgering (quarterfinals, withdrew)
7. (United States) Maxwell Exsted / (United States) Cooper Woestendick (quarterfinals, withdrew)
8. (South Korea) Kim Jang-jun / (China) Zhang Tianhui (first round)

== Draw ==
Key

- Q = Qualifier
- WC = Wild card
- LL = Lucky loser
- Alt = Alternate
- ITF = ITF entry
- PR = Protected ranking
- SR = Special ranking
- SE = Special exempt
- JE = Junior exempt
- JR = Junior Accelerator Programme entrant
- CO = College Accelerator Programme entrant
- NG = Next Gen Accelerator Program entrant
- w/o = Walkover
- r = Retired
- d = Defaulted

=== Finals ===
Semifinals
1	(Norway) Nicolai Budkov Kjær (Austria) Joel Schwärzler	4	6	[11]
Timofei Derepasko (Kazakhstan) Amir Omarkhanov	6	2	[9]
(United States) Alexander Razeghi (Germany) Max Schönhaus	5	6	[7]
2	(Italy) Federico Cinà (Japan) Rei Sakamoto	7	2	[10]

Final
1	(Norway) Nicolai Budkov Kjær (Austria) Joel Schwärzler	6	7^{7}
2	(Italy) Federico Cinà (Japan) Rei Sakamoto	4	6^{3}

=== Top half ===
First round
1	(Norway) Nicolai Budkov Kjær (Austria) Joel Schwärzler	7^{7}	6
(Turkey) Atakan Karahan (South Korea) Roh Ho-young	6^{5}	3
(Czech Republic) Jan Klimas (Czech Republic) Maxim Mrva	2	5
(Switzerland) Henry Bernet (Germany) Max Stenzer	6	7
WC	(France) Moïse Kouamé (France) Timeo Trufelli	2	6^{5}
(Morocco) Karim Bennani (Morocco) Reda Bennani	6	7^{7}
(Japan) Naoya Honda; Daniil Sarksian	6^{2}	4
7	(United States) Maxwell Exsted (United States) Cooper Woestendick	7^{7}	6
3	(France) Thomas Faurel (Romania) Luca Preda	7^{7}	6
(Colombia) Miguel Tobón (Argentina) Máximo Zeitune	6^{1}	4
WC	(France) Felix Balshaw (France) Lucas Marionneau	2	2
(Poland) Tomasz Berkieta (United Kingdom) Charlie Robertson	6	6
WC	(France) Pierre Antoine Faut (France) Daniel Jade	6^{5}	2
Timofei Derepasko (Kazakhstan) Amir Omarkhanov	7^{7}	6
(Brazil) Gustavo Ribero de Almeida (Brazil) Enzo Kohlmann de Freitas	4	6	[8]
5	(France) Charlie Camus (Australia) Hayden Jones	6	3	[10]

Second round
1	(Norway) N Budkov Kjær (Austria) J Schwärzler	6	6
(Switzerland) H Bernet (Germany) M Stenzer	1	3
(Morocco) K Bennani (Morocco) R Bennani	1	3
7	(United States) M Exsted (United States) C Woestendick	6	6
3	(France) T Faurel (Romania) L Preda	w/o
(Poland) T Berkieta (United Kingdom) C Robertson
T Derepasko (Kazakhstan) A Omarkhanov	7^{7}	6
5	(France) C Camus (Australia) H Jones	6^{4}	2

Quarterfinals
1	(Norway) N Budkov Kjær (Austria) J Schwärzler	w/o
7	(United States) M Exsted (United States) C Woestendick
3	(France) T Faurel (Romania) L Preda	4	6	[10]
T Derepasko (Kazakhstan) A Omarkhanov	6	4	[12]

Semifinals
1	(Norway) N Budkov Kjær (Austria) J Schwärzler	4	6	[11]
T Derepasko (Kazakhstan) A Omarkhanov	6	2	[9]

=== Bottom half ===
First round
8	(South Korea) Kim Jang-jun (China) Zhang Tianhui	4	7	[2]
(United States) Alexander Razeghi (Germany) Max Schönhaus	6	5	[10]
(Spain) Rafael Jódar (Spain) Andrés Santamarta Roig	6	4	[10]
(United States) Matthew Forbes (United Kingdom) Benjamin Gusic Wan	3	6	[5]
(Spain) Izan Almazán Valiente (Cyprus) Andreas Timini	7	6
WC	(France) Alexis Berquier (France) Evan Jarzaguet	5	2
(Czech Republic) Petr Brunclík (Canada) Keegan Rice	5	6^{2}
4	(United States) Kaylan Bigun (United States) Jagger Leach	7	7^{7}
6	(United Kingdom) Viktor Frydrych (Netherlands) Mees Röttgering	6	6
(Italy) Lorenzo Carboni (Italy) Andrea De Marchi	2	2
(United Kingdom) Oliver Bonding (Australia) Pavle Marinkov	6	6
(France) Nathan Trouvé (France) Raphaël Vaksmann	4	3
(United States) Jack Kennedy (United States) Ian Mayew	6	5	[10]
(Sweden) William Rejchtman Vinciguerra (Bulgaria) Alexander Vasilev	2	7	[4]
(France) Maé Malige (France) Théo Papamalamis	6^{1}	1
2	(Italy) Federico Cinà (Japan) Rei Sakamoto	7^{7}	6

Second round
(United States) A Razeghi (Germany) M Schönhaus	6	6
(Spain) R Jódar (Spain) A Santamarta Roig	3	3
(Spain) I Almazán Valiente (Cyprus) A Timini	6^{3}	2
4	(United States) K Bigun (United States) J Leach	7^{7}	6
6	(United Kingdom) V Frydrych (Netherlands) M Röttgering	6^{2}	6	[10]
(United Kingdom) O Bonding (Australia) P Marinkov	7^{7}	1	[5]
(United States) J Kennedy (United States) I Mayew	2	3
2	(Italy) F Cinà (Japan) R Sakamoto	6	6

Quarterfinals
(United States) A Razeghi (Germany) M Schönhaus	4	6	[10]
4	(United States) K Bigun (United States) J Leach	6	3	[4]
6	(United Kingdom) V Frydrych (Netherlands) M Röttgering
2	(Italy) F Cinà (Japan) R Sakamoto	w/o

Semifinals
(United States) A Razeghi (Germany) M Schönhaus	5	6	[7]
2	(Italy) F Cinà (Japan) R Sakamoto	7	2	[10]
