= 2024 French Open – Wheelchair boys' doubles =

Wheelchair boys' doubles
- 2024 French Open

Final
- Champions: (United Kingdom) Ruben Harris (Austria) Maximilian Taucher
- Runners-up: (Australia) Yassin Hill (Netherlands) Ivar van Rijt
- Score: 7–5, 6–4

Events
Singles	men	women		boys	girls
Doubles	men	women	mixed	boys	girls
WC Singles	men	women	quad	boys	girls
WC Doubles	men	women	quad	boys	girls
- French Open

The 2024 French Open – Wheelchair Boys' Doubles was the inaugural edition of the junior wheelchair tournament at Roland Garros.

Great Britain's Ruben Harris partnered Austria's Maximilian Taucher to seal the inaugural French Open boys’ wheelchair doubles title, with set scores of 7–5, 6–4.

== Background ==
The 2024 French Open marked the first edition of junior wheelchair categories, both in singles and doubles.

== Draw ==
Key

- Q = Qualifier
- WC = Wild card
- LL = Lucky loser
- Alt = Alternate
- ITF = ITF entry
- PR = Protected ranking
- SR = Special ranking
- SE = Special exempt
- JE = Junior exempt
- JR = Junior Accelerator Programme entrant
- CO = College Accelerator Programme entrant
- NG = Next Gen Accelerator Program entrant
- w/o = Walkover
- r = Retired
- d = Defaulted

=== Final ===
Final
(United Kingdom) Ruben Harris (Austria) Maximilian Taucher	7	6
(Australia) Yassin Hill (Netherlands) Ivar van Rijt	5	4
