= Tomasz Berkieta =

Polish tennis player (born 2006)

- Country (sports): Poland
- Born: 21 July 2006 (age 20) Warsaw, Poland
- Height: 1.91 m (6 ft 3 in)
- Plays: Right handed (two-handed backhand)
- Coach: Piotr Sierzputowski
- Prize money: US $54,047

Singles
- Career record: 1–1 (at ATP Tour level, Grand Slam level, and in Davis Cup)
- Career titles: 0
- Highest ranking: No. 479 (20 April 2026)
- Current ranking: No. 541 (10 August 2026)

Doubles
- Career record: 0–0 (at ATP Tour level, Grand Slam level, and in Davis Cup)
- Career titles: 0
- Highest ranking: No. 619 (23 February 2026)
- Current ranking: No. 651 (10 August 2026)
- Last updated on: 10 August 2026.

Tomasz Berkieta (Polish: [ˈtɔmaʐ bɛrˈkʲɛta]; born 21 July 2006) is a Polish professional tennis player. He has a career-high ATP singles ranking of No. 479 achieved on 20 April 2026 and a doubles ranking of No. 619 achieved on 23 February 2026.

Berkieta reached an ITF junior combined ranking of world No. 6 on 8 July 2024.

== Early life and background ==
Berkieta was born in Warsaw to Kamil Berkieta and Magdalena Sawicka. His mother is a tennis coach who played the sport until the age of 16, when she had to retire due to injury.

While volunteering as a ball boy at the 2013 Davis Cup World Group play-offs, Berkieta was hit in the stomach by a 230 km/h (140 mph) serve from Nick Kyrgios and had to exit the court.

He is currently coached by Piotr Sierzputowski, the former coach of Iga Świątek, and trains at the Legia Tennis Centre in Warsaw.

== Junior career ==
In January 2022, Berkieta reached the semifinal of the J4 Eintracht Frankfurt event. The following month, he won his maiden ITF Junior title at the J5 DeSki Warsaw Cup. He also won the doubles title with Piotr Czaczkowski. In March, he won back-to-back titles at the J4 Ādaži Open and the J4 Aphrodite Cup in Nicosia. He later reached the final of the J3 Croatia Open in Čakovec and the J3 Charlie Berszakiewicz Memorial tournament in Kraków. He won his final title of the year in September, at the J2 Al-Solaimaneyah Junior Tournament in Cairo.

Berkieta made his junior Grand Slam debut at the 2023 Australian Open, where he reached the semifinal in singles. He lost in the first round of the French Open, but reached the quarterfinal at Wimbledon. In October 2023, he won the J200 event in Vigo and reached the final of the J300 event in Sanxenxo.

At the 2024 Australian Open, he recorded a 233 km/h (145 mph) serve, the fastest serve of the tournament. Unseeded at the 2024 French Open, he reached his first junior Grand Slam final with wins over Izan Almazán Valiente, sixth seed Hayden Jones, qualifier Charlie Robertson, wildcard Moïse Kouamé, and Lorenzo Carboni. He lost in the final to fifth seed Kaylan Bigun.

== Professional career ==
In August 2022, Berkieta made his ITF Men's World Tennis Tour main draw debut as a wildcard at the M25 Poznań. In August 2023, he made his ATP Challenger Tour main draw debut as a wildcard at the Kozerki Open.

Berkieta represented Poland in the 2023 Davis Cup World Group II, where he recorded a win over Xavier Lawrence of Barbados.

== ITF World Tennis Tour finals ==
=== Singles: 4 (1 title, 3 runner-ups) ===
Legend ITF WTT (1–3)	Finals by surface Hard (0–1) Clay (1–2)

Result	W–L	Date	Tournament	Tier	Surface	Opponent	Score
Loss	0–1	Sep 2024	M15 Sharm El Sheikh, Egypt	WTT	Hard	Evgenii Tiurnev	5–7, 1–6
Win	1–1	Jun 2025	M15 Messina, Italy	WTT	Clay	(Italy) Lorenzo Sciahbasi	6–4, 6–4
Loss	1–2	Jul 2025	M15 Łódź, Poland	WTT	Clay	(Finland) Eero Vasa	2–6, 2–6
Loss	1–3	Jul 2025	M25 Koszalin, Poland	WTT	Clay	(Poland) Maks Kaśnikowski	1–6, 6–4, 4–6

=== Doubles: 5 (2 titles, 3 runner-ups) ===
Legend ITF WTT (2–3)	Finals by surface Hard (0–1) Clay (2–2)

Result	W–L	Date	Tournament	Tier	Surface	Partner	Opponents	Score
Loss	0–1	Aug 2024	M15 Szczawno-Zdrój, Poland	WTT	Clay	(Poland) Mateusz Lange	(Poland) Filip Pieczonka (Poland) Szymon Kielan	4–6, 4–6
Loss	0–2	Jan 2025	M15 Oslo, Norway	WTT	Hard	(Germany) Marc Majdandzic	(Sweden) Erik Grevelius (Sweden) Adam Heinonen	4–6, 3–6
Loss	0–3	May 2025	M15 Brčko, Bosnia and Herzegovina	WTT	Clay	(Italy) Gabriele Maria Noce	(Ukraine) Viacheslav Bielinskyi (Poland) Jasza Szajrych	6–1, 3–6, [5–10]
Win	1–3	Jun 2025	M15 Messina, Italy	WTT	Clay	(France) Théo Papamalamis	(Monaco) Rocco Piatti (Italy) Lorenzo Sciahbasi	6–4, 6–3
Win	2–3	Jun 2025	M15 Grodzisk Mazowiecki, Poland	WTT	Clay	(Poland) Mateusz Lange	(Czech Republic) Matyáš Černý (Czech Republic) Jonáš Kučera	walkover

== Junior Grand Slam finals ==
=== Singles: 1 (runner-up) ===
Result	Year	Tournament	Surface	Opponent	Score
Loss	2024	French Open	Clay	(United States) Kaylan Bigun	6–4, 3–6, 3–6
