= Jagger Leach =

American tennis player (born 2007)

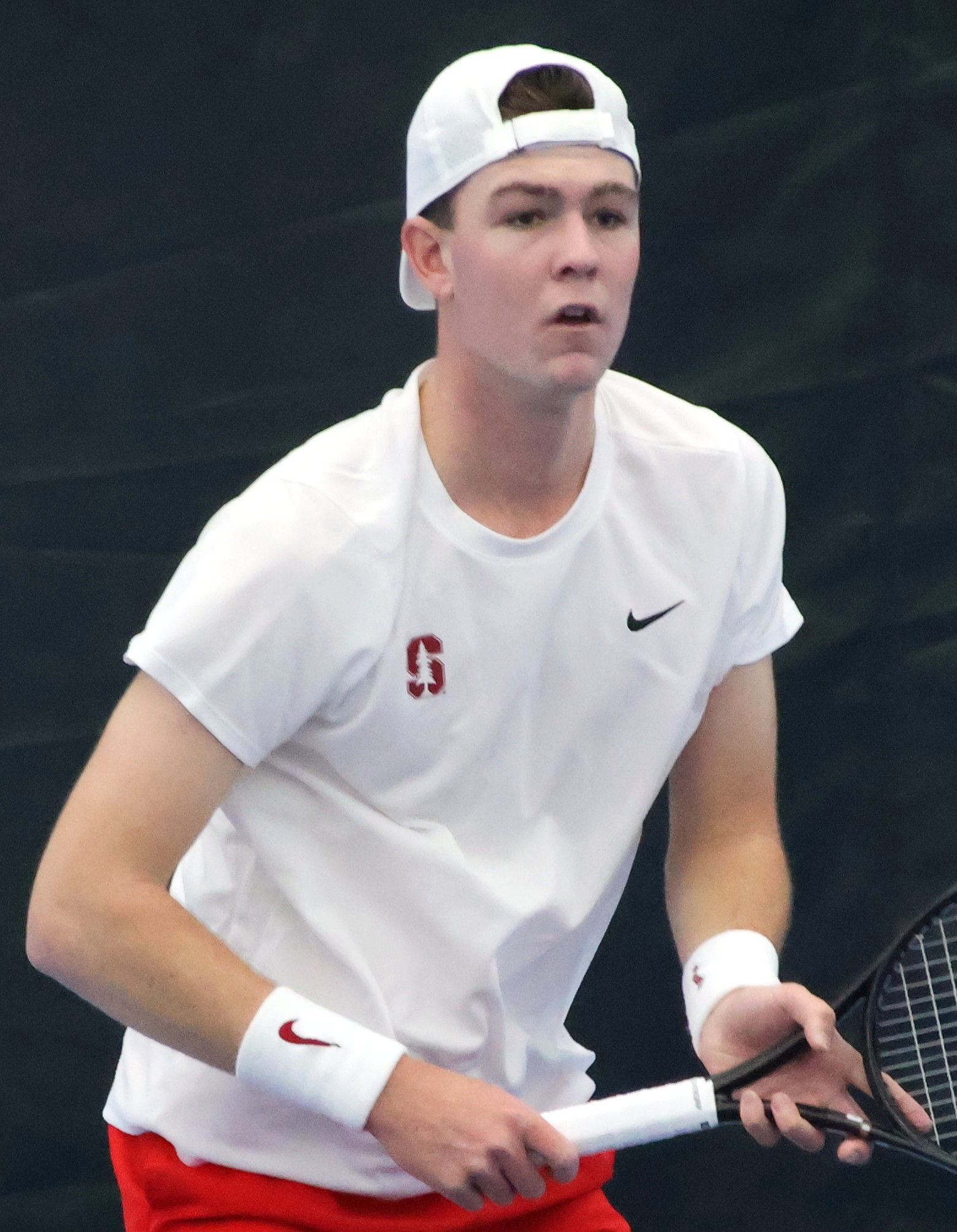
- Leach with Stanford in 2026
- Country (sports): United States
- Born: 10 June 2007 (age 19)
- College: Stanford
- Prize money: $2,791

Singles
- Highest ranking: No. 1,242 (June 23, 2025)
- Current ranking: No. 1,353 (February 16, 2026)

Grand Slam singles results
- Australian Open Junior: SF (2025)
- French Open Junior: 3R (2025)
- Wimbledon Junior: QF (2024)
- US Open Junior: 2R (2023)

Doubles
- Highest ranking: No. 1,576 (July 21, 2025)
- Current ranking: No. 1,725 (February 16, 2026)

Grand Slam doubles results
- Australian Open Junior: SF (2024, 2025)
- French Open Junior: SF (2025)
- Wimbledon Junior: F (2025)
- US Open Junior: 1R (2024)
- Last updated on: February 16, 2026.

Jagger Leach (born June 10, 2007) is an American tennis player.

== Early life ==
Born in June 2007, he started playing tennis at a young age. In August 2020, Leach was in an automobile accident and had to be airlifted to a hospital for emergency surgery which took five hours and he spent over a week in hospital in Hawaii. Leach was not able to bear weight for five months. In 2021, he had surgery on both his legs for growth plate issues and to remove a plate and screws, keeping him away from the sport for another three months. His family moved from Laguna Beach to Sarasota, Florida where he attended the IMG Academy.

In July 2025, he decommitted from Texas Christian University to Stanford University.

== Career ==
=== 2023 ===
He won three ITF junior events in New Zealand at the start of 2023. With Darwin Blanch and Maxwell Exsted, he was part of the American team which finished third at the 2023 Junior Davis Cup. During the 2023 season he achieved a streak of 17 consecutive victories.

=== 2024 ===
In January 2024, he won his first match at a grand slam junior event at the 2024 Australian Open. In the second round he faced home wildcard Hayden Jones. Although he lost to Jones, he reached the semifinals of the Boys doubles competition alongside Kaylan Bigun. He also paired with Bigun at the Boys' doubles at the 2024 French Open. Competing at the 2024 Wimbledon Championships, he reached the quarter finals of the boys singles and teamed up again with Kaylan Bigun in the boys doubles where they reached the semi finals.

=== 2025 ===
He reached the semi-final of the boys' singles at the 2025 Australian Open following wins over Flynn Thomas and William Rejchtman Vinciguerra. In the semi-final he lost in three sets to compatriot Benjamin Willwerth. Playing alongside Brit Oliver Bonding, he also reached the semi-final of the boys' doubles at the Championships. Alongside Bonding he reached the final of the Boys' doubles at the 2025 Wimbledon Championships with a semi-final win over Dutch pair Mees Rottgering and Hidde Schoenmakers.

=== 2026 ===
Whilst at Stanford University, Leach played doubles alongside Nicholas Godsick, whose mother Mary Joe Fernandez formed a professional doubles partnership with his mother.

== Personal life ==
He is the son of Lindsay Davenport and her husband Jon Leach. He has three sisters. His uncle is former number one ATP ranked doubles player Rick Leach and his grandfather was former USC tennis coach Dick Leach.

== Junior Grand Slam finals ==
=== Doubles: 0 (1) ===
Result	Year	Tournament	Surface	Partner	Opponents	Score
Loss	2025	Wimbledon Championships	Grass	(United Kingdom) Oliver Bonding	(Poland) Alan Ważny (Finland) Oskari Paldanius	7-5, 6-7^{(6-8)}, [5-10]
