= 2024 French Open – Mixed doubles =

Mixed doubles
- 2024 French Open

Final
- Champions: (Germany) Laura Siegemund (France) Édouard Roger-Vasselin
- Runners-up: (United States) Desirae Krawczyk (United Kingdom) Neal Skupski
- Score: 6–4, 7–5

Details
- Draw: 32
- Seeds: 8

Events
Singles	men	women		boys	girls
Doubles	men	women	mixed	boys	girls
WC Singles	men	women	quad	boys	girls
WC Doubles	men	women	quad	boys	girls
- French Open

Laura Siegemund and Édouard Roger-Vasselin defeated Desirae Krawczyk and Neal Skupski in the final, 6–4, 7–5 to win the mixed doubles tennis title at the 2024 French Open. It was the second major mixed doubles title for Siegemund and the first for Roger-Vasselin. Roger-Vasselin became the first Frenchman to win the mixed doubles event since Fabrice Santoro in 2005.

Miyu Kato and Tim Pütz were the defending champions, but lost in the quarterfinals to Ulrikke Eikeri and Máximo González.

Mate Pavić was vying to complete a career Grand Slam in mixed doubles, but withdrew from the second round.

== Seeds ==
1. (Australia) Ellen Perez / (Australia) Matthew Ebden (quarterfinals)
2. (Germany) Laura Siegemund / (France) Édouard Roger-Vasselin (champions)
3. (Netherlands) Demi Schuurs / (Netherlands) Wesley Koolhof (withdrew)
4. (United States) Desirae Krawczyk / (United Kingdom) Neal Skupski (final)
5. Vera Zvonareva / (Belgium) Sander Gillé (first round)
6. (New Zealand) Erin Routliffe / (New Zealand) Michael Venus (quarterfinals)
7. (Chinese Taipei) Hsieh Su-wei / (Poland) Jan Zieliński (semifinals)
8. (United States) Bethanie Mattek-Sands / (United States) Austin Krajicek (first round)

== Draw ==
Key

- Q = Qualifier
- WC = Wild card
- LL = Lucky loser
- Alt = Alternate
- ITF = ITF entry
- PR = Protected ranking
- SR = Special ranking
- SE = Special exempt
- JE = Junior exempt
- JR = Junior Accelerator Programme entrant
- CO = College Accelerator Programme entrant
- NG = Next Gen Accelerator Program entrant
- w/o = Walkover
- r = Retired
- d = Defaulted

=== Finals ===
Semifinals
7	(Chinese Taipei) Hsieh Su-wei (Poland) Jan Zieliński	1	7^{7}	[4]
4	(United States) Desirae Krawczyk (United Kingdom) Neal Skupski	6	6^{2}	[10]
(Norway) Ulrikke Eikeri (Argentina) Máximo González	7^{7}	2	[7]
2	(Germany) Laura Siegemund (France) Édouard Roger-Vasselin	6^{2}	6	[10]

Final
4	(United States) Desirae Krawczyk (United Kingdom) Neal Skupski	4	5
2	(Germany) Laura Siegemund (France) Édouard Roger-Vasselin	6	7

=== Top half ===
First round
1	(Australia) E Perez (Australia) M Ebden	6	6
WC	(France) T Andrianjafitrimo (France) U Humbert	2	4
(Ukraine) L Kichenok (Croatia) M Pavić	6	5	[10]
(Spain) C Bucșa (Argentina) A Molteni	4	7	[8]
V Kudermetova (India) R Bopanna	2	2
L Samsonova (Italy) A Vavassori	6	6
(Czech Republic) K Siniaková (Czech Republic) T Macháč	2	6^{3}
7	(Chinese Taipei) S-w Hsieh (Poland) J Zieliński	6	7^{7}
4	(United States) D Krawczyk (United Kingdom) N Skupski	7	6
Alt	(Japan) S Aoyama (Ecuador) G Escobar	5	1
WC	(France) F Ferro (France) P-H Herbert	2	4
(United Kingdom) H Watson (United Kingdom) J Salisbury	6	6
WC	(France) C Paquet (France) G Barrère	3	6	[3]
Alt	(United States) A Muhammad (Uruguay) A Behar	6	3	[10]
PR	(China) S Zhang (El Salvador) M Arévalo	6	6^{6}	[10]
8	(United States) B Mattek-Sands (United States) A Krajicek	4	7^{8}	[6]

Second round
1	(Australia) E Perez (Australia) M Ebden	w/o
(Ukraine) L Kichenok (Croatia) M Pavić
L Samsonova (Italy) A Vavassori	0	3
7	(Chinese Taipei) S-w Hsieh (Poland) J Zieliński	6	6
4	(United States) D Krawczyk (United Kingdom) N Skupski	6	5	[10]
(United Kingdom) H Watson (United Kingdom) J Salisbury	1	7	[7]
Alt	(United States) A Muhammad (Uruguay) A Behar	6	5	[8]
PR	(China) S Zhang (El Salvador) M Arévalo	4	7	[10]

Quarterfinals
1	(Australia) E Perez (Australia) M Ebden	3	4
7	(Chinese Taipei) S-w Hsieh (Poland) J Zieliński	6	6
4	(United States) D Krawczyk (United Kingdom) N Skupski	7^{8}	6
PR	(China) S Zhang (El Salvador) M Arévalo	6^{6}	4

Semifinals
7	(Chinese Taipei) S-w Hsieh (Poland) J Zieliński	1	7^{7}	[4]
4	(United States) D Krawczyk (United Kingdom) N Skupski	6	6^{2}	[10]

=== Bottom half ===
First round
5	V Zvonareva (Belgium) S Gillé	1	4
(United States) N Melichar-Martinez (Australia) J Peers	6	6
WC	(France) E Lechemia (France) A Olivetti	4	4
(Japan) M Kato (Germany) T Pütz	6	6
(Czech Republic) B Krejčíková (Belgium) J Vliegen	6	4	[10]
(Croatia) D Vekić (Croatia) I Dodig	4	6	[2]
(Norway) U Eikeri (Argentina) M González	7	1	[10]
Alt	(Indonesia) A Sutjiadi (United States) J Withrow	5	6	[7]
6	(New Zealand) E Routliffe (New Zealand) M Venus	6	6
(Chinese Taipei) H-c Chan (Monaco) H Nys	4	3
WC	(France) D Parry (France) H Mayot	3	5
WC	(France) C Burel (France) H Gaston	6	7
(Japan) E Shibahara (United States) N Lammons	w/o
WC	(Spain) P Badosa (Greece) S Tsitsipas
WC	(France) A Cornet (France) N Mahut	1	3
2	(Germany) L Siegemund (France) É Roger-Vasselin	6	6

Second round
(United States) N Melichar-Martinez (Australia) J Peers	6^{3}	6^{3}
(Japan) M Kato (Germany) T Pütz	7^{7}	7^{7}
(Czech Republic) B Krejčíková (Belgium) J Vliegen
(Norway) U Eikeri (Argentina) M González	w/o
6	(New Zealand) E Routliffe (New Zealand) M Venus	6	6
WC	(France) C Burel (France) H Gaston	4	2
(Japan) E Shibahara (United States) N Lammons	6	5	[6]
2	(Germany) L Siegemund (France) É Roger-Vasselin	3	7	[10]

Quarterfinals
(Japan) M Kato (Germany) T Pütz	6	5	[8]
(Norway) U Eikeri (Argentina) M González	1	7	[10]
6	(New Zealand) E Routliffe (New Zealand) M Venus	6	4	[7]
2	(Germany) L Siegemund (France) É Roger-Vasselin	4	6	[10]

Semifinals
(Norway) U Eikeri (Argentina) M González	7^{7}	2	[7]
2	(Germany) L Siegemund (France) É Roger-Vasselin	6^{2}	6	[10]

== Other entry information ==
=== Wild cards ===
- (France) Tessah Andrianjafitrimo / (France) Ugo Humbert
- (Spain) Paula Badosa / (Greece) Stefanos Tsitsipas
- (France) Clara Burel / (France) Hugo Gaston
- (France) Alizé Cornet / (France) Nicolas Mahut
- (France) Fiona Ferro / (France) Pierre-Hugues Herbert
- (France) Elixane Lechemia / (France) Albano Olivetti
- (France) Chloé Paquet / (France) Grégoire Barrère
- (France) Diane Parry / (France) Harold Mayot

=== Alternates ===
- (Japan) Shuko Aoyama / (Ecuador) Gonzalo Escobar
- (United States) Asia Muhammad / (Uruguay) Ariel Behar
- (Indonesia) Aldila Sutjiadi / (United States) Jackson Withrow

=== Withdrawals ===
- (Mexico) Giuliana Olmos / (Mexico) Santiago González → replaced by (United States) Asia Muhammad / (Uruguay) Ariel Behar
- (Netherlands) Demi Schuurs / (Netherlands) Wesley Koolhof → replaced by (Indonesia) Aldila Sutjiadi / (United States) Jackson Withrow
- (Brazil) Luisa Stefani / (Brazil) Rafael Matos → replaced by (Japan) Shuko Aoyama / (Ecuador) Gonzalo Escobar
