= 2024 French Open – Wheelchair women's doubles =

Wheelchair women's doubles
- 2024 French Open

Final
- Champions: (Netherlands) Diede de Groot (Netherlands) Aniek van Koot
- Runners-up: (Japan) Yui Kamiji (South Africa) Kgothatso Montjane
- Score: 6–7^{(6–8)}, 7–6^{(7–2)}, [10–4]

Events
Singles	men	women		boys	girls
Doubles	men	women	mixed	boys	girls
WC Singles	men	women	quad	boys	girls
WC Doubles	men	women	quad	boys	girls
- French Open

Diede de Groot and Aniek van Koot defeated defending champions Yui Kamiji and Kgothatso Montjane in the final, 6–7^{(6–8)}, 7–6^{(7–2)}, [10–4] to win the women's doubles wheelchair tennis title at the 2024 French Open.

== Seeds ==
1. (Japan) Yui Kamiji / (South Africa) Kgothatso Montjane (final)
2. (Netherlands) Diede de Groot / (Netherlands) Aniek van Koot (champions)

== Draw ==
Key

- Q = Qualifier
- WC = Wild card
- LL = Lucky loser
- Alt = Alternate
- ITF = ITF entry
- PR = Protected ranking
- SR = Special ranking
- SE = Special exempt
- JE = Junior exempt
- JR = Junior Accelerator Programme entrant
- CO = College Accelerator Programme entrant
- NG = Next Gen Accelerator Program entrant
- w/o = Walkover
- r = Retired
- d = Defaulted

=== Finals ===
Quarterfinals
1	(Japan) Yui Kamiji (South Africa) Kgothatso Montjane	6	7
(Colombia) Angélica Bernal (United Kingdom) Lucy Shuker	3	5
(United States) Dana Mathewson (Japan) Manami Tanaka	5	6	[10]
(France) Pauline Déroulède (France) Emmanuelle Mörch	7	1	[3]
(China) Li Xiaohui (China) Zhu Zhenzhen	6	6
(Netherlands) Lizzy de Greef (Netherlands) Jiske Griffioen	0	4
(Japan) Momoko Ohtani (China) Wang Ziying	2	3
2	(Netherlands) Diede de Groot (Netherlands) Aniek van Koot	6	6

Semifinals
1	(Japan) Yui Kamiji (South Africa) Kgothatso Montjane	6	6
(United States) Dana Mathewson (Japan) Manami Tanaka	3	2
(China) Li Xiaohui (China) Zhu Zhenzhen	6^{1}	4
2	(Netherlands) Diede de Groot (Netherlands) Aniek van Koot	7^{7}	6

Final
1	(Japan) Yui Kamiji (South Africa) Kgothatso Montjane	7^{8}	6^{2}	[4]
2	(Netherlands) Diede de Groot (Netherlands) Aniek van Koot	6^{6}	7^{7}	[10]
