= 2024 French Open – Wheelchair quad doubles =

Wheelchair quad doubles
- 2024 French Open

Final
- Champions: (Netherlands) Sam Schröder (Netherlands) Niels Vink
- Runners-up: (United Kingdom) Andy Lapthorne (Israel) Guy Sasson
- Score: 7–6^{(11–9)}, 6–1

Events
Singles	men	women		boys	girls
Doubles	men	women	mixed	boys	girls
WC Singles	men	women	quad	boys	girls
WC Doubles	men	women	quad	boys	girls
- French Open

Sam Schröder and Niels Vink defeated defending champion Andy Lapthorne and his partner Guy Sasson in the final, 7–6^{(11–9)}, 6–1 to win the quad doubles wheelchair tennis title at the 2024 French Open.

Lapthorne and Donald Ramphadi were the reigning champions, but chose not to defend the title together. Ramphadi partnered Heath Davidson, but lost in the semifinals to Schröder and Vink.

== Seeds ==
1. (Netherlands) Sam Schröder / (Netherlands) Niels Vink (champions)
2. (United Kingdom) Andy Lapthorne / (Israel) Guy Sasson (final)

== Draw ==
Key

- Q = Qualifier
- WC = Wild card
- LL = Lucky loser
- Alt = Alternate
- ITF = ITF entry
- PR = Protected ranking
- SR = Special ranking
- SE = Special exempt
- JE = Junior exempt
- JR = Junior Accelerator Programme entrant
- CO = College Accelerator Programme entrant
- NG = Next Gen Accelerator Program entrant
- w/o = Walkover
- r = Retired
- d = Defaulted

=== Finals ===
Semifinals
1	(Netherlands) Sam Schröder (Netherlands) Niels Vink	6	6
(Australia) Heath Davidson (South Africa) Donald Ramphadi	1	3
(Canada) Robert Shaw (United States) David Wagner	2	6	[2]
2	(United Kingdom) Andy Lapthorne (Israel) Guy Sasson	6	3	[10]

Final
1	(Netherlands) Sam Schröder (Netherlands) Niels Vink	7^{11}	6
2	(United Kingdom) Andy Lapthorne (Israel) Guy Sasson	6^{9}	1
