= 2024 French Open – Men's doubles =

Men's doubles
- 2024 French Open

Final
- Champions: (El Salvador) Marcelo Arévalo (Croatia) Mate Pavić
- Runners-up: (Italy) Simone Bolelli (Italy) Andrea Vavassori
- Score: 7–5, 6–3

Events
Singles	men	women		boys	girls
Doubles	men	women	mixed	boys	girls
WC Singles	men	women	quad	boys	girls
WC Doubles	men	women	quad	boys	girls
- French Open

Marcelo Arévalo and Mate Pavić defeated Simone Bolelli and Andrea Vavassori in the final, 7–5, 6–3 to win the men's doubles tennis title at the 2024 French Open. It was Arévalo's second major men's doubles title and Pavić's fourth. Pavić completed the career Golden Slam in men's doubles with the win, having previously won the other three majors and the Olympic gold medal.

Ivan Dodig and Austin Krajicek were the defending champions, but lost in the second round to Petros and Stefanos Tsitsipas.

Matthew Ebden regained the ATP No. 1 doubles ranking after the pair of Marcel Granollers and Horacio Zeballos lost in the semifinals. Joe Salisbury and Wesley Koolhof were also in contention for the top ranking at the beginning of the tournament.

== Seeds ==
1. (Spain) Marcel Granollers / (Argentina) Horacio Zeballos (semifinals)
2. (India) Rohan Bopanna / (Australia) Matthew Ebden (semifinals)
3. (United States) Rajeev Ram / (United Kingdom) Joe Salisbury (quarterfinals)
4. (Croatia) Ivan Dodig / (United States) Austin Krajicek (second round)
5. (Mexico) Santiago González / (France) Édouard Roger-Vasselin (first round)
6. (Germany) Kevin Krawietz / (Germany) Tim Pütz (third round)
7. (Netherlands) Wesley Koolhof / (Croatia) Nikola Mektić (second round)
8. (Argentina) Máximo González / (Argentina) Andrés Molteni (third round)
9. (El Salvador) Marcelo Arévalo / (Croatia) Mate Pavić (champions)
10. (Belgium) Sander Gillé / (Belgium) Joran Vliegen (quarterfinals)
11. (Italy) Simone Bolelli / (Italy) Andrea Vavassori (final)
12. (Germany) Andreas Mies / (United Kingdom) Neal Skupski (first round)
13. (United Kingdom) Jamie Murray / (New Zealand) Michael Venus (second round)
14. (United States) Nathaniel Lammons / (United States) Jackson Withrow (first round)
15. (Monaco) Hugo Nys / (Poland) Jan Zieliński (third round)
16. (France) Sadio Doumbia / (France) Fabien Reboul (first round)

Click on the seed number of a player to go to their draw section.

== Draw ==
Key

- Q = Qualifier
- WC = Wild card
- LL = Lucky loser
- Alt = Alternate
- ITF = ITF entry
- PR = Protected ranking
- SR = Special ranking
- SE = Special exempt
- JE = Junior exempt
- JR = Junior Accelerator Programme entrant
- CO = College Accelerator Programme entrant
- NG = Next Gen Accelerator Program entrant
- w/o = Walkover
- r = Retired
- d = Defaulted

=== Finals ===
Quarterfinals
1	(Spain) Marcel Granollers (Argentina) Horacio Zeballos	6	6
(Czech Republic) Tomáš Macháč (China) Zhang Zhizhen	4	1
(Greece) Petros Tsitsipas (Greece) Stefanos Tsitsipas	5	4
9	(El Salvador) Marcelo Arévalo (Croatia) Mate Pavić	7	6
11	(Italy) Simone Bolelli (Italy) Andrea Vavassori	1	6	6
3	(United States) Rajeev Ram (United Kingdom) Joe Salisbury	6	3	4
10	(Belgium) Sander Gillé (Belgium) Joran Vliegen	6^{3}	7	1
2	(India) Rohan Bopanna (Australia) Matthew Ebden	7^{7}	5	6

Semifinals
1	(Spain) Marcel Granollers (Argentina) Horacio Zeballos	6	4	5
9	(El Salvador) Marcelo Arévalo (Croatia) Mate Pavić	3	6	7
11	(Italy) Simone Bolelli (Italy) Andrea Vavassori	7	2	6
2	(India) Rohan Bopanna (Australia) Matthew Ebden	5	6	2

Final
9	(El Salvador) Marcelo Arévalo (Croatia) Mate Pavić	7	6
11	(Italy) Simone Bolelli (Italy) Andrea Vavassori	5	3

=== Top half ===
==== Section 1 ====
First round
1	(Spain) M Granollers (Argentina) H Zeballos	6	6
PR	(France) A Mannarino (France) F Martin	2	2
WC	(France) Q Halys (France) N Mahut	4	4
(Austria) A Erler (Austria) L Miedler	6	6
Alt	(United States) M Giron (France) C Lestienne	5	1
(United States) C Eubanks (United States) E King	7	6
(Romania) VV Cornea (Italy) L Darderi	7^{9}	5	4
15	(Monaco) H Nys (Poland) J Zieliński	6^{7}	7	6
12	(Germany) A Mies (United Kingdom) N Skupski	6	4	3
(Czech Republic) T Macháč (China) Z Zhang	4	6	6
WC	(France) A Müller (France) L Sanchez	2	4
(Netherlands) R Haase (Netherlands) B van de Zandschulp	6	6
(Kazakhstan) A Bublik (Kazakhstan) A Shevchenko	6	1	6
(Serbia) M Kecmanović (Serbia) D Lajović	4	6	3
(United Kingdom) L Glasspool (Netherlands) J-J Rojer	6^{3}	3
8	(Argentina) M González (Argentina) A Molteni	7^{7}	6

Second round
1	(Spain) M Granollers (Argentina) H Zeballos	7^{7}	6
(Austria) A Erler (Austria) L Miedler	6^{3}	2
(United States) C Eubanks (United States) E King	6	4	5
15	(Monaco) H Nys (Poland) J Zieliński	2	6	7
(Czech Republic) T Macháč (China) Z Zhang	7	6
(Netherlands) R Haase (Netherlands) B van de Zandschulp	5	2
(Kazakhstan) A Bublik (Kazakhstan) A Shevchenko
8	(Argentina) M González (Argentina) A Molteni	w/o

Third round
1	(Spain) M Granollers (Argentina) H Zeballos	6	6
15	(Monaco) H Nys (Poland) J Zieliński	2	1
(Czech Republic) T Macháč (China) Z Zhang	6	7
8	(Argentina) M González (Argentina) A Molteni	3	5

Quarterfinals
1	(Spain) M Granollers (Argentina) H Zeballos	6	6
(Czech Republic) T Macháč (China) Z Zhang	4	1

==== Section 2 ====
First round
4	(Croatia) I Dodig (United States) A Krajicek	6	5	6
(United Kingdom) J Cash (United States) R Galloway	4	7	3
(Greece) Pe Tsitsipas (Greece) S Tsitsipas	7^{11}	6
(Ukraine) D Molchanov (Australia) J-P Smith	6^{9}	4
(Colombia) N Barrientos (Portugal) F Cabral	6^{5}	4
(Argentina) G Andreozzi (Australia) R Hijikata	7^{7}	6
Alt	(France) M Guinard (France) G Jacq	7^{7}	6
14	(United States) N Lammons (United States) J Withrow	6^{5}	4
9	(El Salvador) M Arévalo (Croatia) M Pavić	6	6
(Spain) R Carballés Baena (Argentina) M Navone	2	2
PR	(Jamaica) D Brown (United States) F Tiafoe	6^{3}	3
PR	(New Zealand) M Daniell (United States) M McDonald	7^{7}	6
(Italy) F Cobolli (Colombia) C Rodríguez	2	6	6^{4}
(Germany) Y Hanfmann (Germany) D Koepfer	6	2	7^{10}
(Ecuador) D Hidalgo (Chile) A Tabilo	1	4
6	(Germany) K Krawietz (Germany) T Pütz	6	6

Second round
4	(Croatia) I Dodig (United States) A Krajicek	6	5	3
(Greece) Pe Tsitsipas (Greece) S Tsitsipas	4	7	6
(Argentina) G Andreozzi (Australia) R Hijikata	2	6^{11}
Alt	(France) M Guinard (France) G Jacq	6	7^{13}
9	(El Salvador) M Arévalo (Croatia) M Pavić	1
PR	(New Zealand) M Daniell (United States) M McDonald	0^{r}
(Germany) Y Hanfmann (Germany) D Koepfer
6	(Germany) K Krawietz (Germany) T Pütz	w/o

Third round
(Greece) Pe Tsitsipas (Greece) S Tsitsipas	7^{7}	6
Alt	(France) M Guinard (France) G Jacq	6^{2}	2
9	(El Salvador) M Arévalo (Croatia) M Pavić	7^{7}	7^{7}
6	(Germany) K Krawietz (Germany) T Pütz	6^{3}	6^{5}

Quarterfinals
(Greece) Pe Tsitsipas (Greece) S Tsitsipas	5	4
9	(El Salvador) M Arévalo (Croatia) M Pavić	7	6

=== Bottom half ===
==== Section 3 ====
First round
7	(Netherlands) W Koolhof (Croatia) N Mektić	6	6^{3}	7
(Netherlands) S Arends (Netherlands) M Middelkoop	4	7^{7}	5
Alt	(Sweden) A Göransson (Netherlands) D Pel	7^{9}	3	4
(Australia) M Purcell (Australia) J Thompson	6^{7}	6	6
(Brazil) R Matos (Brazil) M Melo	7^{7}	4	7^{11}
(Germany) C Frantzen (Germany) H Jebens	6^{4}	6	6^{9}
(Hungary) F Marozsán (Brazil) F Romboli	4	0
11	(Italy) S Bolelli (Italy) A Vavassori	6	6
13	(United Kingdom) J Murray (New Zealand) M Venus	6	6
(Spain) P Martínez (Spain) J Munar	1	2
WC	(France) T Droguet (France) G Mpetshi Perricard	4	2
WC	(France) G Barrère (France) L Pouille	6	6
PR	(Spain) P Carreño Busta (Spain) S Martos Gornés	6^{3}	4
(Ecuador) G Escobar (Kazakhstan) A Nedovyesov	7^{7}	6
(Uruguay) A Behar (Czech Republic) A Pavlásek	3	4
3	(United States) R Ram (United Kingdom) J Salisbury	6	6

Second round
7	(Netherlands) W Koolhof (Croatia) N Mektić	6	4	4
(Australia) M Purcell (Australia) J Thompson	4	6	6
(Brazil) R Matos (Brazil) M Melo	5	5
11	(Italy) S Bolelli (Italy) A Vavassori	7	7
13	(United Kingdom) J Murray (New Zealand) M Venus	4	6^{6}
WC	(France) G Barrère (France) L Pouille	6	7^{8}
(Ecuador) G Escobar (Kazakhstan) A Nedovyesov	4	4
3	(United States) R Ram (United Kingdom) J Salisbury	6	6

Third round
(Australia) M Purcell (Australia) J Thompson	3	4
11	(Italy) S Bolelli (Italy) A Vavassori	6	6
WC	(France) G Barrère (France) L Pouille	3	3
3	(United States) R Ram (United Kingdom) J Salisbury	6	6

Quarterfinals
11	(Italy) S Bolelli (Italy) A Vavassori	1	6	6
3	(United States) R Ram (United Kingdom) J Salisbury	6	3	4

==== Section 4 ====
First round
5	(Mexico) S González (France) É Roger-Vasselin	3	7	4
(Finland) H Heliövaara (United Kingdom) H Patten	6	5	6
(United Kingdom) L Johnson (Tunisia) S Mansouri	6	6
(Monaco) R Arneodo (Austria) S Weissborn	2	4
(Australia) J Peers; R Safiullin	6	7^{7}
(India) Y Bhambri (France) A Olivetti	3	6^{5}
Alt	(Venezuela) LD Martínez (Czech Republic) P Nouza	6^{6}	6	4
10	(Belgium) S Gillé (Belgium) J Vliegen	7^{8}	3	6
16	(France) S Doumbia (France) F Reboul	6	6^{3}	4
WC	(France) D Added (France) T Arribagé	2	7^{7}	6
Alt	(United States) R Stalder (Netherlands) S Verbeek	3	4
Alt	(India) S Balaji (Mexico) MÁ Reyes-Varela	6	6
(Argentina) S Báez (Brazil) T Seyboth Wild	7^{8}	7^{7}
WC	(United Kingdom) D Evans (United Kingdom) A Murray	6^{6}	6^{3}
Alt	(Brazil) O Luz (Brazil) M Zormann	5	6	4
2	(India) R Bopanna (Australia) M Ebden	7	4	6

Second round
(Finland) H Heliövaara (United Kingdom) H Patten	6	7
(United Kingdom) L Johnson (Tunisia) S Mansouri	3	5
(Australia) J Peers; R Safiullin	4	4
10	(Belgium) S Gillé (Belgium) J Vliegen	6	6
WC	(France) D Added (France) T Arribagé	4	6	2
Alt	(India) S Balaji (Mexico) MÁ Reyes-Varela	6	3	6
(Argentina) S Báez (Brazil) T Seyboth Wild
2	(India) R Bopanna (Australia) M Ebden	w/o

Third round
(Finland) H Heliövaara (United Kingdom) H Patten
10	(Belgium) S Gillé (Belgium) J Vliegen	w/o
Alt	(India) S Balaji (Mexico) MÁ Reyes-Varela	7^{7}	3	6^{8}
2	(India) R Bopanna (Australia) M Ebden	6^{2}	6	7^{10}

Quarterfinals
10	(Belgium) S Gillé (Belgium) J Vliegen	6^{3}	7	1
2	(India) R Bopanna (Australia) M Ebden	7^{7}	5	6

== Seeded teams ==
The following are the seeded teams. Seedings are based on ATP rankings as of 20 May 2024.

Country	Player	Country	Player	Rank	Seed
ESP	Marcel Granollers	ARG	Horacio Zeballos	2	1
IND	Rohan Bopanna	AUS	Matthew Ebden	7	2
USA	Rajeev Ram	GBR	Joe Salisbury	11	3
CRO	Ivan Dodig	USA	Austin Krajicek	15	4
MEX	Santiago González	FRA	Édouard Roger-Vasselin	23	5
GER	Kevin Krawietz	GER	Tim Pütz	28	6
NED	Wesley Koolhof	CRO	Nikola Mektić	31	7
ARG	Máximo González	ARG	Andrés Molteni	33	8
ESA	Marcelo Arévalo	CRO	Mate Pavić	36	9
BEL	Sander Gillé	BEL	Joran Vliegen	36	10
ITA	Simone Bolelli	ITA	Andrea Vavassori	41	11
GER	Andreas Mies	GBR	Neal Skupski	50	12
GBR	Jamie Murray	NZL	Michael Venus	51	13
USA	Nathaniel Lammons	USA	Jackson Withrow	55	14
MON	Hugo Nys	POL	Jan Zieliński	59	15
FRA	Sadio Doumbia	FRA	Fabien Reboul	63	16

== Other entry information ==
=== Wildcards ===
- (France) Dan Added / (France) Théo Arribagé
- (France) Grégoire Barrère / (France) Lucas Pouille
- (France) Titouan Droguet / (France) Giovanni Mpetshi Perricard
- (United Kingdom) Dan Evans / (United Kingdom) Andy Murray
- ~~(France) Richard Gasquet / (France) Hugo Gaston~~
- (France) Quentin Halys / (France) Nicolas Mahut
- (France) Alexandre Müller / (France) Luca Sanchez

=== Protected ranking ===
- (Jamaica) Dustin Brown / (United States) Frances Tiafoe
- (Spain) Pablo Carreño Busta / (Spain) Sergio Martos Gornés
- (New Zealand) Marcus Daniell / (United States) Mackenzie McDonald
- ~~(Australia) Thanasi Kokkinakis / (Canada) Denis Shapovalov~~
- (France) Adrian Mannarino / (France) Fabrice Martin

=== Alternates ===
- (India) Sriram Balaji / (Mexico) Miguel Ángel Reyes-Varela
- (United States) Marcos Giron / (France) Constant Lestienne
- (Sweden) André Göransson / (Netherlands) David Pel
- (France) Manuel Guinard / (France) Grégoire Jacq
- (Brazil) Orlando Luz / (Brazil) Marcelo Zormann
- (Venezuela) Luis David Martínez / (Czech Republic) Petr Nouza
- (United States) Reese Stalder / (Netherlands) Sem Verbeek

=== Withdrawals ===
- (Portugal) Nuno Borges / (France) Arthur Rinderknech → replaced by (Venezuela) Luis David Martínez / (Czech Republic) Petr Nouza
- (Argentina) Francisco Cerúndolo / (Argentina) Tomás Martín Etcheverry → replaced by (United States) Reese Stalder / (Netherlands) Sem Verbeek
- (France) Arthur Fils / (France) Luca Van Assche → replaced by (India) Sriram Balaji / (Mexico) Miguel Ángel Reyes-Varela
- (Hungary) Márton Fucsovics / (Finland) Emil Ruusuvuori → replaced by (Brazil) Orlando Luz / (Brazil) Marcelo Zormann
- (France) Richard Gasquet / (France) Hugo Gaston → replaced by (United States) Marcos Giron / (France) Constant Lestienne
- (Netherlands) Tallon Griekspoor / (Netherlands) Bart Stevens → replaced by (Sweden) André Göransson / (Netherlands) David Pel
- (Australia) Thanasi Kokkinakis / (Canada) Denis Shapovalov → replaced by (France) Manuel Guinard / (France) Grégoire Jacq
