= 2024 French Open – Wheelchair men's singles =

Wheelchair men's singles
- 2024 French Open

Final
- Champion: (Japan) Tokito Oda
- Runner-up: (Argentina) Gustavo Fernández
- Score: 7–5, 6–3

Events
Singles	men	women		boys	girls
Doubles	men	women	mixed	boys	girls
WC Singles	men	women	quad	boys	girls
WC Doubles	men	women	quad	boys	girls
- French Open

Defending champion Tokito Oda defeated Gustavo Fernández in the final, 7–5, 6–3 to win the men's singles wheelchair tennis title at the 2024 French Open. It was his second French Open singles title and fourth major singles title overall.

== Seeds ==
1. (United Kingdom) Alfie Hewett (semifinals)
2. (Japan) Tokito Oda (champion)
3. (Argentina) Gustavo Fernández (final)
4. (Spain) Martín de la Puente (first round)

== Draw ==
Key

- Q = Qualifier
- WC = Wild card
- LL = Lucky loser
- Alt = Alternate
- ITF = ITF entry
- PR = Protected ranking
- SR = Special ranking
- SE = Special exempt
- JE = Junior exempt
- JR = Junior Accelerator Programme entrant
- CO = College Accelerator Programme entrant
- NG = Next Gen Accelerator Program entrant
- w/o = Walkover
- r = Retired
- d = Defaulted

=== Finals ===
First round
1	(United Kingdom) Alfie Hewett	6	6
(Belgium) Joachim Gérard	1	3
(United Kingdom) Gordon Reid	7	6
(France) Stéphane Houdet	5	2
3	(Argentina) Gustavo Fernández	6	6
(Japan) Takashi Sanada	1	3
(Netherlands) Maikel Scheffers	6	1	3
(United States) Casey Ratzlaff	4	6	6
WC	(France) Guilhem Laget	4	2
(Chile) Alexander Cataldo	6	6
(Japan) Takuya Miki	7	3	6
4	(Spain) Martín de la Puente	5	6	4
(Netherlands) Tom Egberink	6	6
WC	(France) Frédéric Cattaneo	1	3
(Netherlands) Ruben Spaargaren	6^{7}	2
2	(Japan) Tokito Oda	7^{9}	6

Quarterfinals
1	(United Kingdom) A Hewett	6	6
(United Kingdom) G Reid	0	4
3	(Argentina) G Fernández	6	7
(United States) C Ratzlaff	0	5
(Chile) A Cataldo	4	4
(Japan) T Miki	6	6
(Netherlands) T Egberink	1	4
2	(Japan) T Oda	6	6

Semifinals
1	(United Kingdom) A Hewett	5	7^{7}	2
3	(Argentina) G Fernández	7	6^{1}	6
(Japan) T Miki	1	1
2	(Japan) T Oda	6	6

Final
3	(Argentina) G Fernández	5	3
2	(Japan) T Oda	7	6
