= 2024 French Open – Wheelchair quad singles =

Wheelchair quad singles
- 2024 French Open

Final
- Champion: (Israel) Guy Sasson
- Runner-up: (Netherlands) Sam Schröder
- Score: 6–2, 3–6, 7–6^{(10–7)}

Events
Singles	men	women		boys	girls
Doubles	men	women	mixed	boys	girls
WC Singles	men	women	quad	boys	girls
WC Doubles	men	women	quad	boys	girls
- French Open

Guy Sasson defeated Sam Schröder in the final, 6–2, 3–6, 7–6^{(10–7)} to win the quad singles wheelchair tennis title at the 2024 French Open. It was his first major singles title.

Niels Vink was the two-time defending champion, but lost to Sasson in the semifinals.

== Seeds ==
1. (Netherlands) Niels Vink (semifinals)
2. (Netherlands) Sam Schröder (final)

== Draw ==
Key

- Q = Qualifier
- WC = Wild card
- LL = Lucky loser
- Alt = Alternate
- ITF = ITF entry
- PR = Protected ranking
- SR = Special ranking
- SE = Special exempt
- JE = Junior exempt
- JR = Junior Accelerator Programme entrant
- CO = College Accelerator Programme entrant
- NG = Next Gen Accelerator Program entrant
- w/o = Walkover
- r = Retired
- d = Defaulted

=== Finals ===
Quarterfinals
1	(Netherlands) Niels Vink	6	6
WC	(Canada) Robert Shaw	3	3
(Israel) Guy Sasson	6	6
(Australia) Heath Davidson	0	2
(South Africa) Donald Ramphadi	3	6	6
(United States) David Wagner	6	2	1
(United Kingdom) Andy Lapthorne	1	3
2	(Netherlands) Sam Schröder	6	6

Semifinals
1	(Netherlands) Niels Vink	2	3
(Israel) Guy Sasson	6	6
(South Africa) Donald Ramphadi	1	1
2	(Netherlands) Sam Schröder	6	6

Final
(Israel) Guy Sasson	6	3	7^{10}
2	(Netherlands) Sam Schröder	2	6	6^{7}
