= 2024 French Open – Wheelchair women's singles =

Wheelchair women's singles
- 2024 French Open

Final
- Champion: (Netherlands) Diede de Groot
- Runner-up: (China) Zhu Zhenzhen
- Score: 4–6, 6–2, 6–3

Events
Singles	men	women		boys	girls
Doubles	men	women	mixed	boys	girls
WC Singles	men	women	quad	boys	girls
WC Doubles	men	women	quad	boys	girls
- French Open

Three-time defending champion Diede de Groot defeated Zhu Zhenzhen in the final, 4–6, 6–2, 6–3 to win the women's singles wheelchair tennis title at the 2024 French Open. De Groot completed the quintuple career Grand Slam with the win (becoming the first player to do so in any discipline of tennis), and claimed her 14th consecutive major singles title. It was her record-breaking 22nd wheelchair women's singles major title overall, surpassing Esther Vergeer's record.

== Seeds ==
1. (Netherlands) Diede de Groot (champion)
2. (Japan) Yui Kamiji (quarterfinals)
3. (Netherlands) Jiske Griffioen (first round)
4. (Netherlands) Aniek van Koot (semifinals)

== Draw ==
Key

- Q = Qualifier
- WC = Wild card
- LL = Lucky loser
- Alt = Alternate
- ITF = ITF entry
- PR = Protected ranking
- SR = Special ranking
- SE = Special exempt
- JE = Junior exempt
- JR = Junior Accelerator Programme entrant
- CO = College Accelerator Programme entrant
- NG = Next Gen Accelerator Program entrant
- w/o = Walkover
- r = Retired
- d = Defaulted

=== Finals ===
First round
1	(Netherlands) D de Groot	6	6
(China) X Li	3	4
(China) Z Wang	7^{7}	6
(United Kingdom) L Shuker	6^{4}	0
4	(Netherlands) A van Koot	6	6
WC	(France) P Déroulède	3	1
(Japan) M Tanaka	3	4
(United States) D Mathewson	6	6
(Netherlands) L de Greef	6	6
WC	(France) E Mörch	3	2
(China) Z Zhu	6	7^{7}
3	(Netherlands) J Griffioen	3	6^{5}
(South Africa) K Montjane	3	4
(Japan) M Ohtani	6	6
(Colombia) A Bernal	0	2
2	(Japan) Y Kamiji	6	6

Quarterfinals
1	(Netherlands) D de Groot	6	6
(China) Z Wang	0	3
4	(Netherlands) A van Koot	6	6
(United States) D Mathewson	3	0
(Netherlands) L de Greef	3	3
(China) Z Zhu	6	6
(Japan) M Ohtani	6^{1}	7	6
2	(Japan) Y Kamiji	7^{7}	5	4

Semifinals
1	(Netherlands) D de Groot	6	6
4	(Netherlands) A van Koot	1	4
(China) Z Zhu	6	3	7^{10}
(Japan) M Ohtani	4	6	6^{3}

Final
1	(Netherlands) D de Groot	4	6	6
(China) Z Zhu	6	2	3
