= Théo Papamalamis =

French tennis player (born 2006)

- Country (sports): France
- Born: 9 January 2006 (age 20) Metz, France
- Height: 1.83 m (6 ft 0 in)
- Plays: Right-handed (two-handed backhand)
- College: Texas A&M
- Coach: Alexis Papamalamis
- Prize money: US $75,536

Singles
- Career record: 0–1 (at ATP Tour level, Grand Slam level, and in Davis Cup)
- Career titles: 0
- Highest ranking: No. 537 (16 November 2026)
- Current ranking: No. 537 (16 November 2026)

Grand Slam singles results
- French Open: Q1 (2024)

Doubles
- Career record: 0–0 (at ATP Tour level, Grand Slam level, and in Davis Cup)
- Career titles: 0
- Highest ranking: No. 1,085 (27 October 2025)
- Current ranking: No. 1,369 (16 November 2026)
- Last updated on: 16 November 2026.

Théo Papamalamis (born 9 January 2006 in Metz) is a French professional tennis player. He has a career-high ATP singles ranking of No. 537 achieved on 16 November 2026 and a doubles ranking of No. 1,085, reached on 27 October 2025.

== Junior career ==
Papamalamis had good results on the ITF junior circuit, maintaining a 122–61 singles win-loss record. He reached an ITF junior combined ranking of world No. 11 on 15 July 2024.

== Professional career ==
=== 2024: ATP Tour debut ===
In May, Papamalamis made his major qualifying debut at the 2024 French Open, losing to countryman Grégoire Barrère in the first round.

In November, he made his main draw debut on the ATP Tour as a lucky loser at the 2024 Moselle Open, losing to qualifier Quentin Halys in the first round.

== Personal life ==
Papamalamis plays college tennis at Texas A&M University.

Papamalamis' father, Alexis, was his tennis coach during junior years.

== Performance timeline ==
Key
W	F	SF	QF	#R	RR	Q#	DNQ	A	NH

(W) winner; (F) finalist; (SF) semifinalist; (QF) quarterfinalist; (#R) rounds 4, 3, 2, 1; (RR) round-robin stage; (Q#) qualification round; (DNQ) did not qualify; (A) absent; (NH) not held; (SR) strike rate (events won / competed); (W–L) win–loss record.
To avoid confusion and double counting, these charts are updated at the conclusion of a tournament or when the player's participation has ended.

=== Singles ===
Tournament	2024	2025	2026	SR	W–L	Win %
Grand Slam tournaments
Australian Open	A	A	A	0 / 0	0–0	–
French Open	Q1	A	A	0 / 0	0–0	–
Wimbledon	A	A	A	0 / 0	0–0	–
US Open	A	A	A	0 / 0	0–0	–
Win–loss	0–0	0–0	0–0	0 / 0	0–0	–
ATP Masters 1000
Indian Wells Masters	A	Q1	A	0 / 0	0–0	–
Miami Open	A	A	A	0 / 0	0–0	–
Monte Carlo Masters	A	A	A	0 / 0	0–0	–
Madrid Open	A	A	A	0 / 0	0-0	–
Italian Open	A	A	A	0 / 0	0–0	–
Canadian Open	A	A	A	0 / 0	0–0	–
Cincinnati Masters	A	A	A	0 / 0	0–0	–
Shanghai Masters	A	A	A	0 / 0	0–0	–
Paris Masters	A	A	A	0 / 0	0–0	–
Win–loss	0–0	0–0	0–0	0 / 0	0–0	–

== ITF World Tennis Tour finals ==
=== Singles: 5 (1 title, 4 runner-ups) ===
Legend ITF WTT (1–4)	Finals by surface Hard (0–4) Clay (1–0)

Result	W–L	Date	Tournament	Tier	Surface	Opponent	Score
Loss	0–1	Mar 2024	M15 Poitiers, France	WTT	Hard (i)	(France) Fabien Salle	7–6^{(9–7)}, 4–6, 2–6
Loss	0–2	Sep 2024	M25 Nevers, France	WTT	Hard (i)	(Norway) Viktor Durasovic	2–6, 4–6
Loss	0–3	Jan 2025	M25 Ithaca, US	WTT	Hard	(United States) Patrick Maloney	6–7^{(5–7)}, 4–6
Loss	0–4	Jan 2026	M25 Hazebrouck, France	WTT	Hard (i)	(France) Moïse Kouamé	6–7^{(5–7)}, 1–6
Win	1–4	Jun 2026	M15 Bourg-en-Bresse, France	WTT	Clay	(Cyprus) Melios Efstathiou	7–5, 6–3

=== Doubles: 2 (1 title, 1 runner-up) ===
Legend ITF WTT (1–1)

Result	W–L	Date	Tournament	Tier	Surface	Partner	Opponents	Score
Loss	0–1	Jun 2025	M15 Ljubljana, Slovenia	WTT	Clay	(Ukraine) Glib Sekachov	(Slovenia) Jan Kupčič (Slovenia) Žiga Šeško	3–6, 3–6
Win	1–1	Jun 2025	M15 Messina, Italy	WTT	Clay	(Poland) Tomasz Berkieta	(Monaco) Rocco Piatti (Italy) Lorenzo Sciahbasi	6–4, 6–3
