= 2024 French Open – Wheelchair men's doubles =

Wheelchair men's doubles
- 2024 French Open

Final
- Champions: (United Kingdom) Alfie Hewett (United Kingdom) Gordon Reid
- Runners-up: (Japan) Takuya Miki (Japan) Tokito Oda
- Score: 6–1, 6–4

Events
Singles	men	women		boys	girls
Doubles	men	women	mixed	boys	girls
WC Singles	men	women	quad	boys	girls
WC Doubles	men	women	quad	boys	girls
- French Open

Four-time defending champions Alfie Hewett and Gordon Reid defeated Takuya Miki and Tokito Oda in the final, 6–1, 6–4 to win the men's doubles wheelchair tennis title at the 2024 French Open.

== Seeds ==
1. (United Kingdom) Alfie Hewett / (United Kingdom) Gordon Reid (champions)
2. (Japan) Takuya Miki / (Japan) Tokito Oda (final)

== Draw ==
Key

- Q = Qualifier
- WC = Wild card
- LL = Lucky loser
- Alt = Alternate
- ITF = ITF entry
- PR = Protected ranking
- SR = Special ranking
- SE = Special exempt
- JE = Junior exempt
- JR = Junior Accelerator Programme entrant
- CO = College Accelerator Programme entrant
- NG = Next Gen Accelerator Program entrant
- w/o = Walkover
- r = Retired
- d = Defaulted

=== Finals ===
Quarterfinals
1	(United Kingdom) Alfie Hewett (United Kingdom) Gordon Reid	6	6
(Netherlands) Tom Egberink (Netherlands) Maikel Scheffers	2	0
(Argentina) Gustavo Fernández (France) Stéphane Houdet	6	7
(Japan) Takashi Sanada (Netherlands) Ruben Spaargaren	4	5
(France) Frédéric Cattaneo (France) Guilhem Laget	4	6	[10]
(Chile) Alexander Cataldo (United States) Casey Ratzlaff	6	2	[8]
(Spain) Martín de la Puente (Belgium) Joachim Gérard	1	6	[5]
2	(Japan) Takuya Miki (Japan) Tokito Oda	6	4	[10]

Semifinals
1	(United Kingdom) Alfie Hewett (United Kingdom) Gordon Reid	3	6	[10]
(Argentina) Gustavo Fernández (France) Stéphane Houdet	6	2	[8]
(France) Frédéric Cattaneo (France) Guilhem Laget	1	1
2	(Japan) Takuya Miki (Japan) Tokito Oda	6	6

Final
1	(United Kingdom) Alfie Hewett (United Kingdom) Gordon Reid	6	6
2	(Japan) Takuya Miki (Japan) Tokito Oda	1	4
