= 2024 French Open – Girls' singles =

Girls' singles
- 2024 French Open

Final
- Champion: (Czech Republic) Tereza Valentová
- Runner-up: (Czech Republic) Laura Samson
- Score: 6–3, 7–6^{(7–0)}

Events
Singles	men	women		boys	girls
Doubles	men	women	mixed	boys	girls
WC Singles	men	women	quad	boys	girls
WC Doubles	men	women	quad	boys	girls
- French Open

Tereza Valentová won the girls' singles title at the 2024 French Open, defeating compatriot Laura Samson in the final, 6–3, 7–6^{(7–0)}. This was the first all-Czech junior final in Grand Slam history. Valentová was also the third Czech player in four years to win the girls' singles, after Linda Nosková in 2021 and Lucie Havlíčková in 2022.

Alina Korneeva was the defending champion, but chose not to participate this year.

Gloriana Nahum became the first female player from Benin to win a match in a Grand Slam.

== Seeds ==
1. (Slovakia) Renáta Jamrichová (quarterfinals)
2. (Australia) Emerson Jones (first round)
3. (Czech Republic) Laura Samson (final)
4. (United States) Tyra Caterina Grant (semifinals)
5. (United Kingdom) Hannah Klugman (second round)
6. (Japan) Wakana Sonobe (third round)
7. (United Kingdom) Mingge Xu (second round)
8. (Japan) Ena Koike (first round)
9. (Czech Republic) Alena Kovačková (second round)
10. (United States) Iva Jovic (quarterfinals)
11. (Bulgaria) Iva Ivanova (second round)
12. (Czech Republic) Tereza Valentová (champion)
13. (Chile) Antonia Vergara Rivera (first round)
14. (Spain) Kaitlin Quevedo (third round)
15. (United States) Kaitlyn Rolls (third round)
16. (Serbia) Teodora Kostović (third round)

Click on the seed number of a player to go to their draw section.

== Draw ==
Key

- Q = Qualifier
- WC = Wild card
- LL = Lucky loser
- Alt = Alternate
- ITF = ITF entry
- PR = Protected ranking
- SR = Special ranking
- SE = Special exempt
- JE = Junior exempt
- JR = Junior Accelerator Programme entrant
- CO = College Accelerator Programme entrant
- NG = Next Gen Accelerator Program entrant
- w/o = Walkover
- r = Retired
- d = Defaulted

=== Finals ===
Quarterfinals
1	(Slovakia) Renáta Jamrichová	3	2
12	(Czech Republic) Tereza Valentová	6	6
4	(United States) Tyra Caterina Grant	4	6	6
(Belgium) Jeline Vandromme	6	4	1
10	(United States) Iva Jovic	7^{7}	4	5
3	(Czech Republic) Laura Samson	6^{4}	6	7
(United States) Kristina Penickova	6	6
(Netherlands) Rose Marie Nijkamp	4	1

Semifinals
12	(Czech Republic) Tereza Valentová	6	7^{7}
4	(United States) Tyra Caterina Grant	3	6^{1}
3	(Czech Republic) Laura Samson	6	5	6
(United States) Kristina Penickova	3	7	4

Final
12	(Czech Republic) Tereza Valentová	6	7^{7}
3	(Czech Republic) Laura Samson	3	6^{0}

=== Top half ===
==== Section 1 ====
First round
1	(Slovakia) Renáta Jamrichová	3	6	6
SE	(Bulgaria) Yoana Konstantinova	6	2	1
(Czech Republic) Lucie Urbanová	6	7^{7}
Q	(Sweden) Lea Nilsson	3	6^{3}
(Brazil) Olivia Carneiro	6	2	0
(Poland) Monika Stankiewicz	3	6	6
WC	(France) Margot Phanthala	1	1
16	(Serbia) Teodora Kostović	6	6
12	(Czech Republic) Tereza Valentová	6	6
(Italy) Noemi Basiletti	4	2
Q	(United States) Monika Ekstrand	2	6	1
(Lithuania) Laima Vladson	6	2	6
Kristiana Sidorova	7^{7}	6
WC	(France) Daphnée Mpetshi Perricard	6^{5}	3
(Kazakhstan) Sonja Zhiyenbayeva	3	0
6	(Japan) Wakana Sonobe	6	6

Second round
1	(Slovakia) R Jamrichová	6	6
(Czech Republic) L Urbanová	3	2
(Poland) M Stankiewicz	2	6	2
16	(Serbia) T Kostović	6	3	6
12	(Czech Republic) T Valentová	6	6
(Lithuania) L Vladson	1	2
K Sidorova	6	1	0
6	(Japan) W Sonobe	4	6	6

Third round
1	(Slovakia) R Jamrichová	0	6	6
16	(Serbia) T Kostović	6	3	4
12	(Czech Republic) T Valentová	6	6
6	(Japan) W Sonobe	4	1

Quarterfinals
1	(Slovakia) R Jamrichová	3	2
12	(Czech Republic) T Valentová	6	6

==== Section 2 ====
First round
4	(United States) Tyra Caterina Grant	2	6	6
(Germany) Julia Stusek	6	4	0
(Bulgaria) Rositsa Dencheva	6	6
WC	(Australia) Alana Subasic	2	2
(Spain) Charo Esquiva Bañuls	3	2
Q	(China) Ren Yufei	6	6
(Czech Republic) Vendula Valdmannová	6	4	7
13	(Chile) Antonia Vergara Rivera	2	6	5
9	(Czech Republic) Alena Kovačková	6	6
WC	(France) Dune Vaissaud	4	0
(Dominican Republic) Anna María Fedotova	3	0
(Netherlands) Joy de Zeeuw	6	6
(Belgium) Jeline Vandromme	6	6
Q	Maria Golovina	2	1
(United States) Thea Frodin	4	4
7	(United Kingdom) Mingge Xu	6	6

Second round
4	(United States) TC Grant	6	6
(Bulgaria) R Dencheva	2	2
Q	(China) Y Ren	6	6
(Czech Republic) V Valdmannová	3	3
9	(Czech Republic) A Kovačková	3	4
(Netherlands) J de Zeeuw	6	6
(Belgium) J Vandromme	6	3	6
7	(United Kingdom) M Xu	1	6	2

Third round
4	(United States) TC Grant	6	6
Q	(China) Y Ren	3	4
(Netherlands) J de Zeeuw	1	3
(Belgium) J Vandromme	6	6

Quarterfinals
4	(United States) TC Grant	4	6	6
(Belgium) J Vandromme	6	4	1

=== Bottom half ===
==== Section 3 ====
First round
8	(Japan) Ena Koike	3	6	4
(Benin) Gloriana Nahum	6	2	6
(Kazakhstan) Asylzhan Arystanbekova	4	5
(Czech Republic) Eliška Ticháčková	6	7
Q	(Ukraine) Yelyzaveta Kotliar	6	6
WC	(France) Ophélie Boullay	3	2
(South Korea) Jang Ga-eul	2	2
10	(United States) Iva Jovic	6	6
14	(Spain) Kaitlin Quevedo	6	4	6
WC	(France) Eleejah Inisan	3	6	0
SE	Daria Egorova	6^{6}	6^{5}
(Italy) Vittoria Paganetti	7^{8}	7^{7}
(Bulgaria) Elizara Yaneva	6	6
(United Kingdom) Mika Stojsavljevic	1	2
WC	(Brazil) Nauhany Vitória Leme da Silva	1	1
3	(Czech Republic) Laura Samson	6	6

Second round
(Benin) G Nahum	4	0
(Czech Republic) E Ticháčková	6	6
Q	(Ukraine) Y Kotliar	1	5
10	(United States) I Jovic	6	7
14	(Spain) K Quevedo	6	6
(Italy) V Paganetti	2	2
(Bulgaria) E Yaneva	4	5
3	(Czech Republic) L Samson	6	7

Third round
(Czech Republic) E Ticháčková	6	3	2
10	(United States) I Jovic	3	6	6
14	(Spain) K Quevedo	6^{4}	7	2
3	(Czech Republic) L Samson	7^{7}	5	6

Quarterfinals
10	(United States) I Jovic	7^{7}	4	5
3	(Czech Republic) L Samson	6^{4}	6	7

==== Section 4 ====
First round
5	(United Kingdom) Hannah Klugman	6	4	6
(Argentina) Luna María Cinalli	4	6	0
WC	(France) Alice Soulié	3	4
Q	(Slovakia) Mia Pohánková	6	6
(United States) Kristina Penickova	7^{7}	6
(Norway) Emily Sartz-Lunde	6^{4}	4
(Japan) Mayu Crossley	4	6	6^{6}
11	(Bulgaria) Iva Ivanova	6	2	7^{10}
15	(United States) Kaitlyn Rolls	7	6
(Germany) Sonja Zhenikhova	5	3
(Morocco) Malak El Allami	3	6	6
Q	(Sweden) Nellie Taraba Wallberg	6	3	2
(Czech Republic) Julie Paštiková	3	3
(Netherlands) Rose Marie Nijkamp	6	6
Q	Daria Shadchneva	7^{7}	6
2	(Australia) Emerson Jones	6^{3}	4

Second round
5	(United Kingdom) H Klugman	0	6	5
Q	(Slovakia) M Pohánková	6	4	7
(United States) K Penickova	6	6
11	(Bulgaria) I Ivanova	4	3
15	(United States) K Rolls	6	4	6
(Morocco) M El Allami	2	6	3
(Netherlands) RM Nijkamp	6	3	7^{10}
Q	D Shadchneva	3	6	6^{4}

Third round
Q	(Slovakia) M Pohánková	2	2
(United States) K Penickova	6	6
15	(United States) K Rolls	2	2
(Netherlands) RM Nijkamp	6	6

Quarterfinals
(United States) K Penickova	6	6
(Netherlands) RM Nijkamp	4	1

== Qualifying ==
=== Seeds ===
1. (Ukraine) Yelyzaveta Kotliar (qualified)
2. (Japan) Reina Goto (first round)
3. (United States) Shannon Lam (qualifying competition)
4. Yuliya Perapekhina (qualifying competition)
5. (Sweden) Lea Nilsson (qualified)
6. (Israel) Mika Buchnik (first round)
7. (United States) Kate Fakih (qualifying competition)
8. (Spain) Ruth Roura Llaverias (first round)
9. (Japan) Hikari Yamamoto (first round)
10. (United States) Christasha McNeil (qualifying competition)
11. (Colombia) Valentina Mediorreal (qualifying competition)
12. (United Kingdom) Gabia Paskauskas (first round)
13. Victoria Milovanova (qualifying competition)
14. (Sweden) Nellie Taraba Wallberg (qualified)
15. (Italy) Gaia Maduzzi (first round)
16. Maria Golovina (qualified)

=== Qualifiers ===
1. (Ukraine) Yelyzaveta Kotliar
2. (United States) Monika Ekstrand
3. Maria Golovina
4. (Sweden) Nellie Taraba Wallberg
5. (Sweden) Lea Nilsson
6. (China) Ren Yufei
7. (Slovakia) Mia Pohánková
8. Daria Shadchneva

=== Draw ===
==== First qualifier ====
First round
1	(Ukraine) Yelyzaveta Kotliar	6	7^{7}
(United States) Claire An	2	6^{2}
WC	(France) Massiva Boukirat	1	1
13	Victoria Milovanova	6	6

Qualifying competition
1	(Ukraine) Yelyzaveta Kotliar	7^{7}	7
13	Victoria Milovanova	6^{3}	5

==== Second qualifier ====
First round
2	(Japan) Reina Goto	2	3
WC	(France) Seda Baslilar	6	6
(United States) Monika Ekstrand	4	6	6
12	(United Kingdom) Gabia Paskauskas	6	4	3

Qualifying competition
WC	(France) Seda Baslilar	2	4
(United States) Monika Ekstrand	6	6

==== Third qualifier ====
First round
3	(United States) Shannon Lam	6	6
(Romania) Elena Ruxandra Bertea	2	4
WC	(France) Séverine Deppner	7	1	3
16	Maria Golovina	5	6	6

Qualifying competition
3	(United States) Shannon Lam	3	6	3
16	Maria Golovina	6	1	6

==== Fourth qualifier ====
First round
4	Yuliya Perapekhina	7^{7}	4	6
WC	(France) Lila Grace Bachour	6^{5}	6	3
(Japan) Kanon Sawashiro	0	3
14	(Sweden) Nellie Taraba Wallberg	6	6

Qualifying competition
4	Yuliya Perapekhina	4	6	2
14	(Sweden) Nellie Taraba Wallberg	6	1	6

==== Fifth qualifier ====
First round
5	(Sweden) Lea Nilsson	7	6
(Egypt) Jana Hossam Salah	5	2
(China) Zhang Junhan	1	3
11	(Colombia) Valentina Mediorreal	6	6

Qualifying competition
5	(Sweden) Lea Nilsson	6	6
11	(Colombia) Valentina Mediorreal	1	3

==== Sixth qualifier ====
First round
6	(Israel) Mika Buchnik	1	6	3
(United States) Mia Slama	6	4	6
(China) Ren Yufei	6	6
15	(Italy) Gaia Maduzzi	3	2

Qualifying competition
(United States) Mia Slama	6	2	4
(China) Ren Yufei	2	6	6

==== Seventh qualifier ====
First round
7	(United States) Kate Fakih	6	7
WC	(France) Louna Zoppas	1	5
(Slovakia) Mia Pohánková	6	6
9	(Japan) Hikari Yamamoto	2	3

Qualifying competition
7	(United States) Kate Fakih	0	4
(Slovakia) Mia Pohánková	6	6

==== Eighth qualifier ====
First round
8	(Spain) Ruth Roura Llaverias	3	3
Daria Shadchneva	6	6
WC	(France) Victoire Lansaman	1	1
10	(United States) Christasha McNeil	6	6

Qualifying competition
Daria Shadchneva	6	6
10	(United States) Christasha McNeil	4	4
