= 2024 French Open – Girls' doubles =

Junior Tennis Tournament

Girls' doubles
- 2024 French Open

Final
- Champions: (Slovakia) Renáta Jamrichová (Czech Republic) Tereza Valentová
- Runners-up: (United States) Tyra Caterina Grant (United States) Iva Jovic
- Score: 6–4, 6–4

Events
Singles	men	women		boys	girls
Doubles	men	women	mixed	boys	girls
WC Singles	men	women	quad
WC Doubles	men	women	quad
← 2023 ·	French Open	· 2025 →

Renáta Jamrichová and Tereza Valentová won the girls' doubles title at the 2024 French Open, defeating Tyra Caterina Grant and Iva Jovic in the final, 6–4, 6–4.

Grant and Clervie Ngounoue were the defending champions, but Ngounoue chose not to participate.

== Seeds ==
1. (Czech Republic) Alena Kovačková / (Czech Republic) Laura Samson (semifinals)
2. (United Kingdom) Hannah Klugman / (United Kingdom) Mingge Xu (quarterfinals)
3. (Slovakia) Renáta Jamrichová / (Czech Republic) Tereza Valentová (champions)
4. (United States) Tyra Caterina Grant / (United States) Iva Jovic (final)
5. (Australia) Emerson Jones / (Italy) Vittoria Paganetti (semifinals)
6. (Japan) Mayu Crossley / (Chile) Antonia Vergara Rivera (second round)
7. (Japan) Wakana Sonobe / (United Kingdom) Mika Stojsavljevic (quarterfinals)
8. (Bulgaria) Rositsa Dencheva / (Poland) Monika Stankiewicz (second round)

== Draw ==
=== Key ===
- Q = Qualifier
- WC = Wild card
- LL = Lucky loser
- Alt = Alternate
- ITF = ITF entry
- PR = Protected ranking
- SR = Special ranking
- SE = Special exempt
- JE = Junior exempt
- JR = Junior Accelerator Programme entrant
- CO = College Accelerator Programme entrant
- NG = Next Gen Accelerator Program entrant
- w/o = Walkover
- r = Retired
- d = Defaulted

=== Finals ===
Semifinals
1	(Czech Republic) Alena Kovačková (Czech Republic) Laura Samson	1	4
4	(United States) Tyra Caterina Grant (United States) Iva Jovic	6	6
3	(Slovakia) Renáta Jamrichová (Czech Republic) Tereza Valentová	7	6
5	(Australia) Emerson Jones (Italy) Vittoria Paganetti	5	2

Final
4	(United States) Tyra Caterina Grant (United States) Iva Jovic	4	4
3	(Slovakia) Renáta Jamrichová (Czech Republic) Tereza Valentová	6	6

=== Top half ===
First round
1	(Czech Republic) Alena Kovačková (Czech Republic) Laura Samson	7	6
(South Korea) Jang Ga-eul; Kristiana Sidorova	5	4
(Bulgaria) Yoana Konstantinova (Serbia) Teodora Kostović	6	6
(Bulgaria) Elizara Yaneva (Germany) Sonja Zhenikhova	3	3
(Morocco) Malak El Allami (Netherlands) Rose Marie Nijkamp	6	6
(Brazil) Olivia Carneiro (Australia) Alana Subasic	0	4
WC	(France) Ophélie Boullay (France) Daphnée Mpetshi Perricard	1	3
7	(Japan) Wakana Sonobe (United Kingdom) Mika Stojsavljevic	6	6	5
4	(United States) Tyra Caterina Grant (United States) Iva Jovic	6	6
(Benin) Gloriana Nahum (Lithuania) Laima Vladson	2	2
WC	(France) Eleejah Inisan (France) Alice Soulié	4	6	[8]
(Sweden) Lea Nilsson (Sweden) Nellie Taraba Wallberg	6	4	[10]
(Italy) Noemi Basiletti (Netherlands) Joy de Zeeuw	7	6
(Argentina) Luna María Cinalli (Dominican Republic) Anna María Fedotova	5	3
(United States) Kaitlyn Rolls (Belgium) Jeline Vandromme	6	3	[6]
8	(Bulgaria) Rositsa Dencheva (Poland) Monika Stankiewicz	2	6	[10]

Second round
1	(Czech Republic) A Kovačková (Czech Republic) L Samson	4	6	[10]
(Bulgaria) Y Konstantinova (Serbia) T Kostović	6	0	[5]
(Morocco) M El Allami (Netherlands) RM Nijkamp	2	6^{5}
7	(Japan) W Sonobe (United Kingdom) M Stojsavljevic	6	7^{7}	1
4	(United States) TC Grant (United States) I Jovic	6	7^{7}
(Sweden) L Nilsson (Sweden) N Taraba Wallberg	2	6^{1}
(Italy) N Basiletti (Netherlands) J de Zeeuw	7^{9}	6
8	(Bulgaria) R Dencheva (Poland) M Stankiewicz	6^{7}	3

Quarterfinals
1	(Czech Republic) A Kovačková (Czech Republic) L Samson	7	7^{7}
7	(Japan) W Sonobe (United Kingdom) M Stojsavljevic	5	6^{5}	-1
4	(United States) TC Grant (United States) I Jovic	6	6
(Italy) N Basiletti (Netherlands) J de Zeeuw	4	3

Semifinals
1	(Czech Republic) A Kovačková (Czech Republic) L Samson	1	4
4	(United States) TC Grant (United States) I Jovic	6	6

=== Bottom half ===
First round
6	(Japan) Mayu Crossley (Chile) Antonia Vergara Rivera	6	3	[10]
(United States) Monika Ekstrand (United States) Thea Frodin	4	6	[5]
WC	(France) Seda Baslilar (France) Cindy Langlais	2	2
(Czech Republic) Julie Paštiková (Germany) Julia Stusek	6	6
(Colombia) Valentina Mediorreal (Slovakia) Mia Pohánková	1	6	[10]
Maria Golovina; Daria Shadchneva	6	2	[6]
(United States) Kristina Penickova (Czech Republic) Vendula Valdmannová	5	4
3	(Slovakia) Renáta Jamrichová (Czech Republic) Tereza Valentová	7	6
5	(Australia) Emerson Jones (Italy) Vittoria Paganetti	6	4	[10]
(Kazakhstan) Asylzhan Arystanbekova (Kazakhstan) Sonja Zhiyenbayeva	4	6	[7]
(Czech Republic) Eliška Ticháčková (Czech Republic) Lucie Urbanová	6	6
(Spain) Charo Esquiva Banuls (Bulgaria) Iva Ivanova	1	3
(United States) Kate Fakih (Norway) Emily Sartz-Lunde	6	6
Daria Egorova; Yuliya Perapekhina	1	2
WC	(France) Margot Phanthala (France) Dune Vaissaud	1	0
2	(United Kingdom) Hannah Klugman (United Kingdom) Mingge Xu	6	6

Second round
6	(Japan) M Crossley (Chile) A Vergara Rivera	4	7^{7}	[4]
(Czech Republic) J Paštiková (Germany) J Stusek	6	6^{2}	[10]
(Colombia) V Mediorreal (Slovakia) M Pohánková	2	0
3	(Slovakia) R Jamrichová (Czech Republic) T Valentová	6	6
5	(Australia) E Jones (Italy) V Paganetti	6	7^{7}
(Czech Republic) E Ticháčková (Czech Republic) L Urbanová	4	6^{4}
(United States) K Fakih (Norway) E Sartz-Lunde	3	1
2	(United Kingdom) H Klugman (United Kingdom) M Xu	6	6

Quarterfinals
(Czech Republic) J Paštiková (Germany) J Stusek	2	1
3	(Slovakia) R Jamrichová (Czech Republic) T Valentová	6	6
5	(Australia) E Jones (Italy) V Paganetti	6	7
2	(United Kingdom) H Klugman (United Kingdom) M Xu	4	5

Semifinals
3	(Slovakia) R Jamrichová (Czech Republic) T Valentová	7	6
5	(Australia) E Jones (Italy) V Paganetti	5	2
