= 2026 AXERIA Open =

- Date: 27 July–2 August
- Edition: 1st
- Category: WTA 125
- Draw: 32S / 16D
- Prize money: $115,000
- Surface: Clay
- Location: Târgu Mureș, Romania
- Venue: Baza INTARO Sport

Champions

Singles
- (Czech Republic) Laura Samson

Doubles
- (Croatia) Lucija Ćirić Bagarić / (Italy) Angelica Moratelli
- AXERIA Open

The 2026 AXERIA Open powered by INTARO Sport was a professional women's tennis tournament played on outdoor clay courts. It was the 1st edition of the event, which was also part of the 2026 WTA 125 tournaments. It took place in Târgu Mureș, Romania, from 27 July through 2 August 2026.

== Singles main draw entrants ==
=== Seeds ===
Country	Player	Rank^{†}	Seed
ESP	Kaitlin Quevedo	101	1
LAT	Darja Semeņistaja	109	2
GBR	Francesca Jones	113	3
ITA	Lucia Bronzetti	120	4
CZE	Laura Samson	150	5
ESP	Leyre Romero Gormaz	153	6
SRB	Lola Radivojević	154	7
FRA	Carole Monnet	192	8

^{†} Ranking are as of 20 July 2026.

=== Other entrants ===
The following players received wildcards into the singles main draw :

- (Romania) Alesia Breaz
- (Romania) Maia Ilinca Burcescu
- (Romania) Irina Fetecău
- (United States) Rachel Gailis

The following players received entry from the qualifying draw :

- (Croatia) Lucija Ćirić Bagarić
- (Ukraine) Yelyzaveta Kotliar
- (France) Margaux Rouvroy
- (Italy) Miriana Tona

=== Withdrawals ===
Before the tournament

- (Slovenia) Veronika Erjavec → replaced by (Spain) Irene Burillo
- (Georgia (country)) Ekaterine Gorgodze → replaced by (Czech Republic) Julie Štruplová
- (Slovenia) Kaja Juvan → replaced by (Romania) Elena Ruxandra Bertea
- (Montenegro) Danka Kovinić → replaced by (France) Chloe Paquet
- Aliaksandra Sasnovich → replaced by (Italy) Dalila Spiteri
- (United States) Vivian Wolff → replaced by (Estonia) Elena Malygina
- Anastasia Zolotareva → replaced by Alevtina Ibragimova

=== Retirements ===
- (United Kingdom) Francesca Jones
- (Ukraine) Anastasiia Sobolieva

== Doubles main draw entrants ==
=== Seeds ===
Country	Player	Country	Player	Rank^{1}	Seed
GBR	Madeleine Brooks	NED	Isabelle Haverlag	172	1
ESP	Yvonne Cavallé Reimers	BEL	Lara Salden	255	2
TPE	Li Yu-yun	CHN	Ye Qiuyu	273	3
ROU	Irina Bara	SUI	Naïma Karamoko	287	4

- ^{1} Rankings as of 20 July 2026.

=== Other entrants ===
The following pairs received a wildcard into the doubles main draw:

- (Romania) Alesia Breaz / (United States) Rachel Gailis

== Finals ==
=== Singles ===
- (Czech Republic) Laura Samson def. (Spain) Kaitlin Quevedo 2–6, 6–3, 6–1

=== Doubles ===
- (Croatia) Lucija Ćirić Bagarić / (Italy) Angelica Moratelli def. (Spain) Yvonne Cavallé Reimers / (Belgium) Lara Salden 6–3, 1–6, [11–9]
