= 2026 Cundinamarca Open – Singles =

Singles
- 2026 Cundinamarca Open

Final
- Champion: (Canada) Bianca Andreescu
- Runner-up: (United States) Elizabeth Mandlik
- Score: 6–3, 6–3

Details
- Draw: 32 (4Q / 4WC)
- Seeds: 8

Events
Singles	Doubles
- Cundinamarca Open

Bianca Andreescu won the title, defeating Elizabeth Mandlik in the final, 6–3, 6–3.

This was the first edition of the tournament.

== Seeds ==
1. (Germany) Tatjana Maria (second round)
2. (France) Léolia Jeanjean (withdrew)
3. (Canada) Bianca Andreescu (champion)
4. (Austria) Julia Grabher (second round)
5. (Czech Republic) Laura Samson (semifinals)
6. (Spain) Marina Bassols Ribera (quarterfinals, retired)
7. (Spain) Leyre Romero Gormaz (first round)
8. (Italy) Lucia Bronzetti (second round)

== Draw ==
Key

- Q = Qualifier
- WC = Wild card
- LL = Lucky loser
- Alt = Alternate
- ITF = ITF entry
- PR = Protected ranking
- SR = Special ranking
- SE = Special exempt
- JE = Junior exempt
- JR = Junior Accelerator Programme entrant
- CO = College Accelerator Programme entrant
- NG = Next Gen Accelerator Program entrant
- w/o = Walkover
- r = Retired
- d = Defaulted

=== Finals ===
Semifinals
(Slovenia) Polona Hercog	1	4
3	(Canada) Bianca Andreescu	6	6
5	(Czech Republic) Laura Samson	3	3
(United States) Elizabeth Mandlik	6	6

Final
3	(Canada) Bianca Andreescu	6	6
(United States) Elizabeth Mandlik	3	3

=== Top half ===
First round
1	(Germany) T Maria	4	7	7
(Argentina) L Giovannini	6	5	5
(France) A Tubello	7^{9}	6
(Argentina) J Riera	6^{7}	2
(Slovenia) P Hercog	6	7^{7}
(United States) V Lepchenko	2	6^{3}
(France) C Monnet	6	7^{7}
7	(Spain) L Romero Gormaz	4	6^{2}
3	(Canada) B Andreescu	3	6	6
(Switzerland) R Masarova	6	3	4
(Brazil) L Pigossi	6	6
Q	(Slovenia) D Jakupović	3	3
(Argentina) ML Carlé	6	4	6
WC	(Colombia) V Mediorreal Arias	3	6	2
Q	(Colombia) M Herazo González	1	4
6	(Spain) M Bassols Ribera	6	6

Second round
1	(Germany) T Maria	5	4
(France) A Tubello	7	6
(Slovenia) P Hercog	6	6
(France) C Monnet	3	0
3	(Canada) B Andreescu	6	7
(Brazil) L Pigossi	1	5
(Argentina) ML Carlé	5	2
6	(Spain) M Bassols Ribera	7	6

Quarterfinals
(France) A Tubello	2	3
(Slovenia) P Hercog	6	6
3	(Canada) B Andreescu	6	4
6	(Spain) M Bassols Ribera	4	2^{r}

Semifinals
(Slovenia) P Hercog	1	4
3	(Canada) B Andreescu	6	6

=== Bottom half ===
First round
5	(Czech Republic) L Samson	6^{3}	7^{7}	6
Q	(Brazil) C Alves	7^{7}	6^{5}	1
(Belgium) S Costoulas	6	6
WC	(Colombia) A Esquivel Useche	0	1
(Spain) I Burillo	6	6
WC	(Colombia) Y Lizarazo	2	2
(Slovenia) T Zidanšek	2	4
4	(Austria) J Grabher	6	6
8	(Italy) L Bronzetti	6	4	6
WC	(United States) J Pareja	3	6	3
(United States) E Mandlik	6	4	6
(Slovenia) V Erjavec	3	6	2
Q	(United States) K Scott	7^{7}	5	4
(Spain) A Lázaro García	6^{3}	7	6
(Argentina) J Ortenzi	6	6
LL	(Colombia) M Torres Murcia	2	3

Second round
5	(Czech Republic) L Samson	6	6
(Belgium) S Costoulas	2	2
(Spain) I Burillo	7	7^{7}
4	(Austria) J Grabher	5	6^{4}
8	(Italy) L Bronzetti	6^{5}	3
(United States) E Mandlik	7^{7}	6
(Spain) A Lázaro García	2	6	6
(Argentina) J Ortenzi	6	4	4

Quarterfinals
5	(Czech Republic) L Samson	7	6
(Spain) I Burillo	5	3
(United States) E Mandlik	6	7^{7}
(Spain) A Lázaro García	0	6^{5}

Semifinals
5	(Czech Republic) L Samson	3	3
(United States) E Mandlik	6	6

== Qualifying ==
=== Seeds ===
1. (Brazil) Carolina Alves (qualified)
2. (United States) Katrina Scott (qualified)
3. (Slovenia) Dalila Jakupović (qualified)
4. (Colombia) María Herazo González (qualified)

=== Qualifiers ===
1. (Brazil) Carolina Alves
2. (United States) Katrina Scott
3. (Slovenia) Dalila Jakupović
4. (Colombia) María Herazo González

=== Lucky loser ===
1. (Colombia) María Torres Murcia

=== Qualifying draw ===
==== First qualifier ====
Qualifying competition
1	(Brazil) Carolina Alves	6	6
WC	(Colombia) Sara Alejandra Lozano Avellaneda	0	0

==== Second qualifier ====
Qualifying competition
2	(United States) Katrina Scott	6	6
	(Colombia) María Torres Murcia	2	4

==== Third qualifier ====
Qualifying competition
3	(Slovenia) Dalila Jakupović	6	6
WC	(Colombia) Isabella Collazos	1	1

==== Fourth qualifier ====
Qualifying competition
4	(Colombia) María Herazo González	6	6
	(Colombia) María José Sánchez Uribe	1	2
