= 2026 AXERIA Open – Singles =

Singles
- 2026 AXERIA Open

Final
- Champion: (Czech Republic) Laura Samson
- Runner-up: (Spain) Kaitlin Quevedo
- Score: 2–6, 6–3, 6–1

Details
- Draw: 32 (4Q / 4WC)
- Seeds: 8

Events
Singles	Doubles
- AXERIA Open

This was the first edition of the tournament.

Laura Samson won the title, defeating Kaitlin Quevedo 2–6, 6–3, 6–1 in the final.

== Seeds ==
1. (Spain) Kaitlin Quevedo (final)
2. (Latvia) Darja Semeņistaja (first round)
3. (United Kingdom) Francesca Jones (semifinals, retired)
4. (Italy) Lucia Bronzetti (semifinals)
5. (Czech Republic) Laura Samson (champion)
6. (Spain) Leyre Romero Gormaz (first round)
7. (Serbia) Lola Radivojević (first round)
8. (France) Carole Monnet (quarterfinals)

== Draw ==
Key

- Q = Qualifier
- WC = Wild card
- LL = Lucky loser
- Alt = Alternate
- ITF = ITF entry
- PR = Protected ranking
- SR = Special ranking
- SE = Special exempt
- JE = Junior exempt
- JR = Junior Accelerator Programme entrant
- CO = College Accelerator Programme entrant
- NG = Next Gen Accelerator Program entrant
- w/o = Walkover
- r = Retired
- d = Defaulted

=== Finals ===
Semifinals
1	(Spain) Kaitlin Quevedo	7^{7}	0
3	(United Kingdom) Francesca Jones	6^{5}	0^{r}
4	(Italy) Lucia Bronzetti	5	4
5	(Czech Republic) Laura Samson	7	6

Final
1	(Spain) Kaitlin Quevedo	6	3	1
5	(Czech Republic) Laura Samson	2	6	6

=== Top half ===
First round
1	(Spain) K Quevedo	6	6
WC	(Romania) I Fetecău	1	3
(Spain) I Burillo	2	6	6
S Lansere	6	4	4
(Estonia) E Malygina	3	3
(Romania) ER Bertea	6	6
(Romania) M Bulgaru	1	3
8	(France) C Monnet	6	6
3	(United Kingdom) F Jones	6	1	6
(France) C Paquet	0	6	0
Q	(Croatia) L Ćirić Bagarić	6	6
WC	(United States) R Gailis	2	1
(France) A Ramé	6	5	6
(Czech Republic) J Štruplová	2	7	1
Q	(France) M Rouvroy	0	6	7^{7}
7	(Serbia) L Radivojević	6	3	6^{4}

Second round
1	(Spain) K Quevedo	7	6
(Spain) I Burillo	5	1
(Romania) ER Bertea	6^{1}	5
8	(France) C Monnet	7^{7}	7
3	(United Kingdom) F Jones	7	6
Q	(Croatia) L Ćirić Bagarić	5	3
(France) A Ramé	6	6
Q	(France) M Rouvroy	2	4

Quarterfinals
1	(Spain) K Quevedo	7^{7}	6
8	(France) C Monnet	6^{4}	3
3	(United Kingdom) F Jones	6	6
(France) A Ramé	1	2

Semifinals
1	(Spain) K Quevedo	7^{7}	0
3	(United Kingdom) F Jones	6^{5}	0^{r}

=== Bottom half ===
First round
6	(Spain) L Romero Gormaz	6	3	3
(Spain) S Sorribes Tormo	3	6	6
(Sweden) C Hennemann	6	4	6
(Slovakia) M Pohánková	1	6	4
A Ibragimova	6	3	7
WC	(Romania) MI Burcescu	4	6	5
Q	(Italy) M Tona	2	2
4	(Italy) L Bronzetti	6	6
5	(Czech Republic) L Samson	6	6
WC	(Romania) A Breaz	4	3
(France) S Janicijevic	4	2
(Ukraine) A Sobolieva	6	6
Q	(Ukraine) Y Kotliar	5	6	6
(Italy) D Spiteri	7	3	2
(Serbia) M Ristić	6	6
2	(Latvia) D Semeņistaja	2	3

Second round
(Spain) S Sorribes Tormo	6	6
(Sweden) C Hennemann	1	3
A Ibragimova	3	2
4	(Italy) L Bronzetti	6	6
5	(Czech Republic) L Samson	4
(Ukraine) A Sobolieva	2^{r}
Q	(Ukraine) Y Kotliar	6	2	6^{4}
(Serbia) M Ristić	2	6	7^{7}

Quarterfinals
(Spain) S Sorribes Tormo	3	6	5
4	(Italy) L Bronzetti	6	2	7
5	(Czech Republic) L Samson	7^{7}	4	6
(Serbia) M Ristić	6^{0}	6	2

Semifinals
4	(Italy) L Bronzetti	5	4
5	(Czech Republic) L Samson	7	6

== Qualifying ==
=== Seeds ===
1. (Poland) Gina Feistel (first round, retired)
2. (France) Amandine Monnot (first round)
3. (Italy) Deborah Chiesa (first round)
4. (Estonia) Elena Malygina (moved into main draw)
5. (Italy) Miriana Tona (qualified)
6. (France) Margaux Rouvroy (qualified)
7. (Italy) Alessandra Mazzola (first round)
8. (Hungary) Amarissa Tóth (first round, retired)

=== Qualifiers ===
1. (Italy) Miriana Tona
2. (Croatia) Lucija Ćirić Bagarić
3. (Ukraine) Yelyzaveta Kotliar
4. (France) Margaux Rouvroy

=== Qualifying draw ===
==== First qualifier ====
First round
1	(Poland) Gina Feistel	5	2^{r}
WC	(Romania) Briana Szabo	7	3
(Bulgaria) Isabella Shinikova	2	3
5	(Italy) Miriana Tona	6	6

Qualifying competition
WC	(Romania) Briana Szabo	6	4	4
5	(Italy) Miriana Tona	4	6	6

==== Second qualifier ====
First round
2	(France) Amandine Monnot	6^{8}	0
(Croatia) Lucija Ćirić Bagarić	7^{10}	6
(Romania) Maria Sara Popa	6	3
8	(Hungary) Amarissa Tóth	3	1^{r}

Qualifying competition
(Croatia) Lucija Ćirić Bagarić	6	6
(Romania) Maria Sara Popa	4	2

==== Third qualifier ====
First round
3	(Italy) Deborah Chiesa	6^{5}	2
(Romania) Andreea Prisăcariu	7^{7}	6
(Ukraine) Yelyzaveta Kotliar	5	6	6
7	(Italy) Alessandra Mazzola	7	2	2

Qualifying competition
(Romania) Andreea Prisăcariu	4	0
(Ukraine) Yelyzaveta Kotliar	6	6

==== Fourth qualifier ====
First round
Alt	Ekaterina Yashina	2	2
Ekaterina Kazionova	6	6
WC	(United States) Diana Maria Ilie	1	1
6	(France) Margaux Rouvroy	6	6

Qualifying competition
Ekaterina Kazionova	4	6	5
6	(France) Margaux Rouvroy	6	3	7
