= 2025 Prague Open – Singles =

Singles
- 2025 Prague Open

Final
- Champion: (Czech Republic) Marie Bouzková
- Runner-up: (Czech Republic) Linda Nosková
- Score: 2–6, 6–1, 6–3

Details
- Draw: 32 (6Q / 4WC)
- Seeds: 8

Events
| Singles | Doubles |
- WTA Prague Open

Marie Bouzková defeated Linda Nosková in the final, 2–6, 6–1, 6–3 to win the singles tennis title at the 2025 Prague Open. It was her second career WTA Tour singles title, and her second title at the tournament, after 2022.

Magda Linette was the reigning champion, but chose to compete in Washington instead.

Eight Czech players reached the round of 16, a record for a WTA Tour event.

== Seeds ==
1. (Czech Republic) Linda Nosková (final)
2. (Slovakia) Rebecca Šramková (second round)
3. (Ukraine) Dayana Yastremska (withdrew)
4. (China) Wang Xinyu (semifinals)
5. (Czech Republic) Marie Bouzková (champion)
6. (Armenia) Elina Avanesyan (withdrew)
7. (Romania) Elena-Gabriela Ruse (first round)
8. (United States) Alycia Parks (second round)
9. (United States) Ann Li (quarterfinals)

== Draw ==
Key

- Q = Qualifier
- WC = Wild card
- LL = Lucky loser
- Alt = Alternate
- ITF = ITF entry
- PR = Protected ranking
- SR = Special ranking
- SE = Special exempt
- JE = Junior exempt
- JR = Junior Accelerator Programme entrant
- CO = College Accelerator Programme entrant
- NG = Next Gen Accelerator Program entrant
- w/o = Walkover
- r = Retired
- d = Defaulted

=== Finals ===
Semifinals
1 | (Czech Republic) Linda Nosková | 6 | 6
4 | (China) Wang Xinyu | 4 | 1
5 | (Czech Republic) Marie Bouzková | 6 | 7
(Czech Republic) Tereza Valentová | 4 | 5

Final
1 | (Czech Republic) Linda Nosková | 6 | 1 | 3
5 | (Czech Republic) Marie Bouzková | 2 | 6 | 6

=== Top half ===
First round
1 | (Czech Republic) L Nosková | 7^{7} | 7^{9}
Q | A Gasanova | 6^{5} | 6^{7}
(Switzerland) V Golubic | 2 | 3
(Italy) E Cocciaretto | 6 | 6
WC | (Czech Republic) L Samson | 3 | 3
WC | (Czech Republic) D Šalková | 6 | 6
(Czech Republic) K Siniaková | 7 | 6
7 | (Romania) E-G Ruse | 5 | 2
4 | (China) Xin Wang | 6 | 6
(United Kingdom) H Dart | 3 | 3
WC | (Czech Republic) L Havlíčková | 7 | 6
Q | (Czech Republic) A Kovačková | 5 | 1
(Czech Republic) S Bejlek | 7 | 6
(Japan) M Uchijima | 5 | 2
Q | (Japan) M Hontama | 4 | 2
8 | (United States) A Parks | 6 | 6

Second round
1 | (Czech Republic) L Nosková | 6 | 6
(Italy) E Cocciaretto | 2 | 4
WC | (Czech Republic) D Šalková | 6^{4} | 3
(Czech Republic) K Siniaková | 7^{7} | 6
4 | (China) Xin Wang | 3 | 7 | 7^{8}
WC | (Czech Republic) L Havlíčková | 6 | 5 | 6^{6}
(Czech Republic) S Bejlek | 7^{11} | 6
8 | (United States) A Parks | 6^{9} | 3

Quarterfinals
1 | (Czech Republic) L Nosková | 6 | 4 | 6
(Czech Republic) K Siniaková | 2 | 6 | 3
4 | (China) Xin Wang | 6 | 6
(Czech Republic) S Bejlek | 4 | 1

Semifinals
1 | (Czech Republic) L Nosková | 6 | 6
4 | (China) Xin Wang | 4 | 1

=== Bottom half ===
First round
5 | (Czech Republic) M Bouzková | 6 | 6
Q | (China) X Gao | 0 | 2
(Bulgaria) V Tomova | 1 | 6^{3}
LL | (Italy) L Stefanini | 6 | 7^{7}
(France) L Jeanjean | 6 | 2
(Spain) N Párrizas Díaz | 3 | 0^{r}
Q | (Australia) A Sharma | 6^{1} | 3
9 | (United States) A Li | 7^{7} | 6
LL | (Serbia) N Stojanović | 6 | 5 | 1
LL | (France) J Ponchet | 4 | 7 | 6
WC | (Czech Republic) B Palicová | 6 | 3 | 6
(Australia) P Hon | 2 | 6 | 3
(Japan) A Ito | 2 | 0
(Czech Republic) T Valentová | 6 | 6
Q | (Czech Republic) J Malečková | 3 | 6 | 4
2 | (Slovakia) R Šramková | 6 | 4 | 6

Second round
5 | (Czech Republic) M Bouzková | 6 | 6
LL | (Italy) L Stefanini | 4 | 4
(France) L Jeanjean | 4 | 3
9 | (United States) A Li | 6 | 6
LL | (France) J Ponchet | 6 | 7
WC | (Czech Republic) B Palicová | 1 | 5
(Czech Republic) T Valentová | 7^{7} | 7
2 | (Slovakia) R Šramková | 6^{1} | 5

Quarterfinals
5 | (Czech Republic) M Bouzková | 3 | 6 | 6
9 | (United States) A Li | 6 | 3 | 3
LL | (France) J Ponchet | 2 | 0
(Czech Republic) T Valentová | 6 | 6

Semifinals
5 | (Czech Republic) M Bouzková | 6 | 7
(Czech Republic) T Valentová | 4 | 5

== Qualifying ==
=== Seeds ===
1. (Australia) Priscilla Hon (moved to main draw)
2. (Australia) Astra Sharma (qualified)
3. (France) Jessika Ponchet (qualifying competition, lucky loser)
4. (Italy) Lucrezia Stefanini (qualifying competition, lucky loser)
5. (Serbia) Nina Stojanović (qualifying competition, lucky loser)
6. (Germany) Tamara Korpatsch (first round)
7. (China) Gao Xinyu (qualified)
8. (Japan) Mai Hontama (qualified)
9. (Japan) Kyōka Okamura (first round)
10. (Australia) Arina Rodionova (first round)
11. (Slovakia) Viktória Hrunčáková (first round)
12. (Switzerland) Valentina Ryser (first round)

=== Qualifiers ===
1. (Czech Republic) Jesika Malečková
2. (Australia) Astra Sharma
3. Anastasia Gasanova
4. (Czech Republic) Alena Kovačková
5. (China) Gao Xinyu
6. (Japan) Mai Hontama

=== Lucky losers ===
1. (Italy) Lucrezia Stefanini
2. (France) Jessika Ponchet
3. (Serbia) Nina Stojanović

=== Qualifying draw ===
==== First qualifier ====
First round
Alt | (Italy) Nicole Fossa Huergo | 1 | 6 | 6
(Finland) Anastasia Kulikova | 6 | 3 | 4
(Czech Republic) Jesika Malečková | 6 | 3 | 7
9 | (Japan) Kyōka Okamura | 4 | 6 | 5

Qualifying competition
Alt | (Italy) Nicole Fossa Huergo | 2 | 4
(Czech Republic) Jesika Malečková | 6 | 6

==== Second qualifier ====
First round
2 | (Australia) Astra Sharma | 6 | 6
(Germany) Mina Hodzic | 1 | 4
PR | (Romania) Mihaela Buzărnescu | 7^{10} | 3 | 6
12 | (Switzerland) Valentina Ryser | 6^{8} | 6 | 4

Qualifying competition
2 | (Australia) Astra Sharma | 6 | 6
PR | (Romania) Mihaela Buzărnescu | 2 | 1

==== Third qualifier ====
First round
3 | (France) Jessika Ponchet | 6 | 6
WC | (Czech Republic) Miriam Škoch | 2 | 4
Anastasia Gasanova | 6 | 6
11 | (Slovakia) Viktória Hrunčáková | 4 | 4

Qualifying competition
3 | (France) Jessika Ponchet | 6 | 6^{2} | 2
Anastasia Gasanova | 1 | 7^{7} | 6

==== Fourth qualifier ====
First round
4 | (Italy) Lucrezia Stefanini | 2 | 6 | 6
(Germany) Caroline Werner | 6 | 3 | 3
WC | (Czech Republic) Alena Kovačková | 6 | 6^{2} | 7^{7}
10 | (Australia) Arina Rodionova | 1 | 7^{7} | 6^{1}

Qualifying competition
4 | (Italy) Lucrezia Stefanini | 3 | 1
WC | (Czech Republic) Alena Kovačková | 6 | 6

==== Fifth qualifier ====
First round
5 | (Serbia) Nina Stojanović | 2 | 6 | 6
WC | (Czech Republic) Jana Kovačková | 6 | 3 | 3
(Bulgaria) Lia Karatancheva | 3 | 6 | 4
7 | (China) Gao Xinyu | 6 | 4 | 6

Qualifying competition
5 | (Serbia) Nina Stojanović | 3 | 0
7 | (China) Gao Xinyu | 6 | 6

==== Sixth qualifier ====
First round
6 | (Germany) Tamara Korpatsch | 2 | 6 | 1
(Czech Republic) Tereza Martincová | 6 | 4 | 6
WC | (Czech Republic) Denisa Hindová | 1 | 0
8 | (Japan) Mai Hontama | 6 | 6

Qualifying competition
(Czech Republic) Tereza Martincová | 4 | 0
8 | (Japan) Mai Hontama | 6 | 6
