= 2026 Cundinamarca Open =

- Date: 9–15 November
- Edition: 1st
- Category: WTA 125
- Draw: 32S / 8D
- Prize money: $115,000
- Surface: Clay
- Location: Sopó, Colombia
- Venue: Complejo Deportivo La Trinidad

Champions

Singles
- (Canada) Bianca Andreescu

Doubles
- (Slovenia) Veronika Erjavec / (Kazakhstan) Zhibek Kulambayeva
- Cundinamarca Open

The 2026 Cundinamarca Open, also known as DIRECTV Open presentado por Compesar, for sponsorship reasons, was a professional women's tennis tournament played on outdoor clay courts. It was the 1st edition of this WTA 125 tournament, which was part of the 2026 WTA 125 Circuit. It took place at the Complejo Deportivo La Trinidad in Sopó, Colombia, from 9 through 16 November 2026.

== Singles main draw entrants ==
=== Seeds ===
Country	Player	Rank^{†}	Seed
GER	Tatjana Maria	66	1
~~FRA~~	~~Léolia Jeanjean~~	~~91~~	~~2~~
CAN	Bianca Andreescu	109	3
AUT	Julia Grabher	112	4
CZE	Laura Samson	116	5
ESP	Marina Bassols Ribera	125	6
ESP	Leyre Romero Gormaz	131	7
ITA	Lucia Bronzetti	134	8

^{†} Ranking are as of 2 November 2026.

=== Other entrants ===
The following players received wildcards into the singles main draw :

- (Colombia) Antonella Esquivel Useche
- (Colombia) Yuliana Lizarazo
- (Colombia) Valentina Mediorreal Arias
- (United States) Julieta Pareja

The following players received entry from the qualifying draw :

- (Brazil) Carolina Alves
- (Colombia) María Herazo González
- (Slovenia) Dalila Jakupović
- (United States) Katrina Scott

The following player received entry as a lucky loser:

- (Colombia) María Torres Murcia

=== Withdrawals ===
Before the tournament

- (Spain) Jéssica Bouzas Maneiro → replaced by (Canada) Bianca Andreescu
- (France) Fiona Ferro → replaced by (France) Alice Tubello
- (United Kingdom) Francesca Jones → replaced by (France) Carole Monnet
- (United States) Elvina Kalieva → replaced by (Argentina) María Lourdes Carlé
- (France) Léolia Jeanjean → replaced by (Colombia) María Torres Murcia (LL)
- (Croatia) Petra Marčinko → replaced by (Slovenia) Polona Hercog
- (Ukraine) Oleksandra Oliynykova → replaced by (Belgium) Sofia Costoulas
- (Latvia) Darja Semeņistaja → replaced by (Slovenia) Tamara Zidanšek
- (Argentina) Solana Sierra → replaced by (Argentina) Luisina Giovannini
- (United States) Sloane Stephens → replaced by (United States) Varvara Lepchenko
- (Mexico) Renata Zarazúa → replaced by (Brazil) Laura Pigossi

=== Retirement ===
- (Spain) Marina Bassols Ribera (hip injury)

== Doubles main draw entrants ==
=== Seeds ===
Country	Player	Country	Player	Rank^{1}	Seed
SLO	Dalila Jakupović	SLO	Nika Radišić	137	1
USA	Rasheeda McAdoo	USA	Anna Rogers	207	2

- ^{1} Rankings as of 2 November 2026.

=== Other entrants ===
The following pair received a wildcard into the doubles main draw:

- (Colombia) Valentina Mediorreal Arias / (Colombia) María Paulina Pérez García

== Finals ==
=== Singles ===
- (Canada) Bianca Andreescu def. (United States) Elizabeth Mandlik 6–3, 6–3

=== Doubles ===
- (Slovenia) Veronika Erjavec / (Kazakhstan) Zhibek Kulambayeva def. (Czech Republic) Laura Samson / (Slovenia) Tamara Zidanšek, 5–7, 6–2, [14–12]
