= 2024 French Open =

2024 tennis tournament held in Paris, France

- Date: 26 May – 9 June 2024
- Edition: 123rd
- Category: Grand Slam
- Draw: 128S / 64D / 32X
- Prize money: €53,500,000
- Surface: Clay
- Location: Paris (XVI^{e}), France
- Venue: Roland Garros Stadium

Champions

Men's singles
- (Spain) Carlos Alcaraz

Women's singles
- (Poland) Iga Świątek

Men's doubles
- (El Salvador) Marcelo Arévalo / (Croatia) Mate Pavić

Women's doubles
- (United States) Coco Gauff / (Czech Republic) Kateřina Siniaková

Mixed doubles
- (Germany) Laura Siegemund / (France) Édouard Roger-Vasselin

Wheelchair men's singles
- (Japan) Tokito Oda

Wheelchair women's singles
- (Netherlands) Diede de Groot

Wheelchair quad singles
- (Israel) Guy Sasson

Wheelchair men's doubles
- (United Kingdom) Alfie Hewett / (United Kingdom) Gordon Reid

Wheelchair women's doubles
- (Netherlands) Diede de Groot / (Netherlands) Aniek van Koot

Wheelchair quad doubles
- (Netherlands) Sam Schröder / (Netherlands) Niels Vink

Boys' singles
- (United States) Kaylan Bigun

Girls' singles
- (Czech Republic) Tereza Valentová

Boys' doubles
- (Norway) Nicolai Budkov Kjær / (Austria) Joel Schwärzler

Girls' doubles
- (Slovakia) Renáta Jamrichová / (Czech Republic) Tereza Valentová

Wheelchair boys' singles
- (Austria) Maximilian Taucher

Wheelchair girls' singles
- (France) Ksénia Chasteau

Wheelchair boys' doubles
- (United Kingdom) Ruben Harris / (Austria) Maximilian Taucher

Wheelchair girls' doubles
- (France) Ksénia Chasteau / (United States) Maylee Phelps
- French Open

The 2024 French Open was a Grand Slam tennis tournament that was played on outdoor clay courts. It was held at the Stade Roland Garros in Paris, France, from 26 May to 9 June 2024, comprising singles, doubles and mixed doubles play. Junior and wheelchair tournaments were also scheduled.

It was the 123rd edition of the French Open and the second Grand Slam tournament of 2024. The main singles draws included 16 qualifiers for men and 16 for women out of 128 players respectively. The men's singles title was won by Carlos Alcaraz, who defeated Alexander Zverev in the final to lift his third major title. He also became the youngest male player to win a major title across three different surfaces. Iga Świątek successfully defended her women's singles title by defeating Jasmine Paolini in the final. It was her fifth major title and her third consecutive French Open trophy. By doing so, she recorded a 21-match winning streak at the French Open, which put her fourth in the match win streaks at the tournament. It would also be the final major for fourteen-time champion Rafael Nadal.

== Tournament ==
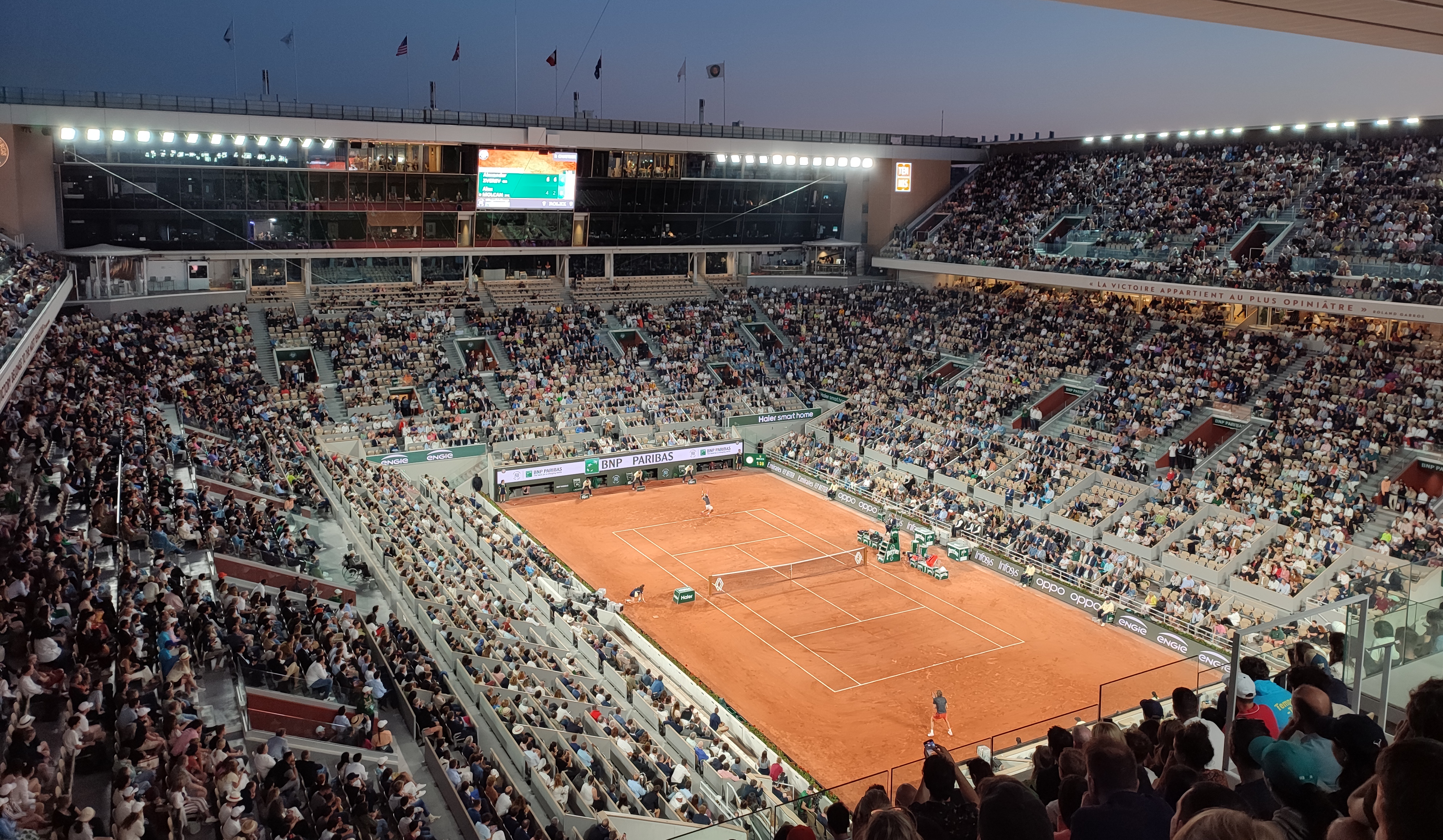
Court Philippe Chatrier in 2023, where the finals of the French Open take place.

The 2024 French Open was the 123rd edition of the French Open and was held at Stade Roland Garros in Paris.

The tournament was run by the International Tennis Federation (ITF) and was part of the 2024 ATP Tour and the 2024 WTA Tour calendars under the Grand Slam tournament category. The tournament consisted of both men's and women's singles and doubles draws.

There were singles and doubles events for both boys and girls (players under 18), which will be part of the Grade A category of tournaments, and singles and doubles events for men's and women's wheelchair tennis players under the Grand Slam category. The tournament was played on clay courts and took place over a series of 18 courts, including the three main showcourts, Court Philippe-Chatrier, Court Suzanne-Lenglen and Court Simonne-Mathieu.

== Singles players ==
- Men's singles

Men's singles players
Champion		Runner-up	
(Spain) Carlos Alcaraz [3]		(Germany) Alexander Zverev [4]	
Semifinals out
(Norway) Casper Ruud [7]		(Italy) Jannik Sinner [2]	
Quarterfinals out
(Serbia) Novak Djokovic [1]	(Australia) Alex de Minaur [11]	(Greece) Stefanos Tsitsipas [9]	(Bulgaria) Grigor Dimitrov [10]
4th round out
(Argentina) Francisco Cerúndolo [23]	(United States) Taylor Fritz [12]	(Denmark) Holger Rune [13]	Daniil Medvedev [5]
(Italy) Matteo Arnaldi	(Canada) Félix Auger-Aliassime [21]	(Poland) Hubert Hurkacz [8]	(France) Corentin Moutet
3rd round out
(Italy) Lorenzo Musetti [30]	(United States) Tommy Paul [14]	(Australia) Thanasi Kokkinakis	(Argentina) Tomás Martín Etcheverry [28]
(Netherlands) Tallon Griekspoor [26]	(Slovakia) Jozef Kovalík (LL)	(Germany) Jan-Lennard Struff	(Czech Republic) Tomáš Macháč
Andrey Rublev [6]	(China) Zhang Zhizhen	(United States) Ben Shelton [15]	(United States) Sebastian Korda [27]
(Canada) Denis Shapovalov (PR)	(Belgium) Zizou Bergs (Q)	(Austria) Sebastian Ofner	Pavel Kotov
2nd round out
(Spain) Roberto Carballés Baena	(France) Gaël Monfils	(Austria) Filip Misolic (Q)	(Italy) Fabio Fognini
(Serbia) Dušan Lajović	(Italy) Giulio Zeppieri (Q)	(France) Arthur Rinderknech	(Spain) Alejandro Davidovich Fokina
(Belgium) David Goffin	(Italy) Luciano Darderi	Karen Khachanov [18]	(Italy) Flavio Cobolli
(Spain) Jaume Munar	(Kazakhstan) Alexander Bublik [19]	(Argentina) Mariano Navone [31]	(Serbia) Miomir Kecmanović
(Spain) Pedro Martínez	(France) Alexandre Müller (WC)	(Italy) Lorenzo Sonego	(Germany) Daniel Altmaier
(Japan) Kei Nishikori (PR)	(Germany) Henri Squire (Q)	(South Korea) Kwon Soon-woo (PR)	(Netherlands) Jesper de Jong (Q)
(United States) Brandon Nakashima	(United States) Frances Tiafoe [25]	(Germany) Maximilian Marterer	(Hungary) Fábián Marozsán
(Kazakhstan) Alexander Shevchenko	(Argentina) Sebastián Báez [20]	(Switzerland) Stan Wawrinka	(France) Richard Gasquet (WC)
1st round out
(France) Pierre-Hugues Herbert (WC)	(France) Constant Lestienne	(Brazil) Thiago Seyboth Wild	(Colombia) Daniel Elahi Galán
(Germany) Yannick Hanfmann	(Finland) Otto Virtanen (LL)	(Netherlands) Botic van de Zandschulp	(Argentina) Pedro Cachín
(Argentina) Federico Coria	Roman Safiullin	(Australia) Alexei Popyrin	(France) Adrian Mannarino [22]
(France) Arthur Cazaux	(Australia) Adam Walton (WC)	(Monaco) Valentin Vacherot (Q)	(Brazil) Felipe Meligeni Alves (Q)
(Spain) Rafael Nadal (PR)	(France) Giovanni Mpetshi Perricard (WC)	(Australia) Rinky Hijikata	(United States) Mackenzie McDonald
(India) Sumit Nagal	(United States) Marcos Giron	(Serbia) Hamad Medjedovic (Q)	(United Kingdom) Dan Evans
(United States) Alex Michelsen	(Spain) Roberto Bautista Agut	(Argentina) Román Andrés Burruchaga (Q)	(France) Grégoire Barrère (Q)
(Spain) Pablo Carreño Busta (PR)	(Portugal) Nuno Borges	(Brazil) Thiago Monteiro (Q)	(Germany) Dominik Koepfer
(Japan) Taro Daniel	(Argentina) Thiago Agustín Tirante	(Italy) Luca Nardi	(France) Arthur Fils [29]
(France) Ugo Humbert [17]	(Australia) Aleksandar Vukic	(Serbia) Laslo Djere	(Hungary) Márton Fucsovics
(France) Hugo Gaston	(Canada) Gabriel Diallo (Q)	(Australia) Max Purcell	(Japan) Yoshihito Nishioka
(France) Harold Mayot (WC)	(Finland) Emil Ruusuvuori	(United Kingdom) Jack Draper	(United States) J. J. Wolf (LL)
(Japan) Shintaro Mochizuki (Q)	(United States) Nicolas Moreno de Alboran (WC)	(France) Luca Van Assche	(Italy) Mattia Bellucci (Q)
(Chile) Alejandro Tabilo [24]	(Australia) Jordan Thompson	(Kazakhstan) Mikhail Kukushkin (Q)	(United States) Aleksandar Kovacevic
(Chile) Nicolás Jarry [16]	Aslan Karatsev	(France) Térence Atmane (WC)	(Brazil) Gustavo Heide (Q)
(United Kingdom) Cameron Norrie [32]	(United Kingdom) Andy Murray	(Croatia) Borna Ćorić	(United States) Christopher Eubanks

- Women's singles

Women's singles players
Champion		Runner-up	
(Poland) Iga Świątek [1]		(Italy) Jasmine Paolini [12]	
Semifinals out
(United States) Coco Gauff [3]		Mirra Andreeva	
Quarterfinals out
(Czech Republic) Markéta Vondroušová [5]	(Tunisia) Ons Jabeur [8]	(Kazakhstan) Elena Rybakina [4]	Aryna Sabalenka [2]
4th round out
Anastasia Potapova	(Serbia) Olga Danilović (Q)	(Italy) Elisabetta Cocciaretto	(Denmark) Clara Tauson
Elina Avanesyan	(Ukraine) Elina Svitolina [15]	(France) Varvara Gracheva	(United States) Emma Navarro [22]
3rd round out
(Czech Republic) Marie Bouzková	(China) Wang Xinyu	(Croatia) Donna Vekić	(France) Chloé Paquet (WC)
(Ukraine) Dayana Yastremska [30]	Liudmila Samsonova [17]	(United States) Sofia Kenin	(Canada) Leylah Fernandez [31]
(China) Zheng Qinwen [7]	(Canada) Bianca Andreescu (PR)	(Romania) Ana Bogdan	(Belgium) Elise Mertens [25]
(Romania) Irina-Camelia Begu (PR)	(United States) Peyton Stearns	(United States) Madison Keys [14]	(Spain) Paula Badosa
2nd round out
(Japan) Naomi Osaka (PR)	(Croatia) Jana Fett (LL)	(Switzerland) Viktorija Golubic	(Bulgaria) Viktoriya Tomova
(United States) Danielle Collins [11]	(Ukraine) Marta Kostyuk [18]	(Czech Republic) Kateřina Siniaková [32]	(United States) Katie Volynets (Q)
(Slovenia) Tamara Zidanšek (Q)	(China) Wang Yafan	(United States) Amanda Anisimova (PR)	(Spain) Cristina Bucșa
(Latvia) Jeļena Ostapenko [9]	(France) Caroline Garcia [21]	(China) Wang Xiyu	(Colombia) Camila Osorio
(Germany) Tamara Korpatsch	Anna Blinkova	Anna Kalinskaya [23]	(United States) Hailey Baptiste (LL)
(France) Diane Parry	Anastasia Pavlyuchenkova [20]	(Croatia) Petra Martić	(Netherlands) Arantxa Rus
(United States) Bernarda Pera	(Czech Republic) Linda Nosková [27]	Victoria Azarenka [19]	Daria Kasatkina [10]
(Egypt) Mayar Sherif	(Italy) Sara Errani (Q)	(Kazakhstan) Yulia Putintseva	(Japan) Moyuka Uchijima (Q)
1st round out
(France) Léolia Jeanjean (Q)	(Italy) Lucia Bronzetti	(Spain) Jéssica Bouzas Maneiro	Veronika Kudermetova [29]
(Czech Republic) Barbora Krejčíková [24]	Kamilla Rakhimova	(Germany) Jule Niemeier (Q)	Ekaterina Alexandrova [16]
(United States) Caroline Dolehide	(Italy) Martina Trevisan	(Ukraine) Lesia Tsurenko	(Brazil) Laura Pigossi (Q)
(Hungary) Dalma Gálfi (LL)	Diana Shnaider	(Serbia) Aleksandra Krunić (PR)	(Spain) Rebeka Masarova
Julia Avdeeva (Q)	(Belgium) Alison Van Uytvanck (PR)	Maria Timofeeva	(Australia) Ajla Tomljanović (WC)
(Poland) Magda Linette	(Slovakia) Rebecca Šramková (Q)	(Ukraine) Yuliia Starodubtseva (Q)	(Brazil) Beatriz Haddad Maia [13]
(Romania) Jaqueline Cristian	(Germany) Tatjana Maria	(Germany) Laura Siegemund	(Germany) Eva Lys (Q)
(France) Jessika Ponchet (WC)	(China) Bai Zhuoxuan	(Ukraine) Anhelina Kalinina	(United States) Sachia Vickery (WC)
(France) Alizé Cornet (WC)	(United States) Ashlyn Krueger	(China) Zhu Lin	(Romania) Sorana Cîrstea [28]
(France) Clara Burel	(Spain) Sara Sorribes Tormo	(United States) Kayla Day	(Australia) Daria Saville (PR)
(Czech Republic) Karolína Plíšková	(France) Fiona Ferro (WC)	(France) Elsa Jacquemot (WC)	(Hungary) Panna Udvardy (LL)
(Argentina) María Lourdes Carlé	(France) Kristina Mladenovic (WC)	(Germany) Angelique Kerber (PR)	(Belgium) Greet Minnen
(Greece) Maria Sakkari [6]	(Japan) Nao Hibino	(Argentina) Julia Riera (Q)	(United Kingdom) Harriet Dart
(Argentina) Nadia Podoroska	(United States) Emina Bektas	(Croatia) Lucija Ćirić Bagarić (Q)	(Poland) Magdalena Fręch
(Mexico) Renata Zarazúa	(China) Yuan Yue	(Slovakia) Anna Karolína Schmiedlová	(Turkey) Zeynep Sönmez (Q)
(United Kingdom) Katie Boulter [26]	(United States) Sloane Stephens	(Spain) Irene Burillo Escorihuela (Q)	Erika Andreeva

== Events ==
=== Men's singles ===
- (Spain) Carlos Alcaraz defeated (Germany) Alexander Zverev 6–3, 2–6, 5–7, 6–1, 6–2

The men's singles event began on 26 May with the first of seven total rounds. Thirty-two players were seeded. Of those seeded players, six were defeated in the first round, notably No. 16 Nicolás Jarry and No. 17 Ugo Humbert. Karen Khachanov, Alexander Bublik and Sebastián Báez were the highest of the five seeded players to exit in the second round, and a further seven seeded players were defeated in the third round including No. 6 Andrey Rublev, No. 14 Tommy Paul and No. 15 Ben Shelton. With his win over Lorenzo Musetti in the third round, Novak Djokovic equaled Roger Federer's all-time record of 369 match wins at the majors. That match also marked the latest finish in tournament history, ending at 3:07 a.m. local time. Daniil Medvedev, Hubert Hurkacz and Taylor Fritz were the highest of the seven seeded players who were defeated in the Round of 16.

Defending champion Novak Djokovic withdrew from the quarterfinals due to a knee injury. As a result of this Casper Ruud received a walkover into the semifinals. His withdrawal guaranteed a first-time champion. It also marked the first French Open final without a member of the Big Three since 2004. Due to Djokovic's withdrawal, Jannik Sinner attained the ATP World No. 1 singles ranking at the end of the tournament, becoming the first Italian singles player, male or female, to claim the top spot. In the quarterfinals, Sinner defeated tenth seed Grigor Dimitrov in straight sets, third seed Carlos Alcaraz won over ninth seed Stefanos Tsitsipas in a rematch of the previous year's quarterfinal, and fourth seed Alexander Zverev reached the semifinals with a win over 11th seed Alex de Minaur.

The first semifinal was played between second seed Sinner and third seed Alcaraz. The Italian got off to a strong start after he broke Alcaraz's serve in the first game of the match to win four consecutive games. Even though, Alcaraz countered this by breaking Sinner's serve, the second seed won the first set, 6–2. In the second set, the Italian once again broke Alcaraz's opening serve, but the Spaniard won four consecutive games before taking the second set 6–3 in favor. In the third set, Alcaraz got the lead after breaking Sinner's serve, but No. 2 broke his serve twice to take the third set 6–3. In the fourth set, both players continued to hold their serves until Alcaraz broke Sinner's serve in the last game of the set to win the set and to level the match at 2–2. The Spaniard won the first three games of the deciding set. Alcaraz won the match in five sets. He also became the youngest player to reach a Grand Slam singles final on 3 different surfaces. In the second semifinal, the fourth seed, Zverev played against two times French Open finalist, Casper Ruud. Ruud got an early start after Zverev's serve, winning three games in a row, before taking the first set, 6–2. The German broke the seventh seed's serve twice in the second set to win it in his favor, 6–2. At this point in the match, Ruud started showing signs of his fatigue due to a stomach illness. Zverev won the 3rd set by 6–4 after saving a break point in the 10th game. Zverev won the fourth set and the match by breaking Ruud's serve in the 1st and 7th game of the set.

In the final, Alcaraz had a strong start after he broke Zverev's serve in the first game of the match, however, Zverev fought back and broke Alcaraz's serve in the next game. Alcaraz went on to win the first set after he broke the fourth seed's serve in the 5th and 9th game. Zverev dominated in the second set, he broke Alcaraz's serve twice, in the 5th and 7th game of the set, winning four games consecutively. In the third set, coming from behind Zverev fought off a last game challenge from the Spaniard and won the set by 7–5 in his favor after saving a break point in the 12th game. Alcaraz bounced back in the 4th set, he won the first games of the set, breaking Zverev's serve twice, eventually winning the fourth set, 6–1 after saving three break points in the final game of the set. In the deciding set, Alcaraz broke the German player's serve twice to win the set, match and the tournament. It was his third major title. Alcaraz became the youngest player to win a major title on three different surfaces, having already won the 2022 US Open on hardcourts and 2023 Wimbledon Championships on grass.

=== Women's singles ===
- (Poland) Iga Świątek defeated (Italy) Jasmine Paolini, 6–2, 6–1

The women's singles event began on 26 May with the first of seven total rounds. Thirty-two players were seeded. Seven seeded players lost in the first round, notably No. 6 Maria Sakkari, No. 13 Beatriz Haddad Maia, and No. 16 Ekaterina Alexandrova, and 10 more fell in the second round, among them No. 9 and former champion Jeļena Ostapenko, No. 10 Daria Kasatkina, and No. 11 Danielle Collins. In a second round match, No. 1 seeded Iga Świątek defeated former world No. 1 Naomi Osaka after saving a match point, leading some publications to call the match an "instant classic". Six seeded players lost in the third round, including No. 7 Zheng Qinwen. Świątek's defeat of Anastasia Potapova in the fourth round, which took just 40 minutes, was the shortest match played at Roland Garros since the 1988 final between Steffi Graf and Natasha Zvereva; the 10 points won by Potapova are the fewest on record at the French Open. No. 15 Elina Svitolina and No. 22 Emma Navarro were the only two seeded players to lose their matches in the fourth round.

Mirra Andreeva was the only unseeded player to reach the quarterfinals. In the quarterfinals, third seed Coco Gauff won against eight seed Ons Jabeur, Defending champion Iga Świątek defeated fifth seed Markéta Vondroušová in straight sets while only losing two games. No. 2 seed Aryna Sabalenka was upset by Andreeva, who won after losing the first set. No. 12 Jasmine Paolini defeated fourth seed Elena Rybakina in three sets. In the first semifinal, Świątek met Gauff. Świątek started off strong by breaking Gauff's serve in the first game of the match. First seed would break American's serve once more to win the first set, 6–2. In the fourth game of the second set, Gauff broke Świątek's serve for first time in the match, but the Polish player broke back in the next game, went on to win three consecutive games. Świątek won the match, 6–2, 6–4 to reach her reach third straight French Open final. She also became the third player since 2000 to make three consecutive finals at the event, after Justine Henin (2005–2007) and Maria Sharapova (2012–2014). In the second semifinal match, Jasmine Paolini played against Mirra Andreeva. Paolini was first to break the serve when she won the second service game of Andreeva. Italian player won the first set, 6–3. No. 12 broke Andreeva's serve in the fifth game of the second set. Paolini won four consecutive games to defeat Andreeva, 6–4, 6–1 and reached her maiden major final. Paolini became the third Italian woman to reach the French Open final, after Francesca Schiavone (2010, 2011) and Sara Errani (2012).

In the final match, Jasmine Paolini got an early lead after she broke Swiątek's serve in the third game of the first set to lead the set by 2–1. Świątek bounced back in the game by breaking Italian serve. Światek won four consecutive games and broke Paolini's serve thrice back to back to win the first set by 6–2 in her favor. Światek carried her strong moment into the second set as she broke No. 11's serve twice in a row and won the first five games of the set (9 consecutive games in total). Italian was finally able to hold her serve in the penultimate game of the match. The defending champion won the set 6–1 to win her third consecutive and fourth overall French Open title. Świątek only dropped one set en route to the title (also against Osaka) and became the third woman in the Open Era to win three consecutive French Open titles, after Monica Seles in 1992 and Justine Henin in 2007. Additionally, Świątek became only the second woman to win the Madrid Open, the Italian Open and the French Open in the same season, after Serena Williams in 2013. She became only the third player (and second woman) in the Open Era to win all of their first five Major finals, after Seles and Roger Federer.

=== Men's doubles ===
- (El Salvador) Marcelo Arévalo / (Croatia) Mate Pavić defeated (Italy) Simone Bolelli / (Italy) Andrea Vavassori, 7–5, 6–3

The men's doubles event were scheduled to begin on 28 May with the first of six total rounds. Sixteen teams were seeded. Bad weather conditions led to an interruption in the schedule, resulting in a postponement of the doubles event, which commenced on May 29. Shortly after play began, a subsequent downpour caused additional delays, and the continuation of the doubles event has been rescheduled for May 31 (after rain on May 30). In the first round, four seeded pairs lost; the highest seeded of them was No. 5 Santiago González/Édouard Roger-Vasselin. Three seeded teams lost in the second round including the defending champions and No. 4 seed, Ivan Dodig and Austin Krajicek. In Third round, further three seeded teams lost, notably sixth-seed Kevin Krawietz/Tim Pütz.

In the quarterfinals, the top-seeded pair of Marcel Granollers and Horacio Zeballos defeated Tomáš Macháč and Zhang Zhizhen in straight sets in just 65 minutes. 11th seeds Simone Bolelli and Andrea Vavassori upset third seeds Rajeev Ram and Joe Salisbury. Second seeds Rohan Bopanna and Matthew Ebden defeated 10th seeds and previous year's finalists Sander Gillé and Joran Vliegen. Ninth seeds Marcelo Arévalo and Mate Pavić defeated Stefanos and Petros Tsitsipas in straight sets. In the semifinals, Bolelli and Vavassori defeated Bopanna and Ebden in three sets, reaching their second consecutive grand slam final, while Arévalo and Pavić ousted top seeds Granollers and Zeballos. Marcelo Arévalo and Mate Pavić defeated Simone Bolelli and Andrea Vavassori in the final in straight sets to win their first major title as a pair. It was Arévalo's second major men's doubles title and Pavić's fourth. Pavić completed a career Golden Slam with the win, having previously won the three other major championships and an Olympic gold medal.

=== Women's doubles ===
- (United States) Coco Gauff / (Czech Republic) Kateřina Siniaková defeated (Italy) Sara Errani / (Italy) Jasmine Paolini 7–6^{(7–5)}, 6–3

The women's doubles event were scheduled to begin on 28 May with the first of six total rounds. Sixteen teams were seeded. Bad weather conditions led to an interruption in the schedule, resulting in a postponement of the doubles event, which commenced on May 29. Shortly after play began, a subsequent downpour caused additional delays, and the continuation of the doubles event has been rescheduled for May 31 (after further rain on May 30). All of the 15 seeded teams in the draw advanced into the second round. The second round saw the loss of five seeded pairs including the first seeds, Hsieh Su-wei (also the defending champion) and Elise Mertens. Further six pairs fell in the third round; highest of them being No. 2 Nicole Melichar-Martinez and Ellen Perez.

Four seeded pairs qualified for the quarterfinals, alongside four unseeded pairs. In the quarterfinals, unseeded pair of Marta Kostyuk and Elena-Gabriela Ruse received a walkover after their opponent Mirra Andreeva and Vera Zvonareva decided to withdraw due to Andreeva's schedule. Fifth seeds Coco Gauff and Kateřina Siniaková defeated 16th seeds Miyu Kato and Nadiia Kichenok in straight sets while only losing two games. No. 8 Caroline Dolehide and Desirae Krawczyk beat Giuliana Olmos and Alexandra Panova. No. 11 Jasmine Paolini and Sara Errani had a straight-set win against Emma Navarro and Diana Shnaider. In the semifinals, Paolini and Errani fought back from a set down to defeat the unseeded pair of Kostyuk and Ruse, Like Errani and Paolini, the No. 5 seeds Gauff and Siniaková also rallied from a set down to defeat Dolehide and Krawczyk in three sets. Coco Gauff and Kateřina Siniaková defeated Sara Errani and Jasmine Paolini in the final in straight sets to win their first grand slam title as a pair. It was Gauff's first major women's doubles title and Siniaková's eighth.

=== Mixed doubles ===
- (Germany) Laura Siegemund / (France) Édouard Roger-Vasselin defeated (United States) Desirae Krawczyk / (United Kingdom) Neal Skupski, 6–4, 7–5

The mixed doubles event were scheduled to begin on 29 May with the first of five total rounds. Eight teams were seeded. Bad weather conditions led to an interruption in the schedule, resulting in a postponement of the doubles event, which commenced on May 31. Two seeded pair were knocked out in the opening round: No. 5 pair of Vera Zvonareva/Sander Gillé and No. 8 seed Bethanie Mattek-Sands/Austin Krajicek. All five remaining seeds won their second round matches and advanced forward into the quarterfinals. In quarterfinals, the top seeds Ellen Perez and Matthew Ebden lost to No. 7 pair of Hsieh Su-wei and Jan Zieliński, while, fourth seeds Desirae Krawczyk and Neal Skupski won against the unseeded pair of Zhang Shuai and Marcelo Arévalo in straight sets. Unseeded pair Ulrikke Eikeri and Máximo González knocked out the defending champions, Miyu Kato and Tim Pütz. No. 6 pair of Erin Routliffe and Michael Venus lost to second seeds, Laura Siegemund and Édouard Roger-Vasselin. In the semifinals, Hsieh and Zieliński were defeated by Krawczyk and Skupski, while Eikeri and González were defeated by Siegemund and Roger-Vasselin. In the final, Laura Siegemund and Édouard Roger-Vasselin defeated Desirae Krawczyk and Neal Skupski to win their first major title as a pair. It was the second Grand Slam mixed doubles title for Siegemund and the first for Roger-Vasselin. Roger-Vasselin became the first French man to win the mixed doubles event since Fabrice Santoro in 2005.

=== Wheelchair men's singles ===
- (Japan) Tokito Oda defeated (Argentina) Gustavo Fernández, 7–5, 6–3

The wheelchair men's singles tournament began on 4 June with the Round of 16. The field was composed of 16 player with 4 seeded players. Fourth seed Martín de la Puente lost in the first round. All of the quarterfinal matches were decided in straight sets, with top three seeds advancing. In the semifinals, No. 1 Alfie Hewett lost in three sets to Gustavo Fernández, while second seed Tokito Oda defeated unseeded Takuya Miki. Oda defended his title by winning the final against Fernández in straight sets.

=== Wheelchair women's singles ===
- (Netherlands) Diede de Groot defeated (China) Zhu Zhenzhen, 4–6, 6–2, 6–3

The wheelchair women's singles tournament began on 4 June with the Round of 16. The field was composed of 16 player with 4 seeded players. Third seed Jiske Griffioen was knocked in the first round. Second seed Yui Kamiji lost in the quarterfinals. In the semifinals, No. 4 Aniek van Koot lost to No. 1 Diede de Groot in straight sets and Zhu Zhenzhen won her match against Momoko Ohtani that decided in the super tiebreaker. Three-time defending champion Diede de Groot defeated Zhu Zhenzhen in the final to win her 14th consecutive grand slam title. De Groot completed the fivefold career Grand Slam with the win. This was also her 22nd major singles title, surpassing the record held by Esther Vergeer.

=== Wheelchair quad singles ===
- (Israel) Guy Sasson defeated (Netherlands) Sam Schröder, 6–2, 3–6, 7–6^{(10–7)}

The wheelchair quad singles tournament began on 5 June with the quarterfinal round. The field was composed of eight players; two-time defending champion Niels Vink and three-time finalist Sam Schröder received the top two seeds and the other six players were unseeded. In the opening three players including two seeds won their matches in straight sets. In the semifinals, first seed Vink lost to Guy Sasson in straight sets, while Sam Schröder won also won his match against Donald Ramphadi in straight sets. In the final, Sasson defeated Schröder in the super tiebreaker to win his first ever grand slam title and also first Israeli player to do so.

=== Wheelchair men's doubles ===
- (United Kingdom) Alfie Hewett / (United Kingdom) Gordon Reid defeated (Japan) Takuya Miki / (Japan) Tokito Oda, 6–1, 6–4

The wheelchair men's doubles competition featured the same 16 players that contested the singles event. Both the seeded teams won their both the quarterfinals, and semifinals. No. 1 seeds Alfie Hewett and Gordon Reid defeated second seeds Takuya Miki and Tokito Oda in straight sets to win their fifth consecutive French Open title.

=== Wheelchair women's doubles ===
- (Netherlands) Diede de Groot / (Netherlands) Aniek van Koot defeated (Japan) Yui Kamiji / (South Africa) Kgothatso Montjane, 6–7^{(6–8)}, 7–6^{(7–2)}, [10–4]

As with the men's competition, the wheelchair women's doubles event featured the same 16 players as in the singles event. Two of the eight pairs were seeded: defending champions Yui Kamiji and Kgothatso Montjane received the top seed, and the second seed went to Diede de Groot and Aniek van Koot. Both these seeds won their quarterfinal and semifinal matches. In the final, de Groot and van Koot defeated defending champions Kamiji and Montjane.

=== Wheelchair quad doubles ===
- (Netherlands) Sam Schröder / (Netherlands) Niels Vink defeated (United Kingdom) Andy Lapthorne / (Israel) Guy Sasson, 7–6^{(11–9)}, 6–1

The wheelchair quad doubles tournament began on 7 June with the semifinal round. The field was composed of four pairs, consisting of eight players that played the singles event. Both the seeds won their semifinal matches. Sam Schröder and Niels Vink won the title by defeating Andy Lapthorne and Guy Sasson in the final.

=== Boys' singles ===
- (United States) Kaylan Bigun defeated (Poland) Tomasz Berkieta, 4–6, 6–3, 6–3

Of the sixteen seeded players, only four made it through the first three rounds and into the quarterfinals: No. 1 Rei Sakamoto, No. 2 Joel Schwärzler, No. 5 Kaylan Bigun and No. 10 Petr Brunclík. Sakamoto and Brunclík lost their quarterfinal matches. In the semifinals, unseeded Tomasz Berkieta won against unseeded Lorenzo Carboni, while fifth seed Bigun defeated second seed Schwärzler after losing the first set. in the final, Bigun defeated Berkieta in three sets to claim his first junior Grand Slam title.

=== Girls' singles ===
- (Czech Republic) Tereza Valentová defeated (Czech Republic) Laura Samson, 6–3, 7–6^{(7–0)}

Of the sixteen seeded players, only five made it through the first three rounds and into the quarterfinals: No. 1 Renáta Jamrichová, No. 3 Laura Samson, No. 4 Tyra Caterina Grant, No. 10 Iva Jovic and No. 12 Tereza Valentová. Valentová knocked out the No. 1 seed in the quarterfinals. Valentová also won her semifinal against Grant. Third seed Samson defeated unseeded Kristina Penickova to reach the final. The all-Czech championship match was won by Tereza Valentová in straight sets.

=== Boys' doubles ===
- (Norway) Nicolai Budkov Kjær / (Austria) Joel Schwärzler defeated (Italy) Federico Cinà / (Japan) Rei Sakamoto 6–4, 7–6^{(7–3)}

Of the four pairs that qualified for the semifinals, two were seeded. Six seeded pairs of the original eight made it past the second round. However, two seeded pair withdrew from their quarterfinal matches, No. 6 Viktor Frydrych/Mees Röttgering and No. 7 Maxwell Exsted/Cooper Woestendick. The only seeded pair to lose their quarterfinal match was No. 3 Thomas Faurel/Luca Preda. Both the top seeds won their semifinals. The final, contested between two top seeds, No. 1 Nicolai Budkov Kjær/Joel Schwärzler and No. 2 Federico Cinà/Rei Sakamoto and was won by the former in straight sets.

=== Girls' doubles ===
- (Slovakia) Renáta Jamrichová / (Czech Republic) Tereza Valentová defeated (United States) Tyra Caterina Grant / (United States) Iva Jovic, 6–4, 6–4

Of the eight pairs that were seeded at the start of the tournament, four qualified for the semifinal round, including the top three pairs and fifth seeded pair of Emerson Jones and Vittoria Paganetti. In the semifinals, top seeds Alena Kovačková and Laura Samson were knocked out by the all-American fourth seededed team of Tyra Caterina Grant and Iva Jovic, while the fifth seeded pair was defeated by the third seeded pair of Renáta Jamrichová and Tereza Valentová. The final was won by Jamrichová and Valentová in straight sets.

=== Wheelchair boys' singles ===
- (Austria) Maximilian Taucher def. (Netherlands) Ivar van Rijt, 2–6, 6–4, 7–6^{(10–8)}

=== Wheelchair girls' singles ===
- (France) Ksénia Chasteau def. (United States) Maylee Phelps, 6–2, 6–3

=== Wheelchair boys' doubles ===
- (United Kingdom) Ruben Harris / (Austria) Maximilian Taucher def. (Australia) Yassin Hill / (Netherlands) Ivar van Rijt, 7–5, 6–4

=== Wheelchair girls' doubles ===
- (France) Ksénia Chasteau / (United States) Maylee Phelps def. (Brazil) Vitória Miranda / (Japan) Yuma Takamuro, 3–6, 6–0, [18–16]

== Champions ==
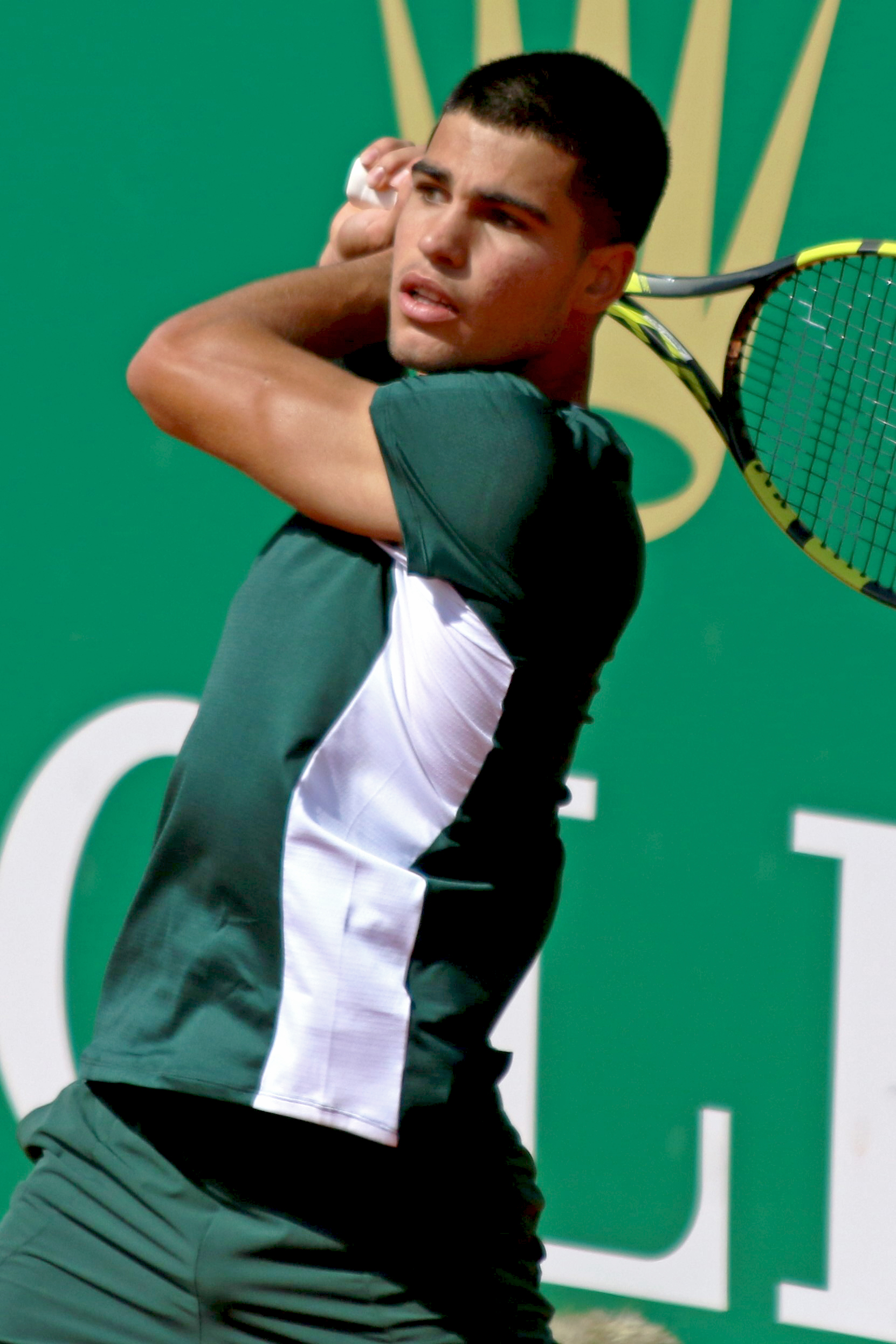
Carlos Alcaraz, the men's singles champion. It was his third major title.

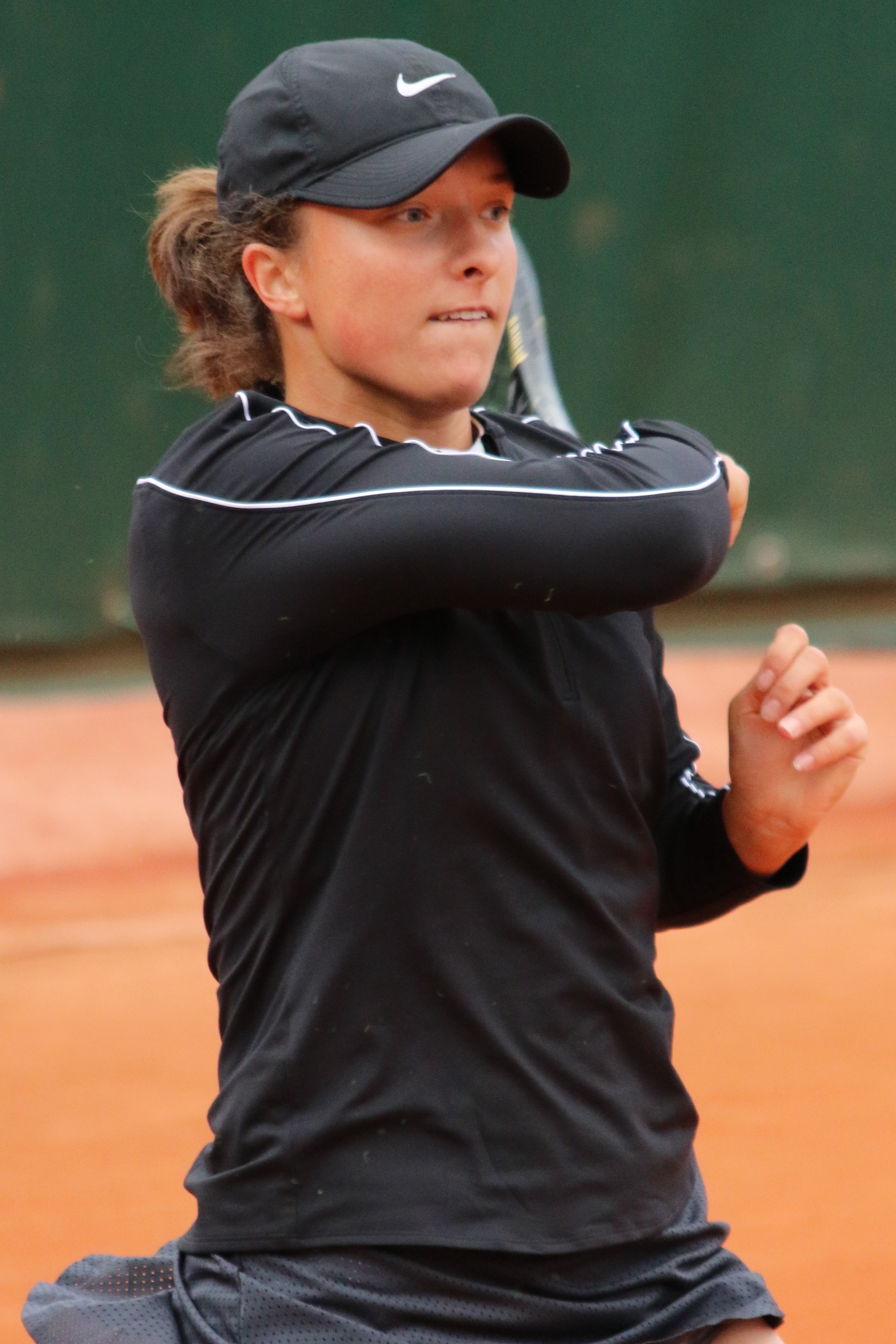
Iga Świątek, the women's singles champion. It was her fifth major title and her fourth at the French Open.

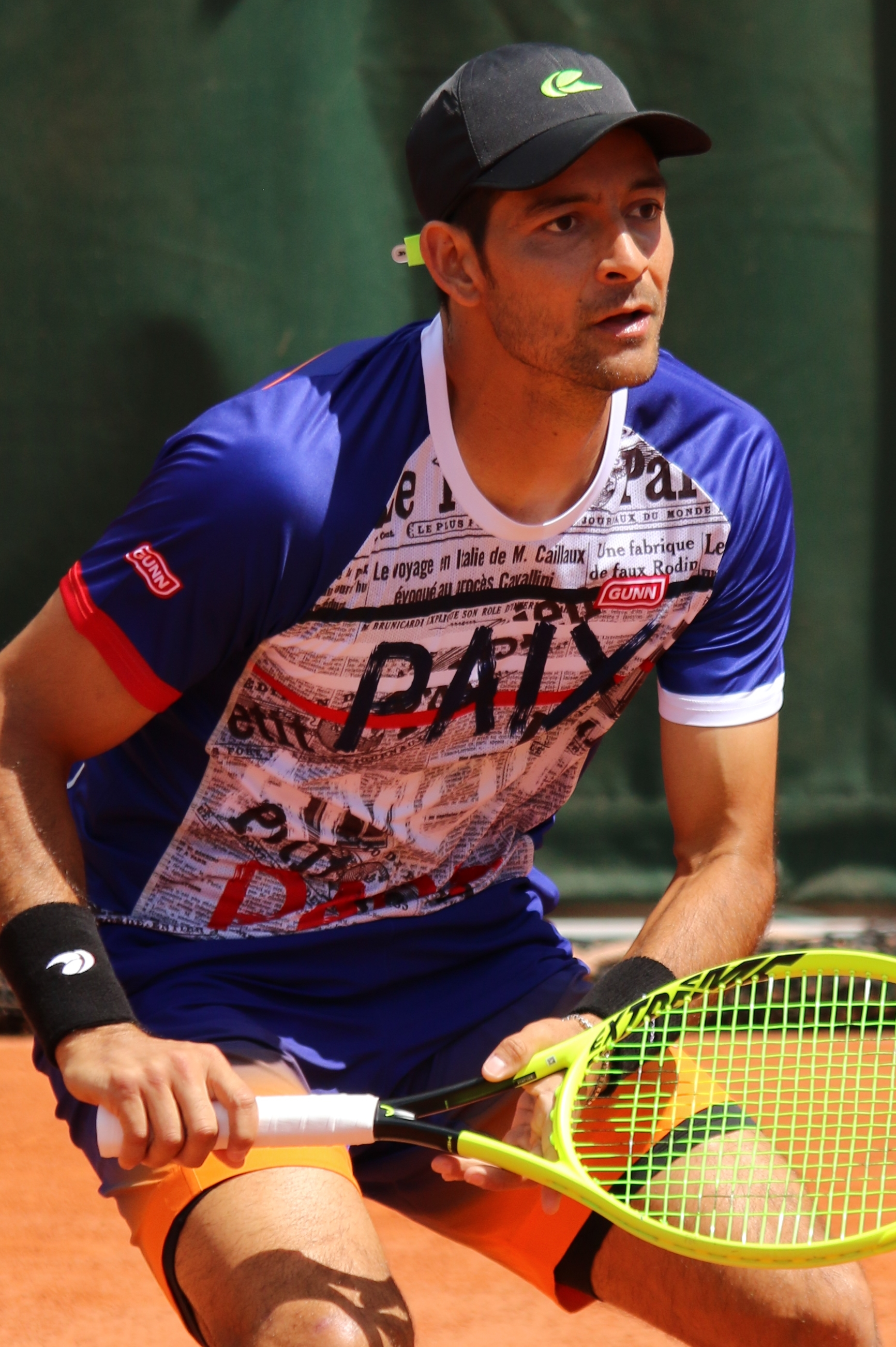
Marcelo Arévalo was part of the winning men's doubles team. It was his second major title.

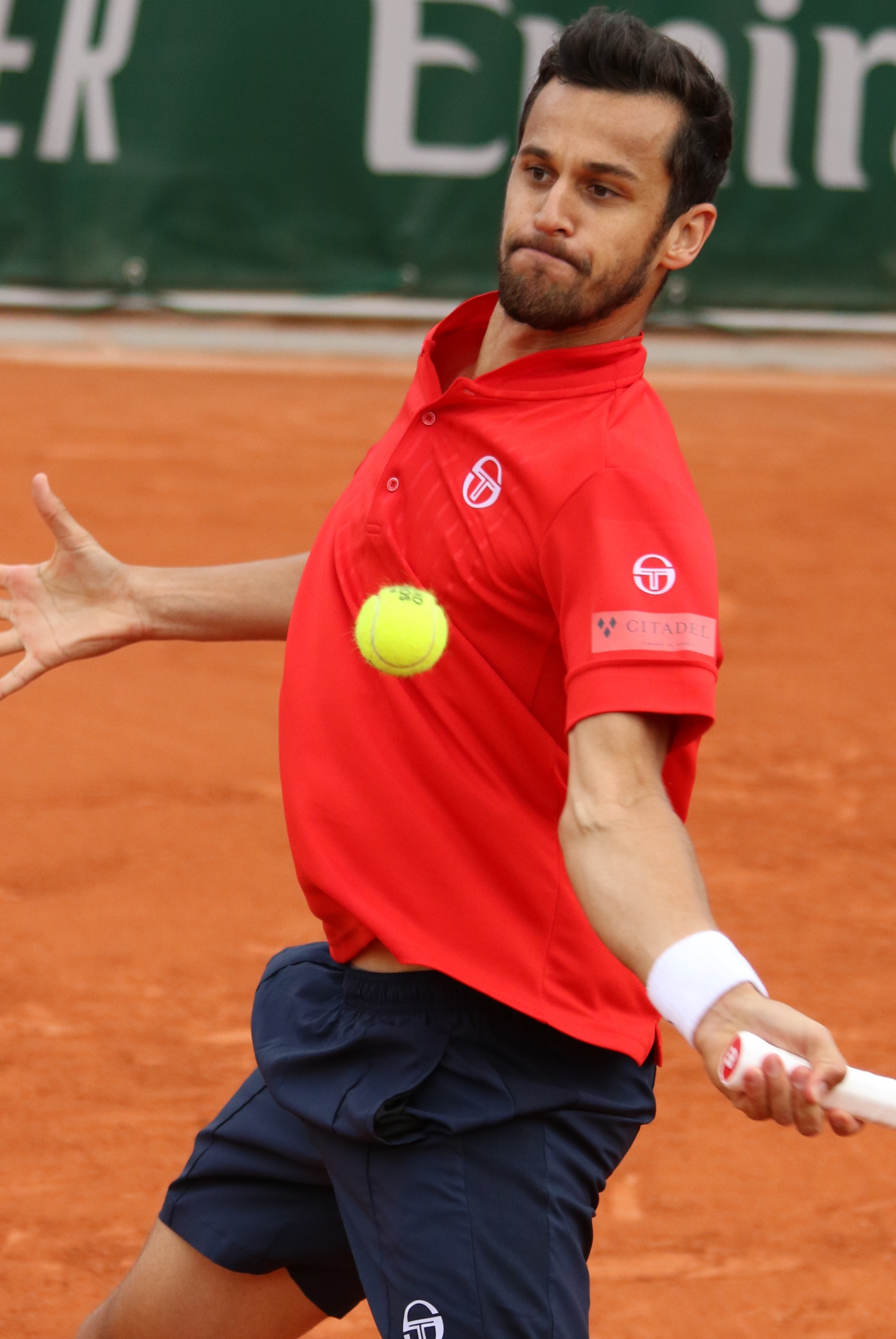
Mate Pavić was part of the winning men's doubles team. It was his fourth major doubles title.

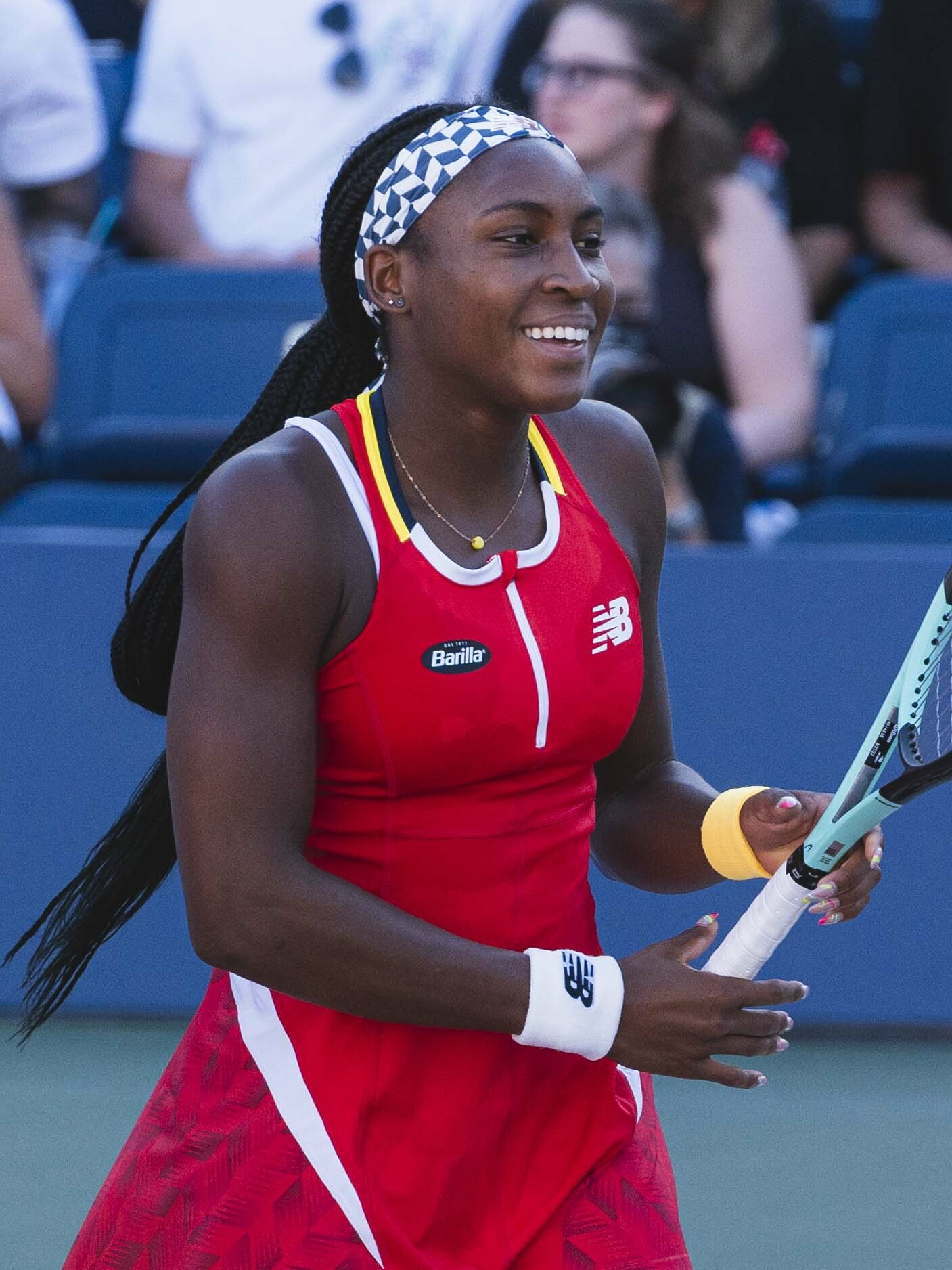
Coco Gauff was part of the winning women's doubles team. It was her first major doubles title.

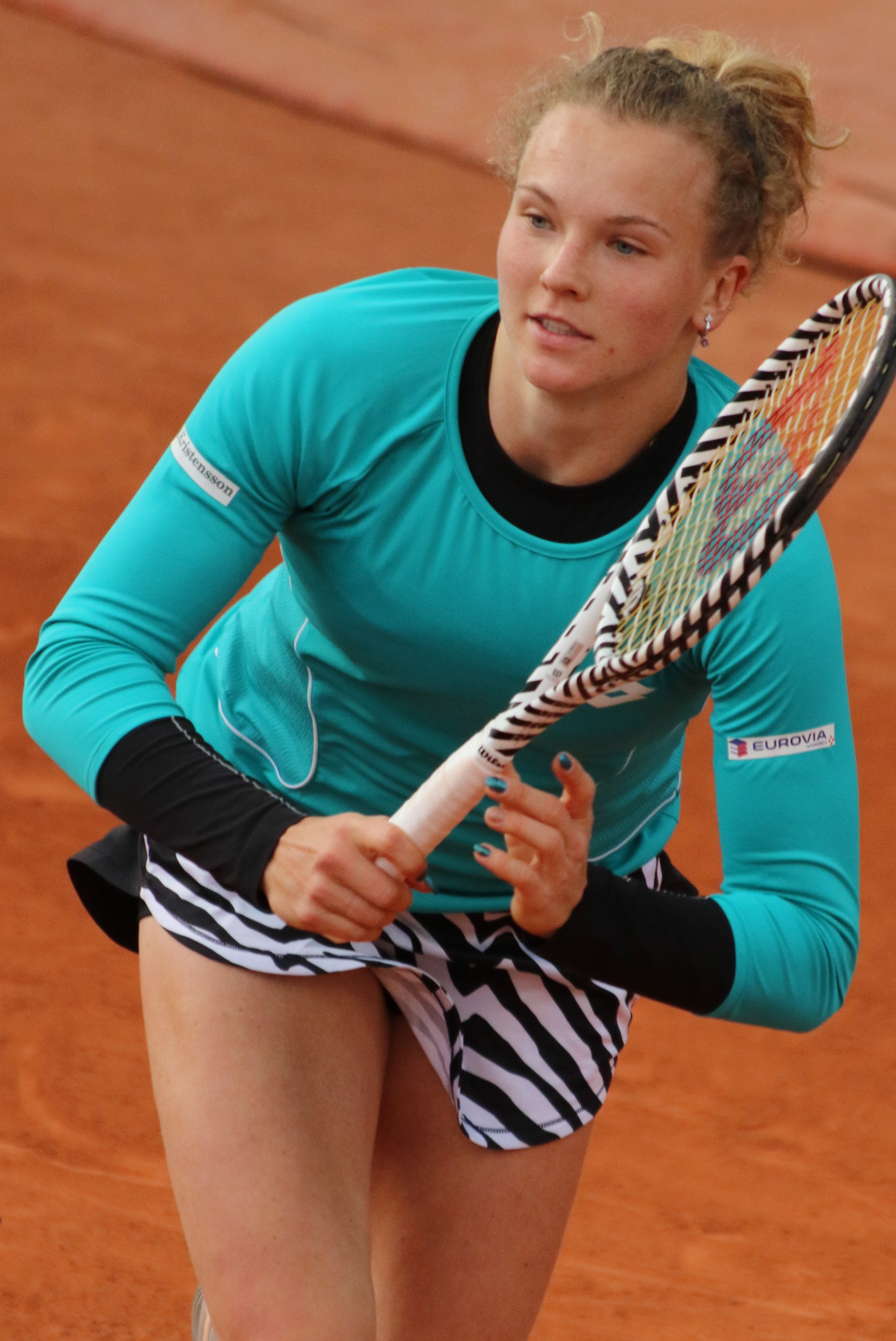
Kateřina Siniaková was part of the winning women's doubles team. It was her eighth major title.

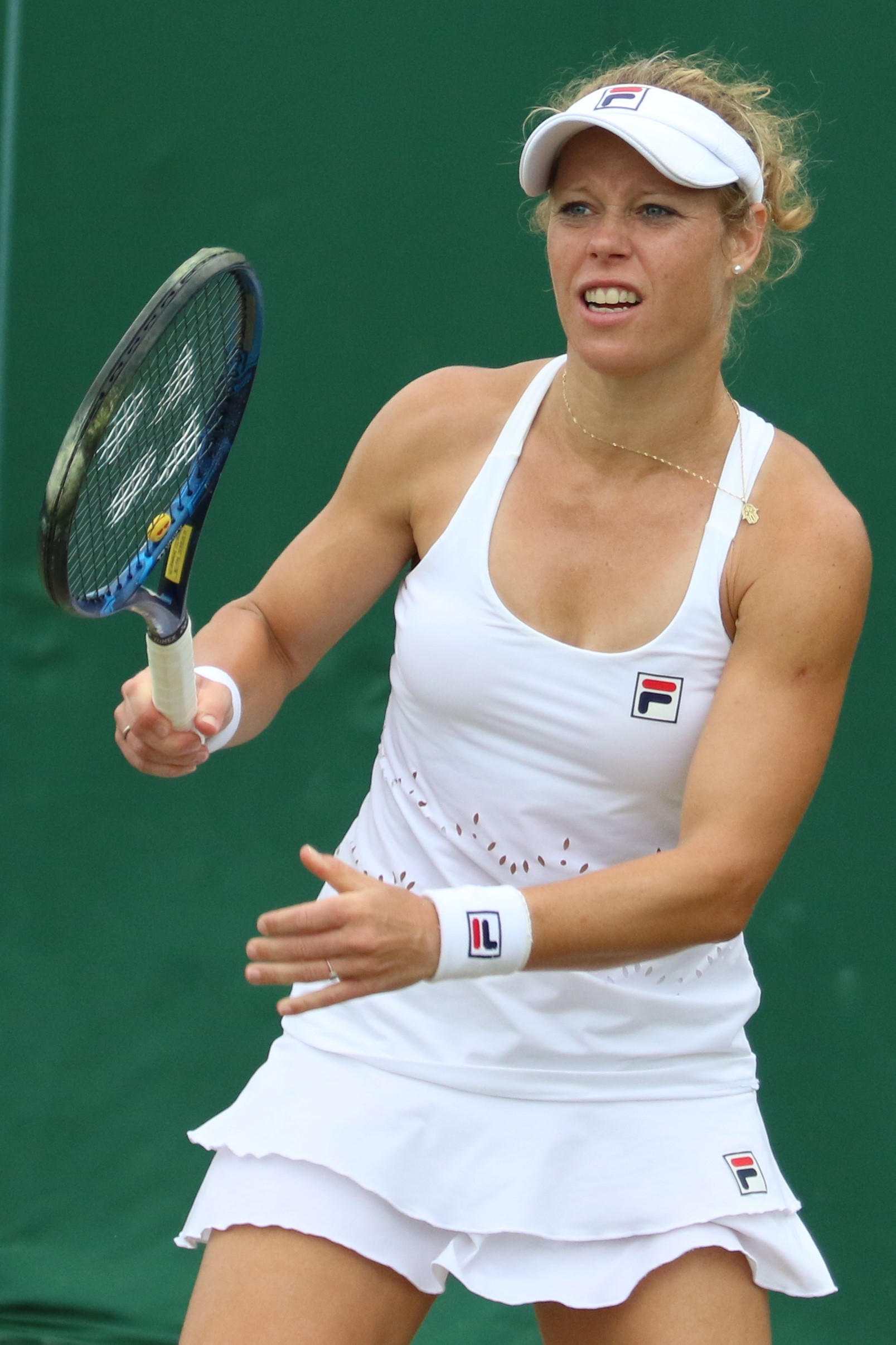
Laura Siegemund was part of the winning mixed doubles team. It was her third major title.

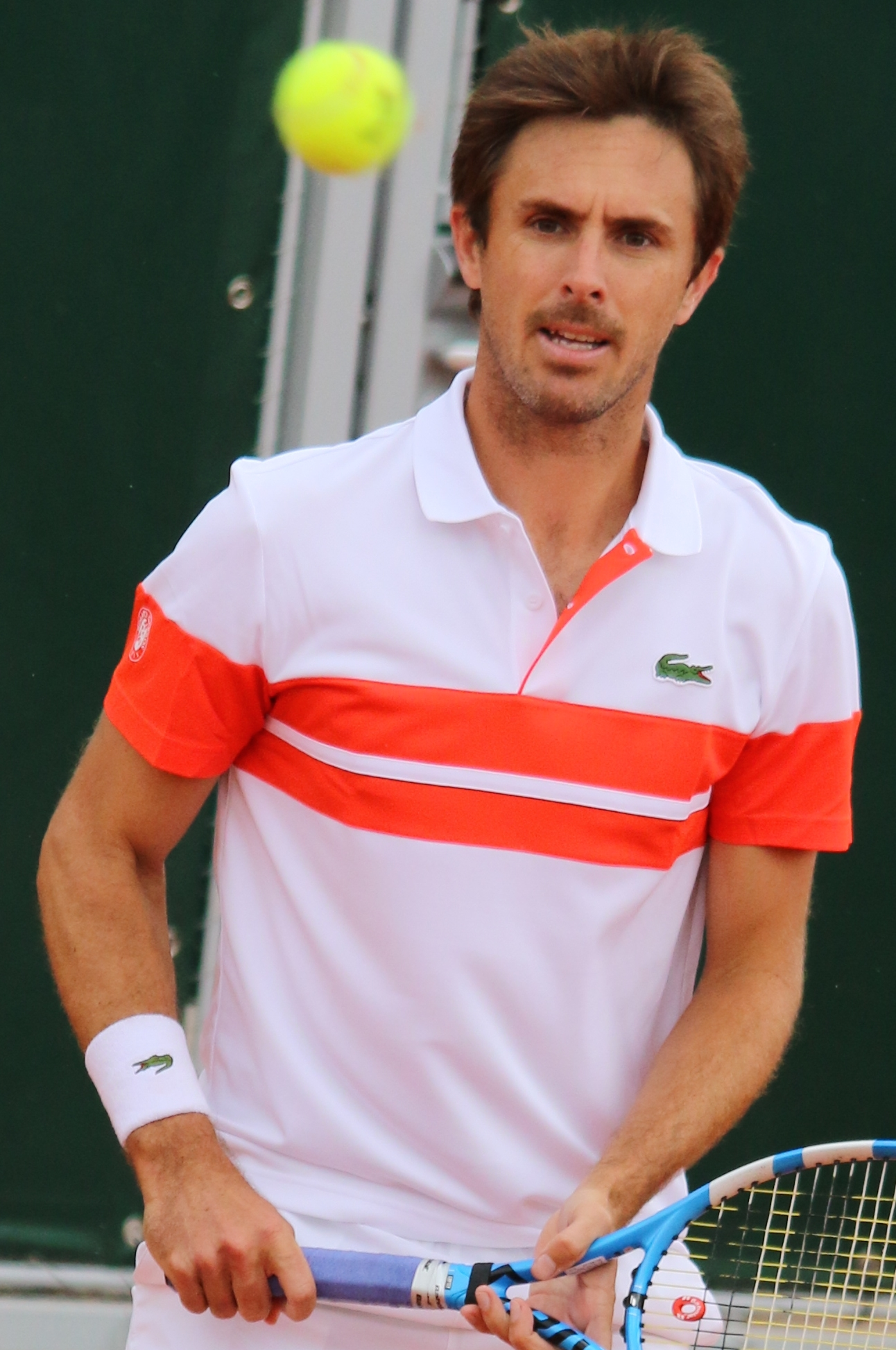
Édouard Roger-Vasselin was part of the winning mixed doubles team. It was his second major title.

== Point distribution and prize money ==
=== Point distribution ===
Below is a series of tables for each competition showing the ranking points offered for each event.

==== Senior points ====
Event	W	F	SF	QF	Round of 16	Round of 32	Round of 64	Round of 128	Q	Q3	Q2	Q1
Men's singles	2000	1300	800	400	200	100	50	10	30	16	8	0
Men's doubles	2000	1200	720	360	180	90	0	N/A				
Women's singles	2000	1300	780	430	240	130	70	10	40	30	20	2
Women's doubles	2000	1300	780	430	240	130	10	N/A				

==== Wheelchair points ====
Event	W	F	SF	QF	Round of 16
Singles	800	500	375	200	100
Doubles	800	500	375	100	N/A
Quad singles	800	500	375	200	100
Quad doubles	800	500	375	100	N/A

==== Junior points ====
Event	W	F	SF	QF	Round of 16	Round of 32	Q	Q3
Boys' singles	1000	700	490	300	180	90	25	20
Girls' singles	1000	700	490	300	180	90	25	20
Boys' doubles	750	525	367	225	135	N/A		
Girls' doubles	750	525	367	225	135	N/A		

=== Prize money ===
The French Open total prize money for 2024 is €53,478,000, an increase of 7.82% compared to 2023. The French Tennis Federation aimed to provide the best possible support for players ranked up to 250th in the world and total prize money for the qualifying rounds, now known as "Opening Week" has risen by 24.65%.

Event	Winner	Finalist	Semifinals	Quarterfinals	Round of 16	Round of 32	Round of 64	Round of 128	Q3	Q2	Q1
Singles	€2,400,000	€1,200,000	€650,000	€415,000	€250,000	€158,000	€110,000	€73,000	€41,000	€28,000	€20,000
Doubles^{1}	€590,000	€295,000	€148,000	€80,000	€43,500	€27,500	€17,500	—N/a	—N/a	—N/a	—N/a
Mixed doubles^{1}	€122,000	€61,000	€31,000	€17,500	€10,000	€5,000	—N/a	—N/a	—N/a	—N/a	—N/a
Wheelchair singles	€62,000	€31,000	€20,000	€12,000	€8,500	—N/a	—N/a	—N/a	—N/a	—N/a	—N/a
Wheelchair doubles^{1}	€21,000	€11,000	€8,000	€5,000	—N/a	—N/a	—N/a	—N/a	—N/a	—N/a	—N/a
Quad wheelchair singles	€62,000	€31,000	€20,000	€12,000	—N/a	—N/a	—N/a	—N/a	—N/a	—N/a	—N/a
Quad wheelchair doubles^{1}	€21,000	€11,000	€8,000	—N/a	—N/a	—N/a	—N/a	—N/a	—N/a	—N/a	—N/a

- ^{1} Prize money for doubles is per team.

Preceded by 2023 French Open	French Open	Succeeded by 2025 French Open
Preceded by 2024 Australian Open	Grand Slam events	Succeeded by 2024 Wimbledon Championships
