= 2026 AXERIA Open – Doubles =

Doubles
- 2026 AXERIA Open

Final
- Champion: (Croatia) Lucija Ćirić Bagarić (Italy) Angelica Moratelli
- Runner-up: (Spain) Yvonne Cavallé Reimers (Belgium) Lara Salden
- Score: 6–3, 1–6, [11–9]

Details
- Draw: 16
- Seeds: 8

Events
Singles	Doubles
- AXERIA Open

This was the first edition of the tournament.

Lucija Ćirić Bagarić and Angelica Moratelli won the title, defeating Yvonne Cavallé Reimers and Lara Salden 6–3, 1–6, [11–9] in the final.

== Seeds ==
1. (United Kingdom) Madeleine Brooks / (Netherlands) Isabelle Haverlag (first round)
2. (Spain) Yvonne Cavallé Reimers / (Belgium) Lara Salden (final)
3. (Chinese Taipei) Li Yu-yun / (China) Ye Qiuyu (first round)
4. (Romania) Irina Bara / (Switzerland) Naïma Karamoko (semifinals)

== Draw ==
Key

- Q = Qualifier
- WC = Wild card
- LL = Lucky loser
- Alt = Alternate
- ITF = ITF entry
- PR = Protected ranking
- SR = Special ranking
- SE = Special exempt
- JE = Junior exempt
- JR = Junior Accelerator Programme entrant
- CO = College Accelerator Programme entrant
- NG = Next Gen Accelerator Program entrant
- w/o = Walkover
- r = Retired
- d = Defaulted

First round
1	(United Kingdom) M Brooks (Netherlands) I Haverlag	6	4	[10]
(Sweden) C Hennemann; S Lansere	4	6	[12]
(Romania) A Prisăcariu (Bulgaria) I Shinikova	4	6^{3}
(Romania) ER Bertea; E Kazionova	6	7^{7}
3	(Chinese Taipei) Y-y Li (China) Q Ye	5	6	[2]
A Ibragimova (Hungary) A Tóth	7	4	[10]
(Croatia) L Ćirić Bagarić (Italy) A Moratelli	6	7
(France) A Monnot (France) M Rouvroy	4	5
(Estonia) E Malygina (Ukraine) A Sobolieva	4	6	[8]
(Romania) O Gavrilă (Romania) B Szabó	6	3	[10]
(Italy) D Spiteri; E Yashina	4	0
4	(Romania) I Bara (Switzerland) N Karamoko	6	6
(Czech Republic) A Laboutková (France) C Monnet	7^{7}	6
WC	(Romania) A Breaz (United States) R Gailis	6^{4}	3
(Japan) M Ayukawa (New Zealand) M Barry	2	2
2	(Spain) Y Cavallé Reimers (Belgium) L Salden	6	6

Quarterfinals
(Sweden) C Hennemann; S Lansere	6	6
(Romania) ER Bertea; E Kazionova	4	3
A Ibragimova (Hungary) A Tóth	1	1
(Croatia) L Ćirić Bagarić (Italy) A Moratelli	6	6
(Romania) O Gavrilă (Romania) B Szabó	2	6^{5}
4	(Romania) I Bara (Switzerland) N Karamoko	6	7^{7}
(Czech Republic) A Laboutková (France) C Monnet	4	1
2	(Spain) Y Cavallé Reimers (Belgium) L Salden	6	6

Semifinals
(Sweden) C Hennemann; S Lansere	5	4
(Croatia) L Ćirić Bagarić (Italy) A Moratelli	7	6
4	(Romania) I Bara (Switzerland) N Karamoko	6	0	[6]
2	(Spain) Y Cavallé Reimers (Belgium) L Salden	4	6	[10]

Final
(Croatia) L Ćirić Bagarić (Italy) A Moratelli	6	1	[11]
2	(Spain) Y Cavallé Reimers (Belgium) L Salden	3	6	[9]
