= 2025 Prague Open – Doubles =

Doubles
- 2025 Prague Open

Final
- Champions: (Ukraine) Nadiia Kichenok (Japan) Makoto Ninomiya
- Runners-up: (Czech Republic) Lucie Havlíčková (Czech Republic) Laura Samson
- Score: 1–6, 6–4, [10–7]

Details
- Draw: 16
- Seeds: 4

Events
| Singles | Doubles |
- WTA Prague Open

Nadiia Kichenok and Makoto Ninomiya defeated Lucie Havlíčková and Laura Samson in the final, 1–6, 6–4, [10–7] to win the doubles tennis title at the 2025 Prague Open. It was the pair's second WTA Tour title in as many weeks, having also won the Hamburg Open the week prior. It was the eleventh career WTA Tour title for Kichenok and tenth for Ninomiya.

Barbora Krejčíková and Kateřina Siniaková were the reigning champions, but they did not participate this year.

== Seeds ==
1. (Romania) Monica Niculescu / (Romania) Elena-Gabriela Ruse (withdrew)
2. (Ukraine) Nadiia Kichenok / (Japan) Makoto Ninomiya (champions)
3. (United States) Quinn Gleason / (Brazil) Ingrid Martins (first round)
4. (Czech Republic) Anastasia Dețiuc / (Georgia (country)) Oksana Kalashnikova (quarterfinals)

== Draw ==
Key

- Q = Qualifier
- WC = Wild card
- LL = Lucky loser
- Alt = Alternate
- ITF = ITF entry
- PR = Protected ranking
- SR = Special ranking
- SE = Special exempt
- JE = Junior exempt
- JR = Junior Accelerator Programme entrant
- CO = College Accelerator Programme entrant
- NG = Next Gen Accelerator Program entrant
- w/o = Walkover
- r = Retired
- d = Defaulted

=== Draw ===
First round
Alt | (Japan) K Okamura (France) J Ponchet | 3 | 6 | [7]
(United Kingdom) A Barnett (France) E Lechemia | 6 | 3 | [10]
(Czech Republic) J Malečková (Czech Republic) M Škoch | 6 | 7^{7}
(Germany) A-L Friedsam (Poland) M Kubka | 1 | 6^{4}
3 | (United States) Q Gleason (Brazil) I Martins | 3 | 5
WC | (Czech Republic) L Havlíčková (Czech Republic) L Samson | 6 | 7
(Italy) N Fossa Huergo (Australia) P Hon | 6 | 3 | [10]
WC | (Czech Republic) D Šalková (Czech Republic) T Valentová | 4 | 6 | [6]
(United Kingdom) H Dart (United Kingdom) M Lumsden | 3 | 7^{7} | [5]
(United Kingdom) E Appleton (Netherlands) I Haverlag | 6 | 6^{1} | [10]
(Japan) M Uchijima (China) S Zheng | 2 | 2
4 | (Czech Republic) A Dețiuc (Georgia (country)) O Kalashnikova | 6 | 6
(United States) J Aney (United States) J Failla | 5 | 3
(Spain) Y Cavallé Reimers; M Kozyreva | 7 | 6
(Italy) A Moratelli (Serbia) N Stojanović | 4 | 4
2 | (Ukraine) N Kichenok (Japan) M Ninomiya | 6 | 6

Quarterfinals
(United Kingdom) A Barnett (France) E Lechemia | 6 | 4 | [10]
(Czech Republic) J Malečková (Czech Republic) M Škoch | 4 | 6 | [7]
WC | (Czech Republic) L Havlíčková (Czech Republic) L Samson | w/o
(Italy) N Fossa Huergo (Australia) P Hon
(United Kingdom) E Appleton (Netherlands) I Haverlag | 6 | 4 | [10]
4 | (Czech Republic) A Dețiuc (Georgia (country)) O Kalashnikova | 2 | 6 | [3]
(Spain) Y Cavallé Reimers; M Kozyreva | 0 | 2
2 | (Ukraine) N Kichenok (Japan) M Ninomiya | 6 | 6

Semifinals
(United Kingdom) A Barnett (France) E Lechemia | 4 | 2
WC | (Czech Republic) L Havlíčková (Czech Republic) L Samson | 6 | 6
(United Kingdom) E Appleton (Netherlands) I Haverlag | 4 | 4
2 | (Ukraine) N Kichenok (Japan) M Ninomiya | 6 | 6

Final
WC | (Czech Republic) L Havlíčková (Czech Republic) L Samson | 6 | 4 | [7]
2 | (Ukraine) N Kichenok (Japan) M Ninomiya | 1 | 6 | [10]
