= 2026 Cundinamarca Open – Doubles =

Doubles
- 2026 Cundinamarca Open

Final
- Champions: (Slovenia) Veronika Erjavec (Kazakhstan) Zhibek Kulambayeva
- Runners-up: (Czech Republic) Laura Samson (Slovenia) Tamara Zidanšek
- Score: 5–7, 6–2, [14–12]

Details
- Draw: 8 (1WC)
- Seeds: 2

Events
Singles	Doubles
- Cundinamarca Open

This was the first edition of the tournament.

Veronika Erjavec and Zhibek Kulambayeva won the doubles title, defeating Laura Samson and Tamara Zidanšek, 5–7, 6–2, [14–12].

== Seeds ==
1. (Slovenia) Dalila Jakupović / (Slovenia) Nika Radišić (quarterfinals)
2. (United States) Rasheeda McAdoo / (United States) Anna Rogers (semifinals)

== Draw ==
Key

- Q = Qualifier
- WC = Wild card
- LL = Lucky loser
- Alt = Alternate
- ITF = ITF entry
- PR = Protected ranking
- SR = Special ranking
- SE = Special exempt
- JE = Junior exempt
- JR = Junior Accelerator Programme entrant
- CO = College Accelerator Programme entrant
- NG = Next Gen Accelerator Program entrant
- w/o = Walkover
- r = Retired
- d = Defaulted

=== Draw ===
Quarterfinals
1	(Slovenia) D Jakupović (Slovenia) N Radišić	3	5
(France) C Monnet (Brazil) L Pigossi	6	7
(Czech Republic) L Samson (Slovenia) T Zidanšek	6	7
WC	(Colombia) V Mediorreal Arias (Colombia) MP Pérez García	1	5
(Slovenia) V Erjavec (Kazakhstan) Z Kulambayeva	6	6
(Australia) T McGiffin (Australia) A Osborne	2	2
(Belgium) S Costoulas (United States) A Zamarripa	6	4	[5]
2	(United States) R McAdoo (United States) A Rogers	1	6	[10]

Semifinals
(France) C Monnet (Brazil) L Pigossi	6	4	[6]
(Czech Republic) L Samson (Slovenia) T Zidanšek	3	6	[10]
(Slovenia) V Erjavec (Kazakhstan) Z Kulambayeva	6	7
2	(United States) R McAdoo (United States) A Rogers	1	5

Final
(Czech Republic) L Samson (Slovenia) T Zidanšek	7	2	[12]
(Slovenia) V Erjavec (Kazakhstan) Z Kulambayeva	5	6	[14]
