= 2025 Prague Open =

Women's tennis tournament

- Date: 21–26 July
- Edition: 16th
- Category: WTA 250
- Draw: 32S / 16D
- Surface: Hard / outdoor
- Location: Prague, Czech Republic
- Venue: TK Sparta Prague

Champions

Singles
- (Czech Republic) Marie Bouzková

Doubles
- (Ukraine) Nadiia Kichenok / (Japan) Makoto Ninomiya
- WTA Prague Open

The 2025 Prague Open (branded as the Livesport Prague Open for sponsorship reasons) was a professional women's tennis tournament played on outdoor hard courts at the TK Sparta Prague. It was the 16th edition of the tournament, and a WTA 250 tournament on the 2025 WTA Tour. It took place in Prague, Czech Republic from 21 to 26 July 2025.

== Champions ==
=== Singles ===
- (Czech Republic) Marie Bouzková def. (Czech Republic) Linda Nosková 2–6, 6–1, 6–3

=== Doubles ===
- (Ukraine) Nadiia Kichenok / (Japan) Makoto Ninomiya def. (Czech Republic) Lucie Havlíčková / (Czech Republic) Laura Samson 1–6, 6–4, [10–7]

== Singles main draw entrants ==
=== Seeds ===
Country	Player	Rank^{†}	Seed
CZE	Linda Nosková	23	1
SVK	Rebecca Šramková	33	2
~~UKR~~	~~Dayana Yastremska~~	~~39~~	~~3~~
CHN	Wang Xinyu	40	4
CZE	Marie Bouzková	46	5
~~ARM~~	~~Elina Avanesyan~~	~~53~~	~~6~~
ROU	Elena-Gabriela Ruse	57	7
USA	Alycia Parks	59	8
USA	Ann Li	65	9

^{†} Rankings are as of 14 July 2025.

=== Other entrants ===
The following players received wildcards into the singles main draw:

- (Czech Republic) Lucie Havlíčková
- (Czech Republic) Barbora Palicová
- (Czech Republic) Dominika Šalková
- (Czech Republic) Laura Samson

The following players received entry from the qualifying draw:

- (China) Gao Xinyu
- Anastasia Gasanova
- (Japan) Mai Hontama
- (Czech Republic) Alena Kovačková
- (Czech Republic) Jesika Malečková
- (Australia) Astra Sharma

The following players received entry as lucky losers:

- (France) Jessika Ponchet
- (Italy) Lucrezia Stefanini
- (Serbia) Nina Stojanović

=== Withdrawals ===
- Erika Andreeva → replaced by (Czech Republic) Sára Bejlek
- (Armenia) Elina Avanesyan → replaced by (Serbia) Nina Stojanović
- (Hungary) Anna Bondár → replaced by (France) Jessika Ponchet
- (Spain) Jéssica Bouzas Maneiro → replaced by (Japan) Aoi Ito
- (Italy) Lucia Bronzetti → replaced by (United Kingdom) Harriet Dart
- (Romania) Jaqueline Cristian → replaced by (Italy) Elisabetta Cocciaretto
- (Germany) Eva Lys → replaced by (France) Léolia Jeanjean
- Anastasia Pavlyuchenkova → replaced by (Czech Republic) Tereza Valentová
- (United States) Bernarda Pera → replaced by (Australia) Priscilla Hon
- (Ukraine) Dayana Yastremska → replaced by (Italy) Lucrezia Stefanini

== Doubles main draw entrants ==
=== Seeds ===
Country	Player	Country	Player	Rank^{†}	Seed
~~ROU~~	~~Monica Niculescu~~	~~ROU~~	~~Elena-Gabriela Ruse~~	~~126~~	~~1~~
UKR	Nadiia Kichenok	JPN	Makoto Ninomiya	129	2
USA	Quinn Gleason	BRA	Ingrid Martins	135	3
CZE	Anastasia Dețiuc	GEO	Oksana Kalashnikova	145	4

^{†} Rankings are as of 14 July 2025.

=== Other entrants ===
The following pairs received wildcards into the doubles main draw:

- (Czech Republic) Lucie Havlíčková / (Czech Republic) Laura Samson
- (Czech Republic) Dominika Šalková / (Czech Republic) Tereza Valentová

The following pair received entry as alternates:

- (Japan) Kyōka Okamura / (France) Jessika Ponchet

=== Withdrawals ===
- (Romania) Monica Niculescu / (Romania) Elena-Gabriela Ruse → replaced by (Japan) Kyōka Okamura / (France) Jessika Ponchet
