= AXERIA Open =

- 2026 AXERIA Open

WTA 125
- Event name: AXERIA Open powered by INTARO Sport
- Location: Târgu Mureș, Romania
- Venue: Baza INTARO Sport
- Category: WTA 125
- Surface: Clay
- Draw: 32S/16Q/16D
- Prize money: $115,000
- Website: Website

Current champions (2026)
- Singles: (Czech Republic) Laura Samson
- Doubles: (Croatia) Lucija Ćirić Bagarić (Italy) Angelica Moratelli

The AXERIA Open is a tournament for professional female tennis players played on outdoor clay courts. The event is classified as a WTA 125 tournament and is held at the Baza INTARO Sport in Târgu Mureș, Romania. The tournament was introduced in 2026 after staging three editions on the ATP Challenger Tour in 2025 and 2026 covered under the INTARO Open.

== Past finals ==
=== Singles ===
Year	Champion	Runners-up	Score
2026	(Czech Republic) Laura Samson	(Spain) Kaitlin Quevedo	2–6, 6–3, 6–1

=== Doubles ===
Year	Champions	Runners-up	Score
2026	(Croatia) Lucija Ćirić Bagarić (Italy) Angelica Moratelli	(Spain) Yvonne Cavallé Reimers (Belgium) Lara Salden	6–3, 1–6, [11–9]
