= Cundinamarca Open =

- 2026 Cundinamarca Open

Tournament information
- Event name: Cundinamarca Open
- Location: Sopó, Colombia
- Venue: Complejo Deportivo La Trinidad
- Category: WTA 125
- Surface: Clay
- Draw: 32S/8Q/8D
- Prize money: $115,000
- Website: Official Website

Current champions (2026)
- Singles: (Canada) Bianca Andreescu
- Doubles: (Slovenia) Veronika Erjavec (Kazakhstan) Zhibek Kulambayeva

The Cundinamarca Open is a tournament for professional female tennis players played on outdoor clay courts. The event is classified as a WTA 125 tournament and is held at the Complejo Deportivo La Trinidad, also known as Sopó Municipal Complex, in Sopó, Colombia. It is the third WTA 125 event to be introduced in Colombia after Copa Bionaire and Barranquilla Open. The tournament is part of a series of tennis events organized by Tennium in South America to boost the growth of the sport in the local communities.

== Past finals ==
=== Singles ===
Year	Champion	Runners-up	Score
2026	(Canada) Bianca Andreescu	(United States) Elizabeth Mandlik	6–3, 6–3

=== Doubles ===
Year	Champions	Runners-up	Score
2026	(Slovenia) Veronika Erjavec (Kazakhstan) Zhibek Kulambayeva	(Czech Republic) Laura Samson (Slovenia) Tamara Zidanšek	5–7, 6–2, [14–12]
