= Laura Samson =

Czech tennis player (born 2008)

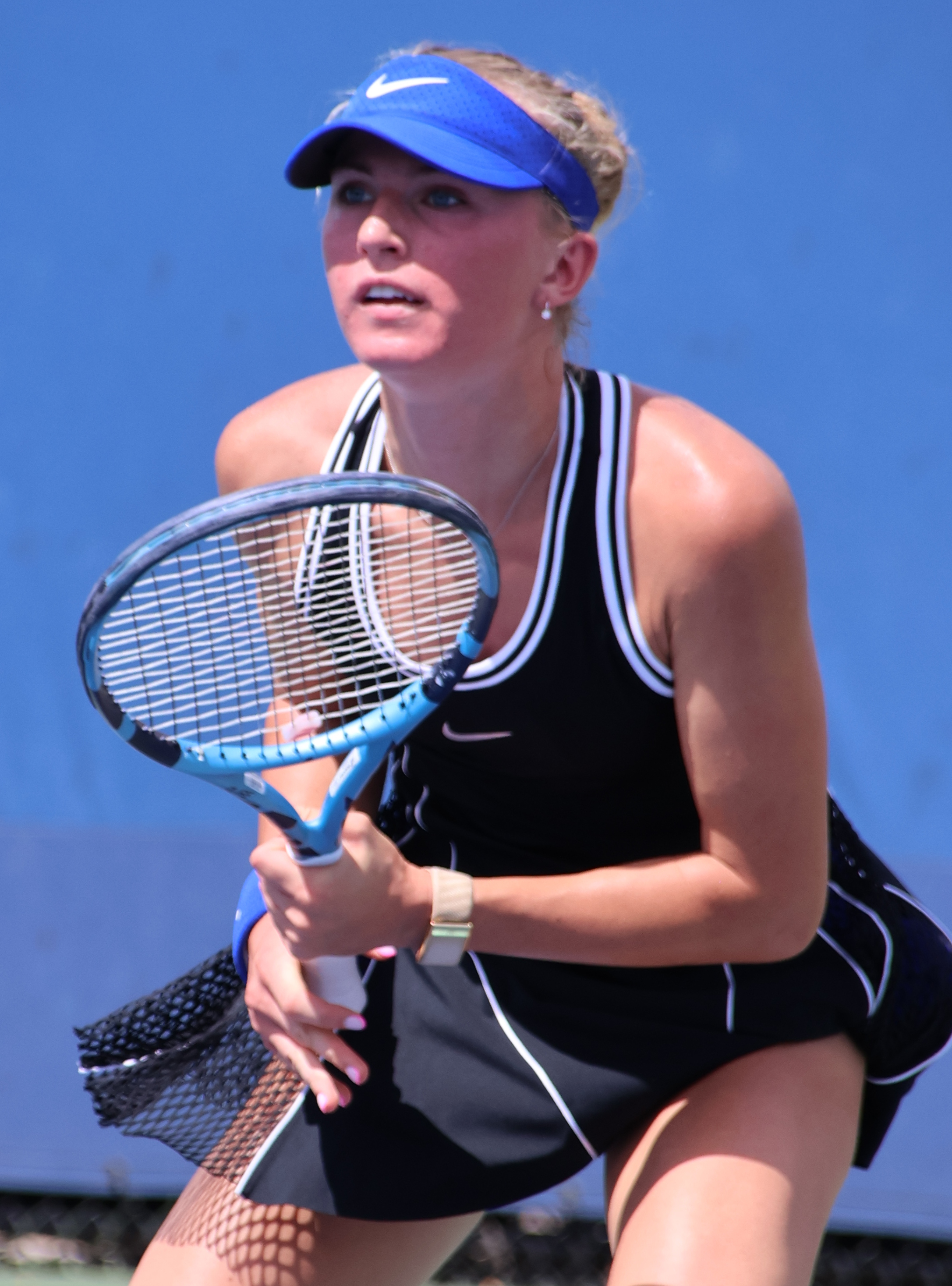
- Samson at the 2026 US Open
- Country (sports): Czech Republic
- Born: 10 March 2008 (age 18) Prague, Czech Republic
- Plays: Right-handed
- Prize money: US$ 422,674

Singles
- Career record: 101–50
- Career titles: 1 WTA 125
- Highest ranking: No. 107 (16 November 2026)
- Current ranking: No. 107 (16 November 2026)

Grand Slam singles results
- Australian Open: Q1 (2026)
- French Open: Q1 (2026)
- Wimbledon: Q1 (2026)
- US Open: Q1 (2026)

Doubles
- Career record: 24–16
- Career titles: 1 ITF
- Highest ranking: No. 144 (5 January 2026)
- Current ranking: No. 187 (16 November 2026)

Grand Slam doubles results
- French Open Junior: SF (2024)
- Wimbledon Junior: W (2023)
- US Open Junior: QF (2023)
- Last updated on: 12 October 2026.

Laura Samson (formerly known by her birth name Laura Samsonová; 10 March 2008) is a Czech professional tennis player. She has a career-high singles ranking of No. 107 by the WTA, achieved on 16 November 2026, and a best in doubles of No. 144, reached on 5 January 2026.

Samson won the girls' doubles title at the 2023 Wimbledon Championships and was a runner-up in girls' singles at the 2024 French Open and has won one title at WTA 125 level, in singles.

== Personal background ==
In 2024, she changed her surname to the masculine form to be distinguished from another WTA Tour tennis player, Russian Liudmila Samsonova, with whom she shared the same abbreviated name (L. Samsonova).

== Career ==
=== Juniors ===
A member of TK Sparta Prague, Samson won her first junior title as a 13-year-old at a J5 event in Prostějov in an October 2021, without dropping a set. It was her first junior-level event. She then won her second J5 event in November 2021 in Silla-Saledar in Spain, and reached the final in her third, in Montemar.

In July 2023, she won the Wimbledon girls' doubles title with compatriot Alena Kovačková. In the final, they faced Hannah Klugman and Isabelle Lacy of Great Britain, winning in straight sets. They were the first Czech pairing to win the title since Barbora Krejčíková and Kateřina Siniaková in 2013.

In June 2024, she reached the final of the French Open girls' singles tournament but lost to compatriot Tereza Valentová. Defending the Wimbledon girls' doubles title alongside Kovačková in 2024, they lost in the quarterfinals to Mika Stojsavljevic and Mingge Xu.

In October 2024, she reached the final of the ITF World Tennis Tour Junior Finals, which she lost in two close sets to world No. 1, Emerson Jones. She later said it had been her last junior tournament with focus on pro tour.

=== 2024: WTA Tour debut and first win ===
Given a wildcard entry into the 2024 Prague Open, Samson became the first player born in 2008 or later to win a WTA Tour main-draw match when she defeated qualifier Tara Würth in straight sets in the first round. In the second round she upset second seed Kateřina Siniaková in three sets to make it through to the quarterfinals, where she defeated Oksana Selekhmeteva. Her run came to an end in the semifinals when she retired injured while trailing in the third set against Magdalena Fręch.

After reaching the final at the ITF Tour Junior Finals, Samson received her second tour main-draw wildcard from the 2024 Mérida Open, but she was unable to pass the first round, losing in two close sets to Antonia Ružić.

=== 2025: First tour final ===
Samson received wildcard to compete at 2025 Abu Dhabi Open, losing in the opening round of qualification to former top 10 player Veronika Kudermetova. She and Markéta Vondroušová scored two wins before losing in the semifinals.

Samson won her first W75 title in Česká Lípa at Macha Lake Open, beating Carolina Alves in three sets.

Samson competed at 2025 Prague Open but could not defend her last year semifinal run as she lost in the opening round to fellow Czech Dominika Šalková. She and Lucie Havlíčková scored two big wins on a way to their first WTA Tour final where they lost to second seeds Makoto Ninomiya and Nadiia Kichenok in three sets, after winning opening set 6-1.

After two months hiatus, Samson won two W50 titles, in Pazardzhik and Heraklion. She reached her new career-high ranking at No. 218 as a result.

=== 2026: First WTA 1000 win and WTA 125 title ===
Samson made her major debut in the qualifiers of the Australian Open where she lost in the first round to Zeynep Sönmez. In March, she defeated Lucie Havlíčková to win the W75 Trnava Indoor in Slovakia.

Playing as a wildcard, she defeated Tatjana Maria in the first round of the Madrid Open to get her first WTA 1000 win. She went on to defeat 28th seed Wang Xinyu to reach the third round in which she lost to Anna Bondár. As a result of her performance, she recorded a career-high ranking of 152.

In August, Samson won her first WTA 125 single title at the AXERIA Open in Romania, defeating top-seeded Kaitlin Quevedo in the final.

== Performance timeline ==
Key
W	F	SF	QF	#R	RR	Q#	P#	DNQ	A	Z#	PO	G	S	B	NMS	NTI	P	NH

(W) winner; (F) finalist; (SF) semifinalist; (QF) quarterfinalist; (#R) rounds 4, 3, 2, 1; (RR) round-robin stage; (Q#) qualification round; (P#) preliminary round; (DNQ) did not qualify; (A) absent; (Z#) Davis/Fed Cup Zonal Group (with number indication) or (PO) play-off; (G) gold, (S) silver or (B) bronze Olympic/Paralympic medal; (NMS) not a Masters tournament; (NTI) not a Tier I tournament; (P) postponed; (NH) not held; (SR) strike rate (events won / competed); (W–L) win–loss record.
To avoid confusion and double counting, these charts are updated at the conclusion of a tournament or when the player's participation has ended.

Only main-draw results in WTA Tour, Grand Slam tournaments, Billie Jean King Cup, United Cup, Hopman Cup and Olympic Games are included in win–loss records.

=== Singles ===
Current through the 2026 Wuhan Open.

Tournament	2024	2025	2026	SR	W–L	Win %
Grand Slam tournaments
Australian Open	A	A	Q1	0 / 0	0–0	–
French Open	A	A	Q1	0 / 0	0–0	–
Wimbledon	A	A	Q1	0 / 0	0–0	–
US Open	A	A	Q1	0 / 0	0–0	–
Win–Loss	0–0	0–0	0–0	0 / 0	0–0	–
WTA 1000 tournaments
Qatar Open	A	A	A	0 / 0	0–0	–
Dubai Championships	A	A	A	0 / 0	0–0	–
Indian Wells Open	A	A	A	0 / 0	0–0	–
Miami Open	A	A	A	0 / 0	0–0	–
Madrid Open	A	A	3R	0 / 1	2–1	67%
Italian Open	A	A	A	0 / 0	0–0	–
Canadian Open	A	A	A	0 / 0	0–0	–
Cincinnati Open	A	A	A	0 / 0	0–0	–
China Open	A	A	A	0 / 0	0–0	–
Wuhan Open	A	A	A	0 / 0	0–0	–
Win–Loss	0–0	0–0	2–1	0 / 1	2–1	67%
Career statistics
	2024	2025	2026	SR	W–L	Win %
Tournaments	2	1	2	Career total: 5		
Titles	0	0	0	Career total: 0		
Finals	0	0	0	Career total: 0		
Hard Win–Loss	0–1	0–1	0–1	0 / 3	0–3	0%
Clay Win–Loss	3–1	0–0	2–1	0 / 2	5–2	71%
Grass Win–Loss	0–0	0–0	0–0	0 / 0	0–0	–
Overall Win–Loss	3–2	0–1	2–2	0 / 5	5–5	50%
Win %	60%	0%	50%	Career total: 50%		
Year-end ranking	342	253				

== WTA Tour finals ==
=== Doubles: 2 (2 runner-ups) ===
Legend WTA 250 (0–2)	Finals by surface Hard (0–2)	Finals by setting Outdoor (0–2)

Result	W–L	Date	Tournament	Tier	Surface	Partner	Opponents	Score
Loss	0–1	Jul 2025	Prague Open, Czech Republic	WTA 250	Hard	(Czech Republic) Lucie Havlíčková	(Japan) Makoto Ninomiya (Ukraine) Nadiya Kichenok	6–1, 4–6, [7–10]
Loss	0–2	Jul 2026	Prague Open, Czech Republic	WTA 250	Hard	(Czech Republic) Lucie Havlíčková	(United Kingdom) Harriet Dart (United Kingdom) Maia Lumsden	4–6, 4–6

== WTA 125 finals ==
=== Singles: 2 (1 title, 1 runner-up) ===
Result	W–L	Date	Tournament	Surface	Opponent	Score
Win	1–0	Aug 2026	Târgu Mureș Open, Romania	Clay	(Spain) Kaitlin Quevedo	2–6, 6–3, 6–1
Loss	1–1	Oct 2026	Mallorca Championships, Spain	Clay	(Spain) Ariana Geerlings	2–6, 2–6

=== Doubles: 2 (runner-ups) ===
Result	W–L	Date	Tournament	Surface	Partner	Opponents	Score
Loss	0–1	Nov 2025	Buenos Aires Open, Argentina	Clay	(Argentina) Nicole Fossa Huergo	(Spain) Alicia Herrero Liñana (Brazil) Laura Pigossi	2–6, 6–7^{(5–7)}
Loss	0–2	Nov 2026	Cundinamarca Open, Colombia	Clay	(Slovenia) Tamara Zidanšek	(Slovenia) Veronika Erjavec (Kazakhstan) Zhibek Kulambayeva	7–5, 2–6, [12–14]

== ITF Circuit finals ==
=== Singles: 9 (8 titles, 1 runner-up) ===
Legend W75 tournaments (3–0) W50 tournaments (2–0) W15 tournaments (3–1)	Finals by surface Hard (2–1) Clay (6–0)

Result	W–L	Date	Tournament	Tier	Surface	Opponent	Score
Win	1–0	Feb 2024	ITF Monastir, Tunisia	W15	Hard	(Germany) Selina Dal	6–1, 6–3
Loss	1–1	Feb 2024	ITF Sharm El Sheikh, Egypt	W15	Hard	(Egypt) Sandra Samir	0–6, 4–6
Win	2–1	May 2024	ITF Kranjska Gora, Slovenia	W15	Clay	(Romania) Oana Gavrilă	6–1, 6–4
Win	3–1	May 2024	ITF Bol, Croatia	W15	Clay	(Croatia) Sara Svetac	6–1, 6–2
Win	4–1	Jun 2025	Macha Lake Open, Czech Republic	W75	Clay	(Brazil) Carolina Alves	2–6, 6–2, 6–3
Win	5–1	Sep 2025	Pazardzhik Cup, Bulgaria	W50+H	Clay	(Spain) Andrea Lázaro García	6–2, 6–3
Win	6–1	Oct 2025	ITF Heraklion, Greece	W50	Clay	(France) Séléna Janicijevic	5–7, 6–2, 6–1
Win	7–1	Feb 2026	Trnava Indoor, Slovakia	W75	Hard (i)	(Czech Republic) Lucie Havlíčková	6–4, 6–2
Win	8–1	May 2026	ITF Kuršumlijska Banja, Serbia	W75	Clay	(Serbia) Lola Radivojević	6–3, 3–6, 7–5

=== Doubles: 2 (1 title, 1 runner-up) ===
Legend
W75 tournaments (1–0)
W50 tournaments (0–1)

Result	W–L	Date	Tournament	Tier	Surface	Partner	Opponents	Score
Loss	0–1	Nov 2024	ITF Chihuahua City, Mexico	W50	Hard	(Mexico) Ana Sofía Sánchez	(United States) Haley Giavara (United States) Dalayna Hewitt	1–6, 3–6
Win	1–1	Mar 2026	ITF Murska Sobota, Slovenia	W75	Hard (i)	(Czech Republic) Lucie Havlíčková	(United States) Rasheeda McAdoo (United States) Alana Smith	w/o

== Junior Grand Slam tournament finals ==
=== Singles: 1 (runner-up) ===
Result	Year	Tournament	Surface	Opponent	Score
Loss	2024	French Open	Clay	(Czech Republic) Tereza Valentová	3–6, 6–7^{(0–7)}

=== Doubles: 1 (title) ===
Result	Year	Tournament	Surface	Partner	Opponents	Score
Win	2023	Wimbledon	Grass	(Czech Republic) Alena Kovačková	(United Kingdom) Isabelle Lacy (United Kingdom) Hannah Klugman	6–4, 7–5
