= Lucija Ćirić Bagarić =

Croatian tennis player (born 2004)

- Country (sports): Croatia
- Born: 9 January 2004 (age 22) Dubrovnik, Croatia
- Plays: Right-handed
- Prize money: $332,513

Singles
- Career record: 170–119
- Career titles: 9 ITF World Tour
- Highest ranking: No. 157 (5 August 2024)
- Current ranking: No. 405 (9 November 2026)

Grand Slam singles results
- Australian Open: Q3 (2025)
- French Open: 1R (2024)
- Wimbledon: Q1 (2024)
- US Open: Q2 (2024)

Doubles
- Career record: 92–45
- Career titles: 3 WTA 125, 4 ITF
- Highest ranking: No. 89 (26 October 2026)
- Current ranking: No. 91 (9 November 2026)

Team competitions
- BJK Cup: 3–4
- Last updated on: 9 November 2026.

Lucija Ćirić Bagarić (born 9 January 2004) is a Croatian professional tennis player. She has a career-high WTA singles ranking of 157, achieved on 5 August 2024, and a highest doubles ranking of 89, achieved on 26 October 2026. She has won three WTA 125 doubles titles, with nine singles and four doubles titles on the ITF World Tour.

== Early life ==
Ćirić Bagarić was born in Dubrovnik and grew up in Lapad. Her father was a footballer.

She began playing tennis at the age of six, and, at the age of 13, she moved to Zagreb for better training opportunities. After her junior career, she was extended offers to play tennis at Harvard University and Princeton University, but chose to pursue professional tennis instead.

== Career ==
Ćirić Bagarić made her debut for Croatia in the Billie Jean King Cup in April 2023 playing doubles in the Europe/Africa Zone. In September 2023, she made her WTA 125 debut at the Ljubljana Open, where she reached the quarterfinals.

She was named ITF World Tennis Tour Player of the Month in February 2024.

Ranked No. 185, she qualified for her first Grand Slam tournament at the 2024 French Open, after defeating Arina Rodionova, Rebecca Marino, and Sara Saito in the qualifying competition without dropping a set. She lost to Peyton Stearns in the first round, in three sets.

Teaming with Angelica Moratelli, Ćirić Bagarić won three WTA 125 doubles titles in 2026 at the AXERIA Open, Ljubljana Open and Mallorca Women's Championships.

== Grand Slam singles performance timeline ==
Key
W	F	SF	QF	#R	RR	Q#	DNQ	A	NH

(W) winner; (F) finalist; (SF) semifinalist; (QF) quarterfinalist; (#R) rounds 4, 3, 2, 1; (RR) round-robin stage; (Q#) qualification round; (DNQ) did not qualify; (A) absent; (NH) not held; (SR) strike rate (events won / competed); (W–L) win–loss record.
To avoid confusion and double counting, these charts are updated at the conclusion of a tournament or when the player's participation has ended.

Tournament	2024	2025	2026	SR	W–L
Australian Open	A	Q3	A	0 / 0	0–0
French Open	1R	A	A	0 / 1	0–1
Wimbledon	Q1	A	A	0 / 0	0–0
US Open	Q2	A	A	0 / 0	0–0
Win–Loss	0–1	0–0	0–0	0 / 1	0–1

== WTA 125 finals ==
=== Doubles: 4 (3 titles, 1 runner-up) ===
Result	W–L	Date	Tournament	Surface	Partner	Opponents	Score
Loss	0–1	Jul 2026	ATV Rome Open, Italy	Clay	(Slovenia) Nika Radišić	(France) Estelle Cascino (China) Feng Shuo	4–6, 4–6
Win	1–1	Jul 2026	Târgu Mureș Open, Romania	Clay	(Italy) Angelica Moratelli	(Spain) Yvonne Cavallé Reimers (Belgium) Lara Salden	6–3, 1–6, [11–9]
Win	2–1	Sep 2026	Ljubljana Open, Slovenia	Clay	(Italy) Angelica Moratelli	(France) Estelle Cascino (China) Feng Shuo	6–7^{(4–7)}, 6–4, [10–5]
Win	3–1	Oct 2026	Mallorca Championships, Spain	Clay	(Italy) Angelica Moratelli	(Spain) Yvonne Cavallé Reimers (Brazil) Laura Pigossi	2–6, 6–3, [12–10]

== ITF Circuit finals ==
=== Singles: 15 (9 titles, 6 runner-ups) ===
Legend W75 tournaments W25/35 tournaments W15 tournaments	Finals by surface Hard (3–1) Clay (6–5)

Result	W–L	Date	Tournament	Tier	Surface	Opponent	Score
Loss	0–1	Sep 2022	ITF Varna, Bulgaria	W15	Clay	(Romania) Patricia Maria Țig	1–6, 0–6
Win	1–1	Nov 2022	ITF Heraklion, Greece	W15	Clay	(Greece) Michaela Laki	6–3, 4–6, 6–4
Win	2–1	Nov 2022	ITF Oberpullendorf, Austria	W15	Hard (i)	(Czech Republic) Denisa Hindová	6–4, 6–2
Win	3–1	Dec 2022	ITF Oberpullendorf, Austria	W15	Hard (i)	Victoria Kan	6–3, 6–0
Loss	3–2	Jul 2023	ITF Parnu, Estonia	W25	Clay	(Czech Republic) Sára Bejlek	5–7, 4–6
Win	4–2	Jul 2023	ITF Koge, Denmark	W25	Clay	(Belgium) Hanne Vandewinkel	6–3, 7–5
Loss	4–3	Aug 2023	ITF Bistrita, Romania	W25	Clay	(Romania) Anca Todoni	5–7, 6–1, 2–6
Loss	4–4	Sep 2023	ITF Slobozia, Romania	W25	Clay	Ekaterina Makarova	7–5, 4–6, 5–7
Loss	4–5	Nov 2023	ITF Lousada, Portugal	W25	Hard (i)	(France) Margaux Rouvroy	2–6, 3–6
Win	5–5	Jan 2024	ITF Monastir, Tunisia	W35	Hard	Polina Iatcenko	7–5, 6–2
Win	6–5	Feb 2024	ITF Hammamet, Tunisia	W35	Clay	(Belgium) Marie Benoît	6–2, 7–5
Win	7–5	Feb 2024	ITF Hammamet, Tunisia	W35	Clay	(United Kingdom) Francesca Jones	2–1 ret.
Win	8–5	Mar 2024	ITF Alaminos, Cyprus	W35	Clay	(North Macedonia) Lina Gjorcheska	6–2, 6–3
Loss	8–6	Jul 2024	Internazionali di Cordenons, Italy	W75	Clay	(Netherlands) Anouk Koevermans	6–7^{(4)}, 2–6
Win	9–6	Sep 2025	ITF Reus, Spain	W35	Clay	(Spain) Aliona Bolsova	6–1, 3–6, 6–1

=== Doubles: 13 (4 titles, 9 runner-ups) ===
Legend W100 tournaments W75 tournaments W50 tournaments W25/35 tournaments W15 tournaments	Finals by surface Hard (1–1) Clay (3–8)

Result	W–L	Date	Tournament	Tier	Surface	Partner	Opponents	Score
Loss	0–1	Mar 2022	ITF Marrakech, Morocco	W15	Clay	(United States) Clervie Ngounoue	(Switzerland) Naïma Karamoko (Portugal) Inês Murta	2–6, 7–6^{(2)}, [5–10]
Loss	0–2	Aug 2022	ITF Trieste, Italy	W25	Clay	(Latvia) Diāna Marcinkēviča	(China) Lu Jiajing (Slovenia) Nika Radišić	5–7, 6–3, [13–15]
Loss	0–3	Jul 2023	ITF Parnu, Estonia	W25	Clay	(Switzerland) Jenny Dürst	(Italy) Nicole Fossa Huergo (Germany) Luisa Meyer auf der Heide	5–7, 5–7
Loss	0–4	Jan 2025	Porto Indoor, Portugal	W50+H	Hard (i)	(Slovenia) Kristina Novak	(Portugal) Francisca Jorge (Portugal) Matilde Jorge	3–6, 2–6
Loss	0–5	May 2025	Zagreb Open, Croatia	W75	Clay	Vitalia Diatchenko	(Portugal) Francisca Jorge (Portugal) Matilde Jorge	2–6, 0–6
Loss	0–6	Sep 2025	ITF Reus, Spain	W35	Clay	(France) Tiphanie Lemaître	(Hungary) Adrienn Nagy (Germany) Joëlle Steur	1–6, 6–3, [9–11]
Win	1–6	Nov 2025	ITF Liberec, Czech Republic	W35	Hard (i)	(Czech Republic) Lucie Havlíčková	(Czech Republic) Denisa Hindová (Czech Republic) Alena Kovačková	6–1, 6–1
Loss	1–7	Nov 2025	ITF Antalya, Turkiye	W35	Clay	(Romania) Ilinca Amariei	Amina Anshba (Hungary) Amarissa Tóth	5–7, 5–7
Win	2–7	Jan 2026	ITF Antalya, Turkiye	W35	Clay	(Italy) Francesca Pace	Daria Lodikova; Alexandra Shubladze	4–6, 6–3, [12–10]
Loss	2–8	Jan 2026	ITF Antalya, Turkiye	W35	Clay	(Hungary) Amarissa Tóth	Darya Astakhova (Romania) Andreea Prisăcariu	2–6, 6–3, [8–10]
Win	3–8	Apr 2026	Wiesbaden Open, Germany	W100	Clay	(Slovenia) Nika Radišić	(Czech Republic) Lucie Havlíčková (Czech Republic) Anna Sisková	5–7, 7–6^{(3)}, [10–5]
Win	4–8	Jun 2026	Zagreb Ladies Open, Croatia	W100	Clay	(Italy) Angelica Moratelli	(Bulgaria) Rositsa Dencheva; Ekaterina Kazionova	7–5, 6–3
Loss	4–9	Aug 2026	Serbian Tennis Tour, Serbia	W75	Clay	(Poland) Weronika Falkowska	Varvara Panshina; Rada Zolotareva	5–7, 4–6

== Team competitions ==
=== Billie Jean King Cup (1–3) ===
Edition	Stage	Date	Location	Against	Surface	Partner	Opponent	W/L	Score
2023	Z1 R/R	11 Apr 2023	Antalya, Turkey	Bulgaria	Clay	Antonia Ružić	Isabella Shinikova; Julia Terziyska	L	6–7^{(4)}, 6–4, 3–6
2023	Z1 R/R	12 Apr 2023	Antalya, Turkey	Serbia	Clay	Tara Würth	Olga Danilović; Katarina Kozarov	L	4–6, 1–6
2023	Z1 R/R	13 Apr 2023	Antalya, Turkey	Sweden	Clay	Antonia Ružić	Jacqueline Cabaj Awad; Kajsa Rinaldo Persson	L	5–7, 5–7
2023	Z1 R/R	14 Apr 2023	Antalya, Turkey	Norway	Clay	Petra Marčinko	Emilie Elde; Lilly Elida Håseth	W	6–2, 6–1

=== United Cup (0–1) ===
Group membership United Cup (0–1)	Matches by surface Hard (0–1)	Matches by type Doubles (0–1)	Matches by setting Outdoors (0–1)

Outcome	No.	Surface	Match type (partner)	Opponent nation	Opponent player(s)	Score
2025
27 December–5 January; RAC Arena, Perth, Australia; Group stage
Loss	1.	Hard	Mixed doubles (with Ivan Dodig)	Canada	(Canada) Leylah Fernandez / (Canada) Félix Auger-Aliassime	3–6, 4–6
