= 2024 Open delle Puglie =

- Date: 3–9 June
- Edition: 3rd
- Category: WTA 125
- Draw: 32S / 8D
- Prize money: $115,000
- Surface: Clay
- Location: Bari, Italy
- Venue: Circolo del Tennis Bari

Champions

Singles
- (Romania) Anca Todoni

Doubles
- (Kazakhstan) Anna Danilina / Irina Khromacheva
← 2023 ·	Open delle Puglie	· 2025 →

The 2024 Open delle Puglie was a professional women's tennis tournament played on outdoor clay courts. It was the third edition of the tournament and part of the 2024 WTA 125 tournaments, offering a total of $115,000 in prize money. It took place at the Circolo del Tennis at the Via Martinez in Bari, Italy between 3 and 9 June 2024.

== Singles entrants ==
=== Seeds ===
Country	Player	Rank^{1}	Seed
ARG	Nadia Podoroska	59	1
ITA	Lucia Bronzetti	67	2
ROU	Jaqueline Cristian	69	3
~~USA~~	~~Bernarda Pera~~	~~80~~	~~4~~
FRA	Varvara Gracheva	92	5
MEX	Renata Zarazúa	102	6
ESP	Marina Bassols Ribera	111	7
FRA	Fiona Ferro	126	8
SLO	Tamara Zidanšek	131	9

- ^{1} Rankings are as of 27 May 2024.

=== Other entrants ===
The following players received a wildcard into the singles main draw:

- (Italy) Nuria Brancaccio
- (Italy) Giorgia Pedone
- (Italy) Daria Raimondo
- (Italy) Camilla Rosatello

The following players received entry into the main draw through qualification:

- (Italy) Martina Colmegna
- (Kazakhstan) Zhibek Kulambayeva
- (Italy) Beatrice Ricci
- (Ukraine) Anastasiya Soboleva

The following player received entry as a lucky loser:

- (Bulgaria) Isabella Shinikova

=== Withdrawals ===
Before the tournament

- (Argentina) Paula Ormaechea → replaced by (Bulgaria) Isabella Shinikova

== Doubles entrants ==
=== Seeds ===
Country	Player	Country	Player	Rank^{1}	Seed
KAZ	Anna Danilina		Irina Khromacheva	101	1
USA	Quinn Gleason	CHN	Tang Qianhui	214	2

- ^{1} rankings as of 27 May 2024.

=== Other entrants ===
The following pair received a wildcard into the doubles main draw:

- (Italy) Eleonora Alvisi / (Italy) Beatrice Ricci

== Champions ==
=== Singles ===
- (Romania) Anca Todoni def. (Hungary) Panna Udvardy, 6–4, 6–0

=== Doubles ===
- (Kazakhstan) Anna Danilina / Irina Khromacheva def. (Italy) Angelica Moratelli / (Mexico) Renata Zarazúa 6–1, 6–3
