= 2024 Thailand Open 2 =

- Date: 16 – 22 September 2024
- Edition: 5th
- Category: WTA 250
- Draw: 32S / 16D
- Prize money: $267,082
- Surface: Hard / outdoor
- Location: Hua Hin, Prachuap Khiri Khan, Thailand
- Venue: True Arena Hua Hin

Champions

Singles
- (Slovakia) Rebecca Šramková

Doubles
- (Kazakhstan) Anna Danilina / Irina Khromacheva
| ← 2024 · | Hua Hin Championships | · 2025 → |

The 2024 Thailand Open 2 was a professional WTA tournament played on outdoor hard courts. It was the 5th edition of the Thailand Open as part of the WTA 250 tournaments of the 2024 WTA Tour. The event was a special second staging of the tournament for 2024 only, to fill a vacancy for a WTA 250 tournament in the fall tour calendar. It will take place at the True Arena Hua Hin in Hua Hin, Thailand, from 16 to 22 September 2024.

== Champions ==
=== Singles ===
- (Slovakia) Rebecca Šramková def. (Germany) Laura Siegemund 6–4, 6–4

=== Doubles ===
- (Kazakhstan) Anna Danilina / Irina Khromacheva def. (Hong Kong) Eudice Chong / (Japan) Moyuka Uchijima 6–4, 7–5

== Singles main draw entrants ==
=== Seeds ===
| Country | Player | Rank^{1} | Seed |
|---|---|---|---|
| UKR | Dayana Yastremska | 34 | 1 |
| CZE | Kateřina Siniaková | 36 | 2 |
| CHN | Wang Xinyu | 40 | 3 |
| POL | Magda Linette | 42 | 4 |
| CHN | Wang Xiyu | 53 | 5 |
| USA | Katie Volynets | 57 | 6 |
| JPN | Moyuka Uchijima | 64 | 7 |
| FRA | Varvara Gracheva | 66 | 8 |

- ^{1} Rankings as of 26 August 2024.

=== Other entrants ===
The following players received wildcards into the singles main draw:

- (Thailand) Thasaporn Naklo
- (Thailand) Lanlana Tararudee
- (China) Zheng Saisai

The following players received entry from the qualifying draw:

- (China) Gao Xinyu
- (Netherlands) Arianne Hartono
- Ksenia Laskutova
- Tatiana Prozorova
- (Thailand) Mananchaya Sawangkaew
- (China) Wei Sijia

=== Withdrawals ===
- (Spain) Jéssica Bouzas Maneiro → replaced by (Croatia) Jana Fett
- (Romania) Jaqueline Cristian → replaced by (Japan) Mai Hontama
- (United States) Sofia Kenin → replaced by (Spain) Rebeka Masarova
- (France) Chloé Paquet → replaced by (United States) Alycia Parks
- (Italy) Martina Trevisan → replaced by (Slovakia) Rebecca Šramková
- (China) Wang Yafan → replaced by (Australia) Taylah Preston

== Doubles main draw entrants ==
=== Seeds ===
| Country | Player | Country | Player | Rank^{1} | Seed |
|---|---|---|---|---|---|
| KAZ | Anna Danilina | | Irina Khromacheva | 73 | 1 |
| HUN | Tímea Babos | CZE | Anna Sisková | 133 | 2 |
| ITA | Angelica Moratelli | USA | Sabrina Santamaria | 149 | 3 |
| ITA | Camilla Rosatello | BEL | Kimberley Zimmermann | 174 | 4 |

- ^{1} Rankings as of 9 September 2024

=== Other entrants ===
The following pairs received wildcards into the doubles main draw:

- (Switzerland) Viktorija Golubic / (Thailand) Lanlana Tararudee
- (Thailand) Thasaporn Naklo / (Thailand) Bunyawi Thamchaiwat

The following pair received entry as alternates:

- (China) Ma Yexin / (China) Zheng Saisai

=== Withdrawals ===
- (Hungary) Anna Bondár / (Egypt) Mayar Sherif → replaced by (China) Ma Yexin / (China) Zheng Saisai
