= 2025 Open delle Puglie – Doubles =

Doubles
- 2025 Open delle Puglie

Final
- Champions: Maria Kozyreva; Iryna Shymanovich
- Runners-up: (United States) Quinn Gleason (Brazil) Ingrid Martins
- Score: 3–6, 6–4, [10–7]

Events
Singles	Doubles
← 2024 ·	Open delle Puglie	· 2026 →

Anna Danilina and Irina Khromacheva were the reigning champions, but did not participate this year.

Maria Kozyreva and Iryna Shymanovich won the title, defeating Quinn Gleason and Ingrid Martins 3–6, 6–4, [10–7] in the final.

== Seeds ==
1. (United States) Quinn Gleason / (Brazil) Ingrid Martins (final)
2. (Netherlands) Eva Vedder / (Belgium) Kimberley Zimmermann (quarterfinals)

== Draw ==
=== Key ===
- Q = Qualifier
- WC = Wild card
- LL = Lucky loser
- Alt = Alternate
- ITF = ITF entry
- PR = Protected ranking
- SR = Special ranking
- SE = Special exempt
- JE = Junior exempt
- JR = Junior Accelerator Programme entrant
- CO = College Accelerator Programme entrant
- NG = Next Gen Accelerator Program entrant
- w/o = Walkover
- r = Retired
- d = Defaulted

=== Draw ===
Quarterfinals
1	(United States) Q Gleason (Brazil) I Martins	6	2	[13]
(Australia) A Sharma (Liechtenstein) K von Deichmann	3	6	[11]
(United States) V Lepchenko; E Yashina	3	4
WC	(Italy) V Paganetti (Italy) F Urgesi	6	6
M Kozyreva; I Shymanovich	7^{9}	6
(Spain) Y Cavallé Reimers (Venezuela) A Gámiz	6^{7}	3
(Poland) M Chwalińska (Brazil) L Pigossi	6	7
2	(Netherlands) E Vedder (Belgium) K Zimmermann	3	5

Semifinals
1	(United States) Q Gleason (Brazil) I Martins	6	5	[11]
WC	(Italy) V Paganetti (Italy) F Urgesi	4	7	[9]
M Kozyreva; I Shymanovich	w/o
(Poland) M Chwalińska (Brazil) L Pigossi

Final
1	(United States) Q Gleason (Brazil) I Martins	6	4	[7]
M Kozyreva; I Shymanovich	3	6	[10]
