= 2023 Open delle Puglie =

- Date: 4–10 September
- Edition: 2nd
- Category: WTA 125
- Draw: 32S / 16D
- Prize money: $115,000
- Surface: Clay
- Location: Bari, Italy
- Venue: Circolo del Tennis Bari

Champions

Singles
- (Slovenia) Tamara Zidanšek

Doubles
- (Poland) Katarzyna Kawa / (Czech Republic) Anna Sisková
← 2022 ·	Open delle Puglie	· 2024 →

The 2023 Open delle Puglie was a professional women's tennis tournament played on outdoor clay courts. It was the second edition of the tournament and part of the 2023 WTA 125 tournaments, offering a total of $115,000 in prize money. It took place at the Circolo del Tennis at the Via Martinez in Bari, Italy between 4 and 10 September 2023.

== Singles entrants ==
=== Seeds ===
Country	Player	Rank^{1}	Seed
FRA	Alizé Cornet	74	1
ROU	Jaqueline Cristian	99	2
ESP	Aliona Bolsova	113	3
ITA	Sara Errani	115	4
SLO	Tamara Zidanšek	118	5
BRA	Laura Pigossi	131	6
ESP	Marina Bassols Ribera	136	7
GER	Noma Noha Akugue	142	8

- ^{1} Rankings are as of 28 August 2023.

=== Other entrants ===
The following players received a wildcard into the singles main draw:

- (Italy) Vittoria Paganetti
- (Italy) Giorgia Pedone
- (Italy) Jennifer Ruggeri

The following player entered the main draw through protected ranking:

- (Romania) Patricia Maria Țig

The following players received entry into the main draw through qualification:

- (United Kingdom) Freya Christie
- (Poland) Katarzyna Kawa
- (Kazakhstan) Zhibek Kulambayeva
- (Italy) Angelica Moratelli

== Doubles entrants ==
=== Seeds ===
Country	Player	Country	Player	Rank^{1}	Seed
ESP	Aliona Bolsova	VEN	Andrea Gámiz	160	1
SLO	Dalila Jakupović		Irina Khromacheva	189	2
ITA	Angelica Moratelli	ITA	Camilla Rosatello	207	3
POL	Katarzyna Kawa	CZE	Anna Sisková	214	4

- ^{1} rankings as of 28 August 2023.

=== Other entrants ===
The following pair received a wildcard into the doubles main draw:

- (Italy) Giorgia Pedone / (Italy) Jennifer Ruggeri

== Champions ==
=== Singles ===
- (Slovenia) Tamara Zidanšek def. (Slovakia) Rebecca Šramková 3–6, 7–5, 6–1

=== Doubles ===
- (Poland) Katarzyna Kawa / (Czech Republic) Anna Sisková def. (Greece) Valentini Grammatikopoulou / (France) Elixane Lechemia 6–1, 6–2
