= 2024 Thailand Open 2 – Singles =

Singles
- 2024 Thailand Open 2

Final
- Champion: (Slovakia) Rebecca Šramková
- Runner-up: (Germany) Laura Siegemund
- Score: 6–4, 6–4

Details
- Draw: 32 (6 Q / 4 WC )
- Seeds: 8

Events
Singles	Doubles
- Hua Hin Championships

Rebecca Šramková defeated Laura Siegemund in the final, 6–4, 6–4 to win the singles tennis title at the 2024 Thailand Open 2. It was her first WTA Tour singles title.

The second round match between Siegemund and Wang Xiyu lasted 4 hours and 9 minutes, making it the first match to break the four-hour mark since the 2011 Australian Open fourth round match between Francesca Schiavone and Svetlana Kuznetsova, and the fifth-longest on the WTA Tour in the Open Era.

Diana Shnaider was the reigning champion, but chose to compete in Seoul instead.

== Seeds ==
1. (Ukraine) Dayana Yastremska (first round)
2. (Czech Republic) Kateřina Siniaková (second round)
3. (China) Wang Xinyu (second round)
4. (Poland) Magda Linette (second round)
5. (China) Wang Xiyu (second round)
6. (United States) Katie Volynets (second round)
7. (Japan) Moyuka Uchijima (first round)
8. (France) Varvara Gracheva (second round, withdrew)

== Draw ==
Key

- Q = Qualifier
- WC = Wild card
- LL = Lucky loser
- Alt = Alternate
- ITF = ITF entry
- PR = Protected ranking
- SR = Special ranking
- SE = Special exempt
- JE = Junior exempt
- JR = Junior Accelerator Programme entrant
- CO = College Accelerator Programme entrant
- NG = Next Gen Accelerator Program entrant
- w/o = Walkover
- r = Retired
- d = Defaulted

=== Finals ===
Semifinals
Q	(Netherlands) Arianne Hartono	3	3
(Germany) Laura Siegemund	6	6
(Slovakia) Rebecca Šramková	6	6
(Slovenia) Tamara Zidanšek	4	2

Final
(Germany) Laura Siegemund	4	4
(Slovakia) Rebecca Šramková	6	6

=== Top half ===
First round
1	(Ukraine) D Yastremska	6^{4}	5
(Japan) M Hontama	7^{7}	7
WC	(Thailand) L Tararudee	6	6
WC	(Thailand) T Naklo	0	1
Q	(China) S Wei	3	2
Q	(China) X Gao	6	6
Q	(Netherlands) A Hartono	6	6
7	(Japan) M Uchijima	1	1
3	(China) Xin Wang	6	6
(Egypt) M Sherif	2	4
(Hungary) A Bondár	6	6^{2}	5
(Spain) R Masarova	3	7^{7}	7
(United States) A Parks	4	3
(Germany) L Siegemund	6	6
(Switzerland) V Golubic	5	1
5	(China) Xiy Wang	7	6

Second round
(Japan) M Hontama	2	6	6
WC	(Thailand) L Tararudee	6	4	1
Q	(China) X Gao	1	6	2
Q	(Netherlands) A Hartono	6	4	6
3	(China) Xin Wang	6^{6}	6	5
(Spain) R Masarova	7^{8}	3	7
(Germany) L Siegemund	7^{7}	4	7^{7}
5	(China) Xiy Wang	6^{3}	6	6^{1}

Quarterfinals
(Japan) M Hontama	6	2	3
Q	(Netherlands) A Hartono	4	6	6
(Spain) R Masarova	3	4
(Germany) L Siegemund	6	6

Semifinals
Q	(Netherlands) A Hartono	3	3
(Germany) L Siegemund	6	6

=== Bottom half ===
First round
8	(France) V Gracheva	6	6
(Australia) T Preston	1	4
WC	(China) S Zheng	6	3	3
(Croatia) J Fett	2	6	6
Q	(Thailand) M Sawangkaew	2	6	4
(Slovakia) R Šramková	6	2	6
(Ukraine) L Tsurenko	2	5
4	(Poland) M Linette	6	7
6	(United States) K Volynets	7^{7}	4	6
(Denmark) C Tauson	6^{2}	6	3
(Slovenia) T Zidanšek	2	6	6
Q	T Prozorova	6	3	1
(Argentina) N Podoroska	6	6
Q	K Laskutova	1	0
(Australia) Ar Rodionova	5	1
2	(Czech Republic) K Siniaková	7	6

Second round
8	(France) V Gracheva
(Croatia) J Fett	w/o
(Slovakia) R Šramková	7^{7}	6
4	(Poland) M Linette	6^{5}	4
6	(United States) K Volynets	6	4	4
(Slovenia) T Zidanšek	3	6	6
(Argentina) N Podoroska	6	6
2	(Czech Republic) K Siniaková	3	3

Quarterfinals
(Croatia) J Fett	6	4	1
(Slovakia) R Šramková	4	6	6
(Slovenia) T Zidanšek	4	7^{7}	7^{7}
(Argentina) N Podoroska	6	6^{3}	6^{3}

Semifinals
(Slovakia) R Šramková	6	6
(Slovenia) T Zidanšek	4	2

== Qualifying ==
=== Seeds ===
1. (Australia) Taylah Preston (moved to main draw)
2. (Netherlands) Arianne Hartono (qualified)
3. (Slovenia) Tamara Zidanšek (moved to main draw)
4. (China) Wei Sijia (qualified)
5. (Thailand) Mananchaya Sawangkaew (qualified)
6. (China) Ma Yexin (qualifying competition)
7. (China) Gao Xinyu (qualified)
8. (Chinese Taipei) Liang En-shuo (qualifying competition)
9. Tatiana Prozorova (qualified)
10. Ksenia Laskutova (qualified)
11. (Thailand) Peangtarn Plipuech (first round)
12. (Belgium) Lara Salden (qualifying competition, retired)

=== Qualifiers ===
1. Ksenia Laskutova
2. (Netherlands) Arianne Hartono
3. Tatiana Prozorova
4. (China) Wei Sijia
5. (Thailand) Mananchaya Sawangkaew
6. (China) Gao Xinyu

=== Qualifying draw ===
==== First qualifier ====
Qualifying competition
	(China) Tang Qianhui	6	4	0^{r}
10	Ksenia Laskutova	4	6	3

==== Second qualifier ====
First round
2	(Netherlands) Arianne Hartono	6	6
WC	(Ukraine) Maryna Kolb	0	0
(Ukraine) Nadiia Kolb	3	3
12	(Belgium) Lara Salden	6	6

Qualifying competition
2	(Netherlands) Arianne Hartono	5	6	2
12	(Belgium) Lara Salden	7	3	0^{r}

==== Third qualifier ====
First round				Qualifying competition
				WC	(Thailand) Viera Deeperm	0	2
				9	Tatiana Prozorova	6	6
	(Colombia) Yuliana Lizarazo	0	1	9	Tatiana Prozorova	6	6
9	Tatiana Prozorova	6	6

==== Fourth qualifier ====
First round
4	(China) Wei Sijia	6	3	7
WC	(Thailand) Bunyawi Thamchaiwat	4	6	5
(Indonesia) Priska Madelyn Nugroho	7^{7}	6
11	(Thailand) Peangtarn Plipuech	6^{2}	4

Qualifying competition
4	(China) Wei Sijia	6	7
(Indonesia) Priska Madelyn Nugroho	4	5

==== Fifth qualifier ====
First round
5	(Thailand) Mananchaya Sawangkaew	6	6
WC	(India) Prarthana Thombare	0	3
WC	(Thailand) Kamonwan Yodpetch	1	2
8	(Chinese Taipei) Liang En-shuo	6	6

Qualifying competition
5	(Thailand) Mananchaya Sawangkaew	1	6	6
8	(Chinese Taipei) Liang En-shuo	6	4	2

==== Sixth qualifier ====
First round
6	(China) Ma Yexin	7	6
(United Kingdom) Freya Christie	5	1
WC	(China) Hou Yanan	0	0
7	(China) Gao Xinyu	6	6

Qualifying competition
6	(China) Ma Yexin	3	7	2
7	(China) Gao Xinyu	6	5	6
