= 2022 Open Delle Puglie =

2022 Open delle Puglie
- Date: 5–11 September
- Edition: 1st
- Category: WTA 125
- Draw: 32S / 16D
- Prize money: $115,000
- Surface: Clay
- Location: Bari, Italy
- Venue: Circolo del Tennis Bari

Champions

Singles
- (Austria) Julia Grabher

Doubles
- (Italy) Elisabetta Cocciaretto / (Serbia) Olga Danilović
Open delle Puglie	· 2023 →

The 2022 Open delle Puglie was a professional tennis tournament played on outdoor clay courts. It was the first edition of the tournament and part of the 2022 WTA 125 tournaments, offering a total of $115,000 in prize money. It took place at the Circolo del Tennis at the Via Martinez in Bari, Italy between 5 and 11 September 2022.

== Singles entrants ==
=== Seeds ===
Country	Player	Rank^{1}	Seed
HUN	Panna Udvardy	78	1
MNE	Danka Kovinić	80	2
GER	Tatjana Maria	85	3
BEL	Maryna Zanevska	97	4
ITA	Elisabetta Cocciaretto	99	5
BRA	Laura Pigossi	100	6
FRA	Harmony Tan	112	7
SRB	Olga Danilović	114	8

- ^{1} Rankings are as of 29 August 2022.

=== Other entrants ===
The following players received a wildcard into the singles main draw:

- (Italy) Vittoria Paganetti
- (Italy) Matilde Paoletti
- (Italy) Lisa Pigato
- (Italy) Lucrezia Stefanini

The following players received entry into the main draw through qualification:

- (Italy) Nuria Brancaccio
- (Argentina) Paula Ormaechea
- (Romania) Andreea Roșca
- (Netherlands) Eva Vedder

The following players entered the main draw as lucky losers:

- (Venezuela) Andrea Gámiz
- (Romania) Ioana Loredana Roșca

=== Withdrawals ===
Before the tournament

- Elina Avanesyan → replaced by (Ukraine) Kateryna Baindl
- (Romania) Ana Bogdan → replaced by (Spain) Rebeka Masarova
- (Italy) Lucia Bronzetti → replaced by (Brazil) Carolina Alves
- (France) Clara Burel → replaced by (Romania) Ioana Loredana Roșca
- (Germany) Jule Niemeier → replaced by (Venezuela) Andrea Gámiz
- (Italy) Jasmine Paolini → replaced by (Australia) Jaimee Fourlis
- (Spain) Nuria Párrizas Díaz → replaced by (Hungary) Réka Luca Jani
- (Egypt) Mayar Sherif → replaced by (Slovenia) Dalila Jakupović
- (Bulgaria) Viktoriya Tomova → replaced by (Switzerland) Ylena In-Albon
- (China) Zheng Qinwen → replaced by (Cyprus) Raluca Șerban

== Doubles entrants ==
=== Seeds ===
Country	Player	Country	Player	Rank^{1}	Seed
VEN	Andrea Gámiz	NED	Eva Vedder	240	1
POL	Paula Kania-Choduń	CZE	Renata Voráčová	242	2
	Angelina Gabueva	BRA	Laura Pigossi	252	3
BRA	Carolina Alves	ARG	María Lourdes Carlé	280	4

- ^{1} rankings as of 29 August 2022.

=== Other entrants ===
The following pair received a wildcard into the doubles main draw:

- (Italy) Vittoria Paganetti / (Italy) Lucrezia Stefanini

== Champions ==
=== Singles ===
- (Austria) Julia Grabher def. (Italy) Nuria Brancaccio 6–4, 6–2

=== Doubles ===
- (Italy) Elisabetta Cocciaretto / (Serbia) Olga Danilović def. (Venezuela) Andrea Gámiz / (Netherlands) Eva Vedder 6–2, 6–3
