= 2025 Open delle Puglie – Singles =

Singles
- 2025 Open delle Puglie

Final
- Champion: (Romania) Anca Todoni
- Runner-up: (Hungary) Anna Bondár
- Score: 6–7^{(4–7)}, 6–4, 6–4

Details
- Draw: 32 (4 WC)
- Seeds: 8

Events
Singles	Doubles
← 2024 ·	Open delle Puglie	· 2026 →

Anca Todoni was the defending champion and successfully retained the singles title at the 2025 Open delle Puglie, defeating Anna Bondár in the final, 6–7^{(4–7)}, 6–4, 6–4.

== Seeds ==
1. Polina Kudermetova (first round)
2. (Bulgaria) Viktoriya Tomova (quarterfinals)
3. (Hungary) Anna Bondár (final)
4. (Romania) Anca Todoni (champion)
5. (Switzerland) Jil Teichmann (quarterfinals)
6. (Ukraine) Anhelina Kalinina (first round, retired)
7. (Spain) Nuria Párrizas Díaz (semifinals)
8. (United States) Varvara Lepchenko (first round)

== Draw ==
=== Key ===
- Q = Qualifier
- WC = Wild card
- LL = Lucky loser
- Alt = Alternate
- ITF = ITF entry
- PR = Protected ranking
- SR = Special ranking
- SE = Special exempt
- JE = Junior exempt
- JR = Junior Accelerator Programme entrant
- CO = College Accelerator Programme entrant
- NG = Next Gen Accelerator Program entrant
- w/o = Walkover
- r = Retired
- d = Defaulted

=== Finals ===
Semifinals
(Liechtenstein) Kathinka von Deichmann	3	5
3	(Hungary) Anna Bondár	6	7
4	(Romania) Anca Todoni	6	6
7	(Spain) Nuria Párrizas Díaz	2	4

Final
3	(Hungary) Anna Bondár	7^{7}	4	4
4	(Romania) Anca Todoni	6^{4}	6	6

=== Top half ===
First round
1/WC	P Kudermetova	1	1
Q	(Australia) A Sharma	6	6
Q	(Japan) M Yamaguchi	4	3
(Liechtenstein) K von Deichmann	6	6
(Czech Republic) B Palicová	2	3
(Poland) M Chwalińska	6	6
(Romania) A Bogdan	6	6
8	(United States) V Lepchenko	3	3
3	(Hungary) A Bondár	6	6
Alt	(Japan) H Kaji	1	2
(France) T Andrianjafitrimo	1	6	6
WC	(Italy) F Urgesi	6	3	4
Q	(Spain) Á Fita Boluda	7^{7}	6
(Australia) Ar Rodionova	6^{3}	3
WC	(Italy) V Paganetti	1	2
5	(Switzerland) J Teichmann	6	6

Second round
Q	(Australia) A Sharma	1^{r}
(Liechtenstein) K von Deichmann	2
(Poland) M Chwalińska
(Romania) A Bogdan	w/o
3	(Hungary) A Bondár	7	6
(France) T Andrianjafitrimo	5	4
Q	(Spain) Á Fita Boluda	6	1	6^{5}
5	(Switzerland) J Teichmann	3	6	7^{7}

Quarterfinals
(Liechtenstein) K von Deichmann	4	6	6
(Romania) A Bogdan	6	3	3
3	(Hungary) A Bondár	6	4	6
5	(Switzerland) J Teichmann	3	6	3

Semifinals
(Liechtenstein) K von Deichmann	3	5
3	(Hungary) A Bondár	6	7

=== Bottom half ===
First round
6	(Ukraine) A Kalinina	6^{6}	3^{r}
I Shymanovich	7^{8}	2
(Austria) S Kraus	6	6
WC	(Italy) E Alvisi	1	2
(Czech Republic) D Šalková	6	6
(Brazil) L Pigossi	2	1
T Prozorova	4	2
4	(Romania) A Todoni	6	6
7	(Spain) N Párrizas Díaz	6	6
PR	A Korneeva	4	4
(Japan) E Shibahara	6	7
(Austria) J Grabher	2	5
(France) E Jacquemot	6	6
Q	(Netherlands) E Vedder	1	1
(Spain) G Maristany	0	2
2	(Bulgaria) V Tomova	6	6

Second round
I Shymanovich	2	6	6
(Austria) S Kraus	6	4	1
(Czech Republic) D Šalková	5	6^{4}
4	(Romania) A Todoni	7	7^{7}
7	(Spain) N Párrizas Díaz	6	4
(Japan) E Shibahara	0	2^{r}
(France) E Jacquemot	6	3	4
2	(Bulgaria) V Tomova	2	6	6

Quarterfinals
I Shymanovich	4	0
4	(Romania) A Todoni	6	6
7	(Spain) N Párrizas Díaz	6	5	6
2	(Bulgaria) V Tomova	3	7	3

Semifinals
4	(Romania) A Todoni	6	6
7	(Spain) N Párrizas Díaz	2	4

== Qualifying ==
=== Seeds ===
1. (Australia) Astra Sharma (qualified)
2. (Lithuania) Justina Mikulskytė (qualifying competition)
3. (Japan) Haruka Kaji (moved to main draw)
4. (Spain) Ángela Fita Boluda (qualified)

=== Qualifiers ===
1. (Australia) Astra Sharma
2. (Japan) Mei Yamaguchi
3. (Netherlands) Eva Vedder
4. (Spain) Ángela Fita Boluda

=== Qualifying draw ===
==== First qualifier ====
Qualifying competition
1	(Australia) Astra Sharma	6	6
WC	(Italy) Viola Turini	1	1

==== Second qualifier ====
Qualifying competition
2	(Lithuania) Justina Mikulskytė	5	1
	(Japan) Mei Yamaguchi	7	6

==== Third qualifier ====
Qualifying competition
Alt	(Israel) Lina Glushko	1	6	0
	(Netherlands) Eva Vedder	6	3	6

==== Fourth qualifier ====
Qualifying competition
4	(Spain) Ángela Fita Boluda	6	3	6
WC	(Italy) Martina Colmegna	3	6	3
