= 2024 Open delle Puglie – Singles =

Singles
- 2024 Open delle Puglie

Final
- Champion: (Romania) Anca Todoni
- Runner-up: (Hungary) Panna Udvardy
- Score: 6–4, 6–0

Details
- Draw: 32 (4 WC)
- Seeds: 8

Events
| Singles | Doubles |
| ← 2023 · | Open delle Puglie | · 2025 → |

Anca Todoni won the singles title at the 2024 Open delle Puglie, defeating Panna Udvardy in the final, 6–4, 6–0.

Tamara Zidanšek was the defending champion, but lost in the semifinals to Udvardy.

== Seeds ==
1. (Argentina) Nadia Podoroska (semifinals)
2. (Italy) Lucia Bronzetti (first round)
3. (Romania) Jaqueline Cristian (second round)
4. (United States) Bernarda Pera (withdrew)
5. (Italy) Martina Trevisan (quarterfinals)
6. (Mexico) Renata Zarazúa (quarterfinals)
7. (Spain) Marina Bassols Ribera (first round)
8. (France) Fiona Ferro (first round)
9. (Slovenia) Tamara Zidanšek (semifinals)

== Draw ==
=== Key ===
- Q = Qualifier
- WC = Wild card
- LL = Lucky loser
- Alt = Alternate
- SE = Special exempt
- PR = Protected ranking
- ITF = ITF entry
- JE = Junior exempt
- w/o = Walkover
- r = Retired
- d = Defaulted
- SR = Special ranking

=== Finals ===
Semifinals
1 | (Argentina) Nadia Podoroska | 6 | 4 | 5
(Romania) Anca Todoni | 2 | 6 | 7
9 | (Slovenia) Tamara Zidanšek | 6 | 6^{5} | 4
(Hungary) Panna Udvardy | 4 | 7^{7} | 6

Final
(Romania) Anca Todoni | 6 | 6
(Hungary) Panna Udvardy | 4 | 0

=== Top half ===
First round
1 | (Argentina) N Podoroska | 6 | 6
(Romania) C Dinu | 2 | 3
(United States) L Chirico | 6 | 6
(Portugal) F Jorge | 3 | 3
Q | (Italy) B Ricci | 7^{7} | 6
WC | (Italy) N Brancaccio | 6^{4} | 1
(China) X You | 6 | 6
7 | (Spain) M Bassols Ribera | 0 | 3
3 | (Romania) J Cristian | 6 | 6
WC | (Italy) C Rosatello | 2 | 3
(Greece) S Sakellaridi | 0 | 0
(Germany) E Lys | 6 | 6
(United States) E Kalieva | 4 | 7 | 6
(Romania) I Bara | 6 | 5 | 2
(Romania) A Todoni | 6 | 6
8 | (France) F Ferro | 3 | 0

Second round
1 | (Argentina) N Podoroska | 1 | 7^{7} | 6
(United States) L Chirico | 6 | 6^{4} | 2
Q | (Italy) B Ricci | 7^{7} | 3 | 6
(China) X You | 6^{5} | 6 | 4
3 | (Romania) J Cristian | 7^{7} | 4 | 3
(Germany) E Lys | 6^{3} | 6 | 6
(United States) E Kalieva | 4 | 2
(Romania) A Todoni | 6 | 6

Quarterfinals
1 | (Argentina) N Podoroska | 6 | 6
Q | (Italy) B Ricci | 2 | 3
(Germany) E Lys | 2 | 5
(Romania) A Todoni | 6 | 7

Semifinals
1 | (Argentina) N Podoroska | 6 | 4 | 5
(Romania) A Todoni | 2 | 6 | 7

=== Bottom half ===
First round
5 | (Italy) M Trevisan | 6 | 7^{10}
(Lithuania) J Mikulskytė | 3 | 6^{8}
(United States) A Li | 6 | 6
LL | (Bulgaria) I Shinikova | 1 | 4
(Ukraine) Y Starodubtseva | 2 | 1
(Turkey) İ Öz | 6 | 6
WC | (Italy) D Raimondo | 0 | 0
9 | (Slovenia) T Zidanšek | 6 | 6
6 | (Mexico) R Zarazúa | 6 | 6
Q | (Kazakhstan) Z Kulambayeva | 3 | 2
(Ukraine) K Zavatska | 6 | 6
Q | (Italy) M Colmegna | 2 | 4
WC | (Italy) G Pedone | 6 | 5 | 5
(Hungary) P Udvardy | 2 | 7 | 7
Q | (Ukraine) A Soboleva | 7 | 6
2 | (Italy) L Bronzetti | 5 | 4

Second round
5 | (Italy) M Trevisan | 6 | 3 | 6
(United States) A Li | 3 | 6 | 4
(Turkey) İ Öz | 5 | 6^{2}
9 | (Slovenia) T Zidanšek | 7 | 7^{7}
6 | (Mexico) R Zarazúa | 6 | 6
(Ukraine) K Zavatska | 1 | 2
(Hungary) P Udvardy | 6 | 6
Q | (Ukraine) A Soboleva | 0 | 1

Quarterfinals
5 | (Italy) M Trevisan | 6 | 3 | 6^{4}
9 | (Slovenia) T Zidanšek | 4 | 6 | 7^{7}
6 | (Mexico) R Zarazúa | 6^{6} | 6^{5}
(Hungary) P Udvardy | 7^{8} | 7^{7}

Semifinals
9 | (Slovenia) T Zidanšek | 6 | 6^{5} | 4
(Hungary) P Udvardy | 4 | 7^{7} | 6

== Qualifying ==
=== Seeds ===
1. (Ukraine) Anastasiya Soboleva (qualified)
2. (Greece) Sapfo Sakellaridi (moved to main draw)
3. (Bulgaria) Isabella Shinikova (qualifying competition, lucky loser)
4. (Australia) Jaimee Fourlis (qualifying competition)

=== Qualifiers ===
1. (Ukraine) Anastasiya Soboleva
2. (Kazakhstan) Zhibek Kulambayeva
3. (Italy) Martina Colmegna
4. (Italy) Beatrice Ricci

=== Lucky loser ===
1. (Bulgaria) Isabella Shinikova

=== Qualifying draw ===
==== First qualifier ====
| Qualifying competition |
| 1 | (Ukraine) Anastasiya Soboleva | 7 | 4 | 7 |
| | (Italy) Miriana Tona | 5 | 6 | 5 |

==== Second qualifier ====
| Qualifying competition |
| Alt | (Kazakhstan) Zhibek Kulambayeva | 6 | 6 |
| WC | (Italy) Eleonora Alvisi | 1 | 2 |

==== Third qualifier ====
| Qualifying competition |
| 3 | (Bulgaria) Isabella Shinikova | 3 | 4 |
| | (Italy) Martina Colmegna | 6 | 6 |

==== Fourth qualifier ====
| Qualifying competition |
| 4 | (Australia) Jaimee Fourlis | 2 | 2 |
| WC | (Italy) Beatrice Ricci | 6 | 6 |
