= 2022 Open Delle Puglie – Singles =

Singles
- 2022 Open delle Puglie

Final
- Champion: (Austria) Julia Grabher
- Runner-up: (Italy) Nuria Brancaccio
- Score: 6–4, 6–2

Details
- Draw: 32 (4 WC)
- Seeds: 8

Events
Singles	Doubles
Open delle Puglie	· 2023 →

This was the first edition of the tournament.

Julia Grabher won the title, defeating Nuria Brancaccio 6–4, 6–2 in the final.

== Seeds ==
1. (Hungary) Panna Udvardy (quarterfinals)
2. (Montenegro) Danka Kovinić (second round)
3. (Germany) Tatjana Maria (quarterfinals)
4. (Belgium) Maryna Zanevska (first round, retired)
5. (Italy) Elisabetta Cocciaretto (quarterfinals)
6. (Brazil) Laura Pigossi (second round)
7. (France) Harmony Tan (first round)
8. (Serbia) Olga Danilović (first round)

== Draw ==
=== Key ===
- Q = Qualifier
- WC = Wild card
- LL = Lucky loser
- Alt = Alternate
- SE = Special exempt
- PR = Protected ranking
- ITF = ITF entry
- JE = Junior exempt
- w/o = Walkover
- r = Retired
- d = Defaulted
- SR = Special ranking

=== Finals ===
Semifinals
(Austria) Julia Grabher	6	6
(Hungary) Réka Luca Jani	4	1
Q	(Italy) Nuria Brancaccio	3	6	6
WC	(Italy) Matilde Paoletti	6	2	4

Final
(Austria) Julia Grabher	6	6
Q	(Italy) Nuria Brancaccio	4	2

=== Top half ===
First round
1	(Hungary) P Udvardy	6	6
(Brazil) C Alves	3	0
(Australia) J Fourlis	6	2	0
(Slovakia) AK Schmiedlová	4	6	6
WC	(Italy) L Stefanini	3	2
(Austria) J Grabher	6	6
(South Korea) S-j Jang	6	6
8	(Serbia) O Danilović	4	3
4	(Belgium) M Zanevska	0	0^{r}
(Romania) A Cadanțu-Ignatik	6	0
(Slovenia) D Jakupović	5^{r}
(Hungary) RL Jani	5
(Argentina) ML Carlé	4	6	2
(Italy) S Errani	6	0	6
(Cyprus) R Șerban	6^{5}	3
5	(Italy) E Cocciaretto	7^{7}	6

Second round
1	(Hungary) P Udvardy	7^{7}	6
(Slovakia) AK Schmiedlová	6^{1}	3
(Austria) J Grabher	7	6^{3}	6
(South Korea) S-j Jang	5	7^{7}	1
(Romania) A Cadanțu-Ignatik	6	3	3
(Hungary) RL Jani	2	6	6
(Italy) S Errani	3	0
5	(Italy) E Cocciaretto	6	6

Quarterfinals
1	(Hungary) P Udvardy	6	4	1
(Austria) J Grabher	4	6	6
(Hungary) RL Jani	3	6	7^{7}
5	(Italy) E Cocciaretto	6	1	6^{5}

Semifinals
(Austria) J Grabher	6	6
(Hungary) RL Jani	4	1

=== Bottom half ===
First round
6	(Brazil) L Pigossi	6	6
WC	(Italy) V Paganetti	2	4
Q	(Italy) N Brancaccio	2	6	6
(Switzerland) Y In-Albon	6	1	4
LL	(Venezuela) A Gámiz	6	6
LL	(Romania) IL Roșca	2	4
WC	(Italy) L Pigato	3	4
3	(Germany) T Maria	6	6
7	(France) H Tan	2	0
WC	(Italy) M Paoletti	6	6
Q	(Romania) A Roșca	6	2	2
Q	(Argentina) P Ormaechea	3	6	6
Q	(Netherlands) E Vedder	6^{5}	6	6
(Spain) R Masarova	7^{7}	1	2
(Ukraine) K Baindl	4	7^{7}	6^{6}
2	(Montenegro) D Kovinić	6	6^{3}	7^{8}

Second round
6	(Brazil) L Pigossi	5	3
Q	(Italy) N Brancaccio	7	6
LL	(Venezuela) A Gámiz	6	3	4
3	(Germany) T Maria	4	6	6
WC	(Italy) M Paoletti	6	6
Q	(Argentina) P Ormaechea	4	4
Q	(Netherlands) E Vedder	6	6
2	(Montenegro) D Kovinić	3	3

Quarterfinals
Q	(Italy) N Brancaccio	7	6
3	(Germany) T Maria	5	1
WC	(Italy) M Paoletti	4	6	6
Q	(Netherlands) E Vedder	6	3	2

Semifinals
Q	(Italy) N Brancaccio	3	6	6
WC	(Italy) M Paoletti	6	2	4

== Qualifying ==
=== Seeds ===
1. (Cyprus) Raluca Șerban (moved to the main draw)
2. (Slovenia) Dalila Jakupović (moved to the main draw)
3. (Argentina) Paula Ormaechea (qualified)
4. Ekaterina Makarova (qualifying competition)
5. (Netherlands) Eva Vedder (qualified)
6. (Romania) Andreea Roșca (qualified)
7. (Italy) Nuria Brancaccio (qualified)
8. (Italy) Diletta Cherubini (qualifying competition)

=== Qualifiers ===
1. (Romania) Andreea Roșca
2. (Italy) Nuria Brancaccio
3. (Argentina) Paula Ormaechea
4. (Netherlands) Eva Vedder

=== Lucky losers ===
1. (Venezuela) Andrea Gámiz
2. (Romania) Ioana Loredana Roșca

=== Draw ===
==== First qualifier ====
Qualifying competition
Alt	(Venezuela) Andrea Gámiz	3	5
6	(Romania) Andreea Roșca	6	7

==== Second qualifier ====
Qualifying competition
Alt	(Romania) Ioana Loredana Roșca	0	1
7/WC	(Italy) Nuria Brancaccio	6	6

==== Third qualifier ====
Qualifying competition
3	(Argentina) Paula Ormaechea	6	6
8/WC	(Italy) Diletta Cherubini	2	2

==== Fourth qualifier ====
Qualifying competition
4	Ekaterina Makarova	3	7^{7}	2
5	(Netherlands) Eva Vedder	6	6^{5}	6
