= 2022 Open Delle Puglie – Doubles =

Doubles
- 2022 Open delle Puglie

Final
- Champions: (Italy) Elisabetta Cocciaretto (Serbia) Olga Danilović
- Runners-up: (Venezuela) Andrea Gámiz (Netherlands) Eva Vedder
- Score: 6–2, 6–3

Events
Singles	Doubles
Open delle Puglie	· 2023 →

Elisabetta Cocciaretto and Olga Danilović won the title, defeating Andrea Gámiz and Eva Vedder 6–2, 6–3 in the final.

This was the first edition of the tournament.

== Seeds ==
1. (Venezuela) Andrea Gámiz / (Netherlands) Eva Vedder (final)
2. (Poland) Paula Kania-Choduń / (Czech Republic) Renata Voráčová (quarterfinals)
3. Angelina Gabueva / (Brazil) Laura Pigossi (quarterfinals)
4. (Brazil) Carolina Alves / (Argentina) María Lourdes Carlé (first round)

== Draw ==
=== Key ===
- Q = Qualifier
- WC = Wild card
- LL = Lucky loser
- Alt = Alternate
- SE = Special exempt
- PR = Protected ranking
- ITF = ITF entry
- JE = Junior exempt
- w/o = Walkover
- r = Retired
- d = Defaulted
- SR = Special ranking

=== Draw ===
First round
(Brazil) I Gamarra Martins (India) P Thombare	6	2	[10]
(Switzerland) Y In-Albon (Hungary) RL Jani	2	6	[8]
4	(Brazil) C Alves (Argentina) ML Carlé	6^{4}	4
(Italy) M Paoletti (Italy) L Pigato	7^{7}	6
(Australia) J Fourlis (Austria) J Grabher
(Romania) A Roșca (Romania) IL Roșca	w/o
(Italy) E Cocciaretto (Serbia) O Danilović	w/o
WC	(Italy) V Paganetti (Italy) L Stefanini
(Italy) N Brancaccio (Italy) D Cherubini	6^{4}	2
3	A Gabueva (Brazil) L Pigossi	7^{7}	6
(Romania) A Prisăcariu (Bosnia and Herzegovina) A Wagner	0	4
A Fomina-Klotz (Germany) J Lohoff	6	6
(Romania) A Cadanțu-Ignatik (Netherlands) I Haverlag	6	5	[5]
2	(Poland) P Kania-Choduń (Czech Republic) R Voráčová	3	7	[10]

Quarterfinals
1	(Venezuela) A Gámiz (Netherlands) E Vedder	7	7
(Brazil) I Gamarra Martins (India) P Thombare	5	5
(Italy) M Paoletti (Italy) L Pigato	5	3
(Romania) A Roșca (Romania) IL Roșca	7	6
(Italy) E Cocciaretto (Serbia) O Danilović	6	6
3	A Gabueva (Brazil) L Pigossi	1	4
A Fomina-Klotz (Germany) J Lohoff	6	6
2	(Poland) P Kania-Choduń (Czech Republic) R Voráčová	2	0

Semifinals
1	(Venezuela) A Gámiz (Netherlands) E Vedder	6	6
(Romania) A Roșca (Romania) IL Roșca	0	3
(Italy) E Cocciaretto (Serbia) O Danilović	6	6
A Fomina-Klotz (Germany) J Lohoff	3	2

Final
1	(Venezuela) A Gámiz (Netherlands) E Vedder	2	3
(Italy) E Cocciaretto (Serbia) O Danilović	6	6
