= 2023 Open delle Puglie – Singles =

Singles
- 2023 Open delle Puglie

Final
- Champion: (Slovenia) Tamara Zidanšek
- Runner-up: (Slovakia) Rebecca Šramková
- Score: 3–6, 7–5, 6–1

Details
- Draw: 32 (4 WC)
- Seeds: 8

Events
Singles	Doubles
← 2022 ·	Open delle Puglie	· 2024 →

Tamara Zidanšek won the title, defeating Rebecca Šramková 3–6, 7–5, 6–1 in the final. Zidanšek saved four match points in the second set.

Julia Grabher was the reigning champion, but did not participate this year.

== Seeds ==
1. (France) Alizé Cornet (semifinals)
2. (Romania) Jaqueline Cristian (quarterfinals)
3. (Spain) Aliona Bolsova (second round)
4. (Italy) Sara Errani (first round)
5. (Slovenia) Tamara Zidanšek (champion)
6. (Brazil) Laura Pigossi (first round)
7. (Spain) Marina Bassols Ribera (first round)
8. (Germany) Noma Noha Akugue (first round)

== Draw ==
=== Key ===
- Q = Qualifier
- WC = Wild card
- LL = Lucky loser
- Alt = Alternate
- SE = Special exempt
- PR = Protected ranking
- ITF = ITF entry
- JE = Junior exempt
- w/o = Walkover
- r = Retired
- d = Defaulted
- SR = Special ranking

=== Finals ===
Semifinals
1	(France) Alizé Cornet	6^{3}	4
5	(Slovenia) Tamara Zidanšek	7^{7}	6
(Croatia) Jana Fett	5	3
(Slovakia) Rebecca Šramková	7	6

Final
5	(Slovenia) Tamara Zidanšek	3	7	6
(Slovakia) Rebecca Šramková	6	5	1

=== Top half ===
First round
1	(France) A Cornet	7	6
(Hungary) RL Jani	5	4
(Greece) V Grammatikopoulou	6	6
WC	(Italy) G Pedone	4	2
WC	(Italy) J Ruggeri	6	6
Q	(United Kingdom) F Christie	3	1
(Turkey) B Cengiz	7	6
8	(Germany) N Noha Akugue	5	0
4	(Italy) S Errani	5	6	4
Q	(Poland) K Kawa	7	4	6
WC	(Italy) V Paganetti	4	1
(France) C Monnet	6	6
(Slovenia) V Erjavec	1	3
(Argentina) ML Carlé	6	6
(Latvia) D Semeņistaja	1	6	2
5	(Slovenia) T Zidanšek	6	2	6

Second round
1	(France) A Cornet	4	6	7
(Greece) V Grammatikopoulou	6	4	5
WC	(Italy) J Ruggeri	6	6
(Turkey) B Cengiz	0	2
Q	(Poland) K Kawa	6	3	6
(France) C Monnet	3	6	2
(Argentina) ML Carlé	6^{4}	2
5	(Slovenia) T Zidanšek	7^{7}	6

Quarterfinals
1	(France) A Cornet	6	6
WC	(Italy) J Ruggeri	2	4
Q	(Poland) K Kawa	2	4
5	(Slovenia) T Zidanšek	6	6

Semifinals
1	(France) A Cornet	6^{3}	4
5	(Slovenia) T Zidanšek	7^{7}	6

=== Bottom half ===
First round
7	(Spain) M Bassols Ribera	3	3
(Croatia) J Fett	6	6
PR	(Romania) PM Țig	2	4
(Cyprus) R Șerban	6	6
(Switzerland) Y In-Albon	4	6^{4}
(Turkey) Z Sönmez	6	7^{7}
(Italy) C Rosatello	6	0	4
3	(Spain) A Bolsova	3	6	6
6	(Brazil) L Pigossi	3	1
(Slovakia) R Šramková	6	6
P Kudermetova	6	7
Q	(Kazakhstan) Z Kulambayeva	1	5
(Slovenia) D Jakupović	0	2
(Italy) N Brancaccio	6	6
Q	(Italy) A Moratelli	5	4
2	(Romania) J Cristian	7	6

Second round
(Croatia) J Fett	6	6
(Cyprus) R Șerban	4	1
(Turkey) Z Sönmez	6	6
3	(Spain) A Bolsova	1	2
(Slovakia) R Šramková	7^{7}	3	6
P Kudermetova	6^{2}	6	3
(Italy) N Brancaccio	3	4
2	(Romania) J Cristian	6	6

Quarterfinals
(Croatia) J Fett	7^{7}	6
(Turkey) Z Sönmez	6^{1}	4
(Slovakia) R Šramková	6	7
2	(Romania) J Cristian	2	5

Semifinals
(Croatia) J Fett	5	3
(Slovakia) R Šramková	7	6

== Qualifying ==
=== Seeds ===
1. (Croatia) Jana Fett (moved to main draw)
2. (Slovenia) Dalila Jakupović (moved to main draw)
3. (Poland) Katarzyna Kawa (qualified)
4. (Czech Republic) Anna Sisková (qualifying competition)

=== Qualifiers ===
1. (United Kingdom) Freya Christie
2. (Italy) Angelica Moratelli
3. (Poland) Katarzyna Kawa
4. (Kazakhstan) Zhibek Kulambayeva

=== Draw ===
==== First qualifier ====
Qualifying competition
Alt	(United Kingdom) Freya Christie	6	7
WC	(Italy) Daria Raimondo	2	5

==== Second qualifier ====
Qualifying competition
Alt	(Italy) Angelica Moratelli	6^{4}	6	6
	(Venezuela) Andrea Gámiz	7^{7}	1	4

==== Third qualifier ====
Qualifying competition
3	(Poland) Katarzyna Kawa	6	6
WC	(Italy) Federica Urgesi	2	4

==== Fourth qualifier ====
Qualifying competition
4	(Czech Republic) Anna Sisková	2	4
	(Kazakhstan) Zhibek Kulambayeva	6	6
