= 2024 Thailand Open 2 – Doubles =

Doubles
- 2024 Thailand Open 2

Final
- Champions: (Kazakhstan) Anna Danilina; Irina Khromacheva
- Runners-up: (Hong Kong) Eudice Chong (Japan) Moyuka Uchijima
- Score: 6–4, 7–5

Events
Singles	Doubles
- Hua Hin Championships

Anna Danilina and Irina Khromacheva defeated Eudice Chong and Moyuka Uchijima in the final, 6–4, 7–5 to win the doubles tennis title at the 2024 Thailand Open 2.

Miyu Kato and Aldila Sutjiadi were the reigning champions, but Sutjiadi chose not to participate and Kato chose to compete in Seoul instead.

== Seeds ==
1. (Kazakhstan) Anna Danilina / Irina Khromacheva (champions)
2. (Hungary) Tímea Babos / (Czech Republic) Anna Sisková (first round)
3. (Italy) Angelica Moratelli / (United States) Sabrina Santamaria (first round)
4. (Hungary) Anna Bondár / (Egypt) Mayar Sherif (withdrew)

== Draw ==
Key

- Q = Qualifier
- WC = Wild card
- LL = Lucky loser
- Alt = Alternate
- ITF = ITF entry
- PR = Protected ranking
- SR = Special ranking
- SE = Special exempt
- JE = Junior exempt
- JR = Junior Accelerator Programme entrant
- CO = College Accelerator Programme entrant
- NG = Next Gen Accelerator Program entrant
- w/o = Walkover
- r = Retired
- d = Defaulted

=== Draw ===
First round
1	(Kazakhstan) A Danilina; I Khromacheva	6	7
WC	(Switzerland) V Golubic (Thailand) L Tararudee	4	5
(France) V Gracheva (Denmark) C Tauson	3	3
(United States) J Aney (Germany) L Papadakis	6	6
3	(Italy) A Moratelli (United States) S Santamaria	1	6	[6]
(United Kingdom) A Barnett (United Kingdom) M Brooks	6	4	[10]
(Croatia) J Fett (Japan) M Hontama	6	6
(United Kingdom) F Christie (Colombia) Y Lizarazo	2	4
(China) S Feng (Thailand) P Plipuech	1	4
(Chinese Taipei) E-s Liang (China) Q Tang	6	6
(Hong Kong) E Chong (Japan) M Uchijima	6	6
Alt	(China) Y Ma (China) S Zheng	2	2
(Belgium) L Salden (Belgium) K Zimmermann	6	7
WC	(Thailand) T Naklo (Thailand) B Thamchaiwat	3	5
(Argentina) N Podoroska (United States) K Volynets	6	7^{7}
2	(Hungary) T Babos (Czech Republic) A Sisková	1	6^{4}

Quarterfinals
1	(Kazakhstan) A Danilina; I Khromacheva	6	6
(United States) J Aney (Germany) L Papadakis	3	2
(United Kingdom) A Barnett (United Kingdom) M Brooks	2
(Croatia) J Fett (Japan) M Hontama	2^{r}
(Chinese Taipei) E-s Liang (China) Q Tang	6	5	[7]
(Hong Kong) E Chong (Japan) M Uchijima	4	7	[10]
(Belgium) L Salden (Belgium) K Zimmermann	w/o
(Argentina) N Podoroska (United States) K Volynets

Semifinals
1	(Kazakhstan) A Danilina; I Khromacheva	6	6
(United Kingdom) A Barnett (United Kingdom) M Brooks	2	3
(Hong Kong) E Chong (Japan) M Uchijima	7	6
(Belgium) L Salden (Belgium) K Zimmermann	5	4

Final
1	(Kazakhstan) A Danilina; I Khromacheva	6	7
(Hong Kong) E Chong (Japan) M Uchijima	4	5
