= Rebecca Šramková =

Slovak tennis player (born 1996)

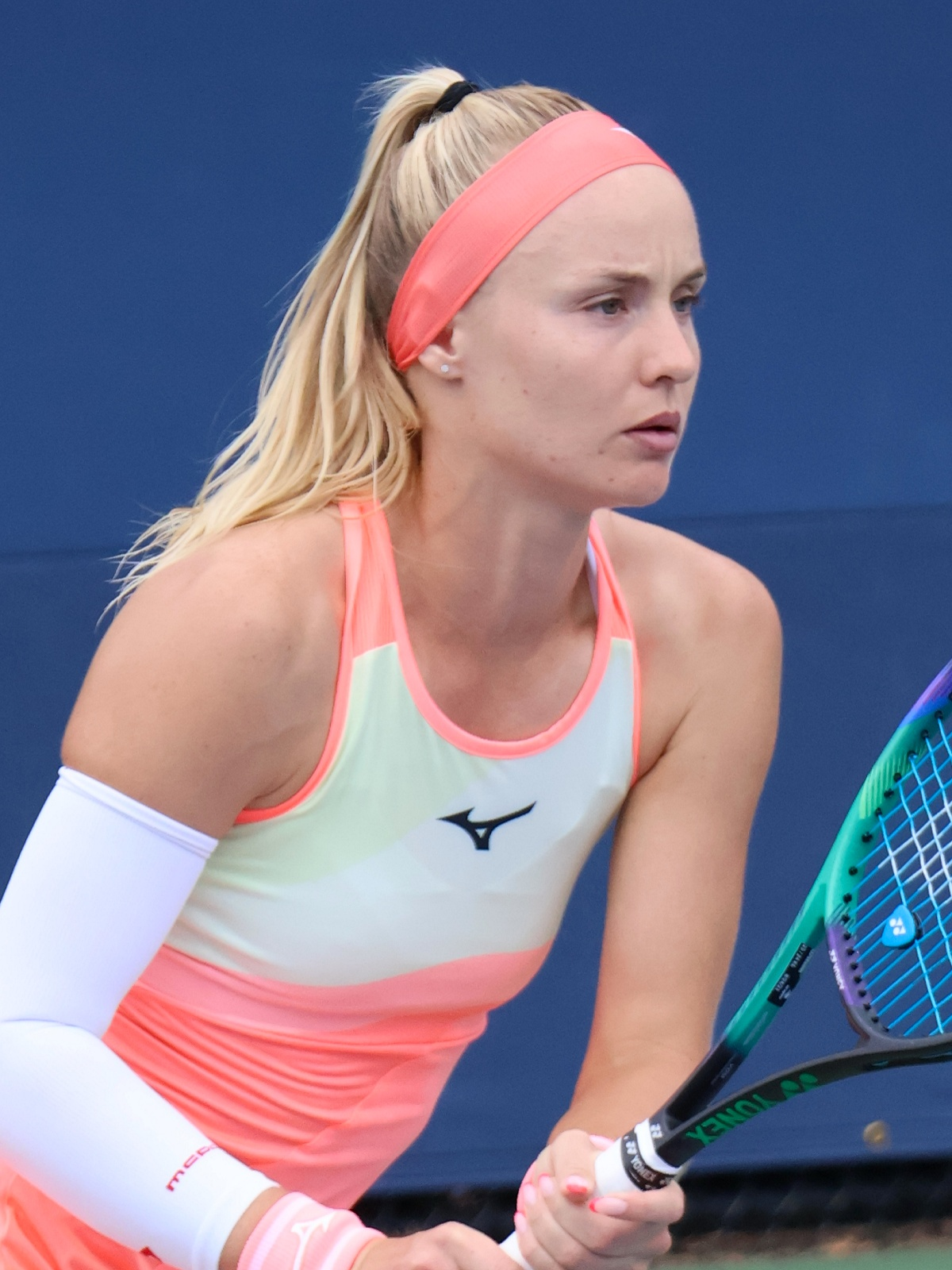
- Šramková at the 2023 US Open
- Country (sports): Slovakia
- Residence: Bratislava, Slovakia
- Born: 19 October 1996 (age 29) Bratislava
- Height: 1.79 m (5 ft 10 in)
- Turned pro: 2013
- Plays: Right (two-handed backhand)
- Coach: Milan Martinec
- Prize money: $2,648,170

Singles
- Career record: 430–295
- Career titles: 1
- Highest ranking: No. 33 (14 July 2025)
- Current ranking: No. 151 (24 August 2026)

Grand Slam singles results
- Australian Open: 2R (2025)
- French Open: 1R (2022, 2024, 2025, 2026)
- Wimbledon: 1R (2024, 2025)
- US Open: 1R (2025, 2026)

Doubles
- Career record: 56–56
- Career titles: 4 ITF
- Highest ranking: No. 94 (12 January 2026)
- Current ranking: No. 172 (24 August 2026)

Grand Slam doubles results
- Australian Open: 2R (2025)
- French Open: 3R (2025)
- Wimbledon: 3R (2026)
- US Open: 1R (2025)

Team competitions
- Fed Cup: F (2024), record 10–11
- Last updated on: 28 August 2026.

Rebecca Šramková (Slovak pronunciation: [ˈrebeka ˈʂramkɔʋaː]; born 19 October 1996) is a Slovak professional tennis player. She has a career-high singles ranking of world No. 33, achieved on 14 July 2025, and a best doubles ranking of No. 94, reached on 12 January 2026. She has won one WTA Tour singles title in Hua Hin, Thailand, and one WTA 125 singles title. On the ITF Women's Circuit, she has won 13 singles titles and four doubles titles.

At the 2024 Billie Jean King Cup, playing for the Slovak team, she contributed to her country reaching the final for the first time since 2002.

== Career ==
=== Juniors ===
On the ITF Junior Circuit, Šramková achieved her highest ranking of 200 on 14 July 2014. She won one title in doubles and none in singles.

=== 2012–2014: Professional debut ===
Her debut in the main competitions of the ITF Circuit was in May 2012, when she advanced from qualifying at the $10k tournament in Velenje, Slovenia. In the second round, she lost to Slovenian Anja Prislan. She won the premier single at this level of tennis in Vrnjačka Banja, Serbia. At the $10k event which took place in September 2013, she defeated Dunja Stamenković from Serbia in the final.

=== 2015–2016: First WTA Tour qualifying, ITF Circuit title ===
She made her WTA Tour singles qualifying debut 2015 on the grass courts of the Nottingham Open. At the beginning of the qualifying competition, she was eliminated by the second seeded Zhu Lin.

Šramková won her biggest singles title to date at the 2016 Open de Biarritz, a $100k tournament, where she defeated Martina Trevisan in the final in three sets. This was her fifth title on the ITF Circuit.

=== 2017–2022: Major and WTA Tour debuts ===
She made her Grand Slam tournament main-draw debut at the 2017 Australian Open by mastering the three qualifying rounds, where she dealt with Virginie Razzano in the decisive match. However, in the opening round of the singles tournament, she lost to Chinese player Duan Yingying.

She made her WTA Tour debut at the Ladies Championship Gstaad where she defeated Nina Stojanović in the first round.

At the 2021 Prague Open, she defeated top seed and world No. 12, Petra Kvitová, for the biggest win of her career.

At the 2022 French Open, on her debut at this major, she entered the main draw as a lucky loser after the withdrawal of Rebecca Peterson.

=== 2023–2024: Maiden career title, WTA 1000 & top 50 debuts, BJK Cup finalist ===
At the 2023 Warsaw Open, she qualified for the main draw and defeated second seed and world No. 18, Karolína Muchová, to reach her first WTA Tour quarterfinal, from 5-1 down in the third set, saving four match points.

In September 2023, Šramková reached her first WTA 125 final in Bari where she lost to Tamara Zidanšek, despite having four match points in the second set.

She made her WTA 1000 debut at the 2024 Indian Wells Open, after qualifying for the main draw, and won her first match at this level over Wang Yafan. Ranked No. 120, she also qualified for the main draw at the Italian Open and defeated wildcard Georgia Pedone, 26th seed Katie Boulter and Sofia Kenin to reach the fourth round, before losing to Jeļena Ostapenko. As a result, she reached the top 100 in the WTA rankings for the first time in her career on 20 May 2024.

She also qualified for the French Open but lost to Amanda Anisimova. and made her debut at Wimbledon. At the Budapest Grand Prix, she reached her second Tour quarterfinal, upsetting third seed Wang Xiyu, before losing to Eva Lys.

In September 2024, ranked No. 136, Šramková reached her first WTA 250 final at the Jasmin Open, after defeating qualifier Elsa Jacquemot, second seed Clara Burel in straight sets, Sara Sorribes Tormo saving a match point to reach her first WTA Tour semifinal, and seventh seed Lucia Bronzetti. In the final, she lost in straight sets to Sonay Kartal. Ranked No. 89, she reached back-to-back finals in a month at the Thailand Open, defeating local qualifier and WTA Tour debutante Mananchaya Sawangkaew, Magda Linette, Jana Fett, and Tamara Zidanšek. Šramková defeated Laura Siegemund in the final to claim her maiden Tour-level title and became the tenth first-time WTA Tour champion in the season. She moved to a new career-high at No. 61 on 23 September 2024, raising more than 40 positions up in the singles rankings and became the Slovak number-one-player ahead of Anna Karolína Schmiedlová. On her debut at the China Open, where she qualified for the main draw, she defeated Anhelina Kalinina and upset 22nd seed Ekaterina Alexandrova to reach the third round at a WTA 1000 for the second time, recording her ninth straight match and fourth top 50 win for the season and the biggest win by ranking. At the Jiangxi Open, Šramková reached a third final since the US Open with wins over Wei Sijia, avenging her first-round loss in Guangzhou, and Laura Siegemund. She lost the final to Viktorija Golubic in straight sets.

=== 2025: Nottingham semifinal ===
Šramková defeated Katie Volynets to reach the second round at the Australian Open for the first time, where she lost to second seed Iga Świątek.

In February at the Qatar Ladies Open, she recorded wins over Anhelina Kalinina, and 12th seed Mirra Andreeva to make it into the third round, at which point her run was ended by fifth seed Elena Rybakina. Later that month, Šramková reached the quarterfinals at the Mérida Open by overcoming Lulu Sun and third seed Beatriz Haddad Maia, before losing in the last eight to qualifier Emiliana Arango, in three sets.

At the Italian Open, she defeated McCartney Kessler, but was eliminated in the second round by 17th seed Jeļena Ostapenko.

Moving onto the grass-court season in June at the Nottingham Open, Šramková overcame qualifier Laura Siegemund, fourth seed Yulia Putintseva and seventh seed Linda Nosková to reach the semifinals, in which she lost to McCartney Kessler. At Wimbledon, she lost to 21st seed Beatriz Haddad Maia in the first round.

The second half of the season saw Šramková make it through to two WTA Tour quarterfinals, in August at the Monterrey Open where she lost to Alycia Parks and in October at the Japan Women's Open where her run was ended by the eventual champion, Leylah Fernandez.

== National representation ==
In 2017, Šramková made her debut on the Slovak Fed Cup team in Forlì, being part of a match against hosting Italian team, at World Group II, in which she won both singles against Sara Errani and Francesca Schiavone as a player outside the top 100. With the decision set, they experienced a setback alongside Anna Karolína Schmiedlová during the opening set of doubles. The Slovak team won 3–2.

In November 2024, Šramková defeated world No. 11, Danielle Collins, as Slovakia overcame the US team to qualify for the BJK Cup quarterfinals. She then defeated Ajla Tomljanović as Slovakia overcame Australia to reach the semifinals. In the last four, Šramková came back from a set down to defeat Katie Boulter to help Slovakia into the final for the first time since 2002. She lost to Jasmine Paolini in the final as Slovakia were defeated by Italy.

== Performance timelines ==
Key
W	F	SF	QF	#R	RR	Q#	DNQ	A	NH

(W) winner; (F) finalist; (SF) semifinalist; (QF) quarterfinalist; (#R) rounds 4, 3, 2, 1; (RR) round-robin stage; (Q#) qualification round; (DNQ) did not qualify; (A) absent; (NH) not held; (SR) strike rate (events won / competed); (W–L) win–loss record.
To avoid confusion and double counting, these charts are updated at the conclusion of a tournament or when the player's participation has ended.

Only main-draw results in WTA Tour, Grand Slam tournaments, Fed Cup/Billie Jean King Cup and Olympic Games are included in win–loss records.

=== Singles ===
Current through the 2026 Cincinnati Open.

Tournament	2016	2017	2018	2019	2020	2021	2022	2023	2024	2025	2026	SR	W–L	Win%
Grand Slam tournaments
Australian Open	A	1R	A	A	Q1	Q3	Q2	A	Q1	2R	1R	0 / 3	1–3	25%
French Open	A	Q2	Q3	Q2	Q2	Q3	1R	A	1R	1R	1R	0 / 4	0–4	0%
Wimbledon	A	Q2	A	Q1	NH	Q2	Q2	Q2	1R	1R	A	0 / 2	0–2	0%
US Open	Q1	A	Q1	Q2	A	Q2	A	Q2	Q2	1R	1R	0 / 2	0–2	0%
Win–loss	0–0	0–1	0–0	0–0	0–0	0–0	0–1	0–0	0–2	1–4	0–3	0 / 11	1–11	8%
National representation
Billie Jean King Cup	A	PO	A	G2	QR	A	A	A	F	QR		0 / 1	3–5	40%
WTA 1000 tournaments
Qatar Open (Note: The first Premier 5 event of the year has switched back and forth between the Dubai Tennis Championships and the Qatar Ladies Open since 2009. Dubai was classified as a Premier 5 event from 2009–2011 before being succeeded by Doha for the 2012–2014 period. In 2015, Dubai regained its Premier 5 status while Doha was demoted to Premier status. The Premier 5 tournaments were reclassified as WTA 1000 tournaments in 2021.)	A	NMS	A	NMS	A	NMS	A	NMS	A	3R	Q1	0 / 1	2–1	67%
Dubai Championships	NMS	A	NMS	A	NMS	A	NMS	A	A	1R	1R	0 / 2	0–2	0%
Indian Wells Open	A	Q1	A	A	NH	A	A	A	2R	1R	1R	0 / 3	1–3	25%
Miami Open	A	Q1	A	A	NH	A	A	A	Q2	2R	Q2	0 / 1	1–1	50%
Madrid Open	A	A	A	A	NH	A	A	A	Q2	1R	Q1	0 / 1	0–1	0%
Italian Open	A	A	A	A	A	A	A	A	4R	2R	Q1	0 / 2	4–2	67%
Canada Open	A	A	A	A	A	A	A	A	A	2R	2R	0 / 2	1–2	33%
Cincinnati Open	A	A	A	A	A	A	A	A	A	2R	Q2	0 / 1	1–1	50%
China Open	A	A	A	A	NH			A	3R	1R		0 / 2	2–2	50%
Wuhan Open	A	A	A	A	NH				A	2R		0 / 1	1–1	50%
Win–Loss	0–0	0–0	0–0	0–0	0–0	0–0	0–0	0–0	6–3	6–10	1–3	0 / 16	13–16	45%
Career statistics
Tournaments	0	2	1	0	0	1	1	2	11	27	8	41		
Overall win–loss	0–0	3–3	0–1	0–2	0–0	1–2	0–1	2–2	24–10	22–27	3–8	55–56		50%
Year-end ranking	119	324	233	171	203	167	316	129	43	74		$2,358,123		

== WTA Tour finals ==
=== Singles: 3 (1 title, 2 runner-ups) ===
Legend WTA 250 (1–2)	Finals by surface Hard (1–2)

Result	W–L	Date	Tournament	Tier	Surface	Opponent	Score
Loss	0–1	Sep 2024	Jasmin Open, Tunisia	WTA 250	Hard	(United Kingdom) Sonay Kartal	3–6, 5–7
Win	1–1	Sep 2024	Hua Hin Championships, Thailand	WTA 250	Hard	(Germany) Laura Siegemund	6–4, 6–4
Loss	1–2	Nov 2024	Jiangxi Open, China	WTA 250	Hard	(Switzerland) Viktorija Golubic	3–6, 5–7

== WTA 125 finals ==
=== Singles: 2 (1 title, 1 runner-up) ===
Result	W–L	Date	Tournament	Surface	Opponent	Score
Loss	0–1	Sep 2023	Bari Open, Italy	Clay	(Slovenia) Tamara Zidanšek	6–3, 5–7, 1–6
Win	1–1	Oct 2026	Suzhou Open, China	Hard	(Japan) Kyōka Okamura	6–3, 6–1

== ITF Circuit finals ==
=== Singles: 19 (13 titles, 6 runner-ups) ===
Legend W100 tournaments (1–0) W50/60 tournaments (2–2) W40/W50 tournaments (2–1) W25 tournaments (4–3) W10/15 tournaments (4–0)	Finals by surface Hard (5–1) Clay (8–3) Grass (0–1) Carpet (0–1)

Result	W–L	Date	Tournament	Tier	Surface	Opponent	Score
Win	1–0	Sep 2013	ITF Vrnjačka Banja, Serbia	10k	Clay	(Serbia) Dunja Stamenković	6–3, 6–2
Win	2–0	Aug 2014	ITF Leipzig, Germany	15k	Hard	(Slovakia) Petra Uberalová	6–4, 3–6, 6–2
Loss	2–1	Feb 2015	ITF Kreuzlingen, Switzerland	50k	Carpet (i)	(Belarus) Olga Govortsova	2–6, 1–6
Win	3–1	Apr 2016	ITF Qarshi, Usbekistan	25k	Hard	(Serbia) Nina Stojanović	6–1, 6–3
Loss	3–2	Jun 2016	Ilkley Trophy, United Kingdom	50k	Grass	(Russia) Evgeniya Rodina	4–6, 4–6
Win	4–2	Jun 2016	ITF Rome, Italy	25k	Clay	(Hungary) Réka Luca Jani	6–1, 6–1
Win	5–2	Sep 2016	Open de Biarritz, France	100k	Clay	(Italy) Martina Trevisan	6–3, 4–6, 6–1
Win	6–2	Mar 2018	ITF Antalya, Turkey	15k	Clay	(Russia) Amina Anshba	6–1, 7–6^{(3)}
Win	7–2	Mar 2018	ITF Antalya, Turkey	15k	Clay	(Sweden) Cornelia Lister	6–1, 7–5
Loss	7–3	Jun 2018	Macha Lake Open, Czech Republic	25k	Clay	(Czech Republic) Monika Kilnarová	6–7^{(5)}, 3-6
Loss	7–4	Jul 2018	Bella Cup Torún, Poland	25k	Clay	(Czech Republic) Barbora Krejčíková	5–7, 1–6
Win	8–4	Jan 2019	Open Andrézieux-Bouthéon, France	W60	Hard (i)	(France) Audrey Albié	6–2, 6–7^{(4)}, 6–2
Win	9–4	Jun 2019	Grado Tennis Cup, Italy	W25	Clay	(Romania) Jaqueline Cristian	7–6^{(3)}, 3–1 ret.
Win	10–4	Jun 2019	Bella Cup Torún, Poland	W60	Clay	(Ukraine) Marta Kostyuk	6–1, 6–2
Loss	10–5	Feb 2020	Rancho Santa Fe Open, United States	W25	Hard	(China) You Xiaodi	4–6, 6–7^{(5)}
Win	11–5	Feb 2023	GB Pro-Series Bath, UK	W25	Hard (i)	(Czech Republic) Tereza Smitková	6–2, 6–2
Win	12–5	May 2023	ITF Otočec, Slovenia	W40	Clay	(Australia) Seone Mendez	6–3, 7–6^{(2)}
Loss	12–6	Jun 2023	ITF Otočec, Slovenia	W40	Clay	(Greece) Valentini Grammatikopoulou	4–6, 4–6
Win	13–6	Jan 2024	Porto Indoor, Portugal	W50	Hard (i)	(Spain) Jéssica Bouzas Maneiro	6–7^{(4)}, 7–5, 6–1

=== Doubles: 6 (4 titles, 2 runner-ups) ===
Legend $60,000 tournaments (2–0) $25,000 tournaments (0–1) $10,000 tournaments (2–1)	Finals by surface Hard (1–0) Clay (3–2)

Result	W–L	Date	Tournament	Tier	Surface	Partner	Opponents	Score
Win	1–0	Aug 2013	ITF Vienna, Austria	10k	Clay	(Slovakia) Michaela Pochabová	(Japan) Hiroko Kuwata (Japan) Hirono Watanabe	7–5, 6–2
Loss	1–1	Sep 2013	ITF Vrnjačka Banja, Serbia	10k	Clay	(Slovakia) Natália Vajdová	(North Macedonia) Lina Gjorcheska (Russia) Polina Leykina	4–6, 3–6
Loss	1–2	Sep 2014	Sofia Cup, Bulgaria	25k	Clay	(Bulgaria) Julia Terziyska	(North Macedonia) Lina Gjorcheska (Greece) Despina Papamichail	1–6, 4–6
Win	2–2	Sep 2015	ITF Sankt Pölten, Austria	10k	Clay	(Austria) Pia König	(Germany) Nora Niedmers (United States) Tina Tehrani	6–2, 6–2
Win	3–2	Jun 2019	Bella Cup Torún, Poland	W60	Clay	(Spain) Rebeka Masarova	(United States) Robin Anderson (Ukraine) Anhelina Kalinina	6–4, 3–6, [10–4]
Win	4–2	Oct 2022	Trnava Indoor, Slovakia	W60	Hard (i)	(Russia) Sofya Lansere	(Chinese Taipei) Lee Pei-chi (Chinese Taipei) Wu Fang-hsien	4–6, 6–2, [11–9]
