= 2024 Open delle Puglie – Doubles =

Doubles
- 2024 Open delle Puglie

Final
- Champions: (Kazakhstan) Anna Danilina; Irina Khromacheva
- Runners-up: (Italy) Angelica Moratelli (Mexico) Renata Zarazúa
- Score: 6–1, 6–3

Events
Singles	Doubles
← 2023 ·	Open delle Puglie	· 2025 →

Anna Danilina and Irina Khromacheva won the doubles title at the 2024 Open delle Puglie, defeating Angelica Moratelli and Renata Zarazúa in the final, 6–1, 6–3.

Katarzyna Kawa and Anna Sisková were the reigning champions, but did not participate this year.

== Seeds ==
1. (Kazakhstan) Anna Danilina / Irina Khromacheva (champions)
2. (United States) Quinn Gleason / (China) Tang Qianhui (semifinals)

== Draw ==
=== Key ===
- Q = Qualifier
- WC = Wild card
- LL = Lucky loser
- Alt = Alternate
- SE = Special exempt
- PR = Protected ranking
- ITF = ITF entry
- JE = Junior exempt
- w/o = Walkover
- r = Retired
- d = Defaulted
- SR = Special ranking

=== Draw ===
Quarterfinals
1	(Kazakhstan) A Danilina; I Khromacheva	6	6
(France) E Cascino (Georgia (country)) N Dzalamidze	0	1
(Romania) I Bara (Argentina) N Podoroska	5	3
(Portugal) F Jorge (Kazakhstan) Z Kulambayeva	7	6
(Italy) A Moratelli (Mexico) R Zarazúa	7	7
(Italy) L Bronzetti (Italy) C Rosatello	5	5
WC	(Italy) E Alvisi (Italy) B Ricci	1	5
2	(United States) Q Gleason (China) Q Tang	6	7

Semifinals
1	(Kazakhstan) A Danilina; I Khromacheva	6	6
(Portugal) F Jorge (Kazakhstan) Z Kulambayeva	2	2
(Italy) A Moratelli (Mexico) R Zarazúa	6	6
2	(United States) Q Gleason (China) Q Tang	1	3

Final
1	(Kazakhstan) A Danilina; I Khromacheva	6	6
(Italy) A Moratelli (Mexico) R Zarazúa	1	3
