= 2023 Open delle Puglie – Doubles =

Doubles
- 2023 Open delle Puglie

Final
- Champions: (Poland) Katarzyna Kawa (Czech Republic) Anna Sisková
- Runners-up: (Greece) Valentini Grammatikopoulou (France) Elixane Lechemia
- Score: 6–1, 6–2

Events
Singles	Doubles
← 2022 ·	Open delle Puglie	· 2024 →

Elisabetta Cocciaretto and Olga Danilović were the reigning champions, but chose not to participate this year.

Katarzyna Kawa and Anna Sisková won the title, defeating Valentini Grammatikopoulou and Elixane Lechemia 6–1, 6–2 in the final.

== Seeds ==
1. (Spain) Aliona Bolsova / (Venezuela) Andrea Gámiz (first round)
2. (Slovenia) Dalila Jakupović / Irina Khromacheva (quarterfinals)
3. (Italy) Angelica Moratelli / (Italy) Camilla Rosatello (first round)
4. (Poland) Katarzyna Kawa / (Czech Republic) Anna Sisková (champions)

== Draw ==
=== Key ===
- Q = Qualifier
- WC = Wild card
- LL = Lucky loser
- Alt = Alternate
- SE = Special exempt
- PR = Protected ranking
- ITF = ITF entry
- JE = Junior exempt
- w/o = Walkover
- r = Retired
- d = Defaulted
- SR = Special ranking

=== Draw ===
First round
1	(Spain) A Bolsova (Venezuela) A Gámiz	3	6	[5]
(Romania) J Cristian (Germany) V Heisen	6	3	[10]
(Italy) N Brancaccio (Argentina) ML Carlé	6^{5}	6	[10]
A Fomina-Klotz (Germany) J Lohoff	7^{7}	2	[8]
4	(Poland) K Kawa (Czech Republic) A Sisková	6	6
(Colombia) Y Lizarazo (Colombia) MP Pérez García	1	1
(Czech Republic) K Kubáňová (Australia) A Osborne	4	6	[10]
(United Kingdom) F Christie (United Kingdom) A Collins	6	3	[5]
WC	(Italy) G Pedone (Italy) J Ruggeri	2	7^{10}	[2]
(Kazakhstan) Z Kulambayeva (France) C Monnet	6	6^{8}	[10]
(Spain) M Bassols Ribera (Brazil) L Pigossi	6	2	[10]
3	(Italy) A Moratelli (Italy) C Rosatello	2	6	[3]
(Greece) V Grammatikopoulou (France) E Lechemia	6	6
(Turkey) B Cengiz (Latvia) D Semeņistaja	3	2
(Croatia) M Dražić (Bosnia and Herzegovina) A Wagner	2	2
2	(Slovenia) D Jakupović; I Khromacheva	6	6

Quarterfinals
(Romania) J Cristian (Germany) V Heisen	6	6
(Italy) N Brancaccio (Argentina) ML Carlé	2	3
4	(Poland) K Kawa (Czech Republic) A Sisková	6	3	[11]
(Czech Republic) K Kubáňová (Australia) A Osborne	4	6	[9]
(Kazakhstan) Z Kulambayeva (France) C Monnet	7^{7}	6
(Spain) M Bassols Ribera (Brazil) L Pigossi	6^{2}	0
(Greece) V Grammatikopoulou (France) E Lechemia	6	6
2	(Slovenia) D Jakupović; I Khromacheva	1	4

Semifinals
(Romania) J Cristian (Germany) V Heisen	6^{3}	2
4	(Poland) K Kawa (Czech Republic) A Sisková	7^{7}	6
(Kazakhstan) Z Kulambayeva (France) C Monnet	1	1
(Greece) V Grammatikopoulou (France) E Lechemia	6	6

Final
4	(Poland) K Kawa (Czech Republic) A Sisková	6	6
(Greece) V Grammatikopoulou (France) E Lechemia	1	2
