= Ksenia Laskutova =

Russian tennis player (born 1996)

- Full name: Ksenia Sergeyevna Laskutova
- Country (sports): Russia
- Born: 29 August 1996 (age 30) Moscow, Russia
- Plays: Right-handed
- College: University of Tulsa (2014–2018)
- Prize money: $107,273

Singles
- Career record: 257–180
- Career titles: 4 ITF
- Highest ranking: No. 330 (7 October 2024)
- Current ranking: No. 832 (29 June 2026)

Doubles
- Career record: 215–113
- Career titles: 24 ITF
- Highest ranking: No. 266 (11 November 2019)
- Current ranking: No. 713 (29 June 2026)
- Last updated on: 7 July 2026.

Ksenia Sergeyevna Laskutova (Russian: Ксения Сергеевна Ласкутова, born 29 August 1996) is a Russian tennis player. Laskutova has a career-high WTA singles ranking of 330, achieved in October 2024. She also has a career-high WTA doubles ranking of 266, achieved in November 2019.

Laskutova played college tennis from 2014 to 2018. She played on the University of Tulsa's Tulsa Golden Hurricane's women's tennis team.

== Career ==
In 2016, she played her first doubles final in Egypt. In December, she won her first doubles title in Rabat, Morocco.

In 2019, she played the doubles final with her Australian partner Bozicevic in the W25 tournament held in Fergana, Uzbekistan. In August, she reached a final with her compatriot Melnikova in Germany, where they were defeated by the Spanish duo Sara Sorribes Tormo and Georgina García Pérez.

In 2022, she won the doubles title in Gwalior, India with her partner Vaidehi Chaudhari. In singles, Laskutova was defeated in the final by her partner Chaudhari.

In 2023, she became champion in doubles with her Colombian partner María Herazo González in the W25 tournament in Santo Domingo, Dominican Republic.

In 2024, she lost to French Alice Tubello in the singles final of the W35 tournament in Bujumbura, Burundi. In July, she lost to South African Zoë Kruger in the singles final of the W35 tournament held in Hillcrest, South Africa but became champion in doubles with her Italian partner Verena Meliss.

Laskutova made her WTA Tour main-draw debut at the 2024 Thailand Open in Hua Hin, where she received entry into the singles tournament as a qualifier, losing in the first round to Nadia Podoroska.

== ITF Circuit finals ==
=== Singles: 11 (4 titles, 7 runner-ups) ===
Legend W35 tournaments W15 tournaments	Finals by surface Hard (1–3) Clay (3–4)

Result	W–L	Date	Tournament	Tier	Surface	Opponent	Score
Loss	0–1	Dec 2021	ITF Antalya, Turkey	W15	Clay	(Romania) Arina Vasilescu	0–6, 2–6
Win	1–1	May 2022	ITF Antalya, Turkey	W15	Clay	(Portugal) Inês Murta	6–3, 2–6, 6–4
Win	2–1	Nov 2022	ITF Antalya, Turkey	W15	Clay	(France) Emma Léné	4–6, 6–1, 6–1
Loss	2–2	Dec 2022	ITF Gwalior, India	W15	Hard	(India) Vaidehi Chaudhari	5–7, 4–6
Loss	2–3	Mar 2024	ITF Karaganda, Kazakhstan	W15	Hard	(France) Yaroslava Bartashevich	4–6, 3–6
Win	3–3	Mar 2024	ITF Karaganda, Kazakhstan	W15	Hard	(South Korea) Lee Eun-hye	6–4, 3–6, 6–3
Loss	3–4	Mar 2024	ITF Antalya, Turkey	W15	Clay	(Italy) Beatrice Ricci	4–6, 3–6
Loss	3–5	Apr 2024	ITF Bujumbura, Burundi	W35	Clay	(France) Alice Tubello	2–6, 7–6^{(5)}, 3–6
Win	4–5	Apr 2024	ITF Shymkent, Kazakhstan	W15	Clay	(Russia) Valeriya Yushchenko	6–0, 6–2
Loss	4–6	Apr 2024	ITF Shymkent, Kazakhstan	W15	Clay	(Russia) Valeriya Yushchenko	3–6, 6–2, 0–6
Loss	4–7	Apr 2024	ITF Hillcrest, South Africa	W35	Hard	(South Africa) Zoë Kruger	2–6, 3–6

=== Doubles: 43 (24 titles, 19 runner-ups) ===
Legend
W25/35 tournaments
W10/15 tournaments

Result	W–L	Date	Tournament	Tier	Surface	Partner	Opponents	Score
Loss	0–1	Aug 2016	ITF Sharm El Sheikh, Egypt	W10	Hard	(Ukraine) Kateryna Sliusar	(Malaysia) Jawairiah Noordin (Malaysia) Theiviya Selvarajoo	5–7, 6–4, [10–12]
Win	1–1	Dec 2016	ITF Rabat, Morocco	W10	Clay	(France) Victoria Muntean	(Italy) Jessica Bertoldo (Italy) Sara Marcionni	6–1, 6–1
Loss	1–2	Nov 2018	ITF Lawrence, United States	W25	Hard (i)	(Kazakhstan) Anna Danilina	(Montenegro) Vladica Babić (United States) Ena Shibahara	4–6, 2–6
Loss	1–3	Jun 2019	Fergana Challenger, Uzbekistan	W25	Hard	(Australia) Isabella Bozicevic	(Uzbekistan) Nigina Abduraimova (Turkey) Berfu Cengiz	6–4, 1–6, [3–10]
Loss	1–4	Aug 2019	ITF Bad Saulgau, Germany	W25	Clay	(Russia) Marina Melnikova	(Spain) Georgina García Pérez (Spain) Sara Sorribes Tormo	3–6, 1–6
Win	2–4	Oct 2019	ITF Nanning, China	W25	Hard	(Cyprus) Raluca Șerban	(China) Cao Siqi (China) Wang Danni	6–2, 6–4
Loss	2–5	Jan 2020	ITF Antalya, Turkey	W15	Clay	(Russia) Anna Ureke	(Kazakhstan) Zhibek Kulambayeva (China) Ma Yexin	4–6, 2–6
Win	3–5	Oct 2020	ITF Sharm El Sheikh	W15	Hard	(Russia) Daria Mishina	(Russia) Anastasia Gasanova (Ukraine) Valeriya Strakhova	5–7, 7–6^{(6)}, [10–4]
Win	4–5	Nov 2020	ITF Sharm El Sheikh	W15	Hard	(Russia) Daria Mishina	(Switzerland) Valentina Ryser (Switzerland) Lulu Sun	7–6^{(3)}, 7–6^{(2)}, [12–10]
Win	5–5	Nov 2021	ITF Antalya, Turkey	W15	Clay	(Russia) Aleksandra Pospelova	(South Korea) Back Da-yeon (China) Tian Fangran	2–6, 6–2, [10–6]
Win	6–5	Dec 2021	ITF Antalya, Turkey	W15	Clay	(Hungary) Amarissa Tóth	(Spain) Claudia Hoste Ferrer (Spain) Carlota Martínez Círez	6–0, 7–5
Win	7–5	Dec 2021	ITF Antalya, Turkey	W15	Clay	(Hungary) Amarissa Tóth	(Croatia) Mariana Dražić (Argentina) Jazmín Ortenzi	6–4, 6–2
Loss	7–6	Dec 2021	ITF Antalya, Turkey	W15	Clay	(Hungary) Amarissa Tóth	(Romania) Oana Gavrilă (Romania) Arina Vasilescu	6–1, 4–6, [10–12]
Win	8–6	Dec 2021	ITF Monastir, Tunisia	W15	Hard	(Hong Kong) Maggie Ng	(Lithuania) Andrė Lukošiūtė (United Kingdom) Eliz Maloney	7–5, 6–3
Win	9–6	Dec 2021	ITF Monastir, Tunisia	W15	Hard	(France) Yaroslava Bartashevich	(Japan) Haruna Arakawa (France) Victoria Muntean	6–2, 6–1
Loss	9–7	Jan 2022	ITF Monastir, Tunisia	W25	Hard	(Sweden) Fanny Östlund	(Hong Kong) Eudice Chong (Hong Kong) Cody Wong	
Win	10–7	Mar 2022	ITF Antalya, Turkey	W15	Clay	(Hungary) Amarissa Tóth	(Greece) Sapfo Sakellaridi (Russia) Anastasia Zolotareva	7–6^{(4)}, 1–6, [10–7]
Loss	10–8	Apr 2022	ITF Antalya, Turkey	W15	Clay	(Greece) Sapfo Sakellaridi	(Russia) Vlada Koval (Bulgaria) Gergana Topalova	6–7^{(9)}, 2–6
Loss	10–9	Apr 2022	ITF Antalya, Turkey	W15	Clay	(Bulgaria) Gergana Topalova	(Sweden) Vanessa Ersöz (Turkey) Doğa Türkmen	6–7^{(2)}, 6–3, [5–10]
Win	11–9	May 2022	ITF Antalya, Turkey	W15	Clay	(Japan) Misaki Matsuda	(Japan) Rina Saigo (Japan) Yukina Saigo	7–5, 6–4
Loss	11–10	Apr 2022	ITF Antalya, Turkey	W15	Clay	(Russia) Anna Ureke	(Japan) Mayuka Aikawa (Serbia) Tamara Čurović	3–6, 5–7
Loss	11–11	Dec 2022	ITF Antalya, Turkey	W15	Clay	(Russia) Aleksandra Pospelova	(Chinese Taipei) Li Yu-yun (Russia) Anna Zyryanova	6–3, 4–6, [7–10]
Win	12–11	Dec 2022	ITF Oberpullendorf, Austria	W15	Hard (i)	(Canada) Mia Kupres	(Austria) Arabella Koller (Austria) Mavie Österreicher	7–5, 7–5
Win	13–11	Dec 2022	ITF Gwalior, India	W15	Hard (i)	(India) Vaidehi Chaudhari	(India) Vaishnavi Adkar (India) Saumya Vig	7–5, 7–5
Win	14–11	Apr 2023	ITF Bujumbura, Burundi	W25	Clay	(Sweden) Fanny Östlund	(Netherlands) Jasmijn Gimbrère (Germany) Jasmin Jebawy	6–4, 6–3
Loss	14–12	Apr 2023	ITF Bujumbura, Burundi	W25	Clay	(Sweden) Fanny Östlund	(Netherlands) Jasmijn Gimbrère (Germany) Jasmin Jebawy	3–6, 4–6
Win	15–12	Apr 2023	ITF Kursumlijska Banja, Serbia	W15	Clay	(Slovakia) Katarína Kužmová	(Switzerland) Leonie Küng (Serbia) Bojana Marinković	7–5, 6–3
Win	16–12	Jun 2023	ITF Santo Domingo, Dominican Republic	W25	Clay	(Colombia) María Herazo González	(Mexico) Ana Sofía Sánchez (Ukraine) Yuliia Starodubtseva	2–6, 6–4, [11–9]
Win	17–12	Jul 2023	ITF Santo Domingo, Dominican Republic	W25	Clay	(Switzerland) Leonie Küng	(Spain) Noelia Bouzo Zanotti (Argentina) Martina Capurro Taborda	6–4, 3–6, [10–3]
Loss	17–13	Mar 2024	ITF Karaganda, Kazakhstan	W15	Hard	(Kyrgyzstan) Vladislava Andreevskaya	(Russia) Victoria Mikhaylova (Ukraine) Anastasiia Poplavska	2–6, 6–3, [5–10]
Win	18–13	Mar 2024	ITF Antalya, Turkey	W15	Clay	(Russia) Anastasiia Grechkina	(Russia) Ekaterina Ovcharenko (Switzerland) Katerina Tsygourova	6–3, 6–1
Win	19–13	May 2024	ITF Kuršumlijska Banja, Serbia	W35	Clay	(Slovakia) Radka Zelníčková	(Czech Republic) Michaela Bayerlová (Bulgaria) Lia Karatancheva	5–7, 7–6^{(3)}, [11–9]
Win	20–13	Jun 2024	ITF Kursumlijska Banja	W15	Clay	(Russia) Alexandra Shubladze	(Australia) Kaylah McPhee (Poland) Zuzanna Pawlikowska	6–4, 7–5
Loss	20–14	Jun 2024	ITF Kursumlijska Banja	W15	Clay	(Russia) Alexandra Shubladze	(Serbia) Natalija Senic (Serbia) Anja Stankovic	6–7^{(5)}, 6–7^{(4)}
Win	21–14	Jul 2024	ITF Hillcrest, South Africa	W35	Hard	(Italy) Verena Meliss	(South Africa) Isabella Kruger (South Africa) Zoë Kruger	6–2, 7–5
Win	22–14	Aug 2024	ITF Brașov, Romania	W35	Hard	(Slovakia) Nina Vargová	(Ukraine) Maryna Kolb (Ukraine) Nadiia Kolb	6–3, 6–4
Loss	22–15	Nov 2024	ITF Solarino, Italy	W35	Carpet	(Italy) Federica Urgesi	(Greece) Valentini Grammatikopoulou (Slovakia) Katarína Kužmová	3–6, 3–6
Loss	22–16	Jun 2025	ITF Tashkent, Uzbekistan	W15	Hard	(Thailand) Punnin Kovapitukted	Daria Khomutsianskaya; Daria Zelinskaya	6–4, 1–6, [9–11]
Loss	22–17	Jun 2025	ITF Kayseri, Turkiye	W15	Hard	(Slovakia) Katarína Kužmová	(France) Audrey Moutama (Italy) Lucrezia Musetti	3–6, 6–1, [7–10]
Loss	22–18	Mar 2026	ITF Nagpur, India	W15	Clay	Elina Nepliy	(Kazakhstan) Zhibek Kulambayeva; Ekaterina Yashina	7–6, 4–6, [6–10]
Loss	22–19	Mar 2026	ITF Panipat, India	W15	Hard	Ekaterina Yashina	(India) Akanksha Nitture (Japan) Michika Ozeki	6–0, 4–6, [5–10]
Win	23–19	Apr 2026	ITF New Delhi, India	W15	Hard	Ekaterina Yashina	Arina Arifullina (Japan) Michika Ozeki	6–4, 6–3
Win	24–19	May 2026	ITF Tumkur, India	W35	Hard	Elina Nepliy	(India) Vaidehi Chaudhari (Poland) Zuzanna Pawlikowska	walkover
