= 2025 Open delle Puglie =

- Date: 2–8 June
- Edition: 4th
- Category: WTA 125
- Draw: 32S / 8D
- Surface: Clay
- Location: Bari, Italy
- Venue: Circolo del Tennis Bari

Champions

Singles
- (Romania) Anca Todoni

Doubles
- Maria Kozyreva / Iryna Shymanovich
← 2024 ·	Open delle Puglie	· 2026 →

The 2025 Open delle Puglie was a professional women's tennis tournament played on outdoor clay courts. It was the fourth edition of the tournament and part of the 2025 WTA 125 tournaments. It took place at the Circolo del Tennis at the Via Martinez in Bari, Italy between 2 and 8 June 2025.

== Singles entrants ==
=== Seeds ===
Country	Player	Rank^{1}	Seed
	Polina Kudermetova	58	1
BUL	Viktoriya Tomova	64	2
HUN	Anna Bondár	82	3
ROU	Anca Todoni	88	4
SUI	Jil Teichmann	97	5
UKR	Anhelina Kalinina	113	6
ESP	Nuria Párrizas Díaz	114	7
USA	Varvara Lepchenko	118	8

- ^{1} Rankings are as of 26 May 2025.

=== Other entrants ===
The following players received a wildcard into the singles main draw:

- (Italy) Eleonora Alvisi
- Polina Kudermetova
- (Italy) Vittoria Paganetti
- (Italy) Federica Urgesi

The following player received entry using a protected ranking:

- Alina Korneeva

The following player received entry as an alternate:

- (Japan) Haruka Kaji

The following players received entry from the qualifying draw:

- (Spain) Ángela Fita Boluda
- (Australia) Astra Sharma
- (Netherlands) Eva Vedder
- (Japan) Mei Yamaguchi

=== Withdrawals ===
- (France) Loïs Boisson → replaced by (Spain) Guiomar Maristany
- (Italy) Lucia Bronzetti → replaced by Tatiana Prozorova
- (Italy) Elisabetta Cocciaretto → replaced by (Japan) Haruka Kaji
- (Hungary) Dalma Gálfi → replaced by (Czech Republic) Barbora Palicová
- (France) Chloé Paquet → replaced by (France) Tessah Andrianjafitrimo
- (Germany) Laura Siegemund → replaced by (Czech Republic) Dominika Šalková
- (Argentina) Solana Sierra → replaced by (Australia) Arina Rodionova

== Doubles entrants ==
=== Seeds ===
Country	Player	Country	Player	Rank^{1}	Seed
USA	Quinn Gleason	BRA	Ingrid Martins	176	1
NED	Eva Vedder	BEL	Kimberley Zimmermann	220	2

- ^{1} rankings as of 26 May 2025.

=== Other entrants ===
The following pair received a wildcard into the doubles main draw:

- (Italy) Vittoria Paganetti / (Italy) Federica Urgesi

== Champions ==
=== Singles ===
- (Romania) Anca Todoni def. (Hungary) Anna Bondár 6–7^{(4–7)}, 6–4, 6–4

=== Doubles ===
- Maria Kozyreva / Iryna Shymanovich def. (United States) Quinn Gleason / (Brazil) Ingrid Martins 3–6, 6–4, [10–7]
