= Tamara Zidanšek =

Slovenian tennis player (born 1997)

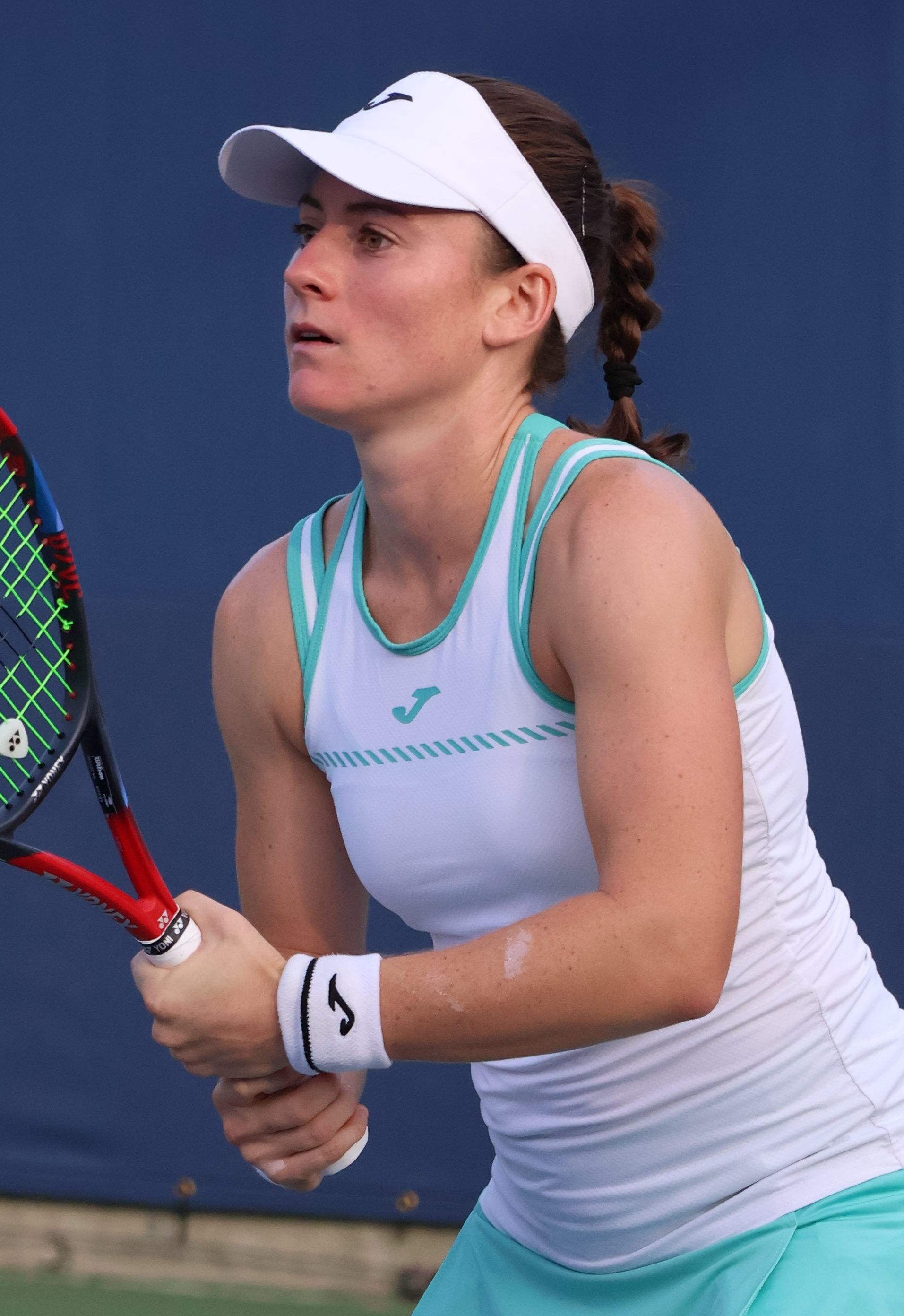
- Zidanšek at the 2023 US Open
- Country (sports): Slovenia
- Residence: Dubai, U.A.E.
- Born: 26 December 1997 (age 28) Postojna, Slovenia
- Height: 1.68 m (5 ft 6 in)
- Plays: Right (two-handed backhand)
- Prize money: US$ 3,871,209

Singles
- Career record: 395–225
- Career titles: 1
- Highest ranking: No. 22 (28 February 2022)
- Current ranking: No. 142 (28 September 2026)

Grand Slam singles results
- Australian Open: 3R (2022)
- French Open: SF (2021)
- Wimbledon: 2R (2019)
- US Open: 2R (2021)

Doubles
- Career record: 113–76
- Career titles: 4
- Highest ranking: No. 47 (16 January 2023)
- Current ranking: No. 418 (28 September 2026)

Grand Slam doubles results
- Australian Open: 2R (2021, 2022)
- French Open: 2R (2020, 2021, 2022)
- Wimbledon: 2R (2019, 2021)
- US Open: 1R (2019, 2021, 2022)

Team competitions
- Fed Cup: 14–14
- Last updated on: 5 October 2026.

Tamara Zidanšek (Slovene: [zíːdanˈʃɛːk]; born 26 December 1997) is a Slovenian professional tennis player. She has career-high rankings of world No. 22 in singles and No. 47 in doubles. She has won one singles title and four doubles titles on the WTA Tour, along with three singles and two doubles titles on the WTA Challenger Tour. Additionally, she has won 18 titles in singles and six in doubles on the ITF World Tennis Tour.

In juniors, she reached a career-high ranking of No. 16 in December 2015.

Playing for the Slovenia Fed Cup team, she has a win–loss record of 14–14 (as of September 2026).

== Career ==
=== 2014-2019: Professional debut, WTA Tour semifinals ===
Zidanšek made a perfect professional debut in 2014 at her home in Velenje, passing three qualifying rounds to go in the main draw and claim her first title on the pro-level at the age of 16.

In 2019, Zidanšek reached her second WTA Tour quarterfinal and then second semifinal (after reaching her first semifinal at the 2018 Moscow River Cup) in Hua Hin, Thailand, defeating Jennifer Brady and Viktorija Golubic.

=== 2021: Major semifinal, top 50, top-10 win, WTA Tour title ===
Ranked No. 85, Zidanšek reached the semifinals of a Grand Slam championship for the first time at the 2021 French Open, defeating Sorana Cîrstea in straight sets and Paula Badosa in three sets. These wins made her the first Slovenian female player to accomplish this since the country became independent in 1991. As a result, Zidanšek entered the top 50 at world No. 47 in the WTA single rankings for the first time on 14 June 2021. She also scored her first top-ten win in the first round, against the No. 6 seed, Bianca Andreescu. In her semifinal match, Zidanšek was defeated by Anastasia Pavlyuchenkova in straight sets.

At the Ladies Open Lausanne, as the top seed, Zidanšek beat Marina Melnikova, Mandy Minella, Lucia Bronzetti, Maryna Zanevska and Clara Burel to win her first WTA Tour singles title.

=== 2022: Top 25, two major third rounds ===
Seeded 29th at the Australian Open, she reached the third round for the first time, but lost to Alizé Cornet. At the French Open, Zidanšek also reached the third round in which she lost to Jessica Pegula, in straight sets.

=== 2023-2024: Third WTA 125 title ===
After saving four championship points and defeating Rebecca Šramková in the final, Zidanšek won the WTA 125 tournament in Bari. As a result, she moved 30 positions up in the rankings back to the top 100 on 11 September 2023.

She qualified for the 2024 French Open defeating Hailey Baptiste in the final qualifying round. In the main draw, she defeated Alison Van Uytvanck, to set up a match against world No. 3, Coco Gauff, which she lost in straight sets.

Ranked No. 261 at the Thailand Open, Zidanšek reached her first WTA Tour semifinal since January 2022 coming back from a set down to beat Tatiana Prozorova, sixth seed Katie Volynets, and Nadia Podoroska, saving four match points in the quarterfinals. She lost in the last four to eventual champion, Rebecca Šramková.

=== 2025: ===
Zidanšek qualified for the main draw of the Australian Open, before losing to Anastasia Potapova in the first round.

== Coaches ==
Zidanšek was coached by Zoran Krajnc until April 2021. In May 2021, her team signed with Pancho Alvariño from Spain. Carl Maes joined the team in December 2021 for a period of one year. After a few coaching trials, she was coached by former Slovenian ATP Tour player Blaž Kavčič until June 2024.

== Performance timelines ==
Key
W	F	SF	QF	#R	RR	Q#	P#	DNQ	A	Z#	PO	G	S	B	NMS	NTI	P	NH

(W) winner; (F) finalist; (SF) semifinalist; (QF) quarterfinalist; (#R) rounds 4, 3, 2, 1; (RR) round-robin stage; (Q#) qualification round; (P#) preliminary round; (DNQ) did not qualify; (A) absent; (Z#) Davis/Fed Cup Zonal Group (with number indication) or (PO) play-off; (G) gold, (S) silver or (B) bronze Olympic/Paralympic medal; (NMS) not a Masters tournament; (NTI) not a Tier I tournament; (P) postponed; (NH) not held; (SR) strike rate (events won / competed); (W–L) win–loss record.
To avoid confusion and double counting, these charts are updated at the conclusion of a tournament or when the player's participation has ended.

Only main-draw results in WTA Tour, Grand Slam tournaments, Billie Jean King Cup, United Cup, Hopman Cup and Olympic Games are included in win–loss records.

=== Singles ===
Current through the 2026 US Open.

Tournament	2017	2018	2019	2020	2021	2022	2023	2024	2025	2026	SR	W–L	Win %
Grand Slam tournaments
Australian Open	Q1	Q2	2R	2R	1R	3R	1R	1R	1R	Q3	0 / 7	4–7	36%
French Open	Q1	Q2	1R	1R	SF	3R	1R	2R	Q2	Q2	0 / 6	7–6	54%
Wimbledon	Q1	Q3	2R	NH	1R	1R	Q2	Q2	Q1	Q1	0 / 3	1–3	25%
US Open	A	1R	1R	A	2R	1R	Q3	Q1	Q1	1R	0 / 5	1–5	17%
Win–loss	0–0	0–1	2–4	1–2	6–4	3–4	0–2	1–2	0–1	0–1	0 / 21	13–21	38%
National representation
Billie Jean King Cup (Note: Formerly known as Fed Cup until 2020.)	Z2	Z1	A	Z1 (Note: Edition is split into the two years due to COVID-19.)		PO	SF	PO			0 / 0	8–6	57%
WTA 1000
Dubai / Qatar Open (Note: The first Premier 5 event of the year has switched back and forth between the Dubai Tennis Championships and the Qatar Ladies Open since 2009. Dubai was classified as a Premier 5 event from 2009 to 2011 before being succeeded by Doha for the 2012–2014 period. In 2015, Dubai regained its Premier 5 status while Doha was demoted to Premier status. The Premier 5 tournaments were reclassified as WTA 1000 tournaments in 2021.)	A	A	A	A	A	A	A	A	A	A	0 / 0	0–0	–
Indian Wells Open	A	A	A	NH	3R	2R	A	A	A	A	0 / 2	1–2	33%
Miami Open	A	A	1R	NH	Q2	2R	Q2	Q1	A	A	0 / 2	0–2	0%
Madrid Open	A	A	A	NH	2R	2R	A	A	A	A	0 / 2	2–2	50%
Italian Open	A	A	1R	A	1R	1R	A	A	A	A	0 / 3	0–3	0%
Canadian Open	A	A	A	NH	A	A	A	A	A	A	0 / 0	0–0	–
Cincinnati Open	A	A	A	A	1R	A	A	A	A	A	0 / 1	0–1	0%
Guadalajara Open	NH					A	A	A	A	A	0 / 0	0–0	–
China Open	A	A	Q2	NH			A	Q1	A	A	0 / 0	0–0	–
Wuhan Open	A	A	1R	NH				A	A		0 / 1	0–1	0%
Win–loss	0–0	0–0	0–3	0–0	2–4	1–4	0–0	0–0	0–0	0–0	0 / 11	3–11	21%
Career statistics
	2017	2018	2019	2020	2021	2022	2023	2024	2025	2026	SR	W–L	Win %
Tournaments	0 (Note: During the season, she did not play in the main draw of any tour-level tournaments. However, she played at the Billie Jean King Cup, which is not counted as a played tournament but matches count.)	7	18	9	19	19	8	6	1	0	Career total: 87		
Titles	0	0	0	0	1	0	0	0	0	0	Career total: 1		
Finals	0	0	1	0	2	0	0	0	0	0	Career total: 3		
Hard win–loss	3–0	4–5	4–8	5–9	8–12	8–8	2–5	3–4	0–1	0–1	0 / 50	37–53	41%
Clay win–loss	0–0	5–3	9–8	1–3	16–5	4–7	5–4	1–2	0–0	0–0	1 / 31	41–32	56%
Grass win–loss	0–0	0–0	2–2	NH	0–1	2–4	0–0	0–0	0–0	0–0	0 / 7	4–7	36%
Overall win–loss	3–0	9–8	15–18	6–12	24–18	14–19	7–9	4–6	0–1	0–1	1 / 87	82–92	47%
Year-end ranking (Note: 2014: WTA ranking–741, 2015: WTA ranking–309, 2016: WTA ranking–223.)	180	70	64	87	30	87	100	182	162		$3,871,209		

=== Doubles ===
Tournament	2018	2019	2020	2021	2022	2023	SR	W–L	Win %
Grand Slam tournaments
Australian Open	A	A	1R	2R	2R	1R	0 / 4	2–4	33%
French Open	A	1R	2R	2R	2R	1R	0 / 5	3–5	38%
Wimbledon	A	2R	NH	2R	1R	A	0 / 3	2–3	40%
US Open	A	1R	A	1R	1R	A	0 / 3	0–3	0%
Win–loss	0–0	1–3	1–2	3–4	2–4	0–2	0 / 15	7–15	32%
WTA 1000
Miami Open	A	A	NH	1R	1R	A	0 / 2	0–2	0%
Madrid Open	A	A	NH	A	2R	A	0 / 1	1–1	50%
Career statistics
Titles	1	0	2	0	1	0	Career total: 4		
Finals	1	1	2	0	3	0	Career total: 7		

== WTA Tour finals ==
=== Singles: 3 (1 title, 2 runner-ups) ===
Legend WTA 500 WTA 250 (1–2)	Finals by surface Clay (1–2)

Result	W–L	Date	Tournament	Tier	Surface	Opponent	Score
Loss	0–1	May 2019	Nuremberg Cup, Germany	International (Note: The WTA International tournaments were reclassified as WTA 250 tournaments in 2021.)	Clay	(Kazakhstan) Yulia Putintseva	6–4, 4–6, 2–6
Loss	0–2	Apr 2021	Copa Colsanitas, Colombia	WTA 250	Clay	(Colombia) Camila Osorio	7–5, 3–6, 4–6
Win	1–2	Jul 2021	Ladies Open Lausanne, Switzerland	WTA 250	Clay	(France) Clara Burel	4–6, 7–6^{(7–5)}, 6–1

=== Doubles: 7 (4 titles, 3 runner-ups) ===
Legend WTA 1000 WTA 500 (0–1) WTA 250 (4–2)	Finals by surface Hard (2–1) Clay (1–2) Grass (1–0)

Result	W–L	Date	Tournament	Tier	Surface	Partner	Opponents	Score
Win	1–0	Sep 2018	Tashkent Open, Uzbekistan	International	Hard	(Serbia) Olga Danilović	(Romania) Irina-Camelia Begu (Romania) Raluca Olaru	7–5, 6–3
Loss	1–1	Sep 2019	Zhengzhou Open, China	Premier (Note: The WTA Premier tournaments were reclassified as WTA 500 tournaments in 2021.)	Hard	(Belgium) Yanina Wickmayer	(United States) Nicole Melichar (Czech Republic) Květa Peschke	1–6, 6–7^{(2–7)}
Win	2–1	Aug 2020	Palermo Ladies Open, Italy	International	Clay	(Netherlands) Arantxa Rus	(Italy) Elisabetta Cocciaretto (Italy) Martina Trevisan	7–5, 7–5
Win	3–1	Nov 2020	Linz Open, Austria	International	Hard (i)	(Netherlands) Arantxa Rus	(Czech Republic) Lucie Hradecká (Czech Republic) Kateřina Siniaková	6–3, 6–4
Win	4–1	Jun 2022	Rosmalen Open, Netherlands	WTA 250	Grass	(Australia) Ellen Perez	(Russia) Veronika Kudermetova (Belgium) Elise Mertens	6–3, 5–7, [12–10]
Loss	4–2	Jul 2022	Ladies Open Lausanne, Switzerland	WTA 250	Clay	(Norway) Ulrikke Eikeri	(Serbia) Olga Danilović (France) Kristina Mladenovic	w/o
Loss	4–3	Oct 2022	Parma Open, Italy	WTA 250	Clay	(Netherlands) Arantxa Rus	(Czech Republic) Anastasia Dețiuc (Czech Republic) Miriam Kolodziejová	6–1, 3–6, [8–10]

== WTA 125 finals ==
=== Singles: 4 (3 titles, 1 runner-up) ===
Result	W–L	Date	Tournament	Surface	Opponent	Score
Win	1–0	Jun 2018	Bol Ladies Open, Croatia	Clay	(Poland) Magda Linette	6–1, 6–3
Win	2–0	Jun 2019	Bol Ladies Open, Croatia (2)	Clay	(Spain) Sara Sorribes Tormo	7–5, 7–5
Win	3–0	Sep 2023	Bari Open, Italy	Clay	(Slovakia) Rebecca Šramková	3–6, 7–5, 6–1
Loss	3–1	Mar 2026	Antalya Challenger, Turkey	Clay	(Ukraine) Anhelina Kalinina	0–6, 3–6

=== Doubles: 4 (2 titles, 2 runner-ups) ===
Result	W–L	Date	Tournament	Surface	Partner	Opponents	Score
Loss	0–1	Nov 2022	Copa Colina, Chile	Clay	(Egypt) Mayar Sherif	Yana Sizikova (Indonesia) Aldila Sutjiadi	1–6, 6–3, [7–10]
Win	1–1	Mar 2024	San Luis Open, Mexico	Clay	(Hungary) Anna Bondár	(Brazil) Laura Pigossi (Poland) Katarzyna Piter	walkover
Win	2–1	Jul 2026	Palermo Ladies Open, Italy	Clay	Anastasia Tikhonova	(United States) Rasheeda McAdoo (Hungary) Adrienn Nagy	6–4, 6–4
Loss	2–2	Nov 2026	Cundinamarca Open, Colombia	Clay	(Czech Republic) Laura Samson	(Slovenia) Veronika Erjavec (Kazakhstan) Zhibek Kulambayeva	7–5, 2–6, [12–14]

== ITF Circuit finals ==
=== Singles: 26 (18 titles, 8 runner-ups) ===
Legend W60/75 tournaments W25 tournaments W10/15 tournaments	Finals by surface Hard (3–3) Clay (15–4) Carpet (0–1)

Result	W–L	Date	Tournament	Tier	Surface	Opponent	Score
Win	1–0	May 2014	ITF Velenje, Slovenia	10,000	Clay	(Austria) Barbara Haas	4–6, 6–2, 6–3
Loss	1–1	May 2015	ITF Bol, Croatia	10,000	Clay	(Croatia) Tena Lukas	2–6, 3–6
Win	2–1	Jun 2015	ITF Banja Luka, Bosnia and Herzegovina	10,000	Clay	(Serbia) Marina Kachar	6–4, 2–6, 7–5
Win	3–1	Jun 2015	Telavi Open, Georgia	10,000	Clay	(Belarus) Sadafmoh Tolibova	6–4, 6–1
Win	4–1	Jun 2015	Telavi Open, Georgia	10,000	Clay	(Hungary) Szabina Szlavikovics	6–3, 6–3
Win	5–1	Aug 2015	ITF Arad, Romania	10,000	Clay	(Slovakia) Chantal Škamlová	6–1, 6–3
Loss	5–2	Aug 2015	ITF Bagnatica, Italy	15,000	Clay	(Germany) Anne Schäfer	6–2, 1–6, 2–6
Win	6–2	Sep 2015	ITF Dobrich, Bulgaria	25,000	Clay	(Russia) Polina Leykina	6–3, 6–2
Loss	6–3	Apr 2016	ITF Hammamet, Tunisia	10,000	Clay	(Romania) Irina Bara	3–6, 3–6
Win	7–3	Apr 2016	ITF Hammamet, Tunisia	10,000	Clay	(France) Alice Bacquié	6–1, 6–0
Win	8–3	May 2016	ITF Győr, Hungary	25,000	Clay	(Russia) Ekaterina Alexandrova	6–4, 6–4
Win	9–3	May 2016	Hódmezővásárhely Ladies Open, Hungary	25,000	Clay	(Czech Republic) Karolína Muchová	4–6, 6–2, 6–4
Win	10–3	Dec 2016	ITF Santiago, Chile	25,000	Clay	(Brazil) Paula Cristina Gonçalves	6–1, 6–4
Win	11–3	Dec 2016	ITF Pune, India	25,000	Hard	(Russia) Polina Monova	6–4, 6–2
Loss	11–4	Dec 2016	ITF Navi Mumbai, India	25,000	Hard	(China) Lu Jiajing	3–6, 1–6
Loss	11–5	Feb 2017	Launceston International, Australia	60,000	Hard	(United States) Jamie Loeb	6–7^{(4)}, 3–6
Win	12–5	Sep 2017	ITF Pula, Italy	25,000	Clay	(Croatia) Tereza Mrdeža	7–6^{(4)}, 7–5
Win	13–5	Nov 2017	Bendigo International, Australia	60,000	Hard	(Australia) Olivia Rogowska	5–7, 6–1, 6–0
Loss	13–6	Nov 2017	Toyota World Challenge, Japan	60,000	Carpet (i)	(Romania) Mihaela Buzărnescu	0–6, 1–6
Win	14–6	Feb 2018	ITF Curitiba, Brazil	25,000	Clay	(France) Fiona Ferro	7–5, 6–4
Loss	14–7	Mar 2018	ITF São Paulo, Brazil	25,000	Clay	(Austria) Julia Grabher	4–6, 6–3, 2–6
Win	15–7	Apr 2018	ITF Pula, Italy	25,000	Clay	(Italy) Anastasia Grymalska	6–3, 6–1
Win	16–7	Apr 2018	ITF Pula, Italy	25,000	Clay	(France) Myrtille Georges	6–1, 7–6^{(4)}
Win	17–7	Dec 2018	Pune Open, India	25,000	Hard	(India) Karman Thandi	6–3, 6–4
Loss	17–8	Oct 2022	Open Monastir, Tunisia	W60	Hard	(France) Kristina Mladenovic	1–6, 6–3, 5–7
Win	18–8	Jun 2025	ITF Bucharest, Romania	W75	Clay	(Italy) Nuria Brancaccio	6–1, 7–5

=== Doubles: 10 (6 titles, 4 runner-ups) ===
Legend W100 tournaments W60/75 tournaments W25 tournaments W10 tournaments	Finals by surface Hard (1–3) Clay (5–1)

Result	W–L	Date	Tournament	Tier	Surface	Partner	Opponents	Score
Win	1–0	Apr 2015	ITF Bol, Croatia	10,000	Clay	(Slovenia) Pia Čuk	(Slovenia) Natalija Šipek (Slovenia) Eva Zagorac	6–1, 6–1
Loss	1–1	May 2015	ITF Bol, Croatia	10,000	Clay	(Slovenia) Pia Čuk	(Russia) Anastasiya Komardina (Slovakia) Zuzana Luknárová	2–6, 6–0, [7–10]
Win	2–1	Aug 2015	ITF Tarvisio, Italy	10,000	Clay	(Slovenia) Pia Čuk	(Italy) Giorgia Marchetti (Italy) Maria Masini	6–1, 6–4
Win	3–1	Oct 2016	ITF Pula, Italy	25,000	Clay	(Switzerland) Jil Teichmann	(Italy) Claudia Giovine (Italy) Camilla Rosatello	6–2, 6–4
Win	4–1	Nov 2016	ITF Santiago, Chile	25,000	Clay	(Argentina) Guadalupe Pérez Rojas	(United States) Usue Maitane Arconada (Italy) Georgia Brescia	6–3, 7–6^{(5)}
Loss	4–2	Feb 2017	Launceston International, Australia	60,000	Hard	(Italy) Georgia Brescia	(Australia) Monique Adamczak (United States) Nicole Melichar	1–6, 2–6
Loss	4–3	Dec 2017	ITF Navi Mumbai, India	25,000	Hard	(India) Pranjala Yadlapalli	(Spain) Georgina García Pérez (Latvia) Diāna Marcinkēviča	0–6, 1–6
Loss	4–4	Nov 2018	Pune Open, India	25,000	Hard	(Bulgaria) Aleksandrina Naydenova	(India) Ankita Raina (India) Karman Thandi	2–6, 7–6^{(5)}, [9–11]
Win	5–4	May 2024	Empire Slovak Open, Slovakia	W75	Clay	(Slovenia) Veronika Erjavec	(Slovenia) Dalila Jakupović (United States) Sabrina Santamaria	6–4, 6–4
Win	6–4	Aug 2024	Cary Tennis Classic, United States	W100	Hard	(Switzerland) Céline Naef	(Georgia (country)) Oksana Kalashnikova; Iryna Shymanovich	4–6, 6–3, [11–9]

== Team competitions ==
=== Fed Cup/Billie Jean King Cup ===
==== Singles (9–8) ====
Legend
Europe/Africa Group (7–5)
World Group Play-off /
Finals qualifying round (1–1)
Finals (1–2)

Edition	Stage	Date	Location	Surface	Against	Opponent	W/L	Score
2017	Z2 R/R	Apr 2017	Šiauliai (LTU)	Hard (i)	Sweden	Johanna Larsson	W	6–3, 3–6, 6–3
2017	Z2 R/R	Apr 2017	Šiauliai (LTU)	Hard (i)	South Africa	Chanel Simmonds	W	6–4, 6–2
2017	Z2 P/O	Apr 2017	Šiauliai (LTU)	Hard (i)	Luxembourg	Eléonora Molinaro	W	4–6, 7–5, 6–2
2018	Z1 R/R	Feb 2018	Tallinn (EST)	Hard (i)	Croatia	Tena Lukas	W	6–3, 6–1
2018	Z1 R/R	Feb 2018	Tallinn (EST)	Hard (i)	Hungary	Fanny Stollár	L	4–6, 4–6
2018	Z1 R/R	Feb 2018	Tallinn (EST)	Hard (i)	Sweden	Rebecca Peterson	W	4–6, 6–4, 6–2
2020–21	Z1 R/R	Feb 2020	Esch-sur-Alzette (LUX)	Hard (i)	Turkey	Pemra Özgen	L	3–6, 7–5, 2–6
2020–21	Z1 R/R	Feb 2020	Esch-sur-Alzette (LUX)	Hard (i)	Poland	Magda Linette	L	5–7, 4–6
2020–21	Z1 P/O	Feb 2020	Esch-sur-Alzette (LUX)	Hard (i)	Serbia	Nina Stojanović	L	4–6, 5–7
2022	Z1 R/R	Apr 2022	Antalya (TUR)	Clay	(Georgia (country)) Georgia	Mariam Bolkvadze	W	6–3, 6–0
2022	Z1 R/R	Apr 2022	Antalya (TUR)	Clay	Austria	Julia Grabher	L	3–6, 3–6
2022	Z1 R/R	Apr 2022	Antalya (TUR)	Clay	Croatia	Petra Martić	W	6–3, 6–2
2023	F QR	Apr 2023	Koper (SLO)	Clay	Romania	Jaqueline Cristian	L	1–6, 6–4, 3–6
2023	F QR	Apr 2023	Koper (SLO)	Clay	Romania	Ana Bogdan	W	3–6, 7–6^{(7–4)}, 7–5
2023	F	Nov 2023	Seville (ESP)	Hard (i)	Australia	Daria Saville	W	6–1, 6–4
2023	F	Nov 2023	Seville (ESP)	Hard (i)	Kazakhstan	Yulia Putintseva	L	6–2, 2–6, ret.
2023	F	Nov 2023	Seville (ESP)	Hard (i)	Italy	Jasmine Paolini	L	2–6, 6–4, 3–6

==== Doubles (3–3) ====
Legend
Europe/Africa Group (2–3)
World Group Play-off / Finals qualifying round (1–0)

Edition	Round	Date	Location	Surface	Partnering	Against	Opponents	W/L	Result
2018	Z1 R/R	Feb 2018	Tallinn (EST)	Hard (i)	Nina Potočnik	Croatia	Darija Jurak; Tena Lukas	L	1–6, 3–6
2018	Z1 R/R	Feb 2018	Tallinn (EST)	Hard (i)	Kaja Juvan	Hungary	Dalma Gálfi; Fanny Stollár	L	4–6, 3–6
2020–21	Z1 R/R	Feb 2020	Esch-sur-Alzette (LUX)	Hard (i)	Dalila Jakupović	Turkey	Ayla Aksu; İpek Öz	W	6–0, 6–4
2020–21	Z1 P/O	Feb 2020	Esch-sur-Alzette (LUX)	Hard (i)	Kaja Juvan	Serbia	Aleksandra Krunić; Nina Stojanović	L	4–6, 4–6
2022	Z1 R/R	Apr 2022	Antalya (TUR)	Clay	Kaja Juvan	Austria	Melanie Klaffner; Sinja Kraus	W	2–6, 6–4, 6–2
2023	F QR	Apr 2023	Koper (SLO)	Clay	Kaja Juvan	Romania	Irina Bara; Monica Niculescu	W	4–6, 6–2, 6–4

== WTA Tour career earnings ==
Current through the 2022 Australian Open

Year	Grand Slam singles titles	WTA singles titles	Total singles titles	Earnings ($)	Money list rank
2014	0	0	0	2,222	1024
2015	0	0	0	15,545	404
2016	0	0	0	19,076	369
2017	0	0	0	33,251	324
2018	0	0	0	215,778	152
2019	0	0	0	474,370	93
2020	0	0	0	217,297	116
2021	0	1	1	947,471	32
2022	0	0	0	202,053	30
Career	0	1	1	2,163,720	247

== Head-to-head record ==
=== Record against top 10 players ===
Zidanšek has a 1–7 (13%) record against players who, at the time the matches were played, were ranked in the top 10.

Season	2019	2020	2021	2022	2023	Total
Wins	0	0	1	0	0	1
Losses	2	1	2	1	1	7

Result	W–L	Opponent	Rank	Event	Surface	Rd	Score	Rank
2019
Loss	0–1	(Japan) Naomi Osaka	4	Australian Open, Australia	Hard	2R	2–6, 4–6	78
Loss	0–2	(Belarus) Aryna Sabalenka	10	Eastbourne International, UK	Grass	2R	2–6, 3–6	59
2020
Loss	0–3	(United States) Serena Williams	9	Australian Open, Australia	Hard	2R	2–6, 3–6	70
2021
Loss	0–4	(Australia) Ashleigh Barty	1	Madrid Open, Spain	Clay	2R	4–6, 6–1, 3–6	80
Win	1–4	(Canada) Bianca Andreescu	7	French Open, France	Clay	1R	6–7^{(1–7)}, 7–6^{(7–2)}, 9–7	85
Loss	1–5	(Belarus) Aryna Sabalenka	2	US Open, United States	Hard	2R	3–6, 1–6	40
2022
Loss	1–6	(Greece) Maria Sakkari	6	Adelaide International 1, Australia	Hard	1R	2–6, 6–0, 4–6	30
2023
Loss	1–7	(Tunisia) Ons Jabeur	2	Australian Open, Australia	Hard	1R	6–7^{(8–10)}, 6–4, 1–6	98
