= Bunyawi Thamchaiwat =

Thai tennis player

Bunyawi Thamchaiwat บุณยวีร์ ธรรมไชยวัฒน์
- Country (sports): Thailand
- Residence: Nakhon Ratchasima
- Born: 29 July 1998 (age 27) Nakhon Ratchasima
- Plays: Right-handed (two-handed backhand)
- Prize money: $54,737

Singles
- Career record: 143–98
- Career titles: 4 ITF
- Highest ranking: No. 410 (24 September 2018)
- Current ranking: No. 573 (21 July 2025)

Doubles
- Career record: 58–48
- Career titles: 5 ITF
- Highest ranking: No. 449 (21 April 2025)
- Current ranking: No. 673 (21 July 2025)

Team competitions
- Fed Cup: 3–0
- Last updated on: 21 July 2025.

Bunyawi Thamchaiwat (Thai: บุณยวีร์ ธรรมไชยวัฒน์; born 29 July 1998) is a Thai tennis player.

== Career ==
She has won four singles and five doubles titles on the ITF Women's Circuit. On 24 September 2018, she reached her best singles ranking of world No. 410, and on 21 April 2025 No. 449 in the doubles rankings.

Playing for Thailand Fed Cup team, Thamchaiwat has a win–loss record of 3–0.

Thamchaiwat made her WTA Tour main-draw debut at the 2024 Thailand Open 2, in the doubles event, partnering Thasaporn Naklo. In the First round, Belgian Lara Salden and Kimberley Zimmermann were defeated in both sets.

== ITF Circuit finals ==
=== Singles: 10 (4 titles, 6 runner–ups) ===
Legend W25/35 tournaments W15 tournaments	Finals by surface Hard (4–6)

Result	W–L	Date	Tournament	Tier	Surface	Opponent	Score
Win	1–0	May 2015	ITF Bangkok, Thailand	W10	Hard	(Thailand) Nungnadda Wannasuk	6–7^{(4)}, 6–3, ret.
Loss	1–1	Sep 2015	ITF Bangkok, Thailand	W15	Hard	(Japan) Hiroko Kuwata	3–6, 6–7^{(4)}
Win	2–1	Oct 2016	ITF Hua Hin, Thailand	W10	Hard	(Serbia) Natalija Kostić	6–1, 6–3
Loss	2–2	Jul 2017	ITF Hua Hin, Thailand	W15	Hard	(Chinese Taipei) Lee Hua-chen	2–6, 0–3 ret.
Win	3–2	Dec 2017	ITF Solapur, India	W15	Hard	(Russia) Olga Doroshina	7–6^{(2)}, 6–3
Loss	3–3	Feb 2018	ITF Sharm El Sheikh, Egypt	W15	Hard	(Slovenia) Nastja Kolar	2–6, 4–6
Win	4–3	May 2018	ITF Hua Hin, Thailand	W15	Hard	(Thailand) Nudnida Luangnam	6–1, 6–1
Loss	4–4	May 2018	ITF Hua Hin, Thailand	W15	Hard	(Thailand) Mananchaya Sawangkaew	6–1, 6–7^{(3)}, 1–2 ret.
Loss	4–5	Jul 2019	ITF Hua Hin, Thailand	W15	Hard	(France) Lou Brouleau	2–6, 3–6
Loss	4–6	Dec 2024	ITF Solapur, India	W35	Hard	(India) Shrivalli Bhamidipaty	5–7, 3–6

=== Doubles: 10 (5 titles, 5 runner–ups) ===
Legend W35 tournaments W15 tournaments	Finals by surface Hard (5–5)

Result	W–L	Date	Tournament	Tier	Surface	Partner	Opponents	Score
Win	1–0	May 2018	ITF Hua Hin, Thailand	W15	Hard	(India) Zeel Desai	(China) Sheng Yuqi (Indonesia) Aldila Sutjiadi	7–5, 6–1
Win	2–0	Sep 2018	ITF Nonthaburi, Thailand	W15	Hard	(Thailand) Nudnida Luangnam	(Chinese Taipei) Cho I-hsuan (China) Wang Danni	6–2, 6–0
Loss	2–1	Nov 2018	ITF Nonthaburi, Thailand	W15	Hard	(Japan) Ramu Ueda	(Thailand) Nudnida Luangnam (Thailand) Varunya Wongteanchai	6–2, 4–6, [7–10]
Win	3–1	Dec 2018	ITF Hua Hin, Thailand	W15	Hard	(Thailand) Nudnida Luangnam	(Japan) Ayaka Okuno (Indonesia) Aldila Sutjiadi	6–4, 6–2
Loss	3–2	Sep 2019	ITF Lawrence, United States	W15	Hard	(Japan) Ayumi Miyamoto	(United States) Malkia Ngounoue (Spain) María Toran Ribes	6–4, 2–6, [6–10]
Win	4–2	Jun 2022	ITF San Diego, United States	W15	Hard	(Chinese Taipei) Yang Ya-yi	(United States) Sara Daavettila (United States) Makenna Jones	6–3, 6–4
Loss	4–3	Jul 2022	ITF Los Angeles, United States	W15	Hard	(Chinese Taipei) Yang Ya-yi	(United States) Eryn Cayetano (United States) Salma Ewing	3–6, 6–4, [8–10]
Win	5–3	Dec 2024	ITF Solapur, India	W35	Hard	(Thailand) Thasaporn Naklo	(India) Akanksha Dileep Nitture (India) Soha Sadiq	6–4, 6–2
Loss	5–4	Jul 2025	ITF Nakhon Pathom, Thailand	W15	Hard	(Thailand) Thasaporn Naklo	(South Korea) Kim Na-ri (China) Ye Qiuyu	2–6, 3–6
Loss	5–5	Jul 2026	ITF Lu'an, China	W15	Hard	(Singapore) Eva Marie Desvignes	(South Korea) Choi On-yu (South Korea) Lee Ha-eum	3–6, 0–6
