= Open Delle Puglie =

Open delle Puglie
- 2026 Open delle Puglie

WTA 125
- Event name: Open delle Puglie
- Tour: WTA Tour
- Founded: 2022
- Location: Bari (2022–25); Foggia (2026–), Italy
- Venue: Circolo Tennis Bari (2022–25); Circolo Tennis Club Foggia (2026–)
- Category: WTA 125
- Surface: Clay - outdoors
- Draw: 32S / 8D
- Prize money: €100,000 (2026)
- Website: circolotennisbari.it

Current champions (2026)
- Singles: (Spain) Leyre Romero Gormaz
- Doubles: (Chinese Taipei) Cho I-hsuan (Chinese Taipei) Cho Yi-tsen

The Open delle Puglie is a WTA 125-level professional women's tennis tournament. It takes place on outdoor clay courts, in the month of June in the city of Foggia, Italy, The tournament was staged in Bari between 2022 and 2025. In 2022 the event took place during the second week of the US Open.

== Results ==
=== Singles ===
Year	Champion	Runner-up	Score
2026	(Spain) Leyre Romero Gormaz	(Italy) Tyra Caterina Grant	7–5, 0–6, 6–2
2025	(Romania) Anca Todoni (2)	(Hungary) Anna Bondár	6–7^{(4–7)}, 6–4, 6–4
2024	(Romania) Anca Todoni	(Hungary) Panna Udvardy	6–4, 6–0
2023	(Slovenia) Tamara Zidanšek	(Slovakia) Rebecca Šramková	3–6, 7–5, 6–1
2022	(Austria) Julia Grabher	(Italy) Nuria Brancaccio	6–4, 6–2

=== Doubles ===
Year	Champions	Runners-up	Score
2026	(Chinese Taipei) Cho I-hsuan (Chinese Taipei) Cho Yi-tsen	(France) Estelle Cascino (Slovenia) Nika Radišić	4–6, 6–3, [10–4]
2025	Maria Kozyreva; Iryna Shymanovich	(United States) Quinn Gleason (Brazil) Ingrid Martins	3–6, 6–4, [10–7]
2024	(Kazakhstan) Anna Danilina; Irina Khromacheva	(Italy) Angelica Moratelli (Mexico) Renata Zarazúa	6–1, 6–3
2023	(Poland) Katarzyna Kawa (Czech Republic) Anna Sisková	(Greece) Valentini Grammatikopoulou (France) Elixane Lechemia	6–1, 6–2
2022	(Italy) Elisabetta Cocciaretto (Serbia) Olga Danilović	(Venezuela) Andrea Gámiz (Netherlands) Eva Vedder	6–2, 6–3

== See also ==
- Open Città di Bari
