= 2024 French Open – Day-by-day summaries =

Tennis tournament

The 2024 French Open's day-by-day summaries and order of play for main draw matches on the three main tennis courts, starting from May 20 until June 9.

All dates are in CEST.

== Day 1 (26 May) ==
- Seeds out:
  - Men's singles: (Chile) Nicolás Jarry [16], (France) Ugo Humbert [17], (Chile) Alejandro Tabilo [24]
  - Women's singles: (Czech Republic) Barbora Krejčíková [24], Veronika Kudermetova [29]
- Schedule of play

Matches on main courts
Matches on Court Philippe Chatrier (Center Court)
Event	Winner	Loser	Score
Women's singles - 1st round	(Japan) Naomi Osaka [PR]	(Italy) Lucia Bronzetti	6–1, 4–6, 7–5
Men's singles - 1st round	(Spain) Carlos Alcaraz [3]	(United States) J. J. Wolf [LL]	6–1, 6–2, 6–1
Women's singles - 1st round	(France) Caroline Garcia [21]	(Germany) Eva Lys [Q]	4–6, 7–5, 6–2
Men's singles - 1st round	(Switzerland) Stan Wawrinka	(United Kingdom) Andy Murray	6–4, 6–4, 6–2
Matches on Court Suzanne Lenglen (Grandstand)
Event	Winner	Loser	Score
Men's singles - 1st round	(Italy) Lorenzo Sonego	(France) Ugo Humbert [17]	6–4, 2–6, 6–4, 6–3
Women's singles - 1st round	(Latvia) Jeļena Ostapenko [9]	(Romania) Jaqueline Cristian	6–4, 7–5
Men's singles - 1st round	(France) Richard Gasquet [WC]	(Croatia) Borna Ćorić	7–6^{(7–5)}, 7–6^{(7–2)}, 6–4
Women's singles - 1st round	(Switzerland) Viktorija Golubic	(Czech Republic) Barbora Krejčíková [24]	7–6^{(7–3)}, 6–4
Matches on Court Simonne Mathieu
Event	Winner	Loser	Score
Men's singles - 1st round	Andrey Rublev [6]	(Japan) Taro Daniel	6–2, 6–7^{(3–7)}, 6–3, 7–5
Women's singles - 1st round	(United States) Sofia Kenin	(Germany) Laura Siegemund	4–6, 6–2, 6–2
Women's singles - 1st round	(France) Chloé Paquet [WC]	Diana Shnaider	6–3, 6–1
Men's singles - 1st round	(France) Corentin Moutet	(Chile) Nicolás Jarry [16]	6–2, 6–1, 3–6, 6–0
Coloured background indicates a night match
Day matches began at 11 am (12 pm on Court Philippe Chatrier), whilst night match began at 8:15 pm CEST

== Day 2 (27 May) ==
- Seeds out:
  - Men's singles: (France) Arthur Fils [29], (United Kingdom) Cameron Norrie [32]
  - Women's singles: (Greece) Maria Sakkari [6], (Brazil) Beatriz Haddad Maia [13], Ekaterina Alexandrova [16]
- Schedule of play

Matches on main courts
Matches on Court Philippe Chatrier (Center Court)
Event	Winner	Loser	Score
Women's singles - 1st round	(Tunisia) Ons Jabeur [8]	(United States) Sachia Vickery [WC]	6–3, 6–2
Women's singles - 1st round	(Poland) Iga Świątek [1]	(France) Léolia Jeanjean [Q]	6–1, 6–2
Men's singles - 1st round	(Germany) Alexander Zverev [4]	(Spain) Rafael Nadal [PR]	6–3, 7–6^{(7–5)}, 6–3
Men's singles - 1st round	(France) Gaël Monfils	(Brazil) Thiago Seyboth Wild	6–2, 3–6, 6–3, 6–4
Matches on Court Suzanne Lenglen (Grandstand)
Event	Winner	Loser	Score
Men's singles - 1st round	(Italy) Jannik Sinner [2]	(United States) Christopher Eubanks	6–3, 6–3, 6–4
Men's singles - 1st round	(Greece) Stefanos Tsitsipas [9]	(Hungary) Márton Fucsovics	7–6^{(9–7)}, 6–4, 6–1
Women's singles - 1st round	(United States) Coco Gauff [3]	Julia Avdeeva [Q]	6–1, 6–1
Women's singles - 1st round	(Ukraine) Elina Svitolina [15]	(Czech Republic) Karolína Plíšková	3–6, 6–4, 6–2
Women's singles - 1st round (Note: This match was originally scheduled to play on Court 14, but was moved to Court Suzanne Lenglen after the conclusion of the Svitolina-Plíšková match due to rain causing match overruns.)	(France) Diane Parry	(France) Fiona Ferro [WC]	3–6, 6–3, 6–3
Matches on Court Simonne Mathieu
Event	Winner	Loser	Score
Women's singles - 1st round	(Czech Republic) Markéta Vondroušová [5]	(Spain) Rebeka Masarova	6–1, 6–3
Men's singles - 1st round	(Italy) Matteo Arnaldi	(France) Arthur Fils [29]	6–3, 4–6, 6–4, 6–2
Women's singles - 1st round	(France) Varvara Gracheva	(Greece) Maria Sakkari [6]	3–6, 6–4, 6–3
Men's singles - 1st round	Daniil Medvedev [5]	(Germany) Dominik Koepfer	6–3, 6–4, 5–7, 6–3
Coloured background indicates a night match
Day matches began at 11 am (12 pm on Court Philippe Chatrier), whilst night match began at 8:15 pm CEST

== Day 3 (28 May) ==
- Seeds out:
  - Men's singles: (France) Adrian Mannarino [22]
  - Women's singles: (United Kingdom) Katie Boulter [26], (Romania) Sorana Cîrstea [28]
- Schedule of play

Matches on main courts
Matches on Court Philippe Chatrier (Center Court)
Event	Winner	Loser	Score
Women's singles - 1st round	(China) Zheng Qinwen [7]	(France) Alizé Cornet [WC]	6–2, 6–1
Men's singles - 1st round	(Norway) Casper Ruud [7]	(Brazil) Felipe Meligeni Alves [Q]	6–3, 6–4, 6–3
Women's singles - 1st round	Aryna Sabalenka [2]	Erika Andreeva	6–1, 6–2
Men's singles - 1st round	(Serbia) Novak Djokovic [1]	(France) Pierre-Hugues Herbert [WC]	6–4, 7–6^{(7–3)}, 6–4
Matches on Court Suzanne Lenglen (Grandstand)
Event	Winner	Loser	Score
Women's singles - 1st round	(Kazakhstan) Elena Rybakina [4]	(Belgium) Greet Minnen	6–2, 6–3
Men's singles - 1st round	(Argentina) Tomás Martín Etcheverry [28]	(France) Arthur Cazaux	3–6, 6–2, 6–1, 6–4
Women's singles - 1st round	Daria Kasatkina [10]	(Poland) Magdalena Fręch	7–5, 6–1
Men's singles - 1st round	(Denmark) Holger Rune [13]	(United Kingdom) Dan Evans	6–4, 6–4, 6–4
Men's singles - 1st round (Note: This match was moved to Court Suzanne Lenglen after the conclusion of the Evans-Rune match due to rain causing match overruns.)	(Kazakhstan) Alexander Bublik [19]	(France) Grégoire Barrère [Q]	6–4, 7–5, 6–3
Matches on Court Simonne Mathieu
Event	Winner	Loser	Score
Men's singles - 1st round	(Australia) Alex de Minaur [11]	(United States) Alex Michelsen	6–1, 6–0, 6–2
Women's singles - 1st round	(United States) Madison Keys [14]	(Mexico) Renata Zarazúa	6–3, 6–2
Women's singles - 1st round	Victoria Azarenka [19]	(Argentina) Nadia Podoroska	6–1, 6–0
Coloured background indicates a night match
Day matches began at 11 am (12 pm on Court Philippe Chatrier), whilst night match began at 8:15 pm CEST

== Day 4 (29 May) ==
- Seeds out:
  - Women's singles: (France) Caroline Garcia [21]
- Schedule of play

Matches on main courts
Matches on Court Philippe Chatrier (Center Court)
Event	Winner	Loser	Score
Women's singles - 2nd round	(United States) Sofia Kenin	(France) Caroline Garcia [21]	6–3, 6–3
Men's singles - 2nd round	(Spain) Carlos Alcaraz [3]	(Netherlands) Jesper de Jong [Q]	6–3, 6–4, 2–6, 6–2
Women's singles - 2nd round	(Poland) Iga Świątek [1]	(Japan) Naomi Osaka [PR]	7–6^{(7–1)}, 1–6, 7–5
Men's singles - 2nd round	(Italy) Jannik Sinner [2]	(France) Richard Gasquet [WC]	6–4, 6–2, 6–4
Matches on Court Suzanne Lenglen (Grandstand)
Event	Winner	Loser	Score
Men's singles - 2nd round	(Greece) Stefanos Tsitsipas [9]	(Germany) Daniel Altmaier	6–3, 6–2, 6–7^{(2–7)}, 6–4
Women's singles - 2nd round	(Tunisia) Ons Jabeur [8]	(Colombia) Camila Osorio	6–3, 1–6, 6–3
Men's singles - 2nd round	Andrey Rublev [6]	(Spain) Pedro Martínez	6–3, 6–4, 6–3
Women's singles - 2nd round	(United States) Coco Gauff [3]	(Slovenia) Tamara Zidanšek [Q]	6–3, 6–4
Men's singles - 2nd round (Note: This match was originally scheduled to play on Court 14, but was moved to Court Suzanne Lenglen due to rain halting play on outer courts.)	Pavel Kotov	(Switzerland) Stan Wawrinka	7–6^{(7–5)}, 6–4, 1–6, 7–6^{(7–5)}
Matches on Court Simonne Mathieu
Event	Winner	Loser	Score
Men's singles - 2nd round	(Poland) Hubert Hurkacz [8] vs (United States) Brandon Nakashima		5–6, suspended
Women's singles - 2nd round	(United States) Danielle Collins [11] vs (Serbia) Olga Danilović		postponed
Men's singles - 2nd round	(France) Corentin Moutet vs (Kazakhstan) Alexander Shevchenko		postponed
Coloured background indicates a night match
Day matches began at 11 am (12 pm on Court Philippe Chatrier), whilst night match began at 8:15 pm CEST

== Day 5 (30 May) ==
- Seeds out:
  - Men's singles: Karen Khachanov [18], (Kazakhstan) Alexander Bublik [19], (Argentina) Sebastián Báez [20], (United States) Frances Tiafoe [25], (Argentina) Mariano Navone [31]
  - Women's singles: (Latvia) Jeļena Ostapenko [9], Daria Kasatkina [10], (United States) Danielle Collins [11], (Ukraine) Marta Kostyuk [18], Victoria Azarenka [19], Anastasia Pavlyuchenkova [20], Anna Kalinskaya [23], (Czech Republic) Linda Nosková [27], (Czech Republic) Kateřina Siniaková [32]
- Schedule of play

Matches on main courts
Matches on Court Philippe Chatrier (Center Court)
Event	Winner	Loser	Score
Women's singles - 2nd round	Aryna Sabalenka [2]	(Japan) Moyuka Uchijima [Q]	6–2, 6–2
Women's singles - 2nd round	(Ukraine) Elina Svitolina [15]	(France) Diane Parry	6–4, 7–6^{(7–3)}
Men's singles - 2nd round	(Serbia) Novak Djokovic [1]	(Spain) Roberto Carballés Baena	6–4, 6–1, 6–2
Men's singles - 2nd round	(Italy) Lorenzo Musetti [30]	(France) Gaël Monfils	7–5, 6–1, 6–4
Matches on Court Suzanne Lenglen (Grandstand)
Event	Winner	Loser	Score
Men's singles - 2nd round	Daniil Medvedev [5]	(Serbia) Miomir Kecmanović	6–1, 5–0, retired
Women's singles - 2nd round	(Kazakhstan) Elena Rybakina [4]	(Netherlands) Arantxa Rus	6–3, 6–4
Men's singles - 2nd round	(Germany) Alexander Zverev [4]	(Belgium) David Goffin	7–6^{(7–4)}, 6–2, 6–2
Women's singles - 2nd round	(United States) Madison Keys [14]	(Egypt) Mayar Sherif	6–0, 7–6^{(9–7)}
Men's singles - 2nd round (Note: This match was scheduled to play on Court Simonne Mathieu, but was moved to Court Suzanne Lenglen after the conclusion of the Keys-Sherif match due to rain causing match overruns.)	(Norway) Casper Ruud [7]	(Spain) Alejandro Davidovich Fokina	7–6^{(7–5)}, 1–6, 6–3, 4–6, 6–3
Matches on Court Simonne Mathieu
Event	Winner	Loser	Score
Men's singles - 2nd round	(Poland) Hubert Hurkacz [8]	(United States) Brandon Nakashima	6–7^{(2–7)}, 6–1, 6–3, 7–6^{(7–5)}
Men's singles - 2nd round	(France) Corentin Moutet	(Kazakhstan) Alexander Shevchenko	6–4, 6–2, 0–6, 6–3
Women's singles - 2nd round	(France) Varvara Gracheva	(United States) Bernarda Pera	6–1, 6–3
Coloured background indicates a night match
Day matches began at 11 am (12 pm on Court Philippe Chatrier), whilst night match began at 8:15 pm CEST

== Day 6 (31 May) ==
- Seeds out:
  - Men's singles: Andrey Rublev [6], (United States) Sebastian Korda [27]
  - Women's singles: Liudmila Samsonova [17], (Ukraine) Dayana Yastremska [30], (Canada) Leylah Fernandez [31]
  - Men's doubles: (Mexico) Santiago González / (France) Édouard Roger-Vasselin [5], (France) Sadio Doumbia / (France) Fabien Reboul [16]
- Schedule of play

Matches on main courts
Matches on Court Philippe Chatrier (Center Court)
Event	Winner	Loser	Score
Women's singles - 3rd round	(United States) Coco Gauff [3]	(Ukraine) Dayana Yastremska [30]	6–2, 6–4
Men's singles - 3rd round	(Italy) Jannik Sinner [2]	Pavel Kotov	6–4, 6–4, 6–4
Women's singles - 3rd round	(Poland) Iga Świątek [1]	(Czech Republic) Marie Bouzková	6–4, 6–2
Men's singles - 3rd round	(Spain) Carlos Alcaraz [3]	(United States) Sebastian Korda [27]	6–4, 7–6^{(7–5)}, 6–3
Matches on Court Suzanne Lenglen (Grandstand)
Event	Winner	Loser	Score
Women's singles - 3rd round	(Italy) Elisabetta Cocciaretto	Liudmila Samsonova [17]	7–6^{(7–4)}, 6–2
Men's singles - 3rd round	(Italy) Matteo Arnaldi	Andrey Rublev [6]	7–6^{(8–6)}, 6–2, 6–4
Women's singles - 3rd round	(Tunisia) Ons Jabeur [8]	(Canada) Leylah Fernandez [31]	6–4, 7–6^{(7–5)}
Men's singles - 3rd round	(Greece) Stefanos Tsitsipas [9]	(China) Zhang Zhizhen	6–3, 6–3, 6–1
Men's singles - 3rd round (Note: This match was scheduled to play on Court Simonne Mathieu, but was moved to Court Suzanne Lenglen after the conclusion of the Zhang-Tsitsipas match due to rain causing match overruns.)	(France) Corentin Moutet	(Austria) Sebastian Ofner	3–6, 6–4, 6–4, 6–1
Matches on Court Simonne Mathieu
Event	Winner	Loser	Score
Women's singles - 3rd round	(Serbia) Olga Danilović [Q]	(Croatia) Donna Vekić	0–6, 7–5, 7–6^{(10–8)}
Women's singles - 3rd round	(Czech Republic) Markéta Vondroušová [5]	(France) Chloé Paquet [WC]	6–1, 6–3
Men's singles - 3rd round	(Poland) Hubert Hurkacz [8] vs (Canada) Denis Shapovalov [PR]		6–3, 7–6^{(7–0)}, 2–1, suspended
Coloured background indicates a night match
Day matches began at 11 am (12 pm on Court Philippe Chatrier), whilst night match began at 8:15 pm CEST

== Day 7 (1 June) ==
- Seeds out:
  - Men's singles: (United States) Tommy Paul [14], (United States) Ben Shelton [15], (Netherlands) Tallon Griekspoor [26], (Argentina) Tomás Martín Etcheverry [28], (Italy) Lorenzo Musetti [30]
  - Women's singles: (China) Zheng Qinwen [7], (United States) Madison Keys [14], (Belgium) Elise Mertens [25]
- Schedule of play

Matches on main courts
Matches on Court Philippe Chatrier (Center Court)
Event	Winner	Loser	Score
Women's singles - 3rd round	(Kazakhstan) Elena Rybakina [4]	(Belgium) Elise Mertens [25]	6–4, 6–2
Women's singles - 3rd round	Aryna Sabalenka [2]	(Spain) Paula Badosa	7–5, 6–1
Men's singles - 3rd round	(Germany) Alexander Zverev [4]	(Netherlands) Tallon Griekspoor [26]	3–6, 6–4, 6–2, 4–6, 7–6^{(10–3)}
Men's singles - 3rd round (Note: This match was scheduled to play on Court 7, but was moved to Court Philippe Chatrier after the conclusion of the Zverev-Griekspoor match due to rain causing match overruns.)	(Bulgaria) Grigor Dimitrov [10]	(Belgium) Zizou Bergs [Q]	6–3, 7–6^{(7–4)}, 4–6, 6–4
Men's singles - 3rd round	(Serbia) Novak Djokovic [1]	(Italy) Lorenzo Musetti [30]	7–5, 6–7^{(6–8)}, 2–6, 6–3, 6–0
Matches on Court Suzanne Lenglen (Grandstand)
Event	Winner	Loser	Score
Women's singles - 3rd round	(France) Varvara Gracheva	(Romania) Irina-Camelia Begu [PR]	7–5, 6–3
Men's singles - 3rd round (Note: This match was moved to Court Suzanne Lenglen after the conclusion of the Gracheva-Begu match due to rain causing match overruns.)	(Canada) Félix Auger-Aliassime [21]	(United States) Ben Shelton [15]	6–4, 6–2, 6–1
Men's singles - 3rd round	Daniil Medvedev [5]	(Czech Republic) Tomáš Macháč	7–6^{(7–4)}, 7–5, 1–6, 6–4
Men's singles - 3rd round (Note: This match was scheduled to play on Court Simonne Mathieu, but was moved to Court Suzanne Lenglen after the conclusion of the Macháč-Medvedev match due to rain causing match overruns.)	(Poland) Hubert Hurkacz [8]	(Canada) Denis Shapovalov [PR]	6–3, 7–6^{(7–0)}, 4–6, 6–1
Women's singles - 3rd round	(United States) Emma Navarro [22]	(United States) Madison Keys [14]	7–6^{(7–5)}, 7–6^{(7–3)}
Men's singles - 3rd round	(Norway) Casper Ruud [7]	(Argentina) Tomás Martín Etcheverry [28]	6–4, 1–6, 6–2, 6–2
Matches on Court Simonne Mathieu
Event	Winner	Loser	Score
Women's singles - 3rd round	Elina Avanesyan	(China) Zheng Qinwen [7]	3–6, 6–3, 7–6^{(10–6)}
Men's singles - 3rd round	(Denmark) Holger Rune [13]	(Slovakia) Jozef Kovalík [LL]	7–5, 6–1, 7–6^{(7–2)}
Coloured background indicates a night match
Day matches began at 11 am (12 pm on Court Philippe Chatrier), whilst night match began at 8:15 pm CEST

== Day 8 (2 June) ==
- Seeds out:
  - Men's singles: (Poland) Hubert Hurkacz [8], (Canada) Félix Auger-Aliassime [21]
  - Men's doubles: (Netherlands) Wesley Koolhof / (Croatia) Nikola Mektić [7], (Germany) Andreas Mies / (United Kingdom) Neal Skupski [12], (United Kingdom) Jamie Murray / (New Zealand) Michael Venus [13], (United States) Nathaniel Lammons / (United States) Jackson Withrow [14]
  - Women's doubles: (Chinese Taipei) Hsieh Su-wei / (Belgium) Elise Mertens [1], (United States) Sofia Kenin / (United States) Bethanie Mattek-Sands [14], (United States) Asia Muhammad / (Indonesia) Aldila Sutjiadi [15]
  - Mixed doubles: Vera Zvonareva / (Belgium) Sander Gillé [5], (United States) Bethanie Mattek-Sands / (United States) Austin Krajicek [8]
- Schedule of play

Matches on main courts
Matches on Court Philippe Chatrier (Center Court)
Event	Winner	Loser	Score
Women's singles - 4th round	(Poland) Iga Świątek [1]	Anastasia Potapova	6–0, 6–0
Women's singles - 4th round	(United States) Coco Gauff [3]	(Italy) Elisabetta Cocciaretto	6–1, 6–2
Men's singles - 4th round	(Spain) Carlos Alcaraz [3]	(Canada) Félix Auger-Aliassime [21]	6–3, 6–3, 6–1
Mixed doubles - 1st round (Note: This match was moved to Court Philippe Chatrier after the conclusion of the Auger-Aliassime vs. Alcaraz match.)	(China) Zhang Shuai [PR] (El Salvador) Marcelo Arévalo [PR]	(United States) Bethanie Mattek-Sands [8] (United States) Austin Krajicek [8]	6–4, 6–7^{(6–8)}, [10–6]
Men's singles - 4th round	(Italy) Jannik Sinner [2]	(France) Corentin Moutet	3–6, 6–3, 6–2, 6–1
Matches on Court Suzanne Lenglen (Grandstand)
Event	Winner	Loser	Score
Women's singles - 4th round	(Czech Republic) Markéta Vondroušová [5]	(Serbia) Olga Danilović [Q]	6–4, 6–2
Men's singles - 4th round	(Greece) Stefanos Tsitsipas [9]	(Italy) Matteo Arnaldi	3–6, 7–6^{(7–4)}, 6–2, 6–2
Women's singles - 4th round	(Tunisia) Ons Jabeur [8]	(Denmark) Clara Tauson	6–4, 6–4
Men's singles - 4th round	(Bulgaria) Grigor Dimitrov [10]	(Poland) Hubert Hurkacz [8]	7–6^{(7–5)}, 6–4, 7–6^{(7–3)}
Matches on Court Simonne Mathieu
Event	Winner	Loser	Score
Men's doubles - 2nd round	(France) Grégoire Barrère [WC] (France) Lucas Pouille [WC]	(United Kingdom) Jamie Murray [13] (New Zealand) Michael Venus [13]	6–4, 7–6^{(8–6)}
Women's doubles - 1st round	(Czech Republic) Marie Bouzková [7] (Spain) Sara Sorribes Tormo [7]	(Argentina) María Lourdes Carlé (France) Diane Parry	6–4, 6–2
Mixed doubles - 1st round	(United States) Asia Muhammad (Uruguay) Ariel Behar	(France) Chloé Paquet [WC] (France) Grégoire Barrère [WC]	6–3, 3–6, [10–3]
Mixed doubles - 1st round	(New Zealand) Erin Routliffe [6] (New Zealand) Michael Venus [6]	(Chinese Taipei) Chan Hao-ching (Monaco) Hugo Nys	6–4, 6–3
Mixed doubles - 1st round	(Germany) Laura Siegemund [2] (France) Édouard Roger-Vasselin [2]	(France) Alizé Cornet [WC] (France) Nicolas Mahut [WC]	6–1, 6–3
Coloured background indicates a night match
Day matches began at 11 am, whilst night match began at 8:15 pm CEST

== Day 9 (3 June) ==
- Seeds out:
  - Men's singles: Daniil Medvedev [5], (United States) Taylor Fritz [12], (Denmark) Holger Rune [13], (Argentina) Francisco Cerúndolo [23]
  - Women's singles: (Ukraine) Elina Svitolina [15], (United States) Emma Navarro [22]
  - Men's doubles: (Croatia) Ivan Dodig / (United States) Austin Krajicek [4], (Germany) Kevin Krawietz / (Germany) Tim Pütz [6], (Monaco) Hugo Nys / (Poland) Jan Zieliński [15]
  - Women's doubles: (Czech Republic) Barbora Krejčíková / (Germany) Laura Siegemund [4], (Ukraine) Lyudmyla Kichenok / (Latvia) Jeļena Ostapenko [6], (Czech Republic) Marie Bouzková / (Spain) Sara Sorribes Tormo [7]
- Schedule of play

Matches on main courts
Matches on Court Philippe Chatrier (Center Court)
Event	Winner	Loser	Score
Women's singles - 4th round	(Kazakhstan) Elena Rybakina [4]	(Ukraine) Elina Svitolina [15]	6–4, 6–3
Women's singles - 4th round	Aryna Sabalenka [2]	(United States) Emma Navarro [22]	6–2, 6–3
Men's singles - 4th round	(Serbia) Novak Djokovic [1]	(Argentina) Francisco Cerúndolo [23]	6–1, 5–7, 3–6, 7–5, 6–3
Men's singles - 4th round	(Germany) Alexander Zverev [4]	(Denmark) Holger Rune [13]	4–6, 6–1, 5–7, 7–6^{(7–2)}, 6–2
Matches on Court Suzanne Lenglen (Grandstand)
Event	Winner	Loser	Score
Women's singles - 4th round	(Italy) Jasmine Paolini [12]	Elina Avanesyan	4–6, 6–0, 6–1
Men's singles - 4th round	(Australia) Alex de Minaur [11]	Daniil Medvedev [5]	4–6, 6–2, 6–1, 6–3
Women's singles - 4th round	Mirra Andreeva	(France) Varvara Gracheva	7–5, 6–2
Men's singles - 4th round	(Norway) Casper Ruud [7]	(United States) Taylor Fritz [12]	7–6^{(8–6)}, 3–6, 6–4, 6–2
Matches on Court Simonne Mathieu
Event	Winner	Loser	Score
Men's doubles - 3rd round	(United States) Rajeev Ram [3] (United Kingdom) Joe Salisbury [3]	(France) Grégoire Barrère [WC] (France) Lucas Pouille [WC]	6–3, 6–3
Women's doubles - 2nd round	(United States) Coco Gauff [3] (Czech Republic) Kateřina Siniaková [3]	(Czech Republic) Miriam Kolodziejová [Alt] (Czech Republic) Anna Sisková [Alt]	6–1, 6–2
Women's doubles - 2nd round	Amina Anshba [Alt] (Czech Republic) Anastasia Dețiuc [Alt]	(Ukraine) Lyudmyla Kichenok [6] (Latvia) Jeļena Ostapenko [6]	3–6, 7–6^{(7–5)}, 6–2
Mixed doubles - 2nd round	(United States) Desirae Krawczyk [4] (United Kingdom) Neal Skupski [4]	(United Kingdom) Heather Watson (United Kingdom) Joe Salisbury	6–1, 5–7, [10–7]
Mixed doubles - 2nd round	(Norway) Ulrikke Eikeri (Argentina) Máximo González	(Czech Republic) Barbora Krejčíková (Belgium) Joran Vliegen	walkover
Coloured background indicates a night match
Day matches began at 11 am, whilst night match began at 8:15 pm CEST

== Day 10 (4 June) ==
- Seeds out:
  - Men's singles: (Serbia) Novak Djokovic [1], (Greece) Stefanos Tsitsipas [9], (Bulgaria) Grigor Dimitrov [10]
  - Women's singles: (Czech Republic) Markéta Vondroušová [5], (Tunisia) Ons Jabeur [8]
  - Men's doubles: (Argentina) Máximo González [8] / (Argentina) Andrés Molteni [8]
  - Women's doubles: (United States) Nicole Melichar-Martinez / (Australia) Ellen Perez [2], (Canada) Leylah Fernandez / (New Zealand) Erin Routliffe [9], (Japan) Ena Shibahara / (China) Wang Xinyu [10], (Chinese Taipei) Chan Hao-ching / Veronika Kudermetova [12], (Norway) Ulrikke Eikeri / (Estonia) Ingrid Neel [13]
  - Mixed doubles: (Australia) Ellen Perez / (Australia) Matthew Ebden [1]
- Schedule of play

Matches on main courts
Matches on Court Philippe Chatrier (Center Court)
Event	Winner	Loser	Score
Women's singles - Quarterfinals	(United States) Coco Gauff [3]	(Tunisia) Ons Jabeur [8]	4–6, 6–2, 6–3
Women's singles - Quarterfinals	(Poland) Iga Świątek [1]	(Czech Republic) Markéta Vondroušová [5]	6–0, 6–2
Men's singles - Quarterfinals	(Italy) Jannik Sinner [2]	(Bulgaria) Grigor Dimitrov [10]	6–2, 6–4, 7–6^{(7–3)}
Men's singles - Quarterfinals	(Spain) Carlos Alcaraz [3]	(Greece) Stefanos Tsitsipas [9]	6–3, 7–6^{(7–3)}, 6–4
Matches on Court Suzanne Lenglen (Grandstand)
Event	Winner	Loser	Score
Women's doubles - 3rd round	(United States) Emma Navarro; Diana Shnaider	(Spain) Cristina Bucșa (Romania) Monica Niculescu	3–6, 6–4, 6–4
Men's doubles - 3rd round	(Czech Republic) Tomáš Macháč (China) Zhang Zhizhen	(Argentina) Máximo González [8] (Argentina) Andrés Molteni [8]	6–3, 7–5
Women's doubles - 3rd round	(United States) Coco Gauff [5] (Czech Republic) Kateřina Siniaková [5]	(Japan) Ena Shibahara [10] (China) Wang Xinyu [10]	6–4, 6–4
Mixed doubles - 2nd round	(Germany) Laura Siegemund [2] (France) Édouard Roger-Vasselin [2]	(Japan) Ena Shibahara (United States) Nathaniel Lammons	3–6, 7–5, [10–6]
Matches on Court Simonne Mathieu
Event	Winner	Loser	Score
Women's doubles - 3rd round	(Italy) Sara Errani [11] (Italy) Jasmine Paolini [11]	Amina Anshba [Alt] (Czech Republic) Anastasia Dețiuc [Alt]	6–2, 6–0
Women's doubles - 3rd round	(Japan) Miyu Kato [16] (Ukraine) Nadiia Kichenok [16]	(United States) Nicole Melichar-Martinez [2] (Australia) Ellen Perez [2]	6–3, 6–2
Women's doubles - 3rd round	(Ukraine) Marta Kostyuk (Romania) Elena-Gabriela Ruse	(Canada) Leylah Fernandez [9] (New Zealand) Erin Routliffe [9]	6–1, 6–4
Mixed doubles - Quarterfinals	(Norway) Ulrikke Eikeri (Argentina) Máximo González	(Japan) Miyu Kato (Germany) Tim Pütz	1–6, 7–5, [10–8]
Coloured background indicates a night match
Day matches began at 11 am, whilst night match began at 8:15 pm CEST

== Day 11 (5 June) ==
- Seeds out:
  - Men's singles: (Australia) Alex de Minaur [11]
  - Women's singles: Aryna Sabalenka [2], (Kazakhstan) Elena Rybakina [4]
  - Men's doubles: (United States) Rajeev Ram / (United Kingdom) Joe Salisbury [3], (Belgium) Sander Gillé [10] / (Belgium) Joran Vliegen [10]
  - Women's doubles: (Japan) Miyu Kato / (Ukraine) Nadiia Kichenok [16]
  - Mixed doubles: (New Zealand) Erin Routliffe / (New Zealand) Michael Venus [6], (Chinese Taipei) Hsieh Su-wei / (Poland) Jan Zieliński [7]
- Schedule of play

Matches on main courts
Matches on Court Philippe Chatrier (Center Court)
Event	Winner	Loser	Score
Men's doubles - Quarterfinals	(Spain) Marcel Granollers [1] (Argentina) Horacio Zeballos [1]	(Czech Republic) Tomáš Macháč (China) Zhang Zhizhen	6–4, 6–1
Women's singles - Quarterfinals	(Italy) Jasmine Paolini [12]	(Kazakhstan) Elena Rybakina [4]	6–2, 4–6, 6–4
Women's singles - Quarterfinals	Mirra Andreeva	Aryna Sabalenka [2]	6–7^{(5–7)}, 6–4, 6–4
Men's singles - Quarterfinals	(Germany) Alexander Zverev [4]	(Australia) Alex de Minaur [11]	6–4, 7–6^{(7–5)}, 6–4
Matches on Court Suzanne Lenglen (Grandstand)
Event	Winner	Loser	Score
Mixed Legends	(France) Tatiana Golovin (France) Mansour Bahrami	(Germany) Andrea Petkovic (France) Henri Leconte	6–2, 7–5
Women's Legends	(Italy) Flavia Pennetta (Italy) Francesca Schiavone	(France) Nathalie Dechy (Puerto Rico) Monica Puig	6–2, 6–3
Men's doubles - Quarterfinals	(India) Rohan Bopanna [2] (Australia) Matthew Ebden [2]	(Belgium) Sander Gillé [10] (Belgium) Joran Vliegen [10]	7–6^{(7–3)}, 5–7, 6–1
Men's Legends	(United States) Michael Chang (France) Fabrice Santoro	(France) Arnaud Clement (France) Sébastien Grosjean	6–4, 6–3
Men's doubles - 3rd round	(Greece) Petros Tsitsipas (Greece) Stefanos Tsitsipas	(France) Manuel Guinard [Alt] (France) Grégoire Jacq [Alt]	7–6^{(7–2)}, 6–2
Matches on Court Simonne Mathieu
Event	Winner	Loser	Score
Men's doubles - Quarterfinals	(Italy) Simone Bolelli [11] (Italy) Andrea Vavassori [11]	(United States) Rajeev Ram [3] (United Kingdom) Joe Salisbury [3]	1–6, 6–3, 6–4
Women's doubles - Quarterfinals	(United States) Coco Gauff [5] (Czech Republic) Kateřina Siniaková [5]	(Japan) Miyu Kato [16] (Ukraine) Nadiia Kichenok [16]	6–0, 6–2
Mixed doubles - Semifinals	(United States) Desirae Krawczyk [4] (United Kingdom) Neal Skupski [4]	(Chinese Taipei) Hsieh Su-wei [7] (Poland) Jan Zieliński [7]	6–1, 6–7^{(2–7)}, [10–4]
Women's doubles - Quarterfinals	(Italy) Sara Errani (Italy) Jasmine Paolini	(United States) Emma Navarro; Diana Shnaider	6–3, 6–3
Women's doubles - Quarterfinals	(Ukraine) Marta Kostyuk (Romania) Elena-Gabriela Ruse	Mirra Andreeva; Vera Zvonareva	walkover
Coloured background indicates a night match
Day matches began at 11 am, whilst night match began at 8:15 pm CEST

== Day 12 (6 June) ==
- Seeds out:
  - Women's singles: (United States) Coco Gauff [3]
  - Men's doubles: (India) Rohan Bopanna / (Australia) Matthew Ebden [2]
  - Mixed doubles: (United States) Desirae Krawczyk / (United Kingdom) Neal Skupski [4]
- Schedule of play

Matches on main courts
Matches on Court Philippe Chatrier (Center Court)
Event	Winner	Loser	Score
Mixed doubles - Final	(Germany) Laura Siegemund [2] (France) Édouard Roger-Vasselin [2]	(United States) Desirae Krawczyk [4] (United Kingdom) Neal Skupski [4]	6–4, 7–5
Women's singles - Semifinals	(Poland) Iga Świątek [1]	(United States) Coco Gauff [3]	6–2, 6–4
Women's singles - Semifinals	(Italy) Jasmine Paolini [12]	Mirra Andreeva	6–3, 6–1
Matches on Court Suzanne Lenglen (Grandstand)
Event	Winner	Loser	Score
Women's Legends	(France) Pauline Parmentier (Czech Republic) Lucie Šafářová	(Germany) Andrea Petković (France) Nathalie Tauziat	7–6^{(7–5)}, 7–5
Men's Legends	(United States) John Mcenroe (France) Jo-Wilfried Tsonga	(France) Gilles Simon (Sweden) Mats Wilander	6–2, 6–3
Mixed Legends	(Poland) Agnieszka Radwańska (France) Sébastien Grosjean	(Puerto Rico) Monica Puig (France) Arnaud Clément	6–3, ret.
Matches on Court Simonne Mathieu
Event	Winner	Loser	Score
Men's doubles - Semifinals	(Italy) Simone Bolelli [11] (Italy) Andrea Vavassori [11]	(India) Rohan Bopanna [2] (Australia) Matthew Ebden [2]	7–5, 2–6, 6–2
Men's doubles - Quarterfinals	(El Salvador) Marcelo Arevalo [9] (Croatia) Mate Pavic [9]	(Greece) Petros Tsitsipas (Greece) Stefanos Tsitsipas	7–5, 6–4
Matches began at 11 am (12 pm on Court Philippe Chatrier and Court Simonne Mathieu)

== Day 13 (7 June) ==
- Seeds out:
  - Men's singles: (Italy) Jannik Sinner [2], (Norway) Casper Ruud [7]
  - Men's doubles: (Spain) Marcel Granollers / (Argentina) Horacio Zeballos [1]
  - Women's doubles: (United States) Caroline Dolehide / (United States) Desirae Krawczyk [8]
- Schedule of play

Matches on main courts
Matches on Court Philippe Chatrier (Center Court)
Event	Winner	Loser	Score
Wheelchair men's doubles - Semifinals	(Japan) Takuya Miki [2] (Japan) Tokito Oda [2]	(France) Frédéric Cattaneo (France) Guilhem Laget	6–1, 6–1
Men's singles - Semifinals	(Spain) Carlos Alcaraz [3]	(Italy) Jannik Sinner [2]	2–6, 6–3, 3–6, 6–4, 6–3
Men's singles - Semifinals	(Germany) Alexander Zverev [4]	(Norway) Casper Ruud [7]	2–6, 6–2, 6–4, 6–2
Matches on Court Suzanne Lenglen (Grandstand)
Event	Winner	Loser	Score
Mixed Legends	(Slovakia) Daniela Hantuchová (France) Guy Forget	(Italy) Francesca Schiavone (France) Mansour Bahrami	4–6, 6–3, [10–4]
Men’s Legends	(United States) Michael Chang (France) Gilles Simon	(France) Henri Leconte (United States) John Mcenroe	6–4, 7–5
Matches on Court Simonne Mathieu
Event	Winner	Loser	Score
Women’s Legends	(United States) Lindsay Davenport (Italy) Flavia Pennetta	(France) Nathalie Dechy (France) Pauline Parmentier	6–3, 6–3
Men's doubles - Semifinals	(El Salvador) Marcelo Arévalo [9] (Croatia) Mate Pavić [9]	(Spain) Marcel Granollers [1] (Argentina) Horacio Zeballos [1]	3–6, 6–4, 7–5
Women's doubles - Semifinals	(Italy) Sara Errani [11] (Italy) Jasmine Paolini [11]	(Ukraine) Marta Kostyuk (Romania) Elena-Gabriela Ruse	1–6, 6–4, 6–1
Women's doubles - Semifinals	(United States) Coco Gauff [5] (Czech Republic) Kateřina Siniaková [5]	(United States) Caroline Dolehide [8] (United States) Desirae Krawczyk [8]	5–7, 6–4, 6–2
Matches began at 11 am

== Day 14 (8 June) ==
- Seeds out:
  - Women's singles: (Italy) Jasmine Paolini [12]
  - Men's doubles: (Italy) Simone Bolelli / (Italy) Andrea Vavassori [11]
- Schedule of play

Matches on main courts
Matches on Court Philippe Chatrier (Center Court)
Event	Winner	Loser	Score
Wheelchair Women's singles - Final	(Netherlands) Diede de Groot [1]	(China) Zhu Zhenzhen	4–6, 6–2, 6–3
Women's singles - Final	(Poland) Iga Świątek [1]	(Italy) Jasmine Paolini [12]	6–2, 6–1
Men's doubles - Final	(El Salvador) Marcelo Arévalo [9] (Croatia) Mate Pavić [9]	(Italy) Simone Bolelli [11] (Italy) Andrea Vavassori [11]	7–5, 6–3
Matches on Court Suzanne Lenglen (Grandstand)
Event	Winner	Loser	Score
Mixed Legends	(France) Tatiana Golovin (France) Sebastien Grosjean	(Slovakia) Daniela Hantuchová (France) Cedric Pioline	4–6, 6–2, [12–10]
Women's Legends	(United States) Lindsay Davenport (Poland) Agnieszka Radwanska	(Germany) Andrea Petkovic (Puerto Rico) Monica Puig	6–4, retired
Men's Legends	(France) Jo-Wilfried Tsonga (Sweden) Mats Wilander	(France) Arnaud Clement (France) Guy Forget	6–4, 3–6, [11–9]
Matches on Court Simonne Mathieu
Event	Winner	Loser	Score
Girls' singles - Final	(Czech Republic) Tereza Valentová [12]	(Czech Republic) Laura Samson [3]	6–3, 7–6^{(7–0)}
Boys' singles - Final	(United States) Kaylan Bigun [5]	(Poland) Tomasz Berkieta	4–6, 6–3, 6–3
Girls' doubles - Final	(Slovakia) Renáta Jamrichová [3] (Czech Republic) Tereza Valentová [3]	(United States) Tyra Caterina Grant [4] (United States) Iva Jovic [4]	6–4, 6–4
Boys' doubles - Final	(Norway) Nicolai Budkov Kjær [1] (Austria) Joel Schwärzler [1]	(Italy) Federico Cinà [2] (Japan) Rei Sakamoto [2]	6–4, 7–6^{(7–3)}
Matches began at 11 am

== Day 15 (9 June) ==
- Seeds out:
  - Men's singles: (Germany) Alexander Zverev [4]
  - Women's doubles: (Italy) Sara Errani / (Italy) Jasmine Paolini [11]
- Schedule of play

Matches on main courts
Matches on Court Philippe Chatrier (Center Court)
Event	Winner	Loser	Score
Women's Doubles Final	(United States) Coco Gauff [5] (Czech Republic) Kateřina Siniaková [5]	(Italy) Sara Errani [11] (Italy) Jasmine Paolini [11]	7–6^{(7–5)}, 6–3
Men's Singles Final	(Spain) Carlos Alcaraz [3]	(Germany) Alexander Zverev [4]	6–3, 2–6, 5–7, 6–1, 6–2
Matches on Court Suzanne Lenglen (Grandstand)
Event	Winner	Loser	Score
Men's Legends	(France) Guy Forget (France) Henri Leconte	(France) Mansour Bahrami (France) Cédric Pioline	6–3, 6–7^{(6–8)}, [10–8]
Matches began at 12 pm (11:30am on Court Philippe Chatrier)
