= 2024 French Open – Women's doubles =

Women's doubles
- 2024 French Open

Final
- Champions: (United States) Coco Gauff (Czech Republic) Kateřina Siniaková
- Runners-up: (Italy) Sara Errani (Italy) Jasmine Paolini
- Score: 7–6^{(7–5)}, 6–3

Events
Singles	men	women		boys	girls
Doubles	men	women	mixed	boys	girls
WC Singles	men	women	quad	boys	girls
WC Doubles	men	women	quad	boys	girls
- French Open

Coco Gauff and Kateřina Siniaková defeated Sara Errani and Jasmine Paolini in the final, 7–6^{(7–5)}, 6–3 to win the women's doubles tennis title at the 2024 French Open. It was Gauff's first major women's doubles title and Siniaková's eighth.

Hsieh Su-wei and Wang Xinyu were the defending champions, but chose not to participate together. Hsieh partnered with Elise Mertens, but lost in the second round to Emma Navarro and Diana Shnaider; Mertens was vying to complete a career Grand Slam. Wang partnered with Ena Shibahara, but lost in the third round to Gauff and Siniaková.

Mertens regained the WTA No. 1 doubles ranking from Hsieh at the end of the tournament. Erin Routliffe and Laura Siegemund were also in contention for the top ranking at the beginning of the tournament.

== Seeds ==
1. (Chinese Taipei) Hsieh Su-wei / (Belgium) Elise Mertens (second round)
2. (United States) Nicole Melichar-Martinez / (Australia) Ellen Perez (third round)
3. (Netherlands) Demi Schuurs / (Brazil) Luisa Stefani (withdrew)
4. (Czech Republic) Barbora Krejčíková / (Germany) Laura Siegemund (third round)
5. (United States) Coco Gauff / (Czech Republic) Kateřina Siniaková (champions)
6. (Ukraine) Lyudmyla Kichenok / (Latvia) Jeļena Ostapenko (second round)
7. (Czech Republic) Marie Bouzková / (Spain) Sara Sorribes Tormo (second round)
8. (United States) Caroline Dolehide / (United States) Desirae Krawczyk (semifinals)
9. (Canada) Leylah Fernandez / (New Zealand) Erin Routliffe (third round)
10. (Japan) Ena Shibahara / (China) Wang Xinyu (third round)
11. (Italy) Sara Errani / (Italy) Jasmine Paolini (final)
12. (Chinese Taipei) Chan Hao-ching / Veronika Kudermetova (third round)
13. (Norway) Ulrikke Eikeri / (Estonia) Ingrid Neel (third round)
14. (United States) Sofia Kenin / (United States) Bethanie Mattek-Sands (second round)
15. (United States) Asia Muhammad / (Indonesia) Aldila Sutjiadi (second round)
16. (Japan) Miyu Kato / (Ukraine) Nadiia Kichenok (quarterfinals)

== Draw ==
Key

- Q = Qualifier
- WC = Wild card
- LL = Lucky loser
- Alt = Alternate
- ITF = ITF entry
- PR = Protected ranking
- SR = Special ranking
- SE = Special exempt
- JE = Junior exempt
- JR = Junior Accelerator Programme entrant
- CO = College Accelerator Programme entrant
- NG = Next Gen Accelerator Program entrant
- w/o = Walkover
- r = Retired
- d = Defaulted

=== Finals ===
Quarterfinals
(United States) Emma Navarro; Diana Shnaider	3	3
11	(Italy) Sara Errani (Italy) Jasmine Paolini	6	6
Mirra Andreeva; Vera Zvonareva
(Ukraine) Marta Kostyuk (Romania) Elena-Gabriela Ruse	w/o
8	(United States) Caroline Dolehide (United States) Desirae Krawczyk	7	4	7
(Mexico) Giuliana Olmos; Alexandra Panova	5	6	5
5	(United States) Coco Gauff (Czech Republic) Kateřina Siniaková	6	6
16	(Japan) Miyu Kato (Ukraine) Nadiia Kichenok	0	2

Semifinals
11	(Italy) Sara Errani (Italy) Jasmine Paolini	1	6	6
(Ukraine) Marta Kostyuk (Romania) Elena-Gabriela Ruse	6	4	1
8	(United States) Caroline Dolehide (United States) Desirae Krawczyk	7	4	2
5	(United States) Coco Gauff (Czech Republic) Kateřina Siniaková	5	6	6

Final
11	(Italy) Sara Errani (Italy) Jasmine Paolini	6^{5}	3
5	(United States) Coco Gauff (Czech Republic) Kateřina Siniaková	7^{7}	6

=== Top half ===
==== Section 1 ====
First round
1	(Chinese Taipei) S-w Hsieh (Belgium) E Mertens	6	7^{7}
(Japan) S Aoyama (Serbia) A Krunić	1	6^{3}
(United States) P Stearns (China) S Zhang	4	4
(United States) E Navarro; D Shnaider	6	6
(Spain) C Bucșa (Romania) M Niculescu	6	6
(United States) L Davis (United States) S Santamaria	2	1
(Poland) M Fręch (Bulgaria) V Tomova	2	1^{r}
14	(United States) S Kenin (United States) B Mattek-Sands	6	4
11	(Italy) S Errani (Italy) J Paolini	6	6
(Hungary) T Babos; I Khromacheva	3	1
(Poland) M Linette (United States) B Pera	6	6
(Italy) A Moratelli (Italy) C Rosatello	3	0
Alt	A Anshba (Czech Republic) A Dețiuc	7^{7}	6
(Romania) A Bogdan (Romania) J Cristian	6^{4}	2
(United States) A Krueger (United States) S Stephens	2	2
6	(Ukraine) L Kichenok (Latvia) J Ostapenko	6	6

Second round
1	(Chinese Taipei) S-w Hsieh (Belgium) E Mertens	2	4
(United States) E Navarro; D Shnaider	6	6
(Spain) C Bucșa (Romania) M Niculescu	2	6	7^{11}
14	(United States) S Kenin (United States) B Mattek-Sands	6	4	6^{9}
11	(Italy) S Errani (Italy) J Paolini	6	7^{9}
(Poland) M Linette (United States) B Pera	4	6^{7}
Alt	A Anshba (Czech Republic) A Dețiuc	3	7^{7}	6
6	(Ukraine) L Kichenok (Latvia) J Ostapenko	6	6^{5}	2

Third round
(United States) E Navarro; D Shnaider	3	6	6
(Spain) C Bucșa (Romania) M Niculescu	6	4	4
11	(Italy) S Errani (Italy) J Paolini	6	6
Alt	A Anshba (Czech Republic) A Dețiuc	2	0

Quarterfinals
(United States) E Navarro; D Shnaider	3	3
11	(Italy) S Errani (Italy) J Paolini	6	6

==== Section 2 ====
First round
Alt	(Japan) N Hibino (Poland) K Kawa	6	6
(Romania) I-C Begu (Argentina) N Podoroska	2	2
WC	(France) É Dartron (France) T Rakotomanga Rajanoah	1	4
M Andreeva; V Zvonareva	6	6
WC	(France) A Cornet (France) F Ferro	6^{6}	6	6^{3}
A Blinkova (Netherlands) A Rus	7^{8}	3	7^{10}
(Hungary) A Bondár (Belgium) G Minnen	3	2
13	(Norway) U Eikeri (Estonia) I Neel	6	6
9	(Canada) L Fernandez (New Zealand) E Routliffe	3	6	6
(China) H Guo (China) X Jiang	6	4	3
(Japan) E Hozumi (Japan) M Ninomiya	7^{7}	2	6
(Italy) L Bronzetti (Belgium) K Zimmermann	6^{4}	6	3
(Ukraine) M Kostyuk (Romania) E-G Ruse	6	6
WC	(France) C Burel (France) C Paquet	0	1
(Argentina) ML Carlé (France) D Parry	4	2
7	(Czech Republic) M Bouzková (Spain) S Sorribes Tormo	6	6

Second round
Alt	(Japan) N Hibino (Poland) K Kawa	4	0
M Andreeva; V Zvonareva	6	6
A Blinkova (Netherlands) A Rus	3	6	4
13	(Norway) U Eikeri (Estonia) I Neel	6	1	6
9	(Canada) L Fernandez (New Zealand) E Routliffe	6	6
(Japan) E Hozumi (Japan) M Ninomiya	0	1
(Ukraine) M Kostyuk (Romania) E-G Ruse	6	6
7	(Czech Republic) M Bouzková (Spain) S Sorribes Tormo	3	4

Third round
M Andreeva; V Zvonareva	6	6
13	(Norway) U Eikeri (Estonia) I Neel	3	2
9	(Canada) L Fernandez (New Zealand) E Routliffe	1	4
(Ukraine) M Kostyuk (Romania) E-G Ruse	6	6

Quarterfinals
M Andreeva; V Zvonareva
(Ukraine) M Kostyuk (Romania) E-G Ruse	w/o

=== Bottom half ===
==== Section 3 ====
First round
8	(United States) C Dolehide (United States) D Krawczyk	6	6
WC	(France) V Gracheva (France) E Lechemia	1	1
A Potapova; Y Sizikova	6	6
Alt	(Germany) T Korpatsch; L Marozava	4	2
(Kazakhstan) Y Putintseva; K Rakhimova	3	0
PR	A Kalinskaya; E Vesnina	6	6
(United Kingdom) K Boulter (United Kingdom) H Watson	1	6	5
12	(Chinese Taipei) H-c Chan; V Kudermetova	6	3	7
15	(United States) A Muhammad (Indonesia) A Sutjiadi	6	6
(Ukraine) A Kalinina (Ukraine) D Yastremska	3	1
(Georgia (country)) O Kalashnikova; A Sasnovich	4	3
(Mexico) G Olmos; A Panova	6	6
WC	(France) E Jacquemot (France) H Tan	6^{1}	2
(Slovakia) T Mihalíková (Czech Republic) L Nosková	7^{7}	6
(Poland) K Piter (Slovakia) AK Schmiedlová	4	0
4	(Czech Republic) B Krejčíková (Germany) L Siegemund	6	6

Second round
8	(United States) C Dolehide (United States) D Krawczyk	7^{7}	6
A Potapova; Y Sizikova	6^{3}	1
PR	A Kalinskaya; E Vesnina	1	3
12	(Chinese Taipei) H-c Chan; V Kudermetova	6	6
15	(United States) A Muhammad (Indonesia) A Sutjiadi	6^{4}	4
(Mexico) G Olmos; A Panova	7^{7}	6
(Slovakia) T Mihalíková (Czech Republic) L Nosková	6	2	2
4	(Czech Republic) B Krejčíková (Germany) L Siegemund	3	6	6

Third round
8	(United States) C Dolehide (United States) D Krawczyk	6	7
12	(Chinese Taipei) H-c Chan; V Kudermetova	2	5
(Mexico) G Olmos; A Panova	6	7^{7}
4	(Czech Republic) B Krejčíková (Germany) L Siegemund	3	6^{5}

Quarterfinals
8	(United States) C Dolehide (United States) D Krawczyk	7	4	7
(Mexico) G Olmos; A Panova	5	6	5

==== Section 4 ====
First round
5	(United States) C Gauff (Czech Republic) K Siniaková	6	6
(Kazakhstan) A Danilina (China) Y Xu	3	0
Alt	(Czech Republic) M Kolodziejová (Czech Republic) A Sisková	6	7^{8}
E Alexandrova; A Pavlyuchenkova	4	6^{6}
E Avanesyan (Colombia) C Osorio	6	6
WC	(France) E Cascino (France) C Monnet	3	0
(United States) H Baptiste (United States) A Parks	5	4
10	(Japan) E Shibahara (China) Xin Wang	7	6
16	(Japan) M Kato (Ukraine) N Kichenok	6	6
PR	(Australia) D Saville (Australia) A Tomljanović	2	3
(Chinese Taipei) F-h Wu (China) L Zhu	2	2
(United Kingdom) M Lumsden (China) Y Wang	6	6
WC	(France) L Jeanjean (France) J Ponchet	6^{7}	5
(China) Xiy Wang (China) Y Yuan	7^{9}	7
(Brazil) I Martins (United Kingdom) O Nicholls	7	2	1
2	(United States) N Melichar-Martinez (Australia) E Perez	5	6	6

Second round
5	(United States) C Gauff (Czech Republic) K Siniaková	6	6
Alt	(Czech Republic) M Kolodziejová (Czech Republic) A Sisková	1	2
E Avanesyan (Colombia) C Osorio	6	6^{4}	5
10	(Japan) E Shibahara (China) Xin Wang	3	7^{7}	7
16	(Japan) M Kato (Ukraine) N Kichenok	6	7
(United Kingdom) M Lumsden (China) Y Wang	3	5
(China) Xiy Wang (China) Y Yuan
2	(United States) N Melichar-Martinez (Australia) E Perez	w/o

Third round
5	(United States) C Gauff (Czech Republic) K Siniaková	6	6
10	(Japan) E Shibahara (China) Xin Wang	4	4
16	(Japan) M Kato (Ukraine) N Kichenok	6	6
2	(United States) N Melichar-Martinez (Australia) E Perez	3	2

Quarterfinals
5	(United States) C Gauff (Czech Republic) K Siniaková	6	6
16	(Japan) M Kato (Ukraine) N Kichenok	0	2

== Seeded teams ==
The following are the seeded teams. Seedings are based on WTA rankings as of 20 May 2024.

Country	Player	Country	Player	Rank	Seed
TPE	Hsieh Su-wei	BEL	Elise Mertens	3	1
USA	Nicole Melichar-Martinez	AUS	Ellen Perez	14	2
~~NED~~	~~Demi Schuurs~~	~~BRA~~	~~Luisa Stefani~~	~~23~~	~~3~~
CZE	Barbora Krejčiková	GER	Laura Siegemund	31	4
USA	Coco Gauff	CZE	Kateřina Siniaková	31	5
UKR	Lyudmyla Kichenok	LAT	Jeļena Ostapenko	33	6
CZE	Marie Bouzková	ESP	Sara Sorribes Tormo	36	7
USA	Caroline Dolehide	USA	Desirae Krawczyk	36	8
CAN	Leylah Fernandez	NZL	Erin Routliffe	37	9
JPN	Ena Shibahara	CHN	Wang Xinyu	42	10
ITA	Sara Errani	ITA	Jasmine Paolini	52	11
TPE	Chan Hao-ching		Veronika Kudermetova	62	12
NOR	Ulrikke Eikeri	EST	Ingrid Neel	68	13
USA	Sofia Kenin	USA	Bethanie Mattek-Sands	71	14
USA	Asia Muhammad	INA	Aldila Sutjiadi	74	15
JPN	Miyu Kato	UKR	Nadiia Kichenok	80	16

== Other entry information ==
=== Wildcards ===
- (France) Clara Burel / (France) Chloé Paquet
- (France) Estelle Cascino / (France) Carole Monnet
- (France) Alizé Cornet / (France) Fiona Ferro
- (France) Émeline Dartron / (France) Tiantsoa Rakotomanga Rajaonah
- (France) Varvara Gracheva / (France) Elixane Lechemia
- (France) Elsa Jacquemot / (France) Harmony Tan
- (France) Léolia Jeanjean / (France) Jessika Ponchet

=== Protected ranking ===
- Anna Kalinskaya / Elena Vesnina
- (Australia) Daria Saville / (Australia) Ajla Tomljanović

=== Alternates ===
- Amina Anshba / (Czech Republic) Anastasia Dețiuc
- (Japan) Nao Hibino / (Poland) Katarzyna Kawa
- (Czech Republic) Miriam Kolodziejová / (Czech Republic) Anna Sisková
- (Germany) Tamara Korpatsch / Lidziya Marozava

=== Withdrawals ===
- (Italy) Elisabetta Cocciaretto / (Italy) Martina Trevisan → replaced by Amina Anshba / (Czech Republic) Anastasia Dețiuc
- (France) Océane Dodin / (Germany) Tatjana Maria → replaced by (Czech Republic) Miriam Kolodziejová / (Czech Republic) Anna Sisková
- (France) Caroline Garcia / (France) Kristina Mladenovic → replaced by (Germany) Tamara Korpatsch / Lidziya Marozava
- (Netherlands) Demi Schuurs / (Brazil) Luisa Stefani → replaced by (Japan) Nao Hibino / (Poland) Katarzyna Kawa
- (Czech Republic) Kateřina Siniaková / (United States) Taylor Townsend → replaced by (United States) Coco Gauff / (Czech Republic) Kateřina Siniaková
