= 2024 French Open – Men's singles =

Tennis championship

Men's singles
- 2024 French Open

Final
- Champion: (Spain) Carlos Alcaraz
- Runner-up: (Germany) Alexander Zverev
- Score: 6–3, 2–6, 5–7, 6–1, 6–2

Details
- Draw: 128
- Seeds: 32

Events
Singles	men	women		boys	girls
Doubles	men	women	mixed	boys	girls
WC Singles	men	women	quad	boys	girls
WC Doubles	men	women	quad	boys	girls

Qualification
Singles	men	women
- French Open

Carlos Alcaraz defeated Alexander Zverev in the final, 6–3, 2–6, 5–7, 6–1, 6–2 to win the men's singles tennis title at the 2024 French Open. It was his first French Open title and third major title overall. At 21 years and 21 days old, Alcaraz was the youngest man to win major titles on three different surfaces, having won the 2022 US Open on hardcourts and 2023 Wimbledon Championships on grass. He was the first French Open champion outside of Rafael Nadal or Novak Djokovic since Stan Wawrinka in 2015. Zverev was the first German to contest the final since Michael Stich in 1996.

Djokovic was the defending champion, but withdrew from his quarterfinal match due to a knee injury. His third-round match against Lorenzo Musetti marked the latest finish in tournament history, ending at 3:07 a.m. local time. Grigor Dimitrov completed the career set of quarterfinals at all major tournaments and ATP Masters 1000.

This marked the last major appearance of 14-time French Open champion and 22-time major champion Nadal; he lost to Zverev in the first round, ending his storied career at the French Open with a 112–4 win-loss record. It was the only time in Nadal's career he lost in the first round at the French Open. Nadal was unseeded at a major for the first time since the 2005 Australian Open while using a protected ranking to enter the main draw. This tournament also marked the final major singles appearance of former world No. 1, two-time Olympic gold medalist, 2016 finalist and three-time major champion Andy Murray; he lost to Stan Wawrinka in the first round.

== Seeds ==
1. (Serbia) Novak Djokovic (quarterfinals, withdrew)
2. (Italy) Jannik Sinner (semifinals)
3. (Spain) Carlos Alcaraz (champion)
4. (Germany) Alexander Zverev (final)
5. Daniil Medvedev (fourth round)
6. Andrey Rublev (third round)
7. (Norway) Casper Ruud (semifinals)
8. (Poland) Hubert Hurkacz (fourth round)
9. (Greece) Stefanos Tsitsipas (quarterfinals)
10. (Bulgaria) Grigor Dimitrov (quarterfinals)
11. (Australia) Alex de Minaur (quarterfinals)
12. (United States) Taylor Fritz (fourth round)
13. (Denmark) Holger Rune (fourth round)
14. (United States) Tommy Paul (third round)
15. (United States) Ben Shelton (third round)
16. (Chile) Nicolás Jarry (first round)
17. (France) Ugo Humbert (first round)
18. Karen Khachanov (second round)
19. (Kazakhstan) Alexander Bublik (second round)
20. (Argentina) Sebastián Báez (second round)
21. (Canada) Félix Auger-Aliassime (fourth round)
22. (France) Adrian Mannarino (first round)
23. (Argentina) Francisco Cerúndolo (fourth round)
24. (Chile) Alejandro Tabilo (first round)
25. (United States) Frances Tiafoe (second round)
26. (Netherlands) Tallon Griekspoor (third round)
27. (United States) Sebastian Korda (third round)
28. (Argentina) Tomás Martín Etcheverry (third round)
29. (France) Arthur Fils (first round)
30. (Italy) Lorenzo Musetti (third round)
31. (Argentina) Mariano Navone (second round)
32. (United Kingdom) Cameron Norrie (first round)

Click on the seed number of a player to go to their draw section.

== Draw ==
Key

- Q = Qualifier
- WC = Wild card
- LL = Lucky loser
- Alt = Alternate
- ITF = ITF entry
- PR = Protected ranking
- SR = Special ranking
- SE = Special exempt
- JE = Junior exempt
- JR = Junior Accelerator Programme entrant
- CO = College Accelerator Programme entrant
- NG = Next Gen Accelerator Program entrant
- w/o = Walkover
- r = Retired
- d = Defaulted

=== Finals ===
Quarterfinals
1	(Serbia) Novak Djokovic
7	(Norway) Casper Ruud	w/o
4	(Germany) Alexander Zverev	6	7^{7}	6
11	(Australia) Alex de Minaur	4	6^{5}	4
9	(Greece) Stefanos Tsitsipas	3	6^{3}	4
3	(Spain) Carlos Alcaraz	6	7^{7}	6
10	(Bulgaria) Grigor Dimitrov	2	4	6^{3}
2	(Italy) Jannik Sinner	6	6	7^{7}

Semifinals
7	(Norway) Casper Ruud	6	2	4	2
4	(Germany) Alexander Zverev	2	6	6	6
3	(Spain) Carlos Alcaraz	2	6	3	6	6
2	(Italy) Jannik Sinner	6	3	6	4	3

Final
4	(Germany) Alexander Zverev	3	6	7	1	2
3	(Spain) Carlos Alcaraz	6	2	5	6	6

=== Top half ===
==== Section 1 ====
First round
1	(Serbia) N Djokovic	6	7^{7}	6
WC	(France) P-H Herbert	4	6^{3}	4
(Spain) R Carballés Baena	6	7	4	6
(France) C Lestienne	3	5	6	2
(France) G Monfils	6	3	6	6
(Brazil) T Seyboth Wild	2	6	3	4
(Colombia) DE Galán	3	3	5
30	(Italy) L Musetti	6	6	7
23	(Argentina) F Cerúndolo	6	6	6
(Germany) Y Hanfmann	3	3	4
Q	(Austria) F Misolic	4	4	6	6	6
LL	(Finland) O Virtanen	6	6	3	4	2
(Italy) F Fognini	6	6	7
(Netherlands) B van de Zandschulp	1	1	5
(Argentina) P Cachín	2	3	1
14	(United States) T Paul	6	6	6

Second round
1	(Serbia) N Djokovic	6	6	6
(Spain) R Carballés Baena	4	1	2
(France) G Monfils	5	1	4
30	(Italy) L Musetti	7	6	6
23	(Argentina) F Cerúndolo	6	7^{7}	6
Q	(Austria) F Misolic	2	6^{2}	0
(Italy) F Fognini	1	0	2
14	(United States) T Paul	6	6	6

Third round
1	(Serbia) N Djokovic	7	6^{6}	2	6	6
30	(Italy) L Musetti	5	7^{8}	6	3	0
23	(Argentina) F Cerúndolo	3	6	6	6
14	(United States) T Paul	6	3	3	2

Fourth round
1	(Serbia) N Djokovic	6	5	3	7	6
23	(Argentina) F Cerúndolo	1	7	6	5	3

==== Section 2 ====
First round
12	(United States) T Fritz	2	6	6	6
(Argentina) F Coria	6	1	2	1
(Serbia) D Lajović	4	7	6	6^{6}	6
R Safiullin	6	5	4	7^{8}	4
(Australia) A Popyrin	6	6^{8}	3	7	3
(Australia) T Kokkinakis	4	7^{10}	6	5	6
Q	(Italy) G Zeppieri	4	6	6	6
22	(France) A Mannarino	6	2	1	2
28	(Argentina) TM Etcheverry	3	6	6	6
(France) A Cazaux	6	2	1	4
(France) A Rinderknech	6	6	7
WC	(Australia) A Walton	2	4	5
Q	(Monaco) V Vacherot	6	2	2	6^{2}
(Spain) A Davidovich Fokina	4	6	6	7^{7}
Q	(Brazil) F Meligeni Alves	3	4	3
7	(Norway) C Ruud	6	6	6

Second round
12	(United States) T Fritz	6	3	6	6
(Serbia) D Lajović	3	6	3	4
(Australia) T Kokkinakis	1	4	6	7^{7}	6
Q	(Italy) G Zeppieri	6	6	3	6^{5}	2
28	(Argentina) TM Etcheverry	3	6^{8}	6	5
(France) A Rinderknech	6	7^{10}	1	0^{r}
(Spain) A Davidovich Fokina	6^{5}	6	3	6	3
7	(Norway) C Ruud	7^{7}	1	6	4	6

Third round
12	(United States) T Fritz	6	6	6^{4}	5	6
(Australia) T Kokkinakis	3	2	7^{7}	7	3
28	(Argentina) TM Etcheverry	4	6	2	2
7	(Norway) C Ruud	6	1	6	6

Fourth round
12	(United States) T Fritz	6^{6}	6	4	2
7	(Norway) C Ruud	7^{8}	3	6	6

==== Section 3 ====
First round
4	(Germany) A Zverev	6	7^{7}	6
PR	(Spain) R Nadal	3	6^{5}	3
(Belgium) D Goffin	4	6	6	6^{4}	6
WC	(France) G Mpetshi Perricard	6	4	3	7^{7}	3
(Australia) R Hijikata	3	6^{6}	1
(Italy) L Darderi	6	7^{8}	6
(United States) M McDonald	3	4	6	2
26	(Netherlands) T Griekspoor	6	6	1	6
18	K Khachanov	6	6	7^{7}
(India) S Nagal	2	0	6^{5}
LL	(Slovakia) J Kovalík	7^{7}	6	3	7^{7}
(United States) M Giron	6^{3}	4	6	6^{5}
(Italy) F Cobolli	6	6	6^{2}	6
Q	(Serbia) H Medjedovic	2	3	7^{7}	3
(United Kingdom) D Evans	4	4	4
13	(Denmark) H Rune	6	6	6

Second round
4	(Germany) A Zverev	7^{7}	6	6
(Belgium) D Goffin	6^{4}	2	2
(Italy) L Darderi	6^{2}	3	3
26	(Netherlands) T Griekspoor	7^{7}	6	6
18	K Khachanov	6	6	4	3	4
LL	(Slovakia) J Kovalík	4	4	6	6	6
(Italy) F Cobolli	4	3	6	6	6^{7}
13	(Denmark) H Rune	6	6	3	3	7^{10}

Third round
4	(Germany) A Zverev	3	6	6	4	7^{10}
26	(Netherlands) T Griekspoor	6	4	2	6	6^{3}
LL	(Slovakia) J Kovalík	5	1	6^{2}
13	(Denmark) H Rune	7	6	7^{7}

Fourth round
4	(Germany) A Zverev	4	6	5	7^{7}	6
13	(Denmark) H Rune	6	1	7	6^{2}	2

==== Section 4 ====
First round
11	(Australia) A de Minaur	6	6	6
(United States) A Michelsen	1	0	2
(Spain) J Munar	6	4	6	6
(Spain) R Bautista Agut	1	6	4	1
Q	(Argentina) RA Burruchaga	3	2	1
(Germany) J-L Struff	6	6	6
Q	(France) G Barrère	4	5	3
19	(Kazakhstan) A Bublik	6	7	6
31	(Argentina) M Navone	5	6	6	6
PR	(Spain) P Carreño Busta	7	1	3	0
(Portugal) N Borges	6^{3}	4	3
(Czech Republic) T Macháč	7^{7}	6	6
Q	(Brazil) T Monteiro	2	1	6	5
(Serbia) M Kecmanović	6	6	4	7
(Germany) D Koepfer	3	4	7	3
5	D Medvedev	6	6	5	6

Second round
11	(Australia) A de Minaur	7	6	6
(Spain) J Munar	5	1	4
(Germany) J-L Struff	6	6	6
19	(Kazakhstan) A Bublik	2	2	3
31	(Argentina) M Navone	2	1	6	6	1
(Czech Republic) T Macháč	6	6	3	1	6
(Serbia) M Kecmanović	1	0^{r}
5	D Medvedev	6	5

Third round
11	(Australia) A de Minaur	4	6	6	6
(Germany) J-L Struff	6	4	3	3
(Czech Republic) T Macháč	6^{4}	5	6	4
5	D Medvedev	7^{7}	7	1	6

Fourth round
11	(Australia) A de Minaur	4	6	6	6
5	D Medvedev	6	2	1	3

=== Bottom half ===
==== Section 5 ====
First round
6	A Rublev	6	6^{3}	6	7
(Japan) T Daniel	2	7^{7}	3	5
(Spain) P Martínez	5	6	3	6	6
(Argentina) TA Tirante	7	4	6	4	3
(Italy) L Nardi	4	1	3
WC	(France) A Müller	6	6	6
(Italy) M Arnaldi	6	4	6	6
29	(France) A Fils	3	6	4	2
17	(France) U Humbert	4	6	4	3
(Italy) L Sonego	6	2	6	6
(China) Z Zhang	6	4	6	7
(Australia) A Vukic	4	6	3	5
(Serbia) L Djere	5	4	7^{8}	7	6^{6}
(Germany) D Altmaier	7	6	6^{6}	5	7^{10}
(Hungary) M Fucsovics	6^{7}	4	1
9	(Greece) S Tsitsipas	7^{9}	6	6

Second round
6	A Rublev	6	6	6
(Spain) P Martínez	3	4	3
WC	(France) A Müller	4	1	3
(Italy) M Arnaldi	6	6	6
(Italy) L Sonego	5	6	1	4
(China) Z Zhang	7	3	6	6
(Germany) D Altmaier	3	2	7^{7}	4
9	(Greece) S Tsitsipas	6	6	6^{2}	6

Third round
6	A Rublev	6^{6}	2	4
(Italy) M Arnaldi	7^{8}	6	6
(China) Z Zhang	3	3	1
9	(Greece) S Tsitsipas	6	6	6

Fourth round
(Italy) M Arnaldi	6	6^{4}	2	2
9	(Greece) S Tsitsipas	3	7^{7}	6	6

==== Section 6 ====
First round
15	(United States) B Shelton	3	6	6	6
(France) H Gaston	6	3	4	4
PR	(Japan) K Nishikori	7	7^{7}	3	1	7
Q	(Canada) G Diallo	5	6^{3}	6	6	5
(Australia) M Purcell	2	2	6	6	6^{10}
Q	(Germany) H Squire	6	6	3	4	7^{12}
(Japan) Y Nishioka	2	4	4
21	(Canada) F Auger-Aliassime	6	6	6
27	(United States) S Korda	6	7^{7}	6
WC	(France) H Mayot	2	6^{4}	4
(Finland) E Ruusuvuori	3	4	3
PR	(South Korea) S-w Kwon	6	6	6
(United Kingdom) J Draper	5	4	7^{7}	6	3
Q	(Netherlands) J de Jong	7	6	6^{3}	3	6
LL	(United States) JJ Wolf	1	2	1
3	(Spain) C Alcaraz	6	6	6

Second round
15	(United States) B Shelton	7^{9}	6	0
PR	(Japan) K Nishikori	6^{7}	4	0^{r}
Q	(Germany) H Squire	4	6	3	2
21	(Canada) F Auger-Aliassime	6	4	6	6
27	(United States) S Korda	6	6	1	6
PR	(South Korea) S-w Kwon	4	4	6	3
Q	(Netherlands) J de Jong	3	4	6	2
3	(Spain) C Alcaraz	6	6	2	6

Third round
15	(United States) B Shelton	4	2	1
21	(Canada) F Auger-Aliassime	6	6	6
27	(United States) S Korda	4	6^{5}	3
3	(Spain) C Alcaraz	6	7^{7}	6

Fourth round
21	(Canada) F Auger-Aliassime	3	3	1
3	(Spain) C Alcaraz	6	6	6

==== Section 7 ====
First round
8	(Poland) H Hurkacz	4	6	3	6	6
Q	(Japan) S Mochizuki	6	3	6	0	3
WC	(United States) N Moreno de Alboran	1	7^{8}	3	2
(United States) B Nakashima	6	6^{6}	6	6
(France) L Van Assche	3	4	4
PR	(Canada) D Shapovalov	6	6	6
Q	(Italy) M Bellucci	3	6	7^{8}	4	4
25	(United States) F Tiafoe	6	3	6^{6}	6	6
24	(Chile) A Tabilo	6	6^{5}	2	2
Q	(Belgium) Z Bergs	3	7^{7}	6	6
(Australia) J Thompson	3	2	0
(Germany) M Marterer	6	6	6
(Hungary) F Marozsán	6	6	6
Q	(Kazakhstan) M Kukushkin	2	2	3
(United States) A Kovacevic	4	3	4
10	(Bulgaria) G Dimitrov	6	6	6

Second round
8	(Poland) H Hurkacz	6^{2}	6	6	7^{7}
(United States) B Nakashima	7^{7}	1	3	6^{5}
PR	(Canada) D Shapovalov	6^{4}	6	6	6
25	(United States) F Tiafoe	7^{7}	4	2	4
Q	(Belgium) Z Bergs	3	6	6	6
(Germany) M Marterer	6	3	1	3
(Hungary) F Marozsán	0	3	4
10	(Bulgaria) G Dimitrov	6	6	6

Third round
8	(Poland) H Hurkacz	6	7^{7}	4	6
PR	(Canada) D Shapovalov	3	6^{0}	6	1
Q	(Belgium) Z Bergs	3	6^{4}	6	4
10	(Bulgaria) G Dimitrov	6	7^{7}	4	6

Fourth round
8	(Poland) H Hurkacz	6^{5}	4	6^{3}
10	(Bulgaria) G Dimitrov	7^{7}	6	7^{7}

==== Section 8 ====
First round
16	(Chile) N Jarry	2	1	6	0
(France) C Moutet	6	6	3	6
(Kazakhstan) A Shevchenko	6	4	1	6	6
A Karatsev	4	6	6	1	4
WC	(France) T Atmane	6	6	6^{2}	2	5
(Austria) S Ofner	3	4	7^{7}	6	7
Q	(Brazil) G Heide	6	3	1	6	3
20	(Argentina) S Báez	4	6	6	4	6
32	(United Kingdom) C Norrie	6	3	6	6^{5}	2
P Kotov	4	6	3	7^{7}	6
(Switzerland) S Wawrinka	6	6	6
(United Kingdom) A Murray	4	4	2
WC	(France) R Gasquet	7^{7}	7^{7}	6
(Croatia) B Ćorić	6^{5}	6^{2}	4
(United States) C Eubanks	3	3	4
2	(Italy) J Sinner	6	6	6

Second round
(France) C Moutet	6	6	0	6
(Kazakhstan) A Shevchenko	4	2	6	3
(Austria) S Ofner	3	3	6	7	7^{10}
20	(Argentina) S Báez	6	6	4	5	6^{5}
P Kotov	7^{7}	6	1	7^{7}
(Switzerland) S Wawrinka	6^{5}	4	6	6^{5}
WC	(France) R Gasquet	4	2	4
2	(Italy) J Sinner	6	6	6

Third round
(France) C Moutet	3	6	6	6
(Austria) S Ofner	6	4	4	1
P Kotov	4	4	4
2	(Italy) J Sinner	6	6	6

Fourth round
(France) C Moutet	6	3	2	1
2	(Italy) J Sinner	2	6	6	6

== Seeded players ==
The following are the seeded players. Seedings are based on ATP rankings as of 20 May 2024. Rankings and points before are as of 27 May 2024.

Seed	Rank	Player	Points before	Points defending	Points earned	Points after	Status
1	1	(Serbia) Novak Djokovic	9,960	2,000	400	8,360	Quarterfinals withdrew due to right knee injury
2	2	(Italy) Jannik Sinner	8,770	45	800	9,525	Semifinals lost to (Spain) Carlos Alcaraz [3]
3	3	(Spain) Carlos Alcaraz	7,300	720	2,000	8,580	Champion, defeated (Germany) Alexander Zverev [4]
4	4	(Germany) Alexander Zverev	6,305	720	1,300	6,885	Runner-up, lost to (Spain) Carlos Alcaraz [3]
5	5	Daniil Medvedev	6,295	10	200	6,485	Fourth round lost to (Australia) Alex de Minaur [11]
6	6	Andrey Rublev	4,700	90	100	4,710	Third round lost to (Italy) Matteo Arnaldi
7	7	(Norway) Casper Ruud	4,425	1,200	800	4,025	Semifinals lost to (Germany) Alexander Zverev [4]
8	8	(Poland) Hubert Hurkacz	3,885	90	200	3,995	Fourth round lost to (Bulgaria) Grigor Dimitrov [10]
9	9	(Greece) Stefanos Tsitsipas	3,700	360	400	3,740	Quarterfinals lost to (Spain) Carlos Alcaraz [3]
10	10	(Bulgaria) Grigor Dimitrov	3,555	180	400	3,775	Quarterfinals lost to (Italy) Jannik Sinner [2]
11	11	(Australia) Alex de Minaur	3,490	45	400	3,845	Quarterfinals lost to (Germany) Alexander Zverev [4]
12	12	(United States) Taylor Fritz	2,980	90	200	3,090	Fourth round lost to (Norway) Casper Ruud [7]
13	13	(Denmark) Holger Rune	2,700	360	200	2,540	Fourth round lost to (Germany) Alexander Zverev [4]
14	14	(United States) Tommy Paul	2,655	45	100	2,710	Third round lost to (Argentina) Francisco Cerúndolo [23]
15	15	(United States) Ben Shelton	2,500	10	100	2,590	Third round lost to (Canada) Félix Auger-Aliassime [21]
16	19	(Chile) Nicolás Jarry	2,075	180	10	1,905	First round lost to (France) Corentin Moutet
17	16	(France) Ugo Humbert	2,285	45	10	2,250	First round lost to (Italy) Lorenzo Sonego
18	18	Karen Khachanov	2,090	360	50	1,780	Second round lost to (Slovakia) Jozef Kovalík [LL]
19	17	(Kazakhstan) Alexander Bublik	2,110	10	50	2,150	Second round lost to (Germany) Jan-Lennard Struff
20	20	(Argentina) Sebastián Báez	1,990	10	50	2,030	Second round lost to (Austria) Sebastian Ofner
21	21	(Canada) Félix Auger-Aliassime	1,885	10	200	2,075	Fourth round lost to (Spain) Carlos Alcaraz [3]
22	22	(France) Adrian Mannarino	1,865	10	10	1,865	First round lost to (Italy) Giulio Zeppieri [Q]
23	27	(Argentina) Francisco Cerúndolo	1,590	180	200	1,610	Fourth round lost to (Serbia) Novak Djokovic [1]
24	24	(Chile) Alejandro Tabilo	1,645	16	10	1,639	First round lost to (Belgium) Zizou Bergs [Q]
25	26	(United States) Frances Tiafoe	1,630	90	50	1,590	Second round lost to (Canada) Denis Shapovalov [PR]
26	25	(Netherlands) Tallon Griekspoor	1,635	45	100	1,690	Third round lost to (Germany) Alexander Zverev [4]
27	28	(United States) Sebastian Korda	1,565	45	100	1,620	Third round lost to (Spain) Carlos Alcaraz [3]
28	29	(Argentina) Tomás Martín Etcheverry	1,550	360	100	1,290	Third round lost to (Norway) Casper Ruud [7]
29	38	(France) Arthur Fils	1,145	0	10	1,155	First round lost to (Italy) Matteo Arnaldi
30	30	(Italy) Lorenzo Musetti	1,370	180	100	1,290	Third round lost to (Serbia) Novak Djokovic [1]
31	31	(Argentina) Mariano Navone	1,339	(7)^{†}	50	1,382	Second round lost to (Czech Republic) Tomáš Macháč
32	33	(United Kingdom) Cameron Norrie	1,230	90	10	1,150	First round lost to Pavel Kotov

† The player did not qualify for the main draw in 2023. He is defending points from an ATP Challenger Tour event instead.

=== Withdrawn players ===
The following players would have been seeded, but withdrew before the tournament began.

Rank	Player	Points before	Points dropped	Points after	Withdrawal reason
23	(Czech Republic) Jiří Lehečka	1,685	45+10^{†}	1,630	Lower back injury

† The player will drop 45 points from the 2023 French Open and a net of 10 points from the 2023 Prostějov Challenger (drop of 20 points replaced by his next best result of 10 points)

== Other entry information ==
=== Wildcards ===
- (France) Térence Atmane
- (France) Richard Gasquet
- (France) Pierre-Hugues Herbert
- (France) Harold Mayot
- (United States) Nicolas Moreno de Alboran
- (France) Giovanni Mpetshi Perricard
- (France) Alexandre Müller
- (Australia) Adam Walton

=== Protected ranking ===
- (Spain) Rafael Nadal (9)
- (Spain) Pablo Carreño Busta (18)
- (Canada) Denis Shapovalov (27)
- (Japan) Kei Nishikori (48)
- (South Korea) Kwon Soon-woo (80)

=== Qualifiers ===
- (France) Grégoire Barrère
- (Italy) Mattia Bellucci
- (Belgium) Zizou Bergs
- (Argentina) Román Andrés Burruchaga
- (Netherlands) Jesper de Jong
- (Canada) Gabriel Diallo
- (Brazil) Gustavo Heide
- (Kazakhstan) Mikhail Kukushkin
- (Serbia) Hamad Medjedovic
- (Brazil) Felipe Meligeni Alves
- (Austria) Filip Misolic
- (Japan) Shintaro Mochizuki
- (Brazil) Thiago Monteiro
- (Germany) Henri Squire
- (Monaco) Valentin Vacherot
- (Italy) Giulio Zeppieri

=== Lucky losers ===
- (Slovakia) Jozef Kovalík
- (Finland) Otto Virtanen
- (United States) J. J. Wolf

=== Withdrawals ===
- ‡ (Croatia) Marin Čilić (21 PR) → replaced by (France) Luca Van Assche (99)
- ‡ (Argentina) Facundo Díaz Acosta (53) → replaced by (Belgium) David Goffin (100)
- ‡ (Czech Republic) Jiří Lehečka (29) → replaced by (Germany) Maximilian Marterer (101)
- @ (Italy) Matteo Berrettini (98) → replaced by (Slovakia) Jozef Kovalík (LL)
- § (Czech Republic) Jakub Menšík (74) → replaced by (United States) J. J. Wolf (LL)
- § (Australia) Christopher O'Connell (58) → replaced by (Finland) Otto Virtanen (LL)

‡ – withdrew from entry list before qualifying began
@ – withdrew from entry list after qualifying began
§ – withdrew from main draw

Preceded by 2024 Australian Open – Men's singles	Grand Slam men's singles	Succeeded by 2024 Wimbledon Championships – Men's singles
