= 2024 French Open – Women's singles =

Tennis championship

Women's singles
- 2024 French Open

Final
- Champion: (Poland) Iga Świątek
- Runner-up: (Italy) Jasmine Paolini
- Score: 6–2, 6–1

Details
- Draw: 128 (16 Q / 8 WC)
- Seeds: 32

Events
Singles	men	women		boys	girls
Doubles	men	women	mixed	boys	girls
WC Singles	men	women	quad	boys	girls
WC Doubles	men	women	quad	boys	girls

Qualification
Singles	men	women
- French Open

Two-time defending champion Iga Świątek defeated Jasmine Paolini in the final, 6–2, 6–1 to win the women's singles tennis title at the 2024 French Open. It was her fourth French Open and fifth major title overall. Świątek saved a match point en route to the title, in the second round against Naomi Osaka. She was the third woman in the Open Era to win three consecutive French Open titles (after Monica Seles and Justine Henin). Świątek joined Seles and Margaret Court as only the third woman in the Open Era to win all of their first five major singles finals. The victory completed a calendar sweep for Świątek of the Madrid Open, Italian Open, and French Open clay tournaments, becoming the first player to win all three major clay tournaments in a year since Serena Williams in 2013.

Mirra Andreeva was the youngest player to reach a major semifinal since Martina Hingis at the 1997 US Open. Alizé Cornet made her 69th and last consecutive major main draw appearance, the longest consecutive streak of major appearances by any woman.

== Seeds ==
1. (Poland) Iga Świątek (champion)
2. Aryna Sabalenka (quarterfinals)
3. (United States) Coco Gauff (semifinals)
4. (Kazakhstan) Elena Rybakina (quarterfinals)
5. (Czech Republic) Markéta Vondroušová (quarterfinals)
6. (Greece) Maria Sakkari (first round)
7. (China) Zheng Qinwen (third round)
8. (Tunisia) Ons Jabeur (quarterfinals)
9. (Latvia) Jeļena Ostapenko (second round)
10. Daria Kasatkina (second round)
11. (United States) Danielle Collins (second round)
12. (Italy) Jasmine Paolini (final)
13. (Brazil) Beatriz Haddad Maia (first round)
14. (United States) Madison Keys (third round)
15. (Ukraine) Elina Svitolina (fourth round)
16. Ekaterina Alexandrova (first round)
17. Liudmila Samsonova (third round)
18. (Ukraine) Marta Kostyuk (second round)
19. Victoria Azarenka (second round)
20. Anastasia Pavlyuchenkova (second round)
21. (France) Caroline Garcia (second round)
22. (United States) Emma Navarro (fourth round)
23. Anna Kalinskaya (second round)
24. (Czech Republic) Barbora Krejčíková (first round)
25. (Belgium) Elise Mertens (third round)
26. (United Kingdom) Katie Boulter (first round)
27. (Czech Republic) Linda Nosková (second round)
28. (Romania) Sorana Cîrstea (first round)
29. Veronika Kudermetova (first round)
30. (Ukraine) Dayana Yastremska (third round)
31. (Canada) Leylah Fernandez (third round)
32. (Czech Republic) Kateřina Siniaková (second round)

Click on the seed number of a player to go to their draw section.

== Draw ==
Key

- Q = Qualifier
- WC = Wild card
- LL = Lucky loser
- Alt = Alternate
- ITF = ITF entry
- PR = Protected ranking
- SR = Special ranking
- SE = Special exempt
- JE = Junior exempt
- JR = Junior Accelerator Programme entrant
- CO = College Accelerator Programme entrant
- NG = Next Gen Accelerator Program entrant
- w/o = Walkover
- r = Retired
- d = Defaulted

=== Finals ===
Quarterfinals
1	(Poland) Iga Świątek	6	6
5	(Czech Republic) Markéta Vondroušová	0	2
3	(United States) Coco Gauff	4	6	6
8	(Tunisia) Ons Jabeur	6	2	3
12	(Italy) Jasmine Paolini	6	4	6
4	(Kazakhstan) Elena Rybakina	2	6	4
Mirra Andreeva	6^{5}	6	6
2	Aryna Sabalenka	7^{7}	4	4

Semifinals
1	(Poland) Iga Świątek	6	6
3	(United States) Coco Gauff	2	4
12	(Italy) Jasmine Paolini	6	6
Mirra Andreeva	3	1

Final
1	(Poland) Iga Świątek	6	6
12	(Italy) Jasmine Paolini	2	1

=== Top half ===
==== Section 1 ====
First round
1	(Poland) I Świątek	6	6
Q	(France) L Jeanjean	1	2
(Italy) L Bronzetti	1	6	5
PR	(Japan) N Osaka	6	4	7
(Spain) J Bouzas Maneiro	2	6	5
LL	(Croatia) J Fett	6	3	7
(Czech Republic) M Bouzková	6	6
29	V Kudermetova	2	4
24	(Czech Republic) B Krejčíková	6^{3}	4
(Switzerland) V Golubic	7^{7}	6
A Potapova	6	6
K Rakhimova	2	3
(China) Xin Wang	0	6	6
Q	(Germany) J Niemeier	6	2	4
(Bulgaria) V Tomova	6	7^{7}
16	E Alexandrova	3	6^{5}

Second round
1	(Poland) I Świątek	7^{7}	1	7
PR	(Japan) N Osaka	6^{1}	6	5
LL	(Croatia) J Fett	2	2
(Czech Republic) M Bouzková	6	6
(Switzerland) V Golubic	2	2
A Potapova	6	6
(China) Xin Wang	7	5	6
(Bulgaria) V Tomova	5	7	1

Third round
1	(Poland) I Świątek	6	6
(Czech Republic) M Bouzková	4	2
A Potapova	7	6^{6}	6
(China) Xin Wang	5	7^{8}	4

Fourth round
1	(Poland) I Świątek	6	6
A Potapova	0	0

==== Section 2 ====
First round
11	(United States) D Collins	6	6
(United States) C Dolehide	3	4
Q	(Serbia) O Danilović	6	6
(Italy) M Trevisan	1	2
(Croatia) D Vekić	6
(Ukraine) L Tsurenko	5^{r}
Q	(Brazil) L Pigossi	5	7^{7}	4
18	(Ukraine) M Kostyuk	7	6^{4}	6
32	(Czech Republic) K Siniaková	7	7^{7}
LL	(Hungary) D Gálfi	5	6^{3}
WC	(France) C Paquet	6	6
D Shnaider	3	1
Q	(United States) K Volynets	7^{7}	6
PR	(Serbia) A Krunić	6^{4}	2
(Spain) R Masarova	1	3
5	(Czech Republic) M Vondroušová	6	6

Second round
11	(United States) D Collins	7^{7}	5	4
Q	(Serbia) O Danilović	6^{3}	7	6
(Croatia) D Vekić	7	6
18	(Ukraine) M Kostyuk	5	4
32	(Czech Republic) K Siniaková	6	6^{2}	6^{6}
WC	(France) C Paquet	3	7^{7}	7^{10}
Q	(United States) K Volynets	6	1	4
5	(Czech Republic) M Vondroušová	0	6	6

Third round
Q	(Serbia) O Danilović	0	7	7^{10}
(Croatia) D Vekić	6	5	6^{8}
WC	(France) C Paquet	1	3
5	(Czech Republic) M Vondroušová	6	6

Fourth round
Q	(Serbia) O Danilović	4	2
5	(Czech Republic) M Vondroušová	6	6

==== Section 3 ====
First round
3	(United States) C Gauff	6	6
Q	J Avdeeva	1	1
PR	(Belgium) A Van Uytvanck	2	6	1
Q	(Slovenia) T Zidanšek	6	2	6
(China) Y Wang	6	6
M Timofeeva	3	3
WC	(Australia) A Tomljanović	6	3	3
30	(Ukraine) D Yastremska	3	6	6
17	L Samsonova	6	6
(Poland) M Linette	1	1
Q	(Slovakia) R Šramková	6^{6}	4
PR	(United States) A Anisimova	7^{8}	6
Q	(Ukraine) Y Starodubtseva	4	1
(Spain) C Bucșa	6	6
(Italy) E Cocciaretto	3	6	6
13	(Brazil) B Haddad Maia	6	4	1

Second round
3	(United States) C Gauff	6	6
Q	(Slovenia) T Zidanšek	3	4
(China) Y Wang	2	0
30	(Ukraine) D Yastremska	6	6
17	L Samsonova	6	6
PR	(United States) A Anisimova	2	1
(Spain) C Bucșa	1	4
(Italy) E Cocciaretto	6	6

Third round
3	(United States) C Gauff	6	6
30	(Ukraine) D Yastremska	2	4
17	L Samsonova	6^{4}	2
(Italy) E Cocciaretto	7^{7}	6

Fourth round
3	(United States) C Gauff	6	6
(Italy) E Cocciaretto	1	2

==== Section 4 ====
First round
9	(Latvia) J Ostapenko	6	7
(Romania) J Cristian	4	5
(Germany) T Maria	2	3
(Denmark) C Tauson	6	6
(Germany) L Siegemund	6	2	2
(United States) S Kenin	4	6	6
Q	(Germany) E Lys	6	5	2
21	(France) C Garcia	4	7	6
31	(Canada) L Fernandez	6	6
WC	(France) J Ponchet	2	0
(China) Xiy Wang	7	6^{4}	6
(China) Z Bai	5	7^{7}	3
(Ukraine) A Kalinina	6	6^{2}	1^{r}
(Colombia) C Osorio	3	7^{7}	4
WC	(United States) S Vickery	3	2
8	(Tunisia) O Jabeur	6	6

Second round
9	(Latvia) J Ostapenko	6^{4}	6	3
(Denmark) C Tauson	7^{7}	4	6
(United States) S Kenin	6	6
21	(France) C Garcia	3	3
31	(Canada) L Fernandez	6	6
(China) Xiy Wang	3	4
(Colombia) C Osorio	3	6	3
8	(Tunisia) O Jabeur	6	1	6

Third round
(Denmark) C Tauson	6	7
(United States) S Kenin	2	5
31	(Canada) L Fernandez	4	6^{5}
8	(Tunisia) O Jabeur	6	7^{7}

Fourth round
(Denmark) C Tauson	4	4
8	(Tunisia) O Jabeur	6	6

=== Bottom half ===
==== Section 5 ====
First round
7	(China) Q Zheng	6	6
WC	(France) A Cornet	2	1
(United States) A Krueger	6	4	6^{9}
(Germany) T Korpatsch	4	6	7^{11}
(China) L Zhu	2	4
E Avanesyan	6	6
A Blinkova	6	3	7^{10}
28	(Romania) S Cîrstea	3	6	6^{5}
23	A Kalinskaya	7^{7}	7
(France) C Burel	6^{3}	5
PR	(Canada) B Andreescu	7	6
(Spain) S Sorribes Tormo	5	1
LL	(United States) H Baptiste	4	6	6
(United States) K Day	6	2	2
(Australia) D Saville	3	4
12	(Italy) J Paolini	6	6

Second round
7	(China) Q Zheng	6	6
(Germany) T Korpatsch	2	2
E Avanesyan	6	6
A Blinkova	3	0
23	A Kalinskaya	6	5	3
PR	(Canada) B Andreescu	1	7	6
LL	(United States) H Baptiste	4	6^{6}
12	(Italy) J Paolini	6	7^{8}

Third round
7	(China) Q Zheng	6	3	6^{6}
E Avanesyan	3	6	7^{10}
PR	(Canada) B Andreescu	1	6	0
12	(Italy) J Paolini	6	3	6

Fourth round
E Avanesyan	6	0	1
12	(Italy) J Paolini	4	6	6

==== Section 6 ====
First round
15	(Ukraine) E Svitolina	3	6	6
(Czech Republic) Ka Plíšková	6	4	2
WC	(France) F Ferro	6	3	3
(France) D Parry	3	6	6
WC	(France) E Jacquemot	1	3
(Romania) A Bogdan	6	6
LL	(Hungary) P Udvardy	3	4
20	A Pavlyuchenkova	6	6
25	(Belgium) E Mertens	6	7^{10}
(Argentina) ML Carlé	3	6^{8}
(Croatia) P Martić	6	6
WC	(France) K Mladenovic	4	4
(Netherlands) A Rus	6	6
PR	(Germany) A Kerber	4	3
(Belgium) G Minnen	2	3
4	(Kazakhstan) E Rybakina	6	6

Second round
15	(Ukraine) E Svitolina	6	7^{7}
(France) D Parry	4	6^{3}
(Romania) A Bogdan	6	6
20	A Pavlyuchenkova	4	4
25	(Belgium) E Mertens	6	6
(Croatia) P Martić	4	3
(Netherlands) A Rus	3	4
4	(Kazakhstan) E Rybakina	6	6

Third round
15	(Ukraine) E Svitolina	7	6
(Romania) A Bogdan	5	2
25	(Belgium) E Mertens	4	2
4	(Kazakhstan) E Rybakina	6	6

Fourth round
15	(Ukraine) E Svitolina	4	3
4	(Kazakhstan) E Rybakina	6	6

==== Section 7 ====
First round
6	(Greece) M Sakkari	6	4	3
(France) V Gracheva	3	6	6
(United States) B Pera	6	6
(Japan) N Hibino	2	0
Q	(Argentina) J Riera	2	2
PR	(Romania) I-C Begu	6	6
(United Kingdom) H Dart	6^{3}	4
27	(Czech Republic) L Nosková	7^{7}	6
19	V Azarenka	6	6
(Argentina) N Podoroska	1	0
M Andreeva	6	6
(United States) E Bektas	2	3
Q	(Croatia) L Ćirić Bagarić	3	7^{10}	6^{6}
(United States) P Stearns	6	6^{8}	7^{10}
(Poland) M Fręch	5	1
10	D Kasatkina	7	6

Second round
(France) V Gracheva	6	6
(United States) B Pera	1	3
PR	(Romania) I-C Begu	6	6
27	(Czech Republic) L Nosková	4	2
19	V Azarenka	3	6	5
M Andreeva	6	3	7
(United States) P Stearns	7	6
10	D Kasatkina	5	2

Third round
(France) V Gracheva	7	6
PR	(Romania) I-C Begu	5	3
M Andreeva	6	6
(United States) P Stearns	2	1

Fourth round
(France) V Gracheva	5	2
M Andreeva	7	6

==== Section 8 ====
First round
14	(United States) M Keys	6	6
(Mexico) R Zarazúa	3	2
(China) Y Yuan	1	3
(Egypt) M Sherif	6	6
Q	(Italy) S Errani	6	6
(Slovakia) AK Schmiedlová	3	2
Q	(Turkey) Z Sönmez	2	0
22	(United States) E Navarro	6	6
26	(United Kingdom) K Boulter	6	5	4
(Spain) P Badosa	4	7	6
(Kazakhstan) Y Putintseva	6	6
(United States) S Stephens	1	2
Q	(Spain) I Burillo Escorihuela	1	1
Q	(Japan) M Uchijima	6	6
E Andreeva	1	2
2	A Sabalenka	6	6

Second round
14	(United States) M Keys	6	7^{9}
(Egypt) M Sherif	0	6^{7}
Q	(Italy) S Errani	2	5
22	(United States) E Navarro	6	7
(Spain) P Badosa	4	6	7
(Kazakhstan) Y Putintseva	6	1	5
Q	(Japan) M Uchijima	2	2
2	A Sabalenka	6	6

Third round
14	(United States) M Keys	6^{5}	6^{3}
22	(United States) E Navarro	7^{7}	7^{7}
(Spain) P Badosa	5	1
2	A Sabalenka	7	6

Fourth round
22	(United States) E Navarro	2	3
2	A Sabalenka	6	6

== Championship match statistics ==
Category	(Poland) Świątek	(Italy) Paolini
1st serve %	26/42 (62%)	31/46 (67%)
1st serve points won	18 of 26 = 69%	12 of 31 = 39%
2nd serve points won	11 of 16 = 69%	6 of 15 = 40%
Total service points won	29 of 42 = 69.05%	18 of 46 = 39.13%
Aces	1	1
Double faults	0	2
Winners	18	7
Unforced errors	13	18
Net points won	5 of 11 = 45%	4 of 4 = 100%
Break points converted	5 of 9 = 56%	1 of 1 = 100%
Return points won	28 of 46 = 61%	13 of 42 = 31%
Total points won	57	31

== Seeded players ==
The following are the seeded players. Seedings are based on WTA rankings as of 20 May 2024. Rankings and points before are as of 27 May 2024.

Seed	Rank	Player	Points before	Points defending	Points earned	Points after	Status
1	1	(Poland) Iga Świątek	11,695	2,000	2,000	11,695	Champion, defeated (Italy) Jasmine Paolini [12]
2	2	Aryna Sabalenka	8,138	780	430	7,788	Quarterfinals lost to Mirra Andreeva
3	3	(United States) Coco Gauff	7,638	430	780	7,988	Semifinals lost to (Poland) Iga Świątek [1]
4	4	(Kazakhstan) Elena Rybakina	5,673	130	430	5,973	Quarterfinals lost to (Italy) Jasmine Paolini [12]
5	6	(Czech Republic) Markéta Vondroušová	4,143	70	430	4,503	Quarterfinals lost to (Poland) Iga Świątek [1]
6	7	(Greece) Maria Sakkari	3,980	10	10	3,980	First round lost to (France) Varvara Gracheva
7	8	(China) Zheng Qinwen	3,945	70	130	4,005	Third round lost to Elina Avanesyan
8	9	(Tunisia) Ons Jabeur	3,748	430	430	3,748	Quarterfinals lost to (United States) Coco Gauff [3]
9	11	(Latvia) Jeļena Ostapenko	3,318	70	70	3,318	Second round lost to (Denmark) Clara Tauson
10	13	Daria Kasatkina	3,258	240	70	3,088	Second round lost to (United States) Peyton Stearns
11	10	(United States) Danielle Collins	3,472	10	70	3,532	Second round lost to (Serbia) Olga Danilović [Q]
12	15	(Italy) Jasmine Paolini	2,898	70+95	1,300+35	4,068	Runner-up, lost to (Poland) Iga Świątek [1]
13	14	(Brazil) Beatriz Haddad Maia	2,983	780	10	2,213	First round lost to (Italy) Elisabetta Cocciaretto
14	12	(United States) Madison Keys	3,283	70	130	3,343	Third round lost to (United States) Emma Navarro [22]
15	19	(Ukraine) Elina Svitolina	2,290	430	240	2,100	Fourth round lost to (Kazakhstan) Elena Rybakina [4]
16	18	Ekaterina Alexandrova	2,480	130	10	2,360	First round lost to (Bulgaria) Viktoriya Tomova
17	17	Liudmila Samsonova	2,580	70	130	2,640	Third round lost to (Italy) Elisabetta Cocciaretto
18	20	(Ukraine) Marta Kostyuk	2,180	10	70	2,240	Second round lost to (Croatia) Donna Vekić
19	21	Victoria Azarenka	2,174	10	70	2,234	Second round lost to Mirra Andreeva
20	22	Anastasia Pavlyuchenkova	2,116	430	70	1,756	Second round lost to (Romania) Ana Bogdan
21	23	(France) Caroline Garcia	2,068	70	70	2,068	Second round lost to (United States) Sofia Kenin
22	24	(United States) Emma Navarro	2,068	70	240	2,238	Fourth round lost to Aryna Sabalenka [2]
23	25	Anna Kalinskaya	1,916	0	70	1,986	Second round lost to (Canada) Bianca Andreescu [PR]
24	26	(Czech Republic) Barbora Krejčíková	1,768	10	10	1,768	First round lost to (Switzerland) Viktorija Golubic
25	27	(Belgium) Elise Mertens	1,739	240	130	1,629	Third round lost to (Kazakhstan) Elena Rybakina [4]
26	28	(United Kingdom) Katie Boulter	1,730	20+50	10+1	1,671	First round lost to (Spain) Paula Badosa
27	29	(Czech Republic) Linda Nosková	1,714	70+29	70+25	1,710	Second round lost to (Romania) Irina-Camelia Begu [PR]
28	30	(Romania) Sorana Cîrstea	1,704	10	10	1,704	First round lost to Anna Blinkova
29	31	Veronika Kudermetova	1,623	10	10	1,623	First round lost to (Czech Republic) Marie Bouzková
30	32	(Ukraine) Dayana Yastremska	1,622	40	130	1,712	Third round lost to (United States) Coco Gauff [3]
31	34	(Canada) Leylah Fernandez	1,565	70	130	1,625	Third round lost to (Tunisia) Ons Jabeur [8]
32	33	(Czech Republic) Kateřina Siniaková	1,585	10	70	1,645	Second round lost to (France) Chloé Paquet [WC]

=== Withdrawn players ===
The following players would have been seeded, but withdrew before the tournament began.

Rank	Player	Points before	Points dropped	Points after	Withdrawal reason
5	(United States) Jessica Pegula	4,550	130	4,420	Recovery from injuries
16	(Czech Republic) Karolína Muchová	2,810	1,300	1,510	Right wrist surgery

== Other entry information ==
=== Wildcards ===
- (France) Alizé Cornet
- (France) Fiona Ferro
- (France) Elsa Jacquemot
- (France) Kristina Mladenovic
- (France) Chloé Paquet
- (France) Jessika Ponchet
- (Australia) Ajla Tomljanović
- (United States) Sachia Vickery

=== Protected ranking ===
- (Germany) Angelique Kerber (31)
- (Japan) Naomi Osaka (46)
- (Romania) Irina-Camelia Begu (49)
- (United States) Amanda Anisimova (61)
- (Canada) Bianca Andreescu (64)
- (Belgium) Alison Van Uytvanck (97)
- (Serbia) Aleksandra Krunić (99)

=== Qualifiers ===
- Julia Avdeeva
- (Spain) Irene Burillo Escorihuela
- (Croatia) Lucija Ćirić Bagarić
- (Serbia) Olga Danilović
- (Italy) Sara Errani
- (France) Léolia Jeanjean
- (Germany) Eva Lys
- (Germany) Jule Niemeier
- (Brazil) Laura Pigossi
- (Argentina) Julia Riera
- (Turkey) Zeynep Sönmez
- (Slovakia) Rebecca Šramková
- (Ukraine) Yuliia Starodubtseva
- (Japan) Moyuka Uchijima
- (United States) Katie Volynets
- (Slovenia) Tamara Zidanšek

=== Lucky losers ===
- (United States) Hailey Baptiste
- (Croatia) Jana Fett
- (Hungary) Dalma Gálfi
- (Hungary) Panna Udvardy

=== Withdrawals ===
- † (Czech Republic) Karolína Muchová (12) → replaced by (United Kingdom) Jodie Burrage (98) (Note: Burrage was initially in the entry list when Muchová did not enter the tournament due to injury, Burrage herself later withdrew due to an ankle injury.)
- † (Czech Republic) Petra Kvitová (58) → replaced by (United States) Emina Bektas (99)
- † (Switzerland) Belinda Bencic (91) → replaced by (Serbia) Aleksandra Krunić (99 PR)
- ‡ (Belgium) Yanina Wickmayer (89) → replaced by Erika Andreeva (100)
- ‡ (Austria) Julia Grabher (73 PR) → replaced by (Mexico) Renata Zarazúa (101)
- @ (United Kingdom) Jodie Burrage (98) → replaced by (Croatia) Jana Fett (LL)
- @ (United States) Jessica Pegula (5) → replaced by (Hungary) Dalma Gálfi (LL)
- § (United States) Taylor Townsend (57) → replaced by (Hungary) Panna Udvardy (LL)
- § (France) Océane Dodin (76) → replaced by (United States) Hailey Baptiste (LL)

† – not included on entry list
‡ – withdrew from entry list before qualifying began
@ – withdrew from entry list after qualifying began
§ – withdrew from main draw

== Notes ==
Preceded by 2024 Australian Open – Women's singles	Grand Slam women's singles	Succeeded by 2024 Wimbledon Championships – Women's singles
