= 2026 Wimbledon Championships – Day-by-day summaries =

The 2026 Wimbledon Championships's order of play for main draw matches on the center court and outside courts, starting from 29 June until 12 July.

All dates are BST (UTC+1).

== Day 1 (29 June) ==
- Seeds out:
  - Gentlemen's Singles: (Norway) Casper Ruud [11], Andrey Rublev [12], (Italy) Luciano Darderi [14], (United Kingdom) Cameron Norrie [26]
  - Ladies' Singles: (Poland) Maja Chwalińska [20], (Canada) Leylah Fernandez [22], (Austria) Anastasia Potapova [27], (United States) Ann Li [28]
- Schedule of play

Matches on main courts
Matches on Centre Court
Event	Winner	Loser	Score
Gentlemen's Singles – 1st round	(Italy) Jannik Sinner [1]	(Serbia) Miomir Kecmanović	4–6, 6–3, 6–7^{(6–8)}, 6–2, 6–3
Ladies' Singles – 1st round	Aryna Sabalenka [1]	(Serbia) Teodora Kostović [Q]	6–2, 6–3
Gentlemen's Singles – 1st round	(Serbia) Novak Djokovic [7]	(China) Wu Yibing	6–4, 5–7, 6–4, 6–4
Matches on No. 1 Court
Event	Winner	Loser	Score
Ladies' Singles – 1st round (Note: The match was originally scheduled to play on Court 17, but was moved to No. 1 Court following Emma Raducanu's withdrawal, with the originally scheduled match was moved to Court 17.)	(Latvia) Jeļena Ostapenko	(United Kingdom) Harriet Dart [WC]	6–3, 3–6, 6–4
Gentlemen's Singles – 1st round	Daniil Medvedev [8]	(Croatia) Marin Čilić	6–1, 6–2, 6–4
Ladies' Singles – 1st round	Mirra Andreeva [5]	(Poland) Magda Linette	7–5, 6–4
Matches on No. 2 Court
Event	Winner	Loser	Score
Ladies' Singles – 1st round	(United States) Jessica Pegula [4]	(Czech Republic) Darja Vidmanova	7–5, 6–3
Gentlemen's Singles – 1st round	(United States) Michael Zheng [Q]	(United Kingdom) Cameron Norrie [26]	6–7^{(7–9)}, 6–2, 6–7^{(2–7)}, 6–3, 7–6^{(10–4)}
Gentlemen's Singles – 1st round	(Canada) Félix Auger-Aliassime [3]	(Kazakhstan) Alexander Shevchenko	6–3, 6–1, 6–4
Ladies' Singles – 1st round	(United States) Coco Gauff [7]	(Germany) Tamara Korpatsch	6–2, 6–1
Matches on No. 3 Court
Event	Winner	Loser	Score
Gentlemen's Singles – 1st round	(Spain) Rafael Jódar [23]	(United Kingdom) Felix Gill [WC]	6–3, 6–3, 7–5
Gentlemen's Singles – 1st round	(Poland) Hubert Hurkacz	(Norway) Casper Ruud [11]	6–4, 6–2, 7–6^{(9–7)}
Ladies' Singles – 1st round	(Japan) Naomi Osaka [14]	(France) Elsa Jacquemot	6–1, 7–5
Ladies' Singles – 1st round	(Czech Republic) Barbora Krejčíková	(United Kingdom) Hannah Klugman [WC]	6−1, 6−4
Ladies' Singles – 1st round (Note: The match was originally scheduled to play on Court 17, but was moved to No. 3 Court following the conclusion of Krejčíková-Klugman match due to match overruns.)	(France) Diane Parry	(United Kingdom) Francesca Jones	6−4, 6−4
Matches began at 11 am (1:30 pm on Centre Court and 1:00 pm on No. 1 Court) BST

== Day 2 (30 June) ==
- Seeds out:
  - Gentlemen's Singles: (United States) Ben Shelton [4], (Argentina) Francisco Cerúndolo [18], (France) Ugo Humbert [27], (Argentina) Tomás Martín Etcheverry [29], (Chile) Alejandro Tabilo [30], (Italy) Matteo Arnaldi [32]
  - Ladies' Singles: (Ukraine) Elina Svitolina [8], (Denmark) Clara Tauson [24], (Croatia) Donna Vekić [31]
- Schedule of play

Matches on main courts
Matches on Centre Court
Event	Winner	Loser	Score
Ladies' Singles – 1st round	(Poland) Iga Świątek [3]	(United States) Taylor Townsend	6–1, 2–6, 6–3
Gentlemen's Singles – 1st round (Note: The match was originally scheduled to play on No. 1 Court, but was moved to Centre Court following Jack Draper's withdrawal, with the originally scheduled match was moved to No. 1 Court.)	(Germany) Alexander Zverev [2]	(Belgium) Alexander Blockx	6–4, 6–7^{(8–10)}, 7−6^{(7–5)}, 7−6^{(7–0)}
Ladies' Singles – 1st round	(Australia) Maya Joint	(United States) Serena Williams [WC]	6–3, 6–7^{(3–7)}, 6–3
Matches on No. 1 Court
Event	Winner	Loser	Score
Gentlemen's Singles – 1st round	(United States) Taylor Fritz [6]	(Serbia) Dušan Lajović [LL]	6–3, 6–4, 6–3
Ladies' Singles – 1st round	(Kazakhstan) Elena Rybakina [2]	(France) Loïs Boisson	6–4, 1–6, 6–3
Gentlemen's Singles – 1st round	(Italy) Matteo Berrettini	(Switzerland) Stan Wawrinka [WC]	6–7^{(7–9)}, 7–6^{(18–16)}, 7–6^{(9–7)}, 7–6^{(7–5)}
Matches on No. 2 Court
Event	Winner	Loser	Score
Ladies' Singles – 1st round	(United States) Amanda Anisimova [6]	(North Macedonia) Lina Gjorcheska [Q]	6–3, 6–2
Gentlemen's Singles – 1st round	(Finland) Otto Virtanen [Q]	(United States) Ben Shelton [4]	6–4, 3–6, 6–7^{(8–10)}, 6–2, 7–6^{(11–9)}
Ladies' Singles – 1st round	(Ukraine) Daria Snigur	(Ukraine) Elina Svitolina [8]	7–5, 6–2
Gentlemen's Singles – 1st round	(Argentina) Mariano Navone vs (Italy) Flavio Cobolli [9]		6–1, 6–7^{(5–7)}, 3–6, 0–0, suspended
Matches on No. 3 Court
Event	Winner	Loser	Score
Ladies' Singles – 1st round	(Italy) Tyra Caterina Grant [Q]	(United Kingdom) Katie Boulter	6–4, 6–2
Gentlemen's Singles – 1st round	(Australia) Alex de Minaur [5]	(Argentina) Román Andrés Burruchaga	7–6^{(7–5)}, 6–1, 6–0
Gentlemen's Singles – 1st round	(Czech Republic) Jakub Menšík [15]	(United Kingdom) Toby Samuel [WC]	5–7, 6–3, 6–3, 3–6, 7–6^{(10–7)}
Ladies' Singles – 1st round	(Ukraine) Marta Kostyuk [12]	(Argentina) Nadia Podoroska [PR]	6–1, 6–2
Matches began at 11 am (1:30 pm on Centre Court and 1:00 pm on No. 1 Court) BST

== Day 3 (1 July) ==
- Seeds out:
  - Gentlemen's Singles: (United States) Learner Tien [16], (Peru) Ignacio Buse [31]
  - Ladies' Singles: Mirra Andreeva [5], (Czech Republic) Kateřina Siniaková [32]
  - Gentlemen's Doubles: (Germany) Jakob Schnaitter / (Germany) Mark Wallner [16]
- Schedule of play

Matches on main courts
Matches on Centre Court
Event	Winner	Loser	Score
Gentlemen's Singles – 2nd round	(Italy) Jannik Sinner [1]	(Portugal) Nuno Borges	7–6^{(7–4)}, 7–6^{(7–2)}, 6–4
Ladies' Singles – 2nd round	(Czech Republic) Barbora Krejčíková	Mirra Andreeva [5]	4−6, 7−5, 6−4
Gentlemen's Singles – 2nd round	(Serbia) Novak Djokovic [7]	(Greece) Stefanos Tsitsipas	6−3, 6−4, 6−2
Matches on No. 1 Court
Event	Winner	Loser	Score
Ladies' Singles – 2nd round	Aryna Sabalenka [1]	(United States) McCartney Kessler	6–1, 7–6^{(11–9)}
Ladies' Singles – 2nd round	(United States) Coco Gauff [7]	(Argentina) Solana Sierra	6−3, 3−6, 7–6^{(10–7)}
Gentlemen's Singles – 2nd round	(Canada) Félix Auger-Aliassime [3]	(Croatia) Dino Prižmić	7–6^{(7–2)}, 6−3, 7−5
Matches on No. 2 Court
Event	Winner	Loser	Score
Ladies' Singles – 2nd round	(Japan) Naomi Osaka [14]	Anastasia Gasanova [Q]	6–3, 6–2
Gentlemen's Singles – 1st round	(Italy) Flavio Cobolli [9]	(Argentina) Mariano Navone	1–6, 7–6^{(7–5)}, 6–3, 7–6^{(10–8)}
Gentlemen's Singles – 2nd round	Daniil Medvedev [8]	(Spain) Daniel Mérida	3–6, 6–3, 7–5, 6–2
Ladies' Singles – 2nd round	(United States) Jessica Pegula [4]	(Spain) Sara Sorribes Tormo [PR]	7–6^{(8–6)}, 6–1
Gentlemen's Singles – 2nd round	(Spain) Rafael Jódar [23] vs (Spain) Pablo Carreño Busta		3–6, 6–3, 1–6, 2–1, suspended
Matches on No. 3 Court
Event	Winner	Loser	Score
Gentlemen's Singles – 2nd round	(United States) Tommy Paul [21]	(South Korea) Kwon Soon-woo [Q]	6–3, 7–6^{(7–4)}, 6–2
Ladies' Singles – 2nd round	(Czech Republic) Karolína Muchová [10]	(China) Zhang Shuai	6–3, 6–2
Gentlemen's Singles – 2nd round	(Brazil) João Fonseca [24]	(Netherlands) Jesper de Jong	6–1, 7−5, 6–4
Ladies' Singles – 2nd round	(Switzerland) Belinda Bencic [11]	(China) Wang Xinyu	7−5, 6–0
Matches began at 11 am (1:30 pm on Centre Court and 1:00 pm on No. 1 Court) BST

== Day 4 (2 July) ==
- Seeds out:
  - Gentlemen's Singles: (Czech Republic) Jakub Menšík [15], (France) Arthur Fils [20], (United States) Brandon Nakashima [28]
  - Ladies' Singles: Diana Shnaider [15]
  - Gentlemen's Doubles: (Netherlands) Sander Arends / (Netherlands) David Pel [15]
  - Ladies' Doubles: (Czech Republic) Tereza Mihalíková / (United Kingdom) Olivia Nicholls [12]
- Schedule of play

Matches on main courts
Matches on Centre Court
Event	Winner	Loser	Score
Ladies' Singles – 2nd round	(Poland) Iga Świątek [3]	(Czech Republic) Karolína Plíšková [PR]	6–1, 6–3
Gentlemen's Singles – 2nd round	(Italy) Matteo Berrettini	(France) Arthur Fils [20]	6–4, 7–5, 3–6, 6–3
Ladies' Singles – 2nd round	(Kazakhstan) Elena Rybakina [2]	(United States) Caty McNally	6–1, 6–2
Matches on No. 1 Court
Event	Winner	Loser	Score
Ladies' Singles – 2nd round	(United States) Madison Keys [26]	(United Kingdom) Katie Swan [WC]	6−1, 6−4
Gentlemen's Singles – 2nd round	(Germany) Alexander Zverev [2]	(France) Valentin Royer	6−1, 6−3, 7−6^{(7−3)}
Gentlemen's Singles – 2nd round	(Bulgaria) Grigor Dimitrov [WC]	(Czech Republic) Jakub Menšík [15]	7−6^{(7−5)}, 4–6, 7–5, 6–3
Matches on No. 2 Court
Event	Winner	Loser	Score
Gentlemen's Singles – 2nd round	(United States) Taylor Fritz [6]	(United States) Patrick Kypson	6–2, 6–2, 7–5
Gentlemen's Singles – 2nd round	(Spain) Rafael Jódar [23]	(Spain) Pablo Carreño Busta	3–6, 6–3, 1–6, 6−3, 6−4
Ladies' Singles – 2nd round	(United States) Amanda Anisimova [6]	(United States) Sofia Kenin	6−2, 4−6, 7−6^{(10−3)}
Gentlemen's Singles – 2nd round	(United States) Frances Tiafoe [17]	(United Kingdom) Jan Choinski	4–6, 6–2, 7–5, 6–2
Matches on No. 3 Court
Event	Winner	Loser	Score
Gentlemen's Singles – 2nd round	(Australia) Alex de Minaur [5]	(France) Adrian Mannarino	6–3, 6–2, 6–2
Ladies' Singles – 2nd round	(Philippines) Alexandra Eala [29]	(Australia) Maya Joint	3–6, 6–2, 6–0
Gentlemen's Singles – 2nd round	(Italy) Flavio Cobolli [9]	(Australia) James Duckworth	7−6^{(7−4)}, 3–6, 7−6^{(7−3)}, 6–1
Ladies' Singles – 2nd round	(Czech Republic) Linda Noskova [9]	(Colombia) Camila Osorio	6–3, 4–6, 6–2
Matches began at 11 am (1:30 pm on Centre Court and 1:00 pm on No. 1 Court) BST

== Day 5 (3 July) ==
- Seeds out:
  - Gentlemen's Singles: Daniil Medvedev [8], (United States) Tommy Paul [21], (Spain) Rafael Jódar [23], (Brazil) João Fonseca [24], (France) Arthur Rinderknech [25]
  - Ladies' Singles: Ekaterina Alexandrova [18], Anna Kalinskaya [19]
  - Ladies' Doubles: (United States) Nicole Melichar-Martinez / (New Zealand) Erin Routliffe [5]
  - Mixed Doubles: (United Kingdom) Henry Patten / (United Kingdom) Olivia Nicholls [4]
- Schedule of play

Matches on main courts
Matches on Centre Court
Event	Winner	Loser	Score
Gentlemen's Singles – 3rd round	(Serbia) Novak Djokovic [7]	(France) Arthur Rinderknech [25]	7–5, 6–4, 1–6, 7–6^{(7–4)}
Ladies' Singles – 3rd round	Aryna Sabalenka [1]	(Latvia) Jeļena Ostapenko	6–4, 6–4
Gentlemen's Singles – 3rd round	(Canada) Félix Auger-Aliassime [3]	(United States) Michael Zheng [Q]	7–6^{(7–1)}, 6–2, 6–1
Matches on No. 1 Court
Event	Winner	Loser	Score
Ladies' Singles – 3rd round	(Japan) Naomi Osaka [14]	(Australia) Daria Kasatkina	6−1, 6−3
Gentlemen's Singles – 3rd round	(Italy) Jannik Sinner [1]	(United States) Jenson Brooksby	6–4, 6–3, 6–4
Ladies' Singles – 3rd round	(United States) Coco Gauff [7]	(United States) Claire Liu [Q]	6–3, 6–7^{(5–7)}, 6–2
Matches on No. 2 Court
Event	Winner	Loser	Score
Gentlemen's Singles – 3rd round	Roman Safiullin [Q]	(Brazil) João Fonseca [24]	6–3, 6–3, 6–3
Ladies' Singles – 3rd round	(United States) Jessica Pegula [4]	(Spain) Jéssica Bouzas Maneiro	6–1, 6–3
Gentlemen's Singles – 3rd round	(Poland) Hubert Hurkacz	(United States) Tommy Paul [21]	4–6, 7–6^{(7–5)}, 7–5, 6–2
Matches on No. 3 Court
Event	Winner	Loser	Score
Ladies' Singles – 3rd round	(Switzerland) Belinda Bencic [11]	Anna Kalinskaya [19]	6−4, 4−6, 7−6^{(10−6)}
Gentlemen's Singles – 3rd round	(Germany) Jan-Lennard Struff	Daniil Medvedev [8]	7–6^{(7–4)}, 7–6^{(7–5)}, 7−5
Ladies' Singles – 3rd round	(Czech Republic) Karolína Muchová [10]	(Thailand) Mananchaya Sawangkaew [Q]	6–2, 7–6^{(7–1)}
Matches began at 11 am (1:30 pm on Centre Court and 1:00 pm on No. 1 Court) BST

== Day 6 (4 July) ==
- Seeds out:
  - Gentlemen's Singles: (United States) Frances Tiafoe [17], Karen Khachanov [19]
  - Ladies' Singles: (Kazakhstan) Elena Rybakina [2], (Poland) Iga Świątek [3], (United States) Amanda Anisimova [6], (Romania) Sorana Cîrstea [17], (United States) Emma Navarro [23]
  - Gentlemen's Doubles: (Spain) Marcel Granollers / (Argentina) Horacio Zeballos [2], (Monaco) Hugo Nys / (France) Édouard Roger-Vasselin [9], (France) Théo Arribagé / (France) Albano Olivetti [10], (United States) Robert Cash / (United States) JJ Tracy [12]
  - Ladies' Doubles: (United States) Sofia Kenin / (Latvia) Jeļena Ostapenko [8], (Ukraine) Lyudmyla Kichenok / (United States) Desirae Krawczyk [11]
  - Mixed Doubles: (United Kingdom) Julian Cash / (Netherlands) Demi Schuurs [5]
- Schedule of play

Matches on main courts
Matches on Centre Court
Event	Winner	Loser	Score
Ladies' Singles – 3rd round	(Philippines) Alexandra Eala [29]	(Poland) Iga Świątek [3]	7–6^{(11–9)}, 6–2
Ladies' Singles – 3rd round	(United States) Madison Keys [26]	(United States) Amanda Anisimova [6]	3–6, 6−2, 6−3
Gentlemen's Singles – 3rd round	(Bulgaria) Grigor Dimitrov [WC]	(Italy) Matteo Berrettini	6−3, 6−4, 3−6, 5−7, 6−4
Matches on No. 1 Court
Event	Winner	Loser	Score
Ladies' Singles – 3rd round	(Belgium) Elise Mertens [25]	(Kazakhstan) Elena Rybakina [2]	7–6^{(7–4)}, 6–1
Gentlemen's Singles – 3rd round	(Germany) Alexander Zverev [2]	(United States) Marcos Giron	6−2, 7–6^{(7–4)}, 6–4
Gentlemen's Singles – 3rd round	(Kazakhstan) Alexander Bublik [10]	(United States) Frances Tiafoe [17]	4−6, 7–6^{(7–5)}, 7–6^{(13–11)}, 4−6, 6−3
Matches on No. 2 Court
Event	Winner	Loser	Score
Ladies' Singles – 3rd round	(Ukraine) Marta Kostyuk [12]	(United States) Emma Navarro [23]	6–2, 4–6, 6–1
Gentlemen's Singles – 3rd round	(Italy) Flavio Cobolli [9]	Karen Khachanov [19]	0–6, 7–6^{(7−4)}, 6−7^{(5−7)}, 6–2, 6–2
Gentlemen's Singles – 3rd round	(United States) Taylor Fritz [6]	(Italy) Lorenzo Sonego	4−6, 6−3, 6−4, 7–6^{(7−5)}
Matches on No. 3 Court
Event	Winner	Loser	Score
Gentlemen's Singles – 3rd round	(Australia) Alex de Minaur [5]	(United States) Zachary Svajda	6–2, 5–7, 6–2, 6–4
Ladies' Singles – 3rd round	(Italy) Jasmine Paolini [13]	(Greece) Maria Sakkari	6–1, 6–2
Ladies' Singles – 3rd round	(Czech Republic) Linda Nosková [9]	(Romania) Sorana Cîrstea [17]	2−6, 6−3, 7−6^{(11−9)}
Matches began at 11 am (1:30 pm on Centre Court and 1:00 pm on No. 1 Court) BST

== Day 7 (5 July) ==
- Seeds out:
  - Gentlemen's Singles: (Spain) Alejandro Davidovich Fokina [22]
  - Ladies' Singles: Aryna Sabalenka [1], (Switzerland) Belinda Bencic [11], (United States) Iva Jovic [16]
  - Gentlemen's Doubles: (Portugal) Francisco Cabral / (Austria) Lucas Miedler [11]
  - Ladies' Doubles: (Belgium) Elise Mertens / (China) Zhang Shuai [4], (Norway) Ulrikke Eikeri / (United States) Quinn Gleason [15]
  - Mixed Doubles: (Italy) Andrea Vavassori / (Italy) Sara Errani [1], (United Kingdom) Lloyd Glasspool / (Slovakia) Tereza Mihalíková [7], (United States) JJ Tracy / (Kazakhstan) Anna Danilina [8]
- Schedule of play

Matches on main courts
Matches on Centre Court
Event	Winner	Loser	Score
Gentlemen's Singles – 4th round	(Serbia) Novak Djokovic [7]	Roman Safiullin [Q]	7–6^{(8–6)}, 6–3, 3–6, 6–3
Ladies' Singles – 4th round	(Japan) Naomi Osaka [14]	Aryna Sabalenka [1]	6–2, 7–6^{(7–2)}
Gentlemen's Singles – 4th round	(Italy) Jannik Sinner [1]	(Japan) Shintaro Mochizuki [Q]	6–3, 7–6^{(7–0)}, 6−3
Matches on No. 1 Court
Event	Winner	Loser	Score
Ladies' Singles – 4th round	(United States) Jessica Pegula [4]	(United States) Iva Jovic [16]	4−6, 6−3, 6−1
Gentlemen's Singles – 4th round	(Canada) Félix Auger-Aliassime [3]	(Spain) Alejandro Davidovich Fokina [22]	6–7^{(4–7)}, 7–6^{(8–6)}, 6−3, 6–7^{(2–7)}, 6−1
Ladies' Singles – 4th round	(United States) Coco Gauff [7]	(Switzerland) Belinda Bencic [11]	4–6, 6–3, 6–4
Matches on No. 2 Court
Event	Winner	Loser	Score
Gentlemen's Doubles – 3rd round	(Finland) Harri Heliövaara [1] (United Kingdom) Henry Patten [1]	(Czech Republic) Adam Pavlásek (Czech Republic) Patrik Rikl	5–7, 6–3, 7–6^{(10–6)}
Ladies' Singles – 4th round	(Czech Republic) Karolína Muchová [10]	(Czech Republic) Barbora Krejčíková	7–5, 5–7, 6–3
Gentlemen's Singles – 4th round	(Germany) Jan-Lennard Struff	(Poland) Hubert Hurkacz	3–6, 6–7^{(5–7)}, 7–6^{(7–2)}, 7–5, 4–2, retired
Matches on No. 3 Court
Event	Winner	Loser	Score
Ladies' Doubles – 2nd round	(Chinese Taipei) Hsieh Su-wei (China) Wang Xinyu	(Belgium) Elise Mertens [4] (China) Zhang Shuai [4]	6–3, 4–6, 6–1
Ladies' Doubles – 2nd round	(United States) Asia Muhammad [16] (Hungary) Fanny Stollár [16]	(Ukraine) Yuliia Starodubtseva (United States) Peyton Stearns	6–1, 6–4
Mixed Doubles – 2nd round	(United States) Christian Harrison [3] (China) Zhang Shuai [3]	(United Kingdom) Marcus Willis [WC] (United Kingdom) Heather Watson [WC]	6–2, 7–6^{(7–4)}
Boys' Singles – 1st round	(Australia) Cruz Hewitt	(Spain) Valentín González-Galiño	6−1, 6−2
Matches began at 11 am (1:30 pm on Centre Court and 1:00 pm on No. 1 Court) BST

== Day 8 (6 July) ==
- Seeds out:
  - Gentlemen's Singles: (Australia) Alex de Minaur [5], (Kazakhstan) Alexander Bublik [10]
  - Ladies' Singles: (Czech Republic) Marie Bouzková [21], (United States) Madison Keys [26], (Philippines) Alexandra Eala [29]
  - Gentlemen's Doubles: (Italy) Simone Bolelli / (Italy) Andrea Vavassori [4]
  - Ladies' Doubles: (Kazakhstan) Anna Danilina / (Serbia) Aleksandra Krunić [3], (Germany) Laura Siegemund / Vera Zvonareva [7]
  - Mixed Doubles: (United States) Christian Harrison / (China) Zhang Shuai [5], (United Kingdom) Neal Skupski / (United States) Desirae Krawczyk [6]
- Schedule of play

Matches on main courts
Matches on Centre Court
Event	Winner	Loser	Score
Ladies' Singles – 4th round	(Italy) Jasmine Paolini [13]	(Philippines) Alexandra Eala [29]	6−4, 4−6, 6−3
Gentlemen's Singles – 4th round	(United Kingdom) Arthur Fery [WC]	(Bulgaria) Grigor Dimitrov [WC]	7–5, 3–6, 4–6, 6–4, 7–6^{(10–7)}
Gentlemen's Singles – 4th round	(Czech Republic) Jiří Lehečka [13] vs (Germany) Alexander Zverev [2]		4–6, 5–7, 3–3, suspended
Matches on No. 1 Court
Event	Winner	Loser	Score
Gentlemen's Singles – 4th round	(Italy) Flavio Cobolli [9]	(Australia) Alex de Minaur [5]	7–5, 7–6^{(7–4)}, 6–3
Ladies' Singles – 4th round	(Czech Republic) Linda Nosková [9]	(United States) Madison Keys [26]	6−4, 7–6^{(7–2)}
Gentlemen's Singles – 4th round	(United States) Taylor Fritz [6]	(Kazakhstan) Alexander Bublik [10]	7–6^{(7–1)}, 6−4, 6−4
Matches on No. 2 Court
Event	Winner	Loser	Score
Ladies' Singles – 4th round	(Ukraine) Marta Kostyuk [12]	(United States) Ashlyn Krueger [Q]	6–4, 6–4
Ladies' Singles – 4th round	(Belgium) Elise Mertens [25]	(Czech Republic) Marie Bouzková [21]	6–4, 6–4
Ladies' Doubles – 3rd round	(Australia) Ellen Perez [9] (Netherlands) Demi Schuurs [9]	(Ukraine) Marta Kostyuk (Romania) Elena-Gabriela Ruse	Walkover
Mixed Doubles – Quarterfinals (Note: This was originally scheduled to play on Court 12, but was moved to No. 2 Court due to scheduling changes.)	(Australia) Marc Polmans (Australia) Storm Hunter	(Argentina) Guido Andreozzi (Indonesia) Aldila Sutjiadi	7–6^{(7–5)}, 7–5
Mixed Doubles – Quarterfinals	(United States) Christian Harrison [3] (China) Zhang Shuai [3]	(United Kingdom) Joe Salisbury (Canada) Leylah Fernandez	6−7^{(5−7)}, 6−3, 6−3
Matches on No. 3 Court
Event	Winner	Loser	Score
Ladies' Doubles – 3rd round	(China) Guo Hanyu [10] (France) Kristina Mladenovic [10]	(Czech Republic) Anastasia Dețiuc; Irina Khromacheva	4–6, 7–6^{(7–5)}, 6–3
Gentlemen's Doubles – 3rd round	(Australia) Thanasi Kokkinakis [Alt/PR] (United States) Aleksandar Kovacevic [Alt/PR]	(United States) Christian Harrison [5] (United Kingdom) Neal Skupski [5]	7–6^{(7–4)}, 7–6^{(7–5)}
Gentlemen's Doubles – 3rd round	(United Kingdom) Julian Cash [3] (United Kingdom) Lloyd Glasspool [3]	(Czech Republic) Petr Nouza (Austria) Neil Oberleitner	6−3, 3−6, 7−5
Mixed Doubles – Quarterfinals	(Croatia) Mate Pavić (Hungary) Fanny Stollár	(United Kingdom) Neal Skupski [6] (United States) Desirae Krawczyk [6]	7–6^{(7–2)}, 7–6^{(7–5)}
Matches began at 11 am (1:30 pm on Centre Court and 1:00 pm on No. 1 Court) BST

== Day 9 (7 July) ==
- Seeds out:
  - Gentlemen's Singles: (Canada) Félix Auger-Aliassime [3], (Czech Republic) Jiří Lehečka [13]
  - Ladies' Singles: (United States) Jessica Pegula [4], (Japan) Naomi Osaka [14]
  - Gentlemen's Doubles: (Argentina) Guido Andreozzi / (France) Manuel Guinard [8], (United States) Austin Krajicek / (Croatia) Nikola Mektić [14]
  - Ladies' Doubles: (Australia) Storm Hunter / (United States) Caty McNally [14], (United States) Asia Muhammad / (Hungary) Fanny Stollár [16]
  - Mixed Doubles: (United States) Christian Harrison / (China) Zhang Shuai [3]
- Schedule of play

Matches on main courts
Matches on Centre Court
Event	Winner	Loser	Score
Ladies' Singles – Quarter-finals	(United States) Coco Gauff [7]	(United States) Jessica Pegula [4]	4–6, 6–3, 6–3
Gentlemen's Singles – 4th round	(Germany) Alexander Zverev [2]	(Czech Republic) Jiří Lehečka [13]	6–4, 7–5, 3–6, 7–6^{(8–6)}
Gentlemen's Singles – Quarter-finals	(Serbia) Novak Djokovic [7]	(Canada) Félix Auger-Aliassime [3]	7–6^{(12–10)}, 3–6, 6–3, 6–7^{(4–7)}, 7–6^{(10–4)}
Matches on No. 1 Court
Event	Winner	Loser	Score
Gentlemen's Singles – Quarter-finals	(Italy) Jannik Sinner [1]	(Germany) Jan-Lennard Struff	7–5, 7–6^{(7–4)}, 6–3
Ladies' Singles – Quarter-finals	(Czech Republic) Karolína Muchová [10]	(Japan) Naomi Osaka [14]	7–6^{(7–4)}, 6–4
Ladies' Invitation Doubles Round Robin (Note: This was added to the schedule following the conclusion of regular matches.)	(Slovakia) Dominika Cibulková (Czech Republic) Barbora Strýcová	(Canada) Eugenie Bouchard (Estonia) Anett Kontaveit	2–6, 6–4, [10–6]
Matches on No. 2 Court
Event	Winner	Loser	Score
Gentlemen's Invitation Doubles Round Robin	(Colombia) Juan Sebastián Cabal (Colombia) Robert Farah	(Cyprus) Marcos Baghdatis (Belgium) Xavier Malisse	7–6^{(7–4)}, 6–4
Ladies' Doubles – 3rd round	(Czech Republic) Kateřina Siniaková [1] (United States) Taylor Townsend [1]	(United States) Asia Muhammad [16] (Hungary) Fanny Stollár [16]	6–3, 6–3
Gentlemen's Doubles – Quarterfinals	(Finland) Harri Heliövaara [1] (United Kingdom) Henry Patten [1]	(Argentina) Guido Andreozzi [8] (France) Manuel Guinard [8]	2–6, 6–4, 7–6^{(10–6)}
Mixed Doubles – Semifinals	(El Salvador) Marcelo Arévalo [2] (Latvia) Jeļena Ostapenko [2]	(United States) Christian Harrison [3] (China) Zhang Shuai [3]	6−3, 5−7, 6−4
Matches on No. 3 Court
Event	Winner	Loser	Score
Gentlemen's Wheelchair Singles – 1st round	(Japan) Tokito Oda [1]	(United Kingdom) Gordon Reid	6–3, 6–1
Gentlemen's Wheelchair Singles – 1st round	(United Kingdom) Alfie Hewett [2]	(Netherlands) Tom Egberink	6–1, 6–3
Ladies' Wheelchair Singles – 1st round	(China) Li Xiaohui [3]	(United Kingdom) Lucy Shuker [WC]	6–1, 6–3
Ladies' Wheelchair Singles – 1st round	(Japan) Yui Kamiji [1]	(Netherlands) Jiske Griffioen	6–2, 7–5
Ladies' Invitation Doubles Round Robin	(Germany) Angelique Kerber (Germany) Andrea Petkovic	(Belgium) Kirsten Flipkens (Slovakia) Daniela Hantuchová	7−6^{(9−7)}, 6−2
Matches began at 11 am (1:30 pm on Centre Court and 1:00 pm on No. 1 Court) BST

== Day 10 (8 July) ==
- Seeds out:
  - Gentlemen's Singles: (United States) Taylor Fritz [6], (Italy) Flavio Cobolli [9]
  - Ladies' Singles: (Italy) Jasmine Paolini [13], (Belgium) Elise Mertens [25]
  - Gentlemen's Doubles: (United Kingdom) Julian Cash / (United Kingdom) Lloyd Glasspool [3], (France) Sadio Doumbia / (France) Fabien Reboul [13]
  - Ladies' Doubles: (Australia) Ellen Perez / (Netherlands) Demi Schuurs [9]
- Schedule of play

Matches on main courts
Matches on Centre Court
Event	Winner	Loser	Score
Ladies' Singles – Quarter-finals	(Ukraine) Marta Kostyuk [12]	(Italy) Jasmine Paolini [13]	6−3, 6−2
Gentlemen's Singles – Quarter-finals	(United Kingdom) Arthur Fery [WC]	(Italy) Flavio Cobolli [9]	6–4, 7–6^{(7–4)}, 6–0
Matches on No. 1 Court
Event	Winner	Loser	Score
Ladies' Singles – Quarter-finals	(Czech Republic) Linda Nosková [9]	(Belgium) Elise Mertens [25]	6−3, 7−5
Gentlemen's Singles – Quarter-finals	(Germany) Alexander Zverev [2]	(United States) Taylor Fritz [6]	6–4, 6–4, 6–2
Ladies' Invitation Doubles Round Robin (Note: This was added to the schedule following the conclusion of regular matches.)	(Slovakia) Magdaléna Rybáriková (Czech Republic) Lucie Šafářová	(Germany) Angelique Kerber (Germany) Andrea Petkovic	6–3, 6–4
Matches on No. 2 Court
Event	Winner	Loser	Score
Gentlemen's Invitation Doubles Round Robin	(Italy) Fabio Fognini (Australia) Lleyton Hewitt	(Sweden) Robert Lindstedt (Romania) Horia Tecău	6–3, 7–6^{(7–4)}
Gentlemen's Doubles – Quarter-finals	(El Salvador) Marcelo Arévalo [6] (Croatia) Mate Pavić [6]	(United Kingdom) Julian Cash [3] (United Kingdom) Lloyd Glasspool [3]	6–2, 7–6^{(7–2)}
Ladies' Doubles – Quarter-finals	(Canada) Gabriela Dabrowski (Brazil) Luisa Stefani [2]	(Poland) Katarzyna Piter (Czech Republic) Anna Sisková	6–1, 6–2
Ladies' Invitation Doubles Round Robin	(Canada) Eugenie Bouchard (Estonia) Anett Kontaveit	(United States) Vania King (Kazakhstan) Yaroslava Shvedova	6–2, 6–4
Mixed Invitation Doubles Round Robin	(Germany) Tommy Haas (Switzerland) Martina Hingis	(Netherlands) Richard Krajicek (United Kingdom) Anne Keothavong	6–3, 6–2
Matches on No. 3 Court
Event	Winner	Loser	Score
Gentlemen's Wheelchair Doubles – Quarter-finals	(United Kingdom) Alfie Hewett [1] (United Kingdom) Gordon Reid [1]	(Netherlands) Tom Egberink (Netherlands) Maarten Ter Hofte	6–1, 6–0
Gentlemen's Doubles – Quarter-finals	(Germany) Kevin Krawietz [7] (Germany) Tim Pütz [7]	(France) Sadio Doumbia [13] (France) Fabien Reboul [13]	7–5, 7–6^{(8–6)}
Ladies' Doubles – Quarter-finals	(Japan) Shuko Aoyama [13] (Chinese Taipei) Liang En-shuo [13]	(Australia) Ellen Perez [9] (Netherlands) Demi Schuurs [9]	6–4, 6–4
Mixed Invitation Doubles Round Robin	(Australia) Mark Philippoussis (Zimbabwe) Cara Black	(United Kingdom) Greg Rusedski (United Kingdom) Johanna Konta	6–3, 6–3
Matches began at 11 am (1:30 pm on Centre Court and 1:00 pm on No. 1 Court) BST

== Day 11 (9 July) ==
- Seeds out:
  - Ladies' Singles: (United States) Coco Gauff [7], (Ukraine) Marta Kostyuk [12]
  - Gentlemen's Doubles: (Germany) Kevin Krawietz / (Germany) Tim Pütz [7]
  - Ladies' Doubles: (Czech Republic) Kateřina Siniaková / (United States) Taylor Townsend [1]
- Schedule of play

Matches on main courts
Matches on Centre Court
Event	Winner	Loser	Score
Ladies' Singles – Semi-finals	(Czech Republic) Karolína Muchová [10]	(United States) Coco Gauff [7]	6−2, 1−6, 7–6^{(12–10)}
Ladies' Singles – Semi-finals	(Czech Republic) Linda Nosková [9]	(Ukraine) Marta Kostyuk [12]	6−4, 6−4
Mixed Doubles Final	(El Salvador) Marcelo Arévalo [2] (Latvia) Jeļena Ostapenko [2]	(Australia) Marc Polmans (Australia) Storm Hunter	4–6, 7–5, 6–2
Matches on No. 1 Court
Event	Winner	Loser	Score
Gentlemen's Doubles – Semi-finals	(El Salvador) Marcelo Arévalo [6] (Croatia) Mate Pavić [6]	(Germany) Kevin Krawietz [7] (Germany) Tim Pütz [7]	7−6^{(10−8)}, 6−2
Gentlemen's Doubles – Semi-finals	(Finland) Harri Heliövaara [1] (United Kingdom) Henry Patten [1]	(Australia) Thanasi Kokkinakis [Alt/PR] (United States) Aleksandar Kovacevic [Alt/PR]	7−6^{(7−2)}, 7−6^{(10−8)}
Gentlemen's Wheelchair Doubles – Semi-finals (Note: This was added to the schedule following the conclusion of regular matches.)	(United Kingdom) Alfie Hewett (United Kingdom) Gordon Reid	(France) Stéphane Houdet (China) Ji Zhenxu	6–4, 6–3
Matches on No. 2 Court
Event	Winner	Loser	Score
Ladies' Doubles – Quarter-finals	(China) Guo Hanyu [10] (France) Kristina Mladenovic [10]	(Czech Republic) Kateřina Siniaková [1] (United States) Taylor Townsend [1]	7–6^{(10–8)}, 7–5
Ladies' Doubles – Quarter-finals	(China) Jiang Xinyu (China) Xu Yifan	(Estonia) Ingrid Neel [PR] (Mexico) Giuliana Olmos [PR]	6–1, 2–6, 6–4
Gentlemen's Invitation Doubles Round Robin	(United Kingdom) Jamie Murray (Brazil) Bruno Soares	(Colombia) Juan Sebastián Cabal (Colombia) Robert Farah	7−5, 7−5
Mixed Invitation Doubles Round Robin	(Iran) Mansour Bahrami (Croatia) Iva Majoli	(United Kingdom) Greg Rusedski (United Kingdom) Johanna Konta	6–4, 6–4
Ladies' Invitation Doubles Round Robin	(Belgium) Kirsten Flipkens (Slovakia) Daniela Hantuchová	(Poland) Agnieszka Radwańska (Denmark) Caroline Wozniacki	7–6^{(7–5)}, 6–3
Matches on No. 3 Court
Event	Winner	Loser	Score
Gentlemen's Wheelchair Singles – Quarter-finals	(United Kingdom) Alfie Hewett [2]	(China) Ji Zhenxu	6–4, 6–1
Ladies' Wheelchair Singles – Quarter-finals	(Netherlands) Diede de Groot [2]	(Netherlands) Aniek van Koot	6–4, 7–6^{(14−12)}
Mixed Invitation Doubles Round Robin	(France) Fabrice Santoro (Australia) Rennae Stubbs	(Netherlands) Richard Krajicek (United Kingdom) Anne Keothavong	6–1, 4–6, [10–4]
Gentlemen's Invitation Doubles Round Robin	(United States) Bob Bryan (United States) Mike Bryan	(Sweden) Robert Lindstedt (Romania) Horia Tecău	6–3, 6–3
Matches began at 11 am (1:30 pm on Centre Court and 1:00 pm on No. 1 Court) BST

== Day 12 (10 July) ==
- Seeds out:
  - Gentlemen's Singles: (Serbia) Novak Djokovic [7]
  - Ladies' Doubles: (Japan) Shuko Aoyama / (Chinese Taipei) Liang En-shuo [13]
- Schedule of play

Matches on main courts
Matches on Centre Court
Event	Winner	Loser	Score
Gentlemen's Singles – Semi-finals	(Germany) Alexander Zverev [2]	(United Kingdom) Arthur Fery [WC]	7–6^{(7–0)}, 6–2, 6–4
Gentlemen's Singles – Semi-finals	(Italy) Jannik Sinner [1]	(Serbia) Novak Djokovic [7]	6–4, 6–4, 6–4
Matches on No. 1 Court
Event	Winner	Loser	Score
Ladies' Doubles – Semi-finals	(Canada) Gabriela Dabrowski [2] (Brazil) Luisa Stefani [2]	(Japan) Shuko Aoyama [13] (Chinese Taipei) Liang En-shuo [13]	7–5, 6–3
Gentlemen's Wheelchair Singles – Semi-finals	(United Kingdom) Alfie Hewett [2]	(Argentina) Gustavo Fernández [4]	6–7^{(2–7)}, 6–0, 6–3
Ladies' Doubles – Semi-finals	(China) Guo Hanyu [10] (France) Kristina Mladenovic [10]	(China) Jiang Xinyu (China) Xu Yifan	7–6^{(7–5)}, 6−4
Matches on No. 3 Court
Event	Winner	Loser	Score
Ladies' Invitation Doubles Round Robin	(Canada) Eugenie Bouchard (Estonia) Anett Kontaveit	(Germany) Sabine Lisicki (United Kingdom) Katie O'Brien	6–4, 6–7^{(6–7)}, [10–8]
Gentlemen's Wheelchair Singles – Semi-finals	(Japan) Tokito Oda [1]	(Spain) Martín de la Puente [3]	7–5, 6–3
Ladies' Invitation Doubles Round Robin	(Poland) Agnieszka Radwańska (Denmark) Caroline Wozniacki	(Germany) Angelique Kerber (Germany) Andrea Petkovic	7–5, 6–3
Mixed Invitation Doubles Round Robin	(Germany) Tommy Haas (Switzerland) Martina Hingis	(France) Sébastien Grosjean (France) Tatiana Golovin	6–2, 6–0
Gentlemen's Invitation Doubles Round Robin	(United States) Bob Bryan (United States) Mike Bryan	(United States) James Blake (United Kingdom) Kyle Edmund	6–1, 6–2
Matches began at 11 am (1:30 pm on Centre Court and 1:00 pm on No. 1 Court) BST

== Day 13 (11 July) ==
- Seeds out:
  - Ladies' Singles: (Czech Republic) Karolína Muchová [10]
  - Gentlemen's Doubles: (El Salvador) Marcelo Arévalo / (Croatia) Mate Pavić [6]
- Schedule of play

Matches on main courts
Matches on Centre Court
Event	Winner	Loser	Score
Gentlemen's Doubles Final	(Finland) Harri Heliövaara [1] (United Kingdom) Henry Patten [1]	(El Salvador) Marcelo Arévalo [6] (Croatia) Mate Pavić [6]	7–6^{(7–4)}, 7–6^{(7–3)}
Ladies' Singles Final	(Czech Republic) Linda Nosková [9]	(Czech Republic) Karolína Muchová [10]	6–2, 5–7, 6–3
Matches on No. 1 Court
Event	Winner	Loser	Score
Gentlemen's Wheelchair Doubles Final	(United Kingdom) Alfie Hewett [1] (United Kingdom) Gordon Reid [1]	(Argentina) Gustavo Fernández (Japan) Tokito Oda	2–6, 6–1, 6–2
Girls' Singles Final	Anna Pushkareva [14]	(China) Sun Xinran [1]	5–7, 6–3, 6–4
Boys' Doubles Final	(Brazil) Luís Guto Miguel [1] (Slovenia) Žiga Šeško [1]	(United States) Michael Antonius [2] (United States) Andrew Johnson [2]	6–1, 6–4
Matches on No. 3 Court
Event	Winner	Loser	Score
Ladies' Wheelchair Singles Final	(Japan) Yui Kamiji [1]	(Netherlands) Diede de Groot [2]	6–0, 6–0
Quad Wheelchair Doubles Final	(Israel) Guy Sasson [1] (Netherlands) Niels Vink [1]	(Netherlands) Sam Schröder [2] (Australia) Jin Woodman [2]	6–2, 6–1
Matches began at 11 am (1:00 pm on Centre Court) BST

== Day 14 (12 July) ==
- Seeds out:
  - Gentlemen's Singles: (Germany) Alexander Zverev [2]
  - Ladies' Doubles: (Canada) Gabriela Dabrowski / (Brazil) Luisa Stefani [2]
- Schedule of play

Matches on main courts
Matches on Centre Court
Event	Winner	Loser	Score
Ladies' Doubles Final	(China) Guo Hanyu [10] (France) Kristina Mladenovic [10]	(Canada) Gabriela Dabrowski [2] (Brazil) Luisa Stefani [2]	6−3, 7−5
Gentlemen's Singles Final	(Italy) Jannik Sinner [1]	(Germany) Alexander Zverev [2]	6–7^{(7–9)}, 7–6^{(7–2)}, 6–3, 6–4
Matches on No. 1 Court
Event	Winner	Loser	Score
Gentlemen's Wheelchair Singles Final	(Japan) Tokito Oda [1]	(United Kingdom) Alfie Hewett [2]	6–1, 6–1
Boys' Singles Final	(United States) Jordan Lee [Q]	(Australia) Cruz Hewitt	4–6, 6–4, 7–5
Ladies' Invitation Doubles Final	(Slovakia) Magdaléna Rybáriková (Czech Republic) Lucie Šafářová	(Slovakia) Dominika Cibulková (Czech Republic) Barbora Strýcová	6–2, 6–3
Matches on No. 3 Court
Event	Winner	Loser	Score
Wheelchair Quad Singles Final	(Netherlands) Niels Vink [1]	(Netherlands) Sam Schröder [2]	6–1, 6–3
Ladies' Wheelchair Doubles Final	(Japan) Yui Kamiji [1] (China) Zhu Zhenzhen [1]	(China) Li Xiaohui [2] (China) Wang Ziying [2]	6−4, 7−5
Matches began at 11 am (1:00 pm on Centre Court) BST
