= 2026 Wimbledon Championships – Girls' singles =

Tennis championship

Girls' singles
- 2026 Wimbledon Championships

Final
- Champion: Anna Pushkareva
- Runner-up: (China) Sun Xinran
- Score: 5–7, 6–3, 6–4
- Date: 11 July 2026

Details
- Draw: 64 (8 Q)
- Seeds: 16

Events
Singles	men	women		boys	girls
Doubles	men	women	mixed	boys	girls
WC Singles	men	women	quad
WC Doubles	men	women	quad
14&U Singles	boys	girls
Legends	men	women	mixed
- Wimbledon Championships

Anna Pushkareva won the girls' singles title at the 2026 Wimbledon Championships, defeating Sun Xinran in the final, 5–7, 6–3, 6–4.

Mia Pohánková was the reigning champion, but chose not to compete this year. She received a wildcard into the women's singles qualifying competition, where she lost in the first round to Harmony Tan.

== Seeds ==
1. (China) Sun Xinran (final)
2. (France) Ksenia Efremova (second round)
3. (Czech Republic) Jana Kovačková (third round)
4. (Brazil) Victoria Luiza Barros (second round)
5. (Brazil) Nauhany Vitória Leme da Silva (first round)
6. (Serbia) Anastasija Cvetković (first round)
7. Mariia Makarova (quarterfinals)
8. (Argentina) Sol Ailin Larraya Guidi (first round)
9. (Germany) Mariella Thamm (third round)
10. (Spain) Charo Esquiva Bañuls (third round)
11. (Spain) Paola Piñera Celorio (first round)
12. (United Kingdom) Mika Stojsavljevic (second round)
13. Felitsata Dorofeeva-Rybas (second round)
14. Anna Pushkareva (champion)
15. (Ukraine) Polina Skliar (semifinals)
16. (India) Maaya Rajeshwaran Revathi (first round)

Click on the seed number of a player to go to their draw section.

== Draw ==
Key

- Q = Qualifier
- WC = Wild card
- LL = Lucky loser
- Alt = Alternate
- ITF = ITF entry
- PR = Protected ranking
- SR = Special ranking
- SE = Special exempt
- JE = Junior exempt
- JR = Junior Accelerator Programme entrant
- CO = College Accelerator Programme entrant
- NG = Next Gen Accelerator Program entrant
- w/o = Walkover
- r = Retired
- d = Defaulted

=== Finals ===
Quarterfinals
1	(China) Sun Xinran	6	6
Q	(Austria) Anna Pircher	0	3
(Germany) Emily Eigelsbach	3	1
(United States) Janae Preston	6	6
7	Mariia Makarova	3	7^{7}	4
15	(Ukraine) Polina Skliar	6	6^{3}	6
(China) Qu Yihan	3	6	3
14	Anna Pushkareva	6	3	6

Semifinals
1	(China) Sun Xinran	6	6
(United States) Janae Preston	1	3
15	(Ukraine) Polina Skliar	4	6	1
14	Anna Pushkareva	6	2	6

Final
1	(China) Sun Xinran	7	3	4
14	Anna Pushkareva	5	6	6

=== Top half ===
==== Section 1 ====
First round
1	(China) Sun Xinran	6	6
(Chinese Taipei) Lin Yu-chen	1	1
(Czech Republic) Denisa Žoldáková	6	6
Q	(Japan) Riyo Yoshida	0	2
(South Korea) Jeong Ui-su	7^{7}	3	2
(United States) Thea Frodin	6^{2}	6	6
WC	(United Kingdom) Sophie Bekker	4	2
13	Felitsata Dorofeeva-Rybas	6	6
12	(United Kingdom) Mika Stojsavljevic	6	6
(United States) Welles Newman	0	4
Q	(Austria) Anna Pircher	2	7	6
(Ukraine) Sofiia Bielinska	6	5	1
(Germany) Ida Wobker	0	5^{d}
(Romania) Maria Valentina Pop	6	5
WC	(United Kingdom) Daniella Britton	6	6
8	(Argentina) Sol Ailin Larraya Guidi	3	3

Second round
1	(China) X Sun	7	6
(Czech Republic) D Žoldáková	5	1
(United States) T Frodin	7^{7}	7
13	F Dorofeeva-Rybas	6^{2}	5
12	(United Kingdom) M Stojsavljevic	6	4	2
Q	(Austria) A Pircher	4	6	6
(Romania) MV Pop	6	1	4
WC	(United Kingdom) D Britton	2	6	6

Third round
1	(China) X Sun	6	6
(United States) T Frodin	3	4
Q	(Austria) A Pircher	6^{4}	6	6
WC	(United Kingdom) D Britton	7^{7}	1	1

Quarterfinals
1	(China) X Sun	6	6
Q	(Austria) A Pircher	0	3

==== Section 2 ====
First round
3	(Czech Republic) Jana Kovačková	3	6	6
(United States) Lani Chang	6	4	3
(China) Zhang Ruien	6	6
WC	(United Kingdom) Liv Zingg	3	0
Q	(United States) Emery Combs	2	4
(Latvia) Adelina Lachinova	6	6
(Germany) Emily Eigelsbach	7	6
16	(India) Maaya Rajeshwaran Revathi	5	2
10	(Spain) Charo Esquiva Bañuls	7	6
(Czech Republic) Kateřina Zajíčková	5	4
Q	(United States) Carrie-Anne Hoo	6	6
WC	(United Kingdom) Megan Knight	4	0
Polina Berezina	4	6^{4}
(United States) Janae Preston	6	7^{7}
Q	(United States) Olivia Traynor	6	3	7^{10}
5	(Brazil) Nauhany Vitória Leme da Silva	1	6	6^{6}

Second round
3	(Czech Republic) J Kovačková	4	6	6
(China) R Zhang	6	3	1
(Latvia) A Lachinova	6	5	3
(Germany) E Eigelsbach	1	7	6
10	(Spain) C Esquiva Bañuls	6	6
Q	(United States) C-A Hoo	2	3
(United States) J Preston	6	7
Q	(United States) O Traynor	1	5

Third round
3	(Czech Republic) J Kovačková	6	6^{3}	4
(Germany) E Eigelsbach	4	7^{7}	6
10	(Spain) C Esquiva Bañuls	2	4
(United States) J Preston	6	6

Quarterfinals
(Germany) E Eigelsbach	3	1
(United States) J Preston	6	6

=== Bottom half ===
==== Section 3 ====
First round
7	Mariia Makarova	6	6
WC	(United Kingdom) Edie Griffiths	3	1
(Czech Republic) Sofie Hettlerová	3	3
(United States) Jordyn Hazelitt	6	6
Q	(Sweden) Iva Marinkovic	3	3
(China) Shao Yushan	6	6
Q	(Italy) Ilary Pistola	7^{9}	6
11	(Spain) Paola Piñera Celorio	6^{7}	2
15	(Ukraine) Polina Skliar	6	6
Ekaterina Dotsenko	4	3
WC	(United Kingdom) Ophelia Korpanec Davies	0	4
(Jamaica) Alyssa James	6	6
(Romania) Maia Ilinca Burcescu	4	7^{7}	6
(United States) Anita Tu	6	6^{3}	2
WC	(United Kingdom) Tegan Bush	2	6	6^{7}
4	(Brazil) Victoria Luiza Barros	6	3	7^{10}

Second round
7	M Makarova	7	7^{7}
(United States) J Hazelitt	5	6^{3}
(China) Y Shao	6	6
Q	(Italy) I Pistola	4	3
15	(Ukraine) P Skliar	6	6
(Jamaica) A James	3	2
(Romania) MI Burcescu	3	7	7^{10}
4	(Brazil) VL Barros	6	5	6^{4}

Third round
7	M Makarova	6	6
(China) Y Shao	2	0
15	(Ukraine) P Skliar	6^{5}	6	6
(Romania) MI Burcescu	7^{7}	3	2

Quarterfinals
7	M Makarova	3	7^{7}	4
15	(Ukraine) P Skliar	6	6^{3}	6

==== Section 4 ====
First round
6	(Serbia) Anastasija Cvetković	6	1	6^{4}
(China) Qu Yihan	3	6	7^{10}
(Czech Republic) Tereza Heřmanová	6	6
WC	(United Kingdom) Annabel Wong	4	3
Q	(Netherlands) Fleur de Bresser	6	3	4
(Canada) Nadia Lagaev	4	6	6
LL	(United States) Hannah Ayrault	2	0
9	(Germany) Mariella Thamm	6	6
14	Anna Pushkareva	7^{7}	6
(China) Lin Yujun	6^{5}	4
(United Kingdom) Hollie Smart	5	2
(Australia) Renee Alame	7	6
(Czech Republic) Veronika Sekerková	0	2
(United States) Chukwumelije Clarke	6	6
(Romania) Giulia Safina Popa	1	0
2	(France) Ksenia Efremova	6	6

Second round
(China) Y Qu	6	6
(Czech Republic) T Heřmanová	2	4
(Canada) N Lagaev	0	4
9	(Germany) M Thamm	6	6
14	A Pushkareva	6	6
(Australia) R Alame	4	3
(United States) C Clarke	6	6
2	(France) K Efremova	4	1

Third round
(China) Y Qu	6	4	6
9	(Germany) M Thamm	2	6	2
14	A Pushkareva	3	7	6
(United States) C Clarke	6	5	1

Quarterfinals
(China) Y Qu	3	6	3
14	A Pushkareva	6	3	6

== Qualifying ==
=== Seeds ===
1. (Italy) Ilary Pistola (second round)
2. (Netherlands) Fleur de Bresser (qualified)
3. (China) Wei Zhangqian (first round)
4. (Sweden) Iva Marinkovic (qualified)
5. (Brazil) Pietra Rivoli (qualifying competition)
6. (Chile) Camila Rodero (withdrew)
7. (United States) Hannah Ayrault (qualifying competition)
8. (United States) Olivia Traynor (second round)
9. (United States) Nancy Lee (qualifying competition)
10. (United States) Margaret Sohns (qualifying competition)
11. (United States) Sarah Ye (qualifying competition)
12. (Romania) Iulia Maria Buculei (qualifying competition)
13. (Czech Republic) Veronika Sekerková (withdrew)
14. (Poland) Barbara Kostecka (first round)
15. (United States) Carrie-Anne Hoo (qualified)
16. (Austria) Anna Pircher (quarterfinals)

=== Qualifier ===
1. (Italy) Ilary Pistola
2. (Netherlands) Fleur de Bresser
3. (United States) Emery Combs
4. (Sweden) Iva Marinkovic
5. (United States) Carrie-Anne Hoo
6. (Austria) Anna Pircher
7. (Japan) Riyo Yoshida
8. (United States) Olivia Traynor

=== Qualifying draw ===
==== First qualifier ====
First round
1	(Italy) Ilary Pistola	6	6
WC	(United Kingdom) Sophia Christodoulou	3	2
(United States) Yael Saffar	6	6
Alt	(Czech Republic) Pavla Sviglerová	3	2

Qualifying competition
1	(Italy) Ilary Pistola	6	6
(United States) Yael Saffar	3	1

==== Second qualifier ====
First round
2	(Netherlands) Fleur de Bresser	6	6
WC	(United Kingdom) Sophie Johnstone	2	2
(Australia) Jizelle Sibai	6	1	[8]
9	(United States) Nancy Lee	4	6	[10]

Qualifying competition
2	(Netherlands) Fleur de Bresser	3	6	[10]
9	(United States) Nancy Lee	6	4	[8]

==== Third qualifier ====
First round
3	(China) Wei Zhangqian	6^{2}	2
(United States) Emery Combs	7^{7}	6
WC	(United Kingdom) Hermione Korpanec Davies	3	2
11	(United States) Sarah Ye	6	6

Qualifying competition
(United States) Emery Combs	6	0	[10]
11	(United States) Sarah Ye	1	6	[6]

==== Fourth qualifier ====
First round
4	(Sweden) Iva Marinkovic	7	6
(Serbia) Lana Virc	5	4
WC	(United Kingdom) Leah Bush	3	3
10	(United States) Margaret Sohns	6	6

Qualifying competition
4	(Sweden) Iva Marinkovic	6	4	[10]
10	(United States) Margaret Sohns	4	6	[5]

==== Fifth qualifier ====
First round
5	(Brazil) Pietra Rivoli	7^{7}	6
(Switzerland) Noelia Manta	6^{4}	0
WC	(United Kingdom) Lara Savic	3	5
15	(United States) Carrie-Anne Hoo	6	7

Qualifying competition
5	(Brazil) Pietra Rivoli	2	3
15	(United States) Carrie-Anne Hoo	6	6

==== Sixth qualifier ====
First round
Alt	(China) Mailuodi Lei	6	6
(United States) Ireland O'Brien	1	0
(Mexico) Marianne Ángel	6^{4}	6	[5]
16	(Austria) Anna Pircher	7^{7}	2	[10]

Qualifying competition
Alt	(China) Mailuodi Lei	3	6	[1]
16	(Austria) Anna Pircher	6	3	[10]

==== Seventh qualifier ====
First round
7	(United States) Hannah Ayrault	6	6
(Germany) Michelle Khomich	1	1
(Japan) Riyo Yoshida	6	6
14	(Poland) Barbara Kostecka	2	4

Qualifying competition
7	(United States) Hannah Ayrault	3	3
(Japan) Riyo Yoshida	6	6

==== Eighth qualifier ====
First round
8	(United States) Olivia Traynor	6	7^{8}
(South Korea) Hong Ye-ri	3	6^{6}
WC	(United Kingdom) Teodora Prisadnikova	0	1
12	(Romania) Iulia Maria Buculei	6	6

Qualifying competition
8	(United States) Olivia Traynor	4	6	[10]
12	(Romania) Iulia Maria Buculei	6	1	[6]
