= Kateřina Zajíčková =

Czech tennis player (born 2010)

- Country (sports): Czech Republic
- Born: 7 February 2010 (age 16)

Singles
- Career record: 0–0
- Career titles: 0

Grand Slam singles results
- French Open Junior: 1R (2026)
- Wimbledon Junior: 1R (2026)
- US Open Junior: 2R (2026)

Doubles
- Career record: 0–0
- Career titles: 0

Grand Slam doubles results
- French Open Junior: W (2026)
- Wimbledon Junior: W (2026)
- US Open Junior: 2R (2026)
- Last updated on: 11 July 2026.

Kateřina Zajíčková (born 7 February 2010) is a Czech tennis player.

Zajíčková has won two major junior titles in girls' doubles with her compatriot Jana Kovačková.

== Career ==
A member of TK Sparta Prague, she was part of the Czech U14 World Team Championships winning side with a 2–1 win against the United States alongside Jana Kovačková and Laura Chlumská in August 2024.

As a 16 year-old in April 2026, she won two J300 titles in Cairo in a single day, winning in the singles and the doubles, alongside Ayse Balová.

Playing alongside Jana Kovačková, she won the final of the girls' doubles at the 2026 French Open on her junior grand slam debut, with the pair rekindling their partnership having played together at younger age-group levels with the pair playing American eighth seeds Jordyn Hazelitt and Welles Newman in the final. She also came through qualifying to play in the first round of the girls' singles at the championships, losing to Chinese player Sun Xinran in the first round. The pair lost just seventeen games across the five matches they played together in the tournament.

Alongside Kovačková, Zajíčková also won the girls' doubles at the 2026 Wimbledon Championships the following month.

== Junior Grand Slam tournament finals ==
=== Doubles: 2 (2 titles) ===
Result	Year	Tournament	Surface	Partner	Opponents	Score
Win	2026	French Open	Clay	(Czech Republic) Jana Kovačková	(United States) Jordyn Hazelitt (United States) Welles Newman	6–1, 6–4
Win	2026	Wimbledon	Grass	(Czech Republic) Jana Kovačková	(Brazil) Victoria Luiza Barros (Brazil) Nauhany Vitória Leme da Silva	7–6^{(9–7)}, 6–7^{(5–7)}, [10–6]
