= 2026 Wimbledon Championships – Wheelchair women's doubles =

Tennis championship

Wheelchair women's doubles
- 2026 Wimbledon Championships

Final
- Champions: (Japan) Yui Kamiji (China) Zhu Zhenzhen
- Runners-up: (China) Li Xiaohui (China) Wang Ziying
- Score: 6–4, 7–5
- Date: 12 July 2026

Details
- Draw: 8
- Seeds: 2

Events
Singles	men	women		boys	girls
Doubles	men	women	mixed	boys	girls
WC Singles	men	women	quad
WC Doubles	men	women	quad
14&U Singles	boys	girls
Legends	men	women	mixed
- Wimbledon Championships

Yui Kamiji and Zhu Zhenzhen defeated defending champions Li Xiaohui and Wang Ziying in the final, 6–4, 7–5 to win the ladies' doubles wheelchair tennis title at the 2026 Wimbledon Championships.

== Seeds ==
1. (Japan) Yui Kamiji / (China) Zhu Zhenzhen (champions)
2. (China) Li Xiaohui / (China) Wang Ziying (final)

== Draw ==
Key

- Q = Qualifier
- WC = Wild card
- LL = Lucky loser
- Alt = Alternate
- ITF = ITF entry
- PR = Protected ranking
- SR = Special ranking
- SE = Special exempt
- JE = Junior exempt
- JR = Junior Accelerator Programme entrant
- CO = College Accelerator Programme entrant
- NG = Next Gen Accelerator Program entrant
- w/o = Walkover
- r = Retired
- d = Defaulted

=== Finals ===
Quarterfinals
1	(Japan) Yui Kamiji (China) Zhu Zhenzhen	6	6
(Netherlands) Jinte Bos (Netherlands) Lizzy de Greef	1	2
(South Africa) Kgothatso Montjane (United Kingdom) Lucy Shuker	6	4	6
(France) Ksénia Chasteau (Netherlands) Jiske Griffioen	3	6	3
(Netherlands) Diede de Groot (Netherlands) Aniek van Koot	6	6
(China) Guo Luoyao (Japan) Momoko Ohtani	3	2
(Colombia) Angélica Bernal (United Kingdom) Cornelia Oosthuizen	1	0
2	(China) Li Xiaohui (China) Wang Ziying	6	6

Semifinals
1	(Japan) Yui Kamiji (China) Zhu Zhenzhen	6	6
(South Africa) Kgothatso Montjane (United Kingdom) Lucy Shuker	3	2
(Netherlands) Diede de Groot (Netherlands) Aniek van Koot	4	7^{7}	2
2	(China) Li Xiaohui (China) Wang Ziying	6	6^{4}	6

Final
1	(Japan) Yui Kamiji (China) Zhu Zhenzhen	6	7
2	(China) Li Xiaohui (China) Wang Ziying	4	5
