= Shao Yushan =

Chinese tennis player (born 2008)

- Country (sports): China
- Born: 26 December 2008 (age 17)
- Prize money: US$ 32,613

Singles
- Highest ranking: No. 740 (14 September 2026)
- Current ranking: No. 752 (28 September 2026)

Grand Slam singles results
- Australian Open Junior: QF (2026)
- French Open Junior: 2R (2026)
- Wimbledon Junior: 3R (2026)

Doubles
- Highest ranking: No. 667 (14 September 2026)
- Current ranking: No. 678 (28 September 2026)

Grand Slam doubles results
- French Open Junior: 2R (2026)
- Wimbledon Junior: 2R (2025)
- Last updated on: 6 October 2025.

Shao Yushan (born 26 December 2008) is a Chinese tennis player. She has a career-high WTA singles ranking of world No. 740, achieved on 14 September 2026.

== Junior career ==
In May 2025, she won the J300 Nonthaburi Closed Regional Championships. Competing at the 2025 Wimbledon Championships in the girls' doubles she recorded a victory in the first round over British pair Daniella Britton and Edie Griffiths, whilst playing alongside her compatriot Sun Xinran.

She reached the quarter-finals of the girls' singles at the 2026 Australian Open in Melbourne before losing to Rada Zolotareva.

== Senior career ==
In September 2026 at the age of 17 years-old, she made her singles debut on the WTA Tour as a wildcard at the 2026 China Open in the women's singles, losing in two sets against Anastasia Zakharova.

== Personal life ==
She was educated at Beijing Daoxianghu School. Her maternal grandparents were professional volleyball players.
