= 2026 Wimbledon Championships – Boys' 14&U singles =

Tennis event at the 2026 Wimbledon Championships

Boys' 14&U singles
- 2026 Wimbledon Championships

Final
- Champion: (Switzerland) Jonas Wälti
- Runner-up: (Japan) Lyoma Hotelier
- Score: 3–6, 6–1, [10–6]
- Date: 12 July 2026

Details
- Draw: 16

Events
Singles	men	women		boys	girls
Doubles	men	women	mixed	boys	girls
WC Singles	men	women	quad
WC Doubles	men	women	quad
14&U Singles	boys	girls
Legends	men	women	mixed
- Wimbledon Championships

Jonas Wälti defeated Lyoma Hotelier in the final, 3–6, 6–1, [10–6], to win the boys' 14&U singles title at the 2026 Wimbledon Championships.

Moritz Freitag was the reigning champion, but chose not to participate this year.

== Format ==
The event is being played as a 16-player round-robin tournament. The players are divided into four groups of four, with each group winner advancing to the semi-finals. The remaining players compete in consolation play-offs.

== Draw ==
=== Finals ===
Semi-finals
A1	(Australia) Novak Palombo	4	6	[7]
D4	(Switzerland) Jonas Wälti	6	1	[10]
C3	(Switzerland) Noah Honsberger	6^{1}	6	[9]
B1	(Japan) Lyoma Hotelier	7^{7}	3	[11]

Final
A1	(Switzerland) Jonas Wälti	3	6	[10]
B1	(Japan) Lyoma Hotelier	6	1	[6]

=== Group A ===
		(Australia) Palombo	(Indonesia) Frans	(Brazil) Monte	(United Kingdom) Sharkey	RR; W–L	Set; W–L	Game; W–L	Standings
A1	(Australia) Novak Palombo		7–5, 6–1	6–0, 6–2	6–4, 7–6^{(7–2)}	3–0	6–0	38–18	1
A2	(Indonesia) Ethan Jake Frans	5–7, 1–6		6–2, 6–1	2–6, 2–6	1–2	2–4	22–28	3
A3	(Brazil) Dante Monte	0–6, 2–6	2–6, 1–6		4–6, 6–7^{(8–10)}	0–3	0–6	15–37	4
A4	(United Kingdom) Liam Sharkey	4–6, 6–7^{(2–7)}	6–2, 6–2	6–4, 7–6^{(10–8)}		2–1	4–2	35–27	2

=== Group B ===
		(Japan) Hotelier	(United Kingdom) Laskowski	(Colombia) González Osorio	(United States) Bender	RR; W–L	Set; W–L	Game; W–L	Standings
B1	(Japan) Lyoma Hotelier		7–5, 6–2	6–3, 6–0	6–2, 6–2	3–0	6–0	37–14	1
B2	(United Kingdom) Oskar Laskowski	5–7, 2–6		6–2, 6–1	7–6^{(7–4)}, 6–2	2–1	4–2	32–24	2
B3	(Colombia) Mathias González Osorio	3–6, 0–6	2–6, 1–6		2–6, 2–6	0–3	0–6	10–36	4
B4	(United States) David Bender	2–6, 2–6	6–7^{(4–7)}, 2–6	6–2, 6–2		1–2	2–4	24–29	3

=== Group C ===
		(Slovakia) Adamča	(Cyprus) Mosaikos	(Switzerland) Honsberger	(India) Manohar	RR; W–L	Set; W–L	Game; W–L	Standings
C1	(Slovakia) Martin Adamča		6–7^{(9–11)}, 6–1, [10–7]	4–6, 4–6	6–1, 6–2	2–1	4–3	33–23	3
C2	(Cyprus) Anastasis Mosaikos	7–6^{(11–9)}, 1–6, [7–10]		3–6, 6–2, [10–8]	6–4, 6–2	2–1	5–3	30–27	2
C3	(Switzerland) Noah Honsberger	6–4, 6–4	6–3, 2–6, [8–10]		6–3, 6–3	2–1	5–2	32–24	1
C4	(India) Puneeth Manohar	1–6, 2–6	4–6, 2–6	3–6, 3–6		0–3	0–6	15–36	4

=== Group D ===
		(China) Li	(Uzbekistan) Farkhodov	(United Kingdom) Griffith	(Switzerland) Wälti	RR; W–L	Set; W–L	Game; W–L	Standings
D1	(China) Li Yanru		4–6, 6–2, [8–10]	3–6, 6–4, [10–5]	4–6, 1–6	1–2	3–5	25–31	3
D2	(Uzbekistan) Saidaslam Farkhodov	6–4, 2–6, [10–8]		7–6^{(7–4)}, 6–2	2–6, 2–6	2–1	4–3	26–30	2
D3	(United Kingdom) Caleb Griffith	6–3, 4–6, [5–10]	6–7^{(4–7)}, 2–6		2–6, 7–5, [5–10]	0–3	2–6	27–34	4
D4	(Switzerland) Jonas Wälti	6–4, 6–1	6–2, 6–2	6–2, 5–7, [10–5]		3–0	6–1	36–18	1

Standings are determined by: 1. number of wins; 2. number of matches played; 3. in two-player ties, head-to-head record; 4. in three-player ties, percentage of sets won, then percentage of games won.

=== Consolation play-offs ===
First round
B2	(United Kingdom) Oskar Laskowski	6	4	[7]
D2	(Uzbekistan) Saidaslam Farkhodov	2	6	[10]
A4	(United Kingdom) Liam Sharkey	5	2
C2	(Cyprus) Anastasis Mosaikos	7	6

Second round
D2	(Uzbekistan) Saidaslam Farkhodov	7^{7}	3	[9]
C2	(Cyprus) Anastasis Mosaikos	6^{4}	6	[11]

First round
B4	(United States) David Bender	6	3	[10]
C1	(Slovakia) Martin Adamča	3	6	[8]
D1	(China) Li Yanru	5	6	[7]
A2	(Indonesia) Ethan Jake Frans	7	4	[10]

Second round
B4	(United States) David Bender	2	6^{5}
A2	(Indonesia) Ethan Jake Frans	6	7^{7}

First round
A3	(Brazil) Dante Monte	6^{1}	4
D3	(United Kingdom) Caleb Griffith	7^{7}	6
C4	(India) Puneeth Manohar	6	6
B3	(Colombia) Mathias González Osorio	4	1

Second round
D3	(United Kingdom) Caleb Griffith	6	4	[10]
C4	(India) Puneeth Manohar	3	6	[4]
