= 2026 Wimbledon Championships – Girls' doubles =

Tennis championship

Girls' doubles
- 2026 Wimbledon Championships

Final
- Champions: (Czech Republic) Jana Kovačková (Czech Republic) Kateřina Zajíčková
- Runners-up: (Brazil) Victoria Luiza Barros (Brazil) Nauhany Vitória Leme da Silva
- Score: 7–6^{(9–7)}, 6–7^{(5–7)}, [10–6]
- Date: 11 July 2026

Details
- Draw: 32
- Seeds: 8

Events
Singles	men	women		boys	girls
Doubles	men	women	mixed	boys	girls
WC Singles	men	women	quad
WC Doubles	men	women	quad
14&U Singles	boys	girls
Legends	men	women	mixed
- Wimbledon Championships

Jana Kovačková and Kateřina Zajíčková won the girls' doubles title at the 2026 Wimbledon Championships, defeating Victoria Luiza Barros and Nauhany Vitória Leme da Silva in the final, 7–6^{(9–7)}, 6–7^{(5–7)}, [10–6]. With this title, Kovačková completed the non-calendar year Grand Slam in girls‘ doubles, having previously won the 2025 US Open and the 2026 Australian and French Opens.

Kristina Penickova and Vendula Valdmannová were the defending champions, but they did not compete this year.

== Seeds ==
1. (Brazil) Victoria Luiza Barros / (Brazil) Nauhany Vitória Leme da Silva (final)
2. (Spain) Charo Esquiva Bañuls / (Spain) Paola Piñera Celorio (first round)
3. Felitsata Dorofeeva-Rybas / Anna Pushkareva (quarterfinals)
4. (China) Sun Xinran / (China) Zhang Ruien (first round)
5. (Czech Republic) Jana Kovačková / (Czech Republic) Kateřina Zajíčková (champions)
6. Ekaterina Dotsenko / (Germany) Mariella Thamm (second round, retired)
7. (United States) Thea Frodin / (India) Maaya Rajeshwaran Revathi (quarterfinals)
8. (Germany) Ida Wobker / (Czech Republic) Denisa Žoldáková (semifinals)

== Draw ==
Key

- Q = Qualifier
- WC = Wild card
- LL = Lucky loser
- Alt = Alternate
- ITF = ITF entry
- PR = Protected ranking
- SR = Special ranking
- SE = Special exempt
- JE = Junior exempt
- JR = Junior Accelerator Programme entrant
- CO = College Accelerator Programme entrant
- NG = Next Gen Accelerator Program entrant
- w/o = Walkover
- r = Retired
- d = Defaulted

=== Finals ===
Semifinals
1	(Brazil) Victoria Luiza Barros (Brazil) Nauhany Vitória Leme da Silva	4	6	[10]
Polina Berezina (Serbia) Anastasija Cvetković	6	2	[1]
5	(Czech Republic) Jana Kovačková (Czech Republic) Kateřina Zajíčková	6	6
8	(Germany) Ida Wobker (Czech Republic) Denisa Žoldáková	4	1

Final
1	(Brazil) Victoria Luiza Barros (Brazil) Nauhany Vitória Leme da Silva	6^{7}	7^{7}	[6]
5	(Czech Republic) Jana Kovačková (Czech Republic) Kateřina Zajíčková	7^{9}	6^{5}	[10]

=== Top half ===
First round
1	(Brazil) Victoria Luiza Barros (Brazil) Nauhany Vitória Leme da Silva	6	6
WC	(United Kingdom) Tegan Bush (United Kingdom) Teodora Prisadnikova	4	2
(United States) Nancy Lee (United States) Janae Preston	6	2	[10]
(Romania) Maria Valentina Pop (United States) Anita Tu	2	6	[12]
(Italy) Ilary Pistola (Romania) Giulia Safina Popa	7^{8}	2	[12]
(Chinese Taipei) Lin Yu-chen (China) Qu Yihan	6^{6}	6	[10]
(Romania) Maia Ilinca Burcescu (Ukraine) Polina Skliar	4	5
7	(United States) Thea Frodin (India) Maaya Rajeshwaran Revathi	6	7
4	(China) Sun Xinran (China) Zhang Ruien	7^{12}	3	[11]
(United States) Jordyn Hazelitt (United States) Welles Newman	6^{10}	6	[13]
WC	(United Kingdom) Daniella Britton (United Kingdom) Edie Griffiths	6	6
(Czech Republic) Tereza Heřmanová (Czech Republic) Veronika Sekerková	3	4
Polina Berezina (Serbia) Anastasija Cvetković	6	6
(Czech Republic) Sofie Hettlerová (China) Shao Yushan	2	4
(Netherlands) Fleur de Bresser (South Korea) Jeong Ui-su	4	4
6	Ekaterina Dotsenko (Germany) Mariella Thamm	6	6

Second round
1	(Brazil) VL Barros (Brazil) NV Leme da Silva	6	2	[10]
(Romania) MV Pop (United States) A Tu	4	6	[4]
(Italy) I Pistola (Romania) GS Popa	7	5	[3]
7	(United States) T Frodin (India) M Rajeshwaran Revathi	5	7	[10]
(United States) J Hazelitt (United States) W Newman	6^{3}	6	[10]
WC	(United Kingdom) D Britton (United Kingdom) E Griffiths	7^{7}	2	[2]
P Berezina (Serbia) A Cvetković	6	3
6	E Dotsenko (Germany) M Thamm	0	0^{r}

Quarterfinals
1	(Brazil) VL Barros (Brazil) NV Leme da Silva	3	6	[10]
7	(United States) T Frodin (India) M Rajeshwaran Revathi	6	4	[6]
(United States) J Hazelitt (United States) W Newman	2	2
P Berezina (Serbia) A Cvetković	6	6

Semifinals
1	(Brazil) VL Barros (Brazil) NV Leme da Silva	4	6	[10]
P Berezina (Serbia) A Cvetković	6	2	[1]

=== Bottom half ===
First round
5	(Czech Republic) Jana Kovačková (Czech Republic) Kateřina Zajíčková	7	7^{7}
(Ukraine) Sofiia Bielinska (Canada) Nadia Lagaev	5	6^{1}
(Jamaica) Alyssa James (Argentina) Sol Ailin Larraya Guidi	6	6
(United States) Carrie-Anne Hoo (Sweden) Iva Marinkovic	2	1
(United States) Chukwumelije Clarke (United States) Olivia Traynor	6	6
WC	(United Kingdom) Sophie Bekker (United Kingdom) Liv Zingg	3	2
(Australia) Renee Alame (Latvia) Adelina Lachinova	2	2
3	Felitsata Dorofeeva-Rybas; Anna Pushkareva	6	6
8	(Germany) Ida Wobker (Czech Republic) Denisa Žoldáková	6	7^{7}
(Poland) Barbara Kostecka; Mariia Makarova	0	6^{3}
(United States) Lani Chang (United States) Margaret Sohns	7	6
(Germany) Emily Eigelsbach (United Kingdom) Hollie Smart	5	3
WC	(United Kingdom) Megan Knight (United Kingdom) Annabel Wong	4	5
(Austria) Anna Pircher (Japan) Riyo Yoshida	6	7
(China) Mailuodi Lei (China) Lin Yujun	2	6	[10]
2	(Spain) Charo Esquiva Bañuls (Spain) Paola Piñera Celorio	6	4	[8]

Second round
5	(Czech Republic) J Kovačková (Czech Republic) K Zajíčková	7^{7}	6
(Jamaica) A James (Argentina) SA Larraya Guidi	6^{3}	2
(United States) C Clarke (United States) O Traynor	7^{9}	4	[5]
3	F Dorofeeva-Rybas; A Pushkareva	6^{7}	6	[10]
8	(Germany) I Wobker (Czech Republic) D Žoldáková	6	6
(United States) L Chang (United States) M Sohns	1	2
(Austria) A Pircher (Japan) R Yoshida	7^{7}	7^{7}
(China) M Lei (China) Y Lin	6^{3}	6^{5}

Quarterfinals
5	(Czech Republic) J Kovačková (Czech Republic) K Zajíčková	6	6
3	F Dorofeeva-Rybas; A Pushkareva	4	4
8	(Germany) I Wobker (Czech Republic) D Žoldáková	6	6
(Austria) A Pircher (Japan) R Yoshida	1	1

Semifinals
5	(Czech Republic) J Kovačková (Czech Republic) K Zajíčková	6	6
8	(Germany) I Wobker (Czech Republic) D Žoldáková	4	1
