= 2026 Wimbledon Championships – Girls' 14&U singles =

Tennis event at the 2026 Wimbledon Championships

Girls' 14&U singles
- 2026 Wimbledon Championships

Final
- Champion: (United States) Isha Manchala
- Runner-up: (Ukraine) Mariia Kocherzhenko
- Score: 7–5, 2–6, [10–8]
- Date: 12 July 2026

Details
- Draw: 16

Events
| Singles | men | women | | boys | girls |
| Doubles | men | women | mixed | boys | girls |
| WC Singles | men | women | quad |
| WC Doubles | men | women | quad |
| 14&U Singles | boys | girls |
| Legends | men | women | mixed |
- Wimbledon Championships

Isha Manchala defeated Mariia Kocherzhenko in the final, 7–5, 2–6, [10–8], to win the girls' 14&U singles title at the 2026 Wimbledon Championships.

Sakino Miyazawa was the reigning champion, but chose not to participate this year.

== Format ==
The event is being played as a 16-player round-robin tournament. The players are divided into four groups of four, with each group winner advancing to the semi-finals. The remaining players compete in consolation play-offs.

== Draw ==
=== Finals ===
Semi-finals
A1 | (United States) Isha Manchala | 6 | 6
D3 | Lyubov Pronenko | 1 | 0
C2 | (Brazil) Eduarda Gomes | 3 | 5
B4 | (Ukraine) Mariia Kocherzhenko | 6 | 7

Final
A1 | (United States) Isha Manchala | 7 | 2 | [10]
B4 | (Ukraine) Mariia Kocherzhenko | 5 | 6 | [8]

=== Group A ===
| | | (United States) Manchala | (Chinese Taipei) Hsu | (United Kingdom) Rebel | (Japan) Iwasa | RR; W–L | Set; W–L | Game; W–L | Standings |
| A1 | (United States) Isha Manchala | | 6–1, 6–2 | 7–5, 6–2 | 6–2, 6–1 | 3–0 | 6–0 | 37–13 | 1 |
| A2 | (Chinese Taipei) Hsu Ke-chieh | 1–6, 2–6 | | 7–5, 6–1 | 6–4, 6–4 | 2–1 | 4–2 | 28–26 | 2 |
| A3 | (United Kingdom) Isabella Rebel | 5–7, 2–6 | 5–7, 1–6 | | 2–6, 5–7 | 0–3 | 0–6 | 20–39 | 4 |
| A4 | (Japan) Ayaka Iwasa | 2–6, 1–6 | 4–6, 4–6 | 6–2, 7–5 | | 1–2 | 2–4 | 24–31 | 3 |

=== Group B ===
| | | (Denmark) Henningsen | (Brazil) Carvalho | (Australia) Hirschi | (Ukraine) Kocherzhenko | RR; W–L | Set; W–L | Game; W–L | Standings |
| B1 | (Denmark) Emilia Henningsen | | 6–4, 6–1 | 7–6^{(7–3)}, 6–1 | 4–6, 3–6 | 2–1 | 4–2 | 32–24 | 2 |
| B2 | (Brazil) Gabriela Carvalho | 4–6, 1–6 | | 6–4, 3–6, [4–10] | 3–6, 0–6 | 0–3 | 1–6 | 17–35 | 4 |
| B3 | (Australia) Claire Hirschi | 6–7^{(3–7)}, 1–6 | 4–6, 6–3, [10–4] | | 4–6, 7–6^{(7–4)}, [12–14] | 1–2 | 3–5 | 29–35 | 3 |
| B4 | (Ukraine) Mariia Kocherzhenko | 6–4, 6–3 | 6–3, 6–0 | 6–4, 6–7^{(4–7)}, [14–12] | | 3–0 | 6–1 | 37–21 | 1 |

=== Group C ===
| | | (China) Wang | (Brazil) Gomes | (Czech Republic) Marešová | (Romania) Bulai | RR; W–L | Set; W–L | Game; W–L | Standings |
| C1 | (China) Wang Jiayi | | 6–4, 6–7^{(5–7)}, [8–10] | 6–3, 4–6, [15–13] | 6–3, 6–4 | 2–1 | 5–3 | 35–28 | 2 |
| C2 | (Brazil) Eduarda Gomes | 4–6, 7–6^{(7–5)}, [10–8] | | 4–6, 6–2, [10–12] | 1–6, 6–1, [10–4] | 2–1 | 5–4 | 30–28 | 1 |
| C3 | (Czech Republic) Beata Marešová | 3–6, 6–4, [13–15] | 6–4, 2–6, [12–10] | | 2–6, 5–7 | 1–2 | 3–5 | 25–34 | 4 |
| C4 | (Romania) Eva Maria Bulai | 3–6, 4–6 | 6–1, 1–6, [4–10] | 6–2, 7–5 | | 1–2 | 3–4 | 28–26 | 3 |

=== Group D ===
| | | (United States) Kapanadze | (United Kingdom) Kesavan | Pronenko | (India) Kiran | RR; W–L | Set; W–L | Game; W–L | Standings |
| D1 | (United States) Anna Kapanadze | | 6–7^{(2–7)}, 4–6 | 3–6, 7–6^{(7–5)}, [8–10] | 6–7^{(6–8)}, 4–6 | 0–3 | 1–6 | 30–39 | 4 |
| D2 | (United Kingdom) Nishta Kesavan | 7–6^{(7–2)}, 6–4 | | 3–6, 2–6 | 1–6, 2–6 | 1–2 | 2–4 | 21–34 | 3 |
| D3 | Lyubov Pronenko | 6–3, 6–7^{(5–7)}, [10–8] | 6–3, 6–2 | | 6–7^{(5–7)}, 7–5, [12–10] | 3–0 | 6–2 | 39–27 | 1 |
| D4 | (India) Srishti Kiran | 7–6^{(8–6)}, 6–4 | 6–1, 6–2 | 7–6^{(7–5)}, 5–7, [10–12] | | 2–1 | 5–2 | 37–27 | 2 |

Standings are determined by: 1. number of wins; 2. number of matches played; 3. in two-player ties, head-to-head record; 4. in three-player ties, percentage of sets won, then percentage of games won.

=== Consolation play-offs ===
First round
D4 | (India) Srishti Kiran | 4 | 6^{3}
C1 | (China) Wang Jiayi | 6 | 7^{7}
B1 | (Denmark) Emilia Henningsen | 6 | 6
A2 | (Chinese Taipei) Hsu Ke-chieh | 2 | 2

Second round
C1 | (China) Wang Jiayi | 4 | 1
B1 | (Denmark) Emilia Henningsen | 6 | 6

First round
C4 | (Romania) Eva Maria Bulai | 6 | 6
A4 | (Japan) Ayaka Iwasa | 1 | 3
B3 | (Australia) Claire Hirschi | 4 | 7^{7} | [10]
D2 | (United Kingdom) Nishta Kesavan | 6 | 6^{4} | [6]

Second round
C4 | (Romania) Eva Maria Bulai | 7^{7} | 6^{5} | [10]
B3 | (Australia) Claire Hirschi | 6^{5} | 7^{7} | [8]

First round
D1 | (United States) Anna Kapanadze | 4 | 3
C3 | (Czech Republic) Beata Marešová | 6 | 6
A3 | (United Kingdom) Isabella Rebel | 6 | 6
B2 | (Brazil) Gabriela Carvalho | 0 | 2

Second round
C3 | (Czech Republic) Beata Marešová | 5 | 6 | [10]
A3 | (United Kingdom) Isabella Rebel | 7 | 2 | [8]
