= 2026 Wimbledon Championships – Wheelchair women's singles =

Tennis championship

Wheelchair women's singles
- 2026 Wimbledon Championships

Final
- Champion: (Japan) Yui Kamiji
- Runner-up: (Netherlands) Diede de Groot
- Score: 6–0, 6–0
- Date: 11 July 2026

Details
- Draw: 16
- Seeds: 4

Events
Singles	men	women		boys	girls
Doubles	men	women	mixed	boys	girls
WC Singles	men	women	quad
WC Doubles	men	women	quad
14&U Singles	boys	girls
Legends	men	women	mixed
- Wimbledon Championships

Yui Kamiji defeated Diede de Groot in the final, 6–0, 6–0 to win the ladies' singles wheelchair tennis title at the 2026 Wimbledon Championships. It was her first Wimbledon singles title and twelfth major singles title overall, completing the career Golden Slam.

Wang Ziying was the defending champion, but lost in the semifinals to Kamiji.

== Seeds ==
1. (Japan) Yui Kamiji (champion)
2. (Netherlands) Diede de Groot (final)
3. (China) Li Xiaohui (semifinals)
4. (China) Wang Ziying (semifinals)

== Draw ==
Key

- Q = Qualifier
- WC = Wild card
- LL = Lucky loser
- Alt = Alternate
- ITF = ITF entry
- PR = Protected ranking
- SR = Special ranking
- SE = Special exempt
- JE = Junior exempt
- JR = Junior Accelerator Programme entrant
- CO = College Accelerator Programme entrant
- NG = Next Gen Accelerator Program entrant
- w/o = Walkover
- r = Retired
- d = Defaulted

=== Finals ===
First round
1	(Japan) Yui Kamiji	6	7
(Netherlands) Jiske Griffioen	2	5
(China) Guo Luoyao	4	0
(Netherlands) Jinte Bos	6	6
4	(China) Wang Ziying	6	6
(Colombia) Angélica Bernal	2	1
(Japan) Momoko Ohtani	3	7	5
(Netherlands) Lizzy de Greef	6	5	7
(France) Ksénia Chasteau	6	6
WC	(United Kingdom) Cornelia Oosthuizen	0	0
WC	(United Kingdom) Lucy Shuker	1	3
3	(China) Li Xiaohui	6	6
(Netherlands) Aniek van Koot	6	6
(South Africa) Kgothatso Montjane	4	2
(China) Zhu Zhenzhen	3	3
2	(Netherlands) Diede de Groot	6	6

Quarterfinals
1	(Japan) Y Kamiji	6	7
(Netherlands) J Bos	2	5
4	(China) Z Wang	6	6
(Netherlands) L de Greef	3	3
(France) K Chasteau	3	1
3	(China) X Li	6	6
(Netherlands) A van Koot	4	6^{12}
2	(Netherlands) D de Groot	6	7^{14}

Semifinals
1	(Japan) Y Kamiji	4	6	7^{10}
4	(China) Z Wang	6	3	6^{4}
3	(China) X Li	4	2
2	(Netherlands) D de Groot	6	6

Final
1	(Japan) Y Kamiji	6	6
2	(Netherlands) D de Groot	0	0
