= 2026 Wimbledon Championships – Wheelchair men's doubles =

Tennis championship

Wheelchair men's doubles
- 2026 Wimbledon Championships

Final
- Champions: (United Kingdom) Alfie Hewett (United Kingdom) Gordon Reid
- Runners-up: (Argentina) Gustavo Fernández (Japan) Tokito Oda
- Score: 2–6, 6–1, 6–2
- Date: 11 July 2026

Details
- Draw: 8
- Seeds: 2

Events
Singles	men	women		boys	girls
Doubles	men	women	mixed	boys	girls
WC Singles	men	women	quad
WC Doubles	men	women	quad
14&U Singles	boys	girls
Legends	men	women	mixed
- Wimbledon Championships

Alfie Hewett and Gordon Reid defeated Gustavo Fernández and Tokito Oda in the final, 2–6, 6–1, 6–2 to win the gentlemen's doubles wheelchair tennis title at the 2026 Wimbledon Championships.

Martín de la Puente and Ruben Spaargaren were the defending champions, but lost in the semifinals to Fernández and Oda.

== Seeds ==
1. (United Kingdom) Alfie Hewett / (United Kingdom) Gordon Reid (champions)
2. (Spain) Martín de la Puente / (Netherlands) Ruben Spaargaren (semifinals)

== Draw ==
Key

- Q = Qualifier
- WC = Wild card
- LL = Lucky loser
- Alt = Alternate
- ITF = ITF entry
- PR = Protected ranking
- SR = Special ranking
- SE = Special exempt
- JE = Junior exempt
- JR = Junior Accelerator Programme entrant
- CO = College Accelerator Programme entrant
- NG = Next Gen Accelerator Program entrant
- w/o = Walkover
- r = Retired
- d = Defaulted

=== Finals ===
Quarterfinals
1	(United Kingdom) Alfie Hewett (United Kingdom) Gordon Reid	6	6
(Netherlands) Tom Egberink (Netherlands) Maarten Ter Hofte	1	0
(United Kingdom) Ben Bartram (Japan) Takuya Miki	4	2
(France) Stéphane Houdet (China) Ji Zhenxu	6	6
(Argentina) Gustavo Fernández (Japan) Tokito Oda	6	6
(Israel) Sergei Lysov (United Kingdom) Andrew Penney	1	2
(Spain) Daniel Caverzaschi (United States) Casey Ratzlaff	1	3
2	(Spain) Martín de la Puente (Netherlands) Ruben Spaargaren	6	6

Semifinals
1	(United Kingdom) Alfie Hewett (United Kingdom) Gordon Reid	6	6
(France) Stéphane Houdet (China) Ji Zhenxu	4	3
(Argentina) Gustavo Fernández (Japan) Tokito Oda	6	6
2	(Spain) Martín de la Puente (Netherlands) Ruben Spaargaren	1	3

Final
1	(United Kingdom) Alfie Hewett (United Kingdom) Gordon Reid	2	6	6
(Argentina) Gustavo Fernández (Japan) Tokito Oda	6	1	2
