= Anna Pushkareva =

Russian tennis player

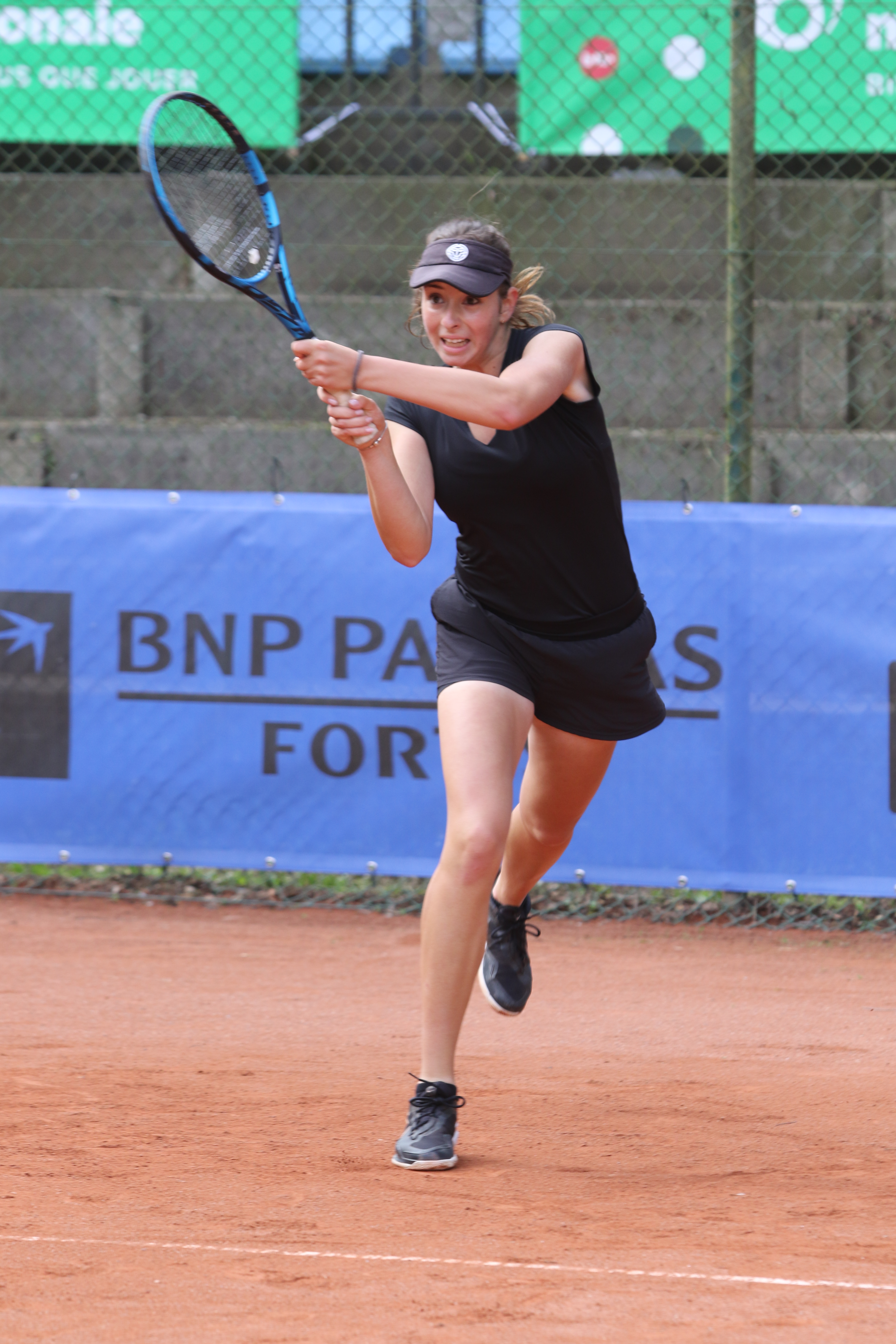
- Pushkareva at the Astrid Bowl, May 2024
- Full name: Anna Nikolayevna Pushkareva
- Native name: Анна Николаевна Пушкарёва
- Country (sports): Russia
- Residence: Moscow, Russia
- Born: 22 April 2009 (age 17) Vladivostok, Russia
- Plays: Right (two-handed backhand)
- Coach: Nikolai Pushkarev; Tatyana Sergeevna Zhukovskaya; Dmitry Vladimirovich Novikov; Georgy Guramovich Salbiev (2025–)
- Prize money: $4,248

Singles
- Career record: 16–8
- Highest ranking: No. 961 (24 August 2026)
- Current ranking: No. 971 (31 August 2026)

Grand Slam singles results
- Australian Open Junior: 3R (2026)
- French Open Junior: 2R (2026)
- Wimbledon Junior: W (2026)
- US Open Junior: F (2026)

Doubles
- Career record: 4–2
- Highest ranking: No. 1,566 (24 August 2026)
- Current ranking: No. 1,571 (31 August 2026)

Grand Slam doubles results
- US Open Junior: QF (2026)
- Last updated on: 12 September 2026.

Anna Nikolayevna Pushkareva (Russian: Анна Николаевна Пушкарёва; born 22 April 2009) is a Russian tennis player. She has a career-high WTA singles ranking of No. 961 and a doubles ranking of No. 1,566, both achieved on 24 August 2026.

On the ITF Junior Circuit, she reached a combined ranking of world No. 5 in July 2026.

== Junior career ==
As a junior player, Pushkareva won the prestigious junior tournament Petits As in France in 2023, having defeated Ksenia Efremova in the semi-final and Giulia Safina Popa in the final.

As a 17 year-old, Pushkareva went beyond the last-16 of a junior Grand Slam for the first time at the 2026 Wimbledon Championships. Following a win against Ukrainian Polina Sklyar in the semi-final, she faced Sun Xinran of China in the final, winning in three sets in 2 hours and 23 minutes, the longest girls' final on record for the tournament. In doing so, she became the first Russian tennis player in 10 years to win the event, following Anastasia Potapova in 2016, and the ninth Wimbledon junior girls' champion from the USSR and Russia. At the 2026 US Open she reached the final of the girls' singles with a win over Jana Kovackova, and faced Sun Xinran in the final for the second consecutive junior slam.

== Professional career ==
Competing on the 2025 ITF Women's World Tennis Tour in Sharm El-Sheikh in November 2025, she was a finalist losing to Chinese player Sun Xinran.

== Personal life ==
From Vladivostok, Pushkareva was coached by her father Nikolai Pushkarev, who as a player was a tennis contemporary of Igor Kunitsyn. The family moved to Moscow in 2019, and she began to train at the Ostrovsky Tennis Academy in Khimki. She worked with coaches Tatyana Sergeevna Zhukovskaya, Dmitry Vladimirovich Novikov, and from November 2025, Georgy Guramovich Salbiev. Ekaterina Makarova has also acted as a consultant.

== ITF Circuit finals ==
=== Singles: 1 (runner-up) ===
Legend W15 tournaments (0–1)	Finals by surface Hard (0–1) Clay (–)

Result	W–L	Date	Tournament	Tier	Surface	Opponent	Score
Loss	0–1	Nov 2025	ITF Sharm El Sheikh, Egypt	W15	Hard	(China) Sun Xinran	1–6, 6–2, 2–6

== Junior Grand Slam tournaments finals ==
=== Singles: 2 (1 title, 1 runner-up) ===
Result	Year	Tournament	Surface	Opponent	Score
Win	2026	Wimbledon	Grass	(China) Sun Xinran	5–7, 6–3, 6–4
Loss	2026	US Open	Hard	(China) Sun Xinran	4–6, 6–4, 0–6
