= 2026 Wimbledon Championships – Mixed invitation doubles =

Tennis championship

Mixed invitation doubles
- 2026 Wimbledon Championships

Final
- Champions: (Germany) Tommy Haas (Switzerland) Martina Hingis
- Runners-up: (Australia) Mark Philippoussis (Zimbabwe) Cara Black
- Score: 6–3, 6–4
- Date: 12 July 2026

Events
Singles	men	women		boys	girls
Doubles	men	women	mixed	boys	girls
WC Singles	men	women	quad
WC Doubles	men	women	quad
14&U Singles	boys	girls
Legends	men	women	mixed
- Wimbledon Championships

Tommy Haas and Martina Hingis won the mixed invitation doubles title at the 2026 Wimbledon Championships, defeating Mark Philippoussis and Cara Black in the final, 6–3, 6–4.

Thomas Johansson and Katie O'Brien were the reigning champions, but O'Brien participated in the ladies' invitation doubles instead. Johansson partnered Barbara Schett, but they were eliminated in the round-robin competition.

== Draw ==
=== Final ===
Final
A1	(Germany) Tommy Haas (Switzerland) Martina Hingis	6	6
B1	(Australia) Mark Philippoussis (Zimbabwe) Cara Black	3	4

=== Group A ===
		(Germany) Haas (Switzerland) Hingis	(France) Santoro (Australia) Stubbs	(Netherlands) Krajicek (United Kingdom) Keothavong	(France) Grosjean (France) Golovin	RR; W–L	Set; W–L	Game; W–L	Standings
A1	(Germany) Tommy Haas (Switzerland) Martina Hingis		6–1, 6–2	6–3, 6–2	6–2, 6–0	3–0	6–0	36–10	1
A2	(France) Fabrice Santoro (Australia) Rennae Stubbs	2–6, 1–6		6–1, 4–6, [10–4]	7–6^{(7–5)}, 4–6, [10–5]	2–1	4–4	26–31	2
A3	(Netherlands) Richard Krajicek (United Kingdom) Anne Keothavong	3–6, 2–6	1–6, 6–4, [4–10]		1–6, 4–6	0–3	0–7	17–35	4
A4	(France) Sébastien Grosjean (France) Tatiana Golovin	2–6, 0–6	6–7^{(5–7)}, 6–4, [5–10]	6–1, 6–4		1–2	3–4	26–29	3

=== Group B ===
		(Australia) Philippoussis (Zimbabwe) Black	(Iran) Bahrami (Croatia) Majoli	(United Kingdom) Rusedski (United Kingdom) Konta	(Sweden) Johansson (Austria) Schett	RR; W–L	Set; W–L	Game; W–L	Standings
B1	(Australia) Mark Philippoussis (Zimbabwe) Cara Black		6–3, 7–6^{(7–3)}	6–3, 6–3	6–4, 6–4	3–0	6–0	37–23	1
B2	(Iran) Mansour Bahrami (Croatia) Iva Majoli	3–6, 6–7^{(3–7)}		6–4, 6–4	5–7, 6–7^{(2–7)}	1–2	2–4	32–35	3
B3	(United Kingdom) Greg Rusedski (United Kingdom) Johanna Konta	3–6, 3–6	4–6, 4–6		6–3, 3–6, [9–11]	0–3	1–6	23–34	4
B4	(Sweden) Thomas Johansson (Austria) Barbara Schett	4–6, 4–6	7–5, 7–6^{(7–2)}	3–6, 6–3, [11–9]		2–1	4–3	32–32	2
