= 2026 Wimbledon Championships – Ladies' invitation doubles =

Tennis championship

Ladies' invitation doubles
- 2026 Wimbledon Championships

Final
- Champions: (Slovakia) Magdaléna Rybáriková (Czech Republic) Lucie Šafářová
- Runners-up: (Slovakia) Dominika Cibulková (Czech Republic) Barbora Strýcová
- Score: 6–2, 6–3
- Date: 12 July 2026

Events
| Singles | men | women | | boys | girls |
| Doubles | men | women | mixed | boys | girls |
| WC Singles | men | women | quad |
| WC Doubles | men | women | quad |
| 14&U Singles | boys | girls |
| Legends | men | women | mixed |
- Wimbledon Championships

Magdaléna Rybáriková and Lucie Šafářová won the ladies' invitation doubles title at the 2026 Wimbledon Championships, defeating Dominika Cibulková and Barbora Strýcová in the final, 6–2, 6–3.

Cara Black and Martina Hingis were the reigning champions, but participated separately in the mixed invitation doubles instead this year.

== Draw ==
=== Final ===
| Final |
| A1 | (Slovakia) Dominika Cibulková (Czech Republic) Barbora Strýcová | 2 | 3 |
| B2 | (Slovakia) Magdaléna Rybáriková (Czech Republic) Lucie Šafářová | 6 | 6 |

=== Group A ===
| | | (Slovakia) Cibulková (Czech Republic) Strýcová | (Canada) Bouchard (Estonia) Kontaveit | (Germany) Lisicki (United Kingdom) O'Brien | (United States) King (Kazakhstan) Shvedova | RR; W–L | Set; W–L | Game; W–L | Standings |
| A1 | (Slovakia) Dominika Cibulková (Czech Republic) Barbora Strýcová | | 2–6, 6–4, [10–6] | 7–6^{(7–2)}, 6–3 | 6–4, 0–6, [10–4] | 3–0 | 6–2 | 29–29 | 1 |
| A2 | (Canada) Eugenie Bouchard (Estonia) Anett Kontaveit | 6–2, 4–6, [6–10] | | 6–4, 6–7^{(6–8)}, [8–10] | 6–2, 6–4 | 1–2 | 4–4 | 34–27 | 3 |
| A3 | (Germany) Sabine Lisicki (United Kingdom) Katie O'Brien | 6–7^{(2–7)}, 3–6 | 4–6, 7–6^{(8–6)}, [10–8] | | 7–5, 6–3 | 2–1 | 4–3 | 34–33 | 2 |
| A4 | (United States) Vania King (Kazakhstan) Yaroslava Shvedova | 4–6, 6–0, [4–10] | 2–6, 4–6 | 5–7, 3–6 | | 0–3 | 1–6 | 24–32 | 4 |

=== Group B ===
| | | (Poland) Radwańska (Denmark) Wozniacki | (Slovakia) Rybáriková (Czech Republic) Šafářová | (Belgium) Flipkens (Slovakia) Hantuchová | (Germany) Kerber (Germany) Petkovic | RR; W–L | Set; W–L | Game; W–L | Standings |
| B1 | (Poland) Agnieszka Radwańska (Denmark) Caroline Wozniacki | | 5–7, 2–6 | 6–7^{(5–7)}, 3–6 | 7–5, 6–3 | 1–2 | 2–4 | 29–34 | 3 |
| B2 | (Slovakia) Magdaléna Rybáriková (Czech Republic) Lucie Šafářová | 7–5, 6–2 | | 6–7^{(3–7)}, 6–3, [10–5] | 6–2, 6–4 | 3–0 | 6–1 | 38–23 | 1 |
| B3 | (Belgium) Kirsten Flipkens (Slovakia) Daniela Hantuchová | 7–6^{(7–5)}, 6–3 | 7–6^{(7–3)}, 3–6, [5–10] | | 6–7^{(7–9)}, 2-6 | 1–2 | 3–4 | 31–35 | 2 |
| B4 | (Germany) Angelique Kerber (Germany) Andrea Petkovic | 5–7, 3–6 | 2–6, 4–6 | 7–6^{(9–7)}, 6–2 | | 1–2 | 2–4 | 27–33 | 4 |
