= 2026 Wimbledon Championships – Boys' doubles =

Tennis championship

Boys' doubles
- 2026 Wimbledon Championships

Final
- Champions: (Brazil) Luís Guto Miguel (Slovenia) Žiga Šeško
- Runners-up: (United States) Michael Antonius (United States) Andrew Johnson
- Score: 6–1, 6–4
- Date: 11 July 2026

Details
- Draw: 32
- Seeds: 8

Events
Singles	men	women		boys	girls
Doubles	men	women	mixed	boys	girls
WC Singles	men	women	quad
WC Doubles	men	women	quad
14&U Singles	boys	girls
Legends	men	women	mixed
- Wimbledon Championships

Luís Guto Miguel and Žiga Šeško won the boys' doubles title at the 2026 Wimbledon Championships, defeating Michael Antonius and Andrew Johnson in the final, 6–1, 6–4.

Oskari Paldanius and Alan Ważny were the reigning champions, but were no longer eligible to compete in junior events.

== Seeds ==
1. (Brazil) Luís Guto Miguel / (Slovenia) Žiga Šeško (champions)
2. (United States) Michael Antonius / (United States) Andrew Johnson (final)
3. (Austria) Thilo Behrmann / (Switzerland) Flynn Thomas (first round)
4. (Germany) Jamie Mackenzie / (Germany) Vincent Reisach (first round)
5. (Puerto Rico) Yannik Álvarez / (Brazil) Leonardo Storck França (first round)
6. (France) Yannick Theodor Alexandrescou / (Japan) Ryo Tabata (quarterfinals)
7. (Peru) Nicolás Baena / (Spain) Tito Chávez (first round)
8. (France) Mathys Domenc / (France) Daniel Jade (quarterfinals)

== Draw ==
Key

- Q = Qualifier
- WC = Wild card
- LL = Lucky loser
- Alt = Alternate
- ITF = ITF entry
- PR = Protected ranking
- SR = Special ranking
- SE = Special exempt
- JE = Junior exempt
- JR = Junior Accelerator Programme entrant
- CO = College Accelerator Programme entrant
- NG = Next Gen Accelerator Program entrant
- w/o = Walkover
- r = Retired
- d = Defaulted

=== Finals ===
Semifinals
1	(Brazil) Luís Guto Miguel (Slovenia) Žiga Šeško	6	6^{6}	[10]
(Nigeria) Oluwaseun Peter Ogunsakin (Botswana) Ntungamili Raguin	3	7^{8}	[6]
(Italy) Raffaele Ciurnelli (Slovakia) Leon Sloboda	6^{4}	5
2	(United States) Michael Antonius (United States) Andrew Johnson	7^{7}	7

Final
1	(Brazil) Luís Guto Miguel (Slovenia) Žiga Šeško	6	6
2	(United States) Michael Antonius (United States) Andrew Johnson	1	4

=== Top half ===
First round
1	(Brazil) Luís Guto Miguel (Slovenia) Žiga Šeško	7^{7}	7
(Czech Republic) Jakub Kusý (Hong Kong) Kai Thompson	6^{5}	5
WC	(United Kingdom) Liam Channon (United Kingdom) William Moxon	6^{4}	7	[8]
(Thailand) Kunanan Pantaratorn (India) Arnav Vijay Paparkar	7^{7}	5	[10]
(Latvia) Rihards Neimanis (Romania) Matei Todoran	6	7^{7}
(Ecuador) Emilio Camacho (Chinese Taipei) Chen Kuan-shou	1	6^{0}
(United States) Jack Secord (Kazakhstan) Damir Zhalgasbay	7^{10}	7^{8}
5	(Puerto Rico) Yannik Álvarez (Brazil) Leonardo Storck França	6^{8}	6^{6}
3	(Austria) Thilo Behrmann (Switzerland) Flynn Thomas	3	6^{1}
(Nigeria) Oluwaseun Peter Ogunsakin (Botswana) Ntungamili Raguin	6	7^{7}
(United States) Safir Azam (United States) Vihaan Reddy	6	7^{7}
(Italy) Matteo Gribaldo (Italy) Simone Massellani	3	6^{3}
(United Kingdom) Rhys Lawlor (United States) Jordan Lee	6	5	[11]
(France) Aaron Gabet; Savva Rybkin	4	7	[9]
WC	(United Kingdom) Vincent Fletcher (United Kingdom) Alex Mirrington	6^{4}	3
6	(France) Yannick Theodor Alexandrescou (Japan) Ryo Tabata	7^{7}	6

Second round
1	(Brazil) LG Miguel (Slovenia) Ž Šeško	3	7	[18]
(Thailand) K Pantaratorn (India) AV Paparkar	6	5	[16]
(Latvia) R Neimanis (Romania) M Todoran	6	4	[10]
(United States) J Secord (Kazakhstan) D Zhalgasbay	4	6	[8]
(Nigeria) OP Ogunsakin (Botswana) N Raguin	6	4	[10]
(United States) S Azam (United States) V Reddy	1	6	[1]
(United Kingdom) R Lawlor (United States) J Lee
6	(France) YT Alexandrescou (Japan) R Tabata	w/o

Quarterfinals
1	(Brazil) LG Miguel (Slovenia) Ž Šeško	6	7^{7}
(Latvia) R Neimanis (Romania) M Todoran	3	6^{3}
(Nigeria) OP Ogunsakin (Botswana) N Raguin	6	7^{7}
6	(France) YT Alexandrescou (Japan) R Tabata	4	6^{4}

Semifinals
1	(Brazil) LG Miguel (Slovenia) Ž Šeško	6	6^{6}	[10]
(Nigeria) OP Ogunsakin (Botswana) N Raguin	3	7^{8}	[6]

=== Bottom half ===
First round
8	(France) Mathys Domenc (France) Daniel Jade	6	6
WC	(United Kingdom) Joshua Craze (United Kingdom) Oliver Page	3	1
(Australia) Jake Dembo (Australia) Daniel Jovanovski	3	6	[8]
(Spain) Valentín González-Galiño (United States) Tanishk Konduri	6	2	[10]
(Italy) Raffaele Ciurnelli (Slovakia) Leon Sloboda	7^{7}	6^{3}	[10]
(Spain) Eudald González (Slovenia) Svit Suljić	6^{4}	7^{7}	[8]
(United States) Ryan Cozad (United States) Gavin Goode	6^{6}	7^{7}	[13]
4	(Germany) Jamie Mackenzie (Germany) Vincent Reisach	7^{8}	6^{5}	[11]
7	(Peru) Nicolás Baena (Spain) Tito Chávez	5	6^{2}
(Colombia) Juan Miguel Bolívar Idárraga (Argentina) Dante Pagani	7	7^{7}
(Japan) Hyu Kawanishi (Japan) Kanta Watanabe	3	6	[16]
(South Africa) Connor Doig (Bulgaria) Dimitar Kisimov	6	3	[14]
(Israel) Dan Brand (Brazil) Pedro Henrique Chabalgoity	7^{7}	6
(Uzbekistan) Nikita Belozertsev (United Kingdom) Mark Ceban	6^{4}	1
WC	(United Kingdom) Archie Gray (United Kingdom) Harrison McElnea	2	1
2	(United States) Michael Antonius (United States) Andrew Johnson	6	6

Second round
8	(France) M Domenc (France) D Jade	6	6
(Spain) V González-Galiño (United States) T Konduri	3	0
(Italy) R Ciurnelli (Slovakia) L Sloboda	7^{7}	7^{7}
(United States) R Cozad (United States) G Goode	6^{3}	6^{4}
(Colombia) JM Bolívar Idárraga (Argentina) D Pagani	4	3
(Japan) H Kawanishi (Japan) K Watanabe	6	6
(Israel) D Brand (Brazil) PH Chabalgoity	6^{4}	2
2	(United States) M Antonius (United States) A Johnson	7^{7}	6

Quarterfinals
8	(France) M Domenc (France) D Jade	6	3	[5]
(Italy) R Ciurnelli (Slovakia) L Sloboda	4	6	[10]
(Japan) H Kawanishi (Japan) K Watanabe	4	2
2	(United States) M Antonius (United States) A Johnson	6	6

Semifinals
(Italy) R Ciurnelli (Slovakia) L Sloboda	6^{4}	5
2	(United States) M Antonius (United States) A Johnson	7^{7}	7
