= 2026 Wimbledon Championships – Wheelchair quad doubles =

Tennis championship

Wheelchair quad doubles
- 2026 Wimbledon Championships

Final
- Champions: (Israel) Guy Sasson (Netherlands) Niels Vink
- Runners-up: (Netherlands) Sam Schröder (Australia) Jin Woodman
- Score: 6–2, 6–1
- Date: 11 July 2026

Details
- Draw: 4
- Seeds: 2

Events
Singles	men	women		boys	girls
Doubles	men	women	mixed	boys	girls
WC Singles	men	women	quad
WC Doubles	men	women	quad
14&U Singles	boys	girls
Legends	men	women	mixed
- Wimbledon Championships

Defending champions Guy Sasson and Niels Vink defeated Sam Schröder and Jin Woodman in the final, 6–2, 6–1 to win the quad doubles wheelchair tennis title at the 2026 Wimbledon Championships.

== Seeds ==
1. (Israel) Guy Sasson / (Netherlands) Niels Vink (champions)
2. (Netherlands) Sam Schröder / (Australia) Jin Woodman (final)

== Draw ==
Key

- Q = Qualifier
- WC = Wild card
- LL = Lucky loser
- Alt = Alternate
- ITF = ITF entry
- PR = Protected ranking
- SR = Special ranking
- SE = Special exempt
- JE = Junior exempt
- JR = Junior Accelerator Programme entrant
- CO = College Accelerator Programme entrant
- NG = Next Gen Accelerator Program entrant
- w/o = Walkover
- r = Retired
- d = Defaulted

=== Finals ===
Semifinals
1	(Israel) Guy Sasson (Netherlands) Niels Vink	6	6
(Turkey) Ahmet Kaplan (Argentina) Gonzalo Enrique Lazarte	1	1
(United Kingdom) Andy Lapthorne (United Kingdom) Gregory Slade	4	1
2	(Netherlands) Sam Schröder (Australia) Jin Woodman	6	6

Final
1	(Israel) Guy Sasson (Netherlands) Niels Vink	6	6
2	(Netherlands) Sam Schröder (Australia) Jin Woodman	2	1
