= 2026 Wimbledon Championships – Boys' singles =

Tennis championship

Boys' singles
- 2026 Wimbledon Championships

Final
- Champion: (United States) Jordan Lee
- Runner-up: (Australia) Cruz Hewitt
- Score: 4–6, 6–4, 7–5
- Date: 12 July 2026

Details
- Draw: 64 (8Q / 8WC)
- Seeds: 16

Events
Singles	men	women		boys	girls
Doubles	men	women	mixed	boys	girls
WC Singles	men	women	quad
WC Doubles	men	women	quad
14&U Singles	boys	girls
Legends	men	women	mixed
- Wimbledon Championships

Jordan Lee won the boys' singles title at the 2026 Wimbledon Championships, defeating Cruz Hewitt in the final, 4–6, 6–4, 7–5. Lee was the first qualifier to win the boys' singles title since Noah Rubin in 2014. He was also the first person born in the 2010s to win the boys' title.

Ivan Ivanov was the reigning champion, but chose not to compete this year. He received a wildcard into the men's singles qualifying competition, where he lost in the first round to Zsombor Piros.

By qualifying for the main draw, Oluwaseun Peter Ogunsakin became the first Nigerian junior player to qualify for the main event of a junior Grand Slam tournament.

== Seeds ==
1. (Brazil) Luís Guto Miguel (second round)
2. (Germany) Jamie Mackenzie (third round)
3. (United States) Keaton Hance (second round)
4. (Slovenia) Žiga Šeško (second round)
5. (France) Yannick Theodor Alexandrescou (first round)
6. (United States) Michael Antonius (first round)
7. (Austria) Thilo Behrmann (first round)
8. (Kazakhstan) Zangar Nurlanuly (third round)
9. (Bulgaria) Dimitar Kisimov (quarterfinals)
10. (Puerto Rico) Yannik Álvarez (first round)
11. (Netherlands) Thijs Boogaard (semifinals)
12. (United States) Andrew Johnson (second round)
13. (Peru) Nicolás Baena (second round)
14. (France) Mathys Domenc (second round)
15. (Chinese Taipei) Chen Kuan-shou (third round)
16. (Argentina) Dante Pagani (third round)

Click on the seed number of a player to go to their draw section.

== Draw ==
Key

- Q = Qualifier
- WC = Wild card
- LL = Lucky loser
- Alt = Alternate
- ITF = ITF entry
- PR = Protected ranking
- SR = Special ranking
- SE = Special exempt
- JE = Junior exempt
- JR = Junior Accelerator Programme entrant
- CO = College Accelerator Programme entrant
- NG = Next Gen Accelerator Program entrant
- w/o = Walkover
- r = Retired
- d = Defaulted

=== Finals ===
Quarterfinals
(United States) Jack Secord	3	3
(Germany) Vincent Reisach	6	6
(India) Arnav Vijay Paparkar	2	5
Q	(United States) Jordan Lee	6	7
11	(Netherlands) Thijs Boogaard	6	6
WC	(United Kingdom) Oliver Page	3	1
9	(Bulgaria) Dimitar Kisimov	1	2
(Australia) Cruz Hewitt	6	6

Semifinals
(Germany) Vincent Reisach	3	2
Q	(United States) Jordan Lee	6	6
11	(Netherlands) Thijs Boogaard	4	4
(Australia) Cruz Hewitt	6	6

Final
Q	(United States) Jordan Lee	4	6	7
(Australia) Cruz Hewitt	6	4	5

=== Top half ===
==== Section 1 ====
First round
1	(Brazil) Luís Guto Miguel	6	6
WC	(United Kingdom) Vincent Fletcher	3	2
(Italy) Matteo Gribaldo	5	2
(United States) Jack Secord	7	6
Q	Savva Rybkin	6	6
(Japan) Kanta Watanabe	3	4
WC	(United Kingdom) William Moxon	3	2
16	(Argentina) Dante Pagani	6	6
12	(United States) Andrew Johnson	6	6
(Romania) Matei Todoran	4	4
(Germany) Vincent Reisach	6	7^{7}
(Colombia) Juan Miguel Bolívar Idárraga	2	6^{4}
(Australia) Daniel Jovanovski	6	6
WC	(United Kingdom) Isaac Sallu	4	2
(Slovakia) Leon Sloboda	6	6^{3}	6^{2}
8	(Kazakhstan) Zangar Nurlanuly	3	7^{7}	7^{10}

Second round
1	(Brazil) LG Miguel	7	1	4
(United States) J Secord	5	6	6
Q	S Rybkin	3	6	4
16	(Argentina) D Pagani	6	3	6
12	(United States) A Johnson	6^{3}	7^{7}	6^{5}
(Germany) V Reisach	7^{7}	6^{4}	7^{10}
(Australia) D Jovanovski	1	1
8	(Kazakhstan) Z Nurlanuly	6	6

Third round
(United States) J Secord	6	7^{13}
16	(Argentina) D Pagani	4	6^{11}
(Germany) V Reisach	6	7^{7}
8	(Kazakhstan) Z Nurlanuly	3	6^{3}

Quarterfinals
(United States) J Secord	3	3
(Germany) V Reisach	6	6

==== Section 2 ====
First round
3	(United States) Keaton Hance	6	3	7^{10}
(Italy) Simone Massellani	4	6	6^{7}
(India) Arnav Vijay Paparkar	6	6
WC	(United Kingdom) Joshua Craze	2	2
(Japan) Ryo Tabata	6	5	7^{11}
(Czech Republic) Jakub Kusy	2	7	6^{9}
(Hong Kong) Kai Thompson	6^{2}	3
13	(Peru) Nicolás Baena	7^{7}	6
10	(Puerto Rico) Yannik Álvarez	7^{7}	2	6^{10}
(United States) Tanishk Konduri	6^{2}	6	7^{12}
SE	(Slovenia) Svit Suljić	6	6
Q	(United States) Safir Azam	3	2
(Spain) Tito Chávez	6	6
WC	(United Kingdom) Alex Mirrington	2	0
Q	(United States) Jordan Lee	6	6
5	(France) Yannick Theodor Alexandrescou	0	2

Second round
3	(United States) K Hance	2	3
(India) AV Paparkar	6	6
(Japan) R Tabata	6	6
13	(Peru) N Baena	3	1
(United States) T Konduri	6	7^{7}
SE	(Slovenia) S Suljić	2	6^{4}
(Spain) T Chávez	3	3
Q	(United States) J Lee	6	6

Third round
(India) AV Paparkar	6	6
(Japan) R Tabata	2	1
(United States) T Konduri	4	7^{7}	3
Q	(United States) J Lee	6	6^{4}	6

Quarterfinals
(India) AV Paparkar	2	5
Q	(United States) J Lee	6	7

=== Bottom half ===
==== Section 3 ====
First round
6	(United States) Michael Antonius	2	6	3
WC	(United Kingdom) Rhys Lawlor	6	3	6
(Switzerland) Flynn Thomas	6	6
Q	(Latvia) Rihards Neimanis	2	2
(Japan) Hyu Kawanishi	3	0
(France) Daniel Jade	6	6
(Brazil) Pedro Henrique Chabalgoity	4	2
11	(Netherlands) Thijs Boogaard	6	6
15	(Chinese Taipei) Chen Kuan-shou	3	6	6
(Uzbekistan) Nikita Belozertsev	6	2	3
(Israel) Dan Brand	6	6
(United States) Ryan Cozad	3	2
WC	(United Kingdom) Oliver Page	6	3	7
Q	(Nigeria) Oluwaseun Peter Ogunsakin	3	6	5
Q	(United States) Vihaan Reddy	4	4
4	(Slovenia) Žiga Šeško	6	6

Second round
WC	(United Kingdom) R Lawlor	7	6
(Switzerland) F Thomas	5	2
(France) D Jade	6^{1}	2
11	(Netherlands) T Boogaard	7^{7}	6
15	(Chinese Taipei) K-s Chen	7	3	7^{10}
(Israel) D Brand	5	6	6^{7}
WC	(United Kingdom) O Page	6	6
4	(Slovenia) Ž Šeško	4	4

Third round
WC	(United Kingdom) R Lawlor	6	1	4
11	(Netherlands) T Boogaard	4	6	6
15	(Chinese Taipei) K-s Chen	3	4
WC	(United Kingdom) O Page	6	6

Quarterfinals
11	(Netherlands) T Boogaard	6	6
WC	(United Kingdom) O Page	3	1

==== Section 4 ====
First round
7	(Austria) Thilo Behrmann	6	6^{3}	6^{8}
(Kazakhstan) Damir Zhalgasbay	3	7^{7}	7^{10}
(South Africa) Connor Doig	7^{7}	6
Q	(Spain) Eudald González	6^{5}	3
WC	(United Kingdom) Liam Channon	6	7^{9}
Q	(Australia) Mustafa Ege Şık	4	6^{7}
(Italy) Raffaele Ciurnelli	3	5
9	(Bulgaria) Dimitar Kisimov	6	7
14	(France) Mathys Domenc	1	6	6
(Ecuador) Emilio Camacho	6	3	3
(Spain) Valentín González-Galiño	1	2
(Australia) Cruz Hewitt	6	6
(United Kingdom) Mark Ceban	7	4	7
(United States) Gavin Goode	5	6	5
(Brazil) Leonardo Storck França	3	1
2	(Germany) Jamie Mackenzie	6	6

Second round
(Kazakhstan) D Zhalgasbay	6	6^{3}	6^{8}
(South Africa) C Doig	4	7^{7}	7^{10}
WC	(United Kingdom) L Channon	6^{3}	4
9	(Bulgaria) D Kisimov	7^{7}	6
14	(France) M Domenc	6^{4}	2
(Australia) C Hewitt	7^{7}	6
(United Kingdom) M Ceban	6^{3}	6	4
2	(Germany) J Mackenzie	7^{7}	3	6

Third round
(South Africa) C Doig	6	3	6^{5}
9	(Bulgaria) D Kisimov	4	6	7^{10}
(Australia) C Hewitt	6	6
2	(Germany) J Mackenzie	3	4

Quarterfinals
9	(Bulgaria) D Kisimov	1	2
(Australia) C Hewitt	6	6

== Qualifying ==
=== Seeds ===
1. (United States) Vihaan Reddy (qualified)
2. Savva Rybkin (qualified)
3. (Poland) Jan Sadzik (qualifying competition)
4. (Italy) Filippo Alfano (qualifying competition)
5. (United States) Safir Azam (qualified)
6. (Latvia) Rihards Neimanis (qualified)
7. (United States) Jordan Lee (qualified)
8. (Canada) Benjamin Azar (qualifying competition)
9. (Thailand) Kunanan Pantaratorn (qualifying competition)
10. (Spain) Eudald González (qualified)
11. (South Africa) John Bothma (first round)
12. (Botswana) Ntungamili Raguin (first round)
13. (Spain) Maxi Carrascosa Díaz (qualifying competition)
14. (Australia) Mustafa Ege Şık (qualified)
15. (Canada) Xavier Massotte (first round)
16. (Nigeria) Oluwaseun Peter Ogunsakin (qualified)

=== Qualifiers ===
1. (United States) Vihaan Reddy
2. Savva Rybkin
3. (Spain) Eudald González
4. (Australia) Mustafa Ege Şık
5. (United States) Safir Azam
6. (Latvia) Rihards Neimanis
7. (United States) Jordan Lee
8. (Nigeria) Oluwaseun Peter Ogunsakin

=== Qualifying draw ===
==== First qualifier ====
First round
1	(United States) Vihaan Reddy	7^{7}	6
(Poland) Aleksander Błuś	6^{2}	4
(Japan) Takahiro Kawaguchi	7	6
11	(South Africa) John Bothma	5	1

Qualifying competition
1	(United States) Vihaan Reddy	6^{2}	7^{7}	[10]
(Japan) Takahiro Kawaguchi	7^{7}	6^{5}	[7]

==== Second qualifier ====
First round
2	Savva Rybkin	6	6^{5}	[11]
(United States) Marcel Latak	1	7^{7}	[9]
WC	(United Kingdom) Harrison McElnea	7^{7}	6
15	(Canada) Xavier Massotte	6^{1}	2

Qualifying competition
2	Savva Rybkin	7	6
WC	(United Kingdom) Harrison McElnea	5	1

==== Third qualifier ====
First round
3	(Poland) Jan Sadzik	6	7
WC	(United Kingdom) Neo Armus	4	5
(Romania) Matei Victor Chelemen	5	4
10	(Spain) Eudald González	7	6

Qualifying competition
3	(Poland) Jan Sadzik	7^{7}	4	[6]
10	(Spain) Eudald González	6^{4}	6	[10]

==== Fourth qualifier ====
First round
4	(Italy) Filippo Alfano	6	6
WC	(United Kingdom) Jesse Clarkson	1	2
Alt	(United States) Agassi Rusher	3	4
14	(Australia) Mustafa Ege Şık	6	6

Qualifying competition
4	(Italy) Filippo Alfano	4	6^{5}
14	(Australia) Mustafa Ege Şık	6	7^{7}

==== Fifth qualifier ====
First round
5	(United States) Safir Azam	6	2	[10]
(Australia) Jake Dembo	2	6	[3]
WC	(United Kingdom) Jaydan Mitchell	3	2
9	(Thailand) Kunanan Pantaratorn	6	6

Qualifying competition
5	(United States) Safir Azam	7^{7}	6
9	(Thailand) Kunanan Pantaratorn	6^{4}	3

==== Sixth qualifier ====
First round
6	(Latvia) Rihards Neimanis	6	3	[10]
(France) Aaron Gabet	3	6	[6]
(Canada) Felix Roussel	6	6
12	(Botswana) Ntungamili Raguin	4	2

Qualifying competition
6	(Latvia) Rihards Neimanis	7^{7}	6
(Canada) Felix Roussel	6^{3}	4

==== Seventh qualifier ====
First round
7	(United States) Jordan Lee	6	6
WC	(United Kingdom) Casey Drake	2	1
Marat Salbiev	6^{2}	4
13	(Spain) Maxi Carrascosa Díaz	7^{7}	6

Qualifying competition
7	(United States) Jordan Lee	6	6
13	(Spain) Maxi Carrascosa Díaz	1	4

==== Eighth qualifier ====
First round
8	(Canada) Benjamin Azar	6^{5}	7	[10]
(Greece) Odysseas Geladaris	7^{7}	5	[8]
WC	(United Kingdom) Archie Gray	3	4
16	(Nigeria) Oluwaseun Peter Ogunsakin	6	6

Qualifying competition
8	(Canada) Benjamin Azar	3	1
16	(Nigeria) Oluwaseun Peter Ogunsakin	6	6
