= 2026 Wimbledon Championships – Gentlemen's invitation doubles =

Tennis championship

Gentlemen's invitation doubles
- 2026 Wimbledon Championships

Final
- Champions: (United States) Bob Bryan (United States) Mike Bryan
- Runners-up: (United Kingdom) Jamie Murray (Brazil) Bruno Soares
- Score: 6–4, 7–6^{(7–1)}
- Date: 12 July 2026

Events
Singles	men	women		boys	girls
Doubles	men	women	mixed	boys	girls
WC Singles	men	women	quad
WC Doubles	men	women	quad
14&U Singles	boys	girls
Legends	men	women	mixed
- Wimbledon Championships

Defending champions Bob and Mike Bryan defeated Jamie Murray and Bruno Soares in the final, 6–4, 7–6^{(7–1)} to win the gentlemen's invitation doubles title at the 2026 Wimbledon Championships.

== Draw ==
=== Final ===
Final
A1	(United Kingdom) Jamie Murray (Brazil) Bruno Soares	4	6^{1}
B1	(United States) Bob Bryan (United States) Mike Bryan	6	7^{7}

=== Group A ===
		(United Kingdom) Murray (Brazil) Soares	(France) Chardy/ (Spain) Lopez (United Kingdom) Delgado	(Colombia) Cabal (Colombia) Farah	(Cyprus) Baghdatis (Belgium) Malisse	RR; W–L	Set; W–L	Game; W–L	Standings
A1	(United Kingdom) Jamie Murray (Brazil) Bruno Soares		7–5, 7–6^{(7–4)}	7–5, 7–5	6–3, 3–6, [10–7]	3–0	6–1	38–30	1
A2	(France) Jérémy Chardy/ (Spain) Feliciano Lopez (United Kingdom) Jamie Delgado	5–7, 6–7^{(4–7)}		4-6, 4-6	4–6, 4–6	0–3	0–6	27–38	4
A3	(Colombia) Juan Sebastián Cabal (Colombia) Robert Farah	5–7, 5–7	6-4, 6-4		7–6^{(7–4)}, 6–4	2–1	4–2	35–32	2
A4	(Cyprus) Marcos Baghdatis (Belgium) Xavier Malisse	3–6, 6–3, [7–10]	6–4, 6–4	6–7^{(4–7)}, 4–6		1–2	3–4	31–31	3

=== Group B ===
		(United States) Bryan (United States) Bryan	(Italy) Fognini (Australia) Hewitt	(Sweden) Lindstedt (Romania) Tecău	(United States) Blake (United Kingdom) Edmund	RR; W–L	Set; W–L	Game; W–L	Standings
B1	(United States) Bob Bryan (United States) Mike Bryan		6–3, 3–6, [20–18]	6–3, 6–3	6–1, 6–2	3–0	6–1	34–18	1
B2	(Italy) Fabio Fognini (Australia) Lleyton Hewitt	3–6, 6–3, [18–20]		6–3, 7–6^{(7–4)}	6–3, 6–2	2–1	5–2	34–24	2
B3	(Sweden) Robert Lindstedt (Romania) Horia Tecău	3–6, 3–6	3–6, 6–7^{(4–7)}		7–5, 6–7^{(2–7)}, [8–10]	0–3	1–6	28–38	4
B4	(United States) James Blake (United Kingdom) Kyle Edmund	1–6, 2–6	3–6, 2–6	5–7, 7–6^{(7–2)}, [10–8]		1–2	2–5	21–37	3
