= Giulia Safina Popa =

Romanian tennis player (born 2009)

- Country (sports): Romania
- Born: 9 November 2009 (age 16) Oradea, Romania
- Plays: Left-handed (two-handed backhand)
- Coach: Lucian Popa
- Prize money: $9,041

Singles
- Career record: 20–12
- Highest ranking: No. 757 (13 October 2025)
- Current ranking: No. 867 (8 September 2025)

Grand Slam singles results
- French Open Junior: 2R (2025, 2026)
- Wimbledon Junior: 1R (2025, 2026)

Doubles
- Career record: 1–5

Grand Slam doubles results
- French Open Junior: 1R (2025, 2026)
- Wimbledon Junior: 2R (2026)
- Last updated on: 8 September 2025.

Giulia Safina Popa (born 9 November 2009) is a Romanian tennis player. She has a career-high ITF junior combined ranking of No. 35, achieved on 10 February 2025.

== Early life ==
Popa was born in Oradea. She grew up in a tennis family, having been named after Dinara Safina, and began playing the sport at the age of six. She is coached by her father, Lucian Popa, and is registered at CSM Oradea.

== Junior career ==
In January 2023, Popa finished runner-up at the Petits As. Later that year, she won silver medals in both singles and doubles at the European Youth Summer Olympic Festival.

In September 2024, she and Maia Ilinca Burcescu were runners-up in doubles at the U16 European Junior Championships. Later that year, she represented Romania at the Junior Billie Jean King Cup, where she reached the finals with Burcescu and Ioana-Ștefania Boian.

In January 2025, she won the J300 Mundial Juvenil de Tenis in Salinas, defeating Kali Šupová in the final.

== Professional career ==
In July 2025, Popa made her WTA Tour debut after qualifying for the main draw of the Iași Open.

== ITF Circuit finals ==
=== Singles: 6 (4 title, 2 runner-up) ===
Legend W15 tournaments (4–2)	Finals by surface Clay (4–2)

Result	W–L	Date	Tournament	Tier	Surface	Opponent	Score
Loss	0–1	Sep 2025	ITF Kuršumlijska Banja, Serbia	W15	Clay	(Serbia) Natalija Senić	1–6, 1–6
Win	1–1	Jun 2026	ITF Galați, Romania	W15	Clay	(Italy) Chiara Fornasieri	6–4, 6–3
Win	2–1	Sep 2026	ITF Câmpulung, Romania	W15	Clay	(Hungary) Melinda Bíró	4–6, 6–2, 6–3
Win	3–1	Sep 2026	ITF Constanta, Romania	W15	Clay	(Romania) Alesia Breaz	6-3, 6-1
Win	4–1	Sep 2026	ITF Varna, Bulgaria	W15	Clay	(Germany) Sonja Zhenikhova	6–2, 6–3
Loss	4–2	Oct 2026	ITF Chișinău, Moldova	W15	Clay	Felitsata Dorofeeva-Rybas	2–6, 2–6
