= 2026 Wimbledon Championships – Wheelchair men's singles =

Tennis championship

Wheelchair men's singles
- 2026 Wimbledon Championships

Final
- Champion: (Japan) Tokito Oda
- Runner-up: (United Kingdom) Alfie Hewett
- Score: 6–1, 6–1
- Date: 12 July 2026

Details
- Draw: 16
- Seeds: 4

Events
Singles	men	women		boys	girls
Doubles	men	women	mixed	boys	girls
WC Singles	men	women	quad
WC Doubles	men	women	quad
14&U Singles	boys	girls
Legends	men	women	mixed
- Wimbledon Championships

Defending champion Tokito Oda defeated Alfie Hewett in a rematch of the previous year's final, 6–1, 6–1 to win the gentlemen's singles wheelchair tennis title at the 2026 Wimbledon Championships. It was his third Wimbledon singles title and tenth major singles title overall.

== Seeds ==
1. (Japan) Tokito Oda (champion)
2. (United Kingdom) Alfie Hewett (final)
3. (Spain) Martin de la Puente (semifinals)
4. (Argentina) Gustavo Fernández (semifinals)

== Draw ==
Key

- Q = Qualifier
- WC = Wild card
- LL = Lucky loser
- Alt = Alternate
- ITF = ITF entry
- PR = Protected ranking
- SR = Special ranking
- SE = Special exempt
- JE = Junior exempt
- JR = Junior Accelerator Programme entrant
- CO = College Accelerator Programme entrant
- NG = Next Gen Accelerator Program entrant
- w/o = Walkover
- r = Retired
- d = Defaulted

=== Finals ===
First round
1	(Japan) Tokito Oda	6	6
(United Kingdom) Gordon Reid	3	1
WC	(United Kingdom) Ben Bartram	4	4
(Japan) Takuya Miki	6	6
3	(Spain) Martín de la Puente	6	6
(Netherlands) Ruben Spaargaren	2	0
WC	(United Kingdom) Andrew Penney	6	6
(Netherlands) Maarten Ter Hofte	3	4
(France) Stéphane Houdet	6^{8}	5
(United States) Casey Ratzlaff	7^{10}	7
(Spain) Daniel Caverzaschi	1	2
4	(Argentina) Gustavo Fernández	6	6
(Israel) Sergei Lysov	1	1
(China) Ji Zhenxu	6	6
(Netherlands) Tom Egberink	1	3
2	(United Kingdom) Alfie Hewett	6	6

Quarterfinals
1	(Japan) T Oda	6	6
(Japan) T Miki	2	2
3	(Spain) M de la Puente	6	6
WC	(United Kingdom) A Penney	0	1
(United States) C Ratzlaff	0	1
4	(Argentina) G Fernández	6	6
(China) Z Ji	4	1
2	(United Kingdom) A Hewett	6	6

Semifinals
1	(Japan) T Oda	7	6
3	(Spain) M de la Puente	5	3
4	(Argentina) G Fernández	7^{7}	0	3
2	(United Kingdom) A Hewett	6^{2}	6	6

Final
1	(Japan) T Oda	6	6
2	(United Kingdom) A Hewett	1	1
