= 2026 Wimbledon Championships – Wheelchair quad singles =

Tennis championship

Wheelchair quad singles
- 2026 Wimbledon Championships

Final
- Champion: (Netherlands) Niels Vink
- Runner-up: (Netherlands) Sam Schröder
- Score: 6–1, 6–3
- Date: 12 July 2026

Details
- Draw: 8
- Seeds: 2

Events
| Singles | men | women | | boys | girls |
| Doubles | men | women | mixed | boys | girls |
| WC Singles | men | women | quad |
| WC Doubles | men | women | quad |
| 14&U Singles | boys | girls |
| Legends | men | women | mixed |
- Wimbledon Championships

Three-time defending champion Niels Vink defeated Sam Schröder in a rematch of the previous year's final, 6–1, 6–3 to win the quad singles wheelchair tennis title at the 2026 Wimbledon Championships. It was his fifth consecutive major singles title and tenth overall.

== Seeds ==
1. (Netherlands) Niels Vink (champion)
2. (Netherlands) Sam Schröder (final)

== Draw ==
Key

- Q = Qualifier
- WC = Wild card
- LL = Lucky loser
- Alt = Alternate
- ITF = ITF entry
- PR = Protected ranking
- SR = Special ranking
- SE = Special exempt
- JE = Junior exempt
- JR = Junior Accelerator Programme entrant
- CO = College Accelerator Programme entrant
- NG = Next Gen Accelerator Program entrant
- w/o = Walkover
- r = Retired
- d = Defaulted

=== Finals ===
Quarterfinals
1 | (Netherlands) Niels Vink | 6 | 6
WC | (United Kingdom) Gregory Slade | 0 | 3
(Israel) Guy Sasson | 7^{8} | 6
(Australia) Jin Woodman | 6^{6} | 3
(Argentina) Gonzalo Enrique Lazarte | 5 | 2
(United Kingdom) Andy Lapthorne | 7 | 6
(Turkey) Ahmet Kaplan | 0 | 0
2 | (Netherlands) Sam Schröder | 6 | 6

Semifinals
1 | (Netherlands) Niels Vink | 6 | 6
(Israel) Guy Sasson | 4 | 1
(United Kingdom) Andy Lapthorne | 1 | 1
2 | (Netherlands) Sam Schröder | 6 | 6

Final
1 | (Netherlands) Niels Vink | 6 | 6
2 | (Netherlands) Sam Schröder | 1 | 3
