= 2026 Wimbledon Championships – Mixed doubles =

Tennis championship

Mixed doubles
- 2026 Wimbledon Championships

Final
- Champions: (El Salvador) Marcelo Arévalo (Latvia) Jeļena Ostapenko
- Runners-up: (Australia) Marc Polmans (Australia) Storm Hunter
- Score: 4–6, 7–5, 6–2
- Date: 9 July 2026

Details
- Draw: 32
- Seeds: 8

Events
Singles	men	women		boys	girls
Doubles	men	women	mixed	boys	girls
WC Singles	men	women	quad
WC Doubles	men	women	quad
14&U Singles	boys	girls
Legends	men	women	mixed
- Wimbledon Championships

Marcelo Arévalo and Jeļena Ostapenko defeated Marc Polmans and Storm Hunter in the final, 4–6, 7–5, 6–2 to win the mixed doubles tennis title at the 2026 Wimbledon Championships. Arévalo became the first Salvadoran player to win a Wimbledon title. Ostapenko was the seventh female player in the past 60 years to win major titles in singles, doubles, and mixed doubles.

Sem Verbeek and Kateřina Siniaková were the reigning champions, but they did not participate this year.

== Seeds ==
1. (Italy) Andrea Vavassori / (Italy) Sara Errani (second round)
2. (El Salvador) Marcelo Arévalo / (Latvia) Jeļena Ostapenko (champions)
3. (United States) Christian Harrison / (China) Zhang Shuai (semifinals)
4. (United Kingdom) Henry Patten / (United Kingdom) Olivia Nicholls (first round)
5. (United Kingdom) Julian Cash / (Netherlands) Demi Schuurs (first round)
6. (United Kingdom) Neal Skupski / (United States) Desirae Krawczyk (quarterfinals)
7. (United Kingdom) Lloyd Glasspool / (Slovakia) Tereza Mihalíková (second round)
8. (United States) JJ Tracy / (Kazakhstan) Anna Danilina (second round)

== Draw ==
Key

- Q = Qualifier
- WC = Wild card
- LL = Lucky loser
- Alt = Alternate
- ITF = ITF entry
- PR = Protected ranking
- SR = Special ranking
- SE = Special exempt
- JE = Junior exempt
- JR = Junior Accelerator Programme entrant
- CO = College Accelerator Programme entrant
- NG = Next Gen Accelerator Program entrant
- w/o = Walkover
- r = Retired
- d = Defaulted

=== Finals ===
Semifinals
(Australia) Marc Polmans (Australia) Storm Hunter	7^{7}	6
(Croatia) Mate Pavić (Hungary) Fanny Stollár	6^{5}	3
3	(United States) Christian Harrison (China) Zhang Shuai	3	7	4
2	(El Salvador) Marcelo Arévalo (Latvia) Jeļena Ostapenko	6	5	6

Final
(Australia) Marc Polmans (Australia) Storm Hunter	6	5	2
2	(El Salvador) Marcelo Arévalo (Latvia) Jeļena Ostapenko	4	7	6

=== Top half ===
First round
1	(Italy) A Vavassori (Italy) S Errani	6	6
WC	(United Kingdom) D Stevenson (United Kingdom) J Burrage	4	1
(Australia) M Polmans (Australia) S Hunter	6	6
(France) T Arribagé (United States) N Melichar-Martinez	3	3
(Argentina) G Andreozzi (Indonesia) A Sutjiadi	4	6	6
(France) M Guinard (France) K Mladenovic	6	4	4
WC	(United Kingdom) L Johnson (United Kingdom) E Appleton	5	4
8	(United States) JJ Tracy (Kazakhstan) A Danilina	7	6
4	(United Kingdom) H Patten (United Kingdom) O Nicholls	6^{3}	3
(United States) E King (Canada) G Dabrowski	7^{7}	6
(Monaco) H Nys (United States) Q Gleason	6	6^{5}	4
(Croatia) M Pavić (Hungary) F Stollár	3	7^{7}	6
(Portugal) F Cabral (Australia) E Perez	5	7	6
(Netherlands) D Pel (Ukraine) L Kichenok	7	5	2
WC	(United Kingdom) B Harris (United Kingdom) F Christie	6^{3}	7^{7}	4
6	(United Kingdom) N Skupski (United States) D Krawczyk	7^{7}	6^{5}	6

Second round
1	(Italy) A Vavassori (Italy) S Errani	3	7^{7}	2
(Australia) M Polmans (Australia) S Hunter	6	6^{2}	6
(Argentina) G Andreozzi (Indonesia) A Sutjiadi	7^{8}	5	6
8	(United States) JJ Tracy (Kazakhstan) A Danilina	6^{6}	7	3
(United States) E King (Canada) G Dabrowski	6	5	3
(Croatia) M Pavić (Hungary) F Stollár	4	7	6
(Portugal) F Cabral (Australia) E Perez	6^{5}	6	3
6	(United Kingdom) N Skupski (United States) D Krawczyk	7^{7}	4	6

Quarterfinals
(Australia) M Polmans (Australia) S Hunter	7^{7}	7
(Argentina) G Andreozzi (Indonesia) A Sutjiadi	6^{5}	5
(Croatia) M Pavić (Hungary) F Stollár	7^{7}	7^{7}
6	(United Kingdom) N Skupski (United States) D Krawczyk	6^{2}	6^{5}

Semifinals
(Australia) M Polmans (Australia) S Hunter	7^{7}	6
(Croatia) M Pavić (Hungary) F Stollár	6^{5}	3

=== Bottom half ===
First round
5	(United Kingdom) J Cash (Netherlands) D Schuurs	6^{7}	4
(United Kingdom) J Salisbury (Canada) L Fernandez	7^{9}	6
WC	(United Kingdom) B Jones (United Kingdom) M Lumsden	6	3	6
WC	(United Kingdom) J Paris (United Kingdom) E Silva	3	6	3
(Poland) J Zieliński (Chinese Taipei) S-w Hsieh	6	3	4
WC	(United Kingdom) M Willis (United Kingdom) H Watson	3	6	6
(Sweden) A Göransson (New Zealand) E Routliffe	4	4
3	(United States) C Harrison (China) S Zhang	6	6
7	(United Kingdom) L Glasspool (Slovakia) T Mihalíková	6	6
WC	(Germany) K Krawietz (United States) V Williams	4	4
WC	(Australia) J Peers (United Kingdom) K Swan	7^{7}	4	6^{7}
(France) É Roger-Vasselin (Germany) L Siegemund	6^{4}	6	7^{10}
(Austria) L Miedler (China) H Guo	6	6^{3}	4
PR	(Argentina) A Molteni (Croatia) D Jurak Schreiber	3	7^{7}	6
(France) A Olivetti; V Zvonareva	2	7^{7}	6^{7}
2	(El Salvador) M Arévalo (Latvia) J Ostapenko	6	6^{4}	7^{10}

Second round
(United Kingdom) J Salisbury (Canada) L Fernandez	6	4	6
WC	(United Kingdom) B Jones (United Kingdom) M Lumsden	4	6	2
WC	(United Kingdom) M Willis (United Kingdom) H Watson	2	6^{4}
3	(United States) C Harrison (China) S Zhang	6	7^{7}
7	(United Kingdom) L Glasspool (Slovakia) T Mihalíková	3	6^{3}
(France) É Roger-Vasselin (Germany) L Siegemund	6	7^{7}
PR	(Argentina) A Molteni (Croatia) D Jurak Schreiber	2	2
2	(El Salvador) M Arévalo (Latvia) J Ostapenko	6	6

Quarterfinals
(United Kingdom) J Salisbury (Canada) L Fernandez	7^{7}	3	3
3	(United States) C Harrison (China) S Zhang	6^{5}	6	6
(France) É Roger-Vasselin (Germany) L Siegemund	4	6^{7}
2	(El Salvador) M Arévalo (Latvia) J Ostapenko	6	7^{9}

Semifinals
3	(United States) C Harrison (China) S Zhang	3	7	4
2	(El Salvador) M Arévalo (Latvia) J Ostapenko	6	5	6

== Other entry information ==
=== Wildcards ===
- (United Kingdom) Billy Harris / (United Kingdom) Freya Christie
- (United Kingdom) Luke Johnson / (United Kingdom) Emily Appleton
- (United Kingdom) Ben Jones / (United Kingdom) Maia Lumsden
- (Germany) Kevin Krawietz / (United States) Venus Williams
- (United Kingdom) Joshua Paris / (United Kingdom) Eden Silva
- (Australia) John Peers / (United Kingdom) Katie Swan
- (United Kingdom) David Stevenson / (United Kingdom) Jodie Burrage
- (United Kingdom) Marcus Willis / (United Kingdom) Heather Watson

=== Protected ranking ===
- (Argentina) Andrés Molteni / (Croatia) Darija Jurak Schreiber
