= Cornelia Oosthuizen =

- Country (sports): Great Britain
- Born: 21 March 1979 (age 46); Pretoria, South Africa
- Turned pro: 2019
- Plays: Right-handed

Singles
- Career titles: 8
- Current ranking: No. 18 (18 August 2025)

Grand Slam singles results
- Wimbledon: 1R (2025)

Doubles
- Career titles: 11
- Current ranking: No. 26 (18 August 2025)

Grand Slam doubles results
- Wimbledon: QF (2025)
Medal record
European Para Championships
| Silver medal – second place | 2023 Rotterdam | Women's doubles |
Invictus Games
| Bronze medal – third place | 2017 Toronto | Women's singles |

Cornelia Oosthuizen (born 21 March 1979 in Pretoria, South Africa) is a South African-born British wheelchair tennis player, she is currently World number 18 as of August 2025. She is a European Para silver medalist and has won a bronze medal at the Invictus Games.

Oosthuizen served with the Adjutant General's Corps in Afghanistan. She was discharged from the army in 2016 following a severe injury two years earlier in 2014 and was diagnosed with complex regional pain syndrome, she chose to amputate her leg in that year.
