= 2026 French Open – Day-by-day summaries =

The 2026 French Open's day-by-day summaries and order of play for main draw matches on the three main tennis courts, starting from May 24 until June 7.

All times are in CEST.

== Day 1 (24 May) ==
- Seeds out:
  - Men's singles: (United States) Taylor Fritz [7], (Argentina) Tomás Martín Etcheverry [23]
  - Women's singles: (Denmark) Clara Tauson [21]
- Schedule of play

Matches on main courts
Matches on Court Philippe Chatrier (Center Court)
Event	Winner	Loser	Score
Women's singles - 1st round	(Switzerland) Belinda Bencic [11]	(Austria) Sinja Kraus [Q]	6–2, 6–3
Men's singles - 1st round	(Germany) Alexander Zverev [2]	(France) Benjamin Bonzi	6–3, 6–4, 6–2
Women's singles - 1st round	Mirra Andreeva [8]	(France) Fiona Ferro [WC]	6–3, 6–3
Men's singles - 1st round	(Serbia) Novak Djokovic [3]	(France) Giovanni Mpetshi Perricard	5–7, 7–5, 6–1, 6–4
Matches on Court Suzanne Lenglen (Grandstand)
Event	Winner	Loser	Score
Men's singles - 1st round	Karen Khachanov [13]	(France) Arthur Géa [WC]	6–3, 7–6^{(7–3)}, 6–0
Women's singles - 1st round	(United States) Hailey Baptiste [26]	(Czech Republic) Barbora Krejčíková	6–7^{(7–9)}, 7–6^{(8–6)}, 6–2
Men's singles - 1st round	(United States) Nishesh Basavareddy [WC]	(United States) Taylor Fritz [7]	7–6^{(7–5)}, 7–6^{(7–5)}, 6–7^{(9–11)}, 6–1
Women's singles - 1st round	(Romania) Sorana Cîrstea [18]	(France) Ksenia Efremova [WC]	6–3, 6–1
Matches on Court Simonne Mathieu
Event	Winner	Loser	Score
Women's singles - 1st round	(Ukraine) Marta Kostyuk [15]	(Spain) Oksana Selekhmeteva	6–2, 6–3
Women's singles - 1st round	(United States) Katie Volynets	(France) Clara Burel [WC]	6–3, 6–1
Men's singles - 1st round	(Czech Republic) Jakub Menšík [26]	(France) Titouan Droguet [WC]	6–3, 6–2, 6–4
Men's singles - 1st round	(Brazil) João Fonseca [28]	(France) Luka Pavlovic [Q]	7–6^{(8–6)}, 6–4, 6–2
Men's singles - 1st round (Note: This match was originally scheduled to play on Court 14, but was moved to Court Simonne Mathieu following the conclusion of Fonseca–Pavlovic match.)	(Italy) Lorenzo Sonego	(France) Pierre-Hugues Herbert [Q]	7–6^{(7–3)}, 5–7, 6–2, 1–6, 6–4
Coloured background indicates a night match
Day matches began at 11 am (12 pm on Court Philippe Chatrier), whilst night match begins at 8:15 pm CEST

== Day 2 (25 May) ==
- Seeds out:
  - Men's singles: (Czech Republic) Jiří Lehečka [12]
  - Women's singles: Ekaterina Alexandrova [14], Liudmila Samsonova [20], (Canada) Leylah Fernandez [24], (Spain) Cristina Bucșa [31]
- Schedule of play

Matches on main courts
Matches on Court Philippe Chatrier (Center Court)
Event	Winner	Loser	Score
Women's singles - 1st round	(Poland) Iga Świątek [3]	(Australia) Emerson Jones [WC]	6–1, 6–2
Women's singles - 1st round	(Kazakhstan) Elena Rybakina [2]	(Slovenia) Veronika Erjavec	6–2, 6–2
Men's singles - 1st round	(France) Ugo Humbert [32]	(France) Adrian Mannarino	6–3, 6–4, 6–3
Men's singles - 1st round	(France) Hugo Gaston [WC]	(France) Gaël Monfils [WC]	6–2, 6–3, 3–6, 2–6, 6–0
Matches on Court Suzanne Lenglen (Grandstand)
Event	Winner	Loser	Score
Men's singles - 1st round	(France) Arthur Rinderknech [22]	(Austria) Jurij Rodionov [Q]	7–6^{(7–5)}, 6–2, 6–3
Women's singles - 1st round	(Ukraine) Elina Svitolina [7]	(Hungary) Anna Bondár	3–6, 6–1, 7–6^{(10–3)}
Women's singles - 1st round	(United States) Amanda Anisimova [6]	(France) Tiantsoa Rakotomanga Rajaonah [WC]	6–3, 6–1
Men's singles - 1st round	(United States) Ben Shelton [5]	(Spain) Daniel Mérida	6–3, 6–3, 6–4
Women's singles - 1st round (Note: This match was originally scheduled to play on Court Simonne Mathieu, but was moved to Court Suzanne Lenglen Mathieu following the conclusion of Shelton-Merida match due to match overruns.)	(Czech Republic) Karolína Muchová [10]	Anastasia Zakharova	7–5, 6–2
Matches on Court Simonne Mathieu
Event	Winner	Loser	Score
Women's singles - 1st round	(Italy) Jasmine Paolini [13]	(Ukraine) Dayana Yastremska	7−5, 6−3
Men's singles - 1st round	(Netherlands) Jesper de Jong [LL]	(Switzerland) Stan Wawrinka	6−3, 3−6, 6−3, 6−4
Men's singles - 1st round	(Norway) Casper Ruud [15]	Roman Safiullin [Q]	6−2, 7−6^{(7−5)}, 5−7, 0−6, 6−2
Coloured background indicates a night match
Day matches began at 11 am (12 pm on Court Philippe Chatrier), whilst night match began at 8:15 pm CEST

== Day 3 (26 May) ==
- Seeds out:
  - Men's singles: Daniil Medvedev [6], (Kazakhstan) Alexander Bublik [9], (United Kingdom) Cameron Norrie [20], (Netherlands) Tallon Griekspoor [29], (France) Corentin Moutet [30]
  - Women's singles: (United States) Jessica Pegula [5], (Czech Republic) Linda Nosková [12]
  - Women's doubles: (Ukraine) Lyudmyla Kichenok / (United States) Desirae Krawczyk [9]
- Schedule of play

Matches on main courts
Matches on Court Philippe Chatrier (Center Court)
Event	Winner	Loser	Score
Women's singles - 1st round	Aryna Sabalenka [1]	(Spain) Jéssica Bouzas Maneiro	6–4, 6–2
Men's singles - 1st round	(Greece) Stefanos Tsitsipas	(France) Alexandre Müller	6–2, 3–0, retired
Women's singles - 1st round	(United States) Coco Gauff [4]	(United States) Taylor Townsend	6–4, 6–0
Women's singles - 1st round (Note: This match was originally scheduled to play on Court 7, but was moved to Court Philippe Chatrier following the conclusion of Gauff-Townsend match.)	(France) Diane Parry	(Ukraine) Anhelina Kalinina [PR]	0–6, 6–2, 6–4
Men's singles - 1st round	(Italy) Jannik Sinner [1]	(France) Clément Tabur [WC]	6–1, 6–3, 6–4
Matches on Court Suzanne Lenglen (Grandstand)
Event	Winner	Loser	Score
Men's singles - 1st round	(Australia) Adam Walton [WC]	Daniil Medvedev [6]	6–2, 1–6, 6–1, 1–6, 6–4
Women's singles - 1st round	(Japan) Naomi Osaka [16]	(Germany) Laura Siegemund	6–3, 7–6^{(7–3)}
Women's singles - 1st round	Anna Kalinskaya [22]	(France) Loïs Boisson	6−2, 6−2
Men's singles - 1st round	(Canada) Félix Auger-Aliassime [4]	(Germany) Daniel Altmaier	4–6, 6–4, 4–6, 6–1, 7–6^{(10–7)}
Matches on Court Simonne Mathieu
Event	Winner	Loser	Score
Men's singles - 1st round	(France) Moïse Kouamé [WC]	(Croatia) Marin Čilić	7–6^{(7–4)}, 6–2, 6–1
Men's singles - 1st round	(Czech Republic) Vít Kopřiva	(France) Corentin Moutet [30]	6–3, 5–7, 6–4, 3–6, 6–3
Women's singles - 1st round	(United States) Madison Keys [19]	(Belgium) Hanne Vandewinkel	6–3, 6–0
Women's singles - 1st round	(Australia) Kimberly Birrell	(United States) Jessica Pegula [5]	1–6, 6–3, 6–3
Coloured background indicates a night match
Day matches began at 11 am (12 pm on Court Philippe Chatrier), whilst night match began at 8:15 pm CEST

== Day 4 (27 May) ==
- Seeds out:
  - Men's singles: (Monaco) Valentin Vacherot [16] (Note: Withdrew on the day before his scheduled second round match), (Spain) Alejandro Davidovich Fokina [21], (France) Ugo Humbert [32]
  - Women's singles: (Kazakhstan) Elena Rybakina [2], (Italy) Jasmine Paolini [13], (United States) Hailey Baptiste [26], (Latvia) Jeļena Ostapenko [29], (China) Wang Xinyu [32]
  - Men's doubles: (Brazil) Orlando Luz / (Brazil) Rafael Matos [16]
  - Women's doubles: (China) Jiang Xinyu / (China) Xu Yifan [14]
- Schedule of play

Matches on main courts
Matches on Court Philippe Chatrier (Center Court)
Event	Winner	Loser	Score
Women's singles - 2nd round	(Poland) Iga Świątek [3]	(Czech Republic) Sára Bejlek	6–2, 6–3
Women's singles - 2nd round	(Ukraine) Elina Svitolina [7]	(Spain) Kaitlin Quevedo [Q]	6−0, 6−4
Men's singles - 2nd round	(Serbia) Novak Djokovic [3]	(France) Valentin Royer	6–3, 6–2, 6–7^{(7–9)}, 6–3
Men's singles - 2nd round	(Germany) Alexander Zverev [2]	(Czech Republic) Tomáš Macháč	6−4, 6−2, 6−2
Matches on Court Suzanne Lenglen (Grandstand)
Event	Winner	Loser	Score
Men's singles - 2nd round	Karen Khachanov [13]	(Argentina) Marco Trungelliti	7–6^{(7–5)}, 5–7, 6–1, 7–6^{(7–4)}
Women's singles - 2nd round	(Ukraine) Yuliia Starodubtseva	(Kazakhstan) Elena Rybakina [2]	3–6, 6–1, 7–6^{(10–4)}
Women's singles - 2nd round	(Argentina) Solana Sierra	(Italy) Jasmine Paolini [13]	3–6, 6–4, 6–3
Men's singles - 2nd round	(Norway) Casper Ruud [15]	(Serbia) Hamad Medjedovic	6–3, 6–2, 6–4
Matches on Court Simonne Mathieu
Event	Winner	Loser	Score
Women's singles - 2nd round	(Switzerland) Belinda Bencic [11]	(United States) Caty McNally	6–4, 6–0
Men's singles - 2nd round	Andrey Rublev [11]	(Argentina) Camilo Ugo Carabelli	6–1, 1–6, 6–3, 7–6^{(7–5)}
Men's singles - 2nd round	(France) Quentin Halys	(France) Ugo Humbert [32]	6–4, 7–6^{(7–4)}, 7–6^{(10–8)}
Women's singles - 2nd round	Mirra Andreeva [8]	(Spain) Marina Bassols Ribera [Q]	3–6, 6–1, 6–1
Coloured background indicates a night match
Day matches began at 11 am (12 pm on Court Philippe Chatrier), whilst night match began at 8:15 pm CEST

== Day 5 (28 May) ==
- Seeds out:
  - Men's singles: (Italy) Jannik Sinner [1], (United States) Ben Shelton [5], (Italy) Luciano Darderi [14], (France) Arthur Rinderknech [22]
  - Women's singles: (Belgium) Elise Mertens [23], (United States) Ann Li [30]
  - Men's doubles: (Portugal) Francisco Cabral / (United Kingdom) Joe Salisbury [8], (France) Sadio Doumbia / (France) Fabien Reboul [11], (France) Théo Arribagé / (France) Albano Olivetti [13]
  - Women's doubles: (United States) Asia Muhammad / (Hungary) Fanny Stollár [8]
  - Mixed doubles: (Brazil) Luisa Stefani / (El Salvador) Marcelo Arévalo [2], (Netherlands) Demi Schuurs / (United Kingdom) Julian Cash [5]
- Schedule of play

Matches on main courts
Matches on Court Philippe Chatrier (Center Court)
Event	Winner	Loser	Score
Men's singles - 2nd round	(Argentina) Juan Manuel Cerúndolo	(Italy) Jannik Sinner [1]	3–6, 2–6, 7–5, 6–1, 6–1
Women's singles - 2nd round	(France) Diane Parry	(United States) Ann Li [30]	6−3, 6−4
Women's singles - 2nd round	Aryna Sabalenka [1]	(France) Elsa Jacquemot	7−5, 6−2
Men's singles - 2nd round	(Italy) Matteo Berrettini	(France) Arthur Rinderknech [22]	6−4, 6−4, 6−4
Matches on Court Suzanne Lenglen (Grandstand)
Event	Winner	Loser	Score
Men's singles - 2nd round	(France) Moïse Kouamé [WC]	(Paraguay) Daniel Vallejo	6−3, 7−5, 3−6, 2−6, 7−6^{(10−8)}
Women's singles - 2nd round	(United States) Amanda Anisimova [6]	(Austria) Julia Grabher	6−0, 0−0 ret.
Women's singles - 2nd round	(United States) Coco Gauff [4]	(Egypt) Mayar Sherif [Q]	6−3, 6−2
Men's singles - 2nd round	(Belgium) Raphaël Collignon	(United States) Ben Shelton [5]	6−4, 7−5, 6−4
Matches on Court Simonne Mathieu
Event	Winner	Loser	Score
Women's singles - 2nd round	(Japan) Naomi Osaka [16]	(Croatia) Donna Vekić	7–6^{(7–1)}, 6–4
Men's singles - 2nd round	(Argentina) Francisco Cerúndolo [25]	(France) Hugo Gaston [WC]	2–6, 6–4, 6–2, 6–1
Men's singles - 2nd round	(Canada) Félix Auger-Aliassime [4]	(Argentina) Román Andrés Burruchaga	4−6, 6−0, 7−5, 6−1
Women's singles - 2nd round	(Canada) Victoria Mboko [9]	(Czech Republic) Kateřina Siniaková	5−7, 6−4, 6−2
Coloured background indicates a night match
Day matches began at 11 am (12 pm on Court Philippe Chatrier), whilst night match began at 8:15 pm CEST

== Day 6 (29 May) ==
- Seeds out:
  - Men's singles: (Serbia) Novak Djokovic [3], (Australia) Alex de Minaur [8], Karen Khachanov [13], (United States) Tommy Paul [24]
  - Women's singles: (Czech Republic) Karolína Muchová [10], (Czech Republic) Marie Bouzková [27]
  - Men's doubles: (United Kingdom) Julian Cash / (United Kingdom) Lloyd Glasspool [3], (United States) Austin Krajicek / (Croatia) Nikola Mektić [12], (United States) Robert Cash / (United States) JJ Tracy [15]
  - Women's doubles: (Latvia) Jeļena Ostapenko / (New Zealand) Erin Routliffe [5]
  - Mixed doubles: (Slovakia) Tereza Mihalíková / (Germany) Kevin Krawietz [8]
- Schedule of play

Matches on main courts
Matches on Court Philippe Chatrier (Center Court)
Event	Winner	Loser	Score
Women's singles - 3rd round	(Poland) Iga Świątek [3]	(Poland) Magda Linette	6–4, 6–4
Women's singles - 3rd round	Mirra Andreeva [8]	(Czech Republic) Marie Bouzková [27]	6–4, 6–2
Men's singles - 3rd round	(Brazil) João Fonseca [28]	(Serbia) Novak Djokovic [3]	4–6, 4–6, 6–3, 7–5, 7–5
Men's singles - 3rd round	(Germany) Alexander Zverev [2]	(France) Quentin Halys	6–4, 6–3, 5–7, 6–2
Matches on Court Suzanne Lenglen (Grandstand)
Event	Winner	Loser	Score
Men's singles - 3rd round	Andrey Rublev [11]	(Portugal) Nuno Borges	7–5, 7−6^{(7−2)}, 7−6^{(7−2)}
Women's singles - 3rd round	(Switzerland) Jil Teichmann [PR]	(Czech Republic) Karolína Muchová [10]	6–1, 7–5
Women's singles - 3rd round	(Ukraine) Elina Svitolina [7]	(Germany) Tamara Korpatsch	6–2 6–3
Men's singles - 3rd round	(Norway) Casper Ruud [15]	(United States) Tommy Paul [24]	4–6, 6–7^{(4–7)}, 6–4, 7–6^{(7–4)}, 7–5
Matches on Court Simonne Mathieu
Event	Winner	Loser	Score
Women's singles - 3rd round	(Ukraine) Marta Kostyuk [15]	(Switzerland) Viktorija Golubic	6–4, 6–3
Men's singles - 3rd round	(Spain) Rafael Jódar [27]	(United States) Alex Michelsen	7−6^{(7−2)}, 6−7^{(5−7)}, 4–6, 6–3, 6–3
Men's singles - 3rd round	(Czech Republic) Jakub Menšík [26]	(Australia) Alex de Minaur [8]	0−6, 6−2, 6−2, 6–3
Women's singles - 3rd round	(Switzerland) Belinda Bencic [11]	(United States) Peyton Stearns	6−3, 6–3
Coloured background indicates a night match
Day matches began at 11 am (12 pm on Court Philippe Chatrier), whilst night match began at 8:15 pm CEST

== Day 7 (30 May) ==
- Seeds out:
  - Men's singles: (United States) Learner Tien [18], (Argentina) Francisco Cerúndolo [25], (United States) Brandon Nakashima [31]
  - Women's singles: (United States) Coco Gauff [3], (United States) Amanda Anisimova [6], ' (Canada) Victoria Mboko [9], (United States) Iva Jovic [17]
  - Men's doubles: (United States) Christian Harrison / (United Kingdom) Neal Skupski [4]
  - Women's doubles: (Australia) Storm Hunter / (United States) Caty McNally [12], (Japan) Eri Hozumi / (Chinese Taipei) Wu Fang-hsien [16]
  - Mixed doubles: (United Kingdom) Olivia Nicholls / (United Kingdom) Henry Patten [6]
- Schedule of play

Matches on main courts
Matches on Court Philippe Chatrier (Center Court)
Event	Winner	Loser	Score
Men's singles - 3rd round	(Italy) Flavio Cobolli [10]	(United States) Learner Tien [18]	6–2, 6–2, 6–3
Women's singles - 3rd round	(France) Diane Parry	(United States) Amanda Anisimova [6]	6–3, 4–6, 7–6^{(10–3)}
Women's singles - 3rd round	(Austria) Anastasia Potapova [28]	(United States) Coco Gauff [3]	4–6, 7–6^{(7–1)}, 6–4
Men's singles - 3rd round	(Canada) Félix Auger-Aliassime [4]	(United States) Brandon Nakashima [31]	5−7, 6−1, 7–6^{(7–4)}, 7–6^{(7–1)}
Matches on Court Suzanne Lenglen (Grandstand)
Event	Winner	Loser	Score
Women's singles - 3rd round	(Japan) Naomi Osaka [16]	(United States) Iva Jovic [17]	7−6^{(7−5)}, 6−7^{(3−7)}, 6–4
Women's singles - 3rd round	Aryna Sabalenka [1]	(Australia) Daria Kasatkina	6–0, 7–5
Men's singles - 3rd round	(Chile) Alejandro Tabilo	(France) Moïse Kouamé [WC]	4−6, 6−3, 6−4, 7−6^{(11−9)}
Men's singles - 3rd round	(United States) Frances Tiafoe [19]	(Portugal) Jaime Faria [Q]	4−6, 6−7^{(4−7)}, 7−6^{(7−4)}, 6−1, 6−2
Matches on Court Simonne Mathieu
Event	Winner	Loser	Score
Women's singles - 3rd round	(Poland) Maja Chwalińska [Q]	(Greece) Maria Sakkari	1–6, 6–3, 6–2
Men's singles - 3rd round	(Italy) Matteo Berrettini	(Argentina) Francisco Comesaña	7–6^{(7–3)}, 5–7, 6–7^{(4–7)}, 6–4, 7–6^{(15–13)}
Women's singles - 3rd round	(United States) Madison Keys [19]	(Canada) Victoria Mboko [9]	6−3, 5−7, 7−5
Coloured background indicates a night match
Day matches began at 11 am (12 pm on Court Philippe Chatrier), whilst night match begins at 8:15 pm CEST

== Day 8 (31 May) ==
- Seeds out:
  - Men's singles: Andrey Rublev [11], (Norway) Casper Ruud [15]
  - Women's singles: (Poland) Iga Świątek [3], (Switzerland) Belinda Bencic [11]
  - Men's doubles: (Austria) Alexander Erler / (Austria) Lucas Miedler [14]
  - Women's doubles: (Spain) Cristina Bucșa / (United States) Nicole Melichar-Martinez [6], (Slovakia) Tereza Mihalíková / (United Kingdom) Olivia Nicholls [10]
- Schedule of play

Matches on main courts
Matches on Court Philippe Chatrier (Center Court)
Event	Winner	Loser	Score
Women's singles - 4th round	(Ukraine) Marta Kostyuk [15]	(Poland) Iga Świątek [3]	7–5, 6–1
Women's singles - 4th round	(Ukraine) Elina Svitolina [7]	(Switzerland) Belinda Bencic [11]	4–6, 6–4, 6–0
Men's singles - 4th round	(Germany) Alexander Zverev [2]	(Netherlands) Jesper de Jong [LL]	7–6^{(7−3)}, 6–4, 6–1
Men's singles - 4th round	(Brazil) João Fonseca [28]	(Norway) Casper Ruud [15]	7–5, 7–6^{(10−8)}, 5–7, 6–2
Matches on Court Suzanne Lenglen (Grandstand)
Event	Winner	Loser	Score
Women's singles - 4th round	(Romania) Sorana Cîrstea [18]	(China) Wang Xiyu [Q]	6–3, 7–6^{(7−4)}
Men's singles - 4th round	(Spain) Rafael Jódar [27]	(Spain) Pablo Carreño Busta	4–6, 4–6, 6–1, 6–2, 6–2
Women's singles - 4th round	Mirra Andreeva [8]	(Switzerland) Jil Teichmann [PR]	6–3, 6–2
Men's singles - 4th round	(Czech Republic) Jakub Menšík [26]	Andrey Rublev [11]	6–3, 7–6^{(8−6)}, 4–6, 2–6, 6–3
Matches on Court Simonne Mathieu
Event	Winner	Loser	Score
Men's doubles - 3rd round	(Czech Republic) Petr Nouza (Austria) Neil Oberleitner	(Czech Republic) Adam Pavlásek (Czech Republic) Patrik Rikl	6–2, 6–7^{(1−7)}, 6–3
Women's doubles - 3rd round	(Belgium) Magali Kempen [PR] (Slovenia) Andreja Klepač [PR]	(Slovakia) Tereza Mihalíková [10] (United Kingdom) Olivia Nicholls [10]	6–2, 7–5
Men's doubles - 3rd round	(Spain) Marcel Granollers [1] (Argentina) Horacio Zeballos [1]	(Austria) Alexander Erler [14] (Austria) Lucas Miedler [14]	6–4, 1–1 ret.
Mixed doubles - 2nd round	(United States) Desirae Krawczyk [4] (United Kingdom) Neal Skupski [4]	Alexandra Panova (India) Yuki Bhambri	6–1, 6–3
Coloured background indicates a night match
Day matches began at 11 am, whilst night match began at 8:15 pm CEST

== Day 9 (1 June) ==
- Seeds out:
  - Men's singles: (United States) Frances Tiafoe [19]
  - Women's singles: (Japan) Naomi Osaka [16], (United States) Madison Keys [19], (Austria) Anastasia Potapova [28]
  - Men's doubles: (Germany) Kevin Krawietz / (Germany) Tim Pütz [6], (El Salvador) Marcelo Arévalo / (Croatia) Mate Pavić [7]
  - Women's doubles: (Belgium) Elise Mertens / (China) Zhang Shuai [3], (Norway) Ulrikke Eikeri / (United States) Quinn Gleason [15]
  - Mixed doubles: (Kazakhstan) Anna Danilina / (United States) JJ Tracy [7]
- Schedule of play

Matches on main courts
Matches on Court Philippe Chatrier (Center Court)
Event	Winner	Loser	Score
Men's singles - 4th round	(Italy) Flavio Cobolli [10]	(United States) Zachary Svajda	6–3, 6–2, 6–7^{(3−7)}, 7–6^{(7−5)}
Women's singles - 4th round	(Poland) Maja Chwalińska [Q]	(France) Diane Parry	6–3, 6–2
Men's singles - 4th round	(Canada) Félix Auger-Aliassime [4]	(Chile) Alejandro Tabilo	6–3, 7–5, 6–1
Women's singles - 4th round	Aryna Sabalenka [1]	(Japan) Naomi Osaka [16]	7–5, 6–3
Matches on Court Suzanne Lenglen (Grandstand)
Event	Winner	Loser	Score
Women's singles - 4th round	Anna Kalinskaya [22]	(Austria) Anastasia Potapova [28]	4–6, 6–2, 7–6^{(10−7)}
Women's singles - 4th round	Diana Shnaider [25]	(United States) Madison Keys [19]	6–3, 3–6, 6–0
Men's singles - 4th round	(Italy) Matteo Berrettini	(Argentina) Juan Manuel Cerúndolo	6–3, 7–6^{(7−2)}, 7–6^{(8–6)}
Men's singles - 4th round	(Italy) Matteo Arnaldi	(United States) Frances Tiafoe [19]	7–6^{(7−5)}, 6–7^{(5−7)}, 3–6, 7–6^{(7−3)}, 6–4
Matches on Court Simonne Mathieu
Event	Winner	Loser	Score
Men's doubles - 3rd round	(Finland) Harri Heliövaara [2] (United Kingdom) Henry Patten [2]	(Sweden) André Göransson (United States) Evan King	6–3, 6–4
Men's doubles - 3rd round	(France) Quentin Halys (France) Pierre-Hugues Herbert	(France) Titouan Droguet [WC] (France) Hugo Gaston [WC]	6–3, 6–3
Women's doubles - 3rd round	(China) Guo Hanyu [13] (France) Kristina Mladenovic [13]	(Belgium) Elise Mertens [3] (China) Zhang Shuai [3]	6–2, 6–4
Mixed doubles - Quarterfinals	(Italy) Sara Errani [1] (Italy) Andrea Vavassori [1]	(Kazakhstan) Anna Danilina [7] (United States) JJ Tracy [7]	6–2, 6–2
Coloured background indicates a night match
Day matches began at 11 am, whilst night match began at 8:15 pm CEST

== Day 10 (2 June) ==
- Seeds out:
  - Men's singles: (Spain) Rafael Jódar [27], (Brazil) João Fonseca [28]
  - Women's singles: (Ukraine) Elina Svitolina [7], (Romania) Sorana Cîrstea [18]
  - Women's doubles: (Germany) Laura Siegemund / Vera Zvonareva [11]
  - Mixed doubles: (United States) Desirae Krawczyk / (United Kingdom) Neal Skupski [4]
- Schedule of play

Matches on main courts
Matches on Court Philippe Chatrier (Center Court)
Event	Winner	Loser	Score
Women's singles - Quarterfinals	Mirra Andreeva [8]	(Romania) Sorana Cîrstea [18]	6–0, 6–3
Women's singles - Quarterfinals	(Ukraine) Marta Kostyuk [15]	(Ukraine) Elina Svitolina [7]	6–3, 2−6, 6−2
Men's singles - Quarterfinals	(Germany) Alexander Zverev [2]	(Spain) Rafael Jódar [27]	7–6^{(7–3)}, 6–1, 6–3
Mixed doubles - Quarterfinals	(Germany) Laura Siegemund (France) Édouard Roger-Vasselin	(United States) Desirae Krawczyk [4] (United Kingdom) Neal Skupski [4]	7–6^{(7–3)}, 7–5
Men's singles - Quarterfinals	(Czech Republic) Jakub Menšík [26]	(Brazil) João Fonseca [28]	6–4, 6–3, 7–6^{(7–3)}
Matches on Court Suzanne Lenglen (Grandstand)
Event	Winner	Loser	Score
Women's doubles - Quarterfinals	(Czech Republic) Kateřina Siniaková [1] (United States) Taylor Townsend [1]	(Belgium) Magali Kempen [PR] (Slovenia) Andreja Klepač [PR]	6−1, 6−3
Women's doubles - Quarterfinals	(Canada) Gabriela Dabrowski [4] (Brazil) Luisa Stefani [4]	(Germany) Laura Siegemund [11] Vera Zvonareva [11]	6−4, 7−5
Men's doubles - Quarterfinals	(Italy) Simone Bolelli [5] (Italy) Andrea Vavassori [5]	(Czech Republic) Petr Nouza (Austria) Neil Oberleitner	6−7^{(7−9)}, 6−1, 7−6^{(14−12)}
Wheelchair men's singles - 1st round	(Spain) Martín de la Puente [3]	(France) Stéphane Houdet	6−2, 6−3
Wheelchair men's singles - 1st round	(United Kingdom) Alfie Hewett [2]	(France) Guilhem Laget [WC]	6–3, 6–0
Matches on Court Simonne Mathieu
Event	Winner	Loser	Score
Women's Legends	(Germany) Angelique Kerber (Italy) Francesca Schiavone	(France) Pauline Parmentier (Czech Republic) Lucie Šafářová	7–5, 7–6^{(7–4)}
Boys' singles - 2nd round	(United States) Jack Kennedy [4]	(France) Daniel Jade	6−4, 6−3
Boys' doubles - 1st round	(Austria) Thilo Behrmann [4] (Chinese Taipei) Chen Kuan-shou [4]	(France) Benoît Geldof [WC] (France) Pablo Pradat [WC]	6–2, 6–4
Coloured background indicates a night match
Day matches began at 11 am, whilst night match began at 8:15 pm CEST

== Day 11 (3 June) ==
- Seeds out:
  - Men's singles: (Canada) Félix Auger-Aliassime [4]
  - Women's singles: Aryna Sabalenka [1], Anna Kalinskaya [22]
  - Men's doubles: (Monaco) Hugo Nys / (France) Édouard Roger-Vasselin [10]
  - Women's doubles: (Australia) Ellen Perez / (Netherlands) Demi Schuurs [7], (China) Guo Hanyu / (France) Kristina Mladenovic [14]
- Schedule of play

Matches on main courts
Matches on Court Philippe Chatrier (Center Court)
Event	Winner	Loser	Score
Women's singles - Quarterfinals	(Poland) Maja Chwalińska [Q]	Anna Kalinskaya [22]	7−6^{(7–3)}, 6–3
Women's singles - Quarterfinals	Diana Shnaider [25]	Aryna Sabalenka [1]	3–6, 7–5, 6–0
Men's singles - Quarterfinals	(Italy) Flavio Cobolli [10]	(Canada) Félix Auger-Aliassime [4]	4–6, 6–4, 6–4, 6–4
Men's singles - Quarterfinals	(Italy) Matteo Arnaldi	(Italy) Matteo Berrettini	7−5, 5−2 ret.
Matches on Court Suzanne Lenglen (Grandstand)
Event	Winner	Loser	Score
Women's Legends	(Switzerland) Martina Hingis (Germany) Angelique Kerber	(France) Alizé Cornet (Slovakia) Daniela Hantuchová	6−3, 6−4
Men's doubles - Quarterfinals	(Spain) Marcel Granollers [1] (Argentina) Horacio Zeballos [1]	(Monaco) Hugo Nys [10] (France) Édouard Roger-Vasselin [10]	6–3, 6–4
Men's doubles - Quarterfinals	(France) Quentin Halys (France) Pierre-Hugues Herbert	(Netherlands) Sander Arends (Netherlands) David Pel	6–4, 6–4
Mixed doubles - Semifinals	(Italy) Sara Errani [1] (Italy) Andrea Vavassori [1]	(Germany) Laura Siegemund (France) Édouard Roger-Vasselin	6–1, 6–4
Women's doubles - Quarterfinals	(Japan) Shuko Aoyama (Chinese Taipei) Liang En-shuo	(China) Guo Hanyu [13] (France) Kristina Mladenovic [13]	6−4, 6−4
Matches on Court Simonne Mathieu
Event	Winner	Loser	Score
Mixed Legends	(France) Pauline Parmentier (France) Gilles Simon	(France) Tatiana Golovin (France) Guy Forget	6−2, 6−3
Men's doubles - Quarterfinals	(Finland) Harri Heliövaara [2] (United Kingdom) Henry Patten [2]	(India) Sriram Balaji (Brazil) Marcelo Demoliner	6−3, 6−4
Men's Legends	(France) Arnaud Clément (France) Fabrice Santoro	(France) Mansour Bahrami (France) Cédric Pioline	7−5, 6−4
Mixed doubles - Semifinals	(Canada) Gabriela Dabrowski (United States) Evan King	(United States) Asia Muhammad (Croatia) Nikola Mektić	7–5, 6–7^{(6–8)}, [10−5]
Women's doubles - Quarterfinals	(Kazakhstan) Anna Danilina [2] (Serbia) Aleksandra Krunić [2]	(Australia) Ellen Perez [7] (Netherlands) Demi Schuurs [7]	6−2, 7–7^{(8−6)}
Coloured background indicates a night match
Day matches began at 11 am, whilst night match began at 8:15 pm CEST

== Day 12 (4 June) ==
- Seeds out:
  - Women's singles: (Ukraine) Marta Kostyuk [15], Diana Shnaider [25]
- Schedule of play

Matches on main courts
Matches on Court Philippe Chatrier (Center Court)
Event	Winner	Loser	Score
Mixed doubles - Final	(Italy) Sara Errani [1] (Italy) Andrea Vavassori [1]	(Canada) Gabriela Dabrowski (United States) Evan King	4–6, 6–3, [10–4]
Women's singles - Semifinals	Mirra Andreeva [8]	(Ukraine) Marta Kostyuk [15]	6−1, 6−3
Women's singles - Semifinals	(Poland) Maja Chwalińska [Q]	Diana Shnaider [25]	7–6^{(7−4)}, 6−4
Matches on Court Suzanne Lenglen (Grandstand)
Event	Winner	Loser	Score
Men's doubles - Semifinals	(Finland) Harri Heliövaara [2] (United Kingdom) Henry Patten [2]	(France) Quentin Halys (France) Pierre-Hugues Herbert	6–3, 6–4
Wheelchair Women's singles - Quarterfinals	(Japan) Yui Kamiji [1]	(France) Pauline Déroulède [WC]	6–0, 6–2
Matches on Court Simonne Mathieu
Event	Winner	Loser	Score
Men's Legends	(United States) John McEnroe (France) Jo-Wilfried Tsonga	(France) Fabrice Santoro (Sweden) Mats Wilander	7–5, 6–2
Women's Legends	(Switzerland) Martina Hingis (Czech Republic) Lucie Šafářová	(France) Tatiana Golovin (Serbia) Ana Ivanovic	6–4, 6–3
Matches began at 11 am (12 pm on Court Philippe Chatrier) CEST

== Day 13 (5 June) ==
- Seeds out:
  - Men's singles: (Czech Republic) Jakub Menšík [26]
  - Men's doubles: (Italy) Simone Bolelli / (Italy) Andrea Vavassori [5]
  - Women's doubles: (Canada) Gabriela Dabrowski / (Brazil) Luisa Stefani [4]
- Schedule of play

Matches on main courts
Matches on Court Philippe Chatrier (Center Court)
Event	Winner	Loser	Score
Men's singles - Semifinals	(Germany) Alexander Zverev [2]	(Czech Republic) Jakub Menšík [26]	7–5, 6–2, 3–6, 6–3
Men's singles - Semifinals	(Italy) Flavio Cobolli [10]	(Italy) Matteo Arnaldi	walkover
Matches on Court Suzanne Lenglen (Grandstand)
Event	Winner	Loser	Score
Wheelchair women's singles - Semifinals	(France) Ksénia Chasteau	(China) Li Xiaohui [2]	6–3, 6–1
Mixed Legends	(France) Alizé Cornet (France) Henri Leconte	(Czech Republic) Lucie Šafářová (France) Sébastien Grosjean	7–6^{(7−4)}
Women's Legends	(Serbia) Ana Ivanovic (Italy) Francesca Schiavone	(France) Nathalie Dechy (France) Pauline Parmentier	6–3, 0−0 ret.
Matches on Court Simonne Mathieu
Event	Winner	Loser	Score
Men's doubles - Semifinals	(Spain) Marcel Granollers [1] (Argentina) Horacio Zeballos [1]	(Italy) Simone Bolelli [5] (Italy) Andrea Vavassori [5]	7–6^{(7−4)}, 6−4
Women's doubles - Semifinals	(Czech Republic) Kateřina Siniaková [1] (United States) Taylor Townsend [1]	(Canada) Gabriela Dabrowski [4] (Brazil) Luisa Stefani [4]	6–0, 6–1
Women's doubles - Semifinals	(Kazakhstan) Anna Danilina [2] (Serbia) Aleksandra Krunić [2]	(Japan) Shuko Aoyama (Chinese Taipei) Liang En-shuo	7–5, 6–2
Men's Legends	(France) Mansour Bahrami (United States) Michael Chang	(France) Cédric Pioline (Sweden) Mats Wilander	7–5, 6–3
Matches began at 11 am (2:30 pm on Court Philippe Chatrier), CEST

== Day 14 (6 June) ==
- Seeds out:
  - Men's doubles: (Finland) Harri Heliövaara / (United Kingdom) Henry Patten [2]
- Schedule of play

Matches on main courts
Matches on Court Philippe Chatrier (Center Court)
Event	Winner	Loser	Score
Men's doubles - Final	(Spain) Marcel Granollers [1] (Argentina) Horacio Zeballos [1]	(Finland) Harri Heliövaara [2] (United Kingdom) Henry Patten [2]	6–4, 6–2
Women's singles - Final	Mirra Andreeva [8]	(Poland) Maja Chwalińska [Q]	6−3, 6−2
Matches on Court Suzanne Lenglen (Grandstand)
Event	Winner	Loser	Score
Mixed Legends	(France) Nathalie Dechy (France) Jo-Wilfried Tsonga	(France) Marion Bartoli (France) Gilles Simon	7–5
Wheelchair Women's singles - Final	(Netherlands) Diede de Groot [4]	(France) Ksénia Chasteau	6–1, 6–0
Men's Legends	(United States) Michael Chang (United States) John McEnroe	(France) Guy Forget (France) Henri Leconte	6–2, 6–2
Matches on Court Simonne Mathieu
Event	Winner	Loser	Score
Women's Legends	(France) Alizé Cornet (France) Tatiana Golovin	(Slovakia) Daniela Hantuchová (Serbia) Ana Ivanovic	6–4, 6–4
Girls' singles - Final	Alisa Oktiabreva [12]	(China) Sun Xinran [2]	6–2, 6–1
Boys' singles - Final	(Brazil) Guto Miguel [1]	(United States) Michael Antonius [13]	6−3, 6−4
Boys' doubles - Final	(Germany) Jamie Mackenzie [8] (Germany) Vincent Reisach [8]	(France) Mathys Domenc (France) Daniel Jade	6–1, 6–4
Matches began at 11 am, CEST

== Day 15 (7 June) ==
- Seeds out:
  - Men's singles: (Italy) Flavio Cobolli [10]
  - Women's doubles: (Kazakhstan) Anna Danilina / (Serbia) Aleksandra Krunić [2]
- Schedule of play

Matches on main courts
Matches on Court Philippe Chatrier (Center Court)
Event	Winner	Loser	Score
Women's Doubles Final	(Czech Republic) Kateřina Siniaková [1] (United States) Taylor Townsend [1]	(Kazakhstan) Anna Danilina [2] (Serbia) Aleksandra Krunić [2]	6–2, 7–5
Men's Singles Final	(Germany) Alexander Zverev [2]	(Italy) Flavio Cobolli [10]	6–1, 4–6, 6–4, 6–7^{(5–7)}, 6–1
Matches on Court Suzanne Lenglen (Grandstand)
Event	Winner	Loser	Score
Men's Legends	(France) Mansour Bahrami (France) Sébastien Grosjean	(France) Arnaud Clément (France) Cédric Pioline	7–6^{(7−5)}, 6–3
Matches began at 11 am, CEST
