= Yannik Álvarez =

Puerto Rican tennis player

Yannik Àlvarez
- Country (sports): Puerto Rico
- Born: October 12, 2008 (age 18)
- Turned pro: 2026
- Prize money: US $19,210

Singles
- Career record: 0–0
- Career titles: 0
- Highest ranking: No. 1,312 (May 4, 2026)
- Current ranking: No. 1,374 (September 14, 2026)

Grand Slam singles results
- Australian Open Junior: 1R (2026)
- French Open Junior: 2R (2026)
- Wimbledon Junior: 2R (2025)
- US Open Junior: 2R (2025, 2026)

Doubles
- Career record: 0–0
- Career titles: 0
- Highest ranking: No. 1,477 (May 4, 2026)
- Current ranking: No. 1,525 (September 14, 2026)

Grand Slam doubles results
- US Open: 1R (2026)
- Australian Open Junior: 1R (2026)
- French Open Junior: SF (2026)
- Wimbledon Junior: QF (2025)
- US Open Junior: SF (2025)
- Last updated on: September 15, 2026.

Yannik Álvarez (born 12 October 2008) is a Puerto Rican tennis player. He has a career-high ATP singles ranking of No. 1,312 and a career-high doubles ranking of No. 1,477, both achieved on May 4, 2026. Álvarez also has a career-high junior ranking of No. 11 achieved on September 7, 2026.

Álvarez received a wildcard into the 2026 US Open doubles, partnering with Noah Johnston, where they lost in the first round.

== Career ==
=== Junior career ===
Playing alongside Jack Secord of the United States he reached the quarterfinals of the Boys' doubles at the 2025 Wimbledon Championships with wins over third-seeded German pair Niels McDonald and Jamie Mackenzie and British pair Eric Lorimen and William Moxon, before losing to Mees Rottgering and Hidde Schoenmakers of the Netherlands. In doing so, he became the first Puerto Rican to win matches in the main draw of Junior Wimbledon. With Secord, he also reached the semi-finals of the boys' doubles at the 2025 US Open where they faced American pairing and eventual tournament winners Keaton Hance and Jack Kennedy. In December, he won the U18 Orange Bowl doubles with partner Ziga Sesko of Slovenia as they defeated Tanishk Konduri and Marcel Latak in the final. He had previously won the title at U16 level in 2023. He finished 2025 ranked 45 in the combined junior singles and doubles world rankings.

Playing alongside Secord, he reached the semi-finals of the boys' doubles at the 2026 French Open, where they faced eventual tournament winners Vincent Reisach and Jamie Mackenzie of Germany.

=== Professional career ===
In June 2025, he made his debut in the Davis Cup for Puerto Rico, playing as a 16-year-old and becoming the youngest player to win a Davis Cup match for Puerto Rico since 1998, with a 6-1, 6-0 win over Alejandro Obando of Venezuela at the Americas Group III Davis Cup qualifiers in Costa Rica.

== Personal life ==
Àlvarez was also eligible to represent the United States and Germany.

== ITF World Tennis Tour finals ==
=== Doubles: 1 (title) ===
Legend
ITF WTT (1–0)

Result	W–L	Date	Tournament	Tier	Surface	Partner	Opponents	Score
Win	1–0	Apr 2026	M15 Orlando, United States	WTT	Clay	(United States) Ryan Cozad	(Canada) Benjamin Thomas George (Peru) Christopher Li	6–2, 6–4
