= 2026 French Open – Wheelchair boys' singles =

Tennis championship

Wheelchair boys' singles
- 2026 French Open

Final
- Champion: (United Kingdom) Matthew Knoesen
- Runner-up: (Belgium) Alexander Lantermann
- Score: 7–6^{(7–4)}, 6–4
- Date: 5 June 2026

Details
- Draw: 4
- Seeds: 2

Events
Singles	men	women		boys	girls
Doubles	men	women	mixed	boys	girls
WC Singles	men	women	quad	boys	girls
WC Doubles	men	women	quad	boys	girls
- French Open

Maximilian Taucher is the defending champion.

== Seeds ==
1. (Belgium) Alexander Lantermann (final)
2. (United Kingdom) Matthew Knoesen (champion)

== Draw ==
Key

- Q = Qualifier
- WC = Wild card
- LL = Lucky loser
- Alt = Alternate
- ITF = ITF entry
- PR = Protected ranking
- SR = Special ranking
- SE = Special exempt
- JE = Junior exempt
- JR = Junior Accelerator Programme entrant
- CO = College Accelerator Programme entrant
- NG = Next Gen Accelerator Program entrant
- w/o = Walkover
- r = Retired
- d = Defaulted

=== Draw ===
Semifinals
1	(Belgium) Alexander Lantermann	6	6
(United Kingdom) Will Barton	2	1
(United Kingdom) Lucas John De Gouveia	1	3
2	(United Kingdom) Matthew Knoesen	6	6

Final
1	(Belgium) Alexander Lantermann	6^{4}	4
2	(United Kingdom) Matthew Knoesen	7^{7}	6
