= 2026 French Open – Wheelchair men's doubles =

Tennis championship

Wheelchair men's doubles
- 2026 French Open

Final
- Champions: (United Kingdom) Alfie Hewett (United Kingdom) Gordon Reid
- Runners-up: (Spain) Martín de la Puente (France) Stéphane Houdet
- Score: 6–2, 6–3
- Date: 5 June 2026

Details
- Draw: 8
- Seeds: 2

Events
Singles	men	women		boys	girls
Doubles	men	women	mixed	boys	girls
WC Singles	men	women	quad	boys	girls
WC Doubles	men	women	quad	boys	girls
- French Open

Six-time defending champions Alfie Hewett and Gordon Reid defeated Martín de la Puente and Stéphane Houdet in the final, 6–2, 6–3 to win the men's doubles wheelchair tennis title at the 2026 French Open.

== Seeds ==
1. (United Kingdom) Alfie Hewett / (United Kingdom) Gordon Reid (champions)
2. (Spain) Daniel Caverzaschi / (Netherlands) Ruben Spaargaren (quarterfinals)

== Draw ==
Key

- Q = Qualifier
- WC = Wild card
- LL = Lucky loser
- Alt = Alternate
- ITF = ITF entry
- PR = Protected ranking
- SR = Special ranking
- SE = Special exempt
- JE = Junior exempt
- JR = Junior Accelerator Programme entrant
- CO = College Accelerator Programme entrant
- NG = Next Gen Accelerator Program entrant
- w/o = Walkover
- r = Retired
- d = Defaulted

=== Draw ===
Quarterfinals
1	(United Kingdom) Alfie Hewett (United Kingdom) Gordon Reid	6	6
(France) Frédéric Cattaneo (Brazil) Daniel Rodrigues	0	2
(Netherlands) Tom Egberink (United States) Casey Ratzlaff	7	2	[9]
(France) Guilhem Laget (Japan) Takuya Miki	5	6	[11]
(Argentina) Gustavo Fernández (Japan) Tokito Oda	6	6
(China) Ji Zhenxu (Israel) Sergei Lysov	3	0
(Spain) Martín de la Puente (France) Stéphane Houdet	7	6
2	(Spain) Daniel Caverzaschi (Netherlands) Ruben Spaargaren	5	4

Semifinals
1	(United Kingdom) Alfie Hewett (United Kingdom) Gordon Reid	6	6
(France) Guilhem Laget (Japan) Takuya Miki	2	3
(Argentina) Gustavo Fernández (Japan) Tokito Oda
(Spain) Martín de la Puente (France) Stéphane Houdet	w/o

Final
1	(United Kingdom) Alfie Hewett (United Kingdom) Gordon Reid	6	6
(Spain) Martín de la Puente (France) Stéphane Houdet	2	3
