= 2026 French Open – Wheelchair women's doubles =

Tennis championship

Wheelchair women's doubles
- 2026 French Open

Final
- Champions: (Japan) Yui Kamiji (China) Zhu Zhenzhen
- Runners-up: (Netherlands) Jinte Bos (Netherlands) Lizzy de Greef
- Score: 6–3, 6–0
- Date: 5 June 2026

Details
- Draw: 8
- Seeds: 2

Events
Singles	men	women		boys	girls
Doubles	men	women	mixed	boys	girls
WC Singles	men	women	quad	boys	girls
WC Doubles	men	women	quad	boys	girls
- French Open

Defending champion Yui Kamiji and her partner Zhu Zhenzhen defeated Jinte Bos and Lizzy de Greef in the final, 6–3, 6–0 to win the women's doubles wheelchair tennis title at the 2026 French Open.

Kamiji and Kgothatso Montjane were the defending champions, but chose to compete with different partners. Montjane partnered Guo Luoyao, but lost in the quarterfinals to Li Xiaohui and Wang Ziying.

== Seeds ==
1. (Japan) Yui Kamiji / (China) Zhu Zhenzhen (champions)
2. (China) Li Xiaohui / (China) Wang Ziying (semifinals)

== Draw ==
Key

- Q = Qualifier
- WC = Wild card
- LL = Lucky loser
- Alt = Alternate
- ITF = ITF entry
- PR = Protected ranking
- SR = Special ranking
- SE = Special exempt
- JE = Junior exempt
- JR = Junior Accelerator Programme entrant
- CO = College Accelerator Programme entrant
- NG = Next Gen Accelerator Program entrant
- w/o = Walkover
- r = Retired
- d = Defaulted

=== Draw ===
Quarterfinals
1	(Japan) Yui Kamiji (China) Zhu Zhenzhen	6	6
(Colombia) Angélica Bernal (Netherlands) Jiske Griffioen	0	0
(Netherlands) Diede de Groot (Netherlands) Aniek van Koot	6	6
(France) Ksénia Chasteau (Japan) Manami Tanaka	0	2
(France) Pauline Déroulède (France) Charlotte Fairbank	4	1
(Netherlands) Jinte Bos (Netherlands) Lizzy de Greef	6	6
(China) Guo Luoyao (South Africa) Kgothatso Montjane	4	3
2	(China) Li Xiaohui (China) Wang Ziying	6	6

Semifinals
1	(Japan) Yui Kamiji (China) Zhu Zhenzhen	7^{7}	7
(Netherlands) Diede de Groot (Netherlands) Aniek van Koot	6^{4}	5
(Netherlands) Jinte Bos (Netherlands) Lizzy de Greef	6	2	[12]
2	(China) Li Xiaohui (China) Wang Ziying	3	6	[10]

Final
1	(Japan) Yui Kamiji (China) Zhu Zhenzhen	6	6
(Netherlands) Jinte Bos (Netherlands) Lizzy de Greef	3	0
