= Žiga Šeško =

Slovenian tennis player

- Country (sports): Slovenia
- Residence: Mallorca, Spain
- Born: 27 July 2008 (age 18) Hrastnik, Slovenia
- Height: 1.92 m (6 ft 4 in)
- Plays: Right-handed (two-handed backhand)
- Coach: Riccardo Piatti, Dejan Šeško
- Prize money: US $23,148

Singles
- Career record: 1–1 (at ATP Tour level, Grand Slam level, and in Davis Cup)
- Career titles: 0
- Highest ranking: No. 688 (14 September 2026)
- Current ranking: No. 699 (26 October 2026)

Grand Slam singles results
- Australian Open Junior: W (2026)
- French Open Junior: QF (2026)
- Wimbledon Junior: QF (2025)
- US Open Junior: 1R (2025, 2026)

Doubles
- Career record: 0–1 (at ATP Tour level, Grand Slam level, and in Davis Cup)
- Career titles: 0
- Highest ranking: No. 1,246 (8 June 2026)
- Current ranking: No. 2,154 (26 October 2026)

Grand Slam doubles results
- Australian Open Junior: QF (2026)
- French Open Junior: QF (2026)
- Wimbledon Junior: W (2026)
- US Open Junior: QF (2026)
- Last updated on: 26 October 2026.

Žiga Šeško (born 27 July 2008) is a Slovenian tennis player. He has a career-high ATP singles ranking of No. 688 achieved on 14 September 2026 and a doubles ranking of No. 1,246 achieved on 8 June 2026. Šeško won the singles title at the 2026 Australian Open and the 2026 Wimbledon doubles title, becoming the first Slovenian player to win a Junior Grand Slam title.

== Early life ==
Šeško was born and raised in Hrastnik, Slovenia. His father, Dejan Šeško, is a former table tennis player who introduced Žiga to tennis. He is a distant relative of Slovenian professional footballer Benjamin Šeško; although the two do not know each other personally, their families originate from neighboring towns in the Zasavje region.

== Juniors ==
In December 2025, Šeško won the prestigious Orange Bowl in the boys' doubles, playing alongside Yannik Álvarez.

In January 2026, Šeško won the doubles category at J300 Traralgon International, Australia, with Luís Guto Miguel. His best result at junior-level came two weeks later, when he was crowned a champion at the Australian Open Boys' singles, with victories over second seed and doubles partner Luís Guto Miguel, third seed Ryo Tabata, and fourth seed Keaton Hance, winning the final in three sets, 4–6, 6–3, 6–4. Seeded seventh, he became the first Slovenian player in history to win a boys' final in either singles or doubles in any Grand Slam tournament.

Šeško has good results on the ITF junior circuit, holding a singles win-loss record of 110–57 as of February 2026. He reached an ITF junior combined ranking of world No. 3 on 26 October 2026.

== Professional ==
Šeško reached his first professional singles final in November 2025 at the M15 tournament in San Gregorio di Catania, Italy. He defeated top seed Gabriele Pennaforti in the quarterfinals before losing the final to Gianmarco Ferrari in straight sets.

In the M15 tournament in Wels, Austria, Šeško collected his first professional singles title in August 2026 by defeating Erik Schiessl in the final, 7--6(4), 6--4. Two weeks later, he reached another M15 final in Trier, Germany.

He won his first doubles title in June 2024 at the M15 in Hrastnik, partnering with Nik Razboršek. He claimed his second title in June 2025 at the M15 Ljubljana, playing alongside Jan Kupčič. In 2026, Šeško was entered as a wildcard in the qualifying draw in Mallorca. He made his ATP debut having also received a wildcard for the main draw draw at the 2026 Croatia Open Umag.

== Personal life ==
Šeško trained at Gimnazija Litija (Litija Grammar School), completing his education remotely to accommodate his training schedule. He was previously based in Bordighera, Italy, where he trained at the Piatti Tennis Center under coach Riccardo Piatti. After winning the 2026 Australian Open, he began training at the Rafa Nadal Academy in Mallorca.

== ITF World Tennis Tour finals ==
=== Singles: 3 (1 title, 2 runner-ups) ===
Finals by surface
Hard (–)
Clay (1–2)

Result	W–L	Date	Tournament	Surface	Opponent	Score
Loss	0–1	Nov 2025	M15 San Gregorio di Catania, Italy	Clay	(Italy) Gianmarco Ferrari	4–6, 2–6
Win	1–1	Jul 2026	M15 Wels, Austria	Clay	(Germany) Erik Schiessl	7–6^{(7–4)}, 6–4
Loss	1–2	Aug 2026	M15 Trier, Germany	Clay	(Republic of Ireland) Michael Agwi	2–6, 1–6

=== Doubles: 2 (2 titles) ===
Finals by surface
Hard (–)
Clay (2–0)

Result	W–L	Date	Tournament	Surface	Partner	Opponents	Score
Win	1–0	Jun 2024	M15 Hrastnik, Slovenia	Clay	(Slovenia) Nik Razboršek	(Slovenia) Jan Kupčič (Croatia) Nikola Bašić	7–6^{(7–4)}, 6–4
Win	2–0	Jun 2025	M15 Ljubljana, Slovenia	Clay	(Slovenia) Jan Kupčič	(France) Théo Papamalamis (Ukraine) Glib Sekachov	6–3, 6–3

== Junior Grand Slam finals ==
=== Singles: 1 (title) ===
Result	Year	Tournament	Surface	Opponent	Score
Win	2026	Australian Open	Hard	(United States) Keaton Hance	4–6, 6–3, 6–4

=== Doubles: 1 (title) ===
Resu	Year	Tournament	Surface	Partner	Opponents	Score
Win	2026	Wimbledon	Grass	(Brazil) Luís Guto Miguel	(United States) Michael Antonius (United States) Andrew Johnson	6–1, 6–4

== National representation ==
=== Davis Cup: 2 (1 victory, 1 loss) ===
Group membership World Group (–) World Group I (0–1) World Group II (1–0)	Matches by surface Hard (1–0) Clay (0–1) Grass (–)	Matches by type Singles (1–0) Doubles (0–1)

- ▲ ▼ indicates the outcome of the Davis Cup match followed by the score, date, place of event, the zonal classification and its phase, and the court surface.

Result	Rubber	Match type (partner if any)	Opponent nation	Opponent player(s)	Score
▲4–1; 12–13 September 2025; Tennis Academy Breskvar, Ljubljana, Slovenia; World Group II; hard surface
Win	IV	Singles	Uruguay	Francisco Llanes	1–6, 7–6^{(7–4)}, 10–7
▼1–3; 6–7 February 2026; Bela dvorana, Velenje, Slovenia; World Group I play-offs; clay surface (i)
Loss	III	Doubles (w Filip Jeff Planinšek)	Turkey	Ergi Kırkın; Kerem Yılmaz	6–7^{(3–7)}, 3–6
