= 2026 French Open – Girls' doubles =

Tennis championship

Girls' doubles
- 2026 French Open

Final
- Champions: (Czech Republic) Jana Kovačková (Czech Republic) Kateřina Zajíčková
- Runners-up: (United States) Jordyn Hazelitt (United States) Welles Newman
- Score: 6–1, 6–4
- Date: 6 June 2026

Details
- Draw: 32
- Seeds: 8

Events
| Singles | men | women | | boys | girls |
| Doubles | men | women | mixed | boys | girls |
| WC Singles | men | women | quad | boys | girls |
| WC Doubles | men | women | quad | boys | girls |
- French Open

Jana Kovačková and Kateřina Zajíčková won the girls' doubles title at the 2026 French Open, defeating Jordyn Hazelitt and Welles Newman in the final 6–1, 6–4.

Eva Bennemann and Sonja Zhenikhova were the defending champions, but only Zhenikhova chose to compete, partnering Sol Ailin Larraya Guidi. They lost in the second round to Luna María Cinalli and Lee Ha-eum.

== Seeds ==
1. (Brazil) Victoria Luiza Barros / (Spain) Paola Piñera Celorio (quarterfinals)
2. (Spain) Charo Esquiva Bañuls / (Brazil) Nauhany Vitória Leme da Silva (second round)
3. (Serbia) Anastasija Cvetković / (United States) Thea Frodin (quarterfinals)
4. (China) Sun Xinran / (China) Zhang Ruien (semifinals)
5. Felitsata Dorofeeva-Rybas / Anna Pushkareva (quarterfinals)
6. (Ukraine) Polina Skliar / (Germany) Mariella Thamm (second round)
7. (Latvia) Adelina Lachinova / (Romania) Giulia Safina Popa (first round)
8. (United States) Jordyn Hazelitt / (United States) Welles Newman (final)

== Draw ==
Key

- Q = Qualifier
- WC = Wild card
- LL = Lucky loser
- Alt = Alternate
- ITF = ITF entry
- PR = Protected ranking
- SR = Special ranking
- SE = Special exempt
- JE = Junior exempt
- JR = Junior Accelerator Programme entrant
- CO = College Accelerator Programme entrant
- NG = Next Gen Accelerator Program entrant
- w/o = Walkover
- r = Retired
- d = Defaulted

=== Finals ===
Semifinals
8 | (United States) Jordyn Hazelitt (United States) Welles Newman | 6 | 6
4 | (China) Sun Xinran (China) Zhang Ruien | 4 | 3
(Czech Republic) Jana Kovačková (Czech Republic) Kateřina Zajíčková | 6 | 6
(Argentina) Luna María Cinalli (South Korea) Lee Ha-eum | 3 | 1

Final
8 | (United States) Jordyn Hazelitt (United States) Welles Newman | 1 | 4
(Czech Republic) Jana Kovačková (Czech Republic) Kateřina Zajíčková | 6 | 6

=== Top half ===
First round
1 | (Brazil) Victoria Luiza Barros (Spain) Paola Piñera Celorio | 6 | 6
WC | (France) Daniel Baranes (France) Ninon Carpentier | 4 | 2
Ekaterina Dotsenko (Italy) Ilary Pistola | 6 | 6
(Czech Republic) Tereza Heřmanová (Czech Republic) Denisa Žoldáková | 3 | 4
(South Korea) Jeong Ui-su (Brazil) Pietra Rivoli | 6 | 0
(Canada) Nadia Lagaev (Ukraine) Antonina Sushkova | 2 | 0^{r}
Alexandra Malova; Alisa Terentyeva | 3 | 3
8 | (United States) Jordyn Hazelitt (United States) Welles Newman | 6 | 6
4 | (China) Sun Xinran (China) Zhang Ruien | 6 | 6
(Australia) Renee Alame (Czech Republic) Sofie Hettlerová | 3 | 1
WC | (France) Daphnée Mpetshi Perricard (France) Nehira Sanon | 3 | 3
(United States) Chukwumelije Clarke (United States) Olivia Traynor | 6 | 6
(China) Lin Yujun (Chinese Taipei) Lin Yu-chen | 7 | 7^{7}
(Romania) Maia Ilinca Burcescu (Jamaica) Alyssa James | 5 | 6^{3}
(Ukraine) Sofiia Bielinska (Germany) Emily Eigelsbach | 4 | 3
5 | Felitsata Dorofeeva-Rybas; Anna Pushkareva | 6 | 6

Second round
1 | (Brazil) VL Barros (Spain) P Piñera Celorio | 6 | 6
E Dotsenko (Italy) I Pistola | 3 | 2
(South Korea) U-s Jeong (Brazil) P Rivoli | 4 | 3
8 | (United States) J Hazelitt (United States) W Newman | 6 | 6
4 | (China) X Sun (China) R Zhang | 6 | 3 | [10]
(United States) C Clarke (United States) O Traynor | 2 | 6 | [8]
(China) Y Lin (Chinese Taipei) Y–c Lin | 3 | 4
5 | F Dorofeeva-Rybas; A Pushkareva | 6 | 6

Quarterfinals
1 | (Brazil) VL Barros (Spain) P Piñera Celorio | 6 | 6^{4} | [8]
8 | (United States) J Hazelitt (United States) W Newman | 4 | 7^{7} | [10]
4 | (China) X Sun (China) R Zhang | 6 | 6
5 | F Dorofeeva-Rybas; A Pushkareva | 3 | 4

Semifinals
8 | (United States) J Hazelitt (United States) W Newman | 6 | 6
4 | (China) X Sun (China) R Zhang | 4 | 3

=== Bottom half ===
First round
6 | (Ukraine) Polina Skliar (Germany) Mariella Thamm | 7 | 6
(United States) Carrie-Anne Hoo (United States) Sarah Ye | 5 | 3
(Czech Republic) Jana Kovačková (Czech Republic) Kateřina Zajíčková | 6 | 6
WC | (France) Eleejah Inisan (France) Cindy Langlais | 0 | 2
(Latvia) Marija Lauva (Germany) Ida Wobker | 2 | 4
(China) Shao Yushan (China) Wei Zhangqian | 6 | 6
Anastasia Lizunova (China) Qu Yihan | 4 | 2
3 | (Serbia) Anastasija Cvetković (United States) Thea Frodin | 6 | 6
7 | (Latvia) Adelina Lachinova (Romania) Giulia Safina Popa | 5 | 2
(Argentina) Sol Ailin Larraya Guidi (Germany) Sonja Zhenikhova | 7 | 6
(United States) Lani Chang (United States) Janae Preston | 2 | 6^{1}
(Argentina) Luna María Cinalli (South Korea) Lee Ha-eum | 6 | 7^{7}
(Sweden) Lea Nilsson (United Kingdom) Hollie Smart | 7^{7} | 7^{10}
Mariia Makarova; Ekaterina Tupitsyna | 6^{2} | 6^{8}
WC | (France) Mila Bastianelli (France) Capucine Cedillo-Vayson de Pradenne | 1 | 2
2 | (Spain) Charo Esquiva Bañuls (Brazil) Nauhany Vitória Leme da Silva | 6 | 6

Second round
6 | (Ukraine) P Skliar (Germany) M Thamm | 1 | 1
(Czech Republic) J Kovačková (Czech Republic) K Zajíčková | 6 | 6
(China) Y Shao (China) Z Wei | 2 | 6^{5}
3 | (Serbia) A Cvetković (United States) T Frodin | 6 | 7^{7}
(Argentina) SA Larraya Guidi (Germany) S Zhenikhova | 2 | 6^{2}
(Argentina) LM Cinalli (South Korea) H-e Lee | 6 | 7^{7}
(Sweden) L Nilsson (United Kingdom) H Smart | 7^{7} | 6^{4} | [10]
2 | (Spain) C Esquiva Bañuls (Brazil) NV Leme da Silva | 6^{2} | 7^{7} | [4]

Quarterfinals
(Czech Republic) J Kovačková (Czech Republic) K Zajíčková | 6 | 6
3 | (Serbia) A Cvetković (United States) T Frodin | 3 | 1
(Argentina) LM Cinalli (South Korea) H-e Lee | 6 | 6
(Sweden) L Nilsson (United Kingdom) H Smart | 3 | 2

Semifinals
(Czech Republic) J Kovačková (Czech Republic) K Zajíčková | 6 | 6
(Argentina) LM Cinalli (South Korea) H-e Lee | 3 | 1
