= Jinte Bos =

Dutch wheelchair tennis player

- Born: 4 September 2002 (age 24) Zaltbommel, Netherlands
- Plays: Right-handed (one-handed backhand)

Singles
- Career titles: 5
- Highest ranking: No. 19 (10 February 2025)

Grand Slam singles results
- Australian Open: 1R (2026)
- French Open: 1R (2026)
- Wimbledon: QF (2026)

Other tournaments
- Paralympic Games: 1R (2024)

Doubles
- Career titles: 13
- Highest ranking: No. 15 (24 February 2025)

Grand Slam doubles results
- Australian Open: QF (2026)
- French Open: F (2026)

Other doubles tournaments
- Paralympic Games: QF (2024)

Jinte Bos (born 4 September 2002) is a Dutch wheelchair tennis player, she was a former world junior number two in 2019. She competed at the 2024 Summer Paralympics where she reached the quarterfinals in the women's doubles alongside Lizzy de Greef.

Bos was born with hip dysplasia and scoliosis.
