= 2026 French Open – Wheelchair girls' singles =

Tennis championship

Wheelchair girls' singles
- 2026 French Open

Final
- Champion: (Belgium) Luna Gryp
- Runner-up: (Japan) Seira Matsuoka
- Score: 6–2, 6–2
- Date: 5 June 2026

Details
- Draw: 4
- Seeds: 2

Events
Singles	men	women		boys	girls
Doubles	men	women	mixed	boys	girls
WC Singles	men	women	quad	boys	girls
WC Doubles	men	women	quad	boys	girls
- French Open

Vitória Miranda is the defending champion.

== Seeds ==
1. (Belgium) Luna Gryp (champion)
2. (Japan) Seira Matsuoka (final)

== Draw ==
Key

- Q = Qualifier
- WC = Wild card
- LL = Lucky loser
- Alt = Alternate
- ITF = ITF entry
- PR = Protected ranking
- SR = Special ranking
- SE = Special exempt
- JE = Junior exempt
- JR = Junior Accelerator Programme entrant
- CO = College Accelerator Programme entrant
- NG = Next Gen Accelerator Program entrant
- w/o = Walkover
- r = Retired
- d = Defaulted

=== Draw ===
Semifinals
1	(Belgium) Luna Gryp	6	7
(Colombia) Paula Michelle Lopez Meza	4	5
(United States) Lucy Heald	1	0
2	(Japan) Seira Matsuoka	6	6

Final
1	(Belgium) Luna Gryp	6	6
2	(Japan) Seira Matsuoka	2	2
