= 2026 French Open – Wheelchair boys' doubles =

Tennis championship

Wheelchair boys' doubles
- 2026 French Open

Final
- Champions: (United Kingdom) Matthew Knoesen (Belgium) Alexander Lantermann
- Runners-up: (United Kingdom) Will Barton (United Kingdom) Lucas John De Gouveia
- Score: 6–4, 6–3
- Date: 5 June 2026

Details
- Draw: 2

Events
Singles	men	women		boys	girls
Doubles	men	women	mixed	boys	girls
WC Singles	men	women	quad	boys	girls
WC Doubles	men	women	quad	boys	girls
- French Open

Charlie Cooper and Maximilian Taucher are the defending champions.

== Draw ==
Key

- Q = Qualifier
- WC = Wild card
- LL = Lucky loser
- Alt = Alternate
- ITF = ITF entry
- PR = Protected ranking
- SR = Special ranking
- SE = Special exempt
- JE = Junior exempt
- JR = Junior Accelerator Programme entrant
- CO = College Accelerator Programme entrant
- NG = Next Gen Accelerator Program entrant
- w/o = Walkover
- r = Retired
- d = Defaulted

=== Final ===
Final
(United Kingdom) Matthew Knoesen (Belgium) Alexander Lantermann	6	6
(United Kingdom) Will Barton (United Kingdom) Lucas John De Gouveia	4	3
