= 2026 French Open – Wheelchair quad singles =

Tennis championship

Wheelchair quad singles
- 2026 French Open

Final
- Champion: (Netherlands) Niels Vink
- Runner-up: (Turkey) Ahmet Kaplan
- Score: 6–3, 6–4
- Date: 6 June 2026

Details
- Draw: 8
- Seeds: 2

Events
Singles	men	women		boys	girls
Doubles	men	women	mixed	boys	girls
WC Singles	men	women	quad	boys	girls
WC Doubles	men	women	quad	boys	girls
- French Open

Niels Vink defeated Ahmet Kaplan in the final, 6–3, 6–4 to win the quad singles wheelchair tennis title at the 2026 French Open. It was his third French Open singles title and ninth major singles title overall, completing a non-calendar year Grand Slam (having won the preceding Wimbledon Championships, US Open, and Australian Open).

Guy Sasson was the two time defending champion, but lost in the semifinals to Vink.

== Seeds ==
1. (Netherlands) Sam Schröder (semifinals)
2. (Netherlands) Niels Vink (champion)

== Draw ==
Key

- Q = Qualifier
- WC = Wild card
- LL = Lucky loser
- Alt = Alternate
- ITF = ITF entry
- PR = Protected ranking
- SR = Special ranking
- SE = Special exempt
- JE = Junior exempt
- JR = Junior Accelerator Programme entrant
- CO = College Accelerator Programme entrant
- NG = Next Gen Accelerator Program entrant
- w/o = Walkover
- r = Retired
- d = Defaulted

=== Draw ===
Quarterfinals
1	(Netherlands) Sam Schröder	6	6
(Argentina) Gonzalo Enrique Lazarte	1	3
(Turkey) Ahmet Kaplan	6	6
WC	(United Kingdom) Gregory Slade	0	0
(Israel) Guy Sasson	6	6
(Australia) Jin Woodman	2	2
(United Kingdom) Andy Lapthorne	3	2
2	(Netherlands) Niels Vink	6	6

Semifinals
1	(Netherlands) Sam Schröder	4	6	1
(Turkey) Ahmet Kaplan	6	4	6
(Israel) Guy Sasson	2	0
2	(Netherlands) Niels Vink	6	6

Final
(Turkey) Ahmet Kaplan	3	4
2	(Netherlands) Niels Vink	6	6
