= 2026 French Open – Boys' doubles =

Tennis championship

Boys' doubles
- 2026 French Open

Final
- Champions: (Germany) Jamie Mackenzie (Germany) Vincent Reisach
- Runners-up: (France) Mathys Domenc (France) Daniel Jade
- Score: 6–1, 6–4
- Date: 6 June 2026

Details
- Draw: 32
- Seeds: 8

Events
Singles	men	women		boys	girls
Doubles	men	women	mixed	boys	girls
WC Singles	men	women	quad	boys	girls
WC Doubles	men	women	quad	boys	girls
- French Open

Jamie Mackenzie and Vincent Reisach won the boys' doubles title at the 2026 French Open, defeating Mathys Domenc and Daniel Jade in the final, 6–1, 6–4.

Oskari Paldanius and Alan Ważny were the defending champions, but were no longer eligible to participate in junior events.

== Seeds ==
1. (Brazil) Guto Miguel / (Slovenia) Žiga Šeško (quarterfinals)
2. (United States) Keaton Hance / (United States) Jack Kennedy (semifinals)
3. (France) Yannick Theodor Alexandrescou / (Japan) Ryo Tabata (first round)
4. (Austria) Thilo Behrmann / (Chinese Taipei) Chen Kuan-shou (second round)
5. (Peru) Nicolas Baena / (Spain) Tito Chávez (quarterfinals)
6. (Puerto Rico) Yannik Álvarez / (United States) Jack Secord (semifinals)
7. (Kazakhstan) Zangar Nurlanuly / Savva Rybkin (first round)
8. (Germany) Jamie Mackenzie / (Germany) Vincent Reisach (champions)

== Draw ==
Key

- Q = Qualifier
- WC = Wild card
- LL = Lucky loser
- Alt = Alternate
- ITF = ITF entry
- PR = Protected ranking
- SR = Special ranking
- SE = Special exempt
- JE = Junior exempt
- JR = Junior Accelerator Programme entrant
- CO = College Accelerator Programme entrant
- NG = Next Gen Accelerator Program entrant
- w/o = Walkover
- r = Retired
- d = Defaulted

=== Finals ===
Semifinals
6	(Puerto Rico) Yannik Álvarez (United States) Jack Secord	5	2
8	(Germany) Jamie Mackenzie (Germany) Vincent Reisach	7	6
(France) Mathys Domenc (France) Daniel Jade	6	6
2	(United States) Keaton Hance (United States) Jack Kennedy	3	4

Final
8	(Germany) Jamie Mackenzie (Germany) Vincent Reisach	6	6
(France) Mathys Domenc (France) Daniel Jade	1	4

=== Top half ===
First round
1	(Brazil) Guto Miguel (Slovenia) Žiga Šeško	6	6
(Ecuador) Emilio Camacho (Latvia) Rihards Neimanis	3	1
(Thailand) Kunanan Pantaratorn (India) Arnav Paparkar	7^{9}	6
(United Kingdom) Mark Ceban; Kirill Filaretov	6^{7}	2
WC	(France) Evan Giurescu (France) Mario Vukovic	2	6	[3]
(Colombia) Juan Miguel Bolívar Idárraga (Brazil) Pedro Henrique Chabalgoity	6	3	[10]
(Uzbekistan) Nikita Belozertsev (Hong Kong) Kai Thompson	7	6^{1}	[7]
6	(Puerto Rico) Yannik Álvarez (United States) Jack Secord	5	7^{7}	[10]
4	(Austria) Thilo Behrmann (Chinese Taipei) Chen Kuan-shou	6	6
WC	(France) Benoît Geldof (France) Pablo Pradat	2	4
(United States) Michael Antonius (United Kingdom) Rhys Lawlor	6	6^{6}	[8]
(Italy) Raffaele Ciurnelli (Slovakia) Leon Sloboda	4	7^{8}	[10]
(United States) Ryan Cozad (United States) Gavin Goode	7	4	[4]
WC	(France) Aaron Gabet (France) Mickaël Kaouk	5	6	[10]
(Turkey) Kaan Işık Koşaner; Marat Salbiev	3	1
8	(Germany) Jamie Mackenzie (Germany) Vincent Reisach	6	6

Second round
1	(Brazil) G Miguel (Slovenia) Ž Šeško	6	6
(Thailand) K Pantaratorn (India) A Paparkar	3	3
(Colombia) JM Bolívar Idárraga (Brazil) PH Chabalgoity	2	4
6	(Puerto Rico) Y Álvarez (United States) J Secord	6	6
4	(Austria) T Behrmann (Chinese Taipei) K-s Chen	3	5
(Italy) R Ciurnelli (Slovakia) L Sloboda	6	7
WC	(France) A Gabet (France) M Kaouk	7^{7}	2	[4]
8	(Germany) J Mackenzie (Germany) V Reisach	6^{2}	6	[10]

Quarterfinals
1	(Brazil) G Miguel (Slovenia) Ž Šeško	6	2	[6]
6	(Puerto Rico) Y Álvarez (United States) J Secord	2	6	[10]
(Italy) R Ciurnelli (Slovakia) L Sloboda	6^{5}	2
8	(Germany) J Mackenzie (Germany) V Reisach	7^{7}	6

Semifinals
6	(Puerto Rico) Y Álvarez (United States) J Secord	5	2
8	(Germany) J Mackenzie (Germany) V Reisach	7	6

=== Bottom half ===
First round
7	(Kazakhstan) Zangar Nurlanuly; Savva Rybkin	4	3
(Australia) Daniel Jovanovski (Australia) Mustafa Ege Şık	6	6
(United States) Safir Azam (Israel) Dan Brand	6	6
(Romania) Matei Todoran (Kazakhstan) Damir Zhalgasbay	4	1
(Germany) Oliver Majdandžić (Germany) Christopher Thies	6	4	[4]
(France) Mathys Domenc (France) Daniel Jade	3	6	[10]
(United States) Andrew Johnson (United States) Tanishk Konduri	3	6	[10]
3	(France) Yannick Theodor Alexandrescou (Japan) Ryo Tabata	6	4	[2]
5	(Peru) Nicolas Baena (Spain) Tito Chávez	6	3	[10]
(Japan) Motoharu Abe (Romania) Matei Victor Chelemen	4	6	[8]
(South Africa) Connor Doig (Bulgaria) Dimitar Kisimov	6	6
(France) Damien Clerc (France) Matisse Martin	3	2
(Japan) Hyu Kawanishi (Japan) Kanta Watanabe	4	6^{5}
(Brazil) Leonardo Storck França (Switzerland) Flynn Thomas	6	7^{7}
(Spain) Valentín González-Galiño (Italy) Simone Massellani	6	6^{2}	[7]
2	(United States) Keaton Hance (United States) Jack Kennedy	3	7^{7}	[10]

Second round
(Australia) D Jovanovski (Australia) ME Şık	6	5	[2]
(United States) S Azam (Israel) D Brand	2	7	[10]
(France) M Domenc (France) D Jade	6	7
(United States) A Johnson (United States) T Konduri	4	5
5	(Peru) N Baena (Spain) T Chávez	2	6	[10]
(South Africa) C Doig (Bulgaria) D Kisimov	6	3	[4]
(Brazil) L Storck França (Switzerland) F Thomas	4	1
2	(United States) K Hance (United States) J Kennedy	6	6

Quarterfinals
(United States) S Azam (Israel) D Brand	6	2	[7]
(France) M Domenc (France) D Jade	3	6	[10]
5	(Peru) N Baena (Spain) T Chávez	3	4
2	(United States) K Hance (United States) J Kennedy	6	6

Semifinals
(France) M Domenc (France) D Jade	6	6
2	(United States) K Hance (United States) J Kennedy	3	4
