= 2026 French Open – Boys' singles =

Tennis championship

Boys' singles
- 2026 French Open

Final
- Champion: (Brazil) Luís Guto Miguel
- Runner-up: (United States) Michael Antonius
- Score: 6–3, 6–4
- Date: 6 June 2026

Details
- Draw: 64
- Seeds: 16

Events
Singles	men	women		boys	girls
Doubles	men	women	mixed	boys	girls
WC Singles	men	women	quad	boys	girls
WC Doubles	men	women	quad	boys	girls
- French Open

Luís Guto Miguel defeated Michael Antonius in the final 6–3, 6–4 to win the boys' singles title at the 2026 French Open.

Niels McDonald was the reigning champion, but chose not to participate.

== Seeds ==
1. (Brazil) Luís Guto Miguel (champion)
2. (France) Yannick Theodor Alexandrescou (third round)
3. (Germany) Jamie Mackenzie (quarterfinals)
4. (United States) Jack Kennedy (quarterfinals)
5. (Slovenia) Žiga Šeško (quarterfinals)
6. (United States) Keaton Hance (semifinals)
7. (Austria) Thilo Behrmann (quarterfinals)
8. (Kazakhstan) Zangar Nurlanuly (third round)
9. (Bulgaria) Dimitar Kisimov (second round)
10. (Japan) Ryo Tabata (second round)
11. (United States) Andrew Johnson (first round)
12. (Puerto Rico) Yannik Álvarez (second round)
13. (United States) Michael Antonius (final)
14. (Argentina) Dante Pagani (first round)
15. (Chinese Taipei) Chen Kuan-shou (second round)
16. (Peru) Nicolás Baena (third round)

Click on the seed number of a player to go to their draw section.

== Draw ==
Key

- Q = Qualifier
- WC = Wild card
- LL = Lucky loser
- Alt = Alternate
- ITF = ITF entry
- PR = Protected ranking
- SR = Special ranking
- SE = Special exempt
- JE = Junior exempt
- JR = Junior Accelerator Programme entrant
- CO = College Accelerator Programme entrant
- NG = Next Gen Accelerator Program entrant
- w/o = Walkover
- r = Retired
- d = Defaulted

=== Finals ===
Quarterfinals
1	(Brazil) Luís Guto Miguel	6	1	6
7	(Austria) Thilo Behrmann	4	6	3
4	(United States) Jack Kennedy	3	6^{1}
WC	(Brazil) Leonardo Storck França	6	7^{7}
6	(United States) Keaton Hance	6	5	7^{10}
3	(Germany) Jamie Mackenzie	3	7	6^{6}
5	(Slovenia) Žiga Šeško	2	1
13	(United States) Michael Antonius	6	6

Semifinals
1	(Brazil) Luís Guto Miguel	6	3	6
WC	(Brazil) Leonardo Storck França	1	6	2
6	(United States) Keaton Hance	3	1
13	(United States) Michael Antonius	6	6

Final
1	(Brazil) Luís Guto Miguel	6	6
13	(United States) Michael Antonius	3	4

=== Top half ===
==== Section 1 ====
First round
1	(Brazil) Luís Guto Miguel	6	6
(Japan) Hyu Kawanishi	3	1
Savva Rybkin	2	2
(United States) Ryan Cozad	6	6
WC	(France) Ferdinand Livet Novkirichka	7	6
(Colombia) Juan Miguel Bolívar Idárraga	5	2
(Slovakia) Leon Sloboda	6	6^{3}	3
16	(Peru) Nicolás Baena	4	7^{7}	6
11	(United States) Andrew Johnson	2	4
(Italy) Raffaele Ciurnelli	6	6
(France) Mathys Domenc	3	7	6
SE	(Israel) Dan Brand	6	5	1
(United States) Tanishk Konduri	2	4
Q	(Germany) Oliver Majdandžić	6	6
WC	(France) Benoît Geldof	2	2
7	(Austria) Thilo Behrmann	6	6

Second round
1	(Brazil) L Guto Miguel	6	7^{7}
(United States) R Cozad	3	6^{4}
WC	(France) F Livet Novkirichka	6^{4}	4
16	(Peru) N Baena	7^{7}	6
(Italy) R Ciurnelli	4	2
(France) M Domenc	6	6
Q	(Germany) O Majdandžić	3	1
7	(Austria) T Behrmann	6	6

Third round
1	(Brazil) L Guto Miguel	6	6
16	(Peru) N Baena	4	4
(France) M Domenc	0	6^{2}
7	(Austria) T Behrmann	6	7^{7}

Quarterfinals
1	(Brazil) L Guto Miguel	6	1	6
7	(Austria) T Behrmann	4	6	3

==== Section 2 ====
First round
4	(United States) Jack Kennedy	7^{7}	6
(Ecuador) Emilio Camacho	6^{4}	2
(France) Daniel Jade	6	6
(Spain) Valentín González-Galiño	3	4
(India) Arnav Paparkar	7^{7}	6
(Germany) Vincent Reisach	6^{4}	4
SE	(Romania) Matei Victor Chelemen	4	6^{3}
15	(Chinese Taipei) Chen Kuan-shou	6	7^{7}
12	(Puerto Rico) Yannik Álvarez	6	6
(Australia) Daniel Jovanovski	2	2
WC	(France) Pablo Pradat	4	0
WC	(Brazil) Leonardo Storck França	6	6
JGSE	(Japan) Motoharu Abe	4	5
Q	(United States) Agassi Rusher	6	7
(United Kingdom) Mark Ceban	3	4
8	(Kazakhstan) Zangar Nurlanuly	6	6

Second round
4	(United States) J Kennedy	6	6
(France) D Jade	4	3
(India) A Paparkar	6	6
15	(Chinese Taipei) K-s Chen	2	4
12	(Puerto Rico) Y Álvarez	3	6	6^{6}
WC	(Brazil) LS França	6	4	7^{10}
Q	(United States) A Rusher	2	1
8	(Kazakhstan) Z Nurlanuly	6	6

Third round
4	(United States) J Kennedy	7	6
(India) A Paparkar	5	2
WC	(Brazil) LS França	3	7^{7}	7
8	(Kazakhstan) Z Nurlanuly	6	6^{3}	5

Quarterfinals
4	(United States) J Kennedy	3	6^{1}
WC	(Brazil) LS França	6	7^{7}

=== Bottom half ===
==== Section 3 ====
First round
6	(United States) Keaton Hance	6	3	6
Q	Marat Salbiev	3	6	1
Q	(Australia) Mustafa Ege Şık	3	5
(Brazil) Pedro Henrique Chabalgoity	6	7
Q	(Turkey) Kaan Işık Koşaner	2	6	6
WC	(France) Mickaël Kaouk	6	3	2
(Italy) Simone Massellani	4	4
10	(Japan) Ryo Tabata	6	6
14	(Argentina) Dante Pagani	4	6	3
WC	(France) Matisse Martin	6	1	6
(United States) Jack Secord	6	3	1
(Switzerland) Flynn Thomas	1	6	6
WC	(France) Timéo Trufelli	6	3	6^{4}
(Romania) Matei Todoran	4	6	7^{10}
Q	(United States) Safir Azam	6	4	2
3	(Germany) Jamie Mackenzie	1	6	6

Second round
6	(United States) K Hance	6	6
(Brazil) PH Chabalgoity	4	2
Q	(Turkey) KI Koşaner	6	2	6
10	(Japan) R Tabata	0	6	4
WC	(France) M Martin	6^{3}	3
(Switzerland) F Thomas	7^{7}	6
(Romania) M Todoran	1	3
3	(Germany) J Mackenzie	6	6

Third round
6	(United States) K Hance	6	6
Q	(Turkey) KI Koşaner	1	1
(Switzerland) F Thomas	6	0	2
3	(Germany) J Mackenzie	4	6	6

Quarterfinals
6	(United States) K Hance	6	5	7^{10}
3	(Germany) J Mackenzie	3	7	6^{6}

==== Section 4 ====
First round
5	(Slovenia) Žiga Šeško	6	6
(Spain) Tito Chávez	3	4
(Latvia) Rihards Neimanis	6^{4}	6	6
Q	(Germany) Christopher Thies	7^{7}	3	4
(United States) Gavin Goode	1	0^{r}
(South Africa) Connor Doig	6	2
WC	(France) Aaron Gabet	5	1
9	(Bulgaria) Dimitar Kisimov	7	6
13	(United States) Michael Antonius	7	6
Kirill Filaretov	5	0
Q	(United Kingdom) Rhys Lawlor	7	2	2
(Japan) Kanta Watanabe	5	6	6
(Uzbekistan) Nikita Belozertsev	4	7^{7}	6
(Hong Kong) Kai Thompson	6	6^{5}	0
(Kazakhstan) Damir Zhalgasbay	2	3
2	(France) Yannick Theodor Alexandrescou	6	6

Second round
5	(Slovenia) Ž Šeško	6	6
(Latvia) R Neimanis	4	3
(South Africa) C Doig	6	7
9	(Bulgaria) D Kisimov	4	5
13	(United States) M Antonius	6	6
(Japan) K Watanabe	3	0
(Uzbekistan) N Belozertsev	6	3	4
2	(France) YT Alexandrescou	3	6	6

Third round
5	(Slovenia) Ž Šeško	6	6
(South Africa) C Doig	3	2
13	(United States) M Antonius	6	6
2	(France) YT Alexandrescou	2	4

Quarterfinals
5	(Slovenia) Ž Šeško	2	1
13	(United States) M Antonius	6	6

== Qualifying ==
=== Seeds ===
1. (Canada) Benjamin Azar (first round)
2. (Poland) Jan Sadzik (qualifying competition)
3. (United States) Safir Azam (qualified)
4. (Spain) Eudald González (first round)
5. (South Africa) John Bothma (first round)
6. (Thailand) Kunanan Pantaratorn (first round)
7. (Australia) Mustafa Ege Şık (qualified)
8. (Botswana) Ntungamili Raguin (qualifying competition)
9. (Spain) Maxi Carrascosa Díaz (qualifying competition)
10. (Canada) Xavier Massotte (first round)
11. Marat Salbiev (qualified)
12. (United Kingdom) Rhys Lawlor (qualified)
13. (Germany) Christopher Thies (qualified)
14. (Poland) Aleksander Błuś (first round)
15. (Nigeria) Oluwaseun Peter Ogunsakin (qualifying competition)
16. (Canada) Felix Roussel (qualifying competition)

=== Qualifiers ===
1. (United Kingdom) Rhys Lawlor
2. (Turkey) Kaan Işık Koşaner
3. (United States) Safir Azam
4. (Germany) Oliver Majdandžić
5. (United States) Agassi Rusher
6. (Germany) Christopher Thies
7. (Australia) Mustafa Ege Şık
8. Marat Salbiev

=== Draw ===
==== First qualifier ====
First round
1	(Canada) Benjamin Azar	4	4
(Australia) Jake Dembo	6	6
WC	(France) Damien Clerc	6	2	3
12	(United Kingdom) Rhys Lawlor	4	6	6

Qualifying competition
(Australia) Jake Dembo	1	1
12	(United Kingdom) Rhys Lawlor	6	6

==== Second qualifier ====
First round
2	(Poland) Jan Sadzik	6	6
(South Korea) Cho Min-hyuk	1	3
(Turkey) Kaan Işık Koşaner	2	6	6
10	(Canada) Xavier Massotte	6	3	3

Qualifying competition
2	(Poland) Jan Sadzik	2	7	2
(Turkey) Kaan Işık Koşaner	6	5	6

==== Third qualifier ====
First round
3	(United States) Safir Azam	6	6
WC	(France) Evan Giurescu	2	2
(Ecuador) Lucas Yúnez	7	6
14	(Poland) Aleksander Błuś	5	2

Qualifying competition
3	(United States) Safir Azam	7	6
(Ecuador) Lucas Yúnez	5	3

==== Fourth qualifier ====
First round
4	(Spain) Eudald González	6	5	0
(Germany) Oliver Majdandžić	4	7	6
WC	(France) Lenny Couturier	2	4
15	(Nigeria) Oluwaseun Peter Ogunsakin	6	6

Qualifying competition
(Germany) Oliver Majdandžić	6	7^{7}
15	(Nigeria) Oluwaseun Peter Ogunsakin	3	6^{5}

==== Fifth qualifier ====
First round
5	(South Africa) John Bothma	5	5
(United States) Agassi Rusher	7	7
WC	(France) Amaury Abbas	4	1
9	(Spain) Maxi Carrascosa Díaz	6	6

Qualifying competition
(United States) Agassi Rusher	7	6
9	(Spain) Maxi Carrascosa Díaz	5	4

==== Sixth qualifier ====
First round
6	(Thailand) Kunanan Pantaratorn	3	0
(United States) Navneet Raghuram	6	6
WC	(France) Arman Dubreuil	3	6^{7}
13	(Germany) Christopher Thies	6	7^{9}

Qualifying competition
(United States) Navneet Raghuram	6^{5}	6^{3}
13	(Germany) Christopher Thies	7^{7}	7^{7}

==== Seventh qualifier ====
First round
7	(Australia) Mustafa Ege Şık	7	7^{7}
(United States) Michael Savano	5	6^{3}
(Japan) Takahiro Kawaguchi	1	6	3
16	(Canada) Felix Roussel	6	4	6

Qualifying competition
7	(Australia) Mustafa Ege Şık	7^{7}	6
16	(Canada) Felix Roussel	6^{5}	1

==== Eighth qualifier ====
First round
8	(Botswana) Ntungamili Raguin	6	6
(France) Mario Vukovic	3	2
(Kazakhstan) Daniel Tazabekov	5	0
11	Marat Salbiev	7	6

Qualifying competition
8	(Botswana) Ntungamili Raguin	4	3
11	Marat Salbiev	6	6
