= Vincent Reisach =

German tennis player (born 2009)

- Full name: Vincent Jakob Reisach
- Country (sports): Germany
- Born: 15 January 2009 (age 17)
- Prize money: US $3,178

Singles
- Career record: 0–0
- Career titles: 0
- Highest ranking: No. 1,167 (24 August 2026)
- Current ranking: No. 1,174 (26 October 2026)

Grand Slam singles results
- French Open Junior: 1R (2026)
- Wimbledon Junior: SF (2026)
- US Open Junior: 1R (2026)

Doubles
- Career record: 0–0
- Career titles: 0
- Highest ranking: No. 1,258 (19 October 2026)
- Current ranking: No. 1,262 (26 October 2026)

Grand Slam doubles results
- French Open Junior: W (2026)
- Wimbledon Junior: 1R (2026)
- US Open Junior: 1R (2026)
- Last updated on: 26 October 2026.

Vincent Reisach (born 13 March 2009) is a German tennis player. He has a career-high ATP singles ranking of No. 1,167 achieved on 24 August 2026 and a career-high doubles ranking of No. 1,258 achieved on 19 October 2026.

Reisach also a career-high ITF junior combined ranking of No. 7 achieved on 26 October 2026.

== Career ==
From Plattling, and a member of TC Weiß-Blau Landshut, Reisach was German U14 tennis champion in 2023.

In January 2026, he won his first ATP point at the age of 16 years-old, competing at the Cadolzburg Open, an ITF World Tennis Tour M15 event. with a win against compatriot Ben Ostheimer before also defeating top seed Nino Ehrenschneider.

Playing alongside compatriot Jamie Mackenzie, he won the 2026 French Open boys' doubles title on his major junior debut. In the semi-final they defeated Jack Secord and Yannik Álvarez before beating French pair Daniel Jade and Mathys Domenc in the final.

At the 2026 Wimbledon Championships, he reached the semi-finals of the boys's singles with a win over American player Jack Secord, before facing another American, Jordan Lee but losing in straight sets.

== Junior Grand Slam finals ==
=== Doubles: 1 (title) ===
Result	Year	Tournament	Surface	Partner	Opponents	Score
Win	2026	French Open	Clay	(Germany) Jamie Mackenzie	(France) Mathys Domenc (France) Daniel Jade	6–1, 6–4
