= 2026 French Open – Mixed doubles =

Tennis championship

Mixed doubles
- 2026 French Open
- Final date: 4 June 2026

Final
- Champions: (Italy) Sara Errani (Italy) Andrea Vavassori
- Runners-up: (Canada) Gabriela Dabrowski (United States) Evan King
- Score: 4–6, 6–3, [10–4]

Details
- Draw: 32
- Seeds: 8

Events
Singles	men	women		boys	girls
Doubles	men	women	mixed	boys	girls
WC Singles	men	women	quad	boys	girls
WC Doubles	men	women	quad	boys	girls
- French Open

Defending champions Sara Errani and Andrea Vavassori defeated Gabriela Dabrowski and Evan King in the final, 4–6, 6–3, [10–4] to win the mixed doubles tennis title at the 2026 French Open. It was the pair's fourth major mixed doubles title, and they were the first pair to defend the title since Latisha Chan and Ivan Dodig in 2019.

== Seeds ==
1. (Italy) Sara Errani / (Italy) Andrea Vavassori (champions)
2. (Brazil) Luisa Stefani / (El Salvador) Marcelo Arévalo (first round)
3. (China) Zhang Shuai / (Germany) Tim Pütz (withdrew)
4. (United States) Desirae Krawczyk / (United Kingdom) Neal Skupski (quarterfinals)
5. (Netherlands) Demi Schuurs / (United Kingdom) Julian Cash (first round)
6. (United Kingdom) Olivia Nicholls / (United Kingdom) Henry Patten (second round, withdrew)
7. (Kazakhstan) Anna Danilina / (United States) JJ Tracy (quarterfinals)
8. (Slovakia) Tereza Mihalíková / (Germany) Kevin Krawietz (first round)

== Draw ==
Key

- Q = Qualifier
- WC = Wild card
- LL = Lucky loser
- Alt = Alternate
- ITF = ITF entry
- PR = Protected ranking
- SR = Special ranking
- SE = Special exempt
- JE = Junior exempt
- JR = Junior Accelerator Programme entrant
- CO = College Accelerator Programme entrant
- NG = Next Gen Accelerator Program entrant
- w/o = Walkover
- r = Retired
- d = Defaulted

=== Finals ===
Semifinals
1	(Italy) Sara Errani (Italy) Andrea Vavassori	6	6
(Germany) Laura Siegemund (France) Édouard Roger-Vasselin	1	4
(Canada) Gabriela Dabrowski (United States) Evan King	7	6^{6}	[10]
(United States) Asia Muhammad (Croatia) Nikola Mektić	5	7^{8}	[5]

Final
1	(Italy) Sara Errani (Italy) Andrea Vavassori	4	6	[10]
(Canada) Gabriela Dabrowski (United States) Evan King	6	3	[4]

=== Top half ===
First round
1	(Italy) S Errani (Italy) A Vavassori	6	6
(Australia) E Perez (Portugal) F Cabral	2	2
Alt	(Chinese Taipei) H-c Chan (Brazil) O Luz	3	6^{1}
(Hungary) F Stollár (United States) C Harrison	6	7^{7}
(Norway) U Eikeri (Austria) L Miedler	7	6
WC	(France) T Rakotomanga Rajaonah (France) A Reymond	5	3
(Australia) S Hunter (Monaco) H Nys	4	5
7	(Kazakhstan) A Danilina (United States) JJ Tracy	6	7
4	(United States) D Krawczyk (United Kingdom) N Skupski	6	6
WC	(France) H Tan (France) G Jacq	2	1
A Panova (India) Y Bhambri	7^{7}	7^{7}
(Ukraine) L Kichenok (Netherlands) D Pel	6^{2}	6^{5}
WC	(France) E Cascino (France) L Sanchez	1	6^{2}
WC	(France) K Mladenovic (France) M Guinard	6	7^{7}
(Germany) L Siegemund (France) É Roger-Vasselin	6	6
5	(Netherlands) D Schuurs (United Kingdom) J Cash	2	3

Second round
1	(Italy) S Errani (Italy) A Vavassori	6	1	[10]
(Hungary) F Stollár (United States) C Harrison	4	6	[6]
(Norway) U Eikeri (Austria) L Miedler	1	6	[8]
7	(Kazakhstan) A Danilina (United States) JJ Tracy	6	4	[10]
4	(United States) D Krawczyk (United Kingdom) N Skupski	6	6
A Panova (India) Y Bhambri	1	3
WC	(France) K Mladenovic (France) M Guinard	2	4
(Germany) L Siegemund (France) É Roger-Vasselin	6	6

Quarterfinals
1	(Italy) S Errani (Italy) A Vavassori	6	6
7	(Kazakhstan) A Danilina (United States) JJ Tracy	2	2
4	(United States) D Krawczyk (United Kingdom) N Skupski	6^{5}	5
(Germany) L Siegemund (France) É Roger-Vasselin	7^{7}	7

Semifinals
1	(Italy) S Errani (Italy) A Vavassori	6	6
(Germany) L Siegemund (France) É Roger-Vasselin	1	4

=== Bottom half ===
First round
8	(Slovakia) T Mihalíková (Germany) K Krawietz	3	3
(Spain) C Bucșa (Brazil) R Matos	6	6
(Chinese Taipei) S-w Hsieh (Germany) M Wallner	6	7
PR	(Slovenia) A Klepač (United Kingdom) L Glasspool	3	5
(Canada) G Dabrowski (United States) E King	7^{7}	4	[10]
V Zvonareva (France) A Olivetti	6^{4}	6	[7]
Alt	(Mexico) G Olmos (United States) A Krajicek	6	6^{3}	[6]
Alt	I Khromacheva (Germany) J Schnaitter	2	7^{7}	[10]
6	(United Kingdom) O Nicholls (United Kingdom) H Patten	6^{4}	7^{7}	[10]
(United States) N Melichar-Martinez (France) T Arribagé	7^{7}	6^{3}	[6]
(United States) A Muhammad (Croatia) N Mektić	6	6
WC	(France) A Hesse (France) S Doumbia	1	3
WC	(France) C Burel (France) H Gaston	6^{6}	7	[5]
WC	(France) L Jeanjean (France) G Blancaneaux	7^{8}	5	[10]
(New Zealand) E Routliffe (Sweden) A Göransson	6	3	[10]
2	(Brazil) L Stefani (El Salvador) M Arévalo	3	6	[7]

Second round
(Spain) C Bucșa (Brazil) R Matos	5	6	[10]
(Chinese Taipei) S-w Hsieh (Germany) M Wallner	7	4	[6]
(Canada) G Dabrowski (United States) E King	6	6
Alt	I Khromacheva (Germany) J Schnaitter	4	4
6	(United Kingdom) O Nicholls (United Kingdom) H Patten
(United States) A Muhammad (Croatia) N Mektić	w/o
WC	(France) L Jeanjean (France) G Blancaneaux	4	2
(New Zealand) E Routliffe (Sweden) A Göransson	6	6

Quarterfinals
(Spain) C Bucșa (Brazil) R Matos
(Canada) G Dabrowski (United States) E King	w/o
(United States) A Muhammad (Croatia) N Mektić	5	6	[14]
(New Zealand) E Routliffe (Sweden) A Göransson	7	4	[12]

Semifinals
(Canada) G Dabrowski (United States) E King	7	6^{6}	[10]
(United States) A Muhammad (Croatia) N Mektić	5	7^{8}	[5]

== Other entry information ==
=== Wild cards ===
- (France) Clara Burel / (France) Hugo Gaston
- (France) Estelle Cascino / (France) Luca Sanchez
- (France) Amandine Hesse / (France) Sadio Doumbia
- ~~(France) Elsa Jacquemot / (France) Moïse Kouamé~~
- (France) Léolia Jeanjean / (France) Geoffrey Blancaneaux
- (France) Kristina Mladenovic / (France) Manuel Guinard
- (France) Tiantsoa Rakotomanga Rajaonah / (France) Arthur Reymond
- (France) Harmony Tan / (France) Gregoire Jacq

=== Protected ranking ===
- (Slovenia) Andreja Klepač / (United Kingdom) Lloyd Glasspool

=== Alternates ===
- (Chinese Taipei) Chan Hao-ching / (Brazil) Orlando Luz
- Irina Khromacheva / (Germany) Jakob Schnaitter
- (Mexico) Giuliana Olmos / (United States) Austin Krajicek

=== Withdrawals ===
- (China) Guo Hanyu / (France) Fabien Reboul → replaced by (Mexico) Giuliana Olmos / (United States) Austin Krajicek
- (France) Elsa Jacquemot / (France) Moïse Kouamé → replaced by (Chinese Taipei) Chan Hao-ching / (Brazil) Orlando Luz
- (China) Zhang Shuai / (Germany) Tim Pütz → replaced by Irina Khromacheva / (Germany) Jakob Schnaitter
