= Sun Xinran =

Chinese tennis player (born 2010)

- Native name: 孙心然
- Country (sports): China
- Residence: Belgrade, Serbia
- Born: 23 July 2010 (age 16) Shenzhen, Guangdong, China
- Plays: Right (two-handed backhand)
- Coach: Goran Krivokuća
- Prize money: $86,306

Singles
- Career record: 28–12
- Career titles: 2 ITF
- Highest ranking: No. 303 (2 November 2026)
- Current ranking: No. 303 (2 November 2026)

Grand Slam singles results
- Australian Open Junior: QF (2026)
- French Open Junior: F (2026)
- Wimbledon Junior: F (2026)
- US Open Junior: W (2026)

Doubles
- Career record: 6–3
- Career titles: 0
- Highest ranking: No. 1,185 (27 July 2026)
- Current ranking: No. 1,207 (31 August 2026)

Grand Slam doubles results
- Australian Open Junior: 1R (2026)
- French Open Junior: SF (2026)
- Wimbledon Junior: 1R (2026)
- US Open Junior: SF (2026)
- Last updated on: 12 September 2026.

Sun Xinran (Chinese: 孙心然; pinyin: Sūn Xīnrán; born 23 July 2010) is a Chinese tennis player. She has a career-high WTA singles ranking of world No. 303, achieved on 2 November 2026.

On the ITF Junior Circuit, she reached a combined ranking of world No. 1 in June 2026.

== Early life ==
Sun began playing tennis at the age of five. She plays right-handed and lists hard courts as her preferred surface.

In 2020, at the age of ten, her athletic potential led her management team and family to orchestrate a long-term athletic relocation to Belgrade. She was placed under the long-term guidance of Serbian head tennis coach Goran Krivokuća, and also trains alongside coach Goran Životić and fitness coach Aleksa Martinov.

Due to her deep integration into the local athletic community and her fluency in conversational Serbian, local media and tennis circles frequently refer to her by the moniker The Serbian Chinese Girl. Sun has cited Novak Djokovic, Li Na, and Zheng Qinwen among her tennis idols.

== Juniors ==
In March 2025, Sun won the J300 tournament in Nonthaburi, Thailand. Later that year, she won back-to-back W15 titles in Sharm El Sheikh, Egypt, on the ITF Women's World Tennis Tour. In December 2025, Sun won the girls' singles title at the J500 Fort Lauderdale tournament, also known as the Orange Bowl, defeating Kristina Liutova in the final. She became the youngest Chinese winner of a J500 tournament. In May 2026, Sun won the girls' singles title at the 2026 Trofeo Bonfiglio, becoming the first Chinese player, male or female, to win two J500 singles titles.

Sun was runner-up in the girls' singles at the 2026 French Open, losing to Alisa Oktiabreva, and at the 2026 Wimbledon Championships, where she was defeated by Anna Pushkareva. She faced Pushkareva again in the final of the 2026 US Open, where Sun won in three sets.

In October 2026, Sun won the girls' singles title at the World Tennis Tour Junior Finals in Chengdu. Entering the event as the top seed, she went undefeated throughout the tournament and defeated Pushkareva in three sets in the final. She became the second Chinese player to win the Junior Finals title, after Xu Shilin in 2015.

== Professional ==
=== 2026: WTA Tour debut and first semifinal ===
Entering as a wildcard, Sun made her WTA Tour main-draw debut at the 2026 China Open in September 2026. In the first round, she notched her first WTA Tour win when her opponent, Eva Lys, retired due to a leg injury while trailing by a set and a double break of serve. Sun then achieved her first top 50 win by defeating 27th seed Cristina Bucșa in straight sets, before losing to world No. 4 Coco Gauff in the third round.

Sun later received a wildcard to the 2026 Guangzhou Open, defeating Mananchaya Sawangkaew and seventh seed Maria Timofeeva to reach her first WTA Tour quarterfinal. With her win against Timofeeva, Sun became the youngest player to reach a WTA Tour hard-court quarterfinal since Coco Gauff in 2019. She then defeated Claire Liu in straight sets to reach her first WTA Tour semifinal, where she lost to qualifier Harriet Dart in three sets.

== ITF Circuit finals ==
=== Singles: 2 (2 titles) ===
Legend W15 tournaments (2–0)	Finals by surface Hard (2–0) Clay (–)

Result	W–L	Date	Tournament	Tier	Surface	Opponent	Score
Win	1–0	Oct 2025	ITF Sharm El Sheikh, Egypt	W15	Hard	Valeriia Artemeva	6–1, 6–0
Win	2–0	Nov 2025	ITF Sharm El Sheikh, Egypt	W15	Hard	Anna Pushkareva	6–1, 2–6, 6–2

=== Doubles: 1 (runner-up) ===
Legend W15 tournaments (0–1)	Finals by surface Hard (0–1)

Result	W–L	Date	Tournament	Tier	Surface	Partner	Opponents	Score
Loss	0–1	Oct 2025	ITF Sharm El Sheikh, Egypt	W15	Hard	(China) Xiao Lexue	(Estonia) Andrea Roots (Moldova) Eva Zabolotnaia	6–2, 1–6, [6–10]

== ITF Junior Circuit ==
=== Junior Grand Slam tournaments ===
==== Singles: 3 (1 title, 2 runner-ups) ====
Result	Year	Tournament	Surface	Opponent	Score
Loss	2026	French Open	Clay	Alisa Oktiabreva	2–6, 1–6
Loss	2026	Wimbledon	Grass	Anna Pushkareva	7–5, 3–6, 4–6
Win	2026	US Open	Hard	Anna Pushkareva	6–4, 4–6, 6–0

=== ITF Junior ===
==== Singles: 20 (11 titles, 9 runner-ups) ====
Legend J500/JGS (3–2) J300 (3–1) J200 (0–3) J100 (1–0) J60 (4–2) J30 (0–1)	Finals by surface Hard (5–4) Clay (6–4) Grass (0–1)

Result	W–L	Date	Location	Tier	Surface	Opponent	Score
Loss	0–1	Sep 2023	ITF Tirana, Albania	J60	Hard	(Serbia) Anastasija Cvetković	6–4, 5–7, 1–6
Loss	0–2	Sep 2023	ITF Tirana, Albania	J60	Hard	(Sweden) Linea Bajraliu	6–7^{(8)}, 4–6
Win	1–2	Apr 2024	ITF Doha, Qatar	J60	Hard	(Serbia) Gala Ivanović	6–2, 3–6, 6–1
Win	2–2	May 2024	ITF Ulcinj, Montenegro	J60	Clay	(Montenegro) Iva Lakić	6–2, 6–3
Loss	2–3	May 2024	ITF Podgorica, Montenegro	J60	Clay	(Serbia) Dušica Popovski	6–2, 1–6, 3–6
Win	3–3	Aug 2024	ITF Skopje, North Macedonia	J60	Clay	(Serbia) Masa Tanasković	6–1, 6–1
Win	4–3	Aug 2024	ITF Skopje, North Macedonia	J60	Clay	(Serbia) Dušica Popovski	6–2, 6–1
Loss	4–4	Oct 2024	ITF Beijing, China	J300	Hard	(China) Zhang Ruien	1–6, 5–7
Win	5–4	Oct 2024	ITF Shanghai, China	J100	Hard	(China) Qu Yihan	6–3, 6–1
Loss	5–5	Jan 2025	ITF Hammamet, Tunisia	J200	Clay	(Serbia) Anastasija Cvetković	6–7^{(2)}, 0–6
Loss	5–6	Jan 2025	ITF Tunis, Tunisia	J200	Clay	(Spain) Neus Torner Sensano	6–3, 6–7^{(5)}, 4–6
Loss	5–7	Mar 2025	ITF Nonthaburi, Thailand	J200	Hard	(China) Wang Yuhan	6–1, 3–6, 1–6
Win	6–7	Mar 2025	ITF Nonthaburi, Thailand	J300	Hard	(China) Wang Yuhan	6–3, 6–3
Win	7–7	Dec 2025	ITF Fort Lauderdale, United States	J500	Clay	Kristina Liutova	6–4, 6–1
Win	8–7	Jan 2026	ITF Traralgon, Australia	J300	Hard	(France) Ksenia Efremova	6–1, 6–3
Win	9–7	May 2026	ITF Plovdiv, Bulgaria	J300	Clay	(Serbia) Anastasija Cvetković	6–4, 6–1
Win	10–7	May 2026	ITF Milan, Italy	J500	Clay	Mariia Makarova	6–2, 7–5
Loss	10–8	Jun 2026	French Open, France	JGS	Clay	Alisa Oktiabreva	2–6, 1–6
Loss	10–9	Jul 2026	Wimbledon, United Kingdom	JGS	Grass	Anna Pushkareva	7–5, 3–6, 4–6
Win	11–9	Sep 2026	US Open, United States	JGS	Hard	Anna Pushkareva	6–4, 4–6, 6–0

==== Doubles: 5 (3 titles, 2 runner-ups) ====
Legend J300 (2–1) J100 (0–1) J60 (1–0)	Finals by surface Hard (1–2) Clay (2–0)

Result	W–L	Date	Location	Tier	Surface	Partner	Opponents	Score
Win	1–0	Aug 2024	ITF Skopje, North Macedonia	J60	Clay	(Serbia) Dušica Popovski	(Romania) Sonia Erika Butuc Cerchez (United Kingdom) Lara Savic	7–6^{(1)}, 6–2
Loss	1–1	Oct 2024	ITF Shanghai, China	J100	Hard	(China) Geng Xinle	(China) Luo Xi (China) Tang Xiao	2–6, 1–6
Loss	1–2	Aug 2025	ITF College Park, United States	J300	Hard	(China) Shao Yushan	(Thailand) Kamonwan Yodpetch (China) Zhang Ruien	5–7, 6–4, [5–10]
Win	2–2	Oct 2025	ITF Beijing, China	J300	Hard	(China) Shao Yushan	(China) Li Yuyao (China) Tang Xiao	1–6, 6–2, [10–6]
Win	3–2	Dec 2025	ITF Bradenton, United States	J300	Clay	(Japan) Kanon Sawashiro	(Serbia) Anastasija Cvetković (Argentina) Sol Ailin Larraya Guidi	6–2, 6–4
