= 2026 French Open – Wheelchair men's singles =

Tennis championship

Wheelchair men's singles
- 2026 French Open

Final
- Champion: (Japan) Tokito Oda
- Runner-up: (United Kingdom) Alfie Hewett
- Score: 6–3, 6–3
- Date: 6 June 2026

Details
- Draw: 16
- Seeds: 4

Events
Singles	men	women		boys	girls
Doubles	men	women	mixed	boys	girls
WC Singles	men	women	quad	boys	girls
WC Doubles	men	women	quad	boys	girls
- French Open

Three-time defending champion Tokito Oda defeated Alfie Hewett in the final, 6–3, 6–3 to win the men's singles wheelchair tennis title at the 2026 French Open. It was his fourth French Open singles title and ninth major singles title overall.

== Seeds ==
1. (Japan) Tokito Oda (champion)
2. (United Kingdom) Alfie Hewett (final)
3. (Spain) Martín de la Puente (semifinals)
4. (Argentina) Gustavo Fernández (semifinals)

== Draw ==
Key

- Q = Qualifier
- WC = Wild card
- LL = Lucky loser
- Alt = Alternate
- ITF = ITF entry
- PR = Protected ranking
- SR = Special ranking
- SE = Special exempt
- JE = Junior exempt
- JR = Junior Accelerator Programme entrant
- CO = College Accelerator Programme entrant
- NG = Next Gen Accelerator Program entrant
- w/o = Walkover
- r = Retired
- d = Defaulted

=== Draw ===
First round
1	(Japan) Tokito Oda	6	6
(United Kingdom) Gordon Reid	2	4
(United States) Casey Ratzlaff	6^{5}	3
(Brazil) Daniel Rodrigues	7^{7}	6
3	(Spain) Martín de la Puente	6	6
(France) Stéphane Houdet	2	3
(Japan) Takuya Miki	6	6
(Netherlands) Ruben Spaargaren	4	2
(Netherlands) Tom Egberink	6	6
(Israel) Sergei Lysov	1	2
(Spain) Daniel Caverzaschi	3	2
4	(Argentina) Gustavo Fernández	6	6
(China) Ji Zhenxu	6	6
WC	(France) Frédéric Cattaneo	0	2
WC	(France) Guilhem Laget	3	0
2	(United Kingdom) Alfie Hewett	6	6

Quarterfinals
1	(Japan) T Oda	6	6
(Brazil) D Rodrigues	1	1
3	(Spain) M de la Puente	6	2	7^{10}
(Japan) T Miki	4	6	6^{8}
(Netherlands) T Egberink	6	3	4
4	(Argentina) G Fernández	3	6	6
(China) Z Ji	1	4
2	(United Kingdom) A Hewett	6	6

Semifinals
1	(Japan) T Oda	7^{7}	6
3	(Spain) M de la Puente	6^{4}	2
4	(Argentina) G Fernández	5	4
2	(United Kingdom) A Hewett	7	6

Final
1	(Japan) T Oda	6	6
2	(United Kingdom) A Hewett	3	3
