= 2026 French Open – Wheelchair women's singles =

Tennis championship

Wheelchair women's singles
- 2026 French Open

Final
- Champion: (Netherlands) Diede de Groot
- Runner-up: (France) Ksénia Chasteau
- Score: 6–1, 6–0
- Date: 6 June 2026

Details
- Draw: 16
- Seeds: 4

Events
| Singles | men | women | | boys | girls |
| Doubles | men | women | mixed | boys | girls |
| WC Singles | men | women | quad | boys | girls |
| WC Doubles | men | women | quad | boys | girls |
- French Open

Diede de Groot defeated Ksénia Chasteau in the final, 6–1, 6–0 to win the women's singles wheelchair tennis title at the 2026 French Open. It was her sixth French Open singles title and 24th major singles title overall, and her first in nearly two years. De Groot completed the sextuple career Grand Slam with the win.

Yui Kamiji was the defending champion, but lost in the semifinals to de Groot.

== Seeds ==
1. (Japan) Yui Kamiji (semifinals)
2. (China) Li Xiaohui (semifinals)
3. (Netherlands) Aniek van Koot (first round)
4. (Netherlands) Diede de Groot (champion)

== Draw ==
Key

- Q = Qualifier
- WC = Wild card
- LL = Lucky loser
- Alt = Alternate
- ITF = ITF entry
- PR = Protected ranking
- SR = Special ranking
- SE = Special exempt
- JE = Junior exempt
- JR = Junior Accelerator Programme entrant
- CO = College Accelerator Programme entrant
- NG = Next Gen Accelerator Program entrant
- w/o = Walkover
- r = Retired
- d = Defaulted

=== Draw ===
First round
1 | (Japan) Yui Kamiji | 6 | 6
(Netherlands) Jiske Griffioen | 4 | 3
WC | (France) Pauline Déroulède | 6 | 2 | 6
(China) Zhu Zhenzhen | 4 | 6 | 3
4 | (Netherlands) Diede de Groot | 6 | 5 | 6
(Netherlands) Lizzy de Greef | 0 | 7 | 1
(Netherlands) Jinte Bos | 3 | 7^{7} | 5
(China) Guo Luoyao | 6 | 6^{5} | 7
(South Africa) Kgothatso Montjane | 6 | 6
WC | (France) Charlotte Fairbank | 4 | 4
(France) Ksénia Chasteau | 6 | 2 | 6
3 | (Netherlands) Aniek van Koot | 4 | 6 | 4
(Japan) Manami Tanaka | 3 | 2
(China) Wang Ziying | 6 | 6
(Colombia) Angélica Bernal | 3 | 4
2 | (China) Li Xiaohui | 6 | 6

Quarterfinals
1 | (Japan) Y Kamiji | 6 | 6
WC | (France) P Déroulède | 0 | 2
4 | (Netherlands) D de Groot | 6 | 6
(China) L Guo | 1 | 2
(South Africa) K Montjane | 4 | 4
(France) K Chasteau | 6 | 6
(China) Z Wang | 2 | 7^{8} | 2
2 | (China) X Li | 6 | 6^{6} | 6

Semifinals
1 | (Japan) Y Kamiji | 4 | 2
4 | (Netherlands) D de Groot | 6 | 6
(France) K Chasteau | 6 | 6
2 | (China) X Li | 3 | 1

Final
4 | (Netherlands) D de Groot | 6 | 6
(France) K Chasteau | 1 | 0
