= Alisa Oktiabreva =

Russian tennis player (born 2008)

- Country (sports): Czech Republic
- Residence: Prague, Czech Republic
- Born: 26 July 2008 (age 18) Russia
- Plays: Right-handed
- Prize money: US$ 44,571

Singles
- Career record: 78–19
- Career titles: 9 ITF
- Highest ranking: No. 280 (6 April 2026)
- Current ranking: No. 309 (25 May 2026)

Grand Slam singles results
- French Open Junior: W (2026)

Doubles
- Career record: 0–1
- Last updated on: 6 June 2026.

Alisa Oktiabreva (Czech: Alisa Okťabreva; Russian: Алиса Артуровна Октябрёва; born 26 July 2008) is a Czech professional tennis player. She has a career-high singles ranking by the WTA of 280, achieved on 6 April 2026.

== Life and career ==
Born in Russia, Oktiabreva lives and trains in the Czech Republic since the age of two. She has been training and playing for the TK Sparta Prague club since the age of four. As a 14-year-old, Oktiabreva reached the semi-final of the 2023 French Open in the girls' singles, losing to eventual winner Alina Korneeva but having beaten American second seed Clervie Ngounoue in the quarter-final.

In 2024, Oktiabreva suffered from an ankle injury which required surgery and ruled her out of action for most of the year. She returned to win her first professional title in a W15 event in Antalya, Turkey at the end of that year, followed by titles in 2025 at W35 events in Antalya and Leme. As a 16-year-old wildcard, she was a quarter-finalist at the 2025 ATV Tennis Open in July 2025. The following month, she defeated German Tessa Johanna Brockmann in the final of the W50 Leipzig Open.

A wrist injury ruled her out of competition for four months from the end of 2025, and with her ranking too low to play qualifying for the French Open in 2026, she chose to switch back to the junior ranks. Playing her first junior tournament in three years in June 2026, Oktiabreva won the final of the girls' singles at the 2026 French Open. Following wins over Ekaterina Dotsenko of Russia and Jana Kovačková of the Czech Republic, she defeated Sun Xinran in the final in straight sets.

In June 2026, Oktiabreva announced that she would represent the Czech Republic from mid-June as she obtained Czech citizenship. Ranked at world No. 403 and aged 17 years old, she was awarded a wildcard entry to make her WTA Tour main-draw debut at the 2026 Prague Open, losing to Océane Dodin in the first round.

== ITF Circuit finals ==
=== Singles: 11 (10 titles, 1 runner-up) ===
Legend W50 tournaments (2–0) W35 tournaments (7–1) W15 tournaments (1–0)	Finals by surface Hard (1–0) Clay (9–1)

Result	W–L	Date	Tournament	Tier	Surface	Opponent	Score
Win	1–0	Dec 2024	ITF Antalya, Turkey	W15	Clay	(Serbia) Natalija Senić	6–2, 1–0 ret.
Win	2–0	Feb 2025	ITF Antalya, Turkey	W35	Clay	Anastasia Gasanova	3–6, 6–3, 6–4
Win	3–0	Apr 2025	ITF Leme, Brazil	W35	Clay	(Bulgaria) Gergana Topalova	6–1, 7–5
Loss	3–1	Jun 2025	ITF Ystad, Sweden	W35	Clay	(Spain) Irene Burillo Escorihuela	3–6, 3–6
Win	4–1	Aug 2025	ITF Leipzig, Germany	W50+H	Clay	(Germany) Tessa Johanna Brockmann	6–4, 6–2
Win	5–1	Feb 2026	ITF Monastir, Tunisia	W35	Hard	(Czech Republic) Eliška Ticháčková	7–6^{(4)}, 4–1 ret.
Win	6–1	Sep 2026	ITF Santa Margherita di Pula, Italy	W35	Clay	(Italy) Marta Lombardini	6–1, 4–6, 6–3
Win	7–1	Sep 2026	ITF Santa Margherita di Pula, Italy	W35	Clay	(Czech Republic) Alena Kovačková	7–5, 6–3
Win	8–1	Oct 2026	ITF Heraklion, Greece	W50	Clay	(Turkey) İpek Öz	7–5, 6–1
Win	9–1	Oct 2026	ITF Heraklion, Greece	W35	Clay	(Belgium) Tilwith di Girolami	6–7^{(4–7)}, 6–4, 6–2
Win	10–1	Nov 2026	ITF Heraklion, Greece	W35	Clay	(Spain) Ane Mintegi del Olmo	6–3, 6–3

== Junior Grand Slam finals ==
=== Singles: 1 (title) ===
Result	Year	Tournament	Surface	Opponent	Score
Win	2026	French Open	Clay	(China) Sun Xinran	6–2, 6–1
