= Keaton Hance =

American tennis player (born 2008)

- Country (sports): United States
- Born: March 6, 2008 (age 18) Torrance, California, US
- Height: 5 ft 11 in (1.80 m)
- Plays: Right-handed (two-handed backhand)
- College: University of Texas
- Coach: Ken Hance
- Prize money: US $14,587

Singles
- Career record: 0–0 (at ATP Tour level, Grand Slam level, and in Davis Cup)
- Career titles: 0
- Highest ranking: No. 743 (November 16, 2026)
- Current ranking: No. 743 (November 16, 2026)

Grand Slam singles results
- Australian Open Junior: F (2026)
- French Open Junior: SF (2026)
- Wimbledon Junior: 3R (2025)
- US Open Junior: QF (2026)

Doubles
- Career record: 0–0 (at ATP Tour level, Grand Slam level, and in Davis Cup)
- Career titles: 0
- Highest ranking: No. 776 (June 22, 2026)
- Current ranking: No. 810 (November 16, 2026)

Grand Slam doubles results
- Australian Open Junior: QF (2026)
- French Open Junior: SF (2025, 2026)
- Wimbledon Junior: 2R (2025)
- US Open Junior: W (2025)
- Last updated on: November 16, 2026.

Keaton Hance (born March 6, 2008) is an American tennis player. He has a career-high ATP singles ranking of No. 743 achieved on November 16, 2026 and a doubles ranking of No. 776 achieved on June 22, 2026.

Hance won the boys' doubles title at the 2025 US Open, with compatriot Jack Kennedy.

== Early life ==
Hance is from Torrance, California. His parents, Courtney and Ken, own a tennis academy at the South Bay Tennis Center. His brother, Connor, and sisters, Kenadi and Kimmi, are also tennis players.

== Junior career ==
Hance has good results on the ITF junior circuit, with a 121–54 singles win-loss record as of April 2026. He was part of the American team which won the 2024 Junior Davis Cup, with Jack Kennedy and Jack Secord.

Hance played alongside Kennedy in the boys' doubles at the 2025 French Open, reaching the semi-finals. The pair went on to win the final of the boys' doubles at the 2025 US Open after they defeated Jack Secord and Yannick Alvarez in the semi-final, before playing Benjamin Willwerth and Noah Johnston in the final. Later that season, he was a runner-up at the "Yucatán Cup" – a J500-level event in Mérida, Mexico – losing to third seed Luís Guto Miguel in the final.

Hance was a runner-up in the boys' singles category at the 2026 Australian Open. He lost to seventh seed Žiga Šeško in the final.

He reached an ITF junior combined ranking of world No. 3 on June 8, 2026.

== ITF World Tennis Tour finals ==
=== Singles: 1 (title) ===
Legend ITF WTT (1–0)

Result	W–L	Date	Tournament	Tier	Surface	Opponent	Score
Win	1–0	Apr 2026	M15 Orlando, US	WTT	Clay	(United States) Cannon Kingsley	walkover

=== Doubles: 2 (1 title, 1 runner-up) ===
Legend ITF WTT (1–1)

Result	W–L	Date	Tournament	Tier	Surface	Partner	Opponents	Score
Loss	0–1	Apr 2025	M15 Vero Beach, US	WTT	Clay	(United States) Jack Kennedy	(Dominican Republic) Peter Bertran (Costa Rica) Jesse Flores	2–6, 5–7
Win	1–1	Apr 2026	M15 Orlando, US	WTT	Clay	(United States) Jordan Lee	(United States) Izyan Ahmad (United States) Tomas Laukys	6–3, 6–3

== Junior Grand Slam finals ==
=== Singles: 1 (runner-up) ===
Result	Year	Tournament	Surface	Opponent	Score
Loss	2026	Australian Open	Hard	(Slovenia) Žiga Šeško	6–4, 3–6, 4–6

=== Doubles: 1 (title) ===
Result	Year	Tournament	Surface	Partner	Opponents	Score
Win	2025	US Open	Hard	(United States) Jack Kennedy	(United States) Noah Johnston (United States) Benjamin Willwerth	6–3, 1–6, [10–8]
