= 2026 French Open – Girls' singles =

Tennis championship

Girls' singles
- 2026 French Open

Final
- Champion: Alisa Oktiabreva
- Runner-up: (China) Sun Xinran
- Score: 6–2, 6–1
- Date: 6 June 2026

Details
- Draw: 64
- Seeds: 16

Events
Singles	men	women		boys	girls
Doubles	men	women	mixed	boys	girls
WC Singles	men	women	quad	boys	girls
WC Doubles	men	women	quad	boys	girls
- French Open

Alisa Oktiabreva defeated Sun Xinran in the final, 6–2, 6–1 to win the girls' singles title at the 2026 French Open.

Lilli Tagger was the reigning champion, but chose to participate in the women's singles competition, where she lost to Wang Xinyu in the first round.

== Seeds ==
1. (France) Ksenia Efremova (first round)
2. (China) Sun Xinran (final)
3. (Brazil) Victoria Luiza Barros (semifinals)
4. (Czech Republic) Jana Kovačková (semifinals)
5. (Brazil) Nauhany Vitória Leme da Silva (third round)
6. (Serbia) Anastasija Cvetković (quarterfinals)
7. (Argentina) Sol Ailin Larraya Guidi (third round)
8. Mariia Makarova (third round)
9. (Spain) Charo Esquiva Bañuls (quarterfinals)
10. (Germany) Ida Wobker (first round)
11. (Spain) Paola Piñera Celorio (third round)
12. Alisa Oktiabreva (champion)
13. (Germany) Mariella Thamm (third round)
14. Felitsata Dorofeeva-Rybas (third round)
15. (United States) Janae Preston (second round)
16. Anna Pushkareva (second round)

Click on the seed number of a player to go to their draw section.

== Draw ==
Key

- Q = Qualifier
- WC = Wild card
- LL = Lucky loser
- Alt = Alternate
- ITF = ITF entry
- PR = Protected ranking
- SR = Special ranking
- SE = Special exempt
- JE = Junior exempt
- JR = Junior Accelerator Programme entrant
- CO = College Accelerator Programme entrant
- NG = Next Gen Accelerator Program entrant
- w/o = Walkover
- r = Retired
- d = Defaulted

=== Finals ===
Quarterfinals
Q	Ekaterina Dotsenko	3	4
12	Alisa Oktiabreva	6	6
4	(Czech Republic) Jana Kovačková	6	6
9	(Spain) Charo Esquiva Bañuls	0	2
(South Korea) Lee Ha-eum	6	1	4
3	(Brazil) Victoria Luiza Barros	2	6	6
6	(Serbia) Anastasija Cvetković	0	2
2	(China) Sun Xinran	6	6

Semifinals
12	Alisa Oktiabreva	5	6	6
4	(Czech Republic) Jana Kovačková	7	4	3
3	(Brazil) Victoria Luiza Barros	2	3
2	(China) Sun Xinran	6	6

Final
12	Alisa Oktiabreva	6	6
2	(China) Sun Xinran	2	1

=== Top half ===
==== Section 1 ====
First round
1	(France) Ksenia Efremova	3	3
Q	Ekaterina Dotsenko	6	6
Q	(United States) Sarah Ye	1	1
(Romania) Giulia Safina Popa	6	6
(Czech Republic) Sofie Hettlerová	3	0
(South Korea) Jeong Ui-su	6	6
(Ukraine) Antonina Sushkova	2	3
13	(Germany) Mariella Thamm	6	6
12	Alisa Oktiabreva	6	6
(United States) Chukwumelije Clarke	1	3
Q	(Italy) Ilary Pistola	3	1
(China) Zhang Ruien	6	6
WC	(France) Eleejah Inisan	6	6
Q	(Latvia) Marija Lauva	0	4
(Canada) Nadia Lagaev	6	2	2
7	(Argentina) Sol Ailin Larraya Guidi	3	6	6

Second round
Q	E Dotsenko	7^{7}	6
(Romania) GS Popa	6^{2}	3
(South Korea) U-s Jeong	0	5
13	(Germany) M Thamm	6	7
12	A Oktiabreva	2	6	6
(China) R Zhang	6	2	2
WC	(France) E Inisan	4	0
7	(Argentina) SA Larraya Guidi	6	6

Third round
Q	E Dotsenko	7^{8}	6
13	(Germany) M Thamm	6^{6}	4
12	A Oktiabreva	6	6
7	(Argentina) SA Larraya Guidi	1	1

Quarterfinals
Q	E Dotsenko	3	4
12	A Oktiabreva	6	6

==== Section 2 ====
First round
4	(Czech Republic) Jana Kovačková	6	6
WC	(France) Daniel Baranes	4	2
SE	(Japan) Yui Komada	2	7^{7}	7^{10}
(Serbia) Lana Virc	6	6^{4}	6^{6}
(Ukraine) Polina Skliar	7^{7}	6
Q	(China) Lin Yujun	6^{4}	0
(United States) Lani Chang	6	2	6^{3}
14	Felitsata Dorofeeva-Rybas	4	6	7^{10}
9	(Spain) Charo Esquiva Bañuls	6	6
(Australia) Renee Alame	0	1
WC	(France) Daphnée Mpetshi Perricard	6	6
Q	(United States) Carrie-Anne Hoo	1	2
(China) Shao Yushan	7	7
Anastasia Lizunova	5	5
(Germany) Sonja Zhenikhova	1	7^{7}	4
5	(Brazil) Nauhany Vitória Leme da Silva	6	6^{4}	6

Second round
4	(Czech Republic) J Kovačková	6	6
SE	(Japan) Y Komada	1	4
(Ukraine) P Skliar	2	1
14	F Dorofeeva-Rybas	6	6
9	(Spain) C Esquiva Bañuls	6	6
WC	(France) D Mpetshi Perricard	0	0
(China) Y Shao	4	6	2
5	(Brazil) NV Leme da Silva	6	4	6

Third round
4	(Czech Republic) J Kovačková	3	6	6
14	F Dorofeeva-Rybas	6	4	4
9	(Spain) C Esquiva Bañuls	2	6	6
5	(Brazil) NV Leme da Silva	6	2	4

Quarterfinals
4	(Czech Republic) J Kovačková	6	6
9	(Spain) C Esquiva Bañuls	0	2

=== Bottom half ===
==== Section 3 ====
First round
8	Mariia Makarova	6	7
(United States) Jordyn Hazelitt	1	5
(China) Qu Yihan	4	6	1
(India) Maaya Rajeshwaran Revathi	6	2	6
(Jamaica) Alyssa James	6	3	7
WC	(France) Capucine Cedillo-Vayson de Pradenne	2	6	5
(South Korea) Lee Ha-eum	3	6	6
10	(Germany) Ida Wobker	6	1	4
15	(United States) Janae Preston	4	6	6
WC	(France) Cindy Langlais	6	3	2
(Czech Republic) Denisa Žoldáková	6	6
Ekaterina Tupitsyna	1	2
(United Kingdom) Hollie Smart	4	4
(Argentina) Luna María Cinalli	6	6
(Latvia) Adelina Lachinova	3	2
3	(Brazil) Victoria Luiza Barros	6	6

Second round
8	M Makarova	7^{8}	6
(India) M Rajeshwaran Revathi	6^{6}	4
(Jamaica) A James	3	2
(South Korea) H-e Lee	6	6
15	(United States) J Preston	6	6^{5}	4
(Czech Republic) D Žoldáková	4	7^{7}	6
(Argentina) LM Cinalli	1	3
3	(Brazil) VL Barros	6	6

Third round
8	M Makarova	3	6^{8}
(South Korea) H-e Lee	6	7^{10}
(Czech Republic) D Žoldáková	3	6	3
3	(Brazil) VL Barros	6	0	6

Quarterfinals
(South Korea) H-e Lee	6	1	4
3	(Brazil) VL Barros	2	6	6

==== Section 4 ====
First round
6	(Serbia) Anastasija Cvetković	6	6
Alexandra Malova	1	1
WC	(France) Nehira Sanon	4	6	6
(Czech Republic) Tereza Heřmanová	6	0	2
Q	(Ukraine) Sofiia Bielinska	6	7^{7}
WC	(Brazil) Eduarda Gomes	3	6^{2}
(United States) Welles Newman	6^{10}	2
11	(Spain) Paola Piñera Celorio	7^{12}	6
16	Anna Pushkareva	6	6
(Sweden) Lea Nilsson	3	0
(Romania) Maia Ilinca Burcescu	6	6
(United States) Thea Frodin	1	3
WC	(France) Ninon Carpentier	6^{6}	3
(Chinese Taipei) Lin Yu-chen	7^{8}	6
Q	(Czech Republic) Kateřina Zajíčková	1	4
2	(China) Sun Xinran	6	6

Second round
6	(Serbia) A Cvetković	6	6
WC	(France) N Sanon	2	2
Q	(Ukraine) S Bielinska	4	6	0
11	(Spain) P Piñera Celorio	6	1	6
16	A Pushkareva	6	4	5
(Romania) MI Burcescu	2	6	7
(Chinese Taipei) Y-c Lin	2	3
2	(China) X Sun	6	6

Third round
6	(Serbia) A Cvetković	7	6
11	(Spain) P Piñera Celorio	5	0
(Romania) MI Burcescu	5	7^{7}	5
2	(China) X Sun	7	6^{5}	7

Quarterfinals
6	(Serbia) A Cvetković	0	2
2	(China) X Sun	6	6

== Qualifying ==
=== Seeds ===
1. (China) Lin Yujun (qualified)
2. (Romania) Maria Valentina Pop (qualifying competition)
3. Polina Berezina (first round)
4. (Germany) Emily Eigelsbach (qualifying competition)
5. (Ukraine) Sofiia Bielinska (qualified)
6. (Czech Republic) Veronika Sekerková (first round)
7. (Sweden) Iva Marinković (first round)
8. (China) Wei Zhangqian (first round)
9. (United States) Olivia Traynor (qualifying competition)
10. (Czech Republic) Kateřina Zajíčková (qualified)
11. Alena Kharchenko (first round)
12. (South Korea) Sim Si-yeon (first round)
13. (Brazil) Pietra Rivoli (first round)
14. (Argentina) Sofía Meabe (first round)
15. (United States) Nancy Lee (first round)
16. (Netherlands) Fleur De Bresser (qualifying competition)

=== Qualifiers ===
1. (China) Lin Yujun
2. (United States) Sarah Ye
3. (Latvia) Marija Lauva
4. (Czech Republic) Kateřina Zajíčková
5. (Ukraine) Sofiia Bielinska
6. (United States) Carrie-Ann Hoo
7. (Italy) Ilary Pistola
8. Ekaterina Dotsenko

=== Draw ===
==== First qualifier ====
First round
1	(China) Lin Yujun	6	6
Alisa Terentyeva	2	4
WC	(France) Liv Boulard	6	7^{7}
14	(Argentina) Sofía Meabe	4	6^{5}

Qualifying competition
1	(China) Lin Yujun	7^{7}	4	6
WC	(France) Liv Boulard	6^{2}	6	3

==== Second qualifier ====
First round
2	(Romania) Maria Valentina Pop	6	6
(Japan) Riyo Yoshida	3	1
(United States) Sarah Ye	7	6
11	Alena Kharchenko	5	4

Qualifying competition
2	(Romania) Maria Valentina Pop	6	3	5
(United States) Sarah Ye	4	6	7

==== Third qualifier ====
First round
3	Polina Berezina	4	4
WC	(France) Laura Valentine Pop	6	6
(Latvia) Marija Lauva	6	6
12	(South Korea) Sim Si-yeon	0	1

Qualifying competition
WC	(France) Laura Valentine Pop	3	5
(Latvia) Marija Lauva	6	7

==== Fourth qualifier ====
First round
4	(Germany) Emily Eigelsbach	6	6
(United States) Margaret Sohns	3	3
WC	(France) Anna Brunet-Brady	7	6^{3}	3
10	(Czech Republic) Kateřina Zajíčková	5	7^{7}	6

Qualifying competition
4	(Germany) Emily Eigelsbach	6	4	5
10	(Czech Republic) Kateřina Zajíčková	2	6	7

==== Fifth qualifier ====
First round
5	(Ukraine) Sofiia Bielinska	6	6
(South Africa) Jahnie van Zyl	4	2
WC	(France) Mila Bastianelli	6	3	3
9	(United States) Olivia Traynor	3	6	6

Qualifying competition
5	(Ukraine) Sofiia Bielinska	6	2	6
9	(United States) Olivia Traynor	4	6	0

==== Sixth qualifier ====
First round
6	(Czech Republic) Veronika Sekerková	5	6	5
(United States) Carrie-Ann Hoo	7	4	7
WC	(France) Emma Wiesenfeld	2	3
16	(Netherlands) Fleur De Bresser	6	6

Qualifying competition
(United States) Carrie-Ann Hoo	6	6
16	(Netherlands) Fleur De Bresser	4	4

==== Seventh qualifier ====
First round
7	(Sweden) Iva Markinović	6	3	4
WC	(France) Hajar Crinebouch	1	6	6
(Italy) Ilary Pistola	3	7^{7}	6
15	(United States) Nancy Lee	6	6^{4}	3

Qualifying competition
WC	(France) Hajar Crinebouch	3	1
(Italy) Ilary Pistola	6	6

==== Eighth qualifier ====
First round
8	(China) Wei Zhangqian	5	2
Ekaterina Dotsenko	7	6
(United Kingdom) Daniella Britton	6	6
13	(Brazil) Pietra Rivoli	2	4

Qualifying competition
Ekaterina Dotsenko	6^{3}	6	6
(United Kingdom) Daniella Britton	7^{7}	4	3
