= Jack Kennedy (tennis) =

American tennis player (born 2008)

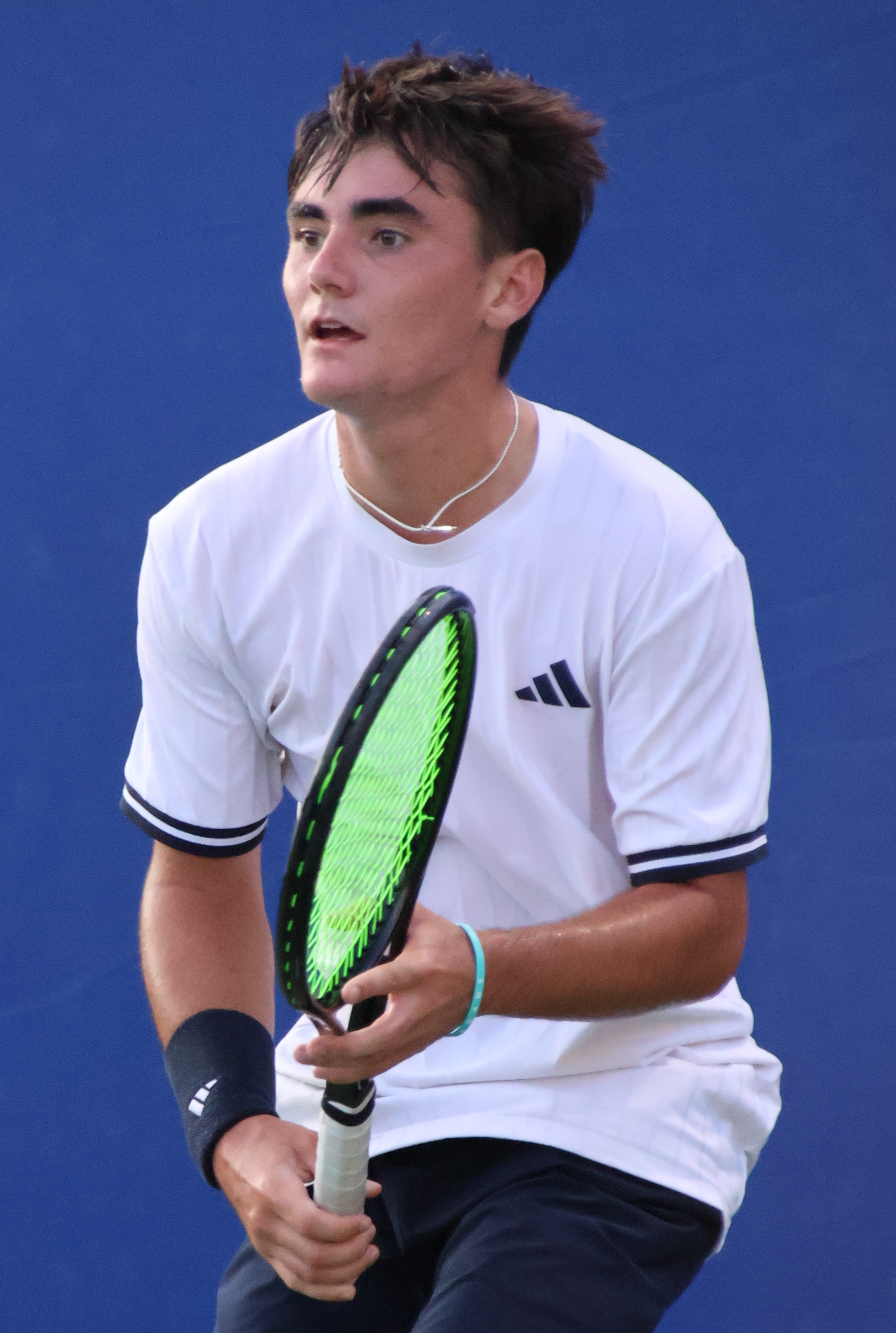
- Kennedy at the 2026 Cary Tennis Classic
- Country (sports): United States
- Born: June 4, 2008 (age 18) Huntington, New York, US
- Height: 5 ft 7 in (1.70 m)
- Plays: Right-handed (two-handed backhand)
- College: Virginia
- Coach: Greg Lumpkin
- Prize money: US $230,637

Singles
- Career record: 0–0 (at ATP Tour level, Grand Slam level, and in Davis Cup)
- Career titles: 0
- Highest ranking: No. 379 (July 27, 2026)
- Current ranking: No. 388 (September 21, 2026)

Grand Slam singles results
- US Open: 1R (2026)
- Australian Open Junior: QF (2025)
- French Open Junior: QF (2026)
- Wimbledon Junior: 3R (2025)
- US Open Junior: QF (2026)

Doubles
- Career record: 0–0 (at ATP Tour level, Grand Slam level, and in Davis Cup)
- Career titles: 0
- Highest ranking: No. 914 (September 21, 2026)
- Current ranking: No. 914 (September 21, 2026)

Grand Slam doubles results
- Australian Open Junior: 1R (2025)
- French Open Junior: SF (2025, 2026)
- Wimbledon Junior: 2R (2025)
- US Open Junior: W (2025)
- Last updated on: September 21, 2026.

Jack Kennedy (born June 4, 2008) is an American tennis player. He has a career-high ATP singles ranking of No. 379 achieved on July 27, 2026 and a doubles ranking of No. 914 achieved on September 21, 2026.

Kennedy won the boys' doubles title at the 2025 US Open, with compatriot Keaton Hance.

== Early life ==
Kennedy was born in Huntington, New York, to Bryan and Jeannie Kennedy. He trains at Robbie Wagner Tennis in Glen Cove, New York.

== Junior tennis ==
Kennedy has good results on the ITF junior circuit, with a 128–39 singles win-loss record as of April 2026. In July 2022, he won both the singles and doubles titles at the USTA Boys' 14 National Clay Court Championships. That December, he reached the final of the U14 Junior Orange Bowl. In August 2024, he reached the final of the USTA Boys' 18 National Championships, but lost to compatriot Matthew Forbes.

In January 2025, Kennedy reached the boys' singles quarterfinals of the Australian Open. That May, he won the J300 event in Santa Croce sull'Arno and reached the semifinals of the J500 Trofeo Bonfiglio. At the French Open, he and Keaton Hance reached the boys' doubles semifinals. The pair later went on to win the boys' doubles title at the US Open after defeating Jack Secord and Yannick Álvarez in the semifinals and Benjamin Willwerth and Noah Johnston in the final.

He reached an ITF junior combined ranking of world No. 3 on January 5, 2026.

== College ==
Kennedy will begin playing collegiate tennis for the Virginia Cavaliers in the fall of 2026. Due to his rapidly advancing professional career Kennedy made the decision to skip the fall season of his freshman year at the University of Virginia to continue playing pro events.

== Professional career ==
In August 2024, Kennedy received a wildcard into the qualifying competition of the US Open, but lost in the first round to Maximilian Marterer.

=== 2026: First pro title, ATP Challenger final, top 500,Grand slam debut ===
In April 2026, Kennedy won his first professional title, a Futures-level event at M15 Boca Raton, United States. He defeated seventh seed Andreja Petrovic in the final. The same month, he competed at Tallahassee Tennis Challenger, reaching the semifinals before losing to João Lucas Reis da Silva.

The following week, Kennedy reached his first Challenger final in Savannah, Georgia, with a notable win over former Top 10 Kei Nishikori in the second round. He lost to second seed Nishesh Basavareddy in the final.

At the US Open 2026 Kennedy was given a wildcard into the main draw of the tournament to play his first ever grand slam. He lost in the first round to South African Lloyd Harris in straight sets.

== Performance timelines ==
Key
W	F	SF	QF	#R	RR	Q#	DNQ	A	NH

(W) winner; (F) finalist; (SF) semifinalist; (QF) quarterfinalist; (#R) rounds 4, 3, 2, 1; (RR) round-robin stage; (Q#) qualification round; (DNQ) did not qualify; (A) absent; (NH) not held; (SR) strike rate (events won / competed); (W–L) win–loss record.
To avoid confusion and double counting, these charts are updated at the conclusion of a tournament or when the player's participation has ended.

=== Singles ===
Current through the 2026 US Open.

Tournament	2024	2025	2026	SR	W–L	Win%
Australian Open	A	A	A	0 / 0	0–0	–
French Open	A	A	A	0 / 0	0–0	–
Wimbledon	A	A	A	0 / 0	0–0	–
US Open	Q1	Q1	1R	0 / 1	0–1	0%
Win–loss	0–0	0–0	0–1	0 / 1	0–1	0%

== ATP Challenger and ITF World Tennis Tour finals ==
=== Singles: 2 (1 title, 1 runner-up) ===
Legend ATP Challenger Tour (0–1) ITF WTT (1–0)

Result	W–L	Date	Tournament	Tier	Surface	Opponent	Score
Loss	0–1	Apr 2026	Savannah Challenger, US	Challenger	Clay	(United States) Nishesh Basavareddy	3–6, 0–6

Result	W–L	Date	Tournament	Tier	Surface	Opponent	Score
Win	1–0	Apr 2026	M15 Boca Raton, US	WTT	Clay	(Norway) Andreja Petrovic	6–3, 6–4

=== Doubles: 1 (runner-up) ===
Legend ATP Challenger Tour (–) ITF WTT (0–1)

Result	W–L	Date	Tournament	Tier	Surface	Partner	Opponents	Score
Loss	0–1	Apr 2025	M15 Vero Beach, US	WTT	Clay	(United States) Keaton Hance	(Dominican Republic) Peter Bertran (Costa Rica) Jesse Flores	2–6, 5–7

== Junior Grand Slam finals ==
=== Doubles: 1 (title) ===
Result	Year	Tournament	Surface	Partner	Opponents	Score
Win	2025	US Open	Hard	(United States) Keaton Hance	(United States) Noah Johnston (United States) Benjamin Willwerth	6–3, 1–6, [10–8]
