= 2025 Australian Open – Day-by-day summaries =

The 2025 Australian Open described in detail, in the form of day-by-day summaries.

All dates are AEDT (UTC+11)

== Day 1 (12 January) ==
Due to heavy rain and thunderstorms, play was ceased between 12:00 and 18:00 on outdoor courts. This cessation resulted in several matches being postponed. Play continued on the three main areas, under a closed roof.

- Seeds out:
  - Women's singles: (Czech Republic) Linda Nosková [29]
- Schedule of Play

Matches on Main Courts
Matches on Rod Laver Arena
Event	Winner	Loser	Score
Women's singles 1st Round	(China) Zheng Qinwen [5]	(Romania) Anca Todoni [Q]	7–6^{(7–3)}, 6–1
Men's singles 1st Round	(Norway) Casper Ruud [6]	(Spain) Jaume Munar	6–3, 1–6, 7–5, 2–6, 6–1
Women's singles 1st Round	Aryna Sabalenka [1]	(United States) Sloane Stephens	6–3, 6–2
Men's singles 1st Round	(Germany) Alexander Zverev [2]	(France) Lucas Pouille [WC]	6–4, 6–4, 6–4
Matches on Margaret Court Arena
Event	Winner	Loser	Score
Men's singles 1st Round	(France) Arthur Fils [20]	(Finland) Otto Virtanen	3–6, 7–6^{(7–4)}, 6–4, 6–4
Women's singles 1st Round	(Croatia) Donna Vekić [18]	(France) Diane Parry	6–4, 6–4
Men's singles 1st Round	(Czech Republic) Jiří Lehečka [24]	(Australia) Li Tu [WC]	6–1, 3–6, 6–3, 7–6^{(7–1)}
Women's singles 1st Round	Anna Blinkova	(Australia) Daria Saville [WC]	1–6, 6–4, 7–5
Matches on John Cain Arena
Event	Winner	Loser	Score
Women's singles 1st Round	Mirra Andreeva [14]	(Czech Republic) Marie Bouzková	6–3, 6–3
Men's singles 1st Round	(Japan) Kei Nishikori [PR]	(Brazil) Thiago Monteiro [Q]	4–6, 6–7^{(4–7)}, 7–5, 6–2, 6–3
Women's singles 1st Round	(Spain) Paula Badosa [11]	(China) Wang Xinyu	6–3, 7–6^{(7–5)}
Men's singles 1st Round	(France) Ugo Humbert [14]	(Italy) Matteo Gigante [Q]	7–6^{(7–5)}, 7–5, 6–4
Matches on Kia Arena
Event	Winner	Loser	Score
Women's singles 1st Round	(Canada) Leylah Fernandez [30]	(Ukraine) Yuliia Starodubtseva	7–5, 6–4
Men's singles 1st Round	(United States) Reilly Opelka [PR]	(Belgium) Gauthier Onclin [Q]	3–6, 7–6^{(7–4)}, 6–3, 6–2
Men's singles 1st Round	(Bosnia and Herzegovina) Damir Džumhur vs. (Australia) Aleksandar Vukic		Postponed
Women's singles 1st Round	(Japan) Nao Hibino [Q] vs. (Ukraine) Marta Kostyuk [17]		Postponed
Matches on 1573 Arena
Event	Winner	Loser	Score
Women's singles 1st Round	(Germany) Tatjana Maria	(United States) Bernarda Pera	7–6^{(7–3)}, 6–4
Men's singles 1st Round	(Czech Republic) Tomáš Macháč [26]	(India) Sumit Nagal	6–3, 6–1, 7–5
Coloured background indicates a night match
Day matches began at 11 am (11:30 am on Rod Laver Arena and Margaret Court Arena), whilst Night matches began at 7 pm (5 pm on John Cain Arena) AEDT

== Day 2 (13 January) ==
- Seeds out:
  - Men's singles: (Bulgaria) Grigor Dimitrov [10], (Greece) Stefanos Tsitsipas [11], (Chile) Alejandro Tabilo [23], (Argentina) Sebastián Báez [28]
  - Women's singles: (Latvia) Jeļena Ostapenko [16], Victoria Azarenka [21]
- Schedule of Play

Matches on Main Courts
Matches on Rod Laver Arena
Event	Winner	Loser	Score
Women's singles 1st Round	(United States) Coco Gauff [3]	(United States) Sofia Kenin	6–3, 6–3
Men's singles 1st Round	(Italy) Jannik Sinner [1]	(Chile) Nicolás Jarry	7–6^{(7–2)}, 7–6^{(7–5)}, 6–1
Men's singles 1st Round	(Serbia) Novak Djokovic [7]	(United States) Nishesh Basavareddy [WC]	4–6, 6–3, 6–4, 6–2
Women's singles 1st Round	(Japan) Naomi Osaka	(France) Caroline Garcia	6–3, 3–6, 6–3
Matches on Margaret Court Arena
Event	Winner	Loser	Score
Women's singles 1st Round	(Australia) Ajla Tomljanović [WC]	(United States) Ashlyn Krueger	6–4, 4–6, 6–4
Men's singles 1st Round	(Australia) Jordan Thompson [27]	(Germany) Dominik Koepfer [Q]	7–6^{(7–3)}, 6–4, 4–6, 6–3
Men's singles 1st Round	(Spain) Carlos Alcaraz [3]	(Kazakhstan) Alexander Shevchenko	6–1, 7–5, 6–1
Women's singles 1st Round	(United States) Danielle Collins [10]	(Ukraine) Daria Snigur [Q]	7–6^{(7–4)}, 6–3
Matches on John Cain Arena
Event	Winner	Loser	Score
Men's singles 1st Round	(United States) Alex Michelsen	(Greece) Stefanos Tsitsipas [11]	7–5, 6–3, 2–6, 6–4
Women's singles 1st Round	(Poland) Iga Świątek [2]	(Czech Republic) Kateřina Siniaková	6–3, 6–4
Women's singles 1st Round	(United States) Jessica Pegula [7]	(Australia) Maya Joint [WC]	6–3, 6–0
Men's singles 1st Round	(United Kingdom) Jacob Fearnley	(Australia) Nick Kyrgios [PR]	7–6^{(7–3)}, 6–3, 7–6^{(7–2)}
Matches on Kia Arena
Event	Winner	Loser	Score
Women's singles 1st Round	Diana Shnaider [12]	(Italy) Elisabetta Cocciaretto	7–6^{(7–4)}, 6–4
Women's singles 1st Round	(Italy) Lucia Bronzetti	Victoria Azarenka [21]	6–2, 7–6^{(7–2)}
Men's singles 1st Round	(Australia) Thanasi Kokkinakis	Roman Safiullin	3–6, 6–3, 6–3, 7–6^{(7–5)}
Men's singles 1st Round	(United States) Tommy Paul [12]	(Australia) Christopher O'Connell	2–6, 6–3, 6–1, 6–7^{(5–7)}, 7–5
Matches on 1573 Arena
Event	Winner	Loser	Score
Men's singles 1st Round	(United States) Frances Tiafoe [17]	(France) Arthur Rinderknech	7–6^{(7–2)}, 6–3, 4–6, 6–7^{(4–7)}, 6–3
Women's singles 1st Round	(Switzerland) Belinda Bencic [PR]	(Latvia) Jeļena Ostapenko [16]	6–3, 7–6^{(8–6)}
Women's singles 1st Round (Note: This match was originally scheduled to be played on Kia Arena on January 12 but was postponed to January 13 due to a long rain delay and rescheduled to 1573 Arena in place of the originally scheduled Kalinina-Jabeur match, rescheduled to January 14.)	(Ukraine) Marta Kostyuk [17]	(Japan) Nao Hibino [Q]	3–6, 6–3, 6–1
Men's singles 1st Round	(Italy) Francesco Passaro [LL]	(Bulgaria) Grigor Dimitrov [10]	7–5, 2–1 retired
Coloured background indicates a night match
Day matches began at 11 am (11:30 am on Rod Laver Arena and Margaret Court Arena), whilst Night matches began at 7 pm (5 pm on John Cain Arena) AEDT

== Day 3 (14 January) ==
- Seeds out:
  - Men's singles: Andrey Rublev [9], (Australia) Alexei Popyrin [25], (France) Giovanni Mpetshi Perricard [30], (Italy) Flavio Cobolli [32]
  - Women's singles: Ekaterina Alexandrova [26], (Greece) Maria Sakkari [31]
  - Men's doubles: (Colombia) Nicolás Barrientos / (India) Rohan Bopanna [14]
- Schedule of Play

Matches on Main Courts
Matches on Rod Laver Arena
Event	Winner	Loser	Score
Women's singles 1st Round	(United States) Emma Navarro [8]	(United States) Peyton Stearns	6–7^{(5–7)}, 7–6^{(7–5)}, 7–5
Men's singles 1st Round	Daniil Medvedev [5]	(Thailand) Kasidit Samrej [WC]	6–2, 4–6, 3–6, 6–1, 6–2
Men's singles 1st Round	(Australia) Alex de Minaur [8]	(Netherlands) Botic van de Zandschulp	6–1, 7–5, 6–4
Women's singles 1st Round	Veronika Kudermetova	(Australia) Olivia Gadecki	6–1, 6–1
Matches on Margaret Court Arena
Event	Winner	Loser	Score
Men's singles 1st Round	(Denmark) Holger Rune [13]	(China) Zhang Zhizhen	4–6, 6–3, 6–4, 3–6, 6–4
Women's singles 1st Round	(Kazakhstan) Elena Rybakina [6]	(Australia) Emerson Jones [WC]	6–1, 6–1
Women's singles 1st Round	(Italy) Jasmine Paolini [4]	(China) Wei Sijia [Q]	6–0, 6–4
Men's singles 1st Round	(Brazil) João Fonseca [Q]	Andrey Rublev [9]	7–6^{(7–1)}, 6–3, 7–6^{(7–5)}
Matches on John Cain Arena
Event	Winner	Loser	Score
Women's singles 1st Round	Daria Kasatkina [9]	(Bulgaria) Viktoriya Tomova	6–1, 6–3
Men's singles 1st Round	(United States) Taylor Fritz [4]	(United States) Jenson Brooksby [PR]	6–2, 6–0, 6–3
Women's singles 1st Round	(United States) Madison Keys [19]	(United States) Ann Li	6–4, 7–5
Men's singles 1st Round	(France) Corentin Moutet	(Australia) Alexei Popyrin [25]	4–6, 6–3, 6–4, 6–4
Matches on Kia Arena
Event	Winner	Loser	Score
Men's singles 1st Round	(Italy) Matteo Berrettini	(United Kingdom) Cameron Norrie	6–7^{(4–7)}, 6–4, 6–1, 6–3
Women's singles 1st Round	(Germany) Eva Lys [LL]	(Australia) Kimberly Birrell [Q]	6–2, 6–2
Men's singles 1st Round	(Italy) Lorenzo Musetti [16]	(Italy) Matteo Arnaldi	7–6^{(7–4)}, 4–6, 7–6^{(7–5)}, 6–3
Women's singles 1st Round	(United Kingdom) Katie Boulter [22]	(Canada) Rebecca Marino	6–4, 3–6, 7–5
Matches on 1573 Arena
Event	Winner	Loser	Score
Women's singles 1st Round	(Brazil) Beatriz Haddad Maia [15]	(Argentina) Julia Riera [Q]	4–6, 7–5, 6–2
Men's singles 1st Round	(Poland) Hubert Hurkacz [18]	(Netherlands) Tallon Griekspoor	7–5, 6–4, 6–4
Men's singles 1st Round	(United States) Ben Shelton [21]	(United States) Brandon Nakashima	7–6^{(7–3)}, 7–5, 7–5
Women's singles 1st Round	(Tunisia) Ons Jabeur	(Ukraine) Anhelina Kalinina	6–3, 6–3
Coloured background indicates a night match
Day matches began at 11 am (11:30 am on Rod Laver Arena and Margaret Court Arena), whilst Night matches began at 7 pm (5 pm on John Cain Arena) AEDT

== Day 4 (15 January) ==
- Seeds out:
  - Men's singles: (Norway) Casper Ruud [6], (United States) Sebastian Korda [22], (Australia) Jordan Thompson [27], (Canada) Félix Auger-Aliassime [29]
  - Women's singles: (China) Zheng Qinwen [5], (Czech Republic) Karolína Muchová [20], Liudmila Samsonova [25]
  - Women's doubles: (Kazakhstan) Anna Danilina / Irina Khromacheva [8]
- Schedule of Play

Matches on Main Courts
Matches on Rod Laver Arena
Event	Winner	Loser	Score
Women's singles 2nd Round	Aryna Sabalenka [1]	(Spain) Jéssica Bouzas Maneiro	6–3, 7–5
Men's singles 2nd Round	(Serbia) Novak Djokovic [7]	(Portugal) Jaime Faria [Q]	6–1, 6–7^{(4–7)}, 6–3, 6–2
Women's singles 2nd Round	(United States) Coco Gauff [3]	(United Kingdom) Jodie Burrage [PR]	6–3, 7–5
Men's singles 2nd Round	(Germany) Alexander Zverev [2]	(Spain) Pedro Martínez	6–1, 6–4, 6–1
Matches on Margaret Court Arena
Event	Winner	Loser	Score
Women's singles 2nd Round	(United States) Jessica Pegula [7]	(Belgium) Elise Mertens	6–4, 6–2
Men's singles 2nd Round	(Spain) Carlos Alcaraz [3]	(Japan) Yoshihito Nishioka	6–0, 6–1, 6–4
Men's doubles 1st Round	(Australia) Marc Polmans [WC] (Australia) Matthew Romios [WC]	(France) Arthur Rinderknech (France) Manuel Guinard	7–6^{(7–2)}, 3–6, 6–3
Men's singles 2nd Round	(Czech Republic) Jakub Menšík	(Norway) Casper Ruud [6]	6–2, 3–6, 6–1, 6–4
Women's singles 2nd Round	(Spain) Paula Badosa [11]	(Australia) Talia Gibson [WC]	6–1, 6–0
Matches on John Cain Arena
Event	Winner	Loser	Score
Women's singles 2nd Round	(Germany) Laura Siegemund	(China) Zheng Qinwen [5]	7–6^{(7–3)}, 6–3
Men's singles 2nd Round	(Portugal) Nuno Borges	(Australia) Jordan Thompson [27]	6–3, 6–2, 6–4
Women's singles 2nd Round	Diana Shnaider [12]	(Australia) Ajla Tomljanović [WC]	6–4, 7–5
Men's singles 2nd Round	(United Kingdom) Jack Draper [15]	(Australia) Thanasi Kokkinakis	6–7^{(3–7)}, 6–3, 3–6, 7–5, 6–3
Matches on Kia Arena
Event	Winner	Loser	Score
Women's singles 2nd Round	(Serbia) Olga Danilović	Liudmila Samsonova [25]	6–1, 6–2
Women's singles 2nd Round	(Japan) Naomi Osaka	(Czech Republic) Karolína Muchová [20]	1–6, 6–1, 6–3
Men's singles 2nd Round	(Australia) Aleksandar Vukic	(United States) Sebastian Korda [22]	6–4, 3–6, 2–6, 6–3, 7–5
Matches on 1573 Arena
Event	Winner	Loser	Score
Men's singles 2nd Round	(Czech Republic) Tomáš Macháč [26]	(United States) Reilly Opelka [PR]	3–6, 7–6^{(7–1)}, 6–7^{(5–7)}, 7–6^{(7–4)}, 6–4
Women's singles 2nd Round	Anastasia Pavlyuchenkova [27]	Anastasia Potapova	7–6^{(7–2)}, 2–6, 6–2
Men's singles 2nd Round	(United States) Tommy Paul [12]	(Japan) Kei Nishikori [PR]	6–7^{(3–7)}, 6–0, 6–3, 6–1
Coloured background indicates a night match
Day matches began at 11 am (11:30 am on Rod Laver Arena and Margaret Court Arena), whilst Night matches began at 7 pm (5 pm on John Cain Arena) AEDT

== Day 5 (16 January) ==
- Seeds out:
  - Men's singles: Daniil Medvedev [5], (United States) Frances Tiafoe [17], (Poland) Hubert Hurkacz [18]
  - Women's singles: (United Kingdom) Katie Boulter [22]
  - Men's doubles: (Croatia) Nikola Mektić / (New Zealand) Michael Venus [5], (Argentina) Máximo González / (Argentina) Andrés Molteni [8]
  - Women's doubles: (Czech Republic) Marie Bouzková / (United States) Bethanie Mattek-Sands [14]
- Schedule of Play

Matches on Main Courts
Matches on Rod Laver Arena
Event	Winner	Loser	Score
Women's singles 2nd Round	(Poland) Iga Świątek [2]	(Slovakia) Rebecca Šramková	6–0, 6–2
Men's singles 2nd Round	(Australia) Alex de Minaur [8]	(United States) Tristan Boyer [Q]	6–2, 6–4, 6–3
Men's singles 2nd Round	(Italy) Jannik Sinner [1]	(Australia) Tristan Schoolkate [WC]	4–6, 6–4, 6–1, 6–3
Women's singles 2nd Round	(Italy) Jasmine Paolini [4]	(Mexico) Renata Zarazúa	6–2, 6–3
Matches on Margaret Court Arena
Event	Winner	Loser	Score
Women's singles 2nd Round	(United States) Emma Navarro [8]	(China) Wang Xiyu	6–3, 3–6, 6–4
Men's singles 2nd Round	(United States) Taylor Fritz [4]	(Chile) Cristian Garín [Q]	6–2, 6–1, 6–0
Women's singles 2nd Round	(United States) Madison Keys [19]	(Romania) Elena-Gabriela Ruse [Q]	7–6^{(7–1)}, 2–6, 7–5
Men's singles 2nd Round	(United States) Learner Tien [Q]	Daniil Medvedev [5]	6–3, 7–6^{(7–4)}, 6–7^{(8–10)} 1–6, 7–6^{(10–7)}
Matches on John Cain Arena
Event	Winner	Loser	Score
Men's singles 2nd Round	(Serbia) Miomir Kecmanović	(Poland) Hubert Hurkacz [18]	6–4, 6–4, 6–2
Women's singles 2nd Round	(Kazakhstan) Elena Rybakina [6]	(United States) Iva Jovic [WC]	6–0, 6–3
Men's singles 2nd Round	(Denmark) Holger Rune [13]	(Italy) Matteo Berrettini	7–6^{(7–3)}, 2–6, 6–3, 7–6^{(8–6)}
Men's doubles 1st Round	(Australia) James Duckworth (Australia) Aleksandar Vukic	(Australia) Thanasi Kokkinakis [PR] (Australia) Nick Kyrgios [PR]	7–5, 3–2 retired
Matches on Kia Arena
Event	Winner	Loser	Score
Women's singles 2nd Round	(United Kingdom) Emma Raducanu	(United States) Amanda Anisimova	6–3, 7–5
Men's singles 2nd Round	(United States) Ben Shelton [21]	(Spain) Pablo Carreño Busta [PR]	6–3, 6–3, 6–7^{(4–7)}, 6–4
Men's singles 2nd Round	(Hungary) Fábián Marozsán	(United States) Frances Tiafoe [17]	6–7^{(3–7)}, 6–4, 3–6, 6–4, 6–1
Women's singles 2nd Round	(United States) Danielle Collins [10]	(Australia) Destanee Aiava [Q]	7–6^{(7–4)}, 4–6, 6–2
Matches on 1573 Arena
Event	Winner	Loser	Score
Women's singles 2nd Round	Daria Kasatkina [9]	(China) Wang Yafan	6–2, 6–0
Men's singles 2nd Round	(France) Gaël Monfils	(Germany) Daniel Altmaier	7–5, 6–3, 7–6^{(7–3)}
Women's singles 2nd Round	(Brazil) Beatriz Haddad Maia [15]	Erika Andreeva	6–2, 6–3
Men's singles 2nd Round	(Italy) Lorenzo Sonego	(Brazil) João Fonseca [Q]	6–7^{(6–8)}, 6–3, 6–1, 3–6, 6–3
Coloured background indicates a night match
Day matches began at 11 am (11:30 am on Rod Laver Arena and Margaret Court Arena), whilst Night matches began at 7 pm (5 pm on John Cain Arena) AEDT

== Day 6 (17 January) ==
- Seeds out:
  - Men's singles: (France) Arthur Fils [20], (Czech Republic) Tomáš Macháč [26]
  - Women's singles: (United States) Jessica Pegula [7], Diana Shnaider [12], (Ukraine) Marta Kostyuk [17], (Poland) Magdalena Fręch [23], (Canada) Leylah Fernandez [30]
  - Men's doubles: (Australia) Matthew Ebden / (Belgium) Joran Vliegen [9], (United Kingdom) Jamie Murray / (Australia) John Peers [12]
  - Women's doubles: (United States) Sofia Kenin / (Romania) Monica Niculescu [10]
  - Mixed doubles: (United States) Desirae Krawczyk / (United Kingdom) Neal Skupski [5]
- Schedule of Play

Matches on Main Courts
Matches on Rod Laver Arena
Event	Winner	Loser	Score
Women's singles 3rd Round	Aryna Sabalenka [1]	(Denmark) Clara Tauson	7–6^{(7–5)}, 6–4
Men's singles 3rd Round	(Spain) Carlos Alcaraz [3]	(Portugal) Nuno Borges	6–2, 6–4, 6–7^{(3–7)}, 6–2
Men's singles 3rd Round	(Serbia) Novak Djokovic [7]	(Czech Republic) Tomáš Macháč [26]	6–1, 6–4, 6–4
Women's singles 3rd Round	(Serbia) Olga Danilović	(United States) Jessica Pegula [7]	7–6^{(7–3)}, 6–1
Matches on Margaret Court Arena
Event	Winner	Loser	Score
Women's singles 3rd Round	(Croatia) Donna Vekić [18]	Diana Shnaider [12]	7–6^{(7–4)}, 6–7^{(3–7)}, 7–5
Men's singles 3rd Round	(Germany) Alexander Zverev [2]	(United Kingdom) Jacob Fearnley	6–3, 6–4, 6–4
Women's singles 3rd Round	(United States) Coco Gauff [3]	(Canada) Leylah Fernandez [30]	6–4, 6–2
Men's singles 3rd Round	(United Kingdom) Jack Draper [15]	(Australia) Aleksandar Vukic	6–4, 2–6, 5–7, 7–6^{(7–5)}, 7–6^{(10–8)}
Matches on John Cain Arena
Event	Winner	Loser	Score
Women's singles 3rd Round	Anastasia Pavlyuchenkova [27]	(Germany) Laura Siegemund	6–1, 6–2
Men's singles 3rd Round	(United States) Tommy Paul [12]	(Spain) Roberto Carballés Baena	7–6^{(7–0)}, 6–2, 6–0
Women's singles 3rd Round	(Switzerland) Belinda Bencic [PR]	(Japan) Naomi Osaka	7–6^{(7–3)} retired
Men's singles 3rd Round	(France) Ugo Humbert [14]	(France) Arthur Fils [20]	4–6, 7–5, 6–4, 1–0 retired
Matches on Kia Arena
Event	Winner	Loser	Score
Men's doubles 1st Round	(United States) Austin Krajicek (United States) Rajeev Ram	(Australia) Matthew Ebden [9] (Belgium) Joran Vliegen [9]	6–1, 6–4
Women's singles 3rd Round	(Spain) Paula Badosa [11]	(Ukraine) Marta Kostyuk [17]	6–4, 4–6, 6–3
Men's singles 3rd Round	(Spain) Alejandro Davidovich Fokina	(Czech Republic) Jakub Menšík	3–6, 4–6, 7–6^{(9–7)}, 6–4, 6–2
Men's singles 3rd Round	(Czech Republic) Jiří Lehečka [24]	(France) Benjamin Bonzi	6–2, 6–3, 6–3
Matches on 1573 Arena
Event	Winner	Loser	Score
Women's doubles 2nd Round	(Czech Republic) Kateřina Siniaková [1] (United States) Taylor Townsend [1]	(Japan) Shuko Aoyama (Japan) Eri Hozumi	7–6^{(7–4)}, 6–2
Men's doubles 2nd Round	(Netherlands) Tallon Griekspoor (Netherlands) Botic van de Zandschulp	(United Kingdom) Jamie Murray [12] (Australia) John Peers [12]	7–5, 6–2
Women's singles 3rd Round	Mirra Andreeva [14]	(Poland) Magdalena Fręch [23]	6–2, 1–6, 6–2
Women's doubles 1st Round	(Ukraine) Marta Kostyuk (Romania) Elena-Gabriela Ruse	(Australia) Destanee Aiava [WC] (Australia) Maddison Inglis [WC]	6–4, 7–6^{(7–2)}
Mixed doubles 1st Round	Irina Khromacheva (United States) Jackson Withrow	(Australia) Daria Saville [WC] (Australia) Luke Saville [WC]	6–4, 6–0
Coloured background indicates a night match
Day matches began at 11 am (11:30 am on Rod Laver Arena and Margaret Court Arena), whilst Night matches began at 7 pm (5 pm on John Cain Arena) AEDT

== Day 7 (18 January) ==
- Seeds out:
  - Men's singles: (United States) Taylor Fritz [4], (Italy) Lorenzo Musetti [16], Karen Khachanov [19], (Argentina) Francisco Cerúndolo [31]
  - Women's singles: (Italy) Jasmine Paolini [4], (United States) Danielle Collins [10], (Brazil) Beatriz Haddad Maia [15], (Kazakhstan) Yulia Putintseva [24], (Ukraine) Dayana Yastremska [32]
  - Men's doubles: (United States) Nathaniel Lammons / (United States) Jackson Withrow [7], (United Kingdom) Joe Salisbury / (United Kingdom) Neal Skupski [10]
  - Women's doubles: (Belgium) Elise Mertens / (Australia) Ellen Perez [6]
- Schedule of Play

Matches on Main Courts
Matches on Rod Laver Arena
Event	Winner	Loser	Score
Women's singles 3rd Round	(Poland) Iga Świątek [2]	(United Kingdom) Emma Raducanu	6–1, 6–0
Men's singles 3rd Round	(Australia) Alex de Minaur [8]	(Argentina) Francisco Cerúndolo [31]	5–7, 7–6^{(7–3)}, 6–3, 6–3
Men's singles 3rd Round	(Italy) Jannik Sinner [1]	(United States) Marcos Giron	6–3, 6–4, 6–2
Women's singles 3rd Round	(United States) Madison Keys [19]	(United States) Danielle Collins [10]	6–4, 6–4
Matches on Margaret Court Arena
Event	Winner	Loser	Score
Women's singles 3rd Round	(United States) Emma Navarro [8]	(Tunisia) Ons Jabeur	6–4, 3–6, 6–4
Men's singles 3rd Round	(France) Gaël Monfils	(United States) Taylor Fritz [4]	3–6, 7–5, 7–6^{(7–1)}, 6–4
Women's singles 3rd Round	(Ukraine) Elina Svitolina [28]	(Italy) Jasmine Paolini [4]	2–6, 6–4, 6–0
Men's singles 3rd Round	(Denmark) Holger Rune [13]	(Serbia) Miomir Kecmanović	6–7^{(5–7)}, 6–3, 4–6, 6–4, 6–4
Matches on John Cain Arena
Event	Winner	Loser	Score
Men's singles 3rd Round	(United States) Alex Michelsen	Karen Khachanov [19]	6–3, 7–6^{(7–5)}, 6–2
Women's singles 3rd Round	(Kazakhstan) Elena Rybakina [6]	(Ukraine) Dayana Yastremska [32]	6–3, 6–4
Men's singles 3rd Round	(United States) Ben Shelton [21]	(Italy) Lorenzo Musetti [16]	6–3, 3–6, 6–4, 7–6^{(7–5)}
Matches on Kia Arena
Event	Winner	Loser	Score
Men's doubles 2nd Round	(United States) Austin Krajicek (United States) Rajeev Ram	(Australia) Tristan Schoolkate [WC] (Australia) Adam Walton [WC]	6–2, 6–4
Women's singles 3rd Round	Daria Kasatkina [9]	(Kazakhstan) Yulia Putintseva [24]	7–5, 6–1
Men's singles 3rd Round	(United States) Learner Tien [Q]	(France) Corentin Moutet	7–6^{(12–10)}, 6–3, 6–3
Mixed doubles 1st Round	(United States) Taylor Townsend [4] (Monaco) Hugo Nys [4]	(Australia) Maddison Inglis [WC] (Australia) Jason Kubler [WC]	6–1, 7–5
Mixed doubles 1st Round	(New Zealand) Erin Routliffe [2] (New Zealand) Michael Venus [2]	(Latvia) Jeļena Ostapenko (United Kingdom) Joe Salisbury	3–6, 6–3, [10–1]
Matches on 1573 Arena
Event	Winner	Loser	Score
Men's doubles 2nd Round	(Monaco) Hugo Nys [15] (France) Édouard Roger-Vasselin [15]	(Croatia) Ivan Dodig (Tunisia) Skander Mansouri	6–7^{(4–7)}, 6–3, 7–5
Women's doubles 2nd Round	(Ukraine) Marta Kostyuk (Romania) Elena-Gabriela Ruse	(Belgium) Elise Mertens [6] (Australia) Ellen Perez [6]	6–4, 6–4
Women's singles 3rd Round	Veronika Kudermetova	(Brazil) Beatriz Haddad Maia [15]	6–4, 6–2
Men's doubles 2nd Round	(Australia) Luke Saville [WC] (Australia) Li Tu [WC]	(Australia) James Duckworth (Australia) Aleksandar Vukic	6–1, 7–5
Men's doubles 2nd Round	(Czech Republic) Tomáš Macháč (China) Zhang Zhizhen	(Germany) Jakob Schnaitter (Germany) Mark Wallner	5–7, 6–4, 6–4
Coloured background indicates a night match
Day matches began at 11 am (11:30 am on Rod Laver Arena and Margaret Court Arena), whilst Night matches began at 7 pm AEDT

== Day 8 (19 January) ==
- Seeds out:
  - Men's singles: (France) Ugo Humbert [14], (United Kingdom) Jack Draper [15], (Czech Republic) Jiří Lehečka [24]
  - Women's singles: Mirra Andreeva [14], (Croatia) Donna Vekić [18]
  - Men's doubles: (France) Sadio Doumbia / (France) Fabien Reboul [16]
  - Women's doubles: (Italy) Sara Errani / (Italy) Jasmine Paolini [4], (United States) Asia Muhammad / (Netherlands) Demi Schuurs [7], Veronika Kudermetova / (Japan) Ena Shibahara [11], (China) Guo Hanyu / Alexandra Panova [12], (Hungary) Tímea Babos / (United States) Nicole Melichar-Martinez [13]
  - Mixed Doubles: (Italy) Sara Errani / (Italy) Andrea Vavassori [1], (United States) Taylor Townsend / (Monaco) Hugo Nys [4], (Netherlands) Demi Schuurs / (Germany) Tim Pütz [7]
- Schedule of Play

Matches on Main Courts
Matches on Rod Laver Arena
Event	Winner	Loser	Score
Women's singles 4th Round	Aryna Sabalenka [1]	Mirra Andreeva [14]	6–1, 6–2
Women's singles 4th Round	(United States) Coco Gauff [3]	(Switzerland) Belinda Bencic [PR]	5–7, 6–2, 6–1
Men's singles 4th Round	(Spain) Carlos Alcaraz [3]	(United Kingdom) Jack Draper [15]	7–5, 6–1, retired
Men's singles 4th Round	(Serbia) Novak Djokovic [7]	(Czech Republic) Jiří Lehečka [24]	6–3, 6–4, 7–6^{(7–4)}
Men's doubles 3rd Round	(Sweden) André Göransson (Netherlands) Sem Verbeek	(Australia) Luke Saville [WC] (Australia) Li Tu [WC]	6–4, 6–3
Matches on Margaret Court Arena
Event	Winner	Loser	Score
Men's doubles 3rd Round	(Italy) Simone Bolelli [3] (Italy) Andrea Vavassori [3]	(Spain) Pedro Martínez (Spain) Jaume Munar	6–3, 7–6^{(8–6)}
Women's singles 4th Round	(Spain) Paula Badosa [11]	(Serbia) Olga Danilović	6–1, 7–6^{(7–2)}
Men's singles 4th Round	(United States) Tommy Paul [12]	(Spain) Alejandro Davidovich Fokina	6–1, 6–1, 6–1
Mixed doubles 2nd Round	(Australia) Kimberly Birrell [WC] (Australia) John-Patrick Smith [WC]	(Netherlands) Demi Schuurs [7] (Germany) Tim Pütz [7]	6–3, 5–7, [10–8]
Matches on John Cain Arena
Event	Winner	Loser	Score
Men's doubles 3rd Round	(Portugal) Nuno Borges (Portugal) Francisco Cabral	(Netherlands) Tallon Griekspoor (Netherlands) Botic van de Zandschulp	7–6^{(7–5)}, 3–6, 6–3
Women's singles 4th Round	Anastasia Pavlyuchenkova [27]	(Croatia) Donna Vekić [18]	7–6^{(7–0)}, 6–0
Women's doubles 2nd Round	Mirra Andreeva; Diana Shnaider	(Italy) Sara Errani [4] (Italy) Jasmine Paolini [4]	7–5, 7–5
Men's singles 4th Round	(Germany) Alexander Zverev [2]	(France) Ugo Humbert [14]	6–1, 2–6, 6–3, 6–2
Matches on Kia Arena
Event	Winner	Loser	Score
Women's doubles 3rd Round	(Ukraine) Marta Kostyuk (Romania) Elena-Gabriela Ruse	(China) Guo Hanyu [12] Alexandra Panova [12]	7–5, 4–6, 7–6^{(10–6)}
Women's doubles 2nd Round	(China) Wang Xinyu (China) Zheng Saisai	Veronika Kudermetova [11] (Japan) Ena Shibahara [11]	6–1, 7–5
Mixed doubles 2nd Round	(China) Zhang Shuai (India) Rohan Bopanna	(United States) Taylor Townsend [4] (Monaco) Hugo Nys [4]	Walkover
Mixed doubles 2nd Round	(United States) Asia Muhammad [8] (Argentina) Andrés Molteni [8]	(Kazakhstan) Anna Danilina (Finland) Harri Heliövaara	6–1, 4–6, [11–9]
Men's doubles 3rd Round	(El Salvador) Marcelo Arévalo [1] (Croatia) Mate Pavić [1]	(France) Sadio Doumbia [16] (France) Fabien Reboul [16]	6–4, 7–6^{(7–5)}
Matches on 1573 Arena
Event	Winner	Loser	Score
Girls' singles 1st Round	(Australia) Tahlia Kokkinis [WC]	(Bulgaria) Rositsa Dencheva [10]	6–3, 6–2
Women's doubles 2nd Round	(Brazil) Beatriz Haddad Maia [15] (Germany) Laura Siegemund [15]	(Italy) Lucia Bronzetti (Ukraine) Anhelina Kalinina	6–0, 7–6^{(7–5)}
Women's doubles 3rd Round	(Chinese Taipei) Hsieh Su-wei [3] (Latvia) Jeļena Ostapenko [3]	(Hungary) Tímea Babos [13] (United States) Nicole Melichar-Martinez [13]	6–4, 6–3
Mixed doubles 2nd Round	(United Kingdom) Olivia Nicholls (United Kingdom) Henry Patten	(Italy) Sara Errani [1] (Italy) Andrea Vavassori [1]	6–3, 6–4
Coloured background indicates a night match
Day matches began at 11 am (11:30 am on Rod Laver Arena and Margaret Court Arena), whilst Night matches began at 7 pm AEDT

== Day 9 (20 January) ==
- Seeds out:
  - Men's singles: (Denmark) Holger Rune [13]
  - Women's singles: (Kazakhstan) Elena Rybakina [6], Daria Kasatkina [9]
  - Men's doubles: (Belgium) Sander Gillé / (Poland) Jan Zieliński [13]
  - Women's doubles: (Chinese Taipei) Chan Hao-ching / (Ukraine) Lyudmyla Kichenok [5], (Brazil) Beatriz Haddad Maia / (Germany) Laura Siegemund [15], (Canada) Leylah Fernandez / (Ukraine) Nadiia Kichenok [16]
  - Mixed Doubles: (Chinese Taipei) Hsieh Su-wei / (Poland) Jan Zieliński [6]
- Schedule of Play

Matches on Main Courts
Matches on Rod Laver Arena
Event	Winner	Loser	Score
Women's singles 4th Round	(Ukraine) Elina Svitolina [28]	Veronika Kudermetova	6–4, 6–1
Men's singles 4th Round	(Italy) Jannik Sinner [1]	(Denmark) Holger Rune [13]	6–3, 3–6, 6–3, 6–2
Women's singles 4th Round	(Poland) Iga Świątek [2]	(Germany) Eva Lys [LL]	6–0, 6–1
Men's singles 4th Round	(Australia) Alex de Minaur [8]	(United States) Alex Michelsen	6–0, 7–6^{(7–5)}, 6–3
Matches on Margaret Court Arena
Event	Winner	Loser	Score
Women's doubles 3rd Round	(Canada) Gabriela Dabrowski [2] (New Zealand) Erin Routliffe [2]	(Brazil) Beatriz Haddad Maia [15] (Germany) Laura Siegemund [15]	6–7^{(5–7)}, 6–3, 6–4
Women's singles 4th Round	(United States) Madison Keys [19]	(Kazakhstan) Elena Rybakina [6]	6–3, 1–6, 6–3
Men's singles 4th Round	(United States) Ben Shelton [21]	(France) Gaël Monfils	7–6^{(7–3)}, 6–7^{(3–7)}, 7–6^{(7–2)}, 1–0 retired
Mixed doubles 2nd Round	(Australia) Olivia Gadecki [WC] (Australia) John Peers [WC]	(Hungary) Tímea Babos (El Salvador) Marcelo Arévalo	6–4, 6–4
Matches on John Cain Arena
Event	Winner	Loser	Score
Men's doubles 3rd Round	(Monaco) Hugo Nys [15] (France) Édouard Roger-Vasselin [15]	(Czech Republic) Tomáš Macháč (China) Zhang Zhizhen	6–3, 3–6, 6–3
Women's doubles 3rd Round	(France) Kristina Mladenovic [9] (China) Zhang Shuai [9]	(Chinese Taipei) Chan Hao-ching [5] (Ukraine) Lyudmyla Kichenok [5]	7–6^{(7–3)}, 6–2
Men's singles 4th Round	(Italy) Lorenzo Sonego	(United States) Learner Tien [Q]	6–3, 6–2, 3–6, 6–1
Women's singles 4th Round	(United States) Emma Navarro [8]	Daria Kasatkina [9]	6–4, 5–7, 7–5
Matches on Kia Arena
Event	Winner	Loser	Score
Women's doubles 3rd Round	(Czech Republic) Kateřina Siniaková [1] (United States) Taylor Townsend [1]	(Canada) Leylah Fernandez [16] (Ukraine) Nadiia Kichenok [16]	6–3, 6–0
Men's doubles 3rd Round	(United Kingdom) Julian Cash [11] (United Kingdom) Lloyd Glasspool [11]	(Uruguay) Ariel Behar (United States) Robert Galloway	6–3, 3–6, 7–6^{(11–9)}
Women's doubles 3rd Round	Mirra Andreeva; Diana Shnaider	(Australia) Kimberly Birrell [WC] (Australia) Olivia Gadecki [WC]	6–3, 6–2
Mixed doubles 2nd Round	(New Zealand) Erin Routliffe [2] (New Zealand) Michael Venus [2]	Alexandra Panova (United Kingdom) Lloyd Glasspool	Walkover
Women's doubles 3rd Round	Kamilla Rakhimova (Spain) Sara Sorribes Tormo	(China) Wang Xinyu (China) Zheng Saisai	3–6, 6–3, 7–6^{(10–8)}
Matches on 1573 Arena
Event	Winner	Loser	Score
Girls' singles 2nd Round	(Czech Republic) Alena Kovačková [12]	(Australia) Renee Alame	6–4, 6–4
Men's doubles 3rd Round	(Germany) Kevin Krawietz [4] (Germany) Tim Pütz [4]	(Belgium) Sander Gillé [13] (Poland) Jan Zieliński [13]	6–7^{(4–7)}, 6–4, 6–4
Men's doubles 3rd Round	(Finland) Harri Heliövaara [6] (United Kingdom) Henry Patten [6]	(United States) Austin Krajicek (United States) Rajeev Ram	6–3, 7–6^{(8–6)}
Mixed doubles 2nd Round	Irina Khromacheva (United States) Jackson Withrow	(Chinese Taipei) Hsieh Su-wei [6] (Poland) Jan Zieliński [6]	6–4, 6–4
Mixed doubles 2nd Round	(Australia) Ellen Perez [3] (Germany) Kevin Krawietz [3]	(Australia) Priscilla Hon [WC] (Australia) Alex Bolt [WC]	7–5, 6–4
Coloured background indicates a night match
Day matches began at 11 am (11:30 am on Rod Laver Arena and Margaret Court Arena), whilst Night matches began at 7 pm AEDT

== Day 10 (21 January) ==
- Seeds out:
  - Men's singles: (Spain) Carlos Alcaraz [3], (United States) Tommy Paul [12]
  - Women's singles: (United States) Coco Gauff [3], Anastasia Pavlyuchenkova [27]
  - Men's doubles: (El Salvador) Marcelo Arévalo / (Croatia) Mate Pavić [1]
  - Mixed Doubles: (Australia) Ellen Perez / (Germany) Kevin Krawietz [3], (United States) Asia Muhammad / (Argentina) Andrés Molteni [8]
- Schedule of Play

Matches on Main Courts
Matches on Rod Laver Arena
Event	Winner	Loser	Score
Women's singles Quarterfinals	(Spain) Paula Badosa [11]	(United States) Coco Gauff [3]	7–5, 6–4
Men's singles Quarterfinals	(Germany) Alexander Zverev [2]	(United States) Tommy Paul [12]	7–6^{(7–1)}, 7–6^{(7–0)}, 2–6, 6–1
Women's singles Quarterfinals	Aryna Sabalenka [1]	Anastasia Pavlyuchenkova [27]	6–2, 2–6, 6–3
Men's singles Quarterfinals	(Serbia) Novak Djokovic [7]	(Spain) Carlos Alcaraz [3]	4–6, 6–4, 6–3, 6–4
Matches on Margaret Court Arena
Event	Winner	Loser	Score
Women's doubles Quarterfinals	(Canada) Gabriela Dabrowski [2] (New Zealand) Erin Routliffe [2]	(Japan) Miyu Kato (Mexico) Renata Zarazúa	6–3, 6–2
Women's doubles Quarterfinals	(Chinese Taipei) Hsieh Su-wei [3] (Latvia) Jeļena Ostapenko [3]	(Ukraine) Marta Kostyuk (Romania) Elena-Gabriela Ruse	6–2, 5–7, 7–5
Women's Legends' doubles 1st Round	(Australia) Casey Dellacqua (Australia) Samantha Stosur	(Slovakia) Daniela Hantuchová (Germany) Andrea Petkovic	6–4, 6–3
Mixed doubles Quarterfinals	(New Zealand) Erin Routliffe [2] (New Zealand) Michael Venus [2]	(United States) Asia Muhammad [8] (Argentina) Andrés Molteni [8]	6–7^{(2–7)}, 6–1, [10–5]
Mixed doubles Quarterfinals	(Australia) Kimberly Birrell [WC] (Australia) John-Patrick Smith [WC]	(Australia) Ellen Perez [3] (Germany) Kevin Krawietz [3]	6–2, 3–6, [10–6]
Matches on Kia Arena
Event	Winner	Loser	Score
Men's Legends' doubles 1st Round	(Australia) Lleyton Hewitt (Australia) Pat Rafter	(United States) James Blake (Germany) Tommy Haas	6–3, 3–6, [10–8]
Men's doubles Quarterfinals	(Italy) Simone Bolelli [3] (Italy) Andrea Vavassori [3]	(Portugal) Nuno Borges (Portugal) Francisco Cabral	6–4, 7–6^{(7–4)}
Men's doubles Quarterfinals	(Sweden) André Göransson (Netherlands) Sem Verbeek	(El Salvador) Marcelo Arévalo [1] (Croatia) Mate Pavić [1]	6–4, 4–6, 6–3
Mixed doubles Quarterfinals	(United Kingdom) Olivia Nicholls (United Kingdom) Henry Patten	Irina Khromacheva (United States) Jackson Withrow	6–2, 6–2
Mixed doubles Quarterfinals	(Australia) Olivia Gadecki (Australia) John Peers	(China) Zhang Shuai (India) Rohan Bopanna	2–6, 6–4, [11–9]
Matches on 1573 Arena
Event	Winner	Loser	Score
Girls' singles 2nd Round	(United Kingdom) Hannah Klugman [14]	(Romania) Maia Ilinca Burcescu	6–3, 5–7, 6–2
Girls' singles 2nd Round	(Japan) Wakana Sonobe [4]	(Turkey) Deniz Dilek	6–2, 6–2
Boys' singles 2nd Round	(United States) Jagger Leach [5]	(Italy) Gabriele Crivellaro [Q]	6–4, 6–4
Boys' singles 2nd Round	(Switzerland) Flynn Thomas [11]	(Romania) Yannick Theodor Alexandrescou	4–6, 6–4, 6–2
Girls' doubles 2nd Round	(Japan) Wakana Sonobe (United Kingdom) Mika Stojsavljevic [1]	(United States) Maya Iyengar; Yuliya Perapekhina	6–2, 6–2
Coloured background indicates a night match
Day matches began at 11 am (11:30 am on Rod Laver Arena), whilst Night matches began at 7 pm AEDT

== Day 11 (22 January) ==
- Seeds out:
  - Men's singles: (Australia) Alex de Minaur [8]
  - Women's singles: (United States) Emma Navarro [8], (Ukraine) Elina Svitolina [28]
  - Men's doubles: (United Kingdom) Julian Cash / (United Kingdom) Lloyd Glasspool [11], (Monaco) Hugo Nys / (France) Édouard Roger-Vasselin [15]
  - Women's doubles: (France) Kristina Mladenovic / (China) Zhang Shuai [9]
  - Mixed Doubles: (New Zealand) Erin Routliffe / (New Zealand) Michael Venus [2]
- Schedule of Play

Matches on Main Courts
Matches on Rod Laver Arena
Event	Winner	Loser	Score
Women's singles Quarterfinals	(United States) Madison Keys [19]	(Ukraine) Elina Svitolina [28]	3–6, 6–3, 6–4
Women's singles Quarterfinals	(Poland) Iga Świątek [2]	(United States) Emma Navarro [8]	6–1, 6–2
Men's singles Quarterfinals	(United States) Ben Shelton [21]	(Italy) Lorenzo Sonego	6–4, 7–5, 4–6, 7–6^{(7–4)}
Men's singles Quarterfinals	(Italy) Jannik Sinner [1]	(Australia) Alex de Minaur [8]	6–3, 6–2, 6–1
Men's Legends' doubles 1st Round	(Australia) Lleyton Hewitt (Australia) Mark Philippoussis	(Cyprus) Marcos Baghdatis (United States) James Blake	6–3, 7–5
Matches on Margaret Court Arena
Event	Winner	Loser	Score
Women's doubles Quarterfinals	Mirra Andreeva; Diana Shnaider	Kamilla Rakhimova (Spain) Sara Sorribes Tormo	6–3, 6–0
Men's doubles Quarterfinals	(Finland) Harri Heliövaara [6] (United Kingdom) Henry Patten [6]	(Monaco) Hugo Nys [15] (France) Édouard Roger-Vasselin [15]	6–3, 7–5
Men's doubles Quarterfinals	(Germany) Kevin Krawietz [4] (Germany) Tim Pütz [4]	(United Kingdom) Julian Cash [11] (United Kingdom) Lloyd Glasspool [11]	7–6^{(11–9)}, 7–6^{(7–5)}
Mixed doubles Semifinals	(Australia) Olivia Gadecki [WC] (Australia) John Peers [WC]	(New Zealand) Erin Routliffe [2] (New Zealand) Michael Venus [2]	6–4, 6–4
Mixed doubles Semifinals	(Australia) Kimberly Birrell [WC] (Australia) John-Patrick Smith [WC]	(United Kingdom) Olivia Nicholls (United Kingdom) Henry Patten	7–6^{(7–4)}, 6–2
Matches on Kia Arena
Event	Winner	Loser	Score
Wheelchair Quad singles Quarterfinals	(Turkey) Ahmet Kaplan [4]	(Australia) Jin Woodman [WC]	6–2, 6–4
Women's doubles Quarterfinals	(Czech Republic) Kateřina Siniaková [1] (United States) Taylor Townsend [1]	(France) Kristina Mladenovic [9] (China) Zhang Shuai [9]	6–1, 7–5
Wheelchair Quad doubles Quarterfinals	(Australia) Heath Davidson (Canada) Robert Shaw	(Chile) Diego Pérez (United States) David Wagner	6–0, 6–2
Wheelchair Men's doubles Quarterfinals	(Spain) Daniel Caverzaschi (France) Stéphane Houdet	(Argentina) Gustavo Fernández (Belgium) Joachim Gérard	6–4, 7–5
Wheelchair Women's doubles Quarterfinals	(Japan) Yui Kamiji [2] (United Kingdom) Lucy Shuker [2]	(Chile) Macarena Cabrillana (Japan) Saki Takamuro	6–1, 6–0
Matches on 1573 Arena
Event	Winner	Loser	Score
Girls' singles 3rd Round	(Austria) Lilli Tagger	(United Kingdom) Mingge Xu [9]	6–3, 6–4
Boys' singles 3rd Round	(Sweden) William Rejchtman Vinciguerra [14]	(Kazakhstan) Amir Omarkhanov [2]	4–6, 6–4, 7–6^{(10–6)}
Girls' singles 3rd Round	(Belgium) Jeline Vandromme [3]	(United Kingdom) Hannah Klugman [14]	4–6, 6–3, 6–2
Boys' doubles Quarterfinals	(Serbia) Ognjen Milić; Egor Pleshivtsev	(Brazil) Luis Guto Miguel (Germany) Tom Sickenberger	2–6, 7–6^{(7–2)}, [10–2]
Boys' doubles Quarterfinals	(United Kingdom) Oliver Bonding [1] (United States) Jagger Leach [1]	(Germany) Jamie Mackenzie (Germany) Niels McDonald	6–0, 6–7^{(5–7)}, [10–6]
Coloured background indicates a night match
Day matches began at 11 am (11:30 am on Rod Laver Arena), whilst Night matches began at 7:30 pm AEDT

== Day 12 (23 January) ==
- Seeds out:
  - Women's singles: (Poland) Iga Świątek [2], (Spain) Paula Badosa [11]
  - Men's doubles: (Germany) Kevin Krawietz / (Germany) Tim Pütz [4]
- Schedule of Play

Matches on Main Courts
Matches on Rod Laver Arena
Event	Winner	Loser	Score
Men's doubles Semifinals	(Italy) Simone Bolelli [3] (Italy) Andrea Vavassori [3]	(Sweden) André Göransson (Netherlands) Sem Verbeek	2–6, 6–3, 6–4
Men's Legends' doubles 1st Round	(Cyprus) Marcos Baghdatis (Germany) Tommy Haas	(Australia) Mark Philippoussis (Australia) Pat Rafter	7–5, 6–4
Men's doubles Semifinals	(Finland) Harri Heliövaara [6] (United Kingdom) Henry Patten [6]	(Germany) Kevin Krawietz [4] (Germany) Tim Pütz [4]	2–6, 6–3, 7–6^{(10–7)}
Women's singles Semifinals	Aryna Sabalenka [1]	(Spain) Paula Badosa [11]	6–4, 6–2
Women's singles Semifinals	(United States) Madison Keys [19]	(Poland) Iga Świątek [2]	5–7, 6–1, 7–6^{(10–8)}
Matches on Margaret Court Arena
Event	Winner	Loser	Score
Wheelchair women's singles Semifinals	(Netherlands) Aniek van Koot [2]	(China) Wang Ziying [3]	1–6, 7–6^{(7–4)}, 6–1
Women's Legends' doubles 1st Round	(Australia) Casey Dellacqua (Australia) Alicia Molik	(Slovakia) Daniela Hantuchová (Croatia) Iva Majoli	4–6, 7–5, [10–6]
Girls' singles Semifinals	(Japan) Wakana Sonobe [4]	(Australia) Tahlia Kokkinis [WC]	6–2, 6–4
Boys' doubles Semifinals	(United States) Maxwell Exsted [2] (Sweden) Jan Kumstát [2]	(Italy) Andrea de Marchi [7] (Sweden) William Rejchtman Vinciguerra [7]	6–3, 6–7^{(2–7)}, [10–8]
Girls' doubles Semifinals	(United States) Annika Penickova [6] (United States) Kristina Penickova [6]	(Czech Republic) Alena Kovačková [5] (Czech Republic) Jana Kovačková [5]	5–7, 6–1, [11–9]
Girls' doubles Semifinals	(Australia) Emerson Jones [2] (United Kingdom) Hannah Klugman [2]	(Czech Republic) Tereza Krejčová [4] (Czech Republic) Vendula Valdmannová [4]	7–6^{(7–3)}, 6–3
Matches on Kia Arena
Event	Winner	Loser	Score
Wheelchair men's singles Semifinals	(Japan) Tokito Oda [1]	(Spain) Martín de la Puente [3]	6–1, 6–1
Wheelchair women's singles Semifinals	(Japan) Yui Kamiji [1]	(China) Li Xiaohui	6–4, 6–1
Quad doubles Quarterfinals	(Israel) Guy Sasson [1] (Netherlands) Niels Vink [1]	(Australia) Finn Broadbent (Australia) Jin Woodman	6–0, 6–1
Quad doubles Quarterfinals	(United Kingdom) Andy Lapthorne [2] (Netherlands) Sam Schröder [2]	(Australia) Heath Davidson (Canada) Robert Shaw	6–1, 6–2
Matches on 1573 Arena
Event	Winner	Loser	Score
Boys' singles Quarterfinals	(United States) Benjamin Willwerth	Timofei Derepasko [9]	6–4, 6–4
Girls' singles Quarterfinals	(Australia) Emerson Jones	(Austria) Lilli Tagger	4–6, 6–2, 6–2
Coloured background indicates a night match
Day matches began at 11 am (11:30 am on Rod Laver Arena), whilst Night matches began at 7:30 pm AEDT

== Day 13 (24 January) ==
- Seeds out:
  - Men's singles: (Serbia) Novak Djokovic [7], (United States) Ben Shelton [21]
  - Women's doubles: (Canada) Gabriela Dabrowski / (New Zealand) Erin Routliffe [2]
- Schedule of Play

Matches on Main Courts
Matches on Rod Laver Arena
Event	Winner	Loser	Score
Mixed doubles Final	(Australia) Olivia Gadecki [WC] (Australia) John Peers [WC]	(Australia) Kimberly Birrell [WC] (Australia) John-Patrick Smith [WC]	3–6, 6–4, [10–6]
Men's singles Semifinals	(Germany) Alexander Zverev [2]	(Serbia) Novak Djokovic [7]	7–6^{(7–5)}, retired
Mixed Legends' doubles 1st round	(Australia) Casey Dellacqua (Australia) Patrick Rafter	(Slovakia) Daniela Hantuchová (Germany) Tommy Haas	6–3, 6–2
Men's singles Semifinals	(Italy) Jannik Sinner [1]	(United States) Ben Shelton [21]	7–6^{(7–2)}, 6–2, 6–2
Matches on Margaret Court Arena
Event	Winner	Loser	Score
Women's doubles Semifinals	(Czech Republic) Kateřina Siniaková [1] (United States) Taylor Townsend [1]	Mirra Andreeva; Diana Shnaider	6–7^{(4–7)}, 6–4, 6–3
Women's doubles Semifinals	(Chinese Taipei) Hsieh Su-wei [3] (Latvia) Jeļena Ostapenko [3]	(Canada) Gabriela Dabrowski [2] (New Zealand) Erin Routliffe [2]	7–6^{(7–3)}, 3–6, 6–3
Matches on Kia Arena
Event	Winner	Loser	Score
Mixed Legends' doubles 1st round	(Australia) Alicia Molik (Australia) Lleyton Hewitt	(Germany) Andrea Petkovic (United States) James Blake	7–5, 6–2
Wheelchair Quad doubles Final	(United Kingdom) Andy Lapthorne [2] (Netherlands) Sam Schröder [2]	(Israel) Guy Sasson [1] (Netherlands) Niels Vink [1]	6–1, 6–4
Wheelchair Men's doubles Final	(United Kingdom) Alfie Hewett [1] (United Kingdom) Gordon Reid [1]	(Spain) Daniel Caverzaschi (France) Stéphane Houdet	6–2, 6–4
Wheelchair Women's doubles Final	(China) Li Xiaohui (China) Wang Ziying	(Japan) Manami Tanaka (China) Zhu Zhenzhen	6–2, 6–3
Matches on 1573 Arena
Event	Winner	Loser	Score
Girls' singles Semifinals	(Japan) Wakana Sonobe [4]	(Australia) Emerson Jones [1]	6–3, 6–4
Boys' singles Semifinals	(Switzerland) Henry Bernet [8]	(Finland) Oskari Paldanius [7]	7–6^{(8–6)}, 6–2
Boys' doubles Final	(United States) Maxwell Exsted [2] (Czech Republic) Jan Kumstát [2]	(Serbia) Ognjen Milić; Egor Pleshivtsev	7–6^{(8–6)}, 6–3
Girls' doubles Final	(United States) Annika Penickova [6] (United States) Kristina Penickova [6]	(Australia) Emerson Jones [2] (United Kingdom) Hannah Klugman [2]	6–4, 6–2
Coloured background indicates a night match
Day matches began at 12 pm, whilst Night matches began at 7:30 pm AEDT

== Day 14 (25 January) ==
- Seeds out:
  - Women's singles: Aryna Sabalenka [1]
  - Men's doubles: (Italy) Simone Bolelli / (Italy) Andrea Vavassori [3]
- Schedule of Play

Matches on Main Courts
Matches on Rod Laver Arena
Event	Winner	Loser	Score
Boys' singles Final	(Switzerland) Henry Bernet [8]	(United States) Benjamin Willwerth	6–3, 6–4
Girls' singles Final	(Japan) Wakana Sonobe [4]	(United States) Kristina Penickova [6]	6–0, 6–1
Women's singles Final	(United States) Madison Keys [19]	Aryna Sabalenka [1]	6–3, 2–6, 7–5
Men's doubles Final	(Finland) Harri Heliövaara [6] (United Kingdom) Henry Patten [6]	(Italy) Simone Bolelli [3] (Italy) Andrea Vavassori [3]	6–7^{(16–18)}, 7–6^{(7–5)}, 6–3
Matches on Kia Arena
Event	Winner	Loser	Score
Wheelchair quad singles Final	(Netherlands) Sam Schröder [1]	(Netherlands) Niels Vink [2]	7–6^{(9–7)}, 7–5
Wheelchair women's singles Final	(Japan) Yui Kamiji [1]	(Netherlands) Aniek van Koot [2]	6–2, 6–2
Wheelchair men's singles Final	(United Kingdom) Alfie Hewett [2]	(Japan) Tokito Oda [1]	6–4, 6–4
Coloured background indicates a night match
Day matches began at 12 pm, whilst Night matches began at 7:30 pm AEDT

== Day 15 (26 January) ==
- Seeds out:
  - Men's singles: (Germany) Alexander Zverev [2]
  - Women's doubles: (Chinese Taipei) Hsieh Su-wei / (Latvia) Jeļena Ostapenko [3]
- Schedule of Play

Matches on Main Courts
Matches on Rod Laver Arena
Event	Winner	Loser	Score
Women's doubles Final	(Czech Republic) Kateřina Siniaková [1] (United States) Taylor Townsend [1]	(Chinese Taipei) Hsieh Su-wei [3] (Latvia) Jeļena Ostapenko [3]	6–2, 6–7^{(4–7)}, 6–3
Men's singles Final	(Italy) Jannik Sinner [1]	(Germany) Alexander Zverev [2]	6–3, 7–6^{(7–4)}, 6–3
Day match began at 3 pm, whilst Night match began at 7:30 pm AEDT
