= 2025 Australian Open – Wheelchair boys' doubles =

Tennis championship

Wheelchair boys' doubles
- 2025 Australian Open

Final
- Champions: (Brazil) Luiz Calixto (United States) Charlie Cooper
- Runners-up: (Belgium) Alexander Lantermann (Australia) Benjamin Wenzel
- Score: 6–3, 6–0

Events
Singles	men	women		boys	girls
Doubles	men	women	mixed	boys	girls
WC Singles	men	women	quad	boys	girls
WC Doubles	men	women	quad	boys	girls
- Australian Open

The 2025 Australian Open – Wheelchair boys' doubles was the inaugural edition of the junior wheelchair tournament at the first Grand Slam of the season. The competition took place at Melbourne Park, Melbourne, Australia, from January 20 to January 25, 2025.

Luiz Calixto and Charlie Cooper defeated Alexander Lantermann and Benjamin Wenzel 6–3, 6–0.

== Background ==
The 2025 Australian Open marked the first edition of junior wheelchair categories, both in singles and doubles. The addition of the event was celebrated as a milestone for the sport, promoting inclusion and providing a competitive platform for young Paralympic athletes.

== Draw ==
Key

- Q = Qualifier
- WC = Wild card
- LL = Lucky loser
- Alt = Alternate
- ITF = ITF entry
- PR = Protected ranking
- SR = Special ranking
- SE = Special exempt
- JE = Junior exempt
- JR = Junior Accelerator Programme entrant
- CO = College Accelerator Programme entrant
- NG = Next Gen Accelerator Program entrant
- w/o = Walkover
- r = Retired
- d = Defaulted

Final
(Brazil) Luiz Calixto (United States) Charlie Cooper	6	6
(Belgium) Alexander Lantermann (Australia) Benjamin Wenzel	3	0
