= 2025 Australian Open – Wheelchair girls' doubles =

Wheelchair girls' doubles
- 2025 Australian Open

Final
- Champions: (Belgium) Luna Gryp (Brazil) Vitória Miranda
- Runners-up: (United States) Sabina Czauz (Latvia) Ailina Mosko
- Score: 6–1, 6–1

Events
Singles	men	women		boys	girls
Doubles	men	women	mixed	boys	girls
WC Singles	men	women	quad	boys	girls
WC Doubles	men	women	quad	boys	girls
- Australian Open

The 2025 Australian Open – Wheelchair girls' doubles was the inaugural edition of the junior wheelchair tournament at the first Grand Slam of the season. The competition took place at Melbourne Park, Melbourne, Australia, from January 20 to January 25, 2025.

The Belgium-Brazil girls’ combo of Luna Gryp and Vitória Miranda took just two sets and 51 minutes to see off Sabina Czauz of the United States and Ailina Mosko of Latvia in the Australian Open Junior Wheelchair Championships.

“Winning would have been awesome, but it’s awesome just being in the final,” said Czauz. "Junior wheelchair tennis has come such a long way, from its beginnings at the US Open to Roland Garros and now the Australian Open. Hopefully Wimbledon next.”

== Background ==
The 2025 Australian Open marked the first edition of junior wheelchair categories, both in singles and doubles. The addition of the event was celebrated as a milestone for the sport, promoting inclusion and providing a competitive platform for young Paralympic athletes.

== Draw ==
Key

- Q = Qualifier
- WC = Wild card
- LL = Lucky loser
- Alt = Alternate
- ITF = ITF entry
- PR = Protected ranking
- SR = Special ranking
- SE = Special exempt
- JE = Junior exempt
- JR = Junior Accelerator Programme entrant
- CO = College Accelerator Programme entrant
- NG = Next Gen Accelerator Program entrant
- w/o = Walkover
- r = Retired
- d = Defaulted

Final
1	(Belgium) Luna Gryp (Brazil) Vitória Miranda	6	6
2	(United States) Sabina Czauz (Latvia) Ailina Mosko	1	1
