= 2025 Australian Open – Wheelchair girls' singles =

Wheelchair girls' singles
- 2025 Australian Open

Final
- Champion: (Brazil) Vitória Miranda
- Runner-up: (United States) Sabina Czauz
- Score: 0–6, 6–3, 7–6

Details
- Draw: 4
- Seeds: 2

Events
Singles	men	women		boys	girls
Doubles	men	women	mixed	boys	girls
WC Singles	men	women	quad	boys	girls
WC Doubles	men	women	quad	boys	girls
- Australian Open

The 2025 Australian Open – Wheelchair girls' singles was the inaugural edition of the junior wheelchair tournament at the first Grand Slam of the season. The competition took place at Melbourne Park, Melbourne, Australia, from January 20 to January 25, 2025.

Brazil's Vitória Miranda claimed the title by defeating USA's Sabina Czauz in the final, with set scores of 0–6, 6–3, 7–6. With this victory, Miranda became the first champion in the event's history.

== Seeds ==
1. (Brazil) Vitória Miranda (champion)
2. (Belgium) Luna Gryp (round robin)

== Format ==
The tournament followed a round robin format, with the two best players reaching the final.

== Final ==
In the championship match, Vitória Miranda won by two sets to one against the American Sabina Czauz, who won the first set by 6-0, but the Brazilian recovered, and won the next two sets, by 6-3 and 7-6.
