= Lea Nilsson =

Swedish tennis player (born 2008)

- Country (sports): Sweden
- Born: 24 June 2008 (age 18) Stockholm, Sweden
- Prize money: $26,516

Singles
- Career record: 42–22
- Career titles: 2 ITF
- Highest ranking: No. 347 (9 November 2026)
- Current ranking: No. 347 (9 November 2026)

Grand Slam singles results
- Australian Open Junior: 2R (2025)
- French Open Junior: 1R (2026)
- Wimbledon Junior: 2R (2025)
- US Open Junior: F (2025)

Doubles
- Career record: 8–8
- Career titles: 0
- Highest ranking: No. 619 (2 November 2026)
- Current ranking: No. 624 (9 November 2026)

Grand Slam doubles results
- Australian Open Junior: 1R (2025)
- French Open Junior: 3R (2026)
- Wimbledon Junior: 2R (2025)
- US Open Junior: 2R (2025)
- Last updated on: 15 November 2026.

Lea Nilsson (born 24 June 2008) is a Swedish professional tennis player. She has a career high WTA singles ranking of world No. 347 achieved on 9 November 2026 and a doubles ranking of No. 619 achieved on achieved on 2 November 2026.

== Early life ==
From Stockholm, Nilsson started playing tennis at the age of three years-old, and was later coached by Milos Sekulic.

== Career ==
In 2024, she made her debut for the Swedish Billie Jean King Cup team at the age of 15 years and eight months, when she also became the youngest Swedish player ever to win a match for the national team, winning against Çağla Büyükakçay from Turkey in three sets, taking the age-record previously held by Bjorn Borg.

Nilsson reached the final of the girls' singles at the 2025 US Open, recording a win over number one seed Julieta Pareja in the round of 16, before beating Charo Esquiva Bañuls of Spain, and then defending champion Mika Stojsavljevic of Great Britain in the semifinal. She was subsequently beaten by Belgian Jeline Vandromme in the final.

On 16 November 2025, playing on the ITF World Tennis Tour, Nilsson reached the final of the W50 Funchal event in Madeira, Portugal where she faced top seed Tamara Korpatsch of Germany, losing in three sets.

In July 2026, she reached the ladies final at the W50 Horb tennis tournament in Germany, playing second seed Back Da-yeon of South Korea in the final, winning in straight sets.

== ITF Circuit finals ==
=== Singles: 3 (2 titles, 1 runner-up) ===
Legend W50 tournaments (1–1) W35 tournaments (1–0)	Finals by surface Hard (0–1) Clay (2–0)

Result	W–L	Date	Tournament	Tier	Surface	Opponent	Score
Loss	0–1	Nov 2025	ITF Funchal, Portugal	W50	Hard	(Germany) Tamara Korpatsch	7–5, 5–7, 1–6
Win	1–1	Jun 2026	ITF Ystad, Sweden	W35	Clay	(United States) Madison Sieg	4–6, 6–2, 6–0
Win	2–1	Jul 2026	ITF Horb, Germany	W50	Clay	(South Korea) Back Da-yeon	7–6^{(7–3)}, 6–2

== Junior Grand Slam tournament finals ==
=== Singles: 1 (runner-up) ===
Result	Year	Tournament	Surface	Opponent	Score
Loss	2025	US Open	Hard	(Belgium) Jeline Vandromme	6–7^{(2–7)}, 2–6
