= 2025 Australian Open – Boys' singles =

Boys' singles
- 2025 Australian Open

Final
- Champion: (Switzerland) Henry Bernet
- Runner-up: (United States) Benjamin Willwerth
- Score: 6–3, 6–4

Details
- Draw: 64
- Seeds: 16

Events
Singles	men	women		boys	girls
Doubles	men	women	mixed	boys	girls
WC Singles	men	women	quad	boys	girls
WC Doubles	men	women	quad	boys	girls
- Australian Open

Henry Bernet won the boys' singles title at the 2025 Australian Open, defeating Benjamin Willwerth in the final, 6–3, 6–4.

Rei Sakamoto was the reigning champion, but he was no longer eligible to participate in junior events. He received a wild card into the men's singles qualifying, where he lost to Tristan Boyer in the first round.

== Seeds ==
1. (Czech Republic) Jan Kumstát (quarterfinals)
2. (Kazakhstan) Amir Omarkhanov (third round)
3. (Spain) Andrés Santamarta Roig (second round)
4. (United States) Jack Kennedy (quarterfinals)
5. (United States) Jagger Leach (semifinals)
6. (United Kingdom) Oliver Bonding (first round, retired)
7. (Finland) Oskari Paldanius (semifinals)
8. (Switzerland) Henry Bernet (champion)
9. Timofei Derepasko (quarterfinals)
10. (United States) Maxwell Exsted (second round)
11. (Switzerland) Flynn Thomas (third round)
12. (Italy) Andrea de Marchi (second round)
13. (France) Moïse Kouamé (third round)
14. (Sweden) William Rejchtman Vinciguerra (quarterfinals)
15. (Poland) Alan Ważny (first round)
16. (Bulgaria) Alexander Vasilev (third round)

Click on the seed number of a player to go to their draw section.

== Draw ==
Key

- Q = Qualifier
- WC = Wild card
- LL = Lucky loser
- Alt = Alternate
- ITF = ITF entry
- PR = Protected ranking
- SR = Special ranking
- SE = Special exempt
- JE = Junior exempt
- JR = Junior Accelerator Programme entrant
- CO = College Accelerator Programme entrant
- NG = Next Gen Accelerator Program entrant
- w/o = Walkover
- r = Retired
- d = Defaulted

=== Finals ===
Quarterfinals
1	(Czech Republic) Jan Kumstát	6^{4}	6^{2}
8	(Switzerland) Henry Bernet	7^{7}	7^{7}
4	(United States) Jack Kennedy	6^{6}	5
7	(Finland) Oskari Paldanius	7^{8}	7
9	Timofei Derepasko	4	4
(United States) Benjamin Willwerth	6	6
5	(United States) Jagger Leach	6	7
14	(Sweden) William Rejchtman Vinciguerra	1	5

Semifinals
8	(Switzerland) Henry Bernet	7^{8}	6
7	(Finland) Oskari Paldanius	6^{6}	2
(United States) Benjamin Willwerth	6^{4}	6	6
5	(United States) Jagger Leach	7^{7}	4	2

Final
8	(Switzerland) Henry Bernet	6	6
(United States) Benjamin Willwerth	3	4

=== Top half ===
==== Section 1 ====
First round
1	(Czech Republic) Jan Kumstát	6	6
(United States) Maximus Dussault	2	2
(Australia) Cruz Hewitt	6	6
Q	(South Korea) Kim Moo-been	3	3
(Italy) Jacopo Vasamì	6	6
(Germany) Jamie Mackenzie	4	1
(Romania) Alejandro Mateo Berge Nourescu	2	5
13	(France) Moïse Kouamé	6	7
10	(United States) Maxwell Exsted	6	6
WC	(Australia) Cooper Kose	3	4
Q	(South Africa) Connor Doig	3	2
(Serbia) Ognjen Milić	6	6
WC	(Japan) Naoto Tomizawa	6	4	6
(Turkey) Haydar Cem Gökpınar	3	6	2
(Brazil) Luis Guto Miguel	3	1
8	(Switzerland) Henry Bernet	6	6

Second round
1	(Czech Republic) J Kumstát	6	7^{9}
(Australia) C Hewitt	3	6^{7}
(Italy) J Vasamì	3	6^{7}
13	(France) M Kouamé	6	7^{9}
10	(United States) M Exsted	7^{7}	2	2
(Serbia) O Milić	6^{5}	6	6
WC	(Japan) N Tomizawa	3	4
8	(Switzerland) H Bernet	6	6

Third round
1	(Czech Republic) J Kumstát	6	3	6
13	(France) M Kouamé	3	6	3
(Serbia) O Milić	6	6^{6}	6^{2}
8	(Switzerland) H Bernet	4	7^{8}	7^{10}

Quarterfinals
1	(Czech Republic) J Kumstát	6^{4}	6^{2}
8	(Switzerland) H Bernet	7^{7}	7^{7}

==== Section 2 ====
First round
4	(United States) Jack Kennedy	3	6	7^{10}
WC	(Australia) Daniel Jovanovski	6	3	6^{4}
(Morocco) Karim Bennani	6	6
Q	(United Kingdom) Mark Ceban	4	4
(Kazakhstan) Zangar Nurlanuly	6	3	6
WC	(Australia) Nikolas Baker	2	6	3
Q	(Germany) Tom Sickenberger	6	2	4
16	(Bulgaria) Alexander Vasilev	4	6	6
12	(Italy) Andrea de Marchi	7	6
(United States) Noah Johnston	5	4
Egor Pleshivtsev	6	6
(Japan) Ryō Tabata	2	1
WC	(Australia) Ethan Domingo	2	6^{3}
(Sweden) Ludvig Hede	6	7^{7}
(India) Rethin Pranav Senthil Kumar	7	4	0
7	(Finland) Oskari Paldanius	5	6	6

Second round
4	(United States) J Kennedy	7	7
(Morocco) K Bennani	5	5
(Kazakhstan) Z Nurlanuly	2	4
16	(Bulgaria) A Vasilev	6	6
12	(Italy) A de Marchi	2	6	1
E Pleshivtsev	6	1	6
(Sweden) L Hede	3	2
7	(Finland) O Paldanius	6	6

Third round
4	(United States) J Kennedy	3	6	6
16	(Bulgaria) A Vasilev	6	2	3
E Pleshivtsev	3	2
7	(Finland) O Paldanius	6	6

Quarterfinals
4	(United States) J Kennedy	6^{6}	5
7	(Finland) O Paldanius	7^{8}	7

=== Bottom half ===
==== Section 3 ====
First round
6	(United Kingdom) Oliver Bonding	7^{10}	3	1^{r}
(Chinese Taipei) Chen Kuan-shou	6^{8}	6	4
(Ukraine) Nikita Bilozertsev	4	6	6^{8}
(United States) Dominick Mosejczuk	6	2	7^{10}
Q	(Japan) Hyu Kawanishi	6	1	4
(Australia) Duje Markovina	4	6	6
(Romania) Ștefan Horia Haita	2	3
9	Timofei Derepasko	6	6
15	(Poland) Alan Ważny	3	3
(United States) Benjamin Willwerth	6	6
(Switzerland) Nikola Djosic	6	6
(India) Kriish Tyagi	1	2
WC	(Australia) Jake Dembo	7^{7}	6^{5}	1
Q	(Italy) Pierluigi Basile	6^{4}	7^{7}	6
Q	(Japan) Hiromasa Koyama	7^{7}	3	0
3	(Spain) Andrés Santamarta Roig	6^{5}	6	6

Second round
(Chinese Taipei) K-s Chen	3	4
(United States) D Mosejczuk	6	6
(Australia) D Markovina	4	4
9	T Derepasko	6	6
(United States) B Willwerth	6	7^{7}
(Switzerland) N Djosic	3	6^{5}
Q	(Italy) P Basile	6	1	6
3	(Spain) A Santamarta Roig	3	6	4

Third round
(United States) D Mosejczuk	6^{3}	3
9	T Derepasko	7^{7}	6
(United States) B Willwerth	7^{7}	7
Q	(Italy) P Basile	6^{3}	5

Quarterfinals
9	T Derepasko	4	4
(United States) B Willwerth	6	6

==== Section 4 ====
First round
5	(United States) Jagger Leach	6	6
Ivan Iutkin	4	3
(Japan) Shion Itsusaki	1	6^{3}
Q	(Italy) Gabriele Crivellaro	6	7^{7}
(Germany) Niels McDonald	3	2
(Romania) Yannick Theodor Alexandrescou	6	6
(Australia) Ty Host	4	3
11	(Switzerland) Flynn Thomas	6	6
14	(Sweden) William Rejchtman Vinciguerra	6	3	7^{10}
(Austria) Thilo Behrmann	4	6	6^{7}
(South Korea) Jeong Yeon-su	6	6
WC	(Australia) Jeffrey Strydom	4	1
SE	(Brazil) Pedro Albuquerque Dietrich	5	3
WC	(Australia) Ymerali Ibraimi	7	6
(United States) Matisse Farzam	6^{3}	6^{8}
2	(Kazakhstan) Amir Omarkhanov	7^{7}	7^{10}

Second round
5	(United States) J Leach	6	6
Q	(Italy) G Crivellaro	4	4
(Romania) YT Alexandrescou	6	4	2
11	(Switzerland) F Thomas	4	6	6
14	(Sweden) W Rejchtman Vinciguerra	6	6
(South Korea) Y-s Jeong	2	0
WC	(Australia) Y Ibraimi	4	3
2	(Kazakhstan) A Omarkhanov	6	6

Third round
5	(United States) J Leach	6	5	7^{10}
11	(Switzerland) F Thomas	3	7	6^{6}
14	(Sweden) W Rejchtman Vinciguerra	4	6	7^{10}
2	(Kazakhstan) A Omarkhanov	6	4	6^{6}

Quarterfinals
5	(United States) J Leach	6	7
14	(Sweden) W Rejchtman Vinciguerra	1	5

== Qualifying ==
=== Seeds ===
1. (Italy) Michele Mecarelli (qualifying competition)
2. (Italy) Gabriele Crivellaro (qualified)
3. (Italy) Pierluigi Basile (qualified)
4. (Germany) Tom Sickenberger (qualified)
5. (South Korea) Kim Moo-been (qualified)
6. (United Kingdom) Mark Ceban (qualified)
7. (Japan) Hiromasa Koyama (qualified)
8. (South Africa) Connor Doig (qualified)
9. (United Kingdom) Conor Brady (qualifying competition)
10. (New Zealand) Kai Milburn (qualifying competition)
11. (Romania) Tudor Batin (qualifying competition)
12. (Hungary) Kolos Kincses (first round)
13. (Japan) Kohshi Ishibashi (first round)
14. (Hungary) Botond Nagy (qualifying competition)
15. (China) Xia Yue (qualifying competition)
16. (Latvia) Artūrs Žagars (first round)

=== Qualifiers ===
1. (Japan) Hyu Kawanishi
2. (Italy) Gabriele Crivellaro
3. (Italy) Pierluigi Basile
4. (Germany) Tom Sickenberger
5. (South Korea) Kim Moo-been
6. (United Kingdom) Mark Ceban
7. (Japan) Hiromasa Koyama
8. (South Africa) Connor Doig

=== Draw ===
==== First qualifier ====
First round
1	(Italy) Michele Mecarelli	6	6
WC	(Australia) Heaton Pann	2	1
(Japan) Hyu Kawanishi	6	3	6
12	(Hungary) Kolos Kincses	4	6	4

Qualifying competition
1	(Italy) Michele Mecarelli	5	3
(Japan) Hyu Kawanishi	7	6

==== Second qualifier ====
First round
2	(Italy) Gabriele Crivellaro	6	6
(Japan) Yoshito Oda	1	2
(Australia) Ashton McLeod	2	6	6^{8}
9	(United Kingdom) Conor Brady	6	0	7^{10}

Qualifying competition
2	(Italy) Gabriele Crivellaro	6	6
9	(United Kingdom) Conor Brady	4	2

==== Third qualifier ====
First round
3	(Italy) Pierluigi Basile	6	6
WC	(Australia) Lucas Han	2	1
(Japan) Hikaru Takahashi	3	4
10	(New Zealand) Kai Milburn	6	6

Qualifying competition
3	(Italy) Pierluigi Basile	6	6
10	(New Zealand) Kai Milburn	1	1

==== Fourth qualifier ====
First round
4	(Germany) Tom Sickenberger	6	3	6
WC	(Australia) Rohan Hazratwala	4	6	3
(United States) Jacob Lee	7^{7}	6
13	(Japan) Kohshi Ishibashi	6^{5}	3

Qualifying competition
4	(Germany) Tom Sickenberger	6	6
WC	(United States) Jacob Lee	1	1

==== Fifth qualifier ====
First round
5	(South Korea) Kim Moo-been	7	6
WC	(Australia) Connor McEvoy	5	3
(Australia) Chase Zhao	2	1
14	(Hungary) Botond Nagy	6	6

Qualifying competition
5	(South Korea) Kim Moo-been	5	6	6
14	(Hungary) Botond Nagy	7	4	3

==== Sixth qualifier ====
First round
6	(United Kingdom) Mark Ceban	6	6
(Australia) Aryan Karnani	3	4
WC	(Australia) Jonas Hahn	6	4	7^{12}
16	(Latvia) Artūrs Žagars	2	6	6^{10}

Qualifying competition
6	(United Kingdom) Mark Ceban	6	6
WC	(Australia) Jonas Hahn	3	0

==== Seventh qualifier ====
First round
7	(Japan) Hiromasa Koyama	7	0	7
(Poland) Filip Kosiński	5	6	5
(Australia) Lachlan McFadzean	6	1	3
11	(Romania) Tudor Batin	3	6	6

Qualifying competition
7	(Japan) Hiromasa Koyama	6	6
11	(Romania) Tudor Batin	1	4

==== Eighth qualifier ====
First round
8	(South Africa) Connor Doig	7^{7}	6
(Hong Kong) Jack Cheng	6^{3}	3
(Australia) Jerome Estephan	7^{7}	4	6
15	(China) Xia Yue	6^{3}	6	1

Qualifying competition
8	(South Africa) Connor Doig	6	6
(Australia) Jerome Estephan	2	4
