= 2025 Australian Open – Wheelchair boys' singles =

Wheelchair boys' singles
- 2025 Australian Open

Final
- Champion: (United States) Charlie Cooper
- Runner-up: (Belgium) Alexander Lantermann
- Score: 6–2, 6–2

Details
- Draw: 4
- Seeds: 2

Events
Singles	men	women		boys	girls
Doubles	men	women	mixed	boys	girls
WC Singles	men	women	quad
WC Doubles	men	women	quad
- Australian Open

The 2025 Australian Open – Wheelchair boys' singles was the inaugural edition of the junior wheelchair tournament at the first Grand Slam of the season. The competition took place at Melbourne Park, Melbourne, Australia, from January 20 to January 25, 2025.

In a comprehensive boys' singles final, No.1-ranked junior, American Charlie Cooper, put in a dominant display to win 6-2 6–2 over Belgian second seed, Alexander Lantermann.

== Seeds ==
1. (United States) Charlie Cooper (champion)
2. (Belgium) Alexander Lantermann (final)

== Background ==
The 2025 Australian Open marked the first edition of junior wheelchair categories, both in singles and doubles. The addition of the event was celebrated as a milestone for the sport, promoting inclusion and providing a competitive platform for young Paralympic athletes.

== Format ==
The tournament followed a round robin format, with the two best players reaching the final. The event featured some of the most promising young wheelchair tennis players, ensuring a high level of competition.

== Final ==
In the championship match, Charlie Cooper won the final by 2 sets to 0 against the Belgian Alexander Lantermann, winning both sets 6–2.
