= 2025 Australian Open – Wheelchair men's singles =

Wheelchair men's singles
- 2025 Australian Open

Final
- Champion: (United Kingdom) Alfie Hewett
- Runner-up: (Japan) Tokito Oda
- Score: 6–4, 6–4

Details
- Draw: 16
- Seeds: 4

Events
Singles	men	women		boys	girls
Doubles	men	women	mixed	boys	girls
WC Singles	men	women	quad	boys	girls
WC Doubles	men	women	quad	boys	girls
- Australian Open

Alfie Hewett defeated defending champion Tokito Oda in a rematch of the previous two years' finals, 6–4, 6–4 to win the men's singles wheelchair tennis title at the 2025 Australian Open. It was his second Australian Open singles title and tenth major singles title overall.

== Seeds ==
1. (Japan) Tokito Oda (final)
2. (United Kingdom) Alfie Hewett (champion)
3. (Spain) Martín de la Puente (semifinals)
4. (Argentina) Gustavo Fernández (semifinals)

== Draw ==
Key

- Q = Qualifier
- WC = Wild card
- LL = Lucky loser
- Alt = Alternate
- ITF = ITF entry
- PR = Protected ranking
- SR = Special ranking
- SE = Special exempt
- JE = Junior exempt
- JR = Junior Accelerator Programme entrant
- CO = College Accelerator Programme entrant
- NG = Next Gen Accelerator Program entrant
- w/o = Walkover
- r = Retired
- d = Defaulted

=== Draw ===
First round
1	(Japan) Tokito Oda	6	6
WC	(Australia) Anderson Parker	0	3
(Netherlands) Tom Egberink	1	1
(Japan) Takashi Sanada	6	6
3	(Spain) Martín de la Puente	6	6
Q	(China) Ji Zhenxu	1	1
Q	(Japan) Daisuke Arai	6	5	6
(Spain) Daniel Caverzaschi	4	7	3
(Belgium) Joachim Gérard	3	7^{7}	4
(United Kingdom) Gordon Reid	6	6^{5}	6
(Japan) Takuya Miki	6^{7}	1
4	(Argentina) Gustavo Fernández	7^{9}	6
WC	(United States) Casey Ratzlaff	5	5
(Netherlands) Ruben Spaargaren	7	7
(France) Stéphane Houdet	4	2
2	(United Kingdom) Alfie Hewett	6	6

Quarterfinals
1	(Japan) T Oda	6	6
(Japan) T Sanada	1	0
3	(Spain) M de la Puente	6	6
Q	(Japan) D Arai	3	2
(United Kingdom) G Reid	3	7^{8}	1
4	(Argentina) G Fernández	6	6^{6}	6
(Netherlands) R Spaargaren	0	0
2	(United Kingdom) A Hewett	6	6

Semifinals
1	(Japan) T Oda	6	6
3	(Spain) M de la Puente	1	1
4	(Argentina) G Fernández	3	3
2	(United Kingdom) A Hewett	6	6

Final
1	(Japan) T Oda	4	4
2	(United Kingdom) A Hewett	6	6

== Qualifying ==
=== Seeds ===
1. (Chile) Alexander Cataldo (qualifying competition)
2. (Netherlands) Maikel Scheffers (qualifying competition)

=== Qualifiers ===
1. (Japan) Daisuke Arai
2. (China) Ji Zhenxu

=== Qualifying draw ===
Qualifying competition
1	(Chile) Alexander Cataldo	3	3
(Japan) Daisuke Arai	6	6
Qualifying competition
WC	(China) Ji Zhenxu	6	5	6
2	(Netherlands) Maikel Scheffers	3	7	2
