= 2025 Australian Open – Boys' doubles =

Boys' doubles
- 2025 Australian Open

Final
- Champions: (United States) Maxwell Exsted (Czech Republic) Jan Kumstát
- Runners-up: (Serbia) Ognjen Milić; Egor Pleshivtsev
- Score: 7–6^{(8–6)}, 6–3

Details
- Draw: 32
- Seeds: 8

Events
Singles	men	women		boys	girls
Doubles	men	women	mixed	boys	girls
WC Singles	men	women	quad	boys	girls
WC Doubles	men	women	quad	boys	girls
- Australian Open

Maxwell Exsted and Jan Kumstát won the title, defeating Ognjen Milić and Egor Pleshivtsev in the final, 7–6^{(8–6)}, 6–3.

Exsted and Cooper Woestendick were the reigning champions, but Woestendick is no longer eligible to participate in junior events.

== Seeds ==
1. (United Kingdom) Oliver Bonding / (United States) Jagger Leach (semifinals)
2. (United States) Maxwell Exsted / (Czech Republic) Jan Kumstát (champions)
3. Timofei Derepasko / (Kazakhstan) Amir Omarkhanov (first round)
4. (France) Moïse Kouamé / (Spain) Andrés Santamarta Roig (quarterfinals, withdrew)
5. (Switzerland) Henry Bernet / (Switzerland) Flynn Thomas (first round)
6. (Finland) Oskari Paldanius / (Poland) Alan Ważny (first round)
7. (Italy) Andrea de Marchi / (Sweden) William Rejchtman Vinciguerra (semifinals)
8. (United States) Noah Johnston / (United States) Benjamin Willwerth (quarterfinals)

== Draw ==
Key

- Q = Qualifier
- WC = Wild card
- LL = Lucky loser
- Alt = Alternate
- ITF = ITF entry
- PR = Protected ranking
- SR = Special ranking
- SE = Special exempt
- JE = Junior exempt
- JR = Junior Accelerator Programme entrant
- CO = College Accelerator Programme entrant
- NG = Next Gen Accelerator Program entrant
- w/o = Walkover
- r = Retired
- d = Defaulted

=== Finals ===
Semifinals
1	(United Kingdom) Oliver Bonding (United States) Jagger Leach	5	7	[7]
(Serbia) Ognjen Milić; Egor Pleshivtsev	7	5	[10]
7	(Italy) Andrea de Marchi (Sweden) William Rejchtman Vinciguerra	3	7^{7}	[8]
2	(United States) Maxwell Exsted (Czech Republic) Jan Kumstát	6	6^{2}	[10]

Final
(Serbia) Ognjen Milić; Egor Pleshivtsev	6^{6}	3
2	(United States) Maxwell Exsted (Czech Republic) Jan Kumstát	7^{8}	6

=== Top half ===
First round
1	(United Kingdom) Oliver Bonding (United States) Jagger Leach	6	6
(Romania) Yannick Theodor Alexandrescou (Austria) Thilo Behrmann	4	4
(Chinese Taipei) Chen Kuan-shou (South Korea) Kim Moo-been	6	6
WC	(Australia) Jerome Estephan (Australia) Daniel Jovanovski	4	4
WC	(Australia) Jake Dembo (Australia) Rohan Hazratwala	6	3	[10]
(Japan) Hyu Kawanishi (Japan) Hiromasa Koyama	2	6	[12]
(Germany) Jamie Mackenzie (Germany) Niels McDonald	7^{7}	6
5	(Switzerland) Henry Bernet (Switzerland) Flynn Thomas	6^{5}	3
3	Timofei Derepasko (Kazakhstan) Amir Omarkhanov	6^{4}	6	[6]
(Morocco) Karim Bennani (Bulgaria) Alexander Vasilev	7^{7}	1	[10]
(United States) Maximus Dussault (United States) Dominick Mosejczuk	6	4	[8]
(Serbia) Ognjen Milić; Egor Pleshivtsev	3	6	[10]
(Italy) Pierluigi Basile (Italy) Jacopo Vasamì	6	6
WC	(Australia) Jonas Hahn (Australia) Ymerali Ibraimi	4	4
(Brazil) Luís Miguel (Germany) Tom Sickenberger	7^{7}	6
6	(Finland) Oskari Paldanius (Poland) Alan Ważny	6^{3}	3

Second round
1	(United Kingdom) O Bonding (United States) J Leach	7	6
(Chinese Taipei) K-s Chen (South Korea) M-b Kim	5	2
(Japan) H Kawanishi (Japan) H Koyama	4	3
(Germany) J Mackenzie (Germany) N McDonald	6	6
(Morocco) K Bennani (Bulgaria) A Vasilev	6^{3}	1
(Serbia) O Milić; E Pleshivtsev	7^{7}	6
(Italy) P Basile (Italy) J Vasamì	6^{4}	6^{5}
(Brazil) L Miguel (Germany) T Sickenberger	7^{7}	7^{7}

Quarterfinals
1	(United Kingdom) O Bonding (United States) J Leach	6	6^{5}	[10]
(Germany) J Mackenzie (Germany) N McDonald	0	7^{7}	[6]
(Serbia) O Milić; E Pleshivtsev	2	7^{7}	[10]
(Brazil) L Miguel (Germany) T Sickenberger	6	6^{2}	[2]

Semifinals
1	(United Kingdom) O Bonding (United States) J Leach	5	7	[7]
(Serbia) O Milić; E Pleshivtsev	7	5	[10]

=== Bottom half ===
First round
7	(Italy) Andrea de Marchi (Sweden) William Rejchtman Vinciguerra	6	6
(Brazil) Pedro Albuquerque Dietrich (South Africa) Connor Doig	4	4
(Japan) Shion Itsusaki (Japan) Ryo Tabata	6^{3}	7	[9]
WC	(Australia) Ashton Mcleod (Australia) Lachlan McFadzean	7^{7}	5	[11]
(Switzerland) Nikola Djosic (Sweden) Ludvig Hede	7	6
(United Kingdom) Conor Brady (United States) Jack Kennedy	5	4
(Ukraine) Nikita Bilozertsev (United Kingdom) Mark Ceban	5	3
4	(France) Moïse Kouamé (Spain) Andrés Santamarta Roig	7	6
8	(United States) Noah Johnston (United States) Benjamin Willwerth	6^{5}	6	[10]
(Turkey) Haydar Cem Gökpınar; Ivan Iutkin	7^{7}	3	5
(Australia) Cruz Hewitt (Australia) Duje Markovina	2	6	[4]
(Kazakhstan) Zangar Nurlanuly (India) Kriish Tyagi	6	1	[10]
(South Korea) Jeong Yeon-su (India) Rethin Pranav Senthil Kumar	3	2
(United States) Matisse Farzam (Australia) Ty Host	6	6
(Romania) Alejandro Mateo Berge Nourescu (Romania) Ștefan Horia Haita	6	3	[2]
2	(United States) Maxwell Exsted (Czech Republic) Jan Kumstát	2	6	[10]

Second round
7	(Italy) A de Marchi (Sweden) W Rejchtman Vinciguerra	6	7^{7}
WC	(Australia) A Mcleod (Australia) L McFadzean	4	6^{2}
(Switzerland) N Djosic (Sweden) L Hede	3	5
4	(France) M Kouamé (Spain) A Santamarta Roig	6	7
8	(United States) N Johnston (United States) B Willwerth	6	6
(Kazakhstan) Z Nurlanuly (India) K Tyagi	1	1
(United States) M Farzam (Australia) T Host	1	5
2	(United States) M Exsted (Czech Republic) J Kumstát	6	7

Quarterfinals
7	(Italy) A de Marchi (Sweden) W Rejchtman Vinciguerra	w/o
4	(France) M Kouamé (Spain) A Santamarta Roig
8	(United States) N Johnston (United States) B Willwerth	7^{8}	2	[9]
2	(United States) M Exsted (Czech Republic) J Kumstát	6^{6}	6	[11]

Semifinals
7	(Italy) A de Marchi (Sweden) W Rejchtman Vinciguerra	3	7^{7}	[8]
2	(United States) M Exsted (Czech Republic) J Kumstát	6	6^{2}	[10]
