= Ognjen Milić =

Serbian tennis player (born 2007)

- Country (sports): Serbia
- Born: 22 June 2007 (age 19) Ptolemaida, Greece
- Height: 1.80 m (5 ft 11 in)
- Plays: Left-handed (two-handed backhand)
- Coach: Vuk Bolic
- Prize money: US $38,372

Singles
- Career record: 0–1
- Career titles: 0
- Highest ranking: No. 336 (27 July 2026)
- Current ranking: No. 336 (27 July 2026)

Grand Slam singles results
- Australian Open Junior: 3R (2025)
- French Open Junior: 1R (2025)

Doubles
- Career record: 0–0
- Career titles: 0
- Highest ranking: No. 1,879 (20 April 2026)
- Current ranking: No. 1,993 (27 July 2026)

Grand Slam doubles results
- Australian Open Junior: F (2025)
- French Open Junior: 2R (2025)

Team competitions
- Davis Cup: 1–1 (Sin. 1–1, Dbs. 0–0)
- Last updated on: 27 July 2026.

Ognjen Milić (born 22 June 2007) is a Serbian professional tennis player. He has a career high ATP singles ranking of world No. 336 achieved on 27 July 2026 and a doubles ranking of No. 1,879 achieved in April 2026. He also achieved a junior ranking of No. 20 achieved on 6 January 2025.

He represents Serbia at the Davis Cup, where he has a win-loss record of 0–1.

== Early life ==
Milić was born in Greece in a sporting family, his father Nikola was a football player and his mother Jasmina was a basketball player. He has one sister.

Milić lived in Kragujevac, in Serbia. He became European U14 champion in 2021.

== Career ==
He reached the final of the Boys' doubles at the 2025 Australian Open alongside Egor Pleshivtsev, beating Jagger Leach and Oliver Bonding in the semi-finals, before being defeated by Jan Kumstát and Maxwell Exsted in the final.

In 2026, he was called-up to play Davis Cup tennis for Serbia against Chile, making his debut.

== Junior Grand Slam finals ==
=== Doubles: 1 (1 runner-up) ===
| Result | Year | Tournament | Surface | Partner | Opponents | Score |
|---|---|---|---|---|---|---|
| Loss | 2025 | Australian Open | Hard | Egor Pleshivtsev | (United States) Maxwell Exsted (Czech Republic) Jan Kumstát | 6-7, 3-6 |
