= Wakana Sonobe =

Japanese tennis player (born 2008)

- Country (sports): Japan
- Born: 17 January 2008 (age 18)
- Plays: Left-handed (two-handed backhand)
- Prize money: $88,707

Singles
- Career record: 56–36
- Career titles: 1 ITF
- Highest ranking: No. 224 (10 November 2025)
- Current ranking: No. 506 (4 May 2026)

Grand Slam singles results
- Australian Open Junior: W (2025)
- French Open Junior: 3R (2024)
- Wimbledon Junior: 3R (2024)
- US Open Junior: F (2024)

Doubles
- Career record: 23–19
- Career titles: 1 ITF
- Highest ranking: No. 414 (24 November 2025)
- Current ranking: No. 451 (4 May 2026)

Grand Slam doubles results
- Australian Open Junior: QF (2025)
- French Open Junior: QF (2024)
- Wimbledon Junior: QF (2024)
- US Open Junior: SF (2023)
- Last updated on: 16 May 2026.

Wakana Sonobe (園部八奏, Sonobe Wakana, born 17 January 2008) is a Japanese professional tennis player. She won the girls' singles at the 2025 Australian Open and reached the final of the girls' singles at the 2024 US Open.

== Early life ==
From Saitama Prefecture, she started playing tennis at four years-old, and briefly did ballet as a youngster. She won the Japanese U14 national tennis title in singles in 2021. She became based at the IMG Academy in the United States in February 2022.

== Juniors ==
=== 2023 ===
She made her junior major debut at the 2023 Australian Open where she reached the second round with partner Emerson Jones. Playing the girls' singles at the 2023 Wimbledon Championships she was defeated by British player Mika Stojsavljevic in the first round. She lost to Stojsavljevic again in the first round of the 2023 US Open girls' singles but reached the semifinals in the doubles alongside compatriot Hayu Kinoshita.

=== 2024 ===
Playing alongside Mika Stojsavljevic, she reached the quarterfinals of the girls' doubles at the 2024 French Open, and they were defeated by eventual winners Iva Jovic and Tyra Caterina Grant. She reached the third round of the singles but lost to Tereza Valentová.

She reached the quarterfinals of the girls' doubles alongside Iva Ivanova of Bulgaria at the 2024 Wimbledon Championships. She reached the third round of the girls' singles where she lost to Iva Jovic.

In September 2024, she defeated Mingge Xu to reach the final of the girls' singles at the 2024 US Open. She lost in the final to British player Mika Stojsavljevic.

== Professional ==
=== 2025: WTA Tour debut and first win ===
She made a second consecutive major final in the girls' singles at the Australian Open, defeating Australian Tahlia Kokkinis and Emerson Jones in the quarterfinal and semifinal, respectively, before beating American Kristina Penickova in straight sets the final. Alongside Mika Stojsavljevic, she also reached the quarterfinals of the at the girls' doubles at the championships.

Sonobe qualified to make her WTA Tour main-draw debut at the WTA 500 Abu Dhabi Open and recorded her first tour-level win over Yuan Yue in the first round. She lost in the second round to Ons Jabeur.

Sonobe announced that she turned professional on 8 October 2025.

== ITF Circuit finals ==
=== Singles: 4 (1 title, 3 runner-ups) ===
Legend W100 tournaments W15 tournaments	Finals by surface Hard (1–1) Clay (0–2)

Result	W–L	Date	Tournament	Tier	Surface	Opponent	Score
Loss	0–1	Sep 2022	ITF Cancún, Mexico	W15	Hard	(United States) Ava Markham	3–6, 6–3, 1–6
Loss	0–2	Sep 2023	ITF Hilton Head, United States	W15	Clay	(France) Sophia Biolay	6–4, 2–6, 4–6
Loss	0–3	Apr 2024	ITF Kuršumlijska Banja, Serbia	W15	Clay	(Romania) Carmen Andreea Herea	6–7^{(6)}, 6–4, 4–6
Win	1–3	Apr 2025	Ando Securities Open, Japan	W100	Hard	(Japan) Ena Shibahara	6–4, 6–7^{(1)}, 6–3

=== Doubles: 5 (1 title, 4 runner-ups) ===
Legend W75 tournaments (0–2) W50 tournaments (1–0) W15 tournaments (0–2)	Finals by surface Hard (1–1) Clay (0–3)

Result	W–L	Date	Tournament	Tier	Surface	Partner	Opponents	Score
Loss	0–1	Sep 2023	ITF Hilton Head, United States	W15	Clay	(Peru) Lucciana Pérez	(Chinese Taipei) Hsu Chieh-yu (United States) Mia Yamakita	2–6, 5–7
Loss	0–2	Mar 2024	ITF Campinas, Brazil	W15	Clay	(Brazil) Júlia Konishi Camargo Silva	(United States) Jaeda Daniel (Russia) Maria Kononova	0–6, 7–6^{(3)}, [4–10]
Loss	0–3	Jun 2025	ITF Caserta, Italy	W75	Clay	(Spain) Ariana Geerlings	(Chinese Taipei) Cho I-hsuan (Chinese Taipei) Cho Yi-tsen	3–6, 6–7^{(5)}
Loss	0–4	Jul 2025	Championnats de Granby, Canada	W75	Hard	(Japan) Saki Imamura	(Canada) Alexandra Vagramov (Czech Republic) Darja Viďmanová	6–7^{(5)}, 3–6
Win	1–4	Oct 2025	Rancho Santa Fe Open, US	W50	Hard	(Japan) Himeno Sakatsume	(United States) Fiona Crawley (United States) Jaeda Daniel	7–6^{(5)}, 3–6, [10–5]

== Junior finals ==
=== Grand Slam tournaments ===
==== Singles: 2 (1 title, 1 runner-up) ====
Result	Year	Tournament	Surface	Opponent	Score
Loss	2024	US Open	Hard	(United Kingdom) Mika Stojsavljevic	4–6, 4–6
Win	2025	Australian Open	Hard	(United States) Kristina Penickova	6–0, 6–1
