= 2025 Australian Open – Wheelchair men's doubles =

Wheelchair men's doubles
- 2025 Australian Open

Final
- Champions: (United Kingdom) Alfie Hewett (United Kingdom) Gordon Reid
- Runners-up: (Spain) Daniel Caverzaschi (France) Stéphane Houdet
- Score: 6–2, 6–4

Details
- Draw: 8
- Seeds: 2

Events
Singles	men	women		boys	girls
Doubles	men	women	mixed	boys	girls
WC Singles	men	women	quad	boys	girls
WC Doubles	men	women	quad	boys	girls
- Australian Open

Five-time defending champions Alfie Hewett and Gordon Reid defeated Daniel Caverzaschi and Stéphane Houdet in the final, 6–2, 6–4 to win the men's doubles wheelchair tennis title at the 2025 Australian Open.

== Seeds ==
1. (United Kingdom) Alfie Hewett / (United Kingdom) Gordon Reid (champions)
2. (Netherlands) Tom Egberink / (Japan) Tokito Oda (semifinals)

== Draw ==
Key

- Q = Qualifier
- WC = Wild card
- LL = Lucky loser
- Alt = Alternate
- ITF = ITF entry
- PR = Protected ranking
- SR = Special ranking
- SE = Special exempt
- JE = Junior exempt
- JR = Junior Accelerator Programme entrant
- CO = College Accelerator Programme entrant
- NG = Next Gen Accelerator Program entrant
- w/o = Walkover
- r = Retired
- d = Defaulted

=== Draw ===
Quarterfinals
1	(United Kingdom) Alfie Hewett (United Kingdom) Gordon Reid	6	6
(Japan) Daisuke Arai (Japan) Takuya Miki	2	0
(United States) Casey Ratzlaff (Japan) Takashi Sanada	4	4
(Spain) Martín de la Puente (Netherlands) Ruben Spaargaren	6	6
(Argentina) Gustavo Fernández (Belgium) Joachim Gérard	4	5
(Spain) Daniel Caverzaschi (France) Stéphane Houdet	6	7
(China) Ji Zhenxu (Australia) Anderson Parker	1	3
2	(Netherlands) Tom Egberink (Japan) Tokito Oda	6	6

Semifinals
1	(United Kingdom) Alfie Hewett (United Kingdom) Gordon Reid	6	6
(Spain) Martín de la Puente (Netherlands) Ruben Spaargaren	4	4
(Spain) Daniel Caverzaschi (France) Stéphane Houdet	6	5	[12]
2	(Netherlands) Tom Egberink (Japan) Tokito Oda	2	7	[10]

Final
1	(United Kingdom) Alfie Hewett (United Kingdom) Gordon Reid	6	6
(Spain) Daniel Caverzaschi (France) Stéphane Houdet	2	4
