= 2025 Australian Open – Girls' singles =

Girls' singles
- 2025 Australian Open

Final
- Champion: (Japan) Wakana Sonobe
- Runner-up: (United States) Kristina Penickova
- Score: 6–0, 6–1

Details
- Draw: 64
- Seeds: 16

Events
Singles	men	women		boys	girls
Doubles	men	women	mixed	boys	girls
WC Singles	men	women	quad	boys	girls
WC Doubles	men	women	quad	boys	girls
- Australian Open

Wakana Sonobe won the girls' singles title at the 2025 Australian Open, defeating Kristina Penickova in the final, 6–0, 6–1.

Renáta Jamrichová was the reigning champion, but she decided to end her junior career at the 2024 Wimbledon Championships. She received a wild card into the women's singles qualifying, where she lost to Carole Monnet in the second round.

== Seeds ==
1. (Australia) Emerson Jones (semifinals)
2. (United Kingdom) Mika Stojsavljevic (first round)
3. (Belgium) Jeline Vandromme (quarterfinals)
4. (Japan) Wakana Sonobe (champion)
5. (Serbia) Teodora Kostović (second round, retired)
6. (United States) Kristina Penickova (final)
7. (Czech Republic) Tereza Krejčová (second round)
8. (Bulgaria) Elizara Yaneva (second round)
9. (United Kingdom) Mingge Xu (third round)
10. (Bulgaria) Rositsa Dencheva (first round)
11. (Czech Republic) Jana Kovačková (third round)
12. (Czech Republic) Alena Kovačková (third round)
13. (Czech Republic) Vendula Valdmannová (first round)
14. (United Kingdom) Hannah Klugman (third round)
15. (Israel) Mika Buchnik (first round)
16. (Germany) Julia Stusek (third round)

Click on the seed number of a player to go to their draw section.

== Draw ==
Key

- Q = Qualifier
- WC = Wild card
- LL = Lucky loser
- Alt = Alternate
- ITF = ITF entry
- PR = Protected ranking
- SR = Special ranking
- SE = Special exempt
- JE = Junior exempt
- JR = Junior Accelerator Programme entrant
- CO = College Accelerator Programme entrant
- NG = Next Gen Accelerator Program entrant
- w/o = Walkover
- r = Retired
- d = Defaulted

=== Finals ===
Quarterfinals
1	(Australia) Emerson Jones	4	6	6
(Austria) Lilli Tagger	6	2	2
4	(Japan) Wakana Sonobe	6	6
WC	(Australia) Tahlia Kokkinis	2	4
(Slovakia) Mia Pohánková	6	6
3	(Belgium) Jeline Vandromme	2	1
6	(United States) Kristina Penickova	7	6
Q	(Japan) Shiho Tsujioka	5	3

Semifinals
1	(Australia) Emerson Jones	3	4
4	(Japan) Wakana Sonobe	6	6
(Slovakia) Mia Pohánková	4	6	5
6	(United States) Kristina Penickova	6	4	7

Final
4	(Japan) Wakana Sonobe	6	6
6	(United States) Kristina Penickova	0	1

=== Top half ===
==== Section 1 ====
First round
1	(Australia) Emerson Jones	6	6
Q	Anastasia Lizunova	3	3
(United States) Thea Frodin	6	7^{7}
SE	(Brazil) Nauhany Vitória Leme da Silva	3	6^{1}
(France) Eleejah Inisan	2	4
Q	Yuliya Perapekhina	6	6
(Sweden) Lea Nilsson	7	7
13	(Czech Republic) Vendula Valdmannová	5	5
9	(United Kingdom) Mingge Xu	6	6
WC	(Australia) Ava Beck	1	2
Q	(China) Qu Yihan	6	1	4
(Romania) Diana-Ioana Simionescu	2	6	6
WC	(Japan) Nanami Gotō	0	2
(Austria) Lilli Tagger	6	6
(Czech Republic) Sarah Melany Fajmonová	4	4
5	(Serbia) Teodora Kostović	6	6

Second round
1	(Australia) E Jones	6^{3}	6	6
(United States) T Frodin	7^{7}	2	3
Q	Y Perapekhina	7^{7}	6
(Sweden) L Nilsson	6^{4}	3
9	(United Kingdom) M Xu	7^{7}	6
(Romania) D-I Simionescu	6^{3}	2
(Austria) L Tagger	4	6	4
5	(Serbia) T Kostović	6	3	2^{r}

Third round
1	(Australia) E Jones	6	6
Q	Y Perapekhina	3	2
9	(United Kingdom) M Xu	3	4
(Austria) L Tagger	6	6

Quarterfinals
1	(Australia) E Jones	4	6	6
(Austria) L Tagger	6	2	2

==== Section 2 ====
First round
4	(Japan) Wakana Sonobe	6	4	7^{10}
Q	(China) Zhang Ruien	3	6	6^{8}
(Turkey) Deniz Dilek	6	6
WC	(Australia) Emilie Chen	3	4
(United States) Shannon Lam	5	2
(France) Daphnée Mpetshi Perricard	7	6
WC	(Australia) Tori Russell	2	2
16	(Germany) Julia Stusek	6	6
10	(Bulgaria) Rositsa Dencheva	3	2
WC	(Australia) Tahlia Kokkinis	6	6
(United States) Aspen Schuman	3	2
(Japan) Kanon Sawashiro	6	6
Q	(United Kingdom) Brooke Black	4	6	6
(Lithuania) Laima Vladson	6	3	1
(Serbia) Luna Vujović	3	2
7	(Czech Republic) Tereza Krejčová	6	6

Second round
4	(Japan) W Sonobe	6	6
(Turkey) D Dilek	2	2
(France) D Mpetshi Perricard	2	6	5
16	(Germany) J Stusek	6	4	7
WC	(Australia) T Kokkinis	6	3	6
(Japan) K Sawashiro	2	6	4
Q	(United Kingdom) B Black	6	3	6
7	(Czech Republic) T Krejčová	4	6	4

Third round
4	(Japan) W Sonobe	6	6
16	(Germany) J Stusek	4	3
WC	(Australia) T Kokkinis	5	6	6
Q	(United Kingdom) B Black	7	1	3

Quarterfinals
4	(Japan) W Sonobe	6	6
WC	(Australia) T Kokkinis	2	4

=== Bottom half ===
==== Section 3 ====
First round
8	(Bulgaria) Elizara Yaneva	6	6
Q	(France) Margot Phanthala	1	3
(Slovakia) Mia Pohánková	2	7^{7}	6
(United States) Annika Penickova	6	6^{3}	2
(Japan) Reina Gotō	6	5	6
Q	(China) Wei Zhangqian	3	7	4
WC	(Australia) Sarah Mildren	6	5	2
11	(Czech Republic) Jana Kovačková	3	7	6
14	(United Kingdom) Hannah Klugman	6	6
(Sweden) Nellie Taraba Wallberg	1	1
(Australia) Alana Subasic	6^{5}	2
(Romania) Maia Ilinca Burcescu	7^{7}	6
(United States) Claire An	3	4
(Germany) Sonja Zhenikhova	6	6
WC	(Australia) Koharu Nishikawa	4	6	2
3	(Belgium) Jeline Vandromme	6	3	6

Second round
8	(Bulgaria) E Yaneva	7^{7}	5	4
(Slovakia) M Pohánková	6^{4}	7	6
(Japan) R Gotō	6	0	4
11	(Czech Republic) J Kovačková	1	6	6
14	(United Kingdom) H Klugman	6	5	6
(Romania) MI Burcescu	3	7	2
(Germany) S Zhenikhova	1	5
3	(Belgium) J Vandromme	6	7

Third round
(Slovakia) M Pohánková	5	6	6
11	(Czech Republic) J Kovačková	7	3	1
14	(United Kingdom) H Klugman	6	3	2
3	(Belgium) J Vandromme	4	6	6

Quarterfinals
(Slovakia) M Pohánková	6	6
3	(Belgium) J Vandromme	2	1

==== Section 4 ====
First round
6	(United States) Kristina Penickova	3	6	7^{10}
(Thailand) Kamonwan Yodpetch	6	4	6^{5}
(China) Wang Yuhan	7	7^{7}
Q	(Latvia) Beatrise Zeltiņa	5	6^{4}
(France) Ksenia Efremova	2	6	3
(Australia) Renee Alame	6	0	6
(Germany) Eva Bennemann	3	6	3
12	(Czech Republic) Alena Kovačková	6	3	6
15	(Israel) Mika Buchnik	3	4
(Brazil) Victoria Luiza Barros	6	6
(Serbia) Petra Konjikušić	3	7^{7}	7^{10}
(United States) Maya Iyengar	6	6^{2}	6^{7}
WC	(Australia) Jizelle Sibai	3	2
Q	(Japan) Shiho Tsujioka	6	6
SE	(Romania) Anamaria Federica Oana	2	6	6
2	(United Kingdom) Mika Stojsavljevic	6	3	2

Second round
6	(United States) K Penickova	5	7	7^{10}
(China) Y Wang	7	5	6^{8}
(Australia) R Alame	4	4
12	(Czech Republic) A Kovačková	6	6
(Brazil) VL Barros	4	6	6
(Serbia) P Konjikušić	6	3	4
Q	(Japan) S Tsujioka	6	7^{7}
SE	(Romania) AF Oana	4	6^{5}

Third round
6	(United States) K Penickova	2	6	6
12	(Czech Republic) A Kovačková	6	1	1
(Brazil) VL Barros	6^{8}	0
Q	(Japan) S Tsujioka	7^{10}	6

Quarterfinals
6	(United States) K Penickova	7	6
Q	(Japan) S Tsujioka	5	3

== Qualifying ==
=== Seeds ===
1. (Turkey) Ada Kümrü (qualifying competition)
2. (France) Margot Phanthala (qualified)
3. (Germany) Victoria Pohle (qualifying competition)
4. (United Kingdom) Flora Johnson (qualifying competition)
5. (South Korea) Suha Lee (first round)
6. (China) Li Yuyao (qualifying competition)
7. (Japan) Shiho Tsujioka (qualified)
8. Yuliya Perapekhina (qualified)
9. Anastasia Lizunova (qualified)
10. (United Kingdom) Allegra Korpanec Davies (first round)
11. (China) Shao Yushan (qualifying competition)
12. (United Kingdom) Brooke Black (qualified)
13. (France) Dune Vaissaud (first round)
14. (China) Qu Yihan (qualified)
15. (Turkey) Irem Kurt (qualifying competition)
16. (Hungary) Melinda Bíró (qualifying competition)

=== Qualifiers ===
1. (China) Zhang Ruien
2. (France) Margot Phanthala
3. (United Kingdom) Brooke Black
4. (China) Wei Zhang-qian
5. (China) Qu Yihan
6. Anastasia Lizunova
7. (Japan) Shiho Tsujioka
8. Yuliya Perapekhina

=== Draw ===
==== First qualifier ====
First round
1	(Turkey) Ada Kümrü	6	6
(Australia) Gabrielle Villegas	3	3
(China) Zhang Ruien	6	6
10	(United Kingdom) Allegra Korpanec Davies	0	3

Qualifying competition
1	(Turkey) Ada Kümrü	3	4
(China) Zhang Ruien	6	6

==== Second qualifier ====
First round
2	(France) Margot Phanthala	6	6
WC	(Australia) Audrey Aulia	2	2
(Japan) Aoi Watanabe	2	2
15	(Turkey) Irem Kurt	6	6

Qualifying competition
2	(France) Margot Phanthala	6	6
15	(Turkey) Irem Kurt	1	2

==== Third qualifier ====
First round
3	(Germany) Victoria Pohle	7	1
(Australia) Georgia Campbell	5	2^{r}
(Australia) Sara Nikolic	3	3
12	(United Kingdom) Brooke Black	6	6

Qualifying competition
3	(Germany) Victoria Pohle	4	3
12	(United Kingdom) Brooke Black	6	6

==== Fourth qualifier ====
First round
4	(United Kingdom) Flora Johnson	6	6
(Australia) Giselle Isabella Guillen	3	4
(China) Wei Zhang-qian	6^{5}	6	6
13	(France) Dune Vaissaud	7^{7}	4	2

Qualifying competition
4	(United Kingdom) Flora Johnson	6^{5}	4
(China) Wei Zhang-qian	7^{7}	6

==== Fifth qualifier ====
First round
5	(South Korea) Suha Lee	7^{7}	2	4
(Australia) Kimiko Cooper	6^{1}	6	6
WC	(Australia) Scarlett Dattoli	1	2
14	(China) Qu Yihan	6	6

Qualifying competition
(Australia) Kimiko Cooper	0	3
14	(China) Qu Yihan	6	6

==== Sixth qualifier ====
First round
6	(China) Li Yuyao	6	3	6
(Japan) Rioko Umekuni	1	6	2
(Australia) Charlotte Vanstone McGrath	2	1
9	Anastasia Lizunova	6	6

Qualifying competition
6	(China) Li Yuyao	5	4
9	Anastasia Lizunova	7	6

==== Seventh qualifier ====
First round
7	(Japan) Shiho Tsujioka	6	6
Alt	(Australia) Savannah James	2	1
(Australia) Rianna Alame	2	3
11	(China) Shao Yushan	6	6

Qualifying competition
7	(Japan) Shiho Tsujioka	6	6
11	(China) Shao Yushan	2	1

==== Eighth qualifier ====
First round
8	Yuliya Perapekhina	6	6
(Ukraine) Mariia Drobysheva	2	1
(Australia) Ellen Hirschi	3	3
16	(Hungary) Melinda Bíró	6	6

Qualifying competition
8	Yuliya Perapekhina	4	0
16	(Hungary) Melinda Bíró	6	6
