= 2025 Australian Open – Wheelchair quad doubles =

Wheelchair quad doubles
- 2025 Australian Open

Final
- Champions: (United Kingdom) Andy Lapthorne (Netherlands) Sam Schröder
- Runners-up: (Israel) Guy Sasson (Netherlands) Niels Vink
- Score: 6–1, 6–4

Details
- Draw: 8
- Seeds: 2

Events
Singles	men	women		boys	girls
Doubles	men	women	mixed	boys	girls
WC Singles	men	women	quad	boys	girls
WC Doubles	men	women	quad	boys	girls
- Australian Open

Defending champion Andy Lapthorne and his partner Sam Schröder defeated Guy Sasson and Niels Vink in the final, 6–1, 6–4 to win the quad doubles wheelchair tennis title at the 2025 Australian Open.

Lapthorne and David Wagner were the reigning champions, but chose not to participate together this year. Wagner partnered Diego Pérez, but lost in the quarterfinals to Heath Davidson and Robert Shaw.

== Seeds ==
1. (Israel) Guy Sasson / (Netherlands) Niels Vink (final)
2. (United Kingdom) Andy Lapthorne / (Netherlands) Sam Schröder (champions)

== Draw ==
Key

- Q = Qualifier
- WC = Wild card
- LL = Lucky loser
- Alt = Alternate
- ITF = ITF entry
- PR = Protected ranking
- SR = Special ranking
- SE = Special exempt
- JE = Junior exempt
- JR = Junior Accelerator Programme entrant
- CO = College Accelerator Programme entrant
- NG = Next Gen Accelerator Program entrant
- w/o = Walkover
- r = Retired
- d = Defaulted

=== Draw ===
Quarterfinals
1	(Israel) Guy Sasson (Netherlands) Niels Vink	6	6
(Turkey) Ahmet Kaplan (South Africa) Donald Ramphadi	0	3
(Brazil) Leandro Pena (Brazil) Ymanitu Silva	3	6^{9}
(Australia) Finn Broadbent (Australia) Jin Woodman	6	7^{11}
(Chile) Diego Pérez (United States) David Wagner	0	2
(Australia) Heath Davidson (Canada) Robert Shaw	6	6
(Chile) Francisco Cayulef (Argentina) Gonzalo Enrique Lazarte	7	5	[10]
2	(United Kingdom) Andy Lapthorne (Netherlands) Sam Schröder	5	7	[12]

Semifinals
1	(Israel) Guy Sasson (Netherlands) Niels Vink	6	6
(Australia) Finn Broadbent (Australia) Jin Woodman	0	1
(Australia) Heath Davidson (Canada) Robert Shaw	1	2
2	(United Kingdom) Andy Lapthorne (Netherlands) Sam Schröder	6	6

Final
1	(Israel) Guy Sasson (Netherlands) Niels Vink	1	4
2	(United Kingdom) Andy Lapthorne (Netherlands) Sam Schröder	6	6
