= 2025 Australian Open – Wheelchair quad singles =

Wheelchair quad singles
- 2025 Australian Open

Final
- Champion: (Netherlands) Sam Schröder
- Runner-up: (Netherlands) Niels Vink
- Score: 7–6^{(9–7)}, 7–5

Details
- Draw: 16
- Seeds: 4

Events
Singles	men	women		boys	girls
Doubles	men	women	mixed	boys	girls
WC Singles	men	women	quad	boys	girls
WC Doubles	men	women	quad	boys	girls
- Australian Open

Three-time defending champion Sam Schröder defeated Niels Vink in the final, 7–6^{(9–7)}, 7–5 to win the quad singles wheelchair tennis title at the 2025 Australian Open. It was his fourth Australian Open singles title and seventh major singles title overall.

== Seeds ==
1. (Netherlands) Sam Schröder (champion)
2. (Netherlands) Niels Vink (final)
3. (Israel) Guy Sasson (semifinals)
4. (Turkey) Ahmet Kaplan (semifinals)

== Draw ==
Key

- Q = Qualifier
- WC = Wild card
- LL = Lucky loser
- Alt = Alternate
- ITF = ITF entry
- PR = Protected ranking
- SR = Special ranking
- SE = Special exempt
- JE = Junior exempt
- JR = Junior Accelerator Programme entrant
- CO = College Accelerator Programme entrant
- NG = Next Gen Accelerator Program entrant
- w/o = Walkover
- r = Retired
- d = Defaulted

=== Draw ===
First round
1	(Netherlands) Sam Schröder	6	6
(Brazil) Ymanitu Silva	0	1
Q	(Brazil) Leandro Pena	6^{5}	3
(Chile) Francisco Cayulef	7^{7}	6
4	(Turkey) Ahmet Kaplan	6	6
WC	(Australia) Finn Broadbent	1	1
(Australia) Heath Davidson	6^{2}	6	3
WC	(Australia) Jin Woodman	7^{7}	2	6
(South Africa) Donald Ramphadi	6	7^{7}
(United States) David Wagner	0	6^{4}
(Chile) Diego Pérez	0	0
3	(Israel) Guy Sasson	6	6
(United Kingdom) Andy Lapthorne	6	6
Q	(Argentina) Gonzalo Enrique Lazarte	3	3
(Canada) Robert Shaw	0	0
2	(Netherlands) Niels Vink	6	6

Quarterfinals
1	(Netherlands) S Schröder	6	6
(Chile) F Cayulef	1	1
4	(Turkey) A Kaplan	6	6
WC	(Australia) J Woodman	2	4
(South Africa) D Ramphadi	0	0
3	(Israel) G Sasson	6	6
(United Kingdom) A Lapthorne	2	0
2	(Netherlands) N Vink	6	6

Semifinals
1	(Netherlands) S Schröder	7	6
4	(Turkey) A Kaplan	5	1
3	(Israel) G Sasson	6^{6}	0
2	(Netherlands) N Vink	7^{8}	6

Final
1	(Netherlands) S Schröder	7^{9}	7
2	(Netherlands) N Vink	6^{7}	5

== Qualifying ==
=== Seeds ===
1. (Brazil) Leandro Pena (qualified)
2. (Turkey) Ali Ataman (qualifying competition)

=== Qualifiers ===
1. (Brazil) Leandro Pena
2. (Argentina) Gonzalo Enrique Lazarte

=== Qualifying draw ===
Qualifying competition
1	(Brazil) Leandro Pena	6	6
WC	(United Kingdom) Gregory Slade	2	4
Qualifying competition
(Argentina) Gonzalo Enrique Lazarte	2	6	6
2	(Turkey) Ali Ataman	6	4	0
