= Maxwell Exsted =

American tennis player (born 2007)

- Country (sports): United States
- Born: March 12, 2007 (age 19) Savage, Minnesota, US
- Height: 5 ft 9 in (1.75 m)
- Plays: Right-handed (two-handed backhand)
- Prize money: US $39,405

Singles
- Career record: 0–0 (at ATP Tour level, Grand Slam level, and in Davis Cup)
- Career titles: 0
- Highest ranking: No. 863 (August 31, 2026)
- Current ranking: No. 863 (August 31, 2026)

Doubles
- Career record: 1–1 (at ATP Tour level, Grand Slam level, and in Davis Cup)
- Career titles: 0
- Highest ranking: No. 282 (August 24, 2026)
- Current ranking: No. 284 (August 31, 2026)

Grand Slam doubles results
- US Open: 2R (2025)
- Last updated on: August 31, 2026.

Maxwell Exsted (born March 12, 2007) is an American professional tennis player. He has a career-high ATP singles ranking of No. 863 achieved on August 31, 2026 and a best doubles ranking of No. 282 achieved on August 24, 2026.

Exsted won the boys' doubles titles at the 2024 and 2025 editions of the Australian Open.

== Early and personal life ==
From Savage, Minnesota, Exsted started taking tennis lessons in his early childhood. He won his first junior tennis tournament at the age of four.

Exsted relocated with his parents, Christian and Jodi, to Miramar, Florida to train with private coach Courtney Scott at the USTA National Campus in Orlando. He has two siblings, Alex and Isabelle, who both played collegiate tennis.

== Junior career ==
With Darwin Blanch and Jagger Leach, Exsted was part of the American team which finished third at the 2023 Junior Davis Cup.

Exsted also had good results on the ITF junior circuit, maintaining a 120–68 singles win-loss record. In January 2024, he won the boys' doubles category at the Australian Open, with compatriot Cooper Woestendick. The pair also won the J300 Traralgon International doubles competition together two weeks earlier.

The following season, Exsted earned another major jr. trophy in doubles, and successfully defended his title in Melbourne, this time alongside Czech Jan Kumstát.

He reached an ITF junior combined ranking of No. 12 on January 20, 2025.

== Professional career ==
In August 2025, Exsted received a wildcard to the men's doubles event at the 2025 US Open, with compatriot and friend Cooper Woestendick. The American pair caused a shock upset win against experienced players David Goffin and Alexandre Muller in the first round. They were defeated in the second round by sixth seeds and eventual runners-up Joe Salisbury and Neal Skupski.

== ITF World Tennis Tour finals ==
=== Doubles: 5 (4 titles, 1 runner-up) ===
| Legend ITF WTT (4–1) | Finals by surface Hard (2–0) Clay (2–1) |

| Result | W–L | Date | Tournament | Tier | Surface | Partner | Opponents | Score |
|---|---|---|---|---|---|---|---|---|
| Win | 1–0 | Sep 2025 | M15 Kayseri, Turkey | WTT | Hard | (Spain) Iván Marrero Curbelo | Semen Pankin (France) Constantin Bittoun Kouzmine | 6–2, 4–6, [10–7] |
| Win | 2–0 | Oct 2025 | M15 Pontevedra, Spain | WTT | Hard | (United States) Enzo Wallart | (Switzerland) Adrien Burdet (United Kingdom) William Nolan | 7–5, 7–5 |
| Win | 3–0 | Nov 2025 | M15 Orlando, US | WTT | Clay | (United Kingdom) William Nolan | (United States) Ryan Colby (United States) Noah Zamora | 6–4, 7–6^{(7–3)} |
| Win | 4–0 | Nov 2025 | M15 Orlando, US (2) | WTT | Clay | (United States) Felix Corwin | (United States) Ryan Cozad (United States) Gavin Goode | 6–3, 6–1 |
| Loss | 4–1 | Feb 2026 | M15 Naples, US | WTT | Clay | (Colombia) Miguel Tobón | (United Kingdom) Adam Jones (United Kingdom) Toby Martin | 4–6, 2–6 |

== Junior Grand Slam finals ==
=== Doubles: 2 (2 titles) ===
| Result | Year | Tournament | Surface | Partner | Opponents | Score |
|---|---|---|---|---|---|---|
| Win | 2024 | Australian Open | Hard | (United States) Cooper Woestendick | (Czech Republic) Petr Brunclík (United Kingdom) Viktor Frydrych | 6–3, 7–5 |
| Win | 2025 | Australian Open | Hard | (Czech Republic) Jan Kumstát | (Serbia) Ognjen Milić; Egor Pleshivtsev | 7–6, 6–3 |
