= 2025 Australian Open – Girls' doubles =

Girls' doubles
- 2025 Australian Open

Final
- Champions: (United States) Annika Penickova (United States) Kristina Penickova
- Runners-up: (Australia) Emerson Jones (United Kingdom) Hannah Klugman
- Score: 6–4, 6–2

Details
- Draw: 32
- Seeds: 8

Events
| Singles | men | women | | boys | girls |
| Doubles | men | women | mixed | boys | girls |
| WC Singles | men | women | quad | boys | girls |
| WC Doubles | men | women | quad | boys | girls |
- Australian Open

Annika and Kristina Penickova won the title, defeating Emerson Jones and Hannah Klugman in the final, 6–4, 6–2.

Tyra Caterina Grant and Iva Jovic were the reigning champions, but they chose not to participate this year.

== Seeds ==
1. (Japan) Wakana Sonobe / (United Kingdom) Mika Stojsavljevic (quarterfinals)
2. (Australia) Emerson Jones / (United Kingdom) Hannah Klugman (final)
3. (Bulgaria) Rositsa Dencheva / (Bulgaria) Elizara Yaneva (quarterfinals)
4. (Czech Republic) Tereza Krejčová / (Czech Republic) Vendula Valdmannová (semifinals)
5. (Czech Republic) Alena Kovačková / (Czech Republic) Jana Kovačková (semifinals)
6. (United States) Annika Penickova / (United States) Kristina Penickova (champions)
7. (Brazil) Victoria Luiza Barros / (Serbia) Teodora Kostović (first round)
8. (Germany) Julia Stusek / (Serbia) Luna Vujović (quarterfinals)

== Draw ==
Key

- Q = Qualifier
- WC = Wild card
- LL = Lucky loser
- Alt = Alternate
- ITF = ITF entry
- PR = Protected ranking
- SR = Special ranking
- SE = Special exempt
- JE = Junior exempt
- JR = Junior Accelerator Programme entrant
- CO = College Accelerator Programme entrant
- NG = Next Gen Accelerator Program entrant
- w/o = Walkover
- r = Retired
- d = Defaulted

=== Finals ===
Semifinals
5 | (Czech Republic) Alena Kovačková (Czech Republic) Jana Kovačková | 7 | 1 | [9]
6 | (United States) Annika Penickova (United States) Kristina Penickova | 5 | 6 | [11]
4 | (Czech Republic) Tereza Krejčová (Czech Republic) Vendula Valdmannová | 6^{3} | 3
2 | (Australia) Emerson Jones (United Kingdom) Hannah Klugman | 7^{7} | 6

Final
6 | (United States) Annika Penickova (United States) Kristina Penickova | 6 | 6
2 | (Australia) Emerson Jones (United Kingdom) Hannah Klugman | 4 | 2

=== Top half ===
First round
1 | (Japan) Wakana Sonobe (United Kingdom) Mika Stojsavljevic | 6 | 6
(France) Ksenia Efremova (Sweden) Lea Nilsson | 1 | 2
(United States) Maya Iyengar; Yuliya Perapekhina | 7 | 7
WC | (Australia) Sarah Mildren (Australia) Jizelle Sibai | 5 | 5
(China) Qu Yihan (China) Wei Zhangqian | 6 | 4 | [10]
(France) Eleejah Inisan (France) Daphnée Mpetshi Perricard | 0 | 6 | 4
(Austria) Lilli Tagger (Lithuania) Laima Vladson | 6 | 5 | [11]
5 | (Czech Republic) Alena Kovačková (Czech Republic) Jana Kovačková | 3 | 7 | [13]
3 | (Bulgaria) Rositsa Dencheva (Bulgaria) Elizara Yaneva | 3 | 6 | [11]
WC | (Australia) Ava Beck (Australia) Koharu Ishikawa | 6 | 2 | [9]
(Romania) Maia Ilinca Burcescu (Romania) Anamaria Federica Oana | 0 | 6 | [10]
(United States) Thea Frodin (Romania) Diana-Ioana Simionescu | 6 | 4 | [6]
(Czech Republic) Sarah Melany Fajmonová (Australia) Alana Subasic | 7^{7} | 6
(Israel) Mika Buchnik (United States) Aspen Schuman | 6^{2} | 1
(China) Li Yuyao; Anastasia Lizunova | 1 | 1
6 | (United States) Annika Penickova (United States) Kristina Penickova | 6 | 6

Second round
1 | (Japan) W Sonobe (United Kingdom) M Stojsavljevic | 6 | 6
(United States) M Iyengar; Y Perapekhina | 2 | 2
(China) Y Qu (China) Z Wei | 2 | 2
5 | (Czech Republic) A Kovačková (Czech Republic) J Kovačková | 6 | 6
3 | (Bulgaria) R Dencheva (Bulgaria) E Yaneva | 6 | 6
(Romania) MI Burcescu (Romania) AF Oana | 2 | 1
(Czech Republic) SM Fajmonová (Australia) A Subasic | 5 | 3
6 | (United States) A Penickova (United States) K Penickova | 7 | 6

Quarterfinals
1 | (Japan) W Sonobe (United Kingdom) M Stojsavljevic | 6 | 0 | [7]
5 | (Czech Republic) A Kovačková (Czech Republic) J Kovačková | 1 | 6 | [10]
3 | (Bulgaria) R Dencheva (Bulgaria) E Yaneva | 3 | 6^{3} | 0
6 | (United States) A Penickova (United States) K Penickova | 6 | 7^{7}

Semifinals
5 | (Czech Republic) A Kovačková (Czech Republic) J Kovačková | 7 | 1 | [9]
6 | (United States) A Penickova (United States) K Penickova | 5 | 6 | [11]

=== Bottom half ===
First round
8 | (Germany) Julia Stusek (Serbia) Luna Vujović | 6 | 6
(Serbia) Petra Konjikušić (Japan) Kanon Sawashiro | 0 | 1
(Australia) Renee Alame (Australia) Rianna Alame | 4 | 6 | [8]
(France) Margot Phanthala (China) Zhang Ruien | 6 | 3 | [10]
(Turkey) Ada Kumru (Brazil) Nauhany Vitória Leme da Silva | 5 | 7^{7} | [4]
(United States) Claire An (United States) Shannon Lam | 7 | 6^{5} | [10]
(Germany) Eva Bennemann (Japan) Reina Goto | 3 | 4
4 | (Czech Republic) Tereza Krejčová (Czech Republic) Vendula Valdmannová | 6 | 6
7 | (Brazil) Victoria Luiza Barros (Serbia) Teodora Kostović | 4 | 4
(United Kingdom) Brooke Black (United Kingdom) Mingge Xu | 6 | 6
(China) Wang Yihan (Thailand) Kamonwan Yodpetch | 6 | 3 | [10]
WC | (Australia) Tahlia Kokkinis (Australia) Sara Nikolic | 1 | 6 | 5
(Slovakia) Mia Pohánková (Belgium) Jeline Vandromme | 6 | 4 | [10]
(Sweden) Nellie Taraba Wallberg (Germany) Sonja Zhenikhova | 4 | 6 | 5
(Turkey) Deniz Dilek (Latvia) Beatrise Zeltiņa | 6^{6} | 3
2 | (Australia) Emerson Jones (United Kingdom) Hannah Klugman | 7^{8} | 6

Second round
8 | (Germany) J Stusek (Serbia) L Vujović | 3 | 6 | [10]
(France) M Phanthala (China) R Zhang | 6 | 4 | [8]
(United States) C An (United States) S Lam | 5 | 7^{9} | [3]
4 | (Czech Republic) T Krejčová (Czech Republic) V Valdmannová | 7 | 6^{7} | [10]
(United Kingdom) B Black (United Kingdom) M Xu | 6 | 3 | [5]
(China) Y Wang (Thailand) K Yodpetch | 2 | 6 | [10]
(Slovakia) M Pohánková (Belgium) J Vandromme | 6 | 4 | [8]
2 | (Australia) E Jones (United Kingdom) H Klugman | 2 | 6 | [10]

Quarterfinals
8 | (Germany) J Stusek (Serbia) L Vujović | 0 | 7 | [6]
4 | (Czech Republic) T Krejčová (Czech Republic) V Valdmannová | 6 | 5 | [10]
(China) Y Wang (Thailand) K Yodpetch | 2 | 6 | [7]
2 | (Australia) E Jones (United Kingdom) H Klugman | 6 | 2 | [10]

Semifinals
4 | (Czech Republic) T Krejčová (Czech Republic) V Valdmannová | 6^{3} | 3
2 | (Australia) E Jones (United Kingdom) H Klugman | 7^{7} | 6
