= 2025 Australian Open – Wheelchair women's doubles =

Wheelchair women's doubles
- 2025 Australian Open

Final
- Champions: (China) Li Xiaohui (China) Wang Ziying
- Runners-up: (Japan) Manami Tanaka (China) Zhu Zhenzhen
- Score: 6–2, 6–3

Details
- Draw: 8
- Seeds: 2

Events
Singles	men	women		boys	girls
Doubles	men	women	mixed	boys	girls
WC Singles	men	women	quad
WC Doubles	men	women	quad
← 2024 ·	Australian Open	· 2026 →

Li Xiaohui and Wang Ziying defeated Manami Tanaka and Zhu Zhenzhen in the final, 6–2, 6–3 to win the women's doubles wheelchair tennis title at the 2025 Australian Open.

Diede de Groot and Jiske Griffioen were the reigning champions, but de Groot did not participate this year due to injury. Griffioen partnered Aniek van Koot, but lost in the semifinals to Tanaka and Zhu.

== Seeds ==
1. (Netherlands) Jiske Griffioen / (Netherlands) Aniek van Koot (semifinals)
2. (Japan) Yui Kamiji / (United Kingdom) Lucy Shuker (semifinals)

== Draw ==
=== Key ===
- Q = Qualifier
- WC = Wild card
- LL = Lucky loser
- Alt = Alternate
- ITF = ITF entry
- PR = Protected ranking
- SR = Special ranking
- SE = Special exempt
- JE = Junior exempt
- JR = Junior Accelerator Programme entrant
- CO = College Accelerator Programme entrant
- NG = Next Gen Accelerator Program entrant
- w/o = Walkover
- r = Retired
- d = Defaulted

=== Draw ===
Quarterfinals
1	(Netherlands) Jiske Griffioen (Netherlands) Aniek van Koot	w/o
(Japan) Shiori Funamizu (South Africa) Kgothatso Montjane
(Colombia) Angélica Bernal (Netherlands) Lizzy de Greef	1	5
(Japan) Manami Tanaka (China) Zhu Zhenzhen	6	7
(China) Li Xiaohui (China) Wang Ziying	6	6
(France) Charlotte Fairbank (South Africa) Mariska Venter	1	0
(Chile) Macarena Cabrillana (Japan) Saki Takamuro	1	0
2	(Japan) Yui Kamiji (United Kingdom) Lucy Shuker	6	6

Semifinals
1	(Netherlands) Jiske Griffioen (Netherlands) Aniek van Koot	3	3
(Japan) Manami Tanaka (China) Zhu Zhenzhen	6	6
(China) Li Xiaohui (China) Wang Ziying	7	6
2	(Japan) Yui Kamiji (United Kingdom) Lucy Shuker	5	1

Final
(Japan) Manami Tanaka (China) Zhu Zhenzhen	2	3
(China) Li Xiaohui (China) Wang Ziying	6	6
