= 2025 Australian Open – Mixed doubles =

Mixed doubles
- 2025 Australian Open

Final
- Champions: (Australia) Olivia Gadecki (Australia) John Peers
- Runners-up: (Australia) Kimberly Birrell (Australia) John-Patrick Smith
- Score: 3–6, 6–4, [10–6]

Details
- Draw: 32
- Seeds: 8

Events
Singles	men	women		boys	girls
Doubles	men	women	mixed	boys	girls
WC Singles	men	women	quad
WC Doubles	men	women	quad
- Australian Open

Olivia Gadecki and John Peers defeated Kimberly Birrell and John-Patrick Smith in the final, 3–6, 6–4, [10–6] to win the mixed doubles tennis title at the 2025 Australian Open. It was the first major mixed doubles title for Gadecki, and second for Peers. They saved a match point en route to the title, in the quarterfinals against Zhang Shuai and Rohan Bopanna. Gadecki and Peers became the first all-Australian team to win the title since Jarmila Wolfe and Matthew Ebden in 2013. For the first time in the Open Era, and first time overall since 1967, two all-Australian pairs contested the final.

Hsieh Su-wei and Jan Zieliński were the defending champions, but lost in the second round to Irina Khromacheva and Jackson Withrow.

Desirae Krawczyk was vying to complete the Career Grand Slam in mixed doubles, but she and her partner Neal Skupski lost in the first round to Tímea Babos and Marcelo Arévalo.

== Seeds ==
1. (Italy) Sara Errani / (Italy) Andrea Vavassori (second round)
2. (New Zealand) Erin Routliffe / (New Zealand) Michael Venus (semifinals)
3. (Australia) Ellen Perez / (Germany) Kevin Krawietz (quarterfinals)
4. (United States) Taylor Townsend / (Monaco) Hugo Nys (second round, withdrew)
5. (United States) Desirae Krawczyk / (United Kingdom) Neal Skupski (first round)
6. (Chinese Taipei) Hsieh Su-wei / (Poland) Jan Zieliński (second round)
7. (Netherlands) Demi Schuurs / (Germany) Tim Pütz (second round)
8. (United States) Asia Muhammad / (Argentina) Andrés Molteni (quarterfinals)

== Draw ==
Key

- Q = Qualifier
- WC = Wild card
- LL = Lucky loser
- Alt = Alternate
- ITF = ITF entry
- PR = Protected ranking
- SR = Special ranking
- SE = Special exempt
- JE = Junior exempt
- JR = Junior Accelerator Programme entrant
- CO = College Accelerator Programme entrant
- NG = Next Gen Accelerator Program entrant
- w/o = Walkover
- r = Retired
- d = Defaulted

=== Finals ===
Semifinals
(United Kingdom) Olivia Nicholls (United Kingdom) Henry Patten	6^{2}	2
WC	(Australia) Kimberly Birrell (Australia) John-Patrick Smith	7^{7}	6
WC	(Australia) Olivia Gadecki (Australia) John Peers	6	6
2	(New Zealand) Erin Routliffe (New Zealand) Michael Venus	4	4

Final
WC	(Australia) Kimberly Birrell (Australia) John-Patrick Smith	6	4	[6]
WC	(Australia) Olivia Gadecki (Australia) John Peers	3	6	[10]

=== Top half ===
First round
1	(Italy) S Errani (Italy) A Vavassori	6	6
WC	(Australia) D Aiava (Australia) O Jasika	3	4
(Mexico) G Olmos (Argentina) M González	4	0
(United Kingdom) O Nicholls (United Kingdom) H Patten	6	6
I Khromacheva (United States) J Withrow	6	6
WC	(Australia) D Saville (Australia) L Saville	4	0
WC	(Australia) E Jones (Australia) H Jones	0	5
6	(Chinese Taipei) S-w Hsieh (Poland) J Zieliński	6	7
3	(Australia) E Perez (Germany) K Krawietz	6	6^{3}	[10]
Alt	(Serbia) N Stojanović (Croatia) M Pavić	4	7^{7}	[2]
(United States) B Mattek-Sands (United Kingdom) J Murray	3	6	[9]
WC	(Australia) P Hon (Australia) A Bolt	6	3	[11]
WC	(Australia) K Birrell (Australia) J-P Smith	7^{7}	6
(Chinese Taipei) H-c Chan (Brazil) M Melo	6^{5}	3
WC	(Australia) T Preston (Australia) E Winter	6^{3}	5
7	(Netherlands) D Schuurs (Germany) T Pütz	7^{7}	7

Second round
1	(Italy) S Errani (Italy) A Vavassori	3	4
(United Kingdom) O Nicholls (United Kingdom) H Patten	6	6
I Khromacheva (United States) J Withrow	6	6
6	(Chinese Taipei) S-w Hsieh (Poland) J Zieliński	4	4
3	(Australia) E Perez (Germany) K Krawietz	7	6
WC	(Australia) P Hon (Australia) A Bolt	5	4
WC	(Australia) K Birrell (Australia) J-P Smith	6	5	[10]
7	(Netherlands) D Schuurs (Germany) T Pütz	3	7	[8]

Quarterfinals
(United Kingdom) O Nicholls (United Kingdom) H Patten	6	6
I Khromacheva (United States) J Withrow	2	2
3	(Australia) E Perez (Germany) K Krawietz	2	6	[6]
WC	(Australia) K Birrell (Australia) J-P Smith	6	3	[10]

Semifinals
(United Kingdom) O Nicholls (United Kingdom) H Patten	6^{2}	2
WC	(Australia) K Birrell (Australia) J-P Smith	7^{7}	6

=== Bottom half ===
First round
5	(United States) D Krawczyk (United Kingdom) N Skupski	3	4
(Hungary) T Babos (El Salvador) M Arévalo	6	6
WC	(Australia) O Gadecki (Australia) J Peers	7^{11}	6
(United States) N Melichar-Martinez (United States) R Galloway	6^{9}	1
(France) K Mladenovic (Croatia) I Dodig	4	4
(China) S Zhang (India) R Bopanna	6	6
WC	(Australia) M Inglis (Australia) J Kubler	1	5
4	(United States) T Townsend (Monaco) H Nys	6	7
8	(United States) A Muhammad (Argentina) A Molteni	6	7^{7}
(Czech Republic) K Siniaková (China) Z Zhang	3	6^{2}
(Kazakhstan) A Danilina (Finland) H Heliövaara	6	7^{7}
(Canada) G Dabrowski (Belgium) S Gillé	3	6^{3}
(Spain) C Bucșa (Belgium) J Vliegen	4	6	[8]
A Panova (United Kingdom) L Glasspool	6	1	[10]
(Latvia) J Ostapenko (United Kingdom) J Salisbury	6	3	[1]
2	(New Zealand) E Routliffe (New Zealand) M Venus	3	6	[10]

Second round
(Hungary) T Babos (El Salvador) M Arévalo	4	4
WC	(Australia) O Gadecki (Australia) J Peers	6	6
(China) S Zhang (India) R Bopanna	w/o
4	(United States) T Townsend (Monaco) H Nys
8	(United States) A Muhammad (Argentina) A Molteni	6	4	[11]
(Kazakhstan) A Danilina (Finland) H Heliövaara	1	6	[9]
A Panova (United Kingdom) L Glasspool
2	(New Zealand) E Routliffe (New Zealand) M Venus	w/o

Quarterfinals
WC	(Australia) O Gadecki (Australia) J Peers	2	6	[11]
(China) S Zhang (India) R Bopanna	6	4	[9]
8	(United States) A Muhammad (Argentina) A Molteni	7^{7}	1	[5]
2	(New Zealand) E Routliffe (New Zealand) M Venus	6^{2}	6	[10]

Semifinals
WC	(Australia) O Gadecki (Australia) J Peers	6	6
2	(New Zealand) E Routliffe (New Zealand) M Venus	4	4

== Other entry information ==
=== Wildcards ===
- (Australia) Destanee Aiava / (Australia) Omar Jasika
- (Australia) Kimberly Birrell / (Australia) John-Patrick Smith
- (Australia) Olivia Gadecki / (Australia) John Peers
- (Australia) Priscilla Hon / (Australia) Alex Bolt
- (Australia) Maddison Inglis / (Australia) Jason Kubler
- (Australia) Emerson Jones / (Australia) Hayden Jones
- (Australia) Taylah Preston / (Australia) Edward Winter
- (Australia) Daria Saville / (Australia) Luke Saville

=== Alternates ===
- (Serbia) Nina Stojanović / (Croatia) Mate Pavić

=== Withdrawal ===
- (Ukraine) Lyudmyla Kichenok / (France) Sadio Doumbia → replaced by (Serbia) Nina Stojanović / (Croatia) Mate Pavić
