= 2025 Australian Open – Wheelchair women's singles =

Wheelchair women's singles
- 2025 Australian Open

Final
- Champion: (Japan) Yui Kamiji
- Runner-up: (Netherlands) Aniek van Koot
- Score: 6–2, 6–2

Details
- Draw: 16
- Seeds: 4

Events
Singles	men	women		boys	girls
Doubles	men	women	mixed	boys	girls
WC Singles	men	women	quad
WC Doubles	men	women	quad
← 2024 ·	Australian Open	· 2026 →

Yui Kamiji defeated Aniek van Koot in the final, 6–2, 6–2 to win the women's singles wheelchair tennis title at the 2025 Australian Open. It was her third Australian Open singles title and ninth major singles title overall.

Diede de Groot was the four-time reigning champion, but did not participate this year due to a hip injury. This marked the first major since the 2020 French Open not to be won by de Groot, a 15-major win streak.

== Seeds ==
1. (Japan) Yui Kamiji (champion)
2. (Netherlands) Aniek van Koot (final)
3. (China) Wang Ziying (semifinals)
4. (Netherlands) Jiske Griffioen (quarterfinals)

== Draw ==
=== Key ===
- Q = Qualifier
- WC = Wild card
- LL = Lucky loser
- Alt = Alternate
- ITF = ITF entry
- PR = Protected ranking
- SR = Special ranking
- SE = Special exempt
- JE = Junior exempt
- JR = Junior Accelerator Programme entrant
- CO = College Accelerator Programme entrant
- NG = Next Gen Accelerator Program entrant
- w/o = Walkover
- r = Retired
- d = Defaulted

=== Draw ===
First round
1	(Japan) Yui Kamiji	6	6
WC	(Japan) Shiori Funamizu	0	0
(Netherlands) Lizzy de Greef	7^{7}	7^{7}
(Chile) Macarena Cabrillana	6^{1}	6^{5}
4	(Netherlands) Jiske Griffioen	6	6
Q	(South Africa) Mariska Venter	3	0
(China) Li Xiaohui	6^{5}	6	6
(Japan) Manami Tanaka	7^{7}	2	3
(Japan) Saki Takamuro	3	2
(Colombia) Angélica Bernal	6	6
Q	(France) Charlotte Fairbank	2	2
3	(China) Wang Ziying	6	6
(South Africa) Kgothatso Montjane	6	4	6
WC	(United Kingdom) Lucy Shuker	3	6	4
(China) Zhu Zhenzhen	1	2
2	(Netherlands) Aniek van Koot	6	6

Quarterfinals
1	(Japan) Y Kamiji	6	6
(Netherlands) L de Greef	1	2
4	(Netherlands) J Griffioen	4	1
(China) X Li	6	6
(Colombia) A Bernal	1	6	1
3	(China) Z Wang	6	2	6
(South Africa) K Montjane	0^{r}
2	(Netherlands) A van Koot	3

Semifinals
1	(Japan) Y Kamiji	6	6
(China) X Li	4	1
3	(China) Z Wang	6	6^{4}	1
2	(Netherlands) A van Koot	1	7^{7}	6

Final
1	(Japan) Y Kamiji	6	6
2	(Netherlands) A van Koot	2	2

== Qualifying ==
=== Seeds ===
1. (Netherlands) Jinte Bos (qualifying competition)
2. (United Kingdom) Cornelia Oosthuizen (qualifying competition)

=== Qualifiers ===
1. (South Africa) Mariska Venter
2. (France) Charlotte Fairbank

=== Qualifying draw ===
Qualifying competition
1	(Netherlands) Jinte Bos	4	6	3
WC	(South Africa) Mariska Venter	6	2	6
Qualifying competition
(France) Charlotte Fairbank	6	7^{8}
2	(United Kingdom) Cornelia Oosthuizen	2	6^{6}
