= 2025 US Open – Day-by-day summaries =

Tennis tournament match results

The 2025 US Open August 24 - September 7 2025, described in detail, in the form of day-by-day summaries.

Fan week was from August 18 – August 22. Main draw started on August 24.

== Fan Week – Day 2 (August 19) ==
- Seeds out:
  - Mixed Doubles: (Kazakhstan) Elena Rybakina / (United States) Taylor Fritz [2], (United States) Amanda Anisimova / (Denmark) Holger Rune [4]
- Schedule of Play

Matches on main courts
Matches on Arthur Ashe Stadium
Event	Winner	Loser	Score
Mixed Doubles 1st Round	(United States) Caty McNally [WC] (Italy) Lorenzo Musetti [WC]	(Japan) Naomi Osaka [WC] (France) Gaël Monfils [WC]	5–3, 4–2
Mixed Doubles 1st Round	(Poland) Iga Świątek [3] (Norway) Casper Ruud [3]	(United States) Madison Keys (United States) Frances Tiafoe	4–1, 4–2
Mixed Doubles Quarter-finals	(Poland) Iga Świątek [3] (Norway) Casper Ruud [3]	(United States) Caty McNally [WC] (Italy) Lorenzo Musetti [WC]	4–1, 4–2
Mixed Doubles 1st Round	(United States) Jessica Pegula [1] (United Kingdom) Jack Draper [1]	(United Kingdom) Emma Raducanu [WC] (Spain) Carlos Alcaraz [WC]	4–2, 4–2
Mixed Doubles 1st Round	Mirra Andreeva; Daniil Medvedev	(Serbia) Olga Danilović [WC] (Serbia) Novak Djokovic [WC]	4–2, 5–3
Mixed Doubles Quarter-finals	(United States) Jessica Pegula [1] (United Kingdom) Jack Draper [1]	Mirra Andreeva; Daniil Medvedev	4–1, 4–1
Matches on Louis Armstrong Stadium
Event	Winner	Loser	Score
Mixed Doubles 1st Round	(Italy) Sara Errani [WC] (Italy) Andrea Vavassori [WC]	(Kazakhstan) Elena Rybakina [2] (United States) Taylor Fritz [2]	4–2, 4–2
Mixed Doubles 1st Round	(Czech Republic) Karolína Muchová; Andrey Rublev	(United States) Venus Williams [WC] (United States) Reilly Opelka [WC]	4–2, 5–4^{(7–4)}
Mixed Doubles Quarter-finals	(Italy) Sara Errani [WC] (Italy) Andrea Vavassori [WC]	(Czech Republic) Karolína Muchová; Andrey Rublev	4–1, 5–4^{(7–4)}
Mixed Doubles 1st Round	(United States) Taylor Townsend [WC] (United States) Ben Shelton [WC]	(United States) Amanda Anisimova [4] (Denmark) Holger Rune [4]	4–2, 5–4^{(7–2)}
Mixed Doubles 1st Round	(United States) Danielle Collins [Alt] (United States) Christian Harrison [Alt]	(Switzerland) Belinda Bencic (Germany) Alexander Zverev	4–0, 5–3
Mixed Doubles Quarter-finals	(United States) Danielle Collins [Alt] (United States) Christian Harrison [Alt]	(United States) Taylor Townsend [WC] (United States) Ben Shelton [WC]	4–1, 5–4^{(7–2)}
Matches began at 11am Eastern Daylight Time (EDT)

== Fan Week – Day 3 (August 20) ==
Rain disrupted all outer courts, the remainder of qualifying matches cancelled with few matches played before announced their cancellation. However, Arthur Ashe Stadium went ahead as planned.

- Seeds out:
  - Mixed Doubles: (United States) Jessica Pegula / (United Kingdom) Jack Draper [1], (Poland) Iga Świątek / (Norway) Casper Ruud [3]
- Schedule of Play

Matches on main courts
Matches on Arthur Ashe Stadium
Event	Winner	Loser	Score
Mixed Doubles Semi-finals	(Poland) Iga Świątek [3] (Norway) Casper Ruud [3]	(United States) Jessica Pegula [1] (United Kingdom) Jack Draper [1]	3–5, 5–3, [10–8]
Mixed Doubles Semi-finals	(Italy) Sara Errani [WC] (Italy) Andrea Vavassori [WC]	(United States) Danielle Collins [Alt] (United States) Christian Harrison [Alt]	4–2, 4–2
Mixed Doubles Final	(Italy) Sara Errani [WC] (Italy) Andrea Vavassori [WC]	(Poland) Iga Świątek [3] (Norway) Casper Ruud [3]	6–3, 5–7, [10–6]
Colored background indicates a night match
Day matches began at 11am, night matches began at 7pm Eastern Daylight Time (EDT)

== Day 1 (August 24) ==
Unlike previous years, there was no opening night ceremony.

- Seeds out:
  - Men's Singles: Daniil Medvedev [13], (Netherlands) Tallon Griekspoor [29]
  - Women's Singles: (Denmark) Clara Tauson [14], Veronika Kudermetova [24]
- Schedule of Play

Matches on main courts
Matches on Arthur Ashe Stadium
Event	Winner	Loser	Score
Men's Singles 1st Round	(United States) Ben Shelton [6]	(Peru) Ignacio Buse [Q]	6–3, 6–2, 6–4
Women's Singles 1st Round	Aryna Sabalenka [1]	(Switzerland) Rebeka Masarova	7–5, 6–1
Men's Singles 1st Round	(Serbia) Novak Djokovic [7]	(United States) Learner Tien	6–1, 7–6^{(7–3)}, 6–2
Women's Singles 1st Round	(United States) Jessica Pegula [4]	(Egypt) Mayar Sherif	6–0, 6–4
Matches on Louis Armstrong Stadium
Event	Winner	Loser	Score
Women's Singles 1st Round	(United Kingdom) Emma Raducanu	(Japan) Ena Shibahara [Q]	6–1, 6–2
Men's Singles 1st Round	(United States) Taylor Fritz [4]	(United States) Emilio Nava [WC]	7–5, 6–2, 6–3
Women's Singles 1st Round (Note: This match was originally scheduled to play on Court 12 but was moved to Louis Armstrong Stadium after the conclusion of Fritz–Nava match due to match overruns.)	(United States) Caty McNally [WC]	(Switzerland) Jil Teichmann	6–2, 6–2
Women's Singles 1st Round	(Italy) Jasmine Paolini [7]	(Australia) Destanee Aiava [Q]	6–2, 7–6^{(7–4)}
Men's Singles 1st Round	(France) Benjamin Bonzi	Daniil Medvedev [13]	6–3, 7–5, 6–7^{(5–7)}, 0–6, 6–4
Matches on Grandstand
Event	Winner	Loser	Score
Men's Singles 1st Round	(Czech Republic) Jakub Menšík [16]	(Chile) Nicolás Jarry	7–6^{(7–5)}, 6–3, 6–4
Women's Singles 1st Round	(Philippines) Alexandra Eala	(Denmark) Clara Tauson [14]	6–3, 2–6, 7–6^{(13–11)}
Women's Singles 1st Round	(United States) Emma Navarro [10]	(China) Wang Yafan [PR]	7–6^{(11–9)}, 6–3
Men's Singles 1st Round	(United States) Brandon Nakashima [30]	(Netherlands) Jesper de Jong [Q]	6–2, 6–7^{(5–7)}, 2–6, 6–2, 7–6^{(10–7)}
Matches on Stadium 17
Event	Winner	Loser	Score
Men's Singles 1st Round	(Spain) Alejandro Davidovich Fokina [18]	(Kazakhstan) Alexander Shevchenko	6–1, 6–1, 6–2
Women's Singles 1st Round	(Canada) Leylah Fernandez [31]	(Canada) Rebecca Marino [Q]	6–2, 6–1
Men's Singles 1st Round	(Czech Republic) Jiří Lehečka [20]	(Croatia) Borna Ćorić	3–6, 6–4, 7–6^{(7–5)}, 6–1
Women's Singles 1st Round	(Switzerland) Belinda Bencic [16]	(China) Zhang Shuai [Q]	6–3, 6–3
Colored background indicates a night match
Day matches began at 11am (12 pm Arthur Ashe Stadium), night matches began at 7pm Eastern Daylight Time (EDT)

== Day 2 (August 25) ==
- Seeds out:
  - Men's Singles: (France) Ugo Humbert [22], (United States) Alex Michelsen [28]
  - Women's Singles: (United States) Madison Keys [6], (Ukraine) Elina Svitolina [12], (Canada) Victoria Mboko [22], (Ukraine) Dayana Yastremska [30]
- Schedule of Play

Matches on main courts
Matches on Arthur Ashe Stadium
Event	Winner	Loser	Score
Women's Singles 1st Round	(Mexico) Renata Zarazúa	(United States) Madison Keys [6]	6–7^{(10–12)}, 7–6^{(7–3)}, 7–5
Men's Singles 1st Round	(United States) Frances Tiafoe [17]	(Japan) Yoshihito Nishioka	6–3, 7–6^{(8–6)}, 6–3
Women's Singles 1st Round	(Czech Republic) Karolína Muchová [11]	(United States) Venus Williams [WC]	6–3, 2–6, 6–1
Men's Singles 1st Round	(Spain) Carlos Alcaraz [2]	(United States) Reilly Opelka	6–4, 7–5, 6–4
Matches on Louis Armstrong Stadium
Event	Winner	Loser	Score
Women's Singles 1st Round	(Czech Republic) Barbora Krejčíková	(Canada) Victoria Mboko [22]	6–3, 6–2
Men's Singles 1st Round	(United Kingdom) Jack Draper [5]	(Argentina) Federico Agustín Gómez [Q]	6–4, 7–5, 6–7^{(7–9)}, 6–2
Men's Singles 1st Round	(Norway) Casper Ruud [12]	(Austria) Sebastian Ofner [PR]	6–1, 6–2, 7–6^{(7–5)}
Women's Singles 1st Round	Mirra Andreeva [5]	(United States) Alycia Parks	6–0, 6–1
Matches on Grandstand
Event	Winner	Loser	Score
Women's Singles 1st Round	(France) Diane Parry	(Czech Republic) Petra Kvitová [PR]	6–1, 6–0
Men's Singles 1st Round	(Brazil) João Fonseca	(Serbia) Miomir Kecmanović	7–6^{(7–3)}, 7–6^{(7–5)}, 6–3
Men's Singles 1st Round	(Denmark) Holger Rune [11]	(Netherlands) Botic van de Zandschulp	6–3, 7–6^{(7–4)}, 7–6^{(7–2)}
Women's Singles 1st Round	(Hungary) Anna Bondár	(Ukraine) Elina Svitolina [12]	6–2, 6–4
Matches on Stadium 17
Event	Winner	Loser	Score
Men's Singles 1st Round	(United Kingdom) Cameron Norrie	(United States) Sebastian Korda	7–5, 6–4, 0–0, retired
Women's Singles 1st Round	(Kazakhstan) Elena Rybakina [9]	(United States) Julieta Pareja [WC]	6–3, 6–0
Women's Singles 1st Round	(Australia) Daria Kasatkina [15]	(Romania) Elena-Gabriela Ruse	7–5, 6–1
Men's Singles 1st Round	Karen Khachanov [9]	(United States) Nishesh Basavareddy [WC]	6–7^{(5–7)}, 6–3, 7–5, 6–1
Colored background indicates a night match
Day matches began at 11am (11:30 am Arthur Ashe Stadium), night matches began at 7pm Eastern Daylight Time (EDT)

== Day 3 (August 26) ==
- Seeds out:
  - Women's Singles: Diana Shnaider [20], (United States) Sofia Kenin [26]
- Schedule of Play

Matches on main courts
Matches on Arthur Ashe Stadium
Event	Winner	Loser	Score
Women's Singles 1st Round	(Poland) Iga Świątek [2]	(Colombia) Emiliana Arango	6–1, 6–2
Men's Singles 1st Round	(Italy) Jannik Sinner [1]	(Czech Republic) Vít Kopřiva	6–1, 6–1, 6–2
Women's Singles 1st Round (Note: This match was originally scheduled to play on Court 7 but was moved to Arthur Ashe Stadium after the conclusion of Kopříva–Sinner match.)	(Czech Republic) Linda Nosková [21]	(Hungary) Dalma Gálfi [Q]	6–4, 7–5
Women's Singles 1st Round	(United States) Coco Gauff [3]	(Australia) Ajla Tomljanović	6–4, 6–7^{(2–7)}, 7–5
Men's Singles 1st Round	(Germany) Alexander Zverev [3]	(Chile) Alejandro Tabilo	6–2, 7–6^{(7–4)}, 6–4
Matches on Louis Armstrong Stadium
Event	Winner	Loser	Score
Men's Singles 1st Round	(Italy) Lorenzo Musetti [10]	(France) Giovanni Mpetshi Perricard	6–7^{(3–7)}, 6–3, 6–4, 6–4
Women's Singles 1st Round	(United States) Amanda Anisimova [8]	(Australia) Kimberly Birrell	6–3, 6–2
Women's Singles 1st Round	(Japan) Naomi Osaka [23]	(Belgium) Greet Minnen	6–3, 6–4
Men's Singles 1st Round	(United States) Tommy Paul [14]	(Denmark) Elmer Møller	6–3, 6–3, 6–1
Matches on Grandstand
Event	Winner	Loser	Score
Women's Singles 1st Round	(Ukraine) Marta Kostyuk [27]	(United Kingdom) Katie Boulter	6–4, 6–4
Men's Singles 1st Round	(Kazakhstan) Alexander Bublik [23]	(Croatia) Marin Čilić	6–4, 6–1, 6–4
Women's Singles 1st Round	(United States) Ashlyn Krueger	(United States) Sofia Kenin [26]	5–7, 6–4, 6–2
Men's Singles 1st Round	(Australia) Alex de Minaur [8]	(Australia) Christopher O'Connell	6–3, 6–4, 6–4
Men's Singles 1st Round	(United Kingdom) Jacob Fearnley	(Spain) Roberto Bautista Agut	7–5, 6–2, 5–7, 6–4
Matches on Stadium 17
Event	Winner	Loser	Score
Men's Singles 1st Round	(Canada) Denis Shapovalov [27]	(Hungary) Márton Fucsovics	6–4, 6–4, 6–0
Women's Singles 1st Round	(Romania) Jaqueline Cristian	(United States) Danielle Collins	6–2, 6–0
Men's Singles 1st Round	(Canada) Félix Auger-Aliassime [25]	(United Kingdom) Billy Harris [LL]	6–4, 7–6^{(10–8)}, 6–4
Women's Singles 1st Round	(United States) Hailey Baptiste	(Czech Republic) Kateřina Siniaková	7–5, 6–3
Colored background indicates a night match
Day matches began at 11am (11:30 am Arthur Ashe Stadium), night matches began at 7pm Eastern Daylight Time (EDT)

== Day 4 (August 27) ==
- Seeds out:
  - Men's Singles: (United Kingdom) Jack Draper [5], (Note: Withdrew the day before his scheduled second round match) (Denmark) Holger Rune [11], (Norway) Casper Ruud [12], (Czech Republic) Jakub Menšík [16], (Spain) Alejandro Davidovich Fokina [18], (United States) Brandon Nakashima [30]
  - Women's Singles: (Switzerland) Belinda Bencic [16], Liudmila Samsonova [17], (Latvia) Jeļena Ostapenko [25], (United States) McCartney Kessler [32]
- Schedule of Play

Matches on main courts
Matches on Arthur Ashe Stadium
Event	Winner	Loser	Score
Men's Singles 2nd Round	(Serbia) Novak Djokovic [7]	(United States) Zachary Svajda	6–7^{(5–7)}, 6–3, 6–3, 6–1
Women's Singles 2nd Round	(United States) Jessica Pegula [4]	Anna Blinkova	6–1, 6–3
Men's Singles 2nd Round	(Spain) Carlos Alcaraz [2]	(Italy) Mattia Bellucci	6–1, 6–0, 6–3
Women's Singles 2nd Round	Aryna Sabalenka [1]	Polina Kudermetova	7–6^{(7–4)}, 6–2
Matches on Louis Armstrong Stadium
Event	Winner	Loser	Score
Women's Singles 2nd Round	(United Kingdom) Emma Raducanu	(Indonesia) Janice Tjen [Q]	6–2, 6–1
Men's Singles 2nd Round	(United States) Taylor Fritz [4]	(South Africa) Lloyd Harris [Q]	4–6, 7–6^{(7–3)}, 6–2, 6–4
Women's Singles 2nd Round	(Italy) Jasmine Paolini [7]	(United States) Iva Jovic	6–3, 6–3
Men's Singles 2nd Round	(United States) Ben Shelton [6]	(Spain) Pablo Carreño Busta	6–4, 6–2, 6–4
Matches on Grandstand
Event	Winner	Loser	Score
Women's Singles 2nd Round	(United States) Emma Navarro [10]	(United States) Caty McNally [WC]	6–2, 6–1
Men's Singles 2nd Round	(Czech Republic) Tomáš Macháč [21]	(Brazil) João Fonseca	7–6^{(7–4)}, 6–2, 6–3
Men's Singles 2nd Round	(United States) Frances Tiafoe [17]	(United States) Martin Damm [Q]	6–4, 7–5, 6–7^{(8–10)}, 7–5
Women's Singles 2nd Round	Mirra Andreeva [5]	Anastasia Potapova	6–1, 6–3
Matches on Stadium 17
Event	Winner	Loser	Score
Women's Singles 2nd Round	Victoria Azarenka	Anastasia Pavlyuchenkova	6–3, 6–3
Men's Singles 2nd Round	(Belgium) Raphaël Collignon	(Norway) Casper Ruud [12]	6–4, 3–6, 3–6, 6–4, 7–5
Women's Singles 2nd Round	(Kazakhstan) Elena Rybakina [9]	(Czech Republic) Tereza Valentová [Q]	6–3, 7–6^{(9–7)}
Men's Singles 2nd Round	(Germany) Jan-Lennard Struff [Q]	(Denmark) Holger Rune [11]	7–6^{(7–5)}, 2–6, 6–3, 4–6, 7–5
Colored background indicates a night match
Day matches began at 11am (11:30 am Arthur Ashe Stadium), night matches began at 7pm Eastern Daylight Time (EDT)

== Day 5 (August 28) ==
- Seeds out:
  - Men's Singles: Karen Khachanov [9], (Argentina) Francisco Cerúndolo [19], (Greece) Stefanos Tsitsipas [26], (Canada) Gabriel Diallo [31]
  - Women's Doubles: (Ukraine) Lyudmyla Kichenok / (Australia) Ellen Perez [6]
- Schedule of Play

Matches on main courts
Matches on Arthur Ashe Stadium
Event	Winner	Loser	Score
Women's Singles 2nd Round	(Poland) Iga Świątek [2]	(Netherlands) Suzan Lamens	6–1, 4–6, 6–4
Men's Singles 2nd Round	(Italy) Jannik Sinner [1]	(Australia) Alexei Popyrin	6–3, 6–2, 6–2
Women's Singles 2nd Round	(United States) Coco Gauff [3]	(Croatia) Donna Vekić	7–6^{(7–5)}, 6–2
Men's Singles 2nd Round	(United States) Tommy Paul [14]	(Portugal) Nuno Borges	7–6^{(8–6)}, 6–3, 5–7, 5–7, 7–5
Matches on Louis Armstrong Stadium
Event	Winner	Loser	Score
Men's Singles 2nd Round	(Italy) Lorenzo Musetti [10]	(Belgium) David Goffin	6–4, 6–0, 6–2
Women's Singles 2nd Round	(Japan) Naomi Osaka [23]	(United States) Hailey Baptiste	6–3, 6–1
Women's Doubles 1st Round (Note: This match was originally scheduled to play on Grandstand but was moved to Louis Armstrong Stadium after the conclusion of the Osaka-Baptiste match.)	(Canada) Leylah Fernandez [WC] (United States) Venus Williams [WC]	(Ukraine) Lyudmyla Kichenok [6] (Australia) Ellen Perez [6]	7–6^{(7–4)}, 6–3
Men's Singles 2nd Round	(Germany) Alexander Zverev [3]	(United Kingdom) Jacob Fearnley	6–4, 6–4, 6–4
Women's Singles 2nd Round	(United States) Amanda Anisimova [8]	(Australia) Maya Joint	7–6^{(7–2)}, 6–2
Matches on Grandstand
Event	Winner	Loser	Score
Men's Singles 2nd Round	Andrey Rublev [15]	(United States) Tristan Boyer [WC]	6–3, 6–3, 5–7, 7–6^{(7–4)}
Women's Singles 2nd Round	(Czech Republic) Karolína Muchová [11]	(Romania) Sorana Cîrstea [PR]	7–6^{(7–0)}, 6–7^{(3–7)}, 6–4
Women's Doubles 1st Round (Note: This match was originally scheduled to play on Court 12 but was moved to Grandstand Stadium after the women's doubles match was moved to Louis Armstrong Stadium.)	(Czech Republic) Kateřina Siniaková [1] (United States) Taylor Townsend [1]	(Ukraine) Nadiia Kichenok (Indonesia) Aldila Sutjiadi	7–5, 6–2
Men's Singles 2nd Round	(Germany) Daniel Altmaier	(Greece) Stefanos Tsitsipas [26]	7–6^{(7–5)}, 1–6, 4–6, 6–3, 7–5
Matches on Stadium 17
Event	Winner	Loser	Score
Women's Singles 2nd Round	(Brazil) Beatriz Haddad Maia [18]	(Switzerland) Viktorija Golubic	6–1, 6–4
Men's Singles 2nd Round	(Italy) Flavio Cobolli [24]	(United States) Jenson Brooksby	5–7, 6–3, 6–4, 2–6, 7–6^{(10–3)}
Women's Singles 2nd Round	(Australia) Daria Kasatkina [15]	Kamilla Rakhimova	6–2, 4–6, 7–5
Men's Singles 2nd Round	(Australia) Alex de Minaur [8]	(Japan) Shintaro Mochizuki	6–2, 6–4, 6–2
Colored background indicates a night match
Day matches began at 11am (11:30 am Arthur Ashe Stadium), night matches began at 7pm Eastern Daylight Time (EDT)

== Day 6 (August 29) ==
- Seeds out:
  - Men's Singles: (United States) Ben Shelton [6], (United States) Frances Tiafoe [17], (Italy) Luciano Darderi [32]
  - Women's Singles: Mirra Andreeva [5], (Italy) Jasmine Paolini [7], (United States) Emma Navarro [10], (Belgium) Elise Mertens [19], (Canada) Leylah Fernandez [31]
  - Men's Doubles: (United Kingdom) Julian Cash / (United Kingdom) Lloyd Glasspool [1], (United States) Christian Harrison / (United States) Evan King [8], (Australia) Matthew Ebden / (Australia) Jordan Thompson [16]
  - Women's Doubles: (Chinese Taipei) Chan Hao-ching / (China) Jiang Xinyu [10], Irina Khromacheva / Kamilla Rakhimova [16]
- Schedule of Play

Matches on main courts
Matches on Arthur Ashe Stadium
Event	Winner	Loser	Score
Men's Singles 3rd Round	(Spain) Carlos Alcaraz [2]	(Italy) Luciano Darderi [32]	6–2, 6–4, 6–0
Women's Singles 3rd Round	(United States) Jessica Pegula [4]	Victoria Azarenka	6–1, 7–5
Men's Singles 3rd Round	(Serbia) Novak Djokovic [7]	(United Kingdom) Cameron Norrie	6–4, 6–7^{(4–7)}, 6–2, 6–3
Women's Singles 3rd Round	(United States) Taylor Townsend	Mirra Andreeva [5]	7–5, 6–2
Matches on Louis Armstrong Stadium
Event	Winner	Loser	Score
Women's Singles 3rd Round	(Kazakhstan) Elena Rybakina [9]	(United Kingdom) Emma Raducanu	6–1, 6–2
Men's Singles 3rd Round	(France) Adrian Mannarino	(United States) Ben Shelton [6]	3–6, 6–3, 4–6, 6–4, 0–0, retired
Women's Singles 3rd Round	Aryna Sabalenka [1]	(Canada) Leylah Fernandez [31]	6–3, 7–6^{(7–2)}
Men's Singles 3rd Round	(United States) Taylor Fritz [4]	(Switzerland) Jérôme Kym [Q]	7–6^{(7–3)}, 6–7^{(9–11)}, 6–4, 6–4
Matches on Grandstand
Event	Winner	Loser	Score
Men's Singles 3rd Round	(Czech Republic) Jiří Lehečka [20]	(Belgium) Raphaël Collignon	6–4, 6–4, 6–4
Women's Singles 3rd Round	(Czech Republic) Markéta Vondroušová	(Italy) Jasmine Paolini [7]	7–6^{(7–4)}, 6–1
Men's Singles 3rd Round	(Germany) Jan-Lennard Struff [Q]	(United States) Frances Tiafoe [17]	6–4, 6–3, 7–6^{(9–7)}
Women's Singles 3rd Round	(Czech Republic) Barbora Krejčíková	(United States) Emma Navarro [10]	4–6, 6–4, 6–4
Matches on Stadium 17
Event	Winner	Loser	Score
Men's Singles 3rd Round	(France) Arthur Rinderknech	(France) Benjamin Bonzi	4–6, 6–3, 6–3, 6–2
Women's Singles 3rd Round	(Spain) Cristina Bucșa	(Belgium) Elise Mertens [19]	3–6, 7–5, 6–3
Women's Singles 3rd Round	(United States) Ann Li	(Australia) Priscilla Hon [Q]	7–5, 6–3
Men's Singles 3rd Round	(Czech Republic) Tomáš Macháč [21]	(France) Ugo Blanchet [Q]	7–5, 6–3, 6–1
Colored background indicates a night match
Day matches began at 11am (11:30 am Arthur Ashe Stadium), night matches began at 7pm Eastern Daylight Time (EDT)

== Day 7 (August 30) ==
- Seeds out:
  - Men's Singles: (Germany) Alexander Zverev [3], (United States) Tommy Paul [14], (Italy) Flavio Cobolli [24], (Canada) Denis Shapovalov [27]
  - Women's Singles: (Australia) Daria Kasatkina [15], (Czech Republic) Linda Nosková [21], (Poland) Magdalena Fręch [28], Anna Kalinskaya [29]
  - Men's Doubles: (Finland) Harri Heliövaara / (United Kingdom) Henry Patten [3]
  - Women's Doubles: (China) Guo Hanyu / Alexandra Panova [8]
- Schedule of Play

Matches on main courts
Matches on Arthur Ashe Stadium
Event	Winner	Loser	Score
Women's Singles 3rd Round	(United States) Coco Gauff [3]	(Poland) Magdalena Fręch [28]	6–3, 6–1
Men's Singles 3rd Round	(Italy) Jannik Sinner [1]	(Canada) Denis Shapovalov [27]	5–7, 6–4, 6–3, 6–3
Women's Singles 3rd Round	(Poland) Iga Świątek [2]	Anna Kalinskaya [29]	7–6^{(7–2)}, 6–4
Men's Singles 3rd Round	(Kazakhstan) Alexander Bublik [23]	(United States) Tommy Paul [14]	7–6^{(7–5)}, 6–7^{(4–7)}, 6–3, 6–7^{(5–7)}, 6–1
Matches on Louis Armstrong Stadium
Event	Winner	Loser	Score
Men's Singles 3rd Round	(Italy) Lorenzo Musetti [10]	(Italy) Flavio Cobolli [24]	6–3, 6–2, 2–0, retired
Women's Singles 3rd Round	(Japan) Naomi Osaka [23]	(Australia) Daria Kasatkina [15]	6–0, 4–6, 6–3
Women's Doubles 2nd Round (Note: This match was originally scheduled to play on Grandstand but was moved to Louis Armstrong Stadium after the conclusion of the Kasatkina–Osaka match.)	(Canada) Leylah Fernandez [WC] (United States) Venus Williams [WC]	(Norway) Ulrikke Eikeri (Japan) Eri Hozumi	7–6^{(7–1)}, 6–1
Men's Singles 3rd Round	(Canada) Félix Auger-Aliassime [25]	(Germany) Alexander Zverev [3]	4–6, 7–6^{(9–7)}, 6–4, 6–4
Women's Singles 3rd Round	(Brazil) Beatriz Haddad Maia [18]	(Greece) Maria Sakkari	6–1, 6–2
Matches on Grandstand
Event	Winner	Loser	Score
Women's Singles 3rd Round	(Czech Republic) Karolína Muchová [11]	(Czech Republic) Linda Nosková [21]	6–7^{(5–7)}, 6–4, 6–2
Men's Singles 3rd Round	Andrey Rublev [15]	(Hong Kong) Coleman Wong [Q]	2–6, 6–4, 6–3, 4–6, 6–3
Women's Singles 3rd Round	(United States) Amanda Anisimova [8]	(Romania) Jaqueline Cristian	6–4, 4–6, 6–2
Men's Doubles 1st Round (Note: This match was originally scheduled to play on Stadium 17 but was moved to Grandstand after singles matches concluded for the day.)	(India) Yuki Bhambri [14] (New Zealand) Michael Venus [14]	(United States) Marcos Giron (United States) Learner Tien	6–0, 6–3
Matches on Stadium 17
Event	Winner	Loser	Score
Women's Doubles 2nd Round	(Hungary) Tímea Babos [11] (Brazil) Luisa Stefani [11]	(United States) Iva Jovic [WC] (United States) Clervie Ngounoue [WC]	6–4, 6–4
Men's Singles 3rd Round	(Spain) Jaume Munar	(Belgium) Zizou Bergs	6–1, 6–4, 6–4
Men's Singles 3rd Round	(Australia) Alex de Minaur [8]	(Germany) Daniel Altmaier	6–7^{(7–9)}, 6–3, 6–4, 2–0, retired
Colored background indicates a night match
Day matches began at 11am (11:30 am Arthur Ashe Stadium), night matches began at 7pm Eastern Daylight Time (EDT)

== Day 8 (August 31) ==
- Seeds out:
  - Men's Singles: (Czech Republic) Tomáš Macháč [21]
  - Women's Singles: (Kazakhstan) Elena Rybakina [9]
  - Men's Doubles: (Netherlands) Sander Arends / (United Kingdom) Luke Johnson [13]
  - Women's Doubles: (Brazil) Beatriz Haddad Maia / (Germany) Laura Siegemund [14]
- Schedule of Play

Matches on main courts
Matches on Arthur Ashe Stadium
Event	Winner	Loser	Score
Women's Singles 4th Round	(United States) Jessica Pegula [4]	(United States) Ann Li	6–1, 6–2
Men's Singles 4th Round	(Spain) Carlos Alcaraz [2]	(France) Arthur Rinderknech	7–6^{(7–3)}, 6–3, 6–4
Men's Singles 4th Round	(Serbia) Novak Djokovic [7]	(Germany) Jan-Lennard Struff [Q]	6–3, 6–3, 6–2
Women's Singles 4th Round	(Czech Republic) Markéta Vondroušová	(Kazakhstan) Elena Rybakina [9]	6–4, 5–7, 6–2
Matches on Louis Armstrong Stadium
Event	Winner	Loser	Score
Men's Singles 4th Round	(Czech Republic) Jiří Lehečka [20]	(France) Adrian Mannarino	7–6^{(7–4)}, 6–4, 2–6, 6–2
Women's Singles 4th Round	(Czech Republic) Barbora Krejčíková	(United States) Taylor Townsend	1–6, 7–6^{(15–13)}, 6–3
Men's Singles 4th Round	(United States) Taylor Fritz [4]	(Czech Republic) Tomáš Macháč [21]	6–4, 6–3, 6–3
Women's Singles 4th Round	Aryna Sabalenka [1]	(Spain) Cristina Bucșa	6–1, 6–4
Matches on Grandstand
Event	Winner	Loser	Score
Men's Doubles 2nd Round	(Argentina) Tomás Martín Etcheverry (Argentina) Camilo Ugo Carabelli	(Netherlands) Sander Arends [13] (United Kingdom) Luke Johnson [13]	7–5, 7–6^{(8–6)}
Women's Doubles 2nd Round	(Italy) Sara Errani [2] (Italy) Jasmine Paolini [2]	(United States) McCartney Kessler (United States) Peyton Stearns	6–4, 6–1
Women's Doubles 2nd Round	Ekaterina Alexandrova [12] (China) Zhang Shuai [12]	(United Kingdom) Katie Boulter (United Kingdom) Sonay Kartal	6–4, 3–6, 6–4
Men's Doubles 2nd Round	(Croatia) Nikola Mektić [11] (United States) Rajeev Ram [11]	(Chinese Taipei) Ray Ho (Germany) Hendrik Jebens	4–6, 7–6^{(7–2)}, 6–3
Matches on Stadium 17
Event	Winner	Loser	Score
Girls' Singles 1st Round	(United States) Kristina Penickova [3]	(Sweden) Nellie Taraba Wallberg	5–7, 7–6^{(7–2)}, 6–3
Women's Doubles 2nd Round	(United States) Asia Muhammad [7] (Netherlands) Demi Schuurs [7]	(Mexico) Giuliana Olmos (Czech Republic) Anna Sisková	7–6^{(7–5)}, 6–1
Men's Doubles 2nd Round	(United Kingdom) Joe Salisbury [6] (United Kingdom) Neal Skupski [6]	(United States) Maxwell Exsted [WC] (United States) Cooper Woestendick [WC]	6–4, 1–6, 6–3
Women's Doubles 2nd Round	(Hungary) Fanny Stollár (Chinese Taipei) Wu Fang-hsien	(Japan) Miyu Kato (Mexico) Renata Zarazúa	6–3, 6–2
Colored background indicates a night match
Day matches began at 11am (11:30 am Arthur Ashe Stadium), night matches began at 7pm Eastern Daylight Time (EDT)

== Day 9 (September 1) ==
- Seeds out:
  - Men's Singles: Andrey Rublev [15], (Kazakhstan) Alexander Bublik [23]
  - Women's Singles: (United States) Coco Gauff [3], Ekaterina Alexandrova [13], (Brazil) Beatriz Haddad Maia [18], (Ukraine) Marta Kostyuk [27]
  - Men's Doubles: (El Salvador) Marcelo Arévalo / (Croatia) Mate Pavić [2], (Italy) Simone Bolelli / (Italy) Andrea Vavassori [7], (Portugal) Francisco Cabral / (Austria) Lucas Miedler [12]
  - Women's Doubles: (Kazakhstan) Anna Danilina / (Serbia) Aleksandra Krunić [9], Ekaterina Alexandrova / (China) Zhang Shuai [12], (Spain) Cristina Bucșa / (United States) Nicole Melichar-Martinez [13]
- Schedule of Play

Matches on main courts
Matches on Arthur Ashe Stadium
Event	Winner	Loser	Score
Men's Singles 4th Round	(Canada) Félix Auger-Aliassime [25]	Andrey Rublev [15]	7–5, 6–3, 6–4
Women's Singles 4th Round	(Japan) Naomi Osaka [23]	(United States) Coco Gauff [3]	6–3, 6–2
Men's Singles 4th Round	(Italy) Jannik Sinner [1]	(Kazakhstan) Alexander Bublik [23]	6–1, 6–1, 6–1
Women's Singles 4th Round	(United States) Amanda Anisimova [8]	(Brazil) Beatriz Haddad Maia [18]	6–0, 6–3
Matches on Louis Armstrong Stadium
Event	Winner	Loser	Score
Men's Singles 4th Round	(Australia) Alex de Minaur [8]	(Switzerland) Leandro Riedi [Q]	6–3, 6–2, 6–1
Women's Singles 4th Round	(Poland) Iga Świątek [2]	Ekaterina Alexandrova [13]	6–3, 6–1
Men's Singles 4th Round	(Italy) Lorenzo Musetti [10]	(Spain) Jaume Munar	6–3, 6–0, 6–1
Women's Doubles 3rd Round	(Canada) Leylah Fernandez [WC] (United States) Venus Williams [WC]	Ekaterina Alexandrova [12] (China) Zhang Shuai [12]	6–3, 6–4
Matches on Grandstand
Event	Winner	Loser	Score
Men's Doubles 2nd Round	(Germany) Kevin Krawietz [4] (Germany) Tim Pütz [4]	(United States) Cooper Williams [WC] (United States) Theodore Winegar [WC]	7–6^{(9–7)}, 7–6^{(7–3)}
Women's Singles 4th Round	(Czech Republic) Karolína Muchová [11]	(Ukraine) Marta Kostyuk [27]	6–3, 6–7^{(0–7)}, 6–3
Men's Doubles 2nd Round	(United States) Robert Cash (United States) JJ Tracy	(Italy) Simone Bolelli [7] (Italy) Andrea Vavassori [7]	6–7^{(4–7)}, 7–6^{(7–2)}, 7–6^{(10–8)}
Women's Doubles 3rd Round	(Czech Republic) Kateřina Siniaková [1] (United States) Taylor Townsend [1]	(Colombia) Camila Osorio (China) Yuan Yue	6–2, 6–2
Matches on Stadium 17
Event	Winner	Loser	Score
Women's Doubles 3rd Round	(Hungary) Tímea Babos [11] (Brazil) Luisa Stefani [11]	(China) Xu Yifan (China) Yang Zhaoxuan	6–2, 4–6, 6–4
Women's Doubles 3rd Round	Mirra Andreeva [5] Diana Shnaider [5]	(Japan) Shuko Aoyama [PR] (China) Wang Yafan [PR]	7–5, 6–2
Men's Doubles 2nd Round	(Spain) Marcel Granollers [5] (Argentina) Horacio Zeballos [5]	(United States) Mackenzie McDonald [WC] (United States) Ethan Quinn [WC]	6–2, 6–2
Women's Doubles 3rd Round	(Italy) Sara Errani [2] (Italy) Jasmine Paolini [2]	(Hungary) Fanny Stollár (Chinese Taipei) Wu Fang-hsien	6–1, 2–6, 6–3
Colored background indicates a night match
Day matches began at 11am (11:30 am Arthur Ashe Stadium), night matches began at 7pm Eastern Daylight Time (EDT)

== Day 10 (September 2) ==
- Seeds out:
  - Men's Singles: (United States) Taylor Fritz [4], (Czech Republic) Jiří Lehečka [20]
  - Men's Doubles: (Argentina) Máximo González / (Argentina) Andrés Molteni [10]
  - Women's Doubles: Mirra Andreeva / Diana Shnaider [5], (United States) Asia Muhammad / (Netherlands) Demi Schuurs [7], (Hungary) Tímea Babos / (Brazil) Luisa Stefani [11]
- Schedule of Play

Matches on main courts
Matches on Arthur Ashe Stadium
Event	Winner	Loser	Score
Women's Singles Quarterfinals	(United States) Jessica Pegula [4]	(Czech Republic) Barbora Krejčíková	6–3, 6–3
Men's Singles Quarterfinals	(Spain) Carlos Alcaraz [2]	(Czech Republic) Jiří Lehečka [20]	6–4, 6–2, 6–4
Women's Singles Quarterfinals	Aryna Sabalenka [1]	(Czech Republic) Markéta Vondroušová	walkover
Men's Singles Quarterfinals	(Serbia) Novak Djokovic [7]	(United States) Taylor Fritz [4]	6–3, 7–5, 3–6, 6–4
Matches on Louis Armstrong Stadium
Event	Winner	Loser	Score
Boys' Singles 2nd Round	(United States) Jack Kennedy [9]	(Switzerland) Flynn Thomas	6–2, 1–6, 6–3
Girls' Singles 2nd Round	(United Kingdom) Hannah Klugman [2]	(India) Maaya Rajeshwaran Revathi	6–7^{(1–7)}, 6–4, 6–3
Women's Doubles Quarterfinals	(Italy) Sara Errani [2] (Italy) Jasmine Paolini [2]	(United States) Asia Muhammad [7] (Netherlands) Demi Schuurs [7]	6–1, 7–6^{(7–5)}
Women's Doubles Quarterfinals	(Czech Republic) Kateřina Siniaková [1] (United States) Taylor Townsend [1]	(Canada) Leylah Fernandez [WC] (United States) Venus Williams [WC]	6–1, 6–2
Men's Doubles 3rd Round	(United States) Robert Cash (United States) JJ Tracy	(Argentina) Máximo González [10] (Argentina) Andrés Molteni [10]	6–3, 6–3
Matches on Grandstand
Event	Winner	Loser	Score
Boys' Singles 2nd Round	(United States) Andrew Johnson [WC]	(United States) Matisse Farzam [WC]	6–4, 7–5
Girls' Singles 2nd Round	(Czech Republic) Julie Paštiková	(United States) Thea Frodin [16]	6–2, 6–1
Boys' Doubles 1st Round	(United States) Ronit Karki (United States) Jack Satterfield	(Brazil) Luis Guto Miguel [5] (Spain) Andrés Santamarta Roig [5]	walkover
Boys' Doubles 1st Round	Timofei Derepasko [4] (Bulgaria) Alexander Vasilev [4]	(India) Hitesh Chauhan (Spain) Tito Chávez	6–1, 6–4
Matches on Stadium 17
Event	Winner	Loser	Score
Girls' Singles 2nd Round	(Czech Republic) Jana Kovačková [6]	(United States) Nancy Lee [WC]	6–2, 6–2
Boys' Singles 2nd Round	(Bulgaria) Ivan Ivanov [1]	(United States) Maxwell Exsted	6–2, 6–3
Women's Doubles Quarterfinals	(Canada) Gabriela Dabrowski [3] (New Zealand) Erin Routliffe [3]	(Hungary) Tímea Babos [11] (Brazil) Luisa Stefani [11]	0–6, 6–4, 6–4
Women's Doubles Quarterfinals	Veronika Kudermetova [4] (Belgium) Elise Mertens [4]	Mirra Andreeva [5] Diana Shnaider [5]	6–4, 6–2
Colored background indicates a night match
Day matches began at 11am (11:30 am Arthur Ashe Stadium), night matches begins at 8pm (Note: The night session was originally to begin at 7pm but was pushed one hour later following Vondroušová's withdrawal.) Eastern Daylight Time (EDT)

== Day 11 (September 3) ==
- Seeds out:
  - Men's Singles: (Australia) Alex de Minaur [8], (Italy) Lorenzo Musetti [10]
  - Women's Singles: (Poland) Iga Świątek [2], (Czech Republic) Karolína Muchová [11]
  - Men's Doubles: (Croatia) Nikola Mektić / (United States) Rajeev Ram [11], (France) Sadio Doumbia / (France) Fabien Reboul [15]
  - Women's Doubles: (Italy) Sara Errani / (Italy) Jasmine Paolini [2], Veronika Kudermetova / (Belgium) Elise Mertens [4]
- Schedule of Play

Matches on main courts
Matches on Arthur Ashe Stadium
Event	Winner	Loser	Score
Men's Singles Quarterfinals	(Canada) Félix Auger-Aliassime [25]	(Australia) Alex de Minaur [8]	4–6, 7–6^{(9–7)}, 7–5, 7–6^{(7–4)}
Women's Singles Quarterfinals	(United States) Amanda Anisimova [8]	(Poland) Iga Świątek [2]	6–4, 6–3
Women's Singles Quarterfinals	(Japan) Naomi Osaka [23]	(Czech Republic) Karolína Muchová [11]	6–4, 7–6^{(7–3)}
Men's Singles Quarterfinals	(Italy) Jannik Sinner [1]	(Italy) Lorenzo Musetti [10]	6–1, 6–4, 6–2
Matches on Louis Armstrong Stadium
Event	Winner	Loser	Score
Boys' Singles 3rd Round	(Brazil) Luis Guto Miguel	(United States) Jack Kennedy [9]	6–4, 6–4
Girls' Singles 3rd Round	(Sweden) Lea Nilsson [Q]	(United States) Julieta Pareja [1]	6–4, 3–6, 6–3
Women's Doubles Semifinals	(Czech Republic) Kateřina Siniaková [1] (United States) Taylor Townsend [1]	Veronika Kudermetova [4] (Belgium) Elise Mertens [4]	6–3, 7–6^{(7–3)}
Women's Doubles Semifinals	(Canada) Gabriela Dabrowski [3] (New Zealand) Erin Routliffe [3]	(Italy) Sara Errani [2] (Italy) Jasmine Paolini [2]	6–4, 6–3
Matches on Grandstand
Event	Winner	Loser	Score
Boys' Singles 3rd Round	(United Kingdom) Oliver Bonding [14]	(Spain) Andrés Santamarta Roig [2]	6–3, 6–4
Girls' Singles 3rd Round	(Belgium) Jeline Vandromme [14]	(United States) Kristina Penickova [3]	6–2, 6–3
Boys' Doubles 2nd Round	(Germany) Jamie Mackenzie (United States) Dominick Mosejczuk	(United States) Ford McCollum [Alt] (United States) Nischal Spurling [Alt]	7–6^{(8–6)}, 4–6, [10–5]
Boys' Doubles 2nd Round	(United States) Keaton Hance [6] (United States) Jack Kennedy [6]	(Romania) Tudor Batin (Norway) Johan Oscar Lien	6–0, 6–3
Boys' Doubles 2nd Round	(Puerto Rico) Yannik Álvarez (United States) Jack Secord	(Canada) Nicolas Arseneault (Australia) Cruz Hewitt	3–6, 6–3, [10–7]
Girls' Doubles 2nd Round	(Germany) Eva Bennemann (Germany) Sonja Zhenikhova	(Japan) Reina Goto (Bulgaria) Yoana Konstantinova	7–5, 7–5
Matches on Stadium 17
Event	Winner	Loser	Score
Girls' Singles 3rd Round	(United Kingdom) Hannah Klugman [2]	(Czech Republic) Julie Paštiková	1–6, 6–3, 6–4
Girls' Singles 3rd Round	(United Kingdom) Mika Stojsavljevic [9]	(Czech Republic) Jana Kovačková [6]	5–7, 6–1, 7–5
Men's Doubles Quarterfinals	(India) Yuki Bhambri [14] (New Zealand) Michael Venus [14]	(Croatia) Nikola Mektić [11] (United States) Rajeev Ram [11]	6–3, 6–7^{(6–8)}, 6–3
Men's Doubles Quarterfinals	(United States) Robert Cash (United States) JJ Tracy	(France) Sadio Doumbia [15] (France) Fabien Reboul [15]	6–1, 7–6^{(9–7)}
Colored background indicates a night match
Day matches began at 11am (11:30 am Arthur Ashe Stadium), night matches began at 7pm Eastern Daylight Time (EDT)

== Day 12 (September 4) ==
- Seeds out:
  - Women's Singles: (United States) Jessica Pegula [4], (Japan) Naomi Osaka [23]
  - Men's Doubles: (India) Yuki Bhambri / (New Zealand) Michael Venus [14]
- Schedule of Play

Matches on main courts
Matches on Arthur Ashe Stadium
Event	Winner	Loser	Score
Women's Singles Semifinals	Aryna Sabalenka [1]	(United States) Jessica Pegula [4]	4–6, 6–3, 6–4
Women's Singles Semifinals	(United States) Amanda Anisimova [8]	(Japan) Naomi Osaka [23]	6–7^{(4–7)}, 7–6^{(7–3)}, 6–3
Matches on Louis Armstrong Stadium
Event	Winner	Loser	Score
Girls' Singles Quarterfinals	(United Kingdom) Hannah Klugman [2]	(Germany) Julia Stusek [5]	6–3, 6–2
Boys' Singles Quarterfinals	(Brazil) Luis Guto Miguel	(United Kingdom) Oliver Bonding [14]	7–6^{(7–5)}, 2–6, 6–1
Men's Doubles Semifinals	(United Kingdom) Joe Salisbury [6] (United Kingdom) Neal Skupski [6]	(India) Yuki Bhambri [14] (New Zealand) Michael Venus [14]	6–7^{(2–7)}, 7–6^{(7–5)}, 6–4
Men's Doubles Semifinals	(Spain) Marcel Granollers [5] (Argentina) Horacio Zeballos [5]	(United States) Robert Cash (United States) JJ Tracy	6–3, 3–6, 6–1
Colored background indicates a night match
Day matches began at 12pm, night matches began at 7pm Eastern Daylight Time (EDT)

== Day 13 (September 5) ==
- Seeds out:
  - Men's Singles: (Serbia) Novak Djokovic [7], (Canada) Félix Auger-Aliassime [25]
  - Women's Doubles: (Czech Republic) Kateřina Siniaková / (United States) Taylor Townsend [1]
- Schedule of Play

Matches on main court
Matches on Arthur Ashe Stadium
Event	Winner	Loser	Score
Women's Doubles Final	(Canada) Gabriela Dabrowski [3] (New Zealand) Erin Routliffe [3]	(Czech Republic) Kateřina Siniaková [1] (United States) Taylor Townsend [1]	6–4, 6–4
Men's Singles Semifinals	(Spain) Carlos Alcaraz [2]	(Serbia) Novak Djokovic [7]	6–4, 7–6^{(7–4)}, 6–2
Men's Singles Semifinals	(Italy) Jannik Sinner [1]	(Canada) Félix Auger-Aliassime [25]	6–1, 3–6, 6–3, 6–4
Colored background indicates a night match
Day matches began at 12pm, night match began at 7pm Eastern Daylight Time (EDT)

== Day 14 (September 6) ==
- Seeds out:
  - Women's Singles: (United States) Amanda Anisimova [8]
  - Men's Doubles: (United Kingdom) Joe Salisbury / (United Kingdom) Neal Skupski [6]
- Schedule of Play

Matches on main court
Matches on Arthur Ashe Stadium
Event	Winner	Loser	Score
Men's Doubles Final	(Spain) Marcel Granollers [5] (Argentina) Horacio Zeballos [5]	(United Kingdom) Joe Salisbury [6] (United Kingdom) Neal Skupski [6]	3–6, 7–6^{(7–4)}, 7–5
Women's Singles Final	Aryna Sabalenka [1]	(United States) Amanda Anisimova [8]	6–3, 7–6^{(7–3)}
Matches began at 12pm Eastern Daylight Time (EDT)

== Day 15 (September 7) ==
- Seeds out:
  - Men's Singles: (Italy) Jannik Sinner [1]
- Schedule of Play

Match on main court
Match on Arthur Ashe Stadium
Event	Winner	Loser	Score
Men's Singles Final	(Spain) Carlos Alcaraz [2]	(Italy) Jannik Sinner [1]	6–2, 3–6, 6–1, 6–4
Match began at 2pm Eastern Daylight Time (EDT)
