= 2025 US Open – Wheelchair girls' singles =

Tennis championship

Wheelchair girls' singles
- 2025 US Open

Final
- Champion: (United States) Sabina Czauz
- Runner-up: (Belgium) Luna Gryp
- Score: 7–5, 6–2
- Date: September 5, 2025

Details
- Draw: 8
- Seeds: 2

Events
Singles	men	women		boys	girls
Doubles	men	women	mixed	boys	girls
WC Singles	men	women	quad	boys	girls
WC Doubles	men	women	quad	boys	girls
- US Open

Sabina Czauz won the girls' junior wheelchair singles title at the 2025 US Open, defeating Luna Gryp in the final.

== Seeds ==
1. (Brazil) Vitória Miranda (quarterfinals)
2. (Belgium) Luna Gryp (final)

== Draw ==
Key

- Q = Qualifier
- WC = Wild card
- LL = Lucky loser
- Alt = Alternate
- ITF = ITF entry
- PR = Protected ranking
- SR = Special ranking
- SE = Special exempt
- JE = Junior exempt
- JR = Junior Accelerator Programme entrant
- CO = College Accelerator Programme entrant
- NG = Next Gen Accelerator Program entrant
- w/o = Walkover
- r = Retired
- d = Defaulted

=== Draw ===
Quarterfinals
1	(Brazil) Vitória Miranda	3	6^{2}
(Japan) Seira Matsuoka	6	7^{7}
(United States) Sabina Czauz	6	6
(United States) Lucy Heald	0	0
(Sweden) Emma Gjerseth	6	6
(Germany) Ela Porges	4	1
(United Kingdom) Ellen Tribley	0	2
2	(Belgium) Luna Gryp	6	6

Semifinals
(Japan) Seira Matsuoka	2	6^{5}
(United States) Sabina Czauz	6	7^{7}
(Sweden) Emma Gjerseth	1	1
2	(Belgium) Luna Gryp	6	6

Final
(United States) Sabina Czauz	7	6
2	(Belgium) Luna Gryp	5	2
