= Zhu Zhenzhen =

Chinese wheelchair tennis player

- Country (sports): China
- Residence: Liaocheng, China
- Born: 6 April 1989 (age 37)
- Turned pro: 2007
- Plays: Left-handed (one-handed backhand)

Singles
- Career record: 257–106
- Career titles: 21
- Highest ranking: No. 4 (8 August 2022)
- Current ranking: No. 8 (20 January 2025)

Grand Slam singles results
- Australian Open: SF (2020)
- French Open: F (2024)
- Wimbledon: QF (2023)
- US Open: QF (2025)

Other tournaments
- Masters: RR (2021, 2022)
- Paralympic Games: QF (2016)

Doubles
- Career record: 200–77
- Career titles: 21
- Highest ranking: No. 4 (31 December 2021)
- Current ranking: No. 7 (20 January 2025)

Grand Slam doubles results
- Australian Open: F (2023, 2025, 2026)
- French Open: W (2026)
- Wimbledon: W (2026)
- US Open: W (2026)

Other doubles tournaments
- Masters Doubles: W (2025)
- Paralympic Games: QF (2016)
Medal record
Asian Para Games
Gold medal – first place	2018 Jakarta	Doubles
Silver medal – second place	2018 Jakarta	Singles
Silver medal – second place	2022 Hangzhou	Singles
Silver medal – second place	2022 Hangzhou	Doubles

Zhu Zhenzhen (Chinese: 朱珍珍; pinyin: Zhū Zhēn Zhēn，born 6 April 1989) is a Chinese wheelchair tennis player. She became the first Chinese wheelchair tennis player to compete at a major at the 2020 Australian Open, where she reached the singles semifinals by defeating the defending champion and world No. 1 Diede de Groot.

== Personal life ==
Zhu contracted osteomyelitis when she was two years old. She started playing wheelchair tennis in 2005 aged 16.

== Career statistics ==
=== Grand Slam performance timelines ===
Key
W	F	SF	QF	#R	RR	Q#	DNQ	A	NH

(W) winner; (F) finalist; (SF) semifinalist; (QF) quarterfinalist; (#R) rounds 4, 3, 2, 1; (RR) round-robin stage; (Q#) qualification round; (DNQ) did not qualify; (A) absent; (NH) not held; (SR) strike rate (events won / competed); (W–L) win–loss record.
To avoid confusion and double counting, these charts are updated at the conclusion of a tournament or when the player's participation has ended.

==== Wheelchair singles ====
Tournament	2020	2021	2022	2023	2024	2025	2026	Career SR
Australian Open	SF	A	QF	QF	QF	1R	1R	0 / 6
French Open	A	A	1R	1R	F	1R	1R	0 / 5
Wimbledon	A	A	A	QF	1R	1R	1R	0 / 4
US Open	A	A	1R	1R	NH	QF		0 / 3

==== Wheelchair doubles ====
Tournament	2020	2021	2022	2023	2024	2025	2026	Career SR
Australian Open	SF	A	SF	F	SF	F	F	0 / 6
French Open	A	A	SF	SF	SF	SF	W	1 / 5
Wimbledon	A	A	A	SF	SF	SF	W	1 / 4
US Open	A	A	SF	SF	NH	F		0 / 3

=== Grand Slam tournament finals ===
==== Wheelchair singles: 1 (runner-up) ====
Result	Year	Championship	Surface	Opponent	Score
Loss	2024	French Open	Clay	(Netherlands) Diede de Groot	6–4, 2–6, 3–6

==== Wheelchair doubles: 6 (2 title, 4 runner-ups) ====
Result	Year	Championship	Surface	Partner	Opponent	Score
Loss	2023	Australian Open	Hard	(Japan) Yui Kamiji	(Netherlands) Diede de Groot (Netherlands) Aniek van Koot	3–6, 2–6
Loss	2025	Australian Open	Hard	(Japan) Manami Tanaka	(China) Li Xiaomi (China) Wang Ziying	2–6, 3–6
Loss	2025	US Open	Hard	(Netherlands) Diede de Groot	(China) Li Xiaohui (China) Wang Ziying	4–6, 6–7(4–7)
Loss	2026	Australian Open	Hard	(Japan) Yui Kamiji	(China) Li Xiaohui (China) Wang Ziying	4–6, 3–6
Won	2026	French Open	Clay	(Japan) Yui Kamiji	(Netherlands) Jinte Bos (Netherlands) Lizzy de Greef	6–3, 6–0
Won	2026	Wimbledon	Grass	(Japan) Yui Kamiji	(China) Li Xiaohui (China) Wang Ziying	6–4, 7–5
