= 2025 US Open – Wheelchair quad doubles =

Tennis championship

Wheelchair quad doubles
- 2025 US Open

Final
- Champions: (Israel) Guy Sasson (Netherlands) Niels Vink
- Runners-up: (Chile) Francisco Cayulef (Argentina) Gonzalo Enrique Lazarte
- Score: 6–1, 6–1
- Date: September 5, 2025

Details
- Draw: 8
- Seeds: 2

Events
Singles	men	women		boys	girls
Doubles	men	women	mixed	boys	girls
WC Singles	men	women	quad	boys	girls
WC Doubles	men	women	quad	boys	girls
- US Open

Three-time defending champion Niels Vink and his partner Guy Sasson defeated Francisco Cayulef and Gonzalo Enrique Lazarte in the final, 6–1, 6–1 to win the quad doubles wheelchair tennis title at the 2025 US Open.

Sam Schröder and Vink were the three-time defending champions, but chose not to compete together this year. Schröder partnered Ahmet Kaplan, but lost in the semifinals to Cayulef and Enrique Lazarte.

There was no edition of the event in 2024 due to a scheduling conflict with the 2024 Summer Paralympics.

== Seeds ==
1. (Israel) Guy Sasson / (Netherlands) Niels Vink (champions)
2. (United Kingdom) Andy Lapthorne / (United States) David Wagner (quarterfinals)

== Draw ==
Key

- Q = Qualifier
- WC = Wild card
- LL = Lucky loser
- Alt = Alternate
- ITF = ITF entry
- PR = Protected ranking
- SR = Special ranking
- SE = Special exempt
- JE = Junior exempt
- JR = Junior Accelerator Programme entrant
- CO = College Accelerator Programme entrant
- NG = Next Gen Accelerator Program entrant
- w/o = Walkover
- r = Retired
- d = Defaulted

=== Finals ===
Quarterfinals
1	(Israel) Guy Sasson (Netherlands) Niels Vink	6	6
(United States) Andrew Bogdanov (Australia) Benjamin Wenzel	2	2
(United Kingdom) Gregory Slade (Australia) Jin Woodman	6	6^{6}	[10]
(Australia) Heath Davidson (Canada) Robert Shaw	1	7^{8}	[7]
(Turkey) Ahmet Kaplan (Netherlands) Sam Schröder	6	6
(Brazil) Leandro Pena (South Africa) Donald Ramphadi	3	2
(Chile) Francisco Cayulef (Argentina) Gonzalo Enrique Lazarte	6	5	[12]
2	(United Kingdom) Andy Lapthorne (United States) David Wagner	3	7	[10]

Semifinals
1	(Israel) Guy Sasson (Netherlands) Niels Vink	6	6
(United Kingdom) Gregory Slade (Australia) Jin Woodman	3	0
(Turkey) Ahmet Kaplan (Netherlands) Sam Schröder	4	3
(Chile) Francisco Cayulef (Argentina) Gonzalo Enrique Lazarte	6	6

Final
1	(Israel) Guy Sasson (Netherlands) Niels Vink	6	6
(Chile) Francisco Cayulef (Argentina) Gonzalo Enrique Lazarte	1	1
