= 2025 US Open – Wheelchair quad singles =

Tennis championship

Wheelchair quad singles
- 2025 US Open

Final
- Champion: (Netherlands) Niels Vink
- Runner-up: (Netherlands) Sam Schröder
- Score: 7–5, 6–3
- Date: September 6, 2025

Details
- Draw: 16
- Seeds: 4

Events
Singles	men	women		boys	girls
Doubles	men	women	mixed	boys	girls
WC Singles	men	women	quad	boys	girls
WC Doubles	men	women	quad	boys	girls
- US Open

Niels Vink defeated defending champion Sam Schröder in a rematch of the previous two years' finals, 7–5, 6–3 to win the quad singles wheelchair tennis title at the 2025 US Open.

There was no edition of the event in 2024 due to a scheduling conflict with the 2024 Summer Paralympics.

== Seeds ==
1. (Netherlands) Niels Vink (champion)
2. (Netherlands) Sam Schröder (final)
3. (Israel) Guy Sasson (semifinals)
4. (Turkey) Ahmet Kaplan (first round)

== Draw ==
Key

- Q = Qualifier
- WC = Wild card
- LL = Lucky loser
- Alt = Alternate
- ITF = ITF entry
- PR = Protected ranking
- SR = Special ranking
- SE = Special exempt
- JE = Junior exempt
- JR = Junior Accelerator Programme entrant
- CO = College Accelerator Programme entrant
- NG = Next Gen Accelerator Program entrant
- w/o = Walkover
- r = Retired
- d = Defaulted

=== Finals ===
First round
1	(Netherlands) Niels Vink	6	6
(Australia) Benjamin Wenzel	3	1
(Brazil) Leandro Pena	3	6	6^{9}
(United Kingdom) Gregory Slade	6	4	7^{11}
3	(Israel) Guy Sasson	6	6
(Chile) Francisco Cayulef	0	3
(Canada) Robert Shaw	5	6	7^{10}
(United States) Andrew Bogdanov	7	2	6^{4}
(South Africa) Donald Ramphadi	2	3
(United Kingdom) Andy Lapthorne	6	6
(Australia) Jin Woodman	6	4	6
4	(Turkey) Ahmet Kaplan	1	6	2
(Argentina) Gonzalo Enrique Lazarte	6	6
(United States) David Wagner	3	3
(Australia) Heath Davidson	3	1
2	(Netherlands) Sam Schröder	6	6

Quarterfinals
1	(Netherlands) N Vink	6	7
(United Kingdom) G Slade	1	5
3	(Israel) G Sasson	6	6
(Canada) R Shaw	0	1
(United Kingdom) A Lapthorne	6	4	6
(Australia) J Woodman	4	6	1
(Argentina) GE Lazarte	1	0
2	(Netherlands) S Schröder	6	6

Semifinals
1	(Netherlands) N Vink	6	6
3	(Israel) G Sasson	3	4
(United Kingdom) A Lapthorne	1	0
2	(Netherlands) S Schröder	6	6

Final
1	(Netherlands) N Vink	6	7
2	(Netherlands) S Schröder	1	5
