= 2025 US Open – Wheelchair boys' singles =

Wheelchair boys' singles
- 2025 US Open
- Final date: September 5, 2025

Final
- Champion: (Austria) Maximilian Taucher
- Runner-up: (Belgium) Alexander Lantermann
- Score: 6–4, 6–1

Details
- Draw: 8
- Seeds: 2

Events
Singles	men	women		boys	girls
Doubles	men	women	mixed	boys	girls
WC Singles	men	women	quad	boys	girls
WC Doubles	men	women	quad	boys	girls
- US Open

In a battle of top seeds, No. 1 seed Maximilian Taucher defeated No. 2 seed Alexander Lantermann, 6–4, 6–1, to win the boys' wheelchair singles final at the 2025 US Open. Taucher who already is a two-time junior wheelchair Roland Garros champion lifted his first trophy at Flushing Meadows after reaching the semifinals for the past three consecutive years.

== Seeds ==
1. (Austria) Maximilian Taucher (champion)
2. (Belgium) Alexander Lantermann (final)

== Draw ==
Key

- Q = Qualifier
- WC = Wild card
- LL = Lucky loser
- Alt = Alternate
- ITF = ITF entry
- PR = Protected ranking
- SR = Special ranking
- SE = Special exempt
- JE = Junior exempt
- JR = Junior Accelerator Programme entrant
- CO = College Accelerator Programme entrant
- NG = Next Gen Accelerator Program entrant
- w/o = Walkover
- r = Retired
- d = Defaulted

=== Draw ===
Quarterfinals
1	(Austria) Maximilian Taucher	6	6
(Brazil) Luiz Calixto	2	0
(United Kingdom) Ruben Harris	4	6	6
(United States) Tomas Majetic	6	4	4
(United States) Maximus Wong	2	1
(United Kingdom) Lucas John De Gouveia	6	6
(Japan) Ryota Kawada	1	0
2	(Belgium) Alexander Lantermann	6	6

Semifinals
1	(Austria) Maximilian Taucher	6	7^{7}
(United Kingdom) Ruben Harris	0	6^{5}
(United Kingdom) Lucas John De Gouveia	1	1
2	(Belgium) Alexander Lantermann	6	6

Final
1	(Austria) Maximilian Taucher	6	6
2	(Belgium) Alexander Lantermann	4	1
