= 2025 US Open – Wheelchair women's singles =

Tennis championship

Wheelchair women's singles
- 2025 US Open
- Final date: September 6, 2025

Final
- Champion: (Japan) Yui Kamiji
- Runner-up: (China) Li Xiaohui
- Score: 0–6, 6–1, 6–3

Details
- Draw: 16
- Seeds: 4

Events
| Singles | men | women | | boys | girls |
| Doubles | men | women | mixed | boys | girls |
| WC Singles | men | women | quad | boys | girls |
| WC Doubles | men | women | quad | boys | girls |
- US Open

Yui Kamiji defeated Li Xiaohui in the final, 0–6, 6–1, 6–3 to win the women's singles wheelchair tennis title at the 2025 US Open.

Diede de Groot was the six-time defending champion, but lost in the quarterfinals to Kamiji in a rematch of the past seven years' finals.

There was no edition of the event in 2024 due to a scheduling conflict with the 2024 Summer Paralympics.

== Seeds ==
1. (Japan) Yui Kamiji (champion)
2. (Netherlands) Aniek van Koot (semifinals)
3. (China) Li Xiaohui (final)
4. (China) Wang Ziying (semifinals)

== Draw ==
Key

- Q = Qualifier
- WC = Wild card
- LL = Lucky loser
- Alt = Alternate
- ITF = ITF entry
- PR = Protected ranking
- SR = Special ranking
- SE = Special exempt
- JE = Junior exempt
- JR = Junior Accelerator Programme entrant
- CO = College Accelerator Programme entrant
- NG = Next Gen Accelerator Program entrant
- w/o = Walkover
- r = Retired
- d = Defaulted

=== Draw ===
First round
1 | (Japan) Yui Kamiji | 5 | 6 | 6
(Netherlands) Lizzy de Greef | 7 | 2 | 1
(Netherlands) Diede de Groot | 6 | 6
(United Kingdom) Lucy Shuker | 3 | 0
4 | (China) Wang Ziying | 7 | 6
(Netherlands) Jinte Bos | 5 | 2
(Colombia) Angélica Bernal | 6 | 6
(Japan) Manami Tanaka | 4 | 4
(China) Zhu Zhenzhen | 6 | 6
WC | (United States) Maylee Phelps | 2 | 0
(Netherlands) Jiske Griffioen | 2 | 6^{5}
3 | (China) Li Xiaohui | 6 | 7^{7}
(South Africa) Kgothatso Montjane | 4 | 4
(France) Ksénia Chasteau | 6 | 6
(Japan) Saki Takamuro | 4 | 1
2 | (Netherlands) Aniek van Koot | 6 | 6

Quarterfinals
1 | (Japan) Y Kamiji | 3 | 6 | 6
(Netherlands) D de Groot | 6 | 4 | 4
4 | (China) Z Wang | 6 | 6
(Colombia) A Bernal | 0 | 2
(China) Z Zhu | 6 | 6^{1} | 1
3 | (China) X Li | 3 | 7^{7} | 6
(France) K Chasteau | 5 | 4
2 | (Netherlands) A van Koot | 7 | 6

Semifinals
1 | (Japan) Y Kamiji | 6 | 7
4 | (China) Z Wang | 4 | 5
3 | (China) X Li | 7 | 7
2 | (Netherlands) A van Koot | 5 | 5

Final
1 | (Japan) Y Kamiji | 0 | 6 | 6
3 | (China) X Li | 6 | 1 | 3
