= 2025 US Open – Wheelchair girls' doubles =

Tennis championship

Wheelchair girls' doubles
- 2025 US Open

Final
- Champions: (United States) Sabina Czauz (Japan) Seira Matsuoka
- Runners-up: (United States) Lucy Heald (Germany) Ela Porges
- Score: 6–0, 6–1
- Date: September 5, 2025

Details
- Draw: 4
- Seeds: 2

Events
Singles	men	women		boys	girls
Doubles	men	women	mixed	boys	girls
WC Singles	men	women	quad	boys	girls
WC Doubles	men	women	quad	boys	girls
- US Open

Sabina Czauz and Seira Matsuoka, defeated Lucy Heald and Ela Porges, 6–0, 6–1, in the girls' doubles title match 2025 US Open.

== Seeds ==
1. (Belgium) Luna Gryp / (Brazil) Vitória Miranda (semifinals)
2. (Sweden) Emma Gjerseth / (United Kingdom) Ellen Tribley (semifinals)

== Draw ==
Key

- Q = Qualifier
- WC = Wild card
- LL = Lucky loser
- Alt = Alternate
- ITF = ITF entry
- PR = Protected ranking
- SR = Special ranking
- SE = Special exempt
- JE = Junior exempt
- JR = Junior Accelerator Programme entrant
- CO = College Accelerator Programme entrant
- NG = Next Gen Accelerator Program entrant
- w/o = Walkover
- r = Retired
- d = Defaulted

=== Finals ===
Semifinals
1	(Belgium) Luna Gryp (Brazil) Vitória Miranda	4	3
(United States) Sabina Czauz (Japan) Seira Matsuoka	6	6
(United States) Lucy Heald (Germany) Ela Porges	7^{8}	6
2	(Sweden) Emma Gjerseth (United Kingdom) Ellen Tribley	6^{6}	4

Final
(United States) Sabina Czauz (Japan) Seira Matsuoka	6	6
(United States) Lucy Heald (Germany) Ela Porges	0	1
