= Wang Ziying =

Chinese wheelchair tennis player

- Native name: 王紫莹
- Born: 15 August 1998 (age 28)
- Turned pro: 2015
- Plays: Right-handed (one-handed backhand)

Singles
- Career record: 128-44
- Career titles: 14
- Highest ranking: No. 4 (10 June 2024)
- Current ranking: No. 4 (20 January 2025)

Grand Slam singles results
- Australian Open: SF (2025, 2026)
- French Open: QF (2024, 2025, 2026)
- Wimbledon: W (2025)
- US Open: SF (2025)

Other tournaments
- Paralympic Games: QF (2020)

Doubles
- Career record: 78-41
- Career titles: 14
- Highest ranking: No. 13 (24 June 2024)
- Current ranking: No. 13 (10 June 2024)

Grand Slam doubles results
- Australian Open: W (2025, 2026)
- French Open: F (2025)
- Wimbledon: W (2025)
- US Open: W (2025)

Other doubles tournaments
- Paralympic Games: SF – 4th (2020)

Wang Ziying (Chinese: 王紫莹; pinyin: Wáng Zǐyíng; born 15 August 1998) is a Chinese wheelchair tennis player, she is currently ranked at world number four as of 20 January 2025. She won the Wimbledon wheelchair singles title in 2025. She has competed at the 2020 Summer Paralympics and is a 2024 French Open singles' and doubles' quarterfinalist. Partnering Li Xiaohui, Wang won the wheelchair women's doubles title at the 2025 Australian Open.

== Career statistics ==
=== Performance timelines ===
Key
W	F	SF	QF	#R	RR	Q#	DNQ	A	NH

(W) winner; (F) finalist; (SF) semifinalist; (QF) quarterfinalist; (#R) rounds 4, 3, 2, 1; (RR) round-robin stage; (Q#) qualification round; (DNQ) did not qualify; (A) absent; (NH) not held; (SR) strike rate (events won / competed); (W–L) win–loss record.
To avoid confusion and double counting, these charts are updated at the conclusion of a tournament or when the player's participation has ended.

==== Wheelchair singles ====
Tournament	2024	2025	2026	Career SR
Australian Open	A	SF	SF	0 / 2
French Open	QF	QF	QF	0 / 3
Wimbledon	SF	W	SF	1 / 3
US Open	NH	SF	QF	0 / 2

==== Wheelchair doubles ====
Tournament	2024	2025	2026	Career SR
Australian Open	A	W	W	2 / 2
French Open	QF	F		0 / 2
Wimbledon	SF	W	F	1 / 3
US Open	NH	W		1 / 1

=== Grand Slam Finals ===
==== Wheelchair singles: 1 final (1 title) ====
Result	Year	Championship	Surface	Opponent	Score
Win	2025	Wimbledon	Grass	(Japan) Yui Kamiji	6–3, 6–3

==== Wheelchair doubles: 5 finals (4 titles, 1 runner up) ====
Result	Year	Championship	Surface	Partner	Opponents	Score
Win	2025	Australian Open	Hard	(China) Li Xiaohui	(Japan) Manami Tanaka (China) Zhu Zhenzhen	6–2, 6–3
Loss	2025	French Open	Clay	(China) Li Xiaohui	(Japan) Yui Kamiji (South Africa) Kgothatso Montjane	6–4, 5–7, [7–10]
Win	2025	Wimbledon	Grass	(China) Li Xiaohui	(Colombia) Angélica Bernal (France) Ksénia Chasteau	6–3, 6–1
Win	2025	US Open	Hard	(China) Li Xiaohui	(Netherlands) Diede de Groot (China) Zhu Zhenzhen	6–4, 7–6^{(7–4)}
Win	2026	Australian Open	Hard	(China) Li Xiaohui	(Japan) Yui Kamiji (China) Zhu Zhenzhen	6–4, 6–3
Loss	2026	Wimbledon	Grass	(China) Li Xiaohui	(Japan) Yui Kamiji (China) Zhu Zhenzhen	4–6, 5–7
