= 2025 US Open – Wheelchair women's doubles =

Tennis championship

Wheelchair women's doubles
- 2025 US Open
- Final date: September 5, 2025

Final
- Champions: (China) Li Xiaohui (China) Wang Ziying
- Runners-up: (Netherlands) Diede de Groot (China) Zhu Zhenzhen
- Score: 6–4, 7–6^{(7–4)}

Details
- Draw: 8
- Seeds: 2

Events
Singles	men	women		boys	girls
Doubles	men	women	mixed	boys	girls
WC Singles	men	women	quad	boys	girls
WC Doubles	men	women	quad	boys	girls
- US Open

Li Xiaohui and Wang Ziying defeated Diede de Groot and Zhu Zhenzhen in the final, 6–4, 7–6^{(7–4)} to win the women's doubles wheelchair tennis title at the 2025 US Open.

Yui Kamiji and Kgothatso Montjane were the defending champions, but they lost in the semifinals to De Groot and Zhu.

There was no edition of the event in 2024 due to a scheduling conflict with the 2024 Summer Paralympics.

== Seeds ==
1. (Japan) Manami Tanaka / (Netherlands) Aniek van Koot (quarterfinals)
2. (China) Li Xiaohui / (China) Wang Ziying (champions)

== Draw ==
Key

- Q = Qualifier
- WC = Wild card
- LL = Lucky loser
- Alt = Alternate
- ITF = ITF entry
- PR = Protected ranking
- SR = Special ranking
- SE = Special exempt
- JE = Junior exempt
- JR = Junior Accelerator Programme entrant
- CO = College Accelerator Programme entrant
- NG = Next Gen Accelerator Program entrant
- w/o = Walkover
- r = Retired
- d = Defaulted

=== Finals ===
Quarterfinals
1	(Japan) Manami Tanaka (Netherlands) Aniek van Koot	2	4
(Netherlands) Diede de Groot (China) Zhu Zhenzhen	6	6
(Japan) Yui Kamiji (South Africa) Kgothatso Montjane	6	6
(Colombia) Angélica Bernal (France) Ksénia Chasteau	4	3
(United States) Maylee Phelps (Japan) Saki Takamuro	2	0
(Netherlands) Jiske Griffioen (United Kingdom) Lucy Shuker	6	6
(Netherlands) Jinte Bos (Netherlands) Lizzy de Greef	1	4
2	(China) Li Xiaohui (China) Wang Ziying	6	6

Semifinals
(Netherlands) Diede de Groot (China) Zhu Zhenzhen	7	7
(Japan) Yui Kamiji (South Africa) Kgothatso Montjane	5	5
(Netherlands) Jiske Griffioen (United Kingdom) Lucy Shuker	4	2
2	(China) Li Xiaohui (China) Wang Ziying	6	6

Final
(Netherlands) Diede de Groot (China) Zhu Zhenzhen	4	6^{4}
2	(China) Li Xiaohui (China) Wang Ziying	6	7^{7}
