= 2025 US Open – Girls' singles =

Tennis championship

Girls' singles
- 2025 US Open

Final
- Champion: (Belgium) Jeline Vandromme
- Runner-up: (Sweden) Lea Nilsson
- Score: 7–6^{(7–2)}, 6–2
- Date: September 6, 2025

Details
- Draw: 16
- Seeds: 64

Events
Singles	men	women		boys	girls
Doubles	men	women	mixed	boys	girls
WC Singles	men	women	quad	boys	girls
WC Doubles	men	women	quad	boys	girls
- US Open

Jeline Vandromme won the girls' singles title at the 2025 US Open, defeating Lea Nilsson in the final, 7–6^{(7–2)}, 6–2. She did not lose a set en route to the title.

Mika Stojsavljevic was the defending champion, but lost in the semifinals to Nilsson.

== Seeds ==
1. (United States) Julieta Pareja (third round)
2. (United Kingdom) Hannah Klugman (semifinals)
3. (United States) Kristina Penickova (third round)
4. (Slovakia) Mia Pohánková (quarterfinals)
5. (Germany) Julia Stusek (quarterfinals)
6. (Czech Republic) Jana Kovačková (third round)
7. (Czech Republic) Alena Kovačková (first round)
8. (Spain) Charo Esquiva Bañuls (quarterfinals)
9. (United Kingdom) Mika Stojsavljevic (semifinals)
10. (Lithuania) Laima Vladson (first round)
11. (China) Zhang Ruien (first round)
12. (Argentina) Luna María Cinalli (first round)
13. (Bulgaria) Elizara Yaneva (first round)
14. (Belgium) Jeline Vandromme (champion)
15. (Brazil) Victoria Luiza Barros (first round)
16. (United States) Thea Frodin (second round)

Click on the seed number of a player to go to their draw section.

== Draw ==
Key

- Q = Qualifier
- WC = Wild card
- LL = Lucky loser
- Alt = Alternate
- ITF = ITF entry
- PR = Protected ranking
- SR = Special ranking
- SE = Special exempt
- JE = Junior exempt
- JR = Junior Accelerator Programme entrant
- CO = College Accelerator Programme entrant
- NG = Next Gen Accelerator Program entrant
- w/o = Walkover
- r = Retired
- d = Defaulted

=== Finals ===
Quarterfinals
Q	(Sweden) Lea Nilsson	6	6
8	(Spain) Charo Esquiva Bañuls	4	1
4	(Slovakia) Mia Pohánková	4	2
9	(United Kingdom) Mika Stojsavljevic	6	6
(France) Ksenia Efremova	1	3
14	(Belgium) Jeline Vandromme	6	6
5	(Germany) Julia Stusek	3	2
2	(United Kingdom) Hannah Klugman	6	6

Semifinals
Q	(Sweden) Lea Nilsson	0	6	6
9	(United Kingdom) Mika Stojsavljevic	6	1	1
14	(Belgium) Jeline Vandromme	6	6
2	(United Kingdom) Hannah Klugman	3	2

Final
Q	(Sweden) Lea Nilsson	6^{2}	2
14	(Belgium) Jeline Vandromme	7^{7}	6

=== Top half ===
==== Section 1 ====
First round
1	(United States) Julieta Pareja	6	6
(Israel) Mika Buchnik	3	1
(Canada) Nadia Lagaev	6	6
(Latvia) Beatrise Zeltiņa	4	4
Q	(Sweden) Lea Nilsson	7^{7}	6
Q	(Serbia) Lana Virc	6^{3}	1
SE	(United States) Anita Tu	6	6
13	(Bulgaria) Elizara Yaneva	4	2
11	(China) Zhang Ruien	4	1
(Germany) Eva Bennemann	6	6
(Japan) Kanon Sawashiro	7	6
(United States) Maya Iyengar	5	1
(United States) Leena Friedman	6	5	3
Q	(United Kingdom) Ruby Cooling	3	7	6
(Czech Republic) Sarah Melany Fajmonová	3	6	1
8	(Spain) Charo Esquiva Bañuls	6	3	6

Second round
1	(United States) J Pareja	6	6
(Canada) N Lagaev	2	2
Q	(Sweden) L Nilsson	6	6
SE	(United States) A Tu	2	2
(Germany) E Bennemann	7	2	2
(Japan) K Sawashiro	5	6	6
Q	(United Kingdom) R Cooling	1	4
8	(Spain) C Esquiva Bañuls	6	6

Third round
1	(United States) J Pareja	4	6	3
Q	(Sweden) L Nilsson	6	3	6
(Japan) K Sawashiro	0	6	4
8	(Spain) C Esquiva Bañuls	6	3	6

Quarterfinals
Q	(Sweden) L Nilsson	6	6
8	(Spain) C Esquiva Bañuls	4	1

==== Section 2 ====
First round
4	(Slovakia) Mia Pohánková	6	6
(United Kingdom) Allegra Korpanec Davies	0	4
Q	(France) Daphnée Mpetshi Perricard	5	4
WC	(United States) Bella Payne	7	6
(China) Shao Yushan	6	6
WC	(United States) Lani Chang	3	2
(Australia) Renee Alame	7^{8}	6
15	(Brazil) Victoria Luiza Barros	6^{6}	3
9	(United Kingdom) Mika Stojsavljevic	6	6
(Argentina) Sol Ailin Larraya Guidi	2	1
(Turkey) Deniz Dılek	6	6
SE	(United States) Kori Montoya	2	3
(Germany) Sonja Zhenikhova	2	1
WC	(United States) Nancy Lee	6	6
(China) Qu Yihan	7^{7}	5	0
6	(Czech Republic) Jana Kovačková	6^{5}	7	6

Second round
4	(Slovakia) M Pohánková	6	6
WC	(United States) B Payne	1	4
(China) Y Shao	3	6	7
(Australia) R Alame	6	2	5
9	(United Kingdom) M Stojsavljevic	6	7^{7}
(Turkey) D Dılek	3	6^{2}
WC	(United States) N Lee	2	2
6	(Czech Republic) J Kovačková	6	6

Third round
4	(Slovakia) M Pohánková	6	6
(China) Y Shao	3	4
9	(United Kingdom) M Stojsavljevic	5	6	7
6	(Czech Republic) J Kovačková	7	1	5

Quarterfinals
4	(Slovakia) M Pohánková	4	2
9	(United Kingdom) M Stojsavljevic	6	6

=== Bottom half ===
==== Section 3 ====
First round
7	(Czech Republic) Alena Kovačková	3	1
(France) Ksenia Efremova	6	6
WC	(United States) Janae Preston	7^{7}	6
(Brazil) Nauhany Vitória Leme da Silva	6^{5}	1
WC	(United States) Hannah Ayrault	6^{4}	3
Q	(Japan) Riyo Yoshida	7^{7}	6
(China) Sun Xinran	6	6
10	(Lithuania) Laima Vladson	3	4
14	(Belgium) Jeline Vandromme	6	6
WC	(United States) Alexis Nguyen	0	3
(Thailand) Kamonwan Yodpetch	6	6
(Serbia) Anastasija Cvetković	2	4
(United Kingdom) Brooke Black	4	5
(Romania) Maia Ilinca Burcescu	6	7
(Sweden) Nellie Taraba Wallberg	7	6^{2}	3
3	(United States) Kristina Penickova	5	7^{7}	6

Second round
(France) K Efremova	6	6
WC	(United States) J Preston	3	1
Q	(Japan) R Yoshida	4	1
(China) X Sun	6	6
14	(Belgium) J Vandromme	6	6
(Thailand) K Yodpetch	3	2
(Romania) MI Burcescu	1	5
3	(United States) K Penickova	6	7

Third round
(France) K Efremova	6	6
(China) X Sun	2	0
14	(Belgium) J Vandromme	6	6
3	(United States) K Penickova	2	3

Quarterfinals
(France) K Efremova	1	3
14	(Belgium) J Vandromme	6	6

==== Section 4 ====
First round
5	(Germany) Julia Stusek	6	6
WC	(United States) Tianmei Wang	1	1
Ekaterina Tupitsyna	4	6	2
(Japan) Reina Goto	6	4	6
(Slovakia) Kali Šupová	6	2	3
WC	(United States) Welles Newman	4	6	6
(Australia) Tahlia Kokkinis	7^{7}	6
12	(Argentina) Luna María Cinalli	6^{3}	2
16	(United States) Thea Frodin	6	6
Q	(Spain) Eugenia Zozaya Menéndez	4	0
(Bulgaria) Yoana Konstantinova	5	6	4
(Czech Republic) Julie Paštiková	7	4	6
Q	(China) Wei Zhangqian	6^{5}	3
(India) Maaya Rajeshwaran Revathi	7^{7}	6
Q	(United States) Aspen Schuman	0	2
2	(United Kingdom) Hannah Klugman	6	6

Second round
5	(Germany) J Stusek	6	4	6
(Japan) R Goto	4	6	2
WC	(United States) W Newman	3	7^{7}	6
(Australia) T Kokkinis	6	6^{4}	4
16	(United States) T Frodin	2	1
(Czech Republic) J Paštiková	6	6
(India) M Rajeshwaran Revathi	7^{7}	4	3
2	(United Kingdom) H Klugman	6^{1}	6	6

Third round
5	(Germany) J Stusek	6	6
WC	(United States) W Newman	4	3
(Czech Republic) J Paštiková	6	3	4
2	(United Kingdom) H Klugman	1	6	6

Quarterfinals
5	(Germany) J Stusek	3	2
2	(United Kingdom) H Klugman	6	6

== Qualifying ==
=== Seeds ===
1. (United States) Capucine Jauffret (qualifying competition)
2. (Spain) Eugenia Zozaya Menendez (qualified)
3. (Sweden) Lea Nilsson (qualified)
4. (United States) Ishika Ashar (first round)
5. (United States) Aspen Schuman (qualified)
6. (Serbia) Lana Virc (qualified)
7. (Czech Republic) Tereza Hermanová (qualifying competition)
8. (France) Daphnée Mpetshi Perricard (qualified)
9. (France) Margot Phanthala (qualifying competition)
10. (United Kingdom) Ruby Cooling (qualified)
11. (Jamaica) Alyssa James (qualifying competition)
12. (Sweden) Iva Marinković (first round)
13. (United States) Raya Kotseva (qualifying competition)
14. (United States) Chukwumelije Clarke (first round)
15. (China) Wei Zhangqian (qualified)
16. (Japan) Riyo Yoshida (qualified)

=== Qualifiers ===
1. (China) Wei Zhangqian
2. (Spain) Eugenia Zozaya Menendez
3. (Sweden) Lea Nilsson
4. (United Kingdom) Ruby Cooling
5. (United States) Aspen Schuman
6. (Serbia) Lana Virc
7. (Japan) Riyo Yoshida
8. (France) Daphnée Mpetshi Perricard

=== Draw ===
==== First qualifier ====
First round
1	(United States) Capucine Jauffret	6	6
WC	(United States) Olivia de los Reyes	3	1
(United States) Jordyn Hazelitt	6	1	[4]
15	(China) Wei Zhangqian	3	6	[10]

Qualifying competition
1	(United States) Capucine Jauffret	6^{3}	3
15	(China) Wei Zhangqian	7^{7}	6

==== Second qualifier ====
First round
2	(Spain) Eugenia Zozaya Menéndez	6	6
WC	(United States) Sena Yoon	3	4
(United States) Isabelle Thi Deluccia	6	2	[10]
12	(Sweden) Iva Marinković	2	6	[8]

Qualifying competition
2	(Spain) Eugenia Zozaya Menéndez	6	7
(United States) Isabelle Thi Deluccia	3	5

==== Third qualifier ====
First round
3	(Sweden) Lea Nilsson	5	6	[10]
(United States) Ireland O'Brien	7	1	[7]
(South Africa) Jahnie van Zyl	0	6	[11]
14	(United States) Chukwumelije Clark	6	4	[9]

Qualifying competition
3	(Sweden) Lea Nilsson	6	6
(South Africa) Jahnie van Zyl	3	3

==== Fourth qualifier ====
First round
4	(United States) Ishika Ashar	4	1
(United States) Thara Gowda	6	6
WC	(United States) Caroline Shao	2	6	[7]
10	(United Kingdom) Ruby Cooling	6	4	[10]

Qualifying competition
(United States) Thara Gowda	2	3
10	(United Kingdom) Ruby Cooling	6	6

==== Fifth qualifier ====
First round
5	(United States) Aspen Schuman	6	6
(Slovakia) Yasmin Vavrová	1	1
(United States) Brooke Wallman	2	5
11	(Jamaica) Alyssa James	6	7

Qualifying competition
5	(United States) Aspen Schuman	6	6
11	(Jamaica) Alyssa James	2	2

==== Sixth qualifier ====
First round
6	(Serbia) Lana Virc	3	6	[10]
(United States) Claire Ahn	6	4	[3]
(United States) Emery Combs	6	6^{1}	[6]
9	(France) Margot Phanthala	1	7^{7}	[10]

Qualifying competition
6	(Serbia) Lana Virc	2	6	[10]
9	(France) Margot Phanthala	6	3	[5]

==== Seventh qualifier ====
First round
7	(Czech Republic) Tereza Hermanová	6	6
(United States) Ligaya Murray	1	3
WC	(United States) Anya Arora	2	6^{2}
16	(Japan) Riyo Yoshida	6	7^{7}

Qualifying competition
7	(Czech Republic) Tereza Hermanová	3	5
16	(Japan) Riyo Yoshida	6	7

==== Eighth qualifier ====
First round
8	(France) Daphnée Mpetshi Perricard	6	7^{7}
(United States) Margaret Sohns	4	6^{4}
WC	(Japan) Kurea Hayasaka	6	6^{2}	[8]
13	(United States) Raya Kotseva	1	7^{7}	[10]

Qualifying competition
8	(France) Daphnée Mpetshi Perricard	6	4	[10]
13	(United States) Raya Kotseva	2	6	[5]
