= 2025 US Open – Wheelchair men's singles =

Tennis championship

Wheelchair men's singles
- 2025 US Open

Final
- Champion: (Japan) Tokito Oda
- Runner-up: (Argentina) Gustavo Fernández
- Score: 6–2, 3–6, 7–6^{(13–11)}
- Date: September 6, 2025

Details
- Draw: 16
- Seeds: 4

Events
Singles	men	women		boys	girls
Doubles	men	women	mixed	boys	girls
WC Singles	men	women	quad	boys	girls
WC Doubles	men	women	quad	boys	girls
- US Open

Tokito Oda defeated Gustavo Fernández in the final, 6–2, 3–6, 7–6^{(13–11)} to win the men's singles wheelchair tennis title at the 2025 US Open. It was his seventh major singles title, completing the career Grand Slam and career Golden Slam in men’s singles wheelchair tennis.

Alfie Hewett was the two-time defending champion, but lost in the semifinals to Fernández.

There was no edition of the event in 2024 due to a scheduling conflict with the 2024 Summer Paralympics.

== Seeds ==
1. (Japan) Tokito Oda (champion)
2. (United Kingdom) Alfie Hewett (semifinals)
3. (Spain) Martín de la Puente (semifinals)
4. (Argentina) Gustavo Fernández (final)

== Draw ==
Key

- Q = Qualifier
- WC = Wild card
- LL = Lucky loser
- Alt = Alternate
- ITF = ITF entry
- PR = Protected ranking
- SR = Special ranking
- SE = Special exempt
- JE = Junior exempt
- JR = Junior Accelerator Programme entrant
- CO = College Accelerator Programme entrant
- NG = Next Gen Accelerator Program entrant
- w/o = Walkover
- r = Retired
- d = Defaulted

=== Draw ===
First round
1	(Japan) Tokito Oda	6	6
(United States) Casey Ratzlaff	1	0
(Israel) Sergei Lysov	4	6	6
WC	(United States) Conner Stroud	6	4	3
3	(Spain) Martín de la Puente	6	7
(China) Ji Zhenxu	4	5
(Spain) Daniel Caverzaschi	6^{4}	6	1
(United Kingdom) Gordon Reid	7^{7}	4	6
(Netherlands) Ruben Spaargaren	3	6	6
(Brazil) Daniel Rodrigues	6	2	1
(France) Stéphane Houdet	6^{4}	2
4	(Argentina) Gustavo Fernández	7^{7}	6
(Netherlands) Tom Egberink	6	5	7
(Japan) Takuya Miki	1	7	5
WC	(United States) Charlie Cooper	0	2
2	(United Kingdom) Alfie Hewett	6	6

Quarterfinals
1	(Japan) T Oda	6	6
(Israel) S Lysov	3	2
3	(Spain) M de la Puente	6	6
(United Kingdom) G Reid	2	3
(Netherlands) R Spaargaren	1	2
4	(Argentina) G Fernández	6	6
(Netherlands) T Egberink	2	3
2	(United Kingdom) A Hewett	6	6

Semifinals
1	(Japan) T Oda	6	6
3	(Spain) M de la Puente	3	3
4	(Argentina) G Fernández	6^{4}	6	7
2	(United Kingdom) A Hewett	7^{7}	1	5

Final
1	(Japan) T Oda	6	3	7^{13}
4	(Argentina) G Fernández	2	6	6^{11}
