= 2025 US Open – Wheelchair men's doubles =

Tennis championship

Wheelchair men's doubles
- 2025 US Open

Final
- Champions: (Argentina) Gustavo Fernández (Japan) Tokito Oda
- Runners-up: (United Kingdom) Alfie Hewett (United Kingdom) Gordon Reid
- Score: 6–1, 2–6, [10–6]
- Date: September 5, 2025

Details
- Draw: 8
- Seeds: 2

Events
Singles	men	women		boys	girls
Doubles	men	women	mixed	boys	girls
WC Singles	men	women	quad	boys	girls
WC Doubles	men	women	quad	boys	girls
- US Open

Gustavo Fernández and Tokito Oda defeated Alfie Hewett and Gordon Reid in the final, 6–1, 2–6, [10–6] to win the men's doubles wheelchair tennis title at the 2025 US Open.

Stéphane Houdet and Takashi Sanada were the reigning champions, but Sanada did not participate this year. Houdet partnered Takuya Miki, but lost in the semifinals to Hewett and Reid.

There was no edition of the event in 2024 due to a scheduling conflict with the 2024 Summer Paralympics.

== Seeds ==
1. (United Kingdom) Alfie Hewett / (United Kingdom) Gordon Reid (final)
2. (Spain) Martín de la Puente / (Netherlands) Ruben Spaargaren (quarterfinals)

== Draw ==
Key

- Q = Qualifier
- WC = Wild card
- LL = Lucky loser
- Alt = Alternate
- ITF = ITF entry
- PR = Protected ranking
- SR = Special ranking
- SE = Special exempt
- JE = Junior exempt
- JR = Junior Accelerator Programme entrant
- CO = College Accelerator Programme entrant
- NG = Next Gen Accelerator Program entrant
- w/o = Walkover
- r = Retired
- d = Defaulted

=== Finals ===
Quarterfinals
1	(United Kingdom) Alfie Hewett (United Kingdom) Gordon Reid	6	6
(United States) Charlie Cooper (United States) Conner Stroud	0	1
(France) Stéphane Houdet (Japan) Takuya Miki	6	4	[10]
(China) Ji Zhenxu (United States) Casey Ratzlaff	2	6	[7]
(Israel) Sergei Lysov (Brazil) Daniel Rodrigues	2	1
(Spain) Daniel Caverzaschi (Netherlands) Tom Egberink	6	6
(Argentina) Gustavo Fernández (Japan) Tokito Oda	1	6	[10]
2	(Spain) Martín de la Puente (Netherlands) Ruben Spaargaren	6	3	[2]

Semifinals
1	(United Kingdom) Alfie Hewett (United Kingdom) Gordon Reid	6	6
(France) Stéphane Houdet (Japan) Takuya Miki	2	0
(Spain) Daniel Caverzaschi (Netherlands) Tom Egberink	1	1
(Argentina) Gustavo Fernández (Japan) Tokito Oda	6	6

Final
1	(United Kingdom) Alfie Hewett (United Kingdom) Gordon Reid	1	6	[6]
(Argentina) Gustavo Fernández (Japan) Tokito Oda	6	2	[10]
