= 2025 US Open – Wheelchair boys' doubles =

Tennis championship

Wheelchair boys' doubles
- 2025 US Open
- Final date: September 5, 2025

Final
- Champions: (United Kingdom) Ruben Harris (Austria) Maximilian Taucher
- Runners-up: (Brazil) Luiz Calixto (United States) Tomas Majetic
- Score: 6–3, 6–3

Details
- Draw: 4
- Seeds: 2

Events
Singles	men	women		boys	girls
Doubles	men	women	mixed	boys	girls
WC Singles	men	women	quad	boys	girls
WC Doubles	men	women	quad	boys	girls
- US Open

Ruben Harris and Maximilian Taucher won the Wheelchair Boys' doubles title at the 2025 US Open, defeating Luiz Calixto and Tomas Majetic 6–3, 6–3 in the final.

== Seeds ==
1. (United Kingdom) Ruben Harris / (Austria) Maximilian Taucher (champions)
2. (Belgium) Alexander Lantermann / (United States) Maximus Wong (semifinals, withdrew)

== Draw ==
Key

- Q = Qualifier
- WC = Wild card
- LL = Lucky loser
- Alt = Alternate
- ITF = ITF entry
- PR = Protected ranking
- SR = Special ranking
- SE = Special exempt
- JE = Junior exempt
- JR = Junior Accelerator Programme entrant
- CO = College Accelerator Programme entrant
- NG = Next Gen Accelerator Program entrant
- w/o = Walkover
- r = Retired
- d = Defaulted

=== Finals ===
Semifinals
1	(United Kingdom) Ruben Harris (Austria) Maximilian Taucher	6	6
(United Kingdom) Lucas John De Gouveia (Japan) Ryota Kawada	1	2
(Brazil) Luiz Calixto (United States) Tomas Majetic	w/o
2	(Belgium) Alexander Lantermann (United States) Maximus Wong

Final
1	(United Kingdom) Ruben Harris (Austria) Maximilian Taucher	6	6
(Brazil) Luiz Calixto (United States) Tomas Majetic	3	3
