= Li Xiaohui (tennis) =

Chinese wheelchair tennis player

- Native name: 李晓辉
- Born: 28 September 1999 (age 26) Shijiazhuang, China
- Plays: Right-handed (one-handed backhand)

Singles
- Career titles: 10
- Highest ranking: No. 5 (17 March 2025)

Grand Slam singles results
- Australian Open: W (2026)
- French Open: SF (2025)
- Wimbledon: SF (2025)
- US Open: F (2025)

Other tournaments
- Paralympic Games: QF (2024)

Doubles
- Career titles: 11
- Highest ranking: No. 3 (17 March 2025)

Grand Slam doubles results
- Australian Open: W (2025, 2026)
- French Open: F (2025)
- Wimbledon: W (2025)
- US Open: W (2025)

Li Xiaohui (Chinese: 李晓辉; pinyin: Lǐ Xiǎo Huī; born 28 September 1999) is a Chinese wheelchair tennis player. She is current world number five in singles and world number three in doubles as of March 2025. She is the champion in the wheelchair doubles at the 2025 Australian Open with her teammate Wang Ziying, they were the first all-Chinese pair to win a Grand Slam title in the wheelchair doubles.

In 2024, Li ended Diede de Groot's 145-match winning streak at the BNP Paribas World Team Cup where China won their second World Team Cup title in Antalya.

== Career statistics ==
=== Wheelchair singles ===
Key
W	F	SF	QF	#R	RR	Q#	DNQ	A	NH

(W) winner; (F) finalist; (SF) semifinalist; (QF) quarterfinalist; (#R) rounds 4, 3, 2, 1; (RR) round-robin stage; (Q#) qualification round; (DNQ) did not qualify; (A) absent; (NH) not held; (SR) strike rate (events won / competed); (W–L) win–loss record.

Tournament	2024	2025	2026	Career SR
Australian Open	QF	SF	W	1 / 3
French Open	1R	SF	SF	0 / 3
Wimbledon	QF	SF	SF	0 / 3
US Open	NH	F	1R	0 / 2

==== Wheelchair doubles ====
Tournament	2024	2025	2026	Career SR
Australian Open	QF	W	W	2 / 3
French Open	QF	F	SF	0 / 3
Wimbledon	SF	W	F	1 / 3
US Open	NH	W		1 / 1

=== Grand Slam Finals ===
==== Wheelchair singles: 2 finals (1 title, 1 runner up) ====
Result	Year	Championship	Surface	Opponent	Score
Loss	2025	US Open	Hard	(Japan) Yui Kamiji	6–0, 1–6, 3–6
Win	2026	Australian Open	Hard	(Netherlands) Diede de Groot	6–1, 6–2

==== Wheelchair doubles: 5 finals (4 titles, 1 runner up) ====
Result	Year	Championship	Surface	Partner	Opponents	Score
Win	2025	Australian Open	Hard	(China) Wang Ziying	(Japan) Manami Tanaka (China) Zhu Zhenzhen	6–2, 6–3
Loss	2025	French Open	Clay	(China) Wang Ziying	(Japan) Yui Kamiji (South Africa) Kgothatso Montjane	6–4, 5–7, [7–10]
Win	2025	Wimbledon	Grass	(China) Wang Ziying	(Colombia) Angélica Bernal (France) Ksénia Chasteau	6–3, 6–1
Win	2025	US Open	Hard	(China) Wang Ziying	(Netherlands) Diede de Groot (China) Zhu Zhenzhen	6–4, 7–6^{(7–4)}
Win	2026	Australian Open	Hard	(China) Wang Ziying	(Japan) Yui Kamiji (China) Zhu Zhenzhen	6–4, 6–3
Loss	2026	Wimbledon	Grass	(China) Wang Ziying	(Japan) Yui Kamiji (China) Zhu Zhenzhen	4–6, 5–7
