= 2025 US Open – Boys' doubles =

Tennis championship

Boys' doubles
- 2025 US Open

Final
- Champions: (United States) Keaton Hance (United States) Jack Kennedy
- Runners-up: (United States) Noah Johnston (United States) Benjamin Willwerth
- Score: 6–3, 1–6, [10–8]
- Date: September 6, 2025

Details
- Draw: 32
- Seeds: 8

Events
Singles	men	women		boys	girls
Doubles	men	women	mixed	boys	girls
WC Singles	men	women	quad	boys	girls
WC Doubles	men	women	quad	boys	girls
- US Open

Keaton Hance and Jack Kennedy won the boys' doubles title at the 2025 US Open, defeating Noah Johnston and Benjamin Willwerth in the final, 6–3, 1–6, [10–8].

Maxim Mrva and Rei Sakamoto were the reigning champions, but Mrva chose not to participate and Sakamoto was no longer eligible to compete in junior events.

== Seeds ==
1. (Romania) Yannick Theodor Alexandrescou / (Japan) Ryo Tabata (first round)
2. (Germany) Niels McDonald / (Germany) Max Schönhaus (quarterfinals)
3. (Finland) Oskari Paldanius / (Poland) Alan Ważny (first round)
4. Timofei Derepasko / (Bulgaria) Alexander Vasilev (second round)
5. (Brazil) Luis Guto Miguel / (Spain) Andrés Santamarta Roig (first round, withdrew)
6. (United States) Keaton Hance / (United States) Jack Kennedy (champions)
7. (United States) Noah Johnston / (United States) Benjamin Willwerth (final)
8. (Ukraine) Nikita Bilozertsev / (Slovenia) Žiga Šeško (first round)

== Draw ==
Key

- Q = Qualifier
- WC = Wild card
- LL = Lucky loser
- Alt = Alternate
- ITF = ITF entry
- PR = Protected ranking
- SR = Special ranking
- SE = Special exempt
- JE = Junior exempt
- JR = Junior Accelerator Programme entrant
- CO = College Accelerator Programme entrant
- NG = Next Gen Accelerator Program entrant
- w/o = Walkover
- r = Retired
- d = Defaulted

=== Finals ===
Semifinals
7	(United States) Noah Johnston (United States) Benjamin Willwerth	7	4	[10]
(Germany) Jamie Mackenzie (United States) Dominick Mosejczuk	5	6	[6]
6	(United States) Keaton Hance (United States) Jack Kennedy	6	6
(Puerto Rico) Yannik Álvarez (United States) Jack Secord	2	4

Final
7	(United States) Noah Johnston (United States) Benjamin Willwerth	3	6	[8]
6	(United States) Keaton Hance (United States) Jack Kennedy	6	1	[10]

=== Top half ===
First round
1	(Romania) Yannick Theodor Alexandrescou (Japan) Ryo Tabata	6^{4}	7^{7}	[8]
(Morocco) Karim Bennani (Sweden) William Rejchtman Vinciguerra	7^{7}	6^{5}	[10]
WC	(United States) Andrew Johnson (United States) Marcel Latak	2	3
(Italy) Gabriele Crivellaro (Italy) Michele Mecarelli	6	6
(Brazil) Pedro Henrique Chabalgoity (United States) Tanishk Konduri	4	4
(Romania) Ștefan Horia Haita (Finland) Linus Lagerbohm	6	6
(Chinese Taipei) Chen Kuan-hsou (India) Kriish Tyagi	4	7^{7}	[11]
7	(United States) Noah Johnston (United States) Benjamin Willwerth	6	6^{4}	[13]
3	(Finland) Oskari Paldanius (Poland) Alan Ważny	6^{11}	4
Alt	(United States) Ford McCollum (United States) Nischal Spurling	7^{13}	6
(United States) Ryan Cozad (United States) Gavin Goode	6	3	[12]
(Germany) Jamie Mackenzie (United States) Dominick Mosejczuk	1	6	[14]
Savva Rybkin (Romania) Matei Todoran	7^{10}	6
(United States) Izyan Ahmad (United States) Simon Caldwell	6^{8}	4
(United States) Ronit Karki (United States) Jack Satterfield	w/o
5	(Brazil) Luis Guto Miguel (Spain) Andrés Santamarta Roig

Second round
(Morocco) K Bennani (Sweden) W Rejchtman Vinciguerra	7^{7}	3	[9]
(Italy) G Crivellaro (Italy) M Mecarelli	6^{3}	6	[11]
(Romania) ȘH Haita (Finland) L Lagerbohm	4	5
7	(United States) N Johnston (United States) B Willwerth	6	7
Alt	(United States) F McCollum (United States) N Spurling	6^{6}	6	[5]
(Germany) J Mackenzie (United States) D Mosejczuk	7^{8}	4	[10]
S Rybkin (Romania) M Todoran	3	6	[5]
(United States) R Karki (United States) J Satterfield	6	4	[10]

Quarterfinals
(Italy) G Crivellaro (Italy) M Mecarelli	1	6^{5}
7	(United States) N Johnston (United States) B Willwerth	6	7^{7}
(Germany) J Mackenzie (United States) D Mosejczuk	7^{7}	6
(United States) R Karki (United States) J Satterfield	6^{5}	3

Semifinals
7	(United States) N Johnston (United States) B Willwerth	7	4	[10]
(Germany) J Mackenzie (United States) D Mosejczuk	5	6	[6]

=== Bottom half ===
First round
6	(United States) Keaton Hance (United States) Jack Kennedy	6^{4}	6	[10]
(Sweden) Ludvig Hede (Netherlands) Hidde Schoenmakers	7^{7}	4	[6]
(Romania) Tudor Batin (Norway) Johan Oscar Lien	7^{7}	6
(Brazil) João Pedro Didoni Bonini (Argentina) Dante Pagani	6^{2}	1
(United States) Maxwell Exsted (Czech Republic) Jan Kumstát	7^{7}	3	[9]
WC	(United States) Michael Antonius (United States) Matisse Farzam	6^{2}	6	[11]
(India) Hitesh Chauhan (Spain) Tito Chávez	1	4
4	Timofei Derepasko (Bulgaria) Alexander Vasilev	6	6
8	(Ukraine) Nikita Bilozertsev (Slovenia) Žiga Šeško	3	4
(Canada) Nicolas Arseneault (Australia) Cruz Hewitt	6	6
WC	(United States) Shaan Majeed (Canada) Lucas Smith	4	6	[6]
(Puerto Rico) Yannik Álvarez (United States) Jack Secord	6	2	[10]
(Colombia) Alejandro Arcila (United States) Maximus Dussault	6^{6}	6	[8]
(Kazakhstan) Zangar Nurlanuly (Kazakhstan) Damir Zhalgasbay	7^{8}	4	[10]
WC	(United States) Vihaan Reddy (United States) Roshan Santhosh	3	1
2	(Germany) Niels McDonald (Germany) Max Schönhaus	6	6

Second round
6	(United States) K Hance (United States) J Kennedy	6	6
(Romania) T Batin (Norway) JO Lien	0	3
WC	(United States) M Antonius (United States) M Farzam	7^{7}	7^{7}
4	T Derepasko (Bulgaria) A Vasilev	6^{4}	6^{5}
(Canada) N Arseneault (Australia) C Hewitt	6	3	[7]
(Puerto Rico) Y Álvarez (United States) J Secord	3	6	[10]
(Kazakhstan) Z Nurlanuly (Kazakhstan) D Zhalgasbay
2	(Germany) N McDonald (Germany) M Schönhaus	w/o

Quarterfinals
6	(United States) K Hance (United States) J Kennedy	6	6
WC	(United States) M Antonius (United States) M Farzam	2	4
(Puerto Rico) Y Álvarez (United States) J Secord	6	6
2	(Germany) N McDonald (Germany) M Schönhaus	4	3

Semifinals
6	(United States) K Hance (United States) J Kennedy	6	6
(Puerto Rico) Y Álvarez (United States) J Secord	2	4
