= Sonja Zhenikhova =

German tennis player (born 2008)

- Country (sports): Germany
- Born: 21 May 2008 (age 18) Berlin, Germany
- Height: 1.72 m (5 ft 8 in)
- Plays: Right (two-handed backhand)
- Prize money: $29,152

Singles
- Career record: 44–43
- Career titles: 1 ITF
- Highest ranking: No. 674 (2 November 2026)
- Current ranking: No. 680 (16 November 2026)

Grand Slam singles results
- Australian Open Junior: 2R (2025)
- French Open Junior: 2R (2025)
- Wimbledon Junior: 3R (2024)
- US Open Junior: 1R (2024, 2025)

Doubles
- Career record: 33–23
- Career titles: 2 ITF
- Highest ranking: No. 432 (6 April 2026)
- Current ranking: No. 656 (16 November 2026)

Grand Slam doubles results
- Australian Open Junior: 1R (2025)
- French Open Junior: W (2025)
- Wimbledon Junior: 1R (2024, 2025)
- US Open Junior: SF (2025)
- Last updated on: 17 November 2026.

Sonja Zhenikhova (born 21 May 2008) is a German tennis player. She has a career-high singles ranking by the WTA of No. 674, achieved on 2 November 2026, and a best doubles ranking of No. 432, attained on 6 April 2026. She and Eva Bennemann won the girls' doubles title at the 2025 French Open.

== Early life ==
Zhenikhova was born in Berlin. She plays for TK Blau-Gold Steglitz in Berlin.

== Career ==
=== Juniors ===
In June 2023, Zhenikhova won the J300 ITF German Juniors in Bamberg as a wildcard, defeating Eliška Forejtková in the final. That August, she and Barbara Straszewska reached the doubles final of the J100 Grand Prix W.Fibak in Poznań, but lost to Brooke Black and Martyna Mackiewicz in the final. In October, she and compatriot Julia Stusek reached the doubles quarterfinals of the U16 European Junior Championships in Parma.

In April 2025, she reached the final of the J500 International HTV Junior Open in Offenbach, but lost to fellow German Julia Stusek. At the French Open, she and compatriot Eva Bennemann won the girls' doubles title, upsetting the top-seeded team of Emerson Jones and Hannah Klugman in the first round and defeating sisters Alena and Jana Kovačková in the final.

=== Professional ===
In April 2025, Zhenikhova won her first pro title at the W15 Antalya Series, defeating Gaia Maduzzi in the final.

In July 2025, she made her WTA Tour main-draw debut at the Hamburg Open in doubles, partnering Tessa Johanna Brockmann, after being handed wildcards.

== ITF Circuit finals ==
=== Singles: 3 (1 title, 2 runner-ups) ===
Legend W15 tournaments (1–2)	Finals by surface Clay (1–2)

Result	W–L	Date	Tournament	Tier	Surface	Opponent	Score
Win	1–0	Apr 2025	ITF Antalya, Turkey	W15	Clay	(Italy) Gaia Maduzzi	6–1, 4–6, 6–3
Loss	1–1	Sep 2026	ITF Varna, Bulgaria	W15	Clay	(Romania) Giulia Safina Popa	2–6, 3–6
Loss	1–2	Oct 2026	ITF Bol, Croatia	W15	Clay	(United States) Mia Horvit	3–6, 0–6

=== Doubles: 5 (2 titles, 3 runner-ups) ===
Legend W50 tournaments (0–1) W15 tournaments (2–2)	Finals by surface Hard (1–0) Clay (1–3)

Result	W–L	Date	Tournament	Tier	Surface	Partner	Opponents	Score
Win	1–0	Sep 2025	ITF Radom, Poland	W15	Clay	(Poland) Maja Pawelska	(United States) Mia Horvit (United States) Malkia Ngounoue	6–3, 7–6^{(7–4)}
Win	2–0	Nov 2025	ITF Marsa, Malta	W15	Hard	(Serbia) Anja Stanković	(Czech Republic) Julie Jiráková (Malta) Emma Montebello	7–6^{(7–4)}, 6–4
Loss	2–1	May 2026	ITF Szentendre, Hungary	W15	Clay	(Germany) Valentina Steiner	(Argentina) Ana Gobbi Monllau (Colombia) Mariana Higuita	6–0, 4–6, [7–10]
Loss	2–2	Jun 2026	ITF Kamen, Germany	W15	Clay	(Chile) Camila Rodero	(Germany) Josy Daems (Ukraine) Anastasiia Firman	6–1, 3–6, [5–10]
Loss	2–3	Oct 2026	ITF Burgas, Bulgaria	W50	Clay	(Romania) Maia Ilinca Burcescu	(Czech Republic) Alena Kovačková (Czech Republic) Jana Kovačková	4–6, 5–7

== Junior Grand Slam tournament finals ==
=== Doubles: 1 (title) ===
Result	Year	Tournament	Surface	Partner	Opponents	Score
Win	2025	French Open	Clay	(Germany) Eva Bennemann	(Czech Republic) Alena Kovačková (Czech Republic) Jana Kovačková	4–6, 6–4, [10–8]
