= Jana Kovačková =

Czech tennis player (born 2010)

- Country (sports): Czech Republic
- Born: 13 June 2010 (age 16) Trutnov, Czech Republic
- Plays: Right (two-handed backhand)
- Prize money: US$ 41,469

Singles
- Career record: 45–16
- Career titles: 3 ITF
- Highest ranking: No. 428 (31 August 2026)
- Current ranking: No. 442 (14 September 2026)

Grand Slam singles results
- Australian Open Junior: 3R (2025)
- French Open Junior: SF (2026)
- Wimbledon Junior: 3R (2026)
- US Open Junior: SF (2026)

Doubles
- Career record: 34–5
- Career titles: 8 ITF
- Highest ranking: No. 205 (14 September 2026)
- Current ranking: No. 205 (14 September 2026)

Grand Slam doubles results
- Australian Open Junior: W (2026)
- French Open Junior: W (2026)
- Wimbledon Junior: W (2026)
- US Open Junior: W (2025)
- Last updated on: 16 September 2026.

Jana Kovačková (born 13 June 2010) is a Czech tennis player. She has a career-high WTA singles ranking of No. 428, achieved on 31 August 2026 and a doubles ranking of No. 205, reached on 14 September 2026.

Kovačková has won all four junior major titles in girls' doubles, winning all four in consecutive tournaments, two with her sister Alena Kovačková and two with compatriot Kateřina Zajíčková, the first player to complete a non-calendar-year Grand Slam in girls doubles.

== Career ==
=== Juniors ===
A member of TK Sparta Prague, she was part of the Czech U14 World Team Championships winning side with a 2–1 win against the United States alongside Kateřina Zajíčková and Laura Chlumská in 2024. Kovačková won the girls' U14 title at the 2024 Wimbledon. In the 2024 season, she was the most successful player on the ITF Junior Circuit, with a total of 17 titles combined, eight in singles and nine in doubles.

Kovačková played in the girls' doubles event at the 2025 Australian Open, with her sister Alena. Playing as a pair, they reached the semifinals, losing to twin sisters Kristina and Annika Penickova. The Czech sisters paired up again to play at the 2025 French Open, and they defeated Penickova sisters in the semifinals, winning on a match tiebreak. In the final, they lost to German pair Eva Bennemann and Sonja Zhenikhova.

The Czech sisters reached 2025 the semifinals of another major, at Wimbledon, losing to eighth- seeded and eventual champions, Kristina Penickova and Vendula Valdmannová. Later that season, Kovačková and her sister were crowned champions at a major, winning the girls' doubles at the 2025 US Open. The Czech pair defeated fourth seeds Laima Vladson and Jeline Vandromme, in straight sets.

Partnering again with her sister, Kovačková won her second girls' doubles title at the 2026 Australian Open. The pair did not drop a set on their run and defeated Tereza Heřmanová and Denisa Žoldáková in a first all-Czech junior final.

She reached an ITF junior combined ranking of world No. 8 on 19 January 2026. In June 2026, she reached the final of the girls' doubles at the 2026 French Open playing alongside fellow-Czech player Kateřina Zajíčková, with the pair losing just 17 games across the five matches.

Alongside Zajíčková, she also won the girls' doubles at the 2026 Wimbledon Championships, the following month, for her fourth consecutive junior major doubles title. Kovačková joked after the final that "I'll probably start playing only doubles and not singles, they're useless". She had been the third seed in the girls' singles, but was defeated in the round-of-16. In doing so, she became the first player to complete a non-calendar-year Grand Slam in girls doubles.

=== Professional ===
In February 2025, Kovačková reached her first ITF final at the W15 event in Sharm El Sheikh, Egypt, losing to Bulgarian player Isabella Shinikova. Two months later, she won her first singles title at a W35 tournament in Antalya, Türkiye, defeating Denislava Glushkova of Bulgaria in straight sets.

Kovačková also won three W15 doubles titles with her sister.

== Personal life ==
Kovačková's father, Petr Kovačka, was a tennis player. She has an older sister, Alena, who is also a tennis player.

== ITF Circuit finals ==
=== Singles: 6 (3 titles, 3 runner-ups) ===
Legend W50 tournaments (1–0) W35 tournaments (1–0) W15 tournaments (1–3)	Finals by surface Hard (1–2) Clay (2–1)

Result	W–L	Date	Tournament	Tier	Surface	Opponent	Score
Loss	0–1	Feb 2025	ITF Sharm El Sheikh, Egypt	W15	Hard	(Bulgaria) Isabella Shinikova	6–3, 0–6, 6–7^{(7–9)}
Win	1–1	Apr 2025	ITF Antalya, Turkiye	W35	Clay	(Bulgaria) Denislava Glushkova	6–0, 6–1
Loss	1–2	Apr 2025	ITF Antalya, Turkiye	W15	Clay	Ekaterina Reyngold	2–6, 2–6
Win	2–2	Sep 2025	ITF Monastir, Tunisia	W15	Hard	(United States) Carolyn Ansari	7–6^{(7–5)}, 6–3
Loss	2–3	Oct 2025	ITF Sharm El Sheikh	W15	Hard	Kristina Kroitor	2–6, 6–7^{(3–7)}
Win	3–3	Aug 2026	Prague Open, Czech Republic	W50	Clay	(China) Gao Xinyu	6–1, 6–1

=== Doubles: 9 (9 titles) ===
Legend W75 tournaments (2–0) W50 tournaments (3–0) W35 tournaments (1–0) W15 tournaments (3–0)	Finals by surface Hard (3–0) Clay (6–0)

Result	W–L	Date	Tournament	Tier	Surface	Partner	Opponents	Score
Win	1–0	Apr 2025	ITF Antalya, Turkiye	W15	Clay	(Czech Republic) Alena Kovačková	(Romania) Ștefania Bojică (Czech Republic) Linda Ševčíková	5–7, 6–4, [10–4]
Win	2–0	Aug 2025	ITF Monastir, Tunisia	W15	Hard	(Czech Republic) Alena Kovačková	(Bulgaria) Iva Ivanova (Belgium) Jeline Vandromme	7–5, 6–2
Win	3–0	Aug 2025	ITF Monastir, Tunisia (2)	W15	Hard	(Czech Republic) Alena Kovačková	(France) Yasmine Mansouri (Serbia) Elena Milovanović	7–6^{(7–2)}, 6–4
Win	4–0	Feb 2026	Prague Open, Czech Republic	W75	Hard (i)	(Czech Republic) Alena Kovačková	(United Kingdom) Madeleine Brooks (United Kingdom) Amelia Rajecki	6–4, 6–3
Win	5–0	Mar 2026	ITF Heraklion, Greece	W50	Clay	(Czech Republic) Alena Kovačková	(Bulgaria) Rositsa Dencheva (Italy) Vittoria Paganetti	6–4, 6–3
Win	6–0	Apr 2026	ITF Santa Margherita di Pula, Italy	W35	Clay	(Czech Republic) Alena Kovačková	(Italy) Deborah Chiesa (Malta) Francesca Curmi	6–1, 6–3
Win	7–0	Jun 2026	Macha Lake Open, Czech Republic	W75	Clay	(Czech Republic) Alena Kovačková	(United States) Hibah Shaikh (United States) Allura Zamarripa	6–4, 6–1
Win	8–0	Aug 2026	Prague Open, Czech Republic	W50	Clay	(Czech Republic) Alena Kovačková	(Ukraine) Valeriya Strakhova; Anastasia Tikhonova	6–2, 6–3
Win	9–0	Oct 2026	ITF Burgas, Bulgaria	W50	Clay	(Czech Republic) Alena Kovačková	(Romania) Maia Ilinca Burcescu (Germany) Sonja Zhenikhova	6–4, 7–5

== Junior Grand Slam tournament finals ==
=== Doubles: 5 (4 titles, 1 runner-up) ===
Result	Year	Tournament	Surface	Partner	Opponents	Score
Loss	2025	French Open	Clay	(Czech Republic) Alena Kovačková	(Germany) Eva Bennemann (Germany) Sonja Zhenikhova	6–4, 4–6, [8–10]
Win	2025	US Open	Hard	(Czech Republic) Alena Kovačková	(Lithuania) Laima Vladson (Belgium) Jeline Vandromme	6–2, 6–2
Win	2026	Australian Open	Hard	(Czech Republic) Alena Kovačková	(Czech Republic) Tereza Heřmanová (Czech Republic) Denisa Žoldáková	6–1, 6–3
Win	2026	French Open	Clay	(Czech Republic) Kateřina Zajíčková	(United States) Jordyn Hazelitt (United States) Welles Newman	6–1, 6–4
Win	2026	Wimbledon	Grass	(Czech Republic) Kateřina Zajíčková	(Brazil) Victoria Luiza Barros (Brazil) Nauhany Vitória Leme da Silva	7–6^{(9–7)}, 6–7^{(5–7)}, [10–6]
