= 2025 US Open – Girls' doubles =

Tennis championship

Girls' doubles
- 2025 US Open
- Final date: September 6, 2025

Final
- Champions: (Czech Republic) Alena Kovačková (Czech Republic) Jana Kovačková
- Runners-up: (Belgium) Jeline Vandromme (Lithuania) Laima Vladson
- Score: 6–2, 6–2

Details
- Draw: 32
- Seeds: 8

Events
Singles	men	women		boys	girls
Doubles	men	women	mixed	boys	girls
WC Singles	men	women	quad	boys	girls
WC Doubles	men	women	quad	boys	girls
- US Open

Alena and Jana Kovačková won the girls' doubles title at the 2025 US Open, defeating Jeline Vandromme and Laima Vladson in the final, 6–2, 6–2.

Malak El Allami and Emily Sartz-Lunde were the reigning champions, but were no longer eligible to compete in junior events.

== Seeds ==
1. (United Kingdom) Hannah Klugman / (Slovakia) Mia Pohánková (second round)
2. (United States) Kristina Penickova / (United Kingdom) Mika Stojsavljevic (second round)
3. (Czech Republic) Alena Kovačková / (Czech Republic) Jana Kovačková (champions)
4. (Belgium) Jeline Vandromme / (Lithuania) Laima Vladson (final)
5. (Spain) Charo Esquiva Bañuls / (Sweden) Nellie Taraba Wallberg (quarterfinals)
6. (Brazil) Victoria Luiza Barros / (United States) Thea Frodin (quarterfinals)
7. (Czech Republic) Julie Paštíková / (Germany) Julia Stusek (quarterfinals)
8. (France) Ksenia Efremova / (Bulgaria) Elizara Yaneva (first round)

== Draw ==
Key

- Q = Qualifier
- WC = Wild card
- LL = Lucky loser
- Alt = Alternate
- ITF = ITF entry
- PR = Protected ranking
- SR = Special ranking
- SE = Special exempt
- JE = Junior exempt
- JR = Junior Accelerator Programme entrant
- CO = College Accelerator Programme entrant
- NG = Next Gen Accelerator Program entrant
- w/o = Walkover
- r = Retired
- d = Defaulted

=== Finals ===
Semifinals
(Thailand) Kamonwan Yodpetch (China) Zhang Ruien	7^{7}	1	[6]
4	(Belgium) Jeline Vandromme (Lithuania) Laima Vladson	6^{5}	6	[10]
3	(Czech Republic) Alena Kovačková (Czech Republic) Jana Kovačková	6	6
(Germany) Eva Bennemann (Germany) Sonja Zhenikhova	2	3

Final
4	(Belgium) Jeline Vandromme (Lithuania) Laima Vladson	2	2
3	(Czech Republic) Alena Kovačková (Czech Republic) Jana Kovačková	6	6

=== Top half ===
First round
1	(United Kingdom) Hannah Klugman (Slovakia) Mia Pohánková	6	6
(France) Daphnée Mpetshi Perricard (Spain) Eugenia Zozaya Menéndez	3	4
(United States) Isabelle Thi Deluccia (United States) Anita Tu	1	3
(Thailand) Kamonwan Yodpetch (China) Zhang Ruien	6	6
(United Kingdom) Brooke Black (Serbia) Anastasija Cvetković	1	2
(Czech Republic) Sarah Melany Fajmonová (Slovakia) Kali Šupová	6	6
(China) Shao Yushan (China) Sun Xinran	5	4
6	(Brazil) Victoria Luiza Barros (United States) Thea Frodin	7	6
4	(Belgium) Jeline Vandromme (Lithuania) Laima Vladson	6	6
(Argentina) Luna María Cinalli (India) Maaya Rajeshwaran Revathi	2	2
WC	(United States) Emery Combs (United States) Olivia De Los Reyes	6	5	[10]
(United States) Kori Montoya (Serbia) Lana Virc	4	7	[8]
(United States) Leena Friedman (Australia) Tahlia Kokkinis	0	7^{7}	[8]
(United States) Maya Iyengar (Canada) Nadia Lagaev	6	6^{4}	[10]
WC	(United States) Nancy Lee (United States) Welles Newman	3	5
7	(Czech Republic) Julie Paštíková (Germany) Julia Stusek	6	7

Second round
1	(United Kingdom) H Klugman (Slovakia) M Pohánková	6^{2}	4
(Thailand) K Yodpetch (China) R Zhang	7^{7}	6
(Czech Republic) SM Fajmonová (Slovakia) K Šupová	3	4
6	(Brazil) VL Barros (United States) T Frodin	6	6
4	(Belgium) J Vandromme (Lithuania) L Vladson	6	7^{9}
WC	(United States) E Combs (United States) O De Los Reyes	1	6^{7}
(United States) M Iyengar (Canada) N Lagaev	5	6	6^{8}
7	(Czech Republic) J Paštíková (Germany) J Stusek	7	3	7^{10}

Quarterfinals
(Thailand) K Yodpetch (China) R Zhang	6	3	[10]
6	(Brazil) VL Barros (United States) T Frodin	3	6	[7]
4	(Belgium) J Vandromme (Lithuania) L Vladson	6	6
7	(Czech Republic) J Paštíková (Germany) J Stusek	3	2

Semifinals
(Thailand) K Yodpetch (China) R Zhang	7^{7}	1	[6]
4	(Belgium) J Vandromme (Lithuania) L Vladson	6^{5}	6	[10]

=== Bottom half ===
First round
5	(Spain) Charo Esquiva Bañuls (Sweden) Nellie Taraba Wallberg	7^{7}	6
WC	(United States) Carrie-Anne Hoo (United States) Kaya Moe	6^{5}	0
(United Kingdom) Ruby Cooling (Sweden) Lea Nilsson	6	2	[10]
(Australia) Renee Alame (Romania) Maia Ilinca Burcescu	0	6	[8]
(Turkey) Deniz Dılek (Latvia) Beatrise Zeltiņa	7	6
(United Kingdom) Allegra Korpanec Davies; Ekaterina Tupitsyna	5	2
WC	(United States) Kenzie Nguyen (United States) Margaret Sohns	4	3
3	(Czech Republic) Alena Kovačková (Czech Republic) Jana Kovačková	6	6
8	(France) Ksenia Efremova (Bulgaria) Elizara Yaneva	2	2
(Germany) Eva Bennemann (Germany) Sonja Zhenikhova	6	6
(Japan) Reina Goto (Bulgaria) Yoana Konstantinova	7	6
(China) Wei Zhangqian (Japan) Riyo Yoshida	5	1
(China) Qu Yihan (Japan) Kanon Sawashiro	6	4	[10]
(United States) Capucine Jauffret (United States) Aspen Schuman	2	6	[7]
(Israel) Mika Buchnik (Argentina) Sol Ailin Larraya Guidi	2	7^{8}	[7]
2	(United States) Kristina Penickova (United Kingdom) Mika Stojsavljevic	6	6^{6}	[10]

Second round
5	(Spain) C Esquiva Bañuls (Sweden) N Taraba Wallberg	6	6
(United Kingdom) R Cooling (Sweden) L Nilsson	3	2
(Turkey) D Dılek (Latvia) B Zeltiņa	4	5
3	(Czech Republic) A Kovačková (Czech Republic) J Kovačková	6	7
(Germany) E Bennemann (Germany) S Zhenikhova	7	7
(Japan) R Goto (Bulgaria) Y Konstantinova	5	5
(China) Y Qu (Japan) K Sawashiro	6	6
2	(United States) K Penickova (United Kingdom) M Stojsavljevic	4	4

Quarterfinals
5	(Spain) C Esquiva Bañuls (Sweden) N Taraba Wallberg	6^{6}	2
3	(Czech Republic) A Kovačková (Czech Republic) J Kovačková	7^{8}	6
(Germany) E Bennemann (Germany) S Zhenikhova	6	6
(China) Y Qu (Japan) K Sawashiro	2	4

Semifinals
3	(Czech Republic) A Kovačková (Czech Republic) J Kovačková	6	6
(Germany) E Bennemann (Germany) S Zhenikhova	2	3
