= 2025 US Open – Boys' singles =

Tennis championship

Boys' singles
- 2025 US Open

Final
- Champion: (Bulgaria) Ivan Ivanov
- Runner-up: (Bulgaria) Alexander Vasilev
- Score: 7–5, 6–3
- Date: September 6, 2025

Details
- Draw: 64
- Seeds: 16

Events
Singles	men	women		boys	girls
Doubles	men	women	mixed	boys	girls
WC Singles	men	women	quad	boys	girls
WC Doubles	men	women	quad	boys	girls
- US Open

Ivan Ivanov won the boys' singles title at the 2025 US Open, defeating Alexander Vasilev, 7–5, 6–3. The match made history as the first all-Bulgarian major final ever.

Rafael Jódar was the reigning champion, but was no longer eligible to compete in junior events.

== Seeds ==
1. (Bulgaria) Ivan Ivanov (champion)
2. (Spain) Andrés Santamarta Roig (third round)
3. (Romania) Yannick Theodor Alexandrescou (first round, retired)
4. (United States) Benjamin Willwerth (second round)
5. (Bulgaria) Alexander Vasilev (final)
6. (Finland) Oskari Paldanius (third round)
7. (Germany) Niels McDonald (first round)
8. (Germany) Max Schönhaus (quarterfinals)
9. (United States) Jack Kennedy (third round)
10. (Japan) Ryo Tabata (second round)
11. (Canada) Nicolas Arseneault (first round)
12. (Poland) Alan Ważny (second round)
13. Timofei Derepasko (quarterfinals)
14. (United Kingdom) Oliver Bonding (quarterfinals)
15. (United States) Ronit Karki (third round)
16. (Brazil) João Pedro Didoni Bonini (first round)

Click on the seed number of a player to go to their draw section.

== Draw ==
Key

- Q = Qualifier
- WC = Wild card
- LL = Lucky loser
- Alt = Alternate
- ITF = ITF entry
- PR = Protected ranking
- SR = Special ranking
- SE = Special exempt
- JE = Junior exempt
- JR = Junior Accelerator Programme entrant
- CO = College Accelerator Programme entrant
- NG = Next Gen Accelerator Program entrant
- w/o = Walkover
- r = Retired
- d = Defaulted

=== Finals ===
Quarterfinals
1	(Bulgaria) Ivan Ivanov	6	0	7^{10}
8	(Germany) Max Schönhaus	4	6	6^{3}
13	Timofei Derepasko	2	4
(Kazakhstan) Zangar Nurlanuly	6	6
5	(Bulgaria) Alexander Vasilev	6	7
WC	(United States) Andrew Johnson	3	5
(Brazil) Luis Guto Miguel	7^{7}	2	6
14	(United Kingdom) Oliver Bonding	6^{5}	6	1

Semifinals
1	(Bulgaria) Ivan Ivanov	6	6
(Kazakhstan) Zangar Nurlanuly	1	4
5	(Bulgaria) Alexander Vasilev	2	6	6
(Brazil) Luis Guto Miguel	6	1	0

Final
1	(Bulgaria) Ivan Ivanov	7	6
5	(Bulgaria) Alexander Vasilev	5	3

=== Top half ===
==== Section 1 ====
First round
1	(Bulgaria) Ivan Ivanov	7	6
WC	(United States) Michael Antonius	5	1
(United States) Maxwell Exsted	6	6
(Morocco) Karim Bennani	4	4
Q	(India) Hitesh Chauhan	2	3
(United States) Maximus Dussault	6	6
(Argentina) Dante Pagani	6	6
16	(Brazil) João Pedro Didoni Bonini	2	3
10	(Japan) Ryo Tabata	6	1	7
(Sweden) William Rejchtman Vinciguerra	4	6	5
Q	(Spain) Tito Chávez	6	6
Q	(United States) Izyan Ahmad	3	4
(United States) Noah Johnston	6^{5}	6	6
(Colombia) Alejandro Arcila	7^{7}	3	0
WC	(United States) Vihaan Reddy	3	2
8	(Germany) Max Schönhaus	6	6

Second round
1	(Bulgaria) I Ivanov	6	6
(United States) M Exsted	2	3
(United States) M Dussault	6^{2}	6	6
(Argentina) D Pagani	7^{7}	2	4
10	(Japan) R Tabata	6^{3}	6	3
Q	(Spain) T Chávez	7^{7}	3	6
(United States) N Johnston	6	3	6^{4}
8	(Germany) M Schönhaus	1	6	7^{10}

Third round
1	(Bulgaria) I Ivanov	7^{7}	6
(United States) M Dussault	6^{3}	4
Q	(Spain) T Chávez	2	6	1
8	(Germany) M Schönhaus	6	4	6

Quarterfinals
1	(Bulgaria) I Ivanov	6	0	7^{10}
8	(Germany) M Schönhaus	4	6	6^{3}

==== Section 2 ====
First round
4	(United States) Benjamin Willwerth	6	6
(Australia) Cruz Hewitt	3	0
(Netherlands) Hidde Schoenmakers	6	6^{6}	6
Q	(Romania) Tudor Batin	2	7^{8}	0
(United States) Jack Satterfield	3	4
(Germany) Jamie Mackenzie	6	6
(Norway) Johan Oscar Lien	7	4	1
13	Timofei Derepasko	5	6	6
12	(Poland) Alan Ważny	6	7^{7}
(United States) Ryan Cozad	3	6^{4}
WC	(United States) Roshan Santhosh	3	3
(Kazakhstan) Zangar Nurlanuly	6	6
WC	(United States) Marcel Latak	2	3
(Italy) Michele Mecarelli	6	6
(Austria) Thilo Behrmann	3	0^{r}
6	(Finland) Oskari Paldanius	6	0

Second round
4	(United States) B Willwerth	3	6	5
(Netherlands) H Schoenmakers	6	2	7
(Germany) J Mackenzie	6^{5}	6^{5}
13	T Derepasko	7^{7}	7^{7}
12	(Poland) A Ważny	4	4
(Kazakhstan) Z Nurlanuly	6	6
(Italy) M Mecarelli	1	6	4
6	(Finland) O Paldanius	6	3	6

Third round
(Netherlands) H Schoenmakers	1	0
13	T Derepasko	6	6
(Kazakhstan) Z Nurlanuly	3	6	6
6	(Finland) O Paldanius	6	1	2

Quarterfinals
13	T Derepasko	2	4
(Kazakhstan) Z Nurlanuly	6	6

=== Bottom half ===
==== Section 3 ====
First round
5	(Bulgaria) Alexander Vasilev	6	7^{8}
WC	(United States) Tanishk Konduri	3	6^{6}
(United States) Dominick Mosejczuk	6	6
Q	(Brazil) Pedro Henrique Chabalgoity	0	3
SE	(United States) Gavin Goode	1	6	6
(Chinese Taipei) Chen Kuan-shou	6	1	1
(Czech Republic) Jan Kumstát	6	7^{7}
11	(Canada) Nicolas Arseneault	2	6^{3}
15	(United States) Ronit Karki	6	7^{7}
(Slovenia) Žiga Šeško	3	6^{4}
(Sweden) Ludvig Hede	6	6
(India) Kriish Tyagi	3	1
WC	(United States) Matisse Farzam	4	7	6
(Finland) Linus Lagerbohm	6	5	2
WC	(United States) Andrew Johnson	2	7^{7}	3
3	(Romania) Yannick Theodor Alexandrescou	6	6^{0}	0^{r}

Second round
5	(Bulgaria) A Vasilev	6	6
(United States) D Mosejczuk	3	2
SE	(United States) G Goode	2	4
(Czech Republic) J Kumstát	6	6
15	(United States) R Karki	6	3	6
(Sweden) L Hede	3	6	4
WC	(United States) M Farzam	4	5
WC	(United States) A Johnson	6	7

Third round
5	(Bulgaria) A Vasilev	7	4	7^{10}
(Czech Republic) J Kumstát	5	6	6^{7}
15	(United States) R Karki	5	3
WC	(United States) A Johnson	7	6

Quarterfinals
5	(Bulgaria) A Vasilev	6	7
WC	(United States) A Johnson	3	5

==== Section 4 ====
First round
7	(Germany) Niels McDonald	1	4
(Brazil) Luis Guto Miguel	6	6
Savva Rybkin	4	6	0
Q	(United States) Simon Caldwell	6	4	6
(Romania) Ștefan Horia Haita	6	3	4
(Switzerland) Flynn Thomas	2	6	6
(Ukraine) Nikita Bilozertsev	6	4	3
9	(United States) Jack Kennedy	3	6	6
14	(United Kingdom) Oliver Bonding	4	6	7^{10}
(United States) Jack Secord	6	2	6^{0}
(Puerto Rico) Yannik Álvarez	7^{7}	7
WC	(United States) Carel Aubriel Ngounoue	6^{5}	5
Q	(Japan) Naoto Tomizawa	6^{4}	6	6
(United States) Keaton Hance	7^{7}	3	2
(Italy) Gabriele Crivellaro	7	2	3
2	(Spain) Andrés Santamarta Roig	5	6	6

Second round
(Brazil) LG Miguel	6	6
Q	(United States) S Caldwell	4	2
(Switzerland) F Thomas	2	6	3
9	(United States) J Kennedy	6	1	6
14	(United Kingdom) O Bonding	6	7^{7}
(Puerto Rico) Y Álvarez	3	6^{3}
Q	(Japan) N Tomizawa	1	3
2	(Spain) A Santamarta Roig	6	6

Third round
(Brazil) LG Miguel	6	6
9	(United States) J Kennedy	4	4
14	(United Kingdom) O Bonding	6	6
2	(Spain) A Santamarta Roig	3	4

Quarterfinals
(Brazil) LG Miguel	7^{7}	2	6
14	(United Kingdom) O Bonding	6^{5}	6	1

== Qualifying ==
=== Seeds ===
1. (Romania) Matei Todoran (first round)
2. (Turkey) Kerem Yılmaz (first round)
3. (Kazakhstan) Damir Zhalgasbay (first round)
4. (Romania) Alejandro Mateo Berge Nourescu (first round)
5. (Spain) Tito Chávez (qualified)
6. (Japan) Shion Itsusaki (first round)
7. (India) Hitesh Chauhan (qualified)
8. (Spain) Xavi Palomar (first round)
9. (Norway) Johan Oscar Lien (qualified)
10. (Romania) Tudor Batin (qualified)
11. (Brazil) Pedro Henrique Chabalgoity (qualified)
12. (Poland) Jan Chłodnicki (qualifying competition)
13. (India) Rethin Pranav Senthil Kumar (qualifying competition)
14. (Slovenia) Gasper Matijasič (qualifying competition)
15. (United States) Simon Caldwell (qualified)
16. (India) Arjun Rathi (first round)

=== Qualifiers ===
1. (Brazil) Pedro Henrique Chabalgoity
2. (Norway) Johan Oscar Lien
3. (Japan) Naoto Tomizawa
4. (United States) Simon Caldwell
5. (Spain) Tito Chávez
6. (United States) Izyan Ahmad
7. (India) Hitesh Chauhan
8. (Romania) Tudor Batin

=== Draw ===
==== First qualifier ====
First round
1	(Romania) Matei Todoran	4	4
(United States) Ford McCollum	6	6
(Turkey) Haydar Cem Gökpınar	2	6^{6}
11	(Brazil) Pedro Henrique Chabalgoity	6	7^{8}

Qualifying competition
(United States) Ford McCollum	5	5
11	(Brazil) Pedro Henrique Chabalgoity	7	7

==== Second qualifier ====
First round
2	(Turkey) Kerem Yılmaz	4	6	[3]
(United States) Agassi Rusher	6	1	[10]
(United States) Shaan A Majeed	2	4
9	(Norway) Johan Oscar Lien	6	6

Qualifying competition
(United States) Agassi Rusher	3	3
9	(Norway) Johan Oscar Lien	6	6

==== Third qualifier ====
First round
3	(Kazakhstan) Damir Zhalgasbay	3	3
(Japan) Naoto Tomizawa	6	6
(United States) Zachary Cohen	4	4
13	(India) Rethin Pranav Senthil Kumar	6	6

Qualifying competition
(Japan) Naoto Tomizawa	7^{7}	6
13	(India) Rethin Pranav Senthil Kumar	6^{5}	4

==== Fourth qualifier ====
First round
4	(Romania) Alejandro Mateo Berge Nourescu	6	3	[8]
(Denmark) Christian Grønfeldt-Sørensen	3	6	[10]
(Slovakia) Leon Sloboda	6	4	[7]
15	(United States) Simon Caldwell	3	6	[10]

Qualifying competition
(Denmark) Christian Grønfeldt-Sørensen	6^{2}	6	[8]
15	(United States) Simon Caldwell	7^{7}	2	[10]

==== Fifth qualifier ====
First round
5	(Spain) Tito Chávez	6	6
(Japan) Kohshi Ishibashi	2	2
(United States) Sean Grosman	5	3
12	(Poland) Jan Chłodnicki	7	6

Qualifying competition
5	(Spain) Tito Chávez	6	7
12	(Poland) Jan Chłodnicki	2	5

==== Sixth qualifier ====
First round
6	(Japan) Shion Itsusaki	6^{7}	6	[5]
(United States) Izyan Ahmad	7^{9}	3	[10]
(United States) Zavier Augustin	6	6
16	(India) Arjun Rathi	3	0

Qualifying competition
(United States) Izyan Ahmad	6	6
(United States) Zavier Augustin	0	3

==== Seventh qualifier ====
First round
7	(India) Hitesh Chauhan	6	6
(United States) Jerrid Gaines Jr.	2	4
(United States) Lachlan Gaskell	1	4
14	(Slovenia) Gasper Matijasič	6	6

Qualifying competition
7	(India) Hitesh Chauhan	6	6
14	(Slovenia) Gasper Matijasič	3	1

==== Eighth qualifier ====
First round
8	(Spain) Xavi Palomar	1	2
(United States) Nischal Spurling	6	6
(Latvia) Rihards Neimanis	7^{7}	4	[6]
10	(Romania) Tudor Batin	6^{5}	6	[10]

Qualifying competition
(United States) Nischal Spurling	1	3
10	(Romania) Tudor Batin	6	6
