= 2025 US Open – Mixed doubles =

Mixed doubles
- 2025 US Open

Final
- Champions: (Italy) Sara Errani (Italy) Andrea Vavassori
- Runners-up: (Poland) Iga Świątek (Norway) Casper Ruud
- Score: 6–3, 5–7, [10–6]
- Date: August 20, 2025

Details
- Draw: 16
- Seeds: 4

Events
Singles	men	women		boys	girls
Doubles	men	women	mixed	boys	girls
WC Singles	men	women	quad	boys	girls
WC Doubles	men	women	quad	boys	girls
- US Open

Defending champions Sara Errani and Andrea Vavassori defeated Iga Świątek and Casper Ruud in the final, 6–3, 5–7, [10–6] to win the mixed doubles tennis title at the 2025 US Open.

The 2025 US Open mixed doubles was part of the 2025 US Open, and was held on outdoor hardcourts on August 19–20 at the USTA Billie Jean King National Tennis Center in New York City. It was the 137th time a mixed doubles competition was contested at the US Open.

This edition of the tournament marked a substantial revision of the tournament format. Teams were selected on a basis of singles and doubles rankings, and the scoring system was changed to first-to-four-games sets.

== New format ==
The 2025 edition of the US Open was the first with a new format for mixed doubles competition. It was moved to the week ahead of the main tournament, Fan Week, which was the same week as pre-tournament qualifying matches. Mixed doubles were played from Tuesday, August 19 to Wednesday, August 20, the winner's prize was $1 million.

The two days of competition were being held in Arthur Ashe Stadium and Louis Armstrong Stadium featuring 16 teams. Eight teams earned direct entry based on their combined singles ranking and eight teams received wild card entries. Mixed doubles did not include players outside of the singles entry list due to scheduling conflicts with qualifying matches the same week. The matches were being played in best-of-three-sets with short sets to four games, no-ad scoring, tiebreakers at four-all, and a 10-point match tiebreak in lieu of a third set. The final was a best-of-three set match to six games, featuring no-ad scoring, with tiebreakers at six-all with a 10-point match tiebreaker in lieu of a third set.

The change was criticized by some players and fans before the start of the tournament.

== Seeds ==
1. (United States) Jessica Pegula / (United Kingdom) Jack Draper (semifinals)
2. (Kazakhstan) Elena Rybakina / (United States) Taylor Fritz (first round)
3. (Poland) Iga Świątek / (Norway) Casper Ruud (final)
4. (United States) Amanda Anisimova / (Denmark) Holger Rune (first round)

== Draw ==
Key

- Q = Qualifier
- WC = Wild card
- LL = Lucky loser
- Alt = Alternate
- ITF = ITF entry
- PR = Protected ranking
- SR = Special ranking
- SE = Special exempt
- JE = Junior exempt
- JR = Junior Accelerator Programme entrant
- CO = College Accelerator Programme entrant
- NG = Next Gen Accelerator Program entrant
- w/o = Walkover
- r = Retired
- d = Defaulted

=== Draw ===
First round
1	(United States) J Pegula (United Kingdom) J Draper	4	4
WC	(United Kingdom) E Raducanu (Spain) C Alcaraz	2	2
WC	(Serbia) O Danilović (Serbia) N Djokovic	2	3
M Andreeva; D Medvedev	4	5
3	(Poland) I Świątek (Norway) C Ruud	4	4
(United States) M Keys (United States) F Tiafoe	1	2
WC	(Japan) N Osaka (France) G Monfils	3	2
WC	(United States) C McNally (Italy) L Musetti	5	4
Alt	(United States) D Collins (United States) C Harrison	4	5
(Switzerland) B Bencic (Germany) A Zverev	0	3
WC	(United States) T Townsend (United States) B Shelton	4	5^{7}
4	(United States) A Anisimova (Denmark) H Rune	2	4^{2}
WC	(United States) V Williams (United States) R Opelka	2	4^{4}
(Czech Republic) K Muchová; A Rublev	4	5^{7}
WC	(Italy) S Errani (Italy) A Vavassori	4	4
2	(Kazakhstan) E Rybakina (United States) T Fritz	2	2

Quarterfinals
1	(United States) J Pegula (United Kingdom) J Draper	4	4
M Andreeva; D Medvedev	1	1
3	(Poland) I Świątek (Norway) C Ruud	4	4
WC	(United States) C McNally (Italy) L Musetti	1	2
Alt	(United States) D Collins (United States) C Harrison	4	5^{7}
WC	(United States) T Townsend (United States) B Shelton	1	4^{2}
(Czech Republic) K Muchová; A Rublev	1	4^{4}
WC	(Italy) S Errani (Italy) A Vavassori	4	5^{7}

Semifinals
1	(United States) J Pegula (United Kingdom) J Draper	5	3	[8]
3	(Poland) I Świątek (Norway) C Ruud	3	5	[10]
Alt	(United States) D Collins (United States) C Harrison	2	2
WC	(Italy) S Errani (Italy) A Vavassori	4	4

Final
3	(Poland) I Świątek (Norway) C Ruud	3	7	[6]
WC	(Italy) S Errani (Italy) A Vavassori	6	5	[10]

== Other entry information ==
=== Direct entries ===
24 teams initially entered the tournament but only 16 were accepted into the draw. The following 8 teams received direct entry based on their combined singles rankings, with four of these teams seeded.

- (United States) Jessica Pegula / (United Kingdom) Jack Draper
- (Kazakhstan) Elena Rybakina / (United States) Taylor Fritz
- (Poland) Iga Świątek / (Norway) Casper Ruud
- (United States) Amanda Anisimova / (Denmark) Holger Rune
- (Switzerland) Belinda Bencic (Note: Entered using a protected ranking of No. 15.) / (Germany) Alexander Zverev
- Mirra Andreeva / Daniil Medvedev
- (United States) Madison Keys / (United States) Frances Tiafoe
- (Czech Republic) Karolína Muchová / Andrey Rublev

=== Wild cards ===
- (Serbia) Olga Danilović / (Serbia) Novak Djokovic
- (Italy) Sara Errani / (Italy) Andrea Vavassori
- (United States) Caty McNally / (Italy) Lorenzo Musetti
- (Japan) Naomi Osaka / (France) Gaël Monfils
- (United Kingdom) Emma Raducanu / (Spain) Carlos Alcaraz
- ~~(Czech Republic) Kateřina Siniaková / (Italy) Jannik Sinner~~
- (United States) Taylor Townsend / (United States) Ben Shelton
- (United States) Venus Williams / (United States) Reilly Opelka

=== Alternates ===
- (United States) Danielle Collins / (United States) Christian Harrison

=== Withdrawals ===
- (Spain) Paula Badosa / (United Kingdom) Jack Draper → replaced by (United States) Jessica Pegula / (United Kingdom) Jack Draper
- (United States) Emma Navarro / (Italy) Jannik Sinner → replaced by (Czech Republic) Kateřina Siniaková / (Italy) Jannik Sinner
- (Japan) Naomi Osaka / (Australia) Nick Kyrgios (Note: Withdrew from tournament but were not announced as part of the draw.) → replaced by (Japan) Naomi Osaka / (France) Gaël Monfils
- (Italy) Jasmine Paolini / (Italy) Lorenzo Musetti → replaced by (United States) Caty McNally / (Italy) Lorenzo Musetti
- (United States) Jessica Pegula / (United States) Tommy Paul → replaced by (United States) Jessica Pegula / (United Kingdom) Jack Draper
- Aryna Sabalenka / (Bulgaria) Grigor Dimitrov → replaced by (Italy) Jasmine Paolini / (Italy) Lorenzo Musetti
- (Czech Republic) Kateřina Siniaková / (Italy) Jannik Sinner → replaced by (United States) Danielle Collins / (United States) Christian Harrison
- (Croatia) Donna Vekić / (Poland) Hubert Hurkacz → replaced by (Czech Republic) Karolína Muchová / Andrey Rublev
