= 2026 US Open – Men's singles qualifying =

Men's singles qualifying
- 2026 US Open

Events
Singles	men	women		boys	girls
Doubles	men	women	mixed	boys	girls
WC Singles	men	women	quad	boys	girls
WC Doubles	men	women	quad	boys	girls

Qualification
Singles	men	women
- US Open

The 2026 US Open – Men's singles qualifying was a series of tennis matches that took place from 24 to 28 August 2026 (originally to end on 27 August but was rescheduled due to heavy rain) to determine the sixteen qualifiers into the main draw of the men's singles tournament.

16 out of the 128 qualifiers who competed in this knock-out tournament secured a main draw place.

This marked the final major appearance of former world No. 4 and 2014 finalist Kei Nishikori, who lost in the third round of qualifying to compatriot Rei Sakamoto.

== Seeds ==
All seeds are per ATP rankings as of 10 August 2026.

1. (France) Arthur Géa (qualifying competition, lucky loser)
2. (Hong Kong) Coleman Wong (qualified)
3. (France) Hugo Gaston (qualified)
4. (United Kingdom) Jacob Fearnley (qualifying competition, lucky loser)
5. (France) Titouan Droguet (first round)
6. (Japan) Shintaro Mochizuki (qualifying competition, lucky loser)
7. (United Kingdom) Toby Samuel (qualified)
8. (Czech Republic) Dalibor Svrčina (qualified)
9. (Finland) Otto Virtanen (qualifying competition, withdrew, lucky loser)
10. (France) Kyrian Jacquet (second round)
11. (China) Bu Yunchaokete (qualifying competition, lucky loser)
12. (Hungary) Zsombor Piros (qualified)
13. (Colombia) Nicolás Mejía (first round)
14. (Lithuania) Vilius Gaubas (qualifying competition)
15. (Portugal) Henrique Rocha (second round)
16. (Austria) Sebastian Ofner (first round)
17. (Australia) Christopher O'Connell (qualifying competition, retired)
18. (Spain) Pablo Llamas Ruiz (qualifying competition)
19. (Georgia (country)) Nikoloz Basilashvili (first round)
20. (Brazil) Gustavo Heide (first round)
21. (Austria) Jurij Rodionov (qualified)
22. (Italy) Andrea Pellegrino (first round)
23. (France) Alexandre Müller (second round)
24. (Chile) Cristian Garín (qualifying competition, retired)
25. (Bulgaria) Grigor Dimitrov (qualified)
26. (Italy) Stefano Travaglia (first round)
27. (Bolivia) Hugo Dellien (second round)
28. (United States) Mackenzie McDonald (qualifying competition)
29. (Germany) Tom Gentzsch (second round)
30. (Serbia) Dušan Lajović (qualifying competition)
31. (Chile) Tomás Barrios Vera (qualified)
32. (United States) Nishesh Basavareddy (qualified)

== Qualifiers ==
1. (United States) Nishesh Basavareddy
2. (Hong Kong) Coleman Wong
3. (France) Hugo Gaston
4. (Austria) Jurij Rodionov
5. (Chile) Tomás Barrios Vera
6. (Italy) Francesco Passaro
7. (United Kingdom) Toby Samuel
8. (Czech Republic) Dalibor Svrčina
9. (Bulgaria) Grigor Dimitrov
10. (Italy) Andrea Guerrieri
11. (Italy) Federico Cinà
12. (Hungary) Zsombor Piros
13. (Australia) Tristan Schoolkate
14. (United Kingdom) Harry Wendelken
15. (South Africa) Lloyd Harris
16. (Japan) Rei Sakamoto

== Lucky losers ==
1. (United Kingdom) Jacob Fearnley
2. (Japan) Shintaro Mochizuki
3. (France) Arthur Géa
4. (Finland) Otto Virtanen
5. (China) Bu Yunchaokete

== Draw ==
Key

- Q = Qualifier
- WC = Wild card
- LL = Lucky loser
- Alt = Alternate
- ITF = ITF entry
- PR = Protected ranking
- SR = Special ranking
- SE = Special exempt
- JE = Junior exempt
- JR = Junior Accelerator Programme entrant
- CO = College Accelerator Programme entrant
- NG = Next Gen Accelerator Program entrant
- w/o = Walkover
- r = Retired
- d = Defaulted

=== First qualifier ===
First round
1	(France) Arthur Géa	6	7^{7}
(India) Sumit Nagal	3	6^{4}
(France) Clément Chidekh	6	6
PR	(Argentina) Federico Coria	2	2
(Croatia) Luka Mikrut	6	6
(Spain) Nikolás Sánchez Izquierdo	3	4
(France) Moïse Kouamé	6^{3}	6	3
32	(United States) Nishesh Basavareddy	7^{7}	4	6

Second round
1	(France) Arthur Géa	6	6^{4}	6
(France) Clément Chidekh	4	7^{7}	2
(Croatia) Luka Mikrut	2	4
32	(United States) Nishesh Basavareddy	6	6

Qualifying competition
1	(France) Arthur Géa	3	1
32	(United States) Nishesh Basavareddy	6	6

=== Second qualifier ===
First round
2	(Hong Kong) Coleman Wong	5	6	6
(Denmark) Elmer Møller	7	3	4
(Austria) Lukas Neumayer	6	6
Alt	(Australia) James McCabe	1	4
(Germany) Henri Squire	2	6	6^{2}
(Spain) David Jordà Sanchis	6	2	7^{10}
(South Korea) Kwon Soon-woo	6	5	1^{r}
30	(Serbia) Dušan Lajović	4	7	3

Second round
2	(Hong Kong) Coleman Wong	6	6
(Austria) Lukas Neumayer	3	3
(Spain) David Jordà Sanchis	5	6^{2}
30	(Serbia) Dušan Lajović	7	7^{7}

Qualifying competition
2	(Hong Kong) Coleman Wong	6	6
30	(Serbia) Dušan Lajović	4	3

=== Third qualifier ===
First round
3	(France) Hugo Gaston	7	6
(Argentina) Guido Iván Justo	5	3
WC	(United States) Andre Ilagan	6	3	6
(United States) Tristan Boyer	4	6	4
(Switzerland) Jérôme Kym	6	6
(France) Dan Added	0	3
(United States) Colton Smith	4	6	6
22	(Italy) Andrea Pellegrino	6	3	4

Second round
3	(France) Hugo Gaston	6	6
WC	(United States) Andre Ilagan	1	3
(Switzerland) Jérôme Kym	6^{2}	6	4
(United States) Colton Smith	7^{7}	2	6

Qualifying competition
3	(France) Hugo Gaston	1	6	6
(United States) Colton Smith	6	4	2

=== Fourth qualifier ===
First round
4	(United Kingdom) Jacob Fearnley	7^{7}	6
(Spain) Roberto Carballés Baena	6^{3}	3
(France) Luka Pavlovic	6	6^{3}	7
(Peru) Juan Pablo Varillas	3	7^{7}	5
(Germany) Diego Dedura	5	2
(Portugal) Frederico Ferreira Silva	7	6
(Belgium) Kimmer Coppejans	1	4
21	(Austria) Jurij Rodionov	6	6

Second round
4	(United Kingdom) Jacob Fearnley	6	6^{4}	6
(France) Luka Pavlovic	4	7^{7}	4
(Portugal) Frederico Ferreira Silva	2	6	1
21	(Austria) Jurij Rodionov	6	3	6

Qualifying competition
4	(United Kingdom) Jacob Fearnley	6	4	4
21	(Austria) Jurij Rodionov	4	6	6

=== Fifth qualifier ===
First round
5	(France) Titouan Droguet	6	4	6^{1}
(Spain) Daniel Rincón	2	6	7^{10}
(Estonia) Mark Lajal	6	3	3
WC	(United States) Jordan Lee	4	6	6
(Netherlands) Guy den Ouden	7	4	5
(Argentina) Genaro Alberto Olivieri	5	6	7
(Bolivia) Juan Carlos Prado Ángelo	2	7	0
31	(Chile) Tomás Barrios Vera	6	5	6

Second round
(Spain) Daniel Rincón	6	4	6
WC	(United States) Jordan Lee	3	6	1
(Argentina) Genaro Alberto Olivieri	3	1
31	(Chile) Tomás Barrios Vera	6	6

Qualifying competition
(Spain) Daniel Rincón	4	3
31	(Chile) Tomás Barrios Vera	6	6

=== Sixth qualifier ===
First round
6	(Japan) Shintaro Mochizuki	7^{7}	6
WC	(United States) Daniel Milavsky	6^{5}	4
(United States) Braden Shick	6	7
(France) Clément Tabur	4	5
(Italy) Francesco Passaro	7^{7}	6
(United Kingdom) Felix Gill	6^{3}	2
(Spain) Pol Martín Tiffon	5	3
29	(Germany) Tom Gentzsch	7	6

Second round
6	(Japan) Shintaro Mochizuki	6	6
(United States) Braden Shick	4	1
(Italy) Francesco Passaro	7^{7}	6
29	(Germany) Tom Gentzsch	6^{4}	4

Qualifying competition
6	(Japan) Shintaro Mochizuki	4	2
(Italy) Francesco Passaro	6	6

=== Seventh qualifier ===
First round
7	(United Kingdom) Toby Samuel	6^{2}	6	6
(Italy) Francesco Maestrelli	7^{7}	3	1
(Peru) Gonzalo Bueno	1	3
(United Kingdom) Billy Harris	6	6
(Uruguay) Franco Roncadelli	4	3
(Sweden) Elias Ymer	6	6
WC	(United States) Spencer Johnson	6^{5}	6	6^{9}
24	(Chile) Cristian Garín	7^{7}	4	7^{11}

Second round
7	(United Kingdom) Toby Samuel	4	6	6
(United Kingdom) Billy Harris	6	1	4
(Sweden) Elias Ymer	2	6^{5}
24	(Chile) Cristian Garín	6	7^{7}

Qualifying competition
7	(United Kingdom) Toby Samuel	4	6	5
24	(Chile) Cristian Garín	6	4	0^{r}

=== Eighth qualifier ===
First round
8	(Czech Republic) Dalibor Svrčina	6	6
PR	(Brazil) Felipe Meligeni Alves	3	4
(United States) Keegan Smith	6^{4}	3
(Canada) Alexis Galarneau	7^{7}	6
(Italy) Raúl Brancaccio	2	1
(Brazil) Thiago Seyboth Wild	6	6
(Italy) Stefano Napolitano	4	5
28	(United States) Mackenzie McDonald	6	7

Second round
8	(Czech Republic) Dalibor Svrčina	7^{7}	6
(Canada) Alexis Galarneau	6^{3}	2
(Brazil) Thiago Seyboth Wild	4	4
28	(United States) Mackenzie McDonald	6	6

Qualifying competition
8	(Czech Republic) Dalibor Svrčina	4	6	7
28	(United States) Mackenzie McDonald	6	2	5

=== Ninth qualifier ===
First round
9	(Finland) Otto Virtanen	6	6
(France) Ugo Blanchet	4	4
(United Kingdom) Jack Pinnington Jones	7^{7}	6
WC	(United States) Trevor Svajda	6^{4}	4
(Kazakhstan) Timofey Skatov	6	6
(Belgium) Gilles-Arnaud Bailly	4	2
(Italy) Lorenzo Giustino	0	3
25	(Bulgaria) Grigor Dimitrov	6	6

Second round
9	(Finland) Otto Virtanen	2	7^{8}	6
(United Kingdom) Jack Pinnington Jones	6	6^{6}	3
(Kazakhstan) Timofey Skatov	6^{5}	4
25	(Bulgaria) Grigor Dimitrov	7^{7}	6

Qualifying competition
9	(Finland) Otto Virtanen
25	(Bulgaria) Grigor Dimitrov	w/o

=== Tenth qualifier ===
First round
10	(France) Kyrian Jacquet	6	6
(Argentina) Lautaro Midón	4	3
(Argentina) Federico Agustín Gómez	4	2
PR	(Tunisia) Aziz Dougaz	6	6
(Italy) Andrea Guerrieri	6	6^{4}	6
(Denmark) August Holmgren	3	7^{7}	2
(Austria) Joel Schwärzler	2	6	6
20	(Brazil) Gustavo Heide	6	4	4

Second round
10	(France) Kyrian Jacquet	4	6	4
PR	(Tunisia) Aziz Dougaz	6	4	6
(Italy) Andrea Guerrieri	3	6	6
(Austria) Joel Schwärzler	6	4	1

Qualifying competition
PR	(Tunisia) Aziz Dougaz	2	4
(Italy) Andrea Guerrieri	6	6

=== Eleventh qualifier ===
First round
11	(China) Bu Yunchaokete	4	6	6
(Japan) Rio Noguchi	6	4	2
(Czech Republic) Zdeněk Kolář	1	4
(Croatia) Borna Gojo	6	6
(Italy) Luca Nardi	4	0^{r}
(Italy) Federico Cinà	6	3
(Tunisia) Moez Echargui	4	4
27	(Bolivia) Hugo Dellien	6	6

Second round
11	(China) Bu Yunchaokete	6	6
(Croatia) Borna Gojo	4	4
(Italy) Federico Cinà	6	5	7
27	(Bolivia) Hugo Dellien	3	7	5

Qualifying competition
11	(China) Bu Yunchaokete	6	4	5
(Italy) Federico Cinà	3	6	7

=== Twelfth qualifier ===
First round
12	(Hungary) Zsombor Piros	6	6
(Spain) Max Alcalá Gurri	2	1
(Spain) Pedro Martínez	3	2
(Estonia) Daniil Glinka	6	6
(Poland) Maks Kaśnikowski	6^{2}	6	4
(Norway) Nicolai Budkov Kjær	7^{7}	4	6
(Greece) Stefanos Sakellaridis	3	3
17	(Australia) Christopher O'Connell	6	6

Second round
12	(Hungary) Zsombor Piros	6	5	6
(Estonia) Daniil Glinka	3	7	4
(Norway) Nicolai Budkov Kjær	5	4
17	(Australia) Christopher O'Connell	7	6

Qualifying competition
12	(Hungary) Zsombor Piros	5	7^{7}	0
17	(Australia) Christopher O'Connell	7	6^{3}	0^{r}

=== Thirteenth qualifier ===
First round
13	(Colombia) Nicolás Mejía	4	7^{7}	4
(Canada) Liam Draxl	6	6^{5}	6
(Japan) Taro Daniel	6	2	4
WC	(United States) Andrew Johnson	2	6	6
WC	(United States) Jack Secord	3	2
(Australia) Tristan Schoolkate	6	6
PR	(South Korea) Hong Seong-chan	6	7^{7}
19	(Georgia (country)) Nikoloz Basilashvili	3	6^{1}

Second round
(Canada) Liam Draxl	6	6
WC	(United States) Andrew Johnson	4	2
(Australia) Tristan Schoolkate	6	7^{8}
PR	(South Korea) Hong Seong-chan	4	6^{6}

Qualifying competition
(Canada) Liam Draxl	6	5	6^{7}
(Australia) Tristan Schoolkate	4	7	7^{10}

=== Fourteenth qualifier ===
First round
14	(Lithuania) Vilius Gaubas	6	7^{7}
(Switzerland) Kilian Feldbausch	3	6^{1}
(Italy) Marco Cecchinato	7^{7}	6
(United Kingdom) Liam Broady	6^{4}	3
(Switzerland) Rémy Bertola	6	6
(Spain) Alejandro Moro Cañas	3	4
(United Kingdom) Harry Wendelken	6	3	6
26	(Italy) Stefano Travaglia	4	6	3

Second round
14	(Lithuania) Vilius Gaubas	6	6
(Italy) Marco Cecchinato	4	3
(Switzerland) Rémy Bertola	7	6^{4}	4
(United Kingdom) Harry Wendelken	5	7^{7}	6

Qualifying competition
14	(Lithuania) Vilius Gaubas	7^{7}	6^{5}	6^{5}
(United Kingdom) Harry Wendelken	6^{3}	7^{7}	7^{10}

=== Fifteenth qualifier ===
First round
15	(Portugal) Henrique Rocha	7	6
(United States) Michael Mmoh	5	4
(Australia) Bernard Tomic	2	7	2
(South Africa) Lloyd Harris	6	5	6
(Belgium) Gauthier Onclin	5	5
(Ukraine) Vitaliy Sachko	7	7
(Australia) Alex Bolt	6^{3}	5
18	(Spain) Pablo Llamas Ruiz	7^{7}	7

Second round
15	(Portugal) Henrique Rocha	6	2	6^{10}
(South Africa) Lloyd Harris	2	6	7^{12}
(Ukraine) Vitaliy Sachko	2	6	6^{11}
18	(Spain) Pablo Llamas Ruiz	6	4	7^{13}

Qualifying competition
(South Africa) Lloyd Harris	7^{7}	6
18	(Spain) Pablo Llamas Ruiz	6^{3}	3

=== Sixteenth qualifier ===
First round
16	(Austria) Sebastian Ofner	1	6	2
WC	(Japan) Kei Nishikori	6	2	6
WC	(United States) Michael Antonius	6	6
(United Kingdom) Henry Searle	1	2
Alt	(United Kingdom) Jay Clarke	6	3	4
(Japan) Rei Sakamoto	4	6	6
(Serbia) Laslo Djere	5	0
23	(France) Alexandre Müller	7	6

Second round
WC	(Japan) Kei Nishikori	6	6
WC	(United States) Michael Antonius	4	4
(Japan) Rei Sakamoto	6	6
23	(France) Alexandre Müller	3	3

Qualifying competition
WC	(Japan) Kei Nishikori	4	6^{3}
(Japan) Rei Sakamoto	6	7^{7}

== Qualifying wild card challenge ==
The US Open qualifying wild card challenge was a new competition featuring rising American men and women competing for a wild card in the US Open Qualifying Tournament.

The Challenge featured four men and four women competing in six total matches — men’s and women’s semifinals and finals — with the winners receiving a wild card into the US Open qualifying event.

=== Wild card challenge seeds ===
1. (United States) Dali Blanch (final)
2. (United States) Ozan Baris (semifinals)

=== Wild card challenge draw ===
Semifinals
1	(United States) Dali Blanch	6	1	[10]
(United States) Keaton Hance	3	6	[7]
(United States) Jack Secord	3	6	[11]
2	(United States) Ozan Baris	6	2	[9]

Final
1	(United States) Dali Blanch	4	2
(United States) Jack Secord	6	6
