= 2026 US Open – Wheelchair boys' doubles =

Tennis championship

Wheelchair boys' doubles
- 2026 US Open

Final
- Champions: (Japan) Hirofumi Inoue (United Kingdom) Matthew Knoesen
- Runners-up: (United Kingdom) Will Barton (Italy) Lorenzo Politano
- Score: 6–1, 6–0
- Date: September 11, 2026

Details
- Draw: 4
- Seeds: 2

Events
Singles	men	women		boys	girls
Doubles	men	women	mixed	boys	girls
WC Singles	men	women	quad	boys	girls
WC Doubles	men	women	quad	boys	girls
- US Open

Ruben Harris and Maximilian Taucher are the defending champions.

== Seeds ==
1. (Japan) Hirofumi Inoue / (United Kingdom) Matthew Knoesen (champions)
2. (United Kingdom) Will Barton / (Italy) Lorenzo Politano (final)

== Draw ==
Key

- Q = Qualifier
- WC = Wild card
- LL = Lucky loser
- Alt = Alternate
- ITF = ITF entry
- PR = Protected ranking
- SR = Special ranking
- SE = Special exempt
- JE = Junior exempt
- JR = Junior Accelerator Programme entrant
- CO = College Accelerator Programme entrant
- NG = Next Gen Accelerator Program entrant
- w/o = Walkover
- r = Retired
- d = Defaulted

=== Finals ===
Semifinals
1	(Japan) Hirofumi Inoue (United Kingdom) Matthew Knoesen	6	7^{7}
(United States) Matthew Nadauld (Australia) Sonny Rennison	3	6^{4}
(Sweden) Jeremy Che (Netherlands) Yun Kloosterman	3	3
2	(United Kingdom) Will Barton (Italy) Lorenzo Politano	6	6

Final
1	(Japan) Hirofumi Inoue (United Kingdom) Matthew Knoesen	6	6
2	(United Kingdom) Will Barton (Italy) Lorenzo Politano	1	0
