= 2026 US Open – Wheelchair quad singles =

Tennis championship

Wheelchair quad singles
- 2026 US Open

Final
- Champion: (Netherlands) Niels Vink
- Runner-up: (Netherlands) Sam Schröder
- Score: 6–2, 7–5
- Date: September 12, 2026

Details
- Draw: 16
- Seeds: 4

Events
Singles	men	women		boys	girls
Doubles	men	women	mixed	boys	girls
WC Singles	men	women	quad	boys	girls
WC Doubles	men	women	quad	boys	girls
- US Open

Defending champion Niels Vink defeated Sam Schröder in a rematch of the previous three years' finals, 6–2, 7–5 to win the quad singles wheelchair tennis title at the 2026 US Open. With the win, Vink completed the Grand Slam, becoming the second player to do so in quad singles (after Dylan Alcott in 2021).

== Seeds ==
1. (Netherlands) Niels Vink (champion)
2. (Netherlands) Sam Schröder (final)
3. (Israel) Guy Sasson (semifinals)
4. (Turkey) Ahmet Kaplan (semifinals)

== Draw ==
Key

- Q = Qualifier
- WC = Wild card
- LL = Lucky loser
- Alt = Alternate
- ITF = ITF entry
- PR = Protected ranking
- SR = Special ranking
- SE = Special exempt
- JE = Junior exempt
- JR = Junior Accelerator Programme entrant
- CO = College Accelerator Programme entrant
- NG = Next Gen Accelerator Program entrant
- w/o = Walkover
- r = Retired
- d = Defaulted

=== Draw ===
First round
1	(Netherlands) Niels Vink	6	6
(United Kingdom) Andy Lapthorne	2	1
WC	(United States) Andrew Bogdanov	2	1
(Brazil) Leandro Pena	6	6
3	(Israel) Guy Sasson	6	6
(Australia) Heath Davidson	1	0
(South Africa) Leon Els	6	6
(Brazil) Ymanitu Silva	1	0
(Argentina) Gonzalo Enrique Lazarte	6	6
(United Kingdom) Gregory Slade	4	2
(Chile) Francisco Cayulef	5	3
4	(Turkey) Ahmet Kaplan	7	6
(United States) David Wagner	1	6^{9}
(Australia) Benjamin Wenzel	6	7^{11}
(Australia) Jin Woodman	6	3	1
2	(Netherlands) Sam Schröder	2	6	6

Quarterfinals
1	(Netherlands) N Vink	6	6
(Brazil) L Pena	4	1
3	(Israel) G Sasson	6	6
(South Africa) L Els	2	2
(Argentina) GE Lazarte	7	3	1
4	(Turkey) A Kaplan	5	6	6
(Australia) B Wenzel	3	1
2	(Netherlands) S Schröder	6	6

Semifinals
1	(Netherlands) N Vink	7	6
3	(Israel) G Sasson	5	3
4	(Turkey) A Kaplan	3	1
2	(Netherlands) S Schröder	6	6

Final
1	(Netherlands) N Vink	6	7
2	(Netherlands) S Schröder	2	5
