= 2026 US Open – Wheelchair boys' singles =

Wheelchair boys' singles
- 2026 US Open

Final
- Champion: (United Kingdom) Matthew Knoesen
- Runner-up: (Australia) Sonny Rennison
- Score: 6–0, 6–2
- Date: September 11, 2026

Details
- Draw: 8
- Seeds: 2

Events
Singles	men	women		boys	girls
Doubles	men	women	mixed	boys	girls
WC Singles	men	women	quad	boys	girls
WC Doubles	men	women	quad	boys	girls
- US Open

Maximilian Taucher was the defending champion.

== Seeds ==
1. (United Kingdom) Matthew Knoesen (champion)
2. (Italy) Lorenzo Politano (quarterfinals)

== Draw ==
Key

- Q = Qualifier
- WC = Wild card
- LL = Lucky loser
- Alt = Alternate
- ITF = ITF entry
- PR = Protected ranking
- SR = Special ranking
- SE = Special exempt
- JE = Junior exempt
- JR = Junior Accelerator Programme entrant
- CO = College Accelerator Programme entrant
- NG = Next Gen Accelerator Program entrant
- w/o = Walkover
- r = Retired
- d = Defaulted

=== Draw ===
Quarterfinals
1	(United Kingdom) Matthew Knoesen	6	6
(Japan) Hirofumi Inoue	3	3
(United Kingdom) Will Barton	2	3
(United States) Matthew Nadauld	6	6
(Sweden) Jeremy Che	5	2
(Netherlands) Yun Kloosterman	7	6
(Australia) Sonny Rennison	6	6
2	(Italy) Lorenzo Politano	3	2

Semifinals
1	(United Kingdom) Matthew Knoesen	6	7
(United States) Matthew Nadauld	0	5
(Netherlands) Yun Kloosterman	2	4
(Australia) Sonny Rennison	6	6

Final
1	(United Kingdom) Matthew Knoesen	6	6
(Australia) Sonny Rennison	0	2
