= 2026 US Open – Girls' singles =

Tennis championship

Girls' singles
- 2026 US Open

Final
- Champion: (China) Sun Xinran
- Runner-up: Anna Pushkareva
- Score: 6–4, 4–6, 6–0
- Date: September 12, 2026

Details
- Draw: 64 (8Q / 8WC)
- Seeds: 16

Events
Singles	men	women		boys	girls
Doubles	men	women	mixed	boys	girls
WC Singles	men	women	quad	boys	girls
WC Doubles	men	women	quad	boys	girls
- US Open

Sun Xinran won the girls' singles title at the 2026 US Open, defeating Anna Pushkareva in the final, 6–4, 4–6, 6–0. The final was a rematch of the Wimbledon final, won by Pushkareva.

Jeline Vandromme was the defending champion, but was no longer eligible to compete in junior events. She competed in women's singles qualifying, where she lost to Robin Montgomery in the second round.

== Seeds ==
1. (China) Sun Xinran (champion)
2. (Czech Republic) Jana Kovačková (semifinals)
3. (France) Ksenia Efremova (second round)
4. (Brazil) Victoria Luíza Barros (first round)
5. Anna Pushkareva (final)
6. (United States) Janae Preston (quarterfinals, retired)
7. Mariia Makarova (quarterfinals)
8. (Brazil) Nauhany Vitória Leme da Silva (quarterfinals)
9. (Ukraine) Polina Skliar (third round)
10. (Spain) Paola Piñera Celorio (third round)
11. Felitsata Dorofeeva-Rybas (third round)
12. (Argentina) Sol Ailin Larraya Guidi (third round)
13. (Spain) Charo Esquiva Bañuls (second round)
14. (United States) Kristina Penickova (third round)
15. (India) Maaya Rajeshwaran Revathi (second round)
16. (United States) Jordyn Hazelitt (second round)

Click on the seed number of a player to go to their draw section.

== Draw ==
Key

- Q = Qualifier
- WC = Wild card
- LL = Lucky loser
- Alt = Alternate
- ITF = ITF entry
- PR = Protected ranking
- SR = Special ranking
- SE = Special exempt
- JE = Junior exempt
- JR = Junior Accelerator Programme entrant
- CO = College Accelerator Programme entrant
- NG = Next Gen Accelerator Program entrant
- w/o = Walkover
- r = Retired
- d = Defaulted

=== Finals ===
Quarterfinals
1	(China) Sun Xinran	7^{7}	6
7	Mariia Makarova	6^{2}	1
(United States) Chukwumelije Clarke	6	5	6
8	(Brazil) Nauhany Vitória Leme da Silva	3	7	3
5	Anna Pushkareva	6	6
Ekaterina Dotsenko	4	0
6	(United States) Janae Preston	2	0^{r}
2	(Czech Republic) Jana Kovačková	6	0

Semifinals
1	(China) Sun Xinran	7	0	6
(United States) Chukwumelije Clarke	5	6	1
5	Anna Pushkareva	6	7
2	(Czech Republic) Jana Kovačková	1	5

Final
1	(China) Sun Xinran	6	4	6
5	Anna Pushkareva	4	6	0

=== Top half ===
==== Section 1 ====
First round
1	(China) Sun Xinran	6	6
SE	Alisa Terentyeva	3	1
WC	(United States) Thara Gowda	6	6
(Germany) Emily Victoria Eigelsbach	2	4
(Ukraine) Antonina Sushkova	6	6
(Chinese Taipei) Lin Yu-chen	3	0
(Australia) Renee Alame	1	1
14/WC	(United States) Kristina Penickova	6	6
12	(Argentina) Sol Ailin Larraya Guidi	5	6	6
Q	(United States) Natalie Kha	7	3	4
(Italy) Ilary Pistola	6	3	6
(Austria) Anna Pircher	3	6	1
Q	(Canada) Clémence Mercier	2	6	6
(United States) Anita Tu	6	1	2
WC	(United States) Allison Wang	1	5
7	Mariia Makarova	6	7

Second round
1	(China) X Sun	6	7
WC	(United States) T Gowda	0	5
(Ukraine) A Sushkova	6	4	2
14/WC	(United States) K Penickova	4	6	6
12	(Argentina) SA Larraya Guidi	4	6	6
(Italy) I Pistola	6	4	3
Q	(Canada) C Mercier	1	2
7	M Makarova	6	6

Third round
1	(China) X Sun	7	2	6
14/WC	(United States) K Penickova	5	6	1
12	(Argentina) SA Larraya Guidi	0	7^{7}	4
7	M Makarova	6	6^{3}	6

Quarterfinals
1	(China) X Sun	7^{7}	6
7	M Makarova	6^{2}	1

==== Section 2 ====
First round
3	(France) Ksenia Efremova	6	6
Q	(United States) Scarlett Fagan	4	1
(China) Zhang Ruien	6	6
(Romania) Maria Valentina Pop	1	1
Polina Berezina	4	0
(United States) Chukwumelije Clarke	6	6
Q	(Serbia) Dušica Popovski	2	0
13	(Spain) Charo Esquiva Bañuls	6	6
11	Felitsata Dorofeeva-Rybas	6	6
(Ukraine) Sofiia Bielinska	1	4
(United States) Thea Frodin	6	6^{3}	4
(Czech Republic) Kateřina Zajíčková	3	7^{7}	6
(Jamaica) Alyssa James	3	5
(United Kingdom) Daniella Britton	6	7
(United States) Olivia Traynor	6^{5}	3
8	(Brazil) Nauhany Vitória Leme da Silva	7^{7}	6

Second round
3	(France) K Efremova	6^{6}	2
(China) R Zhang	7^{8}	6
(United States) C Clarke	6	7^{7}
13	(Spain) C Esquiva Bañuls	4	6^{3}
11	F Dorofeeva-Rybas	6	7^{7}
(Czech Republic) K Zajíčková	3	6^{3}
(United Kingdom) D Britton	4	7^{7}	0^{r}
8	(Brazil) NV Leme da Silva	6	6^{3}	0

Third round
(China) R Zhang	3	3
(United States) C Clarke	6	6
11	F Dorofeeva-Rybas	2	4
8	(Brazil) NV Leme da Silva	6	6

Quarterfinals
(United States) C Clarke	6	5	6
8	(Brazil) NV Leme da Silva	3	7	3

=== Bottom half ===
==== Section 3 ====
First round
5	Anna Pushkareva	6	6
WC	(United States) Shristi Selvan	2	4
(China) Shao Yushan	6	6
(Argentina) Sofía Meabe	2	3
(Romania) Maia Ilinca Burcescu	1	2
Q	(United States) Yael Saffar	6	6
(Czech Republic) Tereza Hermanová	5	1
10	(Spain) Paola Piñera Celorio	7	6
16	(United States) Jordyn Hazelitt	7^{7}	7
(Hungary) Lujza Béviz	6^{4}	5
Ekaterina Dotsenko	2	6	6
(Canada) Nadia Lagaev	6	4	1
(China) Lin Yujun	6	3	6
Q	(Japan) Kokona Ishii	4	6	2
WC	(United States) Annika Penickova	6	6
4	(Brazil) Victoria Luíza Barros	3	4

Second round
5	A Pushkareva	6	6
(China) Y Shao	4	2
Q	(United States) Y Saffar	2	3
10	(Spain) P Piñera Celorio	6	6
16	(United States) J Hazelitt	5	6	4
E Dotsenko	7	1	6
(China) Y Lin	3	1
WC	(United States) A Penickova	6	6

Third round
5	A Pushkareva	6	6
10	(Spain) P Piñera Celorio	1	1
E Dotsenko	2	7^{7}	6
WC	(United States) A Penickova	6	6^{5}	3

Quarterfinals
5	A Pushkareva	6	6
E Dotsenko	4	0

==== Section 4 ====
First round
6	(United States) Janae Preston	6	6
(Netherlands) Fleur de Bresser	1	0
Q	(Latvia) Marija Lauva	4	6	6^{3}
(Canada) Avery Alexander	6	4	7^{10}
WC	(United States) Isha Manchala	6	3	6
Alexandra Malova	2	6	3
(United Kingdom) Hollie Smart	2	4
9	(Ukraine) Polina Skliar	6	6
15	(India) Maaya Rajeshwaran Revathi	6	6
WC	(United States) Emery Combs	2	2
(China) Qu Yihan	6^{4}	6	6^{6}
Q	Arina Malygina	7^{7}	2	7^{10}
(South Korea) Jeong Ui-su	3	3
WC	(United States) Hannah Ayrault	6	6
Alt	(Japan) Riyo Yoshida	6	4	2
2	(Czech Republic) Jana Kovačková	4	6	6

Second round
6	(United States) J Preston	4	6	6
(Canada) A Alexander	6	3	2
WC	(United States) I Manchala	3	2
9	(Ukraine) P Skliar	6	6
15	(India) M Rajeshwaran Revathi	3	7	5
Q	A Malygina	6	5	7
WC	(United States) H Ayrault	3	3
2	(Czech Republic) J Kovačková	6	6

Third round
6	(United States) J Preston	7^{12}	6
9	(Ukraine) P Skliar	6^{10}	3
Q	A Malygina	3	4
2	(Czech Republic) J Kovačková	6	6

Quarterfinals
6	(United States) J Preston	2	0r
2	(Czech Republic) J Kovačková	6	0

== Qualifying ==
=== Seeds ===
1. (Brazil) Pietra Rivoli (first round)
2. (South Korea) Sim Siyoen (qualifying competition)
3. (Serbia) Dušica Popovski (qualified)
4. Alisa Terentyeva (withdrew)
5. (United States) Margaret Sohns (first round)
6. (United States) Sarah Ye (first round)
7. (United States) Kennedy Drenser-Hagmann (first round)
8. (Chile) Camila Rodero Contreras (first round)
9. (Latvia) Marija Lauva (qualified)
10. (United States) Ireland O'Brien (qualifying competition)
11. (United States) Nancy Lee (first round, retired)
12. (Bosnia and Herzegovina) Tea Kovačević (first round)
13. (Japan) Ran Wakana (qualifying competition)
14. (United States) Carrie-Anne Hoo (qualifying competition)
15. (Mexico) Marianne Ángel González (qualifying competition)
16. (Czech Republic) Pavla Švíglerová (qualifying competition)

=== Qualifiers ===
1. (Japan) Kokona Ishii
2. (Latvia) Marija Lauva
3. (Serbia) Dušica Popovski
4. (United States) Scarlett Fagan
5. (United States) Natalie Kha
6. (Canada) Clémence Mercier
7. Arina Malygina
8. (United States) Yael Saffar

=== Draw ===
==== First qualifier ====
First round
1	(Brazil) Pietra Rivoli	1	1
WC	(United States) Nadia Poznick	6	6
(Japan) Kokona Ishii	6	4
11	(United States) Nancy Lee	3	1^{r}

Qualifying competition
WC	(United States) Nadia Poznick	0	3
(Japan) Kokona Ishii	6	6

==== Second qualifier ====
First round
2	(South Korea) Sim Siyoen	6	6
WC	(United States) Anya Arora	2	4
WC	(United States) Anna Kapanadze	5	3
9	(Latvia) Marija Lauva	7	6

Qualifying competition
2	(South Korea) Sim Siyoen	4	2
9	(Latvia) Marija Lauva	6	6

==== Third qualifier ====
First round
3	(Serbia) Dušica Popovski	7^{7}	6
(United States) Brooke Wallman	6^{4}	1
(United States) Isabelle Thi DeLuccia	2	6	[7]
16	(Czech Republic) Pavla Švíglerová	6	4	[10]

Qualifying competition
3	(Serbia) Dušica Popovski	6^{3}	6	[10]
16	(Czech Republic) Pavla Švíglerová	7^{7}	4	[5]

==== Fourth qualifier ====
First round
Alt	(United States) Scarlett Fagan	6	2	[10]
(United States) Olivia De Los Reyes	3	6	[7]
(Poland) Barbara Kostecka	5	4
10	(United States) Ireland O'Brien	7	6

Qualifying competition
Alt	(United States) Scarlett Fagan	6	7
10	(United States) Ireland O'Brien	3	5

==== Fifth qualifier ====
First round
5	(United States) Margaret Sohns	3	6	[5]
(Japan) Riyo Yoshida	6	2	[10]
WC	(United States) Natalie Kha	6	6
12	(Bosnia and Herzegovina) Tea Kovačević	4	2

Qualifying competition
(Japan) Riyo Yoshida	6^{4}	2
WC	(United States) Natalie Kha	7^{7}	6

==== Sixth qualifier ====
First round
6	(United States) Sarah Ye	3	2
(Canada) Clémence Mercier	6	6
WC	(United States) Kathryn Cragg	1	4
13	(Japan) Ran Wakana	6	6

Qualifying competition
(Canada) Clémence Mercier	4	6	[10]
13	(Japan) Ran Wakana	6	2	[6]

==== Seventh qualifier ====
First round
7	(United States) Kennedy Drenser-Hagmann	6^{5}	7	[8]
Arina Malygina	7^{7}	5	[10]
(United States) Armira Kockinis	6	2	[8]
15	(Mexico) Marianne Ángel González	1	6	[10]

Qualifying competition
Arina Malygina	4	6	[10]
15	(Mexico) Marianne Ángel González	6	3	[5]

==== Eighth qualifier ====
First round
8	(Chile) Camila Rodero Contreras	1	3
(United States) Yael Saffar	6	6
WC	(Japan) Yui Kubota	2	3
14	(United States) Carrie-Anne Hoo	6	6

Qualifying competition
(United States) Yael Saffar	5	6	[10]
14	(United States) Carrie-Anne Hoo	7	4	[5]

== Other entry information ==
=== Wildcards ===
- (United States) Hannah Ayrault
- (United States) Emery Combs
- (United States) Thara Gowda
- (United States) Isha Manchala
- (United States) Annika Penickova
- (United States) Kristina Penickova
- (United States) Shristi Selvan
- (United States) Allison Wang
