= Thilo Behrmann =

Austrian tennis player (born 2008)

- Country (sports): Austria
- Born: 27 January 2008 (age 18) Freising, Germany
- Prize money: US $2,349

Singles
- Career record: 0–0
- Career titles: 0
- Highest ranking: No. 1,200 (14 September 2026)
- Current ranking: No. 1,200 (14 September 2026)

Grand Slam singles results
- Australian Open Junior: 3R (2026)
- French Open Junior: QF (2026)
- Wimbledon Junior: 1R (2025, 2026)
- US Open Junior: SF (2026)

Doubles
- Career record: 0–0
- Career titles: 0
- Highest ranking: No. 1,856 (14 September 2026)
- Current ranking: No. 1,856 (14 September 2026)

Grand Slam doubles results
- Australian Open Junior: 2R (2026)
- French Open Junior: 2R (2025, 2026)
- Wimbledon Junior: 1R (2025, 2026)
- US Open Junior: 2R (2026)
- Last updated on: 14 September 2026.

Thilo Behrmann is an Austrian tennis player. Behrmann has a career-high ITF junior combined ranking of No. 3 achieved on 14 September 2026. He also has a career-high ATP singles ranking of No. 1,200 and a doubles ranking of No. 1,856, both achieved on 14 September 2026.

== Career ==
A member of Tennis Academy Burgenland, Behrmann won the silver medal at the 2023 European Youth Summer Olympic Festival in Maribor, Slovenia having overcome Ziga Sesko and Niels McDonald before facing Italian Vito Antonio Darderi in the final.

In April 2026, he won the J500 title in Cairo, defeating Valentín González-Galiño to ride to a career-high junior ranking of world no. 11. In May, he made it to the J500 title in Milan, where he lost to Jamie Mackenzie.

He reached the quarter-finals of the boys' singles at the 2026 French Open, but was defeated by Brazilian top-seed Luis Guto Miguel. At the 2026 US Open he reached the semifinals of the boys' singles, defeating Andrew Johnson along the way, before again losing to Guto Miguel of Brazil.

In August 2026, he made it to his first ITF Tour final in Mistelbach, losing to Nikita Mashtakov.

== Personal life ==
Behrmann was born in Freising, Germany, to an Austrian mother and a German father

== ITF World Tennis Tour finals ==
=== Singles: 1 (1 runner-up) ===
Finals by surface
Hard (0–0)
Clay (0–1)
Grass (0–0)

Result	W–L	Date	Tournament	Tier	Surface	Opponent	Score
Loss	0–1	Aug 2026	M15 Mistelbach, Austria	WTT	Clay	(Ukraine) Nikita Mashtakov	6–2, 3–6, 4–6
