= Sergei Lysov =

Israeli wheelchair tennis Paralympian

- Full name: Sergei Sergeyevich Lysov
- Native name: סרגיי ליסוב
- Country (sports): Israel
- Residence: Ramat Gan, Israel
- Born: 22 April 2004 (age 22) Tolyatti, Russia
- Plays: Right-handed (two-handed backhand)
- Coach: Ofri Lankri; Keren Shlomo (tour)

Singles
- Career titles: 2024 Israeli National Champion
- Highest ranking: No. 12 (9 June 2025)

Grand Slam singles results
- French Open: 1R (2025, 2026)
- Wimbledon: 1R (2026)
- US Open: QF (2025)

Other tournaments
- Paralympic Games: 2R (2024)

Doubles
- Highest ranking: No. 16 (26 January 2026)

Grand Slam doubles results
- French Open: QF (2025, 2026)
- Wimbledon: SF (2025)
- US Open: QF (2025)

Other doubles tournaments
- Paralympic Games: 2R (2024)

Sergei Lysov (סרגיי ליסוב; born April 22, 2004) is an Israeli wheelchair tennis player. He has represented Israel internationally at major competitions, including the 2024 Summer Paralympics in Paris and multiple Grand Slam tournaments. Lysov reached a career-high singles world ranking of No. 12 in 2026.

Lysov returned to New York City in September 2026 to compete in both the men's wheelchair singles and, partnering Takuya Miki of Japan, the men's wheelchair doubles events at the 2026 US Open.

== Early life ==
Lysov was born in Tolyatti, Russia. As a child, he played association football.

== Perthes disease ==
At nine years old, Lysov was diagnosed with Perthes disease (idiopathic avascular necrosis of the hip), a rare childhood disorder disrupting the essential blood supply to the hip joint. The condition resulted in extreme bone loss, and prevented him from playing standing sports.

He transferred to a specialized school that offered resources for children with physical disabilities. There, Lysov was introduced to wheelchair tennis. In 2018, he won a gold medal in the Junior division of the International Tennis Federation World Team Cup.

== Immigration to Israel ==
In 2019, at the age of 16, Lysov and his family made aliyah, immigrating to Israel. The Israel ParaSport Center supported his family in settling in Ramat Gan, and financed his tennis equipment and international travel.

== Wheelchair tennis career ==
Lysov trains at the Israel ParaSport Center under the guidance of former professionals, including head coach Ofri Lankri and Israeli Paralympic tennis player Boaz Kramer. He won the 2024 Israeli National Wheelchair Tennis Championship.

=== 2024 Summer Paralympics ===
Lysov represented Israel at the 2024 Summer Paralympics in Paris, competing in the men's wheelchair tennis singles event at Stade Roland Garros. He defeated Brayan Tapia of Chile in his Paralympic debut match, before falling to top seed Alfie Hewett of Great Britain in the second round.

=== Grand Slam breakthrough ===
Lysov made his Grand Slam debut at the 2025 US Open Wheelchair Championships in Flushing Meadows, New York. In the first round of the Men's Singles tournament, he defeated American player Conner Stroud, as his serve reached 93 mph (150 km/h). He advanced to the quarterfinals, where he played against top-seeded and World No. 1 Japanese player Tokito Oda, who defeated him and went on to win the tournament.

In early 2026, Lysov reached a career-high ranking of world No. 12. He has competed in multiple Grand Slam championships, appearing in the main draws of the Australian Open, French Open, and Wimbledon.

Lysov returned to Flushing Meadows in September 2026 to compete in both the men's wheelchair singles and, partnering Takuya Miki of Japan, the men's wheelchair doubles events at the 2026 US Open.

== See also ==
- Israel at the Paralympics
