= Takuya Miki =

Japanese wheelchair tennis player

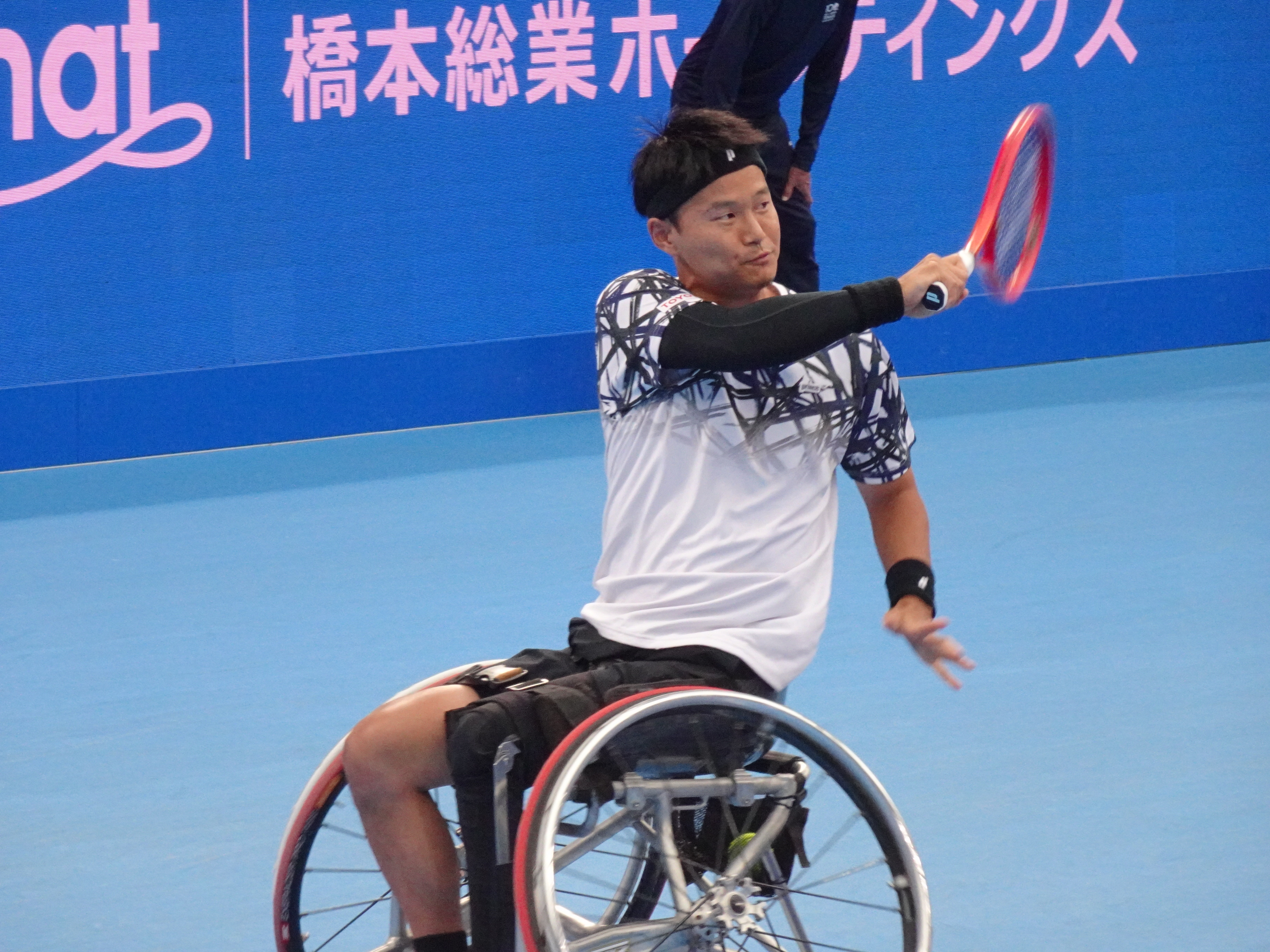
- Takuya Miki in Tokyo, Japan, 2025
- Country (sports): Japan
- Born: April 30, 1989 (age 37) Izumo, Japan
- Plays: Right-handed

Singles
- Highest ranking: No. 5 (30 January 2023)
- Current ranking: No. 7 (July 13, 2026)

Grand Slam singles results
- Australian Open: SF (2023)
- French Open: SF (2024)
- Wimbledon: QF (2023, 2026)
- US Open: SF (2022)

Doubles
- Highest ranking: No. 4 (July 08, 2024)
- Current ranking: No. 17 (July 13, 2026)

Grand Slam doubles results
- Australian Open: F (2024)
- French Open: F (2024)
- Wimbledon: F (2023, 2024)
- US Open: F (2023)

Other doubles tournaments
- Paralympic Games: Silver Medal (2024)

Takuya Miki (三木 拓也, Miki Takuya) is a Japanese professional wheelchair tennis player. He competed in wheelchair tennis at the 2016 Summer Paralympics, the 2020 Summer Paralympics and 2024 Summer Paralympics.

Miki competed in New York City in September 2026 in both the men's wheelchair singles and, partnering Sergei Lysov of Israel, the men's wheelchair doubles events at the 2026 US Open.

== Career statistics ==
=== Grand Slam performance timelines ===
Key
W	F	SF	QF	#R	RR	Q#	DNQ	A	NH

(W) winner; (F) finalist; (SF) semifinalist; (QF) quarterfinalist; (#R) rounds 4, 3, 2, 1; (RR) round-robin stage; (Q#) qualification round; (DNQ) did not qualify; (A) absent; (NH) not held; (SR) strike rate (events won / competed); (W–L) win–loss record.
To avoid confusion and double counting, these charts are updated at the conclusion of a tournament or when the player's participation has ended.

==== Wheelchair singles ====
Tournament	2022	2023	2024	2025	2026	SR	W–L	Win %
Australian Open	A	SF	1R	1R	1R	0 / 4	2–4	33%
French Open	A	QF	SF	1R	1R	0 / 4	3–4	43%
Wimbledon	A	QF	1R	1R	QF	0 / 4	1–4	20%
US Open	SF	QF	NH	1R	1R	0 / 4	3–4	43%
Win–loss	2–1	4–4	2–3	0–4	1–4	0 / 16	9–16	36%

==== Wheelchair doubles ====
Tournament	2022	2023	2024	2025	2026	SR	W–L	Win %
Grand Slam tournaments
Australian Open	A	QF	F	QF	QF	0 / 4	2–4	33%
French Open	QF	QF	F	SF	SF	0 / 5	5–5	50%
Wimbledon	A	F	F	QF	QF	0 / 4	3–4	43%
US Open	QF	F	NH	SF	QF	0 / 4	2–4	33%
Win–loss	1–2	3–4	6–3	2–4	1–4	0 / 17	14–17	45%

===== Grand Slam tournament finals =====
====== Wheelchair doubles: 5 (0 titles, 5 runner-ups) ======
Result	Year	Championship	Surface	Partner	Opponents	Score
Loss	2023	Wimbledon	Grass	(Japan) Tokito Oda	(United Kingdom) Alfie Hewett (United Kingdom) Gordon Reid	6–3, 0–6, 3–6
Loss	2023	US Open	Hard	(Japan) Tokito Oda	(France) Stéphane Houdet (Japan) Takashi Sanada	4–6, 4–6
Loss	2024	Australian Open	Hard	(Japan) Tokito Oda	(United Kingdom) Alfie Hewett (United Kingdom) Gordon Reid	3–6, 2–6
Loss	2024	French Open	Clay	(Japan) Tokito Oda	(United Kingdom) Alfie Hewett (United Kingdom) Gordon Reid	1–6, 4–6
Loss	2024	Wimbledon	Grass	(Japan) Tokito Oda	(United Kingdom) Alfie Hewett (United Kingdom) Gordon Reid	4–6, 6–7^{(2–7)}
