= Kristina Penickova =

American tennis player (born 2009)

- Penickova at the 2026 US Open
- Country (sports): United States
- Residence: Orlando, Florida, US
- Born: September 11, 2009 (age 17) Campbell, California, US
- Plays: Right (two-handed backhand)
- Coach: Tomáš Pěnička
- Prize money: $86,970

Singles
- Career record: 24–22
- Career titles: 0
- Highest ranking: No. 815 (November 24, 2025)
- Current ranking: No. 881 (June 29, 2026)

Grand Slam singles results
- US Open: Q2 (2026)
- Australian Open Junior: F (2025)
- French Open Junior: SF (2024)
- Wimbledon Junior: 2R (2024, 2025)
- US Open Junior: 3R (2024, 2025, 2026)

Doubles
- Career record: 18–8
- Career titles: 2 ITF
- Highest ranking: No. 758 (November 24, 2025)
- Current ranking: No. 855 (June 29, 2026)

Grand Slam doubles results
- US Open: 1R (2025, 2026)
- Australian Open Junior: W (2025)
- French Open Junior: SF (2025)
- Wimbledon Junior: W (2025)
- US Open Junior: W (2026)
- Last updated on: July 7, 2026.

Kristina Penickova (born September 11, 2009) is an American tennis player. She has a career-high ITF junior combined ranking of No. 3, achieved on January 27, 2025. She won the girls' doubles titles at the 2025 Australian Open and the 2025 Wimbledon Championships.

== Early life ==
Penickova was born in Campbell, California, to Tomáš Pěnička and Olga Hostáková. Her parents are both former tennis players from the Czech Republic; her father was ranked as high as No. 884 by the ATP. Her uncle is former Czech ice hockey player Martin Hosták. Her grandparents live in Hradec Králové.

Her identical twin sister, Annika, also plays tennis. Both sisters are coached by their father. They began their careers at Bay Club Courtside in Los Gatos, California, and currently live and train at the USTA National Campus in Orlando, Florida.

== Career ==
=== Junior years ===
In October 2022, Penickova made her ITF Juniors debut at the J60 event in Arequipa, where she reached the final. In February 2023, she and her sister reached the doubles semifinals of the Petits As. Later that year, she competed in the girls' 14&U singles tournament of the Wimbledon Championships and was selected to represent the United States at the ITF World Junior Championship in Prostějov. In September 2023, she and her sister reached the girls' doubles quarterfinals of the US Open.

In April 2024, she won the J300 Sarawak Cup in Kuching as the top seed. The following month, unseeded at the French Open, she reached the girls' singles semifinals with wins over Emily Sartz-Lunde, Iva Ivanova, Mia Pohánková, and Rose Marie Nijkamp. Later that year, she and her sister participated in the Garden Cup, an exhibition at Madison Square Garden. She also represented the United States at the Junior Billie Jean King Cup and won the title with Tyra Caterina Grant and Julieta Pareja.

In January 2025, she reached both the girls' singles and doubles finals of the Australian Open; she was the first American to reach the girls' singles final of the tournament since 2012. In the doubles final, she and her sister won in straight sets against Emerson Jones and Hannah Klugman. She lost the singles final to Wakana Sonobe. At the French Open, she and her sister reached the girls' doubles semifinals. At Wimbledon, she and Vendula Valdmannová won the girls' doubles title, defeating compatriots Thea Frodin and Julieta Pareja in the final. The following month, she paired with Frodin to win the girls' doubles title at the USTA Girls 18s National Championships in San Diego. Later that year, she finished runner-up at the ITF Junior Finals in Chengdu.

=== Professional ===
In August 2024, Penickova received a wildcard into the women's singles qualifying competition of the US Open, but lost in the first round. In March 2025, she received a wildcard into the qualifying of the Indian Wells Open. Two months later, she reached her first professional singles and doubles finals at the W15 Magic Hotel Tours series in Monastir. In doubles, she and her sister won the title defeating Arina Arifullina and Inês Murta in the final. In singles, she lost to Laïa Petretic.

== Performance timelines ==
Key
W	F	SF	QF	#R	RR	Q#	DNQ	A	NH

(W) winner; (F) finalist; (SF) semifinalist; (QF) quarterfinalist; (#R) rounds 4, 3, 2, 1; (RR) round-robin stage; (Q#) qualification round; (DNQ) did not qualify; (A) absent; (NH) not held; (SR) strike rate (events won / competed); (W–L) win–loss record.
To avoid confusion and double counting, these charts are updated at the conclusion of a tournament or when the player's participation has ended.

Only main-draw results in WTA Tour, Grand Slam tournaments, Billie Jean King Cup, United Cup, Hopman Cup and Olympic Games are included in win–loss records.

=== Singles ===
Current through the 2026 US Open.

Tournament	2024	2025	2026	SR	W–L
Grand Slam tournaments
Australian Open	A	A	A	0 / 0	0–0
French Open	A	A	A	0 / 0	0–0
Wimbledon	A	A	A	0 / 0	0–0
US Open	Q1	Q1	Q2	0 / 0	0–0
Win–loss	0–0	0–0	0–0	0 / 0	0–0
WTA 1000 tournaments
Indian Wells Open	A	Q1	A	0 / 0	0–0
Win–loss	0–0	0–0	0–0	0 / 0	0–0

=== Doubles ===
Current through the 2025 US Open.

Tournament	2025	SR	W–L
Grand Slam tournaments
Australian Open	A	0 / 0	0–0
French Open	A	0 / 0	0–0
Wimbledon	A	0 / 0	0–0
US Open	1R	0 / 1	0–1
Win–loss	0–1	0 / 1	0–1

== ITF Circuit finals ==
=== Singles: 2 (2 runner-ups) ===
Legend W15 tournaments (0–2)	Finals by surface Hard (0–2)

Result	W–L	Date	Tournament	Tier	Surface	Opponent	Score
Loss	0–1	May 2025	ITF Monastir, Tunisia	W15	Hard	(France) Laïa Petretic	3–6, 7–5, 1–6
Loss	0–2	Jun 2026	ITF Lakewood, United States	W15	Hard	(Japan) Mayu Crossley	4–6, 3–6

=== Doubles: 8 (6 titles, 2 runner-ups) ===
Legend W100 tournaments (0–1) W35 tournaments (3–1) W15 tournaments (3–0)	Finals by surface Hard (6–2)

Result	W–L	Date	Tournament	Tier	Surface	Partner	Opponents	Score
Win	1–0	May 2025	ITF Monastir, Tunisia	W15	Hard	(United States) Annika Penickova	Arina Arifullina (Portugal) Inês Murta	6–4, 6–4
Win	2–0	May 2025	ITF Monastir, Tunisia (2)	W15	Hard	(United States) Annika Penickova	(Egypt) Lamis Alhussein Abdel Aziz (Ukraine) Kateryna Lazarenko	7–5, 6–2
Loss	2–1	Oct 2025	ITF Huzhou, China	W35	Hard	Rada Zolotareva	(China) Huang Yujia (China) Zhang Ying	2–6, 4–6
Win	3–1	Jun 2026	ITF Los Angeles, United States	W15	Hard	(United States) Capucine Jauffret	(United States) Salma Ewing (Canada) Alexandra Vagramov	4–6, 6–2, [10–8]
Win	4–1	Jul 2026	ITF Santa Fe, United States	W35	Hard	(United States) Annika Penickova	(Spain) Carolina Gómez (Republic of Ireland) Celine Simunyu	6–3, 6–3
Win	5–1	Jul 2026	ITF Florence, United States	W35	Hard	(United States) Annika Penickova	(United States) Alyssa Ahn (India) Krisha Mahendran	6–3, 6–3
Loss	5–2	Oct 2026	Christus Health Pro Challenge, United States	W100	Hard	(United States) Kylie Collins	(United States) Savannah Broadus (United States) Allura Zamarripa	6–7^{(5)}, 0–6
Win	6–2	Nov 2026	ITF Orlando, United States	W35	Hard	(United States) Annika Penickova	(United States) Julia Adams (Romania) Briana Szabó	6–4, 6–1

== Junior Grand Slam tournament finals ==
=== Singles: 1 (runner-up) ===
Result	Year	Tournament	Surface	Opponent	Score
Loss	2025	Australian Open	Hard	(Japan) Wakana Sonobe	0–6, 1–6

=== Doubles: 3 (3 titles) ===
Result	Year	Tournament	Surface	Partner	Opponents	Score
Win	2025	Australian Open	Hard	(United States) Annika Penickova	(Australia) Emerson Jones (United Kingdom) Hannah Klugman	6–4, 6–2
Win	2025	Wimbledon	Grass	(Czech Republic) Vendula Valdmannová	(United States) Thea Frodin (United States) Julieta Pareja	6–4, 6–2
Win	2026	US Open	Hard	(United States) Annika Penickova	Polina Berezina; Alisa Terentyeva	7–6^{(13–11)}, 6–3
