= 2026 US Open – Wheelchair men's doubles =

Tennis championship

Wheelchair men's doubles
- 2026 US Open

Final
- Champions: (United Kingdom) Alfie Hewett (United Kingdom) Gordon Reid
- Runners-up: (Spain) Martín de la Puente (Netherlands) Ruben Spaargaren
- Score: 2–6, 6–3, [10–7]
- Date: September 11, 2026

Details
- Draw: 8
- Seeds: 2

Events
Singles	men	women		boys	girls
Doubles	men	women	mixed	boys	girls
WC Singles	men	women	quad	boys	girls
WC Doubles	men	women	quad	boys	girls
- US Open

Alfie Hewett and Gordon Reid defeated Martín de la Puente and Ruben Spaargaren in the final, 2–6, 6–3, [10–7] to win the men's doubles wheelchair tennis title at the 2026 US Open.

Gustavo Fernández and Tokito Oda were the defending champions, but lost in the semifinals to Hewett and Reid.

== Seeds ==
1. (United Kingdom) Alfie Hewett / (United Kingdom) Gordon Reid (champions)
2. (Spain) Martín de la Puente / (Netherlands) Ruben Spaargaren (final)

== Draw ==
Key

- Q = Qualifier
- WC = Wild card
- LL = Lucky loser
- Alt = Alternate
- ITF = ITF entry
- PR = Protected ranking
- SR = Special ranking
- SE = Special exempt
- JE = Junior exempt
- JR = Junior Accelerator Programme entrant
- CO = College Accelerator Programme entrant
- NG = Next Gen Accelerator Program entrant
- w/o = Walkover
- r = Retired
- d = Defaulted

=== Finals ===
Quarterfinals
1	(United Kingdom) Alfie Hewett (United Kingdom) Gordon Reid	6	6
(China) Ji Zhenxu (France) Stéphane Houdet	3	1
(Spain) Daniel Caverzaschi (Netherlands) Maarten ter Hofte	0	1
(Argentina) Gustavo Fernández (Japan) Tokito Oda	6	6
(Netherlands) Tom Egberink (United States) Conner Stroud	6	6
(United States) Casey Ratzlaff (United States) Charlie Cooper	3	2
(Israel) Sergei Lysov (Japan) Takuya Miki	1	6	[6]
2	(Spain) Martín de la Puente (Netherlands) Ruben Spaargaren	6	4	[10]

Semifinals
1	(United Kingdom) Alfie Hewett (United Kingdom) Gordon Reid	4	6	[10]
(Argentina) Gustavo Fernández (Japan) Tokito Oda	6	3	[7]
(Netherlands) Tom Egberink (United States) Conner Stroud	1	2
2	(Spain) Martín de la Puente (Netherlands) Ruben Spaargaren	6	6

Final
1	(United Kingdom) Alfie Hewett (United Kingdom) Gordon Reid	2	6	[10]
2	(Spain) Martín de la Puente (Netherlands) Ruben Spaargaren	6	3	[7]
