= Annika Penickova =

American tennis player (born 2009)

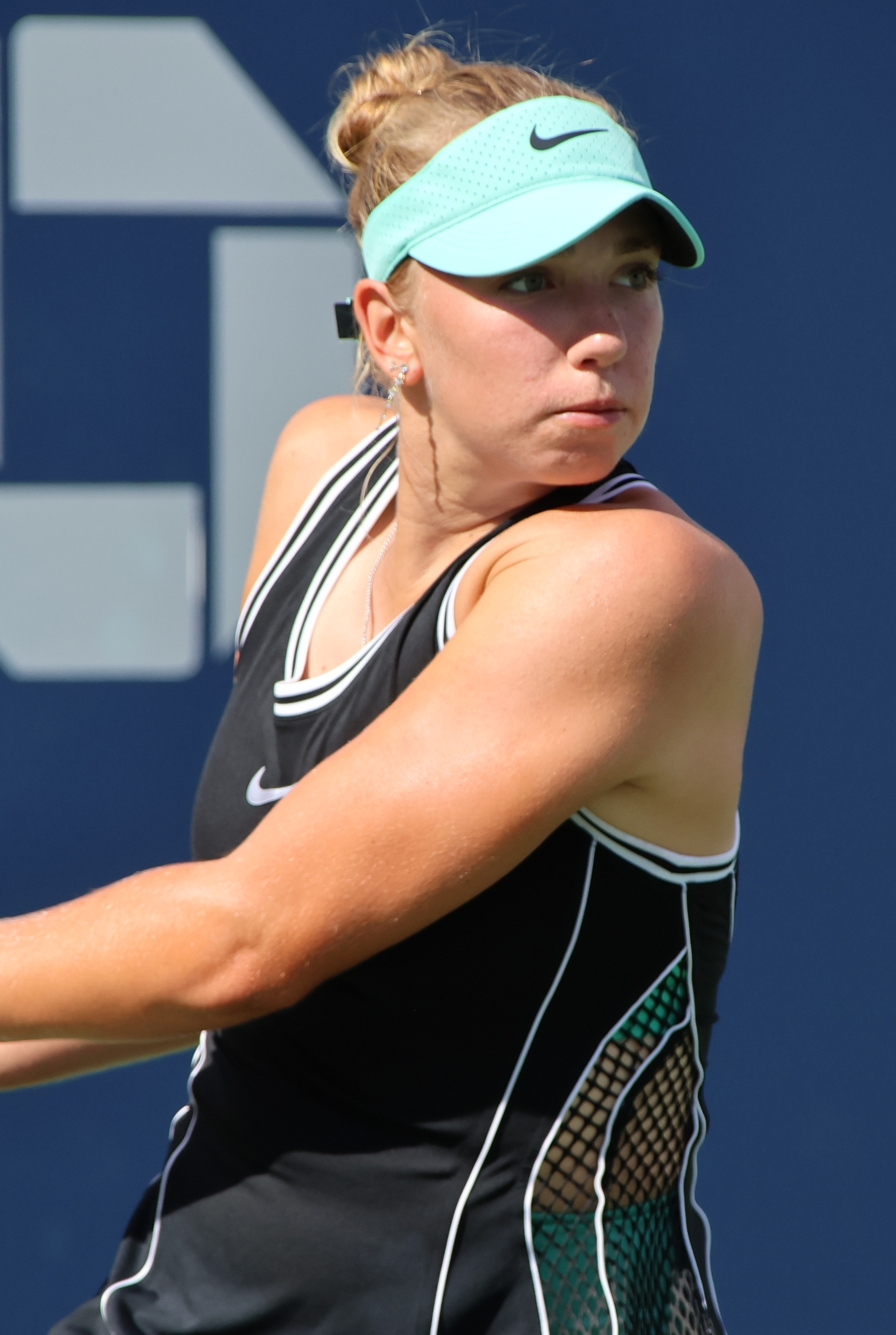
- Penickova at the 2026 US Open
- Country (sports): United States
- Born: September 11, 2009 (age 17) Campbell, California, US
- Plays: Left (two-handed backhand)
- Coach: Tomáš Pěnička
- Prize money: $11,842

Singles
- Career record: 34–19
- Career titles: 0
- Highest ranking: No. 900 (May 18, 2026)
- Current ranking: No. 909 (June 29, 2026)

Grand Slam singles results
- US Open: Q1 (2026)
- Australian Open Junior: 1R (2025)
- French Open Junior: 1R (2025)
- Wimbledon Junior: 2R (2024)
- US Open Junior: QF (2024)

Doubles
- Career record: 14–5
- Career titles: 3 ITF
- Highest ranking: No. 866 (May 18, 2026)
- Current ranking: No. 1,001 (June 29, 2026)

Grand Slam doubles results
- US Open: 1R (2026)
- Australian Open Junior: W (2025)
- French Open Junior: SF (2025)
- Wimbledon Junior: 1R (2024)
- US Open Junior: W (2026)
- Last updated on: July 7, 2026.

Annika Penickova (born September 11, 2009) is an American tennis player. She has a career-high combined ITF junior ranking of No. 16, achieved on 3 March 2025. She and her identical twin sister, Kristina Penickova, won the girls' doubles title at the 2025 Australian Open.

== Early life ==
Penickova was born in Campbell, California, to Tomáš Pěnička and Olga Hostáková. Her parents are both former tennis players from the Czech Republic; her father was ranked as high as No. 884 by the ATP. Her uncle is former Czech ice hockey player Martin Hosták. Her grandparents live in Hradec Králové.

Her identical twin sister, Kristina, also plays tennis. Both sisters are coached by their father. They began their careers at Bay Club Courtside in Los Gatos, California, and currently live and train at the USTA National Campus in Orlando, Florida.

== Career ==
=== Junior years ===
In February 2023, Penickova and her sister reached the doubles semifinals of the Petits As. Later that year, she competed in the girls' 14&U singles tournament of the Wimbledon Championships and was selected to represent the United States at the ITF World Junior Championship in Prostějov. In September 2023, she and her sister reached the girls' doubles quarterfinals of the US Open.

In September 2024, she reached the girls' singles quarterfinals of the US Open, upsetting fifth seed Jeline Vandromme in the process. Later that year, she and her sister participated in the Garden Cup, an exhibition at Madison Square Garden.

In January 2025, she and her sister reached the girls' doubles final of the Australian Open, where they won the title with a straight-sets win over Emerson Jones and Hannah Klugman. At the French Open, she and her sister reached the girls' doubles semifinals. At the 2026 US Open, she and her sister defeated the second seed pairing Victoria Luiza Barros and Naná Silva in straight sets without the loss of a single game on their way to the final.

== Professional ==
In May 2025, Penickova won her first professional doubles title at the W15 Magic Hotel Tours series in Monastir, partnering her sister and defeating Arina Arifullina and Inês Murta in the final.

== ITF Circuit finals ==
=== Singles: 4 (1 title, 3 runner-ups) ===
Legend W35 tournaments (1–2) W15 tournaments (0–1)	Finals by surface Hard (1–3)

Result	W–L	Date	Tournament	Tier	Surface	Opponent	Score
Loss	0–1	Oct 2025	ITF Hilton Head Island, United States	W15	Hard	(United States) Kennedy Drenser-Hagmann	1–6, 6–2, 4–6
Win	1–1	Jul 2026	ITF Florence, United States	W35	Hard	(United States) Piper Charney	6–3, 6–4
Loss	1–2	Aug 2026	ITF Southaven, United States	W35	Hard	(Peru) Dana Guzmán	2–6, 4–6
Loss	1–3	Oct 2026	ITF Redding, United States	W35	Hard	(United States) Connie Ma	5–7, 2–6

=== Doubles: 6 (6 titles) ===
Legend
W25/35 tournaments (4–0)
W15 tournaments (2–0)

Result	W–L	Date	Tournament	Tier	Surface	Partner	Opponents	Score
Win	1–0	May 2025	ITF Monastir, Tunisia	W15	Hard	(United States) Kristina Penickova	Arina Arifullina (Portugal) Inês Murta	6–4, 6–4
Win	2–0	May 2025	ITF Monastir, Tunisia (2)	W15	Hard	(United States) Kristina Penickova	(Egypt) Lamis Alhussein Abdel Aziz (Ukraine) Kateryna Lazarenko	7–5, 6–2
Win	3–0	May 2026	ITF Boca Raton, United States	W35	Clay	(United States) Capucine Jauffret	(United States) Dasha Ivanova (Canada) Alexandra Vagramov	6–1, 6–2
Win	4–0	Jul 2026	ITF Santa Fe, United States	W35	Hard	(United States) Kristina Penickova	(Spain) Carolina Gómez (Republic of Ireland) Celine Simunyu	6–3, 6–3
Win	5–0	Jul 2026	ITF Florence, United States	W35	Hard	(United States) Kristina Penickova	(United States) Alyssa Ahn (India) Krisha Mahendran	6–3, 6–3
Win	6–0	Nov 2026	ITF Orlando, United States	W35	Hard	(United States) Kristina Penickova	(United States) Julia Adams (Romania) Briana Szabó	6–4, 6–1

== Junior Grand Slam tournament finals ==
=== Doubles: 2 (2 titles) ===
Result	Year	Tournament	Surface	Partner	Opponents	Score
Win	2025	Australian Open	Hard	(United States) Kristina Penickova	(Australia) Emerson Jones (United Kingdom) Hannah Klugman	6–4, 6–2
Win	2026	US Open	Hard	(United States) Kristina Penickova	Polina Berezina; Alisa Terentyeva	7–6^{(13–11)}, 6–3
