= 2026 US Open – Boys' doubles =

Tennis championship

Boys' doubles
- 2026 US Open

Final
- Champions: (France) Aaron Gabet (Spain) Valentín González-Galiño
- Runners-up: (United States) Tanishk Konduri (United States) Marcel Latak
- Score: 7–6^{(7–5)}, 2–6, [11–9]
- Date: September 12, 2026

Details
- Draw: 32
- Seeds: 8

Events
| Singles | men | women | | boys | girls |
| Doubles | men | women | mixed | boys | girls |
| WC Singles | men | women | quad | boys | girls |
| WC Doubles | men | women | quad | boys | girls |
- US Open

Aaron Gabet and Valentín González-Galiño won the boys' doubles title at the 2026 US Open, defeating Tanishk Konduri and Marcel Latak in the final, 7–6^{(7–5)}, 2–6, [11–9].

Keaton Hance and Jack Kennedy were the defending champions, but lost in the first round to Mark Ceban and Rhys Lawlor.

== Seeds ==
1. (Brazil) Guto Miguel / (Slovenia) Žiga Šeško (quarterfinals, withdrew)
2. (United States) Keaton Hance / (United States) Jack Kennedy (first round)
3. (United States) Michael Antonius / (United States) Jordan Lee (first round)
4. (Germany) Jamie Mackenzie / (Germany) Vincent Reisach (first round)
5. (Austria) Thilo Behrmann / (Israel) Dan Brand (second round)
6. (France) Yannick Theodor Alexandrescou / (Japan) Ryo Tabata (second round)
7. (France) Mathys Domenc / (France) Daniel Jade (first round)
8. (Spain) Tito Chávez / (Argentina) Dante Pagani (first round)

== Draw ==
Key

- Q = Qualifier
- WC = Wild card
- LL = Lucky loser
- Alt = Alternate
- ITF = ITF entry
- PR = Protected ranking
- SR = Special ranking
- SE = Special exempt
- JE = Junior exempt
- JR = Junior Accelerator Programme entrant
- CO = College Accelerator Programme entrant
- NG = Next Gen Accelerator Program entrant
- w/o = Walkover
- r = Retired
- d = Defaulted

=== Finals ===
Semifinals
(United States) Tanishk Konduri (United States) Marcel Latak | 6 | 6^{6} | [10]
(United States) Safir Azam (Kazakhstan) Damir Zhalgasbay | 3 | 7^{8} | [5]
(France) Aaron Gabet (Spain) Valentín González-Galiño | 6 | 6
(United Kingdom) Mark Ceban (United Kingdom) Rhys Lawlor | 4 | 4

Final
(United States) Tanishk Konduri (United States) Marcel Latak | 6^{5} | 6 | [9]
(France) Aaron Gabet (Spain) Valentín González-Galiño | 7^{7} | 2 | [11]

=== Top half ===
First round
1 | (Brazil) Guto Miguel (Slovenia) Žiga Šeško | 6 | 7
(Italy) Filippo Alfano (Italy) Raffaele Ciurnelli | 3 | 5
WC | (United States) Teodor Davidov (United States) Tyler Lee | 6 | 3 | [10]
(Brazil) Pedro Henrique Chabalgoity (Brazil) Leonardo Storck França | 4 | 6 | [7]
(Australia) Daniel Jovanovski (Germany) Oliver Majdanzic | 4 | 3
(United States) Tanishk Konduri (United States) Marcel Latak | 6 | 6
(Nigeria) Oluwaseun Peter Ogunsakin (Botswana) Ntungamili Raguin | 3 | 4
6 | (France) Yannick Theodor Alexandrescou (Japan) Ryo Tabata | 6 | 6
3 | (United States) Michael Antonius (United States) Jordan Lee | 3 | 5
(Japan) Hyu Kawanishi (Japan) Kanta Watanabe | 6 | 7
(United States) Safir Azam (Kazakhstan) Damir Zhalgasbay | 6 | 6
(Thailand) Kunanan Pantaratorn (India) Arnav Vijay Paparkar | 4 | 2
WC | (United States) Kayden Colombo (United States) Jerrid Gaines Jr. | 6 | 1 | [10]
(Puerto Rico) Yannik Álvarez (United States) Ryan Cozad | 3 | 6 | [12]
(South Africa) Connor Doig (Bulgaria) Dimitar Kisimov | 3 | 4
5 | (Austria) Thilo Behrmann (Israel) Dan Brand | 6 | 6

Second round
1 | (Brazil) G Miguel (Slovenia) Z Šeško | 6 | 6
WC | (United States) T Davidov (United States) T Lee | 2 | 2
(United States) T Konduri (United States) M Latak | 6 | 6
6 | (France) YT Alexandrescou (Japan) R Tabata | 2 | 2
(Japan) H Kawanishi (Japan) K Watanabe | 7^{8} | 6^{4} | [5]
(United States) S Azam (Kazakhstan) D Zhalgasbay | 6^{6} | 7^{7} | [10]
(Puerto Rico) Y Álvarez (United States) R Cozad | 6 | 6
5 | (Austria) T Behrmann (Israel) D Brand | 2 | 2

Quarterfinals
1 | (Brazil) G Miguel (Slovenia) Z Šeško
(United States) T Konduri (United States) M Latak | w/o
(United States) S Azam (Kazakhstan) D Zhalgasbay | 6 | 6^{14} | [10]
(Puerto Rico) Y Álvarez (United States) R Cozad | 3 | 7^{16} | [6]

Semifinals
(United States) T Konduri (United States) M Latak | 6 | 6^{6} | [10]
(United States) S Azam (Kazakhstan) D Zhalgasbay | 3 | 7^{8} | [5]

=== Bottom half ===
First round
7 | (France) Mathys Domenc (France) Daniel Jade | 4 | 6 | [5]
(Czech Republic) Jakub Kusý (Hong Kong) Kai Thompson | 6 | 3 | [10]
WC | (United States) Daniel Malacek (United States) Kamil Stolarczyk | 3 | 6 | [10]
(Ecuador) Emilio Camacho; Kirill Filaretov | 6 | 3 | [7]
(France) Aaron Gabet (Spain) Valentín González-Galiño | 7^{7} | 6
WC | (United States) Gavin Goode (United States) Griffin Goode | 6^{5} | 3
(Japan) Koki Nara (Japan) Yoshihiro Sakurai | 6 | 1 | [10]
4 | (Germany) Jamie Mackenzie (Germany) Vincent Reisach | 4 | 6 | [7]
8 | (Spain) Tito Chávez (Argentina) Dante Pagani | 5 | 7^{7} | [10]
(United States) Vihaan Reddy (United States) Mason Vaughan | 7 | 6^{3} | [12]
(Canada) Benjamin Azar (Romania) Matei Victor Chelemen | 6 | 6
(Colombia) Juan Miguel Bolívar Idárraga (United States) Andrew Johnson | 4 | 3
(Peru) Nicolás Baena (Brazil) Francisco Fontes D'Amorim | 7 | 6
(Italy) Matteo Gribaldo (Italy) Simone Massellani | 5 | 2
(United Kingdom) Mark Ceban (United Kingdom) Rhys Lawlor | 2 | 6 | [10]
2 | (United States) Keaton Hance (United States) Jack Kennedy | 6 | 1 | [7]

Second round
(Czech Republic) J Kusý (Hong Kong) K Thompson | 6^{4} | 3
WC | (United States) D Malacek (United States) K Stolarczyk | 7^{7} | 6
(France) A Gabet (Spain) V González-Galiño | 7 | 7^{7}
(Japan) K Nara (Japan) Y Sakurai | 5 | 6^{4}
(United States) V Reddy (United States) M Vaughan | 6 | 6
(Canada) B Azar (Romania) MV Chelemen | 4 | 3
(Peru) N Baena (Brazil) F Fontes D'Amorim | 3 | 4
(United Kingdom) M Ceban (United Kingdom) R Lawlor | 6 | 6

Quarterfinals
WC | (United States) D Malacek (United States) K Stolarczyk | 2 | 6 | [7]
(France) A Gabet (Spain) V González-Galiño | 6 | 3 | [10]
(United States) V Reddy (United States) M Vaughan | 3 | 3
(United Kingdom) M Ceban (United Kingdom) R Lawlor | 6 | 6

Semifinals
(France) A Gabet (Spain) V González-Galiño | 6 | 6
(United Kingdom) M Ceban (United Kingdom) R Lawlor | 4 | 4
