= 2026 US Open – Wheelchair women's singles =

Tennis championship

Wheelchair women's singles
- 2026 US Open

Final
- Champion: (Japan) Yui Kamiji
- Runner-up: (Netherlands) Diede de Groot
- Score: 6–2, 1–6, 6–3
- Date: September 12, 2026

Details
- Draw: 16
- Seeds: 4

Events
Singles	men	women		boys	girls
Doubles	men	women	mixed	boys	girls
WC Singles	men	women	quad	boys	girls
WC Doubles	men	women	quad	boys	girls
- US Open

Defending champion Yui Kamiji defeated Diede de Groot in the final, 6–2, 1–6, 6–3 to win the women's singles wheelchair tennis title at the 2026 US Open. It was her fourth US Open singles title and 13th major singles title overall. It was the pair's eighth meeting in the US Open final, and marked Kamiji's eleventh consecutive US Open final.

== Seeds ==
1. (Japan) Yui Kamiji (champion)
2. (Netherlands) Diede de Groot (final)
3. (China) Li Xiaohui (first round)
4. (Netherlands) Aniek van Koot (semifinals)

== Draw ==
Key

- Q = Qualifier
- WC = Wild card
- LL = Lucky loser
- Alt = Alternate
- ITF = ITF entry
- PR = Protected ranking
- SR = Special ranking
- SE = Special exempt
- JE = Junior exempt
- JR = Junior Accelerator Programme entrant
- CO = College Accelerator Programme entrant
- NG = Next Gen Accelerator Program entrant
- w/o = Walkover
- r = Retired
- d = Defaulted

=== Draw ===
First round
1	(Japan) Yui Kamiji	6	6
(Japan) Momoko Ohtani	3	2
(Netherlands) Jiske Griffioen	1	2
(Colombia) Angélica Bernal	6	6
4	(Netherlands) Aniek van Koot	6	6
(China) Guo Luoyao	1	4
(South Africa) Kgothatso Montjane	5	1
(China) Zhu Zhenzhen	7	6
(France) Ksénia Chasteau	6	6
WC	(United States) Maylee Phelps	2	1
(China) Wang Ziying	7^{7}	6
3	(China) Li Xiaohui	6^{2}	0
(Netherlands) Jinte Bos	6	6
WC	(United States) Sabina Czauz	2	2
(Netherlands) Lizzy de Greef	1	6	2
2	(Netherlands) Diede de Groot	6	3	6

Quarterfinals
1	(Japan) Y Kamiji	6	6
(Colombia) A Bernal	3	2
4	(Netherlands) A van Koot	6	6
(China) Z Zhu	4	3
(France) K Chasteau	6	4	6
(China) Z Wang	4	6	4
(Netherlands) J Bos	2	2
2	(Netherlands) D de Groot	6	6

Semifinals
1	(Japan) Y Kamiji	7	6
4	(Netherlands) A van Koot	5	0
(France) K Chasteau	3	1
2	(Netherlands) D de Groot	6	6

Final
1	(Japan) Y Kamiji	6	1	6
2	(Netherlands) D de Groot	2	6	3
