= 2026 US Open – Wheelchair men's singles =

Tennis championship

Wheelchair men's singles
- 2026 US Open

Final
- Champion: (United Kingdom) Alfie Hewett
- Runner-up: (Japan) Tokito Oda
- Score: 6–0, 7–6^{(7–5)}
- Date: September 12, 2026

Details
- Draw: 16
- Seeds: 4

Events
Singles	men	women		boys	girls
Doubles	men	women	mixed	boys	girls
WC Singles	men	women	quad	boys	girls
WC Doubles	men	women	quad	boys	girls
- US Open

Alfie Hewett defeated defending champion Tokito Oda in the final, 6–0, 7–6^{(7–5)} to win the men's singles wheelchair tennis title at the 2026 US Open. It was his fifth US Open singles title and eleventh major singles title overall. Oda was seeking to complete the Grand Slam, and his defeat ended his streak of major singles titles at six.

== Seeds ==
1. (Japan) Tokito Oda (final)
2. (United Kingdom) Alfie Hewett (champion)
3. (Spain) Martín de la Puente (semifinals)
4. (Argentina) Gustavo Fernández (semifinals)

== Draw ==
Key

- Q = Qualifier
- WC = Wild card
- LL = Lucky loser
- Alt = Alternate
- ITF = ITF entry
- PR = Protected ranking
- SR = Special ranking
- SE = Special exempt
- JE = Junior exempt
- JR = Junior Accelerator Programme entrant
- CO = College Accelerator Programme entrant
- NG = Next Gen Accelerator Program entrant
- w/o = Walkover
- r = Retired
- d = Defaulted

=== Draw ===
First round
1	(Japan) Tokito Oda	6	6
WC	(United States) Charlie Cooper	0	3
(France) Stéphane Houdet	3	7	2
(United Kingdom) Gordon Reid	6	5	6
3	(Spain) Martín de la Puente	6	6
WC	(United States) Conner Stroud	2	2
(Israel) Sergei Lysov	6	4	4
(Netherlands) Ruben Spaargaren	2	6	6
(Netherlands) Tom Egberink	2	0
(China) Ji Zhenxu	6	6
(Japan) Takuya Miki	2	1^{r}
4	(Argentina) Gustavo Fernández	6	2
(United States) Casey Ratzlaff	4	6	7
(Netherlands) Maarten ter Hofte	6	3	5
(Spain) Daniel Caverzaschi	0	2
2	(United Kingdom) Alfie Hewett	6	6

Quarterfinals
1	(Japan) T Oda	6	6
(United Kingdom) G Reid	1	0
3	(Spain) M de la Puente	6	6
(Netherlands) R Spaargaren	4	1
(China) Z Ji	1	6	4
4	(Argentina) G Fernández	6	3	6
(United States) C Ratzlaff	2	0
2	(United Kingdom) A Hewett	6	6

Semifinals
1	(Japan) T Oda	6	6
3	(Spain) M de la Puente	4	4
4	(Argentina) G Fernández	0	0^{r}
2	(United Kingdom) A Hewett	6	3

Final
1	(Japan) T Oda	0	6^{5}
2	(United Kingdom) A Hewett	6	7^{7}
