= Jin Woodman =

Wheelchair tennis player

- Country (sports): Australia
- Residence: Sunbury, Victoria, Australia
- Born: 1 May 2009 (age 17) China
- Plays: Right-handed

Singles
- Highest ranking: No. 4 (16 March 2026)
- Current ranking: No. 5 (31 August 2026)

Grand Slam singles results
- Australian Open: QF (2026)
- French Open: QF (2026)
- Wimbledon: 1R (2026)
- US Open: QF (2025)

Doubles
- Highest ranking: No. 3 (27 April 2026)
- Current ranking: No. 3 (31 August 2026)

Grand Slam doubles results
- Australian Open: SF (2026)
- French Open: F (2026)
- Wimbledon: F (2026)
- US Open: W (2026)

Jin Woodman (born 1 May 2009) is an Australian wheelchair tennis player who competes internationally in the Quad division. He achieved a career-high junior world ranking of No. 1 in January 2025.

He then competed in the senior professional tour circuit. At the 2025 Australian Open, at 15 years of age he became the youngest wheelchair tennis player in history to win a Grand Slam match. He has been a finalist in doubles in both the French Open and the Wimbledon Championships. Woodman reached a professional career-high quad singles ranking of World No. 4, and a quad doubles ranking of World No. 3, during the 2026 season.

== Early life ==
Woodman was born in China on 1 May 2009. He underwent surgery in China to treat club feet.

At three years of age, he was adopted by an Australian family and relocated to Australia. There, he was raised in Sunbury, Victoria, where he still lives.

He enrolled at Maribyrnong College in December 2021, as part of an inclusion initiative targeting future Paralympians for Brisbane 2032. He then joined the Maribyrnong Sports Academy (MSA) in 2022.

== Sacral agenesis and genetic neuromuscular disorder ==
Woodman has sacral agenesis, a rare congenital condition in which the fetal development of the lower spine is abnormal, alongside a progressive genetic neuromuscular disorder diagnosed after he arrived in Australia as either scapuloperoneal spinal muscular atrophy (SPSMA) or Charcot-Marie-Tooth disease Type 2C (CMT2C). The progressive nerve conditions impact his muscles and motor function across both his upper and lower extremities, causing severe multi-limb muscle deterioration. Because of his multi-limb impairment, he is classified to compete in the quad division of wheelchair tennis. After the 2025 Australian summer events, he sustained a severe femur injury when he fell out of his everyday wheelchair in his kitchen, which sidelined him from competition for six months.

== Wheelchair tennis career ==
Woodman began playing tennis at the age of seven, after watching his fellow Australian Dylan Alcott play at the 2015 Australian Open. He ultimately earned a wildcard invitation to his first senior Grand Slam main draw at the age of 15. Making his senior debut at the 2025 Australian Open, he became the youngest wheelchair tennis player in history to win a Grand Slam match, by defeating Heath Davidson of Australia. Woodman reached a career-high junior ranking of world No. 1 on 27 January 2025, a season in which he was also named the International Tennis Federation (ITF) Wheelchair Tennis Junior Boy of the Year.

During 2026, Woodman won the Eastbourne International quad singles championship, defeating Sam Schröder in the semifinals and Ahmet Kaplan in the final. Hethen beatNiels Vink in the semifinals of the tournament in Roehampton. He later advanced to his first grass major final at the 2026 Wimbledon Championships alongside doubles partner Sam Schröder, finishing as the runner-up to Vink and Israeli Guy Sasson.

At the 2026 US Open, Woodman advanced to the finals of the Wheelchair Quad Doubles tournament draw.

As of September 2026, he had achieved a career-high junior world ranking of No. 1, a professional career-high quad singles ranking of World No. 4, and a quad doubles ranking of World No. 3.

== Awards and recognition ==
- MSA Athlete of the Decade (2026): Honored by the Maribyrnong Sports Academy.
- ITF Junior Wheelchair Tennis World No. 1 (January 2025)
- Tennis Victoria Most Outstanding Athlete with a Disability (2025)
- ITF Wheelchair Tennis Junior Boy of the Year (2025)
- Tennis Victoria Male Junior Athlete of the Year (2024)
