= 2026 US Open – Wheelchair girls' singles =

Tennis championship

Wheelchair girls' singles
- 2026 US Open

Final
- Champion: (Japan) Seira Matsuoka
- Runner-up: (Belgium) Luna Gryp
- Score: 7–6^{(7–3)}, 6–3
- Date: September 11, 2026

Details
- Draw: 8
- Seeds: 2

Events
Singles	men	women		boys	girls
Doubles	men	women	mixed	boys	girls
WC Singles	men	women	quad	boys	girls
WC Doubles	men	women	quad	boys	girls
- US Open

Sabina Czauz is the defending champion.

== Seeds ==
1. (Japan) Seira Matsuoka (champion)
2. (Belgium) Luna Gryp (final)

== Draw ==
Key

- Q = Qualifier
- WC = Wild card
- LL = Lucky loser
- Alt = Alternate
- ITF = ITF entry
- PR = Protected ranking
- SR = Special ranking
- SE = Special exempt
- JE = Junior exempt
- JR = Junior Accelerator Programme entrant
- CO = College Accelerator Programme entrant
- NG = Next Gen Accelerator Program entrant
- w/o = Walkover
- r = Retired
- d = Defaulted

=== Draw ===
Quarterfinals
1	(Japan) Seira Matsuoka	6	6
(Brazil) Clara Figueiuredo Kogan	0	0
(United Kingdom) Lucy Foyster	6	6
(Sweden) Emma Gjerseth	2	2
(Colombia) Paula Michelle Lopez Meza	6	4	4
(United States) Lucy Heald	3	6	6
(France) Manon Dayan	4	3
2	(Belgium) Luna Gryp	6	6

Semifinals
1	(Japan) Seira Matsuoka	6	6
(United Kingdom) Lucy Foyster	1	3
(United States) Lucy Heald	1	4
2	(Belgium) Luna Gryp	6	6

Final
1	(Japan) Seira Matsuoka	7^{7}	6
2	(Belgium) Luna Gryp	6^{3}	3
