= 2026 US Open – Wheelchair girls' doubles =

Tennis championship

Wheelchair girls' doubles
- 2026 US Open

Final
- Champions: (Colombia) Paula Michelle López Meza (Japan) Seira Matsuoka
- Runners-up: (Sweden) Emma Gjerseth (United States) Lucy Heald
- Score: 6–4, 6–3
- Date: September 11, 2026

Details
- Draw: 4
- Seeds: 2

Events
Singles	men	women		boys	girls
Doubles	men	women	mixed	boys	girls
WC Singles	men	women	quad	boys	girls
WC Doubles	men	women	quad	boys	girls
- US Open

Sabina Czauz and Seira Matsuoka are the defending champions.

== Seeds ==
1. (Colombia) Paula Michelle López Meza / (Japan) Seira Matsuoka (champions)
2. (Sweden) Emma Gjerseth / (United States) Lucy Heald (final)

== Draw ==
Key

- Q = Qualifier
- WC = Wild card
- LL = Lucky loser
- Alt = Alternate
- ITF = ITF entry
- PR = Protected ranking
- SR = Special ranking
- SE = Special exempt
- JE = Junior exempt
- JR = Junior Accelerator Programme entrant
- CO = College Accelerator Programme entrant
- NG = Next Gen Accelerator Program entrant
- w/o = Walkover
- r = Retired
- d = Defaulted

=== Finals ===
Semifinals
1	(Colombia) Paula Michelle López Meza (Japan) Seira Matsuoka	5	6	[10]
(United Kingdom) Lucy Foyster (Belgium) Luna Gryp	7	3	[8]
(France) Manon Dayan (Brazil) Clara Figueiuredo Kogan	4	1
2	(Sweden) Emma Gjerseth (United States) Lucy Heald	6	6

Final
1	(Colombia) Paula Michelle López Meza (Japan) Seira Matsuoka	6	6
2	(Sweden) Emma Gjerseth (United States) Lucy Heald	4	3
