= 2026 US Open – Girls' doubles =

Tennis championship

Girls' doubles
- 2026 US Open

Final
- Champions: (United States) Annika Penickova (United States) Kristina Penickova
- Runners-up: Polina Berezina; Alisa Terentyeva
- Score: 7–6^{(13–11)}, 6–3
- Date: September 12, 2026

Details
- Draw: 32
- Seeds: 8

Events
Singles	men	women		boys	girls
Doubles	men	women	mixed	boys	girls
WC Singles	men	women	quad	boys	girls
WC Doubles	men	women	quad	boys	girls
- US Open

Annika and Kristina Penickova won the girls' doubles title at the 2026 US Open, defeating Polina Berezina and Alisa Terentyeva in the final, 7–6^{(13–11)}, 6–3.

Alena and Jana Kovačková were the reigning champions, but Alena did not participate this year. Jana, who was attempting to complete a Calendar-Year Grand Slam, partnered Kateřina Zajíčková, but lost in the second round to Maaya Rajeshwaran Revathi and Antonina Sushkova.

== Seeds ==
1. Mariia Makarova / (China) Sun Xinran (semifinals)
2. (Brazil) Victoria Luíza Barros / (Brazil) Nauhany Vitória Leme da Silva (second round)
3. (France) Ksenia Efremova / (Spain) Paola Piñera Celorio (second round)
4. Felitsata Dorofeeva-Rybas / Anna Pushkareva (quarterfinals)
5. (Czech Republic) Jana Kovačková / (Czech Republic) Kateřina Zajíčková (second round)
6. (Spain) Charo Esquiva Bañuls / (Argentina) Sol Ailin Larraya Guidi (second round)
7. (China) Qu Yihan / (China) Shao Yushan (second round)
8. (Jamaica) Alyssa James / (Ukraine) Polina Skliar (quarterfinals)

== Draw ==
Key

- Q = Qualifier
- WC = Wild card
- LL = Lucky loser
- Alt = Alternate
- ITF = ITF entry
- PR = Protected ranking
- SR = Special ranking
- SE = Special exempt
- JE = Junior exempt
- JR = Junior Accelerator Programme entrant
- CO = College Accelerator Programme entrant
- NG = Next Gen Accelerator Program entrant
- w/o = Walkover
- r = Retired
- d = Defaulted

=== Finals ===
Semifinals
1	Mariia Makarova (China) Sun Xinran	2	1
Polina Berezina; Alisa Terentyeva	6	6
(India) Maaya Rajeshwaran Revathi (Ukraine) Antonina Sushkova	6^{3}	2
WC	(United States) Annika Penickova (United States) Kristina Penickova	7^{7}	6

Final
Polina Berezina; Alisa Terentyeva	6^{11}	3
WC	(United States) Annika Penickova (United States) Kristina Penickova	7^{13}	6

=== Top half ===
First round
1	Mariia Makarova (China) Sun Xinran	6	6
(Italy) Ilary Pistola (Brazil) Pietra Rivoli	2	2
WC	(United States) Scarlett Fagan (United States) Margaret Sohns	3	6	[10]
(Canada) Avery Alexander (Hungary) Lujza Béviz	6	3	[7]
(Japan) Kokona Ishii (United States) Natalie Kha	6	5	[10]
(Romania) Maia Ilinca Burcescu (China) Zhang Ruien	4	7	[5]
(United States) Chukwumelije Clarke (United States) Ireland O'Brien	4	3
7	(China) Qu Yihan (China) Shao Yushan	6	6
3	(France) Ksenia Efremova (Spain) Paola Piñera Celorio	6	6
(South Korea) Jeong Ui-su (Chinese Taipei) Lin Yu-chen	1	0
Polina Berezina; Alisa Terentyeva	5	6	[10]
(United States) Isabelle Thi DeLuccia (Argentina) Sofía Meabe	7	4	3
(Australia) Renee Alame (United States) Thea Frodin	6	6
(United States) Hannah Ayrault (United States) Janae Preston	3	3
(Czech Republic) Tereza Hermanová (Serbia) Dušica Popovski	2	3
6	(Spain) Charo Esquiva Bañuls (Argentina) Sol Ailin Larraya Guidi	6	6

Second round
1	M Makarova (China) X Sun	6	6
WC	(United States) S Fagan (United States) M Sohns	4	4
(Japan) K Ishii (United States) N Kha	6	6^{4}	[10]
7	(China) Y Qu (China) Y Shao	1	7^{7}	[7]
3	(France) K Efremova (Spain) P Piñera Celorio	6	4	[6]
P Berezina; A Terentyeva	3	6	[10]
(Australia) R Alame (United States) T Frodin	2	7^{7}	[10]
6	(Spain) C Esquiva Bañuls (Argentina) SA Larraya Guidi	6	6^{2}	[7]

Quarterfinals
1	M Makarova (China) X Sun	6	6
(Japan) K Ishii (United States) N Kha	4	3
P Berezina; A Terentyeva	6	7^{7}
(Australia) R Alame (United States) T Frodin	0	6^{3}

Semifinals
1	M Makarova (China) X Sun	2	1
P Berezina; A Terentyeva	6	6

=== Bottom half ===
First round
5	(Czech Republic) Jana Kovačková (Czech Republic) Kateřina Zajíčková	7	6
(United States) Jordyn Hazelitt (Latvia) Marija Lauva	5	4
WC	(United States) Emery Combs (United States) Olivia De Los Reyes	6	4	[1]
(India) Maaya Rajeshwaran Revathi (Ukraine) Antonina Sushkova	1	6	[10]
(Romania) Maria Valentina Pop (United Kingdom) Hollie Smart	7^{7}	6
(Ukraine) Sofiia Bielinska (Canada) Nadia Lagaev	6^{3}	3
(United States) Olivia Traynor (United States) Anita Tu	3	4
4	Felitsata Dorofeeva-Rybas; Anna Pushkareva	6	6
8	(Jamaica) Alyssa James (Ukraine) Polina Skliar	6	6
(Germany) Emily Victoria Eigelsbach (Austria) Anna Pircher	4	3
WC	(United States) Kennedy Drenser-Hagmann (United States) Carrie-Anne Hoo	6	5	[1]
(United Kingdom) Daniella Britton (Bosnia and Herzegovina) Tea Kovačević	3	7	[10]
WC	(United States) Annika Penickova (United States) Kristina Penickova	6	6
(Netherlands) Fleur de Bresser; Alexandra Malova	3	2
Ekaterina Dotsenko (China) Lin Yujun	4	7	[6]
2	(Brazil) Victoria Luíza Barros (Brazil) Nauhany Vitória Leme da Silva	6	5	[10]

Second round
5	(Czech Republic) J Kovačková (Czech Republic) K Zajíčková	6	2	[7]
(India) M Rajeshwaran Revathi (Ukraine) A Sushkova	2	6	[10]
(Romania) MV Pop (United Kingdom) H Smart	3	2
4	F Dorofeeva-Rybas; A Pushkareva	6	6
8	(Jamaica) A James (Ukraine) P Skliar	6	4	[10]
(United Kingdom) D Britton (Bosnia and Herzegovina) T Kovačević	1	6	[4]
WC	(United States) A Penickova (United States) K Penickova	6	6
2	(Brazil) VL Barros (Brazil) NV Leme da Silva	0	0

Quarterfinals
(India) M Rajeshwaran Revathi (Ukraine) A Sushkova	6	6
4	F Dorofeeva-Rybas; A Pushkareva	4	4
8	(Jamaica) A James (Ukraine) P Skliar	4	4
WC	(United States) A Penickova (United States) K Penickova	6	6

Semifinals
(India) M Rajeshwaran Revathi (Ukraine) A Sushkova	6^{3}	2
WC	(United States) A Penickova (United States) K Penickova	7^{7}	6
