= 2026 US Open – Mixed doubles =

Mixed doubles
- 2026 US Open

Final
- Champions: (Czech Republic) Karolína Muchová (Czech Republic) Jakub Menšík
- Runners-up: (Switzerland) Belinda Bencic (Italy) Flavio Cobolli
- Score: 6–3, 1–6, [10–6]
- Date: August 26, 2026

Details
- Draw: 16
- Seeds: 4

Events
Singles	men	women		boys	girls
Doubles	men	women	mixed	boys	girls
WC Singles	men	women	quad	boys	girls
WC Doubles	men	women	quad	boys	girls
- US Open

Karolína Muchová and Jakub Menšík defeated Belinda Bencic and Flavio Cobolli in the final, 6–3, 1–6, [10–6] to win the mixed doubles tennis title at the 2026 US Open.

Sara Errani and Andrea Vavassori were the two-time defending champions, but lost in the first round to Mirra Andreeva and Andrey Rublev.

== Seeds ==
1. Aryna Sabalenka / (Serbia) Novak Djokovic (first round)
2. (United States) Jessica Pegula / (United States) Taylor Fritz (first round)
3. (United States) Amanda Anisimova / (United States) Learner Tien (first round)
4. (Switzerland) Belinda Bencic / (Italy) Flavio Cobolli (final)

== Draw ==
Key

- Q = Qualifier
- WC = Wild card
- LL = Lucky loser
- Alt = Alternate
- ITF = ITF entry
- PR = Protected ranking
- SR = Special ranking
- SE = Special exempt
- JE = Junior exempt
- JR = Junior Accelerator Programme entrant
- CO = College Accelerator Programme entrant
- NG = Next Gen Accelerator Program entrant
- w/o = Walkover
- r = Retired
- d = Defaulted

First round
1	A Sabalenka (Serbia) N Djokovic	4	2	[2]
Q	(Czech Republic) K Siniaková (United Kingdom) H Patten	1	4	[10]
WC	(Ukraine) E Svitolina (France) G Monfils	4	4
(Philippines) A Eala (Canada) F Auger-Aliassime	1	1
4	(Switzerland) B Bencic (Italy) F Cobolli	4	4
WC	(United States) T Townsend (Germany) A Zverev	2	2
WC	(United States) S Williams (Spain) C Alcaraz	5	4
Q	(New Zealand) E Routliffe (United Kingdom) L Glasspool	3	1
(Czech Republic) K Muchová (Czech Republic) J Menšík	4	2	[10]
LL	(France) K Mladenovic (El Salvador) M Arévalo	1	4	[7]
WC	(United States) E Navarro (United States) T Paul	5	4
3	(United States) A Anisimova (United States) L Tien	3	2
M Andreeva; A Rublev	1	4	[11]
WC	(Italy) S Errani (Italy) A Vavassori	4	1	[9]
WC	D Shnaider (Norway) C Ruud	4	4
2	(United States) J Pegula (United States) T Fritz	2	1

Quarterfinals
Q	(Czech Republic) K Siniaková (United Kingdom) H Patten	4^{6}	5^{7}	[8]
WC	(Ukraine) E Svitolina (France) G Monfils	5^{8}	4^{3}	[10]
4	(Switzerland) B Bencic (Italy) F Cobolli	5^{7}	4
WC	(United States) S Williams (Spain) C Alcaraz	4^{4}	1
(Czech Republic) K Muchová (Czech Republic) J Menšík	4	5
WC	(United States) E Navarro (United States) T Paul	1	3
M Andreeva; A Rublev	4	4^{9}	[10]
WC	D Shnaider (Norway) C Ruud	1	5^{11}	[5]

Semifinals
WC	(Ukraine) E Svitolina (France) G Monfils	5^{9}	1	[5]
4	(Switzerland) B Bencic (Italy) F Cobolli	4^{7}	4	[10]
(Czech Republic) K Muchová (Czech Republic) J Menšík	5^{8}	3	[11]
M Andreeva; A Rublev	4^{6}	5	[9]

Final
4	(Switzerland) B Bencic (Italy) F Cobolli	3	6	[6]
(Czech Republic) K Muchová (Czech Republic) J Menšík	6	1	[10]

== Qualifying ==
Qualifiers were introduced to the format this year to give more doubles specialists a chance to compete in the tournament after their limited presence in the previous edition. Qualification matches took place on August 24. The qualifying draw consists of six direct entries and two wild cards, with two teams earning a spot in the main draw.

=== Seeds ===
1. (Czech Republic) Kateřina Siniaková / (United Kingdom) Henry Patten (qualified)
2. (Canada) Gabriela Dabrowski / (Finland) Harri Heliövaara (first round)
3. (Brazil) Luisa Stefani / (United Kingdom) Neal Skupski (first round)
4. (Serbia) Aleksandra Krunić / (Croatia) Mate Pavić (first round)

=== Qualifiers ===
1. (Czech Republic) Kateřina Siniaková / (United Kingdom) Henry Patten
2. (New Zealand) Erin Routliffe / (United Kingdom) Lloyd Glasspool

=== Lucky losers ===
1. (France) Kristina Mladenovic / (El Salvador) Marcelo Arévalo

=== Qualifying draw ===
==== First qualifier ====
First round
1	(Czech Republic) Kateřina Siniaková (United Kingdom) Henry Patten	4	4
WC	(Germany) Tatjana Maria (Monaco) Valentin Vacherot	1	2
WC	(United States) Peyton Stearns (United States) Christian Harrison	4	4
4	(Serbia) Aleksandra Krunić (Croatia) Mate Pavić	2	1

Qualifying competition
1	(Czech Republic) Kateřina Siniaková (United Kingdom) Henry Patten	4	4
WC	(United States) Peyton Stearns (United States) Christian Harrison	1	2

==== Second qualifier ====
First round
2	(Canada) Gabriela Dabrowski (Finland) Harri Heliövaara	4	1	[8]
(France) Kristina Mladenovic (El Salvador) Marcelo Arévalo	2	4	[10]
(New Zealand) Erin Routliffe (United Kingdom) Lloyd Glasspool	4	3	[10]
3	(Brazil) Luisa Stefani (United Kingdom) Neal Skupski	1	5	[7]

Qualifying competition
(France) Kristina Mladenovic (El Salvador) Marcelo Arévalo	4^{4}	4	[9]
(New Zealand) Erin Routliffe (United Kingdom) Lloyd Glasspool	5^{7}	2	[11]

== Other entry information ==
=== Direct entries ===
16 teams were initially announced as entering the tournament on July 27, with 13 additional entrants being announced on August 3. The following 7 teams received direct entry based on their combined singles rankings as of Monday, August 17; 4 of them were seeded.

- Aryna Sabalenka / (Serbia) Novak Djokovic
- (United States) Jessica Pegula / (United States) Taylor Fritz (Note: Repairing.)
- (United States) Amanda Anisimova / (United States) Learner Tien
- (Switzerland) Belinda Bencic / (Italy) Flavio Cobolli
- (Philippines) Alexandra Eala / (Canada) Félix Auger-Aliassime (Note: Initially entered as a wild card.)
- (Czech Republic) Karolína Muchová / (Czech Republic) Jakub Menšík
- Mirra Andreeva / Andrey Rublev (Note: Initially entered as a qualifying wild card.)

=== Wild cards ===
- (Italy) Sara Errani / (Italy) Andrea Vavassori
- ~~(Canada) Leylah Fernandez / (United States) Frances Tiafoe~~
- (United States) Taylor Townsend / (Germany) Alexander Zverev
- (Ukraine) Elina Svitolina / (France) Gaël Monfils
- (United States) Serena Williams / (Spain) Carlos Alcaraz
- (United States) Emma Navarro / (United States) Tommy Paul
- Diana Shnaider / (Norway) Casper Ruud

=== Qualifiers ===
- (New Zealand) Erin Routliffe / (United Kingdom) Lloyd Glasspool
- (Czech Republic) Kateřina Siniaková / (United Kingdom) Henry Patten

=== Lucky losers ===
- (France) Kristina Mladenovic / (El Salvador) Marcelo Arévalo

=== Withdrawals ===
- (Canada) Leylah Fernandez / (United States) Frances Tiafoe → replaced by (France) Kristina Mladenovic / (El Salvador) Marcelo Arévalo (LL)
- (United States) Jessica Pegula / (United Kingdom) Jack Draper → replaced by (United States) Jessica Pegula / (United States) Taylor Fritz
- (Kazakhstan) Elena Rybakina / (United States) Taylor Fritz → replaced by (United States) Jessica Pegula / (United States) Taylor Fritz
- Diana Shnaider / Daniil Medvedev → replaced by Diana Shnaider / (Norway) Casper Ruud
- (Poland) Iga Świątek / (Norway) Casper Ruud → replaced by Diana Shnaider / (Norway) Casper Ruud
