= 2026 US Open – Wheelchair women's doubles =

Tennis championship

Wheelchair women's doubles
- 2026 US Open

Final
- Champions: (Japan) Yui Kamiji (China) Zhu Zhenzhen
- Runners-up: (China) Guo Luoyao (Japan) Momoko Ohtani
- Score: 6–1, 6–2
- Date: September 11, 2026

Details
- Draw: 8
- Seeds: 2

Events
| Singles | men | women | | boys | girls |
| Doubles | men | women | mixed | boys | girls |
| WC Singles | men | women | quad | boys | girls |
| WC Doubles | men | women | quad | boys | girls |
- US Open

Yui Kamiji and Zhu Zhenzhen defeated Guo Luoyao and Momoko Ohtani in the final, 6–1, 6–2 to win the women's doubles wheelchair tennis title at the 2026 US Open.

Li Xiaohui and Wang Ziying were the defending champions, but lost in the semifinals to Guo and Ohtani.

== Seeds ==
1. (Japan) Yui Kamiji / (China) Zhu Zhenzhen (champions)
2. (China) Li Xiaohui / (China) Wang Ziying (semifinals)

== Draw ==
Key

- Q = Qualifier
- WC = Wild card
- LL = Lucky loser
- Alt = Alternate
- ITF = ITF entry
- PR = Protected ranking
- SR = Special ranking
- SE = Special exempt
- JE = Junior exempt
- JR = Junior Accelerator Programme entrant
- CO = College Accelerator Programme entrant
- NG = Next Gen Accelerator Program entrant
- w/o = Walkover
- r = Retired
- d = Defaulted

=== Finals ===
Quarterfinals
1 | (Japan) Yui Kamiji (China) Zhu Zhenzhen | 6 | 6
WC | (United States) Sabina Czauz (United States) Maylee Phelps | 0 | 0
(Netherlands) Jinte Bos (Netherlands) Lizzy de Greef | 7^{7} | 5 | [10]
(Colombia) Angélica Bernal (France) Ksénia Chasteau | 6^{1} | 7 | [5]
(China) Guo Luoyao (Japan) Momoko Ohtani | 6 | 4 | [10]
(Netherlands) Aniek van Koot (Netherlands) Diede de Groot | 3 | 6 | [3]
(Netherlands) Jiske Griffioen (South Africa) Kgothatso Montjane | 3 | 6 | [4]
2 | (China) Li Xiaohui (China) Wang Ziying | 6 | 1 | [10]

Semifinals
1 | (Japan) Yui Kamiji (China) Zhu Zhenzhen | 6 | 6
(Netherlands) Jinte Bos (Netherlands) Lizzy de Greef | 4 | 1
(China) Guo Luoyao (Japan) Momoko Ohtani | 5 | 6 | [11]
2 | (China) Li Xiaohui (China) Wang Ziying | 7 | 3 | [9]

Final
1 | (Japan) Yui Kamiji (China) Zhu Zhenzhen | 6 | 6
(China) Guo Luoyao (Japan) Momoko Ohtani | 1 | 2
