= 2026 US Open – Men's doubles =

Tennis championship

Men's doubles
- 2026 US Open

Final
- Champions: (United States) Christian Harrison (United Kingdom) Neal Skupski
- Runners-up: (Germany) Kevin Krawietz (Germany) Tim Pütz
- Score: 6–4, 7–6^{(8–6)}
- Date: September 12, 2026

Details
- Draw: 64
- Seeds: 16

Events
Singles	men	women		boys	girls
Doubles	men	women	mixed	boys	girls
WC Singles	men	women	quad	boys	girls
WC Doubles	men	women	quad	boys	girls
- US Open

Christian Harrison and Neal Skupski defeated Kevin Krawietz and Tim Pütz in the final, 6–4, 7–6^{(8–6)} to win the men's doubles tennis title at the 2026 US Open. It was Skupski's third major title and Harrison's second, as well as their second major as a team this year, following the Australian Open. They did not drop a set en route to the title.

Marcel Granollers and Horacio Zeballos were the defending champions, but lost in the quarterfinals to Rajeev Ram and Joe Salisbury, in what was both of their final professional appearances. The former world No. 1s, two-time ATP Finals champions, four-time major champions, and three-time US Open champions lost in the semifinals to Krawietz and Pütz.

== Seeds ==
1. (Finland) Harri Heliövaara / (United Kingdom) Henry Patten (semifinals)
2. (Spain) Marcel Granollers / (Argentina) Horacio Zeballos (quarterfinals)
3. (El Salvador) Marcelo Arévalo / (Croatia) Mate Pavić (quarterfinals)
4. (Italy) Simone Bolelli / (Italy) Andrea Vavassori (quarterfinals)
5. (United States) Christian Harrison / (United Kingdom) Neal Skupski (champions)
6. (Germany) Kevin Krawietz / (Germany) Tim Pütz (final)
7. (Argentina) Guido Andreozzi / (France) Manuel Guinard (quarterfinals)
8. (Brazil) Orlando Luz / (Brazil) Rafael Matos (first round)
9. (United Kingdom) Julian Cash / (United Kingdom) Lloyd Glasspool (third round)
10. (France) Théo Arribagé / (France) Albano Olivetti (second round)
11. (France) Sadio Doumbia / (France) Fabien Reboul (second round)
12. (Monaco) Hugo Nys / (France) Édouard Roger-Vasselin (third round)
13. (Austria) Lucas Miedler / (Australia) Marc Polmans (third round)
14. (Germany) Constantin Frantzen / (Netherlands) Robin Haase (first round)
15. (United States) Austin Krajicek / (Croatia) Nikola Mektić (third round)
16. (Portugal) Francisco Cabral / (United States) JJ Tracy (third round)

Click on the seed number of a player to go to their draw section.

== Draw ==
Key

- Q = Qualifier
- WC = Wild card
- LL = Lucky loser
- Alt = Alternate
- ITF = ITF entry
- PR = Protected ranking
- SR = Special ranking
- SE = Special exempt
- JE = Junior exempt
- JR = Junior Accelerator Programme entrant
- CO = College Accelerator Programme entrant
- NG = Next Gen Accelerator Program entrant
- w/o = Walkover
- r = Retired
- d = Defaulted

=== Finals ===
Quarterfinals
1	(Finland) Harri Heliövaara (United Kingdom) Henry Patten	6^{7}	7^{7}	6
7	(Argentina) Guido Andreozzi (France) Manuel Guinard	7^{9}	6^{3}	2
4	(Italy) Simone Bolelli (Italy) Andrea Vavassori	3	2
5	(United States) Christian Harrison (United Kingdom) Neal Skupski	6	6
6	(Germany) Kevin Krawietz (Germany) Tim Pütz	6^{4}	6	7^{10}
3	(El Salvador) Marcelo Arévalo (Croatia) Mate Pavić	7^{7}	4	6^{7}
(United States) Rajeev Ram (United Kingdom) Joe Salisbury	6	6
2	(Spain) Marcel Granollers (Argentina) Horacio Zeballos	4	4

Semifinals
1	(Finland) Harri Heliövaara (United Kingdom) Henry Patten	6^{4}	2
5	(United States) Christian Harrison (United Kingdom) Neal Skupski	7^{7}	6
6	(Germany) Kevin Krawietz (Germany) Tim Pütz	6	6
(United States) Rajeev Ram (United Kingdom) Joe Salisbury	3	4

Final
5	(United States) Christian Harrison (United Kingdom) Neal Skupski	6	7^{8}
6	(Germany) Kevin Krawietz (Germany) Tim Pütz	4	6^{6}

=== Top half ===
==== Section 1 ====
First round
1	(Finland) H Heliövaara (United Kingdom) H Patten	6	6
(Argentina) F Cerúndolo (Argentina) JM Cerúndolo	4	2
(Monaco) R Arneodo (France) A Mannarino	0	2
(Italy) M Arnaldi (Germany) J-L Struff	6	6
(Brazil) M Demoliner (Chinese Taipei) R Ho	6	6^{1}	2
WC	(United States) N Lammons (United States) J Withrow	4	7^{7}	6
WC	(United States) D Milavsky (United States) B Shick	2	6	1
16	(Portugal) F Cabral (United States) JJ Tracy	6	3	6
12	(Monaco) H Nys (France) É Roger-Vasselin	7^{7}	7
(Switzerland) J Paul (Czech Republic) M Vocel	6^{4}	5
(Netherlands) S Arends (Netherlands) D Pel	6	6^{7}	6^{10}
(India) S Balaji (United States) E King	3	7^{9}	7^{12}
PR	(Kazakhstan) A Bublik (China) J Shang	6	6
(Argentina) S Báez (Hungary) F Marozsán	2	4
(New Zealand) F Reynolds (New Zealand) J Watt	2	4
7	(Argentina) G Andreozzi (France) M Guinard	6	6

Second round
1	(Finland) H Heliövaara (United Kingdom) H Patten	7	6
(Italy) M Arnaldi (Germany) J-L Struff	5	2
WC	(United States) N Lammons (United States) J Withrow	2	7^{7}	4
16	(Portugal) F Cabral (United States) JJ Tracy	6	6^{3}	6
12	(Monaco) H Nys (France) É Roger-Vasselin	6	7
(India) S Balaji (United States) E King	4	5
PR	(Kazakhstan) A Bublik (China) J Shang
7	(Argentina) G Andreozzi (France) M Guinard	w/o

Third round
1	(Finland) H Heliövaara (United Kingdom) H Patten	6	6
16	(Portugal) F Cabral (United States) JJ Tracy	4	4
12	(Monaco) H Nys (France) É Roger-Vasselin	7^{7}	4	6^{1}
7	(Argentina) G Andreozzi (France) M Guinard	6^{4}	6	7^{10}

Quarterfinals
1	(Finland) H Heliövaara (United Kingdom) H Patten	6^{7}	7^{7}	6
7	(Argentina) G Andreozzi (France) M Guinard	7^{9}	6^{3}	2

==== Section 2 ====
First round
4	(Italy) S Bolelli (Italy) A Vavassori	6	7
(France) Q Halys (France) P-H Herbert	3	5
(Belgium) A Blockx (Croatia) D Prižmić	6^{4}	3
(Belgium) S Gillé (Netherlands) S Verbeek	7^{7}	6
(United States) R Seggerman (United States) P Trhac	7^{7}	7^{7}
(India) Y Bhambri (New Zealand) M Venus	6^{4}	6^{3}
(Poland) F Pieczonka (Netherlands) B Stevens	1	6^{1}
15	(United States) A Krajicek (Croatia) N Mektić	6	7^{7}
11	(France) S Doumbia (France) F Reboul	5	7^{7}	6
(United Kingdom) D Stevenson (United Kingdom) M Willis	7	6^{2}	3
WC	(Puerto Rico) Y Álvarez (United States) N Johnston	3	6^{6}
(Germany) J Schnaitter (Germany) M Wallner	6	7^{8}
WC	(United States) M Damm (United States) M McDonald	6^{5}	4
Alt	(United Kingdom) J Choinski (Bulgaria) A Donski	7^{7}	6
(France) A Reymond (France) L Sanchez	0	6^{3}
5	(United States) C Harrison (United Kingdom) N Skupski	6	7^{7}

Second round
4	(Italy) S Bolelli (Italy) A Vavassori	6	6
(Belgium) S Gillé (Netherlands) S Verbeek	3	4
(United States) R Seggerman (United States) P Trhac	6	3	6^{8}
15	(United States) A Krajicek (Croatia) N Mektić	3	6	7^{10}
11	(France) S Doumbia (France) F Reboul	6^{4}	6	4
(Germany) J Schnaitter (Germany) M Wallner	7^{7}	2	6
Alt	(United Kingdom) J Choinski (Bulgaria) A Donski	6^{1}	3
5	(United States) C Harrison (United Kingdom) N Skupski	7^{7}	6

Third round
4	(Italy) S Bolelli (Italy) A Vavassori	4	7^{7}	7^{10}
15	(United States) A Krajicek (Croatia) N Mektić	6	6^{5}	6^{8}
(Germany) J Schnaitter (Germany) M Wallner	3	6^{1}
5	(United States) C Harrison (United Kingdom) N Skupski	6	7^{7}

Quarterfinals
4	(Italy) S Bolelli (Italy) A Vavassori	3	2
5	(United States) C Harrison (United Kingdom) N Skupski	6	6

=== Bottom half ===
==== Section 3 ====
First round
6	(Germany) K Krawietz (Germany) T Pütz	7^{8}	6^{3}	6
Alt	(Portugal) J Faria (Australia) A Walton	6^{6}	7^{7}	4
(United States) R Galloway (Sweden) A Göransson	6^{4}	6^{4}
(Netherlands) J-J Rojer (United States) T Winegar	7^{7}	7^{7}
PR	(Kazakhstan) A Golubev (Kazakhstan) A Nedovyesov	5	3
(Czech Republic) A Pavlásek (Czech Republic) P Rikl	7	6
(Italy) L Darderi (Argentina) M Kestelboim	3	4
9	(United Kingdom) J Cash (United Kingdom) L Glasspool	6	6
13	(Austria) L Miedler (Australia) M Polmans	7	6
WC	(United States) Bra Nakashima (United States) Bry Nakashima	5	4
(Portugal) N Borges (Australia) R Hijikata	6^{4}	4
(United States) R Cash (Austria) A Erler	7^{7}	6
(United States) J Brooksby (United States) M Giron	6^{6}	5
WC	(United States) M Kiger (United States) A Kovacevic	7^{8}	7
(United Kingdom) L Johnson (Poland) J Zieliński	4	6	6^{1}
3	(El Salvador) M Arévalo (Croatia) M Pavić	6	1	7^{10}

Second round
6	(Germany) K Krawietz (Germany) T Pütz	7^{12}	5	6
(Netherlands) J-J Rojer (United States) T Winegar	6^{10}	7	2
(Czech Republic) A Pavlásek (Czech Republic) P Rikl	6^{2}	4	2
9	(United Kingdom) J Cash (United Kingdom) L Glasspool	7^{7}	6
13	(Austria) L Miedler (Australia) M Polmans	2	6	6
(United States) R Cash (Austria) A Erler	6	3	4
WC	(United States) M Kiger (United States) A Kovacevic	6^{6}	7^{7}	6^{7}
3	(El Salvador) M Arévalo (Croatia) M Pavić	7^{8}	6^{3}	7^{10}

Third round
6	(Germany) K Krawietz (Germany) T Pütz	7^{7}	7^{7}
9	(United Kingdom) J Cash (United Kingdom) L Glasspool	6^{1}	6^{5}
13	(Austria) L Miedler (Australia) M Polmans	6^{3}	6	3
3	(El Salvador) M Arévalo (Croatia) M Pavić	7^{7}	4	6

Quarterfinals
6	(Germany) K Krawietz (Germany) T Pütz	6^{4}	6	7^{10}
3	(El Salvador) M Arévalo (Croatia) M Pavić	7^{7}	4	6^{7}

==== Section 4 ====
First round
8	(Brazil) O Luz (Brazil) R Matos	6	6^{5}	5
WC	(United States) B Carpico (United States) N Filin	4	7^{7}	7
(Australia) J Duckworth (Serbia) M Kecmanović	6	5	4
(Brazil) M Melo (Australia) J Peers	3	7	6
(United States) R Ram (United Kingdom) J Salisbury	7^{7}	7^{8}
(Mexico) S González (Australia) J-P Smith	6^{3}	6^{6}
(France) B Bonzi (France) A Rinderknech	6^{4}	3
10	(France) T Arribagé (France) A Olivetti	7^{7}	6
14	(Germany) C Frantzen (Netherlands) R Haase	6^{4}	7	3
(Argentina) M González (Argentina) A Molteni	7^{7}	5	6
(Czech Republic) P Nouza (Austria) N Oberleitner	7^{7}	6^{4}	6
Alt	(Ecuador) G Escobar (India) N Kaliyanda Poonacha	6^{3}	7^{7}	2
(United Kingdom) A Fery (United Kingdom) J Paris	6	5	6
Alt	(India) A Chandrasekar; I Liutarevich	4	7	4
(Germany) H Jebens (Mexico) MÁ Reyes-Varela	5	3
2	(Spain) M Granollers (Argentina) H Zeballos	7	6

Second round
WC	(United States) B Carpico (United States) N Filin	3	7^{7}	6
(Brazil) M Melo (Australia) J Peers	6	6^{0}	4
(United States) R Ram (United Kingdom) J Salisbury	6^{2}	7^{11}	6
10	(France) T Arribagé (France) A Olivetti	7^{7}	6^{9}	4
(Argentina) M González (Argentina) A Molteni	7^{9}	6
(Czech Republic) P Nouza (Austria) N Oberleitner	6^{7}	3
(United Kingdom) A Fery (United Kingdom) J Paris
2	(Spain) M Granollers (Argentina) H Zeballos	w/o

Third round
WC	(United States) B Carpico (United States) N Filin	6^{6}	6	4
(United States) R Ram (United Kingdom) J Salisbury	7^{8}	4	6
(Argentina) M González (Argentina) A Molteni	3	3
2	(Spain) M Granollers (Argentina) H Zeballos	6	6

Quarterfinals
(United States) R Ram (United Kingdom) J Salisbury	6	6
2	(Spain) M Granollers (Argentina) H Zeballos	4	4

== Seeded teams ==
The following are the seeded teams. Seedings are based on ATP rankings as of August 31, 2026.

Country	Player	Country	Player	Rank	Seed
FIN	Harri Heliövaara	GBR	Henry Patten	2	1
ESP	Marcel Granollers	ARG	Horacio Zeballos	7	2
ESA	Marcelo Arévalo	CRO	Mate Pavić	13	3
ITA	Simone Bolelli	ITA	Andrea Vavassori	17	4
USA	Christian Harrison	GBR	Neal Skupski	17	5
GER	Kevin Krawietz	GER	Tim Pütz	21	6
ARG	Guido Andreozzi	FRA	Manuel Guinard	29	7
BRA	Orlando Luz	BRA	Rafael Matos	29	8
GBR	Julian Cash	GBR	Lloyd Glasspool	34	9
FRA	Théo Arribagé	FRA	Albano Olivetti	39	10
FRA	Sadio Doumbia	FRA	Fabien Reboul	43	11
MON	Hugo Nys	FRA	Édouard Roger-Vasselin	47	12
AUT	Lucas Miedler	AUS	Marc Polmans	53	13
GER	Constantin Frantzen	NED	Robin Haase	59	14
USA	Austin Krajicek	CRO	Nikola Mektić	60	15
POR	Francisco Cabral	USA	JJ Tracy	74	16

== Other entry information ==
=== Wildcards ===
- (Puerto Rico) Yannik Álvarez / (United States) Noah Johnston
- (United States) Brandon Carpico / (United States) Nikita Filin
- (United States) Martin Damm / (United States) Mackenzie McDonald
- (United States) Mac Kiger / (United States) Aleksandar Kovacevic
- (United States) Nathaniel Lammons / (United States) Jackson Withrow
- (United States) Daniel Milavsky / (United States) Braden Shick
- (United States) Brandon Nakashima / (United States) Bryce Nakashima

=== Protected ranking ===
- (Kazakhstan) Alexander Bublik / (China) Shang Juncheng
- (Kazakhstan) Andrey Golubev / (Kazakhstan) Aleksandr Nedovyesov

=== Alternates ===
- (India) Anirudh Chandrasekar / Ivan Liutarevich
- (United Kingdom) Jan Choinski / (Bulgaria) Alexander Donski
- (Ecuador) Gonzalo Escobar / (India) Niki Kaliyanda Poonacha
- (Portugal) Jaime Faria / (Australia) Adam Walton

=== Withdrawals ===
- (France) Térence Atmane / (Brazil) Fernando Romboli → replaced by (Portugal) Jaime Faria / (Australia) Adam Walton
- (Peru) Ignacio Buse / (Argentina) Marco Trungelliti → replaced by (Ecuador) Gonzalo Escobar / (India) Niki Kaliyanda Poonacha
- (Argentina) Tomás Martín Etcheverry / (Argentina) Camilo Ugo Carabelli → replaced by (India) Anirudh Chandrasekar / Ivan Liutarevich
- (Ecuador) Diego Hidalgo / (Chile) Alejandro Tabilo → replaced by (United Kingdom) Jan Choinski / (Bulgaria) Alexander Donski
