= 2026 US Open – Boys' singles =

Tennis championship

Boys' singles
- 2026 US Open

Final
- Champion: (United States) Marcel Latak
- Runner-up: (Brazil) Guto Miguel
- Score: 3–6, 7–5, 7–6^{(15–13)}
- Date: September 12, 2026

Details
- Draw: 64 (8Q / 8WC)
- Seeds: 16

Events
Singles	men	women		boys	girls
Doubles	men	women	mixed	boys	girls
WC Singles	men	women	quad	boys	girls
WC Doubles	men	women	quad	boys	girls
- US Open

Marcel Latak won the boys' singles title at the 2026 US Open, defeating top-seed Guto Miguel in the final, 3–6, 7–5, 7–6^{(15–13)}. He was the first American player to win a boys' singles event at the US Open since Taylor Fritz in 2015.

Ivan Ivanov was the defending champion, but chose not to participate this year.

== Seeds ==
1. (Brazil) Guto Miguel (final)
2. (Germany) Jamie Mackenzie (semifinals)
3. (United States) Michael Antonius (second round)
4. (United States) Keaton Hance (quarterfinals)
5. (United States) Jack Kennedy (quarterfinals)
6. (Slovenia) Žiga Šeško (first round)
7. (Austria) Thilo Behrmann (semifinals)
8. (United States) Jordan Lee (quarterfinals)
9. (France) Yannick Theodor Alexandrescou (second round)
10. (Bulgaria) Dimitar Kisimov (third round)
11. (Germany) Vincent Reisach (first round)
12. (United States) Andrew Johnson (third round)
13. (Puerto Rico) Yannik Álvarez (second round)
14. (France) Mathys Domenc (second round)
15. (Chinese Taipei) Chen Kuan-shou (first round)
16. (Peru) Nicolás Baena (first round)

Click on the seed number of a player to go to their draw section.

== Draw ==
Key

- Q = Qualifier
- WC = Wild card
- LL = Lucky loser
- Alt = Alternate
- ITF = ITF entry
- PR = Protected ranking
- SR = Special ranking
- SE = Special exempt
- JE = Junior exempt
- JR = Junior Accelerator Programme entrant
- CO = College Accelerator Programme entrant
- NG = Next Gen Accelerator Program entrant
- w/o = Walkover
- r = Retired
- d = Defaulted

=== Finals ===
Quarterfinals
1	(Brazil) Guto Miguel	4	6	7^{13}
8	(United States) Jordan Lee	6	3	6^{11}
(Italy) Simone Massellani	6	2	3
7	(Austria) Thilo Behrmann	3	6	6
SE	(United States) Marcel Latak	6	6
4	(United States) Keaton Hance	4	4
5	(United States) Jack Kennedy	6	3	2
2	(Germany) Jamie Mackenzie	4	6	6

Semifinals
1	(Brazil) Guto Miguel	6	6
7	(Austria) Thilo Behrmann	4	4
SE	(United States) Marcel Latak	6	7^{7}
2	(Germany) Jamie Mackenzie	3	6^{2}

Final
1	(Brazil) Guto Miguel	6	5	6^{13}
SE	(United States) Marcel Latak	3	7	7^{15}

=== Top half ===
==== Section 1 ====
First round
1	(Brazil) Guto Miguel	3	6	7^{10}
Q	(United States) Daniel Malacek	6	3	6^{4}
(United Kingdom) Mark Ceban	6	6
Q	(Japan) Yoshihiro Sakurai	4	3
WC	(United States) Navneet Raghuram	6^{1}	6	4
(Hong Kong) Kai Thompson	7^{7}	1	6
(Argentina) Dante Pagani	6	6
16	(Peru) Nicolás Baena	4	3
11	(Germany) Vincent Reisach	5	6	3
(United States) Vihaan Reddy	7	2	6
(France) Daniel Jade	2	6	2
WC	(United States) Mason Vaughan	6	3	0^{r}
(Colombia) Juan Miguel Bolívar Idárraga	3	6	2
(Spain) Valentín González-Galiño	6	3	6
(Italy) Raffaele Ciurnelli	2	2
8	(United States) Jordan Lee	6	6

Second round
1	(Brazil) G Miguel	6	6
(United Kingdom) M Ceban	4	4
(Hong Kong) K Thompson	6^{4}	6	7
(Argentina) D Pagani	7^{7}	2	5
(United States) V Reddy	6^{2}	6^{1}
(France) D Jade	7^{7}	7^{7}
(Spain) V González-Galiño	1	3
8	(United States) J Lee	6	6

Third round
1	(Brazil) G Miguel	6	6
(Hong Kong) K Thompson	2	4
(France) D Jade	3	4
8	(United States) J Lee	6	6

Quarterfinals
1	(Brazil) G Miguel	4	6	7^{13}
8	(United States) J Lee	6	3	6^{11}

==== Section 2 ====
First round
3	(United States) Michael Antonius	6	6
(Brazil) Leonardo Storck França	4	1
Q	(Botswana) Ntungamili Raguin	1	6	2
(Italy) Simone Massellani	6	1	6
(United States) Tanishk Konduri	6	6
(Czech Republic) Jakub Kusý	4	3
Q	(Japan) Koki Nara	4	4
14	(France) Mathys Domenc	6	6
12	(United States) Andrew Johnson	6	6
(India) Arnav Vijay Paparkar	4	1
(Australia) Daniel Jovanovski	6	3	1
(Israel) Dan Brand	1	6	6
WC	(United States) Kayden Colombo	4	3
Q	(Romania) Matei Victor Chelemen	6	6
(United States) Ryan Cozad	6^{5}	1
7	(Austria) Thilo Behrmann	7^{7}	6

Second round
3	(United States) M Antonius	3	3
(Italy) S Massellani	6	6
(United States) T Konduri	6	6
14	(France) M Domenc	3	4
12	(United States) A Johnson	6	3	6
(Israel) D Brand	2	6	0
Q	(Romania) MV Chelemen	4	4
7	(Austria) T Behrmann	6	6

Third round
(Italy) S Massellani	7^{7}	6
(United States) T Konduri	6^{1}	2
12	(United States) A Johnson	6	6^{2}	2
7	(Austria) T Behrmann	4	7^{7}	6

Quarterfinals
(Italy) S Massellani	6	2	3
7	(Austria) T Behrmann	3	6	6

=== Bottom half ===
==== Section 3 ====
First round
6	(Slovenia) Žiga Šeško	5	3
SE	(United States) Marcel Latak	7	6
(United States) Gavin Goode	6	6^{1}	6^{8}
(Spain) Tito Chávez	4	7^{7}	7^{10}
(Ecuador) Emilio Camacho	6	7^{10}
(Italy) Matteo Gribaldo	4	6^{8}
WC	(United States) Safir Azam	7^{7}	4	2
10	(Bulgaria) Dimitar Kisimov	6^{4}	6	6
13	(Puerto Rico) Yannik Álvarez	6	6
(Japan) Hyu Kawanishi	4	4
Kirill Filaretov	6	6
WC	(United States) Kamil Stolarczyk	4	4
(Germany) Oliver Majdanzic	6	7^{8}
SE	(United Kingdom) Rhys Lawlor	4	6^{6}
(Brazil) Pedro Henrique Chabalgoity	0	6^{4}
4	(United States) Keaton Hance	6	7^{7}

Second round
SE	(United States) M Latak	7^{9}	6
(Spain) T Chávez	6^{7}	4
(Ecuador) E Camacho	2	6	5
10	(Bulgaria) D Kisimov	6	4	7
13	(Puerto Rico) Y Álvarez	1	4
K Filaretov	6	6
(Germany) O Majdanzic	5	0
4	(United States) K Hance	7	6

Third round
SE	(United States) M Latak	6	6
10	(Bulgaria) D Kisimov	3	3
K Filaretov	6	3	2
4	(United States) K Hance	1	6	6

Quarterfinals
SE	(United States) M Latak	6	6
4	(United States) K Hance	4	4

==== Section 4 ====
First round
5	(United States) Jack Kennedy	6	6
(Japan) Ryo Tabata	3	3
Q	(Brazil) Francisco Fontes D'Amorim	6	3	2
Q	(Canada) Benjamin Azar	2	6	6
(United States) Jack Secord	6	6
(Kazakhstan) Damir Zhalgasbay	3	4
(Italy) Filippo Alfano	0	3
9	(France) Yannick Theodor Alexandrescou	6	6
15	(Chinese Taipei) Chen Kuan-shou	7	3	5
Q	(Nigeria) Oluwaseun Peter Ogunsakin	5	6	7
(South Africa) Connor Doig	7^{7}	6
WC	(United States) Teodor Davidov	6^{4}	3
(Japan) Kanta Watanabe	6	6
WC	(United States) Jerrid Gaines Jr.	3	3
WC	(United States) Matias Reyniak	6^{2}	7^{9}	3
2	(Germany) Jamie Mackenzie	7^{7}	6^{7}	6

Second round
5	(United States) J Kennedy	6	6
Q	(Canada) B Azar	0	4
(United States) J Secord	6	6
9	(France) YT Alexandrescou	2	4
Q	(Nigeria) OP Ogunsakin	3	6	3
(South Africa) C Doig	6	4	6
(Japan) K Watanabe	2	4
2	(Germany) J Mackenzie	6	6

Third round
5	(United States) J Kennedy	6	6
(United States) J Secord	0	4
(South Africa) C Doig	3	3
2	(Germany) J Mackenzie	6	6

Quarterfinals
5	(United States) J Kennedy	6	3	2
2	(Germany) J Mackenzie	4	6	6

== Qualifying ==
=== Seeds ===
1. (Canada) Félix Roussel (qualifying competition)
2. (Botswana) Ntungamili Raguin (qualified)
3. (Canada) Benjamin Azar (qualified)
4. (Thailand) Kunanan Pantaratorn (first round)
5. (Spain) Eudald González (first round)
6. (Romania) Matei Victor Chelemen (qualified)
7. (Latvia) Rihards Neimanis (qualifying competition)
8. (Spain) Max Villar (first round)
9. (Nigeria) Oluwaseun Peter Ogunsakin (qualified)
10. (South Africa) John Bothma (first round)
11. (Canada) Joshua Adamson (qualifying competition)
12. (France) Aaron Gabet (qualifying competition)
13. (Canada) Xavier Massotte (first round)
14. (Germany) Christopher Thies (first round)
15. (Poland) Aleksander Błuś (first round)
16. (Japan) Koki Nara (qualified)

=== Qualifiers ===
1. (Nigeria) Oluwaseun Peter Ogunsakin
2. (Botswana) Ntungamili Raguin
3. (Canada) Benjamin Azar
4. (Japan) Yoshihiro Sakurai
5. (United States) Daniel Malacek
6. (Romania) Matei Victor Chelemen
7. (Japan) Koki Nara
8. (Brazil) Francisco Fontes D’Amorim

=== Draw ===
==== First qualifier ====
First round
1	(Canada) Félix Roussel	6	6
WC	(United States) Tomas Laukys	3	2
(Poland) Tymon Litwic	3	0
9	(Nigeria) Oluwaseun Peter Ogunsakin	6	6

Qualifying competition
1	(Canada) Félix Roussel	3	4
9	(Nigeria) Oluwaseun Peter Ogunsakin	6	6

==== Second qualifier ====
First round
2	(Botswana) Ntungamili Raguin	6	6
(Germany) Eric Dylan Müller	3	4
WC	(United States) Izyan Ahmad	1	6	[10]
13	(Canada) Xavier Massotte	6	4	[7]

Qualifying competition
2	(Botswana) Ntungamili Raguin	7	7^{11}
WC	(United States) Izyan Ahmad	5	6^{9}

==== Third qualifier ====
First round
3	(Canada) Benjamin Azar	6	3	[12]
(Brazil) Livas Eduardo De Carvalho Damazio	1	6	[10]
(Uruguay) Felipe Vázquez	0	6	[10]
15	(Poland) Aleksander Błuś	6	4	[3]

Qualifying competition
3	(Canada) Benjamin Azar	6	3	[10]
(Uruguay) Felipe Vázquez	1	6	[1]

==== Fourth qualifier ====
First round
4	(Thailand) Kunanan Pantaratorn	2	1
WC	(Japan) Yoshihiro Sakurai	6	6
(Peru) Alessandro Rubini Garcia Belaunde	7	6
10	(South Africa) John Bothma	5	2

Qualifying competition
WC	(Japan) Yoshihiro Sakurai	6	6
(Peru) Alessandro Rubini Garcia Belaunde	1	3

==== Fifth qualifier ====
First round
5	(Spain) Eudald González	6	2	[6]
WC	(United States) Daniel Malacek	3	6	[10]
(Japan) Eito Komada	1	6	[1]
11	(Canada) Joshua Adamson	6	1	[10]

Qualifying competition
WC	(United States) Daniel Malacek	6	6
11	(Canada) Joshua Adamson	2	3

==== Sixth qualifier ====
First round
6	(Romania) Matei Victor Chelemen	6	6
WC	(United States) Zen David Uehling	0	3
(Japan) Takahiro Kawaguchi	4	3
12	(France) Aaron Gabet	6	6

Qualifying competition
6	(Romania) Matei Victor Chelemen	4	7	[10]
12	(France) Aaron Gabet	6	5	[5]

==== Seventh qualifier ====
First round
7	(Latvia) Rihards Neimanis	6	6
(Paraguay) Álvaro Ariel Frutos Alonso	2	2
(United States) Agassi Rusher	1	6	[2]
16	(Japan) Koki Nara	6	1	[10]

Qualifying competition
7	(Latvia) Rihards Neimanis	5	3
16	(Japan) Koki Nara	7	6

==== Eighth qualifier ====
First round
8	(Spain) Max Villar	6^{5}	6	[5]
(Brazil) Francisco Fontes D’Amorim	7^{7}	2	[10]
WC	(United States) Tyler Lee	6	6
14	(Germany) Christopher Thies	0	4

Qualifying competition
(Brazil) Francisco Fontes D’Amorim	7^{7}	0	[10]
WC	(United States) Tyler Lee	6^{5}	6	[7]

== Other entry information ==
=== Wildcards ===
- (United States) Safir Azam
- (United States) Kayden Colombo
- (United States) Teodor Davidov
- (United States) Jerrod Gaines Jr.
- (United States) Navneet Raghuram
- (United States) Matias Reyniak
- (United States) Kamil Stolarczyk
- (United States) Mason Vaughan
