= 2026 US Open – Wheelchair quad doubles =

Tennis championship

Wheelchair quad doubles
- 2026 US Open

Final
- Champions: (Netherlands) Sam Schröder (Australia) Jin Woodman
- Runners-up: (Israel) Guy Sasson (Netherlands) Niels Vink
- Score: 6–3, 2–6, [10–7]
- Date: September 11, 2026

Details
- Draw: 8
- Seeds: 2

Events
Singles	men	women		boys	girls
Doubles	men	women	mixed	boys	girls
WC Singles	men	women	quad	boys	girls
WC Doubles	men	women	quad	boys	girls
- US Open

Sam Schröder and Jin Woodman defeated defending champions Guy Sasson and Niels Vink in the final, 6–2, 3–6, [10–7] to win the quad doubles wheelchair tennis title at the 2026 US Open. Vink (who was individually a four-time defending champion) and Sasson were attempting to complete the Grand Slam, and the defeat ended their streak of major doubles titles at six.

== Seeds ==
1. (Israel) Guy Sasson / (Netherlands) Niels Vink (final)
2. (Netherlands) Sam Schröder / (Australia) Jin Woodman (champions)

== Draw ==
Key

- Q = Qualifier
- WC = Wild card
- LL = Lucky loser
- Alt = Alternate
- ITF = ITF entry
- PR = Protected ranking
- SR = Special ranking
- SE = Special exempt
- JE = Junior exempt
- JR = Junior Accelerator Programme entrant
- CO = College Accelerator Programme entrant
- NG = Next Gen Accelerator Program entrant
- w/o = Walkover
- r = Retired
- d = Defaulted

=== Finals ===
Quarterfinals
1	(Israel) Guy Sasson (Netherlands) Niels Vink	6	6
(Australia) Heath Davidson (United Kingdom) Gregory Slade	0	0
(Chile) Francisco Cayulef (Argentina) Gonzalo Enrique Lazarte	6	6
(Turkey) Ahmet Kaplan (Australia) Benjamin Wenzel	3	1
(United States) Andrew Bogdanov (United States) David Wagner	6^{5}	1
(South Africa) Leon Els (United Kingdom) Andy Lapthorne	7^{7}	6
(Brazil) Leandro Pena (Brazil) Ymanitu Silva	3	4
2	(Netherlands) Sam Schröder (Australia) Jin Woodman	6	6

Semifinals
1	(Israel) Guy Sasson (Netherlands) Niels Vink	6	6
(Chile) Francisco Cayulef (Argentina) Gonzalo Enrique Lazarte	0	1
(South Africa) Leon Els (United Kingdom) Andy Lapthorne	6	3	[8]
2	(Netherlands) Sam Schröder (Australia) Jin Woodman	4	6	[10]

Final
1	(Israel) Guy Sasson (Netherlands) Niels Vink	3	6	[7]
2	(Netherlands) Sam Schröder (Australia) Jin Woodman	6	2	[10]
