= Matthew Knoesen =

British wheelchair tennis player

Personal information
- Website: https://matthewknoesen.com/

Sport
- Sport: Wheelchair tennis

Matthew Knoesen (born 2012) is a British wheelchair tennis player. He is ranked world number 3 in the ITF Junior wheelchair tennis rankings and is the youngest player in history to win a junior wheelchair tennis Grand Slam singles and doubles title at the same tournament. In 2026, he became the youngest ambassador in the history of Richard Mille.

== Early life ==
Knoesen was born in the United Kingdom to South African parents. In his early years the family lived near the All England Lawn Tennis Club in Southfields, London, where they were frequent visitors to Chelsea and Westminster Hospital as his diagnosis and prognosis were established. The family subsequently relocated to Kent, where Knoesen grew up.

He was born with severe Arthrogryposis affecting his upper left side and both lower limbs.

From an early age, Knoesen demonstrated a passion for motorsport. He began karting competitively and by the age of eight had earned a British Racing Licence - as covered by Motorsport UK in its April issue of that year. His technical aptitude attracted the attention of engineers from Red Bull Racing and the Alpine F1 team, who worked with him on optimising his kart setup.

Following major surgery, Knoesen was unable to continue racing. Inspired by British racing driver Billy Monger, who returned to motorsport following a serious accident, Knoesen redirected his competitive focus toward wheelchair tennis.

== Tennis career ==
Knoesen trains at Horsmonden Tennis Club and Tunbridge Wells Sports Centre and is part of the LTA National Age Group Performance Programme. Matthew trains under the guidance and mentorship of LTA Level 5 Performance Coach Zane Cheeseman.

=== 2025 ===
In 2025, Knoesen represented Great Britain at the ITF Junior World Team Cup in Antalya, Türkiye, helping the squad to gold.

He became the youngest entrant in the inaugural integration of the wheelchair tennis junior draw into the Orange Bowl in Florida in November 2025, reaching the semi-finals at the age of 12.

At the LTA end of year national championships in 2025, Knoesen held both the British Junior and Senior titles simultaneously, the first player in the history of British wheelchair tennis to do so.

=== 2026 ===
At the 2026 Australian Open, Knoesen reached the junior singles and doubles finals on his Grand Slam debut, becoming the youngest British player in history to reach a Grand Slam junior wheelchair tennis final. He lost the singles final to world number two Alex Lantermann, four years his senior.

In May 2026, Knoesen was part of the Great Britain junior squad that claimed the inaugural Boys' title at the ITF Junior World Team Cup in Knokke-Heist, Belgium, completing the event without dropping a set.

At the 2026 Roland Garros tournament, Knoesen won both the junior singles and doubles titles on his Roland Garros debut, becoming the youngest player in history to win a junior wheelchair tennis Grand Slam singles title and the youngest player to win both the singles and doubles titles at the same junior wheelchair tennis Grand Slam tournament.

Playing his third Play Your Way to Wimbledon tournament, Knoesen won the August 2026 men's wheelchair competition.

=== Commercial partners ===
Knoesen's commercial partners include Richard Mille, Vodafone UK, Under Armour, Hawes & Curtis and Baylis & Harding.

In June 2026, Richard Mille announced a multi-year partnership with Knoesen at Roland Garros, making him the youngest ambassador in the brand's history. In their announcement, Richard Mille placed Knoesen in the same lineage as Charles Leclerc and Lilou Wadoux.

=== Equipment partners ===
Knoesen's equipment partners include Yonex (racket and shoe), Rudy Project (eyewear), Sennheiser (audio), Google Pixel (device), Garmin (wearable), TEMPUR (sleep), VITAL+(cold therapy), PongBot (AI training aids)

== Personal life ==
Knoesen raced where possible with the number 27, and wears the number 27 on his tennis chair - a reference to his birthday, Ayrton Senna's racing number, and a number that would come to hold particular resonance when Knoesen later became an ambassador of Richard Mille, the Swiss watch house whose timepiece (RM 27) was worn by his tennis role model Rafael Nadal. His personal mantra is "Train hard, fight easy."

== Sources ==
- "What's been happening in June 2026". International Paralympic Committee. 3 July 2026.
- "Wheelchair tennis players Ruben Harris, from Canterbury, Beckenham's Lucas de Gouveia and Staplehurst's Matthew Knoesen help Great Britain to junior title at BNP Paribas World Team Cup in Turkey". Kent Online. 26 May 2025.
- Kershaw, Tom (23 May 2026). "Meet F1-mad kid, 13, who's on turbo-charged rise in wheelchair tennis". The Times.
- Nobbs, Eleanor (12 August 2026). "Cranbrook's Matthew Knoesen wins wheelchair title at Wimbledon". Ealing Times.
