= 2023 Wimbledon Championships – Day-by-day summaries =

The 2023 Wimbledon Championships's order of play for main draw matches on the center court and outside courts, starting from July 3 until July 16.

All dates are BST (UTC+1).

== Day 1 (3 July) ==
- Seeds out:
  - Gentlemen's Singles: (Canada) Félix Auger-Aliassime [11], (Japan) Yoshihito Nishioka [24]
  - Ladies' Singles: (United States) Coco Gauff [7], Liudmila Samsonova [15], (China) Zheng Qinwen [24], (Egypt) Mayar Sherif [31]
- Schedule of play

Matches on main courts
Matches on Centre Court
Event	Winner	Loser	Score
Gentlemen's Singles 1st Round	(Serbia) Novak Djokovic [2]	(Argentina) Pedro Cachin	6–3, 6–3, 7–6^{(7–4)}
Ladies' Singles 1st Round	(Ukraine) Elina Svitolina [WC]	(United States) Venus Williams [WC]	6–4, 6–3
Gentlemen's Singles 1st Round	(Italy) Jannik Sinner [8]	(Argentina) Juan Manuel Cerúndolo	6–2, 6–2, 6–2
Matches on No. 1 Court
Event	Winner	Loser	Score
Ladies' Singles 1st Round	(Poland) Iga Świątek [1]	(China) Zhu Lin	6–1, 6–3
Gentlemen's Singles 1st Round	(Norway) Casper Ruud [4]	(France) Laurent Lokoli [Q]	6–1, 5–7, 6–4, 6–3
Ladies' Singles 1st Round	(United States) Sofia Kenin [Q]	(United States) Coco Gauff [7]	6–4, 4–6, 6–2
Matches on No. 2 Court
Event	Winner	Loser	Score
Ladies' Singles 1st Round	(United States) Jessica Pegula [4]	(United States) Lauren Davis	6–2, 6–7^{(8–10)}, 6–3
Gentlemen's Singles 1st Round	(Belgium) David Goffin [WC]	(Hungary) Fábián Marozsán [LL]	6–2, 5–7, 6–2, 6–0
Ladies' Singles 1st Round	(Switzerland) Belinda Bencic [14]	(United Kingdom) Katie Swan [WC]	7–5, 6–2
Gentlemen's Singles 1st Round	(France) Quentin Halys vs (United Kingdom) Dan Evans [27]		6–2, 6–3, 0–0, suspended
Matches on No. 3 Court
Event	Winner	Loser	Score
Gentlemen's Singles 1st Round	Andrey Rublev [7]	(Australia) Max Purcell	6–3, 7–5, 6–4
Ladies' Singles 1st Round	(France) Caroline Garcia [5]	(United States) Katie Volynets	6–4, 6–3
Ladies' Singles 1st Round	(United Kingdom) Jodie Burrage [WC]	(United States) Caty McNally	6–1, 6–3
Gentlemen's Singles 1st Round	(Germany) Yannick Hanfmann vs (United States) Taylor Fritz [9]		4–6, 6–2, 6–4, 5–7, 2–3, suspended
Matches began at 11 am (1:30 pm on Centre Court and 1:00 pm on No. 1 Court) BST

== Day 2 (4 July) ==
- Seeds out:
  - Gentlemen's Singles: (United Kingdom) Dan Evans [27]
- Schedule of play

Matches on main courts
Matches on Centre Court
Event	Winner	Loser	Score
Ladies' Singles 1st Round	(Kazakhstan) Elena Rybakina [3]	(United States) Shelby Rogers	4–6, 6–1, 6–2
Gentlemen's Singles 1st Round	(United Kingdom) Andy Murray	(United Kingdom) Ryan Peniston [WC]	6–3, 6–0, 6–1
Ladies' Singles 1st Round	Aryna Sabalenka [2]	(Hungary) Panna Udvardy	6–3, 6–1
Gentlemen's Singles 1st Round (Note: This match was originally scheduled to play on No. 2 Court but was moved to Centre Court after the conclusion of the Udvardy-Sabalenka match due to rain interruptions.)	(France) Quentin Halys	(United Kingdom) Dan Evans [27]	6–2, 6–3, 6–7^{(5–7)}, 6–4
Matches on No. 1 Court
Event	Winner	Loser	Score
Gentlemen's Singles 1st Round	(Spain) Carlos Alcaraz [1]	(France) Jérémy Chardy [PR]	6–0, 6–2, 7–5
Ladies' Singles 1st Round	(Tunisia) Ons Jabeur [6]	(Poland) Magdalena Fręch	6–3, 6–3
Gentlemen's Singles 1st Round	(United Kingdom) Cameron Norrie [12]	(Czech Republic) Tomáš Macháč [Q]	6–3, 4–6, 6–1, 6–4
Gentlemen's Singles 1st Round (Note: This match was originally scheduled to play on Court 11 but was moved to No. 1 Court after the conclusion of the Norrie-Macháč match due to rain interruptions.)	(Argentina) Tomás Martín Etcheverry [29]	(Spain) Bernabé Zapata Miralles	6–7^{(5–7)}, 5–7, 6–3, 6–4, 7–5
Matches on No. 2 Court
Event	Winner	Loser	Score
Gentlemen's Singles 1st Round	(Austria) Dominic Thiem vs (Greece) Stefanos Tsitsipas [5]		6–3, 3–4, suspended
Ladies' Singles 1st Round	(Italy) Jasmine Paolini vs (Czech Republic) Petra Kvitová [9]		cancelled
Ladies' Singles 1st Round	(United Kingdom) Heather Watson [WC] vs (Czech Republic) Barbora Krejčíková [10]		cancelled
Gentlemen's Singles 1st Round	Daniil Medvedev [3] vs (United Kingdom) Arthur Fery [WC]		cancelled
Matches on No. 3 Court
Event	Winner	Loser	Score
Gentlemen's Singles 1st Round	(United Kingdom) George Loffhagen [WC] vs (Denmark) Holger Rune [6]		6–7^{(4–7)}, 0–0 suspended
Gentlemen's Singles 1st Round	(Germany) Yannick Hanfmann vs (United States) Taylor Fritz [9]		4–6, 6–2, 6–4, 5–7, 2–3, cancelled
Ladies' Singles 1st Round	(Greece) Maria Sakkari [8] vs (Ukraine) Marta Kostyuk		cancelled
Gentlemen's Singles 1st Round	(Germany) Alexander Zverev [19] vs (Netherlands) Gijs Brouwer [Q]		cancelled
Ladies' Singles 1st Round	(United Kingdom) Sonay Kartal [WC] vs (United States) Madison Keys [25]		cancelled
Matches began at 11 am (1:30 pm on Centre Court and 1:00 pm on No. 1 Court) BST

== Day 3 (5 July) ==
- Seeds out:
  - Gentlemen's Singles: (Croatia) Borna Ćorić [13], (Spain) Roberto Bautista Agut [20], (United States) Sebastian Korda [22], (Netherlands) Tallon Griekspoor [28]
  - Ladies' Singles: (Greece) Maria Sakkari [8], (Czech Republic) Karolína Plíšková [18], (United States) Bernarda Pera [27]
- Schedule of play

Matches on main courts
Matches on Centre Court
Event	Winner	Loser	Score
Ladies' Singles 2nd Round	Daria Kasatkina [11]	(United Kingdom) Jodie Burrage [WC]	6–0, 6–2
Ladies' Singles 2nd Round	(Poland) Iga Świątek [1]	(Spain) Sara Sorribes Tormo [PR]	6–2, 6–0
Gentlemen's Singles 2nd Round	(Serbia) Novak Djokovic [2]	(Australia) Jordan Thompson	6–3, 7–6^{(7–4)}, 7–5
Ladies' Singles 1st Round (Note: This match was originally scheduled to play on No. 2 Court but was moved to Centre Court after the conclusion of the Thompson-Djokovic match due to rain interruptions.)	(Czech Republic) Petra Kvitová [9]	(Italy) Jasmine Paolini	6–4, 6–7^{(5–7)}, 6–1
Matches on No. 1 Court
Event	Winner	Loser	Score
Gentlemen's Singles 1st Round	Daniil Medvedev [3]	(United Kingdom) Arthur Fery [WC]	7–5, 6–4, 6–3
Ladies' Singles 1st Round	(Czech Republic) Barbora Krejčíková [10]	(United Kingdom) Heather Watson [WC]	6–2, 7–5
Gentlemen's Singles 2nd Round	(Italy) Jannik Sinner [8]	(Argentina) Diego Schwartzman	7–5, 6–1, 6–2
Gentlemen's Singles 1st Round (Note: This match started on Court 8 but after the second set, it was moved to No. 1 Court (after the conclusion of the Sinner-Schwartzman match) due to nightfall.)	(Serbia) Laslo Djere	(United States) Maxime Cressy	6–7^{(5–7)}, 7–6^{(7–3)}, 7–6^{(10–8)}, 7–6^{(9–7)}
Matches on No. 2 Court
Event	Winner	Loser	Score
Ladies' Singles 1st Round	(Ukraine) Marta Kostyuk	(Greece) Maria Sakkari [8]	0–6, 7–5, 6–2
Gentlemen's Singles 1st Round	(United States) Taylor Fritz [9]	(Germany) Yannick Hanfmann	6–4, 2–6, 4–6, 7–5, 6–3
Gentlemen's Singles 1st Round	(Greece) Stefanos Tsitsipas [5]	(Austria) Dominic Thiem	3–6, 7–6^{(7–1)}, 6–2, 6–7^{(5–7)}, 7–6^{(10–8)}
Gentlemen's Singles 1st Round (Note: This match was originally scheduled to play on Court 5 but was moved to No. 2 Court after the conclusion of the Thiem-Tsitsipas match due to rain interruptions.)	(Italy) Marco Cecchinato vs (Chile) Nicolás Jarry [25]		6–4, 1–4, suspended
Gentlemen's Singles 1st Round	(Germany) Alexander Zverev [19] vs (Netherlands) Gijs Brouwer [Q]		cancelled
Ladies' Singles 2nd Round	(Argentina) Nadia Podoroska vs Victoria Azarenka [19]		cancelled
Matches on No. 3 Court
Event	Winner	Loser	Score
Gentlemen's Singles 1st Round	(United States) Frances Tiafoe [10]	(China) Wu Yibing	7–6^{(7–4)}, 6–3, 6–4
Gentlemen's Singles 1st Round	(Denmark) Holger Rune [6]	(United Kingdom) George Loffhagen [WC]	7–6^{(7–6)}, 6–3, 6–2
Ladies' Singles 1st Round	(United States) Madison Keys [25]	(United Kingdom) Sonay Kartal [WC]	6–0, 6–3
Ladies' Singles 1st Round (Note: This match was originally scheduled to play on Court 9 but was moved to No. 3 Court after the conclusion of the Kartal-Keys match due to rain interruptions.)	(Switzerland) Viktorija Golubic [Q] vs (Slovakia) Anna Karolína Schmiedlová		6–3, 0–0 suspended
Gentlemen's Singles 2nd Round	Andrey Rublev [7] vs Aslan Karatsev		cancelled
Matches began at 11 am (1:30 pm on Centre Court and 1:00 pm on No. 1 Court) BST

== Day 4 (6 July) ==
- Seeds out:
  - Gentlemen's Singles: (Norway) Casper Ruud [4], (United States) Taylor Fritz [9], (Argentina) Francisco Cerúndolo [18], (Argentina) Tomás Martín Etcheverry [29], (United States) Ben Shelton [32]
  - Ladies' Singles: (Czech Republic) Barbora Krejčíková [10], Veronika Kudermetova [12], (Czech Republic) Karolína Muchová [16], (Latvia) Jeļena Ostapenko [17], (Belgium) Elise Mertens [28]
  - Ladies' Doubles: (United States) Nicole Melichar-Martinez / (Australia) Ellen Perez [4], (Japan) Shuko Aoyama / (Japan) Ena Shibahara [8], (China) Xu Yifan / (Kazakhstan) Anna Danilina [11]
- Schedule of play

Matches on main courts
Matches on Centre Court
Event	Winner	Loser	Score
Gentlemen's Singles 2nd Round	(United Kingdom) Liam Broady [WC]	(Norway) Casper Ruud [4]	6–4, 3–6, 4–6, 6–3, 6–0
Ladies' Singles 2nd Round	(Kazakhstan) Elena Rybakina [3]	(France) Alizé Cornet	6–2, 7–6^{(7–2)}
Gentlemen's Singles 2nd Round	(United Kingdom) Andy Murray vs (Greece) Stefanos Tsitsipas [5]		6–7^{(3–7)}, 7–6^{(7–2)}, 6–4, 0–0 suspended
Matches on No. 1 Court
Event	Winner	Loser	Score
Gentlemen's Singles 1st Round	(Germany) Alexander Zverev [19]	(Netherlands) Gijs Brouwer [Q]	6–4, 7–6^{(7–4)}, 7–6^{(7–5)}
Ladies' Singles 2nd Round	(Croatia) Donna Vekić [20]	(United States) Sloane Stephens	4–6, 7–5, 6–4
Ladies' Singles 2nd Round	(United States) Jessica Pegula [4]	(Spain) Cristina Bucșa	6–1, 6–4
Matches on No. 2 Court
Event	Winner	Loser	Score
Ladies' Singles 2nd Round	(Ukraine) Elina Svitolina [WC]	(Belgium) Elise Mertens [28]	6–1, 1–6, 6–1
Gentlemen's Singles 2nd Round	Andrey Rublev [7]	Aslan Karatsev	6–7^{(4–7)}, 6–3, 6–4, 7–5
Ladies' Singles 2nd Round	(Switzerland) Belinda Bencic [14]	(United States) Danielle Collins	3–6, 6–4, 7–6^{(10–2)}
Gentlemen's Singles 2nd Round	Daniil Medvedev [3] vs (France) Adrian Mannarino		6–3, 6–3, 4–4 suspended
Matches on No. 3 Court
Event	Winner	Loser	Score
Gentlemen's Singles 2nd Round	(Switzerland) Stan Wawrinka	(Argentina) Tomás Martín Etcheverry [29]	6–3, 4–6, 6–4, 6–2
Ladies' Singles 1st Round	(Switzerland) Viktorija Golubic [Q]	(Slovakia) Anna Karolína Schmiedlová	6–3, 7–6^{(7–4)}
Ladies' Singles 2nd Round	(France) Caroline Garcia [5]	(Canada) Leylah Fernandez	3–6, 6–4, 7–6^{(10–6)}
Gentlemen's Singles 2nd Round	(Bulgaria) Grigor Dimitrov [21]	Ilya Ivashka	6–3, 6–4, 6–4
Matches began at 11 am (1:30 pm on Centre Court and 1:00 pm on No. 1 Court) BST

== Day 5 (7 July) ==
- Seeds out:
  - Gentlemen's Singles: (United Kingdom) Cameron Norrie [12], (Italy) Lorenzo Musetti [14], (Australia) Alex de Minaur [15]
  - Ladies' Singles: (France) Caroline Garcia [5], Daria Kasatkina [11], (Croatia) Donna Vekić [20], (Poland) Magda Linette [23], (Ukraine) Anhelina Kalinina [26], (Romania) Irina-Camelia Begu [29], (Croatia) Petra Martić [30]
  - Gentlemen's Doubles: (United States) Rajeev Ram / (United Kingdom) Joe Salisbury [3]
  - Ladies' Doubles: (Ukraine) Lyudmyla Kichenok / (Latvia) Jeļena Ostapenko [7], (United States) Asia Muhammad / (Mexico) Giuliana Olmos [10]
  - Mixed Doubles: (United Kingdom) Neal Skupski / (United States) Desirae Krawczyk [2]
- Schedule of play

Matches on main courts
Matches on Centre Court
Event	Winner	Loser	Score
Gentlemen's Singles 2nd Round	(Spain) Carlos Alcaraz [1]	(France) Alexandre Müller	6–4, 7–6^{(7–3)}, 6–3
Gentlemen's Singles 2nd Round	(Greece) Stefanos Tsitsipas [5]	(United Kingdom) Andy Murray	7–6^{(7–3)}, 6–7^{(2–7)}, 4–6, 7–6^{(7–3)}, 6–4
Ladies' Singles 3rd Round	(Poland) Iga Swiatek [1]	(Croatia) Petra Martić [30]	6–2, 7–5
Gentlemen's Singles 3rd Round	(Serbia) Novak Djokovic [2]	(Switzerland) Stan Wawrinka	6–3, 6–1, 7–6^{(7–5)}
Matches on No. 1 Court
Event	Winner	Loser	Score
Ladies' Singles 2nd Round	Aryna Sabalenka [2]	(France) Varvara Gracheva	2–6, 7–5, 6–2
Gentlemen's Singles 2nd Round	(United States) Chris Eubanks	(United Kingdom) Cameron Norrie [12]	6–3, 3–6, 6–2, 7–6^{(7–3)}
Ladies' Singles 2nd Round	(Tunisia) Ons Jabeur [6]	(China) Bai Zhuoxuan [Q]	6–1, 6–1
Ladies' Singles 3rd Round (Note: This match started on Court 18 but after the second set, it was moved to No. 1 Court (after the conclusion of the Shapovalov-Broady match) due to nightfall.)	(Czech Republic) Marie Bouzková [32]	(France) Caroline Garcia [5]	7–6^{(7–0)}, 4–6, 7–5
Matches on No. 2 Court
Event	Winner	Loser	Score
Ladies' Singles 2nd Round	(Czech Republic) Petra Kvitova [9]	Aliaksandra Sasnovich	6–2, 6–2
Gentlemen's Singles 2nd Round	Daniil Medvedev [3]	(France) Adrian Mannarino	6–3, 6–3, 7–6^{(7–5)}
Gentlemen's Singles 2nd Round	(Germany) Alexander Zverev [19]	(Japan) Yosuke Watanuki [LL]	6–4, 5–7, 6–2, 6–2
Gentlemen's Singles 3rd Round	(Canada) Denis Shapovalov [26]	(United Kingdom) Liam Broady [WC]	4–6, 6–2, 7–5, 7–5
Matches on No. 3 Court
Event	Winner	Loser	Score
Gentlemen's Singles 2nd Round	(Denmark) Holger Rune [6]	(Spain) Roberto Carballes Baena	6–3, 7–6^{(7–3)}, 6–4
Gentlemen's Singles 3rd Round	(Italy) Jannik Sinner [8]	(France) Quentin Halys	3–6, 6–2, 6–3, 6–4
Ladies' Singles 3rd Round	(United States) Jessica Pegula [4]	(Italy) Elisabetta Cocciaretto	6–4, 6–0
Ladies' Singles 3rd Round	(Ukraine) Elina Svitolina [WC]	(United States) Sofia Kenin [Q]	7–6^{(7–3)}, 6–2
Matches began at 11 am (1:30 pm on Centre Court and 1:00 pm on No. 1 Court) BST

== Day 6 (8 July) ==
- Seeds out:
  - Gentlemen's Singles: (United States) Tommy Paul [16], (Germany) Alexander Zverev [19], (Chile) Nicolás Jarry [25], (Spain) Alejandro Davidovich Fokina [31]
  - Ladies' Doubles: (United States) Desirae Krawczyk / (Netherlands) Demi Schuurs [5]
- Schedule of play

Matches on main courts
Matches on Centre Court
Event	Winner	Loser	Score
Gentlemen's Singles 3rd Round	(Spain) Carlos Alcaraz [1]	(Chile) Nicolás Jarry [25]	6–3, 6–7^{(6–8)}, 6–3, 7–5
Ladies' Singles 3rd Round	(Tunisia) Ons Jabeur [6]	(Canada) Bianca Andreescu	3–6, 6–3, 6–4
Ladies' Singles 3rd Round	(Kazakhstan) Elena Rybakina [3]	(United Kingdom) Katie Boulter [WC]	6–1, 6–1
Matches on No. 1 Court
Event	Winner	Loser	Score
Gentlemen's Singles 3rd Round	Daniil Medvedev [3]	(Hungary) Márton Fucsovics	4–6, 6–3, 6–4, 6–4
Ladies' Singles 3rd Round	Aryna Sabalenka [2]	Anna Blinkova	6–2, 6–3
Gentlemen's Singles 3rd Round	(Italy) Matteo Berrettini	(Germany) Alexander Zverev [19]	6–3, 7–6^{(7–4)}, 7–6^{(7–5)}
Matches on No. 2 Court
Event	Winner	Loser	Score
Ladies' Singles 3rd Round	(Czech Republic) Petra Kvitová [9]	(Serbia) Natalija Stevanović [Q]	6–3, 7–5
Gentlemen's Singles 3rd Round	(Greece) Stefanos Tsitsipas [5]	(Serbia) Laslo Djere	6–4, 7–6^{(7–5)}, 6–4
Gentlemen's Singles 3rd Round	(United States) Frances Tiafoe [10] vs (Bulgaria) Grigor Dimitrov [21]		2–6, 3–6, 2–1 suspended
Matches on No. 3 Court
Event	Winner	Loser	Score
Ladies' Singles 3rd Round	(Brazil) Beatriz Haddad Maia [13]	(Romania) Sorana Cîrstea	6–2, 6–2
Gentlemen's Singles 3rd Round	(Denmark) Holger Rune [6]	(Spain) Alejandro Davidovich Fokina [31]	6–3, 4–6, 3–6, 6–4, 7–6^{(10–8)}
Ladies' Singles 3rd Round	Anastasia Potapova [22] vs Mirra Andreeva [Q]		cancelled
Matches began at 11 am (1:30 pm on Centre Court and 1:00 pm on No. 1 Court) BST

== Day 7 (9 July) ==
- Seeds out:
  - Gentlemen's Singles: (United States) Frances Tiafoe [10], (Kazakhstan) Alexander Bublik [23], (Canada) Denis Shapovalov [26]
  - Ladies' Singles: (Switzerland) Belinda Bencic [14], Victoria Azarenka [19], Anastasia Potapova [22], (Czech Republic) Marie Bouzková [32]
  - Gentlemen's Doubles: (El Salvador) Marcelo Arévalo / (Netherlands) Jean-Julien Rojer [7], (United Kingdom) Lloyd Glasspool / (France) Nicolas Mahut [11], (Argentina) Máximo González / (Argentina) Andrés Molteni [14]
  - Ladies' Doubles: (Canada) Leylah Fernandez / (United States) Taylor Townsend [6]
  - Mixed Doubles: (Poland) Jan Zieliński / (United States) Nicole Melichar-Martinez [3], (India) Rohan Bopanna / (Canada) Gabriela Dabrowski [6]
- Schedule of play

Matches on main courts
Matches on Centre Court
Event	Winner	Loser	Score
Gentlemen's Singles 4th Round	Andrey Rublev [7]	(Kazakhstan) Alexander Bublik [23]	7–5, 6–3, 6–7^{(6–8)}, 6–7^{(5–7)}, 6–4
Ladies' Singles 4th Round	(Poland) Iga Świątek [1]	(Switzerland) Belinda Bencic [14]	6–7^{(4–7)}, 7–6^{(7–2)}, 6–3
Gentlemen's Singles 4th Round	(Poland) Hubert Hurkacz [17] vs (Serbia) Novak Djokovic [2]		6–7^{(6–8)}, 6–7^{(6–8)}, suspended
Matches on No. 1 Court
Event	Winner	Loser	Score
Ladies' Singles 4th Round	(United States) Jessica Pegula [4]	(Ukraine) Lesia Tsurenko	6–1, 6–3
Gentlemen's Singles 4th Round	(Italy) Jannik Sinner [8]	(Colombia) Daniel Elahi Galán	7–6^{(7–4)}, 6–4, 6–3
Ladies' Singles 4th Round	(Ukraine) Elina Svitolina [WC]	Victoria Azarenka [19]	2–6, 6–4, 7–6^{(11–9)}
Matches on No. 2 Court
Event	Winner	Loser	Score
Ladies' Singles 4th Round	(Czech Republic) Markéta Vondroušová	(Czech Republic) Marie Bouzková [32]	2–6, 6–4, 6–3
Gentlemen's Singles 3rd Round	(Bulgaria) Grigor Dimitrov [21]	(United States) Frances Tiafoe [10]	6–2, 6–3, 6–2
Gentlemen's Singles 4th Round	Roman Safiullin	(Canada) Denis Shapovalov [26]	3–6, 6–3, 6–1, 6–3
Mixed Doubles 2nd Round	(Belgium) Joran Vliegen (China) Xu Yifan	(Australia) Alex de Minaur [WC] (United Kingdom) Katie Boulter [WC]	6–3, 4–6, 7–6^{(10–2)}
Matches on No. 3 Court
Event	Winner	Loser	Score
Gentlemen's Doubles 1st Round	(France) Arthur Fils (France) Luca Van Assche	(Greece) Petros Tsitsipas (Greece) Stefanos Tsitsipas	6–7^{(3–7)}, 6–4, 6–2
Ladies' Singles 3rd Round	Mirra Andreeva [Q]	Anastasia Potapova [22]	6–2, 7–5
Mixed Doubles 1st Round	(El Salvador) Marcelo Arévalo (Ukraine) Marta Kostyuk	(Australia) Jason Kubler [Alt] (New Zealand) Erin Routliffe [Alt]	7–5, 6–2
Ladies' Doubles 2nd Round	(United States) Coco Gauff [2] (United States) Jessica Pegula [2]	(Czech Republic) Anastasia Dețiuc [Alt] (Venezuela) Andrea Gámiz [Alt]	4–6, 6–1, 6–4
Girls' Singles 1st Round	(United Kingdom) Hannah Klugman	(Italy) Federica Urgesi [9]	6–2, 6–2
Matches began at 11 am (1:30 pm on Centre Court and 1:00 pm on No. 1 Court) BST

== Day 8 (10 July) ==
- Seeds out:
  - Gentlemen's Singles: (Greece) Stefanos Tsitsipas [5], (Poland) Hubert Hurkacz [17], (Bulgaria) Grigor Dimitrov [21]
  - Ladies' Singles: (Czech Republic) Petra Kvitová [9], (Brazil) Beatriz Haddad Maia [13], Ekaterina Alexandrova [21]
  - Gentlemen's Doubles: (Croatia) Ivan Dodig / (United States) Austin Krajicek [2], (France) Fabrice Martin / (Germany) Andreas Mies [8]
  - Ladies' Doubles: (Chinese Taipei) Chan Hao-ching / (Chinese Taipei) Latisha Chan [12], (Japan) Miyu Kato / (Indonesia) Aldila Sutjiadi [13], Victoria Azarenka / (Brazil) Beatriz Haddad Maia [14], (Ukraine) Marta Kostyuk / (Romania) Elena-Gabriela Ruse [15]
  - Mixed Doubles: (Netherlands) Wesley Koolhof / (Canada) Leylah Fernandez [4], (Netherlands) Jean-Julien Rojer / (Japan) Ena Shibahara [8]
- Schedule of play

Matches on main courts
Matches on Centre Court
Event	Winner	Loser	Score
Ladies' Singles 4th Round	(Kazakhstan) Elena Rybakina [3]	(Brazil) Beatriz Haddad Maia [13]	4–1, retired
Gentlemen's Singles 4th Round	(Serbia) Novak Djokovic [2]	(Poland) Hubert Hurkacz [17]	7–6^{(8–6)}, 7–6^{(8–6)}, 5–7, 6–4
Ladies' Singles 4th Round	(Tunisia) Ons Jabeur [6]	(Czech Republic) Petra Kvitová [9]	6–0, 6–3
Gentlemen's Singles 4th Round	(Spain) Carlos Alcaraz [1]	(Italy) Matteo Berrettini	3–6, 6–3, 6–3, 6–3
Matches on No. 1 Court
Event	Winner	Loser	Score
Gentlemen's Singles 4th Round	Daniil Medvedev [3]	(Czech Republic) Jiří Lehečka	6–4, 6–2, 0–0 retired
Ladies' Singles 4th Round	Aryna Sabalenka [2]	Ekaterina Alexandrova [21]	6–4, 6–0
Gentlemen's Singles 4th Round	(Denmark) Holger Rune [6]	(Bulgaria) Grigor Dimitrov [21]	3–6, 7–6^{(8–6)}, 7–6^{(7–4)}, 6–3
Matches on No. 2 Court
Event	Winner	Loser	Score
Ladies' Singles 4th Round	(United States) Madison Keys [25]	Mirra Andreeva [Q]	3–6, 7–6^{(7–4)}, 6–2
Gentlemen's Singles 4th Round	(United States) Chris Eubanks	(Greece) Stefanos Tsitsipas [5]	3–6, 7–6^{(7–4)}, 3–6, 6–4, 6–4
Gentlemen's Doubles 2nd Round	(Mexico) Santiago González [5] (France) Édouard Roger-Vasselin [5]	(United Kingdom) Toby Samuel [WC] (United Kingdom) Connor Thomson [WC]	6–3, 7–6^{(7–4)}
Boys Doubles 1st Round	(Czech Republic) Petr Brunclík (United States) Cooper Woestendick	(Netherlands) Thijs Boogaard (Netherlands) Abel Forger	1–6. 6–4, [12–10]
Matches on No. 3 Court
Event	Winner	Loser	Score
Gentlemen's Doubles 2nd Round	(India) Rohan Bopanna [6] (Australia) Matthew Ebden [6]	(United Kingdom) Jacob Fearnley [WC] (United Kingdom) Johannus Monday [WC]	7–5, 6–3
Gentlemen's Doubles 2nd Round	(Netherlands) Wesley Koolhof [1] (United Kingdom) Neal Skupski [1]	(Australia) Rinky Hijikata (Australia) Jason Kubler	7–6^{(7–3)}, 6–2
Mixed Doubles 2nd Round	(Australia) Matthew Ebden [5] (Australia) Ellen Perez [5]	(Germany) Kevin Krawietz (China) Yang Zhaoxuan	6–7^{(10–12)}, 6–4, 7–6^{(11–9)}
Ladies' Doubles 2nd Round	(Germany) Laura Siegemund; Vera Zvonareva	Victoria Azarenka [14] (Brazil) Beatriz Haddad Maia [14]	Walkover
Mixed Doubles 2nd Round	(El Salvador) Marcelo Arévalo (Ukraine) Marta Kostyuk	(United Kingdom) Jamie Murray (United States) Taylor Townsend	6–4, 3–6, 6–3
Matches began at 11 am (1:30 pm on Centre Court and 1:00 pm on No. 1 Court) BST

== Day 9 (11 July) ==
- Seeds out:
  - Gentlemen's Singles: Andrey Rublev [7]
  - Ladies' Singles: (Poland) Iga Świątek [1], (United States) Jessica Pegula [4]
  - Gentlemen's Doubles: (Monaco) Hugo Nys / (Poland) Jan Zieliński [4], (Mexico) Santiago González / (France) Édouard Roger-Vasselin [5], (Croatia) Nikola Mektić / (Croatia) Mate Pavić [9], (Belgium) Sander Gillé / (Belgium) Joran Vliegen [12], (Brazil) Marcelo Melo / (Australia) John Peers [16]
  - Ladies' Doubles: (United States) Coco Gauff / (United States) Jessica Pegula [2]
  - Mixed Doubles: (Australia) Matthew Ebden / (Australia) Ellen Perez [5]
- Schedule of play

Matches on main courts
Matches on Centre Court
Event	Winner	Loser	Score
Ladies' Singles Quarterfinals	(Ukraine) Elina Svitolina [WC]	(Poland) Iga Świątek [1]	7–5, 6–7^{(5–7)}, 6–2
Gentlemen's Singles Quarterfinals	(Serbia) Novak Djokovic [2]	Andrey Rublev [7]	4–6, 6–1, 6–4, 6–3
Matches on No. 1 Court
Event	Winner	Loser	Score
Ladies' Singles Quarterfinals	(Czech Republic) Markéta Vondroušová	(United States) Jessica Pegula [4]	6–4, 2–6, 6–4
Gentlemen's Singles Quarterfinals	(Italy) Jannik Sinner [8]	Roman Safiullin	6–4, 3–6, 6–2, 6–2
Ladies' Invitation Doubles	(Belgium) Kim Clijsters (Switzerland) Martina Hingis	(Italy) Francesca Schiavone (Italy) Roberta Vinci	6–4, 6–3
Matches on No. 2 Court
Event	Winner	Loser	Score
Gentlemen's Doubles 3rd Round	(Spain) Marcel Granollers [15] (Argentina) Horacio Zeballos [15]	(United States) Robert Galloway [PR] (South Africa) Lloyd Harris [PR]	7–6^{(7–5)}, 7–6^{(8–6)}
Gentlemen's Invitation Doubles	(United States) Bob Bryan (United States) Mike Bryan	(France) Sébastien Grosjean (Czech Republic) Radek Štěpánek	7–5, 6–3
Gentlemen's Doubles 3rd Round	(United Kingdom) Jamie Murray [13] (New Zealand) Michael Venus [13]	(Monaco) Hugo Nys [4] (Poland) Jan Zieliński [4]	6–4, 6–3
Ladies' Doubles Quarterfinals	(Chinese Taipei) Hsieh Su-wei [PR] (Czech Republic) Barbora Strýcová [PR]	(France) Caroline Garcia (Brazil) Luisa Stefani	7–6^{(7–5)}, 6–4
Matches on No. 3 Court
Event	Winner	Loser	Score
Ladies' Doubles Quarterfinals	(United States) Caroline Dolehide [16] (China) Zhang Shuai [16]	(Georgia (country)) Oksana Kalashnikova; Iryna Shymanovich	6–4, 6–1
Gentlemen's Doubles 3rd Round	(Netherlands) Wesley Koolhof [1] (United Kingdom) Neal Skupski [1]	(Australia) Max Purcell (Australia) Jordan Thompson	6–3, 7–6^{(7–3)}
Ladies' Invitation Doubles	(United Kingdom) Johanna Konta (India) Sania Mirza	(Germany) Andrea Petkovic (Slovakia) Magdaléna Rybáriková	6–3, 7–6^{(8–6)}
Ladies' Doubles 3rd Round	(Germany) Laura Siegemund; Vera Zvonareva	(United States) Coco Gauff [2] (United States) Jessica Pegula [2]	6–3, 6–3
Matches began at 11 am (1:30 pm on Centre Court and 1:00 pm on No. 1 Court) BST

== Day 10 (12 July) ==
- Seeds out:
  - Gentlemen's Singles: (Denmark) Holger Rune [6]
  - Ladies' Singles: (Kazakhstan) Elena Rybakina [3], (United States) Madison Keys [25]
  - Gentlemen's Doubles: (United Kingdom) Jamie Murray / (New Zealand) Michael Venus [13]
- Schedule of play

Matches on main courts
Matches on Centre Court
Event	Winner	Loser	Score
Ladies' Singles Quarterfinals	(Tunisia) Ons Jabeur [6]	(Kazakhstan) Elena Rybakina [3]	6–7^{(5–7)}, 6–4, 6–1
Gentlemen's Singles Quarterfinals	(Spain) Carlos Alcaraz [1]	(Denmark) Holger Rune [6]	7–6^{(7–3)}, 6–4, 6–4
Matches on No. 1 Court
Event	Winner	Loser	Score
Ladies' Singles Quarterfinals	Aryna Sabalenka [2]	(United States) Madison Keys [25]	6–2, 6–4
Gentlemen's Singles Quarterfinals	Daniil Medvedev [3]	(United States) Christopher Eubanks	6–4, 1–6, 4–6, 7–6^{(7–4)}, 6–1
Matches on No. 2 Court
Event	Winner	Loser	Score
Ladies' Doubles Quarterfinals	(Australia) Storm Hunter [3] (Belgium) Elise Mertens [3]	(United Kingdom) Naiktha Bains [WC] (United Kingdom) Maia Lumsden [WC]	6–2, 6–1
Gentlemen's Doubles Quarterfinals	(Germany) Kevin Krawietz [10] (Germany) Tim Pütz [10]	(United Kingdom) Jamie Murray [13] (New Zealand) Michael Venus [13]	6–4, 6–3
Ladies' Doubles Quarterfinals	(Czech Republic) Marie Bouzková (Spain) Sara Sorribes Tormo	(Germany) Laura Siegemund; Vera Zvonareva	7–6^{(7–2)}, 7–5
Ladies' Invitation Doubles	(Belgium) Kim Clijsters (Switzerland) Martina Hingis	(Germany) Andrea Petkovic (Slovakia) Magdaléna Rybáriková	6–3, 6–2
Matches on No. 3 Court
Event	Winner	Loser	Score
Gentlemen's Doubles Quarterfinals	(Spain) Marcel Granollers [15] (Argentina) Horacio Zeballos [15]	(United States) Nathaniel Lammons (United States) Jackson Withrow	6–4, 7–5
Gentlemen's Doubles Quarterfinals	(Netherlands) Wesley Koolhof [1] (United Kingdom) Neal Skupski [1]	(Uruguay) Ariel Behar (Czech Republic) Adam Pavlásek	4–6, 6–2, 6–3
Mixed Doubles Semifinals	(Croatia) Mate Pavić [7] (Ukraine) Lyudmyla Kichenok [7]	(United Kingdom) Jonny O'Mara (United Kingdom) Olivia Nicholls	7–6^{(8–6)}, 4–6, 6–3
Gentlemen's Invitation Doubles	(United States) Bob Bryan (United States) Mike Bryan	(Brazil) André Sá (Brazil) Bruno Soares	6–2, 6–3
Matches began at 11 am (1:30 pm on Centre Court and 1:00 pm on No. 1 Court) BST

== Day 11 (13 July) ==
- Seeds out:
  - Ladies' Singles: Aryna Sabalenka [2]
  - Gentlemen's Doubles: (India) Rohan Bopanna / (Australia) Matthew Ebden [6], (Germany) Kevin Krawietz / (Germany) Tim Pütz [10]
- Schedule of play

Matches on main courts
Matches on Centre Court
Event	Winner	Loser	Score
Ladies' Singles Semifinals	(Czech Republic) Markéta Vondroušová	(Ukraine) Elina Svitolina [WC]	6–3, 6–3
Ladies' Singles Semifinals	(Tunisia) Ons Jabeur [6]	Aryna Sabalenka [2]	6–7^{(5–7)}, 6–4, 6–3
Mixed Doubles Final	(Croatia) Mate Pavić [7] (Ukraine) Lyudmyla Kichenok [7]	(Belgium) Joran Vliegen (China) Xu Yifan	6–4, 6–7^{(9–11)} 6–3
Matches on No. 1 Court
Event	Winner	Loser	Score
Gentlemen's Doubles Semifinals	(Spain) Marcel Granollers [15] (Argentina) Horacio Zeballos [15]	(Germany) Kevin Krawietz [10] (Germany) Tim Pütz [10]	6–4, 6–3
Gentlemen's Doubles Semifinals	(Netherlands) Wesley Koolhof [1] (United Kingdom) Neal Skupski [1]	(India) Rohan Bopanna [6] (Australia) Matthew Ebden [6]	7–5, 6–4
Gentlemen's Wheelchair Doubles Semifinals	(United Kingdom) Alfie Hewett [1] (United Kingdom) Gordon Reid [1]	(Spain) Martín de la Puente (Argentina) Gustavo Fernández	7–5, 6–3
Ladies' Invitation Doubles	(Zimbabwe) Cara Black (Denmark) Caroline Wozniacki	(United States) Vania King (Kazakhstan) Yaroslava Shvedova	6–4, 6–3
Matches on No. 2 Court
Event	Winner	Loser	Score
Gentlemen's Invitation Doubles	(Germany) Tommy Haas (Australia) Mark Philippoussis	(France) Sébastien Grosjean (Czech Republic) Radek Štepánek	6–4, 6–3
Ladies' Invitation Doubles	(Slovakia) Daniela Hantuchová (United Kingdom) Laura Robson	(China) Li Na (Poland) Agnieszka Radwańska	6–3, 6–2
Mixed Invitation Doubles	(Serbia) Nenad Zimonjić (Australia) Rennae Stubbs	(United Kingdom) Andrew Castle (Croatia) Iva Majoli	6–3, 6–3
Mixed Invitation Doubles	(Australia) Todd Woodbridge (Australia) Alicia Molik	(France) Mansour Bahrami (France) Marion Bartoli	2–6, 6–3, [10–6]
Gentlemen's Invitation Doubles	(United States) James Blake (Australia) Lleyton Hewitt	(Austria) Jürgen Melzer (Luxembourg) Gilles Müller	6–3, 4–6, [10–6]
Matches on No. 3 Court
Event	Winner	Loser	Score
Girls' Singles Quarterfinal	(Czech Republic) Nikola Bartůňková	(United Kingdom) Ranah Stoiber	1–6, 6–1, 6–2
Boys' Singles Quarterfinal	(United Kingdom) Henry Searle	(Brazil) João Fonseca [8]	7–6^{(7–3)}, 6–3
Girls' Doubles Quarterfinal	(United Kingdom) Hannah Klugman (United Kingdom) Isabelle Lacy	(United States) Alexia Harmon (United States) Valeria Ray	6–4, 7–5
Boys' Doubles Quarterfinal	(Brazil) João Fonseca [2] (Bolivia) Juan Carlos Prado Ángelo [2]	(Poland) Tomasz Berkieta [8] (United Kingdom) Henry Searle [8]	6–3, 6–4
Matches began at 11 am (1:30 pm on Centre Court and 1:00 pm on No. 1 Court) BST

== Day 12 (14 July) ==
- Seeds out:
  - Gentlemen's Singles: Daniil Medvedev [3], (Italy) Jannik Sinner [8]
  - Ladies' Doubles: (United States) Caroline Dolehide / (China) Zhang Shuai [16]
- Schedule of play

Matches on main courts
Matches on Centre Court
Event	Winner	Loser	Score
Gentlemen's Singles Semifinals	(Serbia) Novak Djokovic [2]	(Italy) Jannik Sinner [8]	6–3, 6–4, 7–6^{(7–4)}
Gentlemen's Singles Semifinals	(Spain) Carlos Alcaraz [1]	Daniil Medvedev [3]	6–3, 6–3, 6–3
Matches on No. 1 Court
Event	Winner	Loser	Score
Ladies' Doubles Semifinals	(Australia) Storm Hunter [3] (Belgium) Elise Mertens [3]	(United States) Caroline Dolehide [16] (China) Zhang Shuai [16]	6–1, 6–1
Ladies' Doubles Semifinals	(Chinese Taipei) Hsieh Su-wei [PR] (Czech Republic) Barbora Strýcová [PR]	(Czech Republic) Marie Bouzková (Spain) Sara Sorribes Tormo	6–4, 6–1
Ladies' Wheelchair Singles Semifinals	(Netherlands) Jiske Griffioen	(Japan) Yui Kamiji [2]	6–3, 7–5
Ladies' Wheelchair Singles Semifinals	(Netherlands) Diede de Groot [1]	(Netherlands) Aniek van Koot	6–2, 6–0
Matches began at 1:30 pm on Centre Court and 1:00 pm on No. 1 Court (BST)

== Day 13 (15 July) ==
- Seeds out:
  - Ladies' Singles: (Tunisia) Ons Jabeur [6]
  - Gentlemen's Doubles: (Spain) Marcel Granollers / (Argentina) Horacio Zeballos [15]
- Schedule of play

Matches on main courts
Matches on Centre Court
Event	Winner	Loser	Score
Ladies' Singles Final	(Czech Republic) Markéta Vondroušová	(Tunisia) Ons Jabeur [6]	6–4, 6–4
Gentlemen's Doubles Final	(Netherlands) Wesley Koolhof [1] (United Kingdom) Neal Skupski [1]	(Spain) Marcel Granollers [15] (Argentina) Horacio Zeballos [15]	6–4, 6–4
Ladies' Invitation Doubles	(Belgium) Kim Clijsters (Switzerland) Martina Hingis	(United Kingdom) Johanna Konta (India) Sania Mirza	6–4, 6–1
Matches on No. 1 Court
Event	Winner	Loser	Score
Gentlemen's Wheelchair Singles Semifinals	(United Kingdom) Alfie Hewett [2]	(Spain) Martin de la Puente	6–3, 6–2
Ladies' Invitation Doubles	(Zimbabwe) Cara Black (Denmark) Caroline Wozniacki	(United Kingdom) Katie O'Brien (Poland) Agnieszka Radwańska	2–6, 6–2, [10–6]
Gentlemen's Wheelchair Doubles Final	(United Kingdom) Alfie Hewett [1] (United Kingdom) Gordon Reid [1]	(Japan) Takuya Miki (Japan) Tokito Oda	3–6, 6–0, 6–3
Ladies' Invitation Doubles	(United States) Vania King (Kazakhstan) Yaroslava Shvedova	(Slovakia) Daniela Hantuchová (United Kingdom) Laura Robson	6–0, 1–6, [10–3]
Matches on No. 3 Court
Event	Winner	Loser	Score
Gentlemen's Wheelchair Singles Semifinals	(Japan) Tokito Oda [1]	(United Kingdom) Gordon Reid [WC]	6–3, 6–4
Ladies' Wheelchair Singles Final	(Netherlands) Diede de Groot [1]	(Netherlands) Jiske Griffioen	6–2, 6–1
Wheelchair Quad Doubles Final	(Netherlands) Sam Schröder [1] (Netherlands) Niels Vink [1]	(Australia) Heath Davidson [2] (Canada) Robert Shaw [2]	7–6^{(7–5)}, 6–0
Gentlemen's Invitation Doubles	(United States) Bob Bryan (United States) Mike Bryan	(Germany) Tommy Haas (Australia) Mark Philippoussis	6–4, 6–2
Matches began at 11 am (2 pm on Centre Court) BST

== Day 14 (16 July) ==
- Seeds out:
  - Gentlemen's Singles: (Serbia) Novak Djokovic [2]
  - Ladies' Doubles: (Australia) Storm Hunter / (Belgium) Elise Mertens [3]
- Schedule of play

Matches on main courts
Matches on Centre Court
Event	Winner	Loser	Score
Gentlemen's Singles Final	(Spain) Carlos Alcaraz [1]	(Serbia) Novak Djokovic [2]	1–6, 7–6^{(8–6)}, 6–1, 3–6, 6–4
Ladies' Doubles Final	(Chinese Taipei) Hsieh Su-wei [PR] (Czech Republic) Barbora Strýcová [PR]	(Australia) Storm Hunter [3] (Belgium) Elise Mertens [3]	7–5, 6–4
Matches on No. 1 Court
Event	Winner	Loser	Score
Gentlemen's Wheelchair Singles Final	(Japan) Tokito Oda [1]	(United Kingdom) Alfie Hewett [2]	6–4, 6–2
Boys' Singles Final	(United Kingdom) Henry Searle	Yaroslav Demin [5]	6–4, 6–4
Gentlemen's Invitation Doubles Final	(United States) Bob Bryan (United States) Mike Bryan	(United States) James Blake (Australia) Lleyton Hewitt	6–4, 3–6, [10–6]
Matches on No. 3 Court
Event	Winner	Loser	Score
Wheelchair Quad Singles Final	(Netherlands) Niels Vink [1]	(Australia) Heath Davidson	6–1, 6–2
Ladies' Wheelchair Doubles Final	(Netherlands) Diede de Groot [2] (Netherlands) Jiske Griffioen [2]	(Japan) Yui Kamiji [1] (South Africa) Kgothatso Montjane [1]	6–1, 6–4
Girls' Doubles Final	(Czech Republic) Alena Kovačková (Czech Republic) Laura Samsonová	(United Kingdom) Hannah Klugman (United Kingdom) Isabelle Lacy	6–4, 7–5
Matches began at 11 am (2 pm on Centre Court) BST
