= 2023 Wimbledon Championships – Men's singles qualifying =

Men's singles qualifying
- 2023 Wimbledon Championships

Events
Singles	men	women		boys	girls
Doubles	men	women	mixed	boys	girls
WC Singles	men	women	quad
WC Doubles	men	women	quad
Legends	men	women	mixed
14&U Singles	boys	girls

Qualification
Singles	men	women
← 2022 ·	Wimbledon Championships	· 2024 →

The 2023 Wimbledon Championships – Men's singles qualifying was a series of tennis matches that took place from 26 to 29 June 2023 to determine the qualifiers for the 2023 Wimbledon Championships – Men's singles event, and, if necessary, the lucky losers.

16 of the 128 qualifiers who competed in this knockout tournament secured a main draw place.

== Seeds ==
The qualifying entry list was released based on the ATP rankings for the week of 29 May 2023. Seedings are based on ATP rankings as of 19 June 2023.

1. (Italy) Matteo Arnaldi (qualified)
2. (Australia) Thanasi Kokkinakis (first round)
3. (Hungary) Fábián Marozsán (qualifying competition, lucky loser)
4. (Japan) Taro Daniel (qualifying competition, lucky loser)
5. (Moldova) Radu Albot (qualified)
6. (Czech Republic) Tomáš Macháč (qualified)
7. (Australia) James Duckworth (second round)
8. (Japan) Yosuke Watanuki (qualifying competition, lucky loser)
9. (Australia) Rinky Hijikata (second round)
10. (Switzerland) Dominic Stricker (qualified)
11. (Austria) Jurij Rodionov (second round)
12. (Argentina) Facundo Díaz Acosta (first round)
13. (United States) Michael Mmoh (qualifying competition, lucky loser)
14. (United States) Aleksandar Kovacevic (qualifying competition)
15. (Spain) Pedro Martínez (first round)
16. (Hungary) Zsombor Piros (qualifying competition)
17. (Ecuador) Emilio Gómez (second round)
18. (France) Hugo Grenier (first round)
19. (Italy) Andrea Vavassori (first round)
20. (Brazil) Felipe Meligeni Alves (qualifying competition)
21. (Brazil) Thiago Seyboth Wild (qualifying competition)
22. (Finland) Otto Virtanen (qualifying competition)
23. (Italy) Giulio Zeppieri (second round)
24. (Argentina) Thiago Agustín Tirante (first round)
25. (France) Hugo Gaston (second round)
26. (Italy) Francesco Passaro (first round)
27. (Kazakhstan) Timofey Skatov (first round)
28. (Italy) Raúl Brancaccio (first round)
29. (Canada) Gabriel Diallo (second round)
30. (Austria) Filip Misolic (first round)
31. (United States) Nicolas Moreno de Alboran (first round)
32. Ivan Gakhov (first round)

== Qualifiers ==
1. (Italy) Matteo Arnaldi
2. (Germany) Oscar Otte
3. (Germany) Maximilian Marterer
4. (Belgium) Kimmer Coppejans
5. (Moldova) Radu Albot
6. (Czech Republic) Tomáš Macháč
7. (France) Harold Mayot
8. (Austria) Dennis Novak
9. (Chile) Tomás Barrios Vera
10. (Switzerland) Dominic Stricker
11. (Netherlands) Gijs Brouwer
12. (Japan) Sho Shimabukuro
13. (France) Laurent Lokoli
14. (France) Enzo Couacaud
15. (Serbia) Hamad Medjedovic
16. (Japan) Shintaro Mochizuki

== Lucky losers ==
1. (Japan) Taro Daniel
2. (Japan) Yosuke Watanuki
3. (United States) Michael Mmoh
4. (Hungary) Fábián Marozsán

== Draw ==
=== Key ===
- Q = Qualifier
- WC = Wild card
- LL = Lucky loser
- Alt = Alternate
- ITF = ITF entry
- PR = Protected ranking
- SR = Special ranking
- SE = Special exempt
- JE = Junior exempt
- JR = Junior Accelerator Programme entrant
- CO = College Accelerator Programme entrant
- NG = Next Gen Accelerator Program entrant
- w/o = Walkover
- r = Retired
- d = Defaulted

=== First qualifier ===
First round
1	(Italy) Matteo Arnaldi	3	7^{7}	7
(China) Shang Juncheng	6	6^{0}	5
(Italy) Federico Gaio	2	7^{7}	7
WC	(United Kingdom) Daniel Cox	6	6^{2}	5
(Portugal) Frederico Ferreira Silva	6	6
(Bosnia and Herzegovina) Damir Džumhur	3	4
(Italy) Riccardo Bonadio	4	2
17	(Ecuador) Emilio Gómez	6	6

Second round
1	(Italy) Matteo Arnaldi	7^{7}	6
(Italy) Federico Gaio	6^{5}	4
(Portugal) Frederico Ferreira Silva	6	6
17	(Ecuador) Emilio Gómez	2	4

Qualifying competition
1	(Italy) Matteo Arnaldi	7	6	6
(Portugal) Frederico Ferreira Silva	5	4	4

=== Second qualifier ===
First round
2	(Australia) Thanasi Kokkinakis	5	4
(Switzerland) Leandro Riedi	7	6
(Germany) Oscar Otte	6	6
(France) Benoît Paire	3	3
(United States) Zachary Svajda	6	5	6
(Argentina) Genaro Alberto Olivieri	1	7	3
(Australia) Marc Polmans	7^{7}	7
19	(Italy) Andrea Vavassori	6^{3}	5

Second round
(Switzerland) Leandro Riedi	3	6	3
(Germany) Oscar Otte	6	3	6
(United States) Zachary Svajda	6	3	3
(Australia) Marc Polmans	4	6	6

Qualifying competition
(Germany) Oscar Otte	6	7^{7}	4	7
(Australia) Marc Polmans	3	6^{4}	6	5

=== Third qualifier ===
First round
3	(Hungary) Fábián Marozsán	6	1	6
(Ukraine) Oleksii Krutykh	1	6	3
(Sweden) Elias Ymer	6	6
(France) Antoine Escoffier	4	4
(Germany) Maximilian Marterer	5	6	6
(Italy) Luciano Darderi	7	1	1
(Belgium) Gauthier Onclin	6	6
24	(Argentina) Thiago Agustín Tirante	2	0

Second round
3	(Hungary) Fábián Marozsán	6	7^{7}
(Sweden) Elias Ymer	3	6^{1}
(Germany) Maximilian Marterer	6	6
(Belgium) Gauthier Onclin	2	2

Qualifying competition
3	(Hungary) Fábián Marozsán	5	4	7^{7}	7	5
(Germany) Maximilian Marterer	7	6	6^{5}	5	7

=== Fourth qualifier ===
First round
4	(Japan) Taro Daniel	6	6
(Argentina) Marco Trungelliti	2	4
(Slovakia) Jozef Kovalík	2	6	4
(Italy) Luca Nardi	6	4	6
(United States) Brandon Holt	2	3
(Belgium) Zizou Bergs	6	6
(Belgium) Kimmer Coppejans	6^{3}	6	7^{13}
27	(Kazakhstan) Timofey Skatov	7^{7}	4	6^{11}

Second round
4	(Japan) Taro Daniel	6	6
(Italy) Luca Nardi	3	3
(Belgium) Zizou Bergs	4	6^{4}
(Belgium) Kimmer Coppejans	6	7^{7}

Qualifying competition
4	(Japan) Taro Daniel	3	6	6	4	2
(Belgium) Kimmer Coppejans	6	4	4	6	6

=== Fifth qualifier ===
First round
5	(Moldova) Radu Albot	6	7^{7}
(Dominican Republic) Nick Hardt	2	6^{2}
WC	(Croatia) Mili Poljičak	6	6^{4}	3
WC	(United Kingdom) Johannus Monday	3	7^{7}	6
PR	(Uruguay) Pablo Cuevas	6	6^{8}	7^{10}
PR	Egor Gerasimov	4	7^{10}	6^{2}
(Canada) Vasek Pospisil	2	6^{2}
20	(Brazil) Felipe Meligeni Alves	6	7^{7}

Second round
5	(Moldova) Radu Albot	3	7^{7}	6
WC	(United Kingdom) Johannus Monday	6	6^{2}	2
PR	(Uruguay) Pablo Cuevas	4	6^{3}
20	(Brazil) Felipe Meligeni Alves	6	7^{7}

Qualifying competition
5	(Moldova) Radu Albot	4	6	6	7^{8}
20	(Brazil) Felipe Meligeni Alves	6	3	2	6^{6}

=== Sixth qualifier ===
First round
6	(Czech Republic) Tomáš Macháč	7^{9}	6
(Japan) Yasutaka Uchiyama	6^{7}	4
(Italy) Franco Agamenone	6	6^{2}	2
(Japan) Kaichi Uchida	4	7^{7}	6
(Czech Republic) Zdeněk Kolář	6	3	3
PR	(France) Lucas Pouille	4	6	6
(France) Arthur Cazaux	6^{4}	4
23	(Italy) Giulio Zeppieri	7^{7}	6

Second round
6	(Czech Republic) Tomáš Macháč	4	6	6
(Japan) Kaichi Uchida	6	3	2
PR	(France) Lucas Pouille	6^{4}	6	6
23	(Italy) Giulio Zeppieri	7^{7}	3	3

Qualifying competition
6	(Czech Republic) Tomáš Macháč	3	3
PR	(France) Lucas Pouille	6	0^{r}

=== Seventh qualifier ===
First round
7	(Australia) James Duckworth	4	6	6
WC	(United Kingdom) Stuart Parker	6	3	1
(France) Geoffrey Blancaneaux	0	1
(France) Harold Mayot	6	6
(Italy) Matteo Gigante	6	7^{8}
WC	(United Kingdom) Harry Wendelken	3	6^{6}
(Turkey) Cem İlkel	3	6	1
29	(Canada) Gabriel Diallo	6	4	6

Second round
7	(Australia) James Duckworth	4	4
(France) Harold Mayot	6	6
(Italy) Matteo Gigante	6	6
29	(Canada) Gabriel Diallo	4	4

Qualifying competition
(France) Harold Mayot	6	6	6
(Italy) Matteo Gigante	4	2	2

=== Eighth qualifier ===
First round
8	(Japan) Yosuke Watanuki	7^{7}	7^{9}
(South Korea) Hong Seong-chan	6^{4}	6^{7}
(Turkey) Altuğ Çelikbilek	6	5	6
(Czech Republic) Dalibor Svrčina	0	7	2
(Italy) Alessandro Giannessi	4	7^{7}	3
WC	(United Kingdom) Charles Broom	6	6^{4}	6
(Austria) Dennis Novak	6	7
30	(Austria) Filip Misolic	3	5

Second round
8	(Japan) Yosuke Watanuki	7^{7}	6
(Turkey) Altuğ Çelikbilek	6^{4}	3
WC	(United Kingdom) Charles Broom	3	4
(Austria) Dennis Novak	6	6

Qualifying competition
8	(Japan) Yosuke Watanuki	7^{9}	3	3	4
(Austria) Dennis Novak	6^{7}	6	6	6

=== Ninth qualifier ===
First round
9	(Australia) Rinky Hijikata	7^{7}	7^{11}
PR	(Australia) Alex Bolt	6^{2}	6^{9}
Evgeny Donskoy	3	4
(Chile) Tomás Barrios Vera	6	6
PR	(France) Pierre-Hugues Herbert	6^{7}	6	7^{13}
(Chile) Alejandro Tabilo	7^{9}	4	6^{11}
(Netherlands) Jelle Sels	4	4
21	(Brazil) Thiago Seyboth Wild	6	6

Second round
9	(Australia) Rinky Hijikata	6^{3}	6^{2}
(Chile) Tomás Barrios Vera	7^{7}	7^{7}
PR	(France) Pierre-Hugues Herbert	5	6^{4}
21	(Brazil) Thiago Seyboth Wild	7	7^{7}

Qualifying competition
(Chile) Tomás Barrios Vera	6	6^{3}	2	6	6
21	(Brazil) Thiago Seyboth Wild	4	7^{7}	6	3	2

=== Tenth qualifier ===
First round
10	(Switzerland) Dominic Stricker	7	6
(United States) Steve Johnson	5	4
(Italy) Flavio Cobolli	3	4
(Argentina) Juan Pablo Ficovich	6	6
(Belgium) Raphaël Collignon	7^{7}	3	6
(China) Bu Yunchaokete	6^{5}	6	3
(Italy) Mattia Bellucci	6	6
32	Ivan Gakhov	3	4

Second round
10	(Switzerland) Dominic Stricker	6	6
(Argentina) Juan Pablo Ficovich	4	3
(Belgium) Raphaël Collignon	4	4
(Italy) Mattia Bellucci	6	6

Qualifying competition
10	(Switzerland) Dominic Stricker	6	1	6	6
(Italy) Mattia Bellucci	3	6	3	4

=== Eleventh qualifier ===
First round
11	(Austria) Jurij Rodionov	6	6
(Tunisia) Aziz Dougaz	3	1
(Netherlands) Gijs Brouwer	6	6
WC	(United Kingdom) Luca Pow	3	1
(Italy) Andrea Pellegrino	1	1
(Japan) Rio Noguchi	6	6
(Switzerland) Henri Laaksonen	1	4
22	(Finland) Otto Virtanen	6	6

Second round
11	(Austria) Jurij Rodionov	5	3
(Netherlands) Gijs Brouwer	7	6
(Japan) Rio Noguchi	3	3
22	(Finland) Otto Virtanen	6	6

Qualifying competition
(Netherlands) Gijs Brouwer	6	6	6
22	(Finland) Otto Virtanen	4	2	4

=== Twelfth qualifier ===
First round
12	(Argentina) Facundo Díaz Acosta	7^{7}	3	4
(Japan) Sho Shimabukuro	6^{5}	6	6
WC	(United Kingdom) Toby Samuel	6	7^{7}
(Switzerland) Antoine Bellier	4	6^{5}
(Chinese Taipei) Tseng Chun-hsin	3	6	1
(Chinese Taipei) Wu Tung-lin	6	3	6
(United States) Denis Kudla	6	6
26	(Italy) Francesco Passaro	4	4

Second round
(Japan) Sho Shimabukuro	5	6	6
WC	(United Kingdom) Toby Samuel	7	1	4
(Chinese Taipei) Wu Tung-lin	3	4
(United States) Denis Kudla	6	6

Qualifying competition
(Japan) Sho Shimabukuro	6	6	6
(United States) Denis Kudla	4	4	4

=== Thirteenth qualifier ===
First round
13	(United States) Michael Mmoh	6	3	7^{10}
(Bulgaria) Adrian Andreev	4	6	6^{4}
(Sweden) Dragoș Nicolae Mădăraș	7	6
Alt	(Australia) Dane Sweeny	5	2
(Romania) Nicholas David Ionel	1	6^{7}
(France) Laurent Lokoli	6	7^{9}
(Slovakia) Norbert Gombos	6	2	6
31	(United States) Nicolas Moreno de Alboran	2	6	4

Second round
13	(United States) Michael Mmoh	3	6	6
(Sweden) Dragoș Nicolae Mădăraș	6	1	4
(France) Laurent Lokoli	6	7^{7}
(Slovakia) Norbert Gombos	3	6^{2}

Qualifying competition
13	(United States) Michael Mmoh	6	6^{2}	3	6	2
(France) Laurent Lokoli	2	7^{7}	6	2	6

=== Fourteenth qualifier ===
First round
14	(United States) Aleksandar Kovacevic	7	6
(Argentina) Andrea Collarini	5	3
(Netherlands) Jesper de Jong	6	6
(Chinese Taipei) Hsu Yu-hsiou	3	2
(Bulgaria) Dimitar Kuzmanov	2	6	3
PR	(South Korea) Chung Hyeon	6	3	6
(France) Enzo Couacaud	6	7^{7}
28	(Italy) Raúl Brancaccio	4	6^{3}

Second round
14	(United States) Aleksandar Kovacevic	7^{7}	6
(Netherlands) Jesper de Jong	6^{5}	4
PR	(South Korea) Chung Hyeon	1	0^{r}
(France) Enzo Couacaud	6	2

Qualifying competition
14	(United States) Aleksandar Kovacevic	6	4	6^{5}	6^{5}
(France) Enzo Couacaud	2	6	7^{7}	7^{7}

=== Fifteenth qualifier ===
First round
15	(Spain) Pedro Martínez	0	1
(Serbia) Hamad Medjedovic	6	6
(Lithuania) Ričardas Berankis	6	6
(Argentina) Mariano Navone	1	2
WC	(United Kingdom) Billy Harris	5	7^{7}	6
(Switzerland) Alexander Ritschard	7	6^{5}	2
(Italy) Francesco Maestrelli	5	4
25	(France) Hugo Gaston	7	6

Second round
(Serbia) Hamad Medjedovic	7^{7}	6^{2}	6
(Lithuania) Ričardas Berankis	6^{2}	7^{7}	4
WC	(United Kingdom) Billy Harris	2	7^{7}	6
25	(France) Hugo Gaston	6	6^{5}	4

Qualifying competition
(Serbia) Hamad Medjedovic	6	7^{8}	6
WC	(United Kingdom) Billy Harris	4	6^{6}	4

=== Sixteenth qualifier ===
First round
16	(Hungary) Zsombor Piros	7^{9}	1	6
(Belgium) Joris De Loore	6^{7}	6	1
(Spain) Pablo Llamas Ruiz	6	7^{7}
(Austria) Maximilian Neuchrist	4	6^{2}
(Slovakia) Lukáš Klein	6	6
(Czech Republic) Vít Kopřiva	3	4
(Japan) Shintaro Mochizuki	6	7^{7}
18	(France) Hugo Grenier	2	6^{3}

Second round
16	(Hungary) Zsombor Piros	6	7^{7}
(Spain) Pablo Llamas Ruiz	4	6^{1}
(Slovakia) Lukáš Klein	7^{8}	3	2
(Japan) Shintaro Mochizuki	6^{6}	6	6

Qualifying competition
16	(Hungary) Zsombor Piros	3	4	1
(Japan) Shintaro Mochizuki	6	6	6
