= Jakub Filip =

Czech tennis player (born 2005)

- Country (sports): Czech Republic
- Born: 25 September 2005 (age 21) Hradec Králové, Czechia
- Height: 1.80 m (5 ft 11 in)
- Plays: Right-handed (two-handed backhand)
- Coach: David Pultr
- Prize money: US $28,128

Singles
- Career record: 0–0 (at ATP Tour level, Grand Slam level, and in Davis Cup)
- Career titles: 0
- Highest ranking: No. 736 (14 July 2025)
- Current ranking: No. 792 (9 November 2026)

Grand Slam singles results
- Australian Open Junior: 3R (2023)
- French Open Junior: 1R (2023)
- Wimbledon Junior: 1R (2023)
- US Open Junior: 1R (2023)

Doubles
- Career record: 0–0 (at ATP Tour level, Grand Slam level, and in Davis Cup)
- Career titles: 0
- Highest ranking: No. 938 (21 October 2024)
- Current ranking: No. 1,696 (9 November 2026)

Grand Slam doubles results
- Australian Open Junior: 1R (2023)
- Wimbledon Junior: W (2023)
- US Open Junior: 1R (2023)
- Last updated on: 9 November 2026.

Jakub Filip (born 25 September 2005) is a Czech tennis player. He has a career-high singles ranking of world No. 736 achieved on 14 July 2025 and a doubles ranking of No. 938 achieved on 21 October 2024.

Filip won the 2023 boys' doubles title at Wimbledon with Gabriele Vulpitta.

== Career ==
=== Junior career ===
From Dvůr Králové nad Labem, he is a member of TK Sparta Prague. Filip made his junior grand slam debut at the 2023 Australian Open. Preparation for the tournament included practising with former top-ten player Tomáš Berdych.

Playing in the boys' singles at the 2023 Wimbledon Championships he lost in the first round to Brit Charlie Robertson. However, he enjoyed more success in the boys doubles, reaching the final alongside his Italian partner Gabriele Vulpitta. They won the final in straight sets against Arthur Géa and Branko Đurić.

== ITF World Tennis Tour finals ==
=== Singles: 1 (1 title) ===
Legend ITF WTT (1–0)

Result	W–L	Date	Tournament	Tier	Surface	Opponent	Score
Win	1–0	Jul 2024	M15 Poprad, Slovakia	WTT	Clay	(Slovakia) Andrej Martin	6–1, 6–2

=== Doubles: 1 (1 title) ===
Legend ITF WTT (1–0)

Result	W–L	Date	Tournament	Tier	Surface	Partner	Opponents	Score
Win	1–0	Jul 2024	M15 Poprad, Slovakia	WTT	Clay	(Czech Republic) Petr Brunclík	(Slovakia) Miloš Karol (Slovakia) Tomáš Lánik	6–4, 6–4

== Junior Grand Slam finals ==
=== Doubles: 1 (1 title) ===
Result	Year	Tournament	Surface	Partner	Opponents	Score
Win	2023	Wimbledon	Grass	(Italy) Gabriele Vulpitta	(Serbia) Branko Đurić (France) Arthur Géa	6–3, 6–3
