= Alanis Hamilton =

American tennis player (born 2007)

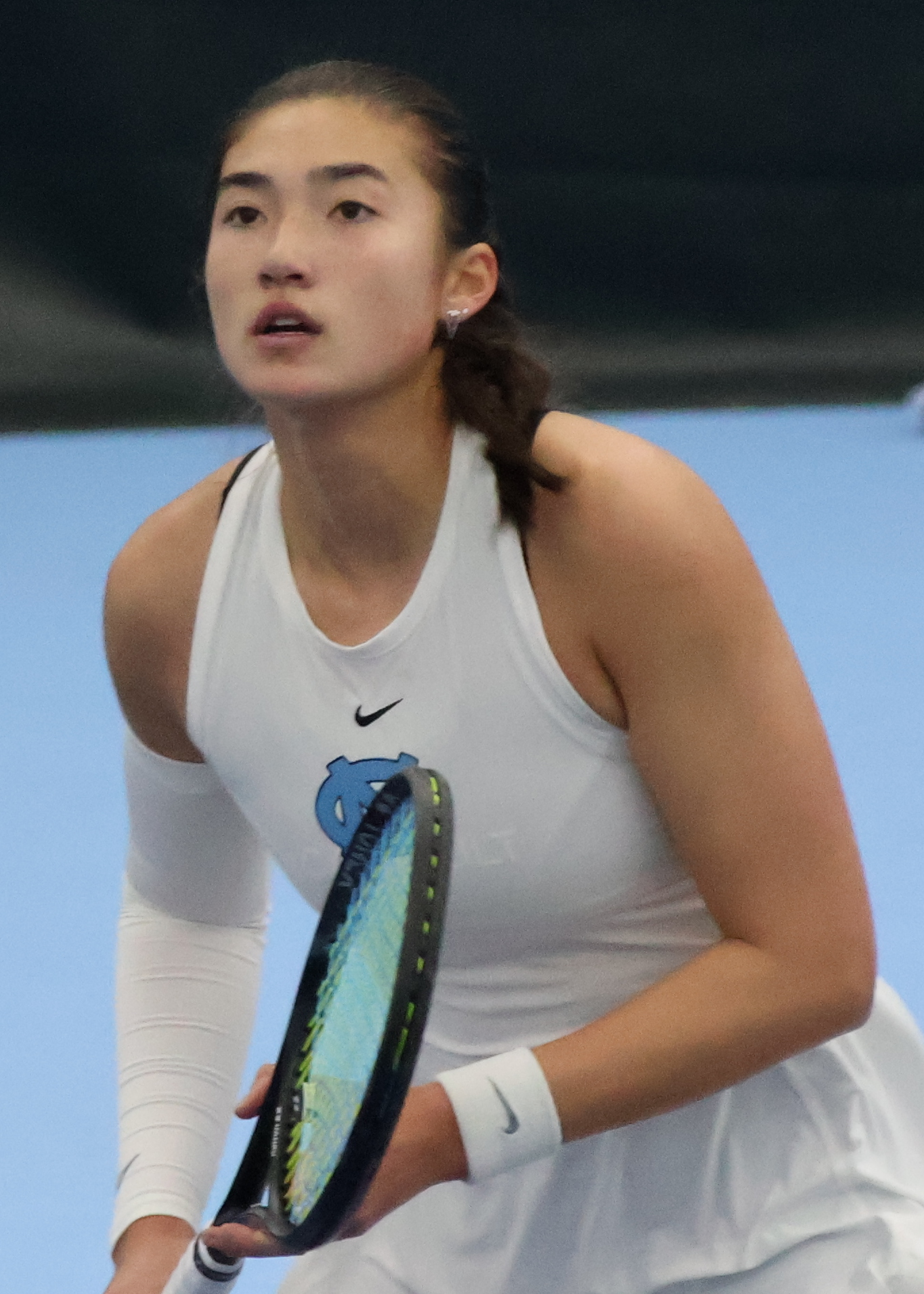
- Hamilton with North Carolina in 2026
- Country (sports): United States
- Born: 11 May 2007 (age 19)
- College: North Carolina
- Prize money: US$5,122

Singles
- Highest ranking: No. 979 (27 July 2024)

Doubles
- Highest ranking: No. 691 (17 July 2025)
- Current ranking: No. 716 (25 August 2025)

Grand Slam doubles results
- US Open: 2R (2025)
- Wimbledon Junior: SF (2025)
- Last updated on: 1 June 2025.

Alanis Hamilton (born 11 May 2007) is an American tennis player. She plays college tennis for the North Carolina Tar Heels.

== Early life ==
Originally from Plano, Texas, she was the 2024 Texas Slam Girls 18 & Over Singles Champion. She attended the University of North Carolina at Charlotte on a full athletic scholarship.

== Junior career ==
She was a semi-finalist in the girls' doubles alongside Tatum Evans at the 2023 Wimbledon Championships, where they were defeated by British pair Hannah Klugman and Isabelle Lacy.

== NCAA ==
Alongside Reese Brantmeier she won the inaugural USTA American Collegiate Playoff in 2025 and entered the 2025-26 collegiate season as the number one ranked ITA Preseason Doubles pairing.

== Professional career ==
She made her Grand Slam main draw debut at the 2025 US Open, receiving a wildcard into the doubles main draw with Reese Brantmeier after winning a collegiate wildcard tournament. They were drawn against compatriots Kristina Penickova and Thea Frodin in the first round.
