= 2023 Wimbledon Championships – Mixed invitation doubles =

Mixed invitation doubles
- 2023 Wimbledon Championships

Final
- Champions: (Serbia) Nenad Zimonjić (Australia) Rennae Stubbs
- Runners-up: (United Kingdom) Greg Rusedski (Spain) Conchita Martínez
- Score: 6–2, 6–2

Events
| Singles | men | women | | boys | girls |
| Doubles | men | women | mixed | boys | girls |
| WC Singles | men | women | quad |
| WC Doubles | men | women | quad |
| Legends | men | women | mixed |
| 14&U Singles | boys | girls |
| ← 2022 · | Wimbledon Championships | · 2024 → |

The 2023 Wimbledon Championships features the second edition of the mixed invitational doubles event, an exhibition event pitting former professional tennis players against one another.

Nenad Zimonjić and Marion Bartoli were the reigning champions, but chose not to defend the title together. Zimonjić partnered with Rennae Stubbs and defeated Greg Rusedski and Conchita Martínez in the final, 6–2, 6–2 to win the mixed invitation doubles tennis title at the 2023 Wimbledon Championships. Bartoli partnered with Mansour Bahrami, but they were eliminated in the round robin stage.

== Format ==
Sixteen former professional tennis players competed in a round-robin stage in pairs of two distributed over two groups. The winners of each group faced each other in the final.

== Draw ==
=== Key ===
- Q = Qualifier
- WC = Wild card
- LL = Lucky loser
- Alt = Alternate
- ITF = ITF entry
- PR = Protected ranking
- SR = Special ranking
- SE = Special exempt
- JE = Junior exempt
- JR = Junior Accelerator Programme entrant
- CO = College Accelerator Programme entrant
- NG = Next Gen Accelerator Program entrant
- w/o = Walkover
- r = Retired
- d = Defaulted

=== Final ===
| Final |
| A4 | (Serbia) Nenad Zimonjić (Australia) Rennae Stubbs | 6 | 6 |
| B4 | (United Kingdom) Greg Rusedski (Spain) Conchita Martínez | 2 | 2 |

=== Group A ===
| | | (Australia) Woodforde (United States) Navratilova | (Sweden) Johansson (Austria) Schett | (Croatia) Ivanišević (United Kingdom) Castle (Croatia) Majoli | (Serbia) Zimonjić (Australia) Stubbs | RR; W–L | Set; W–L | Game; W–L | Standings |
| A1 | (Australia) Mark Woodforde (United States) Martina Navratilova | | 3–6, 3–6 | w/o (w/ Ivanišević) | w/o | 1–2 | 0–2 | 6–12 | 3 |
| A2 | (Sweden) Thomas Johansson (Austria) Barbara Schett | 6–3, 6–3 | | 6–3, 6–4 (w/ Castle) | 4–6, 5–7 | 2–1 | 4–2 | 33–26 | 2 |
| A3 | (Croatia) Goran Ivanišević (United Kingdom) Andrew Castle (Croatia) Iva Majoli | w/o (w/ Ivanišević) | 3–6, 4–6 (w/ Castle) | | 3–6, 3–6 (w/ Castle) | 0–3 | 0–4 | 13–24 | 4 |
| A4 | (Serbia) Nenad Zimonjić (Australia) Rennae Stubbs | w/o | 6–4, 7–5 | 6–3, 6–3 (w/ Castle) | | 3–0 | 4–0 | 25–15 | 1 |

=== Group B ===
| | | (Australia) Woodbridge (Australia) Molik | (France) Bahrami (France) Bartoli | (Sweden) Enqvist (United Kingdom) Keothavong | (United Kingdom) Rusedski (Spain) Martínez | RR; W–L | Set; W–L | Game; W–L | Standings |
| B1 | (Australia) Todd Woodbridge (Australia) Alicia Molik | | 2–6, 6–3, [10–6] | 2–6, 6–3, [10–5] | 7–5, 2–6, [11–13] | 2–1 | 5–4 | 27–30 | 2 |
| B2 | (France) Mansour Bahrami (France) Marion Bartoli | 6–2, 3–6, [6–10] | | 2–6, 4–6 | 6–3, ret. | 1–2 | 2–4 | 21–24 | 4 |
| B3 | (Sweden) Thomas Enqvist (United Kingdom) Anne Keothavong | 6–2, 3–6, [5–10] | 6–2, 6–4 | | 5–7, 6–3, [10–12] | 1–2 | 4–4 | 32–26 | 3 |
| B4 | (United Kingdom) Greg Rusedski (Spain) Conchita Martínez | 5–7, 6–2, [13–11] | 3–6, ret. | 7–5, 3–6, [12–10] | | 2–1 | 4–3 | 26–27 | 1 |

== Bibliography ==
- Mixed Invitation Doubles
