= 2023 Wimbledon Championships – Boys' doubles =

Boys' doubles
- 2023 Wimbledon Championships

Final
- Champions: (Czech Republic) Jakub Filip (Italy) Gabriele Vulpitta
- Runners-up: (Serbia) Branko Djuric (France) Arthur Géa
- Score: 6–3, 6–3

Events
Singles	men	women		boys	girls
Doubles	men	women	mixed	boys	girls
WC Singles	men	women	quad
WC Doubles	men	women	quad
14&U Singles	boys	girls
Legends	men	women	mixed
- Wimbledon Championships

Jakub Filip and Gabriele Vulpitta defeated Branko Djuric and Arthur Géa in the final, 6–3, 6–3 to win the boys' doubles tennis title at the 2023 Wimbledon Championships.

Sebastian Gorzny and Alex Michelsen were the reigning champions, but were no longer eligible to participate in junior tournaments.

== Seeds ==
1. Yaroslav Demin / (United States) Cooper Williams (quarterfinals)
2. (Brazil) João Fonseca / (Bolivia) Juan Carlos Prado Ángelo (semifinals)
3. (Spain) Alejandro Melero Kretzer / (Mexico) Rodrigo Pacheco Méndez (quarterfinals)
4. (Bulgaria) Adriano Dzhenev / (Bulgaria) Iliyan Radulov (first round)
5. (Czech Republic) Maxim Mrva / (Austria) Joel Schwärzler (first round)
6. (Serbia) Branko Djuric / (France) Arthur Géa (final)
7. (United States) Darwin Blanch / (United States) Roy Horovitz (semifinals)
8. (Poland) Tomasz Berkieta / (United Kingdom) Henry Searle (quarterfinals)

== Draw ==
Key

- Q = Qualifier
- WC = Wild card
- LL = Lucky loser
- Alt = Alternate
- ITF = ITF entry
- PR = Protected ranking
- SR = Special ranking
- SE = Special exempt
- JE = Junior exempt
- JR = Junior Accelerator Programme entrant
- CO = College Accelerator Programme entrant
- NG = Next Gen Accelerator Program entrant
- w/o = Walkover
- r = Retired
- d = Defaulted

=== Finals ===
Semifinals
7	(United States) Darwin Blanch (United States) Roy Horovitz	4	4
6	(Serbia) Branko Djuric (France) Arthur Géa	6	6
(Czech Republic) Jakub Filip (Italy) Gabriele Vulpitta	7^{7}	6
2	(Brazil) João Fonseca (Bolivia) Juan Carlos Prado Ángelo	6^{3}	2

Final
6	(Serbia) Branko Djuric (France) Arthur Géa	3	3
(Czech Republic) Jakub Filip (Italy) Gabriele Vulpitta	6	6

=== Top half ===
First round
1	Yaroslav Demin (United States) Cooper Williams	7	7
(Sweden) Max Dahlin (Netherlands) Mees Röttgering	5	5
(Italy) Carlo Alberto Caniato (Italy) Filippo Romano	6	6
(South Korea) Kim Jang-jun (Japan) Hayato Matsuoka	1	4
WC	(United Kingdom) Freddie Blaydes (United Kingdom) Benjamin Gusic Wan	4	6	[10]
(Italy) Fabio De Michele (Germany) David Fix	6	3	[6]
(United Kingdom) Oliver Bonding (Australia) Charlie Camus	6^{4}	5
7	(United States) Darwin Blanch (United States) Roy Horovitz	7^{7}	7
3	(Spain) Alejandro Melero Kretzer (Mexico) Rodrigo Pacheco Méndez	6^{5}	6	[11]
(Czech Republic) Vít Kalina (Slovenia) Matic Križnik	7^{7}	4	[9]
(Argentina) Fernando Cavallo (Venezuela) Ignacio Parisca	6	6
(Ukraine) Volodymyr Iakubenko (Italy) Lorenzo Sciahbasi	4	4
(Czech Republic) Petr Brunclík (United States) Cooper Woestendick	1	6	[12]
(Netherlands) Thijs Boogaard (Netherlands) Abel Forger	6	4	[10]
WC	(United Kingdom) Hugo Coquelin (United Kingdom) Luca Pow	6^{5}	7^{7}	[5]
6	(Serbia) Branko Djuric (France) Arthur Géa	7^{7}	6^{3}	[10]

Second round
1	Y Demin (United States) C Williams	2	6	[13]
(Italy) CA Caniato (Italy) F Romano	6	1	[11]
WC	(United Kingdom) F Blaydes (United Kingdom) B Gusic Wan	2	4
7	(United States) Dar Blanch (United States) R Horovitz	6	6
3	(Spain) A Melero Kretzer (Mexico) R Pacheco Méndez	7	6
(Argentina) F Cavallo (Venezuela) I Parisca	5	4
(Czech Republic) P Brunclík (United States) C Woestendick	3	2
6	(Serbia) B Djuric (France) A Géa	6	6

Quarterfinals
1	Y Demin (United States) C Williams	3	5
7	(United States) Dar Blanch (United States) R Horovitz	6	7
3	(Spain) A Melero Kretzer (Mexico) R Pacheco Méndez	3	6^{3}
6	(Serbia) B Djuric (France) A Géa	6	7^{7}

Semifinals
7	(United States) Dar Blanch (United States) R Horovitz	4	4
6	(Serbia) B Djuric (France) A Géa	6	6

=== Bottom half ===
First round
5	(Czech Republic) Maxim Mrva (Austria) Joel Schwärzler	4	3
(France) Paul Barbier Gazeu (Serbia) Vuk Rađenović	6	6
(Czech Republic) Jakub Filip (Italy) Gabriele Vulpitta	7^{7}	6^{3}	[11]
(Australia) Hayden Jones (United States) Alexander Razeghi	6^{3}	7^{7}	[9]
(France) Antoine Ghibaudo (United States) Kyle Kang	4	2
WC	(United Kingdom) Viktor Frydrych (United Kingdom) Phoenix Weir	6	6
(Italy) Federico Bondioli (Italy) Federico Cinà	6	6^{9}	[11]
4	(Bulgaria) Adriano Dzhenev (Bulgaria) Iliyan Radulov	4	7^{11}	[9]
8	(Poland) Tomasz Berkieta (United Kingdom) Henry Searle	6	6
(Canada) Duncan Chan (Canada) Keegan Rice	4	4
(Romania) Mihai Alexandru Coman (Sweden) Kevin Edengren	7^{7}	2	[5]
(United States) Kaylan Bigun (China) Zhou Yi	6^{2}	6	[10]
(Norway) Nicolai Budkov Kjær (Sweden) Sebastian Eriksson	6	6
(Czech Republic) Jan Hrazdil (Japan) Rei Sakamoto	3	4
WC	(United Kingdom) Henry Jefferson (United Kingdom) Charlie Robertson	2	4
2	(Brazil) João Fonseca (Bolivia) Juan Carlos Prado Ángelo	6	6

Second round
(France) P Barbier Gazeu (Serbia) V Rađenović	4	4
(Czech Republic) J Filip (Italy) G Vulpitta	6	6
WC	(United Kingdom) V Frydrych (United Kingdom) P Weir	3	2
(Italy) F Bondioli (Italy) F Cinà	6	6
8	(Poland) T Berkieta (United Kingdom) H Searle	6	6
(United States) K Bigun (China) Y Zhou	4	4
(Norway) N Budkov Kjær (Sweden) S Eriksson	7^{7}	3	[6]
2	(Brazil) J Fonseca (Bolivia) JC Prado Ángelo	6^{5}	6	[10]

Quarterfinals
(Czech Republic) J Filip (Italy) G Vulpitta	7	3	[11]
(Italy) F Bondioli (Italy) F Cinà	5	6	[9]
8	(Poland) T Berkieta (United Kingdom) H Searle	3	4
2	(Brazil) J Fonseca (Bolivia) JC Prado Ángelo	6	6

Semifinals
(Czech Republic) J Filip (Italy) G Vulpitta	7^{7}	6
2	(Brazil) J Fonseca (Bolivia) JC Prado Ángelo	6^{3}	2
