= 2023 Wimbledon Championships – Boys' singles =

Boys' singles
- 2023 Wimbledon Championships

Final
- Champion: (United Kingdom) Henry Searle
- Runner-up: Yaroslav Demin
- Score: 6–4, 6–4

Events
Singles	men	women		boys	girls
Doubles	men	women	mixed	boys	girls
WC Singles	men	women	quad
WC Doubles	men	women	quad
14&U Singles	boys	girls
Legends	men	women	mixed
- Wimbledon Championships

Henry Searle won the title, defeating Yaroslav Demin in the final, 6–4, 6–4. Searle became the first British boy to lift the Wimbledon trophy since Stanley Matthews won the Championships in 1962.

Mili Poljičak was the defending champion, but was no longer eligible to participate in junior events.

== Seeds ==
1. (Bolivia) Juan Carlos Prado Ángelo (first round)
2. (Mexico) Rodrigo Pacheco Méndez (third round)
3. (China) Zhou Yi (third round)
4. (United States) Cooper Williams (semifinals)
5. Yaroslav Demin (final)
6. (Bulgaria) Iliyan Radulov (quarterfinals)
7. (Serbia) Branko Djuric (first round)
8. (Brazil) João Fonseca (quarterfinals)
9. (United States) Darwin Blanch (semifinals)
10. (Austria) Joel Schwärzler (first round)
11. (Japan) Rei Sakamoto (third round)
12. (Bulgaria) Adriano Dzhenev (first round)
13. (Czech Republic) Maxim Mrva (first round)
14. (Italy) Federico Bondioli (second round)
15. (Poland) Tomasz Berkieta (quarterfinals)
16. (Spain) Alejandro Melero Kretzer (third round)

Click on the seed number of a player to go to their draw section.

== Draw ==
Key

- Q = Qualifier
- WC = Wild card
- LL = Lucky loser
- Alt = Alternate
- ITF = ITF entry
- PR = Protected ranking
- SR = Special ranking
- SE = Special exempt
- JE = Junior exempt
- JR = Junior Accelerator Programme entrant
- CO = College Accelerator Programme entrant
- NG = Next Gen Accelerator Program entrant
- w/o = Walkover
- r = Retired
- d = Defaulted

=== Finals ===
Quarterfinals
(United Kingdom) Henry Searle	7^{7}	6
8	(Brazil) João Fonseca	6^{3}	3
4	(United States) Cooper Williams	7^{7}	6
6	(Bulgaria) Iliyan Radulov	6^{4}	3
9	(United States) Darwin Blanch	7^{7}	6
(United States) Kaylan Bigun	6^{3}	3
5	Yaroslav Demin	7^{7}	7^{8}
15	(Poland) Tomasz Berkieta	6^{5}	6^{6}

Semifinals
(United Kingdom) Henry Searle	7^{7}	6
4	(United States) Cooper Williams	6^{4}	3
9	(United States) Darwin Blanch	6	3	4
5	Yaroslav Demin	4	6	6

Final
(United Kingdom) Henry Searle	6	6
5	Yaroslav Demin	4	4

=== Top half ===
==== Section 1 ====
First round
1	(Bolivia) Juan Carlos Prado Ángelo	6^{6}	3
(United Kingdom) Henry Searle	7^{8}	6
(Australia) Hayden Jones	2	4
Q	(India) Manas Dhamne	6	6
(Germany) David Fix	2	3
(France) Arthur Géa	6	6
(United States) Alexander Razeghi	7	4	5
14	(Italy) Federico Bondioli	5	6	7
11	(Japan) Rei Sakamoto	7^{7}	6
Q	(Italy) Carlo Alberto Caniato	6^{1}	4
(Netherlands) Thijs Boogaard	6	3	7
Q	(Australia) Pavle Marinkov	1	6	5
(Czech Republic) Jakub Filip	4	2
WC	(United Kingdom) Charlie Robertson	6	6
(South Korea) Kim Jang-jun	5	2
8	(Brazil) João Fonseca	7	6

Second round
(United Kingdom) H Searle	6	6
Q	(India) M Dhamne	1	4
(France) A Géa	6	6
14	(Italy) F Bondioli	4	2
11	(Japan) R Sakamoto	7^{7}	7^{7}
(Netherlands) T Boogaard	6^{5}	6^{5}
WC	(United Kingdom) C Robertson	1	4
8	(Brazil) J Fonseca	6	6

Third round
(United Kingdom) H Searle	6	6
(France) A Géa	4	2
11	(Japan) R Sakamoto	3	4
8	(Brazil) J Fonseca	6	6

Quarterfinals
(United Kingdom) H Searle	7^{7}	6
8	(Brazil) J Fonseca	6^{3}	3

==== Section 2 ====
First round
4	(United States) Cooper Williams	7	6
WC	(United Kingdom) Luca Pow	5	1
(Argentina) Fernando Cavallo	3	2
(Sweden) Sebastian Eriksson	6	6
WC	(United Kingdom) Benjamin Gusic Wan	0	2
(Canada) Keegan Rice	6	6
(Italy) Gabriele Vulpitta	4	1
16	(Spain) Alejandro Melero Kretzer	6	6
10	(Austria) Joel Schwärzler	7^{7}	4	3
(United States) Roy Horovitz	6^{3}	6	6
(Norway) Nicolai Budkov Kjær	6	6
WC	(United Kingdom) Zach Stephens	1	2
(Slovenia) Matic Križnik	2	6	6
(Romania) Mihai Alexandru Coman	6	1	2
(France) Paul Barbier Gazeu	6	6^{4}	3
6	(Bulgaria) Iliyan Radulov	4	7^{7}	6

Second round
4	(United States) C Williams	6	3	6
(Sweden) S Eriksson	1	6	4
(Canada) K Rice	4	3
16	(Spain) A Melero Kretzer	6	6
(United States) R Horovitz	3	3
(Norway) N Budkov Kjær	6	6
(Slovenia) M Križnik	4	7	4
6	(Bulgaria) I Radulov	6	5	6

Third round
4	(United States) C Williams	6	6
16	(Spain) A Melero Kretzer	4	4
(Norway) N Budkov Kjær	3	2
6	(Bulgaria) I Radulov	6	6

Quarterfinals
4	(United States) C Williams	7^{7}	6
6	(Bulgaria) I Radulov	6^{4}	3

=== Bottom half ===
==== Section 3 ====
First round
7	(Serbia) Branko Djuric	1	0
(Italy) Lorenzo Sciahbasi	6	6
Q	(Venezuela) Ignacio Parisca	3	7^{7}	7
Q	(United States) Cooper Woestendick	6	6^{4}	5
WC	(United Kingdom) Viktor Frydrych	7	7^{7}
(Australia) Charlie Camus	5	6^{4}
Q	(Czech Republic) Petr Brunclík	6^{2}	1
9	(United States) Darwin Blanch	7^{7}	6
13	(Czech Republic) Maxim Mrva	2	3
(United States) Kaylan Bigun	6	6
(Sweden) Max Dahlin	6	3	4
Q	(Italy) Fabio De Michele	4	6	6
(Ukraine) Volodymyr Iakubenko	6^{5}	1
WC	(United Kingdom) Henry Jefferson	7^{7}	6
(Netherlands) Abel Forger	6^{2}	3
3	(China) Zhou Yi	7^{7}	6

Second round
(Italy) L Sciahbasi	4	6	6
Q	(Venezuela) I Parisca	6	1	4
WC	(United Kingdom) V Frydrych	7^{8}	3	3
9	(United States) Dar Blanch	6^{6}	6	6
(United States) K Bigun	7	6
Q	(Italy) F De Michele	5	3
WC	(United Kingdom) H Jefferson	6	3	6^{7}
3	(China) Y Zhou	4	6	7^{10}

Third round
(Italy) L Sciahbasi	6^{6}	3
9	(United States) Dar Blanch	7^{8}	6
(United States) K Bigun	7^{7}	6
3	(China) Y Zhou	6^{3}	4

Quarterfinals
9	(United States) Dar Blanch	7^{7}	6
(United States) K Bigun	6^{3}	3

==== Section 4 ====
First round
5	Yaroslav Demin	6	6
(Japan) Hayato Matsuoka	3	3
WC	(United Kingdom) Freddy Blaydes	6	6
(Sweden) Kevin Edengren	3	2
(Czech Republic) Jan Hrazdil	6	6
(India) Yuvan Nandal	3	2
(France) Antoine Ghibaudo	6	6
12	(Bulgaria) Adriano Dzhenev	3	2
15	(Poland) Tomasz Berkieta	6	6
WC	(United Kingdom) Phoenix Weir	4	4
(United States) Kyle Kang	6	6
Q	(Italy) Filippo Romano	2	4
(Netherlands) Mees Röttgering	6	6
(Italy) Federico Cinà	2	3
(United Kingdom) Oliver Bonding	4	4
2	(Mexico) Rodrigo Pacheco Méndez	6	6

Second round
5	Y Demin	6	6
WC	(United Kingdom) F Blaydes	3	0
(Czech Republic) J Hrazdil	4	7	6^{8}
(France) A Ghibaudo	6	5	7^{10}
15	(Poland) T Berkieta	6	6
(United States) K Kang	2	2
(Netherlands) M Röttgering	2	2
2	(Mexico) R Pacheco Méndez	6	6

Third round
5	Y Demin	6	3	6
(France) A Ghibaudo	3	6	1
15	(Poland) T Berkieta	4	7^{7}	6
2	(Mexico) R Pacheco Méndez	6	6^{2}	4

Quarterfinals
5	Y Demin	7^{7}	7^{8}
15	(Poland) T Berkieta	6^{5}	6^{6}

== Qualifying ==
=== Seeds ===
1. (Germany) Lasse Pörtner (first round)
2. (Czech Republic) Vít Kalina (qualifying competition)
3. (Czech Republic) Petr Brunclík (qualified)
4. (India) Aryan Shah (qualifying competition)
5. (South Korea) Roh Ho-young (qualifying competition)
6. (Brazil) Pedro Rodrigues (first round)
7. (Serbia) Vuk Rađenović (first round)
8. (Sweden) Albert Saar (qualifying competition)
9. (United States) Alexander Frusina (first round)
10. (Turkey) Atakan Karahan (qualifying competition)
11. (Italy) Fabio De Michele (qualified)
12. (United States) Maxwell Exsted (first round)
13. (United States) Cooper Woestendick (qualified)
14. (Brazil) Gustavo Ribeiro de Almeida (first round)
15. (Australia) Pavle Marinkov (qualified)
16. (Italy) Carlo Alberto Caniato (qualified)

=== Qualifiers ===
1. (United States) Cooper Woestendick
2. (Italy) Filippo Romano
3. (Czech Republic) Petr Brunclík
4. (Italy) Fabio De Michele
5. (Australia) Pavle Marinkov
6. (Italy) Carlo Alberto Caniato
7. (India) Manas Dhamne
8. (Venezuela) Ignacio Parisca

=== Draw ===
==== First qualifier ====
First round
1	(Germany) Lasse Pörtner	4	7^{7}	[2]
(Canada) Duncan Chan	6	6^{5}	[10]
WC	(United Kingdom) Kyle McKay	3	4
13	(United States) Cooper Woestendick	6	6

Qualifying competition
(Canada) Duncan Chan	2	4
13	(United States) Cooper Woestendick	6	6

==== Second qualifier ====
First round
2	(Czech Republic) Vít Kalina	6	0	[10]
WC	(United Kingdom) Hugo Coquelin	0	6	[8]
(Italy) Filippo Romano	6	6
9	(United States) Alexander Frusina	4	3

Qualifying competition
2	(Czech Republic) Vít Kalina	6^{3}	7^{7}	[7]
(Italy) Filippo Romano	7^{7}	6^{2}	[10]

==== Third qualifier ====
First round
3	(Czech Republic) Petr Brunclík	7^{7}	7^{7}
(Estonia) Markus Mölder	6^{4}	6^{4}
WC	(United Kingdom) Luca Bluett	6	3	[11]
14	(Brazil) Gustavo Ribeiro de Almeida	4	6	[9]

Qualifying competition
3	(Czech Republic) Petr Brunclík	6	6
WC	(United Kingdom) Luca Bluett	2	4

==== Fourth qualifier ====
First round
4	(India) Aryan Shah	5	6	[10]
(South Korea) Park Seung-min	7	2	[5]
WC	(United Kingdom) Luke Hooper	3	4
11	(Italy) Fabio De Michele	6	6

Qualifying competition
4	(India) Aryan Shah	3	3
11	(Italy) Fabio De Michele	6	6

==== Fifth qualifier ====
First round
5	(South Korea) Roh Ho-young	6	5	[10]
(Spain) Alejo Sánchez Quílez	3	7	[8]
(Brazil) Nicolas Oliveira	4	5
15	(Australia) Pavle Marinkov	6	7

Qualifying competition
5	(South Korea) Roh Ho-young	4	2
15	(Australia) Pavle Marinkov	6	6

==== Sixth qualifier ====
First round
6	(Brazil) Pedro Rodrigues	6^{8}	6^{9}
(United States) Adhithya Ganesan	7^{10}	7^{11}
WC	(United Kingdom) Jamie Diack	7^{7}	3	[6]
16	(Italy) Carlo Alberto Caniato	6^{2}	6	[10]

Qualifying competition
(United States) Adhithya Ganesan	5	5
16	(Italy) Carlo Alberto Caniato	7	7

==== Seventh qualifier ====
First round
7	(Serbia) Vuk Rađenović	3	2
(India) Manas Dhamne	6	6
(United States) Meecah Bigun	3	6	[3]
10	(Turkey) Atakan Karahan	6	3	[10]

Qualifying competition
(India) Manas Dhamne	6	6^{5}	[10]
10	(Turkey) Atakan Karahan	2	7^{7}	[8]

==== Eighth qualifier ====
First round
8	(Sweden) Albert Saar	7^{7}	6
WC	(United Kingdom) Oliver Hague	6^{3}	3
(Venezuela) Ignacio Parisca	6	6^{3}	[10]
12	(United States) Maxwell Exsted	4	7^{7}	[2]

Qualifying competition
8	(Sweden) Albert Saar	4	1
(Venezuela) Ignacio Parisca	6	6
