= 2023 Wimbledon Championships – Girls' doubles =

Girls' doubles
- 2023 Wimbledon Championships

Final
- Champions: (Czech Republic) Alena Kovačková (Czech Republic) Laura Samsonová
- Runners-up: (United Kingdom) Hannah Klugman (United Kingdom) Isabelle Lacy
- Score: 6–4, 7–5

Events
Singles	men	women		boys	girls
Doubles	men	women	mixed	boys	girls
WC Singles	men	women	quad
WC Doubles	men	women	quad
14&U Singles	boys	girls
Legends	men	women	mixed
- Wimbledon Championships

Alena Kovačková and Laura Samsonová defeated Hannah Klugman and Isabelle Lacy in the final, 6–4, 7–5 to win the girls' doubles tennis title at the 2023 Wimbledon Championships.

Rose Marie Nijkamp and Angella Okutoyi were the defending champions, but Nijkamp chose not to participate and Okutoyi was no longer eligible to participate in junior tournaments.

== Seeds ==
1. (Peru) Lucciana Pérez Alarcón / (United States) Kaitlin Quevedo (second round)
2. (Slovakia) Renáta Jamrichová / (Italy) Federica Urgesi (semifinals)
3. (Japan) Sayaka Ishii / (Japan) Ena Koike (quarterfinals)
4. (United States) Tyra Caterina Grant / (United States) Clervie Ngounoue (withdrew)
5. (Japan) Hayu Kinoshita / (Japan) Sara Saito (quarterfinals)
6. (Japan) Wakana Sonobe / (Czech Republic) Tereza Valentová (second round)
7. (Czech Republic) Nikola Bartůňková / (Slovakia) Nina Vargová (second round)
8. (United Kingdom) Ella McDonald / (Argentina) Luciana Moyano (quarterfinals)
9. (United Kingdom) Ranah Stoiber / (United Kingdom) Mingge Xu (second round)

== Draw ==
Key

- Q = Qualifier
- WC = Wild card
- LL = Lucky loser
- Alt = Alternate
- ITF = ITF entry
- PR = Protected ranking
- SR = Special ranking
- SE = Special exempt
- JE = Junior exempt
- JR = Junior Accelerator Programme entrant
- CO = College Accelerator Programme entrant
- NG = Next Gen Accelerator Program entrant
- w/o = Walkover
- r = Retired
- d = Defaulted

=== Finals ===
Semifinals
(United Kingdom) Hannah Klugman (United Kingdom) Isabelle Lacy	6	6
(United States) Tatum Evans (United States) Alanis Hamilton	2	4
(Czech Republic) Alena Kovačková (Czech Republic) Laura Samsonová	6	6
2	(Slovakia) Renáta Jamrichová (Italy) Federica Urgesi	2	4

Final
(United Kingdom) Hannah Klugman (United Kingdom) Isabelle Lacy	4	5
(Czech Republic) Alena Kovačková (Czech Republic) Laura Samsonová	6	7

=== Top half ===
First round
1	(Peru) Lucciana Pérez Alarcón (United States) Kaitlin Quevedo	7	7^{7}
(Australia) Roisin Gilheany (United Kingdom) Daniela Piani	5	6^{3}
(United States) Alexia Harmon (United States) Valeria Ray	7	3	[10]
Anastasia Grechkina (Italy) Greta Greco Lucchina	5	6	[5]
(United Kingdom) Hannah Klugman (United Kingdom) Isabelle Lacy	6	6
(Australia) Emerson Jones (Slovenia) Ela Nala Milić	4	2
(Denmark) Rebecca Munk Mortensen (United States) Theadora Rabman	2	3
7	(Czech Republic) Nikola Bartůňková (Slovakia) Nina Vargová	6	6
3	(Japan) Sayaka Ishii (Japan) Ena Koike	7	6
(Romania) Cara Maria Meșter (Germany) Sonja Zhiyenbayeva	5	1
(Bulgaria) Iva Ivanova (Poland) Malwina Rowińska	6	7
WC	(United Kingdom) Ellie Blackford (United Kingdom) Given Roach	1	5
(United States) Tatum Evans (United States) Alanis Hamilton	6	7
(Italy) Francesca Pace (Italy) Alessandra Teodosescu	3	5
Alt	Alina Korneeva (Australia) Taylah Preston	5	6	[12]
6	(Japan) Wakana Sonobe (Czech Republic) Tereza Valentová	7	2	[14]

Second round
1	(Peru) L Pérez Alarcón (United States) K Quevedo	2	2
(United States) A Harmon (United States) V Ray	6	6
(United Kingdom) H Klugman (United Kingdom) I Lacy	7^{7}	6
7	(Czech Republic) N Bartůňková (Slovakia) N Vargová	6^{1}	3
3	(Japan) S Ishii (Japan) E Koike	6	3	[10]
(Bulgaria) I Ivanova (Poland) M Rowińska	2	6	[5]
(United States) T Evans (United States) A Hamilton	6	4	[10]
6	(Japan) W Sonobe (Czech Republic) T Valentová	2	6	[7]

Quarterfinals
(United States) A Harmon (United States) V Ray	4	5
(United Kingdom) H Klugman (United Kingdom) I Lacy	6	7
3	(Japan) S Ishii (Japan) E Koike	4	6	[7]
(United States) T Evans (United States) A Hamilton	6	4	[10]

Semifinals
(United Kingdom) H Klugman (United Kingdom) I Lacy	6	6
(United States) T Evans (United States) A Hamilton	2	4

=== Bottom half ===
First round
8	(United Kingdom) Ella McDonald (Argentina) Luciana Moyano	6	6
(Bulgaria) Yoana Konstantinova (Serbia) Teodora Kostović	4	4
WC	(United Kingdom) Imogen Haddad (United Kingdom) Hannah Read	4	2
(Spain) Charo Esquiva Bañuls (Spain) Martina Genis Salas	6	6
(Czech Republic) Alena Kovačková (Czech Republic) Laura Samsonová	6	6
(Morocco) Malak El Allami (Morocco) Aya El Aouni	4	4
WC	(United Kingdom) Ruby Cooling (United Kingdom) Hannah Rylatt	6	4	[4]
9	(United Kingdom) Ranah Stoiber (United Kingdom) Mingge Xu	3	6	[10]
5	(Japan) Hayu Kinoshita (Japan) Sara Saito	6	6
(Bulgaria) Rositsa Dencheva (United States) Anya Murthy	4	3
(United States) Mia Slama (Czech Republic) Amélie Šmejkalová	5	4
WC	(United Kingdom) Hephzibah Oluwadare (United Kingdom) Mika Stojsavljevic	7	6
(Poland) Zuzanna Pawlikowska (Australia) Lily Taylor	4	6	[10]
(Serbia) Darja Surviđonkova (Czech Republic) Vendula Valdmannová	6	3	[5]
(United States) Ariana Anazagasty-Pursoo (Romania) Mara Gae	6^{4}	4
2	(Slovakia) Renáta Jamrichová (Italy) Federica Urgesi	7^{7}	6

Second round
8	(United Kingdom) E McDonald (Argentina) L Moyano	6	5	[16]
(Spain) C Esquiva Bañuls (Spain) M Genis Salas	4	7	[14]
(Czech Republic) A Kovačková (Czech Republic) L Samsonová	6	4	[10]
9	(United Kingdom) RA Stoiber (United Kingdom) M Xu	2	6	[5]
5	(Japan) H Kinoshita (Japan) S Saito	6	6
WC	(United Kingdom) H Oluwadare (United Kingdom) M Stojsavljevic	3	1
(Poland) Z Pawlikowska (Australia) L Taylor	1	6^{2}
2	(Slovakia) R Jamrichová (Italy) F Urgesi	6	7^{7}

Quarterfinals
8	(United Kingdom) E McDonald (Argentina) L Moyano	3	3
(Czech Republic) A Kovačková (Czech Republic) L Samsonová	6	6
5	(Japan) H Kinoshita (Japan) S Saito	3	6	[6]
2	(Slovakia) R Jamrichová (Italy) F Urgesi	6	4	[10]

Semifinals
(Czech Republic) A Kovačková (Czech Republic) L Samsonová	6	6
2	(Slovakia) R Jamrichová (Italy) F Urgesi	2	4
