= 2023 Wimbledon Championships – Wheelchair men's doubles =

Tennis championship

Wheelchair men's doubles
- 2023 Wimbledon Championships

Final
- Champions: (United Kingdom) Alfie Hewett (United Kingdom) Gordon Reid
- Runners-up: (Japan) Takuya Miki (Japan) Tokito Oda
- Score: 3–6, 6–0, 6–3

Details
- Draw: 4
- Seeds: 2

Events
Singles	men	women		boys	girls
Doubles	men	women	mixed	boys	girls
WC Singles	men	women	quad
WC Doubles	men	women	quad
Legends	men	women	mixed
14&U Singles	boys	girls
← 2022 ·	Wimbledon Championships	· 2024 →

Alfie Hewett and Gordon Reid defeated Takuya Miki and Tokito Oda in the final, 3–6, 6–0, 6–3 to win the gentlemen's doubles wheelchair tennis title at the 2023 Wimbledon Championships.

Gustavo Fernández and Shingo Kunieda were the reigning champions, but Kunieda retired from professional tennis in January 2023. Fernández partnered Martín de la Puente, but lost in the semifinals to Hewett and Reid.

== Seeds ==
1. (United Kingdom) Alfie Hewett / (United Kingdom) Gordon Reid (champions)
2. (Belgium) Joachim Gérard / (Netherlands) Ruben Spaargaren (semifinals)

== Draw ==
=== Key ===
- Q = Qualifier
- WC = Wild card
- LL = Lucky loser
- Alt = Alternate
- ITF = ITF entry
- PR = Protected ranking
- SR = Special ranking
- SE = Special exempt
- JE = Junior exempt
- JR = Junior Accelerator Programme entrant
- CO = College Accelerator Programme entrant
- NG = Next Gen Accelerator Program entrant
- w/o = Walkover
- r = Retired
- d = Defaulted

=== Finals ===
Semifinals
1	(United Kingdom) Alfie Hewett (United Kingdom) Gordon Reid	7	6
(Spain) Martín de la Puente (Argentina) Gustavo Fernández	5	3
(Japan) Takuya Miki (Japan) Tokito Oda	6	6
2	(Belgium) Joachim Gérard (Netherlands) Ruben Spaargaren	3	4

Final
1	(United Kingdom) Alfie Hewett (United Kingdom) Gordon Reid	3	6	6
(Japan) Takuya Miki (Japan) Tokito Oda	6	0	3

== Sources ==
- Entry List
- Draw
