= 2023 Wimbledon Championships – Ladies' invitation doubles =

Ladies' invitation doubles
- 2023 Wimbledon Championships

Final
- Champions: (Belgium) Kim Clijsters (Switzerland) Martina Hingis
- Runners-up: (Zimbabwe) Cara Black (Denmark) Caroline Wozniacki
- Score: 6–1, 7–5

Events
Singles	men	women		boys	girls
Doubles	men	women	mixed	boys	girls
WC Singles	men	women	quad
WC Doubles	men	women	quad
Legends	men	women	mixed
14&U Singles	boys	girls
← 2022 ·	Wimbledon Championships	· 2024 →

Kim Clijsters and Martina Hingis successfully defended their title, defeating Cara Black and Caroline Wozniacki in the final, 6–1, 7–5 to win the ladies' invitation doubles tennis title at the 2023 Wimbledon Championships.

== Draw ==
=== Key ===
- Q = Qualifier
- WC = Wild card
- LL = Lucky loser
- Alt = Alternate
- ITF = ITF entry
- PR = Protected ranking
- SR = Special ranking
- SE = Special exempt
- JE = Junior exempt
- JR = Junior Accelerator Programme entrant
- CO = College Accelerator Programme entrant
- NG = Next Gen Accelerator Program entrant
- w/o = Walkover
- r = Retired
- d = Defaulted

=== Final ===
Final
A1	(Zimbabwe) Cara Black (Denmark) Caroline Wozniacki	1	5
B1	(Belgium) Kim Clijsters (Switzerland) Martina Hingis	6	7

=== Group A ===
		(Zimbabwe) Black (Denmark) Wozniacki	(Slovakia) Hantuchová (United Kingdom) Robson	(United States) King (Kazakhstan) Shvedova	(China) Li (United Kingdom) O'Brien (Poland) Radwańska	RR; W–L	Set; W–L	Game; W–L	Standings
A1	(Zimbabwe) Cara Black (Denmark) Caroline Wozniacki		6–1, 1–6, [10–8]	6–4, 6–3	2–6, 6–2, [10–6] (w/ O'Brien)	3–0	6–2	29–22	1
A2	(Slovakia) Daniela Hantuchová (United Kingdom) Laura Robson	1–6, 6–1, [8–10]		0–6, 6–1, [3–10]	6–3, 6–2 (w/ Li)	1–2	4–4	25–21	3
A3	(United States) Vania King (Kazakhstan) Yaroslava Shvedova	4–6, 3–6	6–0, 1–6, [10–3]		6–1, 3–6, [10–4] (w/ Li)	2–1	4–4	25–25	2
A4	(China) Li Na (United Kingdom) Katie O'Brien (Poland) Agnieszka Radwańska	6–2, 2–6, [6–10] (w/ O'Brien)	3–6, 2–6 (w/ Li)	1–6, 6–3, [4–10] (w/ Li)		0–3	2–6	20–31	4

=== Group B ===
		(Belgium) Clijsters (Switzerland) Hingis	(United Kingdom) Konta (India) Mirza	(Germany) Petkovic (Slovakia) Rybáriková	(Italy) Schiavone (Italy) Vinci	RR; W–L	Set; W–L	Game; W–L	Standings
B1	(Belgium) Kim Clijsters (Switzerland) Martina Hingis		6–4, 6–1	6–3, 6–2	6–4, 6–3	3–0	6–0	36–17	1
B2	(United Kingdom) Johanna Konta (India) Sania Mirza	4–6, 1–6		6–3, 7–6^{(8–6)}	6–4, 7–6^{(7–2)}	2–1	4–2	31–31	2
B3	(Germany) Andrea Petkovic (Slovakia) Magdaléna Rybáriková	3–6, 2–6	3–6, 6–7^{(6–8)}		4–6, 2–6	0–3	0–6	20–37	4
B4	(Italy) Francesca Schiavone (Italy) Roberta Vinci	4–6, 3–6	4–6, 6–7^{(2–7)}	6–4, 6–2		1–2	2–4	29–31	3
