= 2023 Wimbledon Championships – Wheelchair quad singles =

Tennis championship

Wheelchair quad singles
- 2023 Wimbledon Championships

Final
- Champion: (Netherlands) Niels Vink
- Runner-up: (Australia) Heath Davidson
- Score: 6–1, 6–2

Details
- Draw: 8
- Seeds: 2

Events
| Singles | men | women | | boys | girls |
| Doubles | men | women | mixed | boys | girls |
| WC Singles | men | women | quad |
| WC Doubles | men | women | quad |
| Legends | men | women | mixed |
| 14&U Singles | boys | girls |
| ← 2022 · | Wimbledon Championships | · 2024 → |

Niels Vink defeated Heath Davidson in the final, 6–1, 6–2 to win the quad singles wheelchair tennis title at the 2023 Wimbledon Championships.

Sam Schröder was the defending champion, but lost in the semifinals to Davidson.

== Seeds ==
1. (Netherlands) Niels Vink (champion)
2. (Netherlands) Sam Schröder (semifinals)

== Draw ==
=== Key ===
- Q = Qualifier
- WC = Wild card
- LL = Lucky loser
- Alt = Alternate
- SE = Special exempt
- PR = Protected ranking
- ITF = ITF entry
- JE = Junior exempt
- w/o = Walkover
- r = Retired
- d = Defaulted
- SR = Special ranking

=== Finals ===
Quarterfinals
1 | (Netherlands) Niels Vink | 6 | 6
(United Kingdom) Andy Lapthorne | 1 | 0
(United States) David Wagner | 6 | 2 | 0
(South Africa) Donald Ramphadi | 2 | 6 | 6
WC | (United Kingdom) Gregory Slade | 2 | 4
(Australia) Heath Davidson | 6 | 6
(Canada) Robert Shaw | 1 | 3
2 | (Netherlands) Sam Schröder | 6 | 6

Semifinals
1 | (Netherlands) Niels Vink | 6 | 6
(South Africa) Donald Ramphadi | 1 | 0
(Australia) Heath Davidson | 6 | 2 | 6
2 | (Netherlands) Sam Schröder | 4 | 6 | 3

Final
1 | (Netherlands) Niels Vink | 6 | 6
(Australia) Heath Davidson | 1 | 2

== Sources ==
- Entry List
- Draw
