= 2023 Wimbledon Championships – Mixed doubles =

Mixed doubles
- 2023 Wimbledon Championships

Final
- Champions: (Croatia) Mate Pavić (Ukraine) Lyudmyla Kichenok
- Runners-up: (Belgium) Joran Vliegen (China) Xu Yifan
- Score: 6–4, 6–7^{(9–11)}, 6–3

Details
- Draw: 32
- Seeds: 8

Events
Singles	men	women		boys	girls
Doubles	men	women	mixed	boys	girls
WC Singles	men	women	quad
WC Doubles	men	women	quad
Legends	men	women	mixed
14&U Singles	boys	girls
- Wimbledon Championships

Mate Pavić and Lyudmyla Kichenok defeated Joran Vliegen and Xu Yifan in the final, 6–4, 6–7^{(9–11)}, 6–3 to win the mixed doubles tennis title at the 2023 Wimbledon Championships. Kichenok won her first major title and became the first Ukrainian champion in Wimbledon history. Pavić won his third mixed doubles major title. Both teams saved match points en route to the final: Pavić and Kichenok saved one in their second-round match against Nikola Mektić and Bernarda Pera, and Vliegen and Xu saved three in the first round against two-time defending champions Neal Skupski and Desirae Krawczyk.

== Seeds ==
1. (United States) Austin Krajicek / (United States) Jessica Pegula (withdrew)
2. (United Kingdom) Neal Skupski / (United States) Desirae Krawczyk (first round)
3. (Poland) Jan Zieliński / (United States) Nicole Melichar-Martinez (first round)
4. (Netherlands) Wesley Koolhof / (Canada) Leylah Fernandez (second round)
5. (Australia) Matthew Ebden / (Australia) Ellen Perez (quarterfinals)
6. (India) Rohan Bopanna / (Canada) Gabriela Dabrowski (first round)
7. (Croatia) Mate Pavić / (Ukraine) Lyudmyla Kichenok (champions)
8. (Netherlands) Jean-Julien Rojer / (Japan) Ena Shibahara (second round)

== Draw ==
Key

- Q = Qualifier
- WC = Wild card
- LL = Lucky loser
- Alt = Alternate
- ITF = ITF entry
- PR = Protected ranking
- SR = Special ranking
- SE = Special exempt
- JE = Junior exempt
- JR = Junior Accelerator Programme entrant
- CO = College Accelerator Programme entrant
- NG = Next Gen Accelerator Program entrant
- w/o = Walkover
- r = Retired
- d = Defaulted

=== Finals ===
Semifinals
7	(Croatia) Mate Pavić (Ukraine) Lyudmyla Kichenok	7^{8}	4	6
WC	(United Kingdom) Jonny O'Mara (United Kingdom) Olivia Nicholls	6^{6}	6	3
(Netherlands) Matwé Middelkoop (Indonesia) Aldila Sutjiadi	1	6	3
(Belgium) Joran Vliegen (China) Xu Yifan	6	3	6

Final
7	(Croatia) Mate Pavić (Ukraine) Lyudmyla Kichenok	6	6^{9}	6
(Belgium) Joran Vliegen (China) Xu Yifan	4	7^{11}	3

=== Top half ===
First round
Alt	(Argentina) A Molteni; Y Sizikova	1	4
Alt	(France) N Mahut (Kazakhstan) A Danilina	6	6
(Italy) A Vavassori; L Samsonova	5	7^{7}	6
(Brazil) R Matos (Brazil) L Stefani	7	6^{3}	2
WC	(United Kingdom) J Cash (United Kingdom) A Barnett	4	7^{7}	6^{7}
(Croatia) N Mektić (United States) B Pera	6	6^{5}	7^{10}
(Belgium) S Gillé (Japan) M Kato	3	5
7	(Croatia) M Pavić (Ukraine) L Kichenok	6	7
4	(Netherlands) W Koolhof (Canada) L Fernandez	7	7
(France) F Martin (Chinese Taipei) H-c Chan	5	5
WC	(United Kingdom) J O'Mara (United Kingdom) O Nicholls	1	7^{8}	6
(France) É Roger-Vasselin (Belgium) K Flipkens	6	6^{6}	2
WC	(Finland) E Ruusuvuori (Estonia) A Kontaveit	3	4
(Germany) K Krawietz (China) Z Yang	6	6
(Monaco) H Nys (Germany) L Siegemund	3	4
5	(Australia) M Ebden (Australia) E Perez	6	6

Second round
Alt	(France) N Mahut (Kazakhstan) A Danilina	7^{7}	4	7^{10}
(Italy) A Vavassori; L Samsonova	6^{4}	6	6^{8}
(Croatia) N Mektić (United States) B Pera	7^{7}	6^{4}	6^{9}
7	(Croatia) M Pavić (Ukraine) L Kichenok	6^{5}	7^{7}	7^{11}
4	(Netherlands) W Koolhof (Canada) L Fernandez	4	6	2
WC	(United Kingdom) J O'Mara (United Kingdom) O Nicholls	6	3	6
(Germany) K Krawietz (China) Z Yang	7^{12}	4	6^{9}
5	(Australia) M Ebden (Australia) E Perez	6^{10}	6	7^{11}

Quarterfinals
Alt	(France) N Mahut (Kazakhstan) A Danilina	3	4
7	(Croatia) M Pavić (Ukraine) L Kichenok	6	6
WC	(United Kingdom) J O'Mara (United Kingdom) O Nicholls	7	7
5	(Australia) M Ebden (Australia) E Perez	5	5

Semifinals
7	(Croatia) M Pavić (Ukraine) L Kichenok	7^{8}	4	6
WC	(United Kingdom) J O'Mara (United Kingdom) O Nicholls	6^{6}	6	3

=== Bottom half ===
First round
8	(Netherlands) J-J Rojer (Japan) E Shibahara	6	7
WC	(United Kingdom) L Glasspool (United Kingdom) J Burrage	4	5
(Netherlands) M Middelkoop (Indonesia) A Sutjiadi	6	3	7^{10}
PR	(Mexico) S González (Czech Republic) B Strýcová	4	6	6^{7}
Alt	(Australia) J Kubler (New Zealand) E Routliffe	5	2
(El Salvador) M Arévalo (Ukraine) M Kostyuk	7	6
(United Kingdom) J Murray (United States) T Townsend	7^{7}	7^{15}
3	(Poland) J Zieliński (United States) N Melichar-Martinez	6^{2}	6^{13}
6	(India) R Bopanna (Canada) G Dabrowski	7^{7}	3	4
(Croatia) I Dodig (Chinese Taipei) L Chan	6^{5}	6	6
(United States) N Lammons (Mexico) G Olmos	2	4
WC	(United Kingdom) J Salisbury (United Kingdom) H Watson	6	6
(Australia) J Peers (Australia) S Hunter	2	4
WC	(Australia) A de Minaur (United Kingdom) K Boulter	6	6
(Belgium) J Vliegen (China) Y Xu	4	7^{10}	6
2	(United Kingdom) N Skupski (United States) D Krawczyk	6	6^{8}	4

Second round
8	(Netherlands) J-J Rojer (Japan) E Shibahara	6	3	4
(Netherlands) M Middelkoop (Indonesia) A Sutjiadi	3	6	6
(El Salvador) M Arévalo (Ukraine) M Kostyuk	6	3	6
(United Kingdom) J Murray (United States) T Townsend	4	6	3
(Croatia) I Dodig (Chinese Taipei) L Chan	2	6	7^{10}
WC	(United Kingdom) J Salisbury (United Kingdom) H Watson	6	3	6^{5}
WC	(Australia) A de Minaur (United Kingdom) K Boulter	3	6	6^{2}
(Belgium) J Vliegen (China) Y Xu	6	4	7^{10}

Quarterfinals
(Netherlands) M Middelkoop (Indonesia) A Sutjiadi	7	7^{7}
(El Salvador) M Arévalo (Ukraine) M Kostyuk	5	6^{5}
(Croatia) I Dodig (Chinese Taipei) L Chan	6^{4}	2
(Belgium) J Vliegen (China) Y Xu	7^{7}	6

Semifinals
(Netherlands) M Middelkoop (Indonesia) A Sutjiadi	1	6	3
(Belgium) J Vliegen (China) Y Xu	6	3	6

== Other entry information ==
=== Wild cards ===
- (United Kingdom) Julian Cash / (United Kingdom) Alicia Barnett
- (Australia) Alex de Minaur / (United Kingdom) Katie Boulter
- (United Kingdom) Lloyd Glasspool / (United Kingdom) Jodie Burrage
- (United Kingdom) Jonny O'Mara / (United Kingdom) Olivia Nicholls
- (Finland) Emil Ruusuvuori / (Estonia) Anett Kontaveit
- (United Kingdom) Joe Salisbury / (United Kingdom) Heather Watson
- ~~(New Zealand) Michael Venus / (Canada) Bianca Andreescu~~

=== Protected ranking ===
- (Mexico) Santiago González / (Czech Republic) Barbora Strýcová

=== Alternates ===
- (Australia) Jason Kubler / (New Zealand) Erin Routliffe
- (France) Nicolas Mahut / (Kazakhstan) Anna Danilina
- (Argentina) Andrés Molteni / Yana Sizikova

=== Withdrawals ===
- (United States) Austin Krajicek / (United States) Jessica Pegula → replaced by (Argentina) Andrés Molteni / Yana Sizikova
- (Greece) Stefanos Tsitsipas / (Spain) Paula Badosa → replaced by (France) Nicolas Mahut / (Kazakhstan) Anna Danilina
- (New Zealand) Michael Venus / (Canada) Bianca Andreescu → replaced by (Australia) Jason Kubler / (New Zealand) Erin Routliffe
