= 2023 Wimbledon Championships – Wheelchair women's singles =

Tennis championship

Wheelchair women's singles
- 2023 Wimbledon Championships

Final
- Champion: (Netherlands) Diede de Groot
- Runner-up: (Netherlands) Jiske Griffioen
- Score: 6–2, 6–1

Details
- Draw: 8
- Seeds: 2

Events
Singles	men	women		boys	girls
Doubles	men	women	mixed	boys	girls
WC Singles	men	women	quad
WC Doubles	men	women	quad
Legends	men	women	mixed
14&U Singles	boys	girls
← 2022 ·	Wimbledon Championships	· 2024 →

Two-time defending champion Diede de Groot defeated Jiske Griffioen in the final, 6–2, 6–1 to win the ladies' singles wheelchair tennis title at the 2023 Wimbledon Championships. It was her eleventh consecutive major singles title.

== Seeds ==
1. (Netherlands) Diede de Groot (champion)
2. (Japan) Yui Kamiji (semifinals)

== Draw ==
=== Key ===
- Q = Qualifier
- WC = Wild card
- LL = Lucky loser
- Alt = Alternate
- ITF = ITF entry
- PR = Protected ranking
- SR = Special ranking
- SE = Special exempt
- JE = Junior exempt
- JR = Junior Accelerator Programme entrant
- CO = College Accelerator Programme entrant
- NG = Next Gen Accelerator Program entrant
- w/o = Walkover
- r = Retired
- d = Defaulted

=== Finals ===
Quarterfinals
1	(Netherlands) Diede de Groot	6	6
(South Africa) Kgothatso Montjane	3	3
(Netherlands) Aniek van Koot	2	6	6
WC	(United Kingdom) Lucy Shuker	6	1	2
(Netherlands) Jiske Griffioen	6	6
(China) Zhu Zhenzhen	4	3
(Japan) Momoko Ohtani	1	5
2	(Japan) Yui Kamiji	6	7

Semifinals
1	(Netherlands) Diede de Groot	6	6
(Netherlands) Aniek van Koot	2	0
(Netherlands) Jiske Griffioen	6	7
2	(Japan) Yui Kamiji	3	5

Final
1	(Netherlands) Diede de Groot	6	6
(Netherlands) Jiske Griffioen	2	1
