= 2023 Wimbledon Championships – Wheelchair women's doubles =

Tennis championship

Wheelchair women's doubles
- 2023 Wimbledon Championships

Final
- Champions: (Netherlands) Diede de Groot (Netherlands) Jiske Griffioen
- Runners-up: (Japan) Yui Kamiji (South Africa) Kgothatso Montjane
- Score: 6–1, 6–4

Details
- Draw: 4
- Seeds: 2

Events
Singles	men	women		boys	girls
Doubles	men	women	mixed	boys	girls
WC Singles	men	women	quad
WC Doubles	men	women	quad
Legends	men	women	mixed
14&U Singles	boys	girls
← 2022 ·	Wimbledon Championships	· 2024 →

Diede de Groot and Jiske Griffioen defeated two-time defending champion Yui Kamiji and her partner Kgothatso Montjane in the final, 6–1, 6–4 to win the ladies' doubles wheelchair tennis title at the 2023 Wimbledon Championships.

Kamiji and Dana Mathewson were the reigning champions, but Mathewson did not participate this year.

== Seeds ==
1. (Japan) Yui Kamiji / (South Africa) Kgothatso Montjane (final)
2. (Netherlands) Diede de Groot / (Netherlands) Jiske Griffioen (champions)

== Draw ==
=== Key ===
- Q = Qualifier
- WC = Wild card
- LL = Lucky loser
- Alt = Alternate
- ITF = ITF entry
- PR = Protected ranking
- SR = Special ranking
- SE = Special exempt
- JE = Junior exempt
- JR = Junior Accelerator Programme entrant
- CO = College Accelerator Programme entrant
- NG = Next Gen Accelerator Program entrant
- w/o = Walkover
- r = Retired
- d = Defaulted

=== Finals ===
Semifinals
1	(Japan) Yui Kamiji (South Africa) Kgothatso Montjane	4	6	6
(Japan) Momoko Ohtani (China) Zhu Zhenzhen	6	2	3
(United Kingdom) Lucy Shuker (Netherlands) Aniek van Koot	3	2
2	(Netherlands) Diede de Groot (Netherlands) Jiske Griffioen	6	6

Final
1	(Japan) Yui Kamiji (South Africa) Kgothatso Montjane	1	4
2	(Netherlands) Diede de Groot (Netherlands) Jiske Griffioen	6	6

== Sources ==
- Entry List
- Draw
