= 2023 Wimbledon Championships – Girls' singles =

Girls' singles
- 2023 Wimbledon Championships

Final
- Champion: (United States) Clervie Ngounoue
- Runner-up: (Czech Republic) Nikola Bartůňková
- Score: 6–2, 6–2

Events
Singles	men	women		boys	girls
Doubles	men	women	mixed	boys	girls
WC Singles	men	women	quad
WC Doubles	men	women	quad
14&U Singles	boys	girls
Legends	men	women	mixed
- Wimbledon Championships

Clervie Ngounoue won the title, defeating Nikola Bartůňková in the final, 6–2, 6–2.

Liv Hovde was the defending champion, but chose not to participate. She received a wildcard into the women's singles qualifying competition, where she lost to fifth seed Diana Shnaider in the first round.

== Seeds ==
1. Alina Korneeva (semifinals)
2. (United States) Clervie Ngounoue (champion)
3. (Japan) Sara Saito (second round)
4. (Peru) Lucciana Pérez Alarcón (second round)
5. (Slovakia) Renáta Jamrichová (semifinals)
6. (United States) Kaitlin Quevedo (second round)
7. (Japan) Sayaka Ishii (quarterfinals)
8. (Japan) Ena Koike (quarterfinals)
9. (Italy) Federica Urgesi (first round)
10. (Czech Republic) Tereza Valentová (second round)
11. (United Kingdom) Ella McDonald (second round)
12. (Slovakia) Nina Vargová (first round)
13. (Australia) Emerson Jones (third round)
14. (Serbia) Teodora Kostović (first round)
15. (United States) Tyra Caterina Grant (second round, withdrew)
16. (Spain) Charo Esquiva Banuls (second round)

Click on the seed number of a player to go to their draw section.

== Draw ==
Key

- Q = Qualifier
- WC = Wild card
- LL = Lucky loser
- Alt = Alternate
- ITF = ITF entry
- PR = Protected ranking
- SR = Special ranking
- SE = Special exempt
- JE = Junior exempt
- JR = Junior Accelerator Programme entrant
- CO = College Accelerator Programme entrant
- NG = Next Gen Accelerator Program entrant
- w/o = Walkover
- r = Retired
- d = Defaulted

=== Finals ===
Quarterfinals
1	Alina Korneeva	7	7^{7}
8	(Japan) Ena Koike	5	6^{4}
(United Kingdom) Ranah Stoiber	6	1	2
(Czech Republic) Nikola Bartůňková	1	6	6
5	(Slovakia) Renáta Jamrichová	6	6^{6}	6
WC	(United Kingdom) Mika Stojsavljevic	2	7^{8}	1
7	(Japan) Sayaka Ishii	4	5
2	(United States) Clervie Ngounoue	6	7

Semifinals
1	Alina Korneeva	4	6^{2}
(Czech Republic) Nikola Bartůňková	6	7^{7}
5	(Slovakia) Renáta Jamrichová	0	3
2	(United States) Clervie Ngounoue	6	6

Final
(Czech Republic) Nikola Bartůňková	2	2
2	(United States) Clervie Ngounoue	6	6

=== Top half ===
==== Section 1 ====
First round
1	Alina Korneeva	6	6
(Morocco) Aya El Aouni	0	2
Q	(Czech Republic) Vendula Valdmannová	1	6	7^{10}
(Bulgaria) Iva Ivanova	6	2	6^{7}
Q	(Italy) Greta Greco Lucchina	6	6
WC	(United Kingdom) Imogen Haddad	2	1
(Serbia) Darja Suvirđonkova	1	3
15	(United States) Tyra Caterina Grant	6	6
10	(Czech Republic) Tereza Valentová	6	6
WC	(United Kingdom) Hannah Read	1	2
WC	(Australia) Taylah Preston	6	7^{7}
(United States) Theadora Rabman	1	6^{2}
(Germany) Sonja Zhiyenbayeva	7^{7}	3	2
Q	(United States) Alanis Hamilton	6^{5}	6	6
WC	(United Kingdom) Gabia Paskauskas	0	1
8	(Japan) Ena Koike	6	6

Second round
1	A Korneeva	5	6	7
Q	(Czech Republic) V Valdmannová	7	3	5
Q	(Italy) G Greco Lucchina	w/o
15	(United States) TC Grant
10	(Czech Republic) T Valentová	6	3	3
(Australia) T Preston	4	6	6
Q	(United States) A Hamilton	6^{4}	7^{7}	0
8	(Japan) E Koike	7^{7}	6^{5}	6

Third round
1	A Korneeva	6	6
Q	(Italy) G Greco Lucchina	3	2
(Australia) T Preston	4	3
8	(Japan) E Koike	6	6

Quarterfinals
1	A Korneeva	7	7^{7}
8	(Japan) E Koike	5	6^{4}

==== Section 2 ====
First round
3	(Japan) Sara Saito	6	0	6
(United States) Mia Slama	1	6	4
Q	Anastasia Grechkina	3	3
(Italy) Francesca Pace	6	6
Q	(Poland) Malwina Rowińska	3	7^{7}	3
(United Kingdom) Ranah Stoiber	6	6^{5}	6
(United States) Alexia Harmon	4	1
16	(Spain) Charo Esquiva Banuls	6	6
12	(Slovakia) Nina Vargová	6	4	5
WC	(United Kingdom) Hephzibah Oluwadare	2	6	7
(Argentina) Luciana Moyano	2	0
(Czech Republic) Nikola Bartůňková	6	6
(United Kingdom) Mingge Xu	7^{8}	6
(Romania) Cara Maria Meșter	6^{6}	4
(Australia) Lily Taylor	6^{6}	3
6	(United States) Kaitlin Quevedo	7^{8}	6

Second round
3	(Japan) S Saito	6	3	4
(Italy) F Pace	3	6	6
(United Kingdom) RA Stoiber	7	6
16	(Spain) C Esquiva Banuls	5	3
WC	(United Kingdom) H Oluwadare	2	3
(Czech Republic) N Bartůňková	6	6
(United Kingdom) M Xu	7^{8}	7^{7}
6	(United States) K Quevedo	6^{6}	6^{3}

Third round
(Italy) F Pace	3	4
(United Kingdom) RA Stoiber	6	6
(Czech Republic) N Bartůňková	6	6
(United Kingdom) M Xu	3	2

Quarterfinals
(United Kingdom) RA Stoiber	6	1	2
(Czech Republic) N Bartůňková	1	6	6

=== Bottom half ===
==== Section 3 ====
First round
5	(Slovakia) Renáta Jamrichová	6	6
(Romania) Mara Gae	0	4
(United States) Ariana Anazagasty-Pursoo	6	3	6
Q	(United Kingdom) Daniela Piani	2	6	2
(Denmark) Rebecca Munk Mortensen	6	6
(Czech Republic) Alena Kovačková	2	3
(Spain) Martina Genis Salas	3	2
11	(United Kingdom) Ella McDonald	6	6
13	(Australia) Emerson Jones	6	6
WC	(United Kingdom) Given Roach	1	4
(United States) Tatum Evans	7^{7}	1	6
(Italy) Alessandra Teodosescu	6^{1}	6	2
(Japan) Wakana Sonobe	7	3	1
WC	(United Kingdom) Mika Stojsavljevic	5	6	6
(Czech Republic) Amélie Šmejkalová	4	1
4	(Peru) Lucciana Pérez Alarcón'	6	6

Second round
5	(Slovakia) R Jamrichová	6^{6}	6	7^{10}
(United States) A Anazagasty-Pursoo	7^{8}	1	6^{8}
(Denmark) R Munk Mortensen	7	6
11	(United Kingdom) E McDonald'	5	3
13	(Australia) E Jones	4	6	7
(United States) T Evans	6	1	5
WC	(United Kingdom) M Stojsavljevic	7	1	6
4	(Peru) L Pérez Alarcón	5	6	2

Third round
5	(Slovakia) R Jamrichová	6	6
(Denmark) R Munk Mortensen	3	3
13	(Australia) E Jones	1	5
WC	(United Kingdom) M Stojsavljevic	6	7

Quarterfinals
5	(Slovakia) R Jamrichová	6	6^{6}	6
WC	(United Kingdom) M Stojsavljevic	2	7^{8}	1

==== Section 4 ====
First round
7	(Japan) Sayaka Ishii	6	6
(United States) Valeria Ray	0	1
(Turkey) Melisa Ercan	4	4
(Czech Republic) Laura Samsonová	6	6
(Morocco) Malak El Allami	6	7
Q	(United States) Anya Murthy	3	5
(United Kingdom) Hannah Klugman	6	6
9	(Italy) Federica Urgesi	2	2
14	(Serbia) Teodora Kostović	0	1
(Bulgaria) Rositsa Dencheva	6	6
(Poland) Zuzanna Pawlikowska	2	5
(Slovenia) Ela Nala Milić	6	7
Q	(Australia) Roisin Gilheany	4	2
WC	(United Kingdom) Isabelle Lacy	6	6
(Japan) Hayu Kinoshita	4	4
2	(United States) Clervie Ngounoue	6	6

Second round
7	(Japan) S Ishii	6	6
(Czech Republic) L Samsonová	3	2
(Morocco) M El Allami	5	6^{2}
(United Kingdom) H Klugman	7	7^{7}
(Bulgaria) R Dencheva	6	6
(Slovenia) EN Milić	2	3
WC	(United Kingdom) I Lacy	1	1
2	(United States) C Ngounoue	6	6

Third round
7	(Japan) S Ishii	6	6
(United Kingdom) H Klugman	4	4
(Bulgaria) R Dencheva	3	1
2	(United States) C Ngounoue	6	6

Quarterfinals
7	(Japan) S Ishii	4	5
2	(United States) C Ngounoue	6	7

== Qualifying ==
=== Seeds ===
1. (Australia) Maya Joint (first round)
2. (Poland) Malwina Rowińska (qualified)
3. (Israel) Liam Oved (qualifying competition)
4. (Italy) Emma Ottavia Ghirardato (first round)
5. (Austria) Tamara Kostic (qualifying competition)
6. (Japan) Shiho Tsujioka (qualifying competition)
7. (South Korea) Kim Yu-jin (first round)
8. (United States) Alanis Hamilton (qualified)
9. (United States) Anya Murthy (qualified)
10. (Romania) Elena Ruxandra Bertea (qualifying competition)
11. (Israel) Mika Buchnik (first round)
12. (Italy) Vittoria Paganetti (qualifying competition, withdrew)
13. (Australia) Roisin Gilheany (qualified)
14. (Brazil) Olivia Carneiro (first round)
15. Anastasia Grechkina (qualified)
16. (Australia) Lily Fairclough (qualifying competition)

=== Qualifiers ===
1. (United Kingdom) Daniela Piani
2. (Poland) Malwina Rowińska
3. Anastasia Grechkina
4. (Czech Republic) Vendula Valdmannová
5. (Italy) Greta Greco Lucchina
6. (Australia) Roisin Gilheany
7. (United States) Anya Murthy
8. (United States) Alanis Hamilton

=== Draw ===
==== First qualifier ====
First round
1	(Australia) Maya Joint	4	4
(Italy) Gaia Maduzzi	6	6
WC	(United Kingdom) Daniela Piani	6	7
14	(Brazil) Olivia Carneiro	1	5

Qualifying competition
(Italy) Gaia Maduzzi	6	5	[3]
WC	(United Kingdom) Daniela Piani	4	7	[10]

==== Second qualifier ====
First round
2	(Poland) Malwina Rowińska	6	7^{7}
WC	(United Kingdom) Lois Newberry	4	6^{4}
(South Korea) Choi On-yu	6	4	[5]
12	(Italy) Vittoria Paganetti	2	6	[10]

Qualifying competition
2	(Poland) Malwina Rowińska	w/o
12	(Italy) Vittoria Paganetti

==== Third qualifier ====
First round
3	(Israel) Liam Oved	6	6
(Italy) Francesca Gandolfi	4	2
WC	(United Kingdom) Marelie Raath	6	2	[1]
15	Anastasia Grechkina	4	6	[10]

Qualifying competition
3	(Israel) Liam Oved	6	0	[9]
15	Anastasia Grechkina	4	6	[11]

==== Fourth qualifier ====
First round
4	(Italy) Emma Ottavia Ghirardato	1	0
(Czech Republic) Vendula Valdmannová	6	6
WC	(United Kingdom) Ellie Blackford	6^{5}	6	[6]
16	(Australia) Lily Fairclough	7^{7}	4	[10]

Qualifying competition
(Czech Republic) Vendula Valdmannová	6	6
16	(Australia) Lily Fairclough	4	3

==== Fifth qualifier ====
First round
5	(Austria) Tamara Kostic	6	6
(United Kingdom) Ruby Cooling	3	1
(Italy) Greta Greco Lucchina	6	6
11	(Israel) Mika Buchnik	4	2

Qualifying competition
5	(Austria) Tamara Kostic	6^{2}	6	[5]
(Italy) Greta Greco Lucchina	7^{7}	2	[10]

==== Sixth qualifier ====
First round
6	(Japan) Shiho Tsujioka	6	6
(United States) Martina Marica	0	1
(Germany) Josy Daems	3	6	[3]
13	(Australia) Roisin Gilheany	6	4	[10]

Qualifying competition
6	(Japan) Shiho Tsujioka	6	6^{4}	[6]
13	(Australia) Roisin Gilheany	2	7^{7}	[10]

==== Seventh qualifier ====
First round
7	(South Korea) Kim Yu-jin	3	6	[11]
(Romania) Carmen Andreea Herea	6	3	[13]
WC	(United Kingdom) Ciara Moore	6	4	[2]
9	(United States) Anya Murthy	4	6	[10]

Qualifying competition
(Romania) Carmen Andreea Herea	4	3
9	(United States) Anya Murthy	6	6

==== Eighth qualifier ====
First round
8	(United States) Alanis Hamilton	6	6
(Bulgaria) Yoana Konstantinova	4	4
WC	(United Kingdom) Brooke Black	4	3
10	(Romania) Elena Ruxandra Bertea	6	6

Qualifying competition
8	(United States) Alanis Hamilton	6	7
10	(Romania) Elena Ruxandra Bertea	4	5
