= 2023 Wimbledon Championships – Wheelchair men's singles =

Tennis championship

Wheelchair men's singles
- 2023 Wimbledon Championships

Final
- Champion: (Japan) Tokito Oda
- Runner-up: (United Kingdom) Alfie Hewett
- Score: 6–4, 6–2

Details
- Draw: 8
- Seeds: 2

Events
| Singles | men | women | | boys | girls |
| Doubles | men | women | mixed | boys | girls |
| WC Singles | men | women | quad |
| WC Doubles | men | women | quad |
| Legends | men | women | mixed |
| 14&U Singles | boys | girls |
| ← 2022 · | Wimbledon Championships | · 2024 → |

Tokito Oda defeated Alfie Hewett in the final, 6–4, 6–2 to win the gentlemen's singles wheelchair tennis title at the 2023 Wimbledon Championships. It was his second major singles title.

Shingo Kunieda was the reigning champion, but he retired from professional tennis in January 2023.

== Seeds ==
1. (Japan) Tokito Oda (champion)
2. (United Kingdom) Alfie Hewett (final)

== Draw ==
=== Key ===
- Q = Qualifier
- WC = Wild card
- LL = Lucky loser
- Alt = Alternate
- ITF = ITF entry
- PR = Protected ranking
- SR = Special ranking
- SE = Special exempt
- JE = Junior exempt
- JR = Junior Accelerator Programme entrant
- CO = College Accelerator Programme entrant
- NG = Next Gen Accelerator Program entrant
- w/o = Walkover
- r = Retired
- d = Defaulted

=== Finals ===
Quarterfinals
1 | (Japan) Tokito Oda | 7 | 6
(Japan) Takuya Miki | 5 | 4
(Argentina) Gustavo Fernández | 4 | 4
WC | (United Kingdom) Gordon Reid | 6 | 6
(Spain) Martín de la Puente | 6 | 6
(Netherlands) Ruben Spaargaren | 3 | 2
(Belgium) Joachim Gérard | 3 | 4
2 | (United Kingdom) Alfie Hewett | 6 | 6

Semifinals
1 | (Japan) Tokito Oda | 6 | 6
WC | (United Kingdom) Gordon Reid | 3 | 4
(Spain) Martín de la Puente | 3 | 2
2 | (United Kingdom) Alfie Hewett | 6 | 6

Final
1 | (Japan) Tokito Oda | 6 | 6
2 | (United Kingdom) Alfie Hewett | 4 | 2

== Sources ==
- Entry List
- Draw
