= 2023 Wimbledon Championships – Gentlemen's invitation doubles =

Gentlemen's invitation doubles
- 2023 Wimbledon Championships

Final
- Champions: (United States) Bob Bryan (United States) Mike Bryan
- Runners-up: (United States) James Blake (Australia) Lleyton Hewitt
- Score: 6–4, 3–6, [10–6]

Events
Singles	men	women		boys	girls
Doubles	men	women	mixed	boys	girls
WC Singles	men	women	quad
WC Doubles	men	women	quad
Legends	men	women	mixed
14&U Singles	boys	girls
← 2022 ·	Wimbledon Championships	· 2024 →

The 2023 Wimbledon Championships features the 32nd edition of the gentlemen's invitational doubles event, an exhibition event pitting former professional tennis players against one another.

Bob and Mike Bryan successfully defended their title, defeating James Blake and Lleyton Hewitt in the final, 6–4, 3–6, [10–6] to win the gentlemen's invitation doubles tennis title at the 2023 Wimbledon Championships.

== Format ==
Sixteen former professional tennis players will compete in a round-robin stage in pairs of two distributed over two groups. The winners of each group will face each other in the final.

During the group stage, André Sá was replaced by Wayne Black, while Marcos Baghdatis was replaced by Dominic Inglot.

== Draw ==
=== Key ===
- Q = Qualifier
- WC = Wild card
- LL = Lucky loser
- Alt = Alternate
- ITF = ITF entry
- PR = Protected ranking
- SR = Special ranking
- SE = Special exempt
- JE = Junior exempt
- JR = Junior Accelerator Programme entrant
- CO = College Accelerator Programme entrant
- NG = Next Gen Accelerator Program entrant
- w/o = Walkover
- r = Retired
- d = Defaulted

=== Final ===
Final
A1	(United States) Bob Bryan (United States) Mike Bryan	6	3	[10]
B2	(United States) James Blake (Australia) Lleyton Hewitt	4	6	[6]

=== Group A ===
		(United States) Bryan (United States) Bryan	(France) Grosjean (Czech Republic) Štepánek	(Germany) Haas (Australia) Philippoussis	(Brazil) Sá (Zimbabwe) Black (Brazil) Soares	RR; W–L	Set; W–L	Game; W–L	Standings
A1	(United States) Bob Bryan (United States) Mike Bryan		7–5, 6–3	6–4, 6–2	6–2, 6–3 (w/ Black)	3–0	6–0	37–19	1
A2	(France) Sébastien Grosjean (Czech Republic) Radek Štepánek	5–7, 3–6		4–6, 3–6	6–4, 6–4 (w/ Black)	1–2	2–4	27–33	3
A3	(Germany) Tommy Haas (Australia) Mark Philippoussis	4–6, 2–6	6–4, 6–3		6–3, 6–7^{(3–7)}, [8–10] (w/ Sá)	1–2	3–4	30–30	2
A4	(Brazil) André Sá (Zimbabwe) Wayne Black (Brazil) Bruno Soares	2–6, 3–6 (w/ Black)	4–6, 4–6 (w/ Black)	3–6, 7–6^{(7–3)}, [10–8] (w/ Sá)		1–2	2–5	24–36	4

=== Group B ===
		(Cyprus) Baghdatis (United Kingdom) Inglot (Belgium) Malisse	(United States) Blake (Australia) Hewitt	(United Kingdom) Delgado (United Kingdom) Marray	(Austria) Melzer (Luxembourg) Müller	RR; W–L	Set; W–L	Game; W–L	Standings
B1	(Cyprus) Marcos Baghdatis (United Kingdom) Dominic Inglot (Belgium) Xavier Malisse		3–6, 4–6 (w/ Baghdatis)	3–6, 6–3, [10–12] (w/ Baghdatis)	7–5, 3–6, [8–10] (w/ Inglot)	0–3	2–6	26–34	4
B2	(United States) James Blake (Australia) Lleyton Hewitt	6–3, 6–4 (w/ Baghdatis)		6–3, 6–4	6–3, 4–6, [10–6]	3–0	6–1	35–23	1
B3	(United Kingdom) Jamie Delgado (United Kingdom) Jonathan Marray	6–3, 3–6, [12–10] (w/ Baghdatis)	3–6, 4–6		4–6, 6–7^{(3–7)}	1–2	2–5	27–34	3
B4	(Austria) Jürgen Melzer (Luxembourg) Gilles Müller	5–7, 6–3, [10–8] (w/ Inglot)	3–6, 6–4, [6–10]	6–4, 7–6^{(7–3)}		2–1	5–3	34–31	2
