= 2023 Wimbledon Championships – Wheelchair quad doubles =

Wheelchair quad doubles
- 2023 Wimbledon Championships

Final
- Champions: (Netherlands) Sam Schröder (Netherlands) Niels Vink
- Runners-up: (Australia) Heath Davidson (Canada) Robert Shaw
- Score: 7–6^{(7–5)}, 6–0

Details
- Draw: 4
- Seeds: 2

Events
| Singles | men | women | | boys | girls |
| Doubles | men | women | mixed | boys | girls |
| WC Singles | men | women | quad |
| WC Doubles | men | women | quad |
| Legends | men | women | mixed |
| 14&U Singles | boys | girls |
| ← 2022 · | Wimbledon Championships | · 2024 → |

Defending champions Sam Schröder and Niels Vink defeated Heath Davidson and Robert Shaw in the final, 7–6^{(7–5)}, 6–0 to win the quad doubles wheelchair tennis title at the 2023 Wimbledon Championships.

== Seeds ==
1. (Netherlands) Sam Schröder / (Netherlands) Niels Vink (champions)
2. (Australia) Heath Davidson / (Canada) Robert Shaw (final)

== Draw ==
=== Key ===
- Q = Qualifier
- WC = Wild card
- LL = Lucky loser
- Alt = Alternate
- SE = Special exempt
- PR = Protected ranking
- ITF = ITF entry
- JE = Junior exempt
- w/o = Walkover
- r = Retired
- d = Defaulted
- SR = Special ranking

=== Finals ===
Semifinals
1 | (Netherlands) Sam Schröder (Netherlands) Niels Vink | 6 | 6
(United Kingdom) Andy Lapthorne (South Africa) Donald Ramphadi | 0 | 3
(United Kingdom) Gregory Slade (United States) David Wagner | 6^{4} | 2
2 | (Australia) Heath Davidson (Canada) Robert Shaw | 7^{7} | 6

Final
1 | (Netherlands) Sam Schröder (Netherlands) Niels Vink | 7^{7} | 6
2 | (Australia) Heath Davidson (Canada) Robert Shaw | 6^{5} | 0

== Sources ==
- Entry List
- Draw
