= 2026 Australian Open – Women's singles qualifying =

Women's singles qualifying
- 2026 Australian Open

Events
Singles	men	women		boys	girls
Doubles	men	women	mixed	boys	girls
WC Singles	men	women	quad	boys	girls
WC Doubles	men	women	quad	boys	girls

Qualification
Singles	men	women
- Australian Open

The 2026 Australian Open – Women's singles qualifying is a series of tennis matches that took place from 12 to 15 January 2026 to determine the sixteen qualifiers into the main draw of the women's singles tournament.

This was the first time 2017 US Open champion Sloane Stephens contested the qualifying competition of a major since the 2011 Wimbledon Championships.

Only 16 out of the 128 qualifiers who compete in this knock-out tournament, secure a main draw place. The match between Elvina Kalieva and Guiomar Maristany, was the longest final qualifying contest, lasting 2 hours and 57 minutes.

== Seeds ==
All seeds are per WTA rankings as of 5 January 2026. The entry list was based on the WTA rankings for the week of 22 December 2025.

1. Anastasia Zakharova (moved to main draw)
2. (Italy) Lucia Bronzetti (qualifying competition)
3. (Egypt) Mayar Sherif (first round)
4. (Austria) Sinja Kraus (first round)
5. (Turkey) Zeynep Sönmez (qualified)
6. (Ukraine) Yuliia Starodubtseva (qualified)
7. (United Kingdom) Katie Boulter (moved to main draw)
8. Aliaksandra Sasnovich (qualified)
9. (Andorra) Victoria Jiménez Kasintseva (second round)
10. (Switzerland) Rebeka Masarova (second round)
11. (United States) Taylor Townsend (qualifying competition, lucky loser)
12. (Belgium) Greet Minnen (qualifying competition)
13. (France) Diane Parry (first round)
14. (Germany) Tamara Korpatsch (qualifying competition)
15. (Belgium) Hanne Vandewinkel (first round)
16. (Czech Republic) Nikola Bartůňková (qualified)
17. (Canada) Marina Stakusic (qualified)
18. (Bulgaria) Viktoriya Tomova (qualifying competition)
19. (Chinese Taipei) Joanna Garland (first round)
20. (Czech Republic) Linda Fruhvirtová (qualified)
21. (Thailand) Lanlana Tararudee (qualified)
22. (Netherlands) Arantxa Rus (first round)
23. (Poland) Linda Klimovičová (qualified)
24. (Poland) Katarzyna Kawa (first round)
25. (China) Yuan Yue (qualified)
26. (Italy) Lucrezia Stefanini (second round)
27. (Serbia) Lola Radivojević (second round)
28. (Uzbekistan) Maria Timofeeva (first round)
29. (Spain) Leyre Romero Gormaz (first round)
30. (Spain) Kaitlin Quevedo (first round)
31. (Czech Republic) Dominika Šalková (second round)
32. (United States) Varvara Lepchenko (first round)

== Qualifiers ==
1. (China) Bai Zhuoxuan
2. (United States) Sloane Stephens
3. (Spain) Guiomar Maristany
4. (China) Yuan Yue
5. (Turkey) Zeynep Sönmez
6. (Ukraine) Yuliia Starodubtseva
7. (Japan) Himeno Sakatsume
8. Aliaksandra Sasnovich
9. (Canada) Marina Stakusic
10. (Ukraine) Anhelina Kalinina
11. (Australia) Storm Hunter
12. (Poland) Linda Klimovičová
13. (Thailand) Lanlana Tararudee
14. (Australia) Maddison Inglis
15. (Czech Republic) Linda Fruhvirtová
16. (Czech Republic) Nikola Bartůňková

== Lucky loser ==
1. (United States) Taylor Townsend

== Draw ==
Key

- Q = Qualifier
- WC = Wild card
- LL = Lucky loser
- Alt = Alternate
- ITF = ITF entry
- PR = Protected ranking
- SR = Special ranking
- SE = Special exempt
- JE = Junior exempt
- JR = Junior Accelerator Programme entrant
- CO = College Accelerator Programme entrant
- NG = Next Gen Accelerator Program entrant
- w/o = Walkover
- r = Retired
- d = Defaulted

=== First qualifier ===
First round
Alt	(France) Chloé Paquet	6	6^{3}	6
PR	(France) Kristina Mladenovic	2	7^{7}	3
PR	(China) Bai Zhuoxuan	6	6
Alina Korneeva	4	3
(Czech Republic) Darja Vidmanova	6	2	6
(United Kingdom) Mimi Xu	3	6	2
(China) Guo Hanyu	5	1
31	(Czech Republic) Dominika Šalková	7	6

Second round
Alt	(France) Chloé Paquet	1	2
PR	(China) Bai Zhuoxuan	6	6
(Czech Republic) Darja Vidmanova	7^{7}	6
31	(Czech Republic) Dominika Šalková	6^{2}	0

Qualifying competition
PR	(China) Bai Zhuoxuan	4	6	6
(Czech Republic) Darja Vidmanova	6	4	1

=== Second qualifier ===
First round
2	(Italy) Lucia Bronzetti	6	6^{3}	6
(Spain) Aliona Bolsova	0	7^{7}	1
(Italy) Nuria Brancaccio	5	6	5
(United States) Mary Stoiana	7	4	7
PR	(United States) Sloane Stephens	6	7
(Czech Republic) Barbora Palicová	1	5
(Australia) Olivia Gadecki	6	6
22	(Netherlands) Arantxa Rus	2	4

Second round
2	(Italy) Lucia Bronzetti	7^{9}	1	6
(United States) Mary Stoiana	6^{7}	6	4
PR	(United States) Sloane Stephens	3	6	6
(Australia) Olivia Gadecki	6	3	3

Qualifying competition
2	(Italy) Lucia Bronzetti	1	5
PR	(United States) Sloane Stephens	6	7

=== Third qualifier ===
First round
3	(Egypt) Mayar Sherif	4	3
(Spain) Guiomar Maristany	6	6
(Spain) Andrea Lázaro García	2	4
Tatiana Prozorova	6	6
(China) Wei Sijia	6	2	2^{r}
(United States) Elvina Kalieva	4	6	3
(China) Ma Yexin	6	6
32	(United States) Varvara Lepchenko	1	3

Second round
(Spain) Guiomar Maristany	6	2	7^{10}
Tatiana Prozorova	2	6	6^{7}
(United States) Elvina Kalieva	6	6
(China) Ma Yexin	4	2

Qualifying competition
(Spain) Guiomar Maristany	7	4	6
(United States) Elvina Kalieva	5	6	4

=== Fourth qualifier ===
First round
4	(Austria) Sinja Kraus	5	0
(North Macedonia) Lina Gjorcheska	7	6
(Slovenia) Tamara Zidanšek	7^{7}	6
(France) Jessika Ponchet	6^{3}	3
Polina Iatcenko	3	3
(Argentina) María Lourdes Carlé	6	6
(United States) Louisa Chirico	6	1	2
25	(China) Yuan Yue	3	6	6

Second round
(North Macedonia) Lina Gjorcheska	6	2	5
(Slovenia) Tamara Zidanšek	4	6	7
(Argentina) María Lourdes Carlé	6^{5}	6	4
25	(China) Yuan Yue	7^{7}	3	6

Qualifying competition
(Slovenia) Tamara Zidanšek	3	1
25	(China) Yuan Yue	6	6

=== Fifth qualifier ===
First round
5	(Turkey) Zeynep Sönmez	6	6
(Czech Republic) Laura Samson	2	2
(Argentina) Julia Riera	6	1	6
(Japan) Ena Shibahara	4	6	3
(Italy) Camilla Rosatello	3	2
(Lithuania) Justina Mikulskytė	6	6
Anastasia Gasanova	7^{7}	6
30	(Spain) Kaitlin Quevedo	6^{3}	3

Second round
5	(Turkey) Zeynep Sönmez	6	6
(Argentina) Julia Riera	3	1
(Lithuania) Justina Mikulskytė	7^{7}	2	0
Anastasia Gasanova	6^{4}	6	6

Qualifying competition
5	(Turkey) Zeynep Sönmez	6	6
Anastasia Gasanova	3	2

=== Sixth qualifier ===
First round
6	(Ukraine) Yuliia Starodubtseva	6	3	6
PR	(France) Alice Tubello	2	6	0
(Greece) Despina Papamichail	6	7
PR	(United States) Sachia Vickery	3	5
(Slovakia) Viktória Hrunčáková	6	6
(Burundi) Sada Nahimana	3	1
(United States) Bernarda Pera	6	4	0
18	(Bulgaria) Viktoriya Tomova	1	6	6

Second round
6	(Ukraine) Yuliia Starodubtseva	6	6
(Greece) Despina Papamichail	1	2
(Slovakia) Viktória Hrunčáková	4	4
18	(Bulgaria) Viktoriya Tomova	6	6

Qualifying competition
6	(Ukraine) Yuliia Starodubtseva	7^{7}	6
18	(Bulgaria) Viktoriya Tomova	6^{3}	2

=== Seventh qualifier ===
First round
Alt	(Spain) Marina Bassols Ribera	6	7^{7}
(Argentina) Luisina Giovannini	2	6^{4}
Iryna Shymanovich	7^{7}	5	6
(Australia) Arina Rodionova	6^{4}	7	4
(France) Manon Léonard	2	1
(Japan) Himeno Sakatsume	6	6
(Japan) Mai Hontama	1	6	7
28	(Uzbekistan) Maria Timofeeva	6	4	5

Second round
Alt	(Spain) Marina Bassols Ribera	7	6
Iryna Shymanovich	5	1
(Japan) Himeno Sakatsume	6	6
(Japan) Mai Hontama	4	2

Qualifying competition
Alt	(Spain) Marina Bassols Ribera	6	6^{3}	4
(Japan) Himeno Sakatsume	4	7^{7}	6

=== Eighth qualifier ===
First round
8	Aliaksandra Sasnovich	6	6
WC	(France) Ksenia Efremova	3	1
(Liechtenstein) Kathinka von Deichmann	3	7	6
WC	(Australia) Renee Alame	6	5	1
(Australia) Astra Sharma	6^{3}	6	3
(Canada) Carson Branstine	7^{7}	2	6
(Ukraine) Daria Snigur	6	2	6
24	(Poland) Katarzyna Kawa	1	6	2

Second round
8	Aliaksandra Sasnovich	6	7^{7}
(Liechtenstein) Kathinka von Deichmann	3	6^{4}
(Canada) Carson Branstine	4	2^{r}
(Ukraine) Daria Snigur	6	4

Qualifying competition
8	Aliaksandra Sasnovich	6	0	6
(Ukraine) Daria Snigur	2	6	2

=== Ninth qualifier ===
First round
9	(Andorra) Victoria Jiménez Kasintseva	4	6	7
(Canada) Kayla Cross	6	4	5
(Brazil) Laura Pigossi	4	4
(China) Zhu Lin	6	6
PR	(Croatia) Tereza Mrdeža	0	3
(Serbia) Teodora Kostović	6	6
(Spain) Nuria Párrizas Díaz	3	2
17	(Canada) Marina Stakusic	6	6

Second round
9	(Andorra) Victoria Jiménez Kasintseva	1	2
(China) Zhu Lin	6	6
(Serbia) Teodora Kostović	0	2
17	(Canada) Marina Stakusic	6	6

Qualifying competition
(China) Zhu Lin	5	4
17	(Canada) Marina Stakusic	7	6

=== Tenth qualifier ===
First round
10	(Switzerland) Rebeka Masarova	6	6^{2}	7^{10}
Alina Charaeva	3	7^{7}	6^{5}
(Poland) Maja Chwalińska	7^{7}	6
PR	(United States) Madison Brengle	6^{3}	3
WC	(Australia) Tahlia Kokkinis	3	3
(Netherlands) Anouk Koevermans	6	6
(Ukraine) Anhelina Kalinina	7	6
19	(Chinese Taipei) Joanna Garland	5	2

Second round
10	(Switzerland) Rebeka Masarova	6^{8}	7	1
(Poland) Maja Chwalińska	7^{10}	5	6
(Netherlands) Anouk Koevermans	6^{6}	0
(Ukraine) Anhelina Kalinina	7^{8}	6

Qualifying competition
(Poland) Maja Chwalińska	7	2	1
(Ukraine) Anhelina Kalinina	5	6	6

=== Eleventh qualifier ===
First round
11	(United States) Taylor Townsend	6^{3}	6	7
(Japan) Nao Hibino	7^{7}	0	5
(France) Alice Ramé	7	3	4
(Argentina) Jazmín Ortenzi	5	6	6
WC	(Australia) Storm Hunter	7	6
(Georgia (country)) Ekaterine Gorgodze	5	3
WC	(Australia) Alana Subasic	6	1	4
27	(Serbia) Lola Radivojević	3	6	6

Second round
11	(United States) Taylor Townsend	6	6
(Argentina) Jazmín Ortenzi	4	4
WC	(Australia) Storm Hunter	6	7^{7}
27	(Serbia) Lola Radivojević	4	6^{1}

Qualifying competition
11	(United States) Taylor Townsend	6^{6}	2
WC	(Australia) Storm Hunter	7^{8}	6

=== Twelfth qualifier ===
First round
12	(Belgium) Greet Minnen	6	6
(Portugal) Francisca Jorge	2	3
(Italy) Jessica Pieri	6^{4}	6	4
(France) Harmony Tan	7^{7}	2	6
(Czech Republic) Gabriela Knutson	5	0
WC	(Australia) Lizette Cabrera	7	6
WC	(Australia) Stefani Webb	2	1
23	(Poland) Linda Klimovičová	6	6

Second round
12	(Belgium) Greet Minnen	7^{7}	6
(France) Harmony Tan	6^{3}	3
WC	(Australia) Lizette Cabrera	4	5
23	(Poland) Linda Klimovičová	6	7

Qualifying competition
12	(Belgium) Greet Minnen	4	4
23	(Poland) Linda Klimovičová	6	6

=== Thirteenth qualifier ===
First round
13	(France) Diane Parry	3	2
Elena Pridankina	6	6
(Austria) Lilli Tagger	3	7	6
(China) Gao Xinyu	6	5	3
(Australia) Destanee Aiava	3	6	3
(United Kingdom) Harriet Dart	6	2	6
(Belgium) Sofia Costoulas	4	3
21	(Thailand) Lanlana Tararudee	6	6

Second round
Elena Pridankina	7^{7}	6^{5}	1
(Austria) Lilli Tagger	6^{5}	7^{7}	6
(United Kingdom) Harriet Dart	0	6	3
21	(Thailand) Lanlana Tararudee	6	3	6

Qualifying competition
(Austria) Lilli Tagger	3	0
21	(Thailand) Lanlana Tararudee	6	6

=== Fourteenth qualifier ===
First round
14	(Germany) Tamara Korpatsch	6	6^{7}	6
(Romania) Miriam Bulgaru	4	7^{9}	2
(Italy) Silvia Ambrosio	6	6
(Mexico) Ana Sofía Sánchez	1	2
(Croatia) Tara Würth	3	4
(United States) Claire Liu	6	6
(Australia) Maddison Inglis	4	7^{7}	6
29	(Spain) Leyre Romero Gormaz	6	6^{4}	2

Second round
14	(Germany) Tamara Korpatsch	6	2
(Italy) Silvia Ambrosio	3	0^{r}
(United States) Claire Liu	6^{6}	6	4
(Australia) Maddison Inglis	7^{8}	2	6

Qualifying competition
14	(Germany) Tamara Korpatsch	4	4
(Australia) Maddison Inglis	6	6

=== Fifteenth qualifier ===
First round
15	(Belgium) Hanne Vandewinkel	6	3	4
(United States) Carol Young Suh Lee	3	6	6
(France) Carole Monnet	4	6	1
WC	(Australia) Elena Micic	6	4	6
PR	(France) Fiona Ferro	6	6
(South Korea) Ku Yeon-woo	3	2
(Germany) Anna-Lena Friedsam	6	2	3
20	(Czech Republic) Linda Fruhvirtová	2	6	6

Second round
(United States) Carol Young Suh Lee	6	6
WC	(Australia) Elena Micic	2	2
PR	(France) Fiona Ferro	4	6	4
20	(Czech Republic) Linda Fruhvirtová	6	3	6

Qualifying competition
(United States) Carol Young Suh Lee	7	2	4
20	(Czech Republic) Linda Fruhvirtová	5	6	6

=== Sixteenth qualifier ===
First round
16	(Czech Republic) Nikola Bartůňková	6	6
(France) Séléna Janicijevic	3	3
WC	(Australia) Tina Smith	7^{7}	7^{8}
(Canada) Cadence Brace	6^{5}	6^{6}
(Latvia) Anastasija Sevastova	2	0
(United States) Whitney Osuigwe	6	6
(Netherlands) Eva Vedder	4	2
26	(Italy) Lucrezia Stefanini	6	6

Second round
16	(Czech Republic) Nikola Bartůňková	1	5
WC	(Australia) Tina Smith	6	2^{r}
(United States) Whitney Osuigwe	7	6
26	(Italy) Lucrezia Stefanini	5	2

Qualifying competition
16	(Czech Republic) Nikola Bartůňková	6	6
(United States) Whitney Osuigwe	1	0
