= 2026 Australian Open – Men's singles qualifying =

Men's singles qualifying
- 2026 Australian Open

Events
Singles	men	women		boys	girls
Doubles	men	women	mixed	boys	girls
WC Singles	men	women	quad	boys	girls
WC Doubles	men	women	quad	boys	girls

Qualification
Singles	men	women
- Australian Open

The 2026 Australian Open – Men's singles qualifying is a series of tennis matches that took place from 12 to 15 January 2026 to determine the sixteen qualifiers into the main draw of the men's singles tournament.

Only 16 out of the 128 qualifiers who compete in this knock-out tournament, secure a main draw place.

== Seeds ==
All seeds are per ATP rankings as of 5 January 2026. The entry list was based on the ATP rankings for the week of 17 November 2025, rather than the usual cutoff date of 22 December 2025.

1. (Germany) Yannick Hanfmann (moved to main draw)
2. (Argentina) Román Andrés Burruchaga (second round)
3. (Georgia (country)) Nikoloz Basilashvili (first round)
4. (Chile) Tomás Barrios Vera (second round)
5. (United States) Brandon Holt (second round)
6. (United States) Mackenzie McDonald (qualifying competition, lucky loser)
7. (Belgium) Alexander Blockx (qualifying competition, retired, lucky loser)
8. (Japan) Yoshihito Nishioka (second round, retired)
9. (Denmark) Elmer Møller (second round)
10. (Chinese Taipei) Tseng Chun-hsin (first round)
11. (United Kingdom) Jan Choinski (first round)
12. (Finland) Otto Virtanen (first round)
13. (Serbia) Dušan Lajović (qualifying competition)
14. (Croatia) Dino Prižmić (qualifying competition, lucky loser)
15. (United Kingdom) Billy Harris (first round)
16. (Spain) Roberto Carballés Baena (second round)
17. (Lithuania) Vilius Gaubas (second round)
18. (Argentina) Marco Trungelliti (qualifying competition)
19. (Austria) Sebastian Ofner (second round)
20. (Canada) Liam Draxl (qualified)
21. (Chile) Nicolás Jarry (first round)
22. (Tunisia) Moez Echargui (first round)
23. (Norway) Nicolai Budkov Kjær (qualified)
24. (Italy) Francesco Maestrelli (qualified)
25. (Bolivia) Hugo Dellien (first round)
26. (Italy) Andrea Pellegrino (first round)
27. (Italy) Francesco Passaro (second round)
28. (Slovakia) Lukáš Klein (qualifying competition)
29. (United States) Zachary Svajda (qualified)
30. (Paraguay) Daniel Vallejo (qualifying competition)
31. (France) Ugo Blanchet (first round)
32. (United States) Colton Smith (second round)

== Qualifiers ==
1. (Portugal) Jaime Faria
2. (France) Arthur Géa
3. (Norway) Nicolai Budkov Kjær
4. (United States) Michael Zheng
5. (Japan) Rei Sakamoto
6. (Canada) Liam Draxl
7. (Australia) Jason Kubler
8. (United States) Nishesh Basavareddy
9. (Sweden) Elias Ymer
10. (Australia) Dane Sweeny
11. (United States) Zachary Svajda
12. (China) Wu Yibing
13. (Italy) Francesco Maestrelli
14. (United Kingdom) Arthur Fery
15. (Spain) Rafael Jódar
16. (United States) Martin Damm

== Lucky losers ==
1. (Croatia) Dino Prižmić
2. (Belgium) Alexander Blockx
3. (United States) Mackenzie McDonald

== Draw ==
Key

- Q = Qualifier
- WC = Wild card
- LL = Lucky loser
- Alt = Alternate
- ITF = ITF entry
- PR = Protected ranking
- SR = Special ranking
- SE = Special exempt
- JE = Junior exempt
- JR = Junior Accelerator Programme entrant
- CO = College Accelerator Programme entrant
- NG = Next Gen Accelerator Program entrant
- w/o = Walkover
- r = Retired
- d = Defaulted

=== First qualifier ===
First round
Alt	(Croatia) Matej Dodig	7	3	2
(Lebanon) Benjamin Hassan	5	6	6
(Portugal) Jaime Faria	7^{7}	7
(Croatia) Luka Mikrut	6^{2}	5
(Brazil) João Lucas Reis da Silva	2	4
(Portugal) Henrique Rocha	6	6
WC	(Australia) Philip Sekulic	2	6	1
18	(Argentina) Marco Trungelliti	6	1	6

Second round
(Lebanon) Benjamin Hassan	3	4
(Portugal) Jaime Faria	6	6
(Portugal) Henrique Rocha	5	6	3
18	(Argentina) Marco Trungelliti	7	4	6

Qualifying competition
(Portugal) Jaime Faria	7^{7}	6
18	(Argentina) Marco Trungelliti	6^{5}	3

=== Second qualifier ===
First round
2	(Argentina) Román Andrés Burruchaga	6	6
(United Kingdom) Ryan Peniston	1	1
(Czech Republic) Zdeněk Kolář	2	3
(France) Arthur Géa	6	6
(South Africa) Lloyd Harris	4	7^{7}	3
(Italy) Federico Cinà	6	6^{4}	6
(Mexico) Rodrigo Pacheco Méndez	1	2
30	(Paraguay) Daniel Vallejo	6	6

Second round
2	(Argentina) Román Andrés Burruchaga	2	3
(France) Arthur Géa	6	6
(Italy) Federico Cinà	6	2	3
30	(Paraguay) Daniel Vallejo	4	6	6

Qualifying competition
(France) Arthur Géa	6	6
30	(Paraguay) Daniel Vallejo	2	2

=== Third qualifier ===
First round
3	(Georgia (country)) Nikoloz Basilashvili	1	6^{5}
(Peru) Gonzalo Bueno	6	7^{7}
(France) Pierre-Hugues Herbert	3	6	6
(Netherlands) Guy den Ouden	6	3	2
WC	(Australia) Pavle Marinkov	2	6^{5}
(Australia) James McCabe	6	7^{7}
(Japan) Yosuke Watanuki	7^{7}	5	4
23	(Norway) Nicolai Budkov Kjær	6^{5}	7	6

Second round
(Peru) Gonzalo Bueno	5	2
(France) Pierre-Hugues Herbert	7	6
(Australia) James McCabe	6	3	6^{6}
23	(Norway) Nicolai Budkov Kjær	4	6	7^{10}

Qualifying competition
(France) Pierre-Hugues Herbert	2	3
23	(Norway) Nicolai Budkov Kjær	6	6

=== Fourth qualifier ===
First round
4	(Chile) Tomás Barrios Vera	6	7^{8}
(France) Sascha Gueymard Wayenburg	2	6^{6}
WC	(Australia) Cruz Hewitt	3	3
(United States) Michael Zheng	6	6
(United Kingdom) Oliver Crawford	3	6	3
(Spain) Daniel Mérida	6	2	6
(Hungary) Zsombor Piros	4	4
28	(Slovakia) Lukáš Klein	6	6

Second round
4	(Chile) Tomás Barrios Vera	4	7^{7}	2
(United States) Michael Zheng	6	6^{4}	6
(Spain) Daniel Mérida	3	7^{7}	4
28	(Slovakia) Lukáš Klein	6	6^{2}	6

Qualifying competition
(United States) Michael Zheng	4	6	7^{12}
28	(Slovakia) Lukáš Klein	6	3	6^{10}

=== Fifth qualifier ===
First round
5	(United States) Brandon Holt	4	6	6
(Austria) Lukas Neumayer	6	2	3
(Italy) Giulio Zeppieri	6	6
(France) Dan Added	3	3
(Japan) Rei Sakamoto	6	6
(United Kingdom) Dan Evans	1	2
(France) Luka Pavlovic	6^{4}	1
32	(United States) Colton Smith	7^{7}	6

Second round
5	(United States) Brandon Holt	7^{7}	5	4
(Italy) Giulio Zeppieri	6^{4}	7	6
(Japan) Rei Sakamoto	6	6
32	(United States) Colton Smith	4	4

Qualifying competition
(Italy) Giulio Zeppieri	2	2
(Japan) Rei Sakamoto	6	6

=== Sixth qualifier ===
First round
6	(United States) Mackenzie McDonald	6^{4}	6	7
(Kazakhstan) Dmitry Popko	7^{7}	4	5
(Colombia) Daniel Elahi Galán	6^{9}	0^{r}
(France) Hugo Grenier	7^{11}	1
(Ukraine) Vitaliy Sachko	6	7^{7}
Alt	(Norway) Viktor Durasovic	3	6^{1}
WC	(Australia) Moerani Bouzige	6^{3}	3
20	(Canada) Liam Draxl	7^{7}	6

Second round
6	(United States) Mackenzie McDonald	7^{7}	6
(France) Hugo Grenier	6^{4}	1
(Ukraine) Vitaliy Sachko	3	7	6^{7}
20	(Canada) Liam Draxl	6	5	7^{10}

Qualifying competition
6	(United States) Mackenzie McDonald	6	6^{2}	2
20	(Canada) Liam Draxl	3	7^{7}	6

=== Seventh qualifier ===
First round
7	(Belgium) Alexander Blockx	6	6
(Italy) Marco Cecchinato	3	4
(Japan) Sho Shimabukuro	4	6	3
(Slovakia) Alex Molčan	6	4	6
(Australia) Jason Kubler	6	6
(France) Harold Mayot	3	4
PR	(United States) Nicolas Moreno de Alboran	5	3
17	(Lithuania) Vilius Gaubas	7	6

Second round
7	(Belgium) Alexander Blockx	6	6
(Slovakia) Alex Molčan	1	1
(Australia) Jason Kubler	7	6
17	(Lithuania) Vilius Gaubas	5	2

Qualifying competition
7	(Belgium) Alexander Blockx	6	3	0^{r}
(Australia) Jason Kubler	3	6	1

=== Eighth qualifier ===
First round
8	(Japan) Yoshihito Nishioka	6	6
(Bosnia and Herzegovina) Nerman Fatić	1	2
(Germany) Justin Engel	6^{4}	6^{2}
(United Kingdom) George Loffhagen	7^{7}	7^{7}
(Canada) Alexis Galarneau	4	2
(United States) Nishesh Basavareddy	6	6
(Denmark) August Holmgren	4	4
19	(Austria) Sebastian Ofner	6	6

Second round
8	(Japan) Yoshihito Nishioka	3	1^{r}
(United Kingdom) George Loffhagen	6	3
(United States) Nishesh Basavareddy	4	6	7^{13}
19	(Austria) Sebastian Ofner	6	4	6^{11}

Qualifying competition
(United Kingdom) George Loffhagen	7	4	4
(United States) Nishesh Basavareddy	5	6	6

=== Ninth qualifier ===
First round
9	(Denmark) Elmer Møller	6	7^{8}
WC	(Australia) Marc Polmans	4	6^{6}
(Australia) Alex Bolt	6^{4}	6^{5}
(Sweden) Elias Ymer	7^{7}	7^{7}
(Spain) Pablo Llamas Ruiz	3	6	7^{10}
WC	(Switzerland) Henry Bernet	6	3	6^{3}
(Hong Kong) Coleman Wong	6	7^{8}
31	(France) Ugo Blanchet	3	6^{6}

Second round
9	(Denmark) Elmer Møller	6	4	5
(Sweden) Elias Ymer	4	6	7
(Spain) Pablo Llamas Ruiz	6^{7}	0
(Hong Kong) Coleman Wong	7^{9}	6

Qualifying competition
(Sweden) Elias Ymer	7^{7}	4	6
(Hong Kong) Coleman Wong	6^{4}	6	3

=== Tenth qualifier ===
First round
10	(Chinese Taipei) Tseng Chun-hsin	5	3
(Spain) Martín Landaluce	7	6
WC	(Australia) Blake Ellis	3	6	1
(Italy) Stefano Travaglia	6	4	6
(Switzerland) Jérôme Kym	6	6
(Bolivia) Juan Carlos Prado Ángelo	3	0
(Australia) Dane Sweeny	6	4	6
26	(Italy) Andrea Pellegrino	2	6	3

Second round
(Spain) Martín Landaluce	6	1	4
(Italy) Stefano Travaglia	4	6	6
(Switzerland) Jérôme Kym	4	4
(Australia) Dane Sweeny	6	6

Qualifying competition
(Italy) Stefano Travaglia	6^{5}	6^{3}
(Australia) Dane Sweeny	7^{7}	7^{7}

=== Eleventh qualifier ===
First round
11	(United Kingdom) Jan Choinski	3	4
(Switzerland) Leandro Riedi	6	6
(Belgium) Kimmer Coppejans	7^{7}	6
Alt	(Australia) Omar Jasika	6^{2}	0
(Argentina) Juan Pablo Ficovich	5	3
(Austria) Jurij Rodionov	7	6
(Lebanon) Hady Habib	1	3
29	(United States) Zachary Svajda	6	6

Second round
(Switzerland) Leandro Riedi	6	3	4
(Belgium) Kimmer Coppejans	3	6	6
(Austria) Jurij Rodionov	1	4
29	(United States) Zachary Svajda	6	6

Qualifying competition
(Belgium) Kimmer Coppejans	6^{5}	2
29	(United States) Zachary Svajda	7^{7}	6

=== Twelfth qualifier ===
First round
12	(Finland) Otto Virtanen	3	6	4
(Colombia) Nicolás Mejía	6	3	6
(China) Wu Yibing	7	6
(United States) Mitchell Krueger	5	4
(United States) Tristan Boyer	6	6^{4}	6
(Argentina) Alex Barrena	2	7^{7}	2
(Estonia) Mark Lajal	6^{4}	4
27	(Italy) Francesco Passaro	7^{7}	6

Second round
(Colombia) Nicolás Mejía	4	4
(China) Wu Yibing	6	6
(United States) Tristan Boyer	6^{4}	6	6
27	(Italy) Francesco Passaro	7^{7}	4	2

Qualifying competition
(China) Wu Yibing	6	6
(United States) Tristan Boyer	3	2

=== Thirteenth qualifier ===
First round
13	(Serbia) Dušan Lajović	7^{7}	5	7^{10}
(Argentina) Facundo Díaz Acosta	6^{3}	7	6^{3}
(United States) Murphy Cassone	3	6	6
(Chinese Taipei) Hsu Yu-hsiou	6	3	4
(Ecuador) Álvaro Guillén Meza	5	3
(Brazil) Thiago Seyboth Wild	7	6
(Italy) Lorenzo Giustino	6^{4}	1
24	(Italy) Francesco Maestrelli	7^{7}	6

Second round
13	(Serbia) Dušan Lajović	7	6
(United States) Murphy Cassone	5	3
(Brazil) Thiago Seyboth Wild	6^{2}	4
24	(Italy) Francesco Maestrelli	7^{7}	6

Qualifying competition
13	(Serbia) Dušan Lajović	6	4	3
24	(Italy) Francesco Maestrelli	4	6	6

=== Fourteenth qualifier ===
First round
14	(Croatia) Dino Prižmić	6	6
(Argentina) Genaro Alberto Olivieri	1	4
PR	(Brazil) Gustavo Heide	6	6
(United Kingdom) Jay Clarke	3	3
(United Kingdom) Arthur Fery	6	6
WC	(Australia) Edward Winter	2	4
(Australia) Bernard Tomic	6	6
25	(Bolivia) Hugo Dellien	3	3

Second round
14	(Croatia) Dino Prižmić	7	6
PR	(Brazil) Gustavo Heide	5	2
(United Kingdom) Arthur Fery	6	6
(Australia) Bernard Tomic	4	2

Qualifying competition
14	(Croatia) Dino Prižmić	4	1
(United Kingdom) Arthur Fery	6	6

=== Fifteenth qualifier ===
First round
15	(United Kingdom) Billy Harris	3	4
(Luxembourg) Chris Rodesch	6	6
WC	(Australia) Li Tu	2	1
(Spain) Rafael Jódar	6	6
(Estonia) Daniil Glinka	5	6	6
(France) Clément Tabur	7	3	4
(France) Luca Van Assche	6	6
22	(Tunisia) Moez Echargui	4	2

Second round
(Luxembourg) Chris Rodesch	6^{10}	3
(Spain) Rafael Jódar	7^{12}	6
(Estonia) Daniil Glinka	3	0
(France) Luca Van Assche	6	6

Qualifying competition
(Spain) Rafael Jódar	6	0	6
(France) Luca Van Assche	3	6	1

=== Sixteenth qualifier ===
First round
16	(Spain) Roberto Carballés Baena	6	6
(France) Arthur Bouquier	2	2
(United Kingdom) Jack Pinnington Jones	4	4
(Belgium) Gilles-Arnaud Bailly	6	6
(United States) Martin Damm	6	3	6
(Belgium) Gauthier Onclin	3	6	4
(France) Titouan Droguet	6	6
21	(Chile) Nicolás Jarry	4	3

Second round
16	(Spain) Roberto Carballés Baena	6^{4}	7^{7}	2
(Belgium) Gilles-Arnaud Bailly	7^{7}	6^{3}	6
(United States) Martin Damm	6	6
(France) Titouan Droguet	4	3

Qualifying competition
(Belgium) Gilles-Arnaud Bailly	5	5
(United States) Martin Damm	7	7
