= Dimitar Kisimov =

Bulgarian tennis player (born 2008)

- Country (sports): Bulgaria
- Born: 11 April 2008 (age 18) Sofia, Bulgaria
- Height: 1.83 m (6 ft 0 in)
- Plays: Right-handed (two-handed backhand)
- Coach: Manuk
- Prize money: US $3,882

Singles
- Career record: 0–0
- Career titles: 0
- Highest ranking: No. 991 (26 October 2026)
- Current ranking: No. 991 (26 October 2026)

Grand Slam singles results
- Australian Open Junior: 1R (2026)
- French Open Junior: 2R (2026)
- Wimbledon Junior: QF (2026)
- US Open Junior: 3R (2026)

Doubles
- Career record: 0–0
- Career titles: 0

Grand Slam doubles results
- Australian Open Junior: W (2026)
- French Open Junior: 2R (2026)
- Wimbledon Junior: 1R (2026)
- US Open Junior: 1R (2026)
- Last updated on: 26 October 2026.

Dimitar Kisimov (born 11 April 2008) is a Bulgarian tennis player. He has a career-high ATP singles ranking of No. 991 achieved on 26 October 2026.

== Career ==
In 2025, Kisimov reached the singles final of the J300 Bradenton Tournament in the United States.

In January 2026, with his junior ranking up to world No. 25, Kisimov made his junior Grand Slam debut, losing to Ntungamili Raguin of Botswana at the 2026 Australian Open. Alongside Connor Doig of South Africa, Kisimov won the boys' doubles at the championships, defeating the Australian pair Ymerali Ibraimi and Cooper Kose in the final. The win came in just their fourth tournament playing together as a partnership.

Kisimov had good results on the ITF junior circuit, maintaining a 128–53 singles win-loss record and reached an ITF junior combined ranking of world No. 9 on 25 May 2026. In July 2026, he was a quarterfinalist in Juniors at the 2026 Wimbledon Championships, losing to Australian Cruz Hewitt.

== Junior Grand Slam finals ==
=== Doubles: 1 (title) ===
Result	Year	Tournament	Surface	Partner	Opponents	!Score
Win	2026	Australian Open	Hard	(South Africa) Connor Doig	(Australia) Ymerali Ibraimi (Australia) Cooper Kose	6–3, 6–4
