= Connor Doig =

South African tennis player (born 2008)

- Country (sports): South Africa
- Born: 14 January 2008 (age 18)
- Prize money: US $1,810

Singles
- Career record: 0–1
- Career titles: 0
- Highest ranking: No. 1,489 (28 July 2025)
- Current ranking: No. 1,597 (31 August 2026)

Grand Slam singles results
- Australian Open Junior: 1R (2025, 2026)
- French Open Junior: 3R (2026)
- Wimbledon Junior: 3R (2026)
- US Open Junior: 3R (2026)

Doubles
- Career record: 0–0
- Career titles: 0
- Highest ranking: No. 1,988 (21 July 2025)
- Current ranking: No. 2,292 (31 August 2026)

Grand Slam doubles results
- Australian Open Junior: W (2026)
- French Open Junior: 2R (2026)
- Wimbledon Junior: QF (2025)
- US Open Junior: 1R (2026)
- Last updated on: 6 August 2026.

Connor Doig (born 14 January 2008) is a South African tennis player. He has a career-high ATP singles ranking of No. 1,489 achieved on 28 July 2025 and a doubles ranking of No. 1,988 achieved on 21 July 2025.

Doig won the 2026 Australian Open Boys' doubles title alongside Dimitar Kisimov of Bulgaria.

== Early life ==
From Parkmore, Johannesburg, South Africa, Doig attended St Stithians College in Gauteng. He started playing tennis at age of three years-old and was coached by Ndu Ncube. In 2022, he won the South African U18 national title. Doig signed a letter of intent to compete for the Tulsa Golden Hurricane at the University of Tulsa in the United States in July 2023.

== Career ==
Having played junior qualifiers at the 2025 French Open, Doig qualified for the main draw of the boys singles' at the 2025 Wimbledon Championships, where he was defeated in two sets by Luis Guto Miguel of Brazil. Playing in the boys' doubles alongside Kriish Tyagi of India, he reached the quarter-final stage, where they faced Amir Omarkhanov and Egor Pleshivtsev of Kazhakstan.

Doig entered 2026 with his world junior combined ranking at number 44. Playing alongside Bulgarian Dimitar Kisimov, Doig won the final of the 2026 Australian Open in the Boys' doubles. They recorded a win over Keaton Hance and Tanishk Konduri to reach the semi-finals, where they beat Kirill Filaretov and Mark Ceban. Doig had previously been defeated by Briton Mark Ceban in the first round of the boys singles' at the championship, but after winning that tie, they went on to beat Australian pairing Ymerali Ibraimi and Cooper Kose in the final. In doing so, Doig became the first South African to win the title, with the win coming in just their fourth tournament playing together as a partnership.

== Junior Grand Slam finals ==
=== Doubles: 1 (1 title) ===
| Result | Year | Tournament | Surface | Partner | Opponents | !Score |
|---|---|---|---|---|---|---|
| Win | 2026 | Australian Open | Hard | (Bulgaria) Dimitar Kisimov | (Australia) Ymerali Ibraimi (Australia) Cooper Kose | 6-3, 6-4 |
