= Thea Frodin =

American tennis player (born 2008)

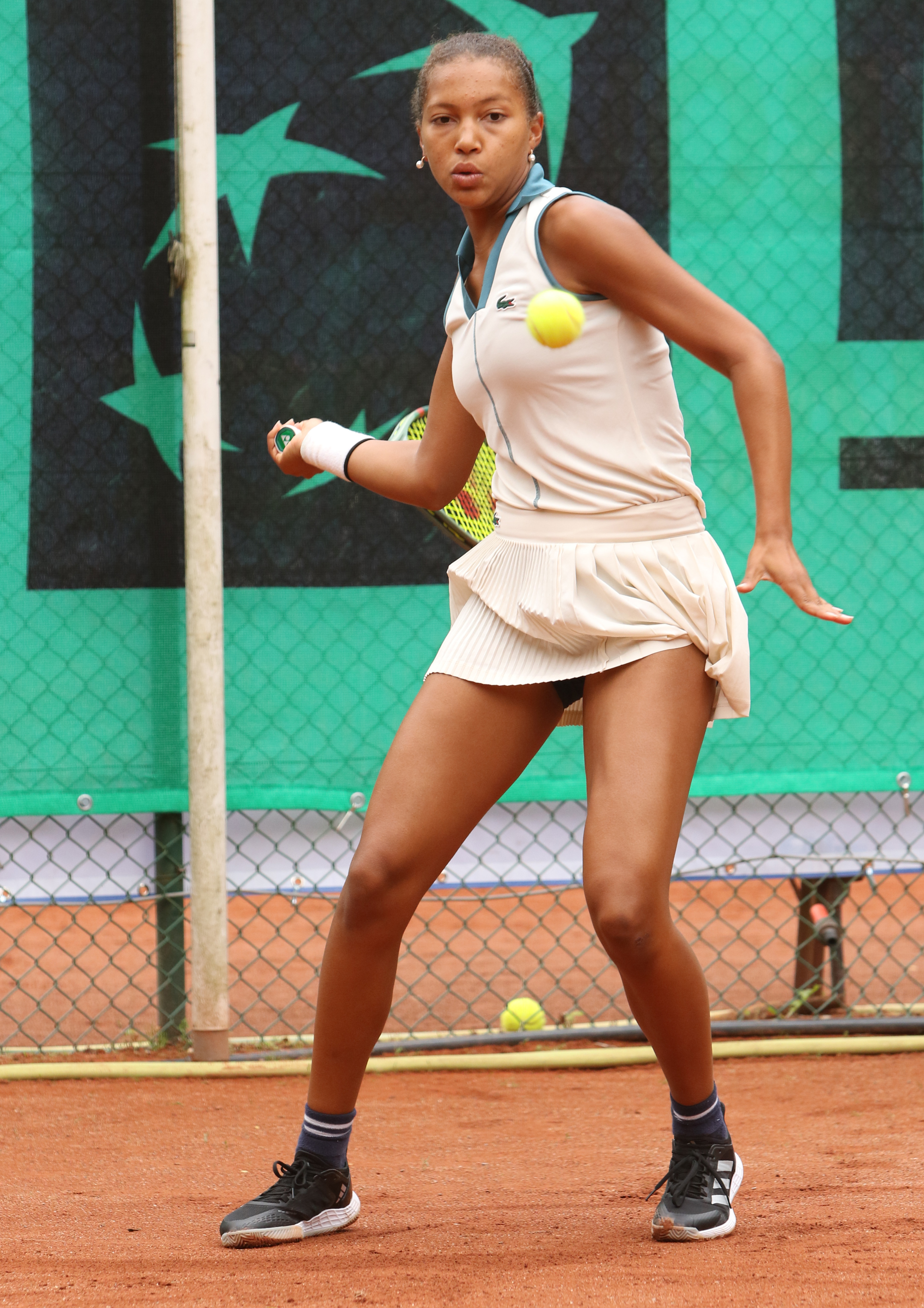
- Astrid Bowl, 27 May 2024
- Country (sports): United States
- Residence: Woodland Hills, Los Angeles
- Born: 17 December 2008 (age 17)
- Plays: Right (two-handed backhand)
- Prize money: US $37,943

Singles
- Career record: 29–29
- Career titles: 0
- Highest ranking: No. 580 (24 August 2026)
- Current ranking: No. 580 (24 August 2026)

Grand Slam singles results
- US Open: 1R (2026)
- Australian Open Junior: SF (2026)
- French Open Junior: 2R (2025)
- Wimbledon Junior: 3R (2026)

Doubles
- Career record: 11–18
- Career titles: 0
- Highest ranking: No. 710 (24 August 2026)
- Current ranking: No. 710 (24 August 2026)

Grand Slam doubles results
- US Open: 1R (2025)
- Australian Open Junior: QF (2026)
- French Open Junior: QF (2026)
- Wimbledon Junior: F (2025)
- US Open Junior: QF (2025, 2026)
- Last updated on: 24 August 2026.

Thea Frodin (born 17 December 2008) is an American tennis player. She has a WTA singles ranking of No. 580 achieved on 24 August 2026 and a doubles ranking of No. 710 reached on 24 August 2026.

== Early life ==
Frodin was born and raised in Southern California region, United States and lived in Woodland Hills, Los Angeles. She started taking tennis lessons in her early childhood.

== Junior career ==
In December 2023, Frodin was a runner-up at the prestigious Orange Bowl, in girls' 16s category. She made her debut at a major jr. at the 2024 French Open.

Frodin reached the second round of the girls' singles at the 2025 Australian Open before losing to Emerson Jones. At the 2025 Wimbledon Championships she lost in the first round to Mimi Xu. In the girls' doubles she reached the final alongside compatriot Julieta Pareja where they lost to Kristina Penickova and Vendula Valdmannova. The following month, she paired with Kristina Penickova to win the Girls' Doubles title at the USTA U18s National Championships in San Diego to earn a wildcard spot in the main draw at the 2025 US Open.

In January 2026, Frodin had her best performance in girls' singles at a major, reaching the semifinals at the 2026 Australian Open, where she lost to Ekaterina Tupitsyna.

== Senior career ==
A wildcard pairing with Kristina Penickova in the women's doubles at the 2025 US Open, they were drawn against compatriots Reese Brantmeier and Alanis Hamilton in the first round.

Awarded a wildcard into the main draw of the singles at the 2026 US Open after winning the USTA Billie Jean King Girls' 18s National Championships, she was defeated in the first round by No. 2 seed Elena Rybakina.

== Personal life ==
Her father, Mathias, is Swedish. Her mother was born in France and grew up in Gabon. Frodin has dual citizenship with Sweden.

She portrayed some tennis scenes of a young Serena Williams in the 2021 sports biographical film King Richard, starring Will Smith.

== ITF Circuit finals ==
=== Singles: 1 (1 runner–up) ===
Legend W35 tournaments (0–1)	Finals by surface Hard (0–1) Clay (–)

Result	W–L	Date	Tournament	Tier	Surface	Opponent	Score
Loss	0–1	Feb 2026	Arcadia Women's Pro Open, US	W35	Hard	(United States) Akasha Urhobo	2–6, 6–2, 2–6

=== Doubles: 1 (1 runner–up) ===
Legend W35 tournaments (0–1)	Finals by surface Hard (–) Clay (0–1)

Result	W–L	Date	Tournament	Tier	Surface	Partner	Opponents	Score
Loss	0–1	Nov 2025	ITF Orlando, US	W35	Clay	(United States) Welles Newman	(United States) Samantha Alicea (United States) Malkia Ngounoue	1–6, 7–6^{(5)}, [9–11]

== Junior Grand Slam finals ==
=== Doubles: 1 (runner-up) ===
Result	Year	Tournament	Surface	Partner	Opponent	Score
Loss	2025	Wimbledon	Grass	(United States) Julieta Pareja	(United States) Kristina Penickova (Czech Republic) Vendula Valdmannová	4–6, 2–6
