= Kai Thompson =

Hong Kong tennis player (born 2008)

- Country (sports): Hong Kong
- Born: 25 July 2008 (age 18) Hong Kong
- Prize money: US $5,257

Singles
- Career record: 0–0 (at ATP Tour level, Grand Slam level, and in Davis Cup)
- Career titles: 0
- Highest ranking: No. 1,757 (22 June 2026)
- Current ranking: No. 2,167 (16 November 2026)

Grand Slam singles results
- Australian Open Junior: QF (2026)
- French Open Junior: 1R (2026)
- Wimbledon Junior: 1R (2026)
- US Open Junior: 3R (2026)

Doubles
- Career record: 0–1 (at ATP Tour level, Grand Slam level, and in Davis Cup)
- Career titles: 0

Grand Slam doubles results
- Australian Open Junior: 1R (2026)
- French Open Junior: 1R (2026)
- Wimbledon Junior: 1R (2026)
- US Open Junior: 2R (2026)
- Last updated on: 20 September 2026.

Kai Thompson (Chinese: 朱鍇泓; pinyin: Zhū Kǎihóng; Jyutping: jyu^{1} kaai^{2} wang^{4}; born 25 July 2008) is a tennis player from Hong Kong. He has a career-high ATP singles ranking of No. 1,757 achieved on 22 June 2026.

Thompson has a career-high ITF junior ranking of world No. 20 achieved on 21 September 2026.

== Career ==
Thompson received a wildcard into the main doubles draw of the 2026 ATP Hong Kong Tennis Open with Zhou Yi as his partner, where they lost to Théo Arribagé and Albano Olivetti in the first round. He also received a wildcard into the singles qualifiers, where he lost to Emilio Nava in the first qualifying round.

In January 2026, he reached the boys' singles quarterfinals of the Australian Open before losing to Zangar Nurlanuly.
