= 2026 Australian Open – Girls' doubles =

Tennis championship

Girls' doubles
- 2026 Australian Open

Final
- Champions: (Czech Republic) Alena Kovačková (Czech Republic) Jana Kovačková
- Runners-up: (Czech Republic) Tereza Heřmanová (Czech Republic) Denisa Žoldáková
- Score: 6–1, 6–3
- Date: 31 January 2026

Details
- Draw: 32
- Seeds: 8

Events
Singles	men	women		boys	girls
Doubles	men	women	mixed	boys	girls
WC Singles	men	women	quad	boys	girls
WC Doubles	men	women	quad	boys	girls
- Australian Open

Alena and Jana Kovačková won the girls' doubles title at the 2026 Australian Open, defeating Tereza Heřmanová and Denisa Žoldáková in the final, 6–1, 6–3.

Annika and Kristina Penickova were the reigning champions, but did not participate this year.

== Seeds ==
1. (Czech Republic) Alena Kovačková / (Czech Republic) Jana Kovačková (champions)
2. (Brazil) Victoria Luiza Barros / (France) Ksenia Efremova (withdrew)
3. (Serbia) Anastasija Cvetković / (United States) Thea Frodin (quarterfinals)
4. (China) Shao Yushan / (China) Sun Xinran (first round)
5. (Germany) Mariella Thamm / (China) Zhang Ruien (second round)
6. (South Korea) Lee Ha-eum / (Japan) Kanon Sawashiro (first round)
7. (Romania) Maia Ilinca Burcescu / (Slovakia) Kali Šupová (second round)
8. (Canada) Nadia Lagaev / (Ukraine) Antonina Sushkova (second round)

== Draw ==
Key

- Q = Qualifier
- WC = Wild card
- LL = Lucky loser
- Alt = Alternate
- ITF = ITF entry
- PR = Protected ranking
- SR = Special ranking
- SE = Special exempt
- JE = Junior exempt
- JR = Junior Accelerator Programme entrant
- CO = College Accelerator Programme entrant
- NG = Next Gen Accelerator Program entrant
- w/o = Walkover
- r = Retired
- d = Defaulted

=== Finals ===
Semifinals
1	(Czech Republic) Alena Kovačková (Czech Republic) Jana Kovačková	6	6
Mariia Makarova; Rada Zolotareva	4	4
(Czech Republic) Tereza Heřmanová (Czech Republic) Denisa Žoldáková	6	7^{8}
Alexandra Malova; Alisa Terentyeva	4	6^{6}

Final
1	(Czech Republic) Alena Kovačková (Czech Republic) Jana Kovačková	6	6
(Czech Republic) Tereza Heřmanová (Czech Republic) Denisa Žoldáková	1	3

=== Top half ===
First round
1	(Czech Republic) Alena Kovačková (Czech Republic) Jana Kovačková	6	6
(Turkey) Ada Kümrü (China) Lin Yujun	2	2
WC	(Australia) Sarah Mildren (Australia) Koharu Nishikawa	3	2
(Czech Republic) Sofie Hettlerová (Netherlands) Antonia Stoyanov	6	6
(Sweden) Iva Marinkovic (United Kingdom) Hollie Smart	6	6
Anastasia Lizunova; Ekaterina Tupitsyna	3	3
(United States) Capucine Jauffret (Australia) Tahlia Kokkinis	7^{7}	6
6	(South Korea) Lee Ha-eum (Japan) Kanon Sawashiro	6^{3}	3
3	(Serbia) Anastasija Cvetković (United States) Thea Frodin	6	6
WC	(Australia) Musemma Cilek (Australia) Scarlett Dattoli	1	0
(South Africa) Jahnie van Zyl (Japan) Riyo Yoshida	6	4	[3]
(China) Qu Yihan (China) Wei Zhangqian	2	6	[10]
Mariia Makarova; Rada Zolotareva	6	6
(Australia) Ava Beck (Australia) Giselle Isabell Guillen	2	3
(United States) Carrie-Anne Hoo (Chinese Taipei) Lin Yu-chen	4	5
7	(Romania) Maia Ilinca Burcescu (Slovakia) Kali Šupová	6	7

Second round
1	(Czech Republic) A Kovačková (Czech Republic) J Kovačková	6	6
(Czech Republic) S Hettlerová (Netherlands) A Stoyanov	2	2
(Sweden) I Marinkovic (United Kingdom) H Smart	3	6	[7]
(United States) C Jauffret (Australia) T Kokkinis	6	4	[10]
3	(Serbia) A Cvetković (United States) T Frodin	6	6
(China) Y Qu (China) Z Wei	3	4
M Makarova; R Zolotareva	6	4	[10]
7	(Romania) MI Burcescu (Slovakia) K Šupová	3	6	[6]

Quarterfinals
1	(Czech Republic) A Kovačková (Czech Republic) J Kovačková	6	6
(United States) C Jauffret (Australia) T Kokkinis	2	2
3	(Serbia) A Cvetković (United States) T Frodin	4	5
M Makarova; R Zolotareva	6	7

Semifinals
1	(Czech Republic) A Kovačková (Czech Republic) J Kovačková	6	6
M Makarova; R Zolotareva	4	4

=== Bottom half ===
First round
8	(Canada) Nadia Lagaev (Ukraine) Antonina Sushkova	6	4	[10]
(Ukraine) Sofiia Bielinska (Argentina) Sol Ailin Larraya Guidi	1	6	[3]
(United States) Chukwumelije Clarke (United States) Nancy Lee	6	7
(China) Geng Xinle (Serbia) Luna Vujović	2	5
WC	(Australia) Emilie Chen (Australia) Jizelle Sibai	6	4	[5]
Felitsata Dorofeeva-Rybas; Anna Pushkareva	0	6	[10]
(Czech Republic) Tereza Heřmanová (Czech Republic) Denisa Žoldáková	3	7^{8}	[10]
4	(China) Shao Yushan (China) Sun Xinran	6	6^{6}	[5]
5	(Germany) Mariella Thamm (China) Zhang Ruien	7	6^{2}	[10]
(New Zealand) Aishi Das (Ukraine) Polina Skliar	5	7^{7}	[6]
(Jamaica) Alyssa James (Poland) Maja Pawelska	2	6	[10]
(United States) Ciara Harding (Japan) Rira Kosaka	6	4	[6]
Alexandra Malova; Alisa Terentyeva	6	6
WC	(Australia) Ellen Hirschi (Australia) Tori Russell	2	4
(Australia) Renee Alame (India) Maaya Rajeshwaran Revathi	6	6
Alt	(Japan) Azuna Ichioka (Japan) Ran Wakana	4	2

Second round
8	(Canada) N Lagaev (Ukraine) A Sushkova	4	2
(United States) C Clarke (United States) N Lee	6	6
F Dorofeeva-Rybas; A Pushkareva	5	4
(Czech Republic) T Heřmanová (Czech Republic) D Žoldáková	7	6
5	(Germany) M Thamm (China) R Zhang	6	6^{4}	[5]
(Jamaica) A James (Poland) M Pawelska	3	7^{7}	[10]
A Malova; A Terentyeva	6	5	[10]
(Australia) R Alame (India) M Rajeshwaran Revathi	1	7	[7]

Quarterfinals
(United States) C Clarke (United States) N Lee	4	3
(Czech Republic) T Heřmanová (Czech Republic) D Žoldáková	6	6
(Jamaica) A James (Poland) M Pawelska	6	3	[5]
A Malova; A Terentyeva	2	6	[10]

Semifinals
(Czech Republic) T Heřmanová (Czech Republic) D Žoldáková	6	7^{8}
A Malova; A Terentyeva	4	6^{6}
