= 2026 Australian Open – Girls' singles =

Tennis championship

Girls' singles
- 2026 Australian Open

Final
- Champion: (France) Ksenia Efremova
- Runner-up: Ekaterina Tupitsyna
- Score: 6–3, 7–5
- Date: 1 February 2026

Details
- Draw: 64
- Seeds: 16

Events
Singles	men	women		boys	girls
Doubles	men	women	mixed	boys	girls
WC Singles	men	women	quad	boys	girls
WC Doubles	men	women	quad	boys	girls
- Australian Open

Ksenia Efremova won the girls' singles title at the 2026 Australian Open, defeating Ekaterina Tupitsyna in the final, 6–3, 7–5.

Wakana Sonobe was the defending champion, but she was no longer eligible to participate in junior events having elevated to senior level and did not participate in that level this year.

== Seeds ==
1. (Czech Republic) Alena Kovačková (third round)
2. (Czech Republic) Jana Kovačková (second round)
3. (France) Ksenia Efremova (champion)
4. (Brazil) Victoria Luiza Barros (second round, withdrew)
5. (China) Zhang Ruien (third round)
6. (China) Sun Xinran (quarterfinals)
7. (Serbia) Anastasija Cvetković (first round)
8. (United States) Thea Frodin (semifinals)
9. (Argentina) Sol Ailin Larraya Guidi (first round)
10. (Japan) Kanon Sawashiro (quarterfinals)
11. (China) Shao Yushan (quarterfinals)
12. (Serbia) Luna Vujović (second round)
13. Mariia Makarova (quarterfinals)
14. (Canada) Nadia Lagaev (third round)
15. (Australia) Tahlia Kokkinis (first round)
16. (Czech Republic) Sofie Hettlerová (first round)

Click on the seed number of a player to go to their draw section.

== Draw ==
Key

- Q = Qualifier
- WC = Wild card
- LL = Lucky loser
- Alt = Alternate
- ITF = ITF entry
- PR = Protected ranking
- SR = Special ranking
- SE = Special exempt
- JE = Junior exempt
- JR = Junior Accelerator Programme entrant
- CO = College Accelerator Programme entrant
- NG = Next Gen Accelerator Program entrant
- w/o = Walkover
- r = Retired
- d = Defaulted

=== Finals ===
Quarterfinals
13	Mariia Makarova	3	0
8	(United States) Thea Frodin	6	6
Ekaterina Tupitsyna	3	7	7
6	(China) Sun Xinran	6	5	5
10	(Japan) Kanon Sawashiro	3	5
3	(France) Ksenia Efremova	6	7
11	(China) Shao Yushan	5	3
Rada Zolotareva	7	6

Semifinals
8	(United States) Thea Frodin	3	4
Ekaterina Tupitsyna	6	6
3	(France) Ksenia Efremova	6	4	6
Rada Zolotareva	0	6	4

Final
Ekaterina Tupitsyna	3	5
3	(France) Ksenia Efremova	6	7

=== Top half ===
==== Section 1 ====
First round
1	(Czech Republic) Alena Kovačková	6	6
(United States) Chukwumelije Clarke	1	4
WC	(Australia) Tori Russell	6	6^{3}	6
Q	(South Africa) Jahnie van Zyl	4	7^{7}	1
WC	(Japan) Ran Wakana	1	2
(Germany) Mariella Thamm	6	6
Q	(China) Lin Yujun	5	6	3
13	Mariia Makarova	7	4	6
9	(Argentina) Sol Ailin Larraya Guidi	6	4	3
WC	(Australia) Ellen Hirschi	4	6	6
(China) Wei Zhangqian	6^{1}	4
(Ukraine) Antonina Sushkova	7^{7}	6
Anastasia Lizunova	6	7
Q	(Japan) Riyo Yoshida	2	5
(Poland) Maja Pawelska	6	3	2
8	(United States) Thea Frodin	3	6	6

Second round
1	(Czech Republic) A Kovačková	6	6
WC	(Australia) T Russell	3	0
(Germany) M Thamm	4	3
13	M Makarova	6	6
WC	(Australia) E Hirschi	2	6	5
(Ukraine) A Sushkova	6	2	7
A Lizunova	5	4
8	(United States) T Frodin	7	6

Third round
1	(Czech Republic) A Kovačková	6^{3}	5
13	M Makarova	7^{7}	7
(Ukraine) A Sushkova	4	5
8	(United States) T Frodin	6	7

Quarterfinals
13	M Makarova	3	0
8	(United States) T Frodin	6	6

==== Section 2 ====
First round
4	(Brazil) Victoria Luiza Barros	6	7^{7}
WC	(Australia) Jizelle Sibai	4	6^{3}
Q	(Japan) Rira Kosaka	2	3
Ekaterina Tupitsyna	6	6
(Ukraine) Sofiia Bielinska	6	6
WC	(Australia) Emilie Chen	3	4
(Romania) Maia Ilinca Burcescu	6	6
16	(Czech Republic) Sofie Hettlerová	3	2
12	(Serbia) Luna Vujović	6	6
(Sweden) Iva Marinkovic	2	2
LL	(France) Laura Valentine Pop	6	1	0
(Czech Republic) Denisa Žoldáková	4	6	6
(Australia) Renee Alame	6	6
Q	(United States) Ciara Harding	3	3
(South Korea) Lee Ha-eum	4	2
6	(China) Sun Xinran	6	6

Second round
4	(Brazil) VL Barros
E Tupitsyna	w/o
(Ukraine) S Bielinska	6	6
(Romania) MI Burcescu	0	4
12	(Serbia) L Vujović	2	3
(Czech Republic) D Žoldáková	6	6
(Australia) R Alame	2	7	1
6	(China) X Sun	6	5	6

Third round
E Tupitsyna	6	7^{7}
(Ukraine) S Bielinska	2	6^{5}
(Czech Republic) D Žoldáková	6^{6}	3
6	(China) X Sun	7^{8}	6

Quarterfinals
E Tupitsyna	3	7	7
6	(China) X Sun	6	5	5

=== Bottom half ===
==== Section 3 ====
First round
5	(China) Zhang Ruien	6	3	6
Alisa Terentyeva	1	6	3
(United States) Carrie-Anne Hoo	2	6^{10}
(Chinese Taipei) Lin Yu-chen	6	7^{12}
(Slovakia) Kali Šupová	4	3
Alexandra Malova	6	6
WC	(Australia) Ava Beck	3	0
10	(Japan) Kanon Sawashiro	6	6
14	(Canada) Nadia Lagaev	6	6
Felitsata Dorofeeva-Rybas	2	3
(Australia) Giselle Isabell Guillen	1	3
(Netherlands) Antonia Stoyanov	6	6
Q	(Ukraine) Polina Skliar	6	6
(Czech Republic) Tereza Heřmanová	4	2
(China) Geng Xinle	3	0
3	(France) Ksenia Efremova	6	6

Second round
5	(China) R Zhang	6	4	6
(Chinese Taipei) Y-c Lin	1	6	2
A Malova	2	4
10	(Japan) K Sawashiro	6	6
14	(Canada) N Lagaev	4	7	6
(Netherlands) A Stoyanov	6	5	3
Q	(Ukraine) P Skliar	2	6	0
3	(France) K Efremova	6	1	6

Third round
5	(China) R Zhang	4	5
10	(Japan) K Sawashiro	6	7
14	(Canada) N Lagaev	2	1
3	(France) K Efremova	6	6

Quarterfinals
10	(Japan) K Sawashiro	3	5
3	(France) K Efremova	6	7

==== Section 4 ====
First round
7	(Serbia) Anastasija Cvetković	2	6	2
Q	(New Zealand) Aishi Das	6	4	6
Anna Pushkareva	6	6
(India) Maaya Rajeshwaran Revathi	4	1
WC	(Australia) Sarah Mildren	6^{4}	6	6
SE	(Venezuela) Sabrina Balderrama	7^{7}	1	3
(United States) Capucine Jauffret	1	4
11	(China) Shao Yushan	6	6
15	(Australia) Tahlia Kokkinis	4	5
(China) Qu Yihan	6	7
(United Kingdom) Hollie Smart	7	6^{7}	3^{r}
Q	(Japan) Azuna Ichioka	5	7^{9}	2
Rada Zolotareva	6	6
(United States) Nancy Lee	4	1
(Jamaica) Alyssa James	6	6^{6}	2
2	(Czech Republic) Jana Kovačková	3	7^{8}	6

Second round
Q	(New Zealand) A Das	3	2
A Pushkareva	6	6
WC	(Australia) S Mildren	6^{7}	1
11	(China) Y Shao	7^{9}	6
(China) Y Qu	6	6
Q	(Japan) A Ichioka	2	0
R Zolotareva	7	6
2	(Czech Republic) J Kovačková	5	4

Third round
A Pushkareva	6	3	4
11	(China) Y Shao	4	6	6
(China) Y Qu	6	6^{3}	1
R Zolotareva	3	7^{7}	6

Quarterfinals
11	(China) Y Shao	5	3
R Zolotareva	7	6

== Qualifying ==
=== Seeds ===
1. (Turkey) Ada Kümrü (qualifying competition)
2. (China) Lin Yujun (qualified)
3. (South Korea) Jeong Ui-su (first round)
4. (United States) Anita Tu (first round)
5. (Japan) Riyo Yoshida (qualified)
6. (Japan) Rira Kosaka (qualified)
7. (Ukraine) Polina Skliar (qualified)
8. (South Africa) Jahnie van Zyl (qualified)
9. (Italy) Ilary Pistola (first round)
10. (Chile) Camila Rodero (first round)
11. (Romania) Ioana Ștefania Boian (first round)
12. (New Zealand) Aishi Das (qualified)
13. (France) Laura Valentine Pop (qualifying competition, lucky loser)
14. (China) Wu Ruxi (first round)
15. (Turkey) Nehir Doğan (qualifying competition)
16. (Japan) Kokona Ishii (qualifying competition)

=== Qualifiers ===
1. (New Zealand) Aishi Das
2. (China) Lin Yujun
3. (United States) Ciara Harding
4. (Japan) Azuna Ichioka
5. (Japan) Riyo Yoshida
6. (Japan) Rira Kosaka
7. (Ukraine) Polina Skliar
8. (South Africa) Jahnie van Zyl

=== Lucky loser ===
1. (France) Laura Valentine Pop

=== Draw ===
==== First qualifier ====
First round
1	(Turkey) Ada Kümrü	6	6
(Australia) Gurmanat Kaur Sandhu	1	1
Alt	(New Zealand) Lucia Gale	3	0
12	(New Zealand) Aishi Das	6	6

Qualifying competition
1	(Turkey) Ada Kümrü	3	2
12	(New Zealand) Aishi Das	6	6

==== Second qualifier ====
First round
2	(China) Lin Yujun	6	3
WC	(Australia) Scarlett Dattoli	1	0^{r}
Daria Koreshkova	6	3	7
10	(Chile) Camila Rodero	4	6	5

Qualifying competition
2	(China) Lin Yujun	6	6
Daria Koreshkova	1	4

==== Third qualifier ====
First round
3	(South Korea) Jeong Ui-su	4	2
(United States) Ciara Harding	6	6
WC	(Australia) Georgia Campbell	6	6
11	(Romania) Ioana-Stefania Boian	3	4

Qualifying competition
(United States) Ciara Harding	7	6
WC	(Australia) Georgia Campbell	5	1

==== Fourth qualifier ====
First round
4	(United States) Anita Tu	5	2
(India) Diya Ramesh	7	6
(Japan) Azuna Ichioka	4	6	6
9	(Italy) Ilary Pistola	6	4	1

Qualifying competition
(India) Diya Ramesh	3	2
(Japan) Azuna Ichioka	6	6

==== Fifth qualifier ====
First round
5	(Japan) Riyo Yoshida	6	7
WC	(Australia) Taylah Lessue	2	5
(Canada) Andrea Cabio	6	5	6
14	(China) Wu Ruxi	4	7	2

Qualifying competition
5	(Japan) Riyo Yoshida	6	6
(Canada) Andrea Cabio	3	4

==== Sixth qualifier ====
First round
6	(Japan) Rira Kosaka	6	6
(United Kingdom) Rosie Cho	2	2
(Australia) Koharu Nishikawa	0	2
13	(France) Laura Valentine Pop	6	6

Qualifying competition
6	(Japan) Rira Kosaka	7	6
13	(France) Laura Valentine Pop	5	4

==== Seventh qualifier ====
First round
7	(Ukraine) Polina Skliar	6	6
(Japan) Rito Arima	0	1
WC	(Australia) Ava Itaoui	3	4
15	(Turkey) Nehir Doğan	6	6

Qualifying competition
7	(Ukraine) Polina Skliar	6	6
15	(Turkey) Nehir Doğan	2	3

==== Eighth qualifier ====
First round
8	(South Africa) Jahnie van Zyl	6	6
WC	(Australia) Musemma Cilek	4	4
(Turkey) Ayşe Bal	3	3
16	(Japan) Kokona Ishii	6	6

Qualifying competition
8	(South Africa) Jahnie van Zyl	7	4	6
16	(Japan) Kokona Ishii	5	6	4
