= 2026 Australian Open – Boys' doubles =

Tennis championship

Boys' doubles
- 2026 Australian Open

Final
- Champions: (South Africa) Connor Doig (Bulgaria) Dimitar Kisimov
- Runners-up: (Australia) Ymerali Ibraimi (Australia) Cooper Kose
- Score: 6–3, 6–4
- Date: 31 January 2026

Details
- Draw: 32
- Seeds: 8

Events
Singles	men	women		boys	girls
Doubles	men	women	mixed	boys	girls
WC Singles	men	women	quad	boys	girls
WC Doubles	men	women	quad	boys	girls
- Australian Open

Connor Doig and Dimitar Kisimov won the boys' doubles tennis title at the 2026 Australian Open, defeating Ymerali Ibraimi and Cooper Kose 6–3, 6–4 in the final.

Maxwell Exsted and Jan Kumstát were the reigning champions, but were no longer eligible to compete in junior events.

== Seeds ==
1. (France) Yannick Theodor Alexandrescou / (Japan) Ryo Tabata (second round)
2. (Brazil) Luís Guto Miguel / (Slovenia) Žiga Šeško (quarterfinals, withdrew)
3. (Ukraine) Nikita Bilozertsev / (Germany) Jamie Mackenzie (first round)
4. (United States) Keaton Hance / (United States) Tanishk Konduri (quarterfinals)
5. (Chinese Taipei) Chen Kuan-hsou / (Switzerland) Flynn Thomas (first round)
6. (Kazakhstan) Zangar Nurlanuly / (Kazakhstan) Damir Zhalgasbay (first round)
7. (Puerto Rico) Yannik Álvarez / (United States) Jack Secord (first round)
8. (United States) Ryan Cozad / (United States) Gavin Goode (second round)

== Draw ==
Key

- Q = Qualifier
- WC = Wild card
- LL = Lucky loser
- Alt = Alternate
- ITF = ITF entry
- PR = Protected ranking
- SR = Special ranking
- SE = Special exempt
- JE = Junior exempt
- JR = Junior Accelerator Programme entrant
- CO = College Accelerator Programme entrant
- NG = Next Gen Accelerator Program entrant
- w/o = Walkover
- r = Retired
- d = Defaulted

=== Finals ===
Semifinals
(Japan) Hyu Kawanishi (Japan) Kanta Watanabe	6^{4}	6	[6]
WC	(Australia) Ymerali Ibraimi (Australia) Cooper Kose	7^{7}	4	[10]
(South Africa) Connor Doig (Bulgaria) Dimitar Kisimov	6	4	[10]
(United Kingdom) Mark Ceban; Kirill Filaretov	3	6	[6]

Final
WC	(Australia) Ymerali Ibraimi (Australia) Cooper Kose	3	4
(South Africa) Connor Doig (Bulgaria) Dimitar Kisimov	6	6

=== Top half ===
First round
1	(France) Yannick Theodor Alexandrescou (Japan) Ryo Tabata	6	6
(India) Arnav Vijay Paparkar (United States) Roshan Santhosh	2	4
(Ecuador) Emilio Camacho (Brazil) Leonardo Storck França	5	4
(Japan) Hyu Kawanishi (Japan) Kanta Watanabe	7	6
(Australia) Jake Dembo (Australia) Daniel Jovanovski	6	7
(Spain) Tito Chávez (Latvia) Rihards Neimanis	2	5
(Thailand) Kunanan Pantaratorn (Hong Kong) Kai Thompson	1	4
8	(United States) Ryan Cozad (United States) Gavin Goode	6	6
3	(Ukraine) Nikita Bilozertsev (Germany) Jamie Mackenzie	6^{6}	6	[5]
WC	(Australia) Ymerali Ibraimi (Australia) Cooper Kose	7^{8}	4	[10]
(Poland) Aleksander Błuś (Spain) Valentín González-Galiño	1	3
(Austria) Thilo Behrmann (France) Aaron Gabet	6	6
(South Africa) John Bothma (United States) Carel Aubriel Ngounoue	3	6	[8]
WC	(Australia) Lachlan King (Australia) Raphael Savelli	6	1	[10]
(Colombia) Juan Miguel Bolívar Idárraga (United States) Vihaan Reddy	6	7^{9}
5	(Chinese Taipei) Chen Kuan-shou (Switzerland) Flynn Thomas	2	6^{7}

Second round
1	(France) YT Alexandrescou (Japan) R Tabata	6^{7}	2
(Japan) H Kawanishi (Japan) K Watanabe	7^{9}	6
(Australia) J Dembo (Australia) D Jovanovski	7	6
8	(United States) R Cozad (United States) G Goode	5	3
WC	(Australia) Y Ibraimi (Australia) C Kose	7^{7}	6^{4}	[10]
(Austria) T Behrmann (France) A Gabet	6^{0}	7^{7}	[5]
WC	(Australia) L King (Australia) R Savelli	2	6	[8]
(Colombia) JM Bolívar Idárraga (United States) V Reddy	6	3	[10]

Quarterfinals
(Japan) H Kawanishi (Japan) K Watanabe	6	6
(Australia) J Dembo (Australia) D Jovanovski	3	2
WC	(Australia) Y Ibraimi (Australia) C Kose	6	6
(Colombia) JM Bolívar Idárraga (United States) V Reddy	2	4

Semifinals
(Japan) H Kawanishi (Japan) K Watanabe	6^{4}	6	[6]
WC	(Australia) Y Ibraimi (Australia) C Kose	7^{7}	4	[10]

=== Bottom half ===
First round
6	(Kazakhstan) Zangar Nurlanuly (Kazakhstan) Damir Zhalgasbay	5	3
(South Africa) Connor Doig (Bulgaria) Dimitar Kisimov	7	6
(France) Daniel Jade (France) Mickael Kaouk	6	4	[8]
WC	(Australia) Ethan Domingo (Australia) Taiki Takizawa	2	6	[10]
(Italy) Matteo Gribaldo (Italy) Simone Massellani	7^{7}	6
(Poland) Jan Chłodnicki (Kazakhstan) Daniel Tazabekov	6^{3}	4
(Greece) Odysseas Geladaris (Botswana) Ntungamili Raguin	7^{7}	3	[8]
4	(United States) Keaton Hance (United States) Tanishk Konduri	6^{5}	6	[10]
7	(Puerto Rico) Yannik Álvarez (United States) Jack Secord	5	4
(Turkey) Kaan Işık Koşaner (Turkey) Mustafa Ege Şık	7	6
(United Kingdom) Mark Ceban; Kirill Filaretov	3	6	[11]
Savva Rybkin (Slovakia) Leon Sloboda	6	1	[9]
WC	(Australia) Sehun Park (Australia) Har Abir Sekhon	7	6
Alt	(Italy) Raffaele Ciurnelli (Canada) Dani Szabo	5	3
(China) Kang Kaigaoge; Marat Salbiev	5	3
2	(Brazil) Luís Guto Miguel (Slovenia) Žiga Šeško	7	6

Second round
(South Africa) C Doig (Bulgaria) D Kisimov	7	7^{7}
WC	(Australia) E Domingo (Australia) T Takizawa	5	6^{3}
(Italy) M Gribaldo (Italy) S Massellani	5	4
4	(United States) K Hance (United States) T Konduri	7	6
(Turkey) KI Koşaner (Turkey) ME Şık	3	2
(United Kingdom) M Ceban; K Filaretov	6	6
WC	(Australia) S Park (Australia) HA Sekhon	0	2
2	(Brazil) LG Miguel (Slovenia) Ž Šeško	6	6

Quarterfinals
(South Africa) C Doig (Bulgaria) D Kisimov	7^{7}	7^{7}
4	(United States) K Hance (United States) T Konduri	6^{6}	6^{4}
(United Kingdom) M Ceban; K Filaretov	w/o
2	(Brazil) LG Miguel (Slovenia) Ž Šeško

Semifinals
(South Africa) C Doig (Bulgaria) D Kisimov	6	4	[10]
(United Kingdom) M Ceban; K Filaretov	3	6	[6]
