= 2026 Australian Open – Boys' singles =

Tennis championship

Boys' singles
- 2026 Australian Open

Final
- Champion: (Slovenia) Žiga Šeško
- Runner-up: (United States) Keaton Hance
- Score: 4–6, 6–3, 6–4
- Date: 1 February 2026

Details
- Draw: 64
- Seeds: 16

Events
Singles	men	women		boys	girls
Doubles	men	women	mixed	boys	girls
WC Singles	men	women	quad	boys	girls
WC Doubles	men	women	quad	boys	girls
- Australian Open

Žiga Šeško won the boys' singles title at the 2026 Australian Open, defeating Keaton Hance in the final, 4–6, 6–3, 6–4. Šeško became the first Slovenian male player to win a major title in any discipline, and the first Slovene to win any major title since Kaja Juvan at the 2017 Wimbledon Championships girls' doubles.

Henry Bernet was the reigning champion, but was no longer eligible to participate in junior events. He received a wild card into the men's singles qualifying, but lost to Pablo Llamas Ruiz in the first round.

By qualifying for the main draw, Ntungamili Raguin became the first player representing Botswana, male or female, to contest a Grand Slam main draw in history. Raguin eventually fell to the second seed, Luís Guto Miguel.

== Seeds ==
1. (France) Yannick Theodor Alexandrescou (first round)
2. (Brazil) Luís Guto Miguel (quarterfinals)
3. (Japan) Ryo Tabata (semifinals)
4. (United States) Keaton Hance (final)
5. (Germany) Jamie Mackenzie (quarterfinals)
6. (Ukraine) Nikita Bilozertsev (third round)
7. (Slovenia) Žiga Šeško (champion)
8. (Kazakhstan) Zangar Nurlanuly (semifinals)
9. Savva Rybkin (third round)
10. (Austria) Thilo Behrmann (third round)
11. (Chinese Taipei) Chen Kuan-shou (quarterfinals)
12. (Switzerland) Flynn Thomas (third round)
13. (United States) Jack Secord (second round)
14. (Spain) Tito Chávez (first round, retired)
15. (United States) Gavin Goode (second round)
16. (Puerto Rico) Yannik Álvarez (first round)

Click on the seed number of a player to go to their draw section.

== Draw ==
Key

- Q = Qualifier
- WC = Wild card
- LL = Lucky loser
- Alt = Alternate
- ITF = ITF entry
- PR = Protected ranking
- SR = Special ranking
- SE = Special exempt
- JE = Junior exempt
- JR = Junior Accelerator Programme entrant
- CO = College Accelerator Programme entrant
- NG = Next Gen Accelerator Program entrant
- w/o = Walkover
- r = Retired
- d = Defaulted

=== Finals ===
Quarterfinals
(Hong Kong) Kai Thompson	6	6^{4}	4
8	(Kazakhstan) Zangar Nurlanuly	3	7^{7}	6
4	(United States) Keaton Hance	7^{9}	6
11	(Chinese Taipei) Chen Kuan-shou	6^{7}	4
5	(Germany) Jamie Mackenzie	7^{7}	4	6^{7}
3	(Japan) Ryo Tabata	6^{3}	6	7^{10}
7	(Slovenia) Žiga Šeško	6	7^{7}
2	(Brazil) Luís Guto Miguel	2	6^{5}

Semifinals
8	(Kazakhstan) Zangar Nurlanuly	3	2
4	(United States) Keaton Hance	6	6
3	(Japan) Ryo Tabata	3	3
7	(Slovenia) Žiga Šeško	6	6

Final
4	(United States) Keaton Hance	6	3	4
7	(Slovenia) Žiga Šeško	4	6	6

=== Top half ===
==== Section 1 ====
First round
1	(France) Yannick Theodor Alexandrescou	6^{5}	2
(Romania) Matei Todoran	7^{7}	6
(United States) Roshan Santhosh	1	2
Q	(Germany) Oliver Majdandžić	6	6
Q	(Greece) Odysseas Geladaris	2	6^{3}
(Hong Kong) Kai Thompson	6	7^{7}
WC	(Australia) Cooper Kose	7^{7}	4	5
14	(Spain) Tito Chávez	6^{2}	6	3^{r}
9	Savva Rybkin	7	7^{13}
(Poland) Jan Chłodnicki	5	6^{11}
(Japan) Hyu Kawanishi	6	7
(Turkey) Mustafa Ege Şık	4	5
WC	(Australia) Taiki Takizawa	6	6^{4}	6
(United States) Tanishk Konduri	3	7^{7}	3
(Thailand) Kunanan Pantaratorn	2	1
8	(Kazakhstan) Zangar Nurlanuly	6	6

Second round
(Romania) M Todoran	7	6
Q	(Germany) O Majdandžić	5	3
(Hong Kong) K Thompson	6	6
WC	(Australia) C Kose	4	2
9	S Rybkin	3	7	6
(Japan) H Kawanishi	6	5	2
WC	(Australia) T Takizawa	5	6	3
8	(Kazakhstan) Z Nurlanuly	7	1	6

Third round
(Romania) M Todoran	6^{11}	3
(Hong Kong) K Thompson	7^{13}	6
9	S Rybkin	1	4
8	(Kazakhstan) Z Nurlanuly	6	6

Quarterfinals
(Hong Kong) K Thompson	6	6^{4}	4
8	(Kazakhstan) Z Nurlanuly	3	7^{7}	6

==== Section 2 ====
First round
4	(United States) Keaton Hance	6	6
WC	(Australia) Ethan Domingo	0	2
(United Kingdom) Mark Ceban	6	6
(South Africa) Connor Doig	2	3
WC	(Australia) Lachlan King	5	3
(Colombia) Juan Miguel Bolívar Idárraga	7	6
(Italy) Simone Massellani	6	6
16	(Puerto Rico) Yannik Álvarez	0	3
11	(Chinese Taipei) Chen Kuan-shou	6	6
SE	(Brazil) Leonardo Storck França	4	3
(Australia) Jake Dembo	7^{7}	6
WC	(Japan) Ren Matsumura	6^{4}	2
(India) Arnav Vijay Paparkar	3	4
(United States) Vihaan Reddy	6	6
Q	(France) Aaron Gabet	4	1
6	(Ukraine) Nikita Bilozertsev	6	6

Second round
4	(United States) K Hance	6	4	6
(United Kingdom) M Ceban	4	6	2
(Colombia) JM Bolívar Idárraga	6	2	3
(Italy) S Massellani	2	6	6
11	(Chinese Taipei) K-s Chen	6	6
(Australia) J Dembo	2	3
(United States) V Reddy	6	1	4
6	(Ukraine) N Bilozertsev	4	6	6

Third round
4	(United States) K Hance	6	6
(Italy) S Massellani	0	4
11	(Chinese Taipei) K-s Chen	6	6
6	(Ukraine) N Bilozertsev	1	3

Quarterfinals
4	(United States) K Hance	7^{9}	6
11	(Chinese Taipei) K-s Chen	6^{7}	4

=== Bottom half ===
==== Section 3 ====
First round
5	(Germany) Jamie Mackenzie	6	6
(France) Mickael Kaouk	3	4
(South Africa) John Bothma	6	6
WC	(Australia) Raphael Savelli	1	3
(United States) Carel Aubriel Ngounoue	6	6
Q	(Turkey) Kaan Işık Koşaner	1	4
(Kazakhstan) Daniel Tazabekov	4	4
12	(Switzerland) Flynn Thomas	6	6
13	(United States) Jack Secord	6	6
WC	(Australia) Har Abir Sekhon	2	4
(Slovakia) Leon Sloboda	6	7^{7}
(Spain) Valentín González-Galiño	2	6^{0}
(Italy) Matteo Gribaldo	6^{8}	7	6
(Latvia) Rihards Neimanis	7^{10}	5	1
Kirill Filaretov	7	4	3
3	(Japan) Ryo Tabata	5	6	6

Second round
5	(Germany) J Mackenzie	6	7^{7}
(South Africa) J Bothma	4	6^{5}
(United States) CA Ngounoue	1	7	4
12	(Switzerland) F Thomas	6	5	6
13	(United States) J Secord	3	4
(Slovakia) L Sloboda	6	6
(Italy) M Gribaldo	3	2
3	(Japan) R Tabata	6	6

Third round
5	(Germany) J Mackenzie	7	6
12	(Switzerland) F Thomas	5	4
(Slovakia) L Sloboda	6^{1}	3
3	(Japan) R Tabata	7^{7}	6

Quarterfinals
5	(Germany) J Mackenzie	7^{7}	4	6^{7}
3	(Japan) R Tabata	6^{3}	6	7^{10}

==== Section 4 ====
First round
7	(Slovenia) Žiga Šeško	6	6
Q	Marat Salbiev	3	2
(United States) Ryan Cozad	5	6	1
(Ecuador) Emilio Camacho	7	4	6
Q	(Poland) Aleksander Błuś	6^{1}	5
(Kazakhstan) Damir Zhalgasbay	7^{7}	7
WC	(Australia) Ymerali Ibraimi	1	4
10	(Austria) Thilo Behrmann	6	6
15	(United States) Gavin Goode	6	1	6
(France) Daniel Jade	3	6	3
Q	(Botswana) Ntungamili Raguin	7	1	6
(Bulgaria) Dimitar Kisimov	5	6	4
(Australia) Daniel Jovanovski	6	7^{7}
Q	(China) Kang Kaigaoge	1	6^{5}
(Japan) Kanta Watanabe	4	3
2	(Brazil) Luís Guto Miguel	6	6

Second round
7	(Slovenia) Ž Šeško	6	6
(Ecuador) E Camacho	4	3
(Kazakhstan) D Zhalgasbay	3	6^{3}
10	(Austria) T Behrmann	6	7^{7}
15	(United States) G Goode	2	6	4
Q	(Botswana) N Raguin	6	3	6
(Australia) D Jovanovski	4	6^{3}
2	(Brazil) LG Miguel	6	7^{7}

Third round
7	(Slovenia) Ž Šeško	6	6
10	(Austria) T Behrmann	2	4
Q	(Botswana) N Raguin	4	3
2	(Brazil) LG Miguel	6	6

Quarterfinals
7	(Slovenia) Ž Šeško	6	7^{7}
2	(Brazil) LG Miguel	2	6^{5}

== Qualifying ==
=== Seeds ===
1. (Poland) Aleksander Błuś (qualified)
2. (South Korea) Cho Min-hyuk (first round)
3. (Germany) Oliver Majdandžić (qualified)
4. (France) Aaron Gabet (qualified)
5. Marat Salbiev (qualified)
6. (Canada) Dani Szabo (first round)
7. (Turkey) Kaan Işık Koşaner (qualified)
8. (Greece) Odysseas Geladaris (qualified)
9. (Italy) Raffaele Ciurnelli (qualifying competition)
10. (Turkey) Ramazan Kaan Oktay (qualifying competition)
11. (Japan) Eito Komada (qualifying competition)
12. (Botswana) Ntungamili Raguin (qualified)
13. (Poland) Jan Sadzik (first round)
14. (India) Samarth Sahita (qualifying competition)
15. (South Korea) Kim Tae-woo (qualifying competition)
16. (United States) Ford McCollum (first round)

=== Qualifiers ===
1. (Poland) Aleksander Błuś
2. (China) Kang Kaigaoge
3. (Germany) Oliver Majdandžić
4. (France) Aaron Gabet
5. Marat Salbiev
6. (Botswana) Ntungamili Raguin
7. (Turkey) Kaan Işık Koşaner
8. (Greece) Odysseas Geladaris

=== Draw ===
==== First qualifier ====
First round
1	(Poland) Aleksander Błuś	4	7^{7}	6
(Germany) Patrick-Valentin Moise	6	6^{3}	1
WC	(Australia) Isaac Wills	0	3
11	(Japan) Eito Komada	6	6

Qualifying competition
1	(Poland) Aleksander Błuś	6	6
11	(Japan) Eito Komada	4	2

==== Second qualifier ====
First round
2	(South Korea) Cho Min-hyuk	6^{4}	6	5
(China) Kang Kaigaoge	7^{7}	4	7
(New Zealand) Cody Atkinson	3	6	7
16	(United States) Ford McCollum	6	1	5

Qualifying competition
(China) Kang Kaigaoge	5	6	7^{14}
(New Zealand) Cody Atkinson	7	4	6^{12}

==== Third qualifier ====
First round
3	(Germany) Oliver Majdandžić	6	6
(South Korea) Kim Won-min	3	4
WC	(Australia) Kynan Enwright	4	6^{3}
14	(India) Samarth Sahita	6	7^{7}

Qualifying competition
3	(Germany) Oliver Majdandžić	2	6	6
14	(India) Samarth Sahita	6	2	3

==== Fourth qualifier ====
First round
4	(France) Aaron Gabet	6	6
(Australia) Sehun Park	2	0
(Japan) Yoshihiro Sakurai	1	1
15	(South Korea) Kim Tae-woo	6	6

Qualifying competition
4	(France) Aaron Gabet	6	6
15	(South Korea) Kim Tae-woo	2	0

==== Fifth qualifier ====
First round
5	Marat Salbiev	6	6
WC	(Australia) Jeremy Kipriz	0	0
(Poland) Szymon Karpiński	4	0
10	(Turkey) Ramazan Kaan Oktay	6	6

Qualifying competition
5	Marat Salbiev	1	7^{7}	7
10	(Turkey) Ramazan Kaan Oktay	6	6^{1}	5

==== Sixth qualifier ====
First round
6	(Canada) Dani Szabo	2	5
(Japan) Riku Nakamoto	6	7
(Australia) Elijah Dikkenberg	2	3
12	(Botswana) Ntungamili Raguin	6	6

Qualifying competition
(Japan) Riku Nakamoto	3	0
12	(Botswana) Ntungamili Raguin	6	6

==== Seventh qualifier ====
First round
7	(Turkey) Kaan Işık Koşaner	6	7
(Poland) Tymon Litwic	2	5
Alt	(Australia) Marcus Kipriz	0	0
9	(Italy) Raffaele Ciurnelli	6	6

Qualifying competition
7	(Turkey) Kaan Işık Koşaner	6	6
9	(Italy) Raffaele Ciurnelli	3	3

==== Eighth qualifier ====
First round
8	(Greece) Odysseas Geladaris	6	7^{7}
(Australia) Evan Vasiliadis	0	6^{2}
(Republic of Ireland) Eoghan Jennings	0	6	6
13	(Poland) Jan Sadzik	6	1	2

Qualifying competition
8	(Greece) Odysseas Geladaris	6	3	6
(Republic of Ireland) Eoghan Jennings	3	6	1
