= Zangar Nurlanuly =

Kazakhstani tennis player

- Native name: Зангар Нурланулы
- Country (sports): Kazakhstan
- Residence: Turkistan, Kazakhstan
- Born: 4 July 2008 (age 18) Almaty, Kazakhstan
- Height: 1.87 m (6 ft 2 in)
- Plays: Right-handed (two-handed backhand)
- Coach: Alexander Somogyi; Pavel Smela
- Prize money: US $20,134

Singles
- Career record: 0–0 (at ATP Tour level, Grand Slam level, and in Davis Cup)
- Career titles: 0
- Highest ranking: No. 1,308 (19 October 2026)
- Current ranking: No. 1,309 (26 October 2026)

Grand Slam singles results
- Australian Open Junior: SF (2026)
- French Open Junior: 3R (2026)
- Wimbledon Junior: 3R (2026)
- US Open Junior: SF (2025)

Doubles
- Career record: 0–0 (at ATP Tour level, Grand Slam level, and in Davis Cup)
- Career titles: 0
- Highest ranking: No. 1,631 (8 April 2025)

Grand Slam doubles results
- Australian Open Junior: 2R (2025)
- French Open Junior: 1R (2025, 2026)
- Wimbledon Junior: 2R (2025)
- US Open Junior: 2R (2025)
- Last updated on: 17 October 2026.

Zangar Nurlanuly (born 4 July 2008) is a Kazakh tennis player. He has a career-high ATP singles ranking of No. 1,308 on 19 October 2026 and a doubles ranking of No. 1,631 achieved on 8 April 2025.

Nurlanuly has a career-high ITF junior combined ranking of No. 7 achieved on 4 May 2026.

== Early life and training ==
Nurlanuly was born in Almaty, Kazakhstan. He started playing tennis as a child and had his father initially coach him. At the age of 12, he moved to Slovakia and joined the Dominika Cibulkova Academy, the academy associated with former world No. 4 Dominika Cibulková to continue his training and began competing regularly in European under-14 tournaments. Nurlanuly continued his schooling online and in a Kazakh school.

== Junior career ==
=== Early junior results ===
Nurlanuly began appearing in international junior tournaments at the age of 12. By 2022, he was No. 5 in the under-14 European Tennis rankings, while also competing at the top of the Junior Masters race. He also was part of Kazakhstan's under-14 boys team that reached the semifinals of the Junior World Tennis Cup with teammates Damir Zhalgasbay and Daniel Tazabekov.

=== 2025: US Open semifinal ===
In the 2025 US Open, Nurlanuly made it to the boys' singles semifinals. This result was the best junior Grand Slam singles performance by a male Kazakh player. He lost to Bulgaria's Ivan Ivanov, who went on to win the tournament.

=== 2026: Australian Open semifinal ===
At the 2026 Australian Open, Nurlanuly reached another boys' singles semifinal. In the quarterfinals, he defeated Hong Kong's Kai Thompson in a match that nearly lasted three hours. He lost in the semifinals, which resulted in him moving from No. 12 to No. 9 in the junior rankings, entering the junior top ten for the first time.

Later in 2026, he reached the third round at both the French Open and Wimbledon singles events.

== Professional career ==
As a wildcard entrant into the singles main draw at the 2026 Almaty Open, he was drawn against Tomáš Macháč of Czechia. He was also awarded a wildcard alongside Alexander Bublik into the doubles competition at the championships, where they were drawn against Australian pairing Adam Walton and Rinky Hijikata.

== Personal life ==
Nurlanuly has named Jannik Sinner as one of the players whose game he studies. He has practised with Jannik Sinner, Elena Rybakina, Alexander Bublik and Fábián Marozsán. Outside tennis, he has expressed an interest in football and chess.
