= 2026 Australian Open – Mixed doubles =

Tennis championship

Mixed doubles
- 2026 Australian Open

Final
- Champions: (Australia) Olivia Gadecki (Australia) John Peers
- Runners-up: (France) Kristina Mladenovic (France) Manuel Guinard
- Score: 4–6, 6–3, [10–8]
- Date: 30 January 2026

Details
- Draw: 32
- Seeds: 8

Events
Singles	men	women		boys	girls
Doubles	men	women	mixed	boys	girls
WC Singles	men	women	quad	boys	girls
WC Doubles	men	women	quad	boys	girls
- Australian Open

Defending champions Olivia Gadecki and John Peers defeated Kristina Mladenovic and Manuel Guinard in the final, 4–6, 6-3, [10–8] to win the mixed doubles tennis title at the 2026 Australian Open. They were the second pair in the Open Era to successfully defend the Australian Open mixed doubles title, after Jana Novotná and Jim Pugh in 1989.

Desirae Krawczyk was vying to complete the Career Grand Slam in mixed doubles, but she and her partner Neal Skupski lost in the first round to Leylah Fernandez and Nick Kyrgios.

== Seeds ==
1. (Italy) Sara Errani / (Italy) Andrea Vavassori (first round)
2. (Brazil) Luisa Stefani / (El Salvador) Marcelo Arévalo (semifinals)
3. (Netherlands) Demi Schuurs / (United Kingdom) Julian Cash (second round)
4. (United States) Taylor Townsend / (Croatia) Nikola Mektić (semifinals)
5. (Serbia) Aleksandra Krunić / (Croatia) Mate Pavić (quarterfinals)
6. (China) Zhang Shuai / (Germany) Tim Pütz (second round)
7. (United Kingdom) Olivia Nicholls / (United Kingdom) Henry Patten (first round)
8. (Slovakia) Tereza Mihalíková / (United Kingdom) Lloyd Glasspool (second round)

== Draw ==
Key

- Q = Qualifier
- WC = Wild card
- LL = Lucky loser
- Alt = Alternate
- ITF = ITF entry
- PR = Protected ranking
- SR = Special ranking
- SE = Special exempt
- JE = Junior exempt
- JR = Junior Accelerator Programme entrant
- CO = College Accelerator Programme entrant
- NG = Next Gen Accelerator Program entrant
- w/o = Walkover
- r = Retired
- d = Defaulted

=== Finals ===
Semifinals
WC	(Australia) Olivia Gadecki (Australia) John Peers	7^{7}	2	[13]
4	(United States) Taylor Townsend (Croatia) Nikola Mektić	6^{2}	6	[11]
PR	(France) Kristina Mladenovic (France) Manuel Guinard	6	3	[10]
2	(Brazil) Luisa Stefani (El Salvador) Marcelo Arévalo	2	6	[7]

Final
WC	(Australia) Olivia Gadecki (Australia) John Peers	4	6	[10]
PR	(France) Kristina Mladenovic (France) Manuel Guinard	6	3	[8]

=== Top half ===
First round
1	(Italy) S Errani (Italy) A Vavassori	4	2
(Germany) L Siegemund (France) É Roger-Vasselin	6	6
WC	(Australia) O Gadecki (Australia) J Peers	6	6
PR	V Zvonareva (Austria) L Miedler	3	2
(Canada) G Dabrowski (United Kingdom) L Johnson	2	7^{7}	[7]
WC	(Australia) M Joint (Australia) M Romios	6	6^{2}	[10]
WC	(Australia) T Gibson (Australia) M Ebden	6^{2}	6	[6]
5	(Serbia) A Krunić (Croatia) M Pavić	7^{7}	0	[10]
4	(United States) T Townsend (Croatia) N Mektić	6	2	[10]
(Hungary) F Stollár (Germany) K Krawietz	1	6	[6]
(Australia) S Hunter (Monaco) H Nys	1	6	[10]
(Australia) E Perez (Portugal) F Cabral	6	3	[4]
I Khromacheva (United States) C Harrison	6	7^{7}
(Chinese Taipei) S-w Hsieh (Poland) J Zieliński	4	6^{5}
WC	(Australia) M Inglis (Australia) J Kubler	4	1
8	(Slovakia) T Mihalíková (United Kingdom) L Glasspool	6	6

Second round
(Germany) L Siegemund (France) É Roger-Vasselin	3	6	[5]
WC	(Australia) O Gadecki (Australia) J Peers	6	3	[10]
WC	(Australia) M Joint (Australia) M Romios	4	3
5	(Serbia) A Krunić (Croatia) M Pavić	6	6
4	(United States) T Townsend (Croatia) N Mektić	6	2	[10]
(Australia) S Hunter (Monaco) H Nys	3	6	[8]
I Khromacheva (United States) C Harrison	4	7	[10]
8	(Slovakia) T Mihalíková (United Kingdom) L Glasspool	6	5	[7]

Quarterfinals
WC	(Australia) O Gadecki (Australia) J Peers	6	7^{8}
5	(Serbia) A Krunić (Croatia) M Pavić	1	6^{6}
4	(United States) T Townsend (Croatia) N Mektić	6	6
I Khromacheva (United States) C Harrison	4	2

Semifinals
WC	(Australia) O Gadecki (Australia) J Peers	7^{7}	2	[13]
4	(United States) T Townsend (Croatia) N Mektić	6^{2}	6	[11]

=== Bottom half ===
First round
6	(China) S Zhang (Germany) T Pütz	6	7^{7}
(United States) N Melichar-Martinez (India) Y Bhambri	4	6^{3}
A Panova (Netherlands) D Pel	6	2	[2]
(Czech Republic) K Siniaková (Netherlands) S Verbeek	3	6	[10]
(New Zealand) E Routliffe (Sweden) A Göransson	4	5
PR	(France) K Mladenovic (France) M Guinard	6	7
WC	(Australia) K Birrell (Australia) J-P Smith	3	4
3	(Netherlands) D Schuurs (United Kingdom) J Cash	6	6
7	(United Kingdom) O Nicholls (United Kingdom) H Patten	2	3
(Kazakhstan) A Danilina (United States) JJ Tracy	6	6
(United States) D Krawczyk (United Kingdom) N Skupski	7^{8}	4	[10]
WC	(Canada) L Fernandez (Australia) N Kyrgios	6^{6}	6	[12]
(United States) A Muhammad (United States) E King	6	3	[10]
WC	(Australia) G Da Silva-Fick (Australia) B Bayldon	3	6	[6]
WC	(Australia) T Preston (Australia) C Hewitt	2	3
2	(Brazil) L Stefani (El Salvador) M Arévalo	6	6

Second round
6	(China) S Zhang (Germany) T Pütz	6	2	[8]
(Czech Republic) K Siniaková (Netherlands) S Verbeek	4	6	[10]
PR	(France) K Mladenovic (France) M Guinard	7^{7}	5	[10]
3	(Netherlands) D Schuurs (United Kingdom) J Cash	6^{3}	7	[2]
(Kazakhstan) A Danilina (United States) JJ Tracy	6	6
WC	(Canada) L Fernandez (Australia) N Kyrgios	3	1
(United States) A Muhammad (United States) E King	3	2
2	(Brazil) L Stefani (El Salvador) M Arévalo	6	6

Quarterfinals
(Czech Republic) K Siniaková (Netherlands) S Verbeek	6^{2}	6	[8]
PR	(France) K Mladenovic (France) M Guinard	7^{7}	3	[10]
(Kazakhstan) A Danilina (United States) JJ Tracy	6	4	[7]
2	(Brazil) L Stefani (El Salvador) M Arévalo	2	6	[10]

Semifinals
PR	(France) K Mladenovic (France) M Guinard	6	3	[10]
2	(Brazil) L Stefani (El Salvador) M Arévalo	2	6	[7]

== Other entry information ==
=== Wildcards ===
- (Australia) Kimberly Birrell / (Australia) John-Patrick Smith
- (Australia) Gabriella Da Silva-Fick / (Australia) Blake Bayldon
- (Canada) Leylah Fernandez / (Australia) Nick Kyrgios
- (Australia) Olivia Gadecki / (Australia) John Peers
- (Australia) Talia Gibson / (Australia) Matthew Ebden
- (Australia) Maddison Inglis / (Australia) Jason Kubler
- (Australia) Maya Joint / (Australia) Matthew Romios
- (Australia) Taylah Preston / (Australia) Cruz Hewitt

=== Protected ranking ===
- (France) Kristina Mladenovic / (France) Manuel Guinard
- Vera Zvonareva / (Austria) Lucas Miedler
