= 2026 Australian Open – Wheelchair women's singles =

Tennis championship

Wheelchair women's singles
- 2026 Australian Open
- Final date: 31 January 2026

Final
- Champion: (China) Li Xiaohui
- Runner-up: (Netherlands) Diede de Groot
- Score: 6–1, 6–2

Details
- Draw: 16
- Seeds: 4

Events
Singles	men	women		boys	girls
Doubles	men	women	mixed	boys	girls
WC Singles	men	women	quad	boys	girls
WC Doubles	men	women	quad	boys	girls
- Australian Open

Li Xiaohui defeated Diede de Groot in the final, 6–1, 6–2 to win the women's singles wheelchair tennis title at the 2026 Australian Open. It was her first major singles title.

Yui Kamiji was the defending champion, but lost to Li in the semifinals.

== Seeds ==
1. (Japan) Yui Kamiji (semifinals)
2. (Netherlands) Aniek van Koot (quarterfinals)
3. (China) Li Xiaohui (champion)
4. (China) Wang Ziying (semifinals)

== Draw ==
Key

- Q = Qualifier
- WC = Wild card
- LL = Lucky loser
- Alt = Alternate
- ITF = ITF entry
- PR = Protected ranking
- SR = Special ranking
- SE = Special exempt
- JE = Junior exempt
- JR = Junior Accelerator Programme entrant
- CO = College Accelerator Programme entrant
- NG = Next Gen Accelerator Program entrant
- w/o = Walkover
- r = Retired
- d = Defaulted

=== Draw ===
First round
1	(Japan) Yui Kamiji	6	6
(Netherlands) Jiske Griffioen	2	2
(China) Zhu Zhenzhen	1	7^{7}	4
(Netherlands) Lizzy de Greef	6	6^{3}	6
3	(China) Li Xiaohui	6	3	6
(France) Ksénia Chasteau	2	6	1
Q	(Japan) Momoko Ohtani	6	7
(Japan) Manami Tanaka	3	5
(Colombia) Angélica Bernal	5	4
(South Africa) Kgothatso Montjane	7	6
WC	(China) Guo Luoyao	3	4
4	(China) Wang Ziying	6	6
(Netherlands) Diede de Groot	6	6
WC	(Netherlands) Jinte Bos	0	3
Q	(Israel) Maayan Zikri	0	2
2	(Netherlands) Aniek van Koot	6	6

Quarterfinals
1	(Japan) Y Kamiji	6	6
(Netherlands) L de Greef	1	2
3	(China) X Li	6	6
Q	(Japan) M Ohtani	3	2
(South Africa) K Montjane	4	2
4	(China) Z Wang	6	6
(Netherlands) D de Groot	6	6
2	(Netherlands) A van Koot	2	2

Semifinals
1	(Japan) Y Kamiji	6	2	6^{8}
3	(China) X Li	3	6	7^{10}
4	(China) Z Wang	4	6	6^{9}
(Netherlands) D de Groot	6	3	7^{11}

Final
3	(China) X Li	6	6
(Netherlands) D de Groot	1	2

== Qualifying ==
=== Seeds ===
1. (Japan) Saki Takamuro (qualifying competition)
2. (United Kingdom) Lucy Shuker (qualifying competition)

=== Qualifiers ===
1. (Japan) Momoko Ohtani
2. (Israel) Maayan Zikri

=== Qualifying draw ===
Qualifying competition
1	(Japan) Saki Takamuro	5	3
(Japan) Momoko Ohtani	7	6
Qualifying competition
(Israel) Maayan Zikri	2	6	7
2	(United Kingdom) Lucy Shuker	6	3	5
