= 2026 Australian Open – Wheelchair quad singles =

Tennis championship

Wheelchair quad singles
- 2026 Australian Open

Final
- Champion: (Netherlands) Niels Vink
- Runner-up: (Netherlands) Sam Schröder
- Score: 6–3, 7–6^{(7–5)}
- Date: 31 January 2026

Details
- Draw: 16
- Seeds: 4

Events
Singles	men	women		boys	girls
Doubles	men	women	mixed	boys	girls
WC Singles	men	women	quad	boys	girls
WC Doubles	men	women	quad	boys	girls
- Australian Open

Niels Vink defeating four-time defending champion Sam Schröder in a rematch of the previous year's final, 6–3, 7–6^{(7–5)} to win the quad singles wheelchair tennis title at the 2026 Australian Open. It was his first Australian Open singles title and eighth major singles title overall, completing the career Golden Slam.

== Seeds ==
1. (Netherlands) Niels Vink (champion)
2. (Netherlands) Sam Schröder (final)
3. (Israel) Guy Sasson (semifinals)
4. (Turkey) Ahmet Kaplan (semifinals)

== Draw ==
Key

- Q = Qualifier
- WC = Wild card
- LL = Lucky loser
- Alt = Alternate
- ITF = ITF entry
- PR = Protected ranking
- SR = Special ranking
- SE = Special exempt
- JE = Junior exempt
- JR = Junior Accelerator Programme entrant
- CO = College Accelerator Programme entrant
- NG = Next Gen Accelerator Program entrant
- w/o = Walkover
- r = Retired
- d = Defaulted

=== Draw ===
First round
1	(Netherlands) Niels Vink	6	6
WC	(Australia) Finn Broadbent	0	1
(Argentina) Gonzalo Enrique Lazarte	6	7^{7}
(Chile) Francisco Cayulef	4	6^{4}
3	(Israel) Guy Sasson	6	6
(South Africa) Donald Ramphadi	2	2
(Australia) Benjamin Wenzel	6	2	2
(Australia) Heath Davidson	1	6	6
(United Kingdom) Gregory Slade	1	3
Q	(Brazil) Leandro Pena	6	6
(United Kingdom) Andy Lapthorne	4	5
4	(Turkey) Ahmet Kaplan	6	7
(Australia) Jin Woodman	6	6
Q	(Brazil) Ymanitu Silva	1	2
(Canada) Robert Shaw	1	2
2	(Netherlands) Sam Schröder	6	6

Quarterfinals
1	(Netherlands) N Vink	6	6
(Argentina) GE Lazarte	0	1
3	(Israel) G Sasson	6	6
(Australia) H Davidson	0	0
Q	(Brazil) L Pena	6^{0}	2
4	(Turkey) A Kaplan	7^{7}	6
(Australia) J Woodman	5	0
2	(Netherlands) S Schröder	7	6

Semifinals
1	(Netherlands) N Vink	6	6
3	(Israel) G Sasson	1	1
4	(Turkey) A Kaplan	1	4
2	(Netherlands) S Schröder	6	6

Final
1	(Netherlands) N Vink	6	7^{7}
2	(Netherlands) S Schröder	3	6^{5}

== Qualifying ==
=== Seeds ===
1. (Brazil) Leandro Pena (qualified)
2. (Brazil) Ymanitu Silva (qualified)

=== Qualifiers ===
1. (Brazil) Leandro Pena
2. (Brazil) Ymanitu Silva

=== Qualifying draw ===
Qualifying competition
1	(Brazil) Leandro Pena	6	6
(United States) Andrew Bogdanov	0	1
Qualifying competition
(Colombia) Daniel Alejandro Campaz Escobar	2	4
2	(Brazil) Ymanitu Silva	6	6
