= 2026 Australian Open – Wheelchair boys' doubles =

Tennis championship

Wheelchair boys' doubles
- 2026 Australian Open

Final
- Champions: (United Kingdom) Lucas John De Gouveia (Belgium) Alexander Lantermann
- Runners-up: (United Kingdom) Matthew Knoesen (Australia) Arlo Shawcross
- Score: 6–2, 6–3
- Date: 30 January 2026

Details
- Draw: 2

Events
Singles	men	women		boys	girls
Doubles	men	women	mixed	boys	girls
WC Singles	men	women	quad	boys	girls
WC Doubles	men	women	quad	boys	girls
- Australian Open

The 2026 Australian Open – Wheelchair boys' doubles was the second edition of the junior wheelchair tournament at the first Grand Slam of the season.

Luiz Calixto and Charlie Cooper won the inaugural event in 2025 but were no longer eligible for the junior wheelchair category and could not, therefore, defend their title

Lucas John De Gouveia and Alexander Lantermann defeated Matthew Knoesen Arlo Shawcross in the final 6–2, 6–3.

== Draw ==
Key

- Q = Qualifier
- WC = Wild card
- LL = Lucky loser
- Alt = Alternate
- ITF = ITF entry
- PR = Protected ranking
- SR = Special ranking
- SE = Special exempt
- JE = Junior exempt
- JR = Junior Accelerator Programme entrant
- CO = College Accelerator Programme entrant
- NG = Next Gen Accelerator Program entrant
- w/o = Walkover
- r = Retired
- d = Defaulted

Final
(United Kingdom) Matthew Knoesen (Australia) Arlo Shawcross	2	3
(United Kingdom) Lucas John De Gouveia (Belgium) Alexander Lantermann	6	6
