= 2026 Australian Open – Wheelchair women's doubles =

Tennis championship

Wheelchair women's doubles
- 2026 Australian Open
- Final date: 30 January 2026

Final
- Champions: (China) Li Xiaohui (China) Wang Ziying
- Runners-up: (Japan) Yui Kamiji (China) Zhu Zhenzhen
- Score: 6–4, 6–3

Details
- Draw: 8
- Seeds: 2

Events
Singles	men	women		boys	girls
Doubles	men	women	mixed	boys	girls
WC Singles	men	women	quad	boys	girls
WC Doubles	men	women	quad	boys	girls
- Australian Open

Defending champions Li Xiaohui and Wang Ziying defeated Yui Kamiji and Zhu Zhenzhen in the final, 6–4, 6–3 to win the women's doubles wheelchair tennis title at the 2026 Australian Open.

== Seeds ==
1. (China) Li Xiaohui / (China) Wang Ziying (champions)
2. (Japan) Yui Kamiji / (China) Zhu Zhenzhen (final)

== Draw ==
Key

- Q = Qualifier
- WC = Wild card
- LL = Lucky loser
- Alt = Alternate
- ITF = ITF entry
- PR = Protected ranking
- SR = Special ranking
- SE = Special exempt
- JE = Junior exempt
- JR = Junior Accelerator Programme entrant
- CO = College Accelerator Programme entrant
- NG = Next Gen Accelerator Program entrant
- w/o = Walkover
- r = Retired
- d = Defaulted

=== Draw ===
Quarterfinals
1	(China) Li Xiaohui (China) Wang Ziying	6	6
(Japan) Momoko Ohtani (Israel) Maayan Zikri	2	3
(Colombia) Angélica Bernal (France) Ksénia Chasteau	6	4	[3]
(South Africa) Kgothatso Montjane (Japan) Manami Tanaka	4	6	[10]
(Netherlands) Diede de Groot (Netherlands) Aniek van Koot	6	6
(Netherlands) Jiske Griffioen (China) Guo Luoyao	1	2
(Netherlands) Jinte Bos (Netherlands) Lizzy de Greef	1	0
2	(Japan) Yui Kamiji (China) Zhu Zhenzhen	6	6

Semifinals
1	(China) X Li (China) Z Wang	6	6
(South Africa) K Montjane (Japan) M Tanaka	2	3
(Netherlands) D de Groot (Netherlands) A van Koot	3	0
2	(Japan) Y Kamiji (China) Z Zhu	6	6

Final
1	(China) X Li (China) Z Wang	6	6
2	(Japan) Y Kamiji (China) Z Zhu	4	3
