= 2026 Australian Open – Wheelchair girls' singles =

Tennis championship

Wheelchair girls' singles
- 2026 Australian Open
- Final date: 31 January 2026

Final
- Champion: (Belgium) Luna Gryp
- Runner-up: (Japan) Seira Matsuoka
- Score: 6–4, 6–4

Details
- Draw: 4
- Seeds: 2

Events
Singles	men	women		boys	girls
Doubles	men	women	mixed	boys	girls
WC Singles	men	women	quad	boys	girls
WC Doubles	men	women	quad	boys	girls
- Australian Open

The 2026 Australian Open – Wheelchair Girls' Singles was the second edition of the junior wheelchair tournament at the first Grand Slam of the season.

Vitória Miranda was the reigning champion, but was no longer eligible to participate in junior events.

Luna Gryp defeated Seira Matsuoka in the final 6–4, 6–4.

== Format ==
The tournament followed a round robin format, with the two best players reaching the final. The event featured some of the most promising young wheelchair tennis players, ensuring a high level of competition.

== Seeds ==
1. (Belgium) Luna Gryp (champion)
2. (Japan) Seira Matsuoka (final)

== Draw ==
Key

- Q = Qualifier
- WC = Wild card
- LL = Lucky loser
- Alt = Alternate
- ITF = ITF entry
- PR = Protected ranking
- SR = Special ranking
- SE = Special exempt
- JE = Junior exempt
- JR = Junior Accelerator Programme entrant
- CO = College Accelerator Programme entrant
- NG = Next Gen Accelerator Program entrant
- w/o = Walkover
- r = Retired
- d = Defaulted

=== Final ===
Final
1	(Belgium) Luna Gryp	6	6
2	(Japan) Seira Matsuoka	4	4
