= 2026 Australian Open – Wheelchair girls' doubles =

Tennis championship

Wheelchair girls' doubles
- 2026 Australian Open

Final
- Champions: (United Kingdom) Lucy Foyster (Japan) Seira Matsuoka
- Runners-up: (Belgium) Luna Gryp (United States) Lucy Heald
- Score: 6–3, 7–5
- Date: 30 January 2026

Details
- Draw: 2
- Seeds: 2

Events
Singles	men	women		boys	girls
Doubles	men	women	mixed	boys	girls
WC Singles	men	women	quad	boys	girls
WC Doubles	men	women	quad	boys	girls
- Australian Open

The 2026 Australian Open – Wheelchair girls' doubles was the second edition of the junior wheelchair tournament at the first Grand Slam of the season.

Luna Gryp and Vitória Miranda won the inaugural event in 2025. Vitória Miranda was no longer eligible for the junior wheelchair category and could not, therefore, defend her title. Luna Gryp has teamed up with American Lucy Heald for this tournament.

Lucy Foyster and Seira Matsuoka defeated Luna Gryp and Lucy Heald in the final 6–3, 7–5.

== Seeds ==
1. (Belgium) Luna Gryp / (United States) Lucy Heald (final)
2. (United Kingdom) Lucy Foyster / (Japan) Seira Matsuoka (champions)

== Draw ==
Key

- Q = Qualifier
- WC = Wild card
- LL = Lucky loser
- Alt = Alternate
- ITF = ITF entry
- PR = Protected ranking
- SR = Special ranking
- SE = Special exempt
- JE = Junior exempt
- JR = Junior Accelerator Programme entrant
- CO = College Accelerator Programme entrant
- NG = Next Gen Accelerator Program entrant
- w/o = Walkover
- r = Retired
- d = Defaulted

Final
1	(Belgium) Luna Gryp (United States) Lucy Heald	3	5
2	(United Kingdom) Lucy Foyster (Japan) Seira Matsuoka	6	7
