= 2026 Australian Open – Wheelchair men's doubles =

Tennis championship

Wheelchair men's doubles
- 2026 Australian Open

Final
- Champions: (Argentina) Gustavo Fernández (Japan) Tokito Oda
- Runners-up: (Spain) Daniel Caverzaschi (Netherlands) Ruben Spaargaren
- Score: 6–2, 6–1
- Date: 30 January 2026

Details
- Draw: 8
- Seeds: 2

Events
Singles	men	women		boys	girls
Doubles	men	women	mixed	boys	girls
WC Singles	men	women	quad	boys	girls
WC Doubles	men	women	quad	boys	girls
- Australian Open

Gustavo Fernández and Tokito Oda defeated Daniel Caverzaschi and Ruben Spaargaren in the final, 6–2, 6–1 to win the men's doubles wheelchair tennis title at the 2026 Australian Open. With the win, Fernández completed the career Grand Slam in doubles.

Alfie Hewett and Gordon Reid were the six-time defending champions, but lost in the semifinals to Fernández and Oda.

== Seeds ==
1. (Spain) Daniel Caverzaschi / (Netherlands) Ruben Spaargaren (final)
2. (Spain) Martín de la Puente / (France) Stéphane Houdet (quarterfinals)

== Draw ==
Key

- Q = Qualifier
- WC = Wild card
- LL = Lucky loser
- Alt = Alternate
- ITF = ITF entry
- PR = Protected ranking
- SR = Special ranking
- SE = Special exempt
- JE = Junior exempt
- JR = Junior Accelerator Programme entrant
- CO = College Accelerator Programme entrant
- NG = Next Gen Accelerator Program entrant
- w/o = Walkover
- r = Retired
- d = Defaulted

=== Draw ===
Quarterfinals
1	(Spain) Daniel Caverzaschi (Netherlands) Ruben Spaargaren	6^{4}	6	[10]
(Chile) Alexander Cataldo (Australia) Anderson Parker	7^{7}	2	[6]
(United States) Casey Ratzlaff (Brazil) Daniel Rodrigues	3	7^{8}	[11]
(China) Ji Zhenxu (Israel) Sergei Lysov	6	6^{6}	[9]
(Netherlands) Tom Egberink (Japan) Takuya Miki	0	4
(United Kingdom) Alfie Hewett (United Kingdom) Gordon Reid	6	6
(Argentina) Gustavo Fernández (Japan) Tokito Oda	6	5	[10]
2	(Spain) Martín de la Puente (France) Stéphane Houdet	2	7	[6]

Semifinals
1	(Spain) D Caverzaschi (Netherlands) R Spaargaren	6	6
(United States) C Ratzlaff (Brazil) D Rodrigues	0	2
(United Kingdom) A Hewett (United Kingdom) G Reid	4	6	[4]
(Argentina) G Fernández (Japan) T Oda	6	2	[10]

Final
1	(Spain) D Caverzaschi (Netherlands) R Spaargaren	2	1
(Argentina) G Fernández (Japan) T Oda	6	6
