= 2026 Australian Open – Wheelchair boys' singles =

Tennis championship

Wheelchair boys' singles
- 2026 Australian Open

Final
- Champion: (Belgium) Alexander Lantermann
- Runner-up: (United Kingdom) Matthew Knoesen
- Score: 6–0, 6–2
- Date: 31 January 2026

Details
- Draw: 4
- Seeds: 2

Events
Singles	men	women		boys	girls
Doubles	men	women	mixed	boys	girls
WC Singles	men	women	quad	boys	girls
WC Doubles	men	women	quad	boys	girls
- Australian Open

The 2026 Australian Open – Wheelchair Boys' Singles was the second edition of the junior wheelchair tournament at the first Grand Slam of the season.

Charlie Cooper was the reigning champion, but was no longer eligible to participate in junior events.

Alexander Lantermann defeated Matthew Knoesen in the final 6–0, 6–2.

== Seeds ==
1. (Belgium) Alexander Lantermann (champion)
2. (United Kingdom) Lucas John De Gouveia (round robin)

== Format ==
The tournament followed a round robin format, with the two best players reaching the final. The event featured some of the most promising young wheelchair tennis players, ensuring a high level of competition.

== Draw ==
Key

- Q = Qualifier
- WC = Wild card
- LL = Lucky loser
- Alt = Alternate
- ITF = ITF entry
- PR = Protected ranking
- SR = Special ranking
- SE = Special exempt
- JE = Junior exempt
- JR = Junior Accelerator Programme entrant
- CO = College Accelerator Programme entrant
- NG = Next Gen Accelerator Program entrant
- w/o = Walkover
- r = Retired
- d = Defaulted

=== Final ===
Final
	(United Kingdom) Matthew Knoesen	0	2
1	(Belgium) Alexander Lantermann	6	6
