= 2026 Australian Open – Wheelchair men's singles =

Tennis championship

Wheelchair men's singles
- 2026 Australian Open

Final
- Champion: (Japan) Tokito Oda
- Runner-up: (Spain) Martín de la Puente
- Score: 3–6, 6–2, 6–2
- Date: 31 January 2026

Details
- Draw: 16
- Seeds: 4

Events
Singles	men	women		boys	girls
Doubles	men	women	mixed	boys	girls
WC Singles	men	women	quad	boys	girls
WC Doubles	men	women	quad	boys	girls
- Australian Open

Tokito Oda defeated Martín de la Puente in the final, 3–6, 6–2, 6–2 to win the men's singles wheelchair tennis title at the 2026 Australian Open. It was his second Australian Open singles title and eighth major singles title overall, completing a non-calendar-year Grand Slam.

Alfie Hewett was the defending champion, but lost in the semifinals to de la Puente.

== Seeds ==
1. (United Kingdom) Alfie Hewett (semifinals)
2. (Japan) Tokito Oda (champion)
3. (Spain) Martín de la Puente (final)
4. (Argentina) Gustavo Fernández (semifinals)

== Draw ==
Key

- Q = Qualifier
- WC = Wild card
- LL = Lucky loser
- Alt = Alternate
- ITF = ITF entry
- PR = Protected ranking
- SR = Special ranking
- SE = Special exempt
- JE = Junior exempt
- JR = Junior Accelerator Programme entrant
- CO = College Accelerator Programme entrant
- NG = Next Gen Accelerator Program entrant
- w/o = Walkover
- r = Retired
- d = Defaulted

=== Draw ===
First round
1	(United Kingdom) Alfie Hewett	6	6
(Japan) Takuya Miki	2	1
WC	(Australia) Anderson Parker	3	2
(United Kingdom) Gordon Reid	6	6
3	(Spain) Martín de la Puente	7	6
(Netherlands) Ruben Spaargaren	5	4
(France) Stéphane Houdet	7	4	7
Q	(Brazil) Daniel Rodrigues	5	6	5
(Israel) Sergei Lysov	5	6	6
(China) Ji Zhenxu	7	2	2
Q	(Chile) Alexander Cataldo	2	3
4	(Argentina) Gustavo Fernández	6	6
(Spain) Daniel Caverzaschi	4	4
(Netherlands) Tom Egberink	6	6
(United States) Casey Ratzlaff	3	3
2	(Japan) Tokito Oda	6	6

Quarterfinals
1	(United Kingdom) A Hewett	6	6
(United Kingdom) G Reid	2	3
3	(Spain) M de la Puente	6	6
(France) S Houdet	3	2
(Israel) S Lysov	1	2
4	(Argentina) G Fernández	6	6
(Netherlands) T Egberink	4	4
2	(Japan) T Oda	6	6

Semifinals
1	(United Kingdom) A Hewett	4	4
3	(Spain) M de la Puente	6	6
4	(Argentina) G Fernández	1	6^{2}
2	(Japan) T Oda	6	7^{7}

Final
3	(Spain) M de la Puente	6	2	2
2	(Japan) T Oda	3	6	6

== Qualifying ==
=== Seeds ===
1. (Brazil) Daniel Rodrigues (qualified)
2. (Netherlands) Maarten ter Hofte (qualifying competition)

=== Qualifiers ===
1. (Brazil) Daniel Rodrigues
2. (Chile) Alexander Cataldo

=== Qualifying draw ===
Qualifying competition
1	(Brazil) Daniel Rodrigues	6	6
(Japan) Daisuke Arai	4	3
Qualifying competition
(Chile) Alexander Cataldo	6	6
2	(Netherlands) Maarten ter Hofte	2	4
