= 2026 Australian Open – Wheelchair quad doubles =

Tennis championship

Wheelchair quad doubles
- 2026 Australian Open

Final
- Champions: (Israel) Guy Sasson (Netherlands) Niels Vink
- Runners-up: (Australia) Heath Davidson (United Kingdom) Andy Lapthorne
- Score: 6–3, 6–1
- Date: 30 January 2026

Details
- Draw: 8
- Seeds: 2

Events
Singles	men	women		boys	girls
Doubles	men	women	mixed	boys	girls
WC Singles	men	women	quad	boys	girls
WC Doubles	men	women	quad	boys	girls
- Australian Open

Guy Sasson and Niels Vink defeated defending champion Andy Lapthorne and his partner Heath Davidson in the final, 6–3, 6–1 to win the quad doubles wheelchair tennis title at the 2026 Australian Open.

Lapthorne and Sam Schröder were the reigning champions, but chose not to compete together this year. Schröder partnered Ahmet Kaplan, but lost in the first round to Sasson and Vink.

== Seeds ==
1. (Israel) Guy Sasson / (Netherlands) Niels Vink (champions)
2. (Australia) Heath Davidson / (United Kingdom) Andy Lapthorne (final)

== Draw ==
Key

- Q = Qualifier
- WC = Wild card
- LL = Lucky loser
- Alt = Alternate
- ITF = ITF entry
- PR = Protected ranking
- SR = Special ranking
- SE = Special exempt
- JE = Junior exempt
- JR = Junior Accelerator Programme entrant
- CO = College Accelerator Programme entrant
- NG = Next Gen Accelerator Program entrant
- w/o = Walkover
- r = Retired
- d = Defaulted

=== Draw ===
Quarterfinals
1	(Israel) Guy Sasson (Netherlands) Niels Vink	7^{8}	6
(Turkey) Ahmet Kaplan (Netherlands) Sam Schröder	6^{6}	0
(United Kingdom) Gregory Slade (Australia) Benjamin Wenzel	3	6	[5]
(Canada) Robert Shaw (Brazil) Ymanitu Silva	6	1	[10]
(Australia) Finn Broadbent (Brazil) Leandro Pena	4	2
(South Africa) Donald Ramphadi (Australia) Jin Woodman	6	6
(Chile) Francisco Cayulef (Argentina) Gonzalo Enrique Lazarte	6^{1}	4
2	(Australia) Heath Davidson (United Kingdom) Andy Lapthorne	7^{7}	6

Semifinals
1	(Israel) G Sasson (Netherlands) N Vink	6	6
(Canada) R Shaw (Brazil) Y Silva	4	3
(South Africa) D Ramphadi (Australia) J Woodman	6	6^{8}	[6]
2	(Australia) H Davidson (United Kingdom) A Lapthorne	4	7^{10}	[10]

Final
1	(Israel) G Sasson (Netherlands) N Vink	6	6
2	(Australia) H Davidson (United Kingdom) A Lapthorne	3	1
