= 2026 Australian Open – Men's doubles =

Tennis championship

Men's doubles
- 2026 Australian Open

Final
- Champions: (United States) Christian Harrison (United Kingdom) Neal Skupski
- Runners-up: (Australia) Jason Kubler (Australia) Marc Polmans
- Score: 7–6^{(7–4)}, 6–4
- Date: 31 January 2026

Details
- Draw: 64
- Seeds: 16

Events
Singles	men	women		boys	girls
Doubles	men	women	mixed	boys	girls
WC Singles	men	women	quad	boys	girls
WC Doubles	men	women	quad	boys	girls
- Australian Open

Christian Harrison and Neal Skupski defeated Jason Kubler and Marc Polmans in the final, 7–6^{(7–4)}, 6–4 to win the men's doubles tennis title at the 2026 Australian Open. It was Harrison's first major title, and Skupski's second major men's doubles title and fourth overall.

Harri Heliövaara and Henry Patten were the defending champions, but lost in the third round to Petr Nouza and Patrik Rikl.

Skupski regained the ATP No. 1 doubles ranking by winning the title. Lloyd Glasspool, Horacio Zeballos, and the pair of Marcelo Arévalo and Mate Pavić were also in contention at the beginning of the tournament.

Jean-Julien Rojer was vying to complete the career Grand Slam, but he and his partner Marcelo Demoliner lost to Robert Cash and JJ Tracy in the second round.

== Seeds ==
1. (United Kingdom) Julian Cash / (United Kingdom) Lloyd Glasspool (second round)
2. (Finland) Harri Heliövaara / (United Kingdom) Henry Patten (third round)
3. (Spain) Marcel Granollers / (Argentina) Horacio Zeballos (semifinals)
4. (El Salvador) Marcelo Arévalo / (Croatia) Mate Pavić (quarterfinals)
5. (Germany) Kevin Krawietz / (Germany) Tim Pütz (second round)
6. (United States) Christian Harrison / (United Kingdom) Neal Skupski (champions)
7. (Italy) Simone Bolelli / (Italy) Andrea Vavassori (first round)
8. (Monaco) Hugo Nys / (France) Édouard Roger-Vasselin (first round)
9. (Portugal) Francisco Cabral / (Austria) Lucas Miedler (second round)
10. (India) Yuki Bhambri / (Sweden) André Göransson (third round)
11. (Argentina) Guido Andreozzi / (France) Manuel Guinard (first round)
12. (France) Sadio Doumbia / (France) Fabien Reboul (quarterfinals)
13. (Argentina) Máximo González / (Argentina) Andrés Molteni (second round)
14. (United States) Robert Cash / (United States) JJ Tracy (third round)
15. (United States) Evan King / (Australia) John Peers (first round)
16. (United States) Austin Krajicek / (Croatia) Nikola Mektić (third round)

Click on the seed number of a player to go to their draw section.

== Draw ==
Key

- Q = Qualifier
- WC = Wild card
- LL = Lucky loser
- Alt = Alternate
- ITF = ITF entry
- PR = Protected ranking
- SR = Special ranking
- SE = Special exempt
- JE = Junior exempt
- JR = Junior Accelerator Programme entrant
- CO = College Accelerator Programme entrant
- NG = Next Gen Accelerator Program entrant
- w/o = Walkover
- r = Retired
- d = Defaulted

=== Finals ===
Quarterfinals
WC	(Australia) Jason Kubler (Australia) Marc Polmans	6	7^{7}
12	(France) Sadio Doumbia (France) Fabien Reboul	4	6^{3}
4	(El Salvador) Marcelo Arévalo (Croatia) Mate Pavić	6^{5}	2
(United Kingdom) Luke Johnson (Poland) Jan Zieliński	7^{7}	6
(Brazil) Orlando Luz (Brazil) Rafael Matos	3	4
3	(Spain) Marcel Granollers (Argentina) Horacio Zeballos	6	6
6	(United States) Christian Harrison (United Kingdom) Neal Skupski	6	6
(Czech Republic) Petr Nouza (Czech Republic) Patrik Rikl	2	3

Semifinals
WC	(Australia) Jason Kubler (Australia) Marc Polmans	6	3	6
(United Kingdom) Luke Johnson (Poland) Jan Zieliński	2	6	3
3	(Spain) Marcel Granollers (Argentina) Horacio Zeballos	3	6^{7}
6	(United States) Christian Harrison (United Kingdom) Neal Skupski	6	7^{9}

Final
WC	(Australia) Jason Kubler (Australia) Marc Polmans	6^{4}	4
6	(United States) Christian Harrison (United Kingdom) Neal Skupski	7^{7}	6

=== Top half ===
==== Section 1 ====
First round
1	(United Kingdom) J Cash (United Kingdom) L Glasspool	7^{7}	6
(Uruguay) A Behar (Belgium) J Vliegen	6^{2}	4
WC	(Australia) J McCabe (Australia) L Tu	6	6
(Belgium) Z Bergs (Belgium) R Collignon	3	1
WC	(Australia) T Kokkinakis (Australia) N Kyrgios	4	6	6^{4}
WC	(Australia) J Kubler (Australia) M Polmans	6	4	7^{10}
(Switzerland) J Paul (United Kingdom) M Willis	7^{7}	6
15	(United States) E King (Australia) J Peers	6^{4}	3
12	(France) S Doumbia (France) F Reboul	4	7	7
(Netherlands) S Arends (Monaco) R Arneodo	6	5	5
(France) T Arribagé (France) A Olivetti	6	7^{7}
PR	(France) A Mannarino (France) F Martin	3	6^{2}
PR	(Kazakhstan) A Golubev (Kazakhstan) A Nedovyesov	3	4
(Argentina) TM Etcheverry (Argentina) C Ugo Carabelli	6	6
(Argentina) F Cerúndolo (Argentina) JM Cerúndolo	6	2	6
8	(Monaco) H Nys (France) É Roger-Vasselin	4	6	3

Second round
1	(United Kingdom) J Cash (United Kingdom) L Glasspool	6^{5}	4
WC	(Australia) J McCabe (Australia) L Tu	7^{7}	6
WC	(Australia) J Kubler (Australia) M Polmans	5	7	6
(Switzerland) J Paul (United Kingdom) M Willis	7	5	4
12	(France) S Doumbia (France) F Reboul	6	6
(France) T Arribagé (France) A Olivetti	3	4
(Argentina) TM Etcheverry (Argentina) C Ugo Carabelli	6	4	6
(Argentina) F Cerúndolo (Argentina) JM Cerúndolo	4	6	2

Third round
WC	(Australia) J McCabe (Australia) L Tu	4	4
WC	(Australia) J Kubler (Australia) M Polmans	6	6
12	(France) S Doumbia (France) F Reboul	7^{9}	6^{6}	6
(Argentina) TM Etcheverry (Argentina) C Ugo Carabelli	6^{7}	7^{8}	1

Quarterfinals
WC	(Australia) J Kubler (Australia) M Polmans	6	7^{7}
12	(France) S Doumbia (France) F Reboul	4	6^{3}

==== Section 2 ====
First round
4	(El Salvador) M Arévalo (Croatia) M Pavić	6	6
PR	(Bosnia and Herzegovina) T Brkić (Bosnia and Herzegovina) D Džumhur	2	3
Alt	(India) S Balaji (Austria) N Oberleitner	7^{7}	3	7^{10}
(France) P-H Herbert (Australia) J Thompson	6^{4}	6	6^{8}
(United States) V Kirkov (Netherlands) B Stevens	6	6
(Ecuador) G Escobar (Mexico) MÁ Reyes-Varela	1	4
(Italy) L Darderi (Chile) C Garín	4	7^{15}	3
16	(United States) A Krajicek (Croatia) N Mektić	6	6^{13}	6
9	(Portugal) F Cabral (Austria) L Miedler	7^{8}	6
(Italy) M Bellucci (Hungary) F Marozsán	6^{6}	2
(Czech Republic) A Pavlásek (Australia) J-P Smith	7^{11}	6
WC	(Australia) P Harper (Australia) A Walton	6^{9}	3
(Australia) R Hijikata (Australia) T Schoolkate	7^{7}	5	4
(United Kingdom) L Johnson (Poland) J Zieliński	6^{3}	7	6
(Chinese Taipei) R Ho (Germany) H Jebens	6^{6}	7^{7}	6
7	(Italy) S Bolelli (Italy) A Vavassori	7^{8}	6^{2}	4

Second round
4	(El Salvador) M Arévalo (Croatia) M Pavić	7	6
Alt	(India) S Balaji (Austria) N Oberleitner	5	1
(United States) V Kirkov (Netherlands) B Stevens	6^{4}	5
16	(United States) A Krajicek (Croatia) N Mektić	7^{7}	7
9	(Portugal) F Cabral (Austria) L Miedler	4	4
(Czech Republic) A Pavlásek (Australia) J-P Smith	6	6
(United Kingdom) L Johnson (Poland) J Zieliński	6^{6}	6	6
(Chinese Taipei) R Ho (Germany) H Jebens	7^{8}	4	4

Third round
4	(El Salvador) M Arévalo (Croatia) M Pavić	7	4	7^{10}
16	(United States) A Krajicek (Croatia) N Mektić	5	6	6^{7}
(Czech Republic) A Pavlásek (Australia) J-P Smith	3	4
(United Kingdom) L Johnson (Poland) J Zieliński	6	6

Quarterfinals
4	(El Salvador) M Arévalo (Croatia) M Pavić	6^{5}	2
(United Kingdom) L Johnson (Poland) J Zieliński	7^{7}	6

=== Bottom half ===
==== Section 3 ====
First round
5	(Germany) K Krawietz (Germany) T Pütz	6	6
(France) A Rinderknech (Monaco) V Vacherot	4	4
(Netherlands) J de Jong (Netherlands) S Verbeek	5	6^{7}
(Brazil) O Luz (Brazil) R Matos	7	7^{9}
(Mexico) S González (Netherlands) D Pel	6	5	7
(Brazil) M Melo (Brazil) F Romboli	4	7	5
WC	(Australia) J Duckworth (Australia) C Hewitt	3	4
10	(India) Y Bhambri (Sweden) A Göransson	6	6
14	(United States) R Cash (United States) JJ Tracy	6	6
(Germany) C Frantzen (Netherlands) R Haase	4	3
(Brazil) M Demoliner (Netherlands) J-J Rojer	6	6
(Kazakhstan) A Bublik (Kazakhstan) A Shevchenko	3	2
WC	(Australia) A Bolt (Australia) D Sweeny	4	6	3
(France) C Moutet (France) L Sanchez	6	3	6
(Argentina) S Báez (Argentina) F Comesaña	2	3
3	(Spain) M Granollers (Argentina) H Zeballos	6	6

Second round
5	(Germany) K Krawietz (Germany) T Pütz	3	6^{5}
(Brazil) O Luz (Brazil) R Matos	6	7^{7}
(Mexico) S González (Netherlands) D Pel	6	6^{5}	3
10	(India) Y Bhambri (Sweden) A Göransson	4	7^{7}	6
14	(United States) R Cash (United States) JJ Tracy	7	6
(Brazil) M Demoliner (Netherlands) J-J Rojer	5	2
(France) C Moutet (France) L Sanchez	1	2
3	(Spain) M Granollers (Argentina) H Zeballos	6	6

Third round
(Brazil) O Luz (Brazil) R Matos	7^{9}	6
10	(India) Y Bhambri (Sweden) A Göransson	6^{7}	3
14	(United States) R Cash (United States) JJ Tracy	3	6	3
3	(Spain) M Granollers (Argentina) H Zeballos	6	3	6

Quarterfinals
(Brazil) O Luz (Brazil) R Matos	3	4
3	(Spain) M Granollers (Argentina) H Zeballos	6	6

==== Section 4 ====
First round
6	(United States) C Harrison (United Kingdom) N Skupski	4	6	6
(Germany) J Schnaitter (Germany) M Wallner	6	4	3
WC	(Thailand) P Isaro (India) N Kaliyanda Poonacha	6^{3}	5
(Spain) P Martínez (Spain) J Munar	7^{7}	7
PR	(China) J Shang (China) Z Zhang	6	6^{6}	2
(Australia) M Ebden (United States) R Ram	3	7^{8}	6
(Netherlands) T Griekspoor (Netherlands) B van de Zandschulp	1	6	6
11	(Argentina) G Andreozzi (France) M Guinard	6	3	4
13	(Argentina) M González (Argentina) A Molteni	6	6
(Czech Republic) T Macháč (Czech Republic) M Vocel	1	4
(Czech Republic) P Nouza (Czech Republic) P Rikl	6^{7}	7^{7}	6
(France) T Atmane (France) A Müller	7^{9}	6^{2}	2
(Australia) M Romios (United States) R Seggerman	2	3
(Austria) A Erler (United States) R Galloway	6	6
(Ecuador) D Hidalgo (United States) P Trhac	4	6^{2}
2	(Finland) H Heliövaara (United Kingdom) H Patten	6	7^{7}

Second round
6	(United States) C Harrison (United Kingdom) N Skupski	6	6
(Spain) P Martínez (Spain) J Munar	3	2
(Australia) M Ebden (United States) R Ram	3	3
(Netherlands) T Griekspoor (Netherlands) B van de Zandschulp	6	6
13	(Argentina) M González (Argentina) A Molteni	2	3
(Czech Republic) P Nouza (Czech Republic) P Rikl	6	6
(Austria) A Erler (United States) R Galloway	6^{5}	6	3
2	(Finland) H Heliövaara (United Kingdom) H Patten	7^{7}	3	6

Third round
6	(United States) C Harrison (United Kingdom) N Skupski	5
(Netherlands) T Griekspoor (Netherlands) B van de Zandschulp	0^{r}
(Czech Republic) P Nouza (Czech Republic) P Rikl	7^{7}	7^{8}
2	(Finland) H Heliövaara (United Kingdom) H Patten	6^{4}	6^{6}

Quarterfinals
6	(United States) C Harrison (United Kingdom) N Skupski	6	6
(Czech Republic) P Nouza (Czech Republic) P Rikl	2	3

== Seeded teams ==
The following are the seeded teams, based on ATP rankings as of 12 January 2026.

Country	Player	Country	Player	Rank	Seed
GBR	Julian Cash	GBR	Lloyd Glasspool	3	1
FIN	Harri Heliövaara	GBR	Henry Patten	6	2
ESP	Marcel Granollers	ARG	Horacio Zeballos	11	3
ESA	Marcelo Arévalo	CRO	Mate Pavić	14	4
GER	Kevin Krawietz	GER	Tim Pütz	22	5
USA	Christian Harrison	GBR	Neal Skupski	24	6
ITA	Simone Bolelli	ITA	Andrea Vavassori	27	7
MON	Hugo Nys	FRA	Édouard Roger-Vasselin	35	8
POR	Francisco Cabral	AUT	Lucas Miedler	42	9
IND	Yuki Bhambri	SWE	André Göransson	43	10
ARG	Guido Andreozzi	FRA	Manuel Guinard	54	11
FRA	Sadio Doumbia	FRA	Fabien Reboul	56	12
ARG	Máximo González	ARG	Andrés Molteni	61	13
USA	Robert Cash	USA	JJ Tracy	65	14
USA	Evan King	AUS	John Peers	66	15
USA	Austin Krajicek	CRO	Nikola Mektić	72	16

== Other entry information ==
=== Wildcards ===
- (Australia) Alex Bolt / (Australia) Dane Sweeny
- (Australia) James Duckworth / (Australia) Cruz Hewitt
- (Australia) Patrick Harper / (Australia) Adam Walton
- (Thailand) Pruchya Isaro / (India) Niki Kaliyanda Poonacha
- (Australia) Thanasi Kokkinakis / (Australia) Nick Kyrgios
- (Australia) Jason Kubler / (Australia) Marc Polmans
- (Australia) James McCabe / (Australia) Li Tu

=== Protected ranking ===
- (Bosnia and Herzegovina) Tomislav Brkić / (Bosnia and Herzegovina) Damir Džumhur
- (Kazakhstan) Andrey Golubev / (Kazakhstan) Aleksandr Nedovyesov
- (France) Adrian Mannarino / (France) Fabrice Martin
- (China) Shang Juncheng / (China) Zhang Zhizhen

=== Alternates ===
- (India) Sriram Balaji / (Austria) Neil Oberleitner

=== Withdrawals ===
- (Poland) Kamil Majchrzak / (United States) Ethan Quinn → replaced by (India) Sriram Balaji / (Austria) Neil Oberleitner
