= Tahlia Kokkinis =

Australian tennis player (born 2008)

- Country (sports): Australia
- Residence: Brisbane, Queensland
- Born: 11 August 2008 (age 18) Sydney, Australia
- Plays: Right (two-handed backhand)
- Prize money: $89,164

Singles
- Career record: 67–55
- Career titles: 2 ITF
- Highest ranking: No. 483 (20 April 202
- Current ranking: No. 526 (31 August 2026)

Grand Slam singles results
- French Open: Q1 (2026)

Doubles
- Career record: 14–22
- Career titles: 1 ITF
- Highest ranking: No. 757 (9 December 2024)
- Current ranking: No. 937 (31 August 2026)
- Last updated on: 1 September 2026.

Tahlia Kokkinis (born 11 August 2008) is an Australian tennis player who has competed on the international junior circuit and begun appearing in professional events on the ITF Women's World Tennis Tour. She reached the girls' singles quarterfinals at the 2025 Australian Open.

Kokkinis has represented Australia in international junior team competition and has won titles on the ITF Junior Circuit as part of her transition from junior to senior-level tennis.

Kokkinis achieved a career-high WTA singles ranking of No. 483 on 20 April 2026.

== Early life and education ==
Kokkinis is of Greek descent and was born on 11 August 2008 in Sydney. She is based in Brisbane, Queensland, and is completing her secondary education through online study. She began playing tennis at an early age and progressed through Tennis Australia's junior development pathways.

== Career ==
=== Juniors ===
Kokkinis recorded early national success by winning the girls' 12-and-under singles title at the 2021 Australian Junior Claycourt Championships.

In 2023, she represented Australia at the Junior Billie Jean King Cup Finals in Spain. During the round-robin stage, she won both of her singles matches, contributing to Australia's progression to the quarterfinals. In 2024, Kokkinis was selected to represent Australia at the Junior Billie Jean King Cup Asia-Oceania qualifying events in Kazakhstan, as part of the national junior team.

Her results on the ITF World Tennis Tour Juniors circuit improved steadily through 2024, when she reached a career-high junior ranking of world No. 141.

Between 2024 and 2025, Kokkinis won multiple singles titles on the ITF Juniors Circuit. Her victories included J60-level tournaments in Lautoka, Fiji, as well as J200 events in Sydney and Istres, where she recorded wins on both hard and clay courts. In 2025, she also won a doubles title at the J200 Open Tennis D'Istres, partnering Capucine Jauffret of USA.

==== Grand Slam tournaments ====
Kokkinis entered the 2025 Australian Open girls' singles tournament as a wildcard entrant. She defeated Rositsa Dencheva, Kanon Sawashiro, and Brooke Black to advance to the quarterfinals, marking her first appearance at that stage of a junior Grand Slam. Her run ended with a quarterfinal loss to Wakana Sonobe of Japan.

In 2025, Kokkinis made her debut at the Wimbledon Championships, reaching the round of 16 in the girls' singles event.

=== Professional ===
Alongside her junior tournaments, Kokkinis began competing in professional events. In March 2024, she won her first pro doubles title at the W35 Mildura International, partnering Alicia Smith.

In June 2025, Kokkinis won a W15 tournament in Monastir, Tunisia, defeating Sofia Camila Rojas in the final, and claimed her first professional singles title. Later that year, she won the W35 Tauranga singles title on hardcourts, defeating Mio Mushika by retirement of her opponent during the final.

Kokkinis was awarded a qualifying wildcard for the women's singles event at the 2026 Australian Open, placing her in the qualifying draw at Melbourne Park.

== Playing style ==
Kokkinis plays right-handed and has described her playing style as aggressive.

== ITF Circuit finals ==
=== Singles: 2 (2 titles) ===
Result	Date	Tournament	Tier	Surface	Opponent	Score
Win	Jun 2025	ITF Monastir, Tunisia	W15	Hard	(United States) Sofia Camila Rojas	7–5, 6–3
Win	Dec 2025	Tauranga Eves Open, New Zealand	W35	Hard	(Japan) Mio Mushika	6–3, 1–0 ret.

=== Doubles: 1 title ===
Result	Date	Tournament	Tier	Surface	Partner	Opponents	Score
Win	Mar 2024	ITF Mildura, Australia	W35	Grass	(Australia) Alicia Smith	(Thailand) Punnin Kovapitukted (China) Lu Jiajing	5–7, 6–2, [10–7]
