= 2023 Wimbledon Championships – Boys' 14&U singles =

Boys' 14&U singles
- 2023 Wimbledon Championships

Final
- Champion: (United Kingdom) Mark Ceban
- Runner-up: (Slovenia) Svit Suljic
- Score: 7–6^{(7–5)}, 6–3

Events
Singles	men	women		boys	girls
Doubles	men	women	mixed	boys	girls
WC Singles	men	women	quad
WC Doubles	men	women	quad
14&U Singles	boys	girls
Legends	men	women	mixed
- Wimbledon Championships

It was the second edition of this discipline. South Korea's Se Hyuk Cho was the defending champion, but he was no longer eligible to participate in the under 14 tournament. He did not return to play in the boys' singles event either. Great Britain's Mark Ceban won the title by defeating Slovenia's Svit Suljic in straight sets.

== Format ==
The first phase of the tournament saw four round-robin groups compete. The winners of each group advanced to the semi-finals. The rest competed in a consolation play-off tournament.

== Draw ==
=== Final ===
Semifinals
A1	(United Kingdom) Mark Ceban [1]	6	6
D2	(Brazil) Luis Augusto Miguel	4	2
C1	(Slovenia) Svit Suljic [3]	6	6
B1	(India) Vihaan Reddy [2]	1	3

Final
A1	(United Kingdom) Mark Ceban [1]	7^{7}	6
C1	(Slovenia) Svit Suljic [3]	6^{5}	3

=== Group A ===
		(United Kingdom) Ceban [1]	(Thailand) Kotikula	(Japan) Ando	(Turkey) Kosaner [5]	RR; W–L	Set; W–L	Game; W–L	Standings
A1	(United Kingdom) Mark Ceban [1]		6–1, 6–3	6–4, 6–0	6–7^{(4–7)}, 6–2, [10–6]	3–0	6–1	37–17	1
A2	(Thailand) Ryu Kotikula	1–6, 3–6		6–0, 6–3	3–6, 2–6	1–2	2–4	21–27	3
A3	(Japan) Daiki Ando	4–6, 0–6	0–6, 3–6		4–6, 3–6	0–3	0–6	14–36	4
A4	(Turkey) Kaan Isik Kosaner [5]	7–6^{(7–4)}, 2–6, [6–10]	6–3, 6–2	6–4, 6–3		2–1	5–2	33–25	2

=== Group B ===
		(India) Reddy [2]	(Australia) King	(Ecuador) Camacho	(United Kingdom) Lawlor [8]	RR; W–L	Set; W–L	Game; W–L	Standings
B1	(India) Vihaan Reddy [2]		6–0 6–1	6–4, 4–6, [9–11]	3–6, 7–5, [10–2]	2–1	5–3	33–23	1
B2	(Australia) Lachlan King	0–6, 1–6		3–6, 4–6	5–7, 3–6	0–3	0–6	16–37	4
B3	(Ecuador) Emilio Camacho	4–6, 6–4, [11–9]	6–3, 6–4		4–6, 6–3, [10–12]	2–1	5–3	33–27	2
B4	(United Kingdom) Rhys Lawlor [8]	6–3, 5–7, [2–10]	7–5, 6–3	6–4, 3–6, [12–10]		2–1	5–3	34–29	3

=== Group C ===
		(Slovenia) Suljic [3]	(United Kingdom) Wright	(Romania) Chelemen	(United States) Ahmad [7]	RR; W–L	Set; W–L	Game; W–L	Standings
C1	(Slovenia) Svit Suljic [3]		6–3, 5–7, [10–6]	6–4, 6–3	3–6, 3–6	2–1	4–3	30–29	1
C2	(United Kingdom) Leo Wright	3–6, 7–5, [6–10]		1–6, 6–7^{(4–7)}	6–2, 6–2	1–2	3–4	29–29	3
C3	(Romania) Matei Victor Chelemen	4–6, 3–6	6–1, 7–6^{(7–4)}		6–2, 6–4	2–1	4–2	32–25	2
C4	(United States) Izyan Ahmad [7]	6–3, 6–3	2–6, 2–6	2–6, 4–6		1–2	2–4	22–30	4

=== Group D ===
		(United States) Latak [4]	(Brazil) Miguel	(Japan) Kobayashi	(Poland) Urbanski [6]	RR; W–L	Set; W–L	Game; W–L	Standings
D1	(United States) Marcel Latak [4]		4–6, 1–6	6–2, 6–2	w/o	2–1	2–2	17–16	2
D2	(Brazil) Luis Augusto Miguel	6–4, 6–1		6–3, 5–7, [10–3]	4–6, 6–3, [10–7]	3–0	6–2	35–24	1
D3	(Japan) Kensuke Kobayashi	2–6, 2–6	3–6, 7–5, [3–10]		4–1, ret.	1–2	2–4	18–25	3
D4	(Poland) Jan Urbanski [6]	w/o	6–4, 3–6, [7–10]	1–4, ret.		0–3	1–3	10–15	4

Standings are determined by: 1. number of wins; 2. number of matches played; 3. in two-players-ties, head-to-head records; 4. in three-players-ties, percentage of sets won, then percentage of games won.

=== Consolation Playoffs ===
First round
A4	(Turkey) Kaan Isik Kosaner [5]	6^{5}	6	[10]
B3	(Ecuador) Emilio Camacho	7^{7}	1	[7]
C3	(Romania) Matei Victor Chelemen	3	2
D1	(United States) Marcel Latak [4]	6	6

Second round
A4	(Turkey) Kaan Isik Kosaner [5]	4^{r}
C4	(United States) Marcel Latak [4]	5

First round
D3	(Japan) Kensuke Kobayashi	6	3	[7]
C2	(United Kingdom) Leo Wright	3	6	[10]
A2	(Thailand) Ryu Kotikula	6	3	[11]
B4	(United Kingdom) Rhys Lawlor [8]	4	6	[13]

Second round
C2	(United Kingdom) Leo Wright	2	3
B4	(United Kingdom) Rhys Lawlor	6	6

First round
C4	(United States) Izyan Ahmad [7]	w/o
D4	(Poland) Jan Urbanski [6]
B2	(Australia) Lachlan King	6^{5}	6	[5]
A3	(Japan) Daiki Ando	7^{7}	2	[10]

Second round
C4	(United States) Izyan Ahmad [7]	7	2	[10]
A3	(Japan) Daiki Ando	5	6	[5]
