= Gabriele Vulpitta =

Italian tennis player

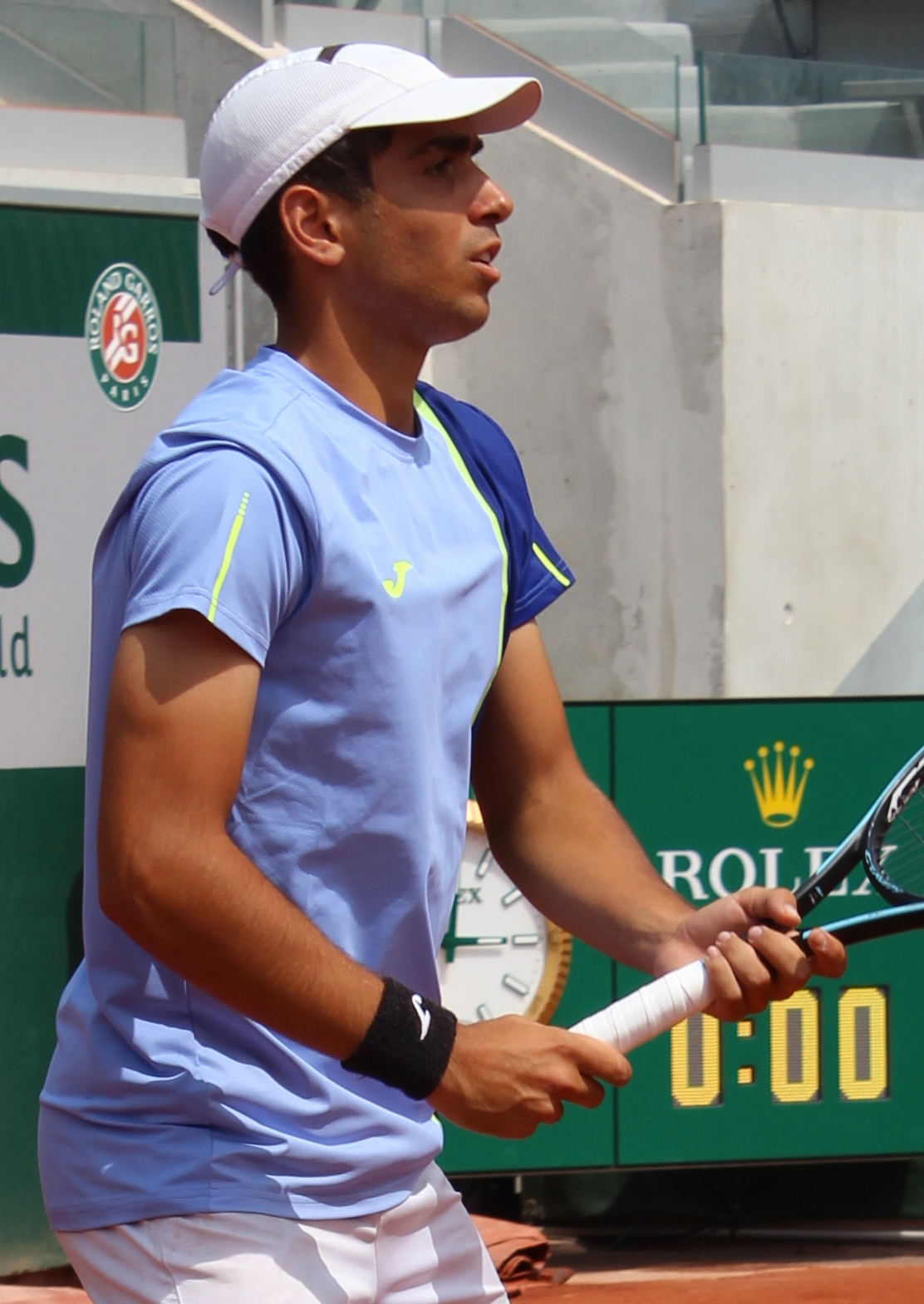
- Vulpitta at the 2023 French Open
- Country (sports): Italy
- Born: June 5, 2005 (age 20)
- Plays: Right-handed

Singles
- Career record: 0–0 (at ATP Tour level, Grand Slam level, and in Davis Cup)

Grand Slam singles results
- French Open Junior: 1R (2023)
- Wimbledon Junior: 1R (2023)
- US Open Junior: 1R (2023)

Doubles
- Career record: 0–0 (at ATP Tour level, Grand Slam level, and in Davis Cup)

Grand Slam doubles results
- French Open Junior: F (2023)
- Wimbledon Junior: W (2023)
- US Open Junior: 2R (2023)

Gabriele Vulpitta (born 25 June 2005) is an Italian tennis player. He became a junior Grand Slam champion in the Boys' doubles at the 2023 Wimbledon Championships.

== Early life ==
From Taranto, in Apulia, Southern Italy. He trained at the Tennis Training School in Foligno.

== Career ==
Vulpitta reached the quarter-finals in the singles’ at the Trofeo Bonfiglio in May 2023. He reached the final of the boys' doubles tournament at the 2023 French Open with Lorenzo Sciahbasi in June 2023, where they lost to Yaroslav Demin and Rodrigo Pacheco Méndez. The following month, he also reached the final of the boys' doubles at the 2023 Wimbledon Championship, this time alongside the Czech player Jakub Filip. They won the final in straight sets against Arthur Géa and Branko Đurić.

== Junior Grand Slam finals ==
=== Doubles: 2 (1 title, 1 runner-up) ===
Result	Year	Tournament	Surface	Partner	Opponents	Score
Loss	2023	French Open	Clay	(Italy) Lorenzo Sciahbasi	Yaroslav Demin (Mexico) Rodrigo Pacheco Méndez	2–6, 3–6
Win	2023	Wimbledon	Grass	(Czech Republic) Jakub Filip	(France) Arthur Géa (Serbia) Branko Đurić	6–3, 6–3
