= 2023 Wimbledon Championships =

- Date: 3–16 July
- Edition: 136th
- Category: Grand Slam (ITF)
- Draw: 128S / 64D / 32XD
- Prize money: £44,700,000
- Surface: Grass
- Location: Church Road; SW19, Wimbledon, London, United Kingdom
- Venue: All England Lawn Tennis and Croquet Club

Champions

Men's singles
- (Spain) Carlos Alcaraz

Women's singles
- (Czech Republic) Markéta Vondroušová

Men's doubles
- (Netherlands) Wesley Koolhof / (United Kingdom) Neal Skupski

Women's doubles
- (Chinese Taipei) Hsieh Su-wei / (Czech Republic) Barbora Strýcová

Mixed doubles
- (Croatia) Mate Pavić / (Ukraine) Lyudmyla Kichenok

Wheelchair men's singles
- (Japan) Tokito Oda

Wheelchair women's singles
- (Netherlands) Diede de Groot

Wheelchair quad singles
- (Netherlands) Niels Vink

Wheelchair men's doubles
- (United Kingdom) Alfie Hewett / (United Kingdom) Gordon Reid

Wheelchair women's doubles
- (Netherlands) Diede de Groot / (Netherlands) Jiske Griffioen

Wheelchair quad doubles
- (Netherlands) Sam Schröder / (Netherlands) Niels Vink

Boys' singles
- (United Kingdom) Henry Searle

Girls' singles
- (United States) Clervie Ngounoue

Boys' doubles
- (Czech Republic) Jakub Filip / (Italy) Gabriele Vulpitta

Girls' doubles
- (Czech Republic) Alena Kovačková / (Czech Republic) Laura Samsonová

Boys' 14&U singles
- (United Kingdom) Mark Ceban

Girls' 14&U singles
- (Serbia) Luna Vujović

Gentlemen's invitation doubles
- (United States) Bob Bryan / (United States) Mike Bryan

Ladies' invitation doubles
- (Belgium) Kim Clijsters / (Switzerland) Martina Hingis

Mixed invitation doubles
- (Serbia) Nenad Zimonjić / (Australia) Rennae Stubbs
- Wimbledon Championships

The 2023 Wimbledon Championships was a major tennis tournament that took place at the All England Lawn Tennis and Croquet Club in Wimbledon, London, United Kingdom.

== Tournament ==
The tournament was played on grass courts, with all main draw matches played at the All England Lawn Tennis and Croquet Club, Wimbledon, from 3 to 16 July 2023. Qualifying matches were played from 26 to 29 June 2023 at the Bank of England Sports Ground in Roehampton.

The 2023 Championships was the 136th edition, the 129th staging of the Ladies’ Singles Championship event, the 55th in the Open Era and the third Grand Slam tournament of the year. The tournament was run by the International Tennis Federation (ITF) and included in the 2023 ATP Tour and the 2023 WTA Tour calendars under the Grand Slam category, as well as the 2023 ITF tours for junior and wheelchair competitions respectively.

The tournament consisted of men's (singles and doubles), women's (singles and doubles), mixed doubles, boys' (under 18 – singles and doubles, under 14 – singles), girls' (under 18 – singles and doubles, under 14 – singles), which are a part of the Grade A category of tournaments for under 18, and singles & doubles events for men's and women's wheelchair tennis players. This edition featured gentlemen's and ladies' invitational doubles competitions and the mixed invitational double draw introduced in the 2022 Wimbledon Championships. The men's doubles competition was changed from best of five sets to best of three sets for all matches.

This was the tournament's second edition with a scheduled order of play on the first Sunday during the event, dubbed "Middle Sunday". Prior to the 2022 edition, the tournament had seen only four exceptions to the tradition of withholding competition on Middle Sunday to accommodate delayed matches during championships that were heavily disrupted by rain.

The tournament saw the return of Russian and Belarusian tennis players, after they were controversially banned from the previous edition due to the Russian invasion of Ukraine.

== Special events ==
In addition to the tournament taking place, Swiss former tennis player Roger Federer was honoured two decades since he won the tournament for the first time in 2003.

== Dress code ==
In 2023 Wimbledon rules allowed for the first time all female players, including in the girls’ singles junior event, to wear non-white underwear; the new rule allowed "solid, mid/dark-coloured undershorts, provided they are no longer than their shorts or skirt".

== Singles players ==
- Gentlemen's singles

Champion		Runner-up	
(Spain) Carlos Alcaraz [1]		(Serbia) Novak Djokovic [2]	
Semifinals out
Daniil Medvedev [3]		(Italy) Jannik Sinner [8]	
Quarterfinals out
(Denmark) Holger Rune [6]	(United States) Christopher Eubanks	Roman Safiullin	Andrey Rublev [7]
4th round out
(Italy) Matteo Berrettini	(Bulgaria) Grigor Dimitrov [21]	(Czech Republic) Jiří Lehečka	(Greece) Stefanos Tsitsipas [5]
(Colombia) Daniel Elahi Galán	(Canada) Denis Shapovalov [26]	(Kazakhstan) Alexander Bublik [23]	(Poland) Hubert Hurkacz [17]
3rd round out
(Chile) Nicolás Jarry [25]	(Germany) Alexander Zverev [19]	(United States) Frances Tiafoe [10]	(Spain) Alejandro Davidovich Fokina [31]
(Hungary) Márton Fucsovics	(United States) Tommy Paul [16]	(Australia) Christopher O'Connell	(Serbia) Laslo Djere
(France) Quentin Halys	(Sweden) Mikael Ymer	(Argentina) Guido Pella (PR)	(United Kingdom) Liam Broady (WC)
(Belgium) David Goffin (WC)	(Germany) Maximilian Marterer (Q)	(Italy) Lorenzo Musetti [14]	(Switzerland) Stan Wawrinka
2nd round out
(France) Alexandre Müller	(Australia) Jason Kubler	(Japan) Yosuke Watanuki (LL)	(Australia) Alex de Minaur [15]
(Switzerland) Dominic Stricker (Q)	Ilya Ivashka	(Netherlands) Botic van de Zandschulp	(Spain) Roberto Carballés Baena
(France) Adrian Mannarino	(United States) Marcos Giron	(Argentina) Francisco Cerúndolo [18]	(Canada) Milos Raonic (PR)
(United Kingdom) Cameron Norrie [12]	(Czech Republic) Jiří Veselý (PR)	(United States) Ben Shelton [32]	(United Kingdom) Andy Murray
(Argentina) Diego Schwartzman	(Australia) Aleksandar Vukic	(Germany) Oscar Otte (Q)	(United States) Taylor Fritz [9]
(France) Harold Mayot (Q)	(France) Corentin Moutet	(France) Grégoire Barrère	(Norway) Casper Ruud [4]
Aslan Karatsev	(Chile) Tomás Barrios Vera (Q)	(United States) J. J. Wolf	(United States) Michael Mmoh (LL)
(Spain) Jaume Munar	(United Kingdom) Jan Choinski (WC)	(Argentina) Tomás Martín Etcheverry [29]	(Australia) Jordan Thompson
1st round out
(France) Jérémy Chardy (PR)	(France) Arthur Rinderknech	(France) Ugo Humbert	(Italy) Marco Cecchinato
(Netherlands) Gijs Brouwer (Q)	(Switzerland) Marc-Andrea Hüsler	(Italy) Lorenzo Sonego	(Belgium) Kimmer Coppejans (Q)
(China) Wu Yibing	(Australia) Alexei Popyrin	(Argentina) Federico Coria	(Japan) Sho Shimabukuro (Q)
(France) Arthur Fils (WC)	(China) Zhang Zhizhen	(Italy) Matteo Arnaldi (Q)	(United Kingdom) George Loffhagen (WC)
(United Kingdom) Arthur Fery (WC)	Alexander Shevchenko	(Bolivia) Hugo Dellien (PR)	(Netherlands) Tallon Griekspoor [28]
(Portugal) Nuno Borges	(Austria) Sebastian Ofner (WC)	(Austria) Dennis Novak (Q)	(Japan) Shintaro Mochizuki (Q)
(Czech Republic) Tomáš Macháč (Q)	(Brazil) Thiago Monteiro	(Serbia) Hamad Medjedovic (Q)	(United States) Sebastian Korda [22]
(Japan) Taro Daniel (LL)	(United States) Maxime Cressy	(United Kingdom) Ryan Peniston (WC)	(Austria) Dominic Thiem
(Argentina) Juan Manuel Cerúndolo	(Serbia) Miomir Kecmanović	(Germany) Daniel Altmaier	(United Kingdom) Dan Evans [27]
(Japan) Yoshihito Nishioka [24]	(Germany) Dominik Koepfer	(Slovakia) Alex Molčan	(Germany) Yannick Hanfmann
(Croatia) Borna Ćorić [13]	(France) Benjamin Bonzi	(France) Richard Gasquet	(Spain) Roberto Bautista Agut [20]
(Moldova) Radu Albot (Q)	(South Africa) Lloyd Harris (PR)	(France) Constant Lestienne	(France) Laurent Lokoli (Q)
(Australia) Max Purcell	(France) Luca Van Assche	(Argentina) Sebastián Báez	(Hungary) Fábián Marozsán (LL)
(United States) Mackenzie McDonald	(France) Enzo Couacaud (Q)	(Croatia) Borna Gojo	(Canada) Félix Auger-Aliassime [11]
(Peru) Juan Pablo Varillas	(United States) John Isner	(Serbia) Dušan Lajović	(Spain) Albert Ramos Viñolas
(Spain) Bernabé Zapata Miralles	(Finland) Emil Ruusuvuori	(United States) Brandon Nakashima	(Argentina) Pedro Cachín

- Ladies' singles

Champion		Runner-up	
(Czech Republic) Markéta Vondroušová		(Tunisia) Ons Jabeur [6]	
Semifinals out
(Ukraine) Elina Svitolina (WC)		Aryna Sabalenka [2]	
Quarterfinals out
(Poland) Iga Świątek [1]	(United States) Jessica Pegula [4]	(Kazakhstan) Elena Rybakina [3]	(United States) Madison Keys [25]
4th round out
(Switzerland) Belinda Bencic [14]	Victoria Azarenka [19]	(Ukraine) Lesia Tsurenko	(Czech Republic) Marie Bouzková [32]
(Czech Republic) Petra Kvitová [9]	(Brazil) Beatriz Haddad Maia [13]	Mirra Andreeva (Q)	Ekaterina Alexandrova [21]
3rd round out
(Croatia) Petra Martić [30]	(Poland) Magda Linette [23]	Daria Kasatkina [11]	(United States) Sofia Kenin (Q)
(Italy) Elisabetta Cocciaretto	(Romania) Ana Bogdan	(Croatia) Donna Vekić [20]	(France) Caroline Garcia [5]
(Canada) Bianca Andreescu	(Serbia) Natalija Stevanović (Q)	(Romania) Sorana Cîrstea	(United Kingdom) Katie Boulter (WC)
(Ukraine) Marta Kostyuk	Anastasia Potapova [22]	(Hungary) Dalma Gálfi	Anna Blinkova
2nd round out
(Spain) Sara Sorribes Tormo (PR)	(France) Diane Parry	(Czech Republic) Barbora Strýcová (PR)	(United States) Danielle Collins
(United Kingdom) Jodie Burrage (WC)	(Argentina) Nadia Podoroska	(Belgium) Elise Mertens [28]	(China) Wang Xinyu
(Spain) Cristina Bucșa	(Spain) Rebeka Masarova	(Czech Republic) Kateřina Siniaková	(United States) Alycia Parks
Veronika Kudermetova [12]	(United States) Sloane Stephens	(Estonia) Anett Kontaveit	(Canada) Leylah Fernandez
(China) Bai Zhuoxuan (Q)	(Ukraine) Anhelina Kalinina [26]	(Germany) Tamara Korpatsch (LL)	Aliaksandra Sasnovich
(Romania) Jaqueline Cristian (PR)	(Latvia) Jeļena Ostapenko [17]	(Bulgaria) Viktoriya Tomova	(France) Alizé Cornet
(Spain) Paula Badosa	(Switzerland) Viktorija Golubic (Q)	(Slovenia) Kaja Juvan (Q)	(Czech Republic) Barbora Krejčíková [10]
(Germany) Jule Niemeier	(United States) Madison Brengle	(Romania) Irina-Camelia Begu [29]	(France) Varvara Gracheva
1st round out
(China) Zhu Lin	(Italy) Martina Trevisan	(United Kingdom) Harriet Dart (WC)	(Czech Republic) Linda Fruhvirtová
(Switzerland) Jil Teichmann	(Belgium) Maryna Zanevska	(Austria) Julia Grabher	(United Kingdom) Katie Swan (WC)
(United States) Caroline Dolehide	(United States) Caty McNally	(Czech Republic) Tereza Martincová	(China) Yuan Yue (Q)
(Slovakia) Viktória Hrunčáková (Q)	(United States) Venus Williams (WC)	(Australia) Storm Hunter (Q)	(United States) Coco Gauff [7]
(United States) Lauren Davis	Kamilla Rakhimova	(Colombia) Camila Osorio	(Egypt) Mayar Sherif [31]
(China) Zheng Qinwen [24]	(United States) Claire Liu	(Germany) Anna-Lena Friedsam	Liudmila Samsonova [15]
(Estonia) Kaia Kanepi	(United States) Peyton Stearns	(Sweden) Rebecca Peterson	(China) Zhang Shuai
(Switzerland) Simona Waltert (Q)	(Italy) Lucrezia Stefanini (Q)	(Ukraine) Kateryna Baindl	(United States) Katie Volynets
(Poland) Magdalena Fręch	(Belgium) Ysaline Bonaventure	(Hungary) Anna Bondár	(Spain) Jéssica Bouzas Maneiro (Q)
(Czech Republic) Karolína Plíšková [18]	(Canada) Carol Zhao (Q)	(Spain) Nuria Párrizas Díaz	(Italy) Jasmine Paolini
(Kazakhstan) Yulia Putintseva	(Italy) Lucia Bronzetti	(Germany) Tatjana Maria	(Belgium) Greet Minnen (Q)
(United States) Bernarda Pera [27]	(Australia) Daria Saville (PR)	(Japan) Nao Hibino (LL)	(United States) Shelby Rogers
(Greece) Maria Sakkari [8]	(United States) Alison Riske-Amritraj	(Slovakia) Anna Karolína Schmiedlová	(United Kingdom) Sonay Kartal (WC)
(Switzerland) Céline Naef (Q)	Margarita Betova (PR)	(China) Wang Xiyu	(United Kingdom) Heather Watson (WC)
(Czech Republic) Karolína Muchová [16]	(Czech Republic) Linda Nosková	(Italy) Sara Errani	(United States) Emma Navarro
(Canada) Rebecca Marino	(Belgium) Yanina Wickmayer (Q)	(Italy) Camila Giorgi	(Hungary) Panna Udvardy

== Events ==
=== Gentlemen's singles ===
- (Spain) Carlos Alcaraz def. (Serbia) Novak Djokovic, 1–6, 7–6^{(8–6)}, 6–1, 3–6, 6–4

=== Ladies' singles ===
- (Czech Republic) Markéta Vondroušová def. (Tunisia) Ons Jabeur, 6–4, 6–4

=== Gentlemen's doubles ===
- (Netherlands) Wesley Koolhof / (United Kingdom) Neal Skupski def. (Spain) Marcel Granollers / (Argentina) Horacio Zeballos, 6–4, 6–4

=== Ladies' doubles ===
- (Chinese Taipei) Hsieh Su-wei / (Czech Republic) Barbora Strýcová def. (Australia) Storm Hunter / (Belgium) Elise Mertens, 7–5, 6–4

=== Mixed doubles ===
- (Croatia) Mate Pavić / (Ukraine) Lyudmyla Kichenok def. (Belgium) Joran Vliegen / (China) Xu Yifan, 6–4, 6–7^{(9–11)}, 6–3

=== Wheelchair gentlemen's singles ===
- (Japan) Tokito Oda def. (United Kingdom) Alfie Hewett, 6–4, 6–2

=== Wheelchair ladies' singles ===
- (Netherlands) Diede de Groot def. (Netherlands) Jiske Griffioen, 6–2, 6–1

=== Wheelchair quad singles ===
- (Netherlands) Niels Vink def. (Australia) Heath Davidson, 6–1, 6–2

=== Wheelchair gentlemen's doubles ===
- (United Kingdom) Alfie Hewett / (United Kingdom) Gordon Reid def. (Japan) Takuya Miki / (Japan) Tokito Oda, 3–6, 6–0, 6–3

=== Wheelchair ladies' doubles ===
- (Netherlands) Diede de Groot / (Netherlands) Jiske Griffioen def. (Japan) Yui Kamiji / (South Africa) Kgothatso Montjane, 6–1, 6–4

=== Wheelchair quad doubles ===
- (Netherlands) Sam Schröder / (Netherlands) Niels Vink def. (Australia) Heath Davidson / (Canada) Robert Shaw, 7–6^{(7–5)}, 6–0

=== Boys' singles ===
- (United Kingdom) Henry Searle def. Yaroslav Demin, 6–4, 6–4

=== Girls' singles ===
- (United States) Clervie Ngounoue def. (Czech Republic) Nikola Bartůňková, 6–2, 6–2

=== Boys' doubles ===
- (Czech Republic) Jakub Filip / (Italy) Gabriele Vulpitta def. (Serbia) Branko Djuric / (France) Arthur Géa, 6–3, 6–3

=== Girls' doubles ===
- (Czech Republic) Alena Kovačková / (Czech Republic) Laura Samsonová def. (United Kingdom) Hannah Klugman / (United Kingdom) Isabelle Lacy, 6–4, 7–5

=== Boys' 14&U singles ===
- (United Kingdom) Mark Ceban def. (Slovenia) Svit Suljić, 7–6^{(7–5)}, 6–3

=== Girls' 14&U singles ===
- (Serbia) Luna Vujović def. (United Kingdom) Hollie Smart, 6–3, 6–1

=== Gentlemen's invitation doubles ===
- (United States) Bob Bryan / (United States) Mike Bryan def. (United States) James Blake / (Australia) Lleyton Hewitt, 6–4, 3–6, [10–6]

=== Ladies' invitation doubles ===
- (Belgium) Kim Clijsters / (Switzerland) Martina Hingis def. (Zimbabwe) Cara Black / (Denmark) Caroline Wozniacki, 6–1, 7–5

=== Mixed invitation doubles ===
- (Serbia) Nenad Zimonjić / (Australia) Rennae Stubbs def. (United Kingdom) Greg Rusedski / (Spain) Conchita Martínez, 6–2, 6–2

== Point and prize money distribution ==
=== Point distribution ===
Below is the tables with the point distribution for each phase of the tournament.

==== Senior points ====
Event	W	F	SF	QF	Round of 16	Round of 32	Round of 64	Round of 128	Q	Q3	Q2	Q1
Men's singles	2000	1200	720	360	180	90	45	10	25	16	8	0
Men's doubles	2000	1200	720	360	180	90	0	—	25	—	0	0
Women's singles	2000	1300	780	430	240	130	70	10	40	30	20	2
Women's doubles	2000	1300	780	430	240	130	10	—	—	—	—	—

==== Wheelchair points ====
Event	W	F	3rd	4th
Singles	800	500	375	100
Doubles	800	500	100	—

==== Junior points ====
Event	W	F	SF	QF	Round of 16	Round of 32	Q	Q3
Boys' singles	1000	600	370	200	100	45	30	20
Girls' singles	1000	600	370	200	100	45	30	20
Boys' doubles	750	450	275	150	75	—N/a	—N/a	—N/a
Girls' doubles	750	450	275	150	75	—N/a	—N/a	—N/a

=== Prize money ===
The Wimbledon Championships total prize money for 2023 is £44,700,000, an increase of 10.78% from the 2022 edition.

Event	W	F	SF	QF	Round of 16	Round of 32	Round of 64	Round of 128^{1}	Q3	Q2	Q1
Singles	£2,350,000	£1,175,000	£600,000	£340,000	£207,000	£131,000	£85,000	£55,000	£36,000	£21,750	£12,750
Doubles *	£600,000	£300,000	£150,000	£75,000	£36,250	£22,000	£13,750	—N/a	—N/a	—N/a	—N/a
Mixed Doubles *	£128,000	£64,000	£32,000	£16,500	£7,750	£4,000	—N/a	—N/a	—N/a	—N/a	—N/a
Wheelchair Singles	£60,000	£31,000	£21,000	£14,500	—N/a	—N/a	—N/a	—N/a	—N/a	—N/a	—N/a
Wheelchair Doubles *	£26,000	£13,000	£8,000	—N/a	—N/a	—N/a	—N/a	—N/a	—N/a	—N/a	—N/a
Quad Singles	£60,000	£31,000	£21,000	£14,500	—N/a	—N/a	—N/a	—N/a	—N/a	—N/a	—N/a
Quad Doubles *	£26,000	£13,000	£8,000	—N/a	—N/a	—N/a	—N/a	—N/a	—N/a	—N/a	—N/a

*per team

Preceded by 2022 Wimbledon Championships	Wimbledon Championships	Succeeded by 2024 Wimbledon Championships
Preceded by 2023 French Open	Grand Slam events	Succeeded by 2023 US Open
