= 2026 US Open (tennis) =

- Date: August 30 (Note: Mixed doubles competition began on August 25.) – September 13
- Edition: 146th
- Category: Grand Slam (World Tennis)
- Draw: 128S/64D
- Prize money: $108,000,000
- Surface: Hard
- Location: New York City, United States
- Venue: USTA Billie Jean King National Tennis Center

Champions

Men's singles
- (Germany) Alexander Zverev

Women's singles
- (Kazakhstan) Elena Rybakina

Men's doubles
- (United States) Christian Harrison / (United Kingdom) Neal Skupski

Women's doubles
- (Czech Republic) Kateřina Siniaková / (United States) Taylor Townsend

Mixed doubles
- (Czech Republic) Karolína Muchová / (Czech Republic) Jakub Menšík

Wheelchair men's singles
- (United Kingdom) Alfie Hewett

Wheelchair women's singles
- (Japan) Yui Kamiji

Wheelchair quad singles
- (Netherlands) Niels Vink

Wheelchair men's doubles
- (United Kingdom) Alfie Hewett / (United Kingdom) Gordon Reid

Wheelchair women's doubles
- (Japan) Yui Kamiji / (China) Zhu Zhenzhen

Wheelchair quad doubles
- (Netherlands) Sam Schröder / (Australia) Jin Woodman

Boys' singles
- (United States) Marcel Latak

Girls' singles
- (China) Sun Xinran

Boys' doubles
- (France) Aaron Gabet / (Spain) Valentín González-Galiño

Girls' doubles
- (United States) Annika Penickova / (United States) Kristina Penickova

Wheelchair boys' singles
- (United Kingdom) Matthew Knoesen

Wheelchair girls' singles
- (Japan) Seira Matsuoka

Wheelchair boys' doubles
- (Japan) Hirofumi Inoue / (United Kingdom) Matthew Knoesen

Wheelchair girls' doubles
- (Colombia) Paula Michelle López Meza / (Japan) Seira Matsuoka
- US Open

The 2026 US Open was the 146th edition of tennis' US Open, and the fourth and final Grand Slam event of the year. It was held on the outdoor hard courts at the USTA Billie Jean King National Tennis Center in New York City. Carlos Alcaraz and Aryna Sabalenka were the men's and women's singles defending champions, but could not defend their titles.

== Singles players ==
- Men's singles

Champion		Runner-up	
(Germany) Alexander Zverev [1]		(United States) Ben Shelton [8]	
Semifinals out
Karen Khachanov		(United States) Frances Tiafoe [11]	
Quarterfinals out
(Netherlands) Botic van de Zandschulp	(Belgium) Alexander Blockx [28]	(United States) Alex Michelsen	(Spain) Carlos Alcaraz [2]
4th round out
(Italy) Luciano Darderi [21]	(France) Arthur Géa (LL)	(United States) Learner Tien [14]	(Argentina) Francisco Cerúndolo [24]
Daniil Medvedev [7]	(Argentina) Tomás Martín Etcheverry [27]	(Greece) Stefanos Tsitsipas	(United States) Tommy Paul [20]
3rd round out
(Chile) Alejandro Tabilo [25]	(Australia) Dane Sweeny (WC)	(United States) Michael Zheng (WC)	(Belgium) Zizou Bergs [31]
(France) Benjamin Bonzi	(Czech Republic) Jakub Menšík [17]	(United States) Taylor Fritz [9]	(Italy) Flavio Cobolli [5]
(France) Arthur Rinderknech [26]	(Monaco) Valentin Vacherot [22]	(Spain) Daniel Mérida	(Argentina) Mariano Navone
(Canada) Denis Shapovalov	(Czech Republic) Jiří Lehečka [18]	(Kazakhstan) Alexander Bublik [15]	(China) Wu Yibing
2nd round out
(France) Quentin Halys	(Australia) Alexei Popyrin	(Czech Republic) Dalibor Svrčina (Q)	(Italy) Lorenzo Musetti [13]
(China) Bu Yunchaokete (LL)	(United States) Zachary Svajda	(Netherlands) Jesper de Jong	(Australia) Alex de Minaur [6]
(Canada) Félix Auger-Aliassime [3]	(Peru) Ignacio Buse [32]	(Austria) Jurij Rodionov (Q)	(France) Gaël Monfils (WC)
(Italy) Mattia Bellucci	(Germany) Jan-Lennard Struff	(Argentina) Marco Trungelliti	(Australia) Tristan Schoolkate (Q)
(United States) Sebastian Gorzny (WC)	(Spain) Jaume Munar	(Poland) Kamil Majchrzak	(Japan) Rei Sakamoto (Q)
(United States) Brandon Nakashima [16]	Andrey Rublev [23]	(United Kingdom) Jacob Fearnley (LL)	(Italy) Matteo Berrettini
(Poland) Hubert Hurkacz	(France) Luca Van Assche	(United Kingdom) Toby Samuel (Q)	(South Africa) Lloyd Harris (Q)
(France) Adrian Mannarino	(Croatia) Dino Prižmić	(Australia) James Duckworth	(Portugal) Jaime Faria
1st round out
(Italy) Lorenzo Sonego	(Argentina) Facundo Díaz Acosta	(Bulgaria) Grigor Dimitrov (Q)	(Germany) Yannick Hanfmann
(United Kingdom) Harry Wendelken (Q)	(France) Valentin Royer	(France) Corentin Moutet	(United Kingdom) Arthur Fery
(Spain) Rafael Jódar [12]	(Hungary) Fábián Marozsán	(Germany) Daniel Altmaier	(Argentina) Juan Manuel Cerúndolo
(Spain) Carlos Taberner (PR)	(Italy) Francesco Passaro (Q)	(United Kingdom) Jan Choinski	(Italy) Andrea Guerrieri (Q)
(Australia) Rinky Hijikata	(Argentina) Román Andrés Burruchaga	(Slovakia) Alex Molčan	(United States) Marcos Giron
(Japan) Shintaro Mochizuki (LL)	(France) Giovanni Mpetshi Perricard	(Paraguay) Adolfo Daniel Vallejo	(Portugal) Nuno Borges
(United States) Darwin Blanch (WC)	(Hungary) Zsombor Piros (Q)	(Argentina) Camilo Ugo Carabelli	(Austria) Filip Misolic (PR)
(Chile) Tomás Barrios Vera (Q)	(China) Shang Juncheng (PR)	(United States) Nishesh Basavareddy (Q)	(Argentina) Francisco Comesaña
(France) Hugo Gaston (Q)	(Belgium) Raphaël Collignon	(France) Térence Atmane	(Japan) Sho Shimabukuro
(United States) Aleksandar Kovacevic	(Serbia) Hamad Medjedovic	(Australia) Aleksandar Vukic	(United States) Martin Damm
(Argentina) Sebastián Báez	(Italy) Federico Cinà (Q)	(Hungary) Márton Fucsovics	(Finland) Otto Virtanen (LL)
(Czech Republic) Vít Kopřiva	(Spain) Martín Landaluce	(Switzerland) Stan Wawrinka (WC)	(Serbia) Novak Djokovic [4]
(Netherlands) Tallon Griekspoor	(Bosnia and Herzegovina) Damir Džumhur	(Serbia) Miomir Kecmanović	(United Kingdom) Cameron Norrie [29]
(Spain) Pablo Carreño Busta	(Czech Republic) Tomáš Macháč	(United States) Jack Kennedy (WC)	(France) Arthur Fils [10]
(United States) J. J. Wolf (WC)	(Argentina) Thiago Agustín Tirante	(Kazakhstan) Alexander Shevchenko	(Hong Kong) Coleman Wong (Q)
(Italy) Matteo Arnaldi [30]	(Australia) Adam Walton	(United States) Jenson Brooksby	Roman Safiullin

- Women's singles

Champion		Runner-up	
(Kazakhstan) Elena Rybakina [2]		Aryna Sabalenka [1]	
Semifinals out
(United States) Jessica Pegula [3]		(United States) Coco Gauff [4]	
Quarterfinals out
(Czech Republic) Linda Nosková [6]	(United States) Emma Navarro [26]	Mirra Andreeva [5]	(China) Zheng Qinwen (Q)
4th round out
(United States) Taylor Townsend	(Ukraine) Marta Kostyuk [11]	(Romania) Sorana Cîrstea [16]	Anna Kalinskaya [21]
(Austria) Anastasia Potapova [24]	(United States) Iva Jovic [14]	(Poland) Iga Świątek [8]	(Japan) Naomi Osaka [13]
3rd round out
(Uzbekistan) Kamilla Rakhimova	Diana Shnaider [15]	Ekaterina Alexandrova [18]	(United States) Ann Li [29]
(Canada) Leylah Fernandez [31]	(Italy) Jasmine Paolini [19]	(Ukraine) Elina Svitolina [9]	(Czech Republic) Karolína Muchová [7]
(Czech Republic) Nikola Bartůňková	(United States) Amanda Anisimova [10]	(Philippines) Alexandra Eala [17]	(Spain) Cristina Bucșa
(Czech Republic) Marie Bouzková [25]	(United States) Madison Keys [22]	(Belgium) Elise Mertens [23]	(Ukraine) Yuliia Starodubtseva
2nd round out
Polina Iatcenko (Q)	(Spain) Oksana Selekhmeteva	(Australia) Taylah Preston (WC)	(Czech Republic) Karolína Plíšková
(United States) Sloane Stephens (WC)	(Australia) Kimberly Birrell	(Croatia) Donna Vekić	(Thailand) Lanlana Tararudee
(United States) Sofia Kenin (WC)	(Thailand) Mananchaya Sawangkaew (PR)	(Italy) Lucrezia Stefanini (Q)	(France) Diane Parry
(Australia) Maya Joint	(China) Wang Xinyu	(United States) Caty McNally	(United Kingdom) Katie Boulter
(Germany) Eva Lys	(Germany) Tatjana Maria	(France) Léolia Jeanjean (WC)	(Austria) Lilli Tagger
(United Kingdom) Francesca Jones (Q)	(Ukraine) Oleksandra Oliynykova	(Japan) Himeno Sakatsume (Q)	(Spain) Paula Badosa
(Argentina) Nadia Podoroska (PR)	(United Kingdom) Harriet Dart (Q)	(Hungary) Anna Bondár	(Kazakhstan) Yulia Putintseva
(Czech Republic) Kateřina Siniaková	(Uzbekistan) Maria Timofeeva	(Greece) Maria Sakkari [32]	(Spain) Jéssica Bouzas Maneiro
1st round out
(Colombia) Camila Osorio	(Mexico) Renata Zarazúa	(Japan) Aoi Ito (PR)	(Czech Republic) Barbora Krejčíková [27]
(Poland) Maja Chwalińska [20]	(United States) Alycia Parks	(Belgium) Hanne Vandewinkel	(Ukraine) Daria Snigur
(Australia) Storm Hunter (Q)	(Denmark) Clara Tauson	(Croatia) Petra Marčinko	(United States) McCartney Kessler
(Croatia) Antonia Ružić	(Australia) Talia Gibson	(United States) Elvina Kalieva (Q)	(United States) Katie Volynets
(Romania) Elena-Gabriela Ruse	(United States) Venus Williams (WC)	(Hungary) Panna Udvardy	(China) Zhang Shuai
(Slovenia) Veronika Erjavec	(Ukraine) Dayana Yastremska	(Switzerland) Viktorija Golubic	(Austria) Julia Grabher
(Argentina) Solana Sierra	Liudmila Samsonova	(Colombia) Emiliana Arango	Anna Blinkova
(France) Loïs Boisson (PR)	(Netherlands) Anouk Koevermans (Q)	(United States) Carol Young Suh Lee (WC)	(Austria) Sinja Kraus
(Indonesia) Janice Tjen	(Czech Republic) Gabriela Knutson (Q)	(Egypt) Mayar Sherif	(Latvia) Jeļena Ostapenko [30]
(Latvia) Darja Semeņistaja (LL)	(Netherlands) Arantxa Rus (Q)	(Germany) Tamara Korpatsch	(United States) Ashlyn Krueger
(Poland) Magdalena Fręch	(Poland) Magda Linette	(United States) Reese Brantmeier (WC)	(United States) Mary Stoiana (Q)
(Czech Republic) Sára Bejlek [28]	(Ukraine) Anhelina Kalinina	(Australia) Daria Kasatkina	(Turkey) Zeynep Sönmez
(China) Wang Xiyu	(Switzerland) Simona Waltert	(United States) Peyton Stearns	(France) Elsa Jacquemot
Alina Korneeva	(Czech Republic) Lucie Havlíčková (Q)	Kristina Liutova (Q)	(Switzerland) Belinda Bencic [12]
Anastasia Zakharova	(Italy) Elisabetta Cocciaretto	(Slovenia) Tamara Zidanšek (Q)	(Spain) Kaitlin Quevedo
(United States) Robin Montgomery (Q)	(Germany) Ella Seidel	(Czech Republic) Darja Vidmanova	(United States) Thea Frodin (WC)

== Notable stories ==
=== Special events ===
On August 23, 2026 to start fan week was the annual Arthur Ashe Kids' Day event, an event that aims to encourage future generations to play tennis and identify the sport's future stars.

The induction ceremony for the International Tennis Hall of Fame "Class of 2026" took place on Saturday August 29, 2026, featuring Swiss former professional tennis player Roger Federer and retired producer Mary Carillo as the headliners.

=== Singles highlights ===
In men's singles play, Alexander Zverev defeated US player Ben Shelton 6–3, 7–6^{(7–2)}, 5–7, 6–2, which marked the first time since 1989 the US Open men's singles was won by a German. It was Zverev's second major championship.

Four-time champion Novak Djokovic was eliminated in the first round. This was only the third time in his career that he lost in the opening round of a major. Botic van de Zandschulp took 5 hours 13 minutes to defeat Arthur Gea in the 4th round. This was the fourth longest match in US Open history. In the match of the tournament, Ben Shelton defeated Carlos Alcaraz in a fifth-set tiebreak in men's quarterfinal action. The match didn't finish until 3:33am local time.

On the women's side of singles, Elena Rybakina defeated defending champion Aryna Sabalenka 6-4, 5-7, 6-2 to win her first US Open women's singles title. The victory was Rybakina's third Grand Slam title and her second major championship of 2026. A notable highlight was that she received the trophy from the Russian retired tennis player Maria Sharapova. The tournament organizers allowed Sharapova to present the title to the winner as a tribute to her own victory there 20 years ago.

In other singles highlights, Zheng Qinwen came from 0–5 down in a set in consecutive matches to eventually win the sets and the matches. All four women's quarterfinal matches were very competitive and went the three-set distance.

=== Doubles highlights ===
In women's doubles, Kateřina Siniaková and Taylor Townsend defeated Ashlyn Krueger and Robin Montgomery in the final and completed a team Career Grand Slam; Siniaková's second and Townsend's first.

A separate mixed doubles event began on August 24 with four rounds and four seeded teams, and all but one seeded team was eliminated in the first round. In the final, Karolína Muchová and Jakub Menšík defeated Belinda Bencic and Flavio Cobolli to win the title.

=== Other highlights ===
Before the US Open semifinal match between Americans Ben Shelton and Frances Tiafoe—won by the first—there were tributes and commemorations marking the 25th anniversary of the September 11, 2001 attacks, featuring a musical performance and the unfurling of a giant flag on the Arthur Ashe court.

== Events ==
=== Men's singles ===
- (Germany) Alexander Zverev def. (United States) Ben Shelton, 6–3, 7–6^{(7–2)}, 5–7, 6–2

=== Women's singles ===
- (Kazakhstan) Elena Rybakina def. Aryna Sabalenka, 6–4, 5–7, 6–2

=== Men's doubles ===
- (United States) Christian Harrison / (United Kingdom) Neal Skupski def. (Germany) Kevin Krawietz / (Germany) Tim Pütz, 6–4, 7–6^{(8–6)}

=== Women's doubles ===
- (Czech Republic) Kateřina Siniaková / (United States) Taylor Townsend def. (United States) Ashlyn Krueger / (United States) Robin Montgomery, 5–7, 6–0, 6–2

=== Mixed doubles ===
- (Czech Republic) Karolína Muchová / (Czech Republic) Jakub Menšík def. (Switzerland) Belinda Bencic / (Italy) Flavio Cobolli, 6–3, 1–6, [10–6]

=== Wheelchair men's singles ===
- (United Kingdom) Alfie Hewett def. (Japan) Tokito Oda, 6–0, 7–6^{(7–5)}

=== Wheelchair women's singles ===
- (Japan) Yui Kamiji def. (Netherlands) Diede de Groot, 6–2, 1–6, 6–3

=== Wheelchair quad singles ===
- (Netherlands) Niels Vink def. (Netherlands) Sam Schröder, 6–2, 7–5

=== Wheelchair men's doubles ===
- (United Kingdom) Alfie Hewett / (United Kingdom) Gordon Reid def. (Spain) Martín de la Puente / (Netherlands) Ruben Spaargaren, 2–6, 6–3, [10–7]

=== Wheelchair women's doubles ===
- (Japan) Yui Kamiji / (China) Zhu Zhenzhen def. (China) Guo Luoyao / (Japan) Momoko Ohtani, 6–1, 6–2

=== Wheelchair quad doubles ===
- (Netherlands) Sam Schröder / (Australia) Jin Woodman def. (Israel) Guy Sasson / (Netherlands) Niels Vink, 6–3, 2–6, [10–7]

=== Boys' singles ===
- (United States) Marcel Latak def. (Brazil) Guto Miguel, 3–6, 7–5, 7–6^{(15–13)}

=== Girls' singles ===
- (China) Sun Xinran def. Anna Pushkareva, 6–4, 4–6, 6–0

=== Boys' doubles ===
- (France) Aaron Gabet / (Spain) Valentín González-Galiño def. (United States) Tanishk Konduri / (United States) Marcel Latak, 7–6^{(7–5)}, 2–6, [11–9]

=== Girls' doubles ===
- (United States) Annika Penickova / (United States) Kristina Penickova def. Polina Berezina / Alisa Terentyeva, 7–6^{(13–11)}, 6–3

=== Wheelchair boys' singles ===
- (United Kingdom) Matthew Knoesen def. (Australia) Sonny Rennison, 6–0, 6–2

=== Wheelchair girls' singles ===
- (Japan) Seira Matsuoka def. (Belgium) Luna Gryp, 7–6^{(7–3)}, 6–3

=== Wheelchair boys' doubles ===
- (Japan) Hirofumi Inoue / (United Kingdom) Matthew Knoesen def. (United Kingdom) Will Barton / (Italy) Lorenzo Politano, 6–1, 6–0

=== Wheelchair girls' doubles ===
- (Colombia) Paula Michelle López Meza / (Japan) Seira Matsuoka def. (Sweden) Emma Gjerseth / (United States) Lucy Heald, 6–4, 6–3

== Point and prize money distribution ==
=== Point distribution ===
==== Senior points ====
Event	W	F	SF	QF	Round of 16	Round of 32	Round of 64	Round of 128	Q	Q3	Q2	Q1
Men's singles	2000	1300	800	400	200	100	50	10	30	16	8	0
Men's doubles	2000	1200	720	360	180	90	0	N/A				
Women's singles	2000	1300	780	430	240	130	70	10	40	30	20	2
Women's doubles	2000	1300	780	430	240	130	10	N/A				

==== Wheelchair points ====
Event	W	F	SF	QF	Round of 16
Singles	800	500	375	200	100
Doubles	800	500	375	100	N/A
Quad singles	800	500	375	200	100
Quad doubles	800	500	375	100	N/A

=== Prize money ===
The 2026 US Open offered a record $108 million in total player compensation, the largest package in tennis history and an increase of 21% from 2025.

The men's and women's singles champions each received $5,500,000, a 10% increase from the $5,000,000 awarded in 2025, while runners-up received $2,800,000. First-round singles players received $140,000, an increase of 27.3% from 2025.

Event	W	F	SF	QF	Round of 16	Round of 32	Round of 64	Round of 128	Q3	Q2	Q1
Singles	$5,500,000	$2,800,000	$1,450,000	$780,000	$480,000	$290,000	$190,000	$140,000	$66,000	$48,000	$32,000
Doubles (per team)	$1,000,000	$500,000	$250,000	$125,000	$80,000	$50,000	$35,000	N/A			
Mixed Doubles (per team)	$1,000,000	$500,000	$250,000	$120,000	$40,000	N/A			N/A	$20,000	$10,000

== Notes ==
Preceded by 2025 US Open	US Open	Succeeded by 2027 US Open
Preceded by 2026 Wimbledon Championships	Grand Slam events	Succeeded by 2027 Australian Open
