= Grand Slam (tennis) =

Tennis term for winning all four major championships

The Grand Slam in tennis is the achievement of winning all four major championships in one discipline in a calendar year. In doubles, a Grand Slam may be achieved as a team or as an individual with different partners. Winning all four major championships consecutively but not within the same calendar year is referred to as a "non-calendar-year Grand Slam", while winning the four majors at any point during the course of a career is known as a "Career Grand Slam".

The term Grand Slam is also attributed to the Grand Slam tournaments, referred to as Majors, and they are the world's four most important annual professional tennis tournaments. They offer the most ranking points, prize money, public and media attention, the greatest strength and size of the field and, in recent years, the longest matches for men (best of five sets, best of three for the women). The tournaments are overseen by World Tennis, rather than the separate men's and women's tour organizing bodies, the Association of Tennis Professionals (ATP) and Women's Tennis Association (WTA), but both the ATP and WTA award ranking points based on players' performances in them.

The Grand Slam tournaments are the Australian Open in January, the French Open in late May to early June, Wimbledon in late June to early July, and the US Open in late August to early September, with each played over two weeks. The Australian and the US tournaments are played on hard courts, the French on clay court, and Wimbledon on grass court. Wimbledon is the oldest tournament, founded in 1877, followed by the US in 1881, the French in 1891 (major in 1925), and the Australian in 1905, but it was not until 1923 that all four were designated as "Official Championships".

== History ==
The locations of the four major championships.

With the growing popularity of tennis, and with the hopes of unifying the sport's rules internationally, the British and French tennis associations started discussions at their Davis Cup tie, and in October 1912 organized a meeting in Paris, joined by the Australasian, Austrian, Belgian, Spanish, and Swiss associations. They subsequently formed the International Lawn Tennis Federation (ILTF), holding their first meeting in 1913, joined by the Danish, German, Dutch, Russian, South African, and Swedish organizations. Voting rights were divided based on the perceived importance of the individual countries, with Great Britain's Lawn Tennis Association (LTA) receiving the maximum six votes. Three tournaments were established, being designated as "World Championships":

- World Grass Court Championships, played on grass courts.
- World Hard Court Championships, played on clay courts.
- World Covered Court Championships, played on an indoor wood surface.

The LTA was given the perpetual right to organize the World Grass Court Championships, to be held at Wimbledon, and France received permission to stage the World Hard Court Championships until 1916. Anthony Wilding of New Zealand won all three of these World Championships in 1913.

The United States National Lawn Tennis Association (USNLTA) expressed disagreement over the power distribution within the ILTF and the designation of "World Championship" status to the British and French tournaments, and thus initially refused to join the Federation, choosing instead to be bystanders to their meetings. By the 1920s, with the World Covered Court Championships failing to attract top players and the growing success of American and Australian tennis, the ILTF worked to convince the USNLTA to join them, meeting their demand to drop the designation of "World Championships" from all three tournaments in March 1923, which led to the demise of both the World Covered Court Championships and the World Hard Court Championships. A new category of "Official Championships" was created for the national championships of Britain, France, Australia, and the US. By the 1930s, these four tournaments had become well defined as the most prestigious in the sport.

In 1933, Jack Crawford won the Australian, French, and Wimbledon Championships, leaving him just needing to win the last major event of the year, the U.S. Championships, to become the reigning champion of all four major tournaments, a feat described as "a grand slam" by sports columnist Alan J. Gould of The Reading Eagle, and later that year by John Kieran of The New York Times, who stated that if Crawford won at Forest Hills it "would be something like scoring a grand slam on the courts, doubled and vulnerable." The term 'Grand Slam' originates from the card game contract bridge, where it is used for winning all possible tricks. In golf it was used for the first time to describe a total of four wins, specifically Bobby Jones' achievement of winning the four major golf tournaments of the era, which he accomplished in 1930. "Grand Slam" or "Slam" has since also become used to refer to the tournaments individually. The first player to win all four majors in a calendar year and thus complete a Grand Slam was Don Budge in 1938.

At the time, only amateur players were allowed to participate in the Grand Slam and other ILTF-sanctioned tournaments. Amateur standing, regulated by the ILTF alongside its associated national federations, forbade players from receiving prize money, earning pay by teaching tennis, being contracted by promoters and playing paid exhibition matches, though expense payments were allowed along with certain monies from sporting goods companies or other benefactors. Amateurs who "defected" to become professional were banned from competing in amateur tournaments and dropped from their national associations. The first major professional tour was established in 1926 by promoter C. C. Pyle with a troupe of American and French players, most notably Suzanne Lenglen, playing exhibition matches to paying audiences.

Over the next decades many other head-to-head tours were run and professional tournaments established, with three, the U.S. Pro Tennis Championships, French Pro Championship and Wembley Championships, standing out, and considered to have been the professional majors. By the 1950s, largely due to efforts of player/promoter Jack Kramer, this lucrative parallel circuit was luring in most of the star amateurs on the men's side, much to the ire of the ILTF and organizers of the Grand Slam tournaments. It was an open secret that the top players who remained as amateurs were receiving undeclared under-the-table payments from tournament promoters, an arrangement tolerated by their national tennis associations to dissuade them from joining the pro ranks and secure their availability for the majors and Davis Cup. This system was derisively referred to as 'shamateurism' that was seen as undermining the integrity of the sport. Ramanathan Krishnan and Roy Emerson, for example declined large contract offers from the professional promoters, with the latter stating that he was better paid in the amateur circuit.

Tensions over this status quo, which had been building for decades, finally came to a head in 1967. The first tournament open to professional tennis players played on Centre Court at Wimbledon, the Wimbledon Pro, was staged by the All England Lawn Tennis Club in August, offering a prize fund of US$45,000. The tournament was deemed very successful, with packed crowds and the play seen as being of higher quality than the amateur-only Wimbledon final held two weeks earlier. This success in combination with large signings of top players to two new professional tours—World Championship Tennis and the National Tennis League—convinced the LTA on the need for open tennis. After a British proposal for this at the annual ILTF meeting was voted down, the LTA revolted, and in its own annual meeting in December it voted overwhelmingly to admit players of all statuses to the 1968 Wimbledon Championships and other future tournaments in Britain, "come hell or high water". The eventual backing of the USNLTA that came after a February 1968 vote forced the ILTF to yield and allow each nation to determine its own legislation regarding amateur and professional players, which it voted for in a special meeting in March 1968. This marked the start of the Open Era of tennis, with its first tournament, the 1968 British Hard Court Championships, beginning three weeks later on 22 April in Bournemouth, England, while the first open Grand Slam tournament, the 1968 French Open, was held in May.

Even after the advent of the Open Era, players including John McEnroe and Chris Evert have pointed out that skipping the Australian Open was the norm because of the travelling distance involved and the inconvenient dates close to Christmas and New Year. There were also the contracted professional players who had to skip some major events like the French Open in the 1970s because they were committed to the more profitable pro circuits. In one case, Australian players including Rod Laver, Ken Rosewall and Roy Emerson who had contracts with George MacCall's National Tennis League were prevented from participating in the 1970 Australian Open because the financial guarantees were deemed insufficient.

Although it has been possible to complete a Grand Slam in most years and most disciplines since 1925, it was not possible from 1940 to 1945 because of interruptions at Wimbledon, the Australian and French Championships due to World War II, the years from 1970 to 1985 when there was no Australian tournament in mixed doubles, 1986 when there was no Australian Open, and 2020 when Wimbledon was cancelled due to the COVID-19 pandemic.

== Tournaments ==
The individual Grand Slam tournaments consist of the four majors: Australian Open, French Open, Wimbledon, and the US Open. These four individual tournaments are sometimes shortened to Grand Slams, or even just Slams.

Event	Editions	Began	Venue	Surface	Draw sizes	Format	Deciding set rule	Date (2 weeks)	Prize money	Media coverage
Australian Open (Note: Australasian Championships (1905–26), Australian Championships (1927–68).)	114	1905 (Note: First women's event was in 1922.)	Melbourne Park, Melbourne	Hard (Note: Grass (1905–1987).)	Men's & women's events: 128: singles; 64: doubles; 32: mixed doubles; 16: mixed doubles (US Open); 16: wheelchair singles; 8: wheelchair doubles; Junior events: 64 singles, 32 doubles	Best of five sets: Men's singles; Best of three sets: Women's singles; Doubles events; Wheelchair events; Junior events	10-point tiebreaker at 6–6 (since 2019); 7-point tiebreaker at 6–6 (1980–1982)	18 Jan–1 Feb 2026	A$111,500,000	TNT Sports (UK); ESPN (US)
French Open (Note: Championnat de France (1891–1924), Internationaux de France de Tennis (since 1925), Tournoi de Roland-Garros, alternate name (since 1928).)	96	1925 (Note: Though the French Championships began in 1891, it was not a major international event until 1925. First women's event was in 1897.)	Stade Roland Garros, Paris	Clay	Men's & women's events: 128: singles; 64: doubles; 32: mixed doubles; 16: mixed doubles (US Open); 16: wheelchair singles; 8: wheelchair doubles; Junior events: 64 singles, 32 doubles	Best of five sets: Men's singles; Best of three sets: Women's singles; Doubles events; Wheelchair events; Junior events	10-point tiebreaker at 6–6 (since 2022)	24 May–7 Jun 2026	€56,352,000	TNT Sports (UK); TNT Sports (US)
Wimbledon (Note: The Championships (since 1877).)	139	1877 (Note: First women's event was in 1884.)	All England Lawn Tennis and Croquet Club, London	Grass	Men's & women's events: 128: singles; 64: doubles; 32: mixed doubles; 16: mixed doubles (US Open); 16: wheelchair singles; 8: wheelchair doubles; Junior events: 64 singles, 32 doubles	Best of five sets: Men's singles; Best of three sets: Women's singles; Doubles events; Wheelchair events; Junior events	10-point tiebreaker at 6–6 (since 2022), 7-point tiebreaker at 12–12 (2019–2021)	29 Jun–12 Jul 2026	£53,550,000	BBC (UK); ESPN (US)
US Open (Note: U.S. National Championship (1881–1967))	146	1881 (Note: First women's event was in 1887.)	USTA Billie Jean King National Tennis Center, New York	Hard (Note: Grass (1881–1974), Clay (1975–1977).)	Men's & women's events: 128: singles; 64: doubles; 32: mixed doubles; 16: mixed doubles (US Open); 16: wheelchair singles; 8: wheelchair doubles; Junior events: 64 singles, 32 doubles	Best of five sets: Men's singles; Best of three sets: Women's singles; Doubles events; Wheelchair events; Junior events	10-point tiebreaker at 6–6 (since 2022), 7-point tiebreaker at 6–6 (1975–2021), 5-point sudden death tiebreaker at 6–6 (1970–1974)	23 Aug–13 Sept 2026	US$65,000,020	Sky Sports (UK); ESPN (US)

=== Australian Open ===
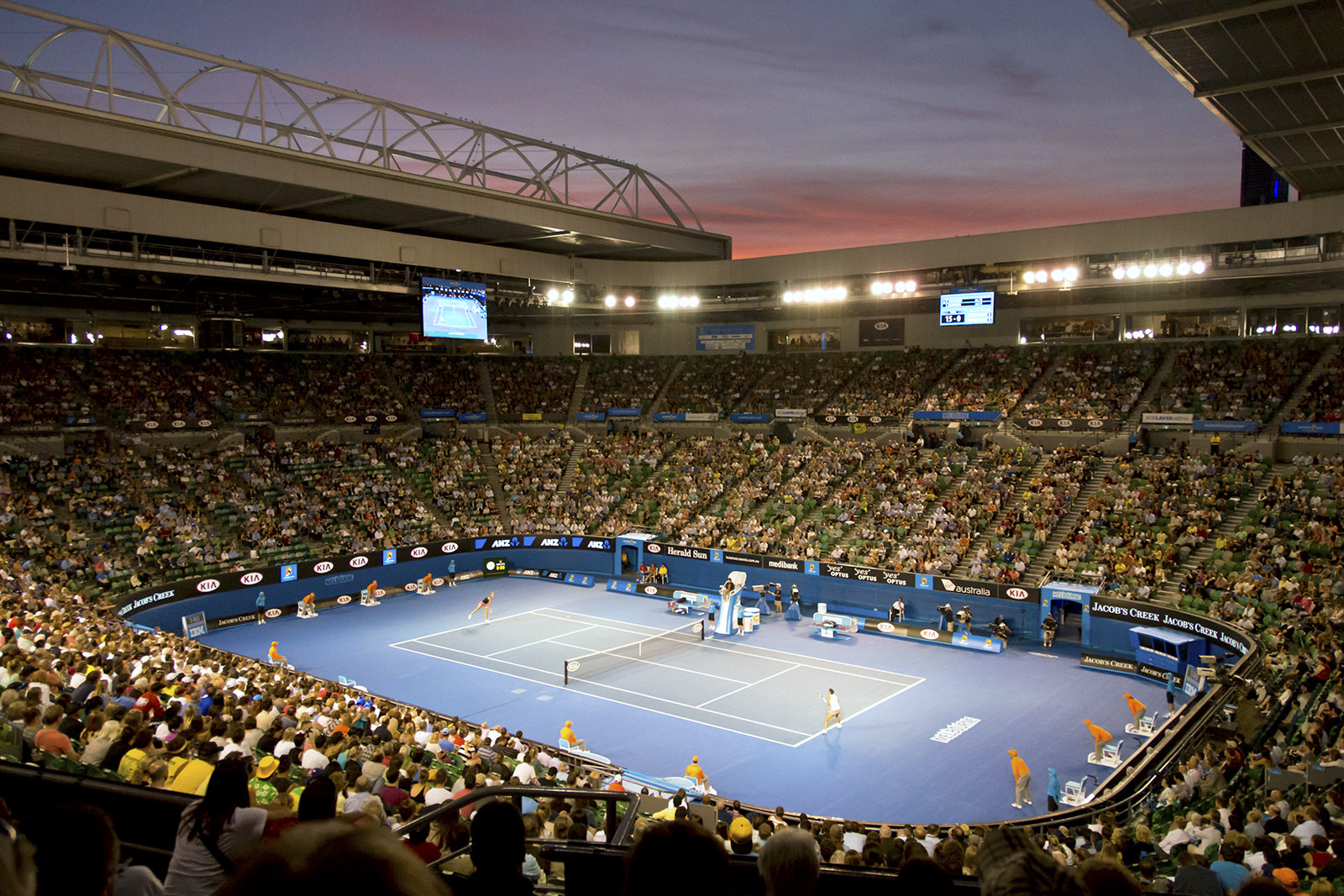
Rod Laver Arena, Melbourne Park.

The Australian Open is the first Grand Slam tournament of the year, played annually in late January and early February. (Note: Since 1987. Dates fluctuated between the start and end of the year before then.) The inaugural edition took place in November 1905 on the grass courts of the Warehouseman's Cricket Ground in Melbourne, Australia. It was held as the Australasian Championships until 1927 and thereafter as the Australian Championships until the onset of the Open Era in 1969, passing through various venues in Australia and New Zealand before settling at the Kooyong Lawn Tennis Club in Melbourne between 1972 and 1987. Since 1988, it has been played on the hard courts of the Melbourne Park sports complex, which currently uses GreenSet as its court manufacturer.

Managed by Tennis Australia, formerly the Lawn Tennis Association of Australia (LTAA), the tournament struggled until the mid-1980s to attract the top international players due to its distance from Europe and America and proximity to the Christmas and holiday season, but it has since grown to become one of the biggest sporting events in the Southern Hemisphere and the highest attended Grand Slam tournament, with more than 1,020,000 people attending the 2024 edition. Nicknamed the "Happy Slam" and billed as "the Grand Slam of Asia/Pacific", it has become known for its modernity and innovation, being the first Grand Slam tournament to feature indoor play and install retractable roofs on its main courts, the first to schedule night-time men's singles finals, and the first to substitute electronic line calling for line judges, using an expanded version of the Hawk-Eye technology known as "Hawk-Eye Live".

The tournament was designated a major championship by the International Lawn Tennis Federation in 1923. Today its draw hosts 256 singles players, 128 doubles teams, and 32 mixed doubles teams, with the total prize money for the 2025 tournament being A$96,500,000.

=== French Open ===
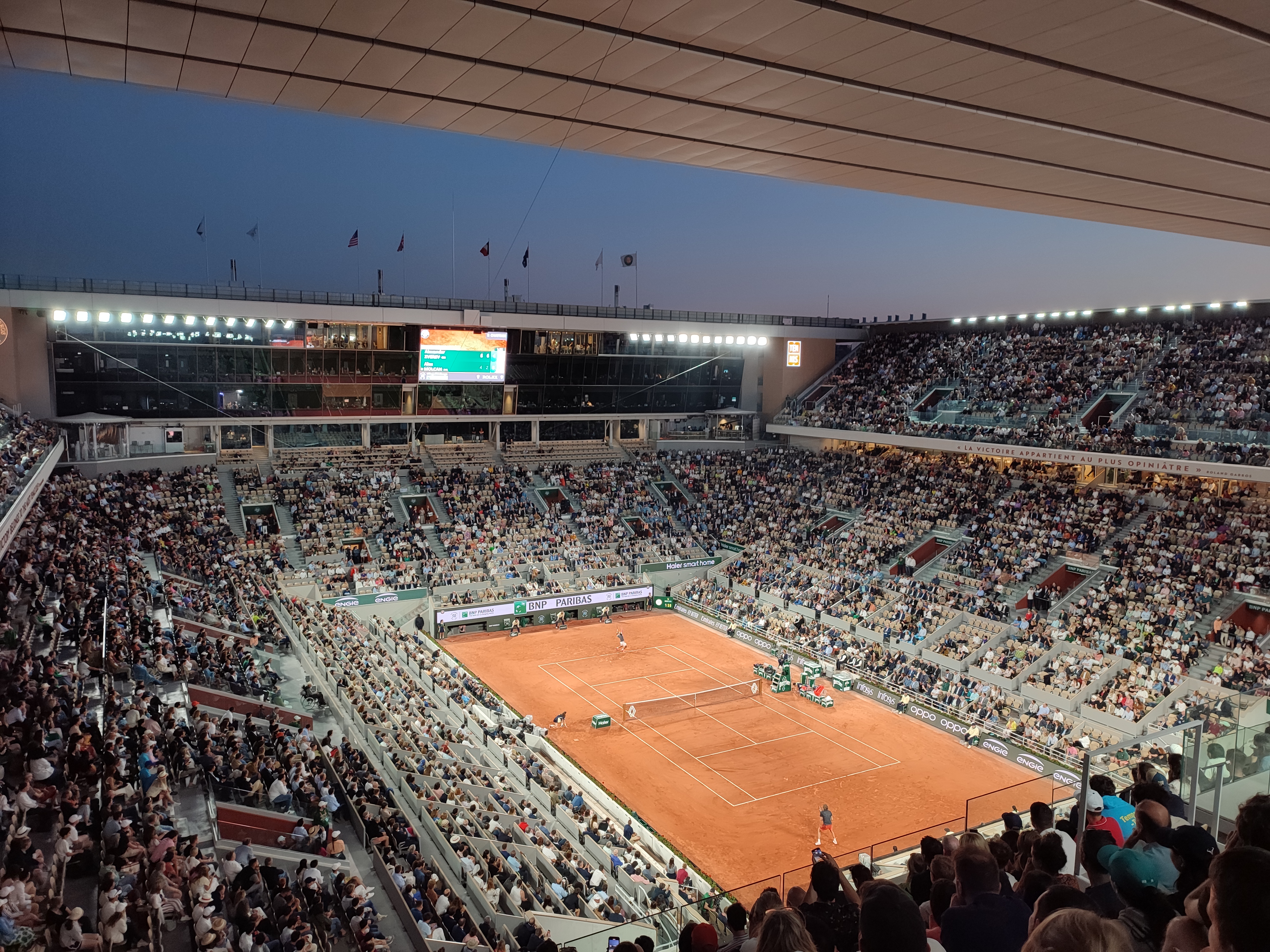
Court Philippe Chatrier, Stade Roland Garros.

The French Open, also known as Roland Garros, is the second Grand Slam tournament of the year, played annually in late May and early June. A French championships closed event (restricted to members of French clubs) was first held in 1891 on the sand courts of the Societé de Sport de Île de Puteaux, in Puteaux, Île-de-France, (Note: Some sources state the 1891 venue was Racing Club de France, Paris.) and changed venues over the years. In 1925 the French championships became a Grand Slam event for the first time. It was open to all amateurs and since 1928 has been held on clay courts at the Stade Roland-Garros in Paris, France. The venue is named "Roland Garros" after the pioneering French aviator.

Organized by the Fédération française de tennis (FFT), formerly known as the Fédération Française de Lawn Tennis until 1976, the French Open is the only Grand Slam tournament played on a red clay surface. It is generally considered to be the most physically demanding tennis tournament in the world.

The World Hard Court Championships was considered the premier clay championship in France from 1912–1923 (apart from one year held in Belgium) as it admitted international competitors, and it is therefore often seen as the true precursor to the French Open before 1925. The French championships was first held as an International Lawn Tennis Federation–sanctioned major championship in 1925.

Today, it has draws that host 256 singles players, 128 doubles teams and 32 mixed doubles teams, with the total prize money for the 2025 tournament being €56,352,000. The 2018 edition saw a record attendance of 480,575 spectators.

=== Wimbledon ===
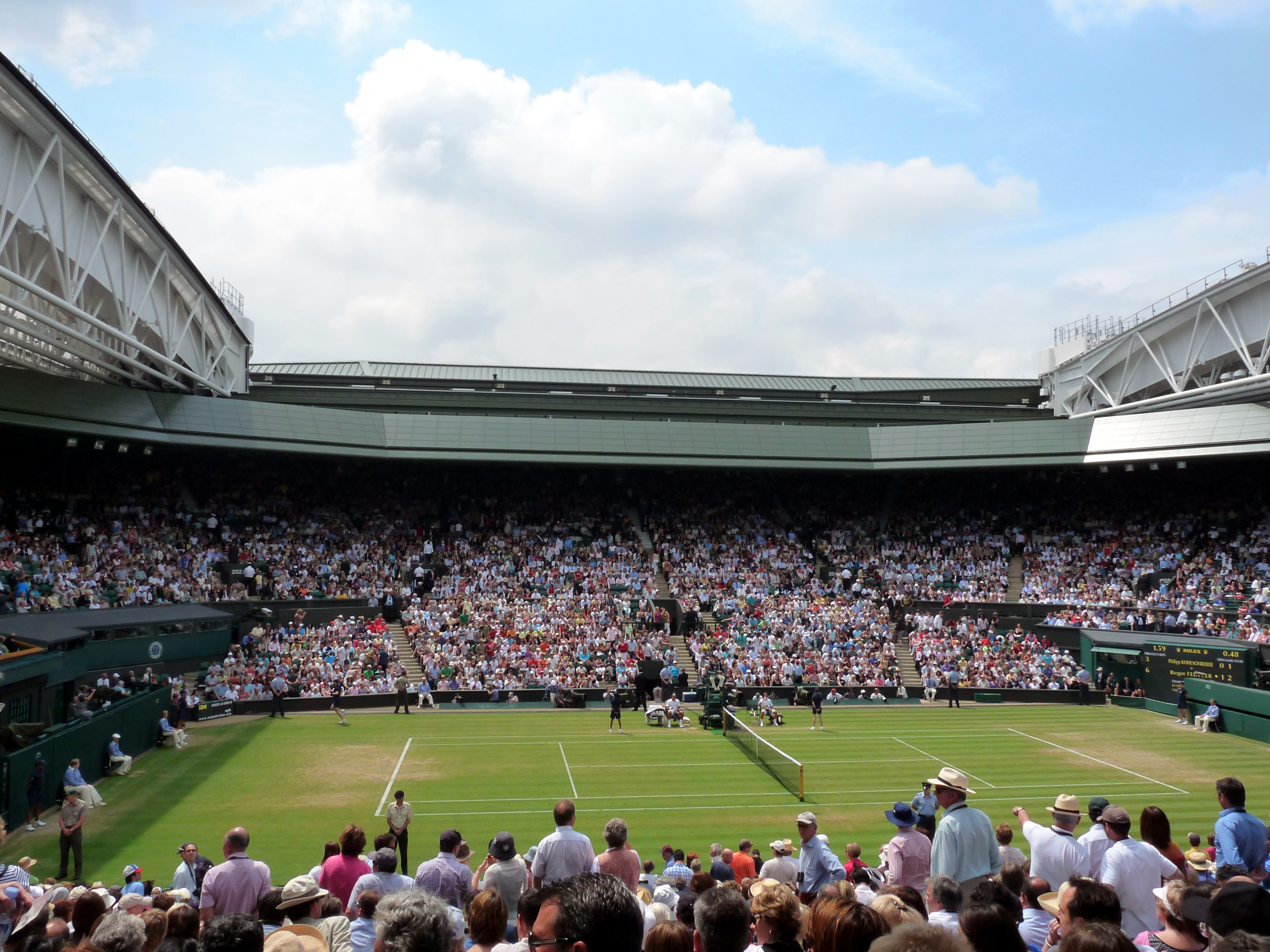
Centre Court, All England Lawn Tennis and Croquet Club.

The Wimbledon Championships, commonly known as Wimbledon, is the third Grand Slam tournament of the year, played annually in late June and early July. It was first held in 1877 at the All England Lawn Tennis and Croquet Club, at the time located off Nursery Road in Wimbledon, London, England. The tournament has always been contested at this club, which moved to its present site off Church Road in 1922 in order to increase its attendance capacity.

Wimbledon is organized by a committee of management consisting of 19 members, with 12 being club members and the remaining seven nominated by the Lawn Tennis Association (LTA). As the world's oldest tennis event, it is widely regarded as the most prestigious tennis tournament, and it is known for its commitment to longstanding traditions and guidelines. It is one of few tournaments and the only Grand Slam event that is still played on grass courts, tennis's original surface, and where "lawn tennis" originated in the 1800s. Players are required to wear all-white attire during matches, and they are referred to as "Gentlemen" and "Ladies". There is also a tradition where the players are asked to bow or curtsy towards the Royal Box upon entering or leaving Centre Court when either the Prince of Wales or the monarch are present.

The tournament was given the title "World Grass Court Championships" by the International Lawn Tennis Federation between 1912 and 1923, and was designated a major championship following the abolition of the three ILTF World Championships. Since 1937, the BBC has broadcast the tournament on television in the United Kingdom, with the finals shown live and in full on television in the country each year. The BBC's broadcast of the 1967 edition was among the first colour television broadcasts in the UK.

Today, the event has draws that host 256 singles players, 128 doubles teams and 32 mixed doubles teams, with the total prize money for the 2025 tournament being £53,500,000, and 500,397 people attending the 2019 edition. The tournament has some of the longest running sponsorships in sports history, having been associated with Slazenger since 1902, and with the Robinsons fruit drink brand since 1935.

=== US Open ===
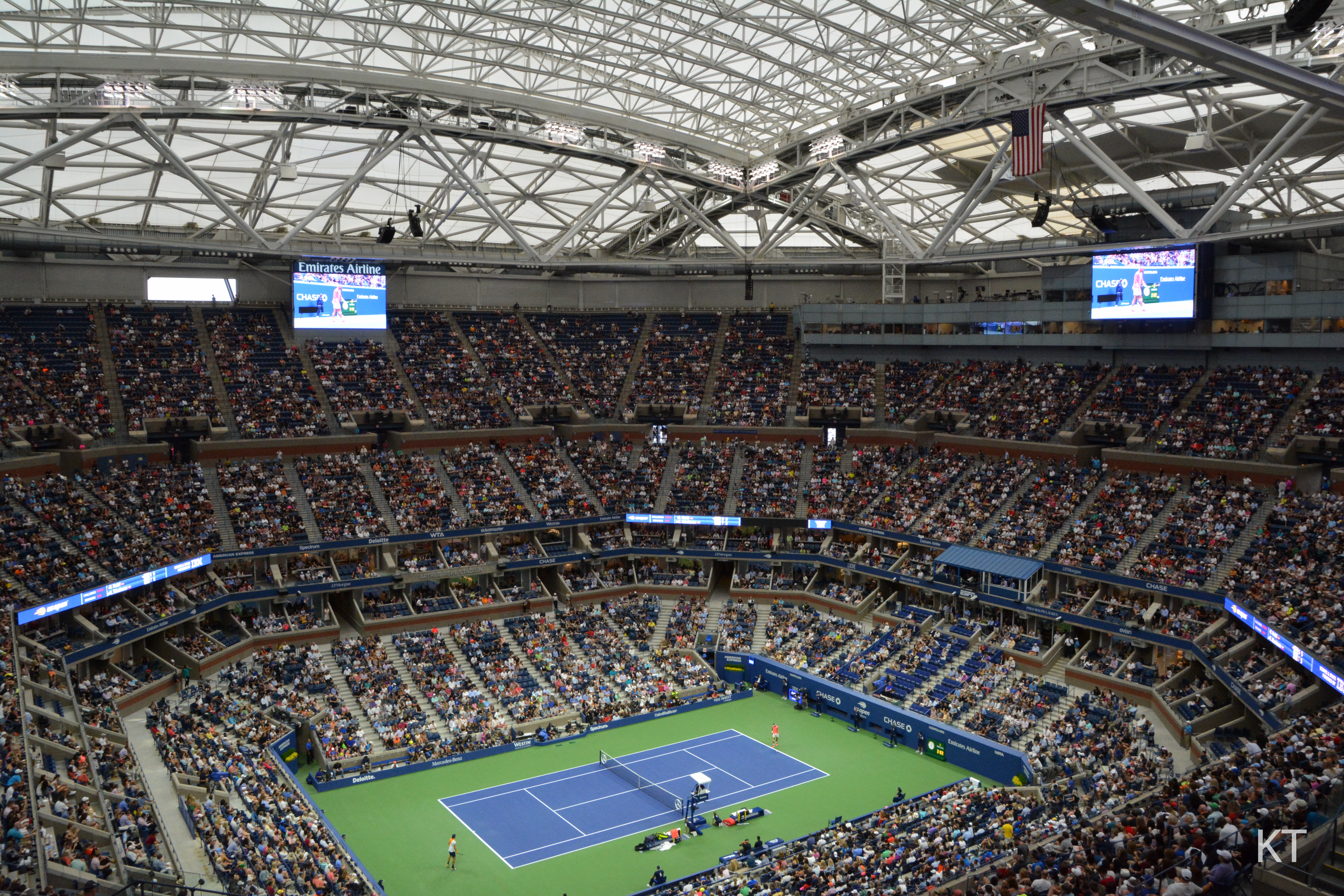
Arthur Ashe Stadium, USTA Billie Jean King National Tennis Center.

The US Open is the fourth and final Grand Slam tournament of the year, played annually in late August and early September. It was first held in August 1881 on grass courts at the Newport Casino in Newport, Rhode Island, United States. The tournament changed venues in its early years, with each discipline continuing to be held separately at various venues until 1923, when the tournament settled at the West Side Tennis Club in Forest Hills, Queens, New York City. In 1978, it moved to the hardcourts of the USTA Billie Jean King National Tennis Center in Flushing Meadows, Queens, where it has been contested ever since.

Organized by the United States Tennis Association (USTA), previously known as the United States National Lawn Tennis Association (USNLTA) until 1920, and as the United States Lawn Tennis Association (USLTA) until 1975, it is the only Grand Slam tournament to have been played every year since its inception. In 1997, Arthur Ashe Stadium, the largest tennis stadium in the world with a capacity of 23,771 spectators, was opened. It is named after Arthur Ashe, the winner of the 1968 tournament—the first in which professionals were allowed to compete.

Over the years, the tournament has pioneered changes that other tournaments later adopted, including the introduction of a tiebreak system to decide the outcome of sets tied at 6–6 in 1970, being the first Grand Slam tournament to award equal prize money to the men's and women's events in 1975, the installation of floodlights in 1975 in order to allow matches to be played at night, and the introduction of instant replay reviews of line calls using the Hawk-Eye computer system in 2006.

The ILTF officially designated it as a major tournament in 1923. Today, the event has draws that host 256 singles players, 128 doubles teams and 32 mixed doubles teams, with the total prize money for the 2020 tournament being US$53,400,000, and a US television viewership of 700,000. From 2004–2023, the tournament was preceded by the US Open Series, composed of North American hardcourt professional tournaments that lead up to and culminate with the US Open itself. The season was organized by the USTA as a way to focus more attention on American tennis tournaments by getting more of them on domestic television.

== Grand Slam ==
A Grand Slam (sometimes called a Calendar-year Grand Slam, Calendar Grand Slam, or Calendar Slam) is the achievement of winning the Australian Open, French Open, Wimbledon, and US Open in the same year. Margaret Court is the only player to complete a Grand Slam in two disciplines, singles and mixed doubles (twice), while wheelchair players Diede de Groot and Dylan Alcott have completed one in both the singles and doubles disciplines of their respective classes.

The following is a list of players that achieved it.

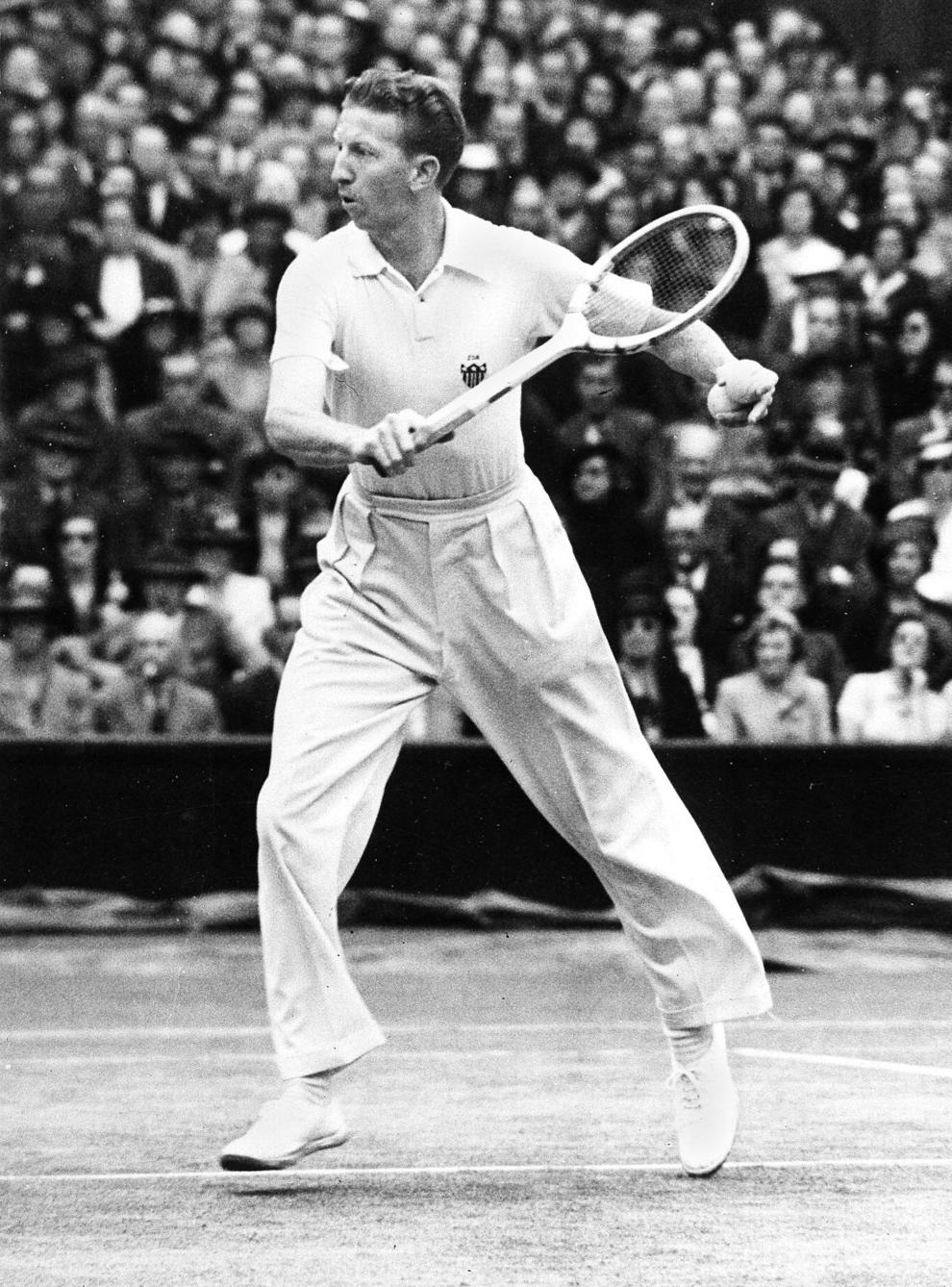
Don Budge, men's singles in 1938.

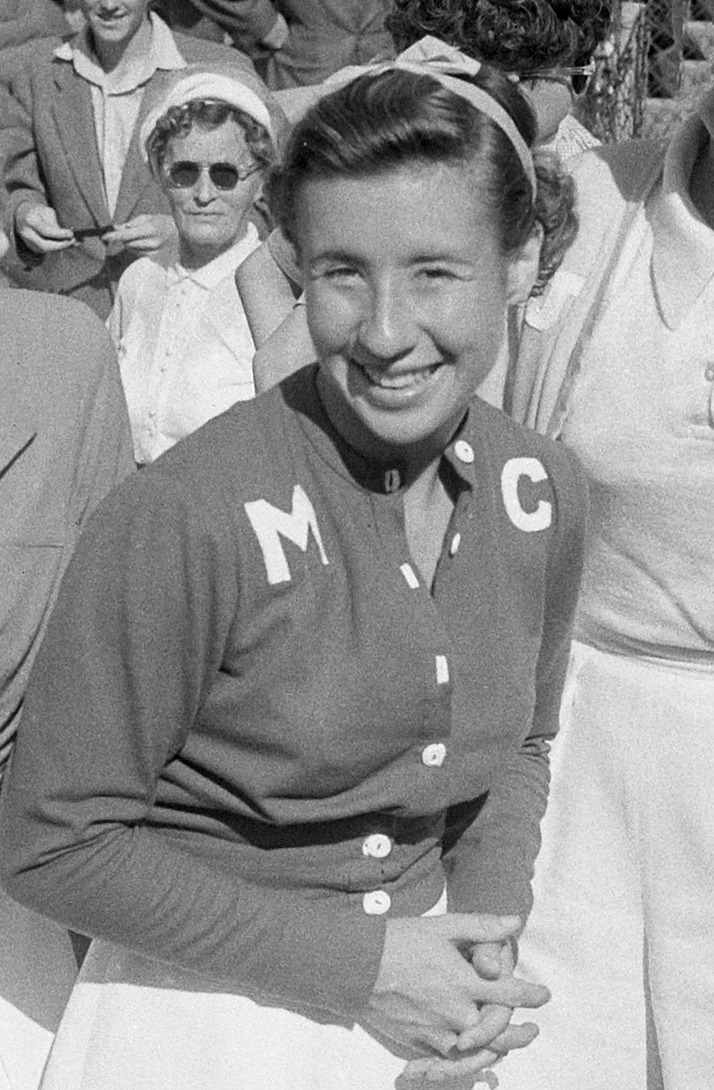
Maureen Connolly, women's singles in 1953.

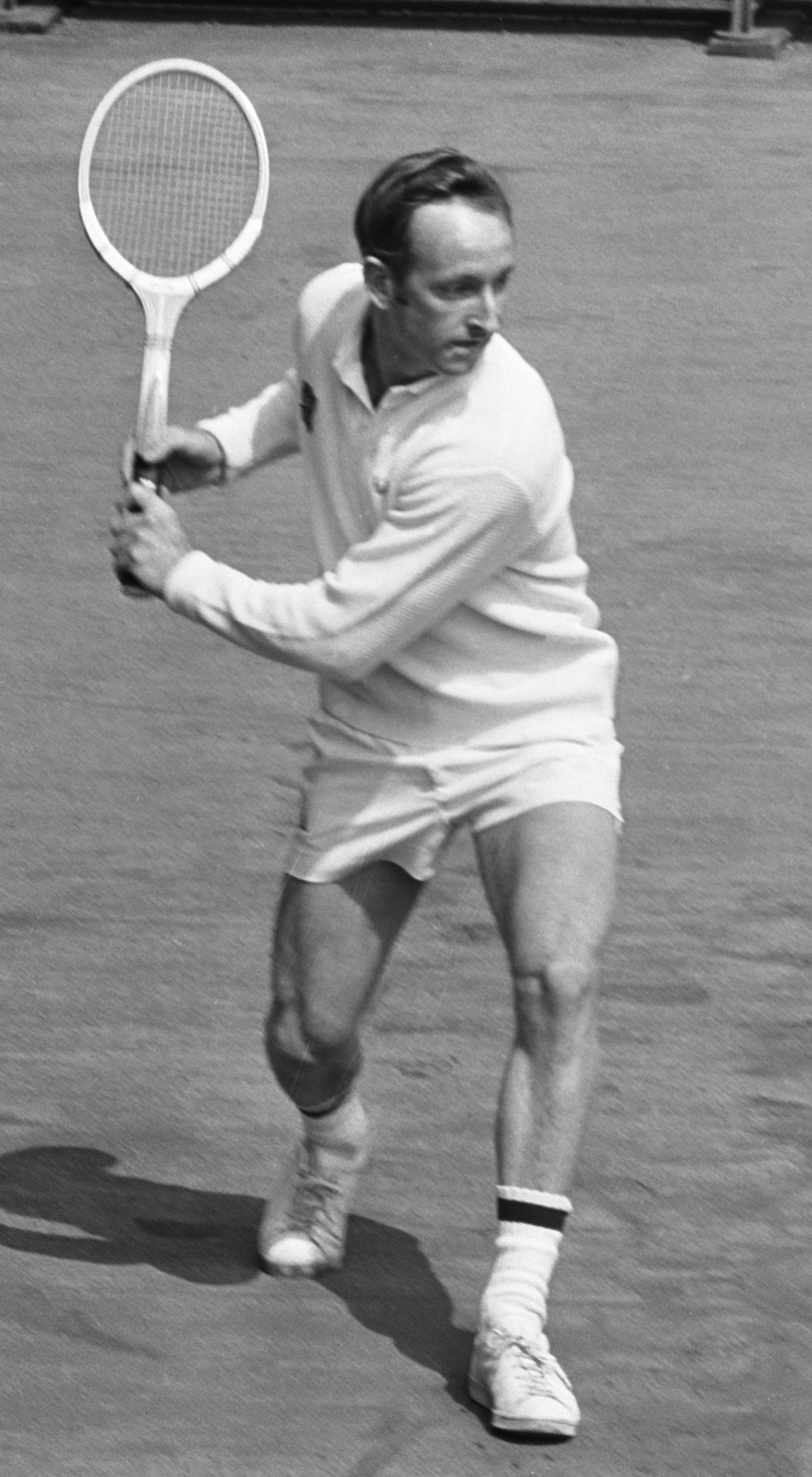
Rod Laver, men's singles in 1962 and 1969.

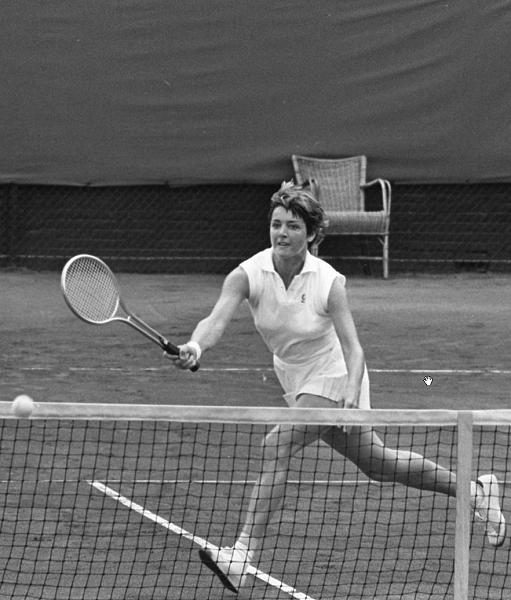
Margaret Court, women's singles in 1970.

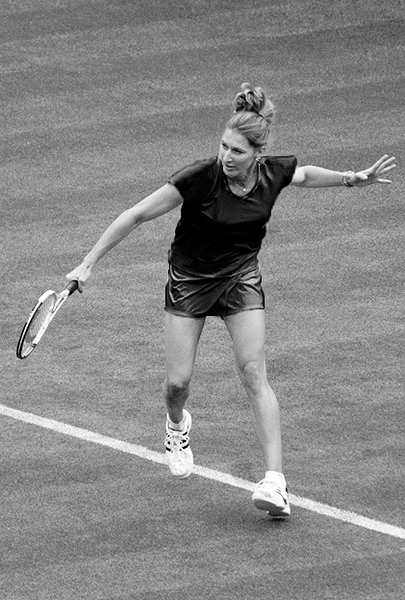
Steffi Graf, women's singles in 1988.

AO Australian Open	WIM Wimbledon
FO French Open	USO US Open

No.	Year	Player	Discipline	Major				Notes	Ref.
1	1938	Don Budge	Men's singles	AO	FO	WIM	USO	(Note: Part of 6 consecutive titles.)	
2	1951	Ken McGregor	Men's doubles	AO	FO	WIM	USO	(Note: Part of 7 consecutive titles.)	
2	1951	Frank Sedgman	Men's doubles	AO	FO	WIM	USO	(Note: Part of 8 consecutive titles with John Bromwich in 1950 U.S. Championships.)	
4	1953	Maureen Connolly	Women's singles	AO	FO	WIM	USO		
5	1960	Maria Bueno	Women's doubles	AO	FO	WIM	USO	(Note: Partnered with Christine Truman and Darlene Hard.)	
6	1962	Rod Laver	Men's singles	AO	FO	WIM	USO		
7	1963	Margaret Court	Mixed doubles	AO	FO	WIM	USO	(Note: Part of 7 consecutive titles with Fred Stolle in 1962 U.S. Championships.)	
7	1963	Ken Fletcher	Mixed doubles	AO	FO	WIM	USO		
9	1965	Margaret Court (2)	Mixed doubles	AO	FO	WIM	USO	(Note: Part of 5 consecutive titles with John Newcombe, Ken Fletcher and Fred Stolle.)	
10	1967	Owen Davidson	Mixed doubles	AO	FO	WIM	USO	(Note: Part of 5 consecutive titles with Donna Floyd, Lesley Turner Bowrey and Billie Jean King.)	
11	1969	Rod Laver (2)	Men's singles	AO	FO	WIM	USO		
12	1970	Margaret Court (3)	Women's singles	AO	FO	WIM	USO		
13	1983	Stefan Edberg	Boys' singles	FO	WIM	USO	AO		
14	1984	Martina Navratilova	Women's doubles	FO	WIM	USO	AO	(Note: Part of 8 consecutive titles.)	
14	1984	Pam Shriver	Women's doubles	FO	WIM	USO	AO	(Note: Part of 8 consecutive titles.)	
16	1988	Steffi Graf	Women's singles	AO	FO	WIM	USO	(Note: Part of 5 consecutive titles.)	
17	1998	Martina Hingis	Women's doubles	AO	FO	WIM	USO	(Note: Part of 5 consecutive titles with Mirjana Lučić, Jana Novotná and Anna Kournikova.)	

== Current champions ==
Event		Australian Open	French Open	Wimbledon	US Open
Event		2026	2026	2026	2026
Singles	Men	(Spain) Carlos Alcaraz	(Germany) Alexander Zverev	(Italy) Jannik Sinner	(Germany) Alexander Zverev
Singles	Women	(Kazakhstan) Elena Rybakina	Mirra Andreeva (Note: On 1 March 2022, the WTA announced that players from Russia and Belarus would not be allowed to compete under the name or flag of Russia or Belarus following the 2022 Russian invasion of Ukraine.)	(Czech Republic) Linda Nosková	(Kazakhstan) Elena Rybakina
Doubles	Men	(United States) Christian Harrison (United Kingdom) Neal Skupski	(Spain) Marcel Granollers (Argentina) Horacio Zeballos	(Finland) Harri Heliövaara (United Kingdom) Henry Patten	(United States) Christian Harrison (United Kingdom) Neal Skupski
Doubles	Women	(Belgium) Elise Mertens (China) Zhang Shuai	(Czech Republic) Kateřina Siniaková (United States) Taylor Townsend	(China) Guo Hanyu (France) Kristina Mladenovic	(Czech Republic) Kateřina Siniaková (United States) Taylor Townsend
Doubles	Mixed	(Australia) Olivia Gadecki (Australia) John Peers	(Italy) Sara Errani (Italy) Andrea Vavassori	(El Salvador) Marcelo Arévalo (Latvia) Jeļena Ostapenko	(Czech Republic) Jakub Menšík (Czech Republic) Karolína Muchová
Wheelchair singles	Men	(Japan) Tokito Oda	(Japan) Tokito Oda	(Japan) Tokito Oda	(United Kingdom) Alfie Hewett
Wheelchair singles	Women	(China) Li Xiaohui	(Netherlands) Diede de Groot	(Japan) Yui Kamiji	(Japan) Yui Kamiji
Wheelchair singles	Quad	(Netherlands) Niels Vink	(Netherlands) Niels Vink	(Netherlands) Niels Vink	(Netherlands) Niels Vink
Wheelchair doubles	Men	(Argentina) Gustavo Fernández (Japan) Tokito Oda	(United Kingdom) Alfie Hewett (United Kingdom) Gordon Reid	(United Kingdom) Alfie Hewett (United Kingdom) Gordon Reid	(United Kingdom) Alfie Hewett (United Kingdom) Gordon Reid
Wheelchair doubles	Women	(China) Li Xiaohui (China) Wang Ziying	(Japan) Yui Kamiji (China) Zhu Zhenzhen	(Japan) Yui Kamiji (China) Zhu Zhenzhen	(Japan) Yui Kamiji (China) Zhu Zhenzhen
Wheelchair doubles	Quad	(Israel) Guy Sasson (Netherlands) Niels Vink	(Israel) Guy Sasson (Netherlands) Niels Vink	(Israel) Guy Sasson (Netherlands) Niels Vink	(Netherlands) Sam Schröder (Australia) Jin Woodman
Junior singles	Boys	(Slovenia) Žiga Šeško	(Brazil) Luís Guto Miguel	(United States) Jordan Lee	(United States) Marcel Latak
Junior singles	Girls	(France) Ksenia Efremova	Alisa Oktiabreva	Anna Pushkareva	(China) Sun Xinran
Junior doubles	Boys	(South Africa) Connor Doig (Bulgaria) Dimitar Kisimov	(Germany) Jamie Mackenzie (Germany) Vincent Reisach	(Brazil) Luís Guto Miguel (Slovenia) Žiga Šeško	(France) Aaron Gabet (Spain) Valentín González-Galiño
Junior doubles	Girls	(Czech Republic) Alena Kovačková (Czech Republic) Jana Kovačková	(Czech Republic) Jana Kovačková (Czech Republic) Kateřina Zajíčková	(Czech Republic) Jana Kovačková (Czech Republic) Kateřina Zajíčková	(United States) Annika Penickova (United States) Kristina Penickova
Junior wheelchair singles	Boys	(Belgium) Alexander Lantermann	(United Kingdom) Matthew Knoesen	not held	(United Kingdom) Matthew Knoesen
Junior wheelchair singles	Girls	(Belgium) Luna Gryp	(Belgium) Luna Gryp	not held	(Japan) Seira Matsuoka
Junior wheelchair doubles	Boys	(United Kingdom) Lucas John De Gouveia (Belgium) Alexander Lantermann	(United Kingdom) Matthew Knoesen (Belgium) Alexander Lantermann	not held	(Japan) Hirofumi Inoue (United Kingdom) Matthew Knoesen
Junior wheelchair doubles	Girls	(United Kingdom) Lucy Foyster (Japan) Seira Matsuoka	(Belgium) Luna Gryp (Japan) Seira Matsuoka	not held	(Colombia) Paula Michelle López Meza (Japan) Seira Matsuoka

=== Former champions ===
==== Per discipline ====
Professional

- Men's singles (Chronological)
- Women's singles (Chronological)
- Men's doubles
- Women's doubles
- Mixed doubles

Junior

- Boys' singles
- Girls' singles
- Boys' doubles
- Girls' doubles

Wheelchair

- Men's singles
- Women's singles
- Quad singles
- Men's doubles
- Women's doubles
- Quad doubles

Junior Wheelchair

- Boys' singles
- Girls' singles
- Boys' doubles
- Girls' doubles

==== Singles finals ====
- Men
- Women

== Related concepts ==
=== Non-calendar-year Grand Slam ===
In 1982, the International Tennis Federation (ITF) began offering a $1 million bonus to any singles player to win the four majors consecutively regardless the tournaments order of winning them while the Men's International Professional Tennis Council, which was the governing body of men's professional tennis at the time, stated that 'Grand Slam' need not necessarily be won in the same year. This revision by the Council and reportedly the ITF was approved by the representatives of the four Grand Slam tournaments at Wimbledon. Neil Amdur and Allison Danzig of the New York Times both criticised the changed definition of the term Grand Slam, whereas in 1985 Hal Bock of Associated Press backed the change. Despite newspaper reports claiming that ITF President Philippe Chatrier had said "the four big events no longer have to be won in the same calendar year for a player to be recognized as Grand Slam champion", ITF General Secretary David Gray in a 1983 letter claimed that it was never the intention of ITF to alter anything regarding the definition of the classic Grand Slam:

There seems to be some confusion. The ITF's only initiative in this matter has been the organisation of the offer of a bonus of $1 million to any player who holds all four Grand Slam titles simultaneously ... Despite all that we have read on this matter, it has never been my Committee of Management's intention to alter the basis of the classic Grand Slam i.e., the capture of all four titles in a year.

When Martina Navratilova won the 1984 French Open and became the reigning champion of all four women's singles discipline, she was the first player to receive the bonus prize in recognition of her achievement. Some media outlets said that she had won a Grand Slam. Curry Kirkpatrick of Sports Illustrated wrote "Whether the Slam was Grand or Bland or a commercial sham tainted with an asterisk the size of a tennis ball, Martina Navratilova finally did it."

When Rafael Nadal was on the verge of completing a non-calendar-year Grand Slam at the 2011 Australian Open, one writer observed, "Most traditionalists insist that the 'Grand Slam' should refer only to winning all four titles in a calendar year, although the constitution of the International Tennis Federation, the sports governing body, spells out that 'players who hold all four of these titles at the same time achieve the Grand Slam'." In 2012 the ambiguity was resolved, with the ITF's current constitution stating "The Grand Slam titles are the championships of Australia, France, the United States of America and Wimbledon. Players who hold all four of these titles in one calendar year achieve the 'Grand Slam'."

Combining the Grand Slam and the non-calendar-year Grand Slam, only eight singles players on 11 occasions achieved the feat of being the reigning champion of all four majors, three men (Don Budge, Rod Laver, Novak Djokovic) and five women (Maureen Connolly, Margaret Court, Martina Navratilova, Steffi Graf, Serena Williams).

The following list is for those players who achieved a non-calendar-year Grand Slam by holding the four major titles at the same time but not in the calendar year. Players who completed a Grand Slam within the same streak as a non-calendar-year Grand Slam are not included here.

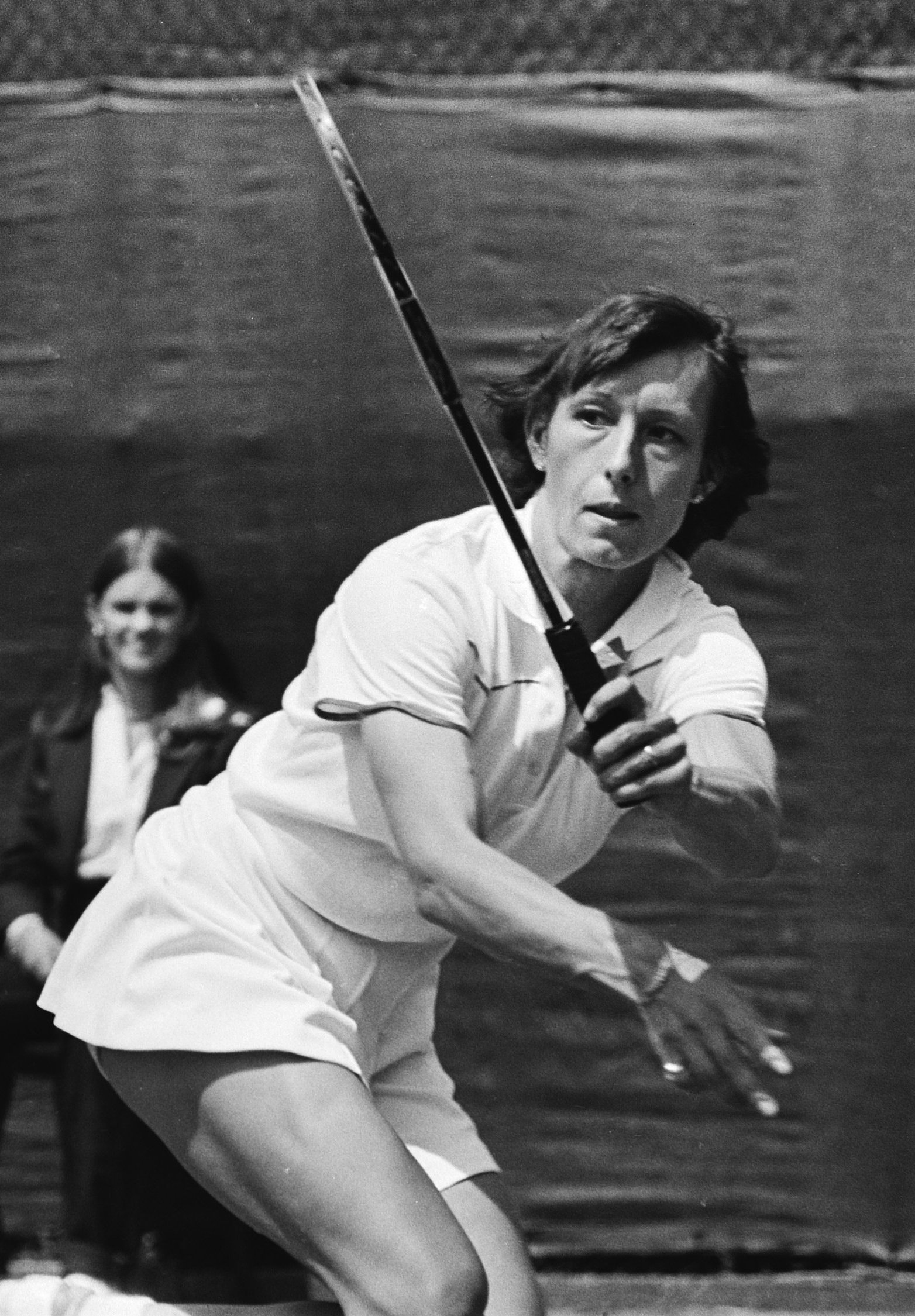
Martina Navratilova completed the feat in singles in 1984.

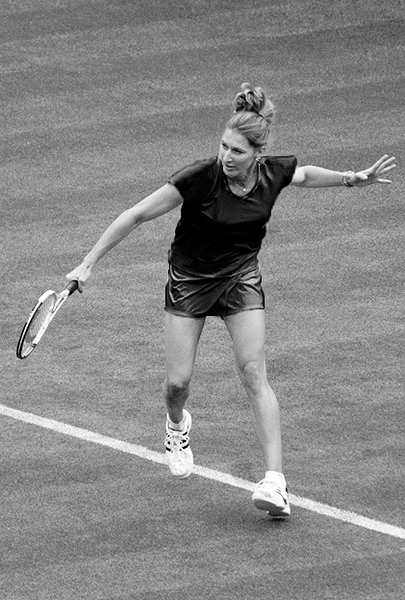
Steffi Graf completed the feat in singles in 1994.

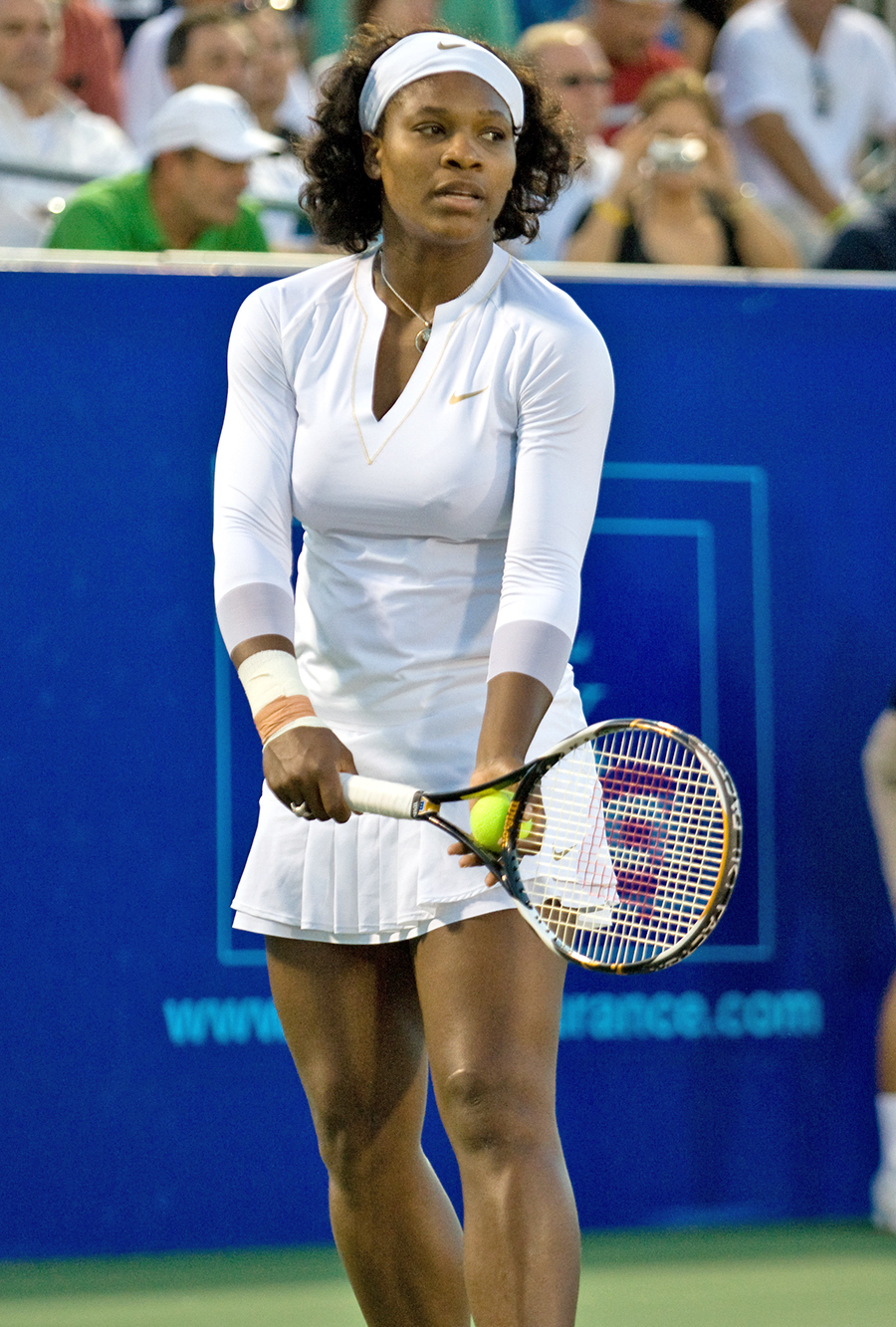
Serena Williams completed the feat in singles in 2003, 2015.

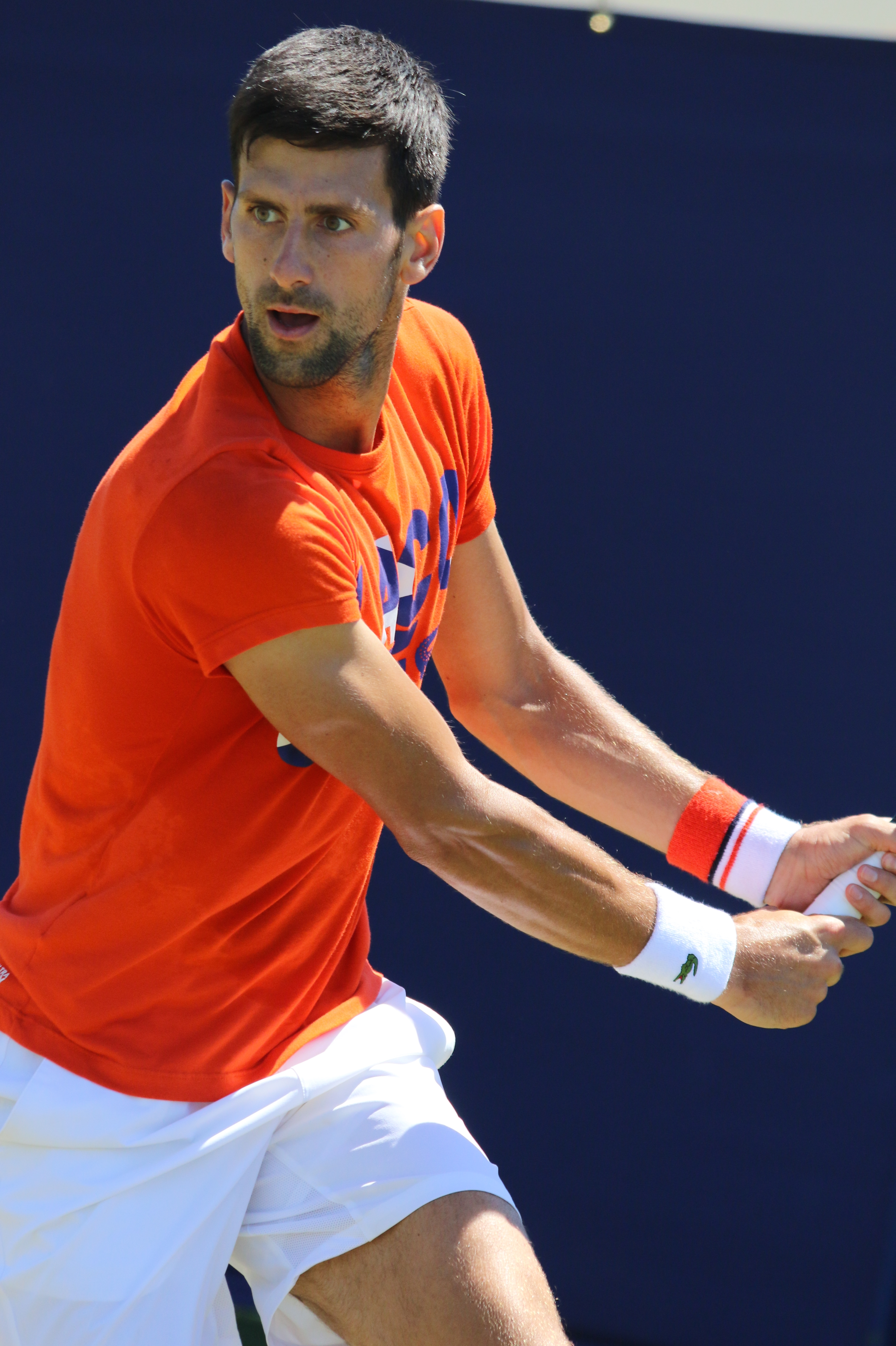
Novak Djokovic completed the feat in singles in 2016.

AO Australian Open	WIM Wimbledon
FO French Open	USO US Open

No.	Player	Discipline	Major				Notes
1	Louise Brough	Women's doubles	1949 FO	1949 WIM	1949 USO	1950 AO	(Note: Partnered with Margaret Osborne duPont and Doris Hart.)
2	Billie Jean King	Mixed doubles	1967 FO	1967 WIM	1967 USO	1968 AO	(Note: Partnered with Owen Davidson and Dick Crealy.)
3	Martina Navratilova	Women's singles	1983 WIM	1983 USO	1983 AO	1984 FO	
4	Martina Navratilova (2)	Women's doubles	1986 WIM	1986 USO	1987 AO	1987 FO	(Note: Part of 5 consecutive titles with Andrea Temesvári in 1986 French Open.)
4	Pam Shriver	Women's doubles	1986 WIM	1986 USO	1987 AO	1987 FO	
6	Gigi Fernández	Women's doubles	1992 FO	1992 WIM	1992 USO	1993 AO	
6	Natasha Zvereva	Women's doubles	1992 FO	1992 WIM	1992 USO	1993 AO	
8	Steffi Graf	Women's singles	1993 FO	1993 WIM	1993 USO	1994 AO	
9	Natasha Zvereva (2)	Women's doubles	1996 USO	1997 AO	1997 FO	1997 WIM	
10	Serena Williams	Women's singles	2002 FO	2002 WIM	2002 USO	2003 AO	
11	Serena Williams (2)	Women's doubles	2009 WIM	2009 USO	2010 AO	2010 FO	
11	Venus Williams	Women's doubles	2009 WIM	2009 USO	2010 AO	2010 FO	
13	Bob Bryan	Men's doubles	2012 USO	2013 AO	2013 FO	2013 WIM	
13	Mike Bryan	Men's doubles	2012 USO	2013 AO	2013 FO	2013 WIM	
15	Serena Williams (3)	Women's singles	2014 USO	2015 AO	2015 FO	2015 WIM	
16	Novak Djokovic	Men's singles	2015 WIM	2015 USO	2016 AO	2016 FO	
17	Jana Kovačková	Girls' doubles	2025 USO	2026 AO	2026 FO	2026 WIM	

=== Career Grand Slam ===
The career achievement of winning all four major championships in one discipline is termed a "Career Grand Slam", or "Career Slam". In singles, nine men (Fred Perry, Don Budge, Roy Emerson, Rod Laver, Andre Agassi, Roger Federer, Rafael Nadal, Novak Djokovic, and Carlos Alcaraz) and ten women (Maureen Connolly, Doris Hart, Shirley Fry Irvin, Margaret Court, Billie Jean King, Chris Evert, Martina Navratilova, Steffi Graf, Serena Williams, and Maria Sharapova) have completed a Career Grand Slam. Four men (Emerson, Laver, Djokovic, and Nadal) and five women (Court, Evert, Navratilova, Graf, and Williams) have achieved the feat more than once over the course of their careers.

Only six players have completed a Career Grand Slam in both singles and doubles: one man (Roy Emerson) and five women (Margaret Court, Doris Hart, Shirley Fry Irvin, Martina Navratilova, and Serena Williams).

Number of players to complete the Career Grand Slam
Singles		Doubles			Wheelchair singles			Wheelchair doubles			Junior singles		Junior doubles	
Men	Women	Men	Women	Mixed	Men	Women	Quad	Men	Women	Quad	Boys	Girls	Boys	Girls
9	10	25	24	17	3	2	2	8	8	6	1	0	1	1

=== Boxed Set ===
A "Boxed Set" refers to winning one of every possible major title in the singles, doubles, and mixed doubles disciplines throughout a player's career. Only three players have completed a Boxed Set, all women: Doris Hart, Margaret Court, and Martina Navratilova. Court's second Boxed Set, completed in 1969, spans the Amateur and Open Eras, but she later completed a set entirely within the Open Era in 1973.

- The event at which the Boxed Set was completed indicated in **bold**.

S Singles D Doubles X Mixed doubles

Boxed Sets	Player	Age	Australian Open			French Open			Wimbledon			US Open		
Boxed Sets	Player	Age	S	D	X	S	D	X	S	D	X	S	D	X
2	(Australia) Margaret Court	21	1960	1961	1963	1962	1964	1963	1963	**1964**	1963	1962	1963	1961
2	(Australia) Margaret Court	26	1961	1962	1964	1964	1965	1964	1965	**1969**	1965	1965	1968	1962
1	(United States) Doris Hart	29	1949	1950	1949	1950	1948	1951	1951	1947	1951	**1954**	1951	1951
1	(United States) Martina Navratilova	46	1981	1980	**2003**	1982	1975	1974	1978	1976	1985	1983	1977	1985

=== Golden Slam ===
The term "Golden Slam" (also known as "Golden Grand Slam", "Calendar-year Golden Slam" or "Calendar Golden Slam") refers to the achievement of winning all four majors and the Olympic or Paralympic gold medal in a calendar year. The achievement was first established in 1988, when Steffi Graf won all the aforementioned titles in singles. She is currently the only singles able-bodied player to achieve it, while Diede de Groot and Dylan Alcott also accomplished the feat, in wheelchair singles and wheelchair quad singles respectively.

- Non-calendar-year Golden Slam: refers to the achievement of winning all four majors and the Olympic or Paralympic gold medal consecutively across two calendar years. It has been used since 2013, when Bob and Mike Bryan won the aforementioned titles consecutively in doubles between 2012 and 2013. Their achievement was also dubbed the "Golden Bryan Slam".
- Career Golden Slam: refers to the achievement of winning all four majors and the Olympic or Paralympic gold medal during their career. In singles three men (Andre Agassi, Rafael Nadal and Novak Djokovic) and two women (Steffi Graf and Serena Williams) have completed the Career Golden Slam. Williams is currently the only able-bodied player to have achieved a Career Golden Slam in both singles and doubles.

Number of players to complete the Career Golden Slam
Singles		Doubles			Wheelchair singles			Wheelchair doubles			Junior singles		Junior doubles	
Men	Women	Men	Women	Mixed	Men	Women	Quad	Men	Women	Quad	Boys	Girls	Boys	Girls
3	2	6	7	0	2	2	2	6	7	4	0	0	0	0

=== Other concepts ===
- Super Slam: Combination of the Golden Slam and year-end championship title (ATP Finals for the men's tour, WTA Finals for the women's tour, and the Wheelchair Tennis Masters for the wheelchair tennis tour) in a calendar year, also known as "Calendar-year Super Slam" Diede de Groot is currently the only player to do so, in women's wheelchair singles in 2021.
- Non-calendar-year Super Slam: refers to the achievement of winning all four majors, the Olympic or Paralympic gold medal, and the year-end championship consecutively across two calendar years. Steffi Graf is currently the only one to achieve it, with her Golden Slam in 1988 following her victory at the year-end championship in 1987.
- Career Super Slam: refers to the achievement of winning all four majors, the Olympic or Paralympic gold medal, and the year-end championship throughout a career. In singles two men (Andre Agassi and Novak Djokovic) and two women (Steffi Graf and Serena Williams) have completed the Career Super Slam.

Number of players to complete the Career Super Slam
Singles		Doubles		Wheelchair singles			Wheelchair doubles		
Men	Women	Men	Women	Men	Women	Quad	Men	Women	Quad
2	2	5	4	2	2	2	6	7	3

- Three-Quarter Slam: refers to the achievement of winning three of the four majors in a calendar year, missing out on the Grand Slam by only one title.

Number of players to complete the Three-Quarter Slam
Singles		Doubles			Wheelchair singles			Wheelchair doubles			Junior singles		Junior doubles		WC jr. singles		WC jr. doubles	
Men	Women	Men	Women	Mixed	Men	Women	Quad	Men	Women	Quad	Boys	Girls	Boys	Girls	Boys	Girls	Boys	Girls
11	8	15	22	12	3	3	1	4	6	3	3	2	9	12	0	0	0	1

- Surface Slam: refers to the achievement of winning a major title on each of three different surfaces (currently clay, grass and hard courts) in a calendar year. It's been possible since 1978, when the US Open changed its playing surface from clay to hard courts. From 1978 to 1987, the Australian Open and Wimbledon were played on grass, the French Open on clay and the US Open on hard, but since 1988 the Australian Open has also been played on hard courts.

Number of players to complete the Surface Slam
Singles		Doubles			Wheelchair singles			Wheelchair doubles			Junior singles		Junior doubles	
Men	Women	Men	Women	Mixed	Men	Women	Quad	Men	Women	Quad	Boys	Girls	Boys	Girls
2	3	5	7	3	3	1	1	4	9	4	3	1	5	9

- Career Surface Slam: refers to the achievement of winning a major title on each of three surfaces (currently clay, grass and hard courts) throughout a career. Only a handful of players were able to achieve it multiple times, with Steffi Graf being the singles player that achieved it the most, winning on each surface at least 6 times.

Number of players to complete the Career Surface Slam
Singles		Doubles			Wheelchair singles			Wheelchair doubles			Junior singles		Junior doubles	
Men	Women	Men	Women	Mixed	Men	Women	Quad	Men	Women	Quad	Boys	Girls	Boys	Girls
7	8	17	26	21	4	3	2	9	10	6	3	1	6	13

- Channel Slam: refers to the achievement of winning both the French Open and Wimbledon in a calendar year. The name makes reference to the English Channel, the body of water separating France from the United Kingdom, the host countries of the French Open and Wimbledon. These tournaments are held clay and grass courts, respectively, surfaces very different from each other, usually being held a few weeks from each other, meaning that players who have deep runs in the French Open have little time to adapt to the different surface conditions found at Wimbledon.

Number of players to complete the Channel Slam
Singles		Doubles			Wheelchair singles			Wheelchair doubles			Junior singles		Junior doubles	
Men	Women	Men	Women	Mixed	Men	Women	Quad	Men	Women	Quad	Boys	Girls	Boys	Girls
13	10	29	34	18	3	1	2	5	9	6	10	7	15	21

=== Pro Slam ===
Before the start of the Open Era in 1968, only amateur players were allowed to compete in the four Grand Slam tournaments. Many male top players "went pro" in order to win prize money legally, competing on a professional world tour comprising completely separate events. From 1927 to 1967, the three tournaments considered by many to have been the "majors" of the professional tour were:

- U.S. Pro Tennis Championships,
- French Pro Championship,
- Wembley Championships.

A player who won all three in a calendar year was considered retrospectively to have achieved a "Professional Grand Slam", or "Pro Slam". In the pre-open era the terms did not exist. The feat was accomplished by Ken Rosewall in 1963 and Rod Laver in 1967, while Ellsworth Vines, Hans Nüsslein and Don Budge have won the three major trophies during their careers. The professional majors did not have a women's draw except for the Cleveland tournament in 1953, 1955, 1956, 1959.

== See also ==
- List of Grand Slam and related tennis records
- Lists of tennis records and statistics
- Grand Slam (golf)

== Bibliography ==
- Barrett, John (2014). Wimbledon: The Official History (4th ed.). Vision Sports Publishing. ISBN 9-781909-534230.
- Boehme, Gerry (2017). Serena Williams: Setting New Standards. Cavendish Square. ISBN 978-1502627629.
- Bowers, Chris (2013). Forder-White, Emily (ed.). The International Tennis Federation : a century of contribution to tennis. New York: Rizzoli. ISBN 978-0847839902.
- Collins, Bud (2010). The Bud Collins History of Tennis (2nd ed.). New York: New Chapter Press. ISBN 978-0942257700.
- Fein, Paul (2003). Tennis Confidential: Today's Greatest Players, Matches, and Controversies. Potomac Books. ISBN 9781574885262.
- Geist, Robert (1999). Der Grösste Meister. Die denkwürdige Karriere des australischen Tennisspielers Kenneth Robert Rosewall.
- Gillmeister, Heiner (1998). Tennis : A Cultural History. London: Leicester University Press. ISBN 978-0718501952.
- Martin, Lorena (2016). Sports Performance Measurement and Analytics: The Science of Assessing Performance, Predicting Future Outcomes, Interpreting Statistical Models, and Evaluating the Market Value of Athletes. FT Press. Pearson Education. ISBN 978-0-13-419330-4.
- McCauley, Joe (2003). The History of Professional Tennis. London: The Short Run Book Company Limited.
- Nelson, Murry R., ed. (2013). American Sports: A History of Icons, Idols, and Ideas. Greenwood Press. ISBN 9780313397523.
- Robertson, Max (1974). The Encyclopedia of Tennis: 100 Years of Great Players and Events. Viking Press. ISBN 978-0670294084.
- Shannon, Bill, ed. (1981). Official Encyclopedia of Tennis (3rd, revised and updated ed.). New York [u.a.]: Harper & Row. ISBN 9780060148966.
- Tingay, Lance (1977). 100 years of Wimbledon. Enfield [Eng.]: Guinness Superlatives. ISBN 0900424710.
