= 2023 Wimbledon Championships – Girls' 14&U singles =

Girls' 14&U singles
- 2023 Wimbledon Championships

Final
- Champion: (Serbia) Luna Vujović
- Runner-up: (United Kingdom) Hollie Smart
- Score: 6–3, 6–1

Events
| Singles | men | women | | boys | girls |
| Doubles | men | women | mixed | boys | girls |
| WC Singles | men | women | quad |
| WC Doubles | men | women | quad |
| 14&U Singles | boys | girls |
| Legends | men | women | mixed |
- Wimbledon Championships

It was the second edition of this discipline. Romania's Alexia Ioana Tatu was the defending champion and was still eligible to participate in the tournament but chose not to play. She did not return to play in the girls' singles event either. Serbia's Luna Vujović won the title by defeating Hollie Smart from Great Britain in straight sets.

== Format ==
The first phase of the tournament saw four round-robin groups compete. The winners of each group advanced to the semi-finals. The rest competed in a consolation play-off tournament.

== Draw ==
=== Final ===
Semifinals
A4 | (Serbia) Luna Vujović | 7^{7} | 7
C4 | (Romania) Maia Ilinca Burcescu | 6^{3} | 5
D1 | (United Kingdom) Hollie Smart | 6 | 6
B4 | (Serbia) Dusica Popovski | 2 | 4

Final
A4 | (Serbia) Luna Vujović | 6 | 6
D1 | (United Kingdom) Hollie Smart | 3 | 1

=== Group A ===
| | | (United States) Penickova | (Australia) Sibai | (South Korea) Sim | (Serbia) Vujović | RR; W–L | Set; W–L | Game; W–L | Standings |
| A1 | (United States) Kristina Penickova | | 6–0, 6–2 | 6–4, 6–7^{(4–7)}, [10–7] | 6–1, 5–7, [2–10] | 2–1 | 5–3 | 36–22 | 2 |
| A2 | (Australia) Jizelle Sibai | 0–6, 2–6 | | 6–3, 6–1 | 6–7^{(5–7)}, 1–6 | 1–2 | 2–4 | 21–29 | 3 |
| A3 | (South Korea) Sim Si-yeon | 4–6, 7–6^{(7–4)}, [7–10] | 3–6, 1–6 | | 1–6, 7–5, [13–11] | 1–2 | 3–5 | 24–36 | 4 |
| A4 | (Serbia) Luna Vujović [5] | 1–6, 7–5, [10–2] | 7–6^{(7–5)}, 6–1 | 6–1, 5–7, [11–13] | | 2–1 | 5–3 | 33–27 | 1 |

=== Group B ===
| | | (United States) Penickova | (United Kingdom) Griffiths | (Australia) Alame | (Serbia) Popovski | RR; W–L | Set; W–L | Game; W–L | Standings |
| B1 | (United States) Annika Penickova | | 6–3 6–0 | 6–4, 6–2 | 4–6, 6–0, [6–10] | 2–1 | 5–2 | 34–16 | 2 |
| B2 | (United Kingdom) Edie Griffiths | 3–6, 0–6 | | 7–6^{(7–3)}, 4–6, [8–10] | 1–6, 4–6 | 0–3 | 1–6 | 19–37 | 4 |
| B3 | (Australia) Renee Alame | 4–6, 2–6 | 6–7^{(3–7)}, 6–4, [10–8] | | 7–6^{(8–6)}, 6–7^{(4–7)}, [8–10] | 1–2 | 3–5 | 32–37 | 3 |
| B4 | (Serbia) Dusica Popovski | 6–4, 0–6, [10–6] | 6–1, 6–4 | 6–7^{(6–8)}, 7–6^{(7–4)}, [10–8] | | 3–0 | 6–2 | 33–28 | 1 |

=== Group C ===
| | | (Czech Republic) Sekerková | (South Korea) Hong | (Argentina) Carrocera | (Romania) Burcescu | RR; W–L | Set; W–L | Game; W–L | Standings |
| C1 | (Czech Republic) Veronika Sekerková | | 1–6, 6–3, [4–10] | 6–2, 6–1 | 2–6, 7–6^{(7–2)}, [11–13] | 1–2 | 4–4 | 28–26 | 3 |
| C2 | (South Korea) Hong Ye-ri | 6–1, 3–6, [10–4] | | 6–3, 6–1 | 3–6, 2–6 | 2–1 | 4–3 | 27–23 | 2 |
| C3 | (Argentina) Mora Carrocera | 2–6, 1–6 | 3–6, 1–6 | | 0–6, 1–6 | 0–3 | 0–6 | 8–36 | 4 |
| C4 | (Romania) Maia Ilinca Burcescu | 6–2, 6–7^{(2–7)}, [13–11] | 6–3, 6–2 | 6–0, 6–1 | | 3–0 | 6–1 | 37–15 | 1 |

=== Group D ===
| | | (United Kingdom) Smart | (Venezuela) Balderrama | (Poland) Sybicka | (Czech Republic) Kovačková | RR; W–L | Set; W–L | Game; W–L | Standings |
| D1 | (United Kingdom) Hollie Smart | | 6–3, 6–2 | 3–6, 6–3, [13–11] | 6–2, 6–4 | 3–0 | 6–1 | 34–20 | 1 |
| D2 | (Venezuela) Sabrina Balderrama | 3–6, 2–6 | | 6–0, 7–6^{(7–3)} | 1–6, 2–6 | 1–2 | 2–4 | 21–30 | 3 |
| D3 | (Poland) Oliwia Sybicka | 6–3, 3–6, [11–13] | 0–6, 6–7^{(3–7)} | | 5–7, 2–6 | 0–3 | 1–6 | 22–36 | 4 |
| D4 | (Czech Republic) Jana Kovačková | 2–6, 4–6 | 6–1, 6–2 | 7–5, 6–2 | | 2–1 | 4–2 | 31–22 | 2 |

Standings are determined by: 1. number of wins; 2. number of matches played; 3. in two-players-ties, head-to-head records; 4. in three-players-ties, percentage of sets won, then percentage of games won.

=== Consolation Playoffs ===
First round
A1 | (United States) Kristina Penickova | 4 | 3
D4 | (Czech Republic) Jana Kovačková | 6 | 6
C2 | (South Korea) Hong Ye-ri | 4 | 6^{8}
B1 | (United States) Annika Penickova | 6 | 7^{10}

Second round
D4 | (Czech Republic) Jana Kovačková | 1 | 7 | [14]
B1 | (United States) Annika Penickova | 6 | 5 | [12]

First round
B3 | (Australia) Renee Alame | 6 | 6
A3 | (South Korea) Sim Si-yeon | 1 | 4
C1 | (Czech Republic) Veronika Sekerková
D2 | (Venezuela) Sabrina Balderrama | w/o

Second round
B3 | (Australia) Renee Alame | w/o
D2 | (Venezuela) Sabrina Balderrama

First round
D3 | (Poland) Oliwia Sybicka | 6 | 3 | [7]
A2 | (Australia) Jizelle Sibai | 1 | 6 | [10]
C3 | (Argentina) Mora Carrocera | 3 | 1
B2 | (United Kingdom) Edie Griffiths | 6 | 6

Second round
A2 | (Australia) Jizelle Sibai | 6 | 3 | [6]
B2 | (United Kingdom) Edie Griffiths | 4 | 6 | [10]
