= Valentín González-Galiño =

Spanish tennis player (born 2008)

- Country (sports): Spain
- Born: 11 December 2008 (age 17)
- Prize money: US $5,552

Singles
- Career record: 0–0
- Career titles: 0
- Highest ranking: No. 1,492 (26 October 2026)
- Current ranking: No. 1,499 (2 November 2026)

Doubles
- Career record: 0–0
- Career titles: 0
- Highest ranking: No. 978 (2 November 2026)
- Current ranking: No. 978 (2 November 2026)

Grand Slam doubles results
- US Open Junior: W (2026)
- Last updated on: 2 November 2026.

Valentín González-Galiño (born 11 December 2008) is a Spanish tennis player. He has a career-high ATP singles ranking of No. 1,492 achieved on 26 October 2026 and a doubles ranking of No. 978 achieved on 2 November 2026.

González-Galiño reached an ITF Junior combined ranking of No. 32 on 13 April 2026.

He has won the boys' doubles title at the 2026 US Open, with Aaron Gabet.

== Career ==
From Barcelona, González-Galiño is the son of former tennis player Alicia Ortuño and has a sister, Alexia, who is also a junior player. He focused on tennis as a teenager having also played other sports, such as football.

In September 2026, González-Galiño earned the boys' doubles title at the 2026 US Open, partnering with France's Gabet. The pair defeated local players Tanishk Konduri and Marcel Latak in a match tiebreak in the final. In the boys' singles event, he was defeated in the second round by eight seed and junior Wimbledon champion Jordan Lee.

== ITF World Tennis Tour finals ==
=== Doubles: 2 (1 title, 1 runner-up) ===
Legend ITF World Tennis (1–1)

Result	W–L	Date	Tournament	Surface	Partner	Opponents	Score
Win	1–0	Jun 2026	M15 Constanța, Romania	Clay	(Argentina) Julio César Porras	(Romania) Mihai David Haita (Romania) Radu David Țurcanu	7–6^{(7–4)}, 6–1
Loss	1–1	Jul 2026	M15 Rognac, France	Hard	(Argentina) Julio César Porras	(France) Mikail Alimli (France) Antoine Walch	6–4, 3–6, [4–10]

== Junior Grand Slam finals ==
=== Doubles: 1 (title) ===
Result	Year	Tournament	Surface	Partner	Opponents	Score
Win	2026	US Open	Hard	(France) Aaron Gabet	(United States) Tanishk Konduri (United States) Marcel Latak	7–6^{(7–5)}, 2–6, [11–9]
