= Marcel Latak =

American tennis player (born 2009)

- Country (sports): United States
- Born: January 22, 2009 (age 17) Chicago, Illinois, US
- Prize money: US $1,369

Singles
- Career record: 0–0 (at ATP Tour level, Grand Slam level, and in Davis Cup)
- Career titles: 0
- Highest ranking: No. 1,604 (August 22, 2026)
- Current ranking: No. 1,631 (September 21, 2026)

Grand Slam singles results
- US Open Junior: W (2026)

Doubles
- Career record: 0–0 (at ATP Tour level, Grand Slam level, and in Davis Cup)
- Career titles: 0

Grand Slam doubles results
- US Open Junior: F (2026)
- Last updated on: September 26, 2026.

Marcel Latak (born 22 January 2009) is an American tennis player. He has a career-high ATP singles ranking of No. 1,604 achieved on August 22, 2026.

Latak reached an ITF Junior combined ranking of No. 7 on September 21, 2026.

Latak has won the boys' singles title at the 2026 US Open.

== Early and personal life ==
Latak was born in Chicago, Illinois, the son of Rafał and Klaudia, who both hail from Poland. His sister, Thea, is also a junior tennis player. He trained from 2025 in San Diego with tennis coach Christian Groh, who previously worked with Taylor Fritz and Brandon Nakashima. He agreed to join Stanford University in 2027.

== Career ==
Latak was the 2025 USTA National Championship Boys' U16 winner, winning in three sets against Andrew Johnson.

Latak won the J300 Tournament in San Diego in March 2026, beating higher-ranked compatriot Andy Johnson in the final. He also won the J300 Canada in 2026. In the boys' singles at the 2026 US Open in September 2026, he reached the final, recording wins over top-10 seeded players Dimitar Kisimov, Keaton Hance and Ziga Sesko, before facing Jamie Mackenzie of Germany, the number two seed and winning in straight sets. In the final he defeated number one seed Guto Miguel of Brazil in three sets, saving three match points. Latak became first American to win the title since Taylor Fritz in 2015. He also reached the final of the boys' doubles at the championships, playing alongside compatriot Tanishk Konduri, with the pair defeating fellow American Safir Azam and Damir Zhalgasbay of Kazakhstan in the semifinals. In doing so, he became the first player to reach both boys' finals at Flushing Meadow since Wu Yibing in 2017.

== Junior Grand Slam finals ==
=== Singles: 1 (title) ===
Result	Year	Tournament	Surface	Opponent	Score
Win	2026	US Open	Hard	(Brazil) Guto Miguel	3–6, 7–5, 7–6^{(15–13)}

=== Doubles: 1 (runner-up) ===
Result	Year	Tournament	Surface	Partner	Opponents	Score
Loss	2026	US Open	Hard	(United States) Tanishk Konduri	(France) Aaron Gabet (Spain) Valentín González-Galiño	6–7^{(5–7)}, 6–2, [9–11]
