= Aaron Gabet =

French tennis player (born 2008)

- Country (sports): France
- Born: 22 January 2008 (age 18)
- Prize money: US $1,719

Singles
- Career record: 0–0
- Career titles: 0

Doubles
- Career record: 0–0
- Career titles: 0; 1 ITF
- Highest ranking: No. 1,499 (29 June 2026)
- Current ranking: No. 1,538 (21 September 2026)

Grand Slam doubles results
- US Open Junior: W (2026)
- Last updated on: 26 September 2026.

Aaron Gabet (born 22 January 2008) is a French tennis player. He has a career-high ATP doubles ranking of No. 1,499 achieved on 29 June 2026.

Gabet reached an ITF Junior combined ranking of No. 55 on 2 March 2026.

He has won the boys' doubles title at the 2026 US Open, with Valentín González-Galiño.

== Career ==
A member of Smash Club Entraigues (Union Sportive Smash Club Entraigues) in Entraigues-sur-la-Sorgue in the Vaucluse department, Gabet earned his first pro tennis title in June 2026 – at the Bourg-en-Bresse Grand Prix, a Futures-level event – playing alongside fellow-countryman Mickael Kaouk. The French pair defeated Théo Papamalamis and Luxembourg's Yannick Baluska in straight sets.

In September 2026, Gabet earned the boys' doubles title at the 2026 US Open, partnering with Spain's González-Galiño. The pair defeated local players Tanishk Konduri and Marcel Latak in a match tiebreak in the final.

== ITF World Tennis Tour finals ==
=== Doubles: 1 (title) ===
Legend ITF World Tennis (1–0)

Result	W–L	Date	Tournament	Surface	Partner	Opponents	Score
Win	1–0	Jun 2026	M15 Bourg-en-Bresse, France	Clay	(France) Mickael Kaouk	(Luxembourg) Yannick Baluska (France) Théo Papamalamis	6–1, 6–3

== Junior Grand Slam finals ==
=== Doubles: 1 (title) ===
Result	Year	Tournament	Surface	Partner	Opponents	Score
Win	2026	US Open	Hard	(Spain) Valentin González-Galiño	(United States) Tanishk Konduri (United States) Marcel Latak	7–6^{(7–5)}, 2–6, [11–9]
