= 2025 Copa Colsanitas – Doubles =

Tennis tournament

Doubles
- 2025 Copa Colsanitas

Final
- Champions: (Spain) Cristina Bucșa (Spain) Sara Sorribes Tormo
- Runners-up: (Romania) Irina Bara (Brazil) Laura Pigossi
- Score: 5–7, 6–2, [10–5]

Details
- Draw: 16
- Seeds: 4

Events
Singles	Doubles
← 2024 ·	Copa Colsanitas	· 2026 →

Defending champion Cristina Bucșa and her partner, Sara Sorribes Tormo, defeated Irina Bara and Laura Pigossi in the final, 5–7, 6–2, [10–5] to win the doubles tennis title at the 2025 Copa Colsanitas.

Bucșa and Kamilla Rakhimova were the reigning champions, but Rakhimova did not participate this year.

== Seeds ==
1. (Spain) Cristina Bucșa / (Spain) Sara Sorribes Tormo (champions)
2. (United Kingdom) Emily Appleton / (United States) Quinn Gleason (semifinals)
3. (Czech Republic) Marie Bouzková / (Poland) Katarzyna Kawa (withdrew)
4. (Canada) Ariana Arseneault / (Georgia (country)) Oksana Kalashnikova (quarterfinals)

== Draw ==
=== Key ===
- Q = Qualifier
- WC = Wild card
- LL = Lucky loser
- Alt = Alternate
- ITF = ITF entry
- PR = Protected ranking
- SR = Special ranking
- SE = Special exempt
- JE = Junior exempt
- JR = Junior Accelerator Programme entrant
- CO = College Accelerator Programme entrant
- NG = Next Gen Accelerator Program entrant
- w/o = Walkover
- r = Retired
- d = Defaulted

=== Draw ===
First round
1	(Spain) C Bucșa (Spain) S Sorribes Tormo	6	6
(Italy) N Fossa Huergo (Ukraine) V Strakhova	3	3
WC	(Colombia) V Mediorreal (Colombia) MP Pérez	7^{7}	6
(Colombia) E Arango (France) S Janicijevic	6^{4}	3
Alt	(United States) E Bektas (Serbia) A Krunić	7	6
(France) L Jeanjean (United States) V Lepchenko	5	0
WC	(Colombia) MI Higuita (Colombia) MJ Sánchez Uribe	1	3
(Brazil) I Martins (Argentina) J Riera	6	6
(Romania) I Bara (Brazil) L Pigossi	7	6
M Kononova (United States) C Rosca	5	4
(United Kingdom) T Moore (Thailand) P Plipuech	6	3	[4]
4	(Canada) A Arseneault (Georgia (country)) O Kalashnikova	1	6	[10]
(United States) J Aney (United States) J Failla	6^{6}	6	[10]
M Kozyreva; A Tikhonova	7^{8}	2	[6]
(United States) C Corley (Netherlands) E Vedder	6^{5}	6	[7]
2	(United Kingdom) E Appleton (United States) Q Gleason	7^{7}	3	[10]

Quarterfinals
1	(Spain) C Bucșa (Spain) S Sorribes Tormo	4	6	[10]
WC	(Colombia) V Mediorreal (Colombia) MP Pérez	6	0	[8]
Alt	(United States) E Bektas (Serbia) A Krunić	6	6
(Brazil) I Martins (Argentina) J Riera	2	2
(Romania) I Bara (Brazil) L Pigossi	5	6	[10]
4	(Canada) A Arseneault (Georgia (country)) O Kalashnikova	7	2	[6]
(United States) J Aney (United States) J Failla	3	2
2	(United Kingdom) E Appleton (United States) Q Gleason	6	6

Semifinals
1	(Spain) C Bucșa (Spain) S Sorribes Tormo	7^{7}	6
Alt	(United States) E Bektas (Serbia) A Krunić	6^{0}	1
(Romania) I Bara (Brazil) L Pigossi	6	6
2	(United Kingdom) E Appleton (United States) Q Gleason	4	2

Final
1	(Spain) C Bucșa (Spain) S Sorribes Tormo	5	6	[10]
(Romania) I Bara (Brazil) L Pigossi	7	2	[5]
