= 2024 Copa Colsanitas – Singles =

Singles
- 2024 Copa Colsanitas

Final
- Champion: (Colombia) Camila Osorio
- Runner-up: (Czech Republic) Marie Bouzková
- Score: 6–3, 7–6^{(7–5)}

Details
- Draw: 32
- Seeds: 8

Events
Singles	Doubles
- Copa Colsanitas

Camila Osorio defeated Marie Bouzková in the final, 6–3, 7–6^{(7–5)} to win the singles tennis title at the 2024 Copa Colsanitas. It was her second title at her home event, after her victory in 2021.

Tatjana Maria was the two-time defending champion, but she lost to Osorio in the quarterfinals.

== Seeds ==
1. (Czech Republic) Marie Bouzková (final)
2. (Germany) Tatjana Maria (quarterfinals)
3. (Spain) Sara Sorribes Tormo (second round)
4. (Spain) Cristina Bucșa (quarterfinals)
5. (Argentina) Nadia Podoroska (first round)
6. (Colombia) Camila Osorio (champion)
7. (Germany) Laura Siegemund (quarterfinals)
8. Kamilla Rakhimova (semifinals)

== Draw ==
Key

- Q = Qualifier
- WC = Wild card
- LL = Lucky loser
- Alt = Alternate
- ITF = ITF entry
- PR = Protected ranking
- SR = Special ranking
- SE = Special exempt
- JE = Junior exempt
- JR = Junior Accelerator Programme entrant
- CO = College Accelerator Programme entrant
- NG = Next Gen Accelerator Program entrant
- w/o = Walkover
- r = Retired
- d = Defaulted

=== Finals ===
Semifinals
1	(Czech Republic) Marie Bouzková	6	7^{7}
8	Kamilla Rakhimova	4	6^{2}
(Italy) Sara Errani	6^{4}	4
6	(Colombia) Camila Osorio	7^{7}	6

Final
1	(Czech Republic) Marie Bouzková	3	6^{5}
6	(Colombia) Camila Osorio	6	7^{7}

=== Top half ===
First round
1	(Czech Republic) M Bouzková	6	6
(Canada) R Marino	0	3
(Slovenia) T Zidanšek	2	6	3
(United States) H Baptiste	6	4	6
WC	(Colombia) Y Monroy	1	2
(United Kingdom) F Jones	6	6
Q	I Shymanovich	6^{5}	5
7	(Germany) L Siegemund	7^{7}	7
4	(Spain) C Bucșa	6	7
Q	(China) X You	1	5
(Germany) J Niemeier	6	6
Q	(Italy) N Brancaccio	2	3
(Mexico) R Zarazúa	6	6
WC	(Colombia) M Higuita	0	0
WC	(Colombia) V Mediorreal	4	7^{8}	1
8	K Rakhimova	6	6^{6}	6

Second round
1	(Czech Republic) M Bouzková	6	6
(United States) H Baptiste	3	4
(United Kingdom) F Jones	7^{7}	4	2
7	(Germany) L Siegemund	6^{4}	6	6
4	(Spain) C Bucșa	6	6
(Germany) J Niemeier	4	1
(Mexico) R Zarazúa	6^{4}	7^{7}	3
8	K Rakhimova	7^{7}	6^{5}	6

Quarterfinals
1	(Czech Republic) M Bouzková	2	6	7
7	(Germany) L Siegemund	6	2	5
4	(Spain) C Bucșa	6	4	5
8	K Rakhimova	0	6	7

Semifinals
1	(Czech Republic) M Bouzková	6	7^{7}
8	K Rakhimova	4	6^{2}

=== Bottom half ===
First round
5	(Argentina) N Podoroska	4	1
(Brazil) L Pigossi	6	6
Q	(Ukraine) K Zavatska	6	3	4
(Romania) I Bara	2	6	6
(Ukraine) Y Starodubtseva	2	3
(Italy) S Errani	6	6
M Timofeeva	1	3
3	(Spain) S Sorribes Tormo	6	6
6	(Colombia) C Osorio	6	6
Q	(Canada) M Stakusic	4	2
(Italy) L Stefanini	6	2	4
Q	(Romania) A Todoni	4	6	6
(Colombia) E Arango	0	3
(Argentina) J Riera	6	6
(Hungary) A Bondár	3	2
2	(Germany) T Maria	6	6

Second round
(Brazil) L Pigossi	6	6^{3}	4
(Romania) I Bara	3	7^{7}	6
(Italy) S Errani	6	4	6
3	(Spain) S Sorribes Tormo	2	6	4
6	(Colombia) C Osorio	7^{7}	6
Q	(Romania) A Todoni	6^{4}	4
(Argentina) J Riera	6	0	2
2	(Germany) T Maria	2	6	6

Quarterfinals
(Romania) I Bara	6	2	3
(Italy) S Errani	4	6	6
6	(Colombia) C Osorio	1	6	6
2	(Germany) T Maria	6	3	3

Semifinals
(Italy) S Errani	6^{4}	4
6	(Colombia) C Osorio	7^{7}	6

== Qualifying ==
=== Seeds ===
1. (Netherlands) Suzan Lamens (qualifying competition)
2. (Serbia) Natalija Stevanović (qualifying competition)
3. (Ukraine) Katarina Zavatska (qualified)
4. Iryna Shymanovich (qualified)
5. (Slovenia) Dalila Jakupović (first round)
6. (Canada) Carol Zhao (first round)
7. (United States) Elvina Kalieva (qualifying competition)
8. (Canada) Marina Stakusic (qualified)
9. (France) Harmony Tan (qualifying competition)
10. (China) You Xiaodi (qualified)
11. (Romania) Anca Todoni (qualified)
12. (Italy) Nuria Brancaccio (qualified)

=== Qualifiers ===
1. (Italy) Nuria Brancaccio
2. (China) You Xiaodi
3. (Ukraine) Katarina Zavatska
4. Iryna Shymanovich
5. (Canada) Marina Stakusic
6. (Romania) Anca Todoni

=== Qualifying draw ===
==== First qualifier ====
First round
1	(Netherlands) Suzan Lamens	6	6
WC	(Colombia) María Torres Murcia	0	3
(United States) Whitney Osuigwe	2	1
12	(Italy) Nuria Brancaccio	6	6

Qualifying competition
1	(Netherlands) Suzan Lamens	2	1
12	(Italy) Nuria Brancaccio	6	6

==== Second qualifier ====
First round
2	(Serbia) Natalija Stevanović	6	6
(United States) Victoria Hu	0	1
WC	(Colombia) María Sánchez Uribe	1	1
10	(China) You Xiaodi	6	6

Qualifying competition
2	(Serbia) Natalija Stevanović	1	4
10	(China) You Xiaodi	6	6

==== Third qualifier ====
First round
3	(Ukraine) Katarina Zavatska	6	7
(Mexico) Victoria Rodríguez	1	5
Jana Kolodynska	6	6^{3}	4
7	(United States) Elvina Kalieva	1	7^{7}	6

Qualifying competition
3	(Ukraine) Katarina Zavatska	0	6	6
7	(United States) Elvina Kalieva	6	3	3

==== Fourth qualifier ====
First round
4	Iryna Shymanovich	3	6	6
WC	(Colombia) María Paulina Pérez	6	1	0
(Serbia) Katarina Kozarov	0	0
9	(France) Harmony Tan	6	6

Qualifying competition
4	Iryna Shymanovich	6	6
9	(France) Harmony Tan	4	3

==== Fifth qualifier ====
First round
5	(Slovenia) Dalila Jakupović	7	3	3
(Hungary) Fanny Stollár	5	6	6
WC	(Colombia) María Paz Ospina	2	2
8	(Canada) Marina Stakusic	6	6

Qualifying competition
(Hungary) Fanny Stollár	6^{0}	0^{r}
8	(Canada) Marina Stakusic	7^{7}	0

==== Sixth qualifier ====
First round
6	(Canada) Carol Zhao	3	6^{5}
(United States) Varvara Lepchenko	6	7^{7}
(Mexico) Ana Sofía Sánchez	4	4
11	(Romania) Anca Todoni	6	6

Qualifying competition
(United States) Varvara Lepchenko	6^{4}	4
11	(Romania) Anca Todoni	7^{7}	6
