= 2026 ITF Women's World Tennis Tour =

Entry and mid-level professional circuit

2026 Women's World Tennis Tour
Details
- Duration: 5 January 2026 – 27 December 2026
- Edition: 33rd
- Categories: W100 tournaments W75 tournaments W50 tournaments W35 tournaments W15 tournaments

Achievements (singles)
- Most titles: (United Kingdom) Alicia Dudeney (Czech Republic) Alisa Oktiabreva (6)
- Most finals: (Mexico) Ana Sofía Sánchez (7)

The 2026 Women's World Tennis Tour, formerly the 2026 International Tennis Federation (ITF) Women's World Tennis Tour, is the entry-level and mid-level tour for women's professional tennis. It is organized by World Tennis (formerly known as the International Tennis Federation) and is a tier below the WTA Challenger series of the Women's Tennis Association (WTA) Tour. The Tour provides a professional pathway between the Junior World Tennis Tour and the WTA Tour. The results of World Tennis (previously ITF) tournaments are incorporated into the WTA ranking, which enables professionals to progress through to the elite levels of women's professional tennis. The Women's World Tennis Tour offers approximately 500 tournaments across 65 countries and incorporates five prize money levels of tournaments: $15,000, $30,000, $40,000, $60,000 and $100,000.

Tournaments at $15,000 level include reserved main draw places for Top-100 ranked World Tennis Juniors, providing a smooth pathway for the best new talent to break through into elite professional tennis. The Women's World Tennis Tour is also designed to target prize money effectively to help reduce costs for players and ultimately enable more players to make a living. From 2025, the prize money has increased in one category. At W35 tournaments from $25,000 to $30,000.

From 1 March 2022, following the Russian invasion of Ukraine the ITF announced that players from Belarus and Russia could still play on the tour but would not be allowed to play under the flag of Belarus or Russia. On 25 June 2026, the ITF rebranded as World Tennis. Due to logistical challenges, events on the newly renamed "Women's World Tennis Tour" may continue to use the former ITF branding until 1 January 2027.

== Participating host nations ==
- Argentina (ARG)
- Armenia (ARM)
- Australia (AUS)
- Austria (AUT)
- Bahrain (BHR)
- Belgium (BEL)
- Bosnia and Herzegovina (BIH)
- Botswana (BOT)
- Brazil (BRA)
- Bulgaria (BUL)
- Burundi (BDI)
- Canada (CAN)
- Chile (CHI)
- China (CHN)
- Chinese Taipei (TPE)
- Croatia (CRO)
- Czech Republic (CZE)
- Denmark (DEN)
- Dominican Republic (DOM)
- Egypt (EGY)
- Finland (FIN)
- France (FRA)
- Georgia (GEO)
- Germany (GER)
- Great Britain (GBR)
- Greece (GRE)
- Hungary (HUN)
- India (IND)
- Ireland (IRE)
- Italy (ITA)
- Japan (JPN)
- Kazakhstan (KAZ)
- Kenya (KEN)
- Luxembourg (LUX)
- Malta (MLT)
- Mexico (MEX)
- Moldova (MDA)
- Morocco (MAR)
- Netherlands (NED)
- New Zealand (NZL)
- Nigeria (NGR)
- Norway (NOR)
- Pakistan (PAK)
- Paraguay (PAR)
- Peru (PER)
- Poland (POL)
- Portugal (POR)
- Romania (ROU)
- Serbia (SRB)
- Singapore (SGP)
- Slovakia (SVK)
- Slovenia (SLO)
- South Africa (RSA)
- South Korea (KOR)
- Spain (SPA)
- Sweden (SWE)
- Switzerland (SUI)
- Thailand (THA)
- Tunisia (TUN)
- Turkey (TUR)
- United Arab Emirates (UAE)
- United States (USA)

== WTA ranking points distribution ==
Category	W	F	SF	QF	R16	R32	R64	Q	FQR	Q2	Q1
W100 (48S, 32Q)	100	65	39	21	12	7	1	5	3	–	–
W100 (32S, 32/24Q)	100	65	39	21	12	1	–	5	3	–	–
W100 (16D)	100	65	39	21	1	–	–	–	–	–	–
W75 (48S, 32Q)	75	49	29	16	9	5	1	3	2	–	–
W75 (32S, 32/24Q)	75	49	29	16	9	1	–	3	2	–	–
W75 (16D)	75	49	29	16	1	–	–	–	–	–	–
W50 (48S, 32Q)	50	33	20	11	6	3	1	2	1	–	–
W50 (32S, 32/24Q)	50	33	20	11	6	1	–	2	1	–	–
W50 (16D)	50	33	20	11	1	–	–	–	–	–	–
W35 (48S, 32Q)	35	30	18	9	5	3	1	1	–	–	–
W35 (32S, 32/24Q)	35	23	14	8	4	–	–	1	–	–	–
W35 (32S, 48/64Q)	35	23	14	8	4	–	–	1	–	–	–
W35 (16D)	35	23	14	8	1	–	–	–	–	–	–
W15 (32S, 32/24Q)	15	10	6	3	1	–	–	–	–	–	–
W15 (32S, 48/64Q)	15	10	6	3	1	–	–	–	–	–	–
W15 (16D)	15	10	6	1	–	–	–	–	–	–	–

== Statistics ==
=== Key ===
Category
W100 tournaments
W75 tournaments
W50 tournaments
W35 tournaments
W15 tournaments

These tables present the number of singles (S) and doubles (D) titles won by each player and each nation during the season. The players/nations are sorted by:

1. Total number of titles (a doubles title won by two players representing the same nation counts as only one win for the nation)
2. A singles > doubles hierarchy
3. Alphabetical order (by family names for players).

To avoid confusion and double counting, these tables should be updated only after all events of the week are completed.

=== Titles won by player ===
Updated as of 23 November

Total	Player	W100		W75		W50		W35		W15		Total	
Total	Player	S	D	S	D	S	D	S	D	S	D	S	D
11	Sapfo Sakellaridi (GRE)				2		3		6			0	11
10	Sarah van Emst (NED)				1		3	1	3		2	1	9
10	Elena Milovanović (SRB)				1		2	2	2	1	2	3	7
10	Astrid Cirotte (FRA)								1	3	6	3	7
9	Alicia Dudeney (GBR)					1	1	3	1	2	1	6	3
9	Daria Egorova					1	1	1	2	3	1	5	4
9	Joëlle Steur (GER)						1	2	6			2	7
9	Katarína Kužmová (SVK)						1	1	4	2	1	3	6
9	Back Da-yeon (KOR)							3	6			3	6
9	Alesia Breaz (ROU)								1	1	7	1	8
8	Savannah Broadus (USA)		2		1	1	1		3			1	7
8	Lamis Alhussein Abdel Aziz (EGY)								1	3	4	3	5
8	Yasmin Ezzat (EGY)								1	3	4	3	5
7	Angella Okutoyi (KEN)		1		1		1	1	3			1	6
7	Reese Brantmeier (USA)			2	2		1	1	1			3	4
7	Alexandra Shubladze			1		1	1	3	1			5	2
7	Jana Kovačková (CZE)				2	1	2		2			1	6
7	Alena Kovačková (CZE)				2		2		3			0	7
7	Amelia Rajecki (GBR)				1		2	1	2		1	1	6
7	Weronika Falkowska (POL)						1	2	2	2		4	3
7	Sofía Cabezas Domínguez (VEN)						1		2	1	3	1	6
7	Daria Yesypchuk (UKR)								2	3	2	3	4
7	Kim Eun-chae (KOR)								2		5	0	7
7	Kamonwan Yodpetch (THA)									1	6	1	6
6	Anna Sisková (CZE)		1	1	2	1				1		3	3
6	Freya Christie (GBR)		1		1		1		3			0	6
6	Zhibek Kulambayeva (KAZ)		1				2			1	2	1	5
6	Anastasia Tikhonova				3		3					0	6
6	Nina Vargová (SVK)				1				2	3		3	3
6	Alisa Oktiabreva (CZE)					1		5				6	0
6	Ksenia Zaytseva						1	1	1	2	1	3	3
6	Luciana Moyano (ARG)						1		2	1	2	1	5
6	Anja Stanković (SRB)						1			1	4	1	5
6	Elyse Tse (NZL)						1				5	0	6
6	Im Hee-rae (KOR)								2		4	0	6
6	Ana Candiotto (BRA)								1	1	4	1	5
6	Valentina Mediorreal (COL)								1		5	0	6
6	Felitsata Dorofeeva-Rybas									3	3	3	3
6	Yuliya Hatouka									3	3	3	3
6	Asylzhan Arystanbekova (KAZ)									2	4	2	4
5	Allura Zamarripa (USA)		4		1							0	5
5	Ayano Shimizu (JPN)		1		2		1		1			0	5
5	Aneta Kučmová (CZE)		1		2				2			0	5
5	Zhang Ying (CHN)		1		1		1		2			0	5
5	Martyna Kubka (POL)			1	2		1		1			1	4
5	Vendula Valdmannová (CZE)				1	3	1					3	2
5	Britt du Pree (NED)				1		1	2	1			2	3
5	Enola Chiesa (ITA)				1				2	1	1	1	4
5	Savannah Dada-Mascoll (GBR)				1				1		3	0	5
5	Shi Han (CHN)					2	1			2		4	1
5	Hiromi Abe (JPN)					1		1	1	2		4	1
5	Julia Adams (USA)						3				2	0	5
5	Valentina Steiner (GER)						1	1		2	1	3	2
5	Lucie Nguyen Tan (FRA)						1		2		2	0	5
5	Anita Sahdiieva (UKR)						1		1		3	0	5
5	Giorgia Pedone (ITA)							2	2		1	2	3
5	Annika Penickova (USA)							1	4			1	4
5	Naho Sato (JPN)							1	3	1		2	3
5	Lily Fairclough (AUS)								2		3	0	5
5	Marie Vogt (GER)								1	3	1	3	2
5	Cristiana Nicoleta Todoni (ROU)								1		4	0	5
5	Yuliya Perapekhina									4	1	4	1
5	Alina Tikhonova									4	1	4	1
5	Marie Mettraux (SUI)									2	3	2	3
5	Mi Lan (CHN)									2	3	2	3
5	Thasaporn Naklo (THA)									2	3	2	3
5	Antonia Vergara Rivera (CHI)									2	3	2	3
5	Kateryna Lazarenko (UKR)									1	4	1	4
4	Hanne Vandewinkel (BEL)	2		2								4	0
4	Katie Swan (GBR)	1		1				2				4	0
4	Ángela Fita Boluda (ESP)	1			1		1		1			1	3
4	Aneta Laboutková (CZE)		1		2				1			0	4
4	Varvara Panshina		1		2						1	0	4
4	Eden Silva (GBR)		1		1		1		1			0	4
4	Huang Yujia (CHN)		1						3			0	4
4	Cody Wong Hong-yi (HKG)		1						2		1	0	4
4	Veronika Podrez (UKR)			2			1	1				3	1
4	Matilde Jorge (POR)				3	1						1	3
4	Ayana Akli (USA)				2		1	1				1	3
4	Oana Gavrilă (ROU)				1		2		1			0	4
4	Ariana Arseneault (CAN)				1		1		2			0	4
4	Rositsa Dencheva (BUL)				1		1	2				2	2
4	Kylie Collins (USA)				1		1		1		1	0	4
4	Adrienn Nagy (HUN)				1				2	1		1	3
4	Kaat Coppez (BEL)				1						3	0	4
4	Ane Mintegi del Olmo (ESP)					2		2				4	0
4	Ella McDonald (GBR)					1	2		1			1	3
4	Kayla Day (USA)					1		2	1			3	1
4	Merel Hoedt (NED)						3				1	0	4
4	Valentini Grammatikopoulou (GRE)						1	2	1			2	2
4	Kisa Yoshioka (JPN)						1	1	1		1	1	3
4	Ayumi Miyamoto (JPN)						1		1	1	1	1	3
4	Andrė Lukošiūtė (LTU)						1			1	2	1	3
4	María Fernanda Navarro (MEX)						1				3	0	4
4	Hanna Chang (USA)							4				4	0
4	Evialina Laskevich							2	1	1		3	1
4	Hikaru Sato (JPN)							1	3			1	3
4	Monique Barry (NZL)								4			0	4
4	Elina Nepliy								3	1		1	3
4	Isis Louise van den Broek (NED)								3	1		1	3
4	Kristina Penickova (USA)								3		1	0	3
4	Ikumi Yamazaki (JPN)								2	1	1	1	3
4	Marie Mattel (FRA)								2		2	0	4
4	Rebeca Pereira (BRA)								2		2	0	4
4	Luiza Fullana (BRA)								1	2	1	2	2
4	Esther Adeshina (GBR)								1	1	2	1	3
4	Anne Christine Lutkemeyer (USA)								1	1	2	1	3
4	Josy Daems (GER)								1		3	0	4
4	Sabastiani León (MEX)								1		3	0	4
4	Ekaterina Yashina								1		3	0	4
4	Daria Zelinskaya								1		3	0	4
4	Giulia Safina Popa (ROU)									4		4	0
4	Leyla Brítez Risso (PAR)									3	1	3	1
4	Ekaterina Tupitsyna									3	1	2	1
4	Lee Ha-eum (KOR)									2	2	2	2
4	Rinko Matsuda (JPN)									2	2	2	2
4	Ren Yufei (CHN)									2	2	2	2
4	Ana Sofía Sánchez (MEX)									2	2	2	2
4	Rikke de Koning (NED)									1	3	1	3
4	Yekaterina Dmitrichenko (KAZ)									1	3	1	3
4	Doğa Türkmen (TUR)									1	3	1	3
4	Clarissa Blomqvist (FIN)										4	0	4
4	Astrid Wanja Brune Olsen (NOR)										4	0	4
4	Ava Hrastar (USA)										4	0	4
4	Victoria Mulville (USA)										4	0	4
4	Natalija Senić (SRB)										4	0	4
3	Kristina Liutova	2						1				3	0
3	Noma Noha Akugue (GER)	1		1		1						3	0
3	Mananchaya Sawangkaew (THA)	1		1					1			2	1
3	Li Zongyu (CHN)	1			1		1					1	2
3	Cho I-hsuan (TPE)		2		1							0	3
3	Cho Yi-tsen (TPE)		2		1							0	3
3	Alicia Herrero Liñana (ESP)		2				1					0	3
3	Anna Rogers (USA)		2				1					0	3
3	Lucija Ćirić Bagarić (CRO)		2						1			0	3
3	Alexandra Osborne (AUS)		2						1			0	3
3	Kayla Cross (CAN)		1	1		1						2	1
3	Joanna Garland (TPE)			3								3	0
3	Laura Samson (CZE)			2	1							2	1
3	Lisa Pigato (ITA)			2				1				3	0
3	Hayu Kinoshita (JPN)			1	1			1				2	1
3	Jennifer Ruggeri (ITA)			1				1	1			2	1
3	Francisca Jorge (POR)				3							0	3
3	Madeleine Brooks (GBR)				2		1					0	3
3	Momoko Kobori (JPN)				2		1					0	3
3	Elena Micic (AUS)				1		2					0	3
3	Caijsa Hennemann (SWE)				1		1	1				1	2
3	Raphaëlle Lacasse (CAN)				1		1		1			0	3
3	Sofya Lansere				1		1		1			0	3
3	Lisa Zaar (SWE)				1		1		1			0	3
3	Deborah Chiesa (ITA)				1			1	1			1	2
3	Tara Würth (CRO)				1			1		1		2	1
3	Lee Ya-hsin (TPE)				1				2			0	3
3	Gaia Maduzzi (ITA)				1				2			0	3
3	Michaela Bayerlová (CZE)				1				1		1	0	3
3	Carson Tanguilig (USA)				1					1	1	1	2
3	Celia Cerviño Ruiz (ESP)				1						2	0	3
3	Céline Naef (SUI)					3						3	0
3	Nastasja Schunk (GER)					2	1					2	1
3	Malaika Rapolu (USA)					2		1				3	0
3	Wang Xiyu (CHN)					2		1				3	0
3	Anastasiia Sobolieva (UKR)					2			1			2	1
3	Darya Astakhova					1		1	1			2	1
3	Kyōka Okamura (JPN)					1		1	1			2	1
3	Samira De Stefano (ITA)					1		1		1		3	0
3	Li Yu-yun (TPE)						3					0	3
3	Maria Golovina						2	1				1	2
3	Valeriya Strakhova (UKR)						2	1				1	2
3	Tiphanie Lemaître (FRA)						1	1	1			1	2
3	Abigail Rencheli (USA)						1		2			0	3
3	Guo Meiqi (CHN)						1		1		1	0	3
3	Liu Min (CHN)						1		1		1	0	3
3	Carlotta Moccia (ITA)						1		1		1	0	3
3	Camila Romero (ECU)						1		1		1	0	3
3	Carolina Alves (BRA)							3				3	0
3	Akasha Urhobo (USA)							3				3	0
3	Lizette Cabrera (AUS)							2	1			2	1
3	Lucía Cortez Llorca (ESP)							2	1			2	1
3	Julia Stusek (GER)							1	2			1	2
3	Aurora Zantedeschi (ITA)							1	1		1	1	2
3	Ariana Geerlings (ESP)							1		2		3	0
3	Anna Kubareva							1		2		3	0
3	Alina Shcherbinina							1		2		3	0
3	Anastasia Zolotareva							1		2		3	0
3	Antonia Stoyanov (NED)							1		1	1	2	1
3	Jaeda Daniel (USA)								3			0	3
3	Francesca Pace (ITA)								3			0	3
3	Briana Szabó (ROU)								3			0	3
3	Zheng Wushuang (CHN)								3			0	3
3	Jasmijn Gimbrère (NED)								2	1		1	2
3	Kristina Novak (SLO)								2		1	0	3
3	Maria Sholokhova								2		1	0	3
3	Demi Tran (NED)								2		1	0	3
3	Eva Marie Voracek (GER)								2		1	0	3
3	Yuan Chengyiyi (CHN)								1	2		2	1
3	Carolina Bohrer Martins (BRA)								1	1	1	1	2
3	Jenny Lim (FRA)								1	1	1	1	2
3	Laïa Petretic (FRA)								1	1	1	1	2
3	Denisa Žoldáková (CZE)								1	1	1	1	2
3	Jenny Dürst (SUI)								1		2	0	3
3	Sol Ailin Larraya Guidi (ARG)								1		2	0	3
3	Matilde Mariani (ITA)								1		2	0	3
3	Federica Sacco (ITA)								1		2	0	3
3	Alina Yuneva								1		2	0	3
3	Milana Zhabrailova								1		2	0	3
3	Ashley Lahey (USA)									3		3	0
3	Neus Torner Sensano (ESP)									3		3	0
3	Amelie Justine Hejtmanek (CZE)									2	1	2	1
3	Valentina Ivanov (NZL)									2	1	2	1
3	Adithya Karunaratne (HKG)									2	1	2	1
3	Lucie Petruzelová (CZE)									2	1	2	1
3	Duru Söke (TUR)									2	1	2	1
3	Dune Vaissaud (FRA)									2	1	2	1
3	Patcharin Cheapchandej (THA)									1	2	1	2
3	Bárbara Gatica (CHI)									1	2	1	2
3	Jeong Bo-young (KOR)									1	2	1	2
3	Lucie Pawlak (FRA)									1	2	1	2
3	Karla Popović (CRO)									1	2	1	2
3	Sandra Samir (EGY)									1	2	1	2
3	Alja Senica (SLO)									1	2	1	2
3	Ștefania Bojică (ROU)										3	0	3
3	Coco Bosman (NED)										3	0	3
3	Anchisa Chanta (THA)										3	0	3
3	Ingkar Dyussebay (KAZ)										3	0	3
3	Anastasiia Firman (UKR)										3	0	3
3	Hou Yanan (CHN)										3	0	3
3	Luca Kalman (HUN)										3	0	3
3	Nanari Katsumi (JPN)										3	0	3
3	Kim Na-ri (KOR)										3	0	3
3	Sofia Meabe (ARG)										3	0	3
3	Anna Mihálka (HUN)										3	0	3
3	Alexandra Vagramov (CAN)										3	0	3
3	Marie Villet (FRA)										3	0	3
3	Zhu Chenting (CHN)										3	0	3
2	Caroline Dolehide (USA)	2										2	0
2	Laura Pigossi (BRA)	1			1							1	1
2	Hannah Klugman (GBR)	1				1						2	0
2	You Xiaodi (CHN)	1							1			1	1
2	Harriet Dart (GBR)		2									0	2
2	Catherine Harrison (USA)		2									0	2
2	Ekaterina Ovcharenko		2									0	2
2	Eri Shimizu (JPN)		2									0	2
2	Dalayna Hewitt (USA)		1		1							0	2
2	Rasheeda McAdoo (USA)		1		1							0	2
2	Angelica Moratelli (ITA)		1				1					0	2
2	Misaki Matsuda (JPN)		1						1			0	2
2	Mell Elizabeth Reasco González (ECU)		1						1			0	2
2	Julia Avdeeva			2								2	0
2	Barbora Palicová (CZE)			2								2	0
2	Mia Ristić (SRB)			2								2	0
2	Sofia Costoulas (BEL)			1	1							1	1
2	Rada Zolotareva			1	1							1	1
2	Irene Burillo (ESP)			1		1						2	0
2	Julie Štruplová (CZE)			1		1						2	0
2	Jeline Vandromme (BEL)			1		1						2	0
2	Eva Vedder (NED)			1		1						2	0
2	Elizara Yaneva (BUL)			1		1						2	0
2	Julia Riera (ARG)			1			1					1	1
2	Bianca Andreescu (CAN)			1				1				2	0
2	Tyra Caterina Grant (ITA)			1				1				2	0
2	Federica Urgesi (ITA)			1				1				2	0
2	Sonja Zhiyenbayeva (KAZ)			1				1				2	0
2	Olivia Gadecki (AUS)				2							0	2
2	Viktória Hrunčáková (SVK)				2							0	2
2	Naïma Karamoko (SUI)				2							0	2
2	Fiona Crawley (USA)				1	1						1	1
2	Laura Hietaranta (FIN)				1		1					0	2
2	Sara Saito (JPN)				1		1					0	2
2	Sahaja Yamalapalli (IND)				1		1					0	2
2	Justina Mikulskytė (LTU)				1			1				1	1
2	Loes Ebeling Koning (NED)				1				1			0	2
2	Vittoria Paganetti (ITA)				1				1			0	2
2	Ankita Raina (IND)				1				1			0	2
2	Julieta Pareja (USA)					2						2	0
2	Harmony Tan (FRA)					2						2	0
2	Polina Iatcenko					1	1					1	1
2	İpek Öz (TUR)					1	1					1	1
2	Charo Esquiva Bañuls (ESP)					1		1				2	0
2	Lea Nilsson (SWE)					1		1				2	0
2	María García Cid (ESP)					1				1		2	0
2	Astra Sharma (AUS)					1				1		2	0
2	Jenna DeFalco (USA)					1					1	1	1
2	Diae El Jardi (MAR)						2					0	2
2	Georgina García Pérez (ESP)						2					0	2
2	Elena Malõgina (EST)						1	1				1	1
2	Gabriella Da Silva-Fick (AUS)						1		1			0	2
2	Yasmine Mansouri (FRA)						1		1			0	2
2	Tenika McGiffin (AUS)						1		1			0	2
2	Ekaterina Maklakova						1			1		1	1
2	Gabriela Cé (BRA)							2				2	0
2	Aliona Falei							2				2	0
2	Luisina Giovannini (ARG)							2				2	0
2	Amelia Honer (USA)							2				2	0
2	Alice Tubello (FRA)							2				2	0
2	Vaishnavi Adkar (IND)							1	1			1	1
2	Eryn Cayetano (USA)							1	1			1	1
2	Alina Granwehr (SUI)							1	1			1	1
2	Emma Kamper (DEN)							1	1			1	1
2	Priska Madelyn Nugroho (INA)							1	1			1	1
2	Park So-hyun (KOR)							1	1			1	1
2	Lucciana Pérez Alarcón (PER)							1	1			1	1
2	Andreea Prisăcariu (ROU)							1	1			1	1
2	Maaya Rajeshwaran Revathi (IND)							1	1			1	1
2	Margaux Rouvroy (FRA)							1	1			1	1
2	Madison Sieg (USA)							1	1			1	1
2	Camilla Zanolini (ITA)							1	1			1	1
2	Océane Babel (FRA)							1		1		2	0
2	Sofia Johnson (GBR)							1		1		2	0
2	Polina Leykina							1		1		2	0
2	Victoria Milovanova							1		1		2	0
2	Ekaterina Perelygina (AUT)							1		1		2	0
2	Nadia Podoroska (ARG)							1		1		2	0
2	Kanon Sawashiro (JPN)							1		1		2	0
2	Justina María González Daniele (ARG)							1			1	1	1
2	Daria Khamutsianskaya							1			1	1	1
2	Emma Léné (FRA)							1			1	1	1
2	Lin Yujun (CHN)							1			1	1	1
2	Kayo Nishimura (JPN)							1			1	1	1
2	Anastasia Abbagnato (ITA)								2			0	2
2	Jodie Burrage (GBR)								2			0	2
2	Haley Giavara (USA)								2			0	2
2	Yasmine Kabbaj (MAR)								2			0	2
2	Anri Nagata (JPN)								2			0	2
2	Tsao Chia-yi (TPE)								2			0	2
2	Beatrise Zeltiņa (LAT)								2			0	2
2	Gina Feistel (POL)								1	1		1	1
2	Yelyzaveta Kotliar (UKR)								1	1		1	1
2	Edda Mamedova								1	1		1	1
2	Welles Newman (USA)								1	1		1	1
2	Wei Sijia (CHN)								1	1		1	1
2	Aliona Bolsova (ESP)								1		1	0	2
2	Kailey Evans (USA)								1		1	0	2
2	Capucine Jauffret (USA)								1		1	0	2
2	Tereza Krejčová (CZE)								1		1	0	2
2	Fernanda Labraña (CHI)								1		1	0	2
2	Ksenia Laskutova								1		1	0	2
2	Dora Mišković (CRO)								1		1	0	2
2	Sera Nishimoto (JPN)								1		1	0	2
2	Amelia Paszun (POL)								1		1	0	2
2	Thaísa Grana Pedretti (BRA)								1		1	0	2
2	Amy Stevens (AUS)								1		1	0	2
2	Belle Thompson (AUS)								1		1	0	2
2	Miriana Tona (ITA)								1		1	0	2
2	Maria Florencia Urrutia (ARG)								1		1	0	2
2	Noelia Zeballos (BOL)								1		1	0	2
2	Destanee Aiava (NZL)									2		2	0
2	Maria Andrienko									2		2	0
2	Carolyn Ansari (USA)									2		2	0
2	Victoria Bosio (ARG)									2		2	0
2	Deniz Dilek (TUR)									2		2	0
2	Ekaterina Dotsenko									2		2	0
2	Carmen Gallardo Guevara (ESP)									2		2	0
2	Kristina Kroitor									2		2	0
2	Lee Gyeong-seo (KOR)									2		2	0
2	Iva Primorac Pavičić (CRO)									2		2	0
2	Ann Akasha Ceuca (GER)									1	1	1	1
2	Emery Combs (USA)									1	1	1	1
2	Tiana Tian Deng (SWE)									1	1	1	1
2	Aya El Sayed (EGY)									1	1	1	1
2	Josefina Estévez (ARG)									1	1	1	1
2	Letícia Garcia Vidal (BRA)									1	1	1	1
2	Juliana Giaccio (ESP)									1	1	1	1
2	Sarah Iliev (FRA)									1	1	1	1
2	Kim Yu-jin (KOR)									1	1	1	1
2	Anastasia Lizunova									1	1	1	1
2	Mariia Makarova									1	1	1	1
2	Veronika Miroshnichenko									1	1	1	1
2	Michika Ozeki (JPN)									1	1	1	1
2	Berta Passola (ESP)									1	1	1	1
2	Nina Radovanović (FRA)									1	1	1	1
2	Diana-Ioana Simionescu (ROU)									1	1	1	1
2	Elza Tomase (LAT)									1	1	1	1
2	Federica Trevisan (ITA)									1	1	1	1
2	Charlotte van Zonneveld (NED)									1	1	1	1
2	Wang Jiayi (CHN)									1	1	1	1
2	Ekaterina Agureeva										2	0	2
2	Natsuho Arakawa (JPN)										2	0	2
2	Bianca Bărbulescu (ROU)										2	0	2
2	Anastasia Bertacchi (ITA)										2	0	2
2	Choi On-yu (KOR)										2	0	2
2	Nikola Daubnerová (SVK)										2	0	2
2	Chelsea Fontenel (SUI)										2	0	2
2	Roisin Gilheany (AUS)										2	0	2
2	Oriana Gniewkowska (POL)										2	0	2
2	Patricia Georgiana Goina (ROU)										2	0	2
2	Madelief Hageman (NED)										2	0	2
2	Yuka Hosoki (JPN)										2	0	2
2	Darya Kharlanova										2	0	2
2	Yoana Konstantinova (BUL)										2	0	2
2	İrem Kurt (TUR)										2	0	2
2	Lin Fang-an (TPE)										2	0	2
2	Maxine Murphy (USA)										2	0	2
2	Ginevra Parentini Vallega Montebruno (ITA)										2	0	2
2	Peangtarn Plipuech (THA)										2	0	2
2	Dominika Podhajecka (POL)										2	0	2
2	Wang Meiling (CHN)										2	0	2
2	Zhang Ruien (CHN)										2	0	2
1	Elina Avanesyan (ARM)	1										1	0
1	Ekaterine Gorgodze (GEO)	1										1	0
1	Elvina Kalieva (USA)	1										1	0
1	Teodora Kostović (SRB)	1										1	0
1	Tatjana Maria (GER)	1										1	0
1	Yuki Naito (JPN)	1										1	0
1	Taylah Preston (AUS)	1										1	0
1	Lucrezia Stefanini (ITA)	1										1	0
1	Sloane Stephens (USA)	1										1	0
1	Lilli Tagger (AUT)	1										1	0
1	Renata Zarazúa (MEX)	1										1	0
1	Maia Lumsden (GBR)		1									0	1
1	Nika Radišić (SLO)		1									0	1
1	Valeriya Savinykh		1									0	1
1	Alana Smith (USA)		1									0	1
1	Darja Vidmanova (CZE)		1									0	1
1	Heather Watson (GBR)		1									0	1
1	Ayla Aksu (TUR)			1								1	0
1	Erika Andreeva			1								1	0
1	Noemi Basiletti (ITA)			1								1	0
1	Francesca Curmi (MLT)			1								1	0
1	Talia Gibson (AUS)			1								1	0
1	Emerson Jones (AUS)			1								1	0
1	Anouk Koevermans (NED)			1								1	0
1	Alina Korneeva			1								1	0
1	Anastasia Kulikova (FIN)			1								1	0
1	Suzan Lamens (NED)			1								1	0
1	Claire Liu (USA)			1								1	0
1	Tereza Martincová (CZE)			1								1	0
1	Mia Pohánková (SVK)			1								1	0
1	Tatiana Prozorova			1								1	0
1	Kaitlin Quevedo (ESP)			1								1	0
1	Daria Snigur (UKR)			1								1	0
1	Sara Sorribes Tormo (ESP)			1								1	0
1	Maria Timofeeva (UZB)			1								1	0
1	Naiktha Bains (GBR)				1							0	1
1	Irina Bara (ROU)				1							0	1
1	Julie Belgraver (FRA)				1							0	1
1	Shrivalli Bhamidipaty (IND)				1							0	1
1	Tessa Johanna Brockmann (GER)				1							0	1
1	Yvonne Cavallé Reimers (ESP)				1							0	1
1	Eudice Chong (HKG)				1							0	1
1	Feng Shuo (CHN)				1							0	1
1	Anna-Lena Friedsam (GER)				1							0	1
1	Lucie Havlíčková (CZE)				1							0	1
1	Dalila Jakupović (SLO)				1							0	1
1	Natsumi Kawaguchi (JPN)				1							0	1
1	Gabriela Knutson (CZE)				1							0	1
1	Nauhany Vitória Leme da Silva (BRA)				1							0	1
1	Liang En-shuo (TPE)				1							0	1
1	Olivia Lincer (USA)				1							0	1
1	Alba Rey García (ESP)				1							0	1
1	Lara Salden (BEL)				1							0	1
1	Ivana Šebestová (CZE)				1							0	1
1	Ella Seidel (GER)				1							0	1
1	Wan I-wen (TPE)				1							0	1
1	Ye Qiuyu (CHN)				1							0	1
1	Maribella Zamarripa (USA)				1							0	1
1	Madison Brengle (USA)					1						1	0
1	Fiona Ferro (FRA)					1						1	0
1	Anastasia Gasanova					1						1	0
1	Séléna Janicijevic (FRA)					1						1	0
1	Ku Yeon-woo (KOR)					1						1	0
1	Jule Niemeier (GER)					1						1	0
1	Kajsa Rinaldo Persson (SWE)					1						1	0
1	Raluca Șerban (CYP)					1						1	0
1	Dalila Spiteri (ITA)					1						1	0
1	Yao Xinxin (CHN)					1						1	0
1	Carol Young Suh Lee (USA)					1						1	0
1	Rutuja Bhosale (IND)						1					0	1
1	Brooke Black (GBR)						1					0	1
1	Nuria Brancaccio (ITA)						1					0	1
1	María Lourdes Carlé (ARG)						1					0	1
1	Ylena In-Albon (SUI)						1					0	1
1	Iva Ivanova (BUL)						1					0	1
1	Lia Karatantcheva (BUL)						1					0	1
1	Martha Matoula (GRE)						1					0	1
1	Tayisiya Morderger (GER)						1					0	1
1	Yana Morderger (GER)						1					0	1
2	Jazmín Ortenzi (ARG)						2					0	2
1	Despina Papamichail (GRE)						1					0	1
1	Kira Pavlova						1					0	1
1	Zuzanna Pawlikowska (POL)						1					0	1
1	Elena Pridankina						1					0	1
1	Ekaterina Reyngold						1					0	1
1	Mika Stojsavljevic (GBR)						1					0	1
1	Tian Fangran (CHN)						1					0	1
1	Mimi Xu (GBR)						1					0	1
1	Yang Yidi (CHN)						1					0	1
1	Bai Zhuoxuan (CHN)							1				1	0
1	Susan Bandecchi (SUI)							1				1	0
1	Cadence Brace (CAN)							1				1	0
1	Clara Burel (FRA)							1				1	0
1	Diletta Cherubini (ITA)							1				1	0
1	Anastasija Cvetković (SRB)							1				1	0
1	Weronika Ewald (POL)							1				1	0
1	Rachel Gailis (USA)							1				1	0
1	Dana Guzmán (PER)							1				1	0
1	Daria Kuczer (POL)							1				1	0
1	Connie Ma (USA)							1				1	0
1	Lea Ma (USA)							1				1	0
1	Verena Meliss (ITA)							1				1	0
1	Teodora Miron (ROU)							1				1	0
1	Yuriko Lily Miyazaki (GBR)							1				1	0
1	Jessica Pieri (ITA)							1				1	0
1	Valentina Ryser (SUI)							1				1	0
1	Rina Saigo (JPN)							1				1	0
1	Ena Shibahara (JPN)							1				1	0
1	Kristiana Sidorova							1				1	0
1	Stéphanie Visscher (NED)							1				1	0
1	Luna Vujović (SRB)							1				1	0
1	Katarina Zavatska (UKR)							1				1	0
1	Alyssa Ahn (USA)								1			0	1
1	Victoria Allen (GBR)								1			0	1
1	Emily Appleton (GBR)								1			0	1
1	Haruna Arakawa (JPN)								1			0	1
1	Yara Bartashevich (FRA)								1			0	1
1	Nahia Berecoechea (FRA)								1			0	1
1	Martina Capurro Taborda (ARG)								1			0	1
1	Carmen Corley (USA)								1			0	1
1	Ivana Corley (USA)								1			0	1
1	Sara Daavettila (USA)								1			0	1
1	Dang Yiming (CHN)								1			0	1
1	Jenna Dean (USA)								1			0	1
1	Ria Derniković (CRO)								1			0	1
1	Victoria Gómez O'Hayon (ESP)								1			0	1
1	Marian Gómez Pezuela Cano (MEX)								1			0	1
1	Jordyn Hazelitt (USA)								1			0	1
1	Carmen Andreea Herea (ROU)								1			0	1
1	Jéssica Hinojosa Gómez (MEX)								1			0	1
1	Alevtina Ibragimova								1			0	1
1	Jang Su-jeong (KOR)								1			0	1
1	Lauryn John-Baptiste (GBR)								1			0	1
1	Nadiia Kolb (UKR)								1			0	1
1	Maria Kononova								1			0	1
1	Elena Korokozidi (GRE)								1			0	1
1	Vilma Krebs Hyllested (DEN)								1			0	1
1	Mathilde Lollia (FRA)								1			0	1
1	Violeta Martinez (USA)								1			0	1
1	Kaya Moe (USA)								1			0	1
1	Rebecca Munk Mortensen (DEN)								1			0	1
1	Mio Mushika (JPN)								1			0	1
1	Sada Nahimana (BDI)								1			0	1
1	Paula Ormaechea (ARG)								1			0	1
1	Kristina Paskauskas (GBR)								1			0	1
1	Qu Yihan (CHN)								1			0	1
1	Lexington Reed (USA)								1			0	1
1	Arantxa Rus (NED)								1			0	1
1	Anna Sedysheva								1			0	1
1	Hibah Shaikh (USA)								1			0	1
1	Shao Yushan (CHN)								1			0	1
1	Vasanti Shinde (IND)								1			0	1
1	Oana Georgeta Simion (ROU)								1			0	1
1	Ksenia Smirnova								1			0	1
1	Mariia Tkacheva								1			0	1
1	Shruti Ahlawat (IND)									1		1	0
1	Ilinca Amariei (ROU)									1		1	0
1	Arina Arifullina									1		1	0
1	Sofia Barháčová (SVK)									1		1	0
1	Kamilla Bartone									1		1	0
1	Jana Bojović (SRB)									1		1	0
1	Mika Buchnik (ISR)									1		1	0
1	Agustina Chlpac (ARG)									1		1	0
1	Lisa Claeys (BEL)									1		1	0
1	Mayu Crossley (JPN)									1		1	0
1	Sara Dahlström (SWE)									1		1	0
1	Selina Dal (GER)									1		1	0
1	Zeel Desai (IND)									1		1	0
1	Lidia Encheva (BUL)									1		1	0
1	Tatum Evans (USA)									1		1	0
1	Mara Guth (GER)									1		1	0
1	Imogen Haddad (GBR)									1		1	0
1	Mia Horvit (USA)									1		1	0
1	Mia Kupres (CAN)									1		1	0
1	Miho Kuramochi (JPN)									1		1	0
1	Shannon Lam (USA)									1		1	0
1	Mariia Lazarenko (UKR)									1		1	0
1	Marta Lombardini (ITA)									1		1	0
1	Daria Lopatetska (UKR)									1		1	0
1	Pia Lovrič (SLO)									1		1	0
1	Tena Lukas (CRO)									1		1	0
1	Laura Mair (ITA)									1		1	0
1	Alexandra Malova									1		1	0
1	Margaux Maquet (BEL)									1		1	0
1	Iva Marinkovic (SWE)									1		1	0
1	Marie Mettraux (SUI)									1		1	0
1	Alexis Nguyen (USA)									1		1	0
1	Maileen Nuudi (EST)									1		1	0
1	María Oliver Sánchez (ESP)									1		1	0
1	Maria Sara Popa (ROU)									1		1	0
1	Sofia Rojas (USA)									1		1	0
1	Ruth Roura Llaverías (ESP)									1		1	0
1	Emily Sartz-Lunde (NOR)									1		1	0
1	Ashleigh Simes (AUS)									1		1	0
1	Emma Slavíková (CZE)									1		1	0
1	Ksenia Smirnova									1		1	0
1	Indianna Spink (GBR)									1		1	0
1	Darja Suvirdjonkova (SRB)									1		1	0
1	Lian Tran (NED)									1		1	0
1	Katerina Tsygourova (SUI)									1		1	0
1	Mutsumi Uemura (JPN)									1		1	0
1	Jahnie van Zyl (RSA)									1		1	0
1	Marilouise van Zyl (RSA)									1		1	0
1	Wang Jiaqi (CHN)									1		1	0
1	İlay Yörük (TUR)									1		1	0
1	Zhang Junhan (CHN)									1		1	0
1	Isabella Angelina Abendroth (GER)										1	0	1
1	Jolie Angelique Abendroth (GER)										1	0	1
1	Hania Abouelsaad (EGY)										1	0	1
1	Mayuka Aikawa (JPN)										1	0	1
1	Warda Ait el Bachir (NED)										1	0	1
1	Camille Allegre (USA)										1	0	1
1	Olivia Allegre (USA)										1	0	1
1	Eva Álvarez Sande (ESP)										1	0	1
1	Manon Arcangioli (FRA)										1	0	1
1	Marianne Argyrokastriti (GRE)										1	0	1
1	Valeriia Artemeva										1	0	1
1	Lourdes Ayala (ARG)										1	0	1
1	Isabella Barrera Aguirre (USA)										1	0	1
1	Victoria Luiza Barros (BRA)										1	0	1
1	Annika Barth (NED)										1	0	1
1	Kristina Belkova										1	0	1
1	Margarita Betova										1	0	1
1	Olga Bienzobas Fernandez (ESP)										1	0	1
1	Sophia Biolay (FRA)										1	0	1
1	Melinda Bíró (HUN)										1	0	1
1	Laura Böhner (GER)										1	0	1
1	Liv Boulard (FRA)										1	0	1
1	Ophélie Boullay (FRA)										1	0	1
1	Melissa Boyden (GBR)										1	0	1
1	Midori Castillo Meza (MEX)										1	0	1
1	Ava Catanzarite (USA)										1	0	1
1	Chen Mengyi (CHN)										1	0	1
1	Chen Yiru (CHN)										1	0	1
1	Kayla Chung (USA)										1	0	1
1	Milena Ciocan (FRA)										1	0	1
1	Defne Çırpanlı (TUR)										1	0	1
1	Elizabeth Coleman (USA)										1	0	1
1	Alba María Coromina Boluda (ESP)										1	0	1
1	Olivia de los Reyes (USA)										1	0	1
1	Sabrina Dias (BRA)										1	0	1
1	Cristina Diaz Adrover (ESP)										1	0	1
1	Kristina Dmitruk										1	0	1
1	Mariya Dobreva (CAN)										1	0	1
1	Kate Fakih (USA)										1	0	1
1	Greta Fenyves (HUN)										1	0	1
1	Alice Ferlito (ESP)										1	0	1
1	Chiara Fornasieri (ITA)										1	0	1
1	Isabella Foshee (USA)										1	0	1
1	Nada Fouad (EGY)										1	0	1
1	Francesca Gandolfi (ITA)										1	0	1
1	Julia García (MEX)										1	0	1
1	Camilla Gennaro (ITA)										1	0	1
1	Jimar Gerald González (CHI)										1	0	1
1	Maddalena Giordano (ITA)										1	0	1
1	Ana Victoria Gobbi Monllau (ARG)										1	0	1
1	Daria Gorska (POL)										1	0	1
1	Jade Groen (NED)										1	0	1
1	Ahmani Guichard (USA)										1	0	1
1	Ella Haavisto (FIN)										1	0	1
1	Han Jiangxue (CHN)										1	0	1
1	Sarafina Olivia Hansen (DEN)										1	0	1
1	Amane Hattori (JPN)										1	0	1
1	Iida Heinonen (FIN)										1	0	1
1	María Herazo (COL)										1	0	1
1	Mariana Isabel Higuita Barraza (COL)										1	0	1
1	Katherine Hui (USA)										1	0	1
1	Sara Husar (POL)										1	0	1
1	Eva Maria Ionescu (ROU)										1	0	1
1	Alison Nicole Isaacs (USA)										1	0	1
1	Dasha Ivanova (USA)										1	0	1
1	Jang Ga-eul (KOR)										1	0	1
1	Jialin Tian (CHN)										1	0	1
1	Riko Kikawada (JPN)										1	0	1
1	Cherry Kim (KOR)										1	0	1
1	Kim Da-bin (KOR)										1	0	1
1	Ema Kovacevic (BEL)										1	0	1
1	Tea Kovačević (BIH)										1	0	1
1	Isabella Kruger (RSA)										1	0	1
1	Polina Kuharenko										1	0	1
1	Veronika Kulhavá (CZE)										1	0	1
1	Lunda Kumhom (THA)										1	0	1
1	Ada Kumru (TUR)										1	0	1
1	Josephine Kunz (SUI)										1	0	1
1	Cindy Langlais (FRA)										1	0	1
1	Annemarie Lazar (GER)										1	0	1
1	Shihomi Leong (MAS)										1	0	1
1	Ustiniya Lekomtseva										1	0	1
1	Liu Leyi (CHN)										1	0	1
1	Romane Longueville (BEL)										1	0	1
1	Lavinia Luciano (ITA)										1	0	1
1	Sophie Luescher (SUI)										1	0	1
1	Luo Xi (CHN)										1	0	1
1	Ma Ruoxi (CHN)										1	0	1
1	Montserrat Marrón Baruqui (MEX)										1	0	1
1	Naomi McKenzie (AUS)										1	0	1
1	Nikol Mircheva (GER)										1	0	1
1	Miyu Nakashima (JPN)										1	0	1
1	Gréta Nemcsek (HUN)										1	0	1
1	Rose Marie Nijkamp (NED)										1	0	1
1	Akanksha Nitture (IND)										1	0	1
1	Salakthip Ounmuang (THA)										1	0	1
1	Gabriela Paun (ESP)										1	0	1
1	Erin Pearce (GBR)										1	0	1
1	Marcelina Podlińska (POL)										1	0	1
1	Laetitia Pulchartová (CZE)										1	0	1
1	Angelica Raggi (ITA)										1	0	1
1	Merna Refaat (EGY)										1	0	1
1	Alyssa Réguer (FRA)										1	0	1
1	Stella Remander (FIN)										1	0	1
1	Gloria Reusch (GER)										1	0	1
1	Camila Rodero (CHI)										1	0	1
1	Kseniia Ruchkina										1	0	1
1	Anastasia Safta (ROU)										1	0	1
1	Aruzhan Sagandykova (KAZ)										1	0	1
1	Vivien Sandberg (GER)										1	0	1
1	Himari Sato (JPN)										1	0	1
1	Viktoriia Sedenkova										1	0	1
1	Linda Ševčíková (CZE)										1	0	1
1	Kate Sharabura (USA)										1	0	1
1	Shin Ji-ho (KOR)										1	0	1
1	Maria Shmeleva										1	0	1
1	Mia Slama (USA)										1	0	1
1	Amélie Šmejkalová (CZE)										1	0	1
1	Alice Soulié (FRA)										1	0	1
1	Julia Stamatova (BUL)										1	0	1
1	Polina Starkova										1	0	1
1	Helena Stevic (FRA)										1	0	1
1	Alana Subasic (AUS)										1	0	1
1	Sun Yingqun (CHN)										1	0	1
1	Minami Suzuki (JPN)										1	0	1
1	Lavinia Tănăsie (ROU)										1	0	1
1	Eliška Ticháčková (CZE)										1	0	1
1	Anita Tu (USA)										1	0	1
1	Amélie van Impe (BEL)										1	0	1
1	Klara Veldman (NED)										1	0	1
1	Laima Vladson (UZB)										1	0	1
1	Wang Yuhan (CHN)										1	0	1
1	Marie Weckerle (LUX)										1	0	1
1	Anja Wildgruber (GER)										1	0	1
1	Wu Ruxi (CHN)										1	0	1
1	Xu Jiayu (CHN)										1	0	1
1	Mia Yamakita (USA)										1	0	1
1	Sevil Yuldasheva (UZB)										1	0	1

=== Titles won by nation ===
Updated as of 23 November

Total	Nation	W100		W75		W50		W35		W15		Total	
Total	Nation	S	D	S	D	S	D	S	D	S	D	S	D
126	United States (USA)	4	9	3	8	11	9	20	23	14	25	52	74
65	China (CHN)	2	1		3	5	6	3	10	13	22	23	42
61	Japan (JPN)	1	2	1	4	2	3	10	12	13	13	26	35
61	Italy (ITA)	1	1	6	3	2	3	12	15	5	13	26	35
61	France (FRA)				1	5	3	6	11	11	24	22	39
59	Czech Republic (CZE)		3	7	11	7	4	4	7	6	9	25	34
57	Great Britain (GBR)	2	3	1	6	3	8	8	11	6	9	20	37
49	Germany (GER)	2		1	2	4	3	4	12	8	13	19	30
47	Netherlands (NED)			3	2	1	6	5	9	6	15	15	32
46	Spain (ESP)	1	2	3	2	5	4	6	3	12	8	27	19
37	Ukraine (UKR)			3		2	4	3	6	7	12	15	22
35	Romania (ROU)				2		2	2	8	8	13	10	25
34	South Korea (KOR)					1		4	9	6	14	11	23
30	Argentina (ARG)			1			3	4	6	6	10	11	19
28	Australia (AUS)	1	2	2	3	1	3	2	6	2	6	8	20
26	Brazil (BRA)	1			1			5	5	5	9	11	15
25	Poland (POL)			1	2		3	4	5	3	7	8	17
23	Serbia (SRB)	1		2	1		3	4	2	4	6	11	12
23	Switzerland (SUI)				2	3	1	3	2	4	8	10	13
22	Egypt (EGY)								2	8	12	8	14
21	Slovakia (SVK)			1	3		1	1	6	6	3	8	13
19	Thailand (THA)	1		1					1	4	12	6	13
19	Kazakhstan (KAZ)		1	1			2	1		4	10	6	13
18	Mexico (MEX)	1					1		3	2	11	3	15
18	Chinese Taipei (TPE)		3	3	4		3		3		2	3	15
18	Greece (GRE)				2		5	2	8		1	2	16
17	Belgium (BEL)	2		4	3	1				2	5	9	8
16	Canada (CAN)		1	2	1	1	1	2	2	1	5	6	10
16	Turkey (TUR)			1		1	1			6	7	8	8
14	Croatia (CRO)		2		1			1	2	5	3	6	8
14	New Zealand (NZL)						1		4	4	5	4	10
12	Bulgaria (BUL)			1	1	1	3	2		1	3	5	7
12	India (IND)				2		2	2	3	2	1	4	8
11	Sweden (SWE)				1	2	1	2	1	3	1	7	4
10	Chile (CHI)								1	3	6	3	7
9	Slovenia (SLO)		1		1				2	2	3	2	7
9	Hungary (HUN)				1				2	1	5	1	8
8	Hong Kong (HKG)		1		1				2	2	2	2	6
8	Finland (FIN)			1	1		1				5	1	7
8	Colombia (COL)								1		7	0	8
7	Kenya (KEN)		1		1		1	1	3			1	6
7	Venezuela (VEN)						1		2	1	3	1	6
6	Lithuania (LTU)				1		1	1		1	2	2	4
5	Ecuador (ECU)		1				1		2		1	0	5
5	Norway (NOR)									1	4	1	4
4	Portugal (POR)				3	1						1	3
4	Morocco (MAR)						2		2			0	4
4	Denmark (DEN)							1	2		1	1	3
4	Latvia (LAT)								2	1	1	1	3
4	Paraguay (PAR)									3	1	3	1
3	Austria (AUT)	1						1		1		3	0
3	Uzbekistan (UZB)			1							2	1	2
3	Estonia (EST)						1	1		1		2	1
3	Peru (PER)							2	1			2	1
3	South Africa (RSA)									2	1	2	1
2	Indonesia (INA)							1	1			1	1
2	Bolivia (BOL)								1		1	0	2
1	Armenia (ARM)	1										1	0
1	Georgia (GEO)	1										1	0
1	Malta (MLT)			1								1	0
1	Cyprus (CYP)					1						1	0
1	Burundi (BDI)								1			0	1
1	Israel (ISR)									1		1	0
1	Bosnia and Herzegovina (BIH)										1	0	1
1	Luxembourg (LUX)										1	0	1
1	Malaysia (MAS)										1	0	1

== Retirements ==
The following is a list of notable players who announced their retirement from professional tennis during the 2026 season:

- (Zimbabwe) Valeria Bhunu joined the professional tour in 2014 and reached career-high rankings of No. 497 in singles in November 2016 and No. 534 in doubles in November 2016. She won three singles titles on the ITF Women's World Tennis Tour. Bhunu announced her retirement in February 2026.
- (Netherlands) Arianne Hartono joined the professional tour in 2018 and reached career-high rankings of No. 135 in singles in April 2024 and No. 123 in doubles in July 2022. She won three singles and twenty one doubles titles on the ITF Women's World Tennis Tour. Hartono announced her retirement in March 2026.
- (Croatia) Tereza Mrdeža joined the professional tour in 2007 and reached career-high rankings of No. 150 in singles in October 2015 and No. 163 in doubles in April 2018. She won eight singles and four one doubles titles on the ITF Women's World Tennis Tour. Mrdeza announced retired from professional tennis in May 2026, having made her final appearance at the 2026 French Open.
- (France) Alice Robbe joined the professional tour in 2014 and reached career-high rankings of No. 190 in singles in May 2023 and No. 285 in doubles in July 2023. She won three singles and eight doubles titles on the ITF Woman's World Tennis Tour. Robbe announced her retirement in June 2026.
- (United Kingdom) Katy Dunne joined the professional tour in 2013 and reached career-high rankings of No. 212 in singles in May 2018 and No. 135 in doubles in July 2018. She won nine singles and eight doubles titles on the ITF Women's World Tennis Tour. Dunne announced her retirement in June 2026, having made her final appearance at the 2026 Wimbledon Championships.
- (Japan) Shiho Akita joined the professional tour in 2007 and reached career-high rankings of No. 221 in singles in May 2017 and No. 369 in doubles in September 2016. She won seven singles and four doubles titles on the ITF Women's World Tennis Tour. Akita announced her retirement in March 2026.
- (Peru) Anastasia Iamachkine joined the professional tour in 2015 and reached career-high rankings of No. 713 in singles in July 2023 and No. 439 in doubles in August 2023. She won four doubles titles on the ITF Women's World Tennis Tour. Iamachkine announced her retirement in July 2026.
- (Switzerland) Ylena In-Albon joined the professional tour in 2014 and reached career-high rankings of No. 110 in singles in June 2022 and No. 225 in doubles in February 2020. She won twelve singles and 13 doubles titles on the ITF Women's World Tennis Tour. In-Albon announced her retirement in September 2026.
- (India) Sravya Shivani Chilakalapudi joined the professional tour in 2018 and reached career-high rankings of No. 900 in singles in April 2023 and No. 576 in doubles in June 2026. She won 3 doubles titles on the ITF Women's World Tennis Tour. Chilakalapudi announced her retirement in September 2026.

== See also ==
- 2026 WTA Tour
- 2026 WTA 125 tournaments
- 2026 ATP Challenger Tour
- 2026 ITF Men's World Tennis Tour
