= 2025 Copa Colsanitas – Singles =

Singles
- 2025 Copa Colsanitas

Final
- Champion: (Colombia) Camila Osorio
- Runner-up: (Poland) Katarzyna Kawa
- Score: 6–3, 6–3

Details
- Draw: 32
- Seeds: 8

Events
Singles	Doubles
- Copa Colsanitas

Defending champion Camila Osorio defeated Katarzyna Kawa in the final, 6–3, 6–3 to win the singles tennis title at the 2025 Copa Colsanitas. Osorio was the second player, after countrywoman Fabiola Zuluaga, to win three titles at the tournament. She saved a match point en route to the title, in the second round against Emina Bektas.

Aged 16 years and 1 month old, Julieta Pareja was the youngest player to reach a WTA Tour semifinal since Coco Gauff at the 2019 Upper Austria Ladies Linz Open.

== Seeds ==
1. (Czech Republic) Marie Bouzková (quarterfinals)
2. (Colombia) Camila Osorio (champion)
3. (United States) Alycia Parks (first round)
4. (Colombia) Emiliana Arango (first round)
5. (Germany) Laura Siegemund (first round)
6. (Germany) Tatjana Maria (quarterfinals)
7. (Spain) Sara Sorribes Tormo (first round)
8. (Spain) Cristina Bucșa (second round)

== Draw ==
Key

- Q = Qualifier
- WC = Wild card
- LL = Lucky loser
- Alt = Alternate
- ITF = ITF entry
- PR = Protected ranking
- SR = Special ranking
- SE = Special exempt
- JE = Junior exempt
- JR = Junior Accelerator Programme entrant
- CO = College Accelerator Programme entrant
- NG = Next Gen Accelerator Program entrant
- w/o = Walkover
- r = Retired
- d = Defaulted

=== Finals ===
Semifinals
Q	(Poland) Katarzyna Kawa	7	6
Q	(United States) Julieta Pareja	5	2
(Argentina) Julia Riera	4	5
2	(Colombia) Camila Osorio	6	7

Final
Q	(Poland) Katarzyna Kawa	3	3
2	(Colombia) Camila Osorio	6	6

=== Top half ===
First round
1	(Czech Republic) M Bouzková	6	3	6
Q	(Serbia) A Krunić	0	6	3
Q	(Cyprus) R Șerban	2	6	6
(Spain) N Párrizas Díaz	6	4	1
WC	(Colombia) V Mediorreal	1	1
Q	(Poland) K Kawa	6	6
(Brazil) L Pigossi	4	6	6
5	(Germany) L Siegemund	6	1	1
4	(Colombia) E Arango	3	3
LL	(Romania) PM Țig	6	6
Q	(United States) J Pareja	6	6
WC	(Colombia) MJ Sánchez Uribe	1	1
(Liechtenstein) K von Deichmann	4	5
(France) L Jeanjean	6	7
(France) S Janicijevic	6	6
7	(Spain) S Sorribes Tormo	1	2

Second round
1	(Czech Republic) M Bouzková	6	6
Q	(Cyprus) R Șerban	1	3
Q	(Poland) K Kawa	1	7^{7}	6
(Brazil) L Pigossi	6	6^{5}	3
LL	(Romania) PM Țig	3	6^{3}
Q	(United States) J Pareja	6	7^{7}
(France) L Jeanjean	6	6
(France) S Janicijevic	4	3

Quarterfinals
1	(Czech Republic) M Bouzková	7	1	5
Q	(Poland) K Kawa	5	6	7
Q	(United States) J Pareja	7^{7}	6
(France) L Jeanjean	6^{5}	3

Semifinals
Q	(Poland) K Kawa	7	6
Q	(United States) J Pareja	5	2

=== Bottom half ===
First round
8	(Spain) C Bucșa	6	6^{2}	6
(Switzerland) L Küng	1	7^{7}	1
Q	(Croatia) L Bošković	6	6
Q	(Romania) I Bara	4	4
(Argentina) J Riera	6	5	5
(United Kingdom) F Jones	2	7	3^{r}
(United States) I Jovic	6	6
3	(United States) A Parks	1	4
6	(Germany) T Maria	6^{5}	7	6
(France) C Paquet	7^{7}	5	4
(United States) V Lepchenko	6	1	2
(United States) H Chang	4	6	6
(United States) E Bektas	6	6
WC	(Colombia) M Torres Murcia	0	3
WC	(Colombia) MI Higuita	0	1
2	(Colombia) C Osorio	6	6

Second round
8	(Spain) C Bucșa	1	4
Q	(Croatia) L Bošković	6	6
(Argentina) J Riera	6	6
(United States) I Jovic	4	2
6	(Germany) T Maria	6	7^{7}
(United States) H Chang	0	6^{0}
(United States) E Bektas	6	6^{5}	2
2	(Colombia) C Osorio	1	7^{7}	6

Quarterfinals
Q	(Croatia) L Bošković	3	6	1
(Argentina) J Riera	6	2	6
6	(Germany) T Maria	1	3
2	(Colombia) C Osorio	6	6

Semifinals
(Argentina) J Riera	4	5
2	(Colombia) C Osorio	6	7

== Qualifying ==
=== Seeds ===
1. (Cyprus) Raluca Șerban (qualified)
2. (Poland) Katarzyna Kawa (qualified)
3. (Croatia) Lea Bošković (qualified)
4. (Argentina) Jazmín Ortenzi (first round)
5. (United States) Elizabeth Mandlik (first round)
6. (Romania) Irina Bara (qualified)
7. (Romania) Patricia Maria Țig (qualifying competition, lucky loser)
8. (Canada) Carol Zhao (first round)
9. (Brazil) Carolina Alves (qualifying competition)
10. (Italy) Nicole Fossa Huergo (qualifying competition)
11. (Ukraine) Valeriya Strakhova (qualifying competition)
12. (Slovenia) Dalila Jakupović (first round)

=== Qualifiers ===
1. (Cyprus) Raluca Șerban
2. (Poland) Katarzyna Kawa
3. (Croatia) Lea Bošković
4. (Serbia) Aleksandra Krunić
5. (United States) Julieta Pareja
6. (Romania) Irina Bara

=== Lucky loser ===
1. (Romania) Patricia Maria Țig

=== Qualifying draw ===
==== First qualifier ====
First round
1/WC	(Cyprus) Raluca Șerban	6	6
(United States) Victoria Hu	2	3
Mariia Tkacheva	2	3
10	(Italy) Nicole Fossa Huergo	6	6

Qualifying competition
1/WC	(Cyprus) Raluca Șerban	6	6
10	(Italy) Nicole Fossa Huergo	1	4

==== Second qualifier ====
First round
2	(Poland) Katarzyna Kawa	7^{7}	4	6
(Bulgaria) Gergana Topalova	6^{1}	6	4
(Italy) Miriana Tona	3	6^{2}
7	(Romania) Patricia Maria Țig	6	7^{7}

Qualifying competition
2	(Poland) Katarzyna Kawa	7	6^{2}	7^{8}
7	(Romania) Patricia Maria Țig	5	7^{7}	6^{6}

==== Third qualifier ====
First round
3	(Croatia) Lea Bošković	6	6
WC	(Colombia) Emanuela Lares	0	1
(Mexico) Victoria Rodríguez	2	2
9	(Brazil) Carolina Alves	6	6

Qualifying competition
3	(Croatia) Lea Bošković	7	4	6
9	(Brazil) Carolina Alves	5	6	0

==== Fourth qualifier ====
First round
4	(Argentina) Jazmín Ortenzi	6^{5}	2
Anastasia Tikhonova	7^{7}	6
(Serbia) Aleksandra Krunić	6	6
12	(Slovenia) Dalila Jakupović	2	2

Qualifying competition
Anastasia Tikhonova	3	3
(Serbia) Aleksandra Krunić	6	6

==== Fifth qualifier ====
First round
5	(United States) Elizabeth Mandlik	6	4	4
(Netherlands) Eva Vedder	3	6	6
WC	(United States) Julieta Pareja	7	6
8	(Canada) Carol Zhao	5	1

Qualifying competition
(Netherlands) Eva Vedder	4	4
WC	(United States) Julieta Pareja	6	6

==== Sixth qualifier ====
First round
6	(Romania) Irina Bara	7	6
WC	(Colombia) Yuliana Monroy	5	3
(Norway) Malene Helgø	1	4
11	(Ukraine) Valeriya Strakhova	6	6

Qualifying competition
6	(Romania) Irina Bara	6	6
11	(Ukraine) Valeriya Strakhova	4	3
