= 2024 Copa Colsanitas – Doubles =

Tennis tournament

Doubles
- 2024 Copa Colsanitas

Final
- Champions: (Spain) Cristina Bucșa; Kamilla Rakhimova
- Runners-up: (Hungary) Anna Bondár; Irina Khromacheva
- Score: 7–6^{(7–5)}, 3–6, [10–8]

Details
- Draw: 16
- Seeds: 4

Events
Singles	Doubles
← 2023 ·	Copa Colsanitas	· 2025 →

Cristina Bucșa and Kamilla Rakhimova defeated the defending champion Irina Khromacheva and her partner Anna Bondár in the final, 7–6^{(7–5)}, 3–6, [10–8] to win the doubles tennis title at the 2024 Copa Colsanitas.

Khromacheva and Iryna Shymanovich were the defending champions, but chose not to participate together. Shymanovich partnered Renata Zarazúa, but lost in the first round to You Xiaodi and Katarina Zavatska.

== Seeds ==
1. (Czech Republic) Marie Bouzková / (Spain) Sara Sorribes Tormo (semifinals)
2. (Georgia (country)) Oksana Kalashnikova / (Poland) Katarzyna Piter (first round)
3. (Hungary) Anna Bondár / Irina Khromacheva (final)
4. (Spain) Cristina Bucșa / Kamilla Rakhimova (champions)

== Draw ==
=== Key ===
- Q = Qualifier
- WC = Wild card
- LL = Lucky loser
- Alt = Alternate
- SE = Special exempt
- PR = Protected ranking
- ITF = ITF entry
- JE = Junior exempt
- w/o = Walkover
- r = Retired
- d = Defaulted
- SR = Special ranking

=== Draw ===
First round
1	(Czech Republic) M Bouzková (Spain) S Sorribes Tormo	6	5	[10]
Alt	(Canada) R Marino (Canada) C Zhao	2	7	[6]
WC	(Colombia) M Higuita (Colombia) V Mediorreal	3	5
WC	(Colombia) E Arango (Colombia) MP Pérez	6	7
4	(Spain) C Bucșa; K Rakhimova	6	6
(France) E Lechemia (Colombia) Y Lizarazo	2	4
(Venezuela) A Gámiz (United States) Q Gleason	2	4
(Argentina) J Riera (Serbia) N Stevanović	6	6
(United States) H Baptiste (United States) W Osuigwe	6^{4}	5
(Slovenia) D Jakupović (United States) S Santamaria	7^{7}	7
(Germany) J Lohoff (Switzerland) C Perrin	1	1
3	(Hungary) A Bondár; I Khromacheva	6	6
I Shymanovich (Mexico) R Zarazúa	2	1
Alt	(China) X You (Ukraine) K Zavatska	6	6
(Romania) I Bara (Ukraine) Y Starodubtseva	5	7	[10]
2	(Georgia (country)) O Kalashnikova (Poland) K Piter	7	5	[5]

Quarterfinals
1	(Czech Republic) M Bouzková (Spain) S Sorribes Tormo	6	6
WC	(Colombia) E Arango (Colombia) MP Pérez	1	3
4	(Spain) C Bucșa; K Rakhimova	7^{7}	6
(Argentina) J Riera (Serbia) N Stevanović	6^{4}	3
(Slovenia) D Jakupović (United States) S Santamaria	1	3
3	(Hungary) A Bondár; I Khromacheva	6	6
Alt	(China) X You (Ukraine) K Zavatska	7	6^{11}	[1]
(Romania) I Bara (Ukraine) Y Starodubtseva	5	7^{13}	[10]

Semifinals
1	(Czech Republic) M Bouzková (Spain) S Sorribes Tormo	3	6	[7]
4	(Spain) C Bucșa; K Rakhimova	6	1	[10]
3	(Hungary) A Bondár; I Khromacheva	3	6	[10]
(Romania) I Bara (Ukraine) Y Starodubtseva	6	1	[8]

Final
4	(Spain) C Bucșa; K Rakhimova	7^{7}	3	[10]
3	(Hungary) A Bondár; I Khromacheva	6^{5}	6	[8]
