= 2025 Copa Colsanitas =

- Date: 31 March–6 April
- Edition: 27th
- Category: WTA 250
- Draw: 32S / 16D
- Surface: Clay / outdoor
- Location: Bogotá, Colombia
- Venue: Country Club

Champions

Singles
- (Colombia) Camila Osorio

Doubles
- (Spain) Cristina Bucșa / (Spain) Sara Sorribes Tormo
← 2024 ·	Copa Colsanitas	· 2026 →

The 2025 Copa Colsanitas Zurich was a professional women's tennis tournament played on outdoor clay courts. It was the 27th edition of the tournament and part of the WTA 250 tournaments on the 2025 WTA Tour. It took place at the Country Club in Bogotá, Colombia, from 31 March to 6 April 2025.

== Champions ==
=== Singles ===
- (Colombia) Camila Osorio def. (Poland) Katarzyna Kawa 6–3, 6–3

=== Doubles ===
- (Spain) Cristina Bucșa / (Spain) Sara Sorribes Tormo def. (Romania) Irina Bara / (Brazil) Laura Pigossi 5–7, 6–2, [10–5]

== Singles main-draw entrants ==
=== Seeds ===
Country	Player	Ranking^{1}	Seed
CZE	Marie Bouzková	50	1
COL	Camila Osorio	54	2
USA	Alycia Parks	59	3
COL	Emiliana Arango	79	4
GER	Laura Siegemund	81	5
GER	Tatjana Maria	86	6
ESP	Sara Sorribes Tormo	87	7
ESP	Cristina Bucșa	91	8

- ^{1} Rankings as of 17 March 2025.

=== Other entrants ===
The following players received wildcards into the main draw:

- (Colombia) Mariana Isabel Higuita
- (Colombia) Valentina Mediorreal
- (Colombia) María José Sánchez Uribe
- (Colombia) María Torres Murcia

The following players received entry from the qualifying draw:

- (Romania) Irina Bara
- (Croatia) Lea Bošković
- (Poland) Katarzyna Kawa
- (Serbia) Aleksandra Krunić
- (United States) Julieta Pareja
- (Cyprus) Raluca Șerban

The following player received entry as a lucky loser:

- (Romania) Patricia Maria Țig

=== Withdrawals ===
- (Thailand) Mananchaya Sawangkaew → replaced by (Switzerland) Leonie Küng
- (Italy) Lucrezia Stefanini → replaced by (Romania) Patricia Maria Țig

== Doubles main draw entrants ==
=== Seeds ===
Country	Player	Country	Player	Rank^{1}	Seed
ESP	Cristina Bucșa	ESP	Sara Sorribes Tormo	68	1
GBR	Emily Appleton	USA	Quinn Gleason	167	2
~~CZE~~	~~Marie Bouzková~~	~~POL~~	~~Katarzyna Kawa~~	~~193~~	~~3~~
CAN	Ariana Arseneault	GEO	Oksana Kalashnikova	204	4

- Rankings are as of 17 March 2025.

=== Other entrants ===
The following pairs received wildcards into the doubles main draw:

- (Colombia) Mariana Isabel Higuita / (Colombia) María José Sánchez Uribe
- (Colombia) Valentina Mediorreal / (Colombia) María Paulina Pérez

The following pair received entry as alternates:

- (United States) Emina Bektas / (Serbia) Nina Stojanović

=== Withdrawals ===
- (Czech Republic) Marie Bouzková / (Poland) Katarzyna Kawa → replaced by (United States) Emina Bektas / (Serbia) Nina Stojanović
