= Tennis at the 2024 Bolivarian Youth Games =

Tennis competitions at the 2024 Bolivarian Youth Games

- Tennis pictogram
- Venue: Complejo de Tenis La Madona
- Dates: 6–8 April 2024
- Competitors: 25 from 7 nations

Champions
- Colombia (5 gold medals)

Tennis competitions at the 2024 Bolivarian Youth Games in Sucre, Bolivia were held from 4 to 7 April 2024 at Complejo de Tenis La Madona.

Five medal events were scheduled to be contested: singles and doubles for both boys and girls and mixed doubles. A total of 25 athletes (13 boys and 12 girls) competed in the events. Athletes had to be born between 1 January 2005 and 31 December 2008 to be eligible (ages 16 to 19).

Colombia dominated the tennis event by winning the 5 gold medals that were at stake, in addition to 1 silver medal.

== Schedule ==
The competitions were held over a 4-day period:

R1	First round	QF	Quarter-finals	SF	Semi-finals	M	Medal matches

Date Event	Tue 6	Wed 7	Thu 8	Fri 9
Boys' singles	R1	QF	SF	M
Boys' doubles		QF	SF	M
Girls' singles	R1	QF	SF	M
Girls' doubles		QF	SF	M
Mixed doubles		QF	SF	M

== Participating nations ==
All 7 ODEBO National Olympic Committees (NOCs) registered athletes for the tennis competitions. Each NOC was able to enter a maximum of 4 tennis players (2 per gender), with up to two players for each boys and girls singles events and one only pair for the doubles events.

Numbers in parentheses indicate the number of players entered the competition by each NOC.

- Bolivia (4)
- Chile (4)
- Colombia (4)
- Ecuador (4)
- Panama (2)
- Peru (4)
- Venezuela (3)

== Medal summary ==
=== Medal table ===
* Host nation (Bolivia)

Rank	NOC	Gold	Silver	Bronze	Total
1	Colombia (COL)	5	1	0	6
2	Bolivia (BOL)*	0	3	1	4
3	Peru (PER)	0	1	1	2
4	Venezuela (VEN)	0	0	2	2
5	Chile (CHI)	0	0	1	1
Totals (5 entries)		5	5	5	15

Source: I Bolivarian Youth Games Sucre 2024 – Tennis medals

=== Medalists ===
Event	Gold	Silver	Bronze
Boys' singles	Samuel Heredia; Colombia	Santiago Lora; Bolivia	Diego Muñoz; Bolivia
Boys' doubles	Colombia; Juan Trujillo; Samuel Heredia	Peru; Luis José Nakamine; Vicente Monge	Venezuela; José David Segovia; Juan Andrés Listo
Girls' singles	Valentina Mediorreal; Colombia	Mariana Higuita; Colombia	Yleymi Muelle; Peru
Girls' doubles	Colombia; Mariana Higuita; Valentina Mediorreal	Bolivia; Natalia Trigosso; Nathalie Marinovitch	Chile; Consuelo Alarcón; Josefa Fuenzalida
Mixed doubles	Colombia; Samuel Heredia; Valentina Mediorreal	Bolivia; Diego Muñoz; Natalia Trigosso	Venezuela; Andrea Magallanes; Juan Andrés Listo

== Results ==
The 5 events were played on a single-elimination basis and consisted of the first round (only for the boys' and girls' singles events), quarter-finals, semi-finals and the gold and bronze medal matches.

One round was held per day, from 4 to 7 April.

=== Boys' singles ===
First round
6 April, 9:00 – Court 1
Juan Trujillo (COL)	6	6
Chad Valdés Jr (PAN)	0	1
6 April, 9:00 – Court 2
Francisco Durán (CHI)	6	6
Miguel Larrea (ECU)	3	3
6 April, 9:00 – Central court
Juan Andrés Listo (VEN)	2	6	4
Santiago Lora (BOL)	6	2	6
6 April, 9:00 – Court 3
José David Segovia (VEN)	7	6
Marcelo Riveros (CHI)	5	4
6 April, 9:00 – Court 4
Guillermo Rodríguez (PAN)	4	6^{3}
Vicente Monge (PER)	6	7^{7}

Quarter-finals
7 April, 9:00 – Court 1
Luis José Nakamine (PER)	6	6
Juan Trujillo (COL)	3	3
7 April, 14:00 – Central court
Francisco Durán (CHI)	2	6	0
Santiago Lora (BOL)	6	4	6
7 April, 9:15 – Central court
José David Segovia (VEN)	4	5
Diego Muñoz (BOL)	6	7
7 April, 9:00 – Court 2
Vicente Monge (PER)	0	3
Samuel Heredia (COL)	6	6

Semi-finals
8 April, 11:30 – Central court
Luis José Nakamine (PER) (r)	7^{7}	0	0
Santiago Lora (BOL)	6^{5}	6	2
8 April, 9:45 – Court 1
Diego Muñoz (BOL)	5	1
Samuel Heredia (COL)	7	6

Gold medal match
9 April, 12:00 – Central court
Santiago Lora (BOL)	3	1
Samuel Heredia (COL)	6	6
Bronze medal match
9 April, 12:00 – Court 1
Luis José Nakamine (PER)	–
Diego Muñoz (BOL)	(w/o)

=== Girls' singles ===
First round
6 April, 11:45 – Central Court
Josefa Fuenzalida (CHI)	5	6	5
Gabriela Pimentel (PER)	7	2	7
6 April, 11:00 – Court 1
Bárbara Olvera (ECU)	4	6	6
Anna Bjornestad (PAN)	6	4	0
6 April, 11:00 – Court 2
Consuelo Alarcón (CHI)	6	6
Karla Ching (PAN)	0	0
6 April, 11:00 – Court 3
Yleymi Muelle (PER)	6	6
Andrea Magallanes (VEN)	3	2

Quarter-finals
7 April, 11:00 – Court 2
Valentina Mediorreal (COL)	7	6
Gabriela Pimentel (PER)	5	2
7 April, 11:00 – Court 1
Nathalie Marinovitch (BOL)	4	7^{7}	6
Bárbara Olvera (ECU)	6	6^{3}	3
7 April, 11:00 – Court 3
Consuelo Alarcón (CHI)	4	4
Mariana Higuita (COL)	6	6
7 April, 11:00 – Central Court
Yleymi Muelle (PER)	2	7	6
Natalia Trigosso (BOL)	6	5	2

Semi-finals
8 April, 9:45 – Central Court
Valentina Mediorreal (COL)	6	6
Nathalie Marinovitch (BOL)	4	2
8 April, 11:45 – Court 1
Mariana Higuita (COL)	6	6
Yleymi Muelle (PER)	1	4

Gold medal match
9 April, 10:00 – Central Court
Valentina Mediorreal (COL)	6	6
Mariana Higuita (COL)	4	0
Bronze medal match
9 April, 10:05 – Court 1
Nathalie Marinovitch (BOL)	1	4
Yleymi Muelle (PER)	6	6

=== Boys' doubles ===
Quarter-finals
6 April, 15:00 – Central Court
JD Segovia – JA Listo (VEN)	6	7^{9}
D Muñoz – S Lora (BOL)	3	6^{7}
6 April, 13:15 – Court 1
F Durán – M Riveros (CHI)	6	3	10
C Valdés Jr – G Rodríguez (PAN)	1	6	12

Semi-finals
7 April, 13:00 – Court 2
J Trujillo – S Heredia (COL)	7	6
JD Segovia – JA Listo (VEN)	6	3
7 April, 13:40 – Court 1
C Valdés Jr – G Rodríguez (PAN)	6	1
LJ Nakamine – V Monge (PER)	7	6

Gold medal match
8 April, 16:00 – Court 1
J Trujillo – S Heredia (COL)	(w/o)
LJ Nakamine – V Monge (PER)	–
Bronze medal match
8 April, 15:30 – Court 3
JD Segovia – JA Listo (VEN)	6	6
C Valdés Jr – G Rodríguez (PAN)	1	1

=== Girls' doubles ===
Quarter-finals
6 April, 16:15 – Court 1
G. Pimentel – Y Muelle (PER)	7	6^{9}	3
C Alarcón – J Fuenzalida (CHI)	5	7^{11}	10

Semi-finals
7 April, 14:30 – Court 2
M Higuita – V Mediorreal (COL)	6	6
C Alarcón – J Fuenzalida (CHI)	2	0
7 April, 15:45 – Court 1
A Bjornestad – K Ching (PAN)	0	2
N Trigosso – N Marinovitch (BOL)	6	6

Gold medal match
8 April, 16:15 – Central Court
M Higuita – V Mediorreal (COL)	6	6
N Trigosso – N Marinovitch (BOL)	1	1
Bronze medal match
8 April, 16:00 – Court 1
C Alarcón – J Fuenzalida (CHI)	7^{7}	6
A Bjornestad – K Ching (PAN)	6^{3}	0

=== Mixed doubles ===
Quarter-finals
6 April, 19:00 – Court 1
A Magallanes – JA Listo (VEN)	6	6
V Monge – Y Muelle (PER)	4	2
6 April, 19:15 – Central Court
F Durán – J Fuenzalida (CHI)	6	6
A Bjornestad – G Rodríguez (PAN)	3	4
6 April, 17:30 – Central Court
B Olvera – M Larrea (ECU)	6	3
D Muñoz – N Trigosso (BOL)	7	6

Semi-finals
8 April, 13:00 – Court 1
S Heredia – V Mediorreal (COL)	6	6
A Magallanes – JA Listo (VEN)	3	4
8 April, 14:00 – Central Court
F Durán – J Fuenzalida (CHI)	6^{3}	3
D Muñoz – N Trigosso (BOL)	7^{7}	6

Gold medal match
9 April, 14:15 – Central Court
S Heredia – V Mediorreal (COL)	7	7
D Muñoz – N Trigosso (BOL)	5	5
Bronze medal match
9 April, 14:15 – Court 1
A Magallanes – JA Listo (VEN)	7	6
F Durán – J Fuenzalida (CHI)	5	4
