= Camila Osorio =

Colombian tennis player (born 2001)

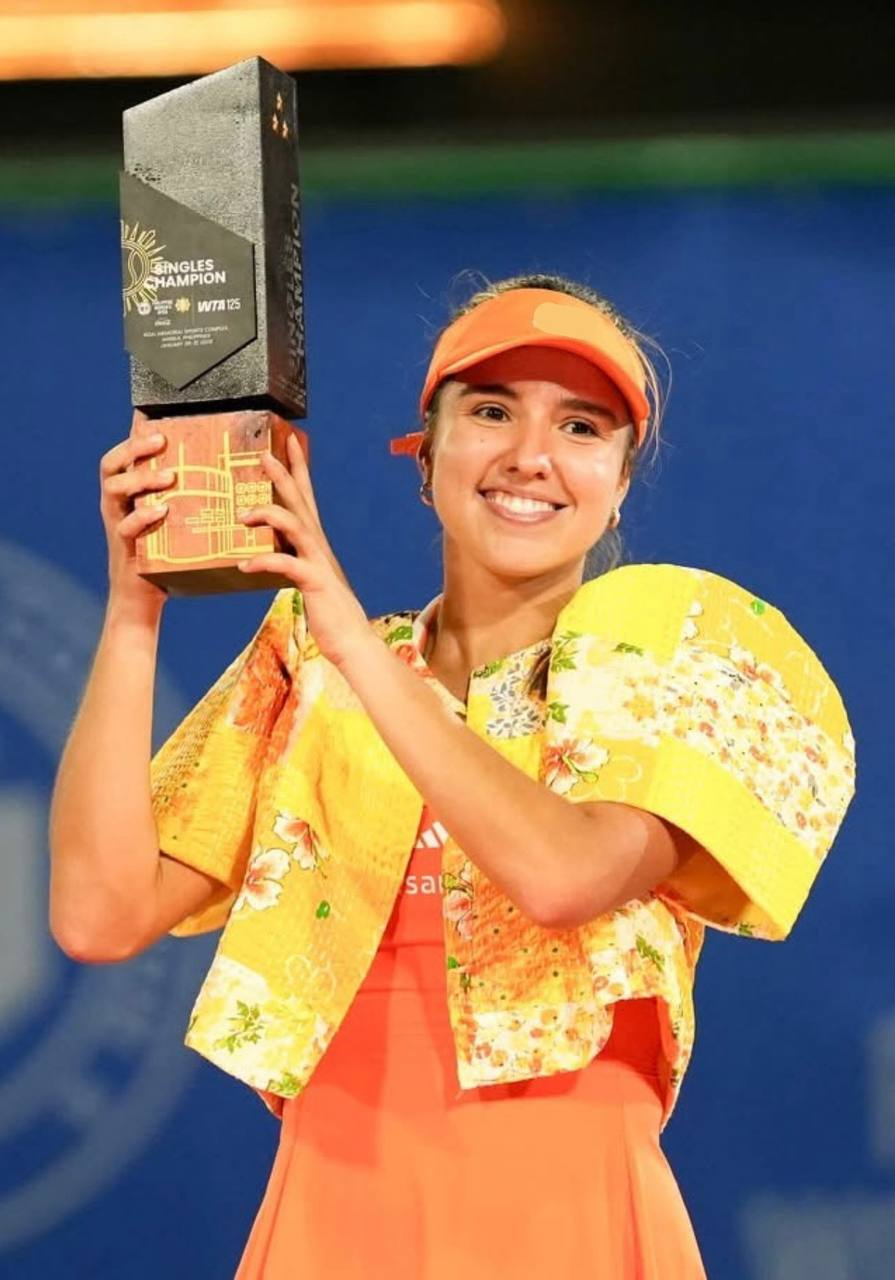
- Osorio at the 2026 Philippine Open
- Full name: María Camila Osorio Serrano
- Country (sports): Colombia
- Residence: Cúcuta, Colombia
- Born: 22 December 2001 (age 24) Cúcuta
- Height: 1.70 m (5 ft 7 in)
- Turned pro: 2021
- Plays: Right (two-handed backhand)
- Coach: Ricardo Sánchez
- Prize money: US$ 3,770,863

Singles
- Career record: 241–153
- Career titles: 3
- Highest ranking: No. 33 (4 April 2022)
- Current ranking: No. 60 (3 August 2026)

Grand Slam singles results
- Australian Open: 2R (2023, 2025)
- French Open: 3R (2026)
- Wimbledon: 3R (2021)
- US Open: 2R (2021, 2022)

Other tournaments
- Olympic Games: 3R (2024)

Doubles
- Career record: 36–54
- Career titles: 0
- Highest ranking: No. 162 (8 September 2025)
- Current ranking: No. 212 (15 June 2026)

Grand Slam doubles results
- Australian Open: 2R (2023)
- French Open: 2R (2022, 2024)
- Wimbledon: 2R (2022, 2025, 2026)
- US Open: 3R (2025)

Grand Slam mixed doubles results
- Australian Open: 1R (2022)

Team competitions
- BJK Cup: 17–8
Medal record
Representing Colombia
Women's tennis
Event	1st	2nd	3rd
Youth Olympic Games	0	1	1
CAC Games	1	1	0
Bolivarian Games	0	1	0
South American Youth Games	2	1	0
Total	3	4	1
Central American and Caribbean Games
Gold medal – first place	2018 Barranquilla	Team
Silver medal – second place	2018 Barranquilla	Doubles
Bolivarian Games
Silver medal – second place	2017 Santa Marta	Team
Youth Olympic Games
Silver medal – second place	2018 Buenos Aires	Mixed doubles
Bronze medal – third place	2018 Buenos Aires	Singles
South American Youth Games
Gold medal – first place	2017 Santiago	Singles
Gold medal – first place	2017 Santiago	Mixed doubles
Silver medal – second place	2017 Santiago	Doubles
- Last updated on: 25 June 2026.

María Camila Osorio Serrano (Spanish pronunciation: [maɾja kaˈmila oˈsoɾjo seˈrano]; (Note: In isolation, María is pronounced [maˈɾi.a].) born 22 December 2001) is a Colombian professional tennis player. She has a career-high singles ranking of No. 33 by the WTA, achieved on 4 April 2022, and a best doubles ranking of No. 162, achieved on 8 September 2025. She is currently the No. 1 singles player from Colombia.

Osorio has won three singles titles on the WTA Tour, as well as one on WTA 125 tournaments.

== Career ==
=== 2017-2019: Junior major champion and world No. 1 ===
She won the girls' singles title at the 2019 US Open. In the final, she defeated Alexandra Yepifanova losing only one game. On the ITF Junior Circuit, Osorio advanced to the world No. 1 in September 2019.

Singles:

- Australian Open: –
- French Open: SF (2019)
- Wimbledon: 3R (2017)
- US Open: W (2019)

Doubles:

- Australian Open: –
- French Open: QF (2017)
- Wimbledon: 2R (2017, 2019)
- US Open: QF (2018)

At the 2018 Summer Youth Olympics, she won the bronze medal in girls' singles and a silver medal in mixed doubles, alongside Nicolás Mejía.

=== 2021: Maiden WTA Tour title & top 100, WTA 1000 & major debuts ===
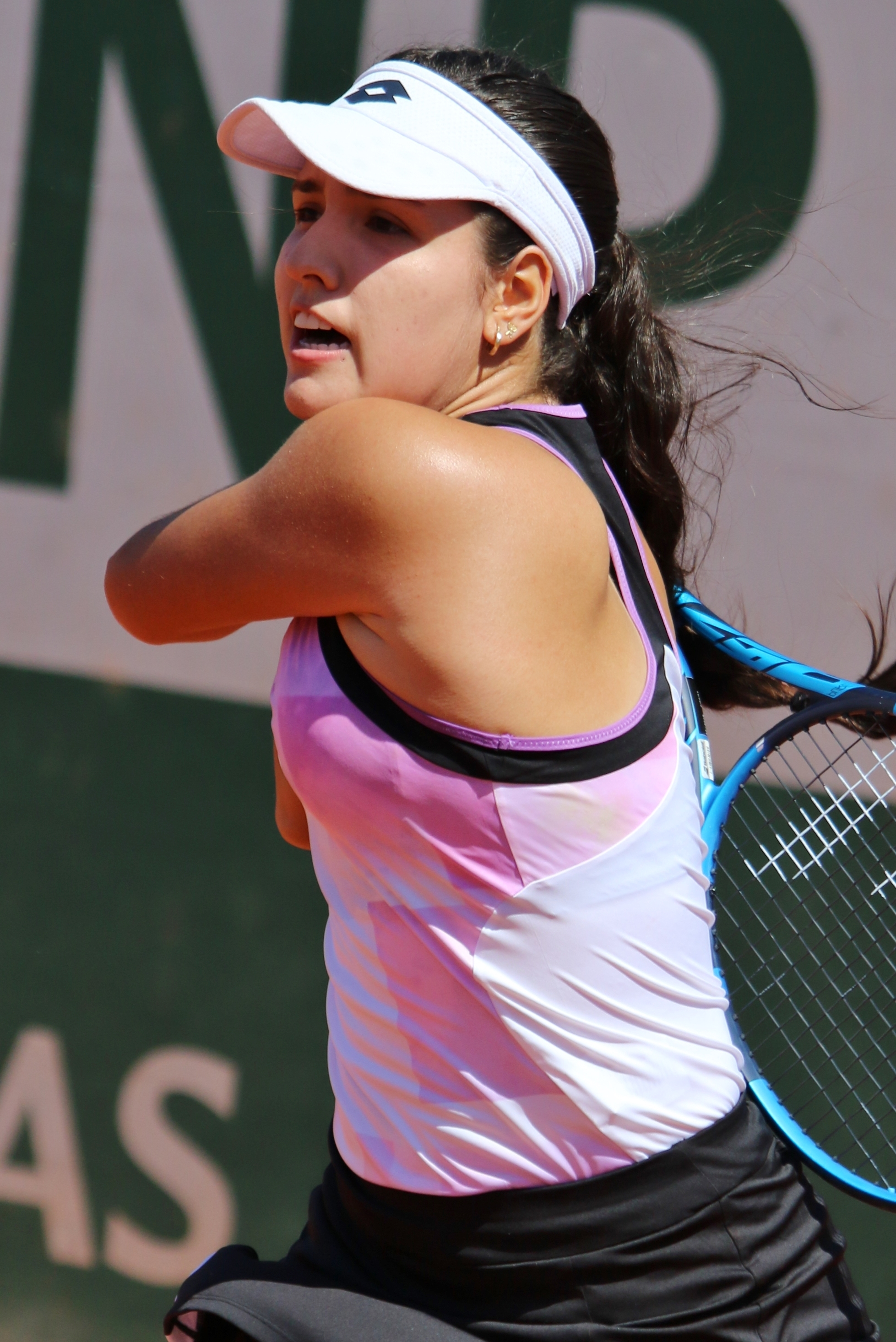
Osorio at the 2021 French Open

Osorio made her WTA 1000 debut at the Indian Wells Open. In April 2021, while ranked world No. 180, Osorio won her first singles title at the Copa Colsanitas in her native Colombia, defeating Tamara Zidanšek in the final. She followed up with a semifinal appearance at the Charleston Open the following week.

In May, she reached her third straight clay-court semifinal at the Serbia Open, entering the top 100 as a result. She came through the qualifying at the French Open to make her Major debut. However, she lost in the first round to Madison Brengle.

In June, she again qualified for the main draw at the Wimbledon Championships. She reached the third round by defeating fellow-qualifier Anna Kalinskaya and 32nd seed Ekaterina Alexandrova before losing to second seed Aryna Sabalenka.

Osorio started at the US Open defeating Ivana Jorović in the first round of the tournament, before losing to Ons Jabeur in the second. Osorio completed her first professional season by reaching the final of the Tenerife Open, where she eventually lost to Ann Li. She later revealed in an interview that she sustained an abdominal injury which affected her in the final round of the tournament. Her success at the tournament saw her reach a new career high of No. 53 on 25 October 2021, finishing the season ranked No. 55.

=== 2022: Australian debut, first major & WTA 1000 wins, top 35 ===
Osorio gained direct acceptance at the Monterrey Open. She reached her third Tour-level singles final, losing to second seed and 2021 US Open runner-up, Leylah Fernandez, after having multiple match points.

She reached a career-high ranking of No. 33 on 4 April 2022.

=== 2023: First Australian Open & top 5 wins, WTA 1000 fourth round ===
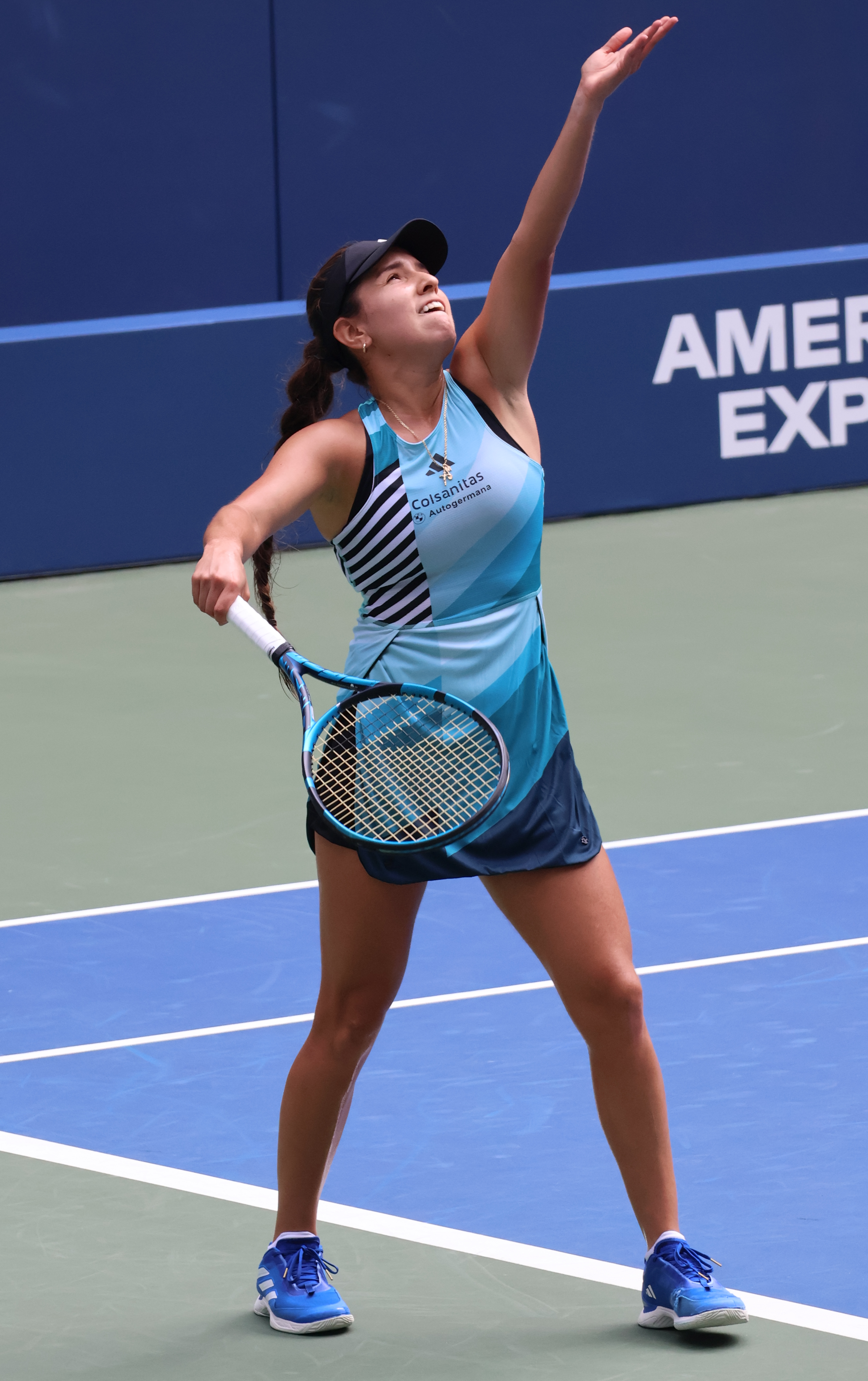
Osorio at the 2023 US Open

Osorio won her first match at the Australian Open defeating Panna Udvardy.

She gained direct acceptance at the Lyon Open where she reached her first semifinal of the season defeating local and third seed of the tournament, Alizé Cornet, in the first round, Jule Niemeier in the second and Linda Nosková in the quarterfinals. She lost her semifinal match to top seed Caroline Garcia, in straight sets.

Ranked No. 70 at the Monterrey Open, Osorio retired in the first round in the second set against Mayar Sherif. As a result of not being able to defend her points from the previous year final, she fell 30 positions down to top 100 on 6 March 2023.

Ranked No. 115, she received a wildcard for the main draw of the Madrid Open. She reached the third round of a WTA 1000 for the first time in her career, defeating Clara Burel and 32nd seed Marta Kostyuk. She qualified for the next WTA 1000, the Italian Open, and won her first-round match against Varvara Gracheva, after saving three match points. Next, she defeated 29th seed Petra Martić to reach back to back third rounds at a WTA 1000 level. She reached her first fourth round at a WTA 1000 level with a Top 5 win over Caroline Garcia, avenging her semifinal loss in Lyon and becoming the first Colombian woman to reach the round of 16 at a WTA 1000 tournament. As a result, she returned to the top 85 on 22 May 2023. As the top qualifying seed, she entered the French Open as a lucky loser, and defeated Ana Bogdan in the first round.

=== 2024: Second title at home, WTA 500 semifinal ===
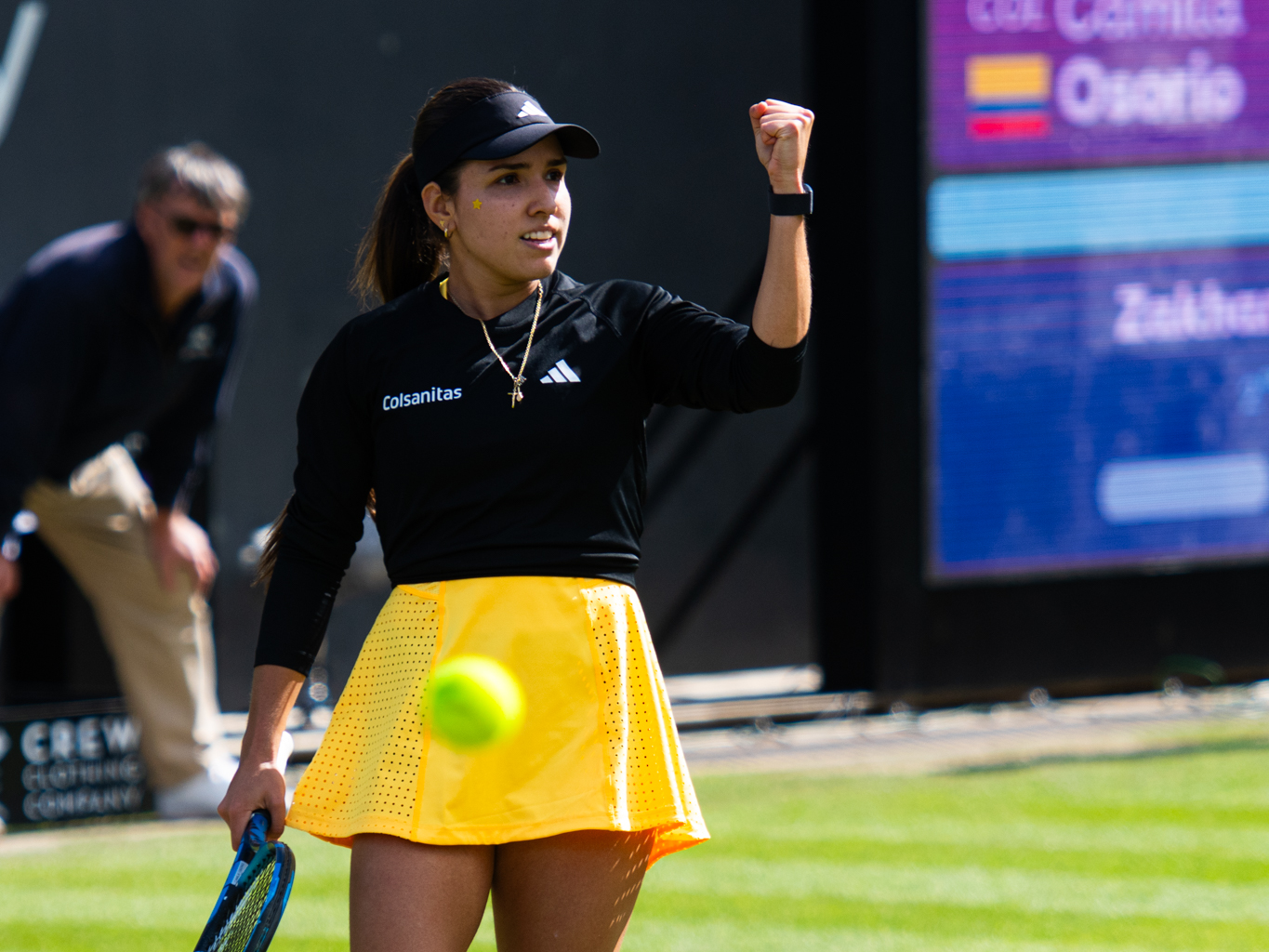
Osorio at the 2024 Birmingham Classic

At her home tournament, the Copa Colsanitas in Bogotá, Colombia, Osorio reached the semifinals for the third time, defeating qualifiers Marina Stakusic and Anca Todoni and then second seed and defending champion Tatjana Maria. She reached her second final at the tournament defeating Sara Errani. She lifted her second title at the tournament defeating top seed Marie Bouzková in straight sets. As a result, she returned to the top 65 in the rankings.

At the WTA 500 Guadalajara Open, she defeated Hailey Baptiste and seventh seed Veronika Kudermetova in three sets, coming from 0-5 games in the third set and reeling off seven games in a row to win the match and reach the quarterfinals. Next she defeated Kamilla Rakhimova in straight sets to reach her first semifinal at the WTA 500-level, becoming the first Colombian to accomplish the feat. She lost in the last four to Olivia Gadecki.

=== 2025: Singapore quarterfinal, third Bogota title ===
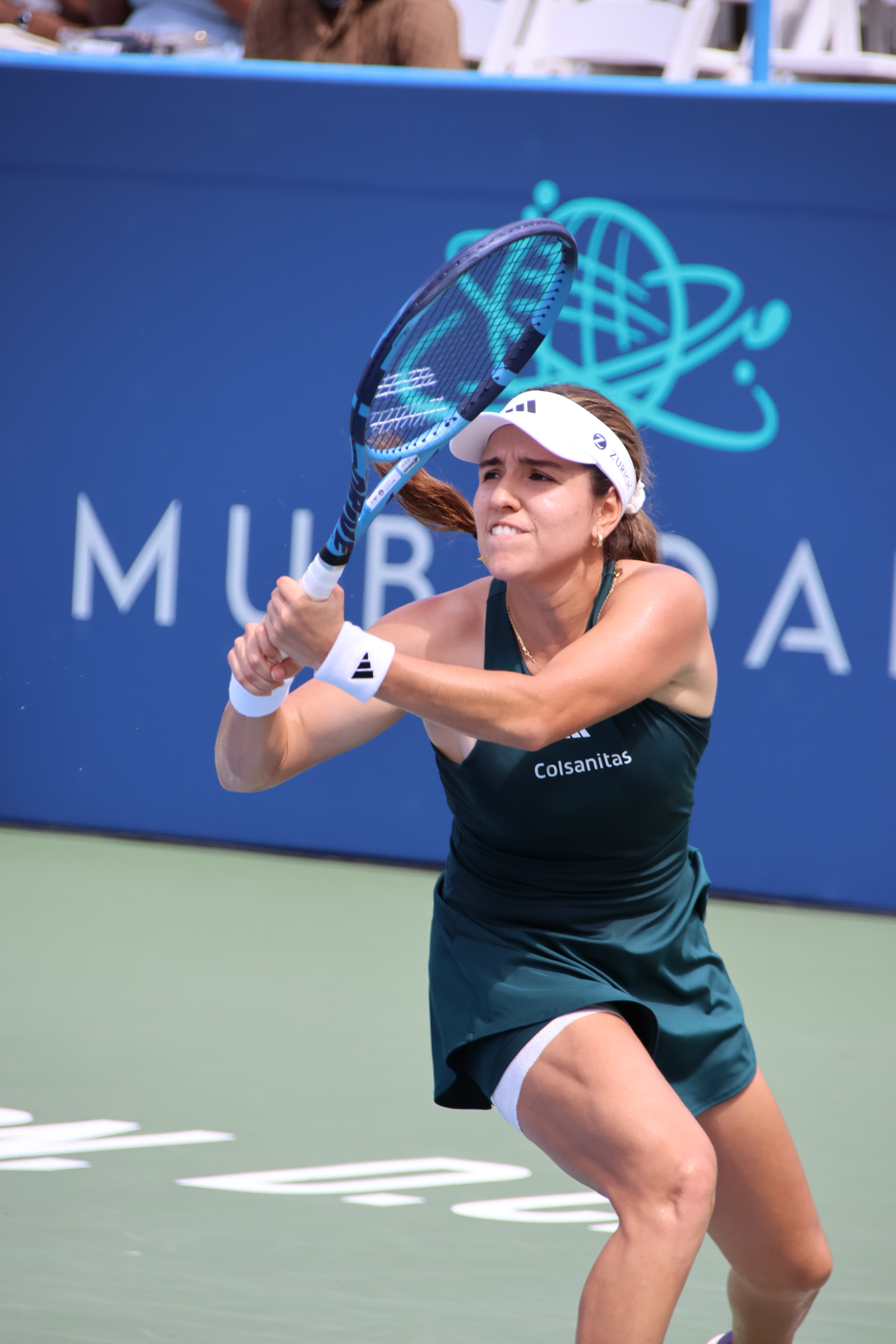
Osorio at the 2025 Washington Open

Seeded sixth at the Singapore Open, Osorio defeated Bernarda Pera and qualifier Dominika Šalková to reach the quarterfinals, where she lost to second seed Elise Mertens.

Osorio recorded her first tournament win in Indian Wells on her third appearance, defeating former champion Naomi Osaka.

At her home tournament in Bogotá she reached back-to-back finals defeating Emina Bektas, sixth seed Tatjana Maria again, and Julia Riera. She defended her title defeating Katarzyna Kawa. It was her third title at the tournament becoming the second player after Fabiola Zuluaga to win three or more titles in Bogota.

=== 2026: WTA 125 title, French Open third round ===
At the inaugural WTA 125 Philippine Women's Open, fifth seed Osorio progressed to the final with victories over second seed Alexandra Eala in the quarterfinals and third seed Solana Sierra in the semifinals. She claimed the tournament’s inaugural title by defeating fourth seed Donna Vekić in a three-set final.

At the Miami Open, she recorded her first win at the tournament over Kateřina Siniaková. At the 2026 French Open, Osorio reached the third round for the first time in her career, recording an upset win over 14th seed Ekaterina Alexandrova in straight sets, before winning in 3 hours and 30 minutes against Yulia Putintseva, the longest tour-level match win of her career.

== Personal life ==
Osorio is the granddaughter of Colombian national team football player Rolando Serrano.

== Performance timelines ==
Key
W	F	SF	QF	#R	RR	Q#	P#	DNQ	A	Z#	PO	G	S	B	NMS	NTI	P	NH

(W) winner; (F) finalist; (SF) semifinalist; (QF) quarterfinalist; (#R) rounds 4, 3, 2, 1; (RR) round-robin stage; (Q#) qualification round; (P#) preliminary round; (DNQ) did not qualify; (A) absent; (Z#) Davis/Fed Cup Zonal Group (with number indication) or (PO) play-off; (G) gold, (S) silver or (B) bronze Olympic/Paralympic medal; (NMS) not a Masters tournament; (NTI) not a Tier I tournament; (P) postponed; (NH) not held; (SR) strike rate (events won / competed); (W–L) win–loss record.
To avoid confusion and double counting, these charts are updated at the conclusion of a tournament or when the player's participation has ended.

Only main-draw results in WTA Tour, Grand Slam tournaments, Fed Cup/Billie Jean King Cup and Olympic Games are included in win–loss records.

=== Singles ===
Current through the 2026 French Open.

Tournament	2016	2017	2018	2019	2020	2021	2022	2023	2024	2025	2026	SR	W–L	Win %
Grand Slam tournaments
Australian Open	A	A	A	A	Q2	Q3	1R	2R	1R	2R	1R	0 / 5	2–5	29%
French Open	A	A	A	A	Q1	1R	2R	2R	2R	1R	3R	0 / 6	5–6	45%
Wimbledon	A	A	A	A	NH	3R	1R	1R	2R	1R	2R	0 / 6	4–6	40%
US Open	A	A	A	A	A	2R	2R	1R	1R	1R	1R	0 / 6	2–6	25%
Win–loss	0–0	0–0	0–0	0–0	0–0	3–3	2–4	2–4	2–4	1–4	3–4	0 / 23	13–23	36%
National representation
Summer Olympics	A	NH				1R	NH		3R	NH		0 / 2	2–2	50%
Billie Jean King Cup (Note: Formerly known as Fed Cup until 2020.)	Z1	Z1	A	Z1	POZ1 (Note: Edition is split into the two years due to COVID-19.)		A	PO	PO	A		0 / 0	13–4	76%
WTA 1000 tournaments
Qatar Open	A	NTI	A	NTI	A	NTI	A	NTI	A	A	3R	0 / 1	2–1	67%
Dubai Championships	NTI	A	NTI	A	NTI	A	NTI	A	A	A	A	0 / 0	0–0	–
Indian Wells Open	A	A	A	A	NH	1R	1R	A	Q2	2R	3R	0 / 4	3–4	43%
Miami Open	A	A	A	A	NH	A	A	A	Q2	1R	2R	0 / 2	1–2	33%
Madrid Open	A	A	A	A	NH	A	A	3R	Q1	2R	2R	0 / 3	4–3	57%
Italian Open	A	A	A	A	A	A	2R	4R	2R	1R	Q1	0 / 4	5–4	56%
Canadian Open	A	A	A	A	NH	A	A	A	A	2R	2R	0 / 2	2–2	50%
Cincinnati Open	A	A	A	A	A	Q1	Q1	Q2	A	2R	1R	0 / 2	1–2	33%
China Open	A	A	A	A	NH				2R	3R		0 / 2	2–2	50%
Wuhan Open	A	A	A	A	NH				1R	1R		0 / 2	0–2	0%
Guadalajara Open	NH						2R	1R	NH			0 / 2	1–2	33%
Win–loss	0–0	0–0	0–0	0–0	0–0	0–1	2–3	5–3	2–3	6–8	7–6	0 / 22	22–24	48%
Career statistics
	2016	2017	2018	2019	2020	2021	2022	2023	2024	2025	2025	SR	W–L	Win %
Tournaments	0 (Note: During the season, she did not play in the main draw of any tour-level tournaments. However, she played at the Billie Jean King Cup, which is not counted as a played tournament but matches counted.)	0	1	1	0	13	16	15	15	20	7	Career total: 88		
Titles	0	0	0	0	0	1	0	0	1	1		Career total: 2		
Finals	0	0	0	0	0	2	1	0	1	1		Career total: 4		
Hard win–loss	0–0	6–4	6–2	9–3	7–7	14-12	15–12	10–11	13–12	13–15		0 / 78	93–78	54%
Clay win–loss	4–4	7–3	12–4	34–11	6–6	16–3	5–3	15–7	17–7	9–5		0 / 53	125–53	70%
Grass win–loss	0–0	0–0	0–0	0–0	0–0	5–2	0–4	3–2	4–3	0–2		0 / 13	12–13	48%
Overall win–loss	4–4	13–7	18–6	43–14	13–13	35–17	20–19	30–20	34–22	22–22		0 / 59	232–144	62%
Win %	50%	65%	75%	75%	50%	67%	51%	60%	61%	50%		Career total: 61.7%		
Year–end ranking	1249	1026	723	186	186	55	82	79	63	82		$3,450,301		

=== Doubles ===
Tournament	2021	2022	2023	2024	2025	2026	SR	W–L	Win%
Grand Slam tournaments
Australian Open	A	1R	2R	1R	A	1R	0 / 4	1–4	20%
French Open	A	2R	A	2R	1R	1R	0 / 4	2–4	33%
Wimbledon	A	2R	A	A	2R	2R	0 / 3	3–3	50%
US Open	1R	1R	1R	2R	3R	1R	0 / 6	3–6	33%
WTA 1000 tournaments
Guadalajara Open	NH	1R	A	NH			0 / 1	0–1	0%
Win–loss	0–1	2–5	1–2	2–3	3–3	0–4	0 / 18	9–18	33%

== WTA Tour finals ==
=== Singles: 5 (3 titles, 2 runner-ups) ===
Legend WTA 250 (3–2)	Finals by surface Hard (0–2) Clay (3–0)	Finals by setting Outdoor (3–2)

Result	W–L	Date	Tournament	Tier	Surface	Opponent	Score
Win	1–0	Apr 2021	Copa Colsanitas, Colombia	WTA 250	Clay	(Slovenia) Tamara Zidanšek	5–7, 6–3, 6–4
Loss	1–1	Oct 2021	Tenerife Ladies Open, Spain	WTA 250	Hard	(United States) Ann Li	1–6, 4–6
Loss	1–2	Mar 2022	Monterrey Open, Mexico	WTA 250	Hard	(Canada) Leylah Fernandez	7–6^{(7–5)}, 4–6, 6–7^{(3–7)}
Win	2–2	Apr 2024	Copa Colsanitas, Colombia (2)	WTA 250	Clay	(Czech Republic) Marie Bouzková	6–3, 7–6^{(7–5)}
Win	3–2	Apr 2025	Copa Colsanitas, Colombia (3)	WTA 250	Clay	(Poland) Katarzyna Kawa	6–3, 6–3

== WTA 125 finals ==
=== Singles: 1 (title) ===
Result	Date	Tournament	Surface	Opponent	Score
Win	Jan 2026	Philippine Women's Open, Philippines	Hard	(Croatia) Donna Vekić	2–6, 6–3, 7–5

== ITF Circuit finals ==
=== Singles: 6 (3 titles, 3 runner-ups) ===
Legend $25,000 tournaments (2–1) $15,000 tournaments (1–2)	Finals by surface Hard (0–3) Clay (3–0)

Result	W–L	Date	Tournament	Tier	Surface	Opponent	Score
Win	1–0	Nov 2018	ITF Cúcuta, Colombia	15,000	Clay	(Colombia) Yuliana Lizarazo	6–3, 7–6^{(2)}
Loss	1–1	Nov 2018	ITF Norman, US	25,000	Hard	(Canada) Bianca Andreescu	1–6, 0–6
Loss	1–2	Mar 2019	ITF Cancún, Mexico	15,000	Hard	(France) Lou Brouleau	6–3, 4–6, 1–5 ret.
Loss	1–3	Mar 2019	ITF Cancún, Mexico	15,000	Hard	(New Zealand) Paige Hourigan	4–6, 3–6
Win	2–3	Aug 2019	ITF Guayaquil, Ecuador	25,000	Clay	(United States) Katerina Stewart	7–5, 7–6^{(3)}
Win	3–3	Aug 2019	ITF Guayaquil, Ecuador	25,000	Clay	(United States) Katerina Stewart	7–5, 6–3

=== Doubles: 3 (3 runner-ups) ===
Legend $60,000 tournaments $25,000 tournaments (0–3)	Finals by surface Hard (0–2) Clay (0–1)

Result	W–L	Date	Tournament	Tier	Surface	Partner	Opponents	Score
Loss	0–1	Aug 2019	ITF Guayaquil, Ecuador	25,000	Clay	(Colombia) Yuliana Lizarazo	(United States) Katerina Stewart (Romania) Gabriela Lee	7–6^{(1)}, 6–7^{(6)}, [7–10]
Loss	0–2	Feb 2021	ITF Orlando, US	25,000	Hard	(Switzerland) Conny Perrin	(United States) Emina Bektas (United Kingdom) Tara Moore	5–7, 6–2, [5–10]
Loss	0–3	Feb 2021	ITF Boca Raton, US	25,000	Hard	(Switzerland) Conny Perrin	(United States) Usue Maitane Arconada (United States) Caroline Dolehide	3–6, 4–6

== ITF Junior Circuit ==
=== Grand Slam tournament finals ===
==== Singles: 1 (title) ====
Result	Year	Tournament	Surface	Opponent	Score
Win	2019	US Open	Hard	(United States) Alexandra Yepifanova	6–1, 6–0

=== Junior Circuit finals ===
==== Singles: 10 (7 titles, 3 runner-ups) ====
Legend
Grade 1 / B1 (6–1)
Grade 3 (0–1)
Grade 4 (1–1)

Result	W–L	Date	Tournament	Grade	Surface	Opponent	Score
Loss	0–1	Mar 2016	San José, Costa Rica	Grade 3	Hard	(United States) Dalayna Hewitt	6–4, 3–6, 1–6
Loss	0–2	Jun 2016	Kelibia, Tunisia	Grade 4	Hard	(Spain) Dalila Said	6–7^{(5)}, 3–6
Win	1–2	Jun 2016	Mahdia, Tunisia	Grade 4	Hard	(France) Marie-Amélie Dardaine	6–1, 6–2
Win	2–2	Jan 2017	Barranquilla, Colombia	Grade 1	Clay	(Israel) Shelly Krolitzky	6–0, 7–6^{(3)}
Loss	2–3	Feb 2017	Mar del Plata, Argentina	Grade B1	Clay	(Colombia) Emiliana Arango	2–6, 6–7^{(6)}
Win	3–3	Jan 2018	San José, Costa Rica	Grade 1	Hard	(United States) Lea Ma	6–3, 5–7, 6–3
Win	4–3	Jan 2018	Barranquilla, Colombia	Grade 1	Clay	(United States) Lea Ma	6–2, 6–2
Win	5–3	Feb 2018	Lambaré, Paraguay	Grade 1	Clay	(Argentina) Ana Geller	6–3, 6–1
Win	6–3	Feb 2018	Criciúma, Brazil	Grade 1	Clay	(United States) Alexa Noel	6–3, 6–4
Win	7–3	Mar 2018	São Paulo, Brazil	Grade B1	Clay	(Argentina) María Lourdes Carlé	3–6, 6–3, 6–3

==== Doubles: 4 (3 titles, 1 runner-up) ====
Legend
Category B1 (2–0)
Category G2 (1–0)
Category G4 (0–1)

Result	W–L	Date	Tournament	Grade	Surface	Partner	Opponents	Score
Loss	0–1	Jun 2016	Mahdia, Tunisia	Grade 4	Hard	(Spain) Pilar Astigarraga Harper	(Poland) Weronika Falkowska (Poland) Wiktoria Rutkowska	3–6, 4–6
Win	1–1	Sep 2016	Montevideo, Uruguay	Grade 2	Clay	(Brazil) Thaisa Pedretti	(Argentina) Paula Barañano (Chile) Fernanda Labraña	6–4, 6–4
Win	2–1	Feb 2017	Mar del Plata, Argentina	Grade B1	Clay	(Brazil) Thaisa Pedretti	(Colombia) Emiliana Arango (Colombia) Sofía Múnera Sánchez	6–4, 3–6, [14–12]
Win	3–1	Mar 2018	São Paulo, Brazil	Grade B1	Clay	(Argentina) María Lourdes Carlé	(Argentina) Ana Geller (Argentina) Maia Guillermina Haumuller	6–3, 6–2

== Wins against top 10 players ==
- Osorio Serrano's record against players who have been ranked in the top 10.

Season	2021	2022	2023	2024	2025	Total
Wins	1	0	1	0	0	2

No.	Player	Rk	Event	Surface	Rd	Score	Rk	Years	Ref
1.	(Ukraine) Elina Svitolina	6	Tenerife Open, Spain	Hard	1R	5–7, 6–3, 6–2	63	2021	
2.	(France) Caroline Garcia	4	Italian Open, Italy	Clay	3R	6–4, 6–4	100	2023	

- Key: (Rk) first use, opponent rank; (Rd) round; (Rk) 2nd use, player rank; (Ref) reference; (F) final; (SF) semifinal; (QF) quarterfinal; (#R) rounds 4, 3, 2, 1; (RR) round-robin stage; (Q#) qualifying rounds or stages (3), 2, 1.

*As of 13 May 2023

== Regional championship medal matches ==
=== Summer Youth Olympics ===
==== Singles: 1 (bronze medal) ====
Result	Year	Host location	Surface	Opponent	Score
Bronze	2018	Buenos Aires, Argentina	Clay	(China) Wang Xinyu	7–6^{(4)}, 6–0

==== Mixed doubles: 1 (silver medal) ====
Result	Year	Host location	Surface	Partner	Opponents	Score
Silver	2018	Buenos Aires, Argentina	Clay	(Colombia) Nicolás Mejía	(Japan) Yuki Naito (Japan) Naoki Tajima	2–6, 3–6
