= 2026 ITF Men's World Tennis Tour =

Entry-level tennis series

2026 Men's World Tennis Tour
Details
- Duration: January – December 2026
- Edition: 29th
- Categories: M25 tournaments M15 tournaments

Achievements (singles)

The 2026 ITF Men's World Tennis Tour is an entry-level tour for men's professional tennis. It is organized by World Tennis (formerly known as the International Tennis Federation or ITF) and is a tier below the ATP Challenger Tour. The men's tour includes tournaments with prize money of either US$15,000 (M15) or $30,000 (M25). The results of World Tennis (previously ITF) tournaments are incorporated into the ATP ranking, which enables professionals to progress to the ATP Challenger Tour and ATP Tour, and ultimately the Grand Slams. World Tennis offers approximately 550 tournaments across 70 countries.

On 25 June 2026, the ITF rebranded as World Tennis; due to logistical challenges, events on the newly renamed Men's World Tennis Tour may continue to use the former ITF branding until 1 January 2027.

== Participating host nations ==
- Angola (ANG)
- Argentina (ARG)
- Armenia (ARM)
- Australia (AUS)
- Austria (AUT)
- Azerbaijan (AZE)
- Belgium (BEL)
- Bermuda (BER)
- Bolivia (BOL)
- Bosnia and Herzegovina (BIH)
- Botswana (BOT)
- Brazil (BRA)
- Bulgaria (BUL)
- Canada (CAN)
- Chile (CHI)
- China (CHN)
- Chinese Taipei (TPE)
- Costa Rica (CRC)
- Croatia (CRO)
- Czech Republic (CZE)
- Denmark (DEN)
- Dominican Republic (DOM)
- Ecuador (ECU)
- Egypt (EGY)
- Finland (FIN)
- France (FRA)
- Georgia (GEO)
- Germany (GER)
- Great Britain (GBR)
- Greece (GRE)
- Guam (GUM)
- Hungary (HUN)
- India (IND)
- Indonesia (INA)
- Ireland (IRE)
- Italy (ITA)
- Japan (JPN)
- Kazakhstan (KAZ)
- Kuwait (KWT)
- Malaysia (MAS)
- Malta (MLT)
- Mexico (MEX)
- Morocco (MAR)
- Netherlands (NED)
- New Zealand (NZL)
- Nigeria (NGR)
- North Macedonia (MKD)
- Norway (NOR)
- Pakistan (PAK)
- Paraguay (PAR)
- Peru (PER)
- Poland (POL)
- Portugal (POR)
- Romania (ROU)
- Rwanda (RWA)
- Serbia (SRB)
- Singapore (SGP)
- Slovakia (SVK)
- Slovenia (SLO)
- South Africa (RSA)
- South Korea (KOR)
- Spain (ESP)
- Sweden (SWE)
- Switzerland (SUI)
- Thailand (THA)
- Tunisia (TUN)
- Turkey (TUR)
- United Arab Emirates (UAE)
- United States (USA)
- Uruguay (URU)
- Uzbekistan (UZB)

== Statistics ==
These tables present the number of singles (S) and doubles (D) titles won by each player and each nation during the season. The players/nations are sorted by:

1. Total number of titles (a doubles title won by two players representing the same nation counts as only one win for the nation)
2. A singles > doubles hierarchy
3. Alphabetical order (by family names for players).

To avoid confusion and double counting, these tables should be updated only after all events of the week are completed.

=== Titles won by nation ===
Updated as of 9 November

Total	Nation	M25		M15		Total	
Total	Nation	S	D	S	D	S	D
123	United States (USA)	15	32	26	50	41	82
94	Italy (ITA)	8	22	25	39	33	61
86	France (FRA)	24	14	26	22	50	36
80	Germany (GER)	16	19	20	25	36	44
74	Great Britain (GBR)	15	23	13	23	28	46
55	Australia (AUS)	12	11	18	14	30	25
54	Spain (ESP)	11	11	12	20	23	31
42	Netherlands (NED)	8	9	10	15	18	24
37	Argentina (ARG)	4	6	8	19	12	25
36	Japan (JPN)	3	7	8	18	11	25
32	Romania (ROU)	7	4	15	6	22	10
31	Brazil (BRA)	2	5	12	12	14	17
28	Switzerland (SUI)	10	6	4	8	14	14
24	Ukraine (UKR)	8	3	7	6	15	9
24	Czech Republic (CZE)	2	6	5	11	7	17
24	India (IND)	1	6	8	9	9	15
24	Sweden (SWE)		4	7	13	7	17
23	New Zealand (NZL)	1	9	4	9	5	18
22	Turkey (TUR)	2	1	8	11	10	12
21	Serbia (SRB)		3	10	8	10	11
20	China (CHN)		3	5	12	5	15
19	Poland (POL)	3	4	5	7	8	11
17	Denmark (DEN)	3	5	2	7	5	12
16	South Korea (KOR)	2	2	3	9	5	11
15	Belgium (BEL)	6	4	4	1	10	5
15	Tunisia (TUN)		2	6	7	6	9
13	Canada (CAN)	1	6	1	5	2	11
13	Croatia (CRO)	1	2	3	7	4	9
12	Portugal (POR)	2	7	2	1	4	8
12	South Africa (RSA)	1	2	4	5	5	7
11	Bulgaria (BUL)	5	2	3	1	8	3
11	Slovakia (SVK)	1	4	3	3	4	7
11	Finland (FIN)		4	3	4	3	8
11	Ireland (IRE)		4	2	5	2	9
11	Hungary (HUN)		2	3	6	3	8
10	Morocco (MAR)	3	4	2	1	5	5
10	Chinese Taipei (TPE)	3	1		6	3	7
10	Thailand (THA)			3	7	3	7
9	Mexico (MEX)	1	3	2	3	3	6
9	Norway (NOR)		2	2	5	2	7
8	Slovenia (SLO)	4	2	2		6	2
8	Greece (GRE)		4	2	2	2	6
8	Kazakhstan (KAZ)			4	4	4	4
7	Latvia (LAT)	1	1	3	2	4	3
7	Uzbekistan (UZB)	1	1	2	3	3	4
7	Colombia (COL)		1	2	4	2	5
6	Austria (AUT)	4	2			4	2
6	Egypt (EGY)	1	1	2	2	3	3
6	Bosnia and Herzegovina (BIH)		2		4	0	6
6	Uruguay (URU)			4	2	4	2
6	Estonia (EST)			1	5	1	5
4	Cyprus (CYP)	1	2	1		2	2
4	Indonesia (INA)			3	1	3	1
4	Algeria (ALG)				4	0	4
3	Dominican Republic (DOM)	2		1		3	0
3	Ivory Coast (CIV)	2		1		3	0
3	North Macedonia (MKD)	1	1		1	1	2
3	Israel (ISR)	1		2		3	0
3	Jamaica (JAM)	1		2		3	0
3	Northern Mariana Islands (NMI)	1		1	1	2	1
3	Zimbabwe (ZIM)		2		1	0	3
3	Bolivia (BOL)		1	1	1	1	2
3	Costa Rica (CRC)		1	1	1	1	2
3	Armenia (ARM)				3	0	3
3	Monaco (MON)				3	0	3
2	Chile (CHI)		1		1	0	2
2	Kuwait (KUW)		1		1	0	2
2	Luxembourg (LUX)		1		1	0	2
2	Georgia (GEO)			2		2	0
2	Pakistan (PAK)			1	1	1	1
2	Senegal (SEN)			1	1	1	1
2	Lebanon (LBN)				2	0	2
2	Paraguay (PAR)				2	0	2
1	Ghana (GHA)		1			0	1
1	Peru (PER)		1			0	1
1	Zimbabwe (ZIM)		1			0	1
1	Moldova (MDA)			1		1	0
1	Curaçao (CUW)				1	0	1
1	Ecuador (ECU)				1	0	1
1	Guatemala (GUA)				1	0	1
1	Lithuania (LIT)				1	0	1
1	Philippines (PHI)				1	0	1
1	Puerto Rico (PUR)				1	0	1
1	Syria (SYR)				1	0	1
1	Venezuela (VEN)				1	0	1

== See also ==
- 2026 ATP Tour
- 2026 ATP Challenger Tour
- 2026 WTA Tour
- 2026 ITF Women's World Tennis Tour
