= 2024 Copa Colsanitas =

- Date: 1–7 April
- Edition: 26th
- Category: WTA 250 tournaments
- Draw: 32S / 16D
- Prize money: $267,082
- Surface: Clay / outdoor
- Location: Bogotá, Colombia
- Venue: Country Club

Champions

Singles
- (Colombia) Camila Osorio

Doubles
- (Spain) Cristina Bucșa / Kamilla Rakhimova
← 2023 ·	Copa Colsanitas	· 2025 →

The 2024 Copa Colsanitas Zurich was a professional women's tennis tournament played on outdoor clay courts. It was the 26th edition of the tournament and part of the WTA 250 tournaments on the 2024 WTA Tour. It took place at the Country Club in Bogotá, Colombia, from 1 to 7 April 2024.

== Champions ==
=== Singles ===
- (Colombia) Camila Osorio def. (Czech Republic) Marie Bouzková, 6–3, 7–6^{(7–5)}

=== Doubles ===
- (Spain) Cristina Bucșa / Kamilla Rakhimova def. (Hungary) Anna Bondár / Irina Khromacheva, 7–6^{(7–5)}, 3–6, [10–8]

== Singles main-draw entrants ==
=== Seeds ===
Country	Player	Ranking^{1}	Seed
CZE	Marie Bouzková	39	1
GER	Tatjana Maria	48	2
ESP	Sara Sorribes Tormo	52	3
ESP	Cristina Bucșa	74	4
ARG	Nadia Podoroska	78	5
COL	Camila Osorio	90	6
GER	Laura Siegemund	91	7
	Kamilla Rakhimova	95	8

- ^{1} Rankings as of 18 March 2024.

=== Other entrants ===
The following players received wildcards into the main draw:

- (Colombia) Mariana Higuita
- (Colombia) Valentina Mediorreal
- (Colombia) Yuliana Monroy

The following players received entry from the qualifying draw:

- (Italy) Nuria Brancaccio
- Iryna Shymanovich
- (Canada) Marina Stakusic
- (Romania) Anca Todoni
- (China) You Xiaodi
- (Ukraine) Katarina Zavatska

=== Withdrawals ===
- Erika Andreeva → replaced by (Italy) Lucrezia Stefanini
- (United States) Bernarda Pera → replaced by (Canada) Rebecca Marino
- Diana Shnaider → replaced by (Ukraine) Yuliia Starodubtseva
- (United States) Peyton Stearns → replaced by (Colombia) Emiliana Arango

== Doubles main draw entrants ==
=== Seeds ===
Country	Player	Country	Player	Rank^{1}	Seed
CZE	Marie Bouzková	ESP	Sara Sorribes Tormo	45	1
GEO	Oksana Kalashnikova	POL	Katarzyna Piter	117	2
HUN	Anna Bondár		Irina Khromacheva	119	3
ESP	Cristina Bucșa		Kamilla Rakhimova	166	4

- Rankings are as of 18 March 2024.

=== Other entrants ===
The following pairs received wildcards into the doubles main draw:

- (Colombia) Emiliana Arango / (Colombia) María Paulina Pérez
- (Colombia) Mariana Higuita / (Colombia) Valentina Mediorreal

The following pairs received entry as alternates:

- (Canada) Rebecca Marino / (Canada) Carol Zhao
- (China) You Xiaodi / (Ukraine) Katarina Zavatska

=== Withdrawals ===
- (United Kingdom) Naiktha Bains / (Hungary) Fanny Stollár → replaced by (Canada) Rebecca Marino / (Canada) Carol Zhao
- (Colombia) Camila Osorio / (Argentina) Nadia Podoroska → replaced by (China) You Xiaodi / (Ukraine) Katarina Zavatska
