= Bolivarian Youth Games =

Regional multi-sport event

The Bolivarian Youth Games (Spanish: Juegos Bolivarianos de la Juventud) is a regional multi-sport event for athletes of up to 18 years old, organized by the Organización Deportiva Bolivariana (ODEBO). The games are held every four years with the first edition being held in Sucre, Bolivia from 4 to 14 April 2024.

The age range for athletes was originally approved following the same criteria as the International Olympic Committee for the Youth Olympic Games (between 15 and 18 years old). However, the first edition accepted athletes between 16 and 19 years old so as not to disrupt the participation of athletes who had been preparing for 2023 before the inaugural event was rescheduled from 2023 to 2024.

== History ==
ODEBO launched the Bolivarian Youth Games for the first time in 2010 with Lima, Peru to be the host city of the first edition in 2015. In 2017, after several postponements, Peru resigned to host the games giving way to Sucre, Bolivia being named as the new host city on 10 November 2017. Early 2019, the Games were scheduled to be held between 17 April and 1 May 2020, However, the games again went through several postponements due to various circumstances such as the 2019 Bolivian protests or the social and health impact resulting from the COVID-19 pandemic.

During 2021 and 2022 the postponements continued, until in April 2023 the First Bolivarian Games were finally scheduled to take place between 5 and 14 April 2024.

== The Games ==
Games	Year	Host city	Host nation	Opened by	Start date	End date	Nations	Competitors	Sports	Events	Top placed team
I	2024	Sucre	Bolivia	President Luis Arce	April 4	April 14	7	1,137	24	234	Colombia (COL)
