= Valentina Mediorreal Arias =

Colombian tennis player (born 2007)

Valentina Mediorreal
- Full name: Valentina Mediorreal Arias
- Country (sports): Colombia
- Residence: Bogotá, Colombia
- Born: 2 March 2007 (age 19)
- Plays: Right-handed
- Prize money: $20,388

Singles
- Career record: 14–15
- Highest ranking: No. 727 (23 June 2025)
- Current ranking: No. 776 (9 June 2025)

Grand Slam singles results
- French Open Junior: Q2 (2024)

Doubles
- Career record: 5–12
- Career titles: 1 ITF
- Highest ranking: No. 581 (28 July 2025)
- Current ranking: No. 699 (9 June 2025)

Grand Slam doubles results
- French Open Junior: 2R (2024)
Medal record
Representing Colombia
Women's tennis
Junior Pan American Games
Gold medal – first place	2025 Asunción	Singles
Gold medal – first place	2025 Asunción	Mixed doubles
Bolivarian Youth Games
Gold medal – first place	2024 Sucre	Singles
Gold medal – first place	2024 Sucre	Doubles
Gold medal – first place	2024 Sucre	Mixed doubles
- Last updated on: 17 August 2025.

Valentina Mediorreal Arias (born 2 March 2007) is a Colombian tennis player.

== Early life ==
She began playing tennis at the age of four.

== Career ==
=== Junior career ===
In 2021, she became South American U14 doubles champion alongside Mariana Higuita.

In 2023, she won a J100 tournament in Medellin. She won the singles and the doubles titles at the J300 event in Medellín in March 2024. In the singles she defeated Luna Cinalli in three sets in the final. In the doubles she won alongside her regular playing partner of five years, and compatriot, Mariana Isabel Higuita Barraza. She represented Colombia in the Junior Billie Jean King Cup.

=== Professional career ===
She was awarded a wildcard for the 2024 Copa Colsanitas into the Bogotá in the singles and doubles competitions, for her WTA Tour main draw debut. In the singles she lost to Kamilla Rakhimova in the first round. In the doubles, she and her regular partner from the junior events Mariana Higuita were drawn against their compatriots Emiliana Arango and María Paulina Pérez.

== ITF Circuit finals ==
=== Singles: 1 (runner-up) ===
Legend W15 tournaments (0–1)	Finals by surface Hard (0–1)

Result	W–L	Date	Tournament	Tier	Surface	Opponent	Score
Loss	0–1	May 2025	ITF Kayseri, Turkiye	W15	Hard	(Poland) Martyna Kubka	5–7, 2–6

=== Doubles: 8 (7 title, 1 runner-up) ===
Legend W35 tournaments (1–0) W15 tournaments (6–1)	Finals by surface Hard (6–1) Clay (1–0)

Result	W–L	Date	Tournament	Tier	Surface	Partner	Opponents	Score
Loss	0–1	May 2025	ITF Kayseri, Turkiye	W15	Hard	(Iran) Meshkatolzahra Safi	(Turkey) Duru Söke (Turkey) Doğa Türkmen	2–6, 6–7^{(4)}
Win	1–1	Jun 2025	ITF Kayseri, Turkiye	W15	Hard	(Turkey) Doğa Türkmen	(United Kingdom) Jasmine Conway (Turkey) Ayşegül Mert	7–6^{(5)}, 6–7^{(3)}, [10–5]
Win	2–1	Feb 2026	ITF Manacor, Spain	W15	Hard	(United Kingdom) Esther Adeshina	(Spain) Celia Anson Sánchez (Spain) María Oliver Sánchez	6–1, 6–0
Win	3–1	Feb 2026	ITF Manacor, Spain	W15	Hard	(Mexico) Midori Castillo Meza	(Netherlands) Merel Hoedt (Uzbekistan) Sevil Yuldasheva	7–5, 6–4
Win	4–1	Feb 2026	ITF Manacor, Spain	W15	Hard	(Netherlands) Merel Hoedt	(United Kingdom) Lauryn John-Baptiste (United Kingdom) Eliz Maloney	6–4, 7–5
Win	5–1	Aug 2026	ITF Chacabuco, Argentina	W35	Clay	(Argentina) Sol Ailin Larraya Guidi	(Brazil) Júlia Konishi Camargo Silva (Chile) Fernanda Labraña	7–6^{(5)}, 7–6^{(1)}
Win	6–1	Aug 2026	ITF Porto Velho, Brazil	W15	Hard	(Mexico) Ana Sofía Sánchez	(Brazil) Letícia Garcia Vidal (Brazil) Catarina Melleiro	6–3, 6–4
Win	7–1	Oct 2026	ITF Campina Grande, Brazil	W15	Clay	(Mexico) Ana Sofía Sánchez	(Brazil) Letícia Garcia Vidal (Brazil) Júlia Konishi Camargo Silva	6–2, 6–3
