= Mariana Higuita =

Colombian tennis player (born 2007)

- Full name: Mariana Isabel Higuita Barraza
- Country (sports): Colombia
- Residence: Medellín
- Born: 14 June 2007 (age 18) Sabanalarga
- Prize money: $7,913

Singles
- Career record: 9–16
- Highest ranking: No. 1,092 (16 December 2024)
- Current ranking: No. 1,092 (16 December 2024)

Doubles
- Career record: 1–12
- Highest ranking: No. 1,333 (11 November 2024)
- Current ranking: No. 1,351 (16 December 2024)
Medal record
Representing Colombia
Women's tennis
Bolivarian Youth Games
Gold medal – first place	2024 Sucre	Doubles
Silver medal – second place	2024 Sucre	Singles
- Last updated on: 16 December 2024.

Mariana Isabel Higuita Barraza (born 14 June 2007) is a Colombian tennis player.

== Early life ==
Born in Sabanalarga, Atlántico to parents Luis Alberto and Paola Karina, she moved to Medellín in 2019.

== Career ==
=== Junior career ===
She was South American champion at U12 and U14 levels. In 2021, she also became South American U14 doubles champion alongside Valentina Mediorreal.

She won the doubles at the J500 event in Medellín in March 2024, alongside her regular playing partner of five years, and compatriot, Valentina Mediorreal Arias. In the final they defeated Luna María Cinali of Argentina and Chilean Antonia Veragara Rivera in straight sets. She represented Colombia in the Junior Billie Jean Cup.

=== Professional career ===
She was awarded a wildcard for the 2024 Copa Colsanitas in Bogotá in both the singles and doubles competitions, for her WTA Tour main draw debut. In the singles she lost in the first round to Renata Zarazúa. In the doubles, she and her regular partner from the junior events Valentina Mediorreal were drawn against their compatriots Emiliana Arango and María Paulina Pérez.

== ITF Circuit finals ==
=== Doubles: 1 (1 title) ===
Legend W15 tournaments (1–0)	Finals by surface Clay (1–0)

Result	W–L	Date	Tournament	Tier	Surface	Partner	Opponents	Score
Win	1–0	May 2026	ITF Szentendre, Hungary	W15	Clay	(Argentina) Ana Gobbi Monllau	(Germany) Valentina Steiner (Germany) Sonja Zhenikhova	0–6, 6–4, [10–7]
