= 2022 Copa Colsanitas =

- Date: 4–10 April
- Edition: 24th
- Category: WTA 250 tournaments
- Draw: 32S / 16D
- Prize money: $239,477
- Surface: Clay
- Location: Bogotá, Colombia

Champions

Singles
- (Germany) Tatjana Maria

Doubles
- (Australia) Astra Sharma / (Indonesia) Aldila Sutjiadi
- Copa Colsanitas

The 2022 Copa Colsanitas (branded as the Copa Colsanitas presentado por Zurich for sponsorship reasons) was a women's tennis tournament played on outdoor clay courts. It was the 24th edition of the Copa Colsanitas and part of the 250 category of the 2022 WTA Tour. It took place at the Country Club in Bogotá, Colombia, from 4 April until 10 April 2022. Unseeded Tatjana Maria, who entered the main draws as a qualifier, won the singles title.

== Finals ==
=== Singles ===
- (Germany) Tatjana Maria defeated (Brazil) Laura Pigossi, 6–3, 4–6, 6–2.

This was Maria's second WTA Tour singles title, and first since 2018.

=== Doubles ===
- (Australia) Astra Sharma / (Indonesia) Aldila Sutjiadi defeated (United States) Emina Bektas / (United Kingdom) Tara Moore, 4–6, 6–4, [11–9]

== Points and prize money ==
=== Point distribution ===
Event	W	F	SF	QF	Round of 16	Round of 32	Q	Q2	Q1
Singles	280	180	110	60	30	1	18	12	1
Doubles	280	180	110	60	1	—N/a	—N/a	—N/a	—N/a

=== Prize money ===
Event	W	F	SF	QF	Round of 16	Round of 32	Q2	Q1
Singles	$29,200	$16,398	$10,100	$5,800	$3,675	$2,675	$1,950	$1,270
Doubles*	$10,300	$6,000	$3,800	$2,300	$1,750	—N/a	—N/a	—N/a

_{*per team}

== Singles main-draw entrants ==
=== Seeds ===
Country	Player	Ranking^{1}	Seed
COL	Camila Osorio	34	1
BRA	Beatriz Haddad Maia	62	2
SWE	Rebecca Peterson	79	3
HUN	Panna Udvardy	83	4
FRA	Harmony Tan	91	5
SVK	Anna Karolína Schmiedlová	92	6
AUS	Astra Sharma	96	7
GBR	Harriet Dart	99	8

- ^{1} Rankings as of 21 March 2022.

=== Other entrants ===
The following players received wildcards into the main draw:

- (Colombia) María Herazo González
- (Colombia) Yuliana Lizarazo
- (Colombia) Yuliana Monroy

The following players received entry from the qualifying draw:

- (Argentina) María Lourdes Carlé
- (Netherlands) Suzan Lamens
- (Germany) Tatjana Maria
- (Turkey) İpek Öz
- (Brazil) Laura Pigossi
- (Chile) Daniela Seguel

=== Withdrawals ===
Before the tournament

- (Czech Republic) Marie Bouzková → replaced by (Greece) Despina Papamichail
- (Spain) Cristina Bucșa → replaced by (Italy) Lucrezia Stefanini
- (Japan) Mai Hontama → replaced by (Italy) Sara Errani
- (Argentina) Nadia Podoroska → replaced by (Switzerland) Ylena In-Albon
- (China) Wang Qiang → replaced by (Argentina) Paula Ormaechea

Retirement

- (Switzerland) Ylena In-Albon

== Doubles main draw entrants ==
=== Seeds ===
Country	Player	Country	Player	Rank^{1}	Seed
	Natela Dzalamidze	USA	Sabrina Santamaria	113	1
ROU	Irina Bara	GEO	Ekaterine Gorgodze	127	2
USA	Kaitlyn Christian		Lidziya Marozava	129	3
FRA	Elixane Lechemia	USA	Ingrid Neel	145	4

- ^{1} Rankings as of March 21, 2022.

=== Other entrants ===
The following pairs received a wildcard into the doubles main draw:

- (Chile) Bárbara Gatica / (Brazil) Rebeca Pereira
- (Colombia) María Herazo González / (Colombia) Yuliana Lizarazo
