= 2022 Copa Colsanitas – Doubles =

Tennis tournament

Doubles
- 2022 Copa Colsanitas

Final
- Champions: (Australia) Astra Sharma (Indonesia) Aldila Sutjiadi
- Runners-up: (United States) Emina Bektas (United Kingdom) Tara Moore
- Score: 4–6, 6–4, [11–9]

Details
- Draw: 16
- Seeds: 4

Events
Singles	Doubles
← 2021 ·	Copa Colsanitas	· 2023 →

Astra Sharma and Aldila Sutjiadi defeated Emina Bektas and Tara Moore in the final, 4–6, 6–4, [11–9], to win the doubles tennis title at the 2022 Copa Colsanitas. The win earned Sharma her second Copa Colsanitas doubles title after first winning in 2019, and Sutjiadi her first career Women's Tennis Association (WTA) title.

Elixane Lechemia and Ingrid Neel were the defending champions, but lost in the first round to Camila Osorio and Beatriz Haddad Maia.

== Seeds ==
1. Natela Dzalamidze / (United States) Sabrina Santamaria (quarterfinals)
2. (Romania) Irina Bara / (Georgia (country)) Ekaterine Gorgodze (quarterfinals)
3. (United States) Kaitlyn Christian / Lidziya Marozava (first round)
4. (France) Elixane Lechemia / (United States) Ingrid Neel (first round)

== Draw ==
=== Key ===
- Q = Qualifier
- WC = Wild card
- LL = Lucky loser
- Alt = Alternate
- SE = Special exempt
- PR = Protected ranking
- ITF = ITF entry
- JE = Junior exempt
- w/o = Walkover
- r = Retired
- d = Defaulted
- SR = Special ranking

=== Draw ===
First Round
1	N Dzalamidze (United States) S Santamaria	6	7
(Italy) S Errani (Serbia) A Krunić	2	5
(Hungary) RL Jani (Hungary) P Udvardy	6	2	[9]
WC	(Colombia) M Herazo González (Colombia) Y Lizarazo	1	6	[11]
3	(United States) K Christian; L Marozava	6	3	[2]
(Brazil) C Alves (Venezuela) A Gámiz	3	6	[10]
WC	(Chile) B Gatica (Brazil) R Pereira	3	2
(United States) E Bektas (United Kingdom) T Moore	6	6
(Germany) J Lohoff (United Kingdom) S Murray Sharan	6^{9}	3
A Anshba (Greece) V Grammatikopoulou	7^{11}	6
(Brazil) B Haddad Maia (Colombia) C Osorio	7^{7}	2	[10]
4	(France) E Lechemia (United States) I Neel	6^{2}	6	[1]
(Australia) A Sharma (Indonesia) A Sutjiadi	7	7
(Sweden) R Peterson (Slovakia) AK Schmiedlová	5	5
K Rakhimova; Y Sizikova	6	4	[7]
2	(Romania) I Bara (Georgia (country)) E Gorgodze	3	6	[10]

Quarterfinals
1	N Dzalamidze (United States) S Santamaria	5	6	[8]
WC	(Colombia) M Herazo González (Colombia) Y Lizarazo	7	2	[10]
(Brazil) C Alves (Venezuela) A Gámiz	7^{7}	4	[5]
(United States) E Bektas (United Kingdom) T Moore	6^{2}	6	[10]
A Anshba (Greece) V Grammatikopoulou	6^{4}	5
(Brazil) B Haddad Maia (Colombia) C Osorio	7^{7}	7
(Australia) A Sharma (Indonesia) A Sutjiadi	6	7
2	(Romania) I Bara (Georgia (country)) E Gorgodze	4	5

Semifinals
WC	(Colombia) M Herazo González (Colombia) Y Lizarazo	4	6^{5}
(United States) E Bektas (United Kingdom) T Moore	6	7^{7}
(Brazil) B Haddad Maia (Colombia) C Osorio	6	5	[6]
(Australia) A Sharma (Indonesia) A Sutjiadi	4	7	[10]

Final
(United States) E Bektas (United Kingdom) T Moore	6	4	[9]
(Australia) A Sharma (Indonesia) A Sutjiadi	4	6	[11]
