= 2023 Copa Colsanitas =

- Date: 3–9 April
- Edition: 25th
- Category: WTA 250 tournaments
- Draw: 32S / 16D
- Prize money: $259,303
- Surface: Clay / outdoor
- Location: Bogotá, Colombia
- Venue: Country Club

Champions

Singles
- (Germany) Tatjana Maria

Doubles
- Irina Khromacheva / Iryna Shymanovich
- Copa Colsanitas

The 2023 Copa Colsanitas (branded as the 2023 Copa Colsanitas presentado por Zurich for sponsorship reasons) was a professional women's tennis tournament played on outdoor clay courts. It was the 25th edition of the tournament and part of the 250 category of the 2023 WTA Tour. It took place at the Country Club in Bogotá, Colombia, from 3 April to 9 April 2023. Second-seeded Tatjana Maria won her second consecutive singles title at the event.

== Finals ==
=== Singles ===
(Germany) Tatjana Maria defeated (United States) Peyton Stearns 6–3, 2–6, 6–4.

- It was Maria's only WTA singles title of the year and the 3rd of her career.

=== Doubles ===
Irina Khromacheva / Iryna Shymanovich defeated (Georgia (country)) Oksana Kalashnikova / (Poland) Katarzyna Piter 6–1, 3–6, [10–6]

== Points and prize money ==
=== Point distribution ===
Event	W	F	SF	QF	Round of 16	Round of 32	Q	Q2	Q1
Singles	280	180	110	60	30	1	18	12	1
Doubles	280	180	110	60	1	—N/a	—N/a	—N/a	—N/a

=== Prize money ===
Event	W	F	SF	QF	Round of 16	Round of 32	Q2	Q1
Singles	$34,228	$20,226	$11,276	$6,418	$3,920	$2,804	$2,075	$1,340
Doubles*	$12,477	$7,000	$4,020	$2,400	$1,848	—N/a	—N/a	—N/a

_{*per team}

== Singles main-draw entrants ==
=== Seeds ===
Country	Player	Ranking^{1}	Seed
BEL	Elise Mertens	39	1
GER	Tatjana Maria	65	2
ESP	Nuria Párrizas Díaz	88	3
	Kamilla Rakhimova	92	4
ITA	Sara Errani	99	5
BRA	Laura Pigossi	102	6
ESP	Sara Sorribes Tormo	106	7
ARG	Nadia Podoroska	107	8

- ^{1} Rankings as of 20 March 2023.

=== Other entrants ===
The following players received wildcards into the main draw:

- (Colombia) Emiliana Arango
- (Canada) Eugenie Bouchard
- (Colombia) Antonia Samudio

The following player received entry using a protected ranking into the main draw:

- (United Kingdom) Francesca Jones

The following players received entry from the qualifying draw:

- (Brazil) Carolina Alves
- (Italy) Nuria Brancaccio
- (Austria) Sinja Kraus
- (Serbia) Natalija Stevanović
- (France) Harmony Tan
- (Spain) Rosa Vicens Mas

=== Withdrawals ===
Before the tournament

- (Ukraine) Kateryna Baindl → replaced by (Argentina) María Lourdes Carlé
- (France) Léolia Jeanjean → replaced by (Canada) Carol Zhao
- (Slovenia) Kaja Juvan → replaced by (United States) Katrina Scott
- (Germany) Eva Lys → replaced by (Spain) Aliona Bolsova
- (Sweden) Rebecca Peterson → replaced by (Greece) Despina Papamichail
- (Colombia) Camila Osorio → replaced by (Sweden) Mirjam Björklund
- (Italy) Lucrezia Stefanini → replaced by (United Kingdom) Francesca Jones

== Doubles main draw entrants ==
=== Seeds ===
Country	Player	Country	Player	Rank^{1}	Seed
GEO	Natela Dzalamidze		Kamilla Rakhimova	153	1
USA	Kaitlyn Christian	USA	Sabrina Santamaria	168	2
ESP	Aliona Bolsova	VEN	Andrea Gámiz	171	3
AUS	Olivia Tjandramulia	TPE	Wu Fang-hsien	200	4

- Rankings are as of March 20, 2023.

=== Other entrants ===
The following pairs received wildcards into the doubles main draw:

- (Colombia) Emiliana Arango / (Colombia) María Herazo González
- (Romania) Irina Bara / (Italy) Sara Errani

=== Withdrawals ===
- (Slovenia) Dalila Jakupović / (Netherlands) Rosalie van der Hoek → replaced by (Slovenia) Dalila Jakupović / (Greece) Despina Papamichail
