= 2012 Copa Sony Ericsson Colsanitas =

- Date: 13–19 February
- Edition: 15th
- Category: WTA International
- Draw: 32S / 16D
- Prize money: $220,000
- Surface: Clay / outdoor
- Location: Bogotá, Colombia

Champions

Singles
- (Spain) Lara Arruabarrena-Vecino

Doubles
- (Czech Republic) Eva Birnerová / (Russia) Alexandra Panova
- Copa Colsanitas

The 2012 Copa Sony Ericsson Colsanitas was a women's tennis tournament played on outdoor clay courts. It was the 15th edition of the Copa Sony Ericsson Colsanitas, and was on the International category of the 2012 WTA Tour. The tournament was played at the Club Campestre El Rancho in Bogotá, Colombia, from 13 to 19 February. Unseeded Lara Arruabarrena-Vecino won the singles title.

== Finals ==
=== Singles ===
- (Spain) Lara Arruabarrena-Vecino defeated (Russia) Alexandra Panova 6–2, 7–5
- It was Arruabarrena-Vecino's only singles title of the year and the 1st of her career.

=== Doubles ===
- (Czech Republic) Eva Birnerová / (Russia) Alexandra Panova defeated (Luxembourg) Mandy Minella / (Switzerland) Stefanie Vögele, 6–2, 6–2

== Singles main draw entrants ==
=== Seeds ===
Country	Player	Ranking^{1}	Seeds
NZL	Marina Erakovic	56	1
ROU	Alexandra Dulgheru	61	2
SUI	Romina Oprandi	63	3
AUS	Jelena Dokić	67	4
ARG	Gisela Dulko	69	5
FRA	Mathilde Johansson	73	6
ESP	Lourdes Domínguez Lino	82	7
AUT	Patricia Mayr-Achleitner	96	8

- ^{1} Rankings as of February 6, 2012

=== Other entrants ===
The following players received wildcards into the main draw:

- (Colombia) Catalina Castaño
- (Colombia) Karen Castiblanco
- (Colombia) Yuliana Lizarazo

The following players received entry from the qualifying draw:

- (Spain) Inés Ferrer Suárez
- (Kazakhstan) Sesil Karatantcheva
- (Argentina) Paula Ormaechea
- (Kazakhstan) Yaroslava Shvedova

=== Withdrawals ===
- (Italy) Sara Errani (right knee injury)

== Doubles main draw entrants ==
=== Seeds ===
Country	Player	Country	Player	Rank^{1}	Seed
CZE	Eva Birnerová	RUS	Alexandra Panova	156	1
CAN	Sharon Fichman	CHN	Sun Shengnan	217	2
USA	Tetiana Luzhanska	GER	Kathrin Wörle	282	3
CRO	Maria Abramović	CAN	Marie-Ève Pelletier	283	4

- ^{1} Rankings are as of February 6, 2012

=== Other entrants ===
The following pairs received wildcards into the doubles main draw:

- (Colombia) Karen Castiblanco / (Argentina) Paula Ormaechea
- (Argentina) Gisela Dulko / (Argentina) Paola Suárez

=== Retirements ===
- (Switzerland) Romina Oprandi (right knee injury)
