= 2022 Copa Colsanitas – Singles =

Singles
- 2022 Copa Colsanitas

Final
- Champion: (Germany) Tatjana Maria
- Runner-up: (Brazil) Laura Pigossi
- Score: 6–3, 4–6, 6–2

Details
- Draw: 32
- Seeds: 8

Events
Singles	Doubles
← 2021 ·	Copa Colsanitas	· 2023 →

Tatjana Maria defeated Laura Pigossi in the final, 6–3, 4–6, 6–2 to win the singles tennis title at the 2022 Copa Colsanitas. It was her second WTA Tour singles title, her first since 2018, and made her the first mother-of-two WTA Tour title holder in the 21st century. Ranked as the world No. 237, Maria also became the lowest-ranked player to win a WTA Tour title since Margarita Gasparyan in 2018. This was the first WTA Tour final contested between two qualifiers since the 2021 Lyon Open, and the first WTA Tour final contested by players ranked outside the top 200 since the inception of the computer rankings.

Camila Osorio was the defending champion, but lost in the semifinals to Pigossi.

== Seeds ==
1. (Colombia) Camila Osorio (semifinals)
2. (Brazil) Beatriz Haddad Maia (second round)
3. (Sweden) Rebecca Peterson (second round)
4. (Hungary) Panna Udvardy (first round)
5. (France) Harmony Tan (first round)
6. (Slovakia) Anna Karolína Schmiedlová (first round)
7. (Australia) Astra Sharma (first round)
8. (United Kingdom) Harriet Dart (first round)

== Draw ==
=== Key ===
- Q = Qualifier
- WC = Wild card
- LL = Lucky loser
- Alt = Alternate
- SE = Special exempt
- PR = Protected ranking
- ITF = ITF entry
- JE = Junior exempt
- w/o = Walkover
- r = Retired
- d = Defaulted
- SR = Special ranking

=== Finals ===
Semifinals
1	(Colombia) Camila Osorio	5	6^{2}
Q	(Brazil) Laura Pigossi	7	7^{7}
Q	(Germany) Tatjana Maria	6	6
Kamilla Rakhimova	2	2

Final
Q	(Brazil) Laura Pigossi	3	6	2
Q	(Germany) Tatjana Maria	6	4	6

=== Top half ===
First Round
1	(Colombia) C Osorio	7^{7}	2	2
(Switzerland) Y In-Albon	6^{4}	6	2^{r}
Q	(Turkey) İ Öz	6	7
Q	(Chile) D Seguel	2	5
(Greece) D Papamichail	3	4
(Italy) L Stefanini	6	6
E Avanesyan	6	6
8	(United Kingdom) H Dart	1	2
4	(Hungary) P Udvardy	5	1
(Ukraine) D Yastremska	7	6
(Switzerland) S Vögele	0	3
(Italy) S Errani	6	6
WC	(Colombia) Y Monroy	0	3
(Georgia (country)) E Gorgodze	6	6
Q	(Brazil) L Pigossi	6	6
5	(France) H Tan	4	3

Second Round
1	(Colombia) C Osorio	6	7^{7}
Q	(Turkey) İ Öz	3	6^{4}
(Italy) L Stefanini	2	2
E Avanesyan	6	6
(Ukraine) D Yastremska	6	7^{7}
(Italy) S Errani	3	6^{3}
(Georgia (country)) E Gorgodze	3	2
Q	(Brazil) L Pigossi	6	6

Quarterfinals
1	(Colombia) C Osorio	6	6
E Avanesyan	1	4
(Ukraine) D Yastremska	2	6	6^{3}
Q	(Brazil) L Pigossi	6	4	7^{7}

Semifinals
1	(Colombia) C Osorio	5	6^{2}
Q	(Brazil) L Pigossi	7	7^{7}

=== Bottom half ===
First Round
6	(Slovakia) AK Schmiedlová	6	6^{1}	2
WC	(Colombia) Y Lizarazo	4	7^{7}	6
(Mexico) R Zarazúa	1	3
(Sweden) M Björklund	6	6
Q	(Germany) T Maria	6	6
Q	(Argentina) ML Carlé	1	2
WC	(Colombia) M Herazo González	4	3
3	(Sweden) R Peterson	6	6
7	(Australia) A Sharma	4	6	4
Q	(Netherlands) S Lamens	6	1	6
(Argentina) P Ormaechea	3	5
(Romania) I Bara	6	7
(Serbia) A Krunić	2	6	5
K Rakhimova	6	3	7
(Hungary) RL Jani	4	6	5
2	(Brazil) B Haddad Maia	6	4	7

Second Round
WC	(Colombia) Y Lizarazo	1	4
(Sweden) M Björklund	6	6
Q	(Germany) T Maria	6	6
3	(Sweden) R Peterson	1	4
Q	(Netherlands) S Lamens	0	6	4
(Romania) I Bara	6	0	6
K Rakhimova	4	6	6
2	(Brazil) B Haddad Maia	6	3	4

Quarterfinals
(Sweden) M Björklund	1	4
Q	(Germany) T Maria	6	6
(Romania) I Bara	3	6	2
K Rakhimova	6	4	6

Semifinals
Q	(Germany) T Maria	6	6
K Rakhimova	2	2

== Qualifying ==
=== Seeds ===
1. (Greece) Valentini Grammatikopoulou (qualifying competition)
2. (United States) Emina Bektas (qualifying competition)
3. (Brazil) Carolina Alves (qualifying competition)
4. (Australia) Seone Mendez (first round)
5. (Bosnia and Herzegovina) Dea Herdželaš (qualifying competition)
6. (Brazil) Laura Pigossi (qualified)
7. (Spain) Andrea Lázaro García (first round)
8. (Italy) Giulia Gatto-Monticone (first round)
9. (United States) Hanna Chang (first round)
10. (Chile) Daniela Seguel (qualified)
11. (Switzerland) Conny Perrin (first round)
12. (Argentina) María Lourdes Carlé (qualified)

=== Qualifiers ===
1. (Turkey) İpek Öz
2. (Netherlands) Suzan Lamens
3. (Chile) Daniela Seguel
4. (Germany) Tatjana Maria
5. (Argentina) María Lourdes Carlé
6. (Brazil) Laura Pigossi

=== Qualifying draw ===
==== First qualifier ====
First round
1	(Greece) Valentini Grammatikopoulou	6	6
WC	(Colombia) María Paulina Pérez	3	3
(Turkey) İpek Öz	6	2	7
7	(Spain) Andrea Lázaro García	4	6	5

Qualifying competition
1	(Greece) Valentini Grammatikopoulou	5	4
(Turkey) İpek Öz	7	6

==== Second qualifier ====
First round
2	(United States) Emina Bektas	7^{7}	4	6
(Italy) Martina Di Giuseppe	6^{1}	6	4
(Netherlands) Suzan Lamens	7^{7}	6
8	(Italy) Giulia Gatto-Monticone	6^{2}	1

Qualifying competition
2	(United States) Emina Bektas	4	2
(Netherlands) Suzan Lamens	6	6

==== Third qualifier ====
First round
3	(Brazil) Carolina Alves	6	6
WC	(Colombia) María Torres Murcia	1	1
WC	(Colombia) Kelly Vargas González	0	1
10	(Chile) Daniela Seguel	6	6

Qualifying competition
3	(Brazil) Carolina Alves	2	4
10	(Chile) Daniela Seguel	6	6

==== Fourth qualifier ====
First round
4	(Australia) Seone Mendez	3	2
(Chile) Bárbara Gatica	6	6
(Germany) Tatjana Maria	6	6
11	(Switzerland) Conny Perrin	1	0

Qualifying competition
(Chile) Bárbara Gatica	6	3	6^{3}
(Germany) Tatjana Maria	2	6	7^{7}

==== Fifth qualifier ====
First round
5	(Bosnia and Herzegovina) Dea Herdželaš	6	6
(Spain) Irene Burillo Escorihuela	3	4
WC	(Bolivia) Noelia Zeballos	5	3
12	(Argentina) María Lourdes Carlé	7	6

Qualifying competition
5	(Bosnia and Herzegovina) Dea Herdželaš	3	4
12	(Argentina) María Lourdes Carlé	6	6

==== Sixth qualifier ====
First round
6	(Brazil) Laura Pigossi	4	7	6
(Latvia) Daniela Vismane	6	5	1
(China) You Xiaodi	6	6
9	(United States) Hanna Chang	2	3

Qualifying competition
6	(Brazil) Laura Pigossi	6	6
(China) You Xiaodi	2	3
