= 2023 Copa Colsanitas – Doubles =

Tennis tournament

Doubles
- 2023 Copa Colsanitas

Final
- Champions: Irina Khromacheva; Iryna Shymanovich
- Runners-up: (Georgia (country)) Oksana Kalashnikova (Poland) Katarzyna Piter
- Score: 6–1, 3–6, [10–6]

Details
- Draw: 16
- Seeds: 4

Events
Singles	Doubles
← 2022 ·	Copa Colsanitas	· 2024 →

Irina Khromacheva and Iryna Shymanovich defeated Oksana Kalashnikova and Katarzyna Piter in the final, 6–1, 3–6, [10–6] to win the doubles tennis title at the 2023 Copa Colsanitas. It marked Khromacheva's second career WTA title, both at the tournament, and Shymanovich's first.

Astra Sharma and Aldila Sutjiadi were the reigning champions, but Sharma chose not to participate and Sutjiadi competed in Charleston instead.

== Seeds ==
1. (Georgia (country)) Natela Dzalamidze / Kamilla Rakhimova (first round)
2. (United States) Kaitlyn Christian / (United States) Sabrina Santamaria (first round)
3. (Spain) Aliona Bolsova / (Venezuela) Andrea Gámiz (first round)
4. (Australia) Olivia Tjandramulia / (Chinese Taipei) Wu Fang-hsien (first round)

== Draw ==
=== Key ===
- Q = Qualifier
- WC = Wild card
- LL = Lucky loser
- Alt = Alternate
- SE = Special exempt
- PR = Protected ranking
- ITF = ITF entry
- JE = Junior exempt
- w/o = Walkover
- r = Retired
- d = Defaulted
- SR = Special ranking

=== Draw ===
First round
1	(Georgia (country)) N Dzalamidze; K Rakhimova	3	5
(Slovenia) D Jakupović (Greece) D Papamichail	6	7
(Indonesia) J Rompies (India) P Thombare	5	2
(Georgia (country)) O Kalashnikova (Poland) K Piter	7	6
3	(Spain) A Bolsova (Venezuela) A Gámiz	7^{7}	6^{9}	[7]
(Colombia) Y Lizarazo (Colombia) MP Pérez	6^{1}	7^{11}	[10]
(Argentina) N Podoroska (Spain) S Sorribes Tormo	6	4	[5]
L Marozava (Brazil) L Pigossi	2	6	[10]
I Khromacheva; I Shymanovich	6	6
A Gabueva (Switzerland) C Perrin	0	2
(United States) Q Gleason (France) E Lechemia	6	6
4	(Australia) O Tjandramulia (Chinese Taipei) F-h Wu	2	3
WC	(Colombia) E Arango (Colombia) M Herazo González	3	6	[8]
WC	(Romania) I Bara (Italy) S Errani	6	4	[10]
(Mexico) F Contreras (Brazil) I Gamarra Martins	6	7^{9}
2	(United States) K Christian (United States) S Santamaria	4	6^{7}

Quarterfinals
(Slovenia) D Jakupović (Greece) D Papamichail	3	6	[9]
(Georgia (country)) O Kalashnikova (Poland) K Piter	6	2	[11]
(Colombia) Y Lizarazo (Colombia) MP Pérez	4	6	[6]
L Marozava (Brazil) L Pigossi	6	4	[10]
I Khromacheva; I Shymanovich	4	6	[10]
(United States) Q Gleason (France) E Lechemia	6	2	[8]
WC	(Romania) I Bara (Italy) S Errani	7^{7}	6
(Mexico) F Contreras (Brazil) I Gamarra Martins	6^{3}	1

Semifinals
(Georgia (country)) O Kalashnikova (Poland) K Piter	6	6
L Marozava (Brazil) L Pigossi	2	4
I Khromacheva; I Shymanovich	6	3	[14]
WC	(Romania) I Bara (Italy) S Errani	3	6	[12]

Final
(Georgia (country)) O Kalashnikova (Poland) K Piter	1	6	[6]
I Khromacheva; I Shymanovich	6	3	[10]
