= 2026 Copa Colsanitas – Doubles =

Doubles
- 2026 Copa Colsanitas

Final
- Champions: (United States) Caroline Dolehide; Irina Khromacheva
- Runners-up: (Ukraine) Valeriya Strakhova; Anastasia Tikhonova
- Score: 7–6^{(7–5)}, 6-4

Details
- Draw: 16
- Seeds: 4

Events
Singles	Doubles
- Copa Colsanitas

Caroline Dolehide and Irina Khromacheva defeated Valeriya Strakhova and Anastasia Tikhonova in the final, 7–6^{(7–5)}, 6–4 to win the doubles tennis title at the 2026 Copa Colsanitas. It was the third WTA Tour doubles title for Dolehide and ninth for Khromacheva.

Cristina Bucșa and Sara Sorribes Tormo were the reigning champions, but they did not participate this year.

== Seeds ==
1. (United States) Caroline Dolehide / Irina Khromacheva (champions)
2. (Chinese Taipei) Liang En-shuo / (China) Yang Zhaoxuan (quarterfinals)
3. (Netherlands) Isabelle Haverlag / (United Kingdom) Maia Lumsden (first round)
4. (Belgium) Magali Kempen / (Poland) Katarzyna Piter (semifinals)

== Draw ==
Key

- Q = Qualifier
- WC = Wild card
- LL = Lucky loser
- Alt = Alternate
- ITF = ITF entry
- PR = Protected ranking
- SR = Special ranking
- SE = Special exempt
- JE = Junior exempt
- JR = Junior Accelerator Programme entrant
- CO = College Accelerator Programme entrant
- NG = Next Gen Accelerator Program entrant
- w/o = Walkover
- r = Retired
- d = Defaulted

=== Draw ===
First round
1	(United States) C Dolehide; I Khromacheva	6	7^{23}
(France) E Cascino (Argentina) N Fossa Huergo	3	6^{21}
(Colombia) E Arango (Hungary) P Udvardy	7	5	[10]
(United Kingdom) E Appleton (Brazil) I Martins	5	7	[3]
4	(Belgium) M Kempen (Poland) K Piter	4	7^{7}	[10]
(Japan) M Kobori (Thailand) P Plipuech	6	6^{4}	[4]
(Spain) I Burillo (Spain) A Herrero Liñana	2	3
A Blinkova (Argentina) ML Carlé	6	6
(Spain) Y Cavallé Reimers (Brazil) L Pigossi	6	6
WC	(Colombia) V Mediorreal (Argentina) J Riera	3	0
(Latvia) D Semeņistaja (Belgium) H Vandewinkel	6	7^{7}
3	(Netherlands) I Haverlag (United Kingdom) M Lumsden	0	6^{3}
(Ukraine) V Strakhova; A Tikhonova	6	6
WC	(Colombia) SA Lozano Avellaneda (Colombia) LV Villamil Arias	2	4
(Slovenia) D Jakupović (Slovenia) N Radišić	6	3	[5]
2	(Chinese Taipei) E-s Liang (China) Z Yang	3	6	[10]

Quarterfinals
1	(United States) C Dolehide; I Khromacheva	6	6
(Colombia) E Arango (Hungary) P Udvardy	2	4
4	(Belgium) M Kempen (Poland) K Piter	4	6	[10]
A Blinkova (Argentina) ML Carlé	6	4	[8]
(Spain) Y Cavallé Reimers (Brazil) L Pigossi	7^{7}	3	[12]
(Latvia) D Semeņistaja (Belgium) H Vandewinkel	6^{3}	6	[10]
(Ukraine) V Strakhova; A Tikhonova	6	6
2	(Chinese Taipei) E-s Liang (China) Z Yang	4	3

Semifinals
1	(United States) C Dolehide; I Khromacheva	6	6
4	(Belgium) M Kempen (Poland) K Piter	2	2
(Spain) Y Cavallé Reimers (Brazil) L Pigossi	4	6	[6]
(Ukraine) V Strakhova; A Tikhonova	6	3	[10]

Final
1	(United States) C Dolehide; I Khromacheva	7^{7}	6
(Ukraine) V Strakhova; A Tikhonova	6^{5}	4
