= 2026 Copa Colsanitas =

- Date: 30 March – 5 April
- Edition: 28th
- Category: WTA 250
- Draw: 32S / 16D
- Prize money: $283,347
- Surface: Clay / outdoor
- Location: Bogotá, Colombia
- Venue: Country Club

Champions

Singles
- (Czech Republic) Marie Bouzková

Doubles
- (United States) Caroline Dolehide / Irina Khromacheva
- Copa Colsanitas

The 2026 Copa Colsanitas Colsubsidio was a professional women's tennis tournament played on outdoor clay courts. It was the 28th edition of the tournament and part of the WTA 250 tournaments on the 2026 WTA Tour. It took place at the Country Club in Bogotá, Colombia, from 30 March to 5 April 2026.

== Champions ==
=== Singles ===
- (Czech Republic) Marie Bouzková def. (Hungary) Panna Udvardy, 6–7^{(7–9)}, 6–2, 6–2

=== Doubles ===
- (United States) Caroline Dolehide / Irina Khromacheva def. (Ukraine) Valeriya Strakhova / Anastasia Tikhonova, 7–6^{(7–5)}, 6–4

== Singles main-draw entrants ==
=== Seeds ===
Country	Player	Ranking^{1}	Seed
CZE	Marie Bouzková	32	1
ESP	Jéssica Bouzas Maneiro	48	2
COL	Camila Osorio	58	3
GER	Tatjana Maria	59	4
GER	Ella Seidel	86	5
	Anna Blinkova	92	6
GBR	Francesca Jones	93	7
HUN	Panna Udvardy	97	8

- ^{1} Rankings as of 16 March 2026.

=== Other entrants ===
The following players received wildcards into the main draw:

- (Colombia) Valentina Mediorreal
- (United States) Julieta Pareja
- (Argentina) Julia Riera
- (Colombia) María Torres Murcia

The following player received entry using a protected ranking:

- (United States) Robin Montgomery

The following players received entry from the qualifying draw:

- (Spain) Irene Burillo
- (France) Séléna Janicijevic
- (Bulgaria) Lia Karatancheva
- (Argentina) Jazmín Ortenzi
- (Mexico) Ana Sofía Sánchez
- Anastasia Tikhonova

=== Withdrawals ===
- (Italy) Lucia Bronzetti → replaced by (France) Carole Monnet
- (Chinese Taipei) Joanna Garland → replaced by (United States) Elizabeth Mandlik
- (France) Léolia Jeanjean → replaced by (Spain) Guiomar Maristany

== Doubles main draw entrants ==
=== Seeds ===
Country	Player	Country	Player	Rank^{1}	Seed
USA	Caroline Dolehide		Irina Khromacheva	81	1
TPE	Liang En-shuo	CHN	Yang Zhaoxuan	127	2
NED	Isabelle Haverlag	GBR	Maia Lumsden	141	3
BEL	Magali Kempen	POL	Katarzyna Piter	147	4

- Rankings are as of 16 March 2026.

=== Other entrants ===
The following pairs received wildcards into the doubles main draw:

- (Colombia) Sara Alejandra Lozano Avellaneda / (Colombia) Laura Valentina Villamil Arias
- (Colombia) Valentina Mediorreal / (Argentina) Julia Riera
