= 2023 Copa Colsanitas – Singles =

Singles
- 2023 Copa Colsanitas

Final
- Champion: (Germany) Tatjana Maria
- Runner-up: (United States) Peyton Stearns
- Score: 6–3, 2–6, 6–4

Details
- Draw: 32
- Seeds: 8

Events
| Singles | Doubles |
| ← 2022 · | Copa Colsanitas | · 2024 → |

Defending champion Tatjana Maria defeated Peyton Stearns in the final, 6–3, 2–6, 6–4 to win the singles tennis title at the 2023 Copa Colsanitas. Maria became the first player since Fabiola Zuluaga in 2004 to successfully defend the singles title at Bogota. Stearns was contesting her first WTA Tour final.

== Seeds ==
1. (Belgium) Elise Mertens (first round)
2. (Germany) Tatjana Maria (champion)
3. (Spain) Nuria Párrizas Díaz (first round)
4. Kamilla Rakhimova (semifinals)
5. (Italy) Sara Errani (first round)
6. (Brazil) Laura Pigossi (quarterfinals)
7. (Spain) Sara Sorribes Tormo (quarterfinals)
8. (Argentina) Nadia Podoroska (first round)

== Draw ==
=== Key ===
- Q = Qualifier
- WC = Wild card
- LL = Lucky loser
- Alt = Alternate
- SE = Special exempt
- PR = Protected ranking
- ITF = ITF entry
- JE = Junior exempt
- w/o = Walkover
- r = Retired
- d = Defaulted
- SR = Special ranking

=== Finals ===
Semifinals
(United States) Peyton Stearns | 3 | 6 | 6
4 | Kamilla Rakhimova | 6 | 2 | 2
PR | (United Kingdom) Francesca Jones | 3 | 4
2 | (Germany) Tatjana Maria | 6 | 6

Final
(United States) Peyton Stearns | 3 | 6 | 4
2 | (Germany) Tatjana Maria | 6 | 2 | 6

=== Top half ===
First round
1 | (Belgium) E Mertens | 1 | 6 | 6^{3}
(Sweden) M Björklund | 6 | 4 | 7^{7}
(Slovenia) T Zidanšek | 6 | 6
(Hungary) RL Jani | 0 | 1
Q | (Spain) R Vicens Mas | 3 | 1
(United States) P Stearns | 6 | 6
E Avanesyan | 6 | 6
5 | (Italy) S Errani | 1 | 0
4 | K Rakhimova | 7^{7} | 6
(Cyprus) R Șerban | 6^{3} | 3
WC | (Canada) E Bouchard | 6 | 6
(Switzerland) Y In-Albon | 3 | 2
WC | (Colombia) E Arango | 7 | 3
Q | (France) H Tan | 5 | 1^{r}
(Spain) A Bolsova | 0 | 4
7 | (Spain) S Sorribes Tormo | 6 | 6

Second round
(Sweden) M Björklund | 6^{3} | 6^{3}
(Slovenia) T Zidanšek | 7^{7} | 7^{7}
(United States) P Stearns | 6 | 6
E Avanesyan | 4 | 1
4 | K Rakhimova | 6 | 6^{7} | 6
WC | (Canada) E Bouchard | 0 | 7^{9} | 4
WC | (Colombia) E Arango | 4 | 3
7 | (Spain) S Sorribes Tormo | 6 | 6

Quarterfinals
(Slovenia) T Zidanšek | 3 | 6 | 2
(United States) P Stearns | 6 | 2 | 6
4 | K Rakhimova | 6 | 7
7 | (Spain) S Sorribes Tormo | 4 | 5

Semifinals
(United States) P Stearns | 3 | 6 | 6
4 | K Rakhimova | 6 | 2 | 2

=== Bottom half ===
First round
6 | (Brazil) L Pigossi | 6 | 6
WC | (Colombia) A Samudio | 1 | 0
(Spain) M Bassols Ribera | 6^{1} | 5
Q | (Serbia) N Stevanović | 7^{7} | 7
(Canada) C Zhao | 4 | 7 | 7^{8}
(Argentina) ML Carlé | 6 | 5 | 6^{6}
PR | (United Kingdom) F Jones | 7^{7} | 6
3 | (Spain) N Párrizas Díaz | 6^{3} | 1
8 | (Argentina) N Podoroska | 4 | 6^{4}
Q | (Austria) S Kraus | 6 | 7^{7}
(Greece) D Papamichail | 2 | 2
Q | (Italy) N Brancaccio | 6 | 6
Q | (Brazil) C Alves | 4 | 7^{7} | 6
(Ukraine) D Yastremska | 6 | 6^{5} | 2
(United States) K Scott | 1 | 4
2 | (Germany) T Maria | 6 | 6

Second round
6 | (Brazil) L Pigossi | 7 | 5 | 6
Q | (Serbia) N Stevanović | 5 | 7 | 4
(Canada) C Zhao | 2 | 1
PR | (United Kingdom) F Jones | 6 | 6
Q | (Austria) S Kraus | 2 | 2
Q | (Italy) N Brancaccio | 6 | 6
Q | (Brazil) C Alves | 2 | 4
2 | (Germany) T Maria | 6 | 6

Quarterfinals
6 | (Brazil) L Pigossi | 4 | 2
PR | (United Kingdom) F Jones | 6 | 6
Q | (Italy) N Brancaccio | 3 | 2
2 | (Germany) T Maria | 6 | 6

Semifinals
PR | (United Kingdom) F Jones | 3 | 4
2 | (Germany) T Maria | 6 | 6

== Qualifying ==
=== Seeds ===
1. (Canada) Carol Zhao (moved to main draw)
2. (Mexico) Fernanda Contreras (qualifying competition)
3. (Switzerland) Joanne Züger (qualifying competition)
4. (Spain) Rosa Vicens Mas (qualified)
5. (Austria) Sinja Kraus (qualified)
6. (France) Carole Monnet (qualifying competition)
7. (Romania) Irina Bara (first round)
8. (Turkey) İpek Öz (first round)
9. (France) Harmony Tan (qualified)
10. (Romania) Jaqueline Cristian (first round)
11. (Italy) Nuria Brancaccio (qualified)
12. (Slovenia) Dalila Jakupović (qualifying competition)

=== Qualifiers ===
1. (Serbia) Natalija Stevanović
2. (Italy) Nuria Brancaccio
3. (Brazil) Carolina Alves
4. (Spain) Rosa Vicens Mas
5. (Austria) Sinja Kraus
6. (France) Harmony Tan

=== Qualifying draw ===
==== First qualifier ====
First round
Alt | Mariia Tkacheva | 3 | 0
Irina Khromacheva | 6 | 6
(Serbia) Natalija Stevanović | 6 | 6
8 | (Turkey) İpek Öz | 4 | 1

Qualifying competition
Irina Khromacheva | 6 | 4 | 6^{5}
(Serbia) Natalija Stevanović | 2 | 6 | 7^{7}

==== Second qualifier ====
First round
2 | (Mexico) Fernanda Contreras | 6 | 6
(Italy) Martina Colmegna | 1 | 3
WC | (Colombia) Valentina Mediorreal | 0 | 2
11 | (Italy) Nuria Brancaccio | 6 | 6

Qualifying competition
2 | (Mexico) Fernanda Contreras | 2 | 7^{7} | 2
11 | (Italy) Nuria Brancaccio | 6 | 6^{1} | 6

==== Third qualifier ====
First round
3 | (Switzerland) Joanne Züger | 6 | 6
WC | (Colombia) María Paz Ospina | 2 | 1
(Brazil) Carolina Alves | 1 | 6 | 6
7 | (Romania) Irina Bara | 6 | 3 | 2

Qualifying competition
3 | (Switzerland) Joanne Züger | 6^{3} | 1
(Brazil) Carolina Alves | 7^{7} | 6

==== Fourth qualifier ====
First round
4 | (Spain) Rosa Vicens Mas | 4 | 6 | 6
(Bosnia and Herzegovina) Nefisa Berberović | 6 | 3 | 2
Iryna Shymanovich | 6 | 6
10 | (Romania) Jaqueline Cristian | 1 | 3

Qualifying competition
4 | (Spain) Rosa Vicens Mas | 6 | 1 | 6
Iryna Shymanovich | 1 | 6 | 3

==== Fifth qualifier ====
First round
5 | (Austria) Sinja Kraus | 6 | 3 | 6
(Germany) Lena Papadakis | 4 | 6 | 2
(Liechtenstein) Kathinka von Deichmann | 7^{7} | 3 | 4
12 | (Slovenia) Dalila Jakupović | 6^{1} | 6 | 6

Qualifying competition
5 | (Austria) Sinja Kraus | 6 | 6
12 | (Slovenia) Dalila Jakupović | 2 | 2

==== Sixth qualifier ====
First round
6 | (France) Carole Monnet | 6 | 7
WC | (Colombia) María Torres Murcia | 1 | 5
WC | (Mexico) Maria Fernanda Navarro Oliva | 1 | 4
9 | (France) Harmony Tan | 6 | 6

Qualifying competition
6 | (France) Carole Monnet | 4 | 1
9 | (France) Harmony Tan | 6 | 6
