= 2026 Copa Colsanitas – Singles =

Singles
- 2026 Copa Colsanitas

Final
- Champion: (Czech Republic) Marie Bouzková
- Runner-up: (Hungary) Panna Udvardy
- Score: 6–7^{(7–9)}, 6–2, 6–2

Details
- Draw: 32 (6 Q / 4 WC)
- Seeds: 8

Events
Singles	Doubles
- Copa Colsanitas

Marie Bouzková defeated Panna Udvardy in the final, 6–7^{(7–9)}, 6–2, 6–2 to win the singles tennis title at the 2026 Copa Colsanitas. It was her third WTA Tour singles title.

Camila Osorio was the two-time defending champion, but lost in the second round to qualifier Jazmín Ortenzi. Osorio and Tatjana Maria's losses in the second round guaranteed a new champion at the event for the first time since 2019.

== Seeds ==
1. (Czech Republic) Marie Bouzková (champion)
2. (Spain) Jéssica Bouzas Maneiro (second round)
3. (Colombia) Camila Osorio (second round)
4. (Germany) Tatjana Maria (second round)
5. (Germany) Ella Seidel (first round)
6. Anna Blinkova (second round)
7. (United Kingdom) Francesca Jones (first round)
8. (Hungary) Panna Udvardy (final)

== Draw ==
Key

- Q = Qualifier
- WC = Wild card
- LL = Lucky loser
- Alt = Alternate
- ITF = ITF entry
- PR = Protected ranking
- SR = Special ranking
- SE = Special exempt
- JE = Junior exempt
- JR = Junior Accelerator Programme entrant
- CO = College Accelerator Programme entrant
- NG = Next Gen Accelerator Program entrant
- w/o = Walkover
- r = Retired
- d = Defaulted

=== Finals ===
Semifinals
1	(Czech Republic) Marie Bouzková	7^{7}	6
Q	(Argentina) Jazmín Ortenzi	6^{5}	2
8	(Hungary) Panna Udvardy	6^{6}	6	7^{7}
(Colombia) Emiliana Arango	7^{8}	3	6^{5}

Final
1	(Czech Republic) Marie Bouzková	6^{7}	6	6
8	(Hungary) Panna Udvardy	7^{9}	2	2

=== Top half ===
First round
1	(Czech Republic) M Bouzková	6	6
Q	(Mexico) AS Sánchez	0	2
(Belgium) H Vandewinkel	6	2	6
(Belgium) S Costoulas	3	6	3
Q	A Tikhonova	3	1
(Greece) D Papamichail	6	6
(Latvia) D Semeņistaja	6	6
5	(Germany) E Seidel	2	2
3	(Colombia) C Osorio	6^{5}	6	6
(United States) C Dolehide	7^{7}	2	1
Q	(Spain) I Burillo	1	4
Q	(Argentina) J Ortenzi	6	6
Q	(France) S Janicijevic	6^{5}	1
WC	(Argentina) J Riera	7^{7}	6
PR	(United States) R Montgomery	2	3
6	A Blinkova	6	6

Second round
1	(Czech Republic) M Bouzková	6	0
(Belgium) H Vandewinkel	4	0^{r}
(Greece) D Papamichail	1	6	2
(Latvia) D Semeņistaja	6	1	6
3	(Colombia) C Osorio	6^{4}	6^{5}
Q	(Argentina) J Ortenzi	7^{7}	7^{7}
WC	(Argentina) J Riera	0	6	6
6	A Blinkova	6	2	1

Quarterfinals
1	(Czech Republic) M Bouzková	6	7
(Latvia) D Semeņistaja	1	5
Q	(Argentina) J Ortenzi	6^{5}	6	6
WC	(Argentina) J Riera	7^{7}	3	2

Semifinals
1	(Czech Republic) M Bouzková	7^{7}	6
Q	(Argentina) J Ortenzi	6^{5}	2

=== Bottom half ===
First round
8	(Hungary) P Udvardy	6	1	6
WC	(Colombia) M Torres Murcia	1	6	0
(United States) E Mandlik	3	3
WC	(United States) J Pareja	6	6
(France) C Monnet	1	0
(Poland) K Kawa	6	6
WC	(Colombia) V Mediorreal	2	1
4	(Germany) T Maria	6	6
7	(United Kingdom) F Jones	1	1
(Spain) G Maristany	6	6
(Colombia) E Arango	1	6	6
(Argentina) ML Carlé	6	2	0
Q	(Bulgaria) L Karatancheva	6	3
(United States) V Lepchenko	3	6	6
(France) T Rakotomanga Rajaonah	2	2
2	(Spain) J Bouzas Maneiro	6	6

Second round
8	(Hungary) P Udvardy	6	2	6
WC	(United States) J Pareja	0	6	1
(Poland) K Kawa	6	6
4	(Germany) T Maria	3	3
(Spain) G Maristany	5	2
(Colombia) E Arango	7	6
(United States) V Lepchenko	6	2	7
2	(Spain) J Bouzas Maneiro	0	6	5

Quarterfinals
8	(Hungary) P Udvardy	7^{7}	6
(Poland) K Kawa	6^{2}	1
(Colombia) E Arango	6	6
(United States) V Lepchenko	4	3

Semifinals
8	(Hungary) P Udvardy	6^{6}	6	7^{7}
(Colombia) E Arango	7^{8}	3	6^{5}

== Qualifying ==
=== Seeds ===
1. (Canada) Cadence Brace (withdrew)
2. (Mexico) Ana Sofía Sánchez (qualified)
3. (Spain) Marina Bassols Ribera (qualifying competition)
4. (Brazil) Laura Pigossi (first round)
5. (Spain) Irene Burillo (qualified)
6. (Argentina) Jazmín Ortenzi (qualified)
7. (Germany) Caroline Werner (qualifying competition)
8. (France) Séléna Janicijevic (qualified)
9. Anastasia Tikhonova (qualified)
10. (Japan) Sara Saito (first round)
11. Alisa Oktiabreva (qualifying competition, withdrew)
12. (Bulgaria) Lia Karatancheva (qualified)

=== Qualifiers ===
1. (Bulgaria) Lia Karatancheva
2. (Mexico) Ana Sofía Sánchez
3. Anastasia Tikhonova
4. (France) Séléna Janicijevic
5. (Spain) Irene Burillo
6. (Argentina) Jazmín Ortenzi

=== Qualifying draw ===
==== First qualifier ====
First round
Alt	(Italy) Miriana Tona	6	1	6
(Turkey) Berfu Cengiz	3	6	4
PR	(Canada) Carol Zhao	1	4
12	(Bulgaria) Lia Karatancheva	6	6

Qualifying competition
Alt	(Italy) Miriana Tona	1	2
12	(Bulgaria) Lia Karatancheva	6	6

==== Second qualifier ====
First round
2	(Mexico) Ana Sofía Sánchez	6	2	7
(Brazil) Gabriela Cé	3	6	5
(United States) Lea Ma	4	6^{5}
11	Alisa Oktiabreva	6	7^{7}

Qualifying competition
2	(Mexico) Ana Sofía Sánchez	w/o
11	Alisa Oktiabreva

==== Third qualifier ====
First round
3	(Spain) Marina Bassols Ribera	6	6
(Spain) Alicia Herrero Liñana	3	3
WC	(Colombia) Emanuela Lares	4	1
9	Anastasia Tikhonova	6	6

Qualifying competition
3	(Spain) Marina Bassols Ribera	1	6	3
9	Anastasia Tikhonova	6	4	6

==== Fourth qualifier ====
First round
4	(Brazil) Laura Pigossi	7	1	3
(Ukraine) Katarina Zavatska	5	6	6
(Chinese Taipei) Liang En-shuo	4	5
8	(France) Séléna Janicijevic	6	7

Qualifying competition
(Ukraine) Katarina Zavatska	2	5
8	(France) Séléna Janicijevic	6	7

==== Fifth qualifier ====
First round
5	(Spain) Irene Burillo	4	6	6
WC	(Colombia) Mariana Higuita	6	1	0
WC	(Colombia) Laura Valentina Villamil Arias	0	1
7	(Germany) Caroline Werner	6	6

Qualifying competition
5	(Spain) Irene Burillo	7^{8}	2	6
7	(Germany) Caroline Werner	6^{6}	6	4

==== Sixth qualifier ====
First round
6	(Argentina) Jazmín Ortenzi	6	6
WC	(Colombia) Sara Alejandra Lozano Avellaneda	2	0
(Armenia) Elina Avanesyan	7	6
10	(Japan) Sara Saito	5	2

Qualifying competition
6	(Argentina) Jazmín Ortenzi	6	6
(Armenia) Elina Avanesyan	1	3
