= Alexandra Panova =

Russian tennis player (born 1989)

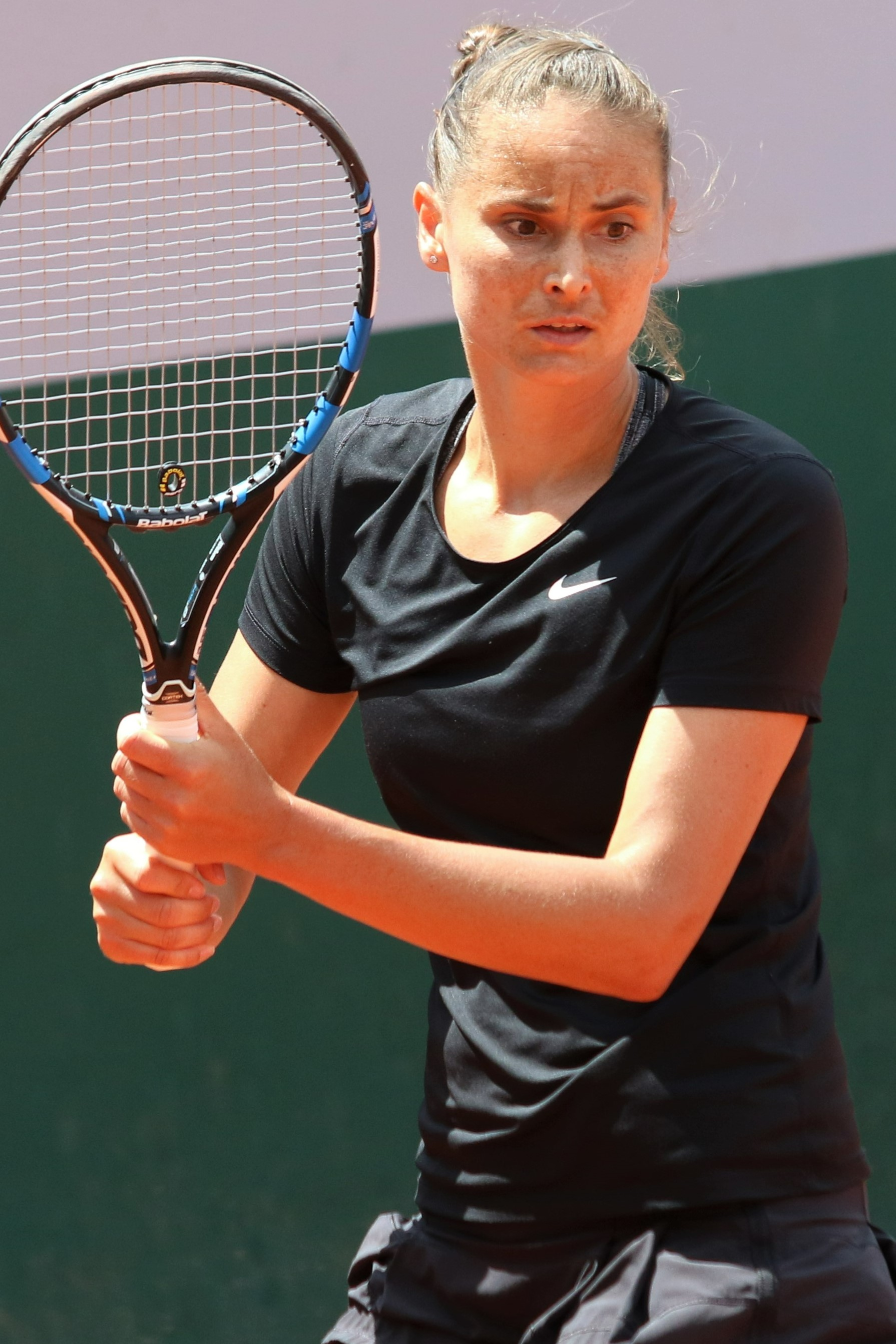
- Panova at the 2022 French Open
- Native name: Александра Панова
- Country (sports): Russia
- Born: 2 March 1989 (age 37) Krasnodar, Russian SFSR, Soviet Union
- Height: 1.79 m (5 ft 10 in)
- Plays: Right (two-handed backhand)
- Prize money: US$ 2,620,817

Singles
- Career record: 391–297
- Career titles: 0
- Highest ranking: No. 71 (30 July 2012)

Grand Slam singles results
- Australian Open: 2R (2015)
- French Open: 1R (2012)
- Wimbledon: 1R (2012)
- US Open: 1R (2011, 2012, 2015)

Doubles
- Career record: 384–324
- Career titles: 11
- Highest ranking: No. 19 (13 October 2025)
- Current ranking: No. 45 (9 November 2026)

Grand Slam doubles results
- Australian Open: QF (2024)
- French Open: QF (2024)
- Wimbledon: 2R (2015, 2016, 2023, 2025, 2026)
- US Open: 2R (2012, 2015, 2023, 2024, 2025, 2026)

Grand Slam mixed doubles results
- Australian Open: 2R (2025)
- French Open: 2R (2026)
- Wimbledon: 2R (2024, 2025)
- US Open: 1R (2024)

Team competitions
- Fed Cup: 0–1
- Last updated on: 11 November 2026.

Alexandra Alexandrovna Panova (Russian: Александра Александровна Панова; born 2 March 1989) is a Russian professional tennis player who specializes in doubles. She has a career-high doubles ranking by the WTA of No. 19, achieved on 13 October 2025. On 30 July 2012, she peaked at No. 71 in the singles rankings.

She has won 11 doubles titles on the WTA Tour. On the ITF Women's Circuit, she won two of her 16 doubles titles with her elder sister, Olga Panova.

== Career ==
=== 2009 ===
In January, Panova obtained an invitation from the Hong Kong Tennis Patrons' Association to play JB Group Classic with her compatriot Anna Chakvetadze (she replaced Maria Sharapova for injury) and Vera Zvonareva, and then she entered the Australian Open women's qualifying singles unseeded and made it to the qualifying third round, before losing to unseeded Julia Schruff of Germany, in two sets.

=== 2010–2013: Major debut, three WTA 250 doubles titles ===
In August, Panova made her Grand Slam tournament debut at the 2011 US Open by coming through qualifying. In the first round, she faced eighth seed Marion Bartoli, a match that she ended up losing in straight sets.

In February 2012, Panova made it to her first WTA Tour final at the Copa Colsanitas, upsetting fifth seed Gisela Dulko along the way. She lost to Lara Arruabarrena in the singles final, but won her first career title in doubles. She later won her second doubles title of the year at the Morocco Open.

At the US Open, Panova faced then-world No. 1 and eventual runner-up, Victoria Azarenka, in the first round and was heavily defeated, winning just one game.

Panova participated in the Fed Cup final against Italy. She lost a marathon match against Roberta Vinci in the first rubber. Panova squandered a 7–5, 5–2, 40–15 lead. Italy went on to win the Fed Cup tie 3–0.

=== 2014: New partnership with Gasparyan ===
Panova started her 2014 season at the Brisbane International getting past qualifying. However, she lost her first-round match to 2012 champion, Kaia Kanepi. At the Australian Open, Panova was defeated in the second round of qualifying by Stéphanie Dubois.

Panova won her fourth Tour doubles title at the Baku Cup, partnering with British Heather Watson. In the final they crushed Raluca Olaru and Shahar Pe'er.

With Margarita Gasparyan as her doubles partner, Panova reached the final of the Tashkent Open losing to the pair Krunić/Siniaková. This was the first WTA Tour final in her career.

=== 2015–2018: First major win, three more career doubles titles ===
Panova entered the main draw at the 2015 Australian Open through qualifying. She won her first ever match at a major tournament by beating Sorana Cîrstea in the first round. Against fellow Russian Maria Sharapova in the second, she lost in three sets, after having two match points on her serve.

Panova started the 2016 season losing in qualifying at Brisbane, the Australian Open and St. Petersburg. She recorded her first main-draw entry at the Malaysian Open, losing there in the first round. She renewed herself in Bogotá, where she had been traditionally playing well. There, Panova defeated top-seeded Elina Svitolina, saving five match points in the third set, after being 3–6 behind.

=== 2024: First two major quarterfinals ===
As an unseeded pair, partnering with Cristina Bucșa, Panova made her first major quarterfinal at the Australian Open defeating eighth-seeded Beatriz Haddad Maia and Taylor Townsend, before losing to fourth seeds Gabriela Dabrowski and Erin Routliffe, in straight sets.

She also reached the quarterfinals at the French Open for the first time, this time with Giuliana Olmos, with an upset over fourth seeds Barbora Krejčíková and Laura Siegemund.

Partnering with Yana Sizikova, Panova won the Palermo Ladies Open defeating Yvonne Cavallé Reimers and Aurora Zantedeschi.

Alongside Giuliana Olmos, Panova was runner-up at the Monterrey Open losing to Guo Hanyu and Monica Niculescu in the final.

=== 2025: Two WTA 500 titles and WTA 1000 final, top 20 ===
Partnering with Guo Hanyu, Panova won the doubles title at the Adelaide International, defeating Haddad Maia and Siegemund in the final, in straight sets. They were also title winners at the Bad Homburg Open, overcoming Lyudmyla Kichenok and Ellen Perez in a final that went to a deciding champions tiebreak.

Panova and Guo finished runner-ups at the WTA 1000 Cincinnati Open, losing the championship match to second seeds Gabriela Dabrowski and Erin Routliffe.

== Performance timelines ==
Key
W	F	SF	QF	#R	RR	Q#	P#	DNQ	A	Z#	PO	G	S	B	NMS	NTI	P	NH

(W) winner; (F) finalist; (SF) semifinalist; (QF) quarterfinalist; (#R) rounds 4, 3, 2, 1; (RR) round-robin stage; (Q#) qualification round; (P#) preliminary round; (DNQ) did not qualify; (A) absent; (Z#) Davis/Fed Cup Zonal Group (with number indication) or (PO) play-off; (G) gold, (S) silver or (B) bronze Olympic/Paralympic medal; (NMS) not a Masters tournament; (NTI) not a Tier I tournament; (P) postponed; (NH) not held; (SR) strike rate (events won / competed); (W–L) win–loss record.
To avoid confusion and double counting, these charts are updated at the conclusion of a tournament or when the player's participation has ended.

Only main-draw results in WTA Tour, Grand Slam tournaments, Fed Cup/Billie Jean King Cup and Olympic Games are included in win–loss records.

=== Singles ===
Tournament	2008	2009	2010	2011	2012	2013	2014	2015	2016	2017	SR	W–L
Grand Slam tournaments
Australian Open	A	Q3	Q1	Q1	Q3	1R	Q2	2R	Q2	A	0 / 2	1–2
French Open	A	Q2	Q1	Q1	1R	Q2	Q2	Q1	A	Q2	0 / 1	0–1
Wimbledon	A	A	Q1	Q1	1R	Q1	Q1	Q2	Q2	A	0 / 1	0–1
US Open	Q1	Q1	Q3	1R	1R	Q3	Q3	1R	Q2	Q1	0 / 3	0–3
Win–Loss	0–0	0–0	0–0	0–1	0–3	0–1	0–0	1–2	0–0	0–0	0 / 7	1–7
WTA 1000 tournaments
Dubai / Qatar Open (Note: The first Premier 5 event of the year has switched back and forth between the Dubai Tennis Championships and the Qatar Ladies Open since 2009 until 2024. Dubai was classified as a Premier 5 event from 2009 to 2011 before being succeeded by Doha for the 2012–2014 period. In 2015, Dubai regained its Premier 5 status while Doha was demoted to Premier status. The two tournaments have since alternated status every year.)	A	A	A	A	A	A	Q1	Q1	A	A	0 / 0	0–0
Indian Wells Open	A	A	A	A	1R	Q1	A	Q1	A	A	0 / 1	0–1
Miami Open	A	A	A	A	Q1	A	A	Q1	A	A	0 / 0	0–0
Madrid Open	A	A	A	Q1	A	A	A	A	A	A	0 / 0	0–0
Career statistics
Tournaments	2	3	5	3	17	6	6	7	2	0	Career total: 51	
Titles	0	0	0	0	0	0	0	0	0	0	Career total: 0	
Finals	0	0	0	0	1	0	0	0	0	0	Career total: 1	
Overall win–loss	1–2	4–3	3–5	0–3	12–17	1–7	4–6	5–7	2–2	0–0	0 / 51	32–52
Year-end ranking	191	140	127	117	71	93	122	119	133	233	$2,620,817	

=== Doubles ===
Current through the 2025 China Open.

Tournament	2008	2009	2010	2011	2012	2013	2014	2015	2016	2017	2018	2019	2020	2021	2022	2023	2024	2025	2026	SR	W–L	Win%
Grand Slam tournaments
Australian Open	A	A	A	A	1R	2R	1R	2R	2R	A	A	1R	A	A	A	1R	QF	3R	1R	0 / 10	8–10	44%
French Open	A	A	A	1R	2R	1R	3R	2R	1R	2R	A	A	A	1R	1R	1R	QF	1R	1R	0 / 13	8–13	38%
Wimbledon	A	A	A	1R	1R	1R	Q1	2R	2R	1R	A	1R	NH	A	A (Note: Suspended due to the Russian invasion of Ukraine.)	2R	1R	2R	2R	0 / 11	5–11	31%
US Open	A	A	A	2R	2R	1R	1R	2R	1R	A	A	A	A	A	1R	2R	2R	2R	2R	0 / 11	7–11	39%
Win–Loss	0–0	0–0	0–0	1–3	2–4	1–4	2–3	4–4	2–4	1–2	0–0	0–2	0–0	0–1	0–2	2–4	7–4	4–4	2–4	0 / 45	28–45	38%
WTA 1000 tournaments
Qatar Open	A	Not Tier I			A	A	1R	NT1	A	NT1	A	NT1	A	NT1	2R	NT1	1R	QF	2R	0 / 5	4–5	44%
Dubai Championships	NT1	A	A	A	Not Tier 1			QF	NT1	A	NT1	A	NT1	1R	NT1	1R	1R	QF	2R	0 / 6	4–6	40%
Indian Wells Open	A	A	A	A	A	QF	A	2R	A	A	A	A	NH	1R	A	2R	1R	1R	2R	0 / 7	5–7	42%
Miami Open	A	A	A	A	1R	A	A	QF	A	A	A	2R	NH	A	1R	A	1R	1R	1R	0 / 7	3–7	30%
Madrid Open	A	A	A	A	A	A	A	2R	A	A	A	1R	NH	A	2R	2R	1R	1R	1R	0 / 7	3–7	30%
Italian Open	A	A	A	A	A	A	A	2R	A	A	A	1R	A	A	1R	2R	QF	1R	2R	0 / 7	5–7	42%
Canadian Open	A	A	A	A	A	A	A	A	A	A	A	A	A	A	A	A	A	QF	1R	0 / 2	2–2	50%
Cincinnati Open	NT1	A	A	A	A	A	A	A	A	A	A	A	A	A	A	A	1R	F	F	0 / 3	7–3	70%
China Open	NT1	A	A	A	A	A	A	A	A	A	A	A	Not held			1R	2R	1R	1R	0 / 4	1–4	20%
Wuhan Open	A	A	A	A	A	A	A	A	A	A	A	A	Not held				1R	2R	1R	0 / 3	1–3	25%
Win–Loss	0–0	0–0	0–0	0–0	0–1	2–1	0–1	7–5	0–0	0–0	0–0	1–3	0–0	0–2	2–4	3–5	3–9	9–10	8–10	0 / 51	35–51	41%
Career statistics
	2008	2009	2010	2011	2012	2013	2014	2015	2016	2017	2018	2019	2020	2021	2022	2023	2024	2025	2026	SR	W–L	Win%
Tournaments	1	0	5	11	11	13	15	17	12	3	5	14	0	17	17	5				Career total: 146		
Titles	0	0	1	0	2	0	1	2	0	0	1	0	0	0	0	0				Career total: 7		
Finals	0	0	1	0	2	2	2	2	1	0	2	0	0	0	1	1				Career total: 14		
Overall win–loss	1–1	0–1	6–4	5–11	14–9	13–13	16–14	20–15	10–12	1–3	9–4	5–13	0–0	13–17	14–17	4–5				7 / 146	131–139	49%
Year-end ranking	226	201	106	88	64	66	53	40	89	312	91	162	-	116	59	61	30	20				

== WTA Tour finals ==
=== Singles: 1 (runner-up) ===
Legend
International (0–1)

Result	Date	Tournament	Tier	Surface	Opponent	Score
Loss	Feb 2012	Copa Colsanitas, Colombia	International	Clay	(Spain) Lara Arruabarrena-Vecino	2–6, 5–7

=== Doubles: 24 (11 titles, 13 runner-ups) ===
Legend
WTA 1000 (0–2)
Premier / WTA 500 (3–2)
International / WTA 250 (8–9)

Result	W–L	Date	Tournament	Tier	Surface	Partner	Opponents	Score
Win	1–0	Sep 2010	Tashkent Open, Uzbekistan	International	Hard	(Belarus) Tatiana Poutchek	(Romania) Alexandra Dulgheru (Slovakia) Magdaléna Rybáriková	6–3, 6–4
Win	2–0	Feb 2012	Copa Colsanitas, Colombia	International	Clay	(Czech Republic) Eva Birnerová	(Luxembourg) Mandy Minella (Switzerland) Stefanie Vögele	6–2, 6–2
Win	3–0	Apr 2012	Rabat Grand Prix, Morocco	International	Clay	(Czech Republic) Petra Cetkovská	(Romania) Irina-Camelia Begu (Romania) Alexandra Cadanțu	3–6, 7–6^{(7–5)}, [11–9]
Loss	3–1	Feb 2013	Pattaya Open, Thailand	International	Hard	(Uzbekistan) Akgul Amanmuradova	(Japan) Kimiko Date-Krumm (Australia) Casey Dellacqua	3–6, 2–6
Loss	3–2	Feb 2013	Copa Colsanitas, Colombia	International	Clay	(Czech Republic) Eva Birnerová	(Hungary) Tímea Babos (Luxembourg) Mandy Minella	4–6, 3–6
Win	4–2	Jul 2014	Baku Cup, Azerbaijan	International	Hard	(United Kingdom) Heather Watson	(Romania) Raluca Olaru (Israel) Shahar Pe'er	6–2, 7–6^{(7–3)}
Loss	4–3	Sep 2014	Tashkent Open, Uzbekistan	International	Hard	(Russia) Margarita Gasparyan	(Serbia) Aleksandra Krunić (Czech Republic) Kateřina Siniaková	2–6, 1–6
Win	5–3	Aug 2015	Baku Cup, Azerbaijan (2)	International	Hard	(Russia) Margarita Gasparyan	(Russia) Vitalia Diatchenko (Ukraine) Olga Savchuk	6–3, 7–5
Win	6–3	Oct 2015	Tashkent Open, Uzbekistan (2)	International	Hard	(Russia) Margarita Gasparyan	(Russia) Vera Dushevina (Czech Republic) Kateřina Siniaková	6–1, 3–6, [10–3]
Loss	6–4	Sep 2016	Tournoi de Québec, Canada	International	Carpet (i)	(Russia) Alla Kudryavtseva	(Czech Republic) Andrea Hlaváčková (Czech Republic) Lucie Hradecká	6–7^{(2–7)}, 6–7^{(2–7)}
Loss	6–5	Jul 2018	Moscow River Cup, Russia	International	Clay	(Kazakhstan) Galina Voskoboeva	(Russia) Anastasia Potapova (Russia) Vera Zvonareva	0–6, 3–6
Win	7–5	Oct 2018	Kremlin Cup, Russia	Premier	Hard (i)	(Germany) Laura Siegemund	(Croatia) Darija Jurak (Romania) Raluca Olaru	6–2, 7–6^{(7–2)}
Loss	7–6	May 2022	Rabat Grand Prix, Morocco	WTA 250	Clay	(Romania) Monica Niculescu	(Japan) Eri Hozumi (Japan) Makoto Ninomiya	7–6^{(9–7)}, 3–6, [8–10]
Loss	7–7	Feb 2023	Lyon Open, France	WTA 250	Hard (i)	(Serbia) Olga Danilović	(Spain) Cristina Bucșa (Netherlands) Bibiane Schoofs	6–7^{(5–7)}, 3–6
Win	8–7	Jul 2023	Hamburg Open, Germany	WTA 250	Clay	(Kazakhstan) Anna Danilina	(Czech Republic) Miriam Kolodziejová (United States) Angela Kulikov	6–4, 6–2
Win	9–7	Jul 2024	Palermo Ladies Open, Italy	WTA 250	Clay	Yana Sizikova	(Spain) Yvonne Cavallé Reimers (Italy) Aurora Zantedeschi	4–6, 6–3, [10–5]
Loss	9–8	Jul 2024	Iași Open, Romania	WTA 250	Clay	Yana Sizikova	(Kazakhstan) Anna Danilina; Irina Khromacheva	4–6, 2–6
Loss	9–9	Aug 2024	Monterrey Open, Mexico	WTA 500	Hard	(Mexico) Giuliana Olmos	(China) Guo Hanyu (Romania) Monica Niculescu	7–5, 6–4
Win	10–9	Jan 2025	Adelaide International, Australia	WTA 500	Hard	(China) Guo Hanyu	(Brazil) Beatriz Haddad Maia (Germany) Laura Siegemund	7–5, 6–4
Win	11–9	Jun 2025	Bad Homburg Open, Germany	WTA 500	Grass	(China) Guo Hanyu	(Ukraine) Lyudmyla Kichenok (Australia) Ellen Perez	4−6, 7−6^{(7−4)}, [10−5]
Loss	11–10	Aug 2025	Cincinnati Open, United States	WTA 1000	Hard	(China) Guo Hanyu	(Canada) Gabriela Dabrowski (New Zealand) Erin Routliffe	4–6, 3–6
Loss	11–11	Aug 2025	Monterrey Open, Mexico	WTA 500	Hard	(China) Guo Hanyu	(Spain) Cristina Bucșa (United States) Nicole Melichar-Martinez	2–6, 0–6
Loss	11–12	Jul 2026	Hamburg Open, Germany	WTA 250	Clay	(Belgium) Magali Kempen	(Slovenia) Dalila Jakupović (Slovenia) Nika Radišić	7–5, 3–6, [5–10]
Loss	11–13	Aug 2026	Cincinnati Open, United States	WTA 1000	Hard	(Belgium) Magali Kempen	(Czech Republic) Marie Bouzková (Czech Republic) Linda Nosková	1–6, 2–6

== WTA 125 finals ==
=== Doubles: 4 (4 runner-ups) ===
Result	W–L	Date	Tournament	Surface	Partner	Opponents	Score
Loss	0–1	Jun 2022	Internacional de Valencia, Spain	Clay	(Netherlands) Arantxa Rus	(Spain) Aliona Bolsova (Spain) Rebeka Masarova	0–6, 3–6
Loss	0–2	Jul 2022	Contrexéville Open, France	Clay	(China) Han Xinyun	(Norway) Ulrikke Eikeri (Slovakia) Tereza Mihalíková	6–7^{(8–10)}, 2–6
Loss	0–3	Aug 2023	Chicago Challenger, United States	Hard	(Spain) Cristina Bucșa	(Norway) Ulrikke Eikeri (Estonia) Ingrid Neel	w/o
Loss	0–4	Dec 2023	Open Angers, France	Hard (i)	(Kazakhstan) Anna Danilina	(Spain) Cristina Bucșa (Romania) Monica Niculescu	1–6, 3–6

== ITF Circuit finals ==
Legend
$100,000 tournaments
$75/80,000 tournaments
$50/60,000 tournaments
$25,000 tournaments
$10/15,000 tournaments

=== Singles: 15 (8 titles, 7 runner-ups) ===
Result	W–L	Date	Tournament	Tier	Surface	Opponent	Score
Win	1–0	May 2005	ITF Kyiv, Ukraine	10,000	Clay	(Ukraine) Oxana Lyubtsova	3–6, 7–6^{(4)}, 2–0 ret.
Loss	1–1	Sep 2006	ITF Mytilini, Greece	10,000	Hard	(Greece) Anna Gerasimou	4–6, 4–6
Win	2–1	Oct 2006	ITF Thessaloniki, Greece	10,000	Clay	(Germany) Madlen Kadur	6–7^{(7)}, 6–4, 6–2
Loss	2–2	May 2008	ITF Changwon, South Korea	25,000	Hard	(China) Xie Yanze	4–6, 4–6
Loss	2–3	May 2008	Kurume Cup, Japan	50,000	Grass	(Chinese Taipei) Chang Kai-chen	5–7, 3–6
Win	3–3	Mar 2010	ITF St. Petersburg, Russia	10,000	Hard (i)	(Portugal) Neuza Silva	6–1, 7–5
Loss	3–4	Jul 2011	ITF La Coruña, Spain	25,000	Clay	(United States) Gail Brodsky	3–6, 4–6
Win	4–4	Sep 2011	Saransk Cup, Russia	50,000	Clay	(Russia) Marina Melnikova	6–0, 6–2
Win	5–4	Oct 2011	Telavi Open, Georgia	50,000	Clay	(Romania) Alexandra Cadanțu	4–6, 6–1, 6–2
Win	6–4	Sep 2013	Batumi Ladies Open, Georgia	25,000	Hard	(Ukraine) Kateryna Kozlova	6–4, 0–6, 7–5
Win	7–4	Sep 2013	Telavi Open, Georgia (2)	50,000	Clay	(Russia) Victoria Kan	7–5, 6–1
Loss	7–5	Mar 2014	ITF Campinas, Brazil	25,000	Clay	(Romania) Irina-Camelia Begu	2–6, 4–6
Loss	7–6	Mar 2014	ITF São Paulo, Brazil	25,000	Clay	(Romania) Irina-Camelia Begu	5–7, 6–4, 4–6
Loss	7–7	May 2017	ITF La Marsa, Tunisia	25,000	Clay	(France) Myrtille Georges	1–6, 1–6
Win	8–7	Apr 2018	ITF Antalya, Turkey	15,000	Clay	(Russia) Anastasia Pribylova	6–2, 7–6^{(3)}

=== Doubles: 28 (16 titles, 12 runner-ups) ===
Result	W–L	Date	Tournament	Tier	Surface	Partner	Opponents	Score
Win	1–0	Apr 2005	ITF Minsk, Belarus	10,000	Carpet (i)	(Russia) Olga Panova	(Belarus) Olga Govortsova (Ukraine) Kateryna Polunina	7–5, 6–3
Win	2–0	May 2005	ITF Kyiv, Ukraine	10,000	Clay	(Russia) Olga Panova	(Russia) Vasilisa Davydova (Russia) Kristina Movsesyan	6–2, 6–0
Win	3–0	Sep 2006	ITF Mytilini, Greece	10,000	Hard	(Slovenia) Maja Kambič	(Greece) Anna Koumantou (Turkey) İpek Şenoğlu	6–2, 6–1
Win	4–0	Sep 2006	ITF Thessaloniki, Greece	10,000	Clay	(Italy) Nicole Clerico	(Switzerland) Amra Sadiković (Switzerland) Stefanie Vögele	6–4, 7–6^{(8)}
Win	5–0	Sep 2008	ITF Rousse, Bulgaria	25,000	Clay	(Russia) Ksenia Pervak	(Russia) Vitalia Diatchenko (Russia) Eugeniya Pashkova	6–2, 6–7^{(5)}, [10–5]
Win	6–0	Mar 2009	ITF Fort Walton Beach, United States	25,000	Hard	(Belarus) Tatiana Poutchek	(Russia) Ekaterina Bychkova (Belarus) Ekaterina Dzehalevich	6–2, 6–2
Loss	6–1	Mar 2009	ITF Redding, United States	25,000	Hard	(Japan) Tomoko Yonemura	(Belarus) Anna Orlik (Slovenia) Maša Zec Peškirič	2–6, 2–6
Loss	6–2	Apr 2009	Dothan Pro Classic, United States	75,000	Clay	(Russia) Ekaterina Bychkova	(United States) Julie Ditty (United States) Carly Gullickson	6–2, 1–6, [6–10]
Loss	6–3	Mar 2010	ITF St. Petersburg, Russia	10,000	Hard (i)	(Russia) Eugeniya Pashkova	(Ukraine) Alyona Sotnikova (Ukraine) Maryna Zanevska	5–7, 3–6
Win	7–3	Apr 2010	ITF Khanty-Mansiysk, Russia	50,000	Carpet (i)	(Russia) Ksenia Pervak	(Ukraine) Lyudmyla Kichenok (Ukraine) Nadiia Kichenok	7–6^{(7)}, 2–6, [10–7]
Loss	7–4	May 2010	Fukuoka International, Japan	50,000	Carpet	(New Zealand) Marina Erakovic	(Japan) Misaki Doi (Japan) Kotomi Takahata	4–6, 4–6
Loss	7–5	Jun 2010	Maribor Open, Slovenia	50,000	Clay	(Russia) Ksenia Pervak	(Slovenia) Andreja Klepač (Slovenia) Tadeja Majerič	3–6, 6–7^{(6)}
Win	8–5	Dec 2010	Pune Championships, India	25,000	Hard	(Russia) Nina Bratchikova	(Ukraine) Anna Shkudun (Japan) Sachie Ishizu	6–3, 7–6^{(2)}
Loss	8–6	Mar 2011	ITF Moscow, Russia	25,000	Hard	(Russia) Olga Panova	(Ukraine) Lyudmyla Kichenok (Ukraine) Nadiia Kichenok	3–6, 3–6
Win	9–6	Jul 2011	Open de Biarritz, France	100,000	Clay	(Poland) Urszula Radwańska	(Japan) Erika Sema (Brazil) Roxane Vaisemberg	6–2, 6–1
Loss	9–7	Jul 2011	President's Cup, Kazakhstan	100,000	Hard	(Uzbekistan) Akgul Amanmuradova	(Russia) Vitalia Diatchenko (Kazakhstan) Galina Voskoboeva	3–6, 4–6
Loss	9–8	Aug 2011	Tatarstan Open, Russia	50,000	Hard	(Russia) Vitalia Diatchenko	(Slovenia) Andreja Klepač (Russia) Ekaterina Lopes	w/o
Loss	9–9	Mar 2012	Osprey Challenger, United States	50,000	Clay	(Ukraine) Lesia Tsurenko	(United States) Lindsay Lee-Waters (United States) Megan Moulton-Levy	6–2, 4–6, [7–10]
Win	10–9	May 2012	Open de Cagnes-sur-Mer, France	100,000	Clay	(Poland) Urszula Radwańska	(Hungary) Katalin Marosi (Czech Republic) Renata Voráčová	7–5, 4–6, [10–6]
Loss	10–10	Jul 2013	Donetsk Cup, Ukraine	75,000	Hard	(Serbia) Vesna Dolonc	(Ukraine) Yuliya Beygelzimer (Czech Republic) Renata Voráčová	1–6, 4–6
Win	11–10	Mar 2014	ITF Campinas, Brazil	25,000	Clay	(Ukraine) Lyudmyla Kichenok	(France) Laura Thorpe (Liechtenstein) Stephanie Vogt	6–1, 6–3
Win	12–10	Mar 2014	ITF São Paulo, Brazil	25,000	Clay	(Romania) Irina-Camelia Begu	(Argentina) María Irigoyen (Bolivia) María Fernanda Álvarez Terán	6–4, 3–6, [11–9]
Win	13–10	Jun 2014	Contrexéville Open, France	100,000	Clay	(France) Laura Thorpe	(Romania) Irina-Camelia Begu (Argentina) María Irigoyen	6–3, 4–0 ret.
Win	14–10	Nov 2014	Dubai Tennis Challenge, UAE	75,000	Hard	(Russia) Vitalia Diatchenko	(Ukraine) Lyudmyla Kichenok (Ukraine) Olga Savchuk	3–6, 6–2, [10–4]
Loss	14–11	May 2016	Charlottesville Open, United States	60,000	Clay	(United States) Shelby Rogers	(United States) Asia Muhammad (United States) Taylor Townsend	6–7^{(4)}, 0–6
Win	15–11	May 2016	ITF Indian Harbour Beach, United States	75,000	Clay	(Israel) Julia Glushko	(United States) Jessica Pegula (United States) Maria Sanchez	7–5, 6–4
Loss	15–12	Jun 2018	Internazionali di Brescia, Italy	60,000	Clay	(Russia) Anastasia Pribylova	(Romania) Cristina Dinu (Ukraine) Hanna Poznikhirenko	3–6, 6–7^{(6)}
Win	16–12	Oct 2018	Internationaux de Poitiers, France	80,000	Hard (i)	(Russia) Anna Blinkova	(Switzerland) Viktorija Golubic (Netherlands) Arantxa Rus	6–1, 6–1
