= 2012 Copa Sony Ericsson Colsanitas – Doubles =

Women's tennis tournament

Doubles
- 2012 Copa Sony Ericsson Colsanitas

Final
- Champions: (Czech Republic) Eva Birnerová (Russia) Alexandra Panova
- Runners-up: (Luxembourg) Mandy Minella (Switzerland) Stefanie Vögele
- Score: 6–2, 6–2

Details
- Draw: 16
- Seeds: 4

Events
Singles	Doubles
- Copa Colsanitas

Edina Gallovits-Hall and Anabel Medina Garrigues are the defending champions, but Medina Garrigues decided to participate instead at the 2012 Qatar Ladies Open. Edina Gallovits-Hall choose to participate with Karin Knapp, but they lost in the semifinals.

Eva Birnerová and Alexandra Panova won the title, they defeated Mandy Minella and Stefanie Vögele in the final, 6–2, 6–2.

== Seeds ==
1. (Czech Republic) Eva Birnerová / (Russia) Alexandra Panova (champions)
2. (Canada) Sharon Fichman / (China) Sun Shengnan (first round)
3. (United States) Tetiana Luzhanska / (Germany) Kathrin Wörle (first round)
4. (Croatia) Maria Abramović / (Canada) Marie-Ève Pelletier (first round)

== Draw ==
Key

- Q = Qualifier
- WC = Wild card
- LL = Lucky loser
- Alt = Alternate
- ITF = ITF entry
- PR = Protected ranking
- SR = Special ranking
- SE = Special exempt
- JE = Junior exempt
- JR = Junior Accelerator Programme entrant
- CO = College Accelerator Programme entrant
- NG = Next Gen Accelerator Program entrant
- w/o = Walkover
- r = Retired
- d = Defaulted

=== Draw ===
First round
1	(Czech Republic) E Birnerová (Russia) A Panova	6	6
WC	(Colombia) K Castiblanco (Argentina) P Ormaechea	2	0
(Argentina) M Auroux (Argentina) M Irigoyen	6	6
WC	(Argentina) G Dulko (Argentina) P Suárez	4	4
4	(Croatia) M Abramović (Canada) M-È Pelletier	6	3	[3]
(Hungary) T Babos (Russia) V Savinykh	1	6	[10]
(Spain) L Arruabarrena-Vecino (Spain) E Cabeza Candela	6	6
(Romania) A Cadanțu (Romania) IR Olaru	1	4
(Spain) L Domínguez Lino (Switzerland) R Oprandi	6	6
(Brazil) MF Alves (United States) J Cohen	1	0
(Romania) E Gallovits-Hall (Italy) K Knapp	7^{12}	2	[10]
3	(United States) T Luzhanska (Germany) K Wörle	6^{10}	6	[4]
(Spain) L Costas-Moreira (Spain) I Ferrer Suárez	2	6	[5]
(Luxembourg) M Minella (Switzerland) S Vögele	6	0	[10]
(Colombia) C Castaño (Colombia) M Duque-Mariño	6	6
2	(Canada) S Fichman (China) S Sun	2	4

Quarterfinals
1	(Czech Republic) E Birnerová (Russia) A Panova	6	6
(Argentina) M Auroux (Argentina) M Irigoyen	3	4
(Hungary) T Babos (Russia) V Savinykh	6	6
(Spain) L Arruabarrena-Vecino (Spain) E Cabeza Candela	4	1
(Spain) L Domínguez Lino (Switzerland) R Oprandi
(Romania) E Gallovits-Hall (Italy) K Knapp	w/o
(Luxembourg) M Minella (Switzerland) S Vögele	4	6	[11]
(Colombia) C Castaño (Colombia) M Duque-Mariño	6	3	[9]

Semifinals
1	(Czech Republic) E Birnerová (Russia) A Panova	6	5	[12]
(Hungary) T Babos (Russia) V Savinykh	4	7	[10]
(Romania) E Gallovits-Hall (Italy) K Knapp	3	7	[6]
(Luxembourg) M Minella (Switzerland) S Vögele	6	5	[10]

Final
1	(Czech Republic) E Birnerová (Russia) A Panova	6	6
(Luxembourg) M Minella (Switzerland) S Vögele	2	2
