= 2012 Copa Sony Ericsson Colsanitas – Singles =

Singles
- 2012 Copa Sony Ericsson Colsanitas

Final
- Champion: (Spain) Lara Arruabarrena Vecino
- Runner-up: (Russia) Alexandra Panova
- Score: 6–2, 7–5

Details
- Draw: 32
- Seeds: 8

Events
Singles	Doubles
- Copa Colsanitas

Lourdes Domínguez Lino was the defending champion, but lost in the second round to Mariana Duque-Mariño.

Lara Arruabarrena Vecino won the title, defeating Alexandra Panova in the final with the score of 6–2, 7–5.

All seeded players lost in the first or second round.

== Seeds ==
1. (New Zealand) Marina Erakovic (second round)
2. (Romania) Alexandra Dulgheru (first round)
3. (Switzerland) Romina Oprandi (second round)
4. (Australia) Jelena Dokić (first round)
5. (Argentina) Gisela Dulko (second round)
6. (France) Mathilde Johansson (first round)
7. (Spain) Lourdes Domínguez Lino (second round)
8. (Austria) Patricia Mayr-Achleitner (first round)

== Draw ==
Key

- Q = Qualifier
- WC = Wild card
- LL = Lucky loser
- Alt = Alternate
- ITF = ITF entry
- PR = Protected ranking
- SR = Special ranking
- SE = Special exempt
- JE = Junior exempt
- JR = Junior Accelerator Programme entrant
- CO = College Accelerator Programme entrant
- NG = Next Gen Accelerator Program entrant
- w/o = Walkover
- r = Retired
- d = Defaulted

=== Finals ===
Semifinals
(Romania) Edina Gallovits-Hall	4	3
(Spain) Lara Arruabarrena Vecino	6	6
(Hungary) Tímea Babos	2	3
(Russia) Alexandra Panova	6	6

Final
(Spain) Lara Arruabarrena Vecino	6	7
(Russia) Alexandra Panova	2	5

=== Top half ===
First round
1	(New Zealand) M Erakovic	6	6
(Switzerland) S Vögele	3	4
(United States) J Cohen	4	1
(Romania) E Gallovits-Hall	6	6
(United States) T Luzhanska	6	4	5
(Colombia) M Duque-Mariño	3	6	7
(Canada) S Fichman	2	2
7	(Spain) L Domínguez Lino	6	6
4	(Australia) J Dokić	6	3	4
Q	(Argentina) P Ormaechea	4	6	6
WC	(Colombia) K Castiblanco	3	4
(Slovenia) P Rampre	6	6
Q	(Spain) I Ferrer Suárez	2	4
(Czech Republic) E Birnerová	6	6
(Spain) L Arruabarrena Vecino	6	3	7^{7}
8	(Austria) P Mayr-Achleitner	1	6	6^{3}

Second round
1	(New Zealand) M Erakovic	4	4
(Romania) E Gallovits-Hall	6	6
(Colombia) M Duque-Mariño	4	6	7
7	(Spain) L Domínguez Lino	6	2	5
Q	(Argentina) P Ormaechea	6	3	7^{7}
(Slovenia) P Rampre	4	6	6^{4}
(Czech Republic) E Birnerová	4	0
(Spain) L Arruabarrena Vecino	6	6

Quarterfinals
(Romania) E Gallovits-Hall	7^{7}	3	6
(Colombia) M Duque-Mariño	6^{3}	6	2
Q	(Argentina) P Ormaechea	3	0
(Spain) L Arruabarrena Vecino	6	6

Semifinals
(Romania) E Gallovits-Hall	4	3
(Spain) L Arruabarrena Vecino	6	6

=== Bottom half ===
First round
6	(France) M Johansson	6^{2}	6	5
(Russia) V Savinykh	7^{7}	3	7
(Spain) E Cabeza Candela	0	6	4
Q	(Kazakhstan) Y Shvedova	6	3	6
(Hungary) T Babos	6	6
WC	(Colombia) Y Lizarazo	0	1
(Romania) A Cadanțu	2	2
3	(Switzerland) R Oprandi	6	6
5	(Argentina) G Dulko	1	6	6
(Germany) K Wörle	6	2	4
(Russia) A Panova	4	7^{10}	6
(Luxembourg) M Minella	6	6^{8}	1
Q	(Kazakhstan) S Karatantcheva	7	0	3
WC	(Colombia) C Castaño	5	6	6
(Italy) K Knapp	6	6
2	(Romania) A Dulgheru	2	2

Second round
(Russia) V Savinykh	2	2
Q	(Kazakhstan) Y Shvedova	6	6
(Hungary) T Babos	7^{7}	6
3	(Switzerland) R Oprandi	6^{5}	4
5	(Argentina) G Dulko	5	2
(Russia) A Panova	7	6
WC	(Colombia) C Castaño	3	6	2
(Italy) K Knapp	6	2	6

Quarterfinals
Q	(Kazakhstan) Y Shvedova	4	4
(Hungary) T Babos	6	6
(Russia) A Panova	6	6
(Italy) K Knapp	4	4

Semifinals
(Hungary) T Babos	2	3
(Russia) A Panova	6	6

== Qualifying ==
=== Seeds ===
1. (Argentina) Paula Ormaechea (qualified)
2. (Kazakhstan) Sesil Karatantcheva (qualified)
3. (Puerto Rico) Monica Puig (second round)
4. (Kazakhstan) Yaroslava Shvedova (qualified)
5. (Spain) Leticia Costas-Moreira (qualifying competition)
6. (Italy) Corinna Dentoni (qualifying competition)
7. (Spain) Inés Ferrer Suárez (qualified)
8. (Slovenia) Nastja Kolar (first round)

=== Qualifiers ===
1. (Argentina) Paula Ormaechea
2. (Kazakhstan) Sesil Karatantcheva
3. (Spain) Inés Ferrer Suárez
4. (Kazakhstan) Yaroslava Shvedova

=== Draw ===
==== First qualifier ====
First round				Second round					Qualifying competition
				1	(Argentina) Paula Ormaechea	4	6	6
	(Brazil) Teliana Pereira	6	6		(Brazil) Teliana Pereira	6	2	4
	(China) Sun Shengnan	1	2						1	(Argentina) Paula Ormaechea	6	6
WC	(United States) Libby Muma	1	5						6	(Italy) Corinna Dentoni	4	1
	(Brazil) Maria Fernanda Alves	6	7		(Brazil) Maria Fernanda Alves	6^{7}	2
				6	(Italy) Corinna Dentoni	7^{9}	6

==== Second qualifier ====
First round
WC	(United States) Alexandra Riley	3	0
WC	(United Kingdom) Robyn Beddow	6	6
(Luxembourg) Anne Kremer	2	4
(Croatia) Maria Abramović	6	6
(Mexico) Ximena Hermoso	6	5	7^{7}
8	(Slovenia) Nastja Kolar	4	7	6^{4}

Second round
2	(Kazakhstan) Sesil Karatantcheva	6	6
WC	(United Kingdom) Robyn Beddow	0	1
(Croatia) Maria Abramović	3	6	6^{2}
(Mexico) Ximena Hermoso	6	2	7^{7}

Qualifying competition
2	(Kazakhstan) Sesil Karatantcheva	6	6
(Mexico) Ximena Hermoso	3	3

==== Third qualifier ====
First round				Second round					Qualifying competition
				3	(Puerto Rico) Monica Puig	3	7^{7}	3
	(Italy) Annalisa Bona	6	6		(Italy) Annalisa Bona	6	6^{5}	6
WC	(United States) June Lee (tennis)	0	3							(Italy) Annalisa Bona	4	6	0
	(Venezuela) Adriana Pérez	6^{4}	0						7	(Spain) Inés Ferrer Suárez	6	4	6
WC	(Canada) Marie-Ève Pelletier	7^{7}	6	WC	(Canada) Marie-Ève Pelletier	6	4	3
				7	(Spain) Inés Ferrer Suárez	3	6	6

==== Fourth qualifier ====
First round				Second round				Qualifying competition
				4	(Kazakhstan) Yaroslava Shvedova	6	6
WC	(Czech Republic) Hana Birnerová	1	0		(Romania) Raluca Olaru	2	3
	(Romania) Raluca Olaru	6	6					4	(Kazakhstan) Yaroslava Shvedova	6	6
	(Bulgaria) Alexandrina Naydenova	6	6					5	(Spain) Leticia Costas-Moreira	1	4
WC	(United States) Daniela Roldan	0	3		(Bulgaria) Alexandrina Naydenova	6^{4}	0
				5	(Spain) Leticia Costas-Moreira	7^{7}	6
