= Carolina Alves (tennis) =

Brazilian tennis player (born 1996)

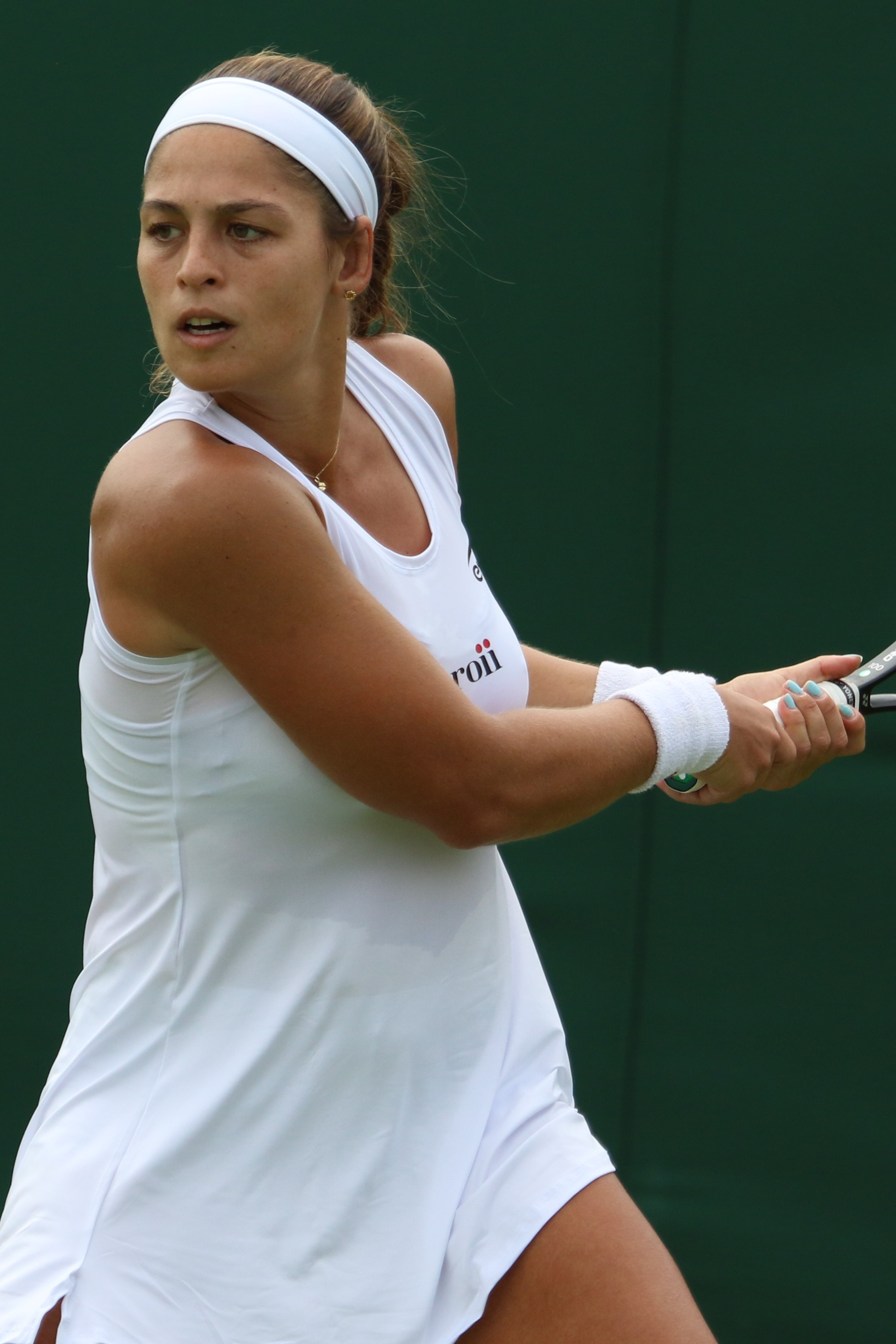
- Alves at the 2023 Wimbledon Championships
- Full name: Carolina Meligeni Rodrigues Alves
- Country (sports): Brazil
- Residence: Buenos Aires, Argentina
- Born: 23 April 1996 (age 30) Campinas, Brazil
- Height: 1.70 m (5 ft 7 in)
- Plays: Right (two-handed backhand)
- Prize money: US$ 448,795

Singles
- Career record: 449–334
- Career titles: 10 ITF
- Highest ranking: No. 165 (12 September 2022)
- Current ranking: No. 284 (4 May 2026)

Grand Slam singles results
- Australian Open: Q1 (2022, 2023)
- French Open: Q2 (2022, 2023)
- Wimbledon: Q1 (2022, 2023)
- US Open: Q2 (2022)

Doubles
- Career record: 268–189
- Career titles: 24 ITF
- Highest ranking: No. 110 (18 July 2022)
- Current ranking: No. 921 (4 May 2026)

Team competitions
- Fed Cup: 11–4
Medal record
Representing Brazil
Pan American Games
Bronze medal – third place	2019 Lima	Doubles
- Last updated on: 15 May 2026.

Carolina Meligeni Rodrigues Alves (born 23 April 1996), also known as Carol Meligeni, is a Brazilian professional tennis player. She has a career-high WTA singles ranking of No. 165, achieved on 12 September 2022 and a best doubles ranking of No. 110, achieved on 18 July 2022.

Alves has won ten singles and 24 doubles titles at ITF Circuit tournaments. She plays for Brazil Billie Jean King Cup team.

== Career ==
=== 2011 ===
Carol made her debut on 6 June against Isabella Capato Camargo, winning in straight sets, at the Tennis Club of Santos Tournament in Brazil. However, in the same tournament, she was defeated by Argentine seed Andrea Benitez in straight sets in the round of 16.

=== 2012: Doubles debut ===
Carol's first doubles appearance occurred on July 30, again in Santos, partnering with compatriot Giovanna Baccarini. They were defeated in the first round by fellow Brazilians Paula Cristina Gonçalves and Roxane Vaisemberg.

=== 2013: First ITF doubles title ===
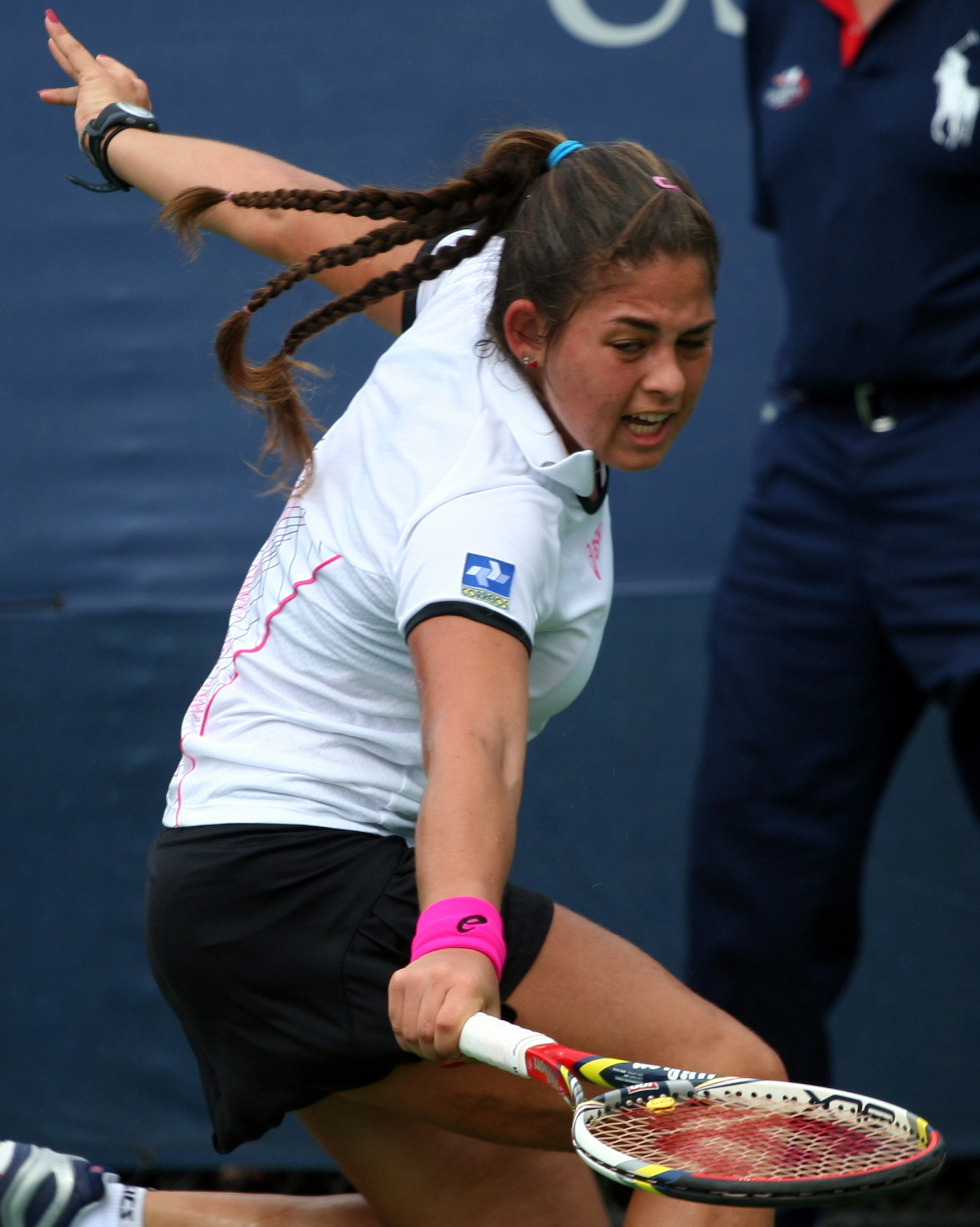
Carol at the 2013 US Open.

In 2013, Carol won her first ITF doubles title in Curitiba, Brazil, alongside Leticia Garcia Vidal.

=== 2015: WTA Tour debut ===
Alves made her WTA Tour main-draw debut at the 2015 Rio Open, forming a doubles team with Brazilian partner Ingrid Martins.

=== 2016: First singles title ===
Carol secured her first ITF singles title at a tournament in Hammamet, Tunisia.

=== 2017: Fed Cup debut ===
Alves debuted for Brazil in the 2017 Fed Cup and has achieved a win-loss record of 11–4 in the competition, as of January 2025.

=== 2019: Pan American Games bronze ===
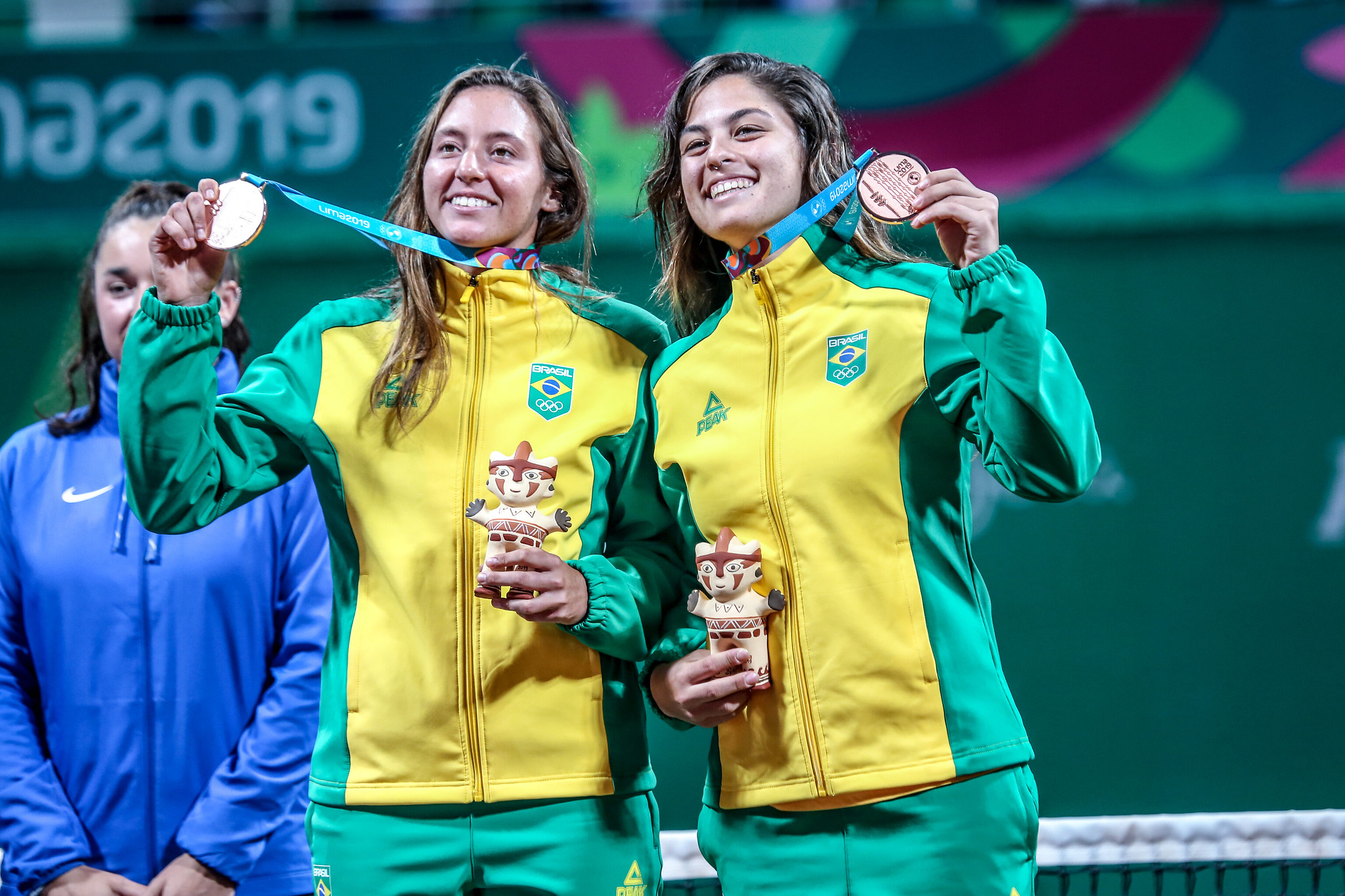
Alves and Luisa Stefani at the 2019 Pan American Games medal ceremony.

At the 2019 Pan American Games in Lima, Peru, Carol won the bronze medal in the women's doubles event, partnering with fellow Brazilian Luisa Stefani.

Later that year, Alves received the Heart Award for her outstanding performance during the Americas Zone Group I of the 2019 Fed Cup.

"I am very happy to be recognized with this award. I want to thank my entire Fed Cup team, both the athletes and the support staff who made this possible. Above all, I am proud to help others through this recognition," said Alves after receiving the award.

=== 2021: First WTA 125 final ===
In November 2021 and partnering Marina Bassols Ribera, she reached her first WTA 125 final in the doubles at the 2021 Montevideo Open, losing to top seeds Irina Bara and Ekaterine Gorgodze. This result elevated her into the top 150 of the WTA doubles rankings.

=== 2022 ===
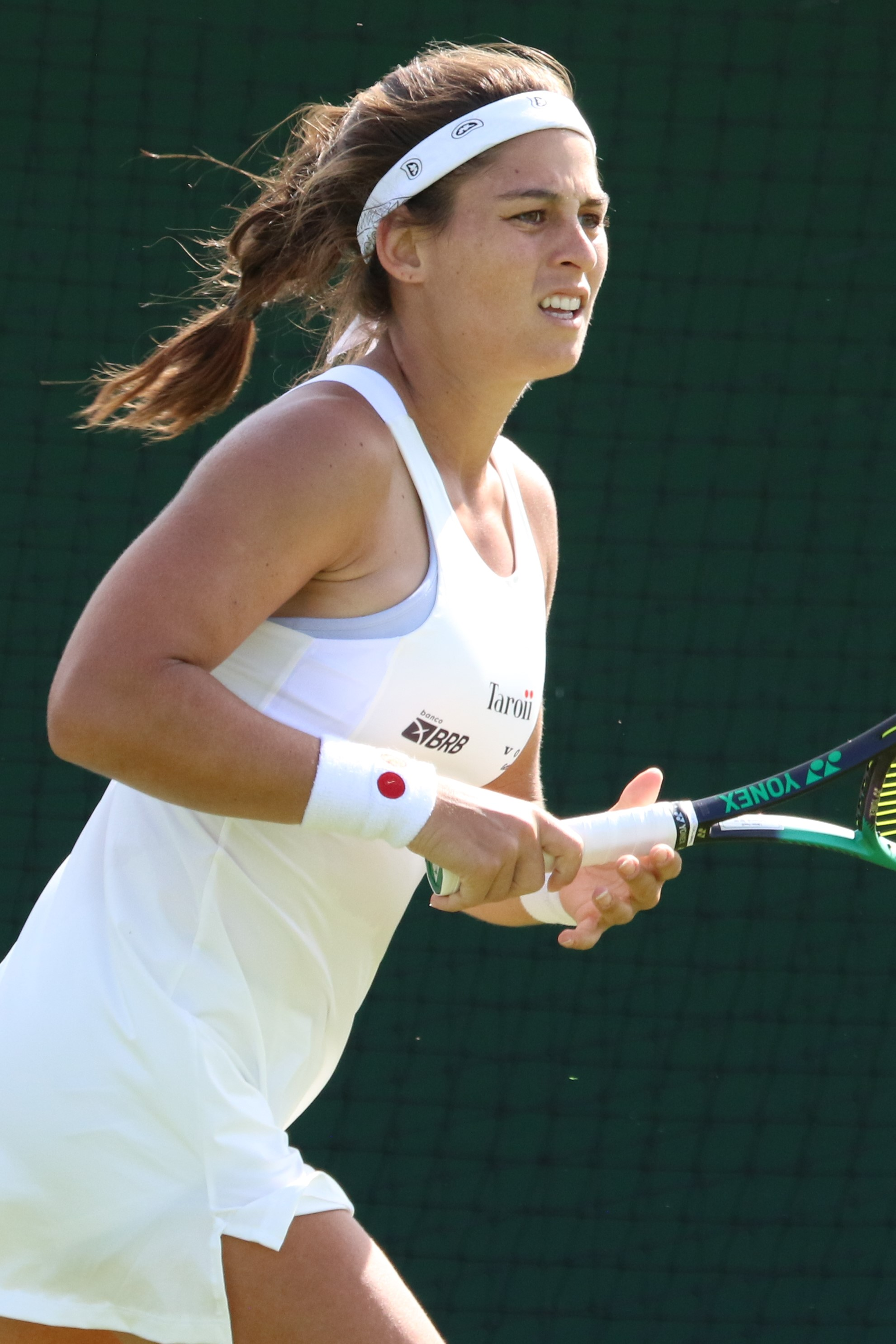
Alves at Wimbledon 2022.

In April 2022, Carol participated in the Billie Jean King Cup in Salinas, Ecuador, teaming up with Beatriz Haddad Maia to defeat Argentine players Jazmin Ortenzi and Julia Riera in a match lasting over three hours.

=== 2023: Breakthrough victories ===
Carol earned her first main-draw singles win at a WTA Tour-level event by defeating Dayana Yastremska in the Copa Colsanitas opening round.

In May, she claimed her biggest title yet at the W25 in Castell-Platja d'Aro, Spain, defeating Carlota Martinez in the final.

"I'm thrilled with this title, my first ITF W25. It was a challenging week with tough matches and difficult conditions. This victory crowns all my hard work. I am grateful to my team at ADK Tennis, especially coach Luiz Peniza," Carol said after the win.

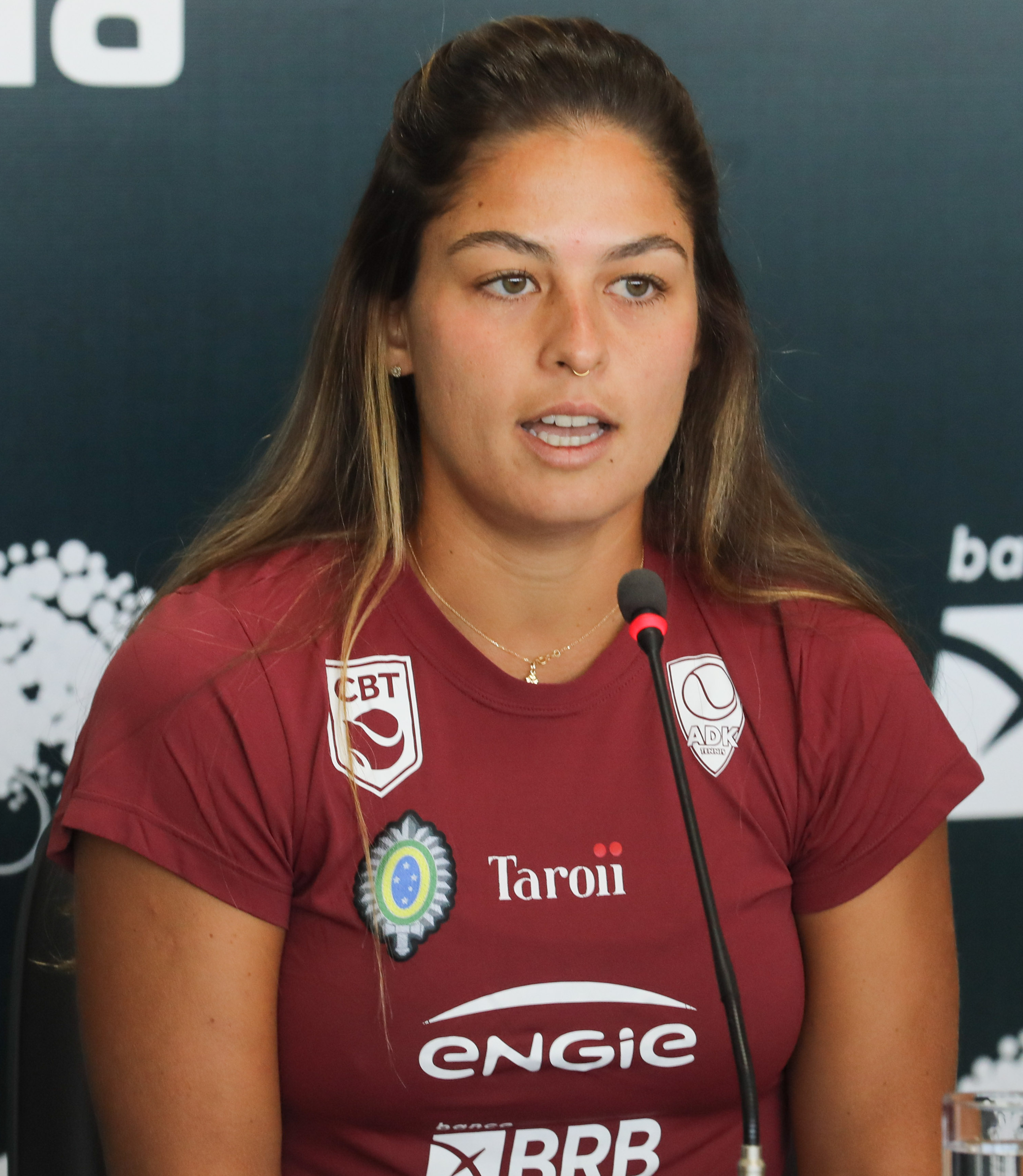
Alves during the announcement of the Brazil vs. South Korea Billie Jean King Cup tie in Brasília.

As a qualifier, Alves defeated fifth seed Caroline Dolehide in three sets to reach the second round at the 2023 Cali Open, where she lost to Valeriya Strakhova in another match which went to a deciding set.

Again having qualified for the main draw, she reached the second round at the Bogata Open, with a three-set win over Dayana Yastremska, before losing to second seed and eventual champion Tatjana Maria.

In late July, Alves participated in the W60 tournament in Feira de Santana. In the singles draw, she lost in the first round to American Haley Giavara in straight sets. In doubles, paired with French player Kristina Mladenovic, Alves reached the second round but withdrew before the match against Brazilian duo Helena Bueno and Maria Carolina Ferreira Turchetto due to Mladenović's withdrawal.

Later, Alves competed in another tournament, a W80 event in Brasília. In singles, she lost in the first round to 18-year-old Canadian Cadence Brace, in straight sets. In doubles, however, she partnered with Argentine player Julia Riera and won the title, defeating the British-Ukrainian duo Eden Silva and Valeriya Strakhova in the final. This title was the biggest of Alves' career at the time.

"Her partner withdrew, but playing together for the first time worked out perfectly. I'm very happy with this achievement. Competing at home, traveling with my coach, and facing high-level players make a big difference in our calendar. I can only thank CBT and the tournament sponsors, who are also my personal sponsors,” said Alves after winning the title.

In October, Alves competed in her second Pan American Games, this time in Santiago. She won two matches in the singles draw, before losing in the quarterfinals to Argentina's María Lourdes Carlé.

=== 2024 ===
Alves began the 2024 season representing Brazil at the United Cup in Perth, Australia, a mixed-team competition. This was her second consecutive appearance at the event. Although she did not play any matches, the Brazilian team struggled and was eliminated in the group stage, with Haddad Maia securing the team's sole victory by defeating Sara Sorribes Tormo, in straight sets.

During the Billie Jean King Cup qualifiers, Alves stepped in for Laura Pigossi to face Germany's Laura Siegemund. Despite losing 2–1, she was praised for winning her first set against a top-100 player and putting up a strong fight.

In May, Alves claimed her seventh career singles title at the W15 in São João da Boa Vista, São Paulo, defeating an Argentine opponent in the final.

In November, with Luisa Stefani sidelined due to a knee operation, Alves partnered with Haddad Maia in the decisive doubles match of the Billie Jean King Cup tie against Argentina. They defeated Jazmín Ortenzi and Julia Riera to secure Brazil's place in the 2025 Finals qualifiers.

=== 2025: First W35 singles title ===
Alves began her 2025 season competing in the United Cup, representing Brazil. In the tournament's first tie, Brazil faced China. Carolina and Rafael Matos teamed up for the mixed doubles match, but they were defeated, contributing to a clean sweep by the Chinese team in that tie.

Alves and the Brazilians could not defeat China in the United Cup. This kept Brazil in difficult contention for the tournament.

The defeats from Alves/Matos in mixed doubles and earlier from their teammates Haddad Maia and Thiago Monteiro in singles matches complicated Brazil's chances of advancing further in the United Cup.

Brazilian team's struggles continued in the United Cup, as Carolina and Rafael Matos were defeated once again in the mixed-doubles match during their final tie, this time against Germany. Despite their efforts, the Brazilian team was unable to secure a single victory in the tournament, finishing their campaign without advancing past the group stage.

Alves second tournament of the season was a W35 in Buenos Aires where she participated in both singles and doubles. In the doubles draw, Alves played with Jazmín Ortenzi and lost in the first round, in straight sets, facing Noelia Zeballos from Bolivia and Miriana Tona from Italy.

In the singles draw, Alves became the champion, winning against Ortenzi in the final in straight sets. This was her first singles W35 title, her eighth singles professional title and her biggest to date.

In the next week, Alves participated at another W35 tournament in Buenos Aires. Again partnering with Jazmín Ortenzi they would repeat previous week's campaign in the doubles draw and also lost at the second round, this time against Mexicans Ana Sofia Sanchez and Victoria Rodriguez in the match tiebraker. At the singles draw Alves reached the semifinals and once again faced Ortenzi, but this time was defeated in two sets and ended her eighth consecutive win streak.

In February, Alves played a series of ITF tournaments at Antalya, Turkey. In the first one, at the W35 level, she reached the quarterfinals but lost against Amarissa Tóth by a score of 6–7, 0–6. Alves also participated at the doubles draw. Playing alongside Zhibek Kulambayeva from Kazakhstan they would not pass through the first match, in the round of 16, and lost to Spanish Ángela Fita Boluda and Swiss Ylena In-Albon in the match tiebrak.

In the second Antalya's tournament, once again at the W35 level, Alves lost in the singles first round to sixteen year old Czech Alena Kovačková, in straight sets. Alves also played at the doubles draw, this time partnering with fellow Brazilian Ana Candiotto. They would stop in the first round with a two set loss against Amarissa Toth from Hungary and Živa Falkner from Slovenia.

In the third tournament at Antalya, this time at a W15 event, Alves reached the round of 16 but lost to Yuki Naito.

In Alves' fourth and last tournament at Antalya, the third one at the W35 level, she got to the round of 16 in the singles draw, but lost in straight sets to Italy's 18 year old and world No. 823, Vittoria Paganetti, with a score of 5–7, 6–7.

=== 2026: Two ITF singles titles ===
In January, Alves won the singles title of a W35 tournament in Buenos Aires, played on clay courts. Seeded third and ranked No. 232 in the world at the time, she defeated Spain’s Carlota Martínez Cirez in the final in two sets to claim the ninth singles title of her career.

In June, Alves participated in a W35 tournament in Cuiabá. She finished as the champion of the singles draw, winning the final against Chilean Antonia Vergara Rivera in three sets, in a match that lasted three hours and 18 minutes. It was her tenth professional singles title.

== Personal life ==
Carolina Meligeni Alves is of Argentine descent through her mother. She is the niece of former tennis player Fernando Meligeni and sister of tennis player Felipe Meligeni Alves.

== WTA 125 finals ==
=== Doubles: 1 (runner-up) ===
Result	Date	Tournament	Surface	Partner	Opponents	Score
Loss	Nov 2021	Montevideo Open, Uruguay	Clay	(Spain) Marina Bassols Ribera	(Romania) Irina Bara (Georgia (country)) Ekaterine Gorgodze	4–6, 3–6

== ITF Circuit finals ==
=== Singles: 27 (11 titles, 16 runner-ups) ===
Legend W60/75 tournaments (0–2) W50 tournaments (0–1) W25/35 tournaments (5–7) W10/15 tournaments (6–6)	Finals by surface Hard (0–1) Clay (11–15)

Result	W–L	Date	Tournament	Tier	Surface	Opponent	Score
Loss	0–1	Nov 2013	ITF Rio Preto, Brazil	W10	Clay	(Brazil) Gabriela Cé	2–6, 6–4, 5–7
Loss	0–2	Nov 2016	ITF Hammamet, Tunisia	W10	Clay	(Germany) Katharina Hobgarski	0–6, 1–6
Win	1–2	Dec 2016	ITF Hammamet, Tunisia	W10	Clay	(Italy) Gaia Sanesi	6–3, 6–0
Win	2–2	Dec 2016	ITF Hammamet, Tunisia	W10	Clay	(Bosnia and Herzegovina) Jelena Simic	6–0, 4–6, 7–5
Loss	2–3	Sep 2017	ITF Antalya, Turkey	W15	Clay	(Greece) Despina Papamichail	1–6, 4–6
Loss	2–4	Nov 2017	ITF Antalya, Turkey	W15	Clay	(Romania) Nicoleta Dascălu	5–7, 3–6
Loss	2–5	Sep 2018	ITF Santa Margherita di Pula, Italy	W25	Clay	(Germany) Katharina Hobgarski	6–7^{(3)}, 2–6
Win	3–5	Sep 2019	ITF São Paulo, Brazil	W15	Clay	(Brazil) Thaisa Grana Pedretti	7–5, 6–1
Loss	3–6	Feb 2020	ITF Cancún, Mexico	W15	Hard	(Venezuela) Andrea Gámiz	7–6^{(5)}, 5–7, 0–6
Win	4–6	Nov 2020	ITF Cairo, Egypt	W15	Clay	(Russia) Daria Mishina	7–5, 6–4
Loss	4–7	Nov 2020	ITF Cairo, Egypt	W15	Clay	(Russia) Erika Andreeva	1–6, 3–6
Win	5–7	Dec 2020	ITF Cairo, Egypt	W15	Clay	(Russia) Elina Avanesyan	6–0, 7–5
Loss	5–8	Mar 2021	ITF Buenos Aires, Argentina	W25	Clay	(Japan) Yuki Naito	6–1, 4–6, 3–6
Loss	5–9	Feb 2022	ITF Tucumán, Argentina	W25	Clay	(Czech Republic) Brenda Fruhvirtová	3–6, 3–6
Loss	5–10	May 2022	Open Saint-Gaudens, France	W60	Clay	(Switzerland) Ylena In-Albon	6–4, 3–6, 4–6
Loss	5–11	Mar 2023	ITF Tucumán, Argentina	W25	Clay	(Spain) Rosa Vicens Mas	2–6, 1–6
Win	6–11	May 2023	ITF Platja d'Aro, Spain	W25	Clay	(Spain) Carlota Martinez Cirez	6–1, 6–7^{(1)}, 6–4
Win	7-11	Mar 2024	ITF São João da Boa Vista, Brazil	W15	Clay	(Argentina) Julieta Lara Estable	4–6, 6–1, 6–3
Loss	7–12	Apr 2024	ITF Anapoima, Colombia	W35	Clay	(Russia) Daria Lodikova	4–6, 6–4, 4–6
Win	8–12	Jan 2025	ITF Buenos Aires, Argentina	W35	Clay	(Argentina) Jazmín Ortenzi	6–2, 6–4
Loss	8–13	Mar 2025	ITF Chihuahua, Mexico	W50	Clay	(Ukraine) Valeriya Strakhova	7–5, 2–6, 4–6
Loss	8–14	Apr 2025	ITF São Paulo, Brazil	W35	Clay	(Italy) Miriana Tona	5–7, 4–6
Loss	8–15	Jun 2025	Macha Lake Open, Czech Republic	W75	Clay	(Czech Republic) Laura Samson	6–2, 2–6, 3–6
Loss	8–16	Oct 2025	ITF São Paulo, Brazil	W35	Clay	(Brazil) Laura Pigossi	7–5, 5–7, 2–6
Win	9–16	Jan 2026	ITF Buenos Aires, Argentina	W35	Clay	(Spain) Carlota Martinez Cirez	6–0, 6–2
Win	10–16	Jun 2026	ITF Cuiabá, Brazil	W35	Clay	(Chile) Antonia Vergara Rivera	7–6^{(2)}, 4–6, 6–4
Win	11–16	Jul 2026	ITF Pergamino, Argentina	W35	Clay	(Argentina) Victoria Bosio	4–6, 6–3, 6–2

=== Doubles: 41 (24 titles, 17 runner-ups) ===
Legend W80 tournaments (1–0) W60 tournaments (2–2) W40/50 tournaments (1–0) W25 tournaments (7–7) W10/15 tournaments (13–8)	Finals by surface Hard (4–1) Clay (20–16)

Result	W–L	Date	Tournament	Tier	Surface	Partner	Opponents	Score
Win	1–0	Sep 2013	ITF Curitiba, Brazil	W10	Clay	(Brazil) Leticia Garcia Vidal	(Brazil) Maria Vitória Beirão (Brazil) Ana Clara Duarte	4–6, 6–4, [10–8]
Loss	1–1	Nov 2013	ITF Rio Preto, Brazil	W10	Clay	(Brazil) Juliana Rocha Cardoso	(Brazil) Gabriela Cé (Brazil) Nathália Rossi	3–6, 4–6
Loss	1–2	Apr 2014	ITF Rio Preto, Brazil	W10	Clay	(Brazil) Ingrid Martins	(Brazil) Maria Fernanda Alves (Brazil) Paula Cristina Gonçalves	2–6, 0–6
Win	2–2	Jun 2014	ITF Villa del Dique, Argentina	W10	Clay	(Argentina) Constanza Vega	(Brazil) Nathaly Kurata (Brazil) Nathália Rossi	7–6^{(4)}, 6–2
Loss	2–3	Jul 2014	ITF Campos do Jordão, Brazil	W15	Hard	(Brazil) Ingrid Martins	(Brazil) Nathaly Kurata (Brazil) Giovanna Tomita	3–6, 2–6
Win	3–3	Mar 2015	ITF São José dos Campos, Brazil	W10	Clay	(Argentina) Victoria Bosio	(Brazil) Gabriela Cé (Brazil) Laura Pigossi	7–6^{(3)}, 6–4
Win	4–3	Mar 2016	ITF Rio Preto, Brazil	W10	Clay	(Paraguay) Camila Giangreco Campiz	(Colombia) María Herazo González (Bolivia) Noelia Zeballos	6–3, 6–4
Loss	4–4	Apr 2016	ITF Rio Preto, Brazil	W10	Clay	(Argentina) Julieta Estable	(Chile) Fernanda Brito (Argentina) Constanza Vega	6–2, 4–6, [6–10]
Loss	4–5	Apr 2016	ITF Bauru, Brazil	W10	Clay	(Argentina) Julieta Estable	(Brazil) Nathaly Kurata (Brazil) Eduarda Piai	6–7^{(4)}, 5–7
Win	5–5	May 2016	ITF Villa María, Argentina	W10	Clay	(Argentina) Constanza Vega	(Chile) Bárbara Gatica (Argentina) Stephanie Petit	6–1, 7–6^{(4)}
Win	6–5	Jun 2016	ITF Buenos Aires, Argentina	W10	Clay	(Paraguay) Camila Giangreco Campiz	(Argentina) Sofía Blanco (Argentina) Constanza Vega	2–6, 6–2, [11–9]
Loss	6–6	Jun 2016	ITF Oeiras, Portugal	W10	Clay	(Argentina) Victoria Bosio	(Cambodia) Andrea Ka (France) Laëtitia Sarrazin	6–4, 5–7, [3–10]
Win	7–6	Jul 2016	ITF Brussels, Belgium	W10	Clay	(Australia) Ellen Perez	(Switzerland) Karin Kennel (Belgium) Hélène Scholsen	6–2, 6–3
Win	8–6	Oct 2016	ITF Hammamet, Tunisia	W10	Clay	(Switzerland) Karin Kennel	(Chile) Fernanda Brito (Bolivia) Noelia Zeballos	6–2, 4–6, [11–9]
Loss	8–7	Nov 2016	ITF Hammamet, Tunisia	W10	Clay	(Bolivia) Noelia Zeballos	(Romania) Diana Enache (Romania) Ilona Georgiana Ghioroaie	6–3, 1–6, [8–10]
Loss	8–8	Nov 2016	ITF Hammamet, Tunisia	W10	Clay	(Bolivia) Noelia Zeballos	(Serbia) Tamara Čurović (Belgium) Déborah Kerfs	6–7^{(5)}, 3–6
Win	9–8	Dec 2016	ITF Hammamet, Tunisia	W10	Clay	(Serbia) Tamara Čurović	(Romania) Oana Gavrilă (Slovakia) Sandra Jamrichová	6–1, 3–6, [10–8]
Win	10–8	Dec 2016	ITF Hammamet, Tunisia	W10	Clay	(Serbia) Tamara Čurović	(Romania) Oana Gavrilă (Slovakia) Sandra Jamrichová	6–3, 6–2
Loss	10–9	Dec 2017	Copa Santiago, Chile	W25	Clay	(Mexico) Ana Sofía Sánchez	(Belgium) Tamaryn Hendler (Russia) Anastasia Pivovarova	5–7, 2–6
Win	11–9	Mar 2018	ITF São José dos Campos, Brazil	W15	Clay	(Brazil) Thaisa Grana Pedretti	(Greece) Eleni Kordolaimi (Peru) Dominique Schaefer	6–4, 6–1
Loss	11–10	Jun 2018	ITF Barcelona, Spain	W25	Clay	(France) Jade Suvrijn	(United States) Jessica Ho (China) Wang Xiyu	3–6, 1–6
Loss	11–11	Jun 2018	Open de Montpellier, France	W25	Clay	(Italy) Martina Colmegna	(France) Elixane Lechemia (France) Alice Ramé	7–6^{(5)}, 2–6, [6–10]
Loss	11–12	Mar 2019	ITF Campinas, Brazil	W25	Clay	(Brazil) Gabriela Cé	(Montenegro) Danka Kovinić (Brazil) Laura Pigossi	3–6, 2–6
Loss	11–13	Jun 2019	Internazionale di Roma, Italy	W60	Clay	(Romania) Elena Bogdan	(Italy) Elisabetta Cocciaretto (Romania) Nicoleta Dascălu	5–7, 6–4, [7–10]
Loss	11–14	Jun 2019	ITF Padova, Italy	W25	Clay	(Brazil) Gabriela Cé	(Romania) Cristina Dinu (Italy) Angelica Moratelli	6–7^{(7)}, 6–3, [8–10]
Win	12–14	Sep 2019	ITF Bagnatica, Italy	W25	Clay	(Brazil) Gabriela Cé	(Italy) Martina Caregaro (Italy) Federica di Sarra	6–2, 1–6, [10–5]
Win	13–14	Oct 2019	ITF Cucúta, Colombia	W25	Clay	(Mexico) Renata Zarazúa	(Colombia) Emiliana Arango (Argentina) Victoria Bosio	6–1, ret.
Loss	13–15	Nov 2019	ITF Orlando, United States	W25	Clay	(Mexico) Renata Zarazúa	(United States) Katharine Fahey (Germany) Stephanie Wagner	6–4, 2–6, [7–10]
Win	14–15	Feb 2020	ITF Cancún, Mexico	W15	Hard	(Venezuela) Andrea Gámiz	(France) Tiphanie Fiquet (France) Léolia Jeanjean	5–7, 6–2, [11–9]
Win	15–15	Sep 2020	ITF Porto, Portugal	W15	Hard	(Spain) Marina Bassols Ribera	(Spain) Júlia Payola (Japan) Himeno Sakatsume	6–3, 4–6, [10–7]
Win	16–15	Aug 2021	ITF Bydgoszcz, Poland	W25	Clay	(Belarus) Iryna Shymanovich	(Japan) Hiroko Kuwata (Colombia) Yuliana Lizarazo	6–1, 3–6, [10–5]
Loss	16–16	Aug 2021	ITF Radom, Poland	W25	Clay	(Belarus) Iryna Shymanovich	(Japan) Mana Kawamura (Japan) Funa Kozaki	4–6, 2–6
Win	17–16	Aug 2021	Vrnjačka Banja Open, Serbia	W25	Clay	(Venezuela) Andrea Gámiz	(Romania) Ioana Loredana Roșca (Egypt) Sandra Samir	6–4, 6–1
Win	18–16	Aug 2021	Zubr Cup Přerov, Czech Republic	W60	Clay	(United Kingdom) Sarah Beth Grey	(Japan) Mana Kawamura (Japan) Funa Kozaki	6–4, 3–6, [13–11]
Win	19–16	Sep 2021	ITF Vienna, Austria	W25	Clay	(Poland) Martyna Kubka	(Russia) Erika Andreeva (Russia) Ekaterina Kazionova	6–7^{(1)}, 6–4, [10–7]
Win	20–16	Sep 2021	ITF Leiria, Portugal	W25	Hard	(Russia) Anastasia Tikhonova	(Spain) Celia Cerviño Ruiz (Italy) Angelica Moratelli	6–4, 6–4
Win	21–16	Oct 2021	ITF Lima, Peru	W25	Clay	(Venezuela) Andrea Gámiz	(Mexico) Victoria Rodríguez (Netherlands) Bibiane Schoofs	6–3, 7–6^{(2)}
Win	22–16	Nov 2021	Aberto da República, Brazil	W60	Clay (i)	(Argentina) María Lourdes Carlé	(Ukraine) Valeriya Strakhova (Australia) Olivia Tjandramulia	6–2, 6–1
Loss	22–17	Nov 2022	Barranquilla Open, Colombia	W60	Clay	(Ukraine) Valeriya Strakhova	(Ukraine) Kateryna Volodko (Hungary) Tímea Babos	6–3, 5–7, [7–10]
Win	23–17	Aug 2023	Aberto da República, Brazil	W80	Hard	(Argentina) Julia Riera	(United Kingdom) Eden Silva (Ukraine) Valeriya Strakhova	6–2, 6–3
Win	24–17	Sep 2024	ITF Pilar, Argentina	W50	Clay	(Argentina) Julia Riera	(Italy) Nicole Fossa Huergo (Kazakhstan) Zhibek Kulambayeva	6–4, 7–5

== Awards ==
2019

- Fed Cup Heart Award Americas Zone Group I
