= Copa Colsanitas =

- 2026 Copa Colsanitas

WTA Tour
- Event name: Copa Colsanitas Colsubsidio
- Founded: 1998
- Location: Bogotá; Colombia
- Venue: Country Club de Bogotá
- Category: WTA 250
- Surface: Clay – outdoors
- Draw: 32S / 24Q / 16D
- Prize money: US$283,347 (2026)
- Website: copacolsanitas.com

Current champions (2026)
- Singles: (Czech Republic) Marie Bouzková
- Doubles: (United States) Caroline Dolehide; Irina Khromacheva

The Copa Colsanitas Colsubsidio is a women's professional tennis tournament held in Bogotá, Colombia, at the Country Club de Bogotá. Held since 1998, this WTA 250 tournament is played on outdoor clay courts.

== Past finals ==
=== Singles ===
Year	Champion	Runner-up	Score
↓ Tier IV ↓
1998	(Argentina) Paola Suárez	(Canada) Sonya Jeyaseelan	6–3, 6–4
1999	(Colombia) Fabiola Zuluaga	(Greece) Christína Papadáki	6–1, 6–3
2000	(Austria) Patricia Wartusch	(Italy) Tathiana Garbin	4–6, 6–1, 6–4
↓ Tier III ↓
2001	(Argentina) Paola Suárez (2)	(Hungary) Rita Kuti-Kis	6–2, 6–4
2002	(Colombia) Fabiola Zuluaga (2)	(Slovenia) Katarina Srebotnik	6–1, 6–4
2003	(Colombia) Fabiola Zuluaga (3)	(Spain) Anabel Medina	6–3, 6–2
2004	(Colombia) Fabiola Zuluaga (4)	(Spain) María Sánchez	3–6, 6–4, 6–2
2005	(Italy) Flavia Pennetta	(Spain) Lourdes Domínguez	7–6^{(7–4)}, 6–4
2006	(Spain) Lourdes Domínguez	(Italy) Flavia Pennetta	7–6^{(7–3)}, 6–4
2007	(Italy) Roberta Vinci	(Italy) Tathiana Garbin	6–7^{(5–7)}, 6–4, 0–3 ret.
2008	(Spain) Nuria Llagostera	(Argentina) María Emilia Salerni	6–0, 6–4
↓ International ↓
2009	(Spain) María José Martínez	(Argentina) Gisela Dulko	6–3, 6–2
2010	(Colombia) Mariana Duque Mariño	(Germany) Angelique Kerber	6–4, 6–3
2011	(Spain) Lourdes Domínguez (2)	(France) Mathilde Johansson	2–6, 6–3, 6–2
2012	(Spain) Lara Arruabarrena	(Russia) Alexandra Panova	6–2, 7–5
2013	(Serbia) Jelena Janković	(Argentina) Paula Ormaechea	6–1, 6–2
2014	(France) Caroline Garcia	(Serbia) Jelena Janković	6–3, 6–4
2015	(Brazil) Teliana Pereira	(Kazakhstan) Yaroslava Shvedova	7–6^{(7–2)}, 6–1
2016	(United States) Irina Falconi	(Spain) Sílvia Soler Espinosa	6–2, 2–6, 6–4
2017	(Italy) Francesca Schiavone	(Spain) Lara Arruabarrena	6–4, 7–5
2018	(Slovakia) Anna Schmiedlová	(Spain) Lara Arruabarrena	6–2, 6–4
2019	(United States) Amanda Anisimova	(Australia) Astra Sharma	4–6, 6–4, 6–1
2020	Not held due to the COVID-19 pandemic		
2021	(Colombia) Camila Osorio	(Slovenia) Tamara Zidanšek	5–7, 6–3, 6–4
2022	(Germany) Tatjana Maria	(Brazil) Laura Pigossi	6–3, 4–6, 6–2
2023	(Germany) Tatjana Maria (2)	(United States) Peyton Stearns	6–3, 2–6, 6–4
2024	(Colombia) Camila Osorio (2)	(Czech Republic) Marie Bouzková	6–3, 7–6^{(7–5)}
2025	(Colombia) Camila Osorio (3)	(Poland) Katarzyna Kawa	6–3, 6–3
2026	(Czech Republic) Marie Bouzková	(Hungary) Panna Udvardy	6–7^{(7–9)}, 6–2, 6–2

=== Doubles ===
Year	Champions	Runners-up	Score
1998	(Slovakia) Janette Husárová (Argentina) Paola Suárez	(Venezuela) Melissa Mazzotta (Russia) Ekaterina Sysoeva	3–6, 6–2, 6–3
1999	(Greece) Christína Papadáki (Netherlands) Seda Noorlander	(Argentina) Laura Montalvo (Argentina) Paola Suárez	6–4, 7–6^{(7–5)}
2000	(Argentina) Laura Montalvo (Argentina) Paola Suárez (2)	(Hungary) Rita Kuti-Kis (Hungary) Petra Mandula	6–4, 6–2
2001	(Italy) Tathiana Garbin (Slovakia) Janette Husárová (2)	(Argentina) Laura Montalvo (Argentina) Paola Suárez	6–4, 2–6, 6–4
2002	(Spain) Virginia Ruano Pascual (Argentina) Paola Suárez (3)	(Slovenia) Tina Križan (Slovenia) Katarina Srebotnik	6–2, 6–1
2003	(Slovenia) Katarina Srebotnik (Sweden) Åsa Svensson	(Slovenia) Tina Križan (Ukraine) Tatiana Perebiynis	6–2, 6–4
2004	(Austria) Barbara Schwartz (Germany) Jasmin Wöhr	(Spain) Anabel Medina Garrigues (Spain) Arantxa Parra Santonja	6–1, 6–3
2005	(Switzerland) Emmanuelle Gagliardi (Slovenia) Tina Pisnik	(Slovakia) Ľubomíra Kurhajcová (Czech Republic) Barbora Strýcová	6–4, 6–3
2006	(Argentina) Gisela Dulko (Italy) Flavia Pennetta	(Hungary) Ágnes Szávay (Germany) Jasmin Wöhr	7–6^{(7–1)}, 6–1
2007	(Spain) Lourdes Domínguez Lino (Argentina) Paola Suárez (4)	(Italy) Flavia Pennetta (Italy) Roberta Vinci	1–6, 6–3, [11–9]
2008	(Czech Republic) Iveta Benešová (United States) Bethanie Mattek-Sands	(Croatia) Jelena Kostanić Tošić (Germany) Martina Müller	6–3, 6–3
2009	(Spain) Nuria Llagostera Vives (Spain) María José Martínez Sánchez	(Argentina) Gisela Dulko (Italy) Flavia Pennetta	7–5, 3–6, [10–7]
2010	(Argentina) Gisela Dulko (2) (Romania) Edina Gallovits	(Ukraine) Olga Savchuk (Belarus) Anastasiya Yakimova	6–2, 7–6^{(8–6)}
2011	(Romania) Edina Gallovits-Hall (2) (Spain) Anabel Medina Garrigues	(Canada) Sharon Fichman (Spain) Laura Pous Tió	2–6, 7–6^{(8–6)}, [11–9]
2012	(Czech Republic) Eva Birnerová (Russia) Alexandra Panova	(Luxembourg) Mandy Minella (Switzerland) Stefanie Vögele	6–2, 6–2
2013	(Hungary) Tímea Babos (Luxembourg) Mandy Minella	(Czech Republic) Eva Birnerová (Russia) Alexandra Panova	6–4, 6–3
2014	(Spain) Lara Arruabarrena (France) Caroline Garcia	(United States) Vania King (South Africa) Chanelle Scheepers	7–6^{(7–5)}, 6–4
2015	(Brazil) Paula Cristina Gonçalves (Brazil) Beatriz Haddad Maia	(United States) Irina Falconi (United States) Shelby Rogers	6–3, 3–6, [10–6]
2016	(Spain) Lara Arruabarrena (2) (Germany) Tatjana Maria	(Brazil) Gabriela Cé (Venezuela) Andrea Gámiz	6–2, 4–6, [10–8]
2017	(Brazil) Beatriz Haddad Maia (2) (Argentina) Nadia Podoroska	(Paraguay) Verónica Cepede Royg (Poland) Magda Linette	6–3, 7–6^{(7–4)}
2018	(Slovenia) Dalila Jakupović (Russia) Irina Khromacheva	(Colombia) Mariana Duque Mariño (Argentina) Nadia Podoroska	6–3, 6–4
2019	(Australia) Zoe Hives (Australia) Astra Sharma	(United States) Hayley Carter (United States) Ena Shibahara	6–1, 6–2
2020	Not held due to the COVID-19 pandemic		
2021	(France) Elixane Lechemia (United States) Ingrid Neel	(Romania) Mihaela Buzărnescu (Germany) Anna-Lena Friedsam	6–3, 6–4
2022	(Australia) Astra Sharma (2) (Indonesia) Aldila Sutjiadi	(United States) Emina Bektas (United Kingdom) Tara Moore	4–6, 6–4, [11–9]
2023	Irina Khromacheva (2); Iryna Shymanovich	(Georgia (country)) Oksana Kalashnikova (Poland) Katarzyna Piter	6–1, 3–6, [10–6]
2024	(Spain) Cristina Bucșa; Kamilla Rakhimova	(Hungary) Anna Bondár; Irina Khromacheva	7–6^{(7–5)}, 3–6, [10–8]
2025	(Spain) Cristina Bucșa (2) (Spain) Sara Sorribes Tormo	(Romania) Irina Bara (Brazil) Laura Pigossi	5–7, 6–2, [10–5]
2026	(United States) Caroline Dolehide; Irina Khromacheva (3)	(Ukraine) Valeriya Strakhova; Anastasia Tikhonova	7–6^{(7–5)}, 6-4

=== Championships by country ===
Country	Singles	First	Last	Doubles	First	Last	Overall
Spain (ESP)	5	2006	2012	9	2002	2025	14
Argentina (ARG)	2	1998	2001	8	1998	2017	10
Colombia (COL)	8	1999	2025	0			8
Italy (ITA)	3	2005	2017	2	2001	2006	5
United States (USA)	2	2016	2019	3	2008	2026	5
Germany (GER)	2	2022	2023	2	2004	2016	4
Slovakia (SVK)	1	2018	2018	3	1998	2005	4
France (FRA)	1	2014	2014	2	2014	2021	3
Czech Republic (CZE)	1	2026	2026	2	2008	2012	3
Brazil (BRA)	1	2015	2015	2	2015	2017	3
Austria (AUT)	1	2000	2000	1	2004	2004	2
Serbia (SER)	1	2013	2013	0			1
Russia (RUS)	0			4	2012	2026	4
Australia (AUS)	0			3	2019	2022	3
Slovenia (SLO)	0			2	2003	2018	2
Romania (RUM)	0			2	2010	2011	2
Greece (GRE)	0			1	1999	1999	1
Netherlands (NED)	0			1	1999	1999	1
Sweden (SWE)	0			1	2003	2003	1
Switzerland (SUI)	0			1	2005	2005	1
Hungary (HUN)	0			1	2013	2013	1
Luxembourg (LUX)	0			1	2013	2013	1
Indonesia (INA)	0			1	2022	2022	1
