= 2017 Copa Colsanitas – Singles =

Singles
- 2017 Copa Colsanitas

Final
- Champion: (Italy) Francesca Schiavone
- Runner-up: (Spain) Lara Arruabarrena
- Score: 6–4, 7–5

Events
| Singles | Doubles |
| ← 2016 · | Copa Colsanitas | · 2018 → |

Irina Falconi was the defending champion, but lost in the first round to Dalila Jakupović.

Francesca Schiavone won the title, defeating Lara Arruabarrena in the final, 6–4, 7–5. This was Schiavone's final WTA singles title before her retirement in 2018.

== Seeds ==
1. (Netherlands) Kiki Bertens (quarterfinals)
2. (Czech Republic) Kateřina Siniaková (second round)
3. (Sweden) Johanna Larsson (semifinals)
4. (Spain) Lara Arruabarrena (final)
5. (Poland) Magda Linette (quarterfinals)
6. (Romania) Patricia Maria Țig (first round)
7. (Russia) Ekaterina Alexandrova (first round)
8. (Greece) Maria Sakkari (first round)

== Draw ==
=== Key ===
- Q = Qualifier
- WC = Wild card
- LL = Lucky loser
- Alt = Alternate
- ITF = ITF entry
- PR = Protected ranking
- SR = Special ranking
- SE = Special exempt
- JE = Junior exempt
- JR = Junior Accelerator Programme entrant
- CO = College Accelerator Programme entrant
- NG = Next Gen Accelerator Program entrant
- w/o = Walkover
- r = Retired
- d = Defaulted

=== Finals ===
Semifinals
WC | (Italy) Francesca Schiavone | 7 | 6
3 | (Sweden) Johanna Larsson | 5 | 4
4 | (Spain) Lara Arruabarrena | 6 | 4 | 6
(Spain) Sara Sorribes Tormo | 2 | 6 | 4

Final
WC | (Italy) Francesca Schiavone | 6 | 7
4 | (Spain) Lara Arruabarrena | 4 | 5

=== Top half ===
First round
1 | (Netherlands) K Bertens | 6 | 6
(Serbia) N Stojanović | 4 | 1
Q | (Netherlands) C Burger | 5 | 6 | 6
(Germany) T Maria | 7 | 3 | 4
(United States) I Falconi | 2 | 4
(Slovenia) D Jakupović | 6 | 6
WC | (Italy) F Schiavone | 6 | 6
6 | (Romania) PM Țig | 3 | 4
3 | (Sweden) J Larsson | 2 | 6 | 6
Q | (France) F Ferro | 6 | 2 | 1
Q | (Brazil) B Haddad Maia | 6 | 3 | 4
(Paraguay) V Cepede Royg | 2 | 6 | 6
(United States) S Vickery | 6 | 6
WC | (United States) A Mayo | 0 | 2
(Italy) S Errani | 6 | 6
7 | (Russia) E Alexandrova | 2 | 4

Second round
1 | (Netherlands) K Bertens | 6 | 7
Q | (Netherlands) C Burger | 2 | 5
(Slovenia) D Jakupović | 1 | 2
WC | (Italy) F Schiavone | 6 | 6
3 | (Sweden) J Larsson | 6 | 6
(Paraguay) V Cepede Royg | 4 | 4
(United States) S Vickery | 2 | 3
(Italy) S Errani | 6 | 6

Quarterfinals
1 | (Netherlands) K Bertens | 1 | 4
WC | (Italy) F Schiavone | 6 | 6
3 | (Sweden) J Larsson | 7 | 6
(Italy) S Errani | 5 | 4

Semifinals
WC | (Italy) F Schiavone | 7 | 6
3 | (Sweden) J Larsson | 5 | 4

=== Bottom half ===
First round
8 | (Greece) M Sakkari | 3 | 6^{6}
(Spain) S Soler Espinosa | 6 | 7^{8}
(Serbia) A Krunić | 6 | 6
(Colombia) M Duque Mariño | 2 | 4
(Russia) I Khromacheva | 6 | 6
WC | (Colombia) E Arango | 2 | 2
Q | (Switzerland) C Perrin | 6 | 3 | 2
4 | (Spain) L Arruabarrena | 4 | 6 | 6
5 | (Poland) M Linette | 6 | 6
Q | (Argentina) N Podoroska | 1 | 3
(United States) G Min | 3 | 1
(Bulgaria) E Kostova | 6 | 6
(Czech Republic) D Allertová | 1 | 6^{4}
(Spain) S Sorribes Tormo | 6 | 7^{7}
Q | (Switzerland) J Teichmann | 0 | 4
2 | (Czech Republic) K Siniaková | 6 | 6

Second round
(Spain) S Soler Espinosa | 0 | 5
(Serbia) A Krunić | 6 | 7
(Russia) I Khromacheva | 6^{3} | 0
4 | (Spain) L Arruabarrena | 7^{7} | 6
5 | (Poland) M Linette | 6 | 6
(Bulgaria) E Kostova | 4 | 4
(Spain) S Sorribes Tormo | 6 | 6
2 | (Czech Republic) K Siniaková | 2 | 3

Quarterfinals
(Serbia) A Krunić | 5 | 7 | 2
4 | (Spain) L Arruabarrena | 7 | 5 | 6
5 | (Poland) M Linette | 4 | 6 | 6^{5}
(Spain) S Sorribes Tormo | 6 | 4 | 7^{7}

Semifinals
4 | (Spain) L Arruabarrena | 6 | 4 | 6
(Spain) S Sorribes Tormo | 2 | 6 | 4

== Qualifying ==
=== Seeds ===
1. (Hungary) Dalma Gálfi (first round)
2. (Brazil) Beatriz Haddad Maia (qualified)
3. (Czech Republic) Tereza Martincová (qualifying competition, retired)
4. (Netherlands) Cindy Burger (qualified)
5. (Brazil) Paula Cristina Gonçalves (first round)
6. (Canada) Françoise Abanda (qualifying competition)
7. (Argentina) Nadia Podoroska (qualified)
8. (Paraguay) Montserrat González (qualifying competition)
9. (Switzerland) Conny Perrin (qualified)
10. (Brazil) Teliana Pereira (qualifying competition)
11. (Switzerland) Jil Teichmann (qualified)
12. (France) Fiona Ferro (qualified)

=== Qualifiers ===
1. (Argentina) Nadia Podoroska
2. (Brazil) Beatriz Haddad Maia
3. (Switzerland) Conny Perrin
4. (Netherlands) Cindy Burger
5. (France) Fiona Ferro
6. (Switzerland) Jil Teichmann

=== Draw ===
==== First qualifier ====
First round
1 | (Hungary) Dalma Gálfi | 6 | 3 | 4
(Chile) Daniela Seguel | 2 | 6 | 6
(Croatia) Tereza Mrdeža | 4 | 7 | 6^{2}
7 | (Argentina) Nadia Podoroska | 6 | 5 | 7^{7}

Qualifying competition
(Chile) Daniela Seguel | 3 | 6^{4}
7 | (Argentina) Nadia Podoroska | 6 | 7^{7}

==== Second qualifier ====
First round
2 | (Brazil) Beatriz Haddad Maia | 6 | 6
(Poland) Paula Kania | 2 | 2
(Argentina) Catalina Pella | 2 | 4
10 | (Brazil) Teliana Pereira | 6 | 6

Qualifying competition
2 | (Brazil) Beatriz Haddad Maia | 7^{7} | 4 | 6
10 | (Brazil) Teliana Pereira | 6^{4} | 6 | 4

==== Third qualifier ====
First round
3 | (Czech Republic) Tereza Martincová | 6 | 6
(United States) Jacqueline Cako | 3 | 4
WC | (United States) Stephanie Nemtsova | 1 | 1
9 | (Switzerland) Conny Perrin | 6 | 6

Qualifying competition
3 | (Czech Republic) Tereza Martincová | 6 | 1 | 1^{r}
9 | (Switzerland) Conny Perrin | 3 | 6 | 3

==== Fourth qualifier ====
First round
4 | (Netherlands) Cindy Burger | 6 | 6
(Czech Republic) Jesika Malečková | 3 | 4
WC | (Ukraine) Dayana Yastremska | 7 | 2 | 6^{7}
8 | (Paraguay) Montserrat González | 5 | 6 | 7^{9}

Qualifying competition
4 | (Netherlands) Cindy Burger | 7^{8} | 3 | 6
8 | (Paraguay) Montserrat González | 6^{6} | 6 | 3

==== Fifth qualifier ====
First round
5 | (Brazil) Paula Cristina Gonçalves | 6 | 5 | 5
(China) Lu Jiajing | 4 | 7 | 7
(Georgia (country)) Sofia Shapatava | 3 | 6^{5}
12 | (France) Fiona Ferro | 6 | 7^{7}

Qualifying competition
(China) Lu Jiajing | 1 | 2
12 | (France) Fiona Ferro | 6 | 6

==== Sixth qualifier ====
First round
6 | (Canada) Françoise Abanda | 6 | 6
WC | (Colombia) Camila Osorio | 2 | 4
WC | (Colombia) Jessica Plazas | 0 | 2
11 | (Switzerland) Jil Teichmann | 6 | 6

Qualifying competition
6 | (Canada) Françoise Abanda | 5 | 3
11 | (Switzerland) Jil Teichmann | 7 | 6
