= 2021 Copa Colsanitas – Doubles =

Tennis tournament

Doubles
- 2021 Copa Colsanitas

Final
- Champions: (France) Elixane Lechemia (United States) Ingrid Neel
- Runners-up: (Romania) Mihaela Buzărnescu (Germany) Anna-Lena Friedsam
- Score: 6–3, 6–4

Details
- Draw: 16
- Seeds: 4

Events
Singles	Doubles
- Copa Colsanitas

Elixane Lechemia and Ingrid Neel defeated Mihaela Buzărnescu and Anna-Lena Friedsam in the final, 6–3, 6–4, to win the doubles tennis title at the 2021 Copa Colsanitas. It was the duo's first individual career Women's Tennis Association (WTA) doubles titles.

Zoe Hives and Astra Sharma were the defending champions from when the tournament was last held in 2019. Neither defended their title together; Sharma played alongside Aliona Bolsova but lost in the semifinals to Lechemia and Neel, and Hives did not return to compete.

== Seeds ==
1. (Netherlands) Arantxa Rus / (Slovenia) Tamara Zidanšek (quarterfinals)
2. (Australia) Arina Rodionova / (Netherlands) Rosalie van der Hoek (semifinals)
3. (Romania) Mihaela Buzărnescu / (Germany) Anna-Lena Friedsam (final)
4. (United Kingdom) Naomi Broady / (China) Zheng Saisai (first round)

== Draw ==
Key

- Q = Qualifier
- WC = Wild card
- LL = Lucky loser
- Alt = Alternate
- ITF = ITF entry
- PR = Protected ranking
- SR = Special ranking
- SE = Special exempt
- JE = Junior exempt
- JR = Junior Accelerator Programme entrant
- CO = College Accelerator Programme entrant
- NG = Next Gen Accelerator Program entrant
- w/o = Walkover
- r = Retired
- d = Defaulted

=== Draw ===
First round
1	(Netherlands) A Rus (Slovenia) T Zidanšek	1	6	[11]
(New Zealand) E Routliffe (Bulgaria) V Tomova	6	4	[9]
WC	(Colombia) E Arango (Colombia) C Osorio	1	2
(Spain) A Bolsova (Australia) A Sharma	6	6
4	(United Kingdom) N Broady (China) S Zheng	4	6	[8]
(Poland) P Kania-Choduń (Germany) J Wachaczyk	6	4	[10]
(France) E Lechemia (United States) I Neel	7	6
(Romania) I Bara (Slovenia) D Jakupović	5	3
(Russia) Y Sizikova (China) Y Wang	6	6
WC	(Colombia) J Plazas (Colombia) A Samudio	3	2
(Indonesia) B Gumulya (Indonesia) J Rompies	6^{4}	4
3	(Romania) M Buzărnescu (Germany) A-L Friedsam	7^{7}	6
(United States) K Ahn (United States) UM Arconada	4	6	[2]
(Spain) L Arruabarrena (Poland) K Piter	6	2	[10]
(United States) E Bektas (United Kingdom) T Moore	5	7^{8}	[9]
2	(Australia) Ar Rodionova (Netherlands) R van der Hoek	7	6^{6}	[11]

Quarterfinals
1	(Netherlands) A Rus (Slovenia) T Zidanšek	6	1	[6]
(Spain) A Bolsova (Australia) A Sharma	2	6	[10]
(Poland) P Kania-Choduń (Germany) J Wachaczyk	1	6	[11]
(France) E Lechemia (United States) I Neel	6	2	[13]
(Russia) Y Sizikova (China) Y Wang	6^{6}	5
3	(Romania) M Buzărnescu (Germany) A-L Friedsam	7^{8}	7
(Spain) L Arruabarrena (Poland) K Piter	6	2	[7]
2	(Australia) Ar Rodionova (Netherlands) R van der Hoek	4	6	[10]

Semifinals
(Spain) A Bolsova (Australia) A Sharma	7	5	[8]
(France) E Lechemia (United States) I Neel	5	7	[10]
3	(Romania) M Buzărnescu (Germany) A-L Friedsam	7	6
2	(Australia) Ar Rodionova (Netherlands) R van der Hoek	5	1

Final
(France) E Lechemia (United States) I Neel	6	6
3	(Romania) M Buzărnescu (Germany) A-L Friedsam	3	4
