= 2021 Copa Colsanitas – Singles =

Singles
- 2021 Copa Colsanitas

Final
- Champion: (Colombia) Camila Osorio
- Runner-up: (Slovenia) Tamara Zidanšek
- Score: 5–7, 6–3, 6–4

Details
- Draw: 32
- Seeds: 8

Events
Singles	Doubles
← 2019 ·	Copa Colsanitas	· 2022 →

Camila Osorio defeated Tamara Zidanšek in the final, 5–7, 6–3, 6–4 to win the singles tennis title at the 2021 Copa Colsanitas. It was the Colombian teenage wildcard's first WTA Tour singles title. Ranked No. 180, Osorio became the lowest-ranked WTA title holder since world No. 299 Margarita Gasparyan at the 2018 Tashkent Open. Zidanšek was also in contention for her first WTA title.

Amanda Anisimova was the reigning champion from when the tournament was last held in 2019, but chose to compete in Charleston instead.

== Seeds ==
1. (China) Zheng Saisai (second round)
2. (Spain) Sara Sorribes Tormo (first round)
3. (Netherlands) Arantxa Rus (second round)
4. (Denmark) Clara Tauson (first round)
5. (Slovenia) Tamara Zidanšek (final)
6. (Italy) Jasmine Paolini (second round)
7. (Czech Republic) Tereza Martincová (second round)
8. (China) Wang Yafan (second round)

== Draw ==
=== Key ===
- Q = Qualifier
- WC = Wild card
- LL = Lucky loser
- Alt = Alternate
- SE = Special exempt
- PR = Protected ranking
- ITF = ITF entry
- JE = Junior exempt
- w/o = Walkover
- r = Retired
- d = Defaulted
- SR = Special ranking

=== Finals ===
Semifinals
WC	(Colombia) Camila Osorio	6	6
Q	(France) Harmony Tan	1	2
(Bulgaria) Viktoriya Tomova	3	5
5	(Slovenia) Tamara Zidanšek	6	7

Final
WC	(Colombia) Camila Osorio	5	6	6
5	(Slovenia) Tamara Zidanšek	7	3	4

=== Top half ===
First round
1	(China) S Zheng	6	6
(United States) UM Arconada	3	1
(Switzerland) S Vögele	3	6	6
Q	(France) C Paquet	6	1	4
WC	(Colombia) C Osorio	6	6
(United States) S Vickery	3	2
(Switzerland) L Küng	6	4	4
7	(Czech Republic) T Martincová	4	6	6
4	(Denmark) C Tauson	6	3	2
Q	(Chile) D Seguel	3	6	6
(Romania) M Buzărnescu	3	3
Q	(France) H Tan	6	6
Q	(Spain) L Arruabarrena	6	6
WC	(Colombia) J Plazas	0	1
(United States) K Ahn	3	0
6	(Italy) J Paolini	6	6

Second round
1	(China) S Zheng	4	1
(Switzerland) S Vögele	6	6
WC	(Colombia) C Osorio	6	6
7	(Czech Republic) T Martincová	3	3
Q	(Chile) D Seguel	4	6^{3}
Q	(France) H Tan	6	7^{7}
Q	(Spain) L Arruabarrena	2	6	6
6	(Italy) J Paolini	6	4	2

Quarterfinals
(Switzerland) S Vögele	3	5
WC	(Colombia) C Osorio	6	7
Q	(France) H Tan	6	6
Q	(Spain) L Arruabarrena	1	4

Semifinals
WC	(Colombia) C Osorio	6	6
Q	(France) H Tan	1	2

=== Bottom half ===
First round
8	(China) Y Wang	6	5	7
WC	(Colombia) E Arango	4	7	5
(Germany) A-L Friedsam	2	3
(Bulgaria) V Tomova	6	6
(Spain) C Bucșa	3	2
Q	(Spain) N Párrizas Díaz	6	6
(Romania) I Bara	4	7	4
3	(Netherlands) A Rus	6	5	6
5	(Slovenia) T Zidanšek	6	7
(Russia) A Kalinskaya	0	5
(Australia) A Sharma	6	5	1
Q	(Italy) G Gatto-Monticone	4	7	6
(Slovakia) AK Schmiedlová	4	6	1
(Spain) A Bolsova	6	3	6
(Italy) S Errani	7	7
2	(Spain) S Sorribes Tormo	5	5

Second round
8	(China) Y Wang	3	3
(Bulgaria) V Tomova	6	6
Q	(Spain) N Párrizas Díaz	7^{7}	2	6
3	(Netherlands) A Rus	6^{4}	6	1
5	(Slovenia) T Zidanšek	6	6
Q	(Italy) G Gatto-Monticone	2	3
(Spain) A Bolsova	4	4
(Italy) S Errani	6	6

Quarterfinals
(Bulgaria) V Tomova	5	6	6
Q	(Spain) N Párrizas Díaz	7	2	4
5	(Slovenia) T Zidanšek	6	6
(Italy) S Errani	3	4

Semifinals
(Bulgaria) V Tomova	3	5
5	(Slovenia) T Zidanšek	6	7

== Qualifying ==
=== Seeds ===
1. (Australia) Arina Rodionova (first round)
2. (Spain) Lara Arruabarrena (qualified)
3. (Italy) Giulia Gatto-Monticone (qualified)
4. (Spain) Nuria Párrizas Díaz (qualified)
5. (France) Clara Burel (first round)
6. (France) Chloé Paquet (qualified)
7. (France) Harmony Tan (qualified)
8. (Georgia (country)) Mariam Bolkvadze (first round)
9. (United States) Robin Anderson (qualifying competition)
10. (Serbia) Natalija Kostić (first round)
11. (United States) Danielle Lao (first round)
12. (Russia) Marina Melnikova (qualifying competition)

=== Qualifiers ===
1. (France) Harmony Tan
2. (Spain) Lara Arruabarrena
3. (Italy) Giulia Gatto-Monticone
4. (Spain) Nuria Párrizas Díaz
5. (Chile) Daniela Seguel
6. (France) Chloé Paquet

=== Draw ===
==== First qualifier ====
First round
1	(Australia) Arina Rodionova	4	6^{2}
(Slovenia) Dalila Jakupović	6	7^{7}
(Russia) Yana Sizikova	1	6	4
7	(France) Harmony Tan	6	4	6

Qualifying competition
(Slovenia) Dalila Jakupović	2	2
7	(France) Harmony Tan	6	6

==== Second qualifier ====
First round
2	(Spain) Lara Arruabarrena	6	6
PR	(Canada) Carol Zhao	0	0
WC	(Colombia) Yuliana Monroy	7^{7}	2	6
10	(Serbia) Natalija Kostić	6^{5}	6	4

Qualifying competition
2	(Spain) Lara Arruabarrena	6	6
WC	(Colombia) Yuliana Monroy	0	0

==== Third qualifier ====
First round
3	(Italy) Giulia Gatto-Monticone	6	6
WC	(Colombia) Kelly Vargas González	3	0
(Belgium) Marie Benoît	6	6
8	(Georgia (country)) Mariam Bolkvadze	4	0

Qualifying competition
3	(Italy) Giulia Gatto-Monticone	4	7	6
(Belgium) Marie Benoît	6	5	3

==== Fourth qualifier ====
First round
4	(Spain) Nuria Párrizas Díaz	4	6	6
WC	(Colombia) Mariana Manyoma	6	3	0
(Poland) Katarzyna Piter	5	0
12	(Russia) Marina Melnikova	7	6

Qualifying competition
4	(Spain) Nuria Párrizas Díaz	7^{7}	4	6
12	(Russia) Marina Melnikova	6^{2}	6	1

==== Fifth qualifier ====
First round
5	(France) Clara Burel	3	6	4
(Germany) Katharina Gerlach	6	1	6
(Chile) Daniela Seguel	6	6
11	(United States) Danielle Lao	1	2

Qualifying competition
(Germany) Katharina Gerlach	1	1
(Chile) Daniela Seguel	6	6

==== Sixth qualifier ====
First round
6	(France) Chloé Paquet	6	6
WC	(Colombia) Antonia Samudio	2	3
(Poland) Paula Kania-Choduń	1	4
9	(United States) Robin Anderson	6	6

Qualifying competition
6	(France) Chloé Paquet	3	6	6
9	(United States) Robin Anderson	6	3	2
