= 2021 Copa Colsanitas =

- Date: 5–11 April
- Edition: 23rd
- Category: WTA 250 tournaments
- Draw: 32S / 16D
- Prize money: $235,238
- Surface: Clay
- Location: Bogotá, Colombia

Champions

Singles
- (Colombia) Camila Osorio

Doubles
- (France) Elixane Lechemia / (United States) Ingrid Neel
← 2019 ·	Copa Colsanitas	· 2022 →

The 2021 Copa Colsanitas was a women's tennis tournament played on outdoor clay courts. It was the 23rd edition of the Copa Colsanitas and part of the 250 category of the 2021 WTA Tour. It took place at the Country Club in Bogotá, Colombia, from 5 April until 11 April 2021. Unseeded Camila Osorio, who entered the main draw on a wildcard, won the singles title.

== Finals ==
=== Singles ===
(Colombia) Camila Osorio defeated (Slovenia) Tamara Zidanšek 5–7, 6–3, 6–4

- It was Osorio's only singles title of the year and the 1st of her career.

=== Doubles ===
(France) Elixane Lechemia / (United States) Ingrid Neel defeated (Romania) Mihaela Buzărnescu / (Germany) Anna-Lena Friedsam 6–3, 6–4

== Points and prize money ==
=== Point distribution ===
Event	W	F	SF	QF	Round of 16	Round of 32	Q	Q2	Q1
Singles	280	180	110	60	30	1	18	12	1
Doubles	280	180	110	60	1	—	—	—	—

=== Prize money ===
Event	W	F	SF	QF	Round of 16	Round of 32	Q2	Q1
Singles	$29,200	$16,398	$10,100	$5,800	$3,675	$2,675	$1,950	$1,270
Doubles*	$10,300	$6,000	$3,800	$2,300	$1,750	—	—	—

_{*per team}

== Singles main-draw entrants ==
=== Seeds ===
Country	Player	Ranking^{1}	Seed
CHN	Zheng Saisai	53	1
ESP	Sara Sorribes Tormo	58	2
NED	Arantxa Rus	84	3
DEN	Clara Tauson	96	4
SLO	Tamara Zidanšek	97	5
ITA	Jasmine Paolini	101	6
CZE	Tereza Martincová	105	7
CHN	Wang Yafan	106	8

- ^{1} Rankings as of 22 March 2021.

=== Other entrants ===
The following players received wildcards into the main draw:

- (Colombia) Emiliana Arango
- (Colombia) Camila Osorio
- (Colombia) Jessica Plazas

The following players received entry from the qualifying draw:

- (Spain) Lara Arruabarrena
- (Italy) Giulia Gatto-Monticone
- (Spain) Nuria Párrizas Díaz
- (France) Chloé Paquet
- (Chile) Daniela Seguel
- (France) Harmony Tan

=== Withdrawals ===
Before the tournament

- (France) Caroline Garcia → replaced by (Switzerland) Leonie Küng
- (Slovenia) Kaja Juvan → replaced by (Romania) Irina Bara
- (Argentina) Nadia Podoroska → replaced by (United States) Sachia Vickery
- (Egypt) Mayar Sherif → replaced by (Bulgaria) Viktoriya Tomova
- (Serbia) Nina Stojanović → replaced by (Australia) Astra Sharma
- (Romania) Patricia Maria Țig → replaced by (Romania) Mihaela Buzărnescu

== Doubles main-draw entrants ==
=== Seeds ===
Country	Player	Country	Player	Rank^{1}	Seed
NED	Arantxa Rus	SLO	Tamara Zidanšek	122	1
AUS	Arina Rodionova	NED	Rosalie van der Hoek	171	2
ROU	Mihaela Buzărnescu	GER	Anna-Lena Friedsam	181	3
GBR	Naomi Broady	CHN	Zheng Saisai	183	4

- Rankings as of 22 March 2021.

=== Other entrants ===
The following pairs received wildcards into the doubles main draw:

- (Colombia) Emiliana Arango / (Colombia) Camila Osorio
- (Colombia) Jessica Plazas / (Colombia) Antonia Samudio

=== Withdrawals ===
Before the tournament

- (United States) Kaitlyn Christian / (United States) Sabrina Santamaria → replaced by (Indonesia) Beatrice Gumulya / (Indonesia) Jessy Rompies
- (Spain) Sara Sorribes Tormo / (Argentina) Nadia Podoroska → replaced by (United States) Emina Bektas / (United Kingdom) Tara Moore
