= 2017 Copa Colsanitas – Doubles =

Tennis tournament

Doubles
- 2017 Copa Colsanitas

Final
- Champions: (Brazil) Beatriz Haddad Maia (Argentina) Nadia Podoroska
- Runners-up: (Paraguay) Verónica Cepede Royg (Poland) Magda Linette
- Score: 6–3, 7–6^{(7–4)}

Details
- Draw: 16
- Seeds: 4

Events
Singles	Doubles
← 2016 ·	Copa Colsanitas	· 2018 →

Lara Arruabarrena and Tatjana Maria were the defending champions, but chose not to compete together. Arruabarrena played alongside Mariana Duque Mariño, but lost in the quarterfinals to Verónica Cepede Royg and Magda Linette. Maria teamed up with Natela Dzalamidze, but lost in the quarterfinals to Irina Khromacheva and Nina Stojanović.

Beatriz Haddad Maia and Nadia Podoroska won the title, defeating Cepede Royg and Linette in the final, 6–3, 7–6^{(7–4)}.

== Seeds ==
1. (Serbia) Aleksandra Krunić / (Czech Republic) Kateřina Siniaková (quarterfinals)
2. (Russia) Natela Dzalamidze / (Germany) Tatjana Maria (quarterfinals)
3. (Argentina) María Irigoyen / (Poland) Paula Kania (quarterfinals)
4. (Spain) Lara Arruabarrena / (Colombia) Mariana Duque Mariño (quarterfinals)

== Draw ==
=== Key ===
- Q = Qualifier
- WC = Wild card
- LL = Lucky loser
- Alt = Alternate
- SE = Special exempt
- PR = Protected ranking
- ITF = ITF entry
- JE = Junior exempt
- w/o = Walkover
- r = Retired
- d = Defaulted
- SR = Special ranking

First round
1	(Serbia) A Krunić (Czech Republic) K Siniaková	7^{7}	3	[10]
(Australia) M Adamczak (United States) N Melichar	6^{3}	6	[8]
WC	(United States) A Mayo (United States) S Nemtsova	1	4
(Argentina) C Pella (Chile) D Seguel	6	6
3	(Argentina) M Irigoyen (Poland) P Kania	7	5	[10]
(United States) I Falconi (United States) G Min	5	7	[7]
(Slovenia) D Jakupović (Argentina) G Pérez Rojas	2	1
WC	(Brazil) B Haddad Maia (Argentina) N Podoroska	6	6
(Paraguay) V Cepede Royg (Poland) M Linette	6	6
(United States) J Cako (China) J Lu	0	3
(Germany) N Geuer (Switzerland) C Perrin	6	5	[9]
4	(Spain) L Arruabarrena (Colombia) M Duque Mariño	4	7	[11]
(Greece) M Sakkari (Spain) S Sorribes Tormo	6^{5}	6^{1}
(Russia) I Khromacheva (Serbia) N Stojanović	7^{7}	7^{7}
(United States) A Weinhold (United States) C Whoriskey	5	6	[7]
2	(Russia) N Dzalamidze (Germany) T Maria	7	4	[10]

Quarterfinals
1	(Serbia) A Krunić (Czech Republic) K Siniaková	2	6	[7]
(Argentina) C Pella (Chile) D Seguel	6	2	[10]
3	(Argentina) M Irigoyen (Poland) P Kania	3	4
WC	(Brazil) B Haddad Maia (Argentina) N Podoroska	6	6
(Paraguay) V Cepede Royg (Poland) M Linette	6	6
4	(Spain) L Arruabarrena (Colombia) M Duque Mariño	3	3
(Russia) I Khromacheva (Serbia) N Stojanović	6	6
2	(Russia) N Dzalamidze (Germany) T Maria	4	3

Semifinals
(Argentina) C Pella (Chile) D Seguel	6	5	[6]
WC	(Brazil) B Haddad Maia (Argentina) N Podoroska	2	7	[10]
(Paraguay) V Cepede Royg (Poland) M Linette	6	3	[10]
(Russia) I Khromacheva (Serbia) N Stojanović	1	6	[8]

Final
WC	(Brazil) B Haddad Maia (Argentina) N Podoroska	6	7^{7}
(Paraguay) V Cepede Royg (Poland) M Linette	3	6^{4}
