= 2018 Copa Colsanitas – Doubles =

Tennis tournament

Doubles
- 2018 Copa Colsanitas

Final
- Champions: (Slovenia) Dalila Jakupović (Russia) Irina Khromacheva
- Runners-up: (Colombia) Mariana Duque Mariño (Argentina) Nadia Podoroska
- Score: 6–3, 6–4

Details
- Draw: 16
- Seeds: 4

Events
Singles	Doubles
← 2017 ·	Copa Colsanitas	· 2019 →

Beatriz Haddad Maia and Nadia Podoroska were the defending champions, but Haddad Maia could not participate this year due to a right wrist injury. Podoroska played alongside Mariana Duque Mariño, but lost in the final to Dalila Jakupović and Irina Khromacheva, 3–6, 4–6.

== Seeds ==
1. (Japan) Nao Hibino / (Japan) Miyu Kato (first round)
2. (Slovenia) Dalila Jakupović / (Russia) Irina Khromacheva (champions)
3. (Spain) Lara Arruabarrena / (United States) Alison Riske (semifinals)
4. (United States) Kaitlyn Christian / (United States) Sabrina Santamaria (first round)

== Draw ==
=== Key ===
- Q = Qualifier
- WC = Wild card
- LL = Lucky loser
- Alt = Alternate
- SE = Special exempt
- PR = Protected ranking
- ITF = ITF entry
- JE = Junior exempt
- w/o = Walkover
- r = Retired
- d = Defaulted
- SR = Special ranking

=== Draw ===
First round
1	(Japan) N Hibino (Japan) M Kato	6	5	[9]
(Colombia) M Duque Mariño (Argentina) N Podoroska	2	7	[11]
WC	(Colombia) M Herazo González (Colombia) Y Lizarazo	4	2
(United States) J Cako (Sweden) C Lister	6	6
4	(United States) K Christian (United States) S Santamaria	3	2
(Belgium) Y Bonaventure (Mexico) V Rodríguez	6	6
WC	(Colombia) C Osorio (Colombia) J Plazas	1	1
(Poland) M Linette (Spain) S Sorribes Tormo	6	6
(Croatia) T Mrdeža (Belgium) M Zanevska	6	6
(Argentina) M Irigoyen (Chile) D Seguel	2	4
(United States) N Gibbs (Canada) C Zhao	6^{6}	0
3	(Spain) L Arruabarrena (United States) A Riske	7^{8}	6
(Australia) P Hon (Russia) Y Sizikova	2	6	[11]
(Spain) G García Pérez (Mexico) R Zarazúa	6	3	[9]
(United States) D Krawczyk (Mexico) G Olmos	3	5
2	(Slovenia) D Jakupović (Russia) I Khromacheva	6	7

Quarterfinals
(Colombia) M Duque Mariño (Argentina) N Podoroska	6	6
(United States) J Cako (Sweden) C Lister	4	4
(Belgium) Y Bonaventure (Mexico) V Rodríguez	4	3
(Poland) M Linette (Spain) S Sorribes Tormo	6	6
(Croatia) T Mrdeža (Belgium) M Zanevska	4	7	[8]
3	(Spain) L Arruabarrena (United States) A Riske	6	5	[10]
(Australia) P Hon (Russia) Y Sizikova	6	3	[10]
2	(Slovenia) D Jakupović (Russia) I Khromacheva	3	6	[12]

Semifinals
(Colombia) M Duque Mariño (Argentina) N Podoroska	4	6	[10]
(Poland) M Linette (Spain) S Sorribes Tormo	6	2	[8]
3	(Spain) L Arruabarrena (United States) A Riske	4	0
2	(Slovenia) D Jakupović (Russia) I Khromacheva	6	6

Final
(Colombia) M Duque Mariño (Argentina) N Podoroska	3	4
2	(Slovenia) D Jakupović (Russia) I Khromacheva	6	6
