= 2016 Copa Colsanitas – Doubles =

Tennis tournament

Doubles
- 2016 Copa Colsanitas

Final
- Champions: (Spain) Lara Arruabarrena (Germany) Tatjana Maria
- Runners-up: (Brazil) Gabriela Cé (Venezuela) Andrea Gámiz
- Score: 6–2, 4–6, [10–8]

Details
- Draw: 16
- Seeds: 4

Events
Singles	Doubles
← 2015 ·	Copa Colsanitas	· 2017 →

Paula Cristina Gonçalves and Beatriz Haddad Maia were the defending champions, but Haddad Maia chose not to participate this year. Gonçalves played alongside Sanaz Marand, but lost in the first round to Sílvia Soler Espinosa and Anna Tatishvili.
Lara Arruabarrena and Tatjana Maria won the title, defeating Gabriela Cé and Andrea Gámiz in the final, 6–2, 4–6, [10–8].

== Seeds ==
1. (Spain) Lara Arruabarrena / (Germany) Tatjana Maria (champions)
2. (United States) Irina Falconi / (Russia) Alexandra Panova (first round)
3. (Paraguay) Verónica Cepede Royg / (Russia) Marina Melnikova (first round)
4. (Brazil) Paula Cristina Gonçalves / (United States) Sanaz Marand (first round)

== Draw ==
=== Key ===
- Q = Qualifier
- WC = Wild card
- LL = Lucky loser
- Alt = Alternate
- SE = Special exempt
- PR = Protected ranking
- ITF = ITF entry
- JE = Junior exempt
- w/o = Walkover
- r = Retired
- d = Defaulted
- SR = Special ranking

First round
1	(Spain) L Arruabarrena (Germany) T Maria	6	7
(Turkey) İ Soylu (Switzerland) JB Teichmann	4	5
(Spain) G García Pérez (Spain) L Pous Tió	6^{5}	6	[7]
(United States) N Melichar (Sweden) R Peterson	7^{7}	3	[10]
4	(Brazil) PC Gonçalves (United States) S Marand	6^{5}	3
(Spain) S Soler Espinosa (United States) A Tatishvili	7^{7}	6
(Spain) L Domínguez Lino (Colombia) M Duque Mariño	6	3	[6]
(Switzerland) A Sadiković (United States) M Sanchez	4	6	[10]
(Argentina) C Pella (Mexico) R Zarazúa	6	6
(Mexico) V Rodríguez (Romania) PM Țig	3	4
(Brazil) G Cé (Venezuela) A Gámiz	6	7
3	(Paraguay) V Cepede Royg (Russia) M Melnikova	2	5
WC	(Venezuela) N Echeverría Alam (Colombia) Y Lizarazo	6	7
(United Kingdom) T Moore (Switzerland) C Perrin	1	5
(Bulgaria) A Naydenova (Chile) D Seguel	7	6
2	(United States) I Falconi (Russia) A Panova	5	4

Quarterfinals
1	(Spain) L Arruabarrena (Germany) T Maria	2	6	[10]
(United States) N Melichar (Sweden) R Peterson	6	3	[7]
(Spain) S Soler Espinosa (United States) A Tatishvili	6	3	[5]
(Switzerland) A Sadiković (United States) M Sanchez	3	6	[10]
(Argentina) C Pella (Mexico) R Zarazúa	4	6	[8]
(Brazil) G Cé (Venezuela) A Gámiz	6	4	[10]
WC	(Venezuela) N Echeverría Alam (Colombia) Y Lizarazo	5	6^{3}
(Bulgaria) A Naydenova (Chile) D Seguel	7	7^{7}

Semifinals
1	(Spain) L Arruabarrena (Germany) T Maria	6	6
(Switzerland) A Sadiković (United States) M Sanchez	2	1
(Brazil) G Cé (Venezuela) A Gámiz	3	6	[10]
(Bulgaria) A Naydenova (Chile) D Seguel	6	3	[5]

Final
1	(Spain) L Arruabarrena (Germany) T Maria	6	4	[10]
(Brazil) G Cé (Venezuela) A Gámiz	2	6	[8]
