= 2017 Copa Colsanitas =

- Date: 10–15 April
- Edition: 20th
- Category: WTA International
- Draw: 32S / 16D
- Prize money: $250,000
- Surface: Clay / outdoor
- Location: Bogotá, Colombia

Champions

Singles
- (Italy) Francesca Schiavone

Doubles
- (Brazil) Beatriz Haddad Maia / (Argentina) Nadia Podoroska
← 2016 ·	Copa Colsanitas	· 2018 →

The 2017 Copa Colsanitas (also known as the 2017 Claro Open Colsanitas) was a women's tennis tournament played on outdoor clay courts. It was the 20th edition of the Copa Colsanitas, and part of the International category of the 2017 WTA Tour. It took place at the Centro de Alto Rendimiento in Bogotá, Colombia, from April 10 through April 15, 2017.

== Finals ==
=== Singles ===
- (Italy) Francesca Schiavone defeated (Spain) Lara Arruabarrena, 6–4, 7–5

=== Doubles ===
- (Brazil) Beatriz Haddad Maia / (Argentina) Nadia Podoroska defeated (Paraguay) Verónica Cepede Royg / (Poland) Magda Linette, 6–3, 7–6^{(7–4)}

== Points and prize money ==
=== Point distribution ===
Event	W	F	SF	QF	Round of 16	Round of 32	Q	Q3	Q2	Q1
Singles	280	180	110	60	30	1	18	14	10	1
Doubles	280	180	110	60	1	—	—	—	—	—

=== Prize money ===
Event	W	F	SF	QF	Round of 16	Round of 32	Q3	Q2	Q1
Singles	$43,000	$21,400	$11,300	$5,900	$3,310	$1,925	$1,005	$730	$530
Doubles	$12,300	$6,400	$3,435	$1,820	$960	—	—	—	—

== Singles main-draw entrants ==
=== Seeds ===
Country	Player	Rank^{1}	Seed
NED	Kiki Bertens	21	1
CZE	Kateřina Siniaková	36	2
SWE	Johanna Larsson	57	3
ESP	Lara Arruabarrena	65	4
POL	Magda Linette	83	5
ROU	Patricia Maria Țig	85	6
RUS	Ekaterina Alexandrova	86	7
GRE	Maria Sakkari	91	8

- ^{1} Rankings as of 3 April 2017.

=== Other entrants ===
The following players received wildcards into the singles main draw:

- (Colombia) Emiliana Arango
- (United States) Alyssa Mayo
- (Italy) Francesca Schiavone

The following players received entry from the qualifying draw:

- (Netherlands) Cindy Burger
- (France) Fiona Ferro
- (Brazil) Beatriz Haddad Maia
- (Switzerland) Conny Perrin
- (Argentina) Nadia Podoroska
- (Switzerland) Jil Teichmann

=== Withdrawals ===
Before the tournament

- (Luxembourg) Mandy Minella →replaced by (United States) Grace Min
- (China) Peng Shuai →replaced by (Paraguay) Verónica Cepede Royg
- (United States) Anna Tatishvili →replaced by (United States) Sachia Vickery

== Doubles main-draw entrants ==
=== Seeds ===
Country	Player	Country	Player	Rank^{1}	Seed
SRB	Aleksandra Krunić	CZE	Kateřina Siniaková	66	1
RUS	Natela Dzalamidze	GER	Tatjana Maria	157	2
ARG	María Irigoyen	POL	Paula Kania	157	3
ESP	Lara Arruabarrena	COL	Mariana Duque Mariño	219	4

- Rankings are as of April 3, 2017.

=== Other entrants ===
The following pairs received wildcards into the doubles main draw:

- (Brazil) Beatriz Haddad Maia / (Argentina) Nadia Podoroska
- (United States) Alyssa Mayo / (United States) Stephanie Nemtsova
