= 2019 Copa Colsanitas – Singles =

Singles
- 2019 Copa Colsanitas

Final
- Champion: (United States) Amanda Anisimova
- Runner-up: (Australia) Astra Sharma
- Score: 4–6, 6–4, 6–1

Events
Singles	Doubles
- Copa Colsanitas

Anna Karolína Schmiedlová was the defending champion,but lost in the second round to Beatriz Haddad Maia.

Amanda Anisimova won her first WTA Tour title, defeating Astra Sharma in the final, 4–6, 6–4, 6–1.

== Seeds ==
1. (Latvia) Jeļena Ostapenko (first round)
2. (Croatia) Petra Martić (withdrew)
3. (Germany) Tatjana Maria (withdrew)
4. (Slovakia) Anna Karolína Schmiedlová (second round)
5. (Slovenia) Tamara Zidanšek (quarterfinals)
6. (United States) Amanda Anisimova (champion)
7. (Spain) Sara Sorribes Tormo (quarterfinals)
8. (Poland) Magda Linette (second round)
9. (Slovenia) Dalila Jakupović (withdrew)
10. (Serbia) Ivana Jorović (withdrew)
11. (Spain) Lara Arruabarrena (semifinals)

== Draw ==
Key

- Q = Qualifier
- WC = Wild card
- LL = Lucky loser
- Alt = Alternate
- ITF = ITF entry
- PR = Protected ranking
- SR = Special ranking
- SE = Special exempt
- JE = Junior exempt
- JR = Junior Accelerator Programme entrant
- CO = College Accelerator Programme entrant
- NG = Next Gen Accelerator Program entrant
- w/o = Walkover
- r = Retired
- d = Defaulted

=== Finals ===
Semifinals
6	(United States) Amanda Anisimova	4	7^{7}	6
Q	(Brazil) Beatriz Haddad Maia	6	6^{2}	2
11	(Spain) Lara Arruabarrena	5	1
(Australia) Astra Sharma	7	6

Final
6	(United States) Amanda Anisimova	4	6	6
(Australia) Astra Sharma	6	4	1

=== Top half ===
First round
1	(Latvia) J Ostapenko	6	6^{5}	5
LL	(United States) K Ahn	2	7^{7}	7
(Switzerland) C Perrin	4	4
WC	(Colombia) C Osorio	6	6
LL	(Bulgaria) E Kostova	3	1
(United States) V Lepchenko	6	6
WC	(Germany) S Lisicki	6	3	2
6	(United States) A Anisimova	4	6	6
4	(Slovakia) AK Schmiedlová	6	6
(Belgium) Y Bonaventure	2	4
Q	(Brazil) B Haddad Maia	6	7
(Germany) L Siegemund	2	5
Q	(France) C Paquet	2	7^{9}	2
(Romania) A Bogdan	6	6^{7}	6
(United States) C McHale	4	4
7	(Spain) S Sorribes Tormo	6	6

Second round
LL	(United States) K Ahn	4	7^{8}	3
WC	(Colombia) C Osorio	6	6^{6}	6
(United States) V Lepchenko	4	4
6	(United States) A Anisimova	6	6
4	(Slovakia) AK Schmiedlová	6^{3}	6^{6}
Q	(Brazil) B Haddad Maia	7^{7}	7^{8}
(Romania) A Bogdan	4	6	4
7	(Spain) S Sorribes Tormo	6	4	6

Quarterfinals
WC	(Colombia) C Osorio	2	6	3
6	(United States) A Anisimova	6	1	6
Q	(Brazil) B Haddad Maia	6^{6}	6	6
7	(Spain) S Sorribes Tormo	7^{8}	2	3

Semifinals
6	(United States) A Anisimova	4	7^{7}	6
Q	(Brazil) B Haddad Maia	6	6^{2}	2

=== Bottom half ===
First round
5	(Slovenia) T Zidanšek	4	6	6
(Russia) I Khromacheva	6	1	4
LL	(Japan) H Kuwata	4	2
(United States) S Vickery	6	6
Q	(Italy) J Paolini	6	3	6
LL	(United States) F Di Lorenzo	2	6	4
(Hungary) T Babos	7^{9}	4	1
11	(Spain) L Arruabarrena	6^{7}	6	6
8	(Poland) M Linette	2	7^{7}	6
Q	(Spain) A Bolsova	6	6^{5}	0
PR	(United States) S Rogers	3	7^{8}	1
(Australia) A Sharma	6	6^{6}	6
WC	(Colombia) E Arango	2	4
Q	(Netherlands) B Schoofs	6	6
Q	(Romania) I Bara	6	2	3
LL	(Italy) S Errani	4	6	6

Second round
5	(Slovenia) T Zidanšek	6	6
(United States) S Vickery	2	0
Q	(Italy) J Paolini	6^{4}	1
11	(Spain) L Arruabarrena	7^{7}	6
8	(Poland) M Linette	4	3
(Australia) A Sharma	6	6
Q	(Netherlands) B Schoofs	2	1
LL	(Italy) S Errani	6	6

Quarterfinals
5	(Slovenia) T Zidanšek	4	2
11	(Spain) L Arruabarrena	6	6
(Australia) A Sharma	6	7
LL	(Italy) S Errani	1	5

Semifinals
11	(Spain) L Arruabarrena	5	1
(Australia) A Sharma	7	6

== Qualifying ==
=== Seeds ===
1. (Spain) Aliona Bolsova (qualified)
2. (United States) Danielle Lao (first round)
3. (Netherlands) Bibiane Schoofs (qualified)
4. (Italy) Martina Trevisan (first round)
5. (Romania) Irina Bara (qualified)
6. (United States) Francesca Di Lorenzo (qualifying competition, lucky loser)
7. (Brazil) Beatriz Haddad Maia (qualified)
8. (Russia) Sofya Zhuk (first round)
9. (Italy) Jasmine Paolini (qualified)
10. (United States) Kristie Ahn (qualifying competition, lucky loser)
11. (Germany) Anna Zaja (first round)
12. (Australia) Zoe Hives (first round)

=== Qualifiers ===
1. (Spain) Aliona Bolsova
2. (Italy) Jasmine Paolini
3. (Netherlands) Bibiane Schoofs
4. (France) Chloé Paquet
5. (Romania) Irina Bara
6. (Brazil) Beatriz Haddad Maia

=== Lucky losers ===
1. (United States) Francesca Di Lorenzo
2. (United States) Kristie Ahn
3. (Bulgaria) Elitsa Kostova
4. (Japan) Hiroko Kuwata
5. (Italy) Sara Errani

=== Draw ===
==== First qualifier ====
First round
1	(Spain) Aliona Bolsova	7	6
(Russia) Yana Sizikova	5	0
WC	(Colombia) María Herazo González	6	2	6
11	(Germany) Anna Zaja	1	6	3

Qualifying competition
1	(Spain) Aliona Bolsova	1	6	6
WC	(Colombia) María Herazo González	6	2	0

==== Second qualifier ====
First round
2	(United States) Danielle Lao	4	6	3
(Italy) Sara Errani	6	3	6
WC	(United States) Jane Wasserson	0	1
9	(Italy) Jasmine Paolini	6	6

Qualifying competition
(Italy) Sara Errani	2	6	3
9	(Italy) Jasmine Paolini	6	3	6

==== Third qualifier ====
First round
3	(Netherlands) Bibiane Schoofs	6	6
Alt	(Chile) Alexa Guarachi	1	0
(Serbia) Natalija Kostić	5	6	0
10	(United States) Kristie Ahn	7	2	6

Qualifying competition
3	(Netherlands) Bibiane Schoofs	7	6
10	(United States) Kristie Ahn	5	3

==== Fourth qualifier ====
First round
4	(Italy) Martina Trevisan	1	6	5
(Japan) Hiroko Kuwata	6	4	7
(France) Chloé Paquet	6	2	6
8	(Russia) Sofya Zhuk	4	6	3

Qualifying competition
(Japan) Hiroko Kuwata	6	1	5
(France) Chloé Paquet	3	6	7

==== Fifth qualifier ====
First round
5	(Romania) Irina Bara	6	6
WC	(Colombia) Jessica Plazas	2	0
(Bulgaria) Elitsa Kostova	6^{8}	7	6
12	(Australia) Zoe Hives	7^{10}	5	0

Qualifying competition
5	(Romania) Irina Bara	3	6	6
(Bulgaria) Elitsa Kostova	6	2	3

==== Sixth qualifier ====
First round
6	(United States) Francesca Di Lorenzo	6	6
WC	(Colombia) Antonia Samudio	1	0
(Mexico) Renata Zarazúa	6	2	3
7	(Brazil) Beatriz Haddad Maia	4	6	6

Qualifying competition
6	(United States) Francesca Di Lorenzo	6	5	1
7	(Brazil) Beatriz Haddad Maia	4	7	6
