= 2019 Copa Colsanitas =

- Date: 8–14 April
- Edition: 22nd
- Category: WTA International
- Draw: 32S / 16D
- Prize money: $250,000
- Surface: Clay / outdoor
- Location: Bogotá, Colombia

Champions

Singles
- (United States) Amanda Anisimova

Doubles
- (Australia) Zoe Hives / (Australia) Astra Sharma
← 2018 ·	Copa Colsanitas	· 2021 →

The 2019 Copa Colsanitas (also known as the 2019 Claro Open Colsanitas for sponsorship reasons) was a women's tennis tournament played on outdoor clay courts. It was the 22nd edition of the Copa Colsanitas and part of the International category of the 2019 WTA Tour. It took place at the Centro de Alto Rendimiento in Bogotá, Colombia, from April 8 through April 14, 2019.

== Finals ==
=== Singles ===
- (United States) Amanda Anisimova defeated (Australia) Astra Sharma, 4–6, 6–4, 6–1

=== Doubles ===
- (Australia) Zoe Hives / (Australia) Astra Sharma defeated (United States) Hayley Carter / (United States) Ena Shibahara, 6–1, 6–2

== Points and prize money ==
=== Point distribution ===
Event	W	F	SF	QF	Round of 16	Round of 32	Q	Q2	Q1
Singles	280	180	110	60	30	1	18	12	1
Doubles	280	180	110	60	1	—	—	—	—

=== Prize money ===
Event	W	F	SF	QF	Round of 16	Round of 32	Q2	Q1
Singles	$43,000	$21,400	$11,500	$6,175	$3,400	$2,100	$1,020	$600
Doubles*	$12,300	$6,400	$3,435	$1,820	$960	—	—	—

_{*per team}

== Singles main-draw entrants ==
=== Seeds ===
Country	Player	Ranking^{1}	Seed
LAT	Jeļena Ostapenko	31	1
~~CRO~~	~~Petra Martić~~	~~40~~	~~2~~
~~GER~~	~~Tatjana Maria~~	~~59~~	~~3~~
SVK	Anna Karolína Schmiedlová	66	4
SLO	Tamara Zidanšek	67	5
USA	Amanda Anisimova	76	6
ESP	Sara Sorribes Tormo	79	7
POL	Magda Linette	85	8
~~SLO~~	~~Dalila Jakupović~~	~~92~~	~~9~~
~~SRB~~	~~Ivana Jorović~~	~~100~~	~~10~~
ESP	Lara Arruabarrena	102	11

- ^{1} Rankings as of 1 April 2019.

=== Other entrants ===
The following players received wildcards into the main draw:

- (Colombia) Emiliana Arango
- (Germany) Sabine Lisicki
- (Colombia) Camila Osorio

The following player received entry using a protected ranking into the main draw:

- (United States) Shelby Rogers

The following players received entry from the qualifying draw:

- (Romania) Irina Bara
- (Spain) Aliona Bolsova
- (Brazil) Beatriz Haddad Maia
- (Italy) Jasmine Paolini
- (France) Chloé Paquet
- (Netherlands) Bibiane Schoofs

The following players received entry as lucky losers:

- (United States) Kristie Ahn
- (United States) Francesca Di Lorenzo
- (Italy) Sara Errani
- (Bulgaria) Elitsa Kostova
- (Japan) Hiroko Kuwata

=== Withdrawals ===
- (Canada) Eugenie Bouchard → replaced by (United States) Varvara Lepchenko
- (Kazakhstan) Zarina Diyas → replaced by (United States) Kristie Ahn
- (Japan) Misaki Doi → replaced by (Russia) Irina Khromacheva
- (Israel) Julia Glushko → replaced by (Australia) Astra Sharma
- (Japan) Nao Hibino → replaced by (United States) Sachia Vickery
- (Slovenia) Dalila Jakupović → replaced by (Italy) Sara Errani
- (Serbia) Ivana Jorović → replaced by (Japan) Hiroko Kuwata
- (Germany) Tatjana Maria→ replaced by (Bulgaria) Elitsa Kostova
- (Croatia) Petra Martić → replaced by (United States) Francesca Di Lorenzo

== Doubles main-draw entrants ==
=== Seeds ===
Country	Player	Country	Player	Rank^{1}	Seed
~~SLO~~	~~Dalila Jakupović~~	~~RUS~~	~~Irina Khromacheva~~	~~90~~	~~1~~
ESP	Lara Arruabarrena	ESP	Sara Sorribes Tormo	114	2
CHI	Alexa Guarachi	USA	Desirae Krawczyk	125	3
AUS	Monique Adamczak	AUS	Jessica Moore	145	4

- Rankings as of 1 April 2019.

=== Other entrants ===
The following pairs received wildcards into the doubles main draw:

- ~~(Colombia) Emiliana Arango / (Colombia) Camila Osorio~~
- (Colombia) María Herazo González / (Colombia) Yuliana Lizarazo

=== Withdrawals ===
- (Colombia) Emiliana Arango (right ankle injury)
- (Slovenia) Dalila Jakupović (left eye injury)
