= 2018 Copa Colsanitas – Singles =

Singles
- 2018 Copa Colsanitas

Final
- Champion: (Slovakia) Anna Karolína Schmiedlová
- Runner-up: (Spain) Lara Arruabarrena
- Score: 6–2, 6–4

Events
Singles	Doubles
- Copa Colsanitas

Francesca Schiavone was the defending champion, but withdrew before the tournament began.

Anna Karolína Schmiedlová won the title, defeating Lara Arruabarrena in the final, 6–2, 6–4.

== Seeds ==
1. (Germany) Tatjana Maria (second round)
2. (Poland) Magda Linette (quarterfinals)
3. (Sweden) Johanna Larsson (quarterfinals)
4. (Paraguay) Verónica Cepede Royg (first round)
5. (Spain) Lara Arruabarrena (final)
6. (United States) Alison Riske (first round)
7. (Romania) Ana Bogdan (semifinals)
8. (Australia) Ajla Tomljanović (first round)

== Draw ==
Key

- Q = Qualifier
- WC = Wild card
- LL = Lucky loser
- Alt = Alternate
- ITF = ITF entry
- PR = Protected ranking
- SR = Special ranking
- SE = Special exempt
- JE = Junior exempt
- JR = Junior Accelerator Programme entrant
- CO = College Accelerator Programme entrant
- NG = Next Gen Accelerator Program entrant
- w/o = Walkover
- r = Retired
- d = Defaulted

=== Finals ===
Semifinals
7	(Romania) Ana Bogdan	3	2
(Slovakia) Anna Karolína Schmiedlová	6	6
5	(Spain) Lara Arruabarrena	6	6
(Slovenia) Dalila Jakupović	1	2

Final
(Slovakia) Anna Karolína Schmiedlová	6	6
5	(Spain) Lara Arruabarrena	2	4

=== Top half ===
First round
1	(Germany) T Maria	6	6
(Spain) G García Pérez	3	2
Q	(Chile) D Seguel	6	6
(United States) N Gibbs	2	2
(Russia) A Blinkova	6	6
WC	(Colombia) C Osorio	2	4
(Colombia) M Duque Mariño	1	6^{2}
7	(Romania) A Bogdan	6	7^{7}
4	(Paraguay) V Cepede Royg	0	6	4
WC	(Colombia) E Arango	6	2	6
Q	(Australia) L Cabrera	0	2
(Italy) J Paolini	6	6
(United States) I Falconi	5	6	1
(Slovakia) AK Schmiedlová	7	0	6
Q	(Mexico) R Zarazúa	1	6	7^{8}
8	(Australia) A Tomljanović	6	4	6^{6}

Second round
1	(Germany) T Maria	3	1
Q	(Chile) D Seguel	6	6
(Russia) A Blinkova	6	6^{8}	4
7	(Romania) A Bogdan	1	7^{10}	6
WC	(Colombia) E Arango	7^{7}	6
(Italy) J Paolini	6^{0}	1
(Slovakia) AK Schmiedlová	6	6
Q	(Mexico) R Zarazúa	1	4

Quarterfinals
Q	(Chile) D Seguel	1	1
7	(Romania) A Bogdan	6	6
WC	(Colombia) E Arango	1	0^{r}
(Slovakia) AK Schmiedlová	6	1

Semifinals
7	(Romania) A Bogdan	3	2
(Slovakia) AK Schmiedlová	6	6

=== Bottom half ===
First round
5	(Spain) L Arruabarrena	6	7^{7}
Q	(Mexico) V Rodríguez	2	6^{3}
(Spain) S Sorribes Tormo	3	6	6
(Canada) C Zhao	6	1	1
Q	(Greece) V Grammatikopoulou	5	6	6
(Japan) M Kato	7	4	4
(Belgium) Y Bonaventure	6^{4}	1
3	(Sweden) J Larsson	7^{7}	6
6	(United States) A Riske	2	2
(Slovenia) D Jakupović	6	6
(Japan) N Hibino	2	4
Q	(Bulgaria) E Kostova	6	6
(Czech Republic) T Martincová	4	6	3
WC	(Colombia) M Herazo González	6	1	6
(Russia) E Rodina	3	5
2	(Poland) M Linette	6	7

Second round
5	(Spain) L Arruabarrena	6	6
(Spain) S Sorribes Tormo	0	1
Q	(Greece) V Grammatikopoulou	6	4	4
3	(Sweden) J Larsson	4	6	6
(Slovenia) D Jakupović	6	6
Q	(Bulgaria) E Kostova	2	2
WC	(Colombia) M Herazo González	2	1
2	(Poland) M Linette	6	6

Quarterfinals
5	(Spain) L Arruabarrena	6	6
3	(Sweden) J Larsson	1	3
(Slovenia) D Jakupović	6	3	6
2	(Poland) M Linette	3	6	1

Semifinals
5	(Spain) L Arruabarrena	6	6
(Slovenia) D Jakupović	1	2

== Qualifying ==
=== Seeds ===
1. (Slovenia) Dalila Jakupović (moved to main draw)
2. (Australia) Lizette Cabrera (qualified)
3. (Belgium) Maryna Zanevska (qualifying competition)
4. (Switzerland) Conny Perrin (qualifying competition)
5. (Greece) Valentini Grammatikopoulou (qualified)
6. (Australia) Priscilla Hon (qualifying competition)
7. (Chile) Daniela Seguel (qualified)
8. (Japan) Miharu Imanishi (first round)
9. (Bulgaria) Elitsa Kostova (qualified)
10. (Russia) Irina Khromacheva (qualifying competition)
11. (Austria) Julia Grabher (first round)
12. (Mexico) Renata Zarazúa (qualified)

=== Qualifiers ===
1. (Bulgaria) Elitsa Kostova
2. (Australia) Lizette Cabrera
3. (Chile) Daniela Seguel
4. (Mexico) Victoria Rodríguez
5. (Greece) Valentini Grammatikopoulou
6. (Mexico) Renata Zarazúa

=== Draw ===
==== First qualifier ====
First round
Alt	(United States) Kaitlyn Christian	4	1
(Argentina) Nadia Podoroska	6	6
(United States) Jacqueline Cako	6^{4}	1
9	(Bulgaria) Elitsa Kostova	7^{7}	6

Qualifying competition
(Argentina) Nadia Podoroska	4	4
9	(Bulgaria) Elitsa Kostova	6	6

==== Second qualifier ====
First round
2	(Australia) Lizette Cabrera	6	6
(United States) Sabrina Santamaria	0	4
(Russia) Yana Sizikova	7^{7}	7^{7}
11	(Austria) Julia Grabher	6^{4}	6^{3}

Qualifying competition
2	(Australia) Lizette Cabrera	6	6
(Russia) Yana Sizikova	4	4

==== Third qualifier ====
First round
3	(Belgium) Maryna Zanevska	6	7^{7}
(Sweden) Cornelia Lister	4	6^{1}
WC	(Colombia) Jessica Plazas	3	3
7	(Chile) Daniela Seguel	6	6

Qualifying competition
3	(Belgium) Maryna Zanevska	3	3
7	(Chile) Daniela Seguel	6	6

==== Fourth qualifier ====
First round
4	(Switzerland) Conny Perrin	6	6
WC	(Colombia) Laura Rico García	1	0
(Mexico) Victoria Rodríguez	6	6
8	(Japan) Miharu Imanishi	0	2

Qualifying competition
4	(Switzerland) Conny Perrin	3	3
(Mexico) Victoria Rodríguez	6	6

==== Fifth qualifier ====
First round
5	(Greece) Valentini Grammatikopoulou	4	6	6
(Croatia) Tereza Mrdeža	6	4	3
WC	(Switzerland) Lulu Sun	3	3
10	(Russia) Irina Khromacheva	6	6

Qualifying competition
5	(Greece) Valentini Grammatikopoulou	7^{7}	7^{7}
10	(Russia) Irina Khromacheva	6^{4}	6^{5}

==== Sixth qualifier ====
First round
6	(Australia) Priscilla Hon	6	6
WC	(Colombia) Antonia Samudio	2	2
(Venezuela) Andrea Gámiz	4	2
12	(Mexico) Renata Zarazúa	6	6

Qualifying competition
6	(Australia) Priscilla Hon	6^{4}	0
12	(Mexico) Renata Zarazúa	7^{7}	6
