= 2016 Copa Colsanitas – Singles =

Singles
- 2016 Copa Colsanitas

Final
- Champion: (United States) Irina Falconi
- Runner-up: (Spain) Sílvia Soler Espinosa
- Score: 6–2, 2–6, 6–4

Events
Singles	Doubles
- Copa Colsanitas

Teliana Pereira was the defending champion, but lost in the first round to Catalina Pella.

Irina Falconi won her first WTA title, defeating Sílvia Soler Espinosa in the final, 6–2, 2–6, 6–4.

== Seeds ==
1. (Ukraine) Elina Svitolina (first round)
2. (Brazil) Teliana Pereira (first round)
3. (Colombia) Mariana Duque Mariño (first round)
4. (Spain) Lara Arruabarrena (semifinals)
5. (United States) Irina Falconi (champion)
6. (Germany) Tatjana Maria (second round)
7. (Spain) Lourdes Domínguez Lino (second round)
8. (United States) Anna Tatishvili (second round)

== Draw ==
Key

- Q = Qualifier
- WC = Wild card
- LL = Lucky loser
- Alt = Alternate
- ITF = ITF entry
- PR = Protected ranking
- SR = Special ranking
- SE = Special exempt
- JE = Junior exempt
- JR = Junior Accelerator Programme entrant
- CO = College Accelerator Programme entrant
- NG = Next Gen Accelerator Program entrant
- w/o = Walkover
- r = Retired
- d = Defaulted

=== Finals ===
Semifinals
(Brazil) Paula Cristina Gonçalves	4	7^{7}	2
(Spain) Sílvia Soler Espinosa	6	6^{4}	6
4	(Spain) Lara Arruabarrena	3	6	2
5	(United States) Irina Falconi	6	4	6

Final
(Spain) Sílvia Soler Espinosa	2	6	4
5	(United States) Irina Falconi	6	2	6

=== Top half ===
First round
1	(Ukraine) E Svitolina	5	6	6^{6}
(Russia) A Panova	7	1	7^{8}
Q	(Switzerland) C Perrin	6	7^{7}
(Switzerland) R Oprandi	4	6^{5}
(Brazil) PC Gonçalves	5	6	6
(Paraguay) V Cepede Royg	7	4	2
(Russia) M Melnikova	1	3
6	(Germany) T Maria	6	6
3	(Colombia) M Duque Mariño	6	6^{5}	4
(Switzerland) A Sadiković	3	7^{7}	6
Q	(Chile) D Seguel	3	6	3
(Sweden) R Peterson	6	4	6
(Spain) S Soler Espinosa	6	7
Q	(Czech Republic) T Martincová	2	5
(Turkey) İ Soylu	4	3
8	(United States) A Tatishvili	6	6

Second round
(Russia) A Panova	7^{9}	7^{9}
Q	(Switzerland) C Perrin	6^{7}	6^{7}
(Brazil) PC Gonçalves	6	6
6	(Germany) T Maria	4	3
(Switzerland) A Sadiković	6	6
(Sweden) R Peterson	4	4
(Spain) S Soler Espinosa	6^{5}	6	6
8	(United States) A Tatishvili	7^{7}	4	1

Quarterfinals
(Russia) A Panova	4	3
(Brazil) PC Gonçalves	6	6
(Switzerland) A Sadiković	4	4
(Spain) S Soler Espinosa	6	6

Semifinals
(Brazil) PC Gonçalves	4	7^{7}	2
(Spain) S Soler Espinosa	6	6^{4}	6

=== Bottom half ===
First round
7	(Spain) L Domínguez Lino	5	6	6
(Romania) PM Țig	7	4	4
WC	(Colombia) Y Lizarazo	6^{3}	1
(United States) S Vickery	7^{7}	6
Q	(France) C Paquet	3	6	2
(Germany) A Schäfer	6	2	6
WC	(Venezuela) N Echeverría Alam	0	2
4	(Spain) L Arruabarrena	6	6
5	(United States) I Falconi	6	6
WC	(Colombia) E Arango	0	1
Q	(United States) S Marand	3	6^{2}
(France) S Reix	6	7^{7}
(Spain) L Pous Tió	4	3
(Bulgaria) E Kostova	6	6
Q	(Argentina) C Pella	3	6	7^{7}
2	(Brazil) T Pereira	6	3	6^{3}

Second round
7	(Spain) L Domínguez Lino	0	6	3
(United States) S Vickery	6	2	6
(Germany) A Schäfer	1	0
4	(Spain) L Arruabarrena	6	6
5	(United States) I Falconi	6	7^{7}
(France) S Reix	3	6^{2}
(Bulgaria) E Kostova	3	2
Q	(Argentina) C Pella	6	6

Quarterfinals
(United States) S Vickery	2	0
4	(Spain) L Arruabarrena	6	6
5	(United States) I Falconi	6	6
Q	(Argentina) C Pella	1	4

Semifinals
4	(Spain) L Arruabarrena	3	6	2
5	(United States) I Falconi	6	4	6

== Qualifying ==
=== Seeds ===
1. (Czech Republic) Tereza Martincová (qualified)
2. (United States) Maria Sanchez (qualifying competition)
3. (Mexico) Victoria Rodríguez (qualifying competition)
4. (Switzerland) Conny Perrin (qualified)
5. (Venezuela) Andrea Gámiz (first round)
6. (Argentina) Catalina Pella (qualified)
7. (France) Chloé Paquet (qualified)
8. (Brazil) Gabriela Cé (qualifying competition)
9. (Chile) Daniela Seguel (qualified)
10. (Spain) Georgina García Pérez (qualifying competition)
11. (Bulgaria) Aleksandrina Naydenova (qualifying competition)
12. (Mexico) Ana Sofía Sánchez (first round)

=== Qualifiers ===
1. (Czech Republic) Tereza Martincová
2. (Chile) Daniela Seguel
3. (France) Chloé Paquet
4. (Switzerland) Conny Perrin
5. (United States) Sanaz Marand
6. (Argentina) Catalina Pella

=== Draw ===
==== First qualifier ====
First round				Qualifying competition
				1	(Czech Republic) Tereza Martincová	6^{5}	6	6
	(United States) Alexandra Morozova	2	5	10	(Spain) Georgina García Pérez	7^{7}	4	4
10	(Spain) Georgina García Pérez	6	7

==== Second qualifier ====
First round				Qualifying competition
				2	(United States) Maria Sanchez	6^{5}	1
	(Switzerland) Jil Belen Teichmann	1	1	9	(Chile) Daniela Seguel	7^{7}	6
9	(Chile) Daniela Seguel	6	6

==== Third qualifier ====
First round				Qualifying competition
				3	(Mexico) Victoria Rodríguez	1	4
WC	(Colombia) Sofía Múnera Sánchez	3	2	7	(France) Chloé Paquet	6	6
7	(France) Chloé Paquet	6	6

==== Fourth qualifier ====
First round
4	(Switzerland) Conny Perrin	6	6^{2}	6
WC	(Colombia) Camila Osorio	1	7^{7}	2
(Mexico) Renata Zarazúa	6	6
12	(Mexico) Ana Sofía Sánchez	2	1

Qualifying competition
4	(Switzerland) Conny Perrin	6	6
(Mexico) Renata Zarazúa	4	2

==== Fifth qualifier ====
First round
5	(Venezuela) Andrea Gámiz	6	4	5
(United States) Sanaz Marand	3	6	7
(United States) Nicole Melichar	0	1
8	(Brazil) Gabriela Cé	6	6

Qualifying competition
(United States) Sanaz Marand	6	6
8	(Brazil) Gabriela Cé	4	2

==== Sixth qualifier ====
First round
6	(Argentina) Catalina Pella	6	6
(United Kingdom) Tara Moore	4	0
WC	(Colombia) Laura Rico García	1	4
11	(Bulgaria) Aleksandrina Naydenova	6	6

Qualifying competition
6	(Argentina) Catalina Pella	5	6	6
11	(Bulgaria) Aleksandrina Naydenova	7	4	4
