= 2018 Copa Colsanitas =

- Date: 9–15 April
- Edition: 21st
- Category: WTA International
- Draw: 32S / 16D
- Prize money: $250,000
- Surface: Clay / outdoor
- Location: Bogotá, Colombia

Champions

Singles
- (Slovakia) Anna Karolína Schmiedlová

Doubles
- (Slovenia) Dalila Jakupović / (Russia) Irina Khromacheva
← 2017 ·	Copa Colsanitas	· 2019 →

The 2018 Copa Colsanitas (also known as the 2018 Claro Open Colsanitas for sponsorship reasons) was a women's tennis tournament played on outdoor clay courts. It was the 21st edition of the Copa Colsanitas, and part of the International category of the 2018 WTA Tour. It took place at the Centro de Alto Rendimiento in Bogotá, Colombia, from April 9 through April 15, 2018.

== Finals ==
=== Singles ===
- (Slovakia) Anna Karolína Schmiedlová defeated (Spain) Lara Arruabarrena, 6–2, 6–4

=== Doubles ===
- (Slovenia) Dalila Jakupović / (Russia) Irina Khromacheva defeated (Colombia) Mariana Duque Mariño / (Argentina) Nadia Podoroska, 6–3, 6–4

== Points and prize money ==
=== Point distribution ===
Event	W	F	SF	QF	Round of 16	Round of 32	Q	Q2	Q1
Singles	280	180	110	60	30	1	18	12	1
Doubles	280	180	110	60	1	—	—	—	—

=== Prize money ===
Event	W	F	SF	QF	Round of 16	Round of 32	Q2	Q1
Singles	$43,000	$21,400	$11,500	$6,175	$3,400	$2,100	$1,020	$600
Doubles*	$12,300	$6,400	$3,435	$1,820	$960	—	—	—

_{*per team}

== Singles main-draw entrants ==
=== Seeds ===
Country	Player	Ranking^{1}	Seed
GER	Tatjana Maria	61	1
POL	Magda Linette	69	2
SWE	Johanna Larsson	73	3
PAR	Verónica Cepede Royg	81	4
ESP	Lara Arruabarrena	84	5
USA	Alison Riske	89	6
ROU	Ana Bogdan	90	7
AUS	Ajla Tomljanović	96	8

- ^{1} Rankings as of 2 April 2018.

=== Other entrants ===
The following players received wildcards into the main draw:

- (Colombia) Emiliana Arango
- (Colombia) María Herazo González
- (Colombia) Camila Osorio

The following players received entry from the qualifying draw:

- (Australia) Lizette Cabrera
- (Greece) Valentini Grammatikopoulou
- (Bulgaria) Elitsa Kostova
- (Mexico) Victoria Rodríguez
- (Chile) Daniela Seguel
- (Mexico) Renata Zarazúa

=== Withdrawals ===
Before the tournament

- (Canada) Eugenie Bouchard → replaced by (Spain) Georgina García Pérez
- (Italy) Sara Errani → replaced by (Canada) Carol Zhao
- (Brazil) Beatriz Haddad Maia → replaced by (Russia) Anna Blinkova
- (Russia) Daria Kasatkina → replaced by (Czech Republic) Tereza Martincová
- (Italy) Francesca Schiavone → replaced by (Belgium) Ysaline Bonaventure
- (United States) Sachia Vickery → replaced by (United States) Irina Falconi

=== Retirements ===
- (Colombia) Emiliana Arango

== Doubles main-draw entrants ==
=== Seeds ===
Country	Player	Country	Player	Rank^{1}	Seed
JPN	Nao Hibino	JPN	Miyu Kato	100	1
SLO	Dalila Jakupović	RUS	Irina Khromacheva	129	2
ESP	Lara Arruabarrena	USA	Alison Riske	175	3
USA	Kaitlyn Christian	USA	Sabrina Santamaria	176	4

- Rankings as of 2 April 2018.

=== Other entrants ===
The following pairs received wildcards into the doubles main draw:

- (Colombia) María Herazo González / (Colombia) Yuliana Lizarazo
- (Colombia) Camila Osorio / (Colombia) Jessica Plazas
