= Stephanie Nemtsova =

American tennis player

- Country (sports): United States
- Born: 15 April 1998 (age 26)
- Plays: Right-handed (two-handed backhand)
- Prize money: $3,630

Singles
- Career record: 52–53
- Career titles: 0
- Highest ranking: No. 946 (9 April 2018)

Doubles
- Career record: 32–31
- Career titles: 2 ITF
- Highest ranking: No. 622 (20 August 2017)

Stephanie Nemtsova (born 15 April 1998) is an American former professional tennis player.

Nemtsova has a career-high singles ranking of world No. 946, achieved on 9 April 2018, and a career-high WTA doubles ranking of 622, reached on 28 August 2017.

She made her WTA Tour main-draw debut at the 2017 Copa Colsanitas, in the doubles draw partnering Alyssa Mayo.

== ITF finals ==
=== Doubles: 4 (2–2) ===
Legend
$100,000 tournaments
$80,000 tournaments
$60,000 tournaments
$25,000 tournaments
$15,000 tournaments

Result	No.	Date	Tournament	Surface	Partner	Opponents	Score
Loss	1.	9 December 2016	ITF La Paz, Bolivia	Clay	(Brazil) Thaisa Grana Pedretti	(Argentina) Victoria Bosio (Mexico) Victoria Rodríguez	6–7^{(2)}, 4–6
Win	1.	2 June 2017	ITF Villa del Dique, Argentina	Clay	(Paraguay) Lara Escauriza	(United States) Quinn Gleason (United States) Mara Schmidt	6–2, 6–3
Loss	2.	10 December 2017	ITF Guayaquil, Ecuador	Hard	(Peru) Dominique Schaefer	(Mexico) María José Portillo Ramírez (United States) Sofia Sewing	5–7, 2–6
Win	2.	10 August 2018	ITF Santa Tecla, El Salvador	Hard	(Mexico) Andrea Renée Villarreal	(Montenegro) Vladica Babić (United States) Monica Robinson	6–1, 7–6^{(4)}
