= Elixane Lechemia =

French tennis player (born 1991)

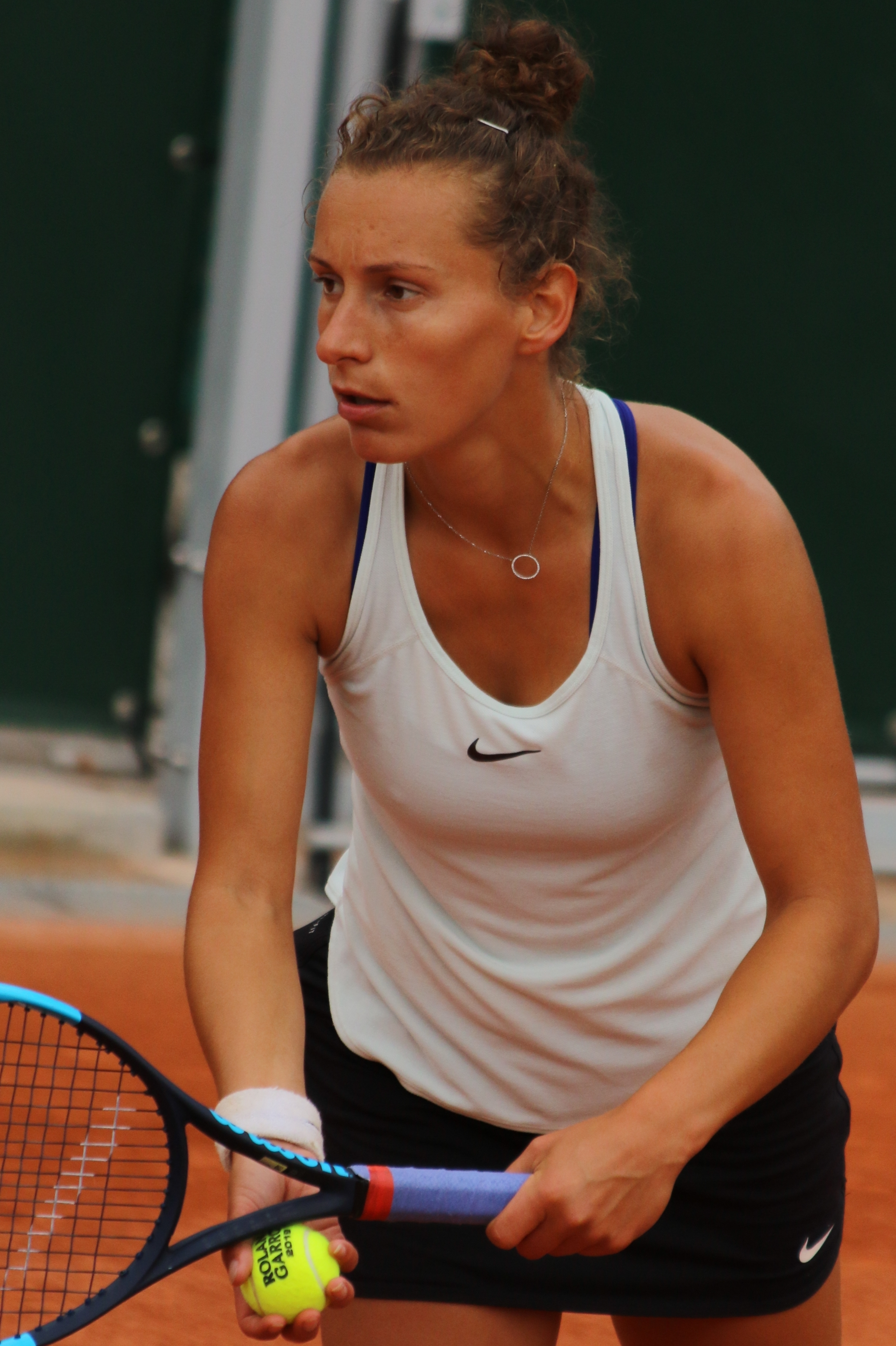
- Lechemia at the 2019 French Open
- Country (sports): France
- Residence: Lyon, France
- Born: 3 September 1991 (age 35) Villeurbanne, France
- Height: 1.76 m (5 ft 9 in)
- Plays: Left (two-handed backhand)
- Prize money: $417,413

Singles
- Career record: 234–207
- Career titles: 0 WTA, 4 ITF
- Highest ranking: No. 343 (3 April 2017)

Doubles
- Career record: 258–273
- Career titles: 1 WTA, 2 WTA Challengers
- Highest ranking: No. 65 (7 March 2022)
- Current ranking: No. 186 (31 August 2026)

Grand Slam doubles results
- Australian Open: 3R (2024)
- French Open: 1R (2019, 2020, 2021, 2022, 2023, 2024, 2025)
- Wimbledon: 2R (2021, 2024)
- US Open: 2R (2021)

Grand Slam mixed doubles results
- French Open: 2R (2023)
- Last updated on: 7 September 2026.

Elixane Lechemia (born 3 September 1991) is a French tennis player.

She has career-high WTA rankings of No. 343 in singles, achieved on 3 April 2017, and of No. 65 in doubles, set on 7 March 2022. Lechemia has won one doubles title on the WTA Tour and two on WTA 125 tournaments, with four singles and 16 doubles titles on the ITF Circuit.

== Career ==
=== 2019–2020: Major debut ===
Lechemia made her major main-draw debut at the 2019 French Open, after receiving a wildcard for the doubles draw, partnering Estelle Cascino. She participated also in the 2020 French Open as a wildcard, partnering with debutante French teenager Elsa Jacquemot.

=== 2021–2022: First WTA Tour doubles title ===
Lechemia won her first WTA Tour title at the 2021 Copa Colsanitas in Bogotá, partnering with Ingrid Neel, defeating the third-seeded pair of Mihaela Buzărnescu and Anna-Lena Friedsam.

Partnering Quinn Gleason, Lechemia was runner-up in the doubles at the WTA 125 2022 Montevideo Open, losing to Ingrid Martins and Luisa Stefani in the final.

=== 2023–2024: Second career final and major third round in doubles ===
Lechemia received a wildcard for the French Open for the main draw in doubles partnering Jessika Ponchet. Partnering Quinn Gleason, Lechemia finished runner-up at the 2023 Prague Open, losing to Nao Hibino and Oksana Kalashnikova in the final. Playing with Katarzyna Kawa, she was doubles champion at the WTA 125 2023 Polish Open, thanks to a win over Naiktha Bains and Maia Lumsden in the final.

After the withdrawal of top seeds Coco Gauff and Jessica Pegula, she entered the 2024 Australian Open as an alternate pair, partnering Tamara Korpatsch, and reached the third round of a major for the first time in her career, but lost to Caroline Garcia and Kristina Mladenovic.

== Grand Slam doubles performance timeline ==
Key
W	F	SF	QF	#R	RR	Q#	DNQ	A	NH

(W) winner; (F) finalist; (SF) semifinalist; (QF) quarterfinalist; (#R) rounds 4, 3, 2, 1; (RR) round-robin stage; (Q#) qualification round; (DNQ) did not qualify; (A) absent; (NH) not held; (SR) strike rate (events won / competed); (W–L) win–loss record.
To avoid confusion and double counting, these charts are updated at the conclusion of a tournament or when the player's participation has ended.

Tournament	2019	2020	2021	2022	2023	2024	2025	W–L
Australian Open	A	A	A	1R	A	3R	A	2–2
French Open	1R	1R	1R	1R	1R	1R	1R	0–7
Wimbledon	A	NH	2R	1R	A	2R	A	2–3
US Open	A	A	2R	A	A	A	A	1–1
Win–loss	0–1	0–1	2–3	0–3	0–1	3–3	0–1	5–13

== WTA Tour finals ==
=== Doubles: 2 (1 title, 1 runner-up) ===
Legend WTA 500 WTA 250 (1–1)	Finals by surface Hard (0–1) Clay (1–0)

Result	W–L	Date	Tournament	Tier	Surface	Partner	Opponents	Score
Win	1–0	Apr 2021	Copa Colsanitas, Colombia	WTA 250	Clay	(United States) Ingrid Neel	(Romania) Mihaela Buzărnescu (Germany) Anna-Lena Friedsam	6–3, 6–4
Loss	1–1	Jul 2023	Prague Open, Czech Republic	WTA 250	Hard	(United States) Quinn Gleason	(Japan) Nao Hibino (Georgia (country)) Oksana Kalashnikova	7–6^{(9–7)}, 5–7, [3–10]

== WTA 125 finals ==
=== Doubles: 8 (2 titles, 6 runner-ups) ===
Result	W–L	Date	Tournament	Surface	Partner	Opponents	Score
Loss	0–1	Nov 2022	Montevideo Open, Uruguay	Clay	(United States) Quinn Gleason	(Brazil) Ingrid Martins (Brazil) Luisa Stefani	5–7, 7–6^{(8–6)}, [6–10]
Win	1–1	Aug 2023	Kozerki Open, Poland	Hard	(Poland) Katarzyna Kawa	(United Kingdom) Naiktha Bains (United Kingdom) Maia Lumsden	6–3, 6–4
Loss	1–2	Sep 2023	Bari Open, Italy	Clay	(Greece) Valentini Grammatikopoulou	(Poland) Katarzyna Kawa (Czech Republic) Anna Sisková	1–6, 2–6
Loss	1–3	May 2024	Parma Open, Italy	Clay	(Brazil) Ingrid Martins	(Kazakhstan) Anna Danilina (Russia) Irina Khromacheva	1–6, 2–6
Loss	1–4	Mar 2025	Antalya Challenger, Turkiye	Clay	(United Kingdom) Alicia Barnett	(Hungary) Anna Bondár (Switzerland) Simona Waltert	5–7, 6–2, [6–10]
Loss	1–5	Jun 2025	Birmingham Open, United Kingdom	Grass	(United Kingdom) Alicia Barnett	(Australia) Destanee Aiava (Spain) Cristina Bucșa	4–6, 2–6
Loss	1–6	Jul 2026	Bastad Open, Sweden	Clay	(United Kingdom) Alicia Barnett	(Colombia) Emiliana Arango (Switzerland) Simona Waltert	4–6, 1–6
Win	2–6	Jul 2026	Kitzbühel Ladies Open, Austria	Clay	(United Kingdom) Alicia Barnett	(Spain) Yvonne Cavallé Reimers (Brazil) Laura Pigossi	6–4, 6–3

== ITF Circuit finals ==
=== Singles: 9 (4 titles, 5 runner-ups) ===
Legend $25,000 tournaments $10/15,000 tournaments (4–5)	Finals by surface Hard (3–1) Clay (1–4)

Result	W–L	Date	Tournament	Tier	Surface	Opponent	Score
Loss	0–1	Sep 2009	ITF Espinho, Portugal	10,000	Clay	(Morocco) Fatima El Allami	3–6, 2–6
Win	1–1	Sep 2010	ITF Lleida, Spain	10,000	Clay	(Morocco) Nadia Lalami	7–6^{(3)}, 6–1
Loss	1–2	May 2011	ITF Getxo, Spain	10,000	Clay	(Ukraine) Yevgeniya Kryvoruchko	6–7^{(9)}, 6–3, 6–7^{(5)}
Loss	1–3	Jun 2011	ITF Florence, Italy	10,000	Clay	(Italy) Anastasia Grymalska	0–6, 6–4, 1–6
Loss	1–4	May 2012	ITF Edinburgh, UK	10,000	Clay	(Netherlands) Quirine Lemoine	1–6, 0–6
Win	2–4	May 2016	ITF Antalya, Turkey	10,000	Hard	(Colombia) Yuliana Lizarazo	6–3, 3–6, 6–4
Win	3–4	Sep 2016	ITF Pétange, Luxembourg	10,000	Hard (i)	(Belgium) Magali Kempen	6–3, 6–0
Win	4–4	Oct 2016	GB Pro-Series Loughborough, UK	10,000	Hard (i)	(Czech Republic) Petra Krejsová	7–5, 6–1
Loss	4–5	Mar 2017	ITF Sharm El Sheikh, Egypt	15,000	Hard	(Russia) Polina Monova	6–2, 5–7, 4–6

=== Doubles: 30 (16 titles, 14 runner-ups) ===
Legend $60,000 tournaments (2–2) $25,000 tournaments (8–4) $10/15,000 tournaments (6–8)	Finals by surface Hard (7–8) Clay (8–5) Carpet (1–1)

Result	W–L	Date	Tournament	Tier	Surface	Partner	Opponents	Score
Loss	0–1	May 2009	ITF Bournemouth, UK	10,000	Clay	(France) Alizé Lim	(United Kingdom) Stephanie Cornish (Hungary) Tímea Babos	w/o
Win	1–1	Sep 2009	ITF Espinho, Portugal	10,000	Clay	(France) Caroline Garcia	(Ukraine) Mishel Okhremchuk (France) Morgane Pons	7–5, 6–1
Win	2–1	Nov 2009	ITF Équeurdreville, France	10,000	Hard (i)	(France) Constance Sibille	(Bulgaria) Elitsa Kostova (France) Kinnie Laisné	6–4, 6–2
Win	3–1	Aug 2010	ITF Innsbruck, Austria	10,000	Clay	(France) Victoria Larrière	(Switzerland) Xenia Knoll (Switzerland) Amra Sadiković	w/o
Loss	3–2	Oct 2010	ITF Clermont-Ferrand, France	25,000	Hard	(France) Alizé Lim	(France) Youlia Fedossova (France) Iryna Brémond	6–7^{(5)}, 3–6
Loss	3–3	July 2011	ITF Denain, France	25,000	Hard	(France) Céline Ghesquière	(Paraguay) Verónica Cepede Royg (Brazil) Teliana Pereira	1–6, 1–6
Loss	3–4	Nov 2011	ITF Équeurdreville, France	10,000	Hard	(Croatia) Silvia Njirić	(Belgium) Elyne Boeykens (Netherlands) Eva Wacanno	4–6, 4–6
Loss	3–5	Jan 2012	ITF Sutton, UK	10,000	Hard (i)	(France) Irina Ramialison	(Republic of Ireland) Amy Bowtell (Netherlands) Quirine Lemoine	6–7^{(5)}, 3–6
Loss	3–6	May 2012	ITF Edinburgh, UK	10,000	Clay	(Czech Republic) Martina Přádová	(Netherlands) Eva Wacanno (Australia) Karolina Wlodarczak	6–4, 0–6, [11–13]
Win	4–6	Nov 2016	ITF Solarino, Italy	10,000	Carpet	(France) Mathilde Armitano	(Italy) Deborah Chiesa (Italy) Maria Masini	7–5, 6–1
Loss	4–7	Nov 2016	ITF Solarino, Italy	10,000	Carpet	(France) Mathilde Armitano	(Italy) Anna-Giulia Remondina (Italy) Dalila Spiteri	w/o
Loss	4–8	Jul 2017	ITF Denain, France	25,000	Hard	(France) Mathilde Armitano	(Japan) Momoko Kobori (Japan) Ayano Shimizu	4–6, 3–6
Loss	4–9	Nov 2017	ITF Benicarló, Spain	15,000	Clay	(Spain) Cristina Bucșa	(Spain) Noelia Bouzó Zanotti (Spain) Ángeles Moreno Barranquero	3–6, 4–6
Loss	4–10	Feb 2018	Open de l'Isère, France	25,000	Hard (i)	(France) Estelle Cascino	(Switzerland) Amra Sadiković (Netherlands) Eva Wacanno	6–4, 1–6, [6–10]
Win	5–10	Mar 2018	ITF Mâcon, France	15,000	Hard	(France) Mathilde Armitano	(France) Manon Arcangioli (Latvia) Diāna Marcinkēviča	6–1, 3–6, [10–8]
Loss	5–11	Mar 2018	ITF Tel Aviv, Israel	15,000	Hard (i)	(France) Mathilde Armitano	(United Kingdom) Alicia Barnett (United Kingdom) Olivia Nicholls	6–7^{(3)}, 3–6
Loss	5–12	Jun 2018	ITF Hammamet, Tunisia	15,000	Clay	(Spain) Claudia Hoste Ferrer	(Chile) Fernanda Brito (Argentina) Sofía Luini	3–6, 2–6
Win	6–12	Jun 2018	Open de Montpellier, France	25,000	Clay	(France) Alice Ramé	(Brazil) Carolina Alves (Italy) Martina Colmegna	6–7^{(5)}, 6–2, [10–6]
Win	7–12	Jun 2018	ITF Périgueux, France	25,000	Clay	(Greece) Eleni Kordolaimi	(Spain) Cristina Bucșa (Colombia) María Herazo González	6–4, 3–6, [11–9]
Win	8–12	Jul 2018	ITF Setúbal, Portugal	25,000	Hard	(France) Mathilde Armitano	(Slovakia) Tereza Mihalíková (Bulgaria) Julia Terziyska	6–7^{(5)}, 6–3, [13–11]
Win	9–12	Nov 2018	Open Nantes Atlantique, France	25,000	Hard (i)	(France) Estelle Cascino	(Uzbekistan) Akgul Amanmuradova (Russia) Alina Silich	7–5, 6–4
Win	10–12	Feb 2019	Open de l'Isère, France	25,000	Hard (i)	(France) Estelle Cascino	(Romania) Andreea Mitu (Romania) Elena-Gabriela Ruse	6–2, 6–2
Win	11–12	Mar 2019	ITF Gonesse, France	15,000	Clay	(France) Mathilde Armitano	(Germany) Tayisiya Morderger (Germany) Yana Morderger	7–6^{(1)}, 7–5
Win	12–12	Apr 2019	ITF Calvi, France	25,000	Hard	(France) Estelle Cascino	(Russia) Ekaterina Kazionova (Sweden) Linnéa Malmqvist	6–3, 6–2
Win	13–12	Apr 2019	ITF Pula, Italy	25,000	Clay	(France) Manon Arcangioli	(Russia) Victoria Kan (Russia) Anna Morgina	w/o
Win	14–12	Feb 2020	Open de l'Isère, France	25,000	Hard (i)	(France) Amandine Hesse	(United Kingdom) Samantha Murray Sharan (Germany) Julia Wachaczyk	6–3, 4–6, [13–11]
Win	15–12	Sep 2022	Prague Open, Czech Republic	60,000	Clay	(Germany) Julia Lohoff	(Czech Republic) Linda Klimovičová (Czech Republic) Dominika Šalková	7–5, 7–5
Loss	15–13	Jan 2023	Vero Beach Open, US	60,000	Clay	(United States) Quinn Gleason	(United States) Francesca Di Lorenzo (United States) Makenna Jones	6–4, 3–6, [3–10]
Loss	15–14	Feb 2023	Guanajuato Open, Mexico	60,000+H	Hard	(United States) Quinn Gleason	(United States) Emina Bektas (United States) Ingrid Neel	6–7^{(4)}, 6–3, [6–10]
Win	16–14	Apr 2025	Chiasso Open, Switzerland	W75	Clay	(United Kingdom) Alicia Barnett	(Algeria) Inès Ibbou (Netherlands) Bibiane Schoofs	6–2, 6–3
