= 2016 Copa Colsanitas =

- Date: 11–18 April
- Edition: 19th
- Category: WTA International
- Draw: 32S / 16D
- Prize money: $250,000
- Surface: Clay / outdoor
- Location: Bogotá, Colombia

Champions

Singles
- (United States) Irina Falconi

Doubles
- (Spain) Lara Arruabarrena / (Germany) Tatjana Maria
- Copa Colsanitas

The 2016 Copa Colsanitas (also known as the 2016 Claro Open Colsanitas) was a women's tennis tournament played on outdoor clay courts. It was the 19th edition of the Copa Colsanitas, and part of the International category of the 2016 WTA Tour. It took place at the Centro de Alto Rendimiento in Bogotá, Colombia, from 11 April through 18 April 2016. Fifth-seeded Irina Falconi won the singles title.

== Finals ==
=== Singles ===
- (United States) Irina Falconi defeated (Spain) Sílvia Soler Espinosa, 6–2, 2–6, 6–4

=== Doubles ===
- (Spain) Lara Arruabarrena / (Germany) Tatjana Maria defeated (Brazil) Gabriela Cé / (Venezuela) Andrea Gámiz, 6–2, 4–6, [10–8]

== Points and prize money ==
=== Point distribution ===
Event	W	F	SF	QF	Round of 16	Round of 32	Q	Q3	Q2	Q1
Singles	280	180	110	60	30	1	18	14	10	1
Doubles	280	180	110	60	1	—N/a	—N/a	—N/a	—N/a	—N/a

=== Prize money ===
Event	W	F	SF	QF	Round of 16	Round of 32	Q3	Q2	Q1
Singles	$43,000	$21,400	$11,300	$5,900	$3,310	$1,925	$1,005	$730	$530
Doubles	$12,300	$6,400	$3,435	$1,820	$960	—N/a	—N/a	—N/a	—N/a

== Singles main-draw entrants ==
=== Seeds ===
Country	Player	Rank^{1}	Seed
UKR	Elina Svitolina	16	1
BRA	Teliana Pereira	49	2
COL	Mariana Duque Mariño	77	3
ESP	Lara Arruabarrena	80	4
USA	Irina Falconi	91	5
GER	Tatjana Maria	105	6
ESP	Lourdes Domínguez Lino	112	7
USA	Anna Tatishvili	116	8

- ^{1} Rankings as of 4 April 2016.

=== Other entrants ===
The following players received wildcards into the singles main draw:

- (Colombia) Emiliana Arango
- (Venezuela) Nadia Echeverría Alam
- (Colombia) Yuliana Lizarazo

The following players received entry from the qualifying draw:

- (United States) Sanaz Marand
- (Czech Republic) Tereza Martincová
- (France) Chloé Paquet
- (Argentina) Catalina Pella
- (Switzerland) Conny Perrin
- (Chile) Daniela Seguel

=== Withdrawals ===
Before the tournament

- (Slovakia) Jana Čepelová → replaced by (Switzerland) Amra Sadiković
- (United States) Lauren Davis → replaced by (Spain) Sílvia Soler Espinosa
- (United States) Alexa Glatch → replaced by (Russia) Marina Melnikova
- (Slovakia) Kristína Kučová → replaced by (Brazil) Paula Cristina Gonçalves
- (United States) Varvara Lepchenko → replaced by (Russia) Alexandra Panova
- (France) Alizé Lim → replaced by (Bulgaria) Elitsa Kostova
- (Croatia) Petra Martić → replaced by (Spain) Laura Pous Tió
- (United States) Christina McHale → replaced by (Turkey) İpek Soylu

== Doubles main-draw entrants ==
=== Seeds ===
Country	Player	Country	Player	Rank^{1}	Seed
ESP	Lara Arruabarrena	GER	Tatjana Maria	109	1
USA	Irina Falconi	RUS	Alexandra Panova	191	2
PAR	Verónica Cepede Royg	RUS	Marina Melnikova	203	3
BRA	Paula Cristina Gonçalves	USA	Sanaz Marand	221	4

- Rankings are as of April 4, 2016.

=== Other entrants ===
The following pair received a wildcard into the doubles main draw:

- (Venezuela) Nadia Echeverría Alam / (Colombia) Yuliana Lizarazo
