= 2019 Copa Colsanitas – Doubles =

Tennis tournament

Doubles
- 2019 Copa Colsanitas

Final
- Champions: (Australia) Zoe Hives (Australia) Astra Sharma
- Runners-up: (United States) Hayley Carter (United States) Ena Shibahara
- Score: 6–1, 6–2

Details
- Draw: 14
- Seeds: 4

Events
Singles	Doubles
- Copa Colsanitas

Dalila Jakupović and Irina Khromacheva were the defending champions, but withdrew due to a left eye injury sustained by Jakupović.

Zoe Hives and Astra Sharma won the title, defeating Hayley Carter and Ena Shibahara in the final, 6–1, 6–2.

== Seeds ==
1. (Slovenia) Dalila Jakupović / (Russia) Irina Khromacheva (withdrew)
2. (Spain) Lara Arruabarrena / (Spain) Sara Sorribes Tormo (semifinals)
3. (Chile) Alexa Guarachi / (United States) Desirae Krawczyk (first round)
4. (Australia) Monique Adamczak / (Australia) Jessica Moore (semifinals)

== Draw ==
Key

- Q = Qualifier
- WC = Wild card
- LL = Lucky loser
- Alt = Alternate
- ITF = ITF entry
- PR = Protected ranking
- SR = Special ranking
- SE = Special exempt
- JE = Junior exempt
- JR = Junior Accelerator Programme entrant
- CO = College Accelerator Programme entrant
- NG = Next Gen Accelerator Program entrant
- w/o = Walkover
- r = Retired
- d = Defaulted

=== Draw ===
First round
4	(Australia) M Adamczak (Australia) J Moore	6	6
(Canada) S Fichman (New Zealand) E Routliffe	3	0
(Kazakhstan) A Danilina (Russia) Y Sizikova	3	3
(Romania) A Bogdan (United States) S Vickery	6	6
(Brazil) L Pigossi (Mexico) R Zarazúa	4	4
(Romania) I Bara (Romania) E-G Ruse	6	6
(United States) H Carter (United States) E Shibahara	6	3	[10]
3	(Chile) A Guarachi (United States) D Krawczyk	3	6	[8]
(Belgium) Y Bonaventure (United States) J Cako	3	3
WC	(Colombia) M Herazo González (Colombia) Y Lizarazo	6	6
(Poland) M Linette (United States) C McHale	3	1
2	(Spain) L Arruabarrena (Spain) S Sorribes Tormo	6	6

Quarterfinals
(Switzerland) C Perrin (Netherlands) B Schoofs	6^{6}	0
(Australia) Z Hives (Australia) A Sharma	7^{8}	6
4	(Australia) M Adamczak (Australia) J Moore	6	7
(Romania) A Bogdan (United States) S Vickery	1	5
(Romania) I Bara (Romania) E-G Ruse	2	5
(United States) H Carter (United States) E Shibahara	6	7
WC	(Colombia) M Herazo González (Colombia) Y Lizarazo	2	0
2	(Spain) L Arruabarrena (Spain) S Sorribes Tormo	6	6

Semifinals
(Australia) Z Hives (Australia) A Sharma	5	6	[10]
4	(Australia) M Adamczak (Australia) J Moore	7	3	[4]
(United States) H Carter (United States) E Shibahara	6	6
2	(Spain) L Arruabarrena (Spain) S Sorribes Tormo	3	3

Final
(Australia) Z Hives (Australia) A Sharma	6	6
(United States) H Carter (United States) E Shibahara	1	2
