= Nadia Echeverría Alam =

American-Venezuelan tennis player

Nadia Echeverría Saud
- Full name: Nadia Echeverría Alam Saud
- Country (sports): United States (2010–2015); Venezuela (2016–2022)
- Born: 14 January 1996 (age 30) Puerto Ordaz, Venezuela
- Turned pro: 2010
- Plays: Right (two-handed backhand)
- Prize money: $43,571

Singles
- Career record: 96–130
- Career titles: 0
- Highest ranking: No. 758 (22 April 2013)

Doubles
- Career record: 105–106
- Career titles: 6 ITF
- Highest ranking: No. 479 (2 May 2016)

Nadia Echeverría Alam (born 14 January 1996) is an American-Venezuelan former professional tennis player.

In her career, Echeverría Alam won six doubles titles on the ITF Women's Circuit. On 2 May 2016, she peaked at No. 479 in the WTA doubles rankings.

She made her WTA Tour main-draw debut at the 2016 Copa Colsanitas in the doubles event, partnering with Yuliana Lizarazo.

Echeverría Alam also works as a high-performance tennis coach leading some of the top players in the South Florida area.

Nadia is currently playing in the professional Pickleball circuit (both PPA and APP) as of January 2025

== ITF Circuit finals ==
=== Singles: 2 (2 runner-ups) ===
| Legend $10/15,000 tournaments | Finals by surface Clay (0–2) |

| Result | W–L | Date | Tournament | Tier | Surface | Opponent | Score |
|---|---|---|---|---|---|---|---|
| Loss | 0–1 | Nov 2011 | ITF Medellin, Colombia | 10,000 | Clay | (Slovakia) Lenka Broosova | 3–6, 2–6 |
| Loss | 0–2 | Jul 2019 | ITF Lima, Peru | 15,000 | Clay | (Bolivia) Noelia Zeballos | 3–6, 1–6 |

=== Doubles: 17 (6 titles, 11 runner-ups) ===
| Legend $25/35,000 tournaments $10/15,000 tournaments | Finals by surface Hard (3–8) Clay (3–3) |

| Result | W–L | Date | Tournament | Tier | Surface | Partner | Opponents | Score |
|---|---|---|---|---|---|---|---|---|
| Loss | 0–1 | Aug 2010 | ITF San Luis Potosí, Mexico | 10,000 | Hard | (Argentina) Andrea Benítez | (United States) Macall Harkins (Austria) Nicole Rottmann | 1–6, 4–6 |
| Loss | 0–2 | Jul 2011 | ITF Evansville, United States | 10,000 | Hard | (United States) Elizabeth Ferris | (United States) Brynn Boren (United States) Sabrina Santamaria | 4–6, 6–4, [9–11] |
| Win | 1–2 | May 2012 | ITF Trujillo, Peru | 10,000 | Clay | (United States) Elizabeth Ferris | (Brazil) Liz Tatiane Koehler (United States) Kyra Wojcik | 7–5, 6–1 |
| Win | 2–2 | Nov 2012 | ITF Barranquilla, Colombia | 10,000 | Clay | (United States) Blair Shankle | (Colombia) María Paulina Pérez (Colombia) Paula Andrea Pérez | 7–5, 7–6 |
| Loss | 2–3 | Sep 2018 | ITF Monastir, Tunisia | 15,000 | Hard | (United Kingdom) Anna Popescu | (Spain) Paula Arias Manjón (Spain) Andrea Lázaro García | 5–7, 0–6 |
| Loss | 2–4 | Sep 2018 | ITF Monastir, Tunisia | 15,000 | Hard | (United Kingdom) Anna Popescu | (Italy) Martina Biagianti (Italy) Claudia Giovine | 1–6, 2–6 |
| Loss | 2–5 | Sep 2018 | ITF Monastir, Tunisia | 15,000 | Hard | (United Kingdom) Anna Popescu | (Tunisia) Chiraz Bechri (Serbia) Barbara Bonić | 4–6, 4–6 |
| Win | 3–5 | May 2019 | ITF Tacarigua, Trinidad & Tobago | 15,000 | Hard | (United States) Sabastiani Leon | (Poland) Olga Brózda (Poland) Paulina Jastrzebska | 7–5, 6–4 |
| Win | 4–5 | May 2019 | ITF Tacarigua, Trinidad & Tobago | 15,000 | Hard | (United States) Sabastiani Leon | (Poland) Olga Brózda (Poland) Paulina Jastrzebska | 6–4, 6–3 |
| Loss | 4–6 | Jul 2019 | ITF Lima, Peru | 15,000 | Clay | (Paraguay) Lara Escauriza | (United States) Madeleine Kobelt (Russia) Anna Makhorkina | 5–7, 6–2, [4–10] |
| Loss | 4–7 | Jul 2019 | ITF Lima, Peru | 15,000 | Clay | (Romania) Diana Maria Mihail | (Chile) Fernanda Labraña (Ecuador) Camila Romero | 2–6, 4–6 |
| Win | 5–7 | Sep 2019 | ITF Tabarka, Tunisia | 15,000 | Clay | (United Kingdom) Anna Popescu | (Italy) Giorgia Pinto (Italy) Gaia Squarcialupi | 4–6, 6–1, [12–10] |
| Loss | 5–8 | Sep 2019 | ITF Tabarka, Tunisia | 15,000 | Clay | (United Kingdom) Anna Popescu | (Germany) Natalia Siedliska (Russia) Anna Ureke | 6–7^{(1)}, 6–1, [8–10] |
| Win | 6–8 | Nov 2019 | ITF Monastir, Tunisia | 15,000 | Hard | (Lithuania) Justina Mikulskytė | (Egypt) Lamis Alhussein Abdel Aziz (Gabon) Celestine Avomo Ella | 7–6^{(6)}, 7–6^{(2)} |
| Loss | 6–9 | Dec 2019 | ITF Monastir, Tunisia | 15,000 | Hard | (Italy) Aurora Zantedeschi | (Spain) Yvonne Cavallé Reimers (Serbia) Bojana Marinković | 7–5, 2–6, [9–11] |
| Loss | 6–10 | Oct 2021 | ITF Cancún, Mexico | 15,000 | Hard | (United States) Rushri Wijesundera | (Latvia) Darja Semenistaja (United States) Anna Ulyashchenko | 4–6, 4–6 |
| Loss | 6–11 | Sep 2022 | ITF Cancún, Mexico | 15,000 | Hard | (Mexico) Jessica Hinojosa Gomez | (Dominican Republic) Kelly Williford (United States) Anna Ulyashchenko | 6–7^{(5)}, 6–4, [6–10] |
