= Alyssa Mayo =

American tennis player

- Country (sports): United States
- Born: 10 February 2000 (age 25); Naples, Florida, United States
- Height: 1.80 m (5 ft 11 in)
- Plays: Right-handed (two-handed backhand)
- Prize money: $189

Singles
- Career record: 1–4
- Career titles: 0

Doubles
- Career record: 0–2
- Career titles: 0
- Last updated on: 10 April 2017.

Alyssa Mayo (born 10 February 2000) is an American tennis player.

Mayo made her WTA main draw debut at the 2017 Copa Colsanitas in the singles draw facing Sachia Vickery.
