= Antonia Samudio =

Colombian tennis player (born 2001)

- Country (sports): Colombia
- Born: 27 March 2001 (age 23)
- Plays: Right-handed
- Prize money: $21,679

Singles
- Career record: 30–63
- Career titles: 0
- Highest ranking: No. 853 (8 August 2022)

Doubles
- Career record: 40–40
- Career titles: 1 ITF
- Highest ranking: No. 761 (8 November 2021)
- Last updated on: 5 August 2023.

Antonia Samudio (born 27 March 2001) is a Colombian tennis player.

Samudio has a career-high singles ranking by the Women's Tennis Association (WTA) of 853, achieved on 8 August 2022. She also has a career-high WTA doubles ranking of 761, achieved on 8 November 2021.

== Career ==
Samudio made her WTA Tour main-draw debut at the 2021 Copa Colsanitas, where she received a wildcard into the doubles tournament partnering Jessica Plazas. She made also her singles WTA Tour main-draw debut there in 2023, again as a wildcard, losing to Laura Pigossi in the first round.

== ITF Circuit finals ==
Legend
W35 tournaments
W15 tournaments

=== Doubles: 6 (1 title, 5 runner–ups) ===
Result	W–L	Date	Tournament	Tier	Surface	Partner	Opponents	Score
Loss	0–1	Apr 2019	ITF Bucaramanga, Colombia	15,000	Clay	(Colombia) Yuliana Lizarazo	(Chile) Fernanda Brito (Colombia) María Paulina Pérez	2–6, 2–6
Loss	0–2	Aug 2019	ITF La Paz, Bolivia	15,000	Clay	(Peru) Romina Ccuno	(Argentina) Jazmín Ortenzi (Bolivia) Noelia Zeballos	2–6, 6–1, [4–10]
Loss	0–3	Oct 2019	ITF Santiago, Chile	15,000	Clay	(Ecuador) Mell Reasco	(Peru) Romina Ccuno (Guatemala) Melissa Morales	3–6, 3–6
Loss	0–4	Sep 2021	ITF Ibagué, Colombia	15,000	Clay	(Slovakia) Alica Rusová	(Peru) Romina Ccuno (Colombia) María Camila Torres Murcia	6–3, 4–6, [5–10]
Win	1–4	Nov 2022	ITF Nules, Spain	15,000	Clay	(Chile) Jimar Geraldine Gerald González	(Germany) Laura Böhner (Serbia) Mihaela Đaković	7–5, 2–6, [8–6] ret.
Loss	1–5	Dec 2022	ITF Valencia, Spain	15,000	Clay	(Chile) Jimar Geraldine Gerald González	(Spain) Candela Aparisi (Spain) Lucía Marzal Martínez	5–7, 0–6
