= Astra Sharma =

Australian tennis player (born 1995)

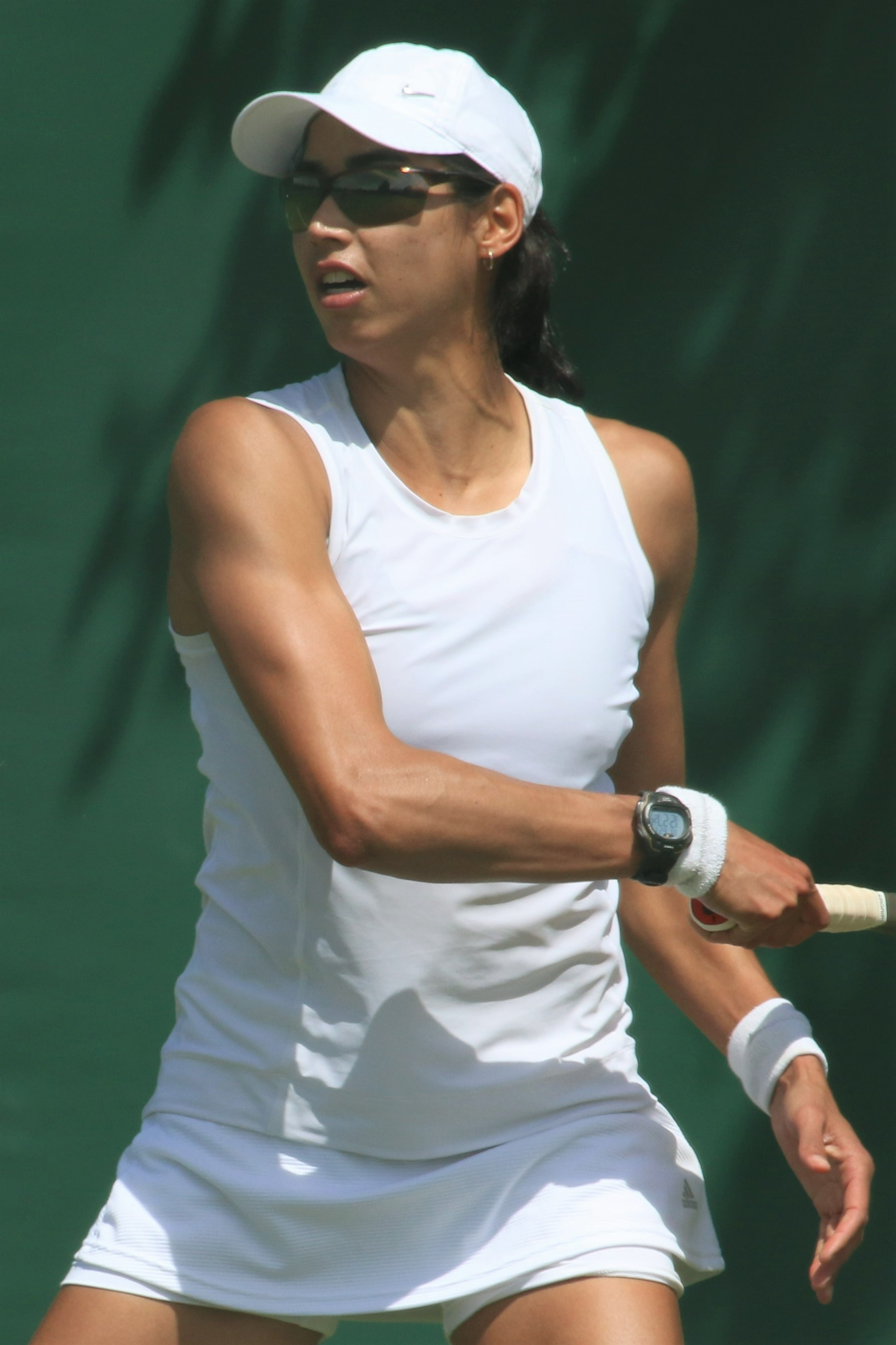
- Sharma at the 2022 Wimbledon Championships
- Country (sports): Australia
- Residence: Perth, Western Australia
- Born: 11 September 1995 (age 31) Singapore
- Height: 1.78 m (5 ft 10 in)
- Plays: Right (two-handed backhand)
- Coach: David Taylor
- Prize money: US$ 2,193,796

Singles
- Career record: 280–204
- Career titles: 1
- Highest ranking: No. 84 (21 February 2022)
- Current ranking: No. 576 (19 October 2026)

Grand Slam singles results
- Australian Open: 2R (2019)
- French Open: 2R (2020, 2021)
- Wimbledon: 1R (2019, 2021, 2022)
- US Open: 1R (2019, 2020, 2021)

Doubles
- Career record: 122–105
- Career titles: 3
- Highest ranking: No. 91 (21 February 2022)
- Current ranking: No. 786 (19 October 2026)

Grand Slam doubles results
- Australian Open: 1R (2018, 2019, 2020, 2021, 2023, 2024, 2026)
- French Open: 1R (2019, 2020, 2021)
- Wimbledon: 2R (2019)
- US Open: 1R (2021)

Grand Slam mixed doubles results
- Australian Open: F (2019)
- Last updated on: 24 October 2026.

Astra Sharma (born 11 September 1995) is an Australian professional tennis player. She has career-high WTA rankings of 84 in singles and 91 in doubles. Sharma has won one singles title and three doubles titles on the WTA Tour. In addition, she has won one singles title on the WTA Challenger Tour as well as eleven titles in singles and seven in doubles on the ITF World Tour.

In December 2017, she won the Australian Open Wildcard Playoff alongside Belinda Woolcock, their main-draw entry into the 2018 Australian Open.

At the 2019 Australian Open, she and fellow Australian John-Patrick Smith reached the final of the mixed-doubles competition after receiving a wildcard to enter the main draw.

== Early life ==
Sharma's father, Devdutt Sharma, is a Singaporean Indian with roots from Azamgarh, Uttar Pradesh, Northern India. He was a high jumper. He attended Raffles Institution and National University of Singapore. He worked as an acoustic engineer. Astra's mother, Susan Tan, is a Singaporean Chinese. She was a sprinter from CHIJ Saint Theresa's Convent. Astra, named after the Astras wielded by the Hindu gods, has a younger brother Astron who also went into a tennis career.

Astra was born and raised in Singapore, before her parents emigrated to Perth, Western Australia in 2005, when she was ten years old. She attended Applecross Senior High School. As a junior, she did some training at Bull Creek Tennis Club, near Willetton.

== Career ==
=== 2011–2014: The beginnings ===
Sharma made her ITF Circuit debut in October 2011, after qualifying in Kargoorlie. In 2012, Sharma played just four tournaments, without a win. In March 2013, she reached the quarterfinals in doubles at an ITF event in Sydney. In 2014, she competed in qualifying in three tournaments across the U.S., making the main draw in just one, where she lost in the first round.

In 2015, Sharma played just three tournaments on the ITF Circuit, reaching the quarterfinal or better in all three. She won her first title in July 2015 at Sharm El Sheikh, Egypt. Sharma ended the season with a singles rank of 787. She also received a scholarship to Vanderbilt University, graduating in 2018, majoring in medicine, Health and Society, along the way helping the Commodores win their first NCAA team tournament in 2015, with various honors such as a selection to the 2014 SEC All Freshman team and being the 2017 SEC Player of the Year. Originally intent on becoming an orthopedic surgeon, she decided not to continue in medical school as her professional tennis career took off. Still in 2022, she used a partnership between the WTA and the University of Florida to earn a master's degree in Applied Physiology and Kinesiology.

=== 2016–2018: ITF Circuit success ===
In 2016, Sharma competed on the European ITF Circuit. She experienced little singles success but partnering Frances Altick, won two doubles titles in July.

She commenced the next season in June, qualifying and making the main draw in Sumter, U.S. Across July and August 2017, Sharma won her second and third ITF titles in Târgu Jiu and Graz. She ended the year with a singles rank of 440.

In 2018, Sharma competed mostly on ITF events across North America. In March, she reached the final of the ITF event in Orlando. In June and July, she won her fourth and fifth singles titles in Baton Rouge and Gatineau, Canada. In October, she returned to Australia and reached the quarterfinals in three consecrative tournaments. Sharma ended 2018 with a singles rank of 225.

=== 2019: First WTA Tour final ===
In January 2019, Sharma qualified for the Australian Open and won her first-round match over fellow Australian Priscilla Hon, before losing in the second round. In mixed doubles, she and John-Patrick Smith made it through to the final, after they defeated the second seed team of Bruno Soares and Nicole Melichar in the semifinals, but lost to the third seeds, Barbora Krejčíková and Rajeev Ram. In March, Sharma won the $25k singles and doubles at Irapuato, Mexico. In April, Sharma reached her first WTA Tour final, losing to Amanda Anisimova at the Copa Colsanitas. In May, she qualified for and reached the second round of the Strasbourg International, and later lost in the first round at the French Open. Sharma competed in qualifying events across the European grass-court season and lost in the first round of Wimbledon. In August, she travelled to North America and qualified for Cincinnati. At the US Open, Sharma lost in the first round. She ended the year with a singles rank of 108, and a doubles rank of 136.

=== 2020: French Open match win ===
Sharma started 2020, losing in the singles and doubles first rounds of both Hobart International and Australian Open. For the mixed doubles, she partnered again with John-Patrick Smith, and they reached the semifinals in Melbourne. In March, Sharma reached the second round of the Monterrey Open and the quarterfinal of the ITF event in Irapuato, Mexico, before the tour was stopped due to the COVID-19 pandemic.

At the US Open, Sharma lost in the first round to 19th seed Dayana Yastremska in a third set tie-breaker. She qualified for the French Open and reached the second round of this year's much later held event.

=== 2021: WTA Tour title, top 100 ===
Sharma defeated top seed Ons Jabeur to win the MUSC Health Women's Open (Charleston II), her first career title.

In May, she made the second round of the French Open for a second consecutive year. In June, she entered Wimbledon as a lucky loser and was defeated by Kristýna Plíšková in the first round.

At the US Open, she qualified before losing to eighth seed Barbora Krejčíková in the first round. In October, she reached the second round at the Indian Wells Open.

Sharma ended 2021 with a singles ranking of 98, a career year-end high, and a doubles ranking of world No. 107.

=== 2022–2024 ===
In 2022, Sharma reached the second round at Indian Wells with a win over Magda Linette, before losing to 13th seed Victoria Azarenka.

In 2024, she entered the Charleston Open as a lucky loser and defeated compatriot Arina Rodionova and 16th seed Lesia Tsurenko to reach the round of 16 where she lost to third seed Maria Sakkari.

Partnering Veronika Erjavec, Sharma was runner-up in the doubles at the WTA 125 Canberra International, losing in the final to Veronika Erjavec and Darja Semeņistaja.

== Performance timelines ==
Key
W	F	SF	QF	#R	RR	Q#	P#	DNQ	A	Z#	PO	G	S	B	NMS	NTI	P	NH

(W) winner; (F) finalist; (SF) semifinalist; (QF) quarterfinalist; (#R) rounds 4, 3, 2, 1; (RR) round-robin stage; (Q#) qualification round; (P#) preliminary round; (DNQ) did not qualify; (A) absent; (Z#) Davis/Fed Cup Zonal Group (with number indication) or (PO) play-off; (G) gold, (S) silver or (B) bronze Olympic/Paralympic medal; (NMS) not a Masters tournament; (NTI) not a Tier I tournament; (P) postponed; (NH) not held; (SR) strike rate (events won / competed); (W–L) win–loss record.
To avoid confusion and double counting, these charts are updated at the conclusion of a tournament or when the player's participation has ended.

Only main-draw results in WTA Tour, Grand Slam tournaments, Billie Jean King Cup, United Cup, Hopman Cup and Olympic Games are included in win–loss records.

=== Singles ===
Current through the 2026 US Open.

Tournament	2019	2020	2021	2022	2023	2024	2025	2026	SR	W–L	Win %
Grand Slam tournaments
Australian Open	2R	1R	1R	1R	Q2	Q2	Q2	Q1	0 / 4	1–4	20%
French Open	1R	2R	2R	1R	A	Q3	Q2	A	0 / 4	2–4	33%
Wimbledon	1R	NH	1R	1R	A	Q1	Q1	A	0 / 3	0–3	0%
US Open	1R	1R	1R	Q3	Q1	Q2	Q2	Q1	0 / 3	0–3	0%
Win–loss	1–4	1–3	1–4	0–3	0–0	0–0	0–0	0–0	0 / 14	3–14	18%
WTA 1000 tournaments
Dubai / Qatar Opens (Note: The first Premier 5 event of the year has switched back and forth between the Dubai Tennis Championships and the Qatar Ladies Open since 2009. Dubai was classified as a Premier 5 event from 2009 to 2011 before being succeeded by Doha for the 2012–2014 period. In 2015, Dubai regained its Premier 5 status while Doha was demoted to Premier status. The Premier 5 tournaments were reclassified as WTA 1000 tournaments in 2021.)	A	A	A	Q1	A	A	A	A	0 / 0	0–0	–
Indian Wells Open	A	NH	2R	2R	A	A	A	A	0 / 2	2–2	50%
Miami Open	A	NH	Q1	1R	A	A	A	A	0 / 1	0–1	0%
Madrid Open	A	NH	A	A	A	Q2	A	A	0 / 0	0–0	–
Italian Open	A	A	A	A	A	Q1	A	A	0 / 0	0–0	–
Canadian Open	Q1	NH	Q1	A	A	A	Q1	A	0 / 0	0–0	–
Cincinnati Open	1R	Q2	Q1	A	A	A	Q1	A	0 / 1	0–1	0%
Wuhan Open	A	NH			A	A	A	A	0 / 0	0–0	–
China Open	Q1	NH			A	A	Q1	A	0 / 0	0–0	–
Guadalajara Open	NH			A	A	A	A	A	0 / 0	0–0	–
Career statistics
Tournaments	10	5	12	11	1	1	0	0	Career total: 40		
Titles	0	0	1	0	0	0	0	0	Career total: 1		
Finals	1	0	1	0	0	0	0	0	Career total: 2		
Overall win–loss	7–10	2–5	12–11	3–11	0–1	1–1	0–0	0–0	1 / 40	26–39	40%
Year-end ranking	108	128	96	231	120	249	156		$2,193,796		

=== Doubles ===
Current through the 2024 US Open.

Tournament	2018	2019	2020	2021	2022	2023	2024	SR	W–L	Win %
Grand Slam tournaments
Australian Open	1R	1R	1R	1R	A	1R	1R	0 / 6	0–6	0%
French Open	A	1R	1R	1R	A	A	A	0 / 3	0–3	0%
Wimbledon	A	2R	NH	A	1R	A	A	0 / 2	1–2	33%
US Open	A	A	A	1R	A	A	A	0 / 1	0–1	0%
Win–Loss	0–1	1–3	0–2	0–3	0–1	0–1	0–1	0 / 12	1–12	8%
Career statistics
Tournaments	1	6	5	13	9	1	1	Career total: 36		
Titles	0	1	0	1	1	0	0	Career total: 3		
Finals	0	1	0	2	1	0	0	Career total: 4		
Overall win–loss	0–1	4–5	2–5	11–12	8–8	0–1	0–1	3 / 36	25–33	44%
Year-end ranking	327	136	109	107	117	204	403			

=== Mixed doubles ===
Tournament	2019	2020	2021	2022	2023	SR	W–L
Australian Open	F	SF	1R	1R	A	0 / 4	7–4
French Open	A	NH	A	A	A	0 / 0	0–0
Wimbledon	A	NH	A	A	A	0 / 0	0–0
US Open	A	NH	A	A	A	0 / 0	0–0
Win–Loss	4–1	3–1	0–1	0–1	0–0	0 / 4	7–4

== Grand Slam tournament finals ==
=== Mixed doubles: 1 (runner-up) ===
Result	Year	Tournament	Surface	Partner	Opponents	Score
Loss	2019	Australian Open	Hard	(Australia) John-Patrick Smith	(Czech Republic) Barbora Krejčíková (United States) Rajeev Ram	6–7^{(3–7)}, 1–6

== WTA Tour finals ==
=== Singles: 2 (1 title, 1 runner-up) ===
Legend WTA 250 (Note: The WTA International tournaments were reclassified as WTA 250 tournaments in 2021.) (1–1)	Finals by surface Clay (1–1)

Result	W–L	Date	Tournament	Tier	Surface	Opponent	Score
Loss	0–1	Apr 2019	Copa Colsanitas, Colombia	International	Clay	(United States) Amanda Anisimova	6–4, 4–6, 1–6
Win	1–1	Apr 2021	Charleston Open, United States	WTA 250	Clay	(Tunisia) Ons Jabeur	2–6, 7–5, 6–1

=== Doubles: 4 (3 titles, 1 runner-up) ===
Legend WTA 500 WTA 250 (3–1)	Finals by surface Hard (1–0) Clay (2–1)

Result	W–L	Date	Tournament	Tier	Surface	Partner	Opponents	Score
Win	1–0	Apr 2019	Copa Colsanitas, Colombia	International	Clay	(Australia) Zoe Hives	(United States) Hayley Carter (United States) Ena Shibahara	6–1, 6–2
Win	2–0	Mar 2021	Abierto Zapopan, Mexico	WTA 250	Hard	(Australia) Ellen Perez	(United States) Desirae Krawczyk (Mexico) Giuliana Olmos	6–4, 6–4
Loss	2–1	Jul 2021	Hamburg Open, Germany	WTA 250	Clay	(Netherlands) Rosalie van der Hoek	(Italy) Jasmine Paolini (Switzerland) Jil Teichmann	0–6, 4–6
Win	3–1	Apr 2022	Copa Colsanitas, Colombia (2)	WTA 250	Clay	(Indonesia) Aldila Sutjiadi	(United States) Emina Bektas (United Kingdom) Tara Moore	4–6, 6–4, [11–9]

== WTA 125 finals ==
=== Singles: 1 (title) ===
Result	W-L	Date	Tournament	Surface	Opponent	Score
Win	1–0	Sep 2023	Open Romania Ladies, Romania	Clay	(Italy) Sara Errani	0–6, 7–5, 6–2

=== Doubles: 1 (runner-up) ===
Result	W–L	Date	Tournament	Surface	Partner	Opponents	Score
Loss	0–1	Jan 2024	Canberra International, Australia	Hard	(Australia) Kaylah McPhee	(Slovenia) Veronika Erjavec (Latvia) Darja Semeņistaja	2–6, 4–6

== ITF Circuit finals ==
=== Singles: 17 (11 titles, 6 runner-ups) ===
Legend W100 tournaments (1–0) $60,000 tournaments (1–2) $40,000 tournaments (1–1) $25,000 tournaments (4–2) $10/15,000 tournaments (4–1)	Finals by surface Hard (8–2) Clay (3–4)

Result	W–L	Date	Tournament	Tier	Surface	Opponent	Score
Win	1–0	Jul 2015	ITF Sharm El Sheikh, Egypt	10,000	Hard	(Egypt) Ola Abou Zekry	6–3, 2–6, 6–0
Win	2–0	Jul 2017	ITF Târgu Jiu, Romania	15,000	Clay	(Australia) Belinda Woolcock	1–6, 6–2, 7–5
Win	3–0	Aug 2017	ITF Graz, Austria	15,000	Clay	(Czech Republic) Vendula Žovincová	2–6, 6–3, 6–2
Loss	3–1	Oct 2017	ITF Toowoomba, Australia	25,000	Hard	(Japan) Eri Hozumi	5–7, 2–6
Loss	3–2	Mar 2018	ITF Orlando, United States	15,000	Clay	(United States) Sophie Chang	3–6, 6–7^{(6–8)}
Win	4–2	Jun 2018	ITF Baton Rouge, United States	25,000	Hard	(United States) Maria Mateas	6–2, 6–1
Win	5–2	Jul 2018	Challenger de Gatineau, Canada	25,000	Hard	(Mexico) Victoria Rodríguez	3–6, 6–4, 6–3
Win	6–2	Sep 2018	ITF Cairns, Australia	25,000	Hard	(Australia) Destanee Aiava	0–6, 7–6^{(7–5)}, 6–1
Win	7–2	Mar 2019	ITF Irapuato, Mexico	W25	Hard	(Paraguay) Verónica Cepede Royg	6–7^{(3–7)}, 6–4, 6–3
Loss	7–3	Jun 2023	ITF Ystad, Sweden	W40	Clay	(Turkey) İpek Öz	1–6, 3–6
Loss	7–4	Jul 2023	Open de Montpellier, France	W60	Clay	(France) Clara Burel	3–6, 5–7
Win	8–4	Oct 2023	Playford International, Australia	W60	Hard	(Chinese Taipei) Joanna Garland	7–6^{(8–6)}, 6–0
Loss	8–5	Oct 2023	Sydney Open, Australia	W60	Hard	(Australia) Destanee Aiava	3–6, 4–6
Loss	8–6	Mar 2025	ITF Sabadell, Spain	W35	Clay	(Spain) Guiomar Maristany	3–6, 3–6
Win	9–6	Apr 2025	Bonita Springs Championship, US	W100	Clay	(United States) Whitney Osuigwe	6–2, 6–2
Win	10–6	Sep 2026	ITF Nashville, United States	W15	Hard	(Netherlands) Rose Marie Nijkamp	6–3, 6–1
Win	11–6	Oct 2026	Lexington Pro Classic, United States	W50	Hard	(United States) Kaitlyn Carnicella	6–2, 6–1

=== Doubles: 12 (7 titles, 5 runner-ups) ===
Legend $100,000 tournaments (0–1) $80,000 tournaments (0–1) $60,000 tournaments (1–1) $40,000 tournaments (2–0) $25,000 tournaments (2–2) $10,000 tournaments (2–0)	Finals by surface Hard (2–3) Clay (5–2)

Result	W–L	Date	Tournament	Tier	Surface	Partner	Opponents	Score
Win	1–0	Jul 2016	ITF Amstelveen, Netherlands	10,000	Clay	(United States) Frances Altick	(Netherlands) Erika Vogelsang (Netherlands) Mandy Wagemaker	6–4, 6–2
Win	2–0	Jul 2016	ITF Knokke, Belgium	10,000	Clay	(United States) Frances Altick	(Belgium) Déborah Kerfs (Netherlands) Kelly Versteeg	6–4, 6–4
Loss	2–1	Oct 2017	ITF Cairns, Australia	25,000	Hard	(Australia) Belinda Woolcock	(Australia) Naiktha Bains (Papua New Guinea) Abigail Tere-Apisah	6–4, 2–6, [6–10]
Win	3–1	Jun 2018	ITF Sumter, United States	25,000	Hard	(Brazil) Luisa Stefani	(United States) Julia Elbaba (China) Xu Shilin	2–6, 6–3, [10–5]
Loss	3–2	Jun 2018	ITF Baton Rouge, US	25,000	Hard	(Romania) Gabriela Talabă	(United States) Hayley Carter (United States) Ena Shibahara	3–6, 4–6
Win	4–2	Mar 2019	ITF Irapuato, Mexico	W25	Hard	(New Zealand) Paige Hourigan	(Paraguay) Verónica Cepede Royg (Czech Republic) Renata Voráčová	6–1, 4–6, [12–10]
Loss	4–3	Apr 2019	Dothan Pro Classic, US	W80	Clay	(Australia) Destanee Aiava	(United States) Usue Maitane Arconada (United States) Caroline Dolehide	6–7^{(5)}, 4–6
Loss	4–4	Nov 2020	ITF Charleston Pro, US	100,000	Clay	(Egypt) Mayar Sherif	(Poland) Magdalena Fręch (Poland) Katarzyna Kawa	6–4, 4–6, [2–10]
Win	5–4	May 2023	ITF Naples, United States	W60	Clay	(United States) Christina Rosca	(United States) Sophie Chang (United States) Angela Kulikov	6–1, 7–6^{(13)}
Win	6–4	Jun 2023	ITF Ystad, Sweden	W40	Clay	(Ukraine) Valeriya Strakhova	(Switzerland) Jenny Dürst (Sweden) Fanny Östlund	4–6, 7–6^{(3)}, [11–9]
Win	7–4	Sep 2023	ITF Kuršumlijska Banja, Serbia	W40	Clay	(Ukraine) Valeriya Strakhova	Anastasia Gasanova; Ekaterina Makarova	6–1, 6–4
Loss	7–5	Oct 2023	Playford International, Australia	W60	Hard	(Australia) Kaylah McPhee	(Australia) Talia Gibson (Australia) Priscilla Hon	1–6, 2–6
