= Jessica Plazas =

Colombian beach tennis player (born 2002)

- Country (sports): Colombia
- Born: 26 March 2002 (age 23)
- Plays: Right-handed (two-handed backhand)
- Prize money: $17,794

Singles
- Career record: 3–6
- Career titles: 0

Doubles
- Career record: 3–5
- Career titles: 0

Jessica Plazas (born 26 March 2002) is a Colombian beach tennis and former tennis player.

Plazas has a career-high ITF junior ranking of 345, achieved on 9 April 2018.

She made her WTA Tour main-draw debut at the 2018 Copa Colsanitas in the doubles draw, partnering Camila Osorio. She was given a wildcard to the main draw at the 2021 edition, losing in the first round to Lara Arruabarrena. Her last match on the pro tour before she changed for beach tennis was in March 2022.
