= 2003 Copa Colsanitas – Doubles =

Tennis tournament event

Doubles
- 2003 Copa Colsanitas

Final
- Champions: (Slovenia) Katarina Srebotnik (Sweden) Åsa Svensson
- Runners-up: (Slovenia) Tina Križan (Ukraine) Tatiana Perebiynis
- Score: 6–2, 6–1

Details
- Draw: 16
- Seeds: 4

Events
Singles	Doubles
← 2002 ·	Copa Colsanitas	· 2004 →

Virginia Ruano Pascual and Paola Suárez were the defending champions, but Ruano Pascual did not compete this year. Suárez teamed up with Fabiola Zuluaga and lost in semifinals to Tina Križan and Tatiana Perebiynis.

Katarina Srebotnik and Åsa Svensson won the title by defeating Tina Križan and Tatiana Perebiynis 6–2, 6–1 in the final.

== Seeds ==
1. (Slovenia) Katarina Srebotnik / (Sweden) Åsa Svensson (champions)
2. (Slovenia) Tina Križan / (Ukraine) Tatiana Perebiynis (final)
3. (Italy) Flavia Pennetta / (Argentina) María Emilia Salerni (quarterfinals)
4. (Hungary) Katalin Marosi / (United States) Samantha Reeves (semifinals)

== Draw ==
=== Key ===
- Q = Qualifier
- WC = Wild card
- LL = Lucky loser
- Alt = Alternate
- SE = Special exempt
- PR = Protected ranking
- ITF = ITF entry
- JE = Junior exempt
- w/o = Walkover
- r = Retired
- d = Defaulted
- SR = Special ranking

=== Draw ===
First round
1	(Slovenia) K Srebotnik (Sweden) Å Svensson	6	6
(Russia) A Rodionova (Germany) M Weingärtner	3	2
(Argentina) G Dulko (Venezuela) M Sequera	7^{7}	6
(Argentina) J Cravero (Argentina) M Díaz Oliva	6^{5}	2
4	(Hungary) K Marosi (United States) S Reeves	6	6
(Argentina) E Krauth (Brazil) V Menga	3	2
(Croatia) I Abramović (Russia) O Kalyuzhnaya	2	4
(Spain) MJ Martínez Sánchez (Spain) A Medina Garrigues	6	6
(United States) A Cargill (Canada) M Marois	0	2
(Argentina) P Suárez (Colombia) F Zuluaga	6	6
(Spain) C Martínez Granados (Uruguay) AL Migliarini de León	3	3
3	(Italy) F Pennetta (Argentina) ME Salerni	6	6
Q	(Colombia) R Farah (Colombia) V Núñez Fuentes	7^{7}	1	2
(Spain) N Llagostera Vives (Spain) C Torrens Valero	6^{3}	6	6
WC	(Colombia) C Castaño (Spain) L Domínguez Lino	4	4
2	(Slovenia) T Križan (Ukraine) T Perebiynis	6	6

Quarterfinals
1	(Slovenia) K Srebotnik (Sweden) Å Svensson	7	6
(Argentina) G Dulko (Venezuela) M Sequera	5	3
4	(Hungary) K Marosi (United States) S Reeves	3	6	6
(Spain) MJ Martínez Sánchez (Spain) A Medina Garrigues	6	3	3
(Argentina) P Suárez (Colombia) F Zuluaga	6	6
3	(Italy) F Pennetta (Argentina) ME Salerni	1	4
(Spain) N Llagostera Vives (Spain) C Torrens Valero	2	3
2	(Slovenia) T Križan (Ukraine) T Perebiynis	6	6

Semifinals
1	(Slovenia) K Srebotnik (Sweden) Å Svensson	6	6
4	(Hungary) K Marosi (United States) S Reeves	3	4
(Argentina) P Suárez (Colombia) F Zuluaga	3	7^{7}	3
2	(Slovenia) T Križan (Ukraine) T Perebiynis	6	6^{4}	6

Final
1	(Slovenia) K Srebotnik (Sweden) Å Svensson	6	6
2	(Slovenia) T Križan (Ukraine) T Perebiynis	2	1
