= 2004 Copa Colsanitas Seguros Bolívar – Singles =

Singles
- 2004 Copa Colsanitas Seguros Bolívar

Final
- Champion: (Colombia) Fabiola Zuluaga
- Runner-up: (Spain) María Sánchez Lorenzo
- Score: 3–6, 6–4, 6–2

Details
- Draw: 30
- Seeds: 8

Events
Singles	Doubles
← 2003 ·	Copa Colsanitas	· 2005 →

Defending champion Fabiola Zuluaga defeated María Sánchez Lorenzo in the final, 3–6, 6–4, 6–2 to win the singles tennis title at the 2004 Copa Colsanitas.

== Seeds ==
The first two seeds received a bye into the second round.

1. (Colombia) Fabiola Zuluaga (champion)
2. (Spain) María Sánchez Lorenzo (final)
3. (France) Émilie Loit (semifinals)
4. (United States) Ashley Harkleroad (first round)
5. (Spain) Anabel Medina Garrigues (second round)
6. (Slovakia) Ľudmila Cervanová (quarterfinals)
7. (Spain) Arantxa Parra Santonja (first round)
8. (Hungary) Melinda Czink (second round)

== Draw ==
=== Key ===
- Q = Qualifier
- WC = Wild card
- LL = Lucky loser
- Alt = Alternate
- SE = Special exempt
- PR = Protected ranking
- ITF = ITF entry
- JE = Junior exempt
- w/o = Walkover
- r = Retired
- d = Defaulted
- SR = Special ranking

=== Finals ===
Semifinals
1	(Colombia) Fabiola Zuluaga	6	0	7^{7}
(Slovakia) Ľubomíra Kurhajcová	2	6	6^{4}
3	(France) Émilie Loit	5	2
2	(Spain) María Sánchez Lorenzo	7	6

Final
1	(Colombia) Fabiola Zuluaga	3	6	6
2	(Spain) María Sánchez Lorenzo	6	4	2

=== Top half ===
First round
(Spain) N Llagostera Vives	7^{7}	1	1
Q	(Ukraine) A Bondarenko	6^{1}	6	6
(Colombia) C Castaño	6	5	6
(Italy) F Pennetta	3	7	3
(United States) S Reeves	2	2
5	(Spain) A Medina Garrigues	6	6
4	(United States) A Harkleroad	4	6^{1}
(Spain) M Marrero	6	7^{7}
(Italy) Ad Serra Zanetti	2	2
(Slovakia) Ľ Kurhajcová	6	6
WC	(United States) M Falcon	6	6
(Spain) G León García	2	2
(Italy) T Garbin	6^{5}	6	3
6	(Slovakia) Ľ Cervanová	7^{7}	4	6

Second round
1	(Colombia) F Zuluaga	6	6
Q	(Ukraine) A Bondarenko	0	0
(Colombia) C Castaño	4	6	7^{7}
5	(Spain) A Medina Garrigues	6	1	6^{5}
(Spain) M Marrero	7	1	3
(Slovakia) Ľ Kurhajcová	5	6	6
WC	(United States) M Falcon	2	6	1
6	(Slovakia) Ľ Cervanová	6	3	6

Quarterfinals
1	(Colombia) F Zuluaga	6	6
(Colombia) C Castaño	3	0
(Slovakia) Ľ Kurhajcová	6	7^{7}
6	(Slovakia) Ľ Cervanová	4	6^{4}

Semifinals
1	(Colombia) F Zuluaga	6	0	7^{7}
(Slovakia) Ľ Kurhajcová	2	6	6^{4}

=== Bottom half ===
First round
8	(Hungary) M Czink	6	2	7^{7}
Q	(Canada) MÈ Pelletier	3	6	6^{3}
(Czech Republic) E Birnerová	6^{3}	3
(Spain) C Martínez Granados	7^{7}	6
WC	(Spain) L Domínguez Lino	3	6	6
Q	(Brazil) MF Alves	6	3	1
LL	(Romania) E Gallovits	2	2
3	(France) É Loit	6	6
7	(Spain) A Parra Santonja	5	4
Q	(Croatia) L Popadić	7	6
(Italy) An Serra Zanetti	6	6
(Venezuela) M Sequera	2	3
(Germany) J Schruff	1	1
PR	(Austria) B Schwartz	6	6

Second round
8	(Hungary) M Czink	4	6	6^{8}
(Spain) C Martínez Granados	6	3	7^{10}
WC	(Spain) L Domínguez Lino	6^{2}	6	4
3	(France) É Loit	7^{7}	0	6
Q	(Croatia) L Popadić	6	6
(Italy) An Serra Zanetti	2	3
PR	(Austria) B Schwartz	6	4	5
2	(Spain) M Sánchez Lorenzo	4	6	7

Quarterfinals
(Spain) C Martínez Granados	6^{5}	7^{7}	2
3	(France) É Loit	7^{7}	6^{4}	6
Q	(Croatia) L Popadić	6	4	0
2	(Spain) M Sánchez Lorenzo	3	6	6

Semifinals
3	(France) É Loit	5	2
2	(Spain) M Sánchez Lorenzo	7	6
