= 2004 Vancouver Women's Open – Singles =

Singles
- 2004 Vancouver Women's Open

Final
- Champion: (Czech Republic) Nicole Vaidišová
- Runner-up: (United States) Laura Granville
- Score: 2–6, 6–4, 6–2

Events
Singles	Doubles
- Vancouver Open

This was the first WTA edition of the tournament; the previous editions were ITF events.

Anna-Lena Grönefeld was the defending champion from 2003, but lost in the second round to Sessil Karatantcheva.

Nicole Vaidišová won the title, defeating Laura Granville in the final. At 15 years and 3 months of age, Vaidišová became the 6th youngest woman to win a Pro-level title, and the youngest since 1997.

== Seeds ==
1. (France) Marion Bartoli (second round)
2. (Venezuela) Milagros Sequera (quarterfinals)
3. (Russia) Alina Jidkova (semifinals)
4. (United States) Laura Granville (finals, runner-up)
5. (United States) Marissa Irvin (second round)
6. (Italy) Rita Grande (quarterfinals)
7. (Germany) Anna-Lena Grönefeld (second round)
8. (United States) Lindsay Lee-Waters (quarterfinals)

== Draw ==
Key

- Q = Qualifier
- WC = Wild card
- LL = Lucky loser
- Alt = Alternate
- ITF = ITF entry
- PR = Protected ranking
- SR = Special ranking
- SE = Special exempt
- JE = Junior exempt
- JR = Junior Accelerator Programme entrant
- CO = College Accelerator Programme entrant
- NG = Next Gen Accelerator Program entrant
- w/o = Walkover
- r = Retired
- d = Defaulted

=== Finals ===
Semifinals
(France) Camille Pin	6^{5}	6	4
4	(United States) Laura Granville	7	4	6
3	(Russia) Alina Jidkova	5	6	4
Q	(Czech Republic) Nicole Vaidišová	7	3	6

Final
4	(United States) Laura Granville	6	4	2
Q	(Czech Republic) Nicole Vaidišová	2	6	6

=== Top half ===
First round
1	(France) M Bartoli	6	6
(Italy) Ad Serra Zanetti	0	1
(France) S Beltrame	0	0^{r}
(France) C Pin	6	0
(Japan) Y Yoshida	2	3
Q	(Bulgaria) S Karatantcheva	6	6
Q	(Japan) S Okamoto	0	1
7	(Germany) A-L Grönefeld	6	6
4	(United States) L Granville	7	6
(United States) S Reeves	5	1
(United States) B Mattek	7	6
WC	(Canada) M Drake	5	2
(Sweden) S Arvidsson	2	4
(Russia) G Voskoboeva	6	6
(Russia) L Skavronskaia	3	4
8	(United States) L Lee-Waters	6	6

Second round
1	(France) M Bartoli	3	7	2
(France) C Pin	6	5	6
Q	(Bulgaria) S Karatantcheva	7	6
7	(Germany) A-L Grönefeld	5	4
4	(United States) L Granville	6	7
(United States) B Mattek	3	6^{4}
(Russia) G Voskoboeva	4	6^{4}
8	(United States) L Lee-Waters	6	7

Quarter Finals
(France) C Pin	6	4	6
Q	(Bulgaria) S Karatantcheva	2	6	1
4	(United States) L Granville	5	6	6
8	(United States) L Lee-Waters	7	1	4

Semi Final
(France) C Pin	6^{5}	6	4
4	(United States) L Granville	7	4	6

=== Bottom half ===
First round
6	(Italy) R Grande	6	6
(Belgium) E Callens	4	4
(France) S Foretz	3	4
(United States) J Hopkins	6	6
(China) S Peng	4	6	6
(South Africa) N Grandin	6	1	0
Q	(Argentina) MV García Sokol	7	5	1
3	(Russia) A Jidkova	5	7	6
5	(United States) M Irvin	6	6
(United States) M Tu	1	1
Q	(Czech Republic) N Vaidišová	6	6
(United States) A Spears	4	4
(Puerto Rico) V Castellvi	6	6
WC	(Canada) M-È Pelletier	0	4
(Italy) An Serra Zanetti	4	3
2	(Venezuela) M Sequera	6	6

Second round
6	(Italy) R Grande	6	6
(United States) J Hopkins	2	2
(China) S Peng	5	5
3	(Russia) A Jidkova	7	7
5	(United States) M Irvin	5	6	4
Q	(Czech Republic) N Vaidišová	7	4	6
(Puerto Rico) V Castellvi	1	5
2	(Venezuela) M Sequera	6	7

Quarter Finals
6	(Italy) R Grande	6	1	3
3	(Russia) A Jidkova	3	6	6
Q	(Czech Republic) N Vaidišová	6	6
2	(Venezuela) M Sequera	4	1

Semi Final
3	(Russia) A Jidkova	5	6	4
Q	(Czech Republic) N Vaidišová	7	3	6

== Qualifying ==
=== Seeds ===
1. (Slovakia) Jarmila Gajdošová (first round)
2. (Paraguay) Rosana de los Ríos (first round)
3. (Czech Republic) Nicole Vaidišová (qualified)
4. (Brazil) Maria Fernanda Alves (second round)
5. (Croatia) Lana Popadić (first round)
6. (China) Xie Yan-ze (second round)
7. (Germany) Sandra Klösel (first round)
8. N/A

=== Qualifiers ===
1. (Japan) Seiko Okamoto
2. (Argentina) María Vanina García Sokol
3. (Czech Republic) Nicole Vaidišová
4. (Bulgaria) Sessil Karatantcheva

=== Qualifying draw ===
==== First qualifier ====
First round
1	(Slovakia) Jarmila Gajdošová	6	3	2
WC	(Canada) Tania Rice	4	6	6
(United States) Kaysie Smashey	3	0
(Japan) Seiko Okamoto	6	6
(Canada) Stéphanie Dubois	6	4	3
(Republic of Ireland) Kelly Liggan	4	6	6
(Germany) Antonia Matic	7	6
5	(Croatia) Lana Popadić	6^{3}	4

Second round
WC	(Canada) Tania Rice	7	2	2
(Japan) Seiko Okamoto	6^{4}	6	6
(Republic of Ireland) Kelly Liggan	5	6^{4}
(Germany) Antonia Matic	7	7

Qualifying competition
(Japan) Seiko Okamoto	4	6	6
(Germany) Antonia Matic	6	2	4

==== Second qualifier ====
First round
2	(Paraguay) Rosana de los Ríos	6	1	2
(Argentina) María Vanina García Sokol	1	6	6
(Japan) Kaori Aoyama	6	7
WC	(Canada) Valérie Tétreault	4	5
(Latvia) Līga Dekmeijere	0	2
(Turkey) İpek Şenoğlu	6	6
(United States) Sunitha Rao	4	6	6
7	(Germany) Sandra Klösel	6	4	4

Second round
(Argentina) María Vanina García Sokol	6	6
(Japan) Kaori Aoyama	2	2
(Turkey) İpek Şenoğlu	6	5	2
(United States) Sunitha Rao	2	7	6

Qualifying competition
(Argentina) María Vanina García Sokol	7	1	6
(United States) Sunitha Rao	6^{3}	6	4

==== Third qualifier ====
First round
3	(Czech Republic) Nicole Vaidišová	6	4
WC	(Canada) Katarina Zoricic	3	1^{r}
(South Korea) Kim Jin-hee	3	6	6
(Canada) Mélanie Marois	6	4	1
(Netherlands) Anousjka van Exel	6	7
(United States) Diana Ospina	3	5
(Japan) Rika Fujiwara	6	6
Alt	(United States) Arpi Kojian	1	1

Second round
3	(Czech Republic) Nicole Vaidišová	6	6
(South Korea) Kim Jin-hee	1	2
(Netherlands) Anousjka van Exel	6	6
(Japan) Rika Fujiwara	4	1

Qualifying competition
3	(Czech Republic) Nicole Vaidišová	6	6
(Netherlands) Anousjka van Exel	3	3

==== Fourth qualifier ====
First round
4	(Brazil) Maria Fernanda Alves	7	7
(United States) Tiffany Dabek	5	6^{6}
(Germany) Angelika Bachmann	6	6
(Japan) Ayami Takase	3	0
(Chinese Taipei) Janet Lee	1	1
(Bulgaria) Sessil Karatantcheva	6	6
WC	(Canada) Aleksandra Wozniak	3	5
6	(China) Xie Yan-ze	6	7

Second round
4	(Brazil) Maria Fernanda Alves	6	2	5
(Germany) Angelika Bachmann	4	6	7
(Bulgaria) Sessil Karatantcheva	4	6	6
6	(China) Xie Yan-ze	6	1	1

Qualifying competition
(Germany) Angelika Bachmann	7	3	0
(Bulgaria) Sessil Karatantcheva	6^{6}	6	6
