= 2004 Copa Colsanitas Seguros Bolívar – Doubles =

Doubles
- 2004 Copa Colsanitas Seguros Bolívar

Final
- Champions: (Austria) Barbara Schwartz (Germany) Jasmin Wöhr
- Runners-up: (Spain) Anabel Medina Garrigues (Spain) Arantxa Parra Santonja
- Score: 6–1, 6–3

Details
- Draw: 16
- Seeds: 4

Events
Singles	Doubles
← 2003 ·	Copa Colsanitas	· 2005 →

Katarina Srebotnik and Åsa Svensson were the defending champions, but none competed this year.

Barbara Schwartz and Jasmin Wöhr won the title by defeating Anabel Medina Garrigues and Arantxa Parra Santonja 6–1, 6–3 in the final.

== Seeds ==
1. (United States) Samantha Reeves / (Venezuela) Milagros Sequera (first round)
2. (Italy) Tathiana Garbin / (Italy) Flavia Pennetta (first round)
3. (Italy) Adriana Serra Zanetti / (Italy) Antonella Serra Zanetti (quarterfinals)
4. (Austria) Patricia Wartusch / (Colombia) Fabiola Zuluaga (first round)

== Draw ==
=== Key ===
- Q = Qualifier
- WC = Wild card
- LL = Lucky loser
- Alt = Alternate
- SE = Special exempt
- PR = Protected ranking
- ITF = ITF entry
- JE = Junior exempt
- w/o = Walkover
- r = Retired
- d = Defaulted
- SR = Special ranking

=== Draw ===
First round
1	(United States) S Reeves (Venezuela) M Sequera	4	6^{5}
(Czech Republic) E Birnerová (Slovakia) Ľ Kurhajcová	6	7^{7}
(Spain) MJ Martínez Sánchez (Spain) C Martínez Granados	6	6
Q	(Argentina) J Cravero (Argentina) N Gussoni	4	1
4	(Austria) P Wartusch (Colombia) F Zuluaga	6^{4}	3
(Spain) A Medina Garrigues (Spain) A Parra Santonja	7^{7}	6
(Spain) N Llagostera Vives (Spain) M Marrero	6	6
(Latvia) L Dekmeijere (Germany) M Müller	3	1
PR	(Austria) B Schwartz (Germany) J Wöhr	6	6
WC	(Colombia) R Farah (Colombia) V Núñez Fuentes	4	2
(Hungary) M Czink (Argentina) E Krauth	3	3
3	(Italy) Ad Serra Zanetti (Italy) An Serra Zanetti	6	6
(United States) A Harkleroad (Argentina) P Tarabini	6	6
PR	(Russia) T Panova (Russia) A Rodionova	1	4
(United States) J Ditty (Czech Republic) R Voráčová	7	5	6
2	(Italy) T Garbin (Italy) F Pennetta	5	7	3

Quarterfinals
(Czech Republic) E Birnerová (Slovakia) Ľ Kurhajcová	2	3
(Spain) MJ Martínez Sánchez (Spain) C Martínez Granados	6	6
(Spain) A Medina Garrigues (Spain) A Parra Santonja	w/o
(Spain) N Llagostera Vives (Spain) M Marrero
PR	(Austria) B Schwartz (Germany) J Wöhr	7	6
3	(Italy) Ad Serra Zanetti (Italy) An Serra Zanetti	5	0
(United States) A Harkleroad (Argentina) P Tarabini	2	4
(United States) J Ditty (Czech Republic) R Voráčová	6	6

Semifinals
(Spain) MJ Martínez Sánchez (Spain) C Martínez Granados	7	3	6^{4}
(Spain) A Medina Garrigues (Spain) A Parra Santonja	5	6	7^{7}
PR	(Austria) B Schwartz (Germany) J Wöhr	4	6	6
(United States) J Ditty (Czech Republic) R Voráčová	6	3	3

Final
(Spain) A Medina Garrigues (Spain) A Parra Santonja	1	3
PR	(Austria) B Schwartz (Germany) J Wöhr	6	6
