= 2004 Vancouver Women's Open =

- Date: 9–15 August
- Edition: 3rd
- Category: Tier V
- Draw: 32S / 16D
- Prize money: $110,000
- Surface: Hard / outdoor
- Location: Vancouver, Canada

Champions

Singles
- (Czech Republic) Nicole Vaidišová

Doubles
- (United States) Bethanie Mattek / (United States) Abigail Spears
- Vancouver Open

The 2004 Vancouver Women's Open was a women's tennis tournament played on outdoor hard courts that was part of the Tier V category of the 2004 WTA Tour. It was the third edition of the tournament and took place in Vancouver, Canada from 9 August until 15 August 2004.

Nicole Vaidišová won the singles edition, whilst the American team of Bethanie Mattek and Abigail Spears emerged victorious in the doubles category.

== Singles main-draw entrants ==
=== Seeds ===
Country	Player	Rank^{1}	Seed
FRA	Marion Bartoli	56	1
VEN	Milagros Sequera	75	2
RUS	Alina Jidkova	77	3
USA	Laura Granville	81	4
USA	Marissa Irvin	83	5
ITA	Rita Grande	85	6
GER	Anna-Lena Grönefeld	88	7
USA	Lindsay Lee-Waters	94	8

- Rankings are as of August 2, 2014.

=== Other entrants ===
The following players received wildcards into the main draw:

- (Canada) Maureen Drake
- (Canada) Marie-Ève Pelletier

The following players received entry from the qualifying draw:

- (Argentina) María Vanina García Sokol
- (Bulgaria) Sessil Karatantcheva
- (Japan) Seiko Okamoto
- (Czech Republic) Nicole Vaidišová

== Results ==
=== Singles ===
(Czech Republic) Nicole Vaidišová defeated (United States) Laura Granville, 2–6, 6–4, 6–2

- It was Vaidošová's 1st career singles title

=== Doubles ===
(United States) Bethanie Mattek / (United States) Abigail Spears defeated (Belgium) Els Callens / (Germany) Anna-Lena Grönefeld, 6–3, 6–3

- It was Mattek's first doubles title of her career, while it was the second title (and the first that season) for Spears.
