= 2005 Copa Colsanitas Seguros Bolívar – Singles =

Singles
- 2005 Copa Colsanitas Seguros Bolívar

Final
- Champion: (Italy) Flavia Pennetta
- Runner-up: (Spain) Lourdes Domínguez Lino
- Score: 7–6^{(7–4)}, 6–4

Details
- Draw: 32
- Seeds: 8

Events
Singles	Doubles
← 2004 ·	Copa Colsanitas	· 2006 →

Four-time champion Fabiola Zuluaga failed to defend her title after losing to Lourdes Domínguez Lino in the semifinals. The loss also ends Zuluaga's 17-match winning streak at her home soil.

Flavia Pennetta won the title by defeating Lourdes Domínguez Lino 7–6^{(7–4)}, 6–4 in the final.

== Seeds ==
1. (Colombia) Fabiola Zuluaga (semifinals)
2. (Italy) Flavia Pennetta (champions)
3. (France) Émilie Loit (second round)
4. (Spain) María Sánchez Lorenzo (second round)
5. (Czech Republic) Barbora Strýcová (quarterfinals)
6. (Spain) Arantxa Parra Santonja (first round)
7. (Ukraine) Tatiana Perebiynis (first round)
8. (Slovakia) Ľubomíra Kurhajcová (second round)

== Draw ==
=== Key ===
- Q = Qualifier
- WC = Wild card
- LL = Lucky loser
- Alt = Alternate
- SE = Special exempt
- PR = Protected ranking
- ITF = ITF entry
- JE = Junior exempt
- w/o = Walkover
- r = Retired
- d = Defaulted
- SR = Special ranking

=== Finals ===
Semifinals
1	(Colombia) Fabiola Zuluaga	6^{7}	6^{3}
Q	(Spain) Lourdes Domínguez Lino	7^{9}	7^{7}
WC	(Argentina) Clarisa Fernández	4	2
2	(Italy) Flavia Pennetta	6	6

Final
Q	(Spain) Lourdes Domínguez Lino	6^{4}	4
2	(Italy) Flavia Pennetta	7^{7}	6

=== Top half ===
First round
1	(Colombia) F Zuluaga	6	6
(Canada) MÈ Pelletier	1	1
(Argentina) M Díaz Oliva	6	6
WC	(Mexico) M Torres Sandoval	2	3
(Colombia) C Castaño	7^{7}	6
Q	(Canada) A Wozniak	6^{4}	3
(Brazil) MF Alves	6	7^{9}
7	(Ukraine) T Perebiynis	4	6^{7}
4	(Spain) M Sánchez Lorenzo	4	6	7
(Russia) L Skavronskaia	6	4	5
(Argentina) ME Salerni	2	4
(Czech Republic) E Birnerová	6	6
(Spain) L Pous Tió	4	1
Q	(Spain) L Domínguez Lino	6	6
(Slovakia) Ľ Cervanová	2	6^{5}
8	(Slovakia) Ľ Kurhajcová	6	7^{7}

Second round
1	(Colombia) F Zuluaga	6	6
(Argentina) M Díaz Oliva	2	1
(Colombia) C Castaño	6	6
(Brazil) MF Alves	2	4
4	(Spain) M Sánchez Lorenzo	4	6^{6}
(Czech Republic) E Birnerová	6	7^{8}
Q	(Spain) L Domínguez Lino	6	6
8	(Slovakia) Ľ Kurhajcová	4	3

Quarterfinals
1	(Colombia) F Zuluaga	6	6
(Colombia) C Castaño	2	1
(Czech Republic) E Birnerová	3	6^{4}
Q	(Spain) L Domínguez Lino	6	7^{7}

Semifinals
1	(Colombia) F Zuluaga	6^{7}	6^{3}
Q	(Spain) L Domínguez Lino	7^{9}	7^{7}

=== Bottom half ===
First round
6	(Spain) A Parra Santonja	2	2
(Spain) C Martínez Granados	6	6
(Switzerland) E Gagliardi	6	6
(Slovenia) T Pisnik	3	4
WC	(Argentina) C Fernández	7^{7}	6
(Spain) P García	6^{3}	2
(Hungary) M Czink	4	1
3	(France) É Loit	6	6
5	(Czech Republic) B Strýcová	7^{7}	6
Q	(Argentina) V García Sokol	6^{5}	1
(Hungary) Z Gubacsi	6	7
(Puerto Rico) V Castellvi	4	5
(Morocco) B Mouhtassine	5	3
Q	(Hungary) Á Szávay	7	6
LL	(Portugal) F Piedade	2	1
2	(Italy) F Pennetta	6	6

Second round
(Spain) C Martínez Granados	1	4
(Switzerland) E Gagliardi	6	6
WC	(Argentina) C Fernández	7^{7}	7
3	(France) É Loit	6^{1}	5
5	(Czech Republic) B Strýcová	6	6
(Hungary) Z Gubacsi	3	0
Q	(Hungary) Á Szávay	3	2
2	(Italy) F Pennetta	6	6

Quarterfinals
(Switzerland) E Gagliardi	4	4
WC	(Argentina) C Fernández	6	6
5	(Czech Republic) B Strýcová	2	1
2	(Italy) F Pennetta	6	6

Semifinals
WC	(Argentina) C Fernández	4	2
2	(Italy) F Pennetta	6	6
