= 2008 Copa Colsanitas – Singles =

Singles
- 2008 Copa Colsanitas

Final
- Champion: (Spain) Nuria Llagostera Vives
- Runner-up: (Argentina) María Emilia Salerni
- Score: 6–0, 6–4

Details
- Draw: 32
- Seeds: 8

Events
| Singles | Doubles |
| ← 2007 · | Copa Colsanitas | · 2009 → |

Roberta Vinci was the defending champion, but chose not to participate that year.

Nuria Llagostera Vives won in the final 6–0, 6–4, against María Emilia Salerni.

== Seeds ==
1. (Italy) Flavia Pennetta (first round)
2. (France) Alizé Cornet (first round)
3. (France) Pauline Parmentier (second round)
4. (France) Émilie Loit (first round)
5. (Austria) Yvonne Meusburger (second round)
6. (Italy) Sara Errani (quarterfinals)
7. (Romania) Edina Gallovits (second round)
8. (Czech Republic) Klára Zakopalová (withdrew due to a left ankle injury)
9. (Germany) Martina Müller (quarterfinals)

== Draw ==
=== Key ===
- Q = Qualifier
- WC = Wild card
- LL = Lucky loser
- Alt = Alternate
- SE = Special exempt
- PR = Protected ranking
- ITF = ITF entry
- JE = Junior exempt
- w/o = Walkover
- r = Retired
- d = Defaulted
- SR = Special ranking

=== Finals ===
Semifinals
Q | (Argentina) Betina Jozami | 2 | 2
Q | (Spain) Nuria Llagostera Vives | 6 | 6
Q | (Spain) Carla Suárez Navarro | 6 | 6^{3} | 3
(Argentina) María Emilia Salerni | 3 | 7 | 6

Final
Q | (Spain) Nuria Llagostera Vives | 6 | 6
(Argentina) María Emilia Salerni | 0 | 4

=== Top half ===
First round
1 | (Italy) F Pennetta | 1 | 6 | 4
Q | (Argentina) B Jozami | 6 | 2 | 6
(Ukraine) M Koryttseva | 6 | 4 | 7
(Czech Republic) P Cetkovská | 1 | 6 | 6^{3}
(Romania) S Cîrstea | 2 | 6 | 6
(France) C Pin | 6 | 2 | 4
WC | (Colombia) V Núñez Fuentes | 5 | 6^{5}
9 | (Germany) M Müller | 7 | 7
4 | (France) É Loit | 5 | 3
LL | (Paraguay) R de los Ríos | 7 | 6
Q | (Spain) N Llagostera Vives | 6 | 6
(Germany) T Malek | 4 | 2
Q | (Argentina) M Irigoyen | 4 | 0
(Spain) L Domínguez Lino | 6 | 6
(Russia) E Bychkova | 1 | 1
6 | (Italy) S Errani | 6 | 6

Second round
Q | (Argentina) B Jozami | w/o
(Ukraine) M Koryttseva
(Romania) S Cîrstea | 2 | 2
9 | (Germany) M Müller | 6 | 6
LL | (Paraguay) R de los Ríos | 2 | 0
Q | (Spain) N Llagostera Vives | 6 | 6
(Spain) L Domínguez Lino | 0 | 3
6 | (Italy) S Errani | 6 | 6

Quarterfinals
Q | (Argentina) B Jozami | 6 | 6
9 | (Germany) M Müller | 3 | 1
Q | (Spain) N Llagostera Vives | 7 | 6
6 | (Italy) S Errani | 5 | 1

Semifinals
Q | (Argentina) B Jozami | 2 | 2
Q | (Spain) N Llagostera Vives | 6 | 6

=== Bottom half ===
First round
7 | (Romania) E Gallovits | 6 | 6
(United States) S Rao | 1 | 2
(United States) B Mattek | 5 | 2
Q | (Spain) C Suárez Navarro | 7 | 6
(Estonia) K Kanepi | 3 | 5
WC | (Colombia) C Castaño | 6 | 7
(Germany) J Schruff | 4 | 3
3 | (France) P Parmentier | 6 | 6
5 | (Austria) Y Meusburger | 6 | 6
(United States) J Craybas | 4 | 4
WC | (Colombia) M Duque Mariño | 6 | 3
(Croatia) J Kostanić Tošić | 4 | 1 | r
(Estonia) M Ani | 6 | 3 | 2
(Italy) ME Camerin | 4 | 6 | 6
(Argentina) ME Salerni | 6 | 6
2 | (France) A Cornet | 4 | 2

Second round
7 | (Romania) E Gallovits | 4 | 3
Q | (Spain) C Suárez Navarro | 6 | 6
WC | (Colombia) C Castaño | 3 | 6 | 6
3 | (France) P Parmentier | 6 | 4 | 4
5 | (Austria) Y Meusburger | 1 | 2
WC | (Colombia) M Duque Mariño | 6 | 6
(Italy) ME Camerin | 6 | 2 | 3
(Argentina) ME Salerni | 4 | 6 | 6

Quarterfinals
Q | (Spain) C Suárez Navarro | 7 | 6
WC | (Colombia) C Castaño | 6^{2} | 4
WC | (Colombia) M Duque Mariño | 3 | 6 | 4
(Argentina) ME Salerni | 6 | 4 | 6

Semifinals
Q | (Spain) C Suárez Navarro | 6 | 6^{3} | 3
(Argentina) ME Salerni | 3 | 7 | 6
