= 2008 Copa Colsanitas – Doubles =

Doubles
- 2008 Copa Colsanitas

Final
- Champions: (Czech Republic) Iveta Benešová (United States) Bethanie Mattek
- Runners-up: (Croatia) Jelena Kostanić Tošić (Germany) Martina Müller
- Score: 6–3, 6–3

Details
- Draw: 16
- Seeds: 4

Events
Singles	Doubles
← 2007 ·	Copa Colsanitas	· 2009 →

Lourdes Domínguez Lino and Paola Suárez were the defending champions, but Suárez retired from the sport on September 1, 2007, and only Domínguez Lino competed that year. She partnered with Arantxa Parra Santonja, but lost in the semifinals to Iveta Benešová and Bethanie Mattek.

Iveta Benešová and Bethanie Mattek won in the final 6–3, 6–3, against Jelena Kostanić Tošić and Martina Müller.

== Seeds ==
1. (Czech Republic) Iveta Benešová / (United States) Bethanie Mattek (champions)
2. (Italy) Maria Elena Camerin / (Italy) Flavia Pennetta (quarterfinals)
3. (Spain) Lourdes Domínguez Lino / (Spain) Arantxa Parra Santonja (semifinals)
4. (Croatia) Jelena Kostanić Tošić / (Germany) Martina Müller (final)

== Draw ==
=== Key ===
- Q = Qualifier
- WC = Wild card
- LL = Lucky loser
- Alt = Alternate
- SE = Special exempt
- PR = Protected ranking
- ITF = ITF entry
- JE = Junior exempt
- w/o = Walkover
- r = Retired
- d = Defaulted
- SR = Special ranking

=== Draw ===
First round
1	(Czech Republic) I Benešová (United States) B Mattek	6	6
(Poland) K Jans (Turkey) İ Şenoğlu	4	2
(Brazil) MF Alves (Czech Republic) A Hlaváčková	6	4	[8]
(Argentina) B Jozami (United States) S Rao	0	6	[10]
3	(Spain) L Domínguez Lino (Spain) A Parra Santonja	6	6
(France) S Lefèvre (Romania) A Szatmári	2	2
(Czech Republic) P Cetkovská (Estonia) M Ani	2	6^{8}
(Spain) MJ Martínez Sánchez (Spain) N Llagostera Vives	6	7
(Germany) T Malek (Poland) A Rosolska	7	3	[10]
WC	(Colombia) C Castaño (Colombia) M Duque Mariño	6^{9}	6	[8]
(Argentina) J Cravero (France) C Pin	2	5
4	(Croatia) J Kostanić Tošić (Germany) M Müller	6	7
(United States) C Fusano (United States) R Kops-Jones	6	4	[5]
(Italy) S Errani (Portugal) F Piedade	2	6	[10]
(Spain) M Marrero (Spain) C Suárez Navarro	1	1
2	(Italy) ME Camerin (Italy) F Pennetta	6	6

Quarterfinals
1	(Czech Republic) I Benešová (United States) B Mattek	6	3	[10]
(Argentina) B Jozami (United States) S Rao	2	6	[7]
3	(Spain) L Domínguez Lino (Spain) A Parra Santonja	6	6
(Spain) MJ Martínez Sánchez (Spain) N Llagostera Vives	4	3
(Germany) T Malek (Poland) A Rosolska	3	2
4	(Croatia) J Kostanić Tošić (Germany) M Müller	6	6
(Italy) S Errani (Portugal) F Piedade	6	6^{7}	[10]
2	(Italy) ME Camerin (Italy) F Pennetta	3	7	[8]

Semifinals
1	(Czech Republic) I Benešová (United States) B Mattek	6	1	[10]
3	(Spain) L Domínguez Lino (Spain) A Parra Santonja	4	6	[8]
4	(Croatia) J Kostanić Tošić (Germany) M Müller	4	6	[10]
(Italy) S Errani (Portugal) F Piedade	6	4	[8]

Final
1	(Czech Republic) I Benešová (United States) B Mattek	6	6
4	(Croatia) J Kostanić Tošić (Germany) M Müller	3	3
