= 2007 Copa Colsanitas Santander – Doubles =

Doubles
- 2007 Copa Colsanitas Santander

Final
- Champion: (Spain) Lourdes Domínguez Lino (Argentina) Paola Suárez
- Runner-up: (Italy) Flavia Pennetta (Italy) Roberta Vinci
- Score: 1–6, 6–3, [11–9]

Details
- Draw: 16
- Seeds: 4

Events
Singles	Doubles
← 2006 ·	Copa Colsanitas	· 2008 →

Gisela Dulko and Flavia Pennetta were the defending champions, but Dulko chose not to participate that year.

Pennetta partnering Roberta Vinci lost in the final.

== Seeds ==
1. (Spain) Lourdes Domínguez Lino / (Argentina) Paola Suárez (champions)
2. (Italy) Flavia Pennetta / (Italy) Roberta Vinci (final)
3. (Italy) Tathiana Garbin / (France) Émilie Loit (semifinals)
4. (Argentina) María José Argeri / (Brazil) Letícia Sobral (first round)

== Draw ==
=== Key ===
- Q = Qualifier
- WC = Wild card
- LL = Lucky loser
- Alt = Alternate
- SE = Special exempt
- PR = Protected ranking
- ITF = ITF entry
- JE = Junior exempt
- w/o = Walkover
- r = Retired
- d = Defaulted
- SR = Special ranking

=== Draw ===
First round
1	(Spain) L Domínguez Lino (Argentina) P Suárez	6	6
(Italy) S Disderi (Portugal) F Piedade	4	1
(Germany) T Malek (Czech Republic) B Záhlavová-Strýcová	7^{7}	6
(Brazil) J Cortez (Argentina) J Cravero	6^{6}	2
4	(Argentina) MJ Argeri (Brazil) L Sobral	5	4
(Spain) N Llagostera Vives (Spain) M Marrero	7	6
(Hungary) Z Gubacsi (Hungary) K Nagy	6	2
(New Zealand) L Baker (Australia) N Kriz	7	6
WC	(Colombia) M Duque (Colombia) V Núñez Fuentes	3	6^{2}
(Spain) C Martínez Granados (Spain) A Parra Santonja	6	7^{7}
(Czech Republic) H Šromová (Czech Republic) S Záhlavová	3	1
3	(Italy) T Garbin (France) É Loit	6	6
(Italy) S Errani (Italy) G Gabba	6	2	[9]
(Croatia) I Abramović (United States) J Ditty	2	6	[10]
(Brazil) L Carvalho (Brazil) J Widjaja	6^{5}	2
2	(Italy) F Pennetta (Italy) R Vinci	7^{7}	6

Quarterfinals
1	(Spain) L Domínguez Lino (Argentina) P Suárez	4	6	[10]
(Germany) T Malek (Czech Republic) B Záhlavová-Strýcová	6	4	[6]
(Spain) N Llagostera Vives (Spain) M Marrero	6	7^{7}
(New Zealand) L Baker (Australia) N Kriz	2	6^{5}
(Spain) C Martínez Granados (Spain) A Parra Santonja	4	5
3	(Italy) T Garbin (France) É Loit	6	7
(Croatia) I Abramović (United States) J Ditty	1	2
(Italy) F Pennetta (Italy) R Vinci	6	6

Semifinals
1	(Spain) L Domínguez Lino (Argentina) P Suárez	6	6
(Spain) N Llagostera Vives (Spain) M Marrero	2	1
3	(Italy) T Garbin (France) É Loit	6^{9}	2
2	(Italy) F Pennetta (Italy) R Vinci	7^{11}	6

Final
1	(Spain) L Domínguez Lino (Argentina) P Suárez	1	6	[11]
2	(Italy) F Pennetta (Italy) R Vinci	6	3	[9]
