= 2003 Copa Colsanitas – Singles =

Women's tennis competition

Singles
- 2003 Copa Colsanitas

Final
- Champion: (Colombia) Fabiola Zuluaga
- Runner-up: (Spain) Anabel Medina Garrigues
- Score: 6–3, 6–2

Details
- Draw: 30
- Seeds: 8

Events
Singles	Doubles
← 2002 ·	Copa Colsanitas	· 2004 →

Fabiola Zuluaga was the defending champion and successfully defended her title, by defeating Anabel Medina Garrigues 6–3, 6–2 in the final.

== Seeds ==
The first two seeds received a bye into the second round.

1. (Argentina) Paola Suárez (semifinals)
2. (Slovenia) Katarina Srebotnik (semifinals)
3. (Spain) Cristina Torrens Valero (first round)
4. (Colombia) Fabiola Zuluaga (champion)
5. (Italy) Flavia Pennetta (quarterfinals)
6. (Spain) Conchita Martínez Granados (quarterfinals)
7. (Sweden) Åsa Svensson (second round)
8. (Germany) Marlene Weingärtner (first round)

== Draw ==
=== Key ===
- Q = Qualifier
- WC = Wild card
- LL = Lucky loser
- Alt = Alternate
- SE = Special exempt
- PR = Protected ranking
- ITF = ITF entry
- JE = Junior exempt
- w/o = Walkover
- r = Retired
- d = Defaulted
- SR = Special ranking

=== Finals ===
Semifinals
1	(Argentina) Paola Suárez	0	7	3
4	(Colombia) Fabiola Zuluaga	6	5	6
(Spain) Anabel Medina Garrigues	7	6
2	(Slovenia) Katarina Srebotnik	5	3

Final
4	(Colombia) Fabiola Zuluaga	6	6
(Spain) Anabel Medina Garrigues	3	2

=== Top half ===
First round
(Spain) N Llagostera Vives	6	6
(Venezuela) M Sequera	3	4
(Russia) O Kalyuzhnaya	6	6
(Spain) P García	2	2
Q	(Uruguay) AL Migliarini de León	1	3
6	(Spain) C Martínez Granados	6	6
4	(Colombia) F Zuluaga	6	6
(United States) S Reeves	1	1
(Argentina) G Dulko	7	6
WC	(Spain) L Domínguez Lino	5	2
(Hungary) K Marosi	6	6
Q	(Canada) M Marois	1	4
(Argentina) M Díaz Oliva	4	4
7	(Sweden) Å Svensson	6	6

Second round
1	(Argentina) P Suárez	4	6	6
(Spain) N Llagostera Vives	6	1	2
(Russia) O Kalyuzhnaya	6	4	6^{1}
6	(Spain) C Martínez Granados	4	6	7^{7}
4	(Colombia) F Zuluaga	6	6
(Argentina) G Dulko	1	4
(Hungary) K Marosi	6	6
7	(Sweden) Å Svensson	1	2

Quarterfinals
1	(Argentina) P Suárez	6	6
6	(Spain) C Martínez Granados	2	4
4	(Colombia) F Zuluaga	6	6
(Hungary) K Marosi	1	2

Semifinals
1	(Argentina) P Suárez	0	7	3
4	(Colombia) F Zuluaga	6	5	6

=== Bottom half ===
First round
8	(Germany) M Weingärtner	1	6	3
(Russia) A Rodionova	6	3	6
Q	(Ukraine) K Bondarenko	6^{6}	3
(Colombia) C Castaño	7^{8}	6
(Spain) A Medina Garrigues	6	6
(Argentina) ME Salerni	3	2
Q	(Croatia) I Abramović	7	2	6
3	(Spain) C Torrens Valero	5	6	3
5	(Italy) F Pennetta	6	6
(Ukraine) A Bondarenko	3	1
(Ukraine) T Perebiynis	6	6^{2}	4
(United States) A Cargill	3	7^{7}	6
WC	(Colombia) R Farah	6	1	0
(Germany) J Kandarr	3	6	6

Second round
(Russia) A Rodionova	3	6	6^{4}
(Colombia) C Castaño	6	3	7^{7}
(Spain) A Medina Garrigues	5	7^{7}	6
Q	(Croatia) I Abramović	7	6^{3}	4
5	(Italy) F Pennetta	6	6
(United States) A Cargill	3	4
(Germany) J Kandarr	2	7^{7}	6^{5}
2	(Slovenia) K Srebotnik	6	6^{3}	7^{7}

Quarterfinals
(Colombia) C Castaño	2	6^{10}
(Spain) A Medina Garrigues	6	7^{12}
5	(Italy) F Pennetta	4	5
2	(Slovenia) K Srebotnik	6	7

Semifinals
(Spain) A Medina Garrigues	7	6
2	(Slovenia) K Srebotnik	5	3
