= 2008 Copa Colsanitas =

- Date: 18–24 February
- Edition: 11th
- Category: Tier III Series
- Draw: 32S / 16D
- Prize money: $185,000
- Surface: Clay / outdoor
- Location: Bogotá, Colombia

Champions

Singles
- (Spain) Nuria Llagostera Vives

Doubles
- (Czech Republic) Iveta Benešová / (United States) Bethanie Mattek
← 2007 ·	Copa Colsanitas	· 2009 →

The 2008 Copa Colsanitas was a women's tennis tournament played on outdoor clay courts. It was the 11th edition of the Copa Colsanitas, and was part of the Tier III Series of the 2008 WTA Tour. It took place at the Club Campestre El Rancho in Bogotá, Colombia, from 18 to 24 February. Qualifier Nuria Llagostera Vives won the singles title and earned $29,000 first-prize money.

== Finals ==
=== Singles ===
(Spain) Nuria Llagostera Vives defeated (Argentina) María Emilia Salerni, 6–0, 6–4

- It was Llagostera's 1st title of the year, and her 2nd overall.

=== Doubles ===
(Czech Republic) Iveta Benešová / (United States) Bethanie Mattek defeated (Croatia) Jelena Kostanić Tošić / (Germany) Martina Müller, 6–3, 6–3
