= 2007 Copa Colsanitas Santander – Singles =

Singles
- 2007 Copa Colsanitas Santander

Final
- Champion: (Italy) Roberta Vinci
- Runner-up: (Italy) Tathiana Garbin
- Score: 6–7^{(5–7)}, 6–4, 0–3 ret.

Details
- Draw: 32
- Seeds: 8

Events
Singles	Doubles
← 2006 ·	Copa Colsanitas	· 2008 →

Lourdes Domínguez Lino was the defending champion, but lost in the semifinals to Tathiana Garbin.

== Seeds ==
1. (Italy) Tathiana Garbin (final)
2. (Italy) Flavia Pennetta (semifinals)
3. (Spain) Lourdes Domínguez Lino (semifinals)
4. (France) Émilie Loit (quarterfinals)
5. (Belarus) Anastasiya Yakimova (first round)
6. (Italy) Roberta Vinci (champion)
7. (Czech Republic) Klára Zakopalová (quarterfinals)
8. (Czech Republic) Hana Šromová (second round)

== Draw ==
=== Key ===
- Q = Qualifier
- WC = Wild card
- LL = Lucky loser
- Alt = Alternate
- SE = Special exempt
- PR = Protected ranking
- ITF = ITF entry
- JE = Junior exempt
- w/o = Walkover
- r = Retired
- d = Defaulted
- SR = Special ranking

=== Finals ===
Semifinals
1	(Italy) Tathiana Garbin	6	6
(Spain) Lourdes Domínguez Lino	3	1
6	(Italy) Roberta Vinci	3	7	6
2	(Italy) Flavia Pennetta	6	6^{2}	2

Final
1	(Italy) Tathiana Garbin	7	4	3r
6	(Italy) Roberta Vinci	6^{4}	6	0

=== Top half ===
First round
1	(Italy) T Garbin	6	6
(Germany) K Wörle	4	4
Q	(Georgia (country)) A Tatishvili	5	6	2
(Argentina) J Cravero	7	4	6
(Czech Republic) B Záhlavová-Strýcová	6	6
(Spain) M Marrero	2	2
Q	(Spain) E Cabeza Candela	1	2
8	(Czech Republic) H Šromová	6	6
3	(Spain) L Domínguez Lino	4	6	6
(Italy) S Errani	6	1	3
Q	(Germany) G Arn	6	6^{4}	6
(United States) J Ditty	3	7	3
(France) P Parmentier	6	7
(Croatia) I Abramović	3	6^{5}
WC	(Spain) N Llagostera Vives	2	3
7	(Czech Republic) K Zakopalová	6	6

Second round
1	(Italy) T Garbin	6	6
(Argentina) J Cravero	3	0
(Czech Republic) B Záhlavová-Strýcová	6	6
8	(Czech Republic) H Šromová	4	3
3	(Spain) L Domínguez Lino	6	6
Q	(Germany) G Arn	4	3
(France) P Parmentier	2	3
7	(Czech Republic) K Zakopalová	6	6

Quarterfinals
1	(Italy) T Garbin	6	7
(Czech Republic) B Záhlavová-Strýcová	2	5
3	(Spain) L Domínguez Lino	4	6	6
7	(Czech Republic) K Zakopalová	6	3	3

Semifinals
1	(Italy) T Garbin	6	6
3	(Spain) L Domínguez Lino	3	1

=== Bottom half ===
First round
6	(Italy) R Vinci	3	7	6
(Czech Republic) K Böhmová	6	6^{4}	2
Q	(France) A Cornet	6	6
(Hungary) K Nagy	2	3
(Hungary) Z Gubacsi	0	3
(Argentina) P Suárez	6	6
(Spain) A Parra Santonja	2	1
4	(France) É Loit	6	6
5	(Belarus) A Yakimova	2	4
(Italy) N Viérin	6	6
(Czech Republic) S Záhlavová	6	5	4
(Spain) C Martínez Granados	3	7	6
WC	(Colombia) V Núñez Fuentes	2	3
WC	(Colombia) M Duque Mariño	6	6
(Germany) T Malek	4	6	3
2	(Italy) F Pennetta	6	2	6

Second round
6	(Italy) R Vinci	6	6
Q	(France) A Cornet	2	3
(Argentina) P Suárez	4	6	3
4	(France) É Loit	6	4	6
(Italy) N Viérin	6	6
(Spain) C Martínez Granados	2	2
WC	(Colombia) M Duque Mariño	6^{7}	2
2	(Italy) F Pennetta	7	6

Quarterfinals
6	(Italy) R Vinci	6	4	6
4	(France) É Loit	3	6	2
(Italy) N Viérin	2	2	r
2	(Italy) F Pennetta	6	4

Semifinals
6	(Italy) R Vinci	3	7	6
2	(Italy) F Pennetta	6	6^{2}	2
