= 2006 Copa Colsanitas Seguros Bolívar – Doubles =

Doubles
- 2006 Copa Colsanitas Seguros Bolívar

Final
- Champions: (Argentina) Gisela Dulko (Italy) Flavia Pennetta
- Runners-up: (Hungary) Ágnes Szávay (Germany) Jasmin Wöhr
- Score: 7–6^{(7–1)}, 6–1

Details
- Draw: 16
- Seeds: 4

Events
Singles	Doubles
← 2005 ·	Copa Colsanitas	· 2007 →

Emmanuelle Gagliardi and Tina Pisnik were the defending champions, but Pisnik did not compete this year. Gagliardi teamed up with Mariana Díaz Oliva and lost in first round to María José Argeri and Letícia Sobral.

Gisela Dulko and Flavia Pennetta won the title by defeating Ágnes Szávay and Jasmin Wöhr 7–6^{(7–1)}, 6–1 in the final.

== Seeds ==
1. (Argentina) Gisela Dulko / (Italy) Flavia Pennetta (champions)
2. (Hungary) Ágnes Szávay / (Germany) Jasmin Wöhr (final)
3. (Czech Republic) Eva Birnerová / (Czech Republic) Gabriela Navrátilová (quarterfinals)
4. (Spain) Lourdes Domínguez Lino / (Spain) María Sánchez Lorenzo (semifinals)

== Draw ==
=== Key ===
- Q = Qualifier
- WC = Wild card
- LL = Lucky loser
- Alt = Alternate
- SE = Special exempt
- PR = Protected ranking
- ITF = ITF entry
- JE = Junior exempt
- w/o = Walkover
- r = Retired
- d = Defaulted
- SR = Special ranking

=== Draw ===
First round
1	(Argentina) G Dulko (Italy) F Pennetta	6	6
(Colombia) C Castaño (Italy) V Sassi	4	0
(Spain) A Parra Santonja (Italy) An Serra Zanetti	6	6
(Italy) S Errani (Spain) P García	4	2
4	(Spain) L Domínguez Lino (Spain) M Sánchez Lorenzo	6	4	6
(Croatia) I Abramović (Hungary) Z Gubacsi	3	6	2
(Argentina) MJ Argeri (Brazil) L Sobral	6	3	6
(Argentina) M Díaz Oliva (Switzerland) E Gagliardi	2	6	4
(Spain) C Martínez Granados (Spain) MJ Martínez Sánchez	6	6^{6}	6
(Spain) L Pous Tió (Belarus) A Yakimova	4	7^{8}	1
Q	(Argentina) A Benítez (Argentina) B Jozami	3	6	2
3	(Czech Republic) E Birnerová (Czech Republic) G Navrátilová	6	4	6
(United States) B Mattek (Czech Republic) K Böhmová	6	3	6
WC	(Argentina) N Gussoni (Mexico) D Múñoz Gallegos	2	6	4
(Brazil) MF Alves (United States) N Uberoi	7^{7}	2	2
2	(Hungary) Á Szávay (Germany) J Wöhr	6^{3}	6	6

Quarterfinals
1	(Argentina) G Dulko (Italy) F Pennetta	2	7	6
(Spain) A Parra Santonja (Italy) An Serra Zanetti	6	5	1
4	(Spain) L Domínguez Lino (Spain) M Sánchez Lorenzo	6	4	6
(Argentina) MJ Argeri (Brazil) L Sobral	3	6	3
(Spain) C Martínez Granados (Spain) MJ Martínez Sánchez	6	6
3	(Czech Republic) E Birnerová (Czech Republic) G Navrátilová	3	1
(United States) B Mattek (Czech Republic) K Böhmová	4	2
2	(Hungary) Á Szávay (Germany) J Wöhr	6	6

Semifinals
1	(Argentina) G Dulko (Italy) F Pennetta	6	6
4	(Spain) L Domínguez Lino (Spain) M Sánchez Lorenzo	4	1
(Spain) C Martínez Granados (Spain) MJ Martínez Sánchez	3	2
2	(Hungary) Á Szávay (Germany) J Wöhr	6	6

Final
1	(Argentina) G Dulko (Italy) F Pennetta	7^{7}	6
2	(Hungary) Á Szávay (Germany) J Wöhr	6^{1}	1
