= 2003 Copa Colsanitas =

- Date: 17–23 February
- Edition: 6th
- Category: Tier III
- Draw: 30S / 16D
- Prize money: $170,000
- Surface: Clay / outdoor
- Location: Bogotá, Colombia

Champions

Singles
- (Colombia) Fabiola Zuluaga

Doubles
- (Slovenia) Katarina Srebotnik / (Sweden) Åsa Svensson
- Copa Colsanitas

The 2003 Copa Colsanitas was a women's tennis tournament played on outdoor clay courts at the Club Campestre El Rancho in Bogotá, Colombia that was part of Tier III of the 2003 WTA Tour. It was the sixth edition of the Copa Colsanitas and ran from 17 to 23 February 2003. Fourth-seeded and defending champion Fabiola Zuluaga won the singles title and earned $27,000 first-prize money.

== Finals ==
=== Singles ===
(Colombia) Fabiola Zuluaga defeated (Spain) Anabel Medina Garrigues 6–3, 6–2

- It was Zuluaga's 1st singles title of the year and the 5th of her career.

=== Doubles ===
(Slovenia) Katarina Srebotnik / (Sweden) Åsa Svensson defeated (Slovenia) Tina Križan / (Ukraine) Tatiana Perebiynis 6–2, 6–1
