= 2006 Copa Colsanitas Seguros Bolívar =

2006 Copa Colsanitas Seguros Bolivar
- Date: 20–26 February
- Edition: 9th
- Category: Tier III
- Draw: 32S / 16D
- Prize money: $175,000
- Surface: Clay / outdoor
- Location: Bogotá, Colombia

Champions

Singles
- (Spain) Lourdes Domínguez Lino

Doubles
- (Argentina) Gisela Dulko / (Italy) Flavia Pennetta
- Copa Colsanitas

The 2006 Copa Colsanitas Seguros Bolivar was a women's tennis tournament played on outdoor clay courts at the Club Campestre El Rancho in Bogotá, Colombia that was part of Tier III of the 2006 WTA Tour. It was the ninth edition of the tournament and ran from 20 to 26 February. Sixth-seeded Lourdes Domínguez Lino won the singles title and earned $28,000 first-prize money.

== Finals ==
=== Singles ===
(Spain) Lourdes Domínguez Lino defeated (Italy) Flavia Pennetta 7–6^{(7–3)}, 6–4

- It was Domínguez Lino's first singles title of her career.

=== Doubles ===
(Argentina) Gisela Dulko / (Italy) Flavia Pennetta defeated (Hungary) Ágnes Szávay / (Germany) Jasmin Wöhr 7–6^{(7–1)}, 6–1
