= 2009 Copa Sony Ericsson Colsanitas – Singles =

Singles
- 2009 Copa Sony Ericsson Colsanitas

Final
- Champions: (Spain) María José Martínez Sánchez
- Runners-up: (Argentina) Gisela Dulko
- Score: 6–3, 6–2

Details
- Draw: 32
- Seeds: 8

Events
Singles	Doubles
- Copa Colsanitas

Nuria Llagostera Vives was the defending champion, but lost in the second round to Patricia Mayr. Seventh-seeded María José Martínez Sánchez won the singles title.

== Seeds ==
1. (Italy) Flavia Pennetta (first round)
2. (Spain) Carla Suárez Navarro (second round)
3. (Argentina) Gisela Dulko (final)
4. (Spain) Nuria Llagostera Vives (second round)
5. (Czech Republic) Klára Zakopalová (second round)
6. (France) Mathilde Johansson (quarterfinals)
7. (Spain) María José Martínez Sánchez (champion)
8. (Spain) Lourdes Domínguez Lino (first round)

== Draw ==
Key

- Q = Qualifier
- WC = Wild card
- LL = Lucky loser
- Alt = Alternate
- ITF = ITF entry
- PR = Protected ranking
- SR = Special ranking
- SE = Special exempt
- JE = Junior exempt
- JR = Junior Accelerator Programme entrant
- CO = College Accelerator Programme entrant
- NG = Next Gen Accelerator Program entrant
- w/o = Walkover
- r = Retired
- d = Defaulted

=== Finals ===
Semifinals
(Romania) Edina Gallovits	2	3
3	(Argentina) Gisela Dulko	6	6
(Austria) Patricia Mayr	5	5
7	(Spain) María José Martínez Sánchez	7	7

Final
3	(Argentina) Gisela Dulko	3	2
7	(Spain) María José Martínez Sánchez	6	6

=== Top half ===
First round
1	(Italy) F Pennetta	3	6	6^{4}
(Slovenia) M Zec Peškirič	6	4	7
(Czech Republic) S Záhlavová	5	2
(Czech Republic) P Cetkovská	7	6
(Czech Republic) B Záhlavová-Strýcová	2	2
(Romania) E Gallovits	6	6
(Italy) R Oprandi	6	6^{7}	6^{5}
5	(Czech Republic) K Zakopalová	3	7	7
3	(Argentina) G Dulko	6	6
Q	(Belgium) T Hendler	2	4
(Paraguay) R de los Ríos	4	6	1
(France) O Sanchez	6	0	0^{r}
Q	(Hungary) K Marosi	7	3	7
(Hungary) G Arn	5	6	5
(Colombia) C Castaño	7	4	4
6	(France) M Johansson	6^{2}	6	6

Second round
(Slovenia) M Zec Peškirič	6	6
(Czech Republic) P Cetkovská	4	3
(Romania) E Gallovits	6	6
5	(Czech Republic) K Zakopalová	3	4
3	(Argentina) G Dulko	5	6	6
(Paraguay) R de los Ríos	7	1	3
Q	(Hungary) K Marosi	4	1
6	(France) M Johansson	6	6

Quarterfinals
(Slovenia) M Zec Peškirič	3	0
(Romania) E Gallovits	6	6
3	(Argentina) G Dulko	6	6
6	(France) M Johansson	1	2

Semifinals
(Romania) E Gallovits	2	3
3	(Argentina) G Dulko	6	6

=== Bottom half ===
First round
8	(Spain) L Domínguez Lino	7	4	6^{3}
(Romania) IR Olaru	5	6	7
WC	(Argentina) ME Salerni	7	2	5
(Estonia) M Ani	5	6	7
(Austria) P Mayr	6	6
Q	(Israel) T Obziler	2	3
(Ukraine) O Savchuk	2	0
4	(Spain) N Llagostera Vives	6	6
7	(Spain) MJ Martínez Sánchez	6	6
(Belarus) A Yakimova	1	3
WC	(Spain) A Parra Santonja	6	6
WC	(Colombia) V Núñez Fuentes	2	1
(Colombia) M Duque Marino	7	0	1
(Argentina) B Jozami	5	6	6
Q	(Sweden) J Larsson	6^{4}	4
2	(Spain) C Suárez Navarro	7	6

Second round
(Romania) IR Olaru	6	6
(Estonia) M Ani	4	2
(Austria) P Mayr	7	6
4	(Spain) N Llagostera Vives	6^{8}	3
7	(Spain) MJ Martínez Sánchez	6	6
WC	(Spain) A Parra Santonja	4	3
(Argentina) B Jozami	4
2	(Spain) C Suárez Navarro	0	r

Quarterfinals
(Romania) IR Olaru	1	2
(Austria) P Mayr	6	6
7	(Spain) MJ Martínez Sánchez	6	6^{8}	6
(Argentina) B Jozami	3	7	4

Semifinals
(Austria) P Mayr	5	5
7	(Spain) MJ Martínez Sánchez	7	7
