= Megan Falcon =

American tennis coach and player

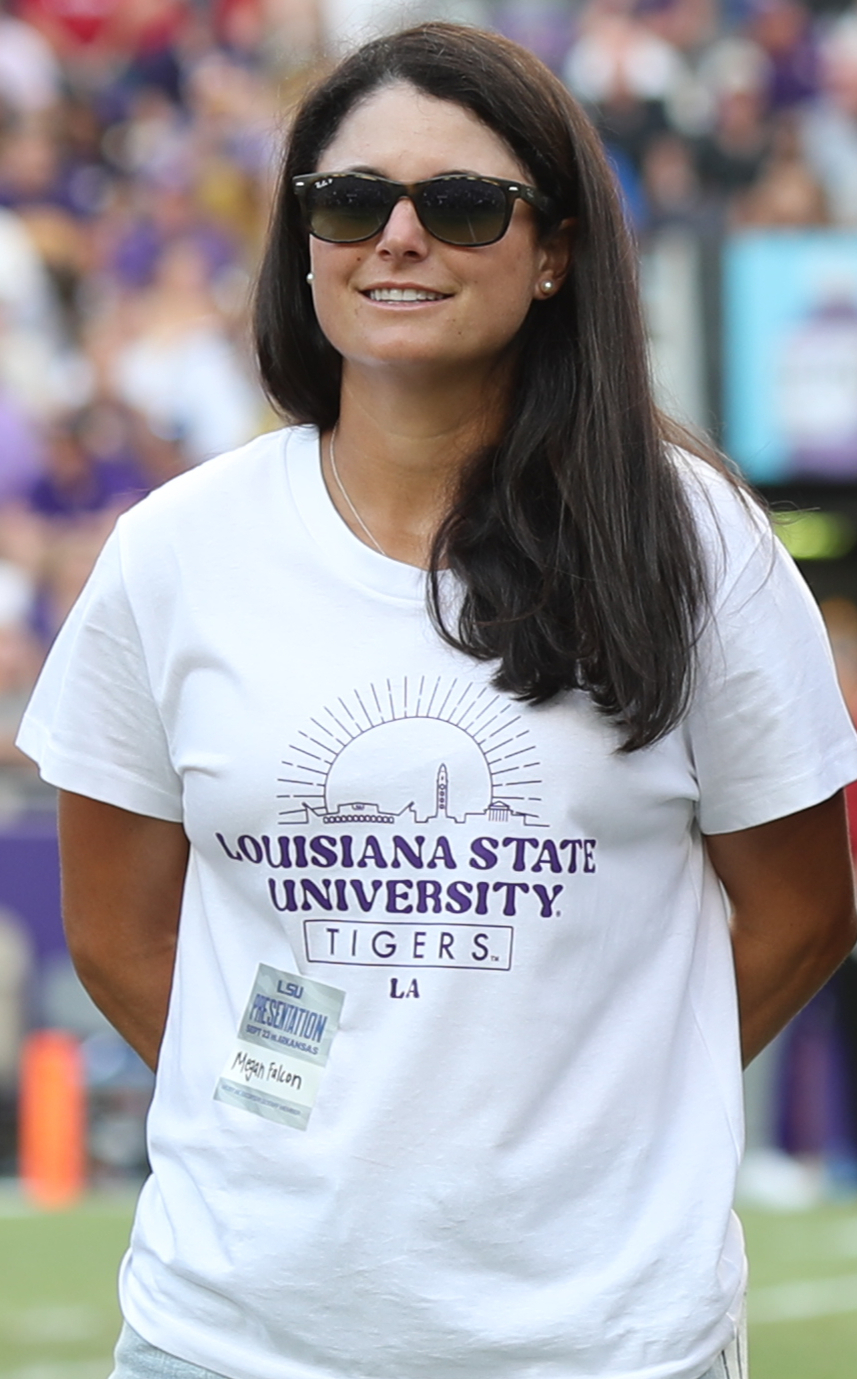
- Falcon in 2023
- Country (sports): United States
- Born: July 19, 1985 (age 40)
- Plays: Right-handed
- Prize money: $29,404

Singles
- Career record: 68–80
- Highest ranking: No. 331 (February 21, 2005)

Doubles
- Career record: 24–43
- Highest ranking: No. 413 (September 13, 2004)

Megan Falcon (born July 19, 1985) is an American tennis coach and former professional player.

Born in 1985, Falcon was raised in Alameda, California. She was the country's top ranked player in the 16-and-under age group and the first collegiate player at Louisiana State University (LSU) to claim the number one ITA rankings. In her three seasons at LSU she earned three singles All-American selections was the 2007 SEC Player of the Year.

Falcon represented the United States at the 2007 Pan American Games in Rio de Janeiro and made it to the bronze-medal game in women's doubles, with Audra Cohen.

Ranked as high as 331 in the world, Falcon's best performance on the professional tour came at the 2004 Copa Colsanitas Seguros Bolivar, a WTA Tour tournament in Bogota, where she won in the first round against top 100 player Gala León García. She lost her second round match in three sets to sixth-seed Ľudmila Cervanová.

Falcon is the women's head coach at Auburn University, previously coaching the University of Kansas from 2019 to 2021.
