= 2005 Copa Colsanitas Seguros Bolívar – Doubles =

Doubles
- 2005 Copa Colsanitas Seguros Bolívar

Final
- Champions: (Switzerland) Emmanuelle Gagliardi (Slovenia) Tina Pisnik
- Runners-up: (Slovakia) Ľubomíra Kurhajcová (Czech Republic) Barbora Strýcová
- Score: 6–4, 6–3

Details
- Draw: 16
- Seeds: 4

Events
Singles	Doubles
← 2004 ·	Copa Colsanitas	· 2006 →

Barbara Schwartz and Jasmin Wöhr were the defending champions, but Schwartz did not compete this year. Wöhr teamed up with Émilie Loit and lost in semifinals to runners-up Ľubomíra Kurhajcová and Barbora Strýcová.

Emmanuelle Gagliardi and Tina Pisnik won the title by defeating Ľubomíra Kurhajcová and Barbora Strýcová 6–4, 6–3 in the final.

== Seeds ==
1. (France) Émilie Loit / (Germany) Jasmin Wöhr (semifinals)
2. (Czech Republic) Eva Birnerová / (Czech Republic) Olga Blahotová (first round)
3. (Italy) Flavia Pennetta / (Argentina) María Emilia Salerni (semifinals)
4. (Slovakia) Ľubomíra Kurhajcová / (Czech Republic) Barbora Strýcová (final)

== Draw ==
=== Key ===
- Q = Qualifier
- WC = Wild card
- LL = Lucky loser
- Alt = Alternate
- SE = Special exempt
- PR = Protected ranking
- ITF = ITF entry
- JE = Junior exempt
- w/o = Walkover
- r = Retired
- d = Defaulted
- SR = Special ranking

=== Draw ===
First round
1	(France) É Loit (Germany) J Wöhr	6	2	6
(Spain) L Domínguez Lino (Spain) A Parra Santonja	4	6	1
(Croatia) I Abramović (Croatia) M Abramović	6	6
(Argentina) M Díaz Oliva (Canada) MÈ Pelletier	3	4
4	(Slovakia) Ľ Kurhajcová (Czech Republic) B Strýcová	6	7
(Argentina) MJ Argeri (Brazil) L Sobral	4	5
(Hungary) M Czink (Ukraine) T Perebiynis	4	6	6
Q	(France) M Johansson (Hungary) Á Szávay	6	4	1
(Spain) RM Andrés Rodríguez (Spain) C Martínez Granados	7	6
(Spain) L Pous Tió (Spain) N Roig	5	3
(Spain) P García (Morocco) B Mouhtassine	3	2
3	(Italy) F Pennetta (Argentina) ME Salerni	6	6
(Brazil) MF Alves (Portugal) F Piedade	7^{7}	1	4
WC	(Colombia) C Castaño (Spain) M Sánchez Lorenzo	6^{4}	6	6
(Switzerland) E Gagliardi (Slovenia) T Pisnik	6	6
2	(Czech Republic) E Birnerová (Czech Republic) O Blahotová	3	3

Quarterfinals
1	(France) É Loit (Germany) J Wöhr	6	6
(Croatia) I Abramović (Croatia) M Abramović	2	2
4	(Slovakia) Ľ Kurhajcová (Czech Republic) B Strýcová	7^{8}	7^{9}
(Hungary) M Czink (Ukraine) T Perebiynis	6^{6}	6^{7}
(Spain) RM Andrés Rodríguez (Spain) C Martínez Granados	3	1
3	(Italy) F Pennetta (Argentina) ME Salerni	6	6
WC	(Colombia) C Castaño (Spain) M Sánchez Lorenzo	2	4
(Switzerland) E Gagliardi (Slovenia) T Pisnik	6	6

Semifinals
1	(France) É Loit (Germany) J Wöhr	1	6	3
4	(Slovakia) Ľ Kurhajcová (Czech Republic) B Strýcová	6	3	6
3	(Italy) F Pennetta (Argentina) ME Salerni	3	2
(Switzerland) E Gagliardi (Slovenia) T Pisnik	6	6

Final
4	(Slovakia) Ľ Kurhajcová (Czech Republic) B Strýcová	4	3
(Switzerland) E Gagliardi (Slovenia) T Pisnik	6	6
