= 2009 Copa Sony Ericsson Colsanitas =

- Date: 14–22 February
- Edition: 12th
- Category: WTA International
- Draw: 32S / 16D
- Prize money: $220,000
- Surface: Clay / outdoor
- Location: Bogotá, Colombia
- Venue: Club Campestre El Rancho

Champions

Singles
- (Spain) María José Martínez Sánchez

Doubles
- (Spain) Nuria Llagostera Vives / (Spain) María José Martínez Sánchez
- Copa Colsanitas

The 2009 Copa Sony Ericsson Colsanitas was a women's tennis tournament played on outdoor clay courts. It was the 12th edition of the Copa Colsanitas, and was on the International category of the 2009 WTA Tour. It took place at the Club Campestre El Rancho in Bogotá, Colombia, from February 14 to 22. This was the first year the tournament was sponsored by Sony Ericsson.

World No. 11 Flavia Pennetta was the top-seeded player. Also in the field were 2008 semifinalist Carla Suárez Navarro, Argentine Gisela Dulko, defending champion Nuria Llagostera Vives, Klára Zakopalová, Mathilde Johansson, María José Martínez Sánchez, and Lourdes Domínguez Lino.

Seventh-seeded María José Martínez Sánchez won the singles title.

== Finals ==
=== Singles ===
(Spain) María José Martínez Sánchez defeated (Argentina) Gisela Dulko, 6–3, 6-2

- It was Martinez Sanchez's first singles title of her career

=== Doubles ===
(Spain) Nuria Llagostera Vives / (Spain) María José Martínez Sánchez defeated (Argentina) Gisela Dulko / (Italy) Flavia Pennetta 7–5, 3–6, [10–7]

== Entrants ==
=== Seeds ===
Athlete	Nationality	Ranking*	Seeding
Flavia Pennetta	Italy	15	1
Carla Suárez Navarro	Spain	28	2
Gisela Dulko	Argentina	46	3
Nuria Llagostera Vives	Spain	76	4
Klára Zakopalová	Czech Republic	94	5
Mathilde Johansson	France	73	6
María José Martínez Sánchez	Spain	66	7
Lourdes Domínguez Lino	Spain	80	8

- Rankings as of February 16, 2009.

=== Other entrants ===
The following players received wildcards into the main draw:

- (Argentina) María Emilia Salerni
- (Spain) Arantxa Parra Santonja
- (Colombia) Viky Núñez Fuentes

The following players received entry from the qualifying draw:

- (Israel) Tzipora Obziler
- (Sweden) Johanna Larsson
- (Hungary) Katalin Marosi
- (Belgium) Tamaryn Hendler
