= 2004 Vancouver Women's Open – Doubles =

Doubles
- 2004 Vancouver Women's Open

Final
- Champions: (United States) Bethanie Mattek (United States) Abigail Spears
- Runners-up: (Belgium) Els Callens (Germany) Anna-Lena Grönefeld
- Score: 6–3, 6–3

Events
Singles	Doubles
Vancouver Women's Open

This was the first WTA edition of the tournament; the previous editions were ITF events.

Amanda Augustus and Mélanie Marois were the defending champions, but did not compete together in 2004. Augustus paired up with Natalie Grandin and lost in the quarterfinals; whilst Marois played with Marie-Ève Pelletier and lost in the first round.

Americans Bethanie Mattek and Abigail Spears won the title, defeating Europeans Els Callens and Anna-Lena Grönefeld in the final in straight sets.

== Seeds ==
1. (Italy) Rita Grande / (United States) Samantha Reeves (first round)
2. (United States) Jennifer Hopkins / (Venezuela) Milagros Sequera (quarterfinals)
3. (United States) Bethanie Mattek / (United States) Abigail Spears (champions)
4. (Italy) Adriana Serra Zanetti / (Italy) Antonella Serra Zanetti (first round)

== Draw ==
=== Key ===
- Q = Qualifier
- WC = Wild card
- LL = Lucky loser
- Alt = Alternate
- SE = Special exempt
- PR = Protected ranking
- ITF = ITF entry
- JE = Junior exempt
- w/o = Walkover
- r = Retired
- d = Defaulted
- SR = Special ranking

=== Draw ===
First round
1	(Italy) R Grande (United States) S Reeves	3	6	6^{5}
(Germany) A Matic (Russia) G Voskoboeva	6	4	7
(Sweden) S Arvidsson (Netherlands) A van Exel	4	3
(United States) L Granville (Turkey) İ Şenoğlu	6	6
3	(United States) B Mattek (United States) A Spears	6	6
WC	(Canada) M Marois (Canada) M-È Pelletier	3	0
(Chinese Taipei) J Lee (China) S Peng	6	6
Q	(United States) S Rao (United States) K Smashey	4	0
(Belgium) E Callens (Germany) A-L Grönefeld	6	6
(Brazil) MF Alves (Latvia) L Dekmeijere	2	2
(United States) A Augustus (South Africa) N Grandin	5
4	(Italy) Ad Serra Zanetti (Italy) An Serra Zanetti	4	r
(Russia) A Jidkova (Australia) B Stewart	6	4	7
(Japan) S Okamoto (Japan) Y Yoshida	2	6	5
(Australia) C Dellacqua (Australia) N Sewell	0	2
2	(United States) J Hopkins (Venezuela) M Sequera	6	6

Quarterfinals
(Germany) A Matic (Russia) G Voskoboeva	6	4	6
(United States) L Granville (Turkey) İ Şenoğlu	2	6	3
3	(United States) B Mattek (United States) A Spears	4	6	6
(Chinese Taipei) J Lee (China) S Peng	6	3	4
(Belgium) E Callens (Germany) A-L Grönefeld	6	4	6
(United States) A Augustus (South Africa) N Grandin	0	6	4
(Russia) A Jidkova (Australia) B Stewart	3	6	6
2	(United States) J Hopkins (Venezuela) M Sequera	6	1	2

Semifinals
(Germany) A Matic (Russia) G Voskoboeva	1	6^{2}
3	(United States) B Mattek (United States) A Spears	6	7
(Belgium) E Callens (Germany) A-L Grönefeld	6	7
(Russia) A Jidkova (Australia) B Stewart	3	5

Final
3	(United States) B Mattek (United States) A Spears	6	6
(Belgium) E Callens (Germany) A-L Grönefeld	3	3

== Qualifying ==
Seeds

1. (Republic of Ireland) Kelly Liggan / (Paraguay) Rosana de los Ríos (first round)
2. (France) Stéphanie Foretz / (France) Camille Pin (first round)

Qualifiers

- (United States) Sunitha Rao / (United States) Kaysie Smashey

Draw

First round
1	(Republic of Ireland) Kelly Liggan (Paraguay) Rosana de los Ríos	5
(United States) Sunitha Rao (United States) Kaysie Smashey	8
WC	(Canada) Stéphanie Dubois (Canada) Aleksandra Wozniak	8
2	(France) Stéphanie Foretz (France) Camille Pin	5

Qualifying competition
(United States) Sunitha Rao (United States) Kaysie Smashey	6	6^{12}	7
WC	(Canada) Stéphanie Dubois (Canada) Aleksandra Wozniak	1	7	5
