= 2006 Copa Colsanitas Seguros Bolívar – Singles =

Singles
- 2006 Copa Colsanitas Seguros Bolívar

Final
- Champion: (Spain) Lourdes Domínguez Lino
- Runner-up: (Italy) Flavia Pennetta
- Score: 7–6^{(7–3)}, 6–4

Details
- Draw: 32
- Seeds: 8

Events
Singles	Doubles
← 2005 ·	Copa Colsanitas	· 2007 →

Lourdes Domínguez Lino took revenge for losing the final in last year and defeated the defending champion Flavia Pennetta 7–6^{(7–3)}, 6–4 in the final.

== Seeds ==
1. (Italy) Flavia Pennetta (final)
2. (Argentina) Gisela Dulko (quarterfinals)
3. (Colombia) Catalina Castaño (quarterfinals)
4. (France) Émilie Loit (quarterfinals)
5. (Argentina) Mariana Díaz Oliva (second round)
6. (Spain) Lourdes Domínguez Lino (champion)
7. (Italy) Antonella Serra Zanetti (first round)
8. (Spain) María Sánchez Lorenzo (semifinals)

== Draw ==
=== Key ===
- Q = Qualifier
- WC = Wild card
- LL = Lucky loser
- Alt = Alternate
- SE = Special exempt
- PR = Protected ranking
- ITF = ITF entry
- JE = Junior exempt
- w/o = Walkover
- r = Retired
- d = Defaulted
- SR = Special ranking

=== Finals ===
Semifinals
1	(Italy) Flavia Pennetta	6	6
8	(Spain) María Sánchez Lorenzo	1	4
6	(Spain) Lourdes Domínguez Lino	6	6
(Slovakia) Ľudmila Cervanová	1	3

Final
1	(Italy) Flavia Pennetta	6^{3}	4
6	(Spain) Lourdes Domínguez Lino	7^{7}	6

=== Top half ===
First round
1	(Italy) F Pennetta	6	6
(Czech Republic) K Böhmová	4	1
(Spain) C Martínez Granados	6^{5}	5
(Croatia) I Abramović	7^{7}	7
(Spain) A Parra Santonja	2	6	2
(United States) B Mattek	6	4	6
(Hungary) Á Szávay	6	4	6
7	(Italy) An Serra Zanetti	1	6	3
3	(Colombia) C Castaño	6	6
WC	(Mexico) D Múñoz Gallegos	2	3
(Argentina) N Gussoni	6	6
(Switzerland) E Gagliardi	2	4
(Spain) L Pous Tió	4	2
(Italy) N Viérin	6	6
Q	(Italy) V Sassi	3	1
8	(Spain) M Sánchez Lorenzo	6	6

Second round
1	(Italy) F Pennetta	6	7
(Croatia) I Abramović	0	5
(United States) B Mattek	6	6
(Hungary) Á Szávay	1	0
3	(Colombia) C Castaño	6	6
(Argentina) N Gussoni	3	1
(Italy) N Viérin	5	5
8	(Spain) M Sánchez Lorenzo	7	7

Quarterfinals
1	(Italy) F Pennetta	6	6
(United States) B Mattek	3	1
3	(Colombia) C Castaño	2	6	1
8	(Spain) M Sánchez Lorenzo	6	3	6

Semifinals
1	(Italy) F Pennetta	6	6
8	(Spain) M Sánchez Lorenzo	1	4

=== Bottom half ===
First round
6	(Spain) L Domínguez Lino	7	6
(Estonia) K Kanepi	5	2
WC	(Spain) MJ Martínez Sánchez	6	6
(France) M Johansson	3	1
(Belarus) A Yakimova	6	6
WC	(Spain) P García	3	0
(Argentina) MJ Argeri	4	1
4	(France) É Loit	6	6
5	(Argentina) M Díaz Oliva	6	3
(Czech Republic) E Birnerová	1	0	r
Q	(Argentina) A Benítez	5	6^{1}
(Slovakia) Ľ Cervanová	7	7^{7}
Q	(United States) N Uberoi	6^{4}	3
Q	(Italy) S Errani	7^{7}	6
(Russia) L Skavronskaia	2	4
2	(Argentina) G Dulko	6	6

Second round
6	(Spain) L Domínguez Lino	7	6^{5}	6
WC	(Spain) MJ Martínez Sánchez	5	7^{7}	2
(Belarus) A Yakimova	0	1
4	(France) É Loit	6	6
5	(Argentina) M Díaz Oliva	6	2	1
(Slovakia) Ľ Cervanová	1	6	6
Q	(Italy) S Errani	4	3
2	(Argentina) G Dulko	6	6

Quarterfinals
6	(Spain) L Domínguez Lino	7^{8}	7
4	(France) É Loit	6^{6}	5
(Slovakia) Ľ Cervanová	7^{7}	5	6
2	(Argentina) G Dulko	6^{2}	7	3

Semifinals
6	(Spain) L Domínguez Lino	6	6
(Slovakia) Ľ Cervanová	1	3
