= 2009 Copa Sony Ericsson Colsanitas – Doubles =

Tennis tournament

Doubles
- 2009 Copa Sony Ericsson Colsanitas

Final
- Champions: (Spain) Nuria Llagostera Vives (Spain) María José Martínez Sánchez
- Runners-up: (Argentina) Gisela Dulko (Italy) Flavia Pennetta
- Score: 7–5, 3–6, 10–7

Details
- Draw: 16
- Seeds: 4

Events
Singles	Doubles
- Copa Colsanitas

Iveta Benešová and Bethanie Mattek were the defending champions, but they chose not to participate this year.

== Seeds ==
1. (Spain) Nuria Llagostera Vives / (Spain) María José Martínez Sánchez (champions)
2. (Argentina) Gisela Dulko / (Italy) Flavia Pennetta (final)
3. (Romania) Edina Gallovits / (Czech Republic) Barbora Záhlavová-Strýcová (semifinals)
4. (Spain) Lourdes Domínguez Lino / (Spain) Arantxa Parra Santonja (semifinals)

== Draw ==
Key

- Q = Qualifier
- WC = Wild card
- LL = Lucky loser
- Alt = Alternate
- ITF = ITF entry
- PR = Protected ranking
- SR = Special ranking
- SE = Special exempt
- JE = Junior exempt
- JR = Junior Accelerator Programme entrant
- CO = College Accelerator Programme entrant
- NG = Next Gen Accelerator Program entrant
- w/o = Walkover
- r = Retired
- d = Defaulted

First round
1	(Spain) N Llagostera Vives (Spain) MJ Martínez Sánchez	6	6
(Sweden) J Larsson (United Kingdom) A Smith	2	1
(Czech Republic) P Cetkovská (France) M Johansson	6	7
(Estonia) M Ani (Romania) IR Olaru	3	6^{1}
4	(Spain) L Domínguez Lino (Spain) A Parra Santonja	6	6
(Portugal) F Piedade (Romania) A Szatmári	4	0
(Hungary) K Marosi (Brazil) M Tavares	4	6	[4]
(Argentina) S Esperón (Belgium) T Hendler	6	3	[10]
(Ukraine) O Savchuk (Turkey) Şenoğlu	6^{3}	7	[11]
(Germany) M Müller (Belarus) A Yakimova	7	5	[13]
ALT	(Argentina) ME Salerni (Czech Republic) K Zakopalová	1	4
3	(Romania) E Gallovits (Czech Republic) B Záhlavová-Strýcová	6	6
(Spain) E Cabeza Candela (Spain) S del Barrio Aragón	6	5	[5]
(Colombia) C Castaño (Italy) R Oprandi	3	7	[10]
(Austria) P Mayr (Slovenia) M Zec Peškirič	2	3
2	(Argentina) G Dulko (Italy) F Pennetta	6	6

Quarterfinals
1	(Spain) N Llagostera Vives (Spain) MJ Martínez Sánchez	6	6
(Czech Republic) P Cetkovská (France) M Johansson	1	3
4	(Spain) L Domínguez Lino (Spain) A Parra Santonja	7	6
(Argentina) S Esperón (Belgium) T Hendler	6^{1}	2
(Germany) M Müller (Belarus) A Yakimova	1	2
3	(Romania) E Gallovits (Czech Republic) B Záhlavová-Strýcová	6	6
(Colombia) C Castaño (Italy) R Oprandi	5	1
2	(Argentina) G Dulko (Italy) F Pennetta	7	6

Semifinals
1	(Spain) N Llagostera Vives (Spain) MJ Martínez Sánchez	6	6
4	(Spain) L Domínguez Lino (Spain) A Parra Santonja	3	3
3	(Romania) E Gallovits (Czech Republic) B Záhlavová-Strýcová	6	2	[18]
2	(Argentina) G Dulko (Italy) F Pennetta	4	6	[20]

Final
1	(Spain) N Llagostera Vives (Spain) MJ Martínez Sánchez	7	3	[10]
2	(Argentina) G Dulko (Italy) F Pennetta	5	6	[7]
