= Lana Popadić =

Croatian tennis player (born 1983)

- Country (sports): Croatia
- Born: 24 April 1983 (age 43)
- Prize money: $50,689

Singles
- Career record: 111–102
- Highest ranking: No. 182 (5 July 2004)

Grand Slam singles results
- Australian Open: Q2 (2005)
- French Open: Q1 (2004)
- US Open: Q2 (2004)

Doubles
- Career record: 35–33
- Career titles: 1 ITF
- Highest ranking: No. 277 (29 September 2003)

Lana Popadić (born 24 April 1983) is a former professional tennis player from Croatia.

== Tennis career ==
Popadić is most noted for her performance at the 2004 Copa Colsanitas Seguros Bolivar, a WTA Tour tournament held in Bogota. Going into the event with a ranking of 235, Popadić won her way through qualifying, then had wins in two main-draw matches, over world No. 61 Arantxa Parra Santonja and Antonella Serra Zanetti of Italy. She was beaten in the quarterfinals by second seed María Sánchez Lorenzo in three sets.

Most of her career was played on the ITF circuit and she won one title in 2001, the doubles of a $10,000 tournament in Athens, where she was also runner-up in the singles that year. She never made a Grand Slam main draw but participated in the qualifying draws for the Australian, French and US Opens. In 2005, she retired from professional tennis.

She now works as a lawyer in Zagreb as owner at Odvjetnički ured Lana Popadić Katić.

== ITF finals ==
$25,000 tournaments
$10,000 tournaments

=== Singles (0–1) ===
Outcome	No.	Date	Tournament	Surface	Opponent	Score
Runner-up	1.	1 July 2001	Athens, Greece	Clay	(Germany) Jacqueline Froehlich	0–6, 7–5, 4–6

=== Doubles (1–3) ===
Outcome	No.	Date	Tournament	Surface	Partner	Opponents	Score
Winner	1.	1 July 2001	Athens, Greece	Clay	(Serbia and Montenegro) Dina Milošević	(Greece) Irini Alevizopoulou (Russia) Irina Kornienko	7–6^{(3)}, 6–3
Runner-up	1.	23 September 2001	Barcelona, Spain	Clay	(Spain) María José Sánchez Alayeto	(Spain) Anna Font (Spain) Arantxa Parra Santonja	1–6, 2–6
Runner-up	2.	14 April 2003	San Luis Potosí, Mexico	Clay	(France) Kildine Chevalier	(Argentina) Jorgelina Cravero (Argentina) Vanina García Sokol	1–6, 3–6
Runner-up	3.	22 June 2003	Périgueux, France	Clay	(Madagascar) Natacha Randriantefy	(Spain) María José Martínez Sánchez (Spain) Anabel Medina Garrigues	0–6, 3–6
