= 2005 Copa Colsanitas Seguros Bolívar =

Tennis tournament

2005 Copa Colsanitas Seguros Bolivar
- Date: 14–20 February
- Edition: 8th
- Category: Tier III
- Draw: 32S / 16D
- Prize money: $170,000
- Surface: Clay / outdoor
- Location: Bogotá, Colombia

Champions

Singles
- (Italy) Flavia Pennetta

Doubles
- (Switzerland) Emmanuelle Gagliardi / (Slovenia) Tina Pisnik
- Copa Colsanitas

The 2005 Copa Colsanitas Seguros Bolivar was a women's tennis tournament played on outdoor clay courts at the Club Campestre El Rancho in Bogotá, Colombia that was part of Tier III of the 2005 WTA Tour. It was the eighth edition of the Copa Colsanitas and ran from 14 to 20 February 2005. Second-seeded Flavia Pennetta won the singles title and earned $27,000 first-prize money. Emmanuelle Gagliardi and Tina Pisnik won the doubles title.

== Finals ==
=== Singles ===
(Italy) Flavia Pennetta defeated (Spain) Lourdes Domínguez Lino 7–6^{(7–4)}, 6–4

- It was Pennetta's 1st singles title of the year and the 2nd of her career.

=== Doubles ===
(Switzerland) Emmanuelle Gagliardi / (Slovenia) Tina Pisnik defeated (Czech Republic) Ľubomíra Kurhajcová / (Czech Republic) Barbora Strýcová 6–4, 6–3
