= 2004 Copa Colsanitas Seguros Bolívar =

2004 Copa Colsanitas Seguros Bolivar
- Date: 23–29 February
- Edition: 7th
- Category: Tier III
- Draw: 30S / 16D
- Prize money: $170,000
- Surface: Clay / outdoor
- Location: Bogotá, Colombia

Champions

Singles
- (Colombia) Fabiola Zuluaga

Doubles
- (Austria) Barbara Schwartz / (Germany) Jasmin Wöhr
- Copa Colsanitas

The 2004 Copa Colsanitas Seguros Bolivar was a women's tennis tournament played on outdoor clay courts at the Club Campestre El Rancho in Bogotá, Colombia that was part of Tier III of the 2004 WTA Tour. It was the seventh edition of the Copa Colsanitas and ran from 23 to 29 February 2004. First-seeded and defending champion Fabiola Zuluaga won her third consecutive singles title, and fourth in total, at the event and earned $27,000 first-prize money.

== Finals ==
=== Singles ===
(Colombia) Fabiola Zuluaga defeated (Spain) María Sánchez Lorenzo 3–6, 6–4, 6–2

- It was Zuluaga's 1st singles title of the year and the 6th of her career.

=== Doubles ===
(Austria) Barbara Schwartz / (Germany) Jasmin Wöhr defeated (Spain) Anabel Medina Garrigues / (Spain) Arantxa Parra Santonja 6–1, 6–3
