= Vanina García Sokol =

Argentine tennis player

- Full name: María Vanina García Sokol
- Country (sports): Argentina
- Born: 27 December 1983 (age 42)
- Plays: Right-handed
- Prize money: $77,859

Singles
- Career record: 194–134
- Career titles: 3 ITF
- Highest ranking: No. 191 (21 February 2005)

Grand Slam singles results
- Wimbledon: Q1 (2005)
- US Open: Q2 (2004)

Doubles
- Career record: 54–69
- Career titles: 3 ITF
- Highest ranking: No. 249 (5 April 2004)

María Vanina García Sokol (born 27 December 1983) is a former professional tennis player from Argentina.

== Biography ==
García Sokol, who comes from the Misiones Province of Argentina, turned professional at 17 years of age.

In 2003 she was a member of Argentina's Fed Cup squad and represented Argentina at the Pan American Games held in Santo Domingo.

Competing mostly on the ITF Women's Circuit, she had a best ranking of 191 in the world and won a total of three ITF singles titles. She twice qualified for the main draw of a WTA Tour tournament, the Vancouver Open in 2004 and the 2005 Copa Colsanitas Seguros Bolivar in Bogota. In 2007, she retired from tennis.

Based in Buenos Aires, she now works as a tennis coach and has started her own foundation.

== ITF Circuit finals ==
$25,000 tournaments
$10,000 tournaments

=== Singles (3–7) ===
| Outcome | No. | Date | Tournament | Surface | Opponent | Score |
|---|---|---|---|---|---|---|
| Runner-up | 1. | 1 April 2001 | Santiago, Chile | Clay | (Brazil) Joana Cortez | 3–6, 3–6 |
| Runner-up | 2. | 6 April 2002 | Belo Horizonte, Brazil | Hard | (Brazil) Maria Fernanda Alves | 3–6, 1–6 |
| Winner | 1. | 13 October 2002 | Los Mochis, Mexico | Clay | (Uruguay) Ana Lucía Migliarini de León | 7–5, 6–3 |
| Runner-up | 3. | 20 April 2003 | San Luis Potosí, Mexico | Clay | (Italy) Maria Elena Camerin | 0–6, 4–6 |
| Winner | 2. | 31 August 2003 | Paraná, Argentina | Clay | (Argentina) Jorgelina Cravero | 4–6, 6–3, 6–3 |
| Winner | 3. | 20 June 2004 | Gorizia, Italy | Clay | (Germany) Martina Müller | 6–1, 6–4 |
| Runner-up | 4. | 2 July 2006 | Padova, Italy | Clay | (France) Alizé Cornet | 1–6, 4–6 |
| Runner-up | 5. | 17 March 2007 | Mérida, Mexico | Hard | (France) Julie Coin | 5–7, 4–6 |
| Runner-up | 6. | 27 March 2007 | Xalapa, Mexico | Hard | (Colombia) Mariana Duque Mariño | 3–6, 6–7 |
| Runner-up | 7. | 21 May 2007 | Córdoba, Argentina | Clay | (Argentina) Soledad Esperón | 2–6, 3–3 ret. |

=== Doubles (3–1) ===
| Outcome | No. | Date | Tournament | Surface | Partner | Opponents | Score |
|---|---|---|---|---|---|---|---|
| Runner-up | 1. | 3 August 2000 | Lima, Peru | Clay | (Uruguay) Claudia Salgues | (United States) Tiffany Dabek (Uruguay) Cecilia Guillenea | 6–7, 2–6 |
| Winner | 1. | 20 April 2003 | San Luis Potosí, Mexico | Clay | (Argentina) Jorgelina Cravero | (France) Kildine Chevalier (Croatia) Lana Popadić | 6–1, 6–3 |
| Winner | 2. | 31 August 2003 | Paraná, Argentina | Clay | (Argentina) Jorgelina Cravero | (Argentina) Erica Krauth (Brazil) Carla Tiene | 6–1, 6–3 |
| Winner | 3. | 17 March 2007 | Mérida, Mexico | Hard | (Brazil) Maria Fernanda Alves | (South Africa) Chanelle Scheepers (United States) Robin Stephenson | 6–3, 6–2 |
