= Olga Kalyuzhnaya =

Russian tennis player

Olga Kalyuzhnaya Ольга Калюжная
- Country (sports): Russia
- Born: 19 December 1982 (age 42); Soviet Union
- Prize money: $48,206

Singles
- Career record: 112–81
- Career titles: 3 ITF
- Highest ranking: No. 202 (21 April 2003)

Grand Slam singles results
- French Open: Q1 (2003)
- Wimbledon: Q1 (2003)
- US Open: Q2 (2003)

Doubles
- Career record: 23–31
- Career titles: 0
- Highest ranking: No. 362 (25 August 2003)

Olga Kalyuzhnaya (Ольга Калюжная; born 19 December 1982) is a Russian former tennis player.

She entered the 2003 Hyderabad Open but lost in the final qualifying round to Zheng Jie. In 2002, she played in the main draw of the Tashkent Open but retired in round two due to injury.

== ITF Circuit finals ==
$40,000 tournaments
$25,000 tournaments
$10,000 tournaments

=== Singles (3–4) ===
Outcome	No.	Date	Tournament	Surface	Opponent	Score
Runner-up	1.	27 August 2000	Toluca, Mexico	Clay	(Mexico) Erika Valdés	4–6, 6–4, 6–7
Runner-up	2.	30 October 2000	New Delhi, India	Hard	(Slovakia) Lenka Dlhopolcova	1–4, 4–1, 4–5, 2–4
Runner-up	3.	5 November 2001	Al Mansoura, Egypt	Clay	(Italy) Anna Floris	6–7, 7–6, 3–6
Winner	1.	24 February 2002	Victoria, Mexico	Hard	(Uruguay) Daniela Olivera	7–5, 6–2
Runner-up	4.	7 July 2002	Rabat, Morocco	Clay	(Poland) Joanna Sakowicz-Kostecka	3–6, 5–7
Winner	2.	1 July 2007	Breda, Netherlands	Clay	(Germany) Laura Haberkorn	6–4, 7–6
Winner	3.	29 June 2008	Breda, Netherlands	Clay	(Netherlands) Danielle Harmsen	4–6, 6–2, 6–4

=== Doubles (0–3) ===
Outcome	No.	Date	Tournament	Surface	Partner	Opponents	Score
Runner-up	1.	10 April 2002	Mexico Circuit	Hard	(Brazil) Maria Fernanda Alves	(Argentina) Melisa Arévalo (Brazil) Vanessa Menga	2–6, 1–6
Runner-up	2.	24 August 2002	Maribor, Slovenia	Clay	(Ukraine) Alona Bondarenko	(Slovenia) Tina Hergold (Hungary) Eszter Molnár	1–6, 1–6
Runner-up	3.	25 February 2012	Tallinn, Estonia	Hard (i)	(Netherlands) Jaimy-Gayle van de Wal	(France) Lou Brouleau (Belarus) Aliaksandra Sasnovich	3–6, 2–6
