= 2007 Copa Colsanitas Santander =

- Date: 19–25 February
- Edition: 10th
- Category: Tier III Series
- Draw: 32S / 16D
- Prize money: $175,000
- Surface: Clay / outdoor
- Location: Bogotá, Colombia
- Venue: Club Campestre El Rancho

Champions

Singles
- (Italy) Roberta Vinci

Doubles
- (Spain) Lourdes Domínguez Lino / (Argentina) Paola Suárez
- Copa Colsanitas

The 2007 Copa Colsanitas Santander was a women's tennis tournament played on outdoor clay courts. It was the 10th edition of the Copa Colsanitas, and part of the Tier III Series of the 2007 WTA Tour. It took place at the Club Campestre El Rancho in Bogotá, Colombia, from 19 to 25 February 2007. Sixth-seeded Roberta Vinci won the singles title and earned $25,840 first-prize money.

== Finals ==
=== Singles ===
(Italy) Roberta Vinci defeated (Italy) Tathiana Garbin, 6–7^{(5–7)}, 6–4, 0–3 ret.

- It was Roberta Vinci's first career title.

=== Doubles ===
(Spain) Lourdes Domínguez Lino / (Argentina) Paola Suárez defeated (Italy) Flavia Pennetta / (Italy) Roberta Vinci, 1–6, 6–3, 11–9
