= Viky Núñez Fuentes =

Colombian tennis player (born 1988)

Viky Núñez
- Full name: Viky Núñez Fuentes
- Country (sports): Colombia
- Born: 14 October 1988 (age 36); Bogotá, Colombia
- Turned pro: 2005
- Retired: 2016
- Plays: Right-handed
- Prize money: $32,261

Singles
- Career record: 71–75
- Career titles: 2 ITF
- Highest ranking: No. 496 (27 August 2007)

Doubles
- Career record: 64–53
- Career titles: 8 ITF
- Highest ranking: No. 415 (28 July 2008)

Viky Núñez Fuentes (Latin American Spanish: [ˈbiki ˈnuɲes ˈfwentes]; born 14 October 1988) is a Colombian former professional tennis player.

She has career-high WTA rankings of 496 in singles and 415 in doubles. In her career, Núñez won two singles and eight doubles titles on the ITF Circuit.

She made her WTA Tour main-draw debut at the 2007 Copa Colsanitas where she received a wildcard; she then too was awarded wildcards for the 2008 and the 2009 Copa Colsanitas.

Núñez made her WTA Tour doubles main-draw debut also at the 2007 Copa Colsanitas, partnering Mariana Duque.

Playing for the Colombia Fed Cup team, she accumulated a win–loss record of 10–4.

Núñez retired from professional tennis in 2016. Her last match on the circuit was in July 2011.

== ITF Circuit finals ==
=== Singles: 5 (2 titles, 3 runner-ups) ===
Legend $25,000 tournaments $10,000 tournaments	Finals by surface Hard (0–1) Clay (2–2)

Outcome	Date	Tournament	Surface	Opponent	Score
Winner	27 August 2006	ITF Bogotá, Colombia	Clay (i)	(Argentina) Flavia Mignola	6–1, 7–6^{(7–2)}
Runner-up	20 May 2007	ITF Irapuato, Mexico	Hard	(Brazil) Maria Fernanda Alves	3–6, 5–7
Winner	15 July 2007	ITF Bogotá	Clay	(Peru) Ingrid Várgas Calvo	7–5, 6–2
Runner-up	1 June 2008	ITF Braga, Portugal	Clay	(Netherlands) Marlot Meddens	5–7, 2–6
Runner-up	14 September 2008	ITF Bogotá	Clay (i)	(Bulgaria) Aleksandrina Naydenova	4–6, 6–7^{(2–7)}

=== Doubles: 10 (8 titles, 2 runner-ups) ===
Legend $25,000 tournaments $10,000 tournaments	Finals by surface Hard (2–0) Clay (6–2)

Outcome	Date	Tournament	Surface	Partner	Opponents	Score
Runner-up	18 September 2004	ITF Bogotá, Colombia	Clay	(Colombia) Mariana Duque Mariño	(Ecuador) Estefania Balda Álvarez (Colombia) Karen Castiblanco	6–7^{(2–7)}, 5–7
Winner	14 May 2006	ITF Los Mochis, México	Clay	(Colombia) Mariana Duque Mariño	(Argentina) Agustina Lepore (Argentina) María Irigoyen	7–5, 6–3
Winner	3 June 2006	ITF León, México	Hard (i)	(Colombia) Mariana Duque Mariño	(Mexico) Erika Clarke (United States) Courtney Nagle	7–6^{(7–3)}, 7–6^{(7–4)}
Runner-up	26 August 2006	ITF Bogotá	Clay (i)	(Colombia) Mariana Duque Mariño	(Colombia) Karen Castiblanco (Brazil) Roxane Vaisemberg	4–6, 6–7^{(4–7)}
Winner	2 September 2006	ITF Bogotá	Clay	(Colombia) Mariana Duque Mariño	(Argentina) Vanesa Furlanetto (Argentina) María Irigoyen	6–4, 6–2
Winner	14 July 2007	Open Bogotá, Colombia	Clay	(Colombia) Gabriela Mejía Tenorio	(United States) Hannah Berner (United States) Nataly Yoo	6–0, 6–1
Winner	12 July 2008	Open Bogotá	Clay	(Colombia) Mariana Duque Mariño	(Argentina) Mailen Auroux (Italy) Nicole Clerico	6–3, 6–4
Winner	19 July 2008	ITF Cartagena, Colombia	Hard	(Colombia) Paula Catalina Robles Garcia	(Peru) Claudia Razzeto (United States) Nataly Yoo	w/o
Winner	13 September 2008	ITF Bogotá	Clay (i)	(Colombia) Paula Catalina Robles Garcia	(Colombia) Yuliana Lizarazo (Bulgaria) Aleksandrina Naydenova	6–3, 6–4
Winner	29 January 2011	ITF Bucaramanga, Colombia	Clay	(Colombia) Catalina Castaño	(Brazil) Nathália Rossi (Slovakia) Zuzana Zlochová	7–6^{(7–3)}, 6–1
