= 2023 Engie Open Nantes Atlantique – Doubles =

Doubles
- 2023 Engie Open Nantes Atlantique

Final
- Champions: (United Kingdom) Ali Collins (United Kingdom) Yuriko Miyazaki
- Runners-up: (United Kingdom) Emily Appleton (Netherlands) Isabelle Haverlag
- Score: 7–6^{(7–4)}, 6–2

Events
| Singles | Doubles |
| ← 2022 · | Open Nantes Atlantique | · 2024 → |

Magali Kempen and Wu Fang-hsien were the defending champions but chose not to participate.

Ali Collins and Yuriko Miyazaki won the title, defeating Emily Appleton and Isabelle Haverlag in the final, 7–6^{(7–4)}, 6–2.

== Seeds ==
1. (United Kingdom) Alicia Barnett / (United Kingdom) Maia Lumsden (semifinals)
2. (United Kingdom) Emily Appleton / (Netherlands) Isabelle Haverlag (final)
3. (United Kingdom) Ali Collins / (United Kingdom) Yuriko Miyazaki (champions)
4. (Ukraine) Maryna Kolb / (Ukraine) Nadiia Kolb (quarterfinals)

== Draw ==
=== Key ===
- Q = Qualifier
- WC = Wild card
- LL = Lucky loser
- Alt = Alternate
- ITF = ITF entry
- PR = Protected ranking
- SR = Special ranking
- SE = Special exempt
- JE = Junior exempt
- JR = Junior Accelerator Programme entrant
- CO = College Accelerator Programme entrant
- NG = Next Gen Accelerator Program entrant
- w/o = Walkover
- r = Retired
- d = Defaulted

First round
(Ukraine) M Kostiuk (France) C Levivier | 4 | 3
(France) M Noël (France) I Ramialison | 6 | 6
(Algeria) I Ibbou; P Kudermetova | 3 | 6 | [10]
(France) C Noël (France) A Soulié | 6 | 1 | [6]
(United Kingdom) M Brooks (United Kingdom) H Hutchinson | 5 | 6 | [10]
(Germany) L Böhner (Netherlands) L Tran | 7 | 4 | [5]
(France) T Lemaître (Romania) AG Vasilescu
4 | (Ukraine) M Kolb (Ukraine) N Kolb | w/o
E Maklakova; E Reyngold | 1 | 6 | [10]
(Philippines) A Eala (Indonesia) J Rompies | 6 | 3 | [6]

Quarterfinals
1 | (United Kingdom) A Barnett (United Kingdom) M Lumsden | 6 | 6
(France) M Noël (France) I Ramialison | 4 | 0
3 | (United Kingdom) A Collins (United Kingdom) Y Miyazaki | 6 | 7^{7}
(Algeria) I Ibbou; P Kudermetova | 2 | 6^{3}
(United Kingdom) M Brooks (United Kingdom) H Hutchinson | 6 | 4 | [10]
4 | (Ukraine) M Kolb (Ukraine) N Kolb | 4 | 6 | [6]
E Maklakova; E Reyngold
2 | (United Kingdom) E Appleton (Netherlands) I Haverlag | w/o

Semifinals
1 | (United Kingdom) A Barnett (United Kingdom) M Lumsden | 6 | 3 | [9]
3 | (United Kingdom) A Collins (United Kingdom) Y Miyazaki | 3 | 6 | [11]
(United Kingdom) M Brooks (United Kingdom) H Hutchinson | 4 | 3
2 | (United Kingdom) E Appleton (Netherlands) I Haverlag | 6 | 6

Final
3 | (United Kingdom) A Collins (United Kingdom) Y Miyazaki | 7^{7} | 6
2 | (United Kingdom) E Appleton (Netherlands) I Haverlag | 6^{4} | 2
