= 2022 Engie Open Nantes Atlantique – Singles =

Singles
- 2022 Engie Open Nantes Atlantique

Final
- Champion: Kamilla Rakhimova
- Runner-up: (China) Wang Xinyu
- Score: 6–4, 6–4

Events
Singles	Doubles
← 2021 ·	Open Nantes Atlantique	· 2023 →

Anhelina Kalinina was the defending champion but she chose to compete at the 2022 GB Pro-Series Shrewsbury instead.

Kamilla Rakhimova won the title, defeating Wang Xinyu in the final, 6–4, 6–4.

== Seeds ==
1. (Germany) Tamara Korpatsch (semifinals)
2. (France) Océane Dodin (second round)
3. Kamilla Rakhimova (champion)
4. (China) Wang Xinyu (final)
5. (Belgium) Ysaline Bonaventure (withdrew)
6. Vitalia Diatchenko (quarterfinals)
7. (Ukraine) Daria Snigur (semifinals, withdrew)
8. (Denmark) Clara Tauson (quarterfinals)

== Draw ==
=== Key ===
- Q = Qualifier
- WC = Wild card
- LL = Lucky loser
- Alt = Alternate
- SE = Special exempt
- PR = Protected ranking
- ITF = ITF entry
- JE = Junior exempt
- w/o = Walkover
- r = Retired
- d = Defaulted
- SR = Special ranking

=== Finals ===
Semifinals
1	(Germany) Tamara Korpatsch	2	4
4	(China) Wang Xinyu	6	6
3	Kamilla Rakhimova	w/o
7	(Ukraine) Daria Snigur

Final
4	(China) Wang Xinyu	4	4
3	Kamilla Rakhimova	6	6

=== Top half ===
First round
1	(Germany) T Korpatsch	6	6
Q	(France) A Cirotte	0	0
Q	(Turkey) B Cengiz	0	2
I Shymanovich	6	6
WC	(France) L Nguyen Tan	0	0
(Italy) L Stefanini	6	6
(Spain) M Bassols Ribera	6	6
Q	(Algeria) I Ibbou	2	3
4	(China) Xin Wang	6	6
WC	(France) Y Bartashevich	1	2
WC	(France) M Rouvroy	6	4	3
E Kazionova	3	6	6
Q	(France) A Tubello	6	1
Q	(France) E Léné	3	0^{r}
Q	(Slovenia) V Erjavec	2	6^{6}
6	V Diatchenko	6	7^{8}

Second round
1	(Germany) T Korpatsch	7^{7}	6^{6}	6
I Shymanovich	6^{3}	7^{8}	3
(Italy) L Stefanini	7	7^{7}
(Spain) M Bassols Ribera	5	6^{2}
4	(China) Xin Wang	6	6
E Kazionova	1	3
Q	(France) A Tubello	6	4	5
6	V Diatchenko	1	6	7

Quarterfinals
1	(Germany) T Korpatsch	6	6
(Italy) L Stefanini	4	0
4	(China) Xin Wang	6	1	7
6	V Diatchenko	4	6	5

Semifinals
1	(Germany) T Korpatsch	2	4
4	(China) Xin Wang	6	6

=== Bottom half ===
First round
8	(Denmark) C Tauson	6	7
(Greece) V Grammatikopoulou	1	5
(Germany) M Barthel	3	6	3
Q	(South Africa) I Kruger	6	4	6
(France) A Albié	6	7^{7}
(Netherlands) L Pattinama Kerkhove	1	6^{5}
(Belgium) M Kempen	5	5
3	K Rakhimova	7	7
7	(Ukraine) D Snigur	6	6
WC	(France) C Noël	4	1
LL	(France) Y Mansouri	1	6^{5}
A Tikhonova	6	7^{7}
Y Hatouka	6	0
(United Kingdom) SB Grey	2	0^{r}
Q	M Timofeeva	4	1
2	(France) O Dodin	6	6

Second round
8	(Denmark) C Tauson	6	2	6
Q	(South Africa) I Kruger	1	6	4
(France) A Albié	3	4
3	K Rakhimova	6	6
7	(Ukraine) D Snigur	6	6
A Tikhonova	3	3
Y Hatouka	7^{7}	6
2	(France) O Dodin	6^{0}	4

Quarterfinals
8	(Denmark) C Tauson	6^{5}	6	2
3	K Rakhimova	7^{7}	3	6
7	(Ukraine) D Snigur	6	6
Y Hatouka	3	2

Semifinals
3	K Rakhimova	w/o
7	(Ukraine) D Snigur
