= 2023 Engie Open Nantes Atlantique =

Tennis tournament

- Date: 30 October–5 November 2023
- Edition: 19th
- Category: ITF Women's World Tennis Tour
- Prize money: $60,000
- Surface: Hard / Indoor
- Location: Nantes, France

Champions

Singles
- (France) Océane Dodin

Doubles
- (United Kingdom) Ali Collins / (United Kingdom) Yuriko Miyazaki
← 2022 ·	Open Nantes Atlantique	· 2024 →

The 2023 Engie Open Nantes Atlantique was a professional tennis tournament played on indoor hard courts. It was the nineteenth edition of the tournament which was part of the 2023 ITF Women's World Tennis Tour. It took place in Nantes, France between 30 October and 5 November 2023.

== Champions ==
=== Singles ===
- (France) Océane Dodin def. (Czech Republic) Gabriela Knutson, 6–7^{(2–7)}, 6–3, 6–2

=== Doubles ===
- (United Kingdom) Ali Collins / (United Kingdom) Yuriko Miyazaki def. (United Kingdom) Emily Appleton / (Netherlands) Isabelle Haverlag, 7–6^{(7–4)}, 6–2

== Singles main draw entrants ==
=== Seeds ===
Country	Player	Rank^{1}	Seed
FRA	Océane Dodin	110	1
~~JPN~~	~~Mai Hontama~~	~~121~~	~~2~~
FRA	Léolia Jeanjean	135	3
	Polina Kudermetova	147	4
FRA	Jessika Ponchet	159	5
TUR	Zeynep Sönmez	163	6
SUI	Simona Waltert	167	7
FRA	Elsa Jacquemot	176	8
CZE	Gabriela Knutson	179	9

- ^{1} Rankings are as of 23 October 2023.

=== Other entrants ===
The following players received wildcards into the singles main draw:

- (France) Émeline Dartron
- (France) Amandine Hesse
- (France) Tiphanie Lemaître
- (France) Mallaurie Noël

The following player received entry as a junior exempt:

- (Belgium) Sofia Costoulas

The following players received entry from the qualifying draw:

- (United Kingdom) Emily Appleton
- (France) Nahia Berecoechea
- (France) Manon Léonard
- (France) Diana Martynov
- (France) Chloé Noël
- (Ukraine) Veronika Podrez
- (Australia) Tina Nadine Smith
- (Netherlands) Lian Tran

The following player received entry as a lucky loser:

- (United Kingdom) Matilda Mutavdzic
