= Markéta Vondroušová career statistics =

(Note: The WTA Premier tournaments were reclassified as WTA 500 tournaments in 2021.)

Career finals
Discipline	Type	Won	Lost	Total
Singles	Grand Slam	1	1	2
Singles	WTA Finals	–	–	–
Singles	WTA Elite Trophy	–	–	–
Singles	WTA 1000 (Note: The Premier 5 & Premier Mandatory tournaments were reclassified as WTA 1000 tournaments in 2021.)	–	–	–
Singles	WTA 500	1	–	1
Singles	WTA 250 (Note: The International were reclassified as WTA 250 tournaments in 2021.)	1	2	3
Singles	Olympics	–	1	1
Singles	Total	3	4	7
Doubles	Grand Slam	–	–	–
Doubles	WTA Finals	–	–	–
Doubles	WTA 1000	–	1	1
Doubles	WTA 500	–	2	2
Doubles	WTA 250	–	–	–
Doubles	Olympics	–	–	–
Doubles	Total	0	3	3

This is a list of the main career statistics of Czech tennis player Markéta Vondroušová. In July 2023, she won her biggest title up to date at the Wimbledon Championships. As a result, she made her top-ten debut, and two months later, her ranking rose to a career-high of world No. 6. Playing for her home nation, the Czech Republic, she won the silver medal at the 2020 Summer Olympics (postponed to 2021 due to COVID-19) in the singles event, and she also played two Billie Jean King Cup semifinals and finished runner-up at the 2019 French Open.

From the beginning Vondroušová showed competition talent: she won two girls' doubles titles at major tournaments, alongside Miriam Kolodziejová, at the Australian Open and French Open in 2015. She also finished runners-up in girls' doubles with CiCi Bellis, at the French Open in 2014.

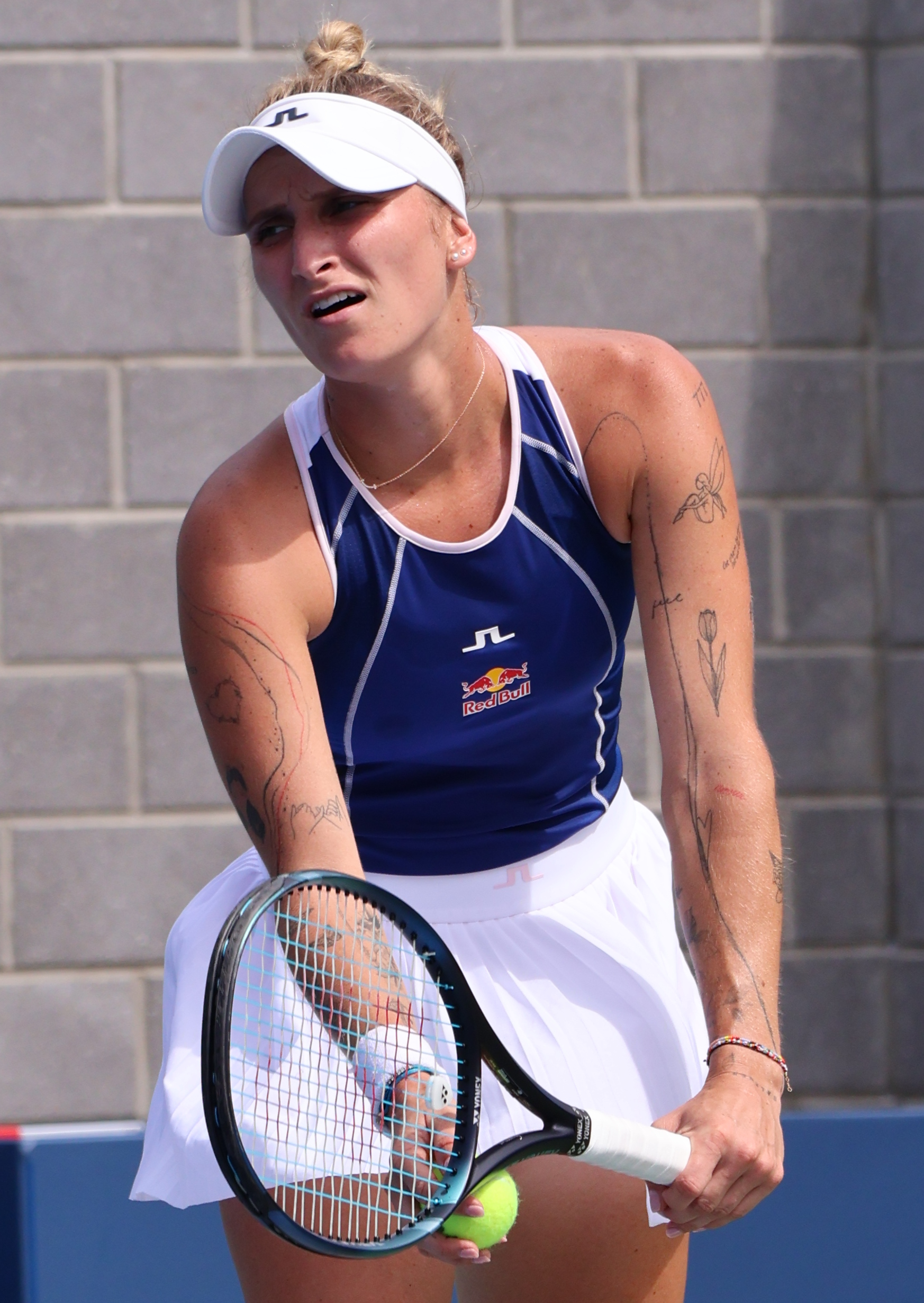
Vondroušová at the 2023 US Open

== Performance timelines ==
Key
W	F	SF	QF	#R	RR	Q#	P#	DNQ	A	Z#	PO	G	S	B	NMS	NTI	P	NH

(W) winner; (F) finalist; (SF) semifinalist; (QF) quarterfinalist; (#R) rounds 4, 3, 2, 1; (RR) round-robin stage; (Q#) qualification round; (P#) preliminary round; (DNQ) did not qualify; (A) absent; (Z#) Davis/Fed Cup Zonal Group (with number indication) or (PO) play-off; (G) gold, (S) silver or (B) bronze Olympic/Paralympic medal; (NMS) not a Masters tournament; (NTI) not a Tier I tournament; (P) postponed; (NH) not held; (SR) strike rate (events won / competed); (W–L) win–loss record.
To avoid confusion and double counting, these charts are updated at the conclusion of a tournament or when the player's participation has ended.

Only main-draw results in WTA Tour, Grand Slam tournaments, Billie Jean King Cup, Hopman Cup, United Cup and Olympic Games are included in win–loss records.

=== Singles ===
Current through the 2025 Tokyo Open.

Tournament	2016	2017	2018	2019	2020	2021	2022	2023	2024	2025	2026	SR	W–L	Win %
Grand Slam tournaments
Australian Open	A	A	2R	2R	1R	4R	3R	3R	1R	A	A	0 / 7	9–7	56%
French Open	A	2R	1R	F	1R	4R	A	2R	QF	3R	A	0 / 8	17–8	68%
Wimbledon	A	1R	1R	1R	NH	2R	A	W	1R	2R	A	1 / 7	9–6	60%
US Open	A	1R	4R	A	2R	2R	A	QF	A	QF (Note: Withdrew during the tournament. Not counted as a loss.)	A	0 / 5	13–5	72%
Win–loss	0–0	1–3	4–4	7–3	1–3	8–4	2–1	14–3	4–3	7–2	0–0	1 / 28	48–26	65%
Year-end championships
WTA Finals	Did Not Qualify				NH	DNQ		RR	Did Not Qualify			0 / 1	0–3	0%
WTA Elite Trophy (Note: WTA Tournament of Champions was held from 2009 to 2014, when WTA Elite Trophy replaced it.)	Did Not Qualify			A (Note: Qualified for 2019 WTA Elite Trophy, but decided to withdraw before tournament started.)	Not Held			A	Not Held			0 / 0	0–0	–
National representation
Summer Olympics	A	NH				S	Not Held		A	Not Held		0 / 1	5–1	83%
Billie Jean King Cup (Note: Formerly known as Fed Cup until 2020.)	A	SF	A	RR	RR (Note: Edition is split into two years due to COVID-19.)		SF	SF	A	A	А	0 / 5	9–2	82%
WTA 1000 tournaments
Qatar Open	A	NTI	2R	NTI	1R	NTI	A	NTI	3R	1R	A	0 / 4	2–4	33%
Dubai Championships	NTI	A	NTI	A	NTI	2R	NTI	1R	QF	2R	A	0 / 4	4–4	50%
Indian Wells Open	A	A	4R	QF	NH	1R	4R	4R	3R	A	A	0 / 6	13–5	72%
Miami Open	A	A	1R	QF	NH	4R	A	4R	A	A	A	0 / 4	9–4	69%
Madrid Open	A	A	A	A	NH	1R	A	2R	3R	A	A	0 / 3	2–3	40%
Italian Open	A	A	A	QF	SF	1R	A	4R	3R	A	A	0 / 5	11–5	69%
Canadian Open	A	A	A	A	NH	A	A	3R	A	2R	A	0 / 2	3–2	60%
Cincinnati Open	A	A	1R	A	1R	1R	A	QF	A	2R	A	0 / 5	4–5	44%
China Open	A	A	A	A	Not Held			1R	A	A	A	0 / 1	0–1	0%
Wuhan Open	A	A	1R	A	Not Held				A	A	A	0 / 1	0–1	0%
Win–Loss	0–0	0–0	4–5	11–3	4–3	3–6	2–1	15–8	6–4	3–4	0–0	0 / 35	48–34	59%
Career statistics
	2016	2017	2018	2019	2020	2021	2022	2023	2024	2025	2026	SR	W–L	Win %
Tournaments	1	7	16	9	10	20	6	16	12	12	2	Career total: 109		
Titles	0	1	0	0	0	0	0	1	0	1	0	Career total: 3		
Finals	0	1	0	3	0	1	0	1	0	1	0	Career total: 7		
Hard win–loss	0–0	6–2	9–9	13–4	4–7	29–12	9–4	23–14	5–4	10–8	1–1	1 / 69	109–65	63%
Clay win–loss	1–1	3–3	5–4	15–3	4–3	4–4	2–1	7–3	10–5	2–1	0–0	0 / 27	52–28	65%
Grass win–loss	0–0	0–2	0–3	1–2	NH	1–3	0–0	9–1	1–2	6–1	0–0	2 / 16	18–14	56%
Overall win–loss	1–1	9–7	14–16	29–9	8–10	34–19	11–5	39–18	16–11	18–10	1–1	3 / 109	180–107	63%
Win %	50%	56%	47%	76%	44%	64%	67%	68%	59%	64%	50%	Career total: 63%		
Year-end ranking (Note: 2015: WTA ranking–429.)	376	67	67	16	21	35	99	7	39	34		$10,806,179		

=== Doubles ===
Current through the 2024 Australian Open.

Tournament	2015	2016	2017	2018	2019	2020	2021	2022	2023	2024	SR	W–L	Win %
Grand Slam tournaments
Australian Open	A	A	A	1R	SF	1R	2R	2R	3R	A	0 / 6	8–6	57%
French Open	A	A	A	1R	2R	A	A	A	2R		0 / 3	2–3	50%
Wimbledon	A	A	QF	1R	A	NH	2R	A	3R		0 / 4	6–3	67%
US Open	A	A	1R	A	A	A	2R	A	3R		0 / 3	3–2	60%
Win–loss	0–0	0–0	3–2	0–3	5–2	0–1	3–3	1–1	7–2	0–0	0 / 16	19–14	59%
National representation
Summer Olympics	NH	A	Not Held				2R	Not Held			0 / 1	1–1	50%
WTA 1000 tournaments
Qatar Open	NTI	A	NTI	A	NTI	A	NTI	A	NTI		0 / 0	0–0	–
Dubai Championships	A	NTI	A	NTI	A	NTI	A	NTI	2R		0 / 1	1–1	50%
Indian Wells Open	A	A	A	A	A	NH	A	A	1R		0 / 1	0–1	0%
Miami Open	A	A	A	A	A	NH	A	A	A		0 / 0	0–0	–
Madrid Open	A	A	A	A	A	NH	A	A	A		0 / 0	0–0	–
Italian Open	A	A	A	A	A	A	F	A	2R		0 / 2	5–2	71%
Canadian Open	A	A	A	A	A	NH	A	A	2R		0 / 1	1–1	50%
Cincinnati Open	A	A	A	A	A	A	A	A	A		0 / 0	0–0	–
China Open	A	A	A	A	A	Not Held			A		0 / 0	0–0	–
Wuhan Open	A	A	A	A	A	Not Held					0 / 0	0–0	–
Career statistics
	2015	2016	2017	2018	2019	2020	2021	2022	2023	2024	SR	W–L	Win %
Tournaments	1	0	2	4	4	2	10	3	11	0 (Note: Hasn't played any WTA Tour-level tournament so far, except United Cup that is not counted as a played tournament but matches count.)	Career total: 37		
Titles	0	0	0	0	0	0	0	0	0	0	Career total: 0		
Finals	0	0	0	0	0	0	1	1	1	0	Career total: 3		
Overall win–loss	0–1	0–0	3–2	0–4	6–2	1–1	14–8	8–3	17–9	0–1	0 / 37	49–31	61%
Win %	0%	–	60%	0%	75%	50%	64%	67%	65%	0%	Career total: 61%		
Year-end ranking	386	–	155	634	100	600	65	119	44				

=== Mixed doubles ===
Tournament	2021	SR	W–L	Win%
Australian Open	A	0 / 0	0–0	0%
French Open	A	0 / 0	0–0	–
Wimbledon	2R	0 / 1	1–1	50%
US Open	A	0 / 0	0–0	–
Win–loss	0–0	0 / 1	1–1	50%

== Grand Slam tournament finals ==
=== Singles: 2 (1 title, 1 runner-up) ===
Result	Year	Tournament	Surface	Opponent	Score
Loss	2019	French Open	Clay	(Australia) Ashleigh Barty	1–6, 3–6
Win	2023	Wimbledon	Grass	(Tunisia) Ons Jabeur	6–4, 6–4

== Other significant finals ==
=== WTA 1000 tournaments ===
==== Doubles: 1 (runner-up) ====
Result	Year	Tournament	Surface	Partner	Opponents	Score
Loss	2021	Italian Open	Clay	(France) Kristina Mladenovic	(Canada) Sharon Fichman (Mexico) Giuliana Olmos	6–4, 5–7, [5–10]

=== Summer Olympics ===
==== Singles: 1 (silver medal) ====
Result	Year	Tournament	Surface	Opponent	Score
Silver	2021	Tokyo Olympics	Hard	(Switzerland) Belinda Bencic	5–7, 6–2, 3–6

== WTA Tour finals ==
=== Singles: 7 (3 titles, 4 runner-ups) ===
Legend Grand Slam (1–1) Olympics (0–1) WTA 500 (1–0) International (1–2)	Finals by surface Hard (1–2) Clay (0–2) Grass (2–0)	Finals by setting Outdoor (3–2) Indoor (0–2)

Result	W–L	Date	Tournament	Tier	Surface	Opponent	Score
Win	1–0	Apr 2017	Ladies Open Biel Bienne, Switzerland	International	Hard (i)	(Estonia) Anett Kontaveit	6–4, 7–6^{(8–6)}
Loss	1–1	Feb 2019	Hungarian Ladies Open, Hungary	International	Hard (i)	(Belgium) Alison Van Uytvanck	6–1, 5–7, 2–6
Loss	1–2	Apr 2019	İstanbul Cup, Turkey	International	Clay	(Croatia) Petra Martić	6–1, 4–6, 1–6
Loss	1–3	Jun 2019	French Open, France	Grand Slam	Clay	(Australia) Ashleigh Barty	1–6, 3–6
Loss	1–4	Jul 2021	Tokyo Olympics	Olympics	Hard	(Switzerland) Belinda Bencic	5–7, 6–2, 3–6
Win	2–4	Jul 2023	Wimbledon, United Kingdom	Grand Slam	Grass	(Tunisia) Ons Jabeur	6–4, 6–4
Win	3–4	Jun 2025	Berlin Ladies Open, Germany	WTA 500	Grass	(China) Wang Xinyu	7–6^{(12–10)}, 4–6, 6–2

=== Doubles: 3 (3 runner-ups) ===
Legend WTA 1000 (0–1) WTA 500 (0–1) WTA 250 (0–1)	Finals by surface Hard (0–1) Clay (0–1) Grass (0–1)	Finals by setting Outdoor (0–3)

Result	W–L	Date	Tournament	Tier	Surface	Partner	Opponents	Score
Loss	0–1	May 2021	Italian Open, Italy	WTA 1000	Clay	(France) Kristina Mladenovic	(Canada) Sharon Fichman (Mexico) Giuliana Olmos	6–4, 5–7, [5–10]
Loss	0–2	Jan 2022	Adelaide International, Australia	WTA 250	Hard	(Czech Republic) Tereza Martincová	(Japan) Eri Hozumi (Japan) Makoto Ninomiya	6–1, 6–7^{(4–7)}, [7–10]
Loss	0–3	Jun 2023	Berlin Ladies Open, Germany	WTA 500	Grass	(Czech Republic) Kateřina Siniaková	(Brazil) Luisa Stefani (France) Caroline Garcia	6–4, 6–7^{(8–10)}, [4–10]

== WTA 125 finals ==
=== Doubles: 1 (runner-up) ===
Result	Date	Tournament	Surface	Partner	Opponents	Score
Loss	Dec 2022	Open Angers, France	Hard (i)	(Czech Republic) Miriam Kolodziejová	(United States) Alycia Parks (China) Zhang Shuai	2–6, 2–6

== ITF Circuit finals ==
=== Singles: 11 (8 titles, 3 runner–ups) ===
Legend $100,000 tournaments (2–0) $80,000 tournaments (1–0) $25,000 tournaments (1–2) $10/15,000 tournaments (4–1)	Finals by surface Hard (3–3) Clay (5–0)

Result	W–L	Date	Tournament	Tier	Surface	Opponent	Score
Loss	0–1	Mar 2015	ITF Sharm El Sheikh, Egypt	10,000	Hard	(Belarus) Vera Lapko	5–7, 3–6
Win	1–1	May 2015	ITF Zielona Góra, Poland	10,000	Clay	(Russia) Natela Dzalamidze	6–3, 6–3
Win	2–1	Jun 2015	ITF Přerov, Czech Republic	15,000	Clay	(Russia) Ekaterina Alexandrova	6–1, 6–4
Win	3–1	Mar 2016	ITF Antalya, Turkey	10,000	Clay	(Switzerland) Lisa Sabino	6–2, 6–0
Win	4–1	Jan 2017	ITF Stuttgart, Germany	15,000	Hard (i)	(Germany) Anna Zaja	3–6, 6–2, 6–1
Win	5–1	Feb 2017	Open de l'Isère, France	25,000	Hard (i)	(Russia) Anna Blinkova	7–5, 6–4
Loss	5–2	Feb 2017	ITF Perth, Australia	25,000	Hard	(Czech Republic) Marie Bouzková	6–1, 3–6, 2–6
Loss	5–3	Mar 2017	ITF Clare, Australia	25,000	Hard	(Brazil) Beatriz Haddad Maia	2–6, 2–6
Win	6–3	May 2017	Empire Slovak Open, Slovakia	100,000	Clay	(Paraguay) Verónica Cepede Royg	7–5, 7–6^{(7–3)}
Win	7–3	Jul 2017	ITF Prague Open, Czech Republic	80,000	Clay	(Czech Republic) Karolína Muchová	7–5, 6–1
Win	8–3	Nov 2022	GB Pro-Series Shrewsbury, United Kingdom	100,000	Hard (i)	(Germany) Eva Lys	7–5, 6–2

=== Doubles: 8 (6 titles, 2 runner–ups) ===
Legend $100,000 tournaments (1–0) $75/80,000 tournaments (1–1) $10/15,000 tournaments (4–1)	Finals by surface Hard (4–0) Clay (2–2)

Result	W–L	Date	Tournament	Tier	Surface	Partner	Opponents	Score
Win	1–0	Mar 2015	ITF Sharm El Sheikh, Egypt	10,000	Hard	(Belarus) Vera Lapko	(Russia) Anna Morgina (Norway) Caroline Rohde-Moe	6–2, 6–4
Win	2–0	May 2015	ITF Zielona Góra, Poland	10,000	Clay	(Czech Republic) Miriam Kolodziejová	(Russia) Natela Dzalamidze (Russia) Margarita Lazareva	6–2, 6–2
Win	3–0	Jun 2015	ITF Přerov, Czech Republic	15,000	Clay	(Czech Republic) Miriam Kolodziejová	(Czech Republic) Martina Borecká (Czech Republic) Jesika Malečková	6–4, 6–1
Loss	3–1	Aug 2015	ITF Prague Open, Czech Republic	75,000	Clay	(Czech Republic) Miriam Kolodziejová	(Czech Republic) Kateřina Kramperová (United States) Bernarda Pera	6–7^{(4–7)}, 7–5, [1–10]
Loss	3–2	Mar 2016	ITF Antalya, Turkey	10,000	Clay	(Czech Republic) Natálie Novotná	(Russia) Olga Doroshina (Ukraine) Anastasiya Vasylyeva	2–6, 1–6
Win	4–2	Jan 2017	ITF Stuttgart, Germany	15,000	Hard (i)	(Czech Republic) Miriam Kolodziejová	(Bosnia and Herzegovina) Anita Husarić (Belgium) Kimberley Zimmermann	7–6^{(7–3)}, 7–5
Win	5–2	Oct 2022	Internationaux de Poitiers, France	80,000	Hard (i)	(Czech Republic) Miriam Kolodziejová	(France) Jessika Ponchet (Czech Republic) Renata Voráčová	6–4, 6–3
Win	6–2	Nov 2022	GB Pro-Series Shrewsbury, UK	100,000	Hard (i)	(Czech Republic) Miriam Kolodziejová	(France) Jessika Ponchet (Czech Republic) Renata Voráčová	7–6^{(7–4)}, 6–2

== Junior Grand Slam finals ==
=== Doubles: 3 (2 titles, 1 runner–up) ===
Result	Year	Tournament	Surface	Partner	Opponents	Score
Loss	2014	French Open	Clay	(United States) CiCi Bellis	(Romania) Ioana Ducu (Romania) Ioana Loredana Roșca	1–6, 7–5, [9–11]
Win	2015	Australian Open	Hard	(Czech Republic) Miriam Kolodziejová	(Germany) Katharina Hobgarski (Belgium) Greet Minnen	7–5, 6–4
Win	2015	French Open	Clay	(Czech Republic) Miriam Kolodziejová	(United States) Caroline Dolehide (United States) Katerina Stewart	6–0, 6–3

== WTA Tour career earnings ==
Current through the 2023 Canadian Open.

Year	Grand Slam singles titles	WTA singles titles	Total singles titles	Earnings ($)	Money list rank
2014	0	0	0	316	2014
2015	0	0	0	10,152	503
2016	0	0	0	9,902	536
2017	0	1	1	308,271	114
2018	0	0	0	634,374	60
2019	0	0	0	2,091,225	16
2020	0	0	0	422,782	50
2021	0	0	0	944,469	33
2022	0	0	0	358,712	133
2023	1	0	1	3,695,603	5
Career	1	1	2	8,482,396	80

== Career Grand Slam statistics ==
=== Seedings ===
The tournaments won by Vondroušová are in boldface, and advanced into finals by Vondroušová are in italics.

Year	Australian Open	French Open	Wimbledon	US Open
2017	did not play	qualifier	not seeded	not seeded
2018	not seeded	not seeded	not seeded	not seeded
2019	not seeded	not seeded (1)	16th	did not play
2020	15th	15th	cancelled	12th
2021	19th	20th	not seeded	not seeded
2022	31st	did not play	did not play	did not play
2023	protected ranking	not seeded	**not seeded (1)**	9th
2024	7th	5th	6th	did not play
2025	did not play	not seeded	not seeded	not seeded

=== Best Grand Slam results details ===
Grand Slam winners are in boldface, and runner–ups are in italics.

**Australian Open**
**2021 Australian Open (19th)**
Round	Opponent	Rank	Score
1R	(Sweden) Rebecca Peterson	55	2–6, 7–5, 7–5
2R	(Canada) Rebecca Marino (Q)	317	6–1, 7–5
3R	(Romania) Sorana Cîrstea	68	6–2, 6–4
4R	(Chinese Taipei) Hsieh Su-wei	71	4–6, 2–6

**Wimbledon Championships**
**2023 Wimbledon Championships (not seeded)**
Round	Opponent	Rank	Score
1R	(United States) Peyton Stearns	59	6–2, 7–5
2R	Veronika Kudermetova (12)	12	6–3, 6–3
3R	(Croatia) Donna Vekić (20)	21	6–2, 7–5
4R	(Czech Republic) Marie Bouzková (32)	33	2–6, 6–4, 6–3
QF	(United States) Jessica Pegula (4)	4	6–4, 2–6, 6–4
SF	(Ukraine) Elina Svitolina (WC)	76	6–3, 6–3
**W**	(Tunisia) Ons Jabeur (6)	6	6–4, 6–4

**French Open**
**2019 French Open (not seeded)**
Round	Opponent	Rank	Score
1R	(China) Wang Yafan	56	6–4, 6–3
2R	(Russia) Anastasia Potapova	81	6–4, 6–0
3R	(Spain) Carla Suárez Navarro (28)	29	6–4, 6–4
4R	(Latvia) Anastasija Sevastova (12)	12	6–2, 6–0
QF	(Croatia) Petra Martić (31)	31	7–6^{(7–1)}, 7–5
SF	(United Kingdom) Johanna Konta (26)	26	7–5, 7–6^{(7–2)}
F	(Australia) **Ashleigh Barty** (8)	8	1–6, 3–6

**US Open**
**2023 US Open (9th)**
Round	Opponent	Rank	Score
1R	(South Korea) Han Na-lae (Q)	241	6–3, 6–0
2R	(Italy) Martina Trevisan	58	6–2, 6–2
3R	(Russia) Ekaterina Alexandrova (22)	20	6–2, 6–1
4R	(United States) Peyton Stearns	59	6–7^{(3–7)}, 6–3, 6–2
QF	(United States) Madison Keys (17)	17	1–6, 4–6
**2025 US Open (not seeded)**
Round	Opponent	Rank	Score
1R	Oksana Selekhmeteva (Q)	163	6–3, 6–2
2R	(United States) McCartney Kessler (32)	41	7–6^{(9–7)}, 6–2
3R	(Italy) Jasmine Paolini (7)	8	7–6^{(7–4)}, 6–1
4R	(Kazakhstan) Elena Rybakina (9)	10	6–4, 5–7, 6–2
QF	**Aryna Sabalenka (1)**	**1**	w/o

== Record against other players ==
=== Wins against top 10 players ===
- Vondroušová has a 16–26 (38%) record against players who were, at the time the match was played, ranked in the top 10.

#	Opponent	Rk	Event	Surface	Rd	Score	Rk	Ref
2019
1.	(Romania) Simona Halep	2	Indian Wells Open, US	Hard	4R	6–2, 3–6, 6–2	61	
2.	(Romania) Simona Halep	2	Italian Open, Italy	Clay	2R	2–6, 7–5, 6–3	44	
2020
3.	(Ukraine) Elina Svitolina	6	Italian Open, Italy	Clay	QF	6–3, 6–0	19	
2021
4.	(Japan) Naomi Osaka	2	Tokyo Olympics, Japan	Hard	3R	6–1, 6–4	42	
5.	(Ukraine) Elina Svitolina	6	Tokyo Olympics, Japan	Hard	SF	6–3, 6–1	42	
2022
6.	(Estonia) Anett Kontaveit	5	Indian Wells Open, US	Hard	3R	3–6, 7–5, 7–6^{(7–5)}	33	
2023
7.	(Tunisia) Ons Jabeur	2	Australian Open, Australia	Hard	2R	6–1, 5–7, 6–1	86	
8.	(Tunisia) Ons Jabeur	4	Indian Wells Open, US	Hard	3R	7–6^{(7–5)}, 6–4	105	
9.	(Greece) Maria Sakkari	8	Italian Open, Italy	Clay	3R	7–5, 6–3	70	
10.	(United States) Jessica Pegula	4	Wimbledon, UK	Grass	QF	6–4, 2–6, 6–4	42	
11.	(Tunisia) Ons Jabeur	6	Wimbledon, UK	Grass	F	6–4, 6–4	42	
2024
12.	Aryna Sabalenka	2	Stuttgart Open, Germany	Clay (i)	QF	3–6, 6–3, 7–5	8	
2025
13.	(United States) Madison Keys	6	German Open, Germany	Grass	1R	7–5, 7–6^{(8–6)}	164	
14.	Aryna Sabalenka	1	German Open, Germany	Grass	SF	6–2, 6–4	164	
15.	(Italy) Jasmine Paolini	8	US Open, US	Hard	3R	7–6^{(7–4)}, 6–1	60	
16.	(Kazakhstan) Elena Rybakina	10	US Open, US	Hard	4R	6–4, 5–7, 6–2	60	

=== Double bagel matches ===
Result	Year	W–L	Tournament	Tier	Surface	Opponent	Rank	Rd	Rank
Win	2017	1–0	ITF Perth, Australia	25,000	Hard	(Australia) Nadia Rajan	n/a	Q1	315
Win	2020	2–0	Adelaide International, Australia	WTA 500	Hard	(Australia) Arina Rodionova	201	2R	16

== Longest winning streaks ==
=== 9-match winning streak in singles (2023) ===
#	Tournament	Category	Start date	Surface	Rd	Opponent	Rank	Score
–	German Open	WTA 500	19 June 2023	Grass	QF	(Greece) Maria Sakkari (6)	No. 8	6–7^{(7–9)}, 1–6
1	Wimbledon	Grand Slam	3 July 2023	Grass	1R	(United States) Peyton Stearns	No. 59	6–2, 7–5
2	Wimbledon	Grand Slam	3 July 2023	Grass	2R	Veronika Kudermetova (12)	No. 12	6–3, 6–3
3	Wimbledon	Grand Slam	3 July 2023	Grass	3R	(Croatia) Donna Vekić (20)	No. 21	6–1, 7–5
4	Wimbledon	Grand Slam	3 July 2023	Grass	4R	(Czech Republic) Marie Bouzková (32)	No. 33	2–6, 6–4, 6–3
5	Wimbledon	Grand Slam	3 July 2023	Grass	QF	(United States) Jessica Pegula (4)	No. 4	6–4, 2–6, 6–4
6	Wimbledon	Grand Slam	3 July 2023	Grass	SF	(Ukraine) Elina Svitolina (WC)	No. 76	6–3, 6–3
7	Wimbledon	Grand Slam	3 July 2023	Grass	F	(Tunisia) Ons Jabeur (6)	No. 6	6–4, 6–4
8	Canadian Open	WTA 1000	7 August 2023	Hard	1R	(Egypt) Mayar Sherif	No. 33	6–4, 6–2
9	Canadian Open	WTA 1000	7 August 2023	Hard	2R	(Denmark) Caroline Wozniacki (WC)	No. n/a	6–2, 7–5
–	Canadian Open	WTA 1000	7 August 2023	Hard	3R	(United States) Coco Gauff (6)	No. 7	3–6, 0–6
