= 2022 GB Pro-Series Shrewsbury – Doubles =

Doubles
- 2022 GB Pro-Series Shrewsbury

Final
- Champions: (Czech Republic) Miriam Kolodziejová (Czech Republic) Markéta Vondroušová
- Runners-up: (France) Jessika Ponchet (Czech Republic) Renata Voráčová
- Score: 7–6^{(7–4)}, 6–2

Events
Singles	Doubles
← 2019 ·	GB Pro-Series Shrewsbury	· 2023 →

Arina Rodionova and Yanina Wickmayer were the defending champions but they chose not to participate.

Miriam Kolodziejová and Markéta Vondroušová won the title, defeating Jessika Ponchet and Renata Voráčová in the final, 7–6^{(7–4)}, 6–2. This was Kolodziejová and Vondroušová's second consecutive title, following their title in Poitiers, where they defeated Ponchet and Voráčová to win the title.

== Seeds ==
1. (Romania) Monica Niculescu / (Romania) Elena-Gabriela Ruse (first round)
2. (Poland) Katarzyna Kawa / (Czech Republic) Jesika Malečková (semifinals)
3. (France) Jessika Ponchet / (Czech Republic) Renata Voráčová (final)
4. (Czech Republic) Miriam Kolodziejová / (Czech Republic) Markéta Vondroušová (champions)

== Draw ==
=== Key ===
- Q = Qualifier
- WC = Wild card
- LL = Lucky loser
- Alt = Alternate
- SE = Special exempt
- PR = Protected ranking
- ITF = ITF entry
- JE = Junior exempt
- w/o = Walkover
- r = Retired
- d = Defaulted
- SR = Special ranking

=== Draw ===
First round
1	(Romania) M Niculescu (Romania) E-G Ruse	7	1	[8]
(Uzbekistan) N Abduraimova (Poland) P Kania-Choduń	5	6	[10]
(France) E Jacquemot (Bulgaria) V Tomova	3	4
(United Kingdom) L John-Baptiste (United Kingdom) E Maloney	6	6
4	(Czech Republic) M Kolodziejová (Czech Republic) M Vondroušová	6	6
(South Korea) J-h Choi (Thailand) P Plipuech	4	2
(Romania) A Prisăcariu (Romania) A Vasilescu	4	5
(Czech Republic) G Knutson (Slovakia) K Strešnáková	6	7
(Japan) M Doi (Indonesia) B Gumulya	7^{7}	6
(United Kingdom) F Christie (United Kingdom) A Collins	6^{1}	3
WC	(United Kingdom) T Holmes (United Kingdom) S Yardley	1	0
3	(France) J Ponchet (Czech Republic) R Voráčová	6	6
(United Kingdom) E Appleton (United Kingdom) Y Miyazaki	6	3	[7]
(Chinese Taipei) J Garland (Latvia) Di Marcinkēviča	4	6	[10]
WC	(United Kingdom) S Anane (United Kingdom) J Matthews	7^{10}	0	[5]
2	(Poland) K Kawa (Czech Republic) J Malečková	6^{8}	6	[10]

Quarterfinals
(Uzbekistan) N Abduraimova (Poland) P Kania-Choduń	6	7
(United Kingdom) L John-Baptiste (United Kingdom) E Maloney	4	5
4	(Czech Republic) M Kolodziejová (Czech Republic) M Vondroušová	6	6
(Czech Republic) G Knutson (Slovakia) K Strešnáková	4	2
(Japan) M Doi (Indonesia) B Gumulya	6	2	[7]
3	(France) J Ponchet (Czech Republic) R Voráčová	3	6	[10]
(Chinese Taipei) J Garland (Latvia) Di Marcinkēviča	3	3
2	(Poland) K Kawa (Czech Republic) J Malečková	6	6

Semifinals
(Uzbekistan) N Abduraimova (Poland) P Kania-Choduń	3	6^{3}
4	(Czech Republic) M Kolodziejová (Czech Republic) M Vondroušová	6	7^{7}
3	(France) J Ponchet (Czech Republic) R Voráčová	4	6	[10]
2	(Poland) K Kawa (Czech Republic) J Malečková	6	2	[3]

Final
4	(Czech Republic) M Kolodziejová (Czech Republic) M Vondroušová	7^{7}	6
3	(France) J Ponchet (Czech Republic) R Voráčová	6^{4}	2
