= 2022 GB Pro-Series Shrewsbury – Singles =

Singles
- 2022 GB Pro-Series Shrewsbury

Final
- Champion: (Czech Republic) Markéta Vondroušová
- Runner-up: (Germany) Eva Lys
- Score: 7–5, 6–2

Events
Singles	Doubles
← 2019 ·	GB Pro-Series Shrewsbury	· 2023 →

Vitalia Diatchenko was the defending champion but she chose to compete in Nantes instead.

Markéta Vondroušová won the title, defeating Eva Lys in the final, 7–5, 6–2.

== Seeds ==
1. (Ukraine) Anhelina Kalinina (semifinals)
2. (Germany) Tatjana Maria (second round, retired)
3. (Hungary) Dalma Gálfi (first round)
4. (Bulgaria) Viktoriya Tomova (first round)
5. (Romania) Elena-Gabriela Ruse (first round)
6. (Switzerland) Simona Waltert (first round)
7. (Japan) Misaki Doi (second round)
8. (Czech Republic) Markéta Vondroušová (champion)

== Draw ==
=== Key ===
- Q = Qualifier
- WC = Wild card
- LL = Lucky loser
- Alt = Alternate
- SE = Special exempt
- PR = Protected ranking
- ITF = ITF entry
- JE = Junior exempt
- w/o = Walkover
- r = Retired
- d = Defaulted
- SR = Special ranking

=== Finals ===
Semifinals
1	(Ukraine) Anhelina Kalinina	6^{2}	3
8	(Czech Republic) Markéta Vondroušová	7^{7}	6
(Croatia) Ana Konjuh	5	2
(Germany) Eva Lys	7	6

Final
8	(Czech Republic) Markéta Vondroušová	7	6
(Germany) Eva Lys	5	2

=== Top half ===
First round
1	(Ukraine) A Kalinina	6	6
(France) E Jacquemot	4	1
Q	(United Kingdom) E McDonald	6^{7}	4
Q	(United Kingdom) F Christie	7^{9}	6
Q	(United Kingdom) E Maloney	6	6
WC	(United Kingdom) E Silva	2	3
(Uzbekistan) N Abduraimova	3	6	6^{2}
7	(Japan) M Doi	6	3	7^{7}
4	(Bulgaria) V Tomova	1	4
Q	(Czech Republic) B Palicová	6	6
JE	(Croatia) P Marčinko	4	3
(Czech Republic) K Muchová	6	6
Q	(Chinese Taipei) J Garland	4	6	2
Q	(United Kingdom) M Lumsden	6	3	6
(Sweden) M Björklund	2	1
8	(Czech Republic) M Vondroušová	6	6

Second round
1	(Ukraine) A Kalinina	3	6	7^{7}
Q	(United Kingdom) F Christie	6	4	6^{4}
Q	(United Kingdom) E Maloney	4	6	7^{7}
7	(Japan) M Doi	6	0	6^{3}
Q	(Czech Republic) B Palicová	6	6
(Czech Republic) K Muchová	3	2
Q	(United Kingdom) M Lumsden	3	3
8	(Czech Republic) M Vondroušová	6	6

Quarterfinals
1	(Ukraine) A Kalinina	7	6
Q	(United Kingdom) E Maloney	5	4
Q	(Czech Republic) B Palicová	6	4	1
8	(Czech Republic) M Vondroušová	4	6	6

Semifinals
1	(Ukraine) A Kalinina	6^{2}	3
8	(Czech Republic) M Vondroušová	7^{7}	6

=== Bottom half ===
First round
6	(Switzerland) S Waltert	6	4	1
Q	(Belgium) Y Wickmayer	4	6	6
(United Kingdom) K Boulter	6	6
(Bosnia and Herzegovina) N Berberović	4	4
(Poland) K Kawa	3	6	1
(United Kingdom) S Kartal	6	0	6
(Croatia) A Konjuh	6^{3}	7	7^{7}
3	(Hungary) D Gálfi	7^{7}	5	6^{3}
5	(Romania) E-G Ruse	1	3
(United Kingdom) J Burrage	6	6
(Germany) E Lys	6	6
WC	(United Kingdom) E Appleton	2	1
WC	(United Kingdom) Y Miyazaki	6	7
Q	(Czech Republic) G Knutson	4	5
WC	(United Kingdom) A Banks	3	6^{3}
2	(Germany) T Maria	6	7^{7}

Second round
Q	(Belgium) Y Wickmayer	5	5
(United Kingdom) K Boulter	7	7
(United Kingdom) S Kartal	6	6^{5}	5
(Croatia) A Konjuh	3	7^{7}	7
(United Kingdom) J Burrage	6	6^{2}	4
(Germany) E Lys	2	7^{7}	6
WC	(United Kingdom) Y Miyazaki	5	4
2	(Germany) T Maria	7	3^{r}

Quarterfinals
(United Kingdom) K Boulter	4	6^{5}
(Croatia) A Konjuh	6	7^{7}
(Germany) E Lys	6	1	6
WC	(United Kingdom) Y Miyazaki	0	6	0

Semifinals
(Croatia) A Konjuh	5	2
(Germany) E Lys	7	6
