= 2019 Engie Open Nantes Atlantique =

- Date: 28 October–3 November 2019
- Edition: 16th
- Category: ITF Women's World Tennis Tour
- Prize money: $60,000
- Surface: Hard / Indoor
- Location: Nantes, France

Champions

Singles
- (Spain) Cristina Bucșa

Doubles
- (Uzbekistan) Akgul Amanmuradova / (Georgia (country)) Ekaterine Gorgodze
← 2018 ·	Open Nantes Atlantique	· 2020 →

The 2019 Engie Open Nantes Atlantique was a professional tennis tournament played on indoor hard courts. It was the sixteenth edition of the tournament which was part of the 2019 ITF Women's World Tennis Tour. It took place in Nantes, France between 28 October and 3 November 2019.

== Singles main-draw entrants ==
=== Seeds ===
Country	Player	Rank^{1}	Seed
GER	Tatjana Maria	87	1
RUS	Varvara Gracheva	106	2
ESP	Aliona Bolsova	114	3
RUS	Vitalia Diatchenko	120	4
GER	Tamara Korpatsch	124	5
ROU	Ana Bogdan	136	6
FRA	Chloé Paquet	146	7
GEO	Ekaterine Gorgodze	200	8

- ^{1} Rankings are as of 21 October 2019.

=== Other entrants ===
The following players received wildcards into the singles main draw:

- (France) Sara Cakarevic
- (France) Irina Ramialison
- (France) Alice Tubello

The following player received entry using a protected ranking:

- (France) Océane Dodin

The following players received entry from the qualifying draw:

- (Uzbekistan) Akgul Amanmuradova
- (France) Mathilde Armitano
- (Spain) Lucía Cortez Llorca
- (France) Salma Djoubri
- (France) Théo Gravouil
- (Italy) Verena Meliss
- (France) Mallaurie Noël
- (Bulgaria) Julia Terziyska

The following player received entry as a lucky loser:

- (France) Elixane Lechemia

== Champions ==
=== Singles ===
- (Spain) Cristina Bucșa def. (Germany) Tamara Korpatsch, 6–2, 6–7^{(11–13)}, 7–6^{(8–6)}

=== Doubles ===
- (Uzbekistan) Akgul Amanmuradova / (Georgia (country)) Ekaterine Gorgodze def. (Germany) Vivian Heisen / (Russia) Yana Sizikova, 7–6^{(7–2)}, 6–3
