= 2021 Engie Open Nantes Atlantique – Singles =

Singles
- 2021 Engie Open Nantes Atlantique

Final
- Champion: (Ukraine) Anhelina Kalinina
- Runner-up: (France) Océane Dodin
- Score: 7–6^{(7–4)}, 1–0, ret.

Events
Singles	Doubles
← 2019 ·	Open Nantes Atlantique	· 2022 →

Cristina Bucșa was the defending champion but withdrew from the tournament.

Anhelina Kalinina won the title after Océane Dodin retired in the final at 7–6^{(7–4)}, 1–0.

== Seeds ==
1. (Ukraine) Anhelina Kalinina (champion)
2. (Russia) Varvara Gracheva (quarterfinals)
3. (France) Océane Dodin (final, retired)
4. (Italy) Martina Trevisan (semifinals)
5. (Russia) Kamilla Rakhimova (second round)
6. (Slovenia) Polona Hercog (first round)
7. (Russia) Vitalia Diatchenko (semifinals)
8. (China) Zheng Qinwen (first round)

== Draw ==
=== Key ===
- Q = Qualifier
- WC = Wild card
- LL = Lucky loser
- Alt = Alternate
- SE = Special exempt
- PR = Protected ranking
- ITF = ITF entry
- JE = Junior exempt
- w/o = Walkover
- r = Retired
- d = Defaulted
- SR = Special ranking

=== Finals ===
Semifinals
1	(Ukraine) Anhelina Kalinina	7^{7}	7^{8}
4	(Italy) Martina Trevisan	6^{3}	6^{6}
3	(France) Océane Dodin	6	6
7	(Russia) Vitalia Diatchenko	2	3

Final
1	(Ukraine) Anhelina Kalinina	7^{7}	1
3	(France) Océane Dodin	6^{4}	0^{r}

=== Top half ===
First round
1	(Ukraine) A Kalinina	6	6
PR	(India) K Thandi	3	3
Q	(Russia) E Andreeva	7^{7}	6
WC	(France) C Monnet	6^{5}	3
Q	(Cyprus) R Șerban	6	6^{5}	4
Q	(United Kingdom) SB Grey	4	7^{7}	6
(United Kingdom) S Murray Sharan	4	0^{r}
5	(Russia) K Rakhimova	6	0
4	(Italy) M Trevisan	6	6
Q	(France) S Cakarevic	0	3
(Ukraine) D Snigur	6	4
SE	(Switzerland) S Waltert	3	1^{r}
Q	(Turkey) İ Soylu	1^{r}
WC	(France) A Robbe	2
WC	(France) A Albié	7	6
8	(China) Q Zheng	5	3

Second round
1	(Ukraine) A Kalinina	6	6
Q	(Russia) E Andreeva	2	4
Q	(United Kingdom) SB Grey	6	6
5	(Russia) K Rakhimova	1	2
4	(Italy) M Trevisan	7^{7}	6
(Ukraine) D Snigur	6^{4}	4
WC	(France) A Robbe	6	3	6
WC	(France) A Albié	4	6	3

Quarterfinals
1	(Ukraine) A Kalinina	6	6
Q	(United Kingdom) SB Grey	0	4
4	(Italy) M Trevisan	6	3	6
WC	(France) A Robbe	3	6	1

Semifinals
1	(Ukraine) A Kalinina	7^{7}	7^{8}
4	(Italy) M Trevisan	6^{3}	6^{6}

=== Bottom half ===
First round
6	(Slovenia) P Hercog	3	4
(Poland) U Radwańska	6	6
(France) J Ponchet	2	4
(Netherlands) L Pattinama Kerkhove	6	6
LL	(Russia) E Yashina	2	5
WC	(France) M Noël	6	7
(France) C Paquet	4	7^{7}	6^{4}
3	(France) O Dodin	6	6^{2}	7^{7}
7	(Russia) V Diatchenko	6	6
(Australia) S Mendez	4	2
(India) A Raina	6	1	2
Q	(Burundi) S Nahimana	4	6	6
LL	(Latvia) D Marcinkēviča	0	5
Q	(Latvia) D Vismane	6	7
Q	(United States) E Bektas	5	5
2	(Russia) V Gracheva	7	7

Second round
(Poland) U Radwańska	3	4
(Netherlands) L Pattinama Kerkhove	6	6
WC	(France) M Noël	6^{6}	6	5
3	(France) O Dodin	7^{8}	4	7
7	(Russia) V Diatchenko	7	4	6
Q	(Burundi) S Nahimana	5	6	1
Q	(Latvia) D Vismane	6	5	4
2	(Russia) V Gracheva	4	7	6

Quarterfinals
(Netherlands) L Pattinama Kerkhove	6^{6}	3
3	(France) O Dodin	7^{8}	6
7	(Russia) V Diatchenko	6	3	6
2	(Russia) V Gracheva	1	6	3

Semifinals
3	(France) O Dodin	6	6
7	(Russia) V Diatchenko	2	3
