= 2022 Engie Open Nantes Atlantique – Doubles =

Doubles
- 2022 Engie Open Nantes Atlantique

Final
- Champions: (Belgium) Magali Kempen (Chinese Taipei) Wu Fang-hsien
- Runners-up: (Slovenia) Veronika Erjavec (United Kingdom) Emily Webley-Smith
- Score: 6–2, 6–4

Events
Singles	Doubles
← 2021 ·	Open Nantes Atlantique	· 2023 →

Samantha Murray Sharan and Jessika Ponchet were the defending champions but chose not to participate.

Magali Kempen and Wu Fang-hsien won the title defeating Veronika Erjavec and Emily Webley-Smith in the final, 6–2, 6–4.

== Seeds ==
1. Alena Fomina-Klotz / (Greece) Valentini Grammatikopoulou (quarterfinals)
2. (Slovenia) Veronika Erjavec / (United Kingdom) Emily Webley-Smith (final)
3. (Turkey) Berfu Cengiz / Anastasia Tikhonova (first round)
4. (Belgium) Magali Kempen / (Chinese Taipei) Wu Fang-hsien (champions)

== Draw ==
=== Key ===
- Q = Qualifier
- WC = Wild card
- LL = Lucky loser
- Alt = Alternate
- SE = Special exempt
- PR = Protected ranking
- ITF = ITF entry
- JE = Junior exempt
- w/o = Walkover
- r = Retired
- d = Defaulted
- SR = Special ranking

=== Draw ===
First round
E Kazionova (Bosnia and Herzegovina) A Wagner	6	6
(France) Y Bartashevich (France) L Nguyen Tan	2	4
4	(Belgium) M Kempen (Chinese Taipei) F-h Wu	6	6
(France) M Noël; M Timofeeva	0	3
(France) M Szostak (France) A Tubello	6	6
(France) A Cirotte (France) C Cirotte	1	3
(Spain) L Cortez Llorca (Romania) O Gavrilă	2	0
(Croatia) M Dražić; I Shymanovich	6	6
(Algeria) I Ibbou (France) Y Mansouri	5	6	[10]
3	(Turkey) B Cengiz; A Tikhonova	7	4	[6]
(France) A Monnot (France) M Villet	2	2
(Belgium) T Di Girolami (France) L Wargnier	6	6

Quarterfinals
1	A Fomina-Klotz (Greece) V Grammatikopoulou	4	2
E Kazionova (Bosnia and Herzegovina) A Wagner	6	6
4	(Belgium) M Kempen (Chinese Taipei) F-h Wu	6	6
(France) M Szostak (France) A Tubello	3	3
(Croatia) M Dražić; I Shymanovich	6	6
(Algeria) I Ibbou (France) Y Mansouri	4	3
(Belgium) T Di Girolami (France) L Wargnier	6	6^{5}	[6]
2	(Slovenia) V Erjavec (United Kingdom) E Webley-Smith	4	7^{7}	[10]

Semifinals
E Kazionova (Bosnia and Herzegovina) A Wagner	2	4
4	(Belgium) M Kempen (Chinese Taipei) F-h Wu	6	6
(Croatia) M Dražić; I Shymanovich	2	4
2	(Slovenia) V Erjavec (United Kingdom) E Webley-Smith	6	6

Final
4	(Belgium) M Kempen (Chinese Taipei) F-h Wu	6	6
2	(Slovenia) V Erjavec (United Kingdom) E Webley-Smith	2	4
