= 2023 Engie Open Nantes Atlantique – Singles =

Singles
- 2023 Engie Open Nantes Atlantique

Final
- Champion: (France) Océane Dodin
- Runner-up: (Czech Republic) Gabriela Knutson
- Score: 6–7^{(2–7)}, 6–3, 6–2

Events
Singles	Doubles
← 2022 ·	Open Nantes Atlantique	· 2024 →

Kamilla Rakhimova was the defending champion but chose not to participate.

Océane Dodin won the title, defeating Gabriela Knutson in the final, 6–7^{(2–7)}, 6–3, 6–2.

== Seeds ==
1. (France) Océane Dodin (champion)
2. (Japan) Mai Hontama (withdrew)
3. (France) Léolia Jeanjean (quarterfinals, retired)
4. Polina Kudermetova (quarterfinals)
5. (France) Jessika Ponchet (second round)
6. (Turkey) Zeynep Sönmez (second round)
7. (Switzerland) Simona Waltert (first round)
8. (France) Elsa Jacquemot (semifinals)
9. (Czech Republic) Gabriela Knutson (final)

== Draw ==
=== Key ===
- Q = Qualifier
- WC = Wild card
- LL = Lucky loser
- Alt = Alternate
- ITF = ITF entry
- PR = Protected ranking
- SR = Special ranking
- SE = Special exempt
- JE = Junior exempt
- JR = Junior Accelerator Programme entrant
- CO = College Accelerator Programme entrant
- NG = Next Gen Accelerator Program entrant
- w/o = Walkover
- r = Retired
- d = Defaulted

=== Finals ===
Semifinals
1	(France) Océane Dodin	6^{4}	7^{7}	6
8	(France) Elsa Jacquemot	7^{7}	6^{4}	1
(Philippines) Alex Eala	6	3	1
9	(Czech Republic) Gabriela Knutson	2	6	6

Final
1	(France) Océane Dodin	6^{2}	6	6
9	(Czech Republic) Gabriela Knutson	7^{7}	3	2

=== Top half ===
First round
1	(France) O Dodin	7^{7}	6
Q	(Ukraine) V Podrez	6^{5}	3
WC	(France) É Dartron	5	4
Q	(France) N Berecoechea	7	6
(France) H Tan	6	6
Q	(Netherlands) L Tran	3	1
Q	(France) M Léonard	6	6
7	(Switzerland) S Waltert	4	0
4	P Kudermetova	6	2	7
(Bulgaria) G Topalova	2	6	5
Q	(United Kingdom) E Appleton	4	6	6^{5}
LL	(United Kingdom) M Mutavdzic	6	4	7^{7}
WC	(France) T Lemaître	2	0^{r}
(France) A Albié	6	3
Q	(Australia) TN Smith	4	6^{5}
8	(France) E Jacquemot	6	7^{7}

Second round
1	(France) O Dodin	6	6
Q	(France) N Berecoechea	3	2
(France) H Tan	2	6	6
Q	(France) M Léonard	6	2	0
4	P Kudermetova	6^{4}	6	6
LL	(United Kingdom) M Mutavdzic	7^{7}	1	1
(France) A Albié	6	6^{4}	6^{1}
8	(France) E Jacquemot	3	7^{7}	7^{7}

Quarterfinals
1	(France) O Dodin	6	6
(France) H Tan	4	4
4	P Kudermetova	6^{2}	2
8	(France) E Jacquemot	7^{7}	6

Semifinals
1	(France) O Dodin	6^{4}	7^{7}	6
8	(France) E Jacquemot	7^{7}	6^{4}	1

=== Bottom half ===
First round
6	(Turkey) Z Sönmez	6	4	6
Q	(France) C Noël	3	6	2
(Philippines) A Eala	6	6
WC	(France) A Hesse	3	2
Q	(France) D Martynov	5	3
(Malta) F Curmi	7	6
E Reyngold	6	4	3
3	(France) L Jeanjean	4	6	6
5	(France) J Ponchet	6	6
(France) M Rouvroy	3	0
(United Kingdom) L Miyazaki	7^{7}	6
(France) A Robbe	6^{3}	0
JE	(Belgium) S Costoulas	2	7^{7}	4
(Serbia) N Stevanović	6	6^{4}	6
WC	(France) M Noël	1	4
9	(Czech Republic) G Knutson	6	6

Second round
6	(Turkey) Z Sönmez	6^{5}	4
(Philippines) A Eala	7^{7}	6
(Malta) F Curmi	4	6^{3}
3	(France) L Jeanjean	6	7^{7}
5	(France) J Ponchet	6	4	6^{6}
(United Kingdom) L Miyazaki	3	6	7^{8}
(Serbia) N Stevanović	6	2	5
9	(Czech Republic) G Knutson	2	6	7

Quarterfinals
(Philippines) A Eala	6	2
3	(France) L Jeanjean	4	0^{r}
(United Kingdom) L Miyazaki	7^{7}	4	1
9	(Czech Republic) G Knutson	6^{5}	6	6

Semifinals
(Philippines) A Eala	6	3	1
(Czech Republic) G Knutson	2	6	6
