= 2022 Engie Open Nantes Atlantique =

Tennis tournament

- Date: 31 October–6 November 2022
- Edition: 18th
- Category: ITF Women's World Tennis Tour
- Prize money: $60,000
- Surface: Hard / Indoor
- Location: Nantes, France

Champions

Singles
- Kamilla Rakhimova

Doubles
- (Belgium) Magali Kempen / (Chinese Taipei) Wu Fang-hsien
← 2021 ·	Open Nantes Atlantique	· 2023 →

The 2022 Engie Open Nantes Atlantique is a professional tennis tournament played on indoor hard courts. It is the eighteenth edition of the tournament which is part of the 2022 ITF Women's World Tennis Tour. It takes place in Nantes, France between 31 October and 6 November 2022.

== Champions ==
=== Singles ===
- Kamilla Rakhimova def. (China) Wang Xinyu, 6–4, 6–4.

=== Doubles ===
- (Belgium) Magali Kempen / (Chinese Taipei) Wu Fang-hsien def. (Slovenia) Veronika Erjavec / (United Kingdom) Emily Webley-Smith, 6–2, 6–4

== Singles main draw entrants ==
=== Seeds ===
Country	Player	Rank^{1}	Seed
GER	Tamara Korpatsch	90	1
FRA	Océane Dodin	95	2
	Kamilla Rakhimova	100	3
CHN	Wang Xinyu	101	4
~~BEL~~	~~Ysaline Bonaventure~~	~~105~~	~~5~~
	Vitalia Diatchenko	107	6
UKR	Daria Snigur	115	7
DEN	Clara Tauson	140	8

- ^{1} Rankings are as of 24 October 2022.

=== Other entrants ===
The following players received wildcards into the singles main draw:

- (France) Yaroslava Bartashevich
- (France) Lucie Nguyen Tan
- (France) Chloé Noël
- (France) Margaux Rouvroy

The following players received entry from the qualifying draw:

- (Turkey) Berfu Cengiz
- (France) Astrid Cirotte
- (Slovenia) Veronika Erjavec
- (Algeria) Inès Ibbou
- (South Africa) Isabella Kruger
- (France) Emma Léné
- Maria Timofeeva
- (France) Alice Tubello

The following player received entry as a lucky loser:

- (France) Yasmine Mansouri
