= 2019 GB Pro-Series Shrewsbury =

- Date: 11–17 February 2019
- Edition: 12th
- Category: ITF Women's World Tennis Tour
- Prize money: $60,000
- Surface: Hard / Indoor
- Location: Shrewsbury, United Kingdom

Champions

Singles
- (Russia) Vitalia Diatchenko

Doubles
- (Australia) Arina Rodionova / (Belgium) Yanina Wickmayer
← 2018 ·	GB Pro-Series Shrewsbury	· 2022 →

The 2019 GB Pro-Series Shrewsbury was a professional tennis tournament played on indoor hard courts. It was the twelfth edition of the tournament which was part of the 2019 ITF Women's World Tennis Tour. It took place in Shrewsbury, United Kingdom between 11 and 17 February 2019.

== Singles main-draw entrants ==
=== Seeds ===
Country	Player	Rank^{1}	Seed
BEL	Yanina Wickmayer	127	1
RUS	Vitalia Diatchenko	128	2
CZE	Tereza Smitková	137	3
GEO	Ekaterine Gorgodze	151	4
ESP	Aliona Bolsova Zadoinov	152	5
AUS	Arina Rodionova	159	6
NED	Bibiane Schoofs	162	7
LIE	Kathinka von Deichmann	165	8

- ^{1} Rankings are as of 4 February 2019.

=== Other entrants ===
The following players received wildcards into the singles main draw:

- (United Kingdom) Naomi Broady
- (United Kingdom) Freya Christie
- (United Kingdom) Francesca Jones
- (United Kingdom) Maia Lumsden

The following player received entry using a protected ranking:

- (North Macedonia) Lina Gjorcheska

The following player received entry from a special exempt:

- (France) Harmony Tan

The following players received entry from the qualifying draw:

- (United Kingdom) Jodie Anna Burrage
- (Norway) Ulrikke Eikeri
- (France) Amandine Hesse
- (France) Jessika Ponchet
- (France) Shérazad Reix
- (Belgium) Kimberley Zimmermann

The following players received entry as lucky losers:

- (France) Myrtille Georges
- (United Kingdom) Laura Robson

== Champions ==
=== Singles ===
- (Russia) Vitalia Diatchenko def. (Belgium) Yanina Wickmayer, 5–7, 6–1, 6–4

=== Doubles ===
- (Australia) Arina Rodionova / (Belgium) Yanina Wickmayer def. (United Kingdom) Freya Christie / (Russia) Valeria Savinykh, 6–2, 7–5
