= 2022 GB Pro-Series Shrewsbury =

Tennis tournament

- Date: 31 October–6 November 2022
- Edition: 13th
- Category: ITF Women's World Tennis Tour
- Prize money: $100,000
- Surface: Hard / Indoor
- Location: Shrewsbury, United Kingdom

Champions

Singles
- (Czech Republic) Markéta Vondroušová

Doubles
- (Czech Republic) Miriam Kolodziejová / (Czech Republic) Markéta Vondroušová
← 2019 ·	GB Pro-Series Shrewsbury	· 2023 →

The 2022 GB Pro-Series Shrewsbury was a professional tennis tournament played on indoor hard courts. It was the thirteenth edition of the tournament which was part of the 2022 ITF Women's World Tennis Tour. It took place in Shrewsbury, United Kingdom between 31 October and 6 November 2022.

== Champions ==
=== Singles ===
- (Czech Republic) Markéta Vondroušová def. (Germany) Eva Lys, 7–5, 6–2.

=== Doubles ===
- (Czech Republic) Miriam Kolodziejová / (Czech Republic) Markéta Vondroušová def. (France) Jessika Ponchet / (Czech Republic) Renata Voráčová, 7–6^{(7–4)}, 6–2.

== Singles main draw entrants ==
=== Seeds ===
Country	Player	Rank^{1}	Seed
UKR	Anhelina Kalinina	47	1
GER	Tatjana Maria	70	2
HUN	Dalma Gálfi	84	3
BUL	Viktoriya Tomova	92	4
ROU	Elena-Gabriela Ruse	96	5
SUI	Simona Waltert	112	6
JPN	Misaki Doi	116	7
CZE	Markéta Vondroušová	124	8

- ^{1} Rankings are as of 24 October 2022.

=== Other entrants ===
The following players received wildcards into the singles main draw:

- (United Kingdom) Emily Appleton
- (United Kingdom) Amarni Banks
- (United Kingdom) Yuriko Miyazaki
- (United Kingdom) Eden Silva

The following player received entry into the singles main draw using a junior exempt:

- (Croatia) Petra Marčinko

The following players received entry from the qualifying draw:

- (United Kingdom) Freya Christie
- (Chinese Taipei) Joanna Garland
- (Czech Republic) Gabriela Knutson
- (United Kingdom) Maia Lumsden
- (United Kingdom) Eliz Maloney
- (United Kingdom) Ella McDonald
- (Czech Republic) Barbora Palicová
- (Belgium) Yanina Wickmayer
