= 2019 GB Pro-Series Shrewsbury – Doubles =

Doubles
- 2019 GB Pro-Series Shrewsbury

Final
- Champions: (Australia) Arina Rodionova (Belgium) Yanina Wickmayer
- Runners-up: (United Kingdom) Freya Christie (Russia) Valeria Savinykh
- Score: 6–2, 7–5

Events
Singles	Doubles
← 2018 ·	GB Pro-Series Shrewsbury	· 2022 →

Sarah Beth Grey and Olivia Nicholls were the defending champions, but chose not to participate.

Arina Rodionova and Yanina Wickmayer won the title, defeating Freya Christie and Valeria Savinykh in the final, 6–2, 7–5.

== Seeds ==
1. (Netherlands) Lesley Kerkhove / (Australia) Jessica Moore (quarterfinals)
2. (Australia) Arina Rodionova / (Belgium) Yanina Wickmayer (champions)
3. (Norway) Ulrikke Eikeri / (Montenegro) Danka Kovinić (first round)
4. (Netherlands) Bibiane Schoofs / (Cyprus) Raluca Șerban (quarterfinals)

== Draw ==
=== Key ===
- Q = Qualifier
- WC = Wild card
- LL = Lucky loser
- Alt = Alternate
- SE = Special exempt
- PR = Protected ranking
- ITF = ITF entry
- JE = Junior exempt
- w/o = Walkover
- r = Retired
- d = Defaulted
- SR = Special ranking

=== Draw ===
First round
1	(Netherlands) L Kerkhove (Australia) J Moore	w/o
WC	(United Kingdom) M Lumsden (France) H Tan
WC	(United Kingdom) A Pitak (United Kingdom) K Pitak	3	3
(Sweden) C Lister (Germany) A Lottner	6	6
4	(Netherlands) B Schoofs (Cyprus) R Șerban	6	2	[10]
Alt	(Spain) C Bucșa (Bulgaria) J Terziyska	3	6	[7]
(United Kingdom) F Christie (Russia) V Savinykh	6	7^{7}
(Venezuela) A Gámiz (Venezuela) A Uzcátegui	4	6^{4}
(United Kingdom) N Broady (Australia) S Sanders	7^{7}	6
(France) M Georges (France) E Lechemia	6^{4}	3
(Canada) S Fichman (United States) M Sanchez	6	6
3	(Norway) U Eikeri (Montenegro) D Kovinić	4	1
(Croatia) J Fett (New Zealand) E Routliffe	6	6
(Czech Republic) T Smitková (Czech Republic) R Voráčová	3	2
(Italy) A Grymalska (Italy) G Marchetti	3	1
2	(Australia) Ar Rodionova (Belgium) Y Wickmayer	6	6

Quarterfinals
1	(Netherlands) L Kerkhove (Australia) J Moore	6^{6}	6	[8]
(Sweden) C Lister (Germany) A Lottner	7^{8}	4	[10]
4	(Netherlands) B Schoofs (Cyprus) R Șerban	3	6	[9]
(United Kingdom) F Christie (Russia) V Savinykh	6	3	[11]
(United Kingdom) N Broady (Australia) S Sanders	6^{4}	1
(Canada) S Fichman (United States) M Sanchez	7^{7}	6
(Croatia) J Fett (New Zealand) E Routliffe	6	2	[7]
2	(Australia) Ar Rodionova (Belgium) Y Wickmayer	2	6	[10]

Semifinals
(Sweden) C Lister (Germany) A Lottner	1	3
(United Kingdom) F Christie (Russia) V Savinykh	6	6
(Canada) S Fichman (United States) M Sanchez	3	3
2	(Australia) Ar Rodionova (Belgium) Y Wickmayer	6	6

Final
(United Kingdom) F Christie (Russia) V Savinykh	2	5
2	(Australia) Ar Rodionova (Belgium) Y Wickmayer	6	7
