= 2019 GB Pro-Series Shrewsbury – Singles =

Singles
- 2019 GB Pro-Series Shrewsbury

Final
- Champion: (Russia) Vitalia Diatchenko
- Runner-up: (Belgium) Yanina Wickmayer
- Score: 5–7, 6–1, 6–4

Events
Singles	Doubles
← 2018 ·	GB Pro-Series Shrewsbury	· 2022 →

Maia Lumsden was the defending champion, but lost to Yanina Wickmayer in the quarterfinals.

Vitalia Diatchenko won the title, defeating Wickmayer in the final, 5–7, 6–1, 6–4.

== Seeds ==
1. (Belgium) Yanina Wickmayer (final)
2. (Russia) Vitalia Diatchenko (champion)
3. (Czech Republic) Tereza Smitková (quarterfinals)
4. (Georgia (country)) Ekaterine Gorgodze (first round)
5. (Spain) Aliona Bolsova Zadoinov (semifinals, retired)
6. (Australia) Arina Rodionova (second round)
7. (Netherlands) Bibiane Schoofs (second round)
8. (Liechtenstein) Kathinka von Deichmann (second round)

== Draw ==
=== Key ===
- Q = Qualifier
- WC = Wild card
- LL = Lucky loser
- Alt = Alternate
- SE = Special exempt
- PR = Protected ranking
- ITF = ITF entry
- JE = Junior exempt
- w/o = Walkover
- r = Retired
- d = Defaulted
- SR = Special ranking

=== Finals ===
Semifinals
1	(Belgium) Yanina Wickmayer	7	6
SE	(France) Harmony Tan	5	4
5	(Spain) Aliona Bolsova Zadoinov	3^{r}
2	(Russia) Vitalia Diatchenko	3

Final
1	(Belgium) Yanina Wickmayer	7	1	4
2	(Russia) Vitalia Diatchenko	5	6	6

=== Top half ===
First round
1	(Belgium) Y Wickmayer	6	6
(Netherlands) L Kerkhove	2	1
Q	(France) J Ponchet	0	6	6
(Montenegro) D Kovinić	6	0	3
(Italy) A Grymalska	5	6	1
WC	(United Kingdom) M Lumsden	7	4	6
LL	(United Kingdom) L Robson	7^{7}	6^{8}	0
8	(Liechtenstein) K von Deichmann	6^{4}	7^{10}	6
3	(Czech Republic) T Smitková	6	6
Q	(France) S Reix	3	1
Q	(United Kingdom) JA Burrage	6	4
(Greece) V Grammatikopoulou	3	0^{r}
SE	(France) H Tan	7^{7}	4
(Slovenia) K Juvan	6^{1}	3^{r}
(Spain) O Sáez Larra	6	3	1
7	(Netherlands) B Schoofs	4	6	6

Second round
1	(Belgium) Y Wickmayer	6	6
Q	(France) J Ponchet	2	3
WC	(United Kingdom) M Lumsden	6	6
8	(Liechtenstein) K von Deichmann	3	4
3	(Czech Republic) T Smitková	6	6
Q	(United Kingdom) JA Burrage	4	1
SE	(France) H Tan	6	6
7	(Netherlands) B Schoofs	4	1

Quarterfinals
1	(Belgium) Y Wickmayer	6	6
WC	(United Kingdom) M Lumsden	3	3
3	(Czech Republic) T Smitková	1	0
SE	(France) H Tan	6	6

Semifinals
1	(Belgium) Y Wickmayer	7	6
SE	(France) H Tan	5	4

=== Bottom half ===
First round
5	(Spain) A Bolsova Zadoinov	6	6
WC	(United Kingdom) F Jones	3	0
WC	(United Kingdom) N Broady	4	3
(Cyprus) R Șerban	6	6
PR	(North Macedonia) L Gjorcheska	6	3	1
Q	(France) A Hesse	2	6	6
Q	(Norway) U Eikeri	7^{7}	6
4	(Georgia (country)) E Gorgodze	6^{2}	3
6	(Australia) Ar Rodionova	1	7^{7}	6
(Germany) A Lottner	6	6^{4}	4
Q	(Belgium) K Zimmermann	6	1	7^{10}
(Croatia) J Fett	4	6	6^{8}
LL	(France) M Georges	6	6
WC	(United Kingdom) F Christie	4	2
(Italy) M Di Giuseppe	1	0
2	(Russia) V Diatchenko	6	6

Second round
5	(Spain) A Bolsova Zadoinov	6	6
(Cyprus) R Șerban	2	0
Q	(France) A Hesse	6	6
Q	(Norway) U Eikeri	3	1
6	(Australia) Ar Rodionova	4	0
Q	(Belgium) K Zimmermann	6	6
LL	(France) M Georges	2	0
2	(Russia) V Diatchenko	6	6

Quarterfinals
5	(Spain) A Bolsova Zadoinov	6	7
Q	(France) A Hesse	1	5
Q	(Belgium) K Zimmermann	1	3
2	(Russia) V Diatchenko	6	6

Semifinals
5	(Spain) A Bolsova Zadoinov	3^{r}
2	(Russia) V Diatchenko	3
