= 2021 Engie Open Nantes Atlantique =

Tennis tournament

- Date: 1–7 November 2021
- Edition: 17th
- Category: ITF Women's World Tennis Tour
- Prize money: $60,000
- Surface: Hard / Indoor
- Location: Nantes, France

Champions

Singles
- (Ukraine) Anhelina Kalinina

Doubles
- (United Kingdom) Samantha Murray Sharan / (France) Jessika Ponchet
- Open Nantes Atlantique

The 2021 Engie Open Nantes Atlantique was a professional women's tennis tournament played on indoor hard courts. It was the seventeenth edition of the tournament which was part of the 2021 ITF Women's World Tennis Tour. It took place in Nantes, France between 1 and 7 November 2021.

== Singles main-draw entrants ==
=== Seeds ===
Country	Player	Rank^{1}	Seed
UKR	Anhelina Kalinina	59	1
RUS	Varvara Gracheva	81	2
FRA	Océane Dodin	93	3
ITA	Martina Trevisan	113	4
RUS	Kamilla Rakhimova	118	5
SLO	Polona Hercog	124	6
RUS	Vitalia Diatchenko	135	7
CHN	Zheng Qinwen	151	8

- ^{1} Rankings are as of 25 October 2021.

=== Other entrants ===
The following players received wildcards into the singles main draw:

- (France) Audrey Albié
- (France) Carole Monnet
- (France) Mallaurie Noël
- (France) Alice Robbe

The following player received entry using a protected ranking:

- (India) Karman Thandi

The following player received entry as a special exempt:

- (Switzerland) Simona Waltert

The following players received entry from the qualifying draw:

- (Russia) Erika Andreeva
- (United States) Emina Bektas
- (France) Sara Cakarevic
- (United Kingdom) Sarah Beth Grey
- (Burundi) Sada Nahimana
- (Turkey) İpek Soylu
- (Cyprus) Raluca Șerban
- (Latvia) Daniela Vismane

The following players received entry as lucky losers:

- (Latvia) Diāna Marcinkēviča
- (Russia) Ekaterina Yashina

== Champions ==
=== Singles ===
- (Ukraine) Anhelina Kalinina def. (France) Océane Dodin, 7–6^{(7–4)}, 1–0, ret.

=== Doubles ===
- (United Kingdom) Samantha Murray Sharan / (France) Jessika Ponchet def. (United Kingdom) Alicia Barnett / (United Kingdom) Olivia Nicholls, 6–4, 6–2
