= 2019 Engie Open Nantes Atlantique – Doubles =

Doubles
- 2019 Engie Open Nantes Atlantique

Final
- Champions: (Uzbekistan) Akgul Amanmuradova (Georgia (country)) Ekaterine Gorgodze
- Runners-up: (Germany) Vivian Heisen (Russia) Yana Sizikova
- Score: 7–6^{(7–2)}, 6–3

Events
Singles	Doubles
- Open Nantes Atlantique

Estelle Cascino and Elixane Lechemia were the defending champions, but lost in the semifinals to Akgul Amanmuradova and Ekaterine Gorgodze.

Amanmuradova and Gorgodze went on to win the title, defeating Vivian Heisen and Yana Sizikova in the final, 7–6^{(7–2)}, 6–3.

== Seeds ==
1. (Germany) Vivian Heisen / (Russia) Yana Sizikova (final)
2. (France) Estelle Cascino / (France) Elixane Lechemia (semifinals)
3. (Russia) Alena Fomina / (Russia) Ekaterina Yashina (quarterfinals)
4. (Uzbekistan) Akgul Amanmuradova / (Georgia (country)) Ekaterine Gorgodze (champions)

== Draw ==
Key

- Q = Qualifier
- WC = Wild card
- LL = Lucky loser
- Alt = Alternate
- ITF = ITF entry
- PR = Protected ranking
- SR = Special ranking
- SE = Special exempt
- JE = Junior exempt
- JR = Junior Accelerator Programme entrant
- CO = College Accelerator Programme entrant
- NG = Next Gen Accelerator Program entrant
- w/o = Walkover
- r = Retired
- d = Defaulted

=== Draw ===
First round
(Slovakia) V Juhászová (Bulgaria) J Terziyska	6	6
(France) M Noël (France) I Ramialison	1	2
(France) I Ekani (France) M Georges	1	6	[10]
(Latvia) D Marcinkēviča (Belgium) L Salden	6	3	[6]
(Spain) C Bucșa (Russia) E Ovcharenko	6	4	[4]
(France) L Bencheikh (France) A Tubello	3	6	[10]
(France) M Halemai (France) M Léonard	4	0
4	(Uzbekistan) A Amanmuradova (Georgia (country)) E Gorgodze	6	6
(France) L Adler (France) M Armitano	4	3
(Spain) L Cortez Llorca (Bolivia) N Zeballos	6	6

Quarterfinals
1	(Germany) V Heisen (Russia) Y Sizikova	6	6
(Slovakia) V Juhászová (Bulgaria) J Terziyska	4	0
3	(Russia) A Fomina (Russia) E Yashina	6	4	[6]
(France) I Ekani (France) M Georges	2	6	[10]
(France) L Bencheikh (France) A Tubello	5	3
4	(Uzbekistan) A Amanmuradova (Georgia (country)) E Gorgodze	7	6
(Spain) L Cortez Llorca (Bolivia) N Zeballos	1	3
2	(France) E Cascino (France) E Lechemia	6	6

Semifinals
1	(Germany) V Heisen (Russia) Y Sizikova	7^{7}	6
(France) I Ekani (France) M Georges	6^{2}	4
4	(Uzbekistan) A Amanmuradova (Georgia (country)) E Gorgodze	7^{7}	6
2	(France) E Cascino (France) E Lechemia	6^{3}	4

Final
1	(Germany) V Heisen (Russia) Y Sizikova	6^{2}	3
4	(Uzbekistan) A Amanmuradova (Georgia (country)) E Gorgodze	7^{7}	6
