= 2019 Engie Open Nantes Atlantique – Singles =

Singles
- 2019 Engie Open Nantes Atlantique

Final
- Champion: (Spain) Cristina Bucșa
- Runner-up: (Germany) Tamara Korpatsch
- Score: 6–2, 6–7^{(11–13)}, 7–6^{(8–6)}

Events
Singles	Doubles
← 2018 ·	Open Nantes Atlantique	· 2020 →

Timea Bacsinszky was the defending champion, but chose not to participate.

Cristina Bucșa won the title, defeating Tamara Korpatsch in the final, 6–2, 6–7^{(11–13)}, 7–6^{(8–6)}.

== Seeds ==
1. (Germany) Tatjana Maria (quarterfinals, retired)
2. (Russia) Varvara Gracheva (first round)
3. (Spain) Aliona Bolsova (first round)
4. (Russia) Vitalia Diatchenko (quarterfinals)
5. (Germany) Tamara Korpatsch (final)
6. (Romania) Ana Bogdan (semifinals)
7. (France) Chloé Paquet (first round)
8. (Georgia (country)) Ekaterine Gorgodze (second round)

== Draw ==
=== Key ===
- Q = Qualifier
- WC = Wild card
- LL = Lucky loser
- Alt = Alternate
- SE = Special exempt
- PR = Protected ranking
- ITF = ITF entry
- JE = Junior exempt
- w/o = Walkover
- r = Retired
- d = Defaulted
- SR = Special ranking

=== Finals ===
Semifinals
(Spain) Cristina Bucșa	6	6
(Italy) Martina Caregaro	2	1
6	(Romania) Ana Bogdan	6	3	3
5	(Germany) Tamara Korpatsch	0	6	6

Final
(Spain) Cristina Bucșa	6	6^{11}	7^{8}
5	(Germany) Tamara Korpatsch	2	7^{13}	6^{6}

=== Top half ===
First round
1	(Germany) T Maria	6	6
Q	(Bulgaria) J Terziyska	3	4
(Belgium) L Salden	6	6
(Spain) O Sáez Larra	2	2
Q	(France) T Gravouil	4	4
(Spain) C Bucșa	6	6
WC	(France) S Cakarevic	6	4	5
8	(Georgia (country)) E Gorgodze	4	6	7
3	(Spain) A Bolsova	5	1
(Italy) M Caregaro	7	6
(Germany) V Heisen	6	6
Q	(Italy) V Meliss	4	4
(France) A Albié	6	6
Q	(Spain) L Cortez Llorca	4	2
Q	(France) M Noël	6	6
7	(France) C Paquet	3	4

Second round
1	(Germany) T Maria	6	6^{2}	6
(Belgium) L Salden	3	7^{7}	1
(Spain) C Bucșa	6	6
8	(Georgia (country)) E Gorgodze	4	2
(Italy) M Caregaro	6	6
(Germany) V Heisen	0	2
(France) A Albié	6	6
Q	(France) M Noël	3	1

Quarterfinals
1	(Germany) T Maria	4	0^{r}
(Spain) C Bucșa	6	3
(Italy) M Caregaro	7^{7}	5	7^{8}
(France) A Albié	6^{5}	7	6^{6}

Semifinals
(Spain) C Bucșa	6	6
(Italy) M Caregaro	2	1

=== Bottom half ===
First round
6	(Romania) A Bogdan	6^{1}	6	6
(France) M Georges	7^{7}	2	4
LL	(France) E Lechemia	4	2
PR	(France) O Dodin	6	6
Q	(France) S Djoubri	2	3
(Czech Republic) J Malečková	6	6
(Latvia) D Marcinkēviča	2	2
4	(Russia) V Diatchenko	6	6
5	(Germany) T Korpatsch	6	6
WC	(France) A Tubello	3	4
Q	(France) M Armitano	7^{9}	6^{6}	3
Q	(Uzbekistan) A Amanmuradova	6^{7}	7^{8}	6
(France) M Yerolymos	4	5
WC	(France) I Ramialison	6	7
(France) A Hesse	6	7^{7}
2	(Russia) V Gracheva	3	6^{4}

Second round
6	(Romania) A Bogdan	7^{7}	3	6
(France) O Dodin	6^{3}	6	2
(Czech Republic) J Malečková	2	1
4	(Russia) V Diatchenko	6	6
5	(Germany) T Korpatsch	6	6
Q	(Uzbekistan) A Amanmuradova	3	3
WC	(France) I Ramialison	3	4
(France) A Hesse	6	6

Quarterfinals
6	(Romania) A Bogdan	7^{9}	6
4	(Russia) V Diatchenko	6^{7}	3
5	(Germany) T Korpatsch	6	6
(France) A Hesse	1	1

Semifinals
6	(Romania) A Bogdan	6	3	3
5	(Germany) T Korpatsch	0	6	6
