= 2021 Engie Open Nantes Atlantique – Doubles =

Doubles
- 2021 Engie Open Nantes Atlantique

Final
- Champions: (United Kingdom) Samantha Murray Sharan (France) Jessika Ponchet
- Runners-up: (United Kingdom) Alicia Barnett (United Kingdom) Olivia Nicholls
- Score: 6–4, 6–2

Events
Singles	Doubles
- Open Nantes Atlantique

Akgul Amanmuradova and Ekaterine Gorgodze were the defending champions but chose not to participate.

Samantha Murray Sharan and Jessika Ponchet won the title, defeating Alicia Barnett and Olivia Nicholls in the final, 6–4, 6–2.

== Seeds ==
1. (Georgia (country)) Oksana Kalashnikova / (Japan) Miyu Kato (first round)
2. (Japan) Eri Hozumi / (Russia) Ekaterina Yashina (semifinals)
3. (United States) Emina Bektas / (United Kingdom) Tara Moore (quarterfinals, retired)
4. (United Kingdom) Samantha Murray Sharan / (France) Jessika Ponchet (champions)

== Draw ==
Key

- Q = Qualifier
- WC = Wild card
- LL = Lucky loser
- Alt = Alternate
- ITF = ITF entry
- PR = Protected ranking
- SR = Special ranking
- SE = Special exempt
- JE = Junior exempt
- JR = Junior Accelerator Programme entrant
- CO = College Accelerator Programme entrant
- NG = Next Gen Accelerator Program entrant
- w/o = Walkover
- r = Retired
- d = Defaulted

=== Draw ===
First round
1	(Georgia (country)) O Kalashnikova (Japan) M Kato	6	4	[8]
(United Kingdom) A Barnett (United Kingdom) O Nicholls	2	6	[10]
WC	(France) I Ekani (France) L Tholey	2	2
(Netherlands) I Haverlag (Lithuania) J Mikulskytė	6	6
3	(United States) E Bektas (United Kingdom) T Moore	6	6
(Russia) A Gabueva (United Kingdom) E Webley-Smith	2	2
Alt	(Latvia) D Marcinkēviča (Latvia) D Vismane	7	6
WC	(Russia) E Andreeva (France) C Monnet	5	3
WC	(France) C Noël (France) M Noël	6	6
(France) E Mazzoni (France) J Mazzoni	0	2
(Germany) T Morderger (Germany) Y Morderger	1	0^{r}
4	(United Kingdom) S Murray Sharan (France) J Ponchet	6	3
(India) A Raina (India) K Thandi	2	5
(United Kingdom) SB Grey (United Kingdom) E Silva	6	7
(Romania) K Bejenaru (France) V Muntean	2	1
2	(Japan) E Hozumi (Russia) E Yashina	6	6

Quarterfinals
(United Kingdom) A Barnett (United Kingdom) O Nicholls	6	4	[12]
(Netherlands) I Haverlag (Lithuania) J Mikulskytė	3	6	[10]
3	(United States) E Bektas (United Kingdom) T Moore	3^{r}
Alt	(Latvia) D Marcinkēviča (Latvia) D Vismane	0
WC	(France) C Noël (France) M Noël
4	(United Kingdom) S Murray Sharan (France) J Ponchet	w/o
(United Kingdom) SB Grey (United Kingdom) E Silva	1	3
2	(Japan) E Hozumi (Russia) E Yashina	6	6

Semifinals
(United Kingdom) A Barnett (United Kingdom) O Nicholls	6	6
Alt	(Latvia) D Marcinkēviča (Latvia) D Vismane	3	2
4	(United Kingdom) S Murray Sharan (France) J Ponchet	6	7
2	(Japan) E Hozumi (Russia) E Yashina	3	5

Final
(United Kingdom) A Barnett (United Kingdom) O Nicholls	4	2
4	(United Kingdom) S Murray Sharan (France) J Ponchet	6	6
