= Magali Kempen =

Belgian tennis player (born 1997)

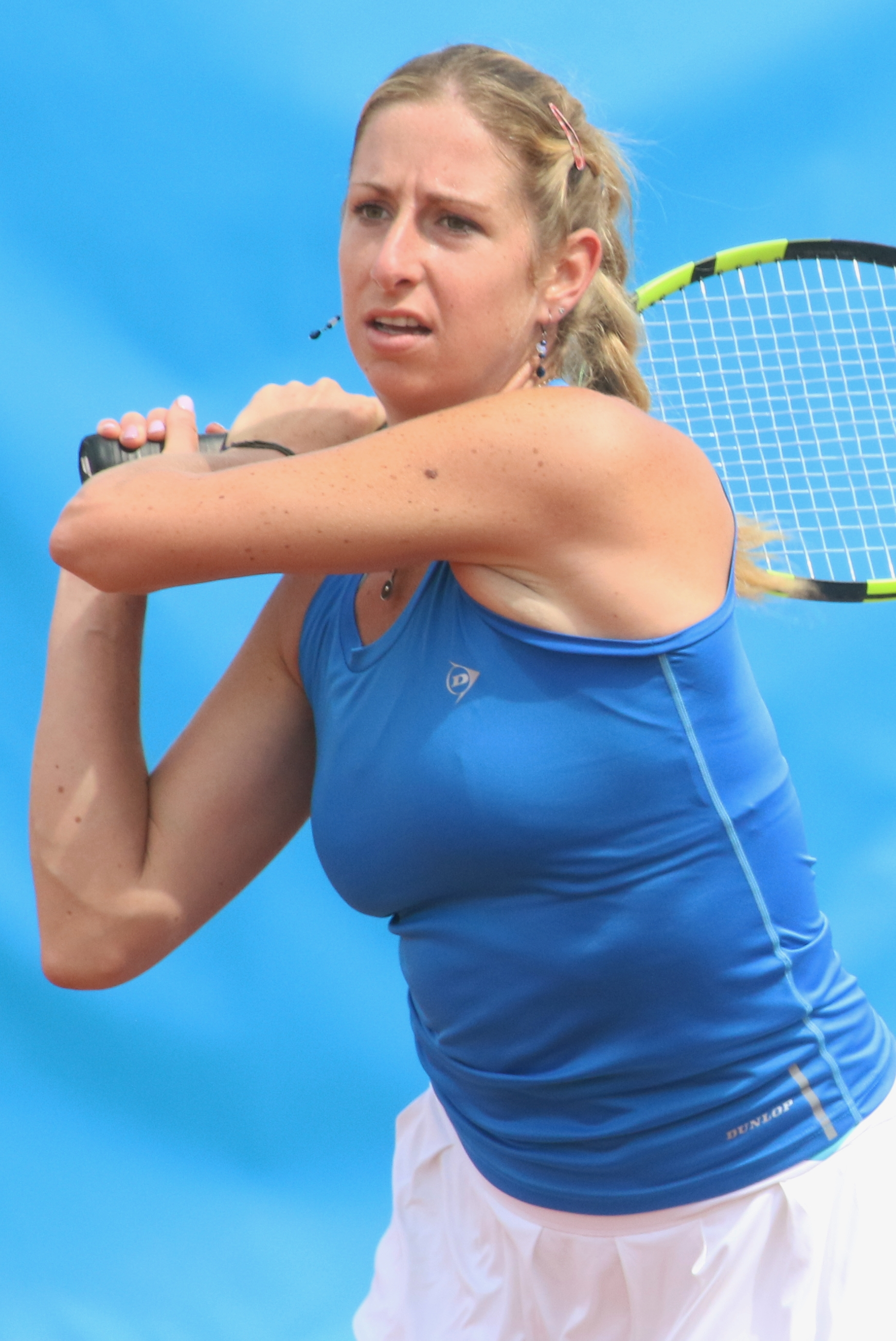
- Kempen at the Open de Biarritz in 2021
- Country (sports): Belgium
- Born: 30 November 1997 (age 28) Herentals, Belgium
- Plays: Right (two-handed backhand)
- Prize money: $684,941

Singles
- Career record: 257–154
- Career titles: 11 ITF
- Highest ranking: No. 191 (3 April 2023)

Grand Slam singles results
- Australian Open: Q1 (2023)
- French Open: Q1 (2023)
- Wimbledon: Q1 (2023)
- US Open: Q1 (2023)

Doubles
- Career record: 255–131
- Career titles: 2 WTA, 1 WTA 125
- Highest ranking: No. 34 (24 August 2026)
- Current ranking: No. 35 (31 August 2026)

Grand Slam doubles results
- Australian Open: 1R (2026)
- French Open: QF (2026)
- Wimbledon: 2R (2026)
- US Open: 2R (2026)

Team competitions
- BJK Cup: 2–2
- Last updated on: 28 September 2026.

Magali Kempen (born 30 November 1997) is a Belgian tennis player.

She has a career-high singles ranking by the WTA of 191, reached on 3 April 2023, and a highest in doubles of No. 34, achieved on 24 August 2026.

== Career ==
Kempen won her first W60 title at the 2022 Open Nantes Atlantique in doubles, with Wu Fang-hsien. The following year, she won her first W40 singles title at the Murska Sobota Open 2023.

She reached her first WTA Tour final in doubles with Lara Salden at the 2024 Mérida Open, losing to Quinn Gleason and Ingrid Martins.

Kempen won her first WTA Tour doubles title, with Anna Sisková, at the 2025 Transylvania Open, defeating Jaqueline Cristian and Angelica Moratelli in the final. They were also finalists at the 2026 Hobart International, losing to Katarzyna Piter and Janice Tjen.

Teaming with Eudice Chong, she won her second career doubles title at the 2026 Morocco Open, defeating Aldila Sutjiadi and Vera Zvonareva in the final. Playing with Alexandra Panova, Kempen reached the doubles final at the 2026 Hamburg Open, losing to Dalila Jakupović and Nika Radišić.

== Grand Slam performance timeline ==
Key
W	F	SF	QF	#R	RR	Q#	DNQ	A	NH

(W) winner; (F) finalist; (SF) semifinalist; (QF) quarterfinalist; (#R) rounds 4, 3, 2, 1; (RR) round-robin stage; (Q#) qualification round; (DNQ) did not qualify; (A) absent; (NH) not held; (SR) strike rate (events won / competed); (W–L) win–loss record.
To avoid confusion and double counting, these charts are updated at the conclusion of a tournament or when the player's participation has ended.

=== Doubles ===
Current through the 2026 French Open.

Tournament	2025	2026	SR	W–L	Win%
Grand Slam tournaments
Australian Open	A	1R	0 / 1	0–1	0%
French Open	A	QF	0 / 1	3–1	75%
Wimbledon	1R	2R	0 / 2	1–2	33%
US Open	1R	2R	0 / 2	1–2	33%
Win–loss	0–2	5–4	0 / 6	5–6	45%

== WTA Tour finals ==
=== Doubles: 6 (2 titles, 4 runner-ups) ===
Legend WTA 1000 (0–1) WTA 500 WTA 250 (2–3)	Finals by surface Hard (1–2) Clay (1–1)

Result	W–L	Date	Tournament	Tier	Surface	Partner	Opponents	Score
Loss	0–1	Oct 2024	Mérida Open, Mexico	WTA 250	Hard	(Belgium) Lara Salden	(United States) Quinn Gleason (Brazil) Ingrid Martins	4–6, 4–6
Win	1–1	Feb 2025	Transylvania Open, Romania	WTA 250	Hard (i)	(Czech Republic) Anna Sisková	(Romania) Jaqueline Cristian (Italy) Angelica Moratelli	6–3, 6–1
Loss	1–2	Jan 2026	Hobart International, Australia	WTA 250	Hard	(Czech Republic) Anna Sisková	(Poland) Katarzyna Piter (Indonesia) Janice Tjen	2–6, 2–6
Win	2–2	May 2026	Rabat Grand Prix, Morocco	WTA 250	Clay	(Hong Kong) Eudice Chong	(Indonesia) Aldila Sutjiadi; Vera Zvonareva	6–3, 2–6, [10–6]
Loss	2–3	Jul 2026	Hamburg Open, Germany	WTA 250	Clay	Alexandra Panova	(Slovenia) Dalila Jakupović (Slovenia) Nika Radišić	7–5, 3–6, [5–10]
Loss	2–4	Aug 2026	Cincinnati Open, United States	WTA 1000	Hard	Alexandra Panova	(Czech Republic) Marie Bouzková (Czech Republic) Linda Nosková	1–6, 2–6

== WTA 125 finals ==
=== Doubles: 2 (1 title, 1 runner-up) ===
Result	W–L	Date	Tournament	Surface	Partner	Opponents	Score
Win	1–0	Apr 2025	Solgironès Open, Spain	Clay	(Czech Republic) Anna Sisková	(Latvia) Darja Semeņistaja (Serbia) Nina Stojanović	7–6^{(1)}, 6–1
Loss	1-1	Apr 2026	Oeiras Open, Portugal	Clay	(Belgium) Lara Salden	(Belgium) Sofia Costoulas (Portugal) Matilde Jorge	4–6, 2–6

== ITF Circuit finals ==
Legend
W100 tournaments
W80 tournaments
W60/75 tournaments
W40/50 tournaments
W25/35 tournaments
W10/15 tournaments

=== Singles: 21 (11 titles, 10 runner-ups) ===
Result	W–L	Date	Tournament	Tier	Surface	Opponent	Score
Win	1–0	Sep 2015	ITF El Kantaoui, Tunisia	W10	Hard	(France) Joséphine Boualem	6–2, 1–6, 6–4
Win	2–0	Oct 2015	ITF El Kantaoui, Tunisia	W10	Hard	(Liechtenstein) Kathinka von Deichmann	5–7, 6–3, 6–2
Loss	2–1	Sep 2016	ITF Pétange, Luxembourg	W10	Hard	(France) Elixane Lechemia	3–6, 0–6
Loss	2–2	Jun 2017	ITF Kaltenkirchen, Germany	W15	Clay	(Germany) Katharina Gerlach	4–6, 6–7^{(2)}
Win	3–2	Sep 2017	ITF Middelkerke, Belgium	W15	Clay	(Germany) Julyette Steur	6–2, 6–2
Loss	3–3	Sep 2017	ITF Prague, Czech Republic	W15	Clay	(France) Alice Ramé	4–6, 4–5 ret.
Loss	3–4	Sep 2017	ITF Sharm El Sheikh, Egypt	W15	Hard	(Chinese Taipei) Lee Pei-chi	6–7^{(3)}, 3–6
Win	4–4	Oct 2017	ITF Sharm El Sheikh, Egypt	W15	Hard	(Chinese Taipei) Lee Pei-chi	6–7^{(4)}, 7–6^{(5)}, 6–4
Loss	4–5	Oct 2018	ITF Monastir, Tunisia	W15	Hard	(Romania) Ilona Georgiana Ghioroaie	3–6, 1–4 ret.
Win	5–5	Jan 2019	ITF Sharm El Sheikh, Egypt	W15	Hard	(Switzerland) Simona Waltert	5–7, 6–3, 6–3
Win	6–5	Feb 2019	ITF Sharm El Sheikh, Egypt	W15	Hard	(United States) Dasha Ivanova	6–3, 6–4
Loss	6–6	Apr 2019	ITF Sharm El Sheikh, Egypt	W15	Hard	(Turkey) İpek Soylu	6–7^{(2)}, 4–6
Win	7–6	Apr 2019	ITF Sharm El Sheikh, Egypt	W15	Hard	(Poland) Stefania Rogozińska Dzik	6–1, 6–2
Win	8–6	Feb 2021	ITF Sharm El Sheikh, Egypt	W15	Hard	(Belgium) Sofia Costoulas	6–3, 6–2
Loss	8–7	Apr 2021	ITF Monastir, Tunisia	W15	Hard	(France) Salma Djoubri	3–6, 4–6
Loss	8–8	Apr 2021	ITF Monastir, Tunisia	W15	Hard	(Switzerland) Joanne Züger	6–7^{(4)}, 7–5, 6–7^{(5)}
Win	9–8	Mar 2022	Open de Touraine, France	W25	Hard	(Germany) Nastasja Schunk	6–3, 6–4
Loss	9–9	Jul 2022	ITF Den Haag, Netherlands	W25	Clay	(Hungary) Natália Szabanin	6–7^{(3)}, 4–6
Loss	9–10	Sep 2022	ITF Le Neubourg, France	W80	Hard	(Romania) Jaqueline Cristian	4–6, 4–6
Win	10–10	Apr 2023	Murska Sobota Open, Slovenia	W40	Hard (i)	(Russia) Maria Timofeeva	7–5, 7–5
Win	11–10	Feb 2024	ITF Edgbaston, UK	W50	Hard (i)	(Czech Republic) Barbora Palicová	6–3, 7–6^{(6)}

=== Doubles: 44 (27 titles, 17 runner-ups) ===
Result	W–L	Date	Tournament	Tier	Surface	Partner	Opponents	Score
Loss	0–1	Aug 2012	ITF Middelkerke, Belgium	W10	Hard	(Belgium) Steffi Distelmans	(Republic of Ireland) Amy Bowtell (United Kingdom) Samantha Murray	3–6, 3–6
Win	1–1	Aug 2013	ITF Koksijde, Belgium	W25	Clay	(Belgium) Nicky Van Dyck	(Belgium) Marie Benoît (Belgium) Kimberley Zimmermann	6–3, 7–6^{(3)}
Win	2–1	Apr 2014	ITF Heraklion, Greece	W10	Hard	(Belgium) Elke Lemmens	(Georgia (country)) Natela Dzalamidze (Greece) Valentini Grammatikopoulou	1–6, 7–5, [10–8]
Win	3–1	Jun 2014	ITF Sharm El Sheikh, Egypt	W10	Hard	(Russia) Anna Morgina	(United States) Jan Abaza (Egypt) Ola Abou Zekry	6–4, 3–6, [10–2]
Win	4–1	Jul 2014	ITF Maaseik, Belgium	W10	Clay	(Belgium) Steffi Distelmans	(Netherlands) Bernice van de Velde (Netherlands) Kelly Versteeg	6–4, 6–3
Win	5–1	Dec 2014	ITF Djibouti	W10	Hard	(United Kingdom) Francesca Stephenson	(United Kingdom) Laura Deigman (Hungary) Naomi Totka	7–6^{(7)}, 6–3
Loss	5–2	Dec 2014	ITF Djibouti	W10	Hard	(China) Wang Xiyao	(France) Tessah Andrianjafitrimo (India) Ashmitha Easwaramurthi	6–3, 1–6, [8–10]
Loss	5–3	Mar 2015	ITF El Kantaoui, Tunisia	W10	Hard	(South Africa) Chanel Simmonds	(France) Myrtille Georges (Bulgaria) Isabella Shinikova	6–1, 4–6, [2–10]
Win	6–3	Oct 2015	ITF El Kantaoui, Tunisia	W10	Hard	(Russia) Yana Sizikova	(Poland) Patrycja Polańska (Czech Republic) Anna Slováková	7–6^{(0)}, 6–4
Loss	6–4	Nov 2015	ITF Helsinki, Finland	W10	Hard	(Netherlands) Kelly Versteeg	(Russia) Daria Lodikova (Russia) Daria Mishina	6–3, 2–6, [5–10]
Win	7–4	Aug 2016	ITF Wanfercée-Baulet, Belgium	W10	Clay	(France) Manon Arcangioli	(Belgium) Anastasia Smirnova (Belgium) Victoria Smirnova	6–2, 6–0
Loss	7–5	Sep 2016	ITF Pétange, Luxembourg	W10	Hard	(Poland) Justyna Jegiołka	(Netherlands) Chayenne Ewijk (Netherlands) Rosalie van der Hoek	6–7^{(6)}, 3–6
Win	8–5	Feb 2017	ITF Sharm El Sheikh, Egypt	W15	Hard	(United States) Shelby Talcott	(Sweden) Brenda Njuki (Austria) Marlies Szupper	7–6^{(5)}, 6–2
Win	9–5	Feb 2017	ITF Sharm El Sheikh	W15	Hard	(Belgium) Britt Geukens	(Romania) Elena Bogdan (Romania) Miriam Bulgaru	6–3, 2–6, [10–7]
Win	10–5	May 2017	ITF Cairo, Egypt	W15	Clay	(Colombia) María Herazo González	(India) Sowjanya Bavisetti (India) Rishika Sunkara	6–1, 6–2
Loss	10–6	Jun 2017	ITF Kaltenkirchen, Germany	W15	Clay	(Australia) Gabriella Da Silva-Fick	(Uzbekistan) Albina Khabibulina (Germany) Lisa Ponomar	4–6, 0–6
Loss	10–7	Aug 2017	ITF Koksijde, Belgium	W25	Clay	(Belgium) Marie Benoît	(India) Ankita Raina (Netherlands) Bibiane Schoofs	6–3, 3–6, [9–11]
Win	11–7	Sep 2017	ITF Middelkere, Belgium	W15	Clay	(France) Sara Cakarevic	(Romania) Cristina Adamescu (Spain) Cristina Bucșa	6–4, 4–6, [10–5]
Win	12–7	Jan 2019	ITF Sharm El Sheikh, Egypt	W15	Hard	(Austria) Melanie Klaffner	(Sweden) Jacqueline Cabaj Awad (Switzerland) Fiona Ganz	6–4, 6–1
Loss	12–8	Feb 2021	ITF Sharm El Sheikh	W15	Hard	(Belarus) Shalimar Talbi	(Chinese Taipei) Liang En-shuo (Japan) Kyōka Okamura	6–1, 4–6, [3–10]
Win	13–8	Apr 2021	ITF Monastir, Tunisia	W15	Hard	(Belgium) Chelsea Vanhoutte	(United States) Emma Davis (Denmark) Olivia Gram	6–4, 6–1
Loss	13–9	Apr 2021	ITF Monastir, Tunisia	W15	Hard	(Belgium) Chelsea Vanhoutte	(New Zealand) Paige Hourigan (Australia) Alexandra Osborne	1–4 ret.
Loss	13–10	Jul 2021	Open de Biarritz, France	W60	Clay	(United Kingdom) Sarah Beth Grey	(Russia) Oksana Selekhmeteva (Latvia) Daniela Vismane	3–6, 6–7^{(5)}
Loss	13–11	Aug 2021	ITF Pärnu, Estonia	W25	Clay	(India) Rutuja Bhosale	(Lithuania) Justina Mikulskytė (Czech Republic) Anna Sisková	7–6^{(5)}, 3–6, [5–10]
Win	14–11	Aug 2022	ITF Koksijde, Belgium	W25	Clay	(Belgium) Lara Salden	(Belgium) Amelie van Impe (Belgium) Hanne Vandewinkel	6–2, 6–2
Win	15–11	Sep 2022	ITF Saint-Palais-sur-Mer, France	W25	Clay	(China) Lu Jiajing	(France) Marine Partaud (Ukraine) Valeriya Strakhova	6–4, 6–4
Win	16–11	Nov 2022	Open Nantes Atlantique, France	W60	Hard (i)	(Chinese Taipei) Wu Fang-hsien	(Slovenia) Veronika Erjavec (United Kingdom) Emily Webley-Smith	6–2, 6–4
Loss	16–12	Nov 2022	ITF Sharm El Sheikh, Egypt	W25	Hard	(China) Lu Jiajing	(Netherlands) Arantxa Rus (Serbia) Nina Stojanović	6–7^{(1)}, 2–6
Win	17–12	Nov 2022	ITF Pétange, Luxembourg	W25	Hard (i)	(Switzerland) Xenia Knoll	(Netherlands) Bibiane Schoofs (Netherlands) Rosalie van der Hoek	6–0, 6–4
Loss	17–13	Jan 2023	ITF Sunderland, UK	W60	Hard (i)	(United Kingdom) Eden Silva	(United Kingdom) Freya Christie (United Kingdom) Ali Collins	3–6, 6–7^{(5)}
Win	18–13	Feb 2023	ITF Mâcon, France	W40	Hard (i)	(Switzerland) Xenia Knoll	(Russia) Darya Astakhova (India) Prarthana Thombare	6–3, 6–4
Loss	18–14	Mar 2023	ITF Murska Sobota, Slovenia	W40	Hard	(Switzerland) Xenia Knoll	(Romania) Andreea Mitu (United Kingdom) Harriet Dart	w/o
Win	19–14	Dec 2023	ITF Monastir, Tunisia	W25	Hard	(Belgium) Lara Salden	(Germany) Katharina Hobgarski (Greece) Sapfo Sakellaridi	6–7^{(5)}, 6–4, [10–4]
Win	20–14	Feb 2024	ITF Edgbaston, UK	W50	Hard (i)	(Belgium) Lara Salden	(United Kingdom) Ali Collins (United Kingdom) Lily Miyazaki	7–6^{(6)}, 6–2
Win	21–14	Jun 2024	ITF La Marsa, Tunisia	W35	Hard	(Belgium) Lara Salden	(Slovakia) Katarína Kužmová (Slovakia) Radka Zelníčková	6–4, 7–6^{(5)}
Win	22–14	Aug 2024	ITF Koksijde, Belgium	W35	Clay	(Belgium) Lara Salden	(Germany) Laura Böhner (Japan) Funa Kozaki	6–4, 6–0
Win	23–14	Aug 2024	ITF Duffel, Belgium	W35	Clay	(Belgium) Ema Kovacevic	(Belgium) Tilwith Di Girolami (Netherlands) Lian Tran	6–1, 6–4
Win	24–14	Aug 2024	ITF Meerbusch, Germany	W50	Clay	(Belgium) Lara Salden	(Germany) Gina Marie Dittmann (Germany) Vivien Sandberg	6–3, 6–0
Loss	24–15	Oct 2024	ITF Quinta do Lago, Portugal	W50	Hard	(Belgium) Lara Salden	(Portugal) Matilde Jorge (Lithuania) Justina Mikulskytė	6–2, 4–6, [12–14]
Loss	24–16	Oct 2024	Challenger de Saguenay, Canada	W75+H	Hard (i)	(Belgium) Lara Salden	(United States) Dalayna Hewitt (United States) Anna Rogers	1–6, 5–7
Win	25–16	Feb 2025	Mâcon Open, France	W50	Hard (i)	(Lithuania) Justina Mikulskytė	(Germany) Tayisiya Morderger (Germany) Yana Morderger	7–6^{(5)}, 6–2
Loss	25–17	Mar 2025	Trnava Indoor, Slovakia	W75	Hard (i)	(France) Jessika Ponchet	(Netherlands) Isabelle Haverlag; Elena Pridankina	2–6, 3–6
Win	26–17	Jul 2025	ITF Gran Canaria, Spain	W100	Clay	(Czech Republic) Anna Sisková	(United Kingdom) Madeleine Brooks (Hong Kong) Eudice Chong	6–2, 6–3
Win	27–17	Aug 2025	ITF Koksijde, Belgium	W50	Clay	(Czech Republic) Anna Sisková	(Italy) Anastasia Abbagnato (Croatia) Mariana Dražić	7–6^{(5)}, 5–7, [10–6]
