= Ali Collins =

British tennis player (born 2000)

- Country (sports): Great Britain
- Born: 27 May 2000 (age 26)
- Prize money: $52,613

Singles
- Career record: 26–29
- Career titles: 0
- Highest ranking: No. 911 (30 September 2019)

Doubles
- Career record: 105–88
- Career titles: 9 ITF
- Highest ranking: No. 110 (26 June 2023)

Grand Slam doubles results
- Wimbledon: 1R (2023)

Ali Collins (born 27 May 2000) is a British former tennis player.

Collins has a career-high doubles ranking of world No. 110, achieved on 26 June 2023.

She made her WTA Tour main-draw debut at the 2022 Birmingham Classic, in the doubles draw, partnering Emily Appleton.

== Personal life ==
From Glasgow, she is the daughter of former professional footballer Lee Collins. She began to be coached by Judy Murray from the age of seven. She has said she switched to concentrate on doubles because she is “a team player” and struggled with aspects of being alone on tour.

== ITF Circuit finals ==
=== Singles: 1 (runner-up) ===
Legend W15 tournaments	Finals by surface Clay (0–1)

Result	Date	Tournament	Tier	Surface	Opponent	Score
Loss	Sep 2019	ITF Melilla, Spain	W15	Clay	(Spain) Ángela Fita Boluda	3–6, 4–6

=== Doubles: 21 (9 titles, 12 runner-ups) ===
Legend W80 tournaments W60/75 tournaments W40/50 tournaments W25/35 tournaments W15 tournaments	Finals by surface Hard (8–8) Clay (1–3) Carpet (0–1)

Result	W–L	Date	Tournament	Tier	Surface	Partner	Opponents	Score
Loss	0–1	Dec 2018	ITF Monastir, Tunisia	W15	Hard	(Italy) Claudia Giovine	(Serbia) Tamara Čurović (United States) Chiara Scholl	6–7^{(5)}, 4–6
Win	1–1	Sep 2019	ITF Haren, Netherlands	W15	Clay	(United Kingdom) Emily Arbuthnott	(Turkey) Cemre Anıl (Russia) Anna Pribylova	3–6, 6–0, [10–4]
Loss	1–2	Jul 2021	ITF Kyiv, Ukraine	W25	Clay	(Venezuela) Andrea Gámiz	(South Korea) Jang Su-jeong (Serbia) Bojana Marinković	6–3, 4–6, [7–10]
Loss	1–3	Jan 2022	GB Pro-Series Loughborough, UK	W25	Hard	(United Kingdom) Emily Appleton	(Germany) Anna Gabric (Romania) Arina Vasilescu	4–6, 5–7
Loss	1–4	Feb 2022	ITF Mâcon, France	W25	Hard	(United Kingdom) Emily Appleton	(Switzerland) Xenia Knoll (Romania) Andreea Mitu	1–6, 1–6
Win	2–4	Mar 2022	Open de Touraine, France	W25	Hard	(United Kingdom) Emily Appleton	(Germany) Mona Barthel (Belgium) Yanina Wickmayer	2–6, 6–4, [10–6]
Win	3–4	Aug 2022	GB Pro-Series Foxhills, UK	W25	Hard (i)	(United Kingdom) Freya Christie	(United Kingdom) Naiktha Bains (United Kingdom) Maia Lumsden	6–3, 6–3
Win	4–4	Aug 2022	ITF Aldershot, UK	W25	Hard	(United Kingdom) Freya Christie	(Lithuania) Andrė Lukošiūtė (United Kingdom) Eliz Maloney	6–4, 6–2
Win	5–4	Sep 2022	ITF Le Neubourg, France	W80	Hard	(United Kingdom) Freya Christie	(Poland) Weronika Falkowska (United Kingdom) Sarah Beth Grey	1–6, 7–6^{(4)}, [10–3]
Win	6–4	Oct 2022	GB Pro-Series Glasgow, UK	W60	Hard (i)	(United Kingdom) Freya Christie	(Spain) Irene Burillo Escorihuela (Spain) Andrea Lázaro García	6–4, 6–1
Loss	6–5	Jan 2023	ITF Tallinn, Estonia	W40	Hard (i)	(United Kingdom) Freya Christie	(Czech Republic) Anna Sisková (United States) Jessie Aney	4–6, 7–6^{(3)}, [7–10]
Win	7–5	Jan 2023	ITF Sunderland, UK	W60	Hard (i)	(United Kingdom) Freya Christie	(Belgium) Magali Kempen (United Kingdom) Eden Silva	6–3, 7–6^{(5)}
Win	8–5	Feb 2023	Open de l'Isère, France	W60	Hard (i)	(United Kingdom) Freya Christie	Sofya Lansere; Maria Timofeeva	6–4, 6–3
Loss	8–6	Feb 2023	AK Ladies Open, Germany	W60	Carpet (i)	(United Kingdom) Freya Christie	(Belgium) Greet Minnen (Belgium) Yanina Wickmayer	1–6, 3–6
Loss	8–7	Apr 2023	Bellinzona Ladies Open, Switzerland	W60	Clay	(United Kingdom) Freya Christie	(Switzerland) Conny Perrin (Czech Republic) Anna Sisková	6–3, 6–7^{(9)}, [5–10]
Win	9–7	Nov 2023	Open Nantes Atlantique, France	W60	Hard (i)	(United Kingdom) Lily Miyazaki	(United Kingdom) Emily Appleton (Netherlands) Isabelle Haverlag	7–6^{(4)}, 6–2
Loss	9–8	Nov 2023	ITF Pétange, Luxembourg	W40	Hard (i)	(Netherlands) Isabelle Haverlag	(United Kingdom) Alicia Barnett (United Kingdom) Samantha Murray Sharan	7–6^{(4)}, 1–6, [6–10]
Loss	9–9	Feb 2024	ITF Edgbaston, UK	W50	Hard (i)	(United Kingdom) Lily Miyazaki	(Belgium) Magali Kempen (Belgium) Lara Salden	6–7^{(6)}, 2–6
Loss	9–10	Feb 2024	ITF Roehampton, UK	W50	Hard (i)	(Estonia) Elena Malõgina	(United Kingdom) Freya Christie (United Kingdom) Samantha Murray Sharan	6–7^{(5)}, 3–6
Loss	9–11	May 2024	ITF Nottingham, UK	W35	Hard	(United Kingdom) Lauryn John-Baptiste	(United Kingdom) Holly Hutchinson (United Kingdom) Ella McDonald	6–7^{(4)}, 6–7^{(5)}
Loss	9–12	Jun 2024	Internazionali di Caserta, Italy	W75	Clay	(Colombia) María Paulina Pérez	(Colombia) Yuliana Lizarazo (Greece) Despina Papamichail	6–4, 3–6, [3–10]
