= Open Nantes Atlantique =

Engie Open Nantes Atlantique
- 2022 Engie Open Nantes Atlantique

ITF Women's Tour
- Event name: Engie Open Nantes Atlantique (2017–present); Open GDF Suez Nantes Atlantique (–2014)
- Location: Nantes, France
- Venue: Centre de Ligue de Tennis des Pays de la Loire
- Category: ITF Women's Circuit
- Surface: Hard (indoor)
- Draw: 32S/32Q/16D
- Prize money: $60,000
- Website: tournoi.fft.fr/open.nantes-atlantique

The Engie Open Nantes Atlantique is a tournament for professional female tennis players on indoor hardcourts. The event is classified as a $60,000 ITF Women's Circuit tournament and has been held in Nantes, France, since 2003.

== Past finals ==
=== Singles ===
Year	Champion	Runner-up	Score
2026	(Belgium) Jeline Vandromme	(Germany) Mona Barthel	3–2 ret.
2025	(Australia) Talia Gibson	(Malta) Francesca Curmi	3–6, 7–5, 6–1
2024	(France) Léolia Jeanjean	(France) Sara Cakarevic	6–1, 6–3
2023	(France) Océane Dodin	(Czech Republic) Gabriela Knutson	6–7^{(2–7)}, 6–3, 6–2
2022	Kamilla Rakhimova	(China) Wang Xinyu	6–4, 6–4
2021	(Ukraine) Anhelina Kalinina	(France) Océane Dodin	7–6^{(7–4)}, 1–0 ret.
2020	Tournament cancelled due to the COVID-19 pandemic		
2019	(Spain) Cristina Bucșa	(Germany) Tamara Korpatsch	6–2, 6–7^{(11–13)}, 7–6^{(8–6)}
2018	(Switzerland) Timea Bacsinszky	(France) Amandine Hesse	6–4, 3–6, 6–1
2017	(Estonia) Kaia Kanepi	(Netherlands) Richèl Hogenkamp	6–3, 6–4
2016	Not held		
2015	(France) Mathilde Johansson	(Romania) Andreea Mitu	6–3, 6–4
2014	(Czech Republic) Kateřina Siniaková	(Tunisia) Ons Jabeur	7–5, 6–2
2013	(Belarus) Aliaksandra Sasnovich	(Poland) Magda Linette	4–6, 6–4, 6–2
2012	(Romania) Monica Niculescu	(Kazakhstan) Yulia Putintseva	6–2, 6–3
2011	(United States) Alison Riske	(France) Iryna Brémond	6–1, 6–4
2010	(Czech Republic) Lucie Hradecká	(Russia) Valeria Savinykh	6–3, 6–1
2009	(Netherlands) Arantxa Rus	(Czech Republic) Renata Voráčová	6–3, 6–2
2008	(Russia) Vesna Manasieva	(Switzerland) Stefanie Vögele	6–3, 6–2
2007	(Poland) Anna Korzeniak	(France) Virginie Pichet	6–4, 6–0
2006	(Belarus) Iryna Kuryanovich	(Belgium) Caroline Maes	1–6, 7–5, 6–1
2005	(Germany) Kristina Barrois	(Italy) Alberta Brianti	6–4, 6–2
2004	(Belgium) Leslie Butkiewicz	(Hungary) Rita Kuti Kis	6–2, 6–1
2003	(New Zealand) Eden Marama	(France) Pascale Leroy	4–6, 6–0, 6–1

=== Doubles ===
Year	Champions	Runners-up	Score
2026	Kira Pavlova; Elena Pridankina	(France) Tiphanie Lemaître (Ukraine) Veronika Podrez	6–4, 6–3
2025	(Poland) Martyna Kubka (Sweden) Lisa Zaar	(Belgium) Sofia Costoulas (Australia) Talia Gibson	6–3, 6–2
2024	(Italy) Tyra Caterina Grant (Italy) Camilla Rosatello	(Latvia) Diāna Marcinkēviča (Burundi) Sada Nahimana	6–2, 6–1
2023	(United Kingdom) Ali Collins (United Kingdom) Yuriko Miyazaki	(United Kingdom) Emily Appleton (Netherlands) Isabelle Haverlag	7–6^{(7–4)}, 6–2
2022	(Belgium) Magali Kempen (Chinese Taipei) Wu Fang-hsien	(Slovenia) Veronika Erjavec (United Kingdom) Emily Webley-Smith	6–2, 6–4
2021	(United Kingdom) Samantha Murray Sharan (France) Jessika Ponchet	(United Kingdom) Alicia Barnett (United Kingdom) Olivia Nicholls	6–4, 6–2
2020	Tournament cancelled due to the COVID-19 pandemic		
2019	(Uzbekistan) Akgul Amanmuradova (Georgia (country)) Ekaterine Gorgodze	(Germany) Vivian Heisen (Russia) Yana Sizikova	7–6^{(7–2)}, 6–3
2018	(France) Estelle Cascino (France) Elixane Lechemia	(Uzbekistan) Akgul Amanmuradova (Russia) Alina Silich	7–5, 6–4
2017	(France) Manon Arcangioli (France) Shérazad Reix	(Netherlands) Lesley Kerkhove (Netherlands) Michaëlla Krajicek	6–2, 6–3
2016	Not held		
2015	(Czech Republic) Lenka Kunčíková (Czech Republic) Karolína Stuchlá	(Czech Republic) Kateřina Siniaková (Czech Republic) Renata Voráčová	6–4, 6–2
2014	(Ukraine) Lyudmyla Kichenok (Ukraine) Nadiia Kichenok	(France) Stéphanie Foretz (France) Amandine Hesse	6–2, 6–3
2013	(Czech Republic) Lucie Hradecká (Netherlands) Michaëlla Krajicek	(France) Stéphanie Foretz Gacon (Czech Republic) Eva Hrdinová	6–3, 6–2
2012	(Colombia) Catalina Castaño (Bosnia and Herzegovina) Mervana Jugić-Salkić	(Czech Republic) Petra Cetkovská (Czech Republic) Renata Voráčová	6–4, 6–4
2011	(France) Stéphanie Foretz Gacon (France) Kristina Mladenovic	(France) Julie Coin (Czech Republic) Eva Hrdinová	6–0, 6–4
2010	(United Kingdom) Anne Keothavong (United Kingdom) Anna Smith	(Bosnia and Herzegovina) Mervana Jugić-Salkić (Croatia) Darija Jurak	5–7, 6–1, [10–6]
2009	(Czech Republic) Lucie Hradecká (Czech Republic) Michaela Paštiková	(Czech Republic) Vladimíra Uhlířová (Czech Republic) Renata Voráčová	6–4, 6–4
2008	(Belarus) Ekaterina Dzehalevich (Ukraine) Yuliana Fedak	(Croatia) Darija Jurak (Slovenia) Maša Zec Peškirič	6–3, 6–4
2007	(Sweden) Sofia Arvidsson (Sweden) Johanna Larsson	(Belgium) Caroline Maes (United Kingdom) Melanie South	4–6, 7–5, [10–7]
2006	(United Kingdom) Rebecca Llewellyn (United Kingdom) Melanie South	(Germany) Sabine Lisicki (France) Irena Pavlovic	6–2, 6–0
2005	(France) Mailyne Andrieux (Czech Republic) Renata Voráčová	(Canada) Marie-Ève Pelletier (France) Aurélie Védy	6–7^{(3–7)}, 7–5, 6–2
2004	(Belarus) Iryna Kuryanovich (Belarus) Tatsiana Uvarova	(Germany) Gréta Arn (Hungary) Rita Kuti Kis	6–4, 4–6, 7–6^{(7–5)}
2003	(New Zealand) Eden Marama (New Zealand) Paula Marama	(Belarus) Iryna Kuryanovich (Israel) Yevgenia Savransky	6–4, 6–2
