= Lily Miyazaki =

British tennis player (born 1995)

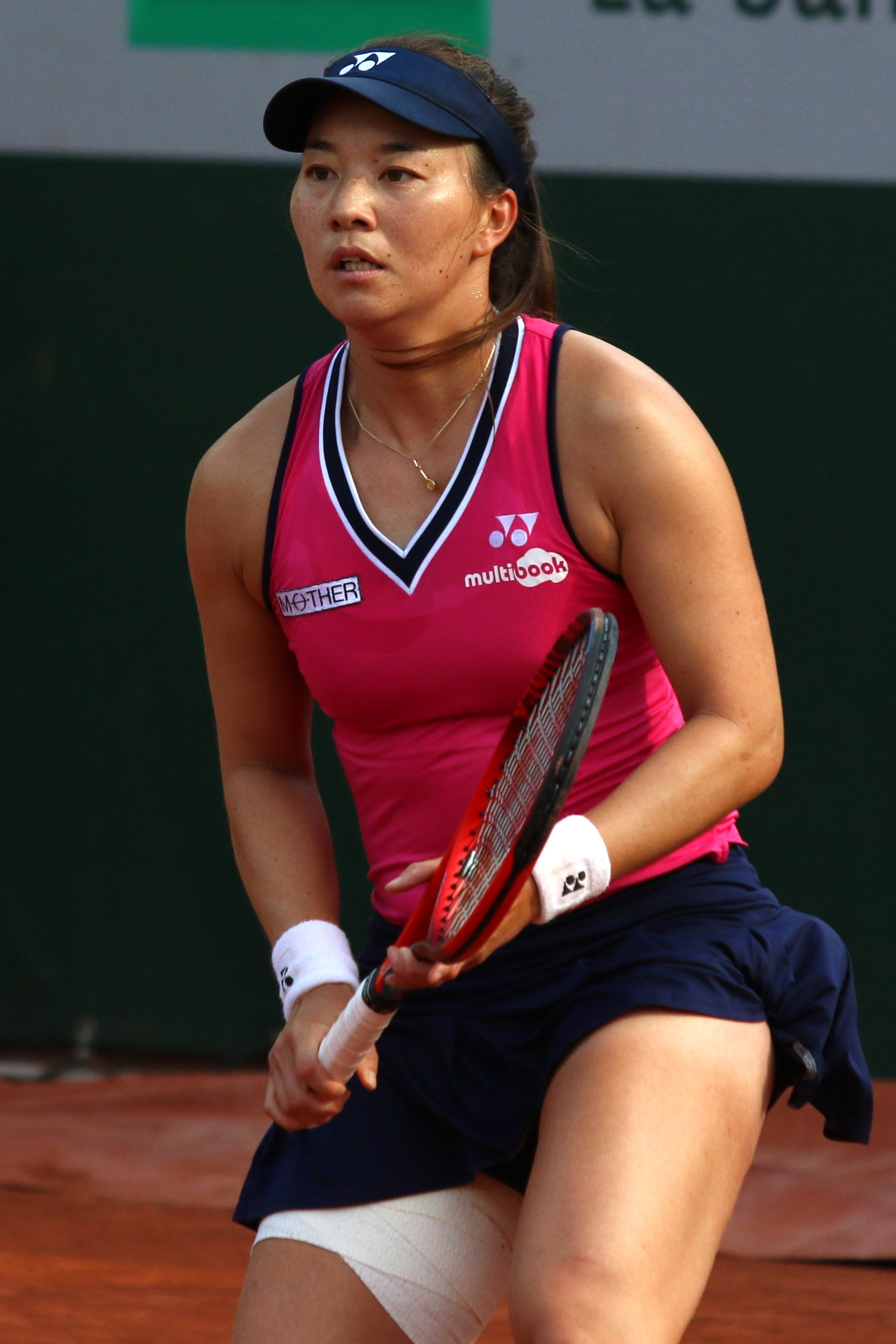
- Miyazaki at the 2023 French Open
- ITF name: Yuriko Lily Miyazaki
- Country (sports): Japan (2013–2022); Great Britain (2022–)
- Residence: London, England
- Born: 11 November 1995 (age 30) Tokyo, Japan
- Height: 1.65 m (5 ft 5 in)
- Plays: Right (two-handed backhand)
- College: Oklahoma (2014–2018)
- Coach: Matt James
- Prize money: $915,696

Singles
- Career record: 306–218
- Career titles: 8 ITF
- Highest ranking: No. 132 (22 July 2024)
- Current ranking: No. 319 (13 July 2026)

Grand Slam singles results
- Australian Open: Q3 (2023)
- French Open: Q2 (2022)
- Wimbledon: 2R (2024)
- US Open: 2R (2023)

Doubles
- Career record: 114–104
- Career titles: 8 ITF
- Highest ranking: No. 184 (22 July 2024)
- Current ranking: No. 404 (13 July 2026)

Grand Slam doubles results
- Wimbledon: 2R (2024)
- Last updated on: 14 July 2026.

Yuriko Lily Miyazaki (born 11 November 1995) is a Japanese-born British tennis player. Miyazaki has career-high rankings by the WTA of 132 in singles and 184 in doubles. She has won eight singles and eight doubles titles on the ITF Circuit.

== Early life, junior and college years ==
Miyazaki was born in Tokyo, Japan, and lived there before moving to Switzerland and settling in London aged 10. She trained at Sutton Tennis Academy up until the age of 18. She switched to British nationality in March 2022, as Japanese citizens are not allowed to hold dual citizenship.

Miyazaki attended the University of Oklahoma (2014–2019), where she completed an undergraduate degree in mathematics followed by a master's degree in information technology management. She played No. 1 singles all four years at Oklahoma, recording an overall record of 96–35, and was named to the All-Big 12 first team three times.

== Professional ==
Miyazaki made her WTA Tour main-draw debut at the 2021 Transylvania Open, partnering Anastasia Gasanova in the doubles tournament. She made her WTA Tour singles debut at the 2022 Lyon Open, after qualifying for the main draw. Miyazaki switched from representing Japan to Great Britain in March 2022.

In June 2022, it was announced that Miyazaki had been awarded a main-draw wildcard for the 2022 Wimbledon Championships, where she made her major debut.

In October 2022, Miyazaki won her first $60k title in Glasgow beating former top 40 player, compatriot Heather Watson, in the final, coming back from a set and a double break down.

In September 2023, she made her debut at the US Open and recorded her first win at this major as a qualifier. She had her breakthrough by coming through three rounds of qualifying defeating 23rd seed Daria Snigur, and Valeria Savinykh in straight sets, and ninth seed Viktória Hrunčáková in the final round. In the first round of the main draw, she drew former top-50 player Margarita Betova, who had entered on a protected ranking following injuries and a maternity break. Miyazaki won in straight sets, achieving her first ever singles win at a major. She subsequently lost in the second round to 15th seed Belinda Bencic winning three games in each set, and rose to a career-high ranking of No. 154 on 11 September 2023, after the event.

Given a wildcard entry into the main draw at Wimbledon, Miyazaki won her first-round match against Tamara Korpatsch 6–2, 6–1, before being double-bagelled by 12th seed Daria Kasatkina in round two. Partnering with Emily Appleton, she was also given a wildcard entry into the women's doubles, reaching the second round with a win over Wang Xiyu and Zhu Lin in a deciding set tie-break, before losing to top seeds Elise Mertens and Hsieh Su-wei.

At the 2024 Jasmin Open in Monastir, Tunisia, Miyazaki defeated Alycia Parks, in the first round, before losing to Antonia Ružić.

== Grand Slam performance timelines ==
Key
W	F	SF	QF	#R	RR	Q#	P#	DNQ	A	Z#	PO	G	S	B	NMS	NTI	P	NH

(W) winner; (F) finalist; (SF) semifinalist; (QF) quarterfinalist; (#R) rounds 4, 3, 2, 1; (RR) round-robin stage; (Q#) qualification round; (P#) preliminary round; (DNQ) did not qualify; (A) absent; (Z#) Davis/Fed Cup Zonal Group (with number indication) or (PO) play-off; (G) gold, (S) silver or (B) bronze Olympic/Paralympic medal; (NMS) not a Masters tournament; (NTI) not a Tier I tournament; (P) postponed; (NH) not held; (SR) strike rate (events won / competed); (W–L) win–loss record.
To avoid confusion and double counting, these charts are updated at the conclusion of a tournament or when the player's participation has ended.

=== Singles ===
Tournament	2022	2023	2024	2025	2026	SR	W–L	Win %
Australian Open	Q1	Q3	Q1	A	A	0 / 0	0–0	–
French Open	Q2	Q1	Q1	A	A	0 / 0	0–0	–
Wimbledon	1R	Q2	2R	A	Q1	0 / 2	1–2	33%
US Open	Q1	2R	Q3	A		0 / 1	1–1	50%
Win–loss	0–1	1–1	1–1	0–0	0–0	0 / 3	2–3	40%

== ITF Circuit finals ==
=== Singles: 14 (8 titles, 6 runner-ups) ===
Legend W60/75 tournaments W25/35 tournaments W10/15 tournaments	Finals by surface Hard (8–6)

Result	W–L	Date	Tournament	Tier	Surface	Opponent	Score
Loss	0–1	May 2014	ITF Sharm El Sheikh, Egypt	W10	Hard	(Russia) Anastasiya Saitova	3–6, 2–6
Loss	0–2	Dec 2019	ITF Monastir, Tunisia	W15	Hard	(Finland) Anastasia Kulikova	6–7^{(6)}, 4–6
Win	1–2	Dec 2019	ITF Monastir, Tunisia	W15	Hard	(Russia) Yana Karpovich	6–0, 6–3
Win	2–2	Mar 2020	Yokohama Challenger, Japan	W25	Hard	(Japan) Mai Hontama	7–5, 5–7, 6–2
Win	3–2	Mar 2021	ITF Sharm El Sheikh, Egypt	W15	Hard	(Japan) Momoko Kobori	6–2, 4–6, 6–3
Win	4–2	Mar 2021	ITF Sharm El Sheikh, Egypt	W15	Hard	(United Kingdom) Matilda Mutavdzic	6–3, 6–3
Loss	4–3	Aug 2021	ITF Vigo, Spain	W25	Hard	(Australia) Olivia Gadecki	2–6, 4–6
Loss	4–4	Oct 2021	Las Vegas Open, United States	W60	Hard	(United States) Emina Bektas	1–6, 1–6
Win	5–4	Oct 2022	GB Pro-Series Glasgow, UK	W60	Hard (i)	(United Kingdom) Heather Watson	5–7, 7–6^{(6)}, 6–2
Loss	5–5	Dec 2022	Indoor Championships Kyoto, Japan	W60	Hard (i)	(Japan) Miyu Kato	4–6, 6–2, 2–6
Win	6–5	Jan 2024	Open Andrézieux-Bouthéon, France	W75	Hard (i)	(France) Jessika Ponchet	3–6, 6–4, 6–1
Win	7–5	Mar 2024	Open de Seine-et-Marne, France	W75	Hard (i)	(Germany) Mona Barthel	6–4, 7–5
Loss	7–6	Mar 2025	ITF Helsinki, Finland	W35	Hard (i)	(Belgium) Sofia Costoulas	3–6, 5–7
Win	8–6	May 2026	ITF Nottingham, UK	W35	Hard	(United Kingdom) Emily Appleton	6–3, 6–3

=== Doubles: 15 (8 titles, 7 runner-ups) ===
Legend W100 tournaments W60 tournaments W40/50 tournaments W25 tournaments W15 tournaments	Finals by surface Hard (8–7)

Result	W–L	Date	Tournament	Tier	Surface	Partner	Opponents	Score
Win	1–0	Jun 2017	ITF Guimarães, Portugal	W15	Hard	(Netherlands) Arianne Hartono	(Italy) Maria Masini (Spain) Olga Parres Azcoitia	7–5, 6–0
Loss	1–1	Apr 2019	ITF Cancún, Mexico	W15	Hard	(France) Mathilde Armitano	(Mexico) Victoria Rodríguez (Mexico) Marcela Zacarías	2–6, 0–6
Loss	1–2	Oct 2019	ITF Andrézieux-Bouthéon, France	W15	Hard (i)	(United Kingdom) Emily Appleton	(Italy) Valentina Losciale (France) Carla Touly	5–7, 3–6
Win	2–2	Nov 2020	Lousada Indoor Open, Portugal	W15	Hard (i)	(Netherlands) Arianne Hartono	(India) Riya Bhatia (Portugal) Inês Murta	6–1, 5–7, [10–7]
Loss	2–3	Feb 2021	Open de l'Isère, France	W25	Hard (i)	(Netherlands) Arianne Hartono	(Romania) Ioana Loredana Roșca (Belgium) Kimberley Zimmermann	1–6, 5–7
Loss	2–4	Mar 2021	ITF Sharm El Sheikh, Egypt	W15	Hard	(United Kingdom) Alicia Barnett	(Japan) Momoko Kobori (Japan) Ayano Shimizu	4–6, 1–6
Win	3–4	Mar 2021	ITF Sharm El Sheikh, Egypt	W15	Hard	(United Kingdom) Alicia Barnett	(South Korea) Ku Yeon-woo (Canada) Raphaëlle Lacasse	6–4, 6–1
Win	4–4	Jun 2021	ITF Porto, Portugal	W25	Hard	(Netherlands) Arianne Hartono	(Japan) Mana Ayukawa (Japan) Akiko Omae	7–5, 6–2
Win	5–4	Oct 2021	ITF Florence, United States	W25	Hard	(United Kingdom) Emily Appleton	(United States) Robin Anderson (United States) Elysia Bolton	6–3, 1–6, [10–8]
Win	6–4	Feb 2022	Open de l'Isère, France	W60	Hard (i)	(India) Prarthana Thombare	(United Kingdom) Alicia Barnett (United Kingdom) Olivia Nicholls	6–3, 6–3
Win	7–4	Aug 2023	ITF Roehampton, UK	W25	Hard	(Georgia (country)) Mariam Bolkvadze	(Australia) Talia Gibson (Australia) Petra Hule	7–5, 6–3
Win	8–4	Oct 2023	Open Nantes Atlantique, France	W60	Hard (i)	(United Kingdom) Ali Collins	(United Kingdom) Emily Appleton (Netherlands) Isabelle Haverlag	7–6^{(4)}, 6–2
Loss	8–5	Feb 2024	ITF Edgbaston, UK	W50	Hard (i)	(United Kingdom) Ali Collins	(Belgium) Magali Kempen (Belgium) Lara Salden	6–7^{(6)}, 2–6
Loss	8–6	Mar 2025	Branik Maribor Open, Slovenia	W75	Hard (i)	(France) Jessika Ponchet	(France) Julie Belgraver (Poland) Urszula Radwańska	1–6, 4–6
Loss	8–7	Apr 2025	Kangaroo Cup, Japan	W100	Hard	(United States) Emina Bektas	(Japan) Momoko Kobori (Japan) Ayano Shimizu	1–6, 2–6
