= 2024 GB Pro-Series Shrewsbury =

Tennis tournament

- Date: 14–20 October 2024
- Edition: 15th
- Category: ITF Women's World Tennis Tour
- Prize money: $100,000
- Surface: Hard / Indoor
- Location: Shrewsbury, United Kingdom

2023 Champions

Singles
- (Switzerland) Viktorija Golubic

Doubles
- (United Kingdom) Harriet Dart / (Australia) Olivia Gadecki
← 2023 ·	GB Pro-Series Shrewsbury	· 2025 →

The 2024 GB Pro-Series Shrewsbury is a professional tennis tournament played on indoor hard courts. It is the fifteenth edition of the tournament which was part of the 2024 ITF Women's World Tennis Tour. It took place in Shrewsbury, United Kingdom between 14 and 20 October 2024.

== Champions ==
=== Singles ===
- (United Kingdom) Sonay Kartal def. (United Kingdom) Heather Watson 7–5, 4–1 ret.

=== Doubles ===
- (United Kingdom) Amelia Rajecki / (United Kingdom) Mingge Xu def. (United Kingdom) Hannah Klugman / (United Kingdom) Ranah Stoiber 6–4, 6–1

== Singles main draw entrants ==
=== Seeds ===
Country	Player	Rank^{1}	Seed
ESP	Nuria Párrizas Díaz	80	1
FRA	Océane Dodin	94	2
GBR	Sonay Kartal	104	3
FRA	Chloé Paquet	108	4
SVK	Anna Karolína Schmiedlová	110	5
UKR	Daria Snigur	123	6
FRA	Elsa Jacquemot	147	7
AND	Victoria Jiménez Kasintseva	149	8

- ^{1} Rankings are as of 7 October 2024.

=== Other entrants ===
The following players received wildcards into the singles main draw:

- (United Kingdom) Amarni Banks
- (United Kingdom) Jodie Burrage
- (United Kingdom) Hannah Klugman
- (United Kingdom) Mingge Xu

The following players received entry from the qualifying draw:

- (United Kingdom) Emily Appleton
- (United Kingdom) Sarah Beth Grey
- (Czech Republic) Aneta Laboutková
- (Estonia) Elena Malõgina
- (Croatia) Petra Marčinko
- (Croatia) Iva Primorac
- (Germany) Nastasja Schunk
- (United Kingdom) Ranah Stoiber

The following player received entry as a lucky loser:

- (United Kingdom) Hephzibah Oluwadare
