= 2023 GB Pro-Series Shrewsbury =

Tennis tournament

- Date: 16–22 October 2023
- Edition: 14th
- Category: ITF Women's World Tennis Tour
- Prize money: $100,000
- Surface: Hard / Indoor
- Location: Shrewsbury, United Kingdom

Champions

Singles
- (Switzerland) Viktorija Golubic

Doubles
- (United Kingdom) Harriet Dart / (Australia) Olivia Gadecki
| ← 2022 · | GB Pro-Series Shrewsbury | · 2024 → |

The 2023 GB Pro-Series Shrewsbury is a professional tennis tournament played on indoor hard courts. It was the fourteenth edition of the tournament which was part of the 2023 ITF Women's World Tennis Tour. It took place in Shrewsbury, United Kingdom between 16 and 22 October 2023.

== Champions ==
=== Singles ===
- (Switzerland) Viktorija Golubic def. (United Kingdom) Amarni Banks, 6–0, 6–0

=== Doubles ===
- (United Kingdom) Harriet Dart / (Australia) Olivia Gadecki def. (Estonia) Elena Malõgina / (Czech Republic) Barbora Palicová, 6–0, 6–2

== Singles main draw entrants ==
=== Seeds ===
| Country | Player | Rank^{1} | Seed |
|---|---|---|---|
| SUI | Viktorija Golubic | 105 | 1 |
| FRA | Océane Dodin | 114 | 2 |
| AUS | Olivia Gadecki | 131 | 3 |
| GBR | Harriet Dart | 145 | 4 |
| HUN | Dalma Gálfi | 149 | 5 |
| GBR | Yuriko Miyazaki | 161 | 6 |
| FRA | Fiona Ferro | 175 | 7 |
| SUI | Simona Waltert | 178 | 8 |

- ^{1} Rankings are as of 9 October 2023.

=== Other entrants ===
The following players received wildcards into the singles main draw:

- (United Kingdom) Amarni Banks
- (United Kingdom) Katy Dunne
- (United Kingdom) Francesca Jones
- (United Kingdom) Isabelle Lacy

The following players received entry from the qualifying draw:

- (France) Nahia Berecoechea
- (Poland) Gina Feistel
- (Germany) Kathleen Kanev
- (United Kingdom) Hannah Klugman
- (France) Emma Léné
- (Lithuania) Andrė Lukošiūtė
- (Sweden) Kajsa Rinaldo Persson
- (Slovakia) Katarína Strešnáková

The following players received entry into the singles main draw using a special ranking:

- ~~(Georgia (country)) Mariam Bolkvadze~~
- Marina Melnikova

The following player received entry as a lucky loser:

- (Turkey) Pemra Özgen
