= 2024 GB Pro-Series Shrewsbury – Singles =

Singles
- 2024 GB Pro-Series Shrewsbury

Final
- Champion: (United Kingdom) Sonay Kartal
- Runner-up: (United Kingdom) Heather Watson
- Score: 7–5, 4–1 ret.

Events
Singles	Doubles
← 2023 ·	GB Pro-Series Shrewsbury	· 2025 →

Viktorija Golubic was the defending champion but chose not to participate.

Sonay Kartal won the title, after Heather Watson retired from the final down 7–5, 4–1.

== Seeds ==
1. (Spain) Nuria Párrizas Díaz (first round)
2. (France) Océane Dodin (semifinals, retired)
3. (United Kingdom) Sonay Kartal (champion)
4. (France) Chloé Paquet (quarterfinals)
5. (Slovakia) Anna Karolína Schmiedlová (first round)
6. (Ukraine) Daria Snigur (quarterfinals)
7. (France) Elsa Jacquemot (first round)
8. (Andorra) Victoria Jiménez Kasintseva (first round, retired)

== Draw ==
=== Key ===
- Q = Qualifier
- WC = Wild card
- LL = Lucky loser
- Alt = Alternate
- ITF = ITF entry
- PR = Protected ranking
- SR = Special ranking
- SE = Special exempt
- JE = Junior exempt
- JR = Junior Accelerator Programme entrant
- CO = College Accelerator Programme entrant
- NG = Next Gen Accelerator Program entrant
- w/o = Walkover
- r = Retired
- d = Defaulted

=== Finals ===
Semifinals
(Switzerland) Simona Waltert	3	6	2
(United Kingdom) Heather Watson	6	3	6
3	(United Kingdom) Sonay Kartal	7	2
2	(France) Océane Dodin	5	1^{r}

Final
(United Kingdom) Heather Watson	5	1^{r}
3	(United Kingdom) Sonay Kartal	7	4

=== Top half ===
First round
1	(Spain) N Párrizas Díaz	3	6	1
(Switzerland) S Waltert	6	3	6
Q	(United Kingdom) E Appleton	6	7^{7}
Q	(Czech Republic) A Laboutková	4	6^{5}
(France) K Mladenovic	1	3
WC	(United Kingdom) A Banks	6	6
(United Kingdom) E McDonald	0	1
6	(Ukraine) D Snigur	6	6
4	(France) C Paquet	6	6
(United Kingdom) A Rajecki	4	2
Q	(Germany) N Schunk	6	7^{7}
Q	(Croatia) I Primorac	4	6^{0}
Q	(Croatia) P Marčinko	7	1	5
Q	(United Kingdom) SB Grey	5	6	7
(United Kingdom) H Watson	6	6
5	(Slovakia) AK Schmiedlová	1	1

Second round
(Switzerland) S Waltert	4	7	6
Q	(United Kingdom) E Appleton	6	5	1
WC	(United Kingdom) A Banks	4	5
6	(Ukraine) D Snigur	6	7
4	(France) C Paquet	5	6	6
Q	(Germany) N Schunk	7	1	4
Q	(United Kingdom) SB Grey	6^{4}	3
(United Kingdom) H Watson	7^{7}	6

Quarterfinals
(Switzerland) S Waltert	6	6
6	(Ukraine) D Snigur	2	2
4	(France) C Paquet	6^{4}	3
(United Kingdom) H Watson	7^{7}	6

Semifinals
(Switzerland) S Waltert	3	6	2
(United Kingdom) H Watson	6	3	6

=== Bottom half ===
First round
8	(Andorra) V Jiménez Kasintseva	5	0^{r}
LL	(United Kingdom) H Oluwadare	7	2
Q	(United Kingdom) R Stoiber	2	4
WC	(United Kingdom) M Xu	6	6
(Switzerland) V Ryser	2	6	3
WC	(United Kingdom) J Burrage	6	4	6
WC	(United Kingdom) H Klugman	4	4
3	(United Kingdom) S Kartal	6	6
7	(France) E Jacquemot	3	6	4
O Selekhmeteva	6	3	6
Q	(Estonia) E Malõgina	6	6
(Germany) M Barthel	4	0
(France) L Jeanjean	6^{3}	6	4
(Spain) M Bassols Ribera	7^{7}	4	6
(Portugal) F Jorge	7^{8}	4	2
2	(France) O Dodin	6^{6}	6	6

Second round
LL	(United Kingdom) H Oluwadare	0	2
WC	(United Kingdom) M Xu	6	6
(United Kingdom) J Burrage	5	5
3	(United Kingdom) S Kartal	7	7
O Selekhmeteva	7	6
Q	(Estonia) E Malõgina	5	1
(Spain) M Bassols Ribera	6	1	1
2	(France) O Dodin	3	6	6

Quarterfinals
WC	(United Kingdom) M Xu	6^{6}	2
3	(United Kingdom) S Kartal	7^{8}	6
O Selekhmeteva	7^{7}	4	4
2	(France) O Dodin	6^{5}	6	6

Semifinals
3	(United Kingdom) S Kartal	7	2
2	(France) O Dodin	5	1^{r}
