= 2023 GB Pro-Series Shrewsbury – Singles =

Singles
- 2023 GB Pro-Series Shrewsbury

Final
- Champion: (Switzerland) Viktorija Golubic
- Runner-up: (United Kingdom) Amarni Banks
- Score: 6–0, 6–0

Events
Singles	Doubles
← 2022 ·	GB Pro-Series Shrewsbury	· 2024 →

Markéta Vondroušová is the defending champion but chose not to participate.

Viktorija Golubic won the title, defeating Amarni Banks in the final, 6–0, 6–0.

== Seeds ==
1. (Switzerland) Viktorija Golubic (champion)
2. (France) Océane Dodin (semifinals)
3. (Australia) Olivia Gadecki (quarterfinals)
4. (United Kingdom) Harriet Dart (second round)
5. (Hungary) Dalma Gálfi (first round)
6. (United Kingdom) Yuriko Miyazaki (second round)
7. (France) Fiona Ferro (first round)
8. (Switzerland) Simona Waltert (quarterfinals)

== Draw ==
=== Key ===
- Q = Qualifier
- WC = Wild card
- LL = Lucky loser
- Alt = Alternate
- SE = Special exempt
- PR = Protected ranking
- ITF = ITF entry
- JE = Junior exempt
- w/o = Walkover
- r = Retired
- d = Defaulted
- SR = Special ranking

=== Finals ===
Semifinals
1	(Switzerland) Viktorija Golubic	7	5	7
(Netherlands) Suzan Lamens	5	7	5
WC	(United Kingdom) Amarni Banks	7^{10}	6
2	(France) Océane Dodin	6^{8}	4

Final
1	(Switzerland) Viktorija Golubic	6	6
WC	(United Kingdom) Amarni Banks	0	0

=== Top half ===
First round
1	(Switzerland) V Golubic	6	6
WC	(United Kingdom) I Lacy	4	1
(Uzbekistan) N Abduraimova	6	6
(Czech Republic) G Knutson	1	2
WC	(United Kingdom) F Jones	7^{7}	4
Q	(France) E Léné	6^{5}	3^{r}
(Estonia) E Malõgina	6	6
7	(France) F Ferro	4	1
3	(Australia) O Gadecki	3	7^{7}	6
(France) M Rouvroy	6	6^{3}	4
(Spain) L Cortez Llorca	3	0
(Czech Republic) B Palicová	6	6
Q	(Sweden) K Rinaldo Persson	6	0	1
(Netherlands) S Lamens	1	6	6
(United Kingdom) K Swan	6	6
5	(Hungary) D Gálfi	2	2

Second round
1	(Switzerland) V Golubic	4	6	6
(Uzbekistan) N Abduraimova	6	2	1
WC	(United Kingdom) F Jones	3	6	7^{7}
(Estonia) E Malõgina	6	1	6^{3}
3	(Australia) O Gadecki	6	6
(Czech Republic) B Palicová	3	0
(Netherlands) S Lamens	7	6
(United Kingdom) K Swan	5	2

Quarterfinals
1	(Switzerland) V Golubic	4
WC	(United Kingdom) F Jones	3^{r}
3	(Australia) O Gadecki	2	4
(Netherlands) S Lamens	6	6

Semifinals
1	(Switzerland) V Golubic	7	5	7
(Netherlands) S Lamens	5	7	5

=== Bottom half ===
First round
8	(Switzerland) S Waltert	6	6
LL	(Turkey) P Özgen	1	4
Q	(Germany) K Kanev	6	6^{2}	4
Q	(Lithuania) A Lukošiūtė	2	7^{7}	6
WC	(United Kingdom) A Banks	6	6^{3}	6
WC	(United Kingdom) K Dunne	3	7^{7}	4
Q	(France) N Berecoechea	2	0
4	(United Kingdom) H Dart	6	6
6	(United Kingdom) Y Miyazaki	6	6
(United Kingdom) E Appleton	3	2
Q	(United Kingdom) H Klugman	6	7
Q	(Poland) G Feistel	3	5
SR	M Melnikova	6	6
(United Kingdom) A Brogan	3	4
Q	(Slovakia) K Strešnáková	0	3
2	(France) O Dodin	6	6

Second round
8	(Switzerland) S Waltert	7	7^{7}
Q	(Lithuania) A Lukošiūtė	5	6^{4}
WC	(United Kingdom) A Banks	7^{7}	6
4	(United Kingdom) H Dart	6^{3}	4
6	(United Kingdom) Y Miyazaki	6^{7}	6	2
Q	(United Kingdom) H Klugman	7^{9}	4	6
SR	M Melnikova	6	5	2
2	(France) O Dodin	4	7	6

Quarterfinals
8	(Switzerland) S Waltert	6	3	2
WC	(United Kingdom) A Banks	2	6	6
Q	(United Kingdom) H Klugman	5	6	2
2	(France) O Dodin	7	3	6

Semifinals
WC	(United Kingdom) A Banks	7^{10}	6
2	(France) O Dodin	6^{8}	4
