= 2024 GB Pro-Series Shrewsbury – Doubles =

Doubles
- 2024 GB Pro-Series Shrewsbury

Final
- Champions: (United Kingdom) Amelia Rajecki (United Kingdom) Mingge Xu
- Runners-up: (United Kingdom) Hannah Klugman (United Kingdom) Ranah Stoiber
- Score: 6–4, 6–1

Events
Singles	Doubles
← 2023 ·	GB Pro-Series Shrewsbury	· 2025 →

Harriet Dart and Olivia Gadecki were the defending champions but they chose not to participate.

Amelia Rajecki and Mingge Xu won the title, defeating Hannah Klugman and Ranah Stoiber in the final; 6–4, 6–1.

== Seeds ==
1. (Portugal) Francisca Jorge / (United Kingdom) Maia Lumsden (semifinals)
2. (United States) Jessie Aney / (Germany) Lena Papadakis (quarterfinals)
3. (United Kingdom) Freya Christie / (United Kingdom) Sarah Beth Grey (first round)
4. (United Kingdom) Alicia Barnett / (United Kingdom) Madeleine Brooks (quarterfinals)

== Draw ==
=== Key ===
- Q = Qualifier
- WC = Wild card
- LL = Lucky loser
- Alt = Alternate
- ITF = ITF entry
- PR = Protected ranking
- SR = Special ranking
- SE = Special exempt
- JE = Junior exempt
- JR = Junior Accelerator Programme entrant
- CO = College Accelerator Programme entrant
- NG = Next Gen Accelerator Program entrant
- w/o = Walkover
- r = Retired
- d = Defaulted

=== Draw ===
First round
(Italy) D Chiesa (Croatia) I Primorac	6	6
(Czech Republic) A Laboutková (United Kingdom) E Maloney	4	4
3	(United Kingdom) F Christie (United Kingdom) SB Grey	3	4
(Netherlands) I Haverlag (Switzerland) S Waltert	6	6
(Croatia) M Dražić (Estonia) E Malõgina	3	5
(United Kingdom) A Rajecki (United Kingdom) M Xu	6	7
(Germany) M Hodzic (Mexico) M Portillo Ramírez	6	5	[5]
M Melnikova (Netherlands) L Tran	4	7	[10]
(United Kingdom) H Hutchinson (United Kingdom) E McDonald	6^{3}	6	[4]
4	(United Kingdom) A Barnett (United Kingdom) M Brooks	7^{7}	4	[10]
(Switzerland) C Perrin (Switzerland) V Ryser	5	6	[5]
(United Kingdom) H Klugman (United Kingdom) R Stoiber	7	4	[10]

Quarterfinals
1	(Portugal) F Jorge (United Kingdom) M Lumsden	7	6
(Italy) D Chiesa (Croatia) I Primorac	5	4
(Netherlands) I Haverlag (Switzerland) S Waltert	2	0
(United Kingdom) A Rajecki (United Kingdom) M Xu	6	6
M Melnikova (Netherlands) L Tran	6	6^{6}	[10]
4	(United Kingdom) A Barnett (United Kingdom) M Brooks	4	7^{8}	[8]
(United Kingdom) H Klugman (United Kingdom) R Stoiber	5
2	(United States) J Aney (Germany) L Papadakis	4^{r}

Semifinals
1	(Portugal) F Jorge (United Kingdom) M Lumsden	5	6	[7]
(United Kingdom) A Rajecki (United Kingdom) M Xu	7	4	[10]
M Melnikova (Netherlands) L Tran	0	1
(United Kingdom) H Klugman (United Kingdom) R Stoiber	6	6

Final
(United Kingdom) A Rajecki (United Kingdom) M Xu	6	6
(United Kingdom) H Klugman (United Kingdom) R Stoiber	4	1
