= 2023 GB Pro-Series Shrewsbury – Doubles =

Doubles
- 2023 GB Pro-Series Shrewsbury

Final
- Champions: (United Kingdom) Harriet Dart (Australia) Olivia Gadecki
- Runners-up: (Estonia) Elena Malõgina (Czech Republic) Barbora Palicová
- Score: 6–0, 6–2

Events
Singles	Doubles
← 2022 ·	GB Pro-Series Shrewsbury	· 2024 →

Miriam Kolodziejová and Markéta Vondroušová are the defending champions but they chose not to participate.

Harriet Dart and Olivia Gadecki won the title, defeating Elena Malõgina and Barbora Palicová in the final, 6–0, 6–2.

== Seeds ==
1. (United Kingdom) Harriet Dart / (Australia) Olivia Gadecki (champions)
2. (United Kingdom) Emily Appleton / (Netherlands) Isabelle Haverlag (semifinals)
3. (Uzbekistan) Nigina Abduraimova / (France) Estelle Cascino (first round)
4. (Estonia) Elena Malõgina / (Czech Republic) Barbora Palicová (final)

== Draw ==
=== Key ===
- Q = Qualifier
- WC = Wild card
- LL = Lucky loser
- Alt = Alternate
- SE = Special exempt
- PR = Protected ranking
- ITF = ITF entry
- JE = Junior exempt
- w/o = Walkover
- r = Retired
- d = Defaulted
- SR = Special ranking

=== Draw ===
First round
1	(United Kingdom) H Dart (Australia) O Gadecki	6	3	[10]
(Georgia (country)) M Bolkvadze (United Kingdom) Y Miyazaki	1	6	[6]
(Netherlands) S Lamens; M Melnikova	4	6	[10]
(Hungary) A Nagy (Romania) AG Vasilescu	6	0	[6]
3	(Uzbekistan) N Abduraimova (France) E Cascino	1	6	[4]
(United Kingdom) M Brooks (United Kingdom) H Hutchinson	6	3	[10]
WC	(United Kingdom) O Cooper (United Kingdom) A Reayer	w/o
(Netherlands) M Hoedt (France) E Léné
WC	(United Kingdom) A Banks (United Kingdom) S Murray Sharan	6	6
(Slovakia) K Strešnáková (United Kingdom) E Webley-Smith	4	0
WC	(Lithuania) A Lukošiūtė (United Kingdom) E Maloney	6	3	[5]
4	(Estonia) E Malõgina (Czech Republic) B Palicová	4	6	[10]
(Germany) K Kanev (Czech Republic) A Laboutková	7^{7}	7
Alt	(France) N Berecoechea (Poland) G Feistel	6^{5}	5
(Sweden) K Rinaldo Persson (Germany) A Wirges	2	6^{3}
2	(United Kingdom) E Appleton (Netherlands) I Haverlag	6	7^{7}

Quarterfinals
1	(United Kingdom) H Dart (Australia) O Gadecki	2	7	[10]
(Netherlands) S Lamens; M Melnikova	6	5	[8]
(United Kingdom) M Brooks (United Kingdom) H Hutchinson	6	6
WC	(United Kingdom) O Cooper (United Kingdom) A Reayer	3	1
WC	(United Kingdom) A Banks (United Kingdom) S Murray Sharan	4	2
4	(Estonia) E Malõgina (Czech Republic) B Palicová	6	6
(Germany) K Kanev (Czech Republic) A Laboutková	6^{3}	3
2	(United Kingdom) E Appleton (Netherlands) I Haverlag	7^{7}	6

Semifinals
1	(United Kingdom) H Dart (Australia) O Gadecki	6	6
(United Kingdom) M Brooks (United Kingdom) H Hutchinson	0	3
4	(Estonia) E Malõgina (Czech Republic) B Palicová	6	6^{0}	[10]
2	(United Kingdom) E Appleton (Netherlands) I Haverlag	3	7^{7}	[6]

Final
1	(United Kingdom) H Dart (Australia) O Gadecki	6	6
4	(Estonia) E Malõgina (Czech Republic) B Palicová	0	2
