= 2026 Qatar TotalEnergies Open – Singles =

Singles
- 2026 Qatar TotalEnergies Open

Final
- Champion: (Czech Republic) Karolína Muchová
- Runner-up: (Canada) Victoria Mboko
- Score: 6–4, 7–5

Details
- Draw: 56
- Seeds: 16

Events
Singles	Doubles
- WTA Qatar Open

Karolína Muchová defeated Victoria Mboko in the final, 6–4, 7–5 to win the singles tennis title at the 2026 WTA Qatar Open. It was her first WTA 1000 title, second WTA Tour title overall, and first title since 2019. By reaching the final, Mboko made her top 10 debut in the WTA rankings.

Amanda Anisimova was the defending champion, but retired from her second round match against Karolína Plíšková.

== Seeds ==
The top eight seeds received a bye into the second round.

1. (Poland) Iga Świątek (quarterfinals)
2. (Kazakhstan) Elena Rybakina (quarterfinals)
3. (United States) Amanda Anisimova (second round, retired)
4. (United States) Coco Gauff (second round)
5. Mirra Andreeva (third round)
6. (Italy) Jasmine Paolini (second round)
7. (Ukraine) Elina Svitolina (third round)
8. Ekaterina Alexandrova (second round)
9. (Czech Republic) Linda Nosková (second round)
10. (Canada) Victoria Mboko (final)
11. (Denmark) Clara Tauson (first round)
12. (United States) Emma Navarro (second round)
13. Liudmila Samsonova (first round)
14. (Czech Republic) Karolína Muchová (champion)
15. Diana Shnaider (first round)
16. (Belgium) Elise Mertens (second round)

Click on the seed number of a player to go to their draw section.

== Draw ==
Key

- Q = Qualifier
- WC = Wild card
- LL = Lucky loser
- Alt = Alternate
- ITF = ITF entry
- PR = Protected ranking
- SR = Special ranking
- SE = Special exempt
- JE = Junior exempt
- JR = Junior Accelerator Programme entrant
- CO = College Accelerator Programme entrant
- NG = Next Gen Accelerator Program entrant
- w/o = Walkover
- r = Retired
- d = Defaulted

=== Finals ===
Quarterfinals
1	(Poland) Iga Świątek	6	4	5
(Greece) Maria Sakkari	2	6	7
14	(Czech Republic) Karolína Muchová	6	6
Anna Kalinskaya	3	4
(Latvia) Jeļena Ostapenko	7	6
LL	(Italy) Elisabetta Cocciaretto	5	4
10	(Canada) Victoria Mboko	7	4	6
2	(Kazakhstan) Elena Rybakina	5	6	4

Semifinals
(Greece) Maria Sakkari	6	4	1
14	(Czech Republic) Karolína Muchová	3	6	6
(Latvia) Jeļena Ostapenko	3	2
10	(Canada) Victoria Mboko	6	6

Final
14	(Czech Republic) Karolína Muchová	6	7
10	(Canada) Victoria Mboko	4	5

=== Top half ===
==== Section 1 ====
First round
WC	(Indonesia) J Tjen	6	6
LL	(Brazil) B Haddad Maia	0	1
(Australia) D Kasatkina	4	6	6
Q	(Japan) M Uchijima	6	3	0
A Pavlyuchenkova	2	1
16	(Belgium) E Mertens	6	6
9	(Czech Republic) L Nosková	6	6
(Australia) M Joint	4	0
(Germany) L Siegemund	6^{3}	4
Q	(France) V Gracheva	7^{7}	6
(Greece) M Sakkari	6	6
WC	(Turkey) Z Sönmez	1	3

Second round
1	(Poland) I Świątek	6	6
WC	(Indonesia) J Tjen	0	3
(Australia) D Kasatkina	6	6
16	(Belgium) E Mertens	4	0
9	(Czech Republic) L Nosková	2	6	5
Q	(France) V Gracheva	6	2	7
(Greece) M Sakkari	6	6
6	(Italy) J Paolini	4	2

Third round
1	(Poland) I Świątek	5	6	6
(Australia) D Kasatkina	7	1	1
Q	(France) V Gracheva	6^{3}	0
(Greece) M Sakkari	7^{7}	6

Quarterfinals
1	(Poland) I Świątek	6	4	5
(Greece) M Sakkari	2	6	7

==== Section 2 ====
First round
LL	(Argentina) S Sierra	1	2
PR	(Czech Republic) Ka Plíšková	6	6
(Philippines) A Eala	6^{6}	1
Q	(Czech Republic) T Valentová	7^{8}	6
(Romania) J Cristian	2	3
14	(Czech Republic) K Muchová	6	6
12	(United States) E Navarro	7	6
(Germany) T Maria	5	1
A Kalinskaya	6	6
(Spain) J Bouzas Maneiro	2	1
(Ukraine) D Yastremska	6	4	7^{7}
(Spain) C Bucșa	4	6	6^{5}

Second round
3	(United States) A Anisimova	7	6^{3}	1^{r}
PR	(Czech Republic) Ka Plíšková	5	7^{7}	4
Q	(Czech Republic) T Valentová	1	4
14	(Czech Republic) K Muchová	6	6
12	(United States) E Navarro	5	6	2
A Kalinskaya	7	2	6
(Ukraine) D Yastremska	1	4
7	(Ukraine) E Svitolina	6	6

Third round
PR	(Czech Republic) Ka Plíšková	2^{r}
14	(Czech Republic) K Muchová	5
A Kalinskaya	6	6
7	(Ukraine) E Svitolina	4	3

Quarterfinals
14	(Czech Republic) K Muchová	6	6
A Kalinskaya	3	4

=== Bottom half ===
==== Section 3 ====
First round
Q	A Zakharova	7^{7}	3	4
(Latvia) J Ostapenko	6^{5}	6	6
(United Kingdom) E Raducanu	6	4	0^{r}
Q	(Colombia) C Osorio	2	6	2
(Czech Republic) K Siniaková	6	6
11	(Denmark) C Tauson	4	1
13	L Samsonova	3	6	6^{7}
LL	(Poland) M Fręch	6	4	7^{9}
(United States) A Li	6	6
(Canada) L Fernandez	4	3
LL	(Italy) E Cocciaretto	7^{7}	6
WC	(France) E Jacquemot	6^{4}	2

Second round
8	E Alexandrova	4	2
(Latvia) J Ostapenko	6	6
Q	(Colombia) C Osorio	6	5	6
(Czech Republic) K Siniaková	2	7	3
LL	(Poland) M Fręch	3	4
(United States) A Li	6	6
LL	(Italy) E Cocciaretto	6	6
4	(United States) C Gauff	4	2

Third round
(Latvia) J Ostapenko	6	6
Q	(Colombia) C Osorio	3	1
(United States) A Li	6^{5}	7	4
LL	(Italy) E Cocciaretto	7^{7}	5	6

Quarterfinals
(Latvia) J Ostapenko	7	6
LL	(Italy) E Cocciaretto	5	4

==== Section 4 ====
First round
Q	(United Kingdom) S Kartal	4	6	3
(Poland) M Linette	6	3	6
WC	(United States) P Stearns	6	2	3
Q	V Zvonareva	2	6	6
(Czech Republic) M Bouzková	5	2
10	(Canada) V Mboko	7	6
15	D Shnaider	6	4	6^{5}
Q	(United States) A Parks	1	6	7^{7}
(China) Q Zheng	4	6	6
(United States) S Kenin	6	1	2
(China) Xin Wang	6	7
(Colombia) E Arango	1	5

Second round
5	M Andreeva	7^{7}	6
(Poland) M Linette	6^{0}	1
Q	V Zvonareva	4	4
10	(Canada) V Mboko	6	6
Q	(United States) A Parks	6^{4}	6	2
(China) Q Zheng	7^{7}	3	6
(China) Xin Wang	2	4
2	(Kazakhstan) E Rybakina	6	6

Third round
5	M Andreeva	3	6	6^{5}
10	(Canada) V Mboko	6	3	7^{7}
(China) Q Zheng	6	2	5
2	(Kazakhstan) E Rybakina	4	6	7

Quarterfinals
10	(Canada) V Mboko	7	4	6
2	(Kazakhstan) E Rybakina	5	6	4

== Seeded players ==
The following are the seeded players. Seedings are based on WTA rankings as of 2 February 2026. Rankings and points before are as of 9 February 2026.

^{‡}	Champion
^{†}	Runner-up

Seed	Rank	Player	Points before	Points dropping	Points won	Points after	Status
1	2	(Poland) Iga Świątek	7,978	390	215	7,803	Quarterfinals lost to (Greece) Maria Sakkari
2	3	(Kazakhstan) Elena Rybakina	7,523	215	215	7,523	Quarterfinals lost to (Canada) Victoria Mboko [10]
3	4	(United States) Amanda Anisimova	6,680	1,000	10	5,690	Second round retired against (Czech Republic) Karolína Plíšková [PR]
4	5	(United States) Coco Gauff	6,423	10	10	6,423	Second round lost to (Italy) Elisabetta Cocciaretto [LL]
5	7	Mirra Andreeva	4,731	65	120	4,786	Third round lost to (Canada) Victoria Mboko [10]
6	8	(Italy) Jasmine Paolini	4,267	120	10	4,157	Second round lost to (Greece) Maria Sakkari
7	9	(Ukraine) Elina Svitolina	3,205	65	120	3,260	Third round lost to Anna Kalinskaya
8	10	Ekaterina Alexandrova	3,200	390	(108)^{§}	2,918	Second round lost to (Latvia) Jeļena Ostapenko
9	12	(Czech Republic) Linda Nosková	2,626	120	65	2,571	Second round lost to (France) Varvara Gracheva [Q]
10	13	(Canada) Victoria Mboko^{†}	2,606	(10)^{∆}	650	3,246	Runner-up, lost to (Czech Republic) Karolína Muchová [14]
11	14	(Denmark) Clara Tauson	2,530	10	10	2,530	First round lost to (Czech Republic) Kateřina Siniaková
12	18	(United States) Emma Navarro	2,095	(60)^{∆}	65	2,100	Second round lost to Anna Kalinskaya
13	17	Liudmila Samsonova	2,116	65	(54)^{§}	2,105	First round lost to (Poland) Magdalena Fręch [LL]
14	19	(Czech Republic) Karolína Muchová^{‡}	2,058	0	1,000	3,058	Champion, defeated (Canada) Victoria Mboko [10]
15	21	Diana Shnaider	1,953	(60)	(60)^{Ω}	1,953	First round lost to (United States) Alycia Parks [Q]
16	22	(Belgium) Elise Mertens	1,936	120	65	1,881	Second round lost to (Australia) Daria Kasatkina

∆ The player is defending points from her 18th best result.
Ω The player is keeping her 18th best result as it is higher than the Doha result, which does not need to be counted in her ranking points.
§ The player is substituting her next best result as it is higher than the Doha result, which does not need to be counted in her ranking points.

=== Withdrawn seeded players ===
The following players would have been seeded, but withdrew before the tournament began.

Rank	Player	Points before	Points defending	Points after	Withdrawal reason
1	Aryna Sabalenka	10,990	0	10,990	Fatigue
6	(United States) Jessica Pegula	6,103	215	5,888	Fatigue
11	(Switzerland) Belinda Bencic	2,843	0	2,843	Illness
15	(Japan) Naomi Osaka	2,366	(10)^{∆}	2,356	Abdominal injury
16	(United States) Madison Keys	2,351	0	2,351	Fatigue

∆ The player is defending points from her 18th best result.

== Other entry information ==
=== Wildcards ===
- (France) Elsa Jacquemot
- (Turkey) Zeynep Sönmez
- (United States) Peyton Stearns
- (Indonesia) Janice Tjen

=== Protected ranking ===
- ~~(Czech Republic) Barbora Krejčiková~~
- (Czech Republic) Karolína Plíšková

=== Withdrawals ===
- § (Spain) Paula Badosa → replaced by (Argentina) Solana Sierra (LL)
- ‡ (Switzerland) Belinda Bencic → replaced by (Poland) Magda Linette
- ‡ (France) Loïs Boisson → replaced by (Spain) Cristina Bucșa
- § (Romania) Sorana Cîrstea → replaced by (Brazil) Beatriz Haddad Maia (LL)
- ‡ (United States) Iva Jovic → replaced by (Czech Republic) Kateřina Siniaková
- § (United States) McCartney Kessler → replaced by (Italy) Elisabetta Cocciaretto (LL)
- ‡ (United States) Madison Keys → replaced by (Germany) Laura Siegemund
- ‡ (Ukraine) Marta Kostyuk → replaced by (Czech Republic) Marie Bouzková
- § (Czech Republic) Barbora Krejčiková → replaced by (Poland) Magdalena Fręch (LL)
- ‡ Veronika Kudermetova → replaced by (Philippines) Alexandra Eala
- ‡ (Germany) Eva Lys → replaced by Anastasia Pavlyuchenkova
- ‡ (Japan) Naomi Osaka → replaced by (China) Wang Xinyu
- ‡ (United States) Jessica Pegula → replaced by (Australia) Daria Kasatkina
- ‡ Aryna Sabalenka → replaced by (Colombia) Emiliana Arango
- ‡ (Czech Republic) Markéta Vondroušová → replaced by (Greece) Maria Sakkari

‡ – withdrew from entry list
§ – withdrew from main draw

== Qualifying ==
=== Seeds ===
1. (Czech Republic) Tereza Valentová (qualified)
2. (Italy) Elisabetta Cocciaretto (qualifying competition, lucky loser)
3. (United States) Hailey Baptiste (withdrew, still playing in Abu Dhabi)
4. (Poland) Magdalena Fręch (qualifying competition, lucky loser)
5. (United Kingdom) Sonay Kartal (qualified)
6. (Argentina) Solana Sierra (qualifying competition, lucky loser)
7. (Croatia) Antonia Ružić (first round)
8. (Brazil) Beatriz Haddad Maia (qualifying competition, lucky loser)
9. (France) Varvara Gracheva (qualified)
10. (Austria) Julia Grabher (first round)
11. (Colombia) Camila Osorio (qualified)
12. (Slovakia) Rebecca Šramková (first round)
13. (China) Zhang Shuai (first round)
14. (Germany) Ella Seidel (qualifying competition)
15. (Australia) Kimberly Birrell (qualifying competition)
16. (United States) Alycia Parks (qualified)

=== Qualifiers ===
1. (Czech Republic) Tereza Valentová
2. (France) Varvara Gracheva
3. (Colombia) Camila Osorio
4. Vera Zvonareva
5. (United Kingdom) Sonay Kartal
6. (United States) Alycia Parks
7. (Japan) Moyuka Uchijima
8. Anastasia Zakharova

=== Lucky losers ===
1. (Poland) Magdalena Fręch
2. (Argentina) Solana Sierra
3. (Italy) Elisabetta Cocciaretto
4. (Brazil) Beatriz Haddad Maia

=== Qualifying draw ===
==== First qualifier ====
First round
1	(Czech Republic) Tereza Valentová	6	2	7^{7}
(Australia) Arina Rodionova	2	6	6^{3}
(Poland) Katarzyna Kawa	6	4	1
14	(Germany) Ella Seidel	2	6	6

Qualifying competition
1	(Czech Republic) Tereza Valentová	3	6	6
14	(Germany) Ella Seidel	6	2	4

==== Second qualifier ====
First round
2	(Italy) Elisabetta Cocciaretto	4	6	6
(Georgia (country)) Ekaterine Gorgodze	6	4	2
Aliaksandra Sasnovich	4	0
9	(France) Varvara Gracheva	6	6

Qualifying competition
2	(Italy) Elisabetta Cocciaretto	2	1
9	(France) Varvara Gracheva	6	6

==== Third qualifier ====
First round
Alt	(Serbia) Aleksandra Krunić	3	4
(Australia) Storm Hunter	6	6
(Australia) Priscilla Hon	6	2	1
11	(Colombia) Camila Osorio	4	6	6

Qualifying competition
(Australia) Storm Hunter	1	5
11	(Colombia) Camila Osorio	6	7

==== Fourth qualifier ====
First round
4	(Poland) Magdalena Fręch	7	6
WC	(Turkey) Berfu Cengiz	5	0
PR	Vera Zvonareva	6	6
13	(China) Zhang Shuai	3	3

Qualifying competition
4	(Poland) Magdalena Fręch	3	6^{1}
PR	Vera Zvonareva	6	7^{7}

==== Fifth qualifier ====
First round
5	(United Kingdom) Sonay Kartal	7	2	6
(Switzerland) Simona Waltert	5	6	4
(Mexico) Renata Zarazúa	2	2
15	(Australia) Kimberly Birrell	6	6

Qualifying competition
5	(United Kingdom) Sonay Kartal	7	6
15	(Australia) Kimberly Birrell	5	3

==== Sixth qualifier ====
First round
6	(Argentina) Solana Sierra	6	6
WC	(Qatar) Hind Al-Mudahka	1	0
(Switzerland) Rebeka Masarova	6	0	3
16	(United States) Alycia Parks	4	6	6

Qualifying competition
6	(Argentina) Solana Sierra	5	3
16	(United States) Alycia Parks	7	6

==== Seventh qualifier ====
First round
7	(Croatia) Antonia Ružić	2	2
(Ukraine) Yuliia Starodubtseva	6	6
(Japan) Moyuka Uchijima	4	7^{7}	6
12	(Slovakia) Rebecca Šramková	6	6^{4}	2

Qualifying competition
(Ukraine) Yuliia Starodubtseva	6	4	4
(Japan) Moyuka Uchijima	2	6	6

==== Eighth qualifier ====
First round
8/WC	(Brazil) Beatriz Haddad Maia	6	6
WC	(Qatar) Mubaraka Al-Naimi	0	0
Anastasia Zakharova	6	6
10	(Austria) Julia Grabher	4	4

Qualifying competition
8/WC	(Brazil) Beatriz Haddad Maia	4	4
Anastasia Zakharova	6	6
