= 2025 Wimbledon Championships – Women's singles =

Tennis championship

Ladies' singles
- 2025 Wimbledon Championships

Final
- Champion: (Poland) Iga Świątek
- Runner-up: (United States) Amanda Anisimova
- Score: 6–0, 6–0
- Date: 12 July 2025

Details
- Draw: 128 (16Q / 8WC)
- Seeds: 32

Events
Singles	men	women		boys	girls
Doubles	men	women	mixed	boys	girls
WC Singles	men	women	quad
WC Doubles	men	women	quad
14&U Singles	boys	girls
Legends	men	women	mixed

Qualification
Singles	men	women
- Wimbledon Championships

Iga Świątek defeated Amanda Anisimova in the final, 6–0, 6–0 to win the ladies' singles tennis title at the 2025 Wimbledon Championships. It was her first Wimbledon title and sixth major title overall. Świątek became the first Pole to win a Wimbledon singles title. This was only the third major final, and the second in the Open Era, to end in a "double bagel" scoreline (after the 1911 Wimbledon Championships and 1988 French Open). Świątek was the eighth woman in the Open Era to win major singles titles on all three surfaces – clay, grass and hardcourt. She was the fifth player overall, and fourth in the Open Era (after Ann Jones, Martina Hingis, Amélie Mauresmo and Ashleigh Barty) to win the women's singles title after previously winning the girls' singles title. By reaching the final, Anisimova made her debut in the top ten of the WTA rankings.

Barbora Krejčíková was the defending champion, but lost in the third round to Emma Navarro. The losses of Elena Rybakina and Krejčíková in the third round guaranteed a first-time Wimbledon champion for the eighth consecutive edition. For the first time in the Open Era, none of the quarterfinalists had previously reached the Wimbledon final.

With the losses of second seed Coco Gauff and third seed Jessica Pegula in the first round, this was the first time in the Open Era that two of the top three women's seeds lost in the first round of a major.

Zeynep Sönmez became the first Turkish player in the Open Era to reach the third round of a major. Solana Sierra became the first lucky loser to reach the women's singles fourth round at Wimbledon in the Open Era, and the seventh woman overall to do so at any major.

This marked the final Wimbledon appearance of former world No. 2 and two-time Wimbledon champion Petra Kvitová. She lost in the first round to Navarro.

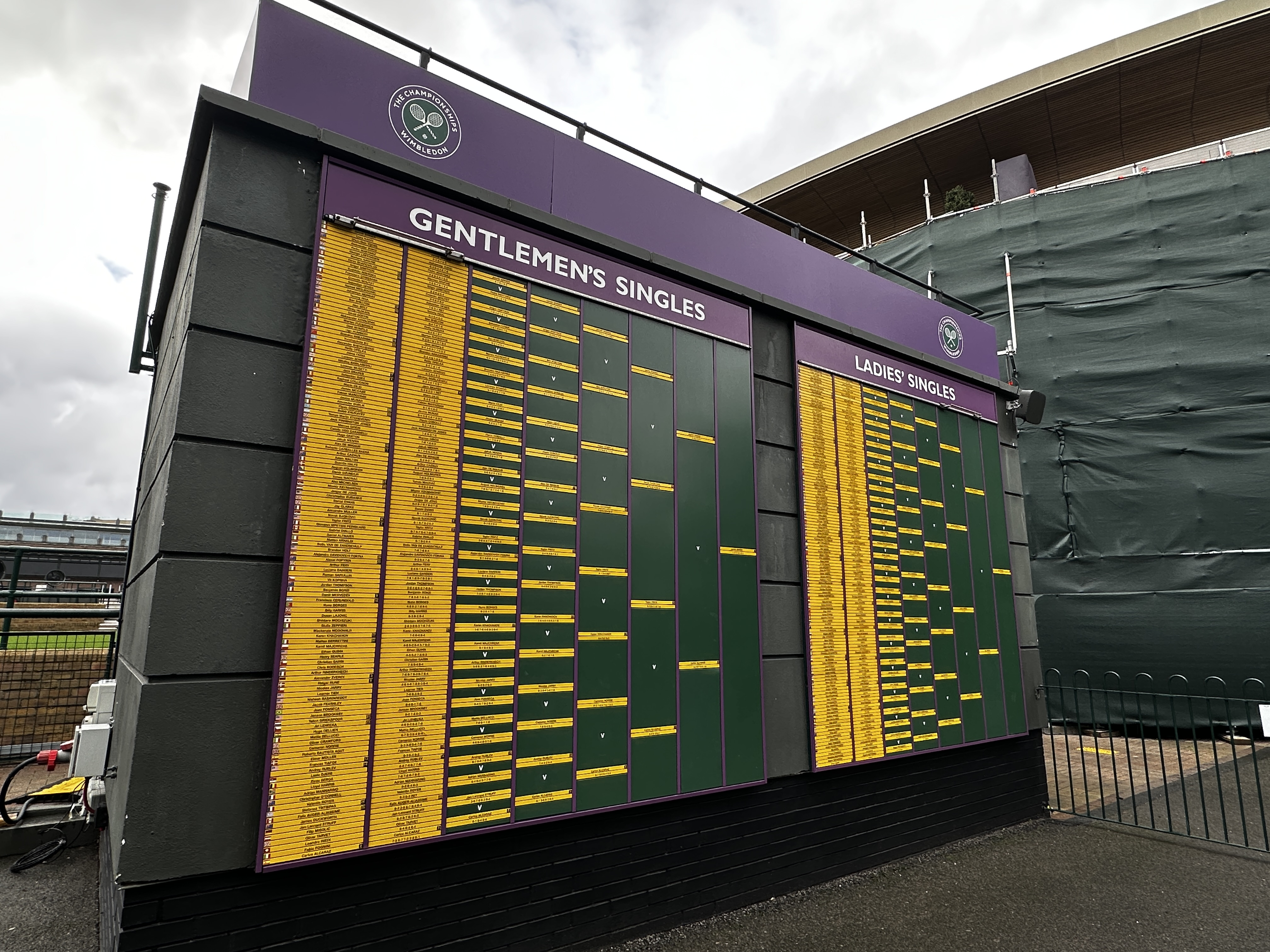
2025 Ladies' and Gentlemen's singles Wimbledon Championships draws and scoreboards

== Seeds ==
1. Aryna Sabalenka (semifinals)
2. (United States) Coco Gauff (first round)
3. (United States) Jessica Pegula (first round)
4. (Italy) Jasmine Paolini (second round)
5. (China) Zheng Qinwen (first round)
6. (United States) Madison Keys (third round)
7. Mirra Andreeva (quarterfinals)
8. (Poland) Iga Świątek (champion)
9. (Spain) Paula Badosa (first round)
10. (United States) Emma Navarro (fourth round)
11. (Kazakhstan) Elena Rybakina (third round)
12. Diana Shnaider (second round)
13. (United States) Amanda Anisimova (final)
14. (Ukraine) Elina Svitolina (third round)
15. (Czech Republic) Karolína Muchová (first round)
16. (Australia) Daria Kasatkina (third round)
17. (Czech Republic) Barbora Krejčíková (third round)
18. Ekaterina Alexandrova (fourth round)
19. Liudmila Samsonova (quarterfinals)
20. (Latvia) Jeļena Ostapenko (first round)
21. (Brazil) Beatriz Haddad Maia (second round)
22. (Croatia) Donna Vekić (second round)
23. (Denmark) Clara Tauson (fourth round)
24. (Belgium) Elise Mertens (fourth round)
25. (Poland) Magdalena Fręch (first round)
26. (Ukraine) Marta Kostyuk (first round)
27. (Poland) Magda Linette (first round)
28. (United States) Sofia Kenin (second round)
29. (Canada) Leylah Fernandez (second round)
30. (Czech Republic) Linda Nosková (fourth round)
31. (United States) Ashlyn Krueger (second round)
32. (United States) McCartney Kessler (first round)

== Draw ==
Key

- Q = Qualifier
- WC = Wild card
- LL = Lucky loser
- Alt = Alternate
- ITF = ITF entry
- PR = Protected ranking
- SR = Special ranking
- SE = Special exempt
- JE = Junior exempt
- JR = Junior Accelerator Programme entrant
- CO = College Accelerator Programme entrant
- NG = Next Gen Accelerator Program entrant
- w/o = Walkover
- r = Retired
- d = Defaulted

=== Finals ===
Quarterfinals
1	Aryna Sabalenka	4	6	6
(Germany) Laura Siegemund	6	2	4
13	(United States) Amanda Anisimova	6	7^{11}
Anastasia Pavlyuchenkova	1	6^{9}
7	Mirra Andreeva	6^{3}	6^{2}
(Switzerland) Belinda Bencic	7^{7}	7^{7}
8	(Poland) Iga Świątek	6	7
19	Liudmila Samsonova	2	5

Semifinals
1	Aryna Sabalenka	4	6	4
13	(United States) Amanda Anisimova	6	4	6
(Switzerland) Belinda Bencic	2	0
8	(Poland) Iga Świątek	6	6

Final
13	(United States) Amanda Anisimova	0	0
8	(Poland) Iga Świątek	6	6

=== Top half ===
==== Section 1 ====
First round
1	A Sabalenka	6	7
Q	(Canada) C Branstine	1	5
(New Zealand) L Sun	4	4
(Czech Republic) M Bouzková	6	6
(United Kingdom) E Raducanu	6	6
WC	(United Kingdom) M Xu	3	3
(Czech Republic) M Vondroušová	6	7^{7}
32	(United States) M Kessler	1	6^{3}
24	(Belgium) E Mertens	6	6
Q	(Czech Republic) L Fruhvirtová	4	2
(United States) A Li	6	4	6
(Switzerland) V Golubic	3	6	1
(France) V Gracheva	4	7^{7}	6^{8}
Q	A Sasnovich	6	6^{5}	7^{10}
(Hungary) A Bondár	3	1
14	(Ukraine) E Svitolina	6	6

Second round
1	A Sabalenka	7^{7}	6
(Czech Republic) M Bouzková	6^{4}	4
(United Kingdom) E Raducanu	6	6
(Czech Republic) M Vondroušová	3	3
24	(Belgium) E Mertens	6^{5}	6	6
(United States) A Li	7^{7}	1	2
Q	A Sasnovich	2	4
14	(Ukraine) E Svitolina	6	6

Third round
1	A Sabalenka	7^{8}	6
(United Kingdom) E Raducanu	6^{6}	4
24	(Belgium) E Mertens	6	7^{7}
14	(Ukraine) E Svitolina	1	6^{4}

Fourth round
1	A Sabalenka	6	7^{7}
24	(Belgium) E Mertens	4	6^{4}

==== Section 2 ====
First round
9	(Spain) P Badosa	2	6	4
(United Kingdom) K Boulter	6	3	6
LL	(Argentina) S Sierra	6	7^{10}
(Australia) O Gadecki	2	6^{8}
(Romania) A Todoni	4	4
(Spain) C Bucșa	6	6
(Australia) K Birrell	0	4
22	(Croatia) D Vekić	6	6
29	(Canada) L Fernandez	6	6
WC	(United Kingdom) H Klugman	1	3
(United States) P Stearns	4	2
(Germany) L Siegemund	6	6
(Serbia) O Danilović	6	6
Q	(China) S Zhang	2	4
(Romania) E-G Ruse	7^{7}	5	5
6	(United States) M Keys	6^{4}	7	7

Second round
(United Kingdom) K Boulter	7^{9}	2	1
LL	(Argentina) S Sierra	6^{7}	6	6
(Spain) C Bucșa	6	6
22	(Croatia) D Vekić	1	3
29	(Canada) L Fernandez	2	3
(Germany) L Siegemund	6	6
(Serbia) O Danilović	4	2
6	(United States) M Keys	6	6

Third round
LL	(Argentina) S Sierra	7	1	6
(Spain) C Bucșa	5	6	1
(Germany) L Siegemund	6	6
6	(United States) M Keys	3	3

Fourth round
LL	(Argentina) S Sierra	3	2
(Germany) L Siegemund	6	6

==== Section 3 ====
First round
4	(Italy) J Paolini	2	6	6
PR	(Latvia) A Sevastova	6	3	2
K Rakhimova	5	6	6
(Japan) A Ito	7	3	2
(Germany) E Lys	6	5	6
(China) Y Yuan	4	7	2
(United States) B Pera	2	4
30	(Czech Republic) L Nosková	6	6
21	(Brazil) B Haddad Maia	7^{9}	6
(Slovakia) R Šramková	6^{7}	4
WC	(United Kingdom) H Dart	6	3	5
(Hungary) D Gálfi	3	6	7
PR	(Belgium) Y Wickmayer	0	3
(Mexico) R Zarazúa	6	6
(Kazakhstan) Y Putintseva	0	0
13	(United States) A Anisimova	6	6

Second round
4	(Italy) J Paolini	6	4	4
K Rakhimova	4	6	6
(Germany) E Lys	2	6	3
30	(Czech Republic) L Nosková	6	2	6
21	(Brazil) B Haddad Maia	6^{7}	1
(Hungary) D Gálfi	7^{9}	6
(Mexico) R Zarazúa	4	3
13	(United States) A Anisimova	6	6

Third round
K Rakhimova	6^{6}	5
30	(Czech Republic) L Nosková	7^{8}	7
(Hungary) D Gálfi	3	7	3
13	(United States) A Anisimova	6	5	6

Fourth round
30	(Czech Republic) L Nosková	2	7	4
13	(United States) A Anisimova	6	5	6

==== Section 4 ====
First round
12	D Shnaider	7^{7}	6
(Japan) M Uchijima	6^{5}	3
Q	(France) D Parry	4	6	6
Q	(Croatia) P Martić	6	3	2
(Bulgaria) V Tomova	7^{7}	2
(Tunisia) O Jabeur	6^{5}	0^{r}
(United Kingdom) S Kartal	7	2	6
20	(Latvia) J Ostapenko	5	6	2
31	(United States) A Krueger	6	6
WC	(United Kingdom) M Stojsavljevic	3	2
A Pavlyuchenkova	4	6	6
(Australia) A Tomljanović	6	3	2
(Japan) N Osaka	6	7^{7}
Q	(Australia) T Gibson	4	6^{4}
(Czech Republic) K Siniaková	7	4	6
5	(China) Q Zheng	5	6	1

Second round
12	D Shnaider	4	1
Q	(France) D Parry	6	6
(Bulgaria) V Tomova	2	2
(United Kingdom) S Kartal	6	6
31	(United States) A Krueger	6^{4}	4
A Pavlyuchenkova	7^{7}	6
(Japan) N Osaka	6	6
(Czech Republic) K Siniaková	3	2

Third round
Q	(France) D Parry	4	2
(United Kingdom) S Kartal	6	6
A Pavlyuchenkova	3	6	6
(Japan) N Osaka	6	4	4

Fourth round
(United Kingdom) S Kartal	6^{3}	4
A Pavlyuchenkova	7^{7}	6

=== Bottom half ===
==== Section 5 ====
First round
7	M Andreeva	6	6
(Egypt) M Sherif	3	3
(Switzerland) J Teichmann	4	5
(Italy) L Bronzetti	6	7
(United States) H Baptiste	6^{0}	6	6
PR	(Romania) S Cîrstea	7^{7}	1	2
LL	(Canada) V Mboko	6	6
25	(Poland) M Fręch	3	2
17	(Czech Republic) B Krejčíková	3	6	6
(Philippines) A Eala	6	2	1
(United States) C Dolehide	6	6
(Netherlands) A Rus	2	2
V Kudermetova	6	6
PR	(China) L Zhu	3	2
WC	(Czech Republic) P Kvitová	3	1
10	(United States) E Navarro	6	6

Second round
7	M Andreeva	6	7^{7}
(Italy) L Bronzetti	1	6^{4}
(United States) H Baptiste	7^{8}	6
LL	(Canada) V Mboko	6^{6}	3
17	(Czech Republic) B Krejčíková	6	3	6
(United States) C Dolehide	4	6	2
V Kudermetova	1	2
10	(United States) E Navarro	6	6

Third round
7	M Andreeva	6	6
(United States) H Baptiste	1	3
17	(Czech Republic) B Krejčíková	6	3	4
10	(United States) E Navarro	2	6	6

Fourth round
7	M Andreeva	6	6
10	(United States) E Navarro	2	3

==== Section 6 ====
First round
15	(Czech Republic) K Muchová	5	2
(China) Xin Wang	7	6
(Turkey) Z Sönmez	7^{7}	6
(Romania) J Cristian	6^{3}	3
(Netherlands) S Lamens	6	6
Q	(United States) I Jovic	1	1
Q	(Australia) P Hon	2	5
18	E Alexandrova	6	7
27	(Poland) M Linette	7^{9}	1	4
Q	(France) E Jacquemot	6^{7}	6	6
(United States) A Parks	0	3
(Switzerland) B Bencic	6	6
(United States) K Volynets	3	7^{7}	6
(Germany) T Maria	6	6^{4}	1
(Italy) E Cocciaretto	6	6
3	(United States) J Pegula	2	3

Second round
(China) Xin Wang	5	5
(Turkey) Z Sönmez	7	7
(Netherlands) S Lamens	4	0
18	E Alexandrova	6	6
Q	(France) E Jacquemot	6	1	2
(Switzerland) B Bencic	4	6	6
(United States) K Volynets	0	4
(Italy) E Cocciaretto	6	6

Third round
(Turkey) Z Sönmez	3	6^{1}
18	E Alexandrova	6	7^{7}
(Switzerland) B Bencic	6	3	7^{10}
(Italy) E Cocciaretto	4	6	6^{7}

Fourth round
18	E Alexandrova	6^{4}	4
(Switzerland) B Bencic	7^{7}	6

==== Section 7 ====
First round
8	(Poland) I Świątek	7	6
P Kudermetova	5	1
PR	(United States) C McNally	6	6
WC	(United Kingdom) J Burrage	3	1
(Colombia) C Osorio	3	2
(United States) D Collins	6	6
Q	(Slovenia) V Erjavec	3	6	6
26	(Ukraine) M Kostyuk	6	3	4
23	(Denmark) C Tauson	2	6	6
WC	(United Kingdom) H Watson	6	4	3
A Kalinskaya	6	7^{7}
Q	(Serbia) N Stojanović	3	6^{4}
(Greece) M Sakkari	6	6
A Blinkova	4	4
(Armenia) E Avanesyan	2	1
11	(Kazakhstan) E Rybakina	6	6

Second round
8	(Poland) I Świątek	5	6	6
PR	(United States) C McNally	7	2	1
(United States) D Collins	6	6
Q	(Slovenia) V Erjavec	4	1
23	(Denmark) C Tauson	6	7^{12}
A Kalinskaya	3	6^{10}
(Greece) M Sakkari	3	1
11	(Kazakhstan) E Rybakina	6	6

Third round
8	(Poland) I Świątek	6	6
(United States) D Collins	2	3
23	(Denmark) C Tauson	7^{8}	6
11	(Kazakhstan) E Rybakina	6^{6}	3

Fourth round
8	(Poland) I Świątek	6	6
23	(Denmark) C Tauson	4	1

==== Section 8 ====
First round
16	(Australia) D Kasatkina	7	6
(Colombia) E Arango	5	3
(Romania) I-C Begu	7^{8}	1	6
Q	(Slovenia) K Juvan	6^{6}	6	3
(Ukraine) Y Starodubtseva	1	6	6
WC	(United Kingdom) F Jones	6	3	1
(Australia) M Joint	3	2
19	L Samsonova	6	6
28	(United States) S Kenin	7^{7}	6
Q	(United States) T Townsend	6^{5}	2
(Spain) J Bouzas Maneiro	6	3
Q	(Germany) E Seidel	3	2^{r}
V Azarenka	2	6	1
Q	A Zakharova	6	2	6
(Ukraine) D Yastremska	7^{7}	6
2	(United States) C Gauff	6^{3}	1

Second round
16	(Australia) D Kasatkina	6	4	6
(Romania) I-C Begu	2	6	1
(Ukraine) Y Starodubtseva	2	1
19	L Samsonova	6	6
28	(United States) S Kenin	1	6^{4}
(Spain) J Bouzas Maneiro	6	7^{7}
Q	A Zakharova	7	5	6^{8}
(Ukraine) D Yastremska	5	7	7^{10}

Third round
16	(Australia) D Kasatkina	2	3
19	L Samsonova	6	6
(Spain) J Bouzas Maneiro	6	2	6
(Ukraine) D Yastremska	1	6	3

Fourth round
19	L Samsonova	7	7
(Spain) J Bouzas Maneiro	5	5

== Championship match statistics ==
Category	(Poland) Świątek	(United States) Anisimova
1st serve %	29/37 (78%)	19/42 (45%)
1st serve points won	21 of 29 = 72%	5 of 19 = 26%
2nd serve points won	5 of 8 = 63%	8 of 23 = 35%
Total service points won	26 of 37 = 70.27%	13 of 42 = 30.95%
Aces	3	0
Double faults	2	5
Winners	10	8
Unforced errors	11	28
Net points won	3 of 3 = 100%	0 of 3 = 0%
Break points converted	6 of 9 = 67%	0 of 0 = 0%
Return points won	29 of 42 = 69%	11 of 37 = 30%
Total points won	55	24

== Seeded players ==
The following are the seeded players. Seedings are based on WTA rankings as of 23 June 2025. Rankings and points before are as of 30 June 2025.

^{‡}	Champion
^{†}	Runner-up

Seed	Rank	Player	Points before	Points defending	Points earned	Points after	Status
1	1	Aryna Sabalenka	11,640	0	780	12,420	Semifinals lost to (United States) Amanda Anisimova [13]
2	2	(United States) Coco Gauff	7,899	240	10	7,669	First round lost to (Ukraine) Dayana Yastremska
3	3	(United States) Jessica Pegula	6,483	70	10	6,423	First round lost to (Italy) Elisabetta Cocciaretto
4	5	(Italy) Jasmine Paolini	4,806	1,300	70	3,576	Second round lost to Kamilla Rakhimova
5	6	(China) Zheng Qinwen	4,803	10	10	4,803	First round lost to (Czech Republic) Kateřina Siniaková
6	8	(United States) Madison Keys	4,484	240	130	4,374	Third round lost to (Germany) Laura Siegemund
7	7	Mirra Andreeva	4,743	10	430	5,163	Quarterfinals lost to (Switzerland) Belinda Bencic
8	4	(Poland) Iga Świątek	4,943	130	2,000	6,813	Champion, defeated (United States) Amanda Anisimova [13]
9	9	(Spain) Paula Badosa	3,684	240	10	3,454	First round lost to (United Kingdom) Katie Boulter
10	10	(United States) Emma Navarro	3,610	430	240	3,420	Fourth round lost to Mirra Andreeva [7]
11	11	(Kazakhstan) Elena Rybakina	3,456	780	130	2,806	Third round lost to (Denmark) Clara Tauson [23]
12	15	Diana Shnaider	2,776	130	70	2,716	Second round lost to (France) Diane Parry [Q]
13	12	(United States) Amanda Anisimova	3,200	30	1,300	4,470	Runner-up, lost to (Poland) Iga Świątek [8]
14	13	(Ukraine) Elina Svitolina	3,094	430	130	2,794	Third round lost to (Belgium) Elise Mertens [24]
15	14	(Czech Republic) Karolína Muchová	2,881	10	10	2,881	First round lost to (China) Wang Xinyu
16	18	(Australia) Daria Kasatkina	2,361	130	130	2,361	Third round lost to Liudmila Samsonova [19]
17	16	(Czech Republic) Barbora Krejčíková	2,724	2,000	130	854	Third round lost to (United States) Emma Navarro [10]
18	17	Ekaterina Alexandrova	2,426	0	240	2,666	Fourth round lost to (Switzerland) Belinda Bencic
19	19	Liudmila Samsonova	2,276	130	430	2,576	Quarterfinals lost to (Poland) Iga Świątek [8]
20	21	(Latvia) Jeļena Ostapenko	2,170	430	10	1,750	First round lost to (United Kingdom) Sonay Kartal
21	20	(Brazil) Beatriz Haddad Maia	2,189	130	70	2,129	Second round lost to (Hungary) Dalma Gálfi
22	25	(Croatia) Donna Vekić	1,813	780	70	1,103	Second round lost to (Spain) Cristina Bucșa
23	22	(Denmark) Clara Tauson	2,062	10	240	2,292	Fourth round lost to (Poland) Iga Świątek [8]
24	23	(Belgium) Elise Mertens	1,936	70	240	2,106	Fourth round lost to Aryna Sabalenka [1]
25	24	(Poland) Magdalena Fręch	1,821	10	10	1,821	First round lost to (Canada) Victoria Mboko [LL]
26	26	(Ukraine) Marta Kostyuk	1,736	130	10	1,616	First round lost to (Slovenia) Veronika Erjavec [Q]
27	29	(Poland) Magda Linette	1,594	10	10	1,594	First round lost to (France) Elsa Jacquemot [Q]
28	28	(United States) Sofia Kenin	1,618	10	70	1,678	Second round lost to (Spain) Jéssica Bouzas Maneiro
29	38	(Canada) Leylah Fernandez	1,350	70	70	1,350	Second round lost to (Germany) Laura Siegemund
30	27	(Czech Republic) Linda Nosková	1,697	70	240	1,867	Fourth round lost to (United States) Amanda Anisimova [13]
31	31	(United States) Ashlyn Krueger	1,484	10	70	1,544	Second round lost to Anastasia Pavlyuchenkova
32	30	(United States) McCartney Kessler	1,485	40	10	1,455	First round lost to (Czech Republic) Markéta Vondroušová

== Other entry information ==
=== Wildcards ===
- (United Kingdom) Jodie Burrage
- (United Kingdom) Harriet Dart
- (United Kingdom) Francesca Jones
- (United Kingdom) Hannah Klugman
- (Czech Republic) Petra Kvitová
- (United Kingdom) Mika Stojsavljevic
- (United Kingdom) Heather Watson
- (United Kingdom) Mingge Xu

=== Protected ranking ===
- (Romania) Sorana Cîrstea (37)
- (China) Zhu Lin (50)
- (Latvia) Anastasija Sevastova (65)
- (United States) Caty McNally (71)
- (Belgium) Yanina Wickmayer (91)

=== Qualifiers ===
- (Canada) Carson Branstine
- (Slovenia) Veronika Erjavec
- (Czech Republic) Linda Fruhvirtová
- (Australia) Talia Gibson
- (Australia) Priscilla Hon
- (France) Elsa Jacquemot
- (United States) Iva Jovic
- (Slovenia) Kaja Juvan
- (Croatia) Petra Martić
- (France) Diane Parry
- Aliaksandra Sasnovich
- (Germany) Ella Seidel
- (Serbia) Nina Stojanović
- (United States) Taylor Townsend
- Anastasia Zakharova
- (China) Zhang Shuai

=== Lucky losers ===
- (Canada) Victoria Mboko
- (Argentina) Solana Sierra

=== Withdrawals ===
- ‡ (Ukraine) Anhelina Kalinina (83) → replaced by (Japan) Aoi Ito (100)
- § (Belgium) Greet Minnen (80) → replaced by (Argentina) Solana Sierra (LL)
- § Anastasia Potapova (36) → replaced by (Canada) Victoria Mboko (LL)

‡ – withdrew from entry list
§ – withdrew from main draw

Preceded by 2025 French Open – Women's singles	Grand Slam women's singles	Succeeded by 2025 US Open – Women's singles
