= 2025 Wimbledon Championships – Women's doubles =

Tennis championship

Women's doubles
- 2025 Wimbledon Championships
- Final date: 13 July 2025

Final
- Champions: Veronika Kudermetova (Belgium) Elise Mertens
- Runners-up: (Chinese Taipei) Hsieh Su-wei (Latvia) Jeļena Ostapenko
- Score: 3–6, 6–2, 6–4

Details
- Draw: 64
- Seeds: 16

Events
Singles	men	women		boys	girls
Doubles	men	women	mixed	boys	girls
WC Singles	men	women	quad
WC Doubles	men	women	quad
14&U Singles	boys	girls
Legends	men	women	mixed
- Wimbledon Championships

Veronika Kudermetova and Elise Mertens defeated Hsieh Su-wei and Jeļena Ostapenko in the final, 3–6, 6–2, 6–4 to win the ladies' doubles tennis title at the 2025 Wimbledon Championships. It was Kudermetova's first major title and Mertens' fifth.

Kateřina Siniaková and Taylor Townsend were the defending champions, but lost in the semifinals to Hsieh and Ostapenko.

Siniaková retained the WTA No. 1 doubles ranking after Ostapenko lost in the final. Erin Routliffe and the pair of Sara Errani and Jasmine Paolini were also in contention at the beginning of the tournament.

== Seeds ==
1. (Czech Republic) Kateřina Siniaková / (United States) Taylor Townsend (semifinals)
2. (Canada) Gabriela Dabrowski / (New Zealand) Erin Routliffe (quarterfinals)
3. (Italy) Sara Errani / (Italy) Jasmine Paolini (second round)
4. (Chinese Taipei) Hsieh Su-wei / (Latvia) Jeļena Ostapenko (runners-up)
5. Mirra Andreeva / Diana Shnaider (third round)
6. (United States) Asia Muhammad / (Netherlands) Demi Schuurs (second round)
7. (Ukraine) Lyudmyla Kichenok / (Australia) Ellen Perez (third round)
8. Veronika Kudermetova / (Belgium) Elise Mertens (champions)
9. (Slovakia) Tereza Mihalíková / (United Kingdom) Olivia Nicholls (first round)
10. (Hungary) Tímea Babos / (Brazil) Luisa Stefani (quarterfinals)
11. (Brazil) Beatriz Haddad Maia / (Germany) Laura Siegemund (third round, withdrew)
12. (China) Jiang Xinyu / (Chinese Taipei) Wu Fang-hsien (second round)
13. Irina Khromacheva / (Hungary) Fanny Stollár (third round)
14. Ekaterina Alexandrova / (China) Zhang Shuai (third round)
15. (United States) Nicole Melichar-Martinez / Liudmila Samsonova (third round)
16. (United States) Caroline Dolehide / (United States) Sofia Kenin (quarterfinals)

Click on the seed number of a player to go to their draw section.

== Draw ==
Key

- Q = Qualifier
- WC = Wild card
- LL = Lucky loser
- Alt = Alternate
- ITF = ITF entry
- PR = Protected ranking
- SR = Special ranking
- SE = Special exempt
- JE = Junior exempt
- JR = Junior Accelerator Programme entrant
- CO = College Accelerator Programme entrant
- NG = Next Gen Accelerator Program entrant
- w/o = Walkover
- r = Retired
- d = Defaulted

=== Finals ===
Quarterfinals
1	(Czech Republic) Kateřina Siniaková (United States) Taylor Townsend	7^{7}	6
10	(Hungary) Tímea Babos (Brazil) Luisa Stefani	6^{2}	3
4	(Chinese Taipei) Hsieh Su-wei (Latvia) Jeļena Ostapenko	6^{4}	6	6
(Romania) Sorana Cîrstea; Anna Kalinskaya	7^{7}	3	2
(Australia) Olivia Gadecki (United States) Desirae Krawczyk	6	6
16	(United States) Caroline Dolehide (United States) Sofia Kenin	2	3
8	Veronika Kudermetova (Belgium) Elise Mertens	7	7^{7}
2	(Canada) Gabriela Dabrowski (New Zealand) Erin Routliffe	5	6^{4}

Semifinals
1	(Czech Republic) Kateřina Siniaková (United States) Taylor Townsend	5	4
4	(Chinese Taipei) Hsieh Su-wei (Latvia) Jeļena Ostapenko	7	6
(Australia) Olivia Gadecki (United States) Desirae Krawczyk	6	0	3
8	Veronika Kudermetova (Belgium) Elise Mertens	3	6	6

Final
4	(Chinese Taipei) Hsieh Su-wei (Latvia) Jeļena Ostapenko	6	2	4
8	Veronika Kudermetova (Belgium) Elise Mertens	3	6	6

=== Top half ===
==== Section 1 ====
First round
1	(Czech Republic) K Siniaková (United States) T Townsend	6	6
(Hungary) A Bondár (Japan) M Uchijima	4	1
(United States) M Kessler (Denmark) C Tauson	3	7^{7}	6
(United Kingdom) H Dart (United Kingdom) M Lumsden	6	6^{0}	4
(Colombia) C Osorio (United States) A Parks	1	6	6
WC	(United Kingdom) A Barnett (United Kingdom) E Silva	6	3	3
A Blinkova (China) Y Yuan	3	4
15	(United States) N Melichar-Martinez; L Samsonova	6	6
10	(Hungary) T Babos (Brazil) L Stefani	6	6
(Romania) J Cristian (Belgium) M Kempen	3	1
(China) H Guo; A Panova	6	5	6
(Mexico) G Olmos (Mexico) R Zarazúa	3	7	2
(Japan) S Aoyama (Japan) E Shibahara	4	4
(Poland) M Linette (United States) B Pera	6	6
(China) Y Xu (China) Z Yang	5	3
7	(Ukraine) L Kichenok (Australia) E Perez	7	6

Second round
1	(Czech Republic) K Siniaková (United States) T Townsend	6	6
(United States) M Kessler (Denmark) C Tauson	3	0
(Colombia) C Osorio (United States) A Parks	6^{5}	4
15	(United States) N Melichar-Martinez; L Samsonova	7^{7}	6
10	(Hungary) T Babos (Brazil) L Stefani	7^{7}	6^{3}	6
(China) H Guo; A Panova	6^{3}	7^{7}	3
(Poland) M Linette (United States) B Pera	4	1
7	(Ukraine) L Kichenok (Australia) E Perez	6	6

Third round
1	(Czech Republic) K Siniaková (United States) T Townsend	6^{5}	6	6
15	(United States) N Melichar-Martinez; L Samsonova	7^{7}	1	4
10	(Hungary) T Babos (Brazil) L Stefani	7	6
7	(Ukraine) L Kichenok (Australia) E Perez	5	4

Quarterfinals
1	(Czech Republic) K Siniaková (United States) T Townsend	7^{7}	6
10	(Hungary) T Babos (Brazil) L Stefani	6^{2}	3

==== Section 2 ====
First round
4	(Chinese Taipei) S-w Hsieh (Latvia) J Ostapenko	6	6
(Georgia (country)) O Kalashnikova; E Pridankina	2	3
(Ukraine) M Kostyuk (Romania) E-G Ruse	6	6
PR	(Latvia) A Sevastova (Belgium) Y Wickmayer	4	4
(Australia) A Tomljanović (Bulgaria) V Tomova	6^{6}	2
(Japan) E Hozumi (Indonesia) A Sutjiadi	7^{8}	6
(Ukraine) N Kichenok (Ukraine) Y Starodubtseva	5	2
14	E Alexandrova (China) S Zhang	7	6
9	(Slovakia) T Mihalíková (United Kingdom) O Nicholls	4	1
K Rakhimova (Czech Republic) A Sisková	6	6
(Italy) A Moratelli (United States) S Santamaria	2	3
(Romania) S Cîrstea; A Kalinskaya	6	6
Alt	(United States) Q Gleason (Brazil) I Martins	6	6
(Philippines) A Eala (Germany) E Lys	4	2
WC	(United Kingdom) E Appleton (United Kingdom) H Watson	3	4
5	M Andreeva; D Shnaider	6	6

Second round
4	(Chinese Taipei) S-w Hsieh (Latvia) J Ostapenko	5	6	6
(Ukraine) M Kostyuk (Romania) E-G Ruse	7	2	2
(Japan) E Hozumi (Indonesia) A Sutjiadi	6^{3}	7	2
14	E Alexandrova (China) S Zhang	7^{7}	5	6
K Rakhimova (Czech Republic) A Sisková	6^{7}	6	2
(Romania) S Cîrstea; A Kalinskaya	7^{9}	4	6
Alt	(United States) Q Gleason (Brazil) I Martins	5	3
5	M Andreeva; D Shnaider	7	6

Third round
4	(Chinese Taipei) S-w Hsieh (Latvia) J Ostapenko	6	6
14	E Alexandrova (China) S Zhang	4	0
(Romania) S Cîrstea; A Kalinskaya	4	7^{7}	6
5	M Andreeva; D Shnaider	6	6^{3}	1

Quarterfinals
4	(Chinese Taipei) S-w Hsieh (Latvia) J Ostapenko	6^{4}	6	6
(Romania) S Cîrstea; A Kalinskaya	7^{7}	3	2

=== Bottom half ===
==== Section 3 ====
First round
6	(United States) A Muhammad (Netherlands) D Schuurs	6	6
(Canada) L Fernandez (New Zealand) L Sun	2	1
(Australia) K Birrell (Australia) M Joint	6	5	6
(Norway) U Eikeri (Japan) M Ninomiya	3	7	2
(Italy) L Bronzetti (United States) A Li	3	2
(Australia) O Gadecki (United States) D Krawczyk	6	6
PR	(China) Q Tang (China) L Zhu	4	4
12	(China) X Jiang (Chinese Taipei) F-h Wu	6	6
16	(United States) C Dolehide (United States) S Kenin	7	6
PR	(Netherlands) B Schoofs (Ukraine) D Yastremska	5	0
WC	(United Kingdom) E McDonald (United Kingdom) M Xu	6	6^{1}	6
(Czech Republic) L Nosková (Slovakia) R Šramková	4	7^{7}	3
(Kazakhstan) Y Putintseva (United States) P Stearns	6^{5}	2
(Chinese Taipei) H-c Chan (Czech Republic) B Krejčíková	7^{7}	6
(Spain) C Bucșa (Japan) M Kato	3	3
3	(Italy) S Errani (Italy) J Paolini	6	6

Second round
6	(United States) A Muhammad (Netherlands) D Schuurs	6	4	6^{7}
(Australia) K Birrell (Australia) M Joint	4	6	7^{10}
(Australia) O Gadecki (United States) D Krawczyk	6	6
12	(China) X Jiang (Chinese Taipei) F-h Wu	2	1
16	(United States) C Dolehide (United States) S Kenin	6	6
WC	(United Kingdom) E McDonald (United Kingdom) M Xu	2	3
(Chinese Taipei) H-c Chan (Czech Republic) B Krejčíková	6	6
3	(Italy) S Errani (Italy) J Paolini	3	2

Third round
(Australia) K Birrell (Australia) M Joint	3	4
(Australia) O Gadecki (United States) D Krawczyk	6	6
16	(United States) C Dolehide (United States) S Kenin	w/o
(Chinese Taipei) H-c Chan (Czech Republic) B Krejčíková

Quarterfinals
(Australia) O Gadecki (United States) D Krawczyk	6	6
16	(United States) C Dolehide (United States) S Kenin	2	3

==== Section 4 ====
First round
8	V Kudermetova (Belgium) E Mertens	6	6
WC	(United Kingdom) H Klugman (United Kingdom) M Stojsavljevic	2	2
(Czech Republic) M Bouzková (Kazakhstan) A Danilina	6	6
(Poland) K Piter (Egypt) M Sherif	3	3
WC	(United Kingdom) J Burrage (United Kingdom) S Kartal	4	6	7
(Spain) J Bouzas Maneiro (Spain) Y Cavallé Reimers	6	1	5
PR	(United States) H Baptiste (United States) C McNally	1	6	3
11	(Brazil) B Haddad Maia (Germany) L Siegemund	6	2	6
13	I Khromacheva (Hungary) F Stollár	6	7^{7}
(Serbia) A Krunić (Netherlands) S Lamens	3	6^{2}
Alt	(Czech Republic) A Dețiuc; I Shymanovich	6	6
Alt	(Netherlands) I Haverlag (Netherlands) A Rus	2	2
PR	(Czech Republic) M Škoch (Czech Republic) M Vondroušová	5	6	5
P Kudermetova (Turkey) Z Sönmez	7	2	7
(China) Xin Wang (China) S Zheng	1	4
2	(Canada) G Dabrowski (New Zealand) E Routliffe	6	6

Second round
8	V Kudermetova (Belgium) E Mertens	6	6
(Czech Republic) M Bouzková (Kazakhstan) A Danilina	2	4
WC	(United Kingdom) J Burrage (United Kingdom) S Kartal	3	1
11	(Brazil) B Haddad Maia (Germany) L Siegemund	6	6
13	I Khromacheva (Hungary) F Stollár	7^{7}	6
Alt	(Czech Republic) A Dețiuc; I Shymanovich	6^{2}	4
P Kudermetova (Turkey) Z Sönmez	3	3
2	(Canada) G Dabrowski (New Zealand) E Routliffe	6	6

Third round
8	V Kudermetova (Belgium) E Mertens	w/o
11	(Brazil) B Haddad Maia (Germany) L Siegemund
13	I Khromacheva (Hungary) F Stollár	6^{1}	6^{2}
2	(Canada) G Dabrowski (New Zealand) E Routliffe	7^{7}	7^{7}

Quarterfinals
8	V Kudermetova (Belgium) E Mertens	7	7^{7}
2	(Canada) G Dabrowski (New Zealand) E Routliffe	5	6^{4}

== Seeded teams ==
The following are the seeded teams. Seedings are based on WTA rankings as of 23 June 2025.

Country	Player	Country	Player	Rank	Seed
CZE	Kateřina Siniaková	USA	Taylor Townsend	3	1
CAN	Gabriela Dabrowski	NZL	Erin Routliffe	10	2
ITA	Sara Errani	ITA	Jasmine Paolini	10	3
TPE	Hsieh Su-wei	LAT	Jeļena Ostapenko	19	4
	Mirra Andreeva		Diana Shnaider	22	5
USA	Asia Muhammad	NED	Demi Schuurs	28	6
UKR	Lyudmyla Kichenok	AUS	Ellen Perez	28	7
	Veronika Kudermetova	BEL	Elise Mertens	32	8
SVK	Tereza Mihalíková	GBR	Olivia Nicholls	49	9
HUN	Tímea Babos	BRA	Luisa Stefani	56	10
BRA	Beatriz Haddad Maia	GER	Laura Siegemund	56	11
CHN	Jiang Xinyu	TPE	Wu Fang-hsien	57	12
	Irina Khromacheva	HUN	Fanny Stollár	61	13
	Ekaterina Alexandrova	CHN	Zhang Shuai	64	14
USA	Nicole Melichar-Martinez		Liudmila Samsonova	64	15
USA	Caroline Dolehide	USA	Sofia Kenin	67	16

== Other entry information ==
=== Wildcards ===
- (United Kingdom) Emily Appleton / (United Kingdom) Heather Watson
- (United Kingdom) Alicia Barnett / (United Kingdom) Eden Silva
- (United Kingdom) Jodie Burrage / (United Kingdom) Sonay Kartal
- (United Kingdom) Hannah Klugman / (United Kingdom) Mika Stojsavljevic
- (United Kingdom) Ella McDonald / (United Kingdom) Mimi Xu

=== Protected ranking ===
- (United States) Hailey Baptiste / (United States) Caty McNally
- (Netherlands) Bibiane Schoofs / (Ukraine) Dayana Yastremska
- (Latvia) Anastasija Sevastova / (Belgium) Yanina Wickmayer
- (Czech Republic) Miriam Škoch / (Czech Republic) Markéta Vondroušová
- (China) Tang Qianhui / (China) Zhu Lin

=== Alternates ===
- (United States) Quinn Gleason / (Brazil) Ingrid Martins
- (Czech Republic) Anastasia Dețiuc / Iryna Shymanovich
- (Netherlands) Isabelle Haverlag / (Netherlands) Arantxa Rus

=== Withdrawals ===
- Victoria Azarenka / (United States) Ashlyn Krueger → replaced by (Czech Republic) Anastasia Dețiuc / Iryna Shymanovich
- (Serbia) Olga Danilović / Anastasia Potapova → replaced by (United States) Quinn Gleason / (Brazil) Ingrid Martins
- (Belgium) Greet Minnen / (Romania) Monica Niculescu → replaced by (Netherlands) Isabelle Haverlag / (Netherlands) Arantxa Rus
