= Sonay Kartal =

British tennis player (born 2001)

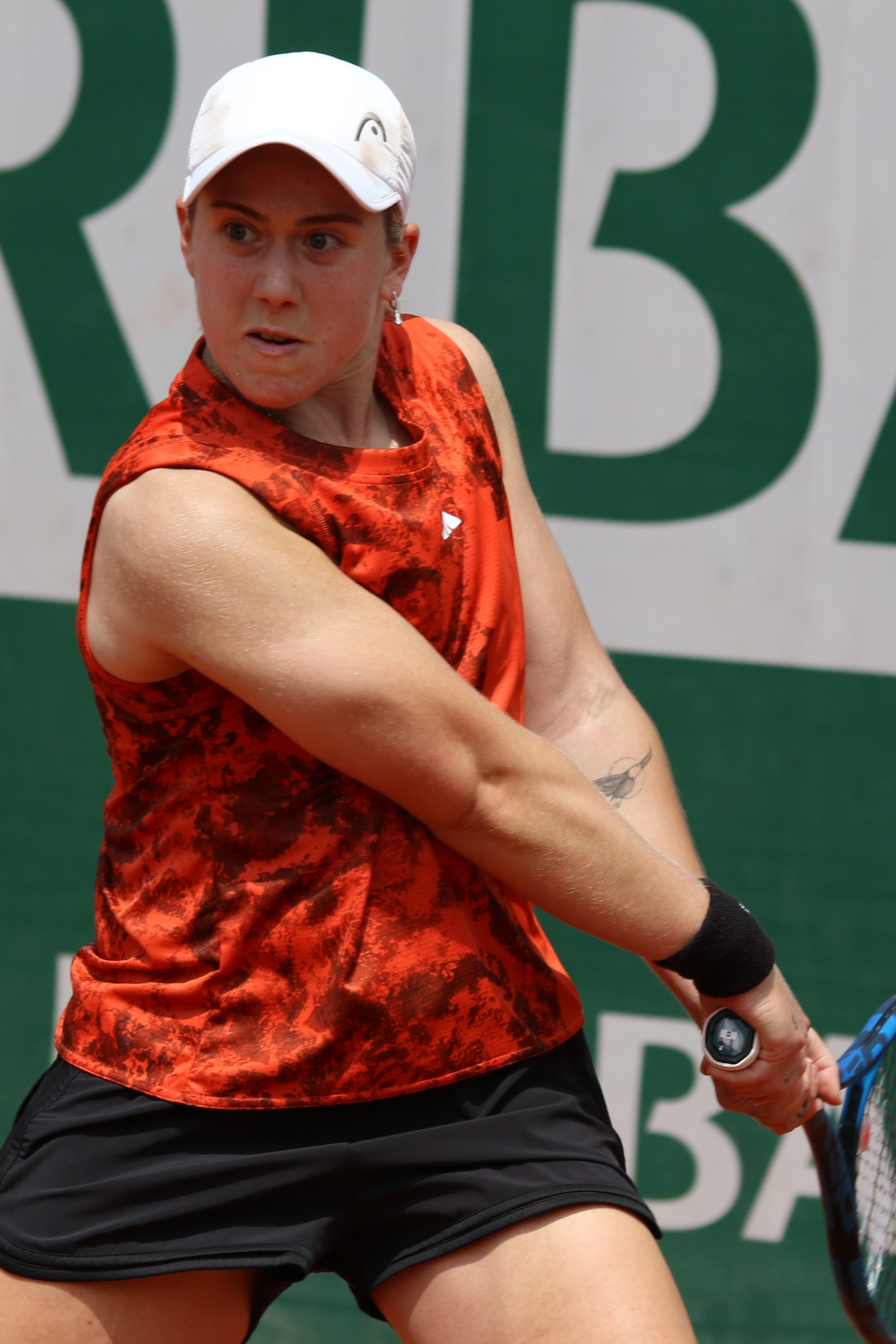
- Kartal at the 2023 French Open
- Country (sports): Great Britain
- Residence: Brighton, England
- Born: 28 October 2001 (age 25) London, England
- Height: 1.63 m (5 ft 4 in)
- Turned pro: 2019
- Plays: Right (two-handed backhand)
- Coach: Julie Hobbs, Ben & Martin Reeves
- Prize money: $2,427,962

Singles
- Career record: 185–73
- Career titles: 1
- Highest ranking: No. 44 (14 July 2025)
- Current ranking: No. 52 (26 October 2026)

Grand Slam singles results
- Australian Open: 1R (2025, 2026)
- French Open: 2R (2025)
- Wimbledon: 4R (2025)
- US Open: 1R (2025)

Doubles
- Career record: 12–15
- Career titles: 0
- Highest ranking: No. 171 (5 January 2026)
- Current ranking: No. 1,613 (2 November 2026)

Grand Slam doubles results
- Australian Open: 1R (2026)
- French Open: 2R (2025)
- Wimbledon: 2R (2025)
- US Open: 2R (2025)
- Last updated on: 2 November 2026.

Sonay Kartal (born 28 October 2001) is a British professional tennis player. She has career-high rankings of world No. 44 in singles, achieved on 14 July 2025, and No. 171 in doubles, achieved on 5 January 2026. Kartal has won one WTA Tour title and 14 ITF titles, all in singles. She is the current British No. 2 women's singles player.

== Personal life ==
Kartal was born in Sidcup, London, and lives in the city of Brighton and Hove. She is of Turkish descent through her father. She attended Saltdean Primary School and Longhill High School.

She began playing tennis at the age of six after watching her older brother play. She currently trains at Pavilion & Avenue tennis club in Hove. Her favourite tennis players are Roger Federer and Kim Clijsters.

== Career ==
=== 2021–22: WTA Tour and major debuts ===
Kartal won her first ITF title in November 2021, at the Antalya 15k event, beating Amarissa Toth in the final. This was shortly followed by her second title (and her first on hardcourt) at Monastir $15k, defeating former world No. 40, Ayumi Morita, in the final.

Kartal won the women's title at the 2021 UK Pro League with a straight sets win over Freya Christie in the final. She ended 2021 ranked 993.

She followed up her success in late 2021 early in the 2022 season, winning her third title at the 25k Birmingham event with a three-sets win over compatriot Talia Neilson Gatenby. She won a second consecutive 25k title in Glasgow, beating Barbora Palicová.

Kartal was part of the BJK Cup team for the qualifying tie in April 2022 when Great Britain faced the Czech team in Prague. However, she was not selected to play any matches.

In May 2022, she won two consecutive singles titles in the third and fourth weeks of the 25k Nottingham events, beating Danielle Lao and Joanna Garland in the finals.

During the grass-court season, Kartal defeated Lily Miyazaki in the first round at the 2022 Surbiton Trophy, before falling in the second round to top seed Madison Brengle. She made her WTA Tour debut as a wildcard entrant at the 2022 Nottingham Open, where she lost in the first round to Camila Giorgi. At the 2022 Ilkley Trophy, she reached her first semifinal at 100k level, losing in two tiebreakers to compatriot Jodie Burrage.

Kartal was awarded wildcard entry into the main-draw at the Wimbledon Championships, where she made her major debut, losing in the first round to lucky loser Lesley Pattinama Kerkhove in three sets.

In October, she posted a quarterfinal result at the W60 indoor event in Trnava, losing to the second seed Vitalia Diatchenko. The following week at the W60 Trvana 2, she upset third seed Daria Snigur in the first round, but was forced to retire from her second-round match due to injury. However, these performances allowed Kartal to make her top-200 debut and she ended the year ranked as world No. 198, almost 800 places above her 2021 year-end ranking.

=== 2023–24: Wimbledon third round, WTA Tour title, top 100 ===
At the 2023 Australian Open, Kartal lost in three sets to 21st seed Elizabeth Mandlik in the first qualifying round. As a wildcard player, Kartal entered the W60 event in Sunderland, England, falling to former top-30 player Mona Barthel in the quarterfinals.

In June 2024, ranked No. 295, she qualified for the first time at the Wimbledon Championships, earning a spot in the main draw, having received wildcards in the previous two editions. She defeated 29th seed Sorana Cirstea and world No. 45, Clara Burel. She became the second British woman in the Open Era to reach the third round at this Major as a qualifier, and first since Karen Cross in 1997. She lost her third round match to second seed Coco Gauff, going down in straight sets.

In August 2024, Kartal lifted back-to-back W35 GB Pro Series trophies on hardcourts in Roehampton, England, her fourth and fifth titles at that level in the season.

The following month, ranked No. 151, having made it through qualifying, she reached the first WTA Tour quarterfinal in her career at the 2024 Jasmin Open in Monastir, upsetting fifth seed Jaqueline Cristian, her third top 100 win of 2024, and Mai Hontama. Next, she defeated Yuliia Starodubtseva in straight sets, and then Eva Lys in the semifinals by retirement, to reach her maiden WTA Tour final. In the final, Kartal defeated Rebecca Šramková in straight sets. As a result, she broke into the top 100, rising 55 positions up to a new career-high of world No. 96 in the WTA singles rankings for the first time in her career.

Kartal won her sixth ITF title of the year at the W100 in Shrewsbury in October 2024, defeating fellow Briton Heather Watson in the final.

=== 2025: Major fourth round, WTA 1000 quarterfinal, top 50 ===
Kartal made her Australian Open main-draw debut, after securing direct entry thanks to her WTA ranking, but lost in the first round to Jéssica Bouzas Maneiro. In February, after qualifying at the Abu Dhabi Open, she lost in the first round to fellow qualifier Katie Volynets, in three sets. In March, she entered the main draw at Indian Wells as a lucky loser, making her WTA 1000 debut, and defeated qualifier Varvara Lepchenko, before overcoming 16th seed Beatriz Haddad Maia to register her maiden win against a top-20 ranked player and to reach the third round of a WTA 1000 tournament for the first time. Next, she defeated Polina Kudermetova in straight sets, before losing to world No. 1, Aryna Sabalenka, in the fourth round. Despite the defeat, Kartal moved up 20 places in the WTA rankings to a new career-high of 63 on 17 March 2025.

Kartal made her debut for the Great Britain Billie Jean King Cup team against Germany in the 2025 qualifying round held in The Hague, recording a win over Jule Niemeier in the opening singles match. She then defeated Eva Vedder as Great Britain beat the Netherlands to secure a place at the finals.

At the Madrid Open, Kartal overcame Jaqueline Cristian in the first round, before losing her next match to 17th seed Elina Svitolina. Also in her debut appearance at the Italian Open, she defeated Kimberly Birrell, but lost to 30th seed Linda Nosková in the second round. At the French Open where she also made her debut, Kartal defeated Erika Andreeva in the first round. She lost her next match to Marie Bouzková. Following Roland Garros, Kartal made her top 50 debut on 9 June 2025.

Moving onto the grass-court season as a wildcard entrant at the Queen's Club Championships in London, Kartal defeated world No. 16, Daria Kasatkina, in the first round, before losing to eighth seed Amanda Anisimova. The following week at the Nottingham Open, she overcame qualifier Léolia Jeanjean to set up a second round match against two-time defending champion, Katie Boulter, which she lost in three sets.

At Wimbledon, Kartal defeated 20th seed Jeļena Ostapenko, Viktoriya Tomova and qualifier Diane Parry to reach the fourth round at a major for the first time, at which point she lost to Anastasia Pavlyuchenkova. Despite her loss, she reached a new career-high ranking of world No. 44, on 14 July 2025.

Making her main-draw debut at the US Open, Kartal lost in the first round to 18th seed Haddad Maia in three sets. At the BJK Cup finals, Kartal defeated Ena Shibahara in straight sets as Great Britain overcame Japan 2–0 to reach the semifinals. In the last four, she lost to Emma Navarro in three sets as the team were eliminated 2–0 by the USA. At the China Open, Kartal defeated Alycia Parks, 14th seed Daria Kasatkina and Maya Joint to make it into the fourth round. She then overcame world No. 5, Mirra Andreeva, in three sets for her first win against a top-10 ranked player and to advance to her maiden WTA 1000 quarterfinal. Her run was ended in the last eight by 26th seed Linda Nosková.

Kartal was named 2025 Lawn Tennis Association female player of the year.

=== 2026: Back injury and return, first WTA 1000 final, British No. 1 ===
Kartal started her 2026 season at the Auckland Open in New Zealand, where she defeated sixth seed Janice Tjen and Ella Seidel, before her run was ended in the quarterfinals by top seed and eventual champion, Elina Svitolina, in a match which went to a deciding set tiebreak. At the Australian Open, she lost in the first round to 31st seed Anna Kalinskaya.

In February, Kartal qualified for the main draw at the Abu Dhabi Open and recorded wins over Cristina Bucșa and lucky loser Renata Zarazua to make it through to the quarterfinals at which point she lost to fellow qualifier Sára Bejlek. The following week, she qualified for the main draw of the Qatar Ladies Open but lost to Magda Linette in the first round.

The following month at the WTA 1000 tournament in Indian Wells, Kartal defeated Lanlana Tararudee, 20th seed Emma Navarro and 15th seed Madison Keys to reach the fourth round for the second successive year. She retired due to a lower back injury, after losing the first set of her fourth round match against third seed Elena Rybakina. Kartal subsequently withdrew from the Miami Open having failed to recover from the injury. She also dropped out of the Great Britain squad for their BJK Cup qualifier against Australia and missed the French Open and Wimbledon. Kartal went on to miss the entire North American hard court swing of the season including the US Open, before declaring herself fit to be part of Great Britain's squad for the BJK Cup finals in Shenzhen, China, at the end of September. She lost to Marie Bouzková as Great Britain were eliminated by the Czech Republic in the quarterfinals.

Making her return to the WTA Tour at the China Open, Kartal defeated qualifier Andrea Lázaro García and 31st seed Wang Xinyu to reach the third round, where she lost to Alina Charaeva. The following week at the Wuhan Open, she recorded wins over Anhelina Kalinina, ninth seed Belinda Bencic, 15th seed Jasmine Paolini, fifth seed Elina Svitolina and Jeļena Ostapenko to make it into her first WTA 1000 final, which she lost to 16th seed Maja Chwalińska in three sets. Despite her defeat, Kartal climbed 121 places in the WTA rankings to world No. 49 and also became British women's singles No. 1 for the first time on 19 October 2026. She withdrew from the Japan Open due to a right knee injury and also pulled out of the Hong Kong Open, effectively ending her season.

== Performance timelines ==
Key
W	F	SF	QF	#R	RR	Q#	P#	DNQ	A	Z#	PO	G	S	B	NMS	NTI	P	NH

(W) winner; (F) finalist; (SF) semifinalist; (QF) quarterfinalist; (#R) rounds 4, 3, 2, 1; (RR) round-robin stage; (Q#) qualification round; (P#) preliminary round; (DNQ) did not qualify; (A) absent; (Z#) Davis/Fed Cup Zonal Group (with number indication) or (PO) play-off; (G) gold, (S) silver or (B) bronze Olympic/Paralympic medal; (NMS) not a Masters tournament; (NTI) not a Tier I tournament; (P) postponed; (NH) not held; (SR) strike rate (events won / competed); (W–L) win–loss record.
To avoid confusion and double counting, these charts are updated at the conclusion of a tournament or when the player's participation has ended.

=== Singles ===
Current through the 2026 Wuhan Open.

Tournament	2022	2023	2024	2025	2026	SR	W–L
Grand Slam tournaments
Australian Open	A	Q1	A	1R	1R	0 / 2	0–2
French Open	A	Q1	A	2R	A	0 / 1	1–1
Wimbledon	1R	1R	3R	4R	A	0 / 4	5–4
US Open	Q1	A	Q3	1R	A	0 / 1	0–1
Win–Loss	0–1	0–1	2–1	4–4	0–1	0 / 8	6–8
WTA 1000 tournaments
Qatar Open	A	NTI	A	Q2	1R	0 / 1	0–1
Dubai Championships	NTI	A	A	A	Q2	0 / 0	0–0
Indian Wells Open	A	A	A	4R	4R	0 / 2	6–2
Miami Open	A	A	A	Q2	A	0 / 0	0–0
Madrid Open	A	A	A	2R	A	0 / 1	1–1
Italian Open	A	A	A	2R	A	0 / 1	1–1
Canadian Open	A	A	A	A	A	0 / 0	0–0
Cincinnati Open	A	A	A	1R	A	0 / 1	0–1
China Open	NH	A	A	QF	3R	0 / 2	6–2
Wuhan Open	Not Held		A	A	F	0 / 1	5–1
Win–Loss	0–0	0–0	0–0	9–5	10–4	0 / 9	19–9

== WTA 1000 tournaments finals ==
=== Singles: 1 (runner-up) ===
Result	Year	Tournament	Surface	Opponent	Score
Loss	2026	Wuhan Open	Hard	(Poland) Maja Chwalińska	6–2, 4–6, 2–6

== WTA Tour finals ==
=== Singles: 2 (1 title, 1 runner-up) ===
Legend WTA 1000 (0–1) WTA 250 (1–0)	Finals by surface Hard (1–1)	Finals by setting Outdoor (1–1)

Result	W–L	Date	Tournament	Tier	Surface	Opponent	Score
Win	1–0	Sep 2024	Jasmin Open, Tunisia	WTA 250	Hard	(Slovakia) Rebecca Šramková	6–3, 7–5
Loss	1–1	Oct 2026	Wuhan Open, China	WTA 1000	Hard	(Poland) Maja Chwalińska	6–2, 4–6, 2–6

== ITF Circuit finals ==
=== Singles: 16 (14 titles, 2 runners-up) ===
Legend W100 tournaments (1–0) W60/75 tournaments (0–1) W25/35 tournaments (11–0) W15 tournaments (2–1)	Finals by surface Hard (12–1) Clay (2–1)

Result	W–L	Date	Tournament	Tier	Surface	Opponent	Score
Loss	0–1	Oct 2021	ITF Antalya, Turkey	W15	Clay	(Spain) Rosa Vicens Mas	1–6, 6–2, 3–6
Win	1–1	Oct 2021	ITF Antalya, Turkey	W15	Clay	(Hungary) Amarissa Tóth	7–5, 7–5
Win	2–1	Nov 2021	ITF Monastir, Tunisia	W15	Hard	(Japan) Ayumi Morita	6–1, 6–2
Win	3–1	Feb 2022	ITF Birmingham, United Kingdom	W25	Hard (i)	(United Kingdom) Talia Neilson Gatenby	5–7, 6–3, 6–2
Win	4–1	Feb 2022	GB Pro-Series Glasgow, UK	W25	Hard (i)	(Czech Republic) Barbora Palicová	7–6^{(5)}, 7–5
Win	5–1	May 2022	ITF Nottingham, UK	W25	Hard	(United States) Danielle Lao	6–1, 6–0
Win	6–1	May 2022	ITF Nottingham, UK	W25	Hard	(Chinese Taipei) Joanna Garland	6–3, 6–1
Win	7–1	Apr 2023	ITF Santa Margherita di Pula, Italy	W25	Clay	(Russia) Ekaterina Makarova	3–6, 6–2, 6–1
Win	8–1	Sept 2023	ITF Leiria, Portugal	W25	Hard	(Russia) Anastasia Zakharova	7–6^{(5)}, 1–6, 6–3
Win	9–1	Jan 2024	GB Pro-Series Loughborough, UK	W35	Hard (i)	(France) Manon Léonard	6–4, 6–1
Win	10–1	Apr 2024	ITF Nottingham, UK	W35	Hard	(Lithuania) Klaudija Bubelytė	6–1, 6–4
Win	11–1	May 2024	ITF Monzón, Spain	W35	Hard	(Czech Republic) Linda Klimovičová	6–1, 6–0
Win	12–1	Jul 2024	ITF Roehampton, UK	W35	Hard	(Germany) Nastasja Schunk	7–5, 6–1
Win	13–1	Aug 2024	ITF Roehampton, UK	W35	Hard	(Japan) Haruka Kaji	6–3, 6–1
Win	14–1	Oct 2024	GB Pro-Series Shrewsbury, UK	W100	Hard (i)	(United Kingdom) Heather Watson	7–5, 4–1 ret.
Loss	14–2	Oct 2024	Hamburg Ladies Cup, Germany	W75	Hard (i)	(Germany) Mona Barthel	4–6, 6–7^{(6)}

== Wins against top 10 players ==
- Kartal has a 2–3 record against players who were, at the time the match was played, ranked in the top 10.

No.	Player	Rk	Event	Surface	Rd	Score	Rk	Year	Ref
1	Mirra Andreeva	5	China Open, China	Hard	4R	7–5, 2–6, 7–5	81	2025	
2	(Ukraine) Elina Svitolina	6	Wuhan Open, China	Hard	QF	6–2, 2–6, 6–4	170	2026	

- Key: (Rk) first use, opponent rank; (Rd) round; (Rk) 2nd use, player rank; (Ref) reference; (F) final; (SF) semifinal; (QF) quarterfinal; (#R) rounds 4, 3, 2, 1; (RR) round-robin stage; (Q#) qualifying rounds or stages (3), 2, 1.
