= GB Pro-Series Shrewsbury =

- 2024 GB Pro-Series Shrewsbury

Women's World Tennis Tour
- Event name: Aegon GB Pro-Series Shrewsbury (former)
- Location: Shrewsbury, United Kingdom
- Venue: The Shrewsbury Club
- Category: ITF Women's World Tennis Tour
- Surface: Hard (indoor)
- Draw: 32S/32Q/16D
- Prize money: $100,000
- Website: Official website

The GB Pro-Series Shrewsbury is a tournament for professional tennis players on the ITF Women's World Tennis Tour, held in Shrewsbury, England, at the Shrewsbury Health and Fitness Club. The event is classified as a $100,000 tournament and played on indoor hardcourts.

The Shrewsbury tournament has been held since 2008, when it was initially ranked as a $75,000 event on the ITF Women's Circuit. From 2013 to 2018, it was downgraded to the introductory $25,000 level, before increasing to a $60,000 tournament for 2019. After a two years absence during the COVID-19 pandemic, it returned in 2022 at the $100,000 level.

== Past finals ==
=== Singles ===
Year	Champion	Runner-up	Score
2024	(United Kingdom) Sonay Kartal	(United Kingdom) Heather Watson	7–5, 4–1 ret.
2023	(Switzerland) Viktorija Golubic	(United Kingdom) Amarni Banks	6–0, 6–0
2022	(Czech Republic) Markéta Vondroušová	(Germany) Eva Lys	7–5, 6–2
2020–21	Tournament cancelled due to the COVID-19 pandemic		
2019	(Russia) Vitalia Diatchenko	(Belgium) Yanina Wickmayer	5–7, 6–1, 6–4
2018	(United Kingdom) Maia Lumsden	(Russia) Valeria Savinykh	6–1, 4–6, 6–3
2017	(Germany) Anna-Lena Friedsam	(Netherlands) Lesley Kerkhove	6–4, 6–2
2016	(Czech Republic) Petra Krejsová	(Switzerland) Tess Sugnaux	6–1, 7–5
2015	(France) Océane Dodin	(United Kingdom) Freya Christie	7–6^{(7–3)}, 7–5
2014	(France) Océane Dodin	(Germany) Carina Witthöft	6–4, 6–3
2013	(Belgium) Alison Van Uytvanck	(Russia) Marta Sirotkina	7–5, 6–1
2012	(Germany) Annika Beck	(Switzerland) Stefanie Vögele	6–2, 6–4
2011	(Germany) Mona Barthel	(United Kingdom) Heather Watson	6–0, 6–3
2010	(Czech Republic) Eva Birnerová	(Luxembourg) Anne Kremer	7–6^{(7–1)}, 3–6, 6–0
2009	(United Kingdom) Elena Baltacha	(United Kingdom) Katie O'Brien	6–3, 4–6, 6–3
2008	(Italy) Roberta Vinci	(Estonia) Maret Ani	7–5, 7–5

=== Doubles ===
Year	Champions	Runners-up	Score
2024	(United Kingdom) Amelia Rajecki (United Kingdom) Mingge Xu	(United Kingdom) Hannah Klugman (United Kingdom) Ranah Stoiber	6–4, 6–1
2023	(United Kingdom) Harriet Dart (Australia) Olivia Gadecki	(Estonia) Elena Malõgina (Czech Republic) Barbora Palicová	6–0, 6–2
2022	(Czech Republic) Miriam Kolodziejová (Czech Republic) Markéta Vondroušová	(France) Jessika Ponchet (Czech Republic) Renata Voráčová	7–6^{(7–4)}, 6–2
2020–21	Tournament cancelled due to the COVID-19 pandemic		
2019	(Australia) Arina Rodionova (Belgium) Yanina Wickmayer	(United Kingdom) Freya Christie (Russia) Valeria Savinykh	6–2, 7–5
2018	(United Kingdom) Sarah Beth Grey (United Kingdom) Olivia Nicholls	(Germany) Tayisiya Morderger (Germany) Yana Morderger	0–6, 6–3, [10–4]
2017	(United Kingdom) Freya Christie (United Kingdom) Harriet Dart	(United Kingdom) Maia Lumsden (United Kingdom) Katie Swan	3–6, 6–4, [10–6]
2016	(United Kingdom) Sarah Beth Grey (United Kingdom) Olivia Nicholls	(United Kingdom) Alicia Barnett (United Kingdom) Lauren McMinn	6–3, 6–3
2015	(Switzerland) Xenia Knoll (Italy) Alice Matteucci	(Netherlands) Lesley Kerkhove (Netherlands) Quirine Lemoine	3–6, 6–3, [10–3]
2014	(Netherlands) Richèl Hogenkamp (Netherlands) Lesley Kerkhove	(Germany) Nicola Geuer (Switzerland) Viktorija Golubic	2–6, 7–5, [10–8]
2013	(Turkey) Çağla Büyükakçay (Turkey) Pemra Özgen	(United Kingdom) Samantha Murray (United Kingdom) Jade Windley	4–6, 6–4, [10–8]
2012	(Serbia) Vesna Dolonc (Switzerland) Stefanie Vögele	(Czech Republic) Karolína Plíšková (Czech Republic) Kristýna Plíšková	6–1, 6–7^{(3–7)}, [15–13]
2011	(Portugal) Maria João Koehler (Hungary) Katalin Marosi	(United Kingdom) Amanda Elliott (Australia) Johanna Konta	7–6^{(7–3)}, 6–1
2010	(Russia) Vitalia Diatchenko (France) Irena Pavlovic	(France) Claire Feuerstein (Russia) Vesna Manasieva	4–6, 6–4, [10–6]
2009	(Germany) Kristina Barrois (Austria) Yvonne Meusburger	(Sweden) Johanna Larsson (United Kingdom) Anna Smith	3–6, 6–4, [10–7]
2008	(Sweden) Johanna Larsson (United Kingdom) Anna Smith	(United Kingdom) Sarah Borwell (United States) Courtney Nagle	7–6^{(8–6)}, 6–4
