= Mimi Xu =

British tennis player (born 2007)

Mingge Xu
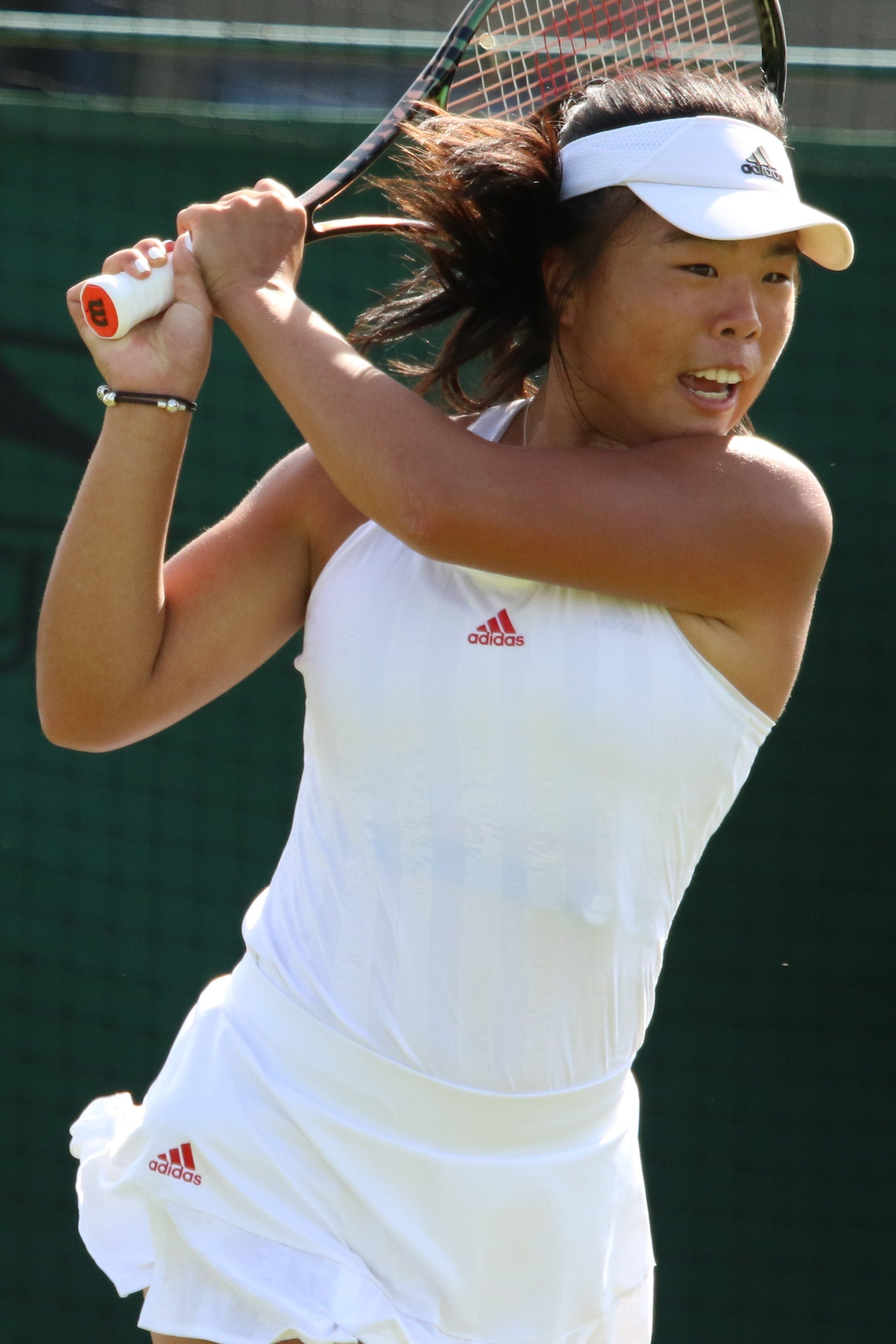
- Full name: Mingge Olivia Xu
- Country (sports): Great Britain
- Born: 2 October 2007 (age 19) Swansea, Wales, UK
- Height: 1.75 m (5 ft 9 in)
- Plays: Right-handed
- Prize money: $263,400

Singles
- Career record: 72–60
- Career titles: 2 ITF
- Highest ranking: No. 230 (5 January 2026)
- Current ranking: No. 305 (19 October 2026)

Grand Slam singles results
- Australian Open: Q1 (2026)
- Wimbledon: 1R (2025, 2026)

Doubles
- Career record: 42–27
- Career titles: 7 ITF
- Highest ranking: No. 203 (14 July 2025)
- Current ranking: No. 291 (19 October 2026)

Grand Slam doubles results
- Wimbledon: 2R (2025)
- Last updated on: 19 October 2026.

Mingge Xu
- Chinese: 徐铭格
Transcriptions
Standard Mandarin
- Hanyu Pinyin: Xú mínggé

Mingge Olivia "Mimi" Xu (born 2 October 2007) is a British tennis player. She has a career-high singles ranking by the WTA of No. 230, achieved on 5 January 2026, and a best doubles ranking of No. 203, set on 14 July 2025.

== Early life ==
Born in Swansea to Chinese parents, Xu started playing tennis at the Swansea Tennis and Squash Club, before moving to the National Tennis Academy in Loughborough. She attended Olchfa School in Swansea, before moving to the National Tennis Centre in Roehampton, where she started to be coached by Mathew James.

== Career ==
In June 2022, Xu won the girls' title at the LTA Junior National Championships, beating Talia Neilson-Gatenby in the final at the National Tennis Centre. Aged 14, she had also won the British under-16 title earlier that same month. Winning the junior title granted her a wildcard into qualifying for the main draw of the 2022 Wimbledon Championships, where she was defeated by 800+ places higher-ranked Hanna Chang in the first round. In the Wimbledon junior girls' singles competition, she reached the last-16 in both 2022 and 2023. She also made the doubles quarterfinals at the French Open and US Open in 2023.

Xu then reached the quarterfinals of the girls' singles at the 2024 Australian Open, and made the semifinals of the girls' doubles alongside Hannah Klugman.

In April 2024, Xu and Mika Stojsavljevic paired up to defeat Flora Johnson and Allegra Korpanec Davies in the girls' doubles at the Under 18s Junior National Championships. On the same day, she defeated Stojsavljevic to reach the girls' final which she won against Hannah Klugman. In June 2024, she was awarded a wildcard into qualifying for the singles draw of the 2024 Wimbledon Championships. As a result, she broke into the top 10 of the junior rankings for the first time.

Playing alongside Stojsavljevic, she reached the final of the 2024 Wimbledon girls' doubles, after a win over top seeds and defending champions, Alena Kovačková and Laura Samson, in the quarterfinals and a straight-sets win over Julia Stusek and Julie Pastioka in the semifinals. In the final, they lost on a championship tiebreak to Tyra Caterina Grant and Iva Jovic of the United States. She also reached the semifinals of the girls' singles at the 2024 US Open.

Partnering with Amelia Rajecki, Xu won the doubles title at the W100 Shrewsbury event in October 2024, defeating fellow Britons Hannah Klugman and Ranah Stoiber in the final.

In June 2025, she received a wildcard to make her WTA 125 debut at the Birmingham Open and defeated top seed, world No. 52 Alycia Parks, in the first round. Xu then overcame Katarzyna Kawa in three sets to reach the quarterfinals. She lost to Jessika Ponchet in the last eight. Two weeks later, again as a wildcard entrant, Xu made her WTA Tour main-draw debut at the Nottingham Open, defeating world No. 96 Katie Volynets in the first round, before losing to sixth seed Magda Linette in her next match. Xu was awarded a wildcard to make her major tournament main-draw debut at Wimbledon. She lost in the first round to fellow Briton Emma Raducanu.

On 26 October 2025, Xu won both singles and doubles titles at the 2025 Wrexham Open, defeating Mika Stojsavljevic in straight sets and winning the doubles title alongside Ella McDonald.

In February 2026, Xu was named Tennis Wales' Player of the Year.

Given a wildcard entry into the main-draw at the 2026 Wimbledon Championships, she lost in the first round to Daria Kasatkina in three sets.

== ITF Circuit finals ==
=== Singles: 3 (2 titles, 1 runner-up) ===
Legend W100 tournaments (1–0) W50 tournaments (0–1) W35 tournaments (1–0)	Finals by surface Hard (2–1)

Result	W–L	Date	Tournament	Tier	Surface	Opponent	Score
Win	1–0	Aug 2024	ITF Aldershot, UK	W35	Hard	(United States) Haley Giavara	6–4, 6–1
Win	2–0	Oct 2025	Wrexham Open, UK	W100	Hard (i)	(United Kingdom) Mika Stojsavljevic	6–3, 7–5
Loss	2–1	Oct 2026	ITF Quebec City, Canada	W50	Hard (i)	(Sweden) Kajsa Rinaldo Persson	4–6, 2–6

=== Doubles: 8 (7 titles, 1 runner-up) ===
Legend W100 tournaments (2–0) W50 tournaments (1–1) W35 tournaments (3–0) W15 tournaments (1–0)	Finals by surface Hard (7–1)

Result	W–L	Date	Tournament	Tier	Surface	Partner	Opponents	Score
Win	1–0	Mar 2024	ITF Monastir, Tunisia	W15	Hard	(Slovakia) Radka Zelníčková	(Serbia) Elena Milovanović (Austria) Tamira Paszek	2–6, 6–2, [10–6]
Loss	1–1	Jul 2024	ITF Nottingham, UK	W50	Hard	(United Kingdom) Katie Swan	(United Kingdom) Naiktha Bains (United Kingdom) Amelia Rajecki	6–1, 4–6, [8–10]
Win	2–1	Aug 2024	ITF Aldershot, UK	W35	Hard	(United Kingdom) Naiktha Bains	(Thailand) Punnin Kovapitukted (Japan) Akiko Omae	6–4, 6–3
Win	3–1	Oct 2024	ITF Reims, France	W35	Hard (i)	(United Kingdom) Sarah Beth Grey	Ekaterina Ovcharenko (United Kingdom) Emily Webley-Smith	6–3, 6–1
Win	4–1	Oct 2024	GB Pro-Series Shrewsbury, UK	W100	Hard (i)	(United Kingdom) Amelia Rajecki	(United Kingdom) Hannah Klugman (United Kingdom) Ranah Stoiber	6–4, 6–1
Win	5–1	Oct 2025	ITF Birmingham, UK	W35	Hard (i)	(Czech Republic) Vendula Valdmannová	(United Kingdom) Alicia Dudeney (Slovakia) Katarína Kužmová	6–3, 7–6^{(5)}
Win	6–1	Oct 2025	Wrexham Open, UK	W100	Hard (i)	(United Kingdom) Ella McDonald	(United Kingdom) Amarni Banks (Switzerland) Valentina Ryser	6–2, 6–4
Win	7–1	Oct 2026	ITF Quebec City, Canada	W50	Hard (i)	(United States) Reese Brantmeier	(Canada) Ariana Arseneault (Canada) Raphaëlle Lacasse	6–2, 6–7^{(5)}, [10–7]

== Junior Grand Slam tournament finals ==
=== Doubles: 1 (runner-up) ===
Result	Year	Tournament	Surface	Partner	Opponents	Score
Loss	2024	Wimbledon	Grass	(United Kingdom) Mika Stojsavljevic	(United States) Tyra Caterina Grant (United States) Iva Jovic	5–7, 6–4, [8–10]
