= Andrė Lukošiūtė =

Lithuanian tennis player

- Country (sports): Lithuania
- Born: 23 June 2001 (age 25) Kaunas, Lithuania
- Plays: Right-handed (two-handed backhand)
- Prize money: $33,846

Singles
- Career record: 107–69
- Career titles: 2 ITF
- Highest ranking: No. 665 (10 November 2025)
- Current ranking: No. 678 (1 December 2025)

Doubles
- Career record: 63–38
- Career titles: 8 ITF
- Highest ranking: No. 399 (30 January 2023)
- Current ranking: No. 737 (1 December 2025)

Team competitions
- Fed Cup: 5–2
- Last updated on: 1 December 2025.

Andrė Lukošiūtė (born 23 June 2001) is a Lithuanian tennis player.

Lukošiūtė has a career-high singles ranking by the Women's Tennis Association (WTA) of 665, achieved on 10 November 2025. She also has a career-high doubles ranking by WTA of 399, achieved on 30 January 2023. She has won one singles and eight doubles titles on the ITF Circuit.

Lukošiūtė competes for Lithuania in the Billie Jean King Cup, where she has a win-loss record of 5–2 as of July 2024.

== Personal life ==
Lukosiute was born in Kaunas and began playing tennis at the age of 6. Her favourite players growing up were Maria Sharapova and Rafael Nadal. She resides in the United Kingdom and has previously represented Essex at county tennis, starting at U14 level.

== Career ==
=== Junior ===
Lukosiute entered several tournaments on the ITF Junior Circuit in 2016 and 2017 but did not play regularly and reached a highest ranking of 876. She was the winner of the Grade 5 Preveza Cup in Greece in July 2016. In Tennis Europe junior tour events, Lukosiute won the Nike Junior International held in Edinburgh in 2015, defeating Amarni Banks in the final; and later that year was runner-up to Emma Raducanu in the Nike Junior International at the National Tennis Centre in London.

=== Senior ===
Lukosiute made her professional debut in December 2018 at an ITF event in Monastir, Tunisia but played only sporadically on the ITF Circuit until 2021. She won two doubles titles during the 2022 ITF season with Eliz Maloney, which saw her crack the top 500 in the doubles rankings.

== ITF Circuit finals ==
=== Singles: 8 (3 titles, 5 runner-ups) ===
Legend W15 tournaments	Finals by surface Hard (3–5)

Result	W–L	Date	Tournament	Tier	Surface	Opponent	Score
Loss	0–1	Oct 2022	ITF Sharm El Sheikh, Egypt	W15	Hard	Anastasiia Gureva	3–6, 1–6
Win	1–1	Oct 2023	ITF Näsbypark, Sweden	W15	Hard (i)	(Ukraine) Daria Lopatetska	6–1, 6–4
Win	2–1	Sep 2025	ITF Sharm El Sheikh, Egypt	W15	Hard	Kira Bataikina	6–1, 3–1 ret.
Loss	2–2	Sep 2025	ITF Sharm El Sheikh, Egypt	W15	Hard	(Latvia) Kamilla Bartone	6–7^{(5)}, 7–5, 6–7^{(5)}
Loss	2–3	Nov 2025	ITF Sharm El Sheikh, Egypt	W15	Hard	Daria Khomutsianskaya	6–4, 0–6, 4–6
Win	3–3	May 2026	ITF Monastir, Tunisia	W15	Hard	(Italy) Anastasia Bertacchi	7–6^{(3)}, 1–6, 6–2
Loss	3–4	Jun 2026	ITF Monastir, Tunisia	W15	Hard	(Spain) Berta Passola	1–6, 1–6
Loss	3–5	Sep 2026	ITF Monastir, Tunisia	W15	Hard	(United Kingdom) Imogen Haddad	6–7^{(4)}, 1–4 ret.

=== Doubles: 15 (11 titles, 4 runner-ups) ===
Legend W50 tournaments W25/35 tournaments W15 tournaments	Finals by surface Hard (11–4)

Result	W–L	Date	Tournament	Tier	Surface	Partner	Opponents	Score
Loss	0–1	Dec 2021	ITF Monastir, Tunisia	W15	Hard	(United Kingdom) Eliz Maloney	(Russia) Ksenia Laskutova (Hong Kong) Maggie Ng	5–7, 3–6
Win	1–1	Feb 2022	ITF Birmingham, United Kingdom	W25	Hard	(United Kingdom) Eliz Maloney	(United States) Quinn Gleason (United States) Catherine Harrison	7–6^{(4)}, 3–6, [10–8]
Win	2–1	Mar 2022	ITF Monastir, Tunisia	W15	Hard	(United Kingdom) Eliz Maloney	(China) Lu Jingjing (China) Wang Meiling	w/o
Loss	2–2	Aug 2022	ITF Aldershot, United Kingdom	W25	Hard	(United Kingdom) Eliz Maloney	(United Kingdom) Freya Christie (United Kingdom) Ali Collins	4–6, 2–6
Win	3–2	Sep 2023	ITF Monastir, Tunisia	W15	Hard	(United Kingdom) Nell Miller	(Serbia) Darja Suvirdjonkova (Belgium) Amelia Waligora	6–3, 6–2
Win	4–2	Oct 2023	ITF Villena, Spain	W15	Hard	(Lithuania) Patricija Paukštytė	(Germany) Laura Böhner (Germany) Joëlle Steur	6–4, 2–6, [10–7]
Win	5–2	Feb 2024	ITF Sharm El Sheikh, Egypt	W15	Hard	(Romania) Karola Bejenaru	(Japan) Mana Ayukawa (Romania) Briana Szabó	6–4, 6–3
Win	6–2	Mar 2024	ITF Sharm El Sheikh, Egypt	W15	Hard	(South Korea) Jeong Bo-young	(Poland) Daria Kuczer (Estonia) Liisa Varul	6–2, 6–0
Win	7–2	Nov 2024	ITF Monastir, Tunisia	W15	Hard	(Netherlands) Madelief Hageman	(Slovenia) Ela Nala Milić (Italy) Anna Turati	4–6, 6–0, [10–5]
Win	8–2	Mar 2025	ITF Monastir, Tunisia	W15	Hard	(Germany) Luisa Meyer auf der Heide	(United States) Eryn Cayetano (United States) Salma Ewing	7–5, 6–2
Loss	8–3	Jun 2025	ITF Monastir, Tunisia	W15	Hard	(United States) Julia Adams	(Spain) Claudia Ferrer Pérez (Hong Kong) Adithya Karunaratne	6–7^{(5)}, 1–6
Loss	8–4	Jul 2025	ITF Hillcrest, South Africa	W35	Hard	(Benin) Gloriana Nahum	(Japan) Ayumi Miyamoto (Japan) Miyu Nakashima	0–6, 3–6
Win	9–4	Feb 2026	ITF Sharm El Sheikh, Egypt	W15	Hard	(Ukraine) Kateryna Lazarenko	Yuliya Hatouka; Daria Zelinskaya	6–1, 6–4
Win	10–4	Jul 2026	ITF Corroios, Portugal	W50	Hard	(New Zealand) Elyse Tse	(Portugal) María García (Portugal) Milana Ivantsiv	6–2, 7–5
Win	11–4	Sep 2026	ITF Monastir, Tunisia	W15	Hard	(Finland) Clarissa Blomqvist	(Turkey) İrem Kurt (China) Mi Lan	7–6^{(4)}, 0–6, [10–8]
