= Hannah Klugman =

British tennis player (born 2009)

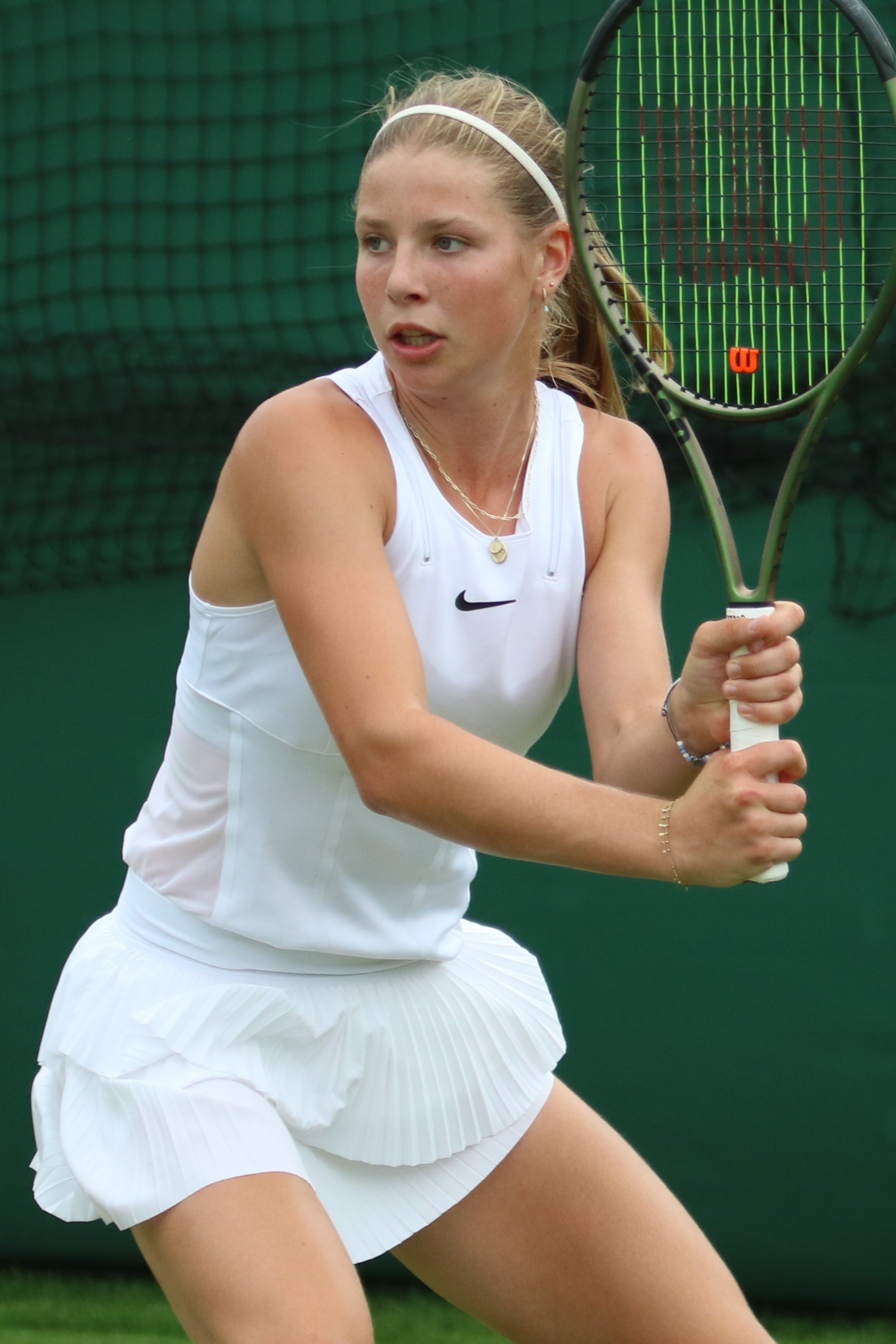
- Klugman at the 2023 Wimbledon Championships
- Country (sports): Great Britain
- Residence: Wimbledon, England
- Born: 18 February 2009 (age 17)
- Plays: Right-handed
- Coach: Ben Haran
- Prize money: $331,118

Singles
- Career record: 72–46
- Career titles: 2 ITF
- Highest ranking: No. 234 (2 November 2026)
- Current ranking: No. 236 (9 November 2026)

Grand Slam singles results
- Wimbledon: 1R (2025, 2026)

Doubles
- Career record: 10–9
- Career titles: 0
- Highest ranking: No. 601 (28 October 2024)
- Current ranking: No. 717 (9 November 2026)

Grand Slam doubles results
- Wimbledon: 1R (2025)
- Last updated on: 10 November 2026.

Hannah Klugman (born 18 February 2009) is a British professional tennis player. She has a career-high singles ranking of world No. 234, achieved on 2 November 2026. Klugman has won two singles titles on the ITF Women's World Tennis Tour.

== Early life ==
Klugman was born in Kingston-upon-Thames and brought up in Wimbledon Village, where she was introduced to tennis at the Westside Club. Her first coach was Alison Taylor, wife of former Wimbledon semi-finalist Roger Taylor. She began training under Ben Haran from the age of nine. She is the youngest of four girls, and was inspired to take up tennis by her older sisters.

Klugman also took part in hockey, netball, swimming and running during her childhood. Following the end of the COVID-19 lockdown, she opted to focus solely on tennis. In October 2023, Klugman reiterated her desire to stay at Wimbledon High School to complete her GCSEs. However, she switched to online learning a few months later.

== Career ==
=== 2022: ITF Junior debut ===
Klugman made her debut on the ITF Junior Circuit at the J3 event in Loughborough in March, which she won. Aged 13 years and one month, this made her the youngest British winner of a J3 event or above – eclipsing an earlier success of Emma Raducanu, who had won a lower-graded J5 at a similar age. She won a second J3 in Loughborough the following week, this time without dropping a set. In December, she reached the final of the U14 Orange Bowl.

=== 2023: Orange Bowl winner ===
In April, Klugman defeated fellow Brit Mika Stojsavljevic to win the LTA Junior National Championships under-16 girls' singles, held at the LTA's National Tennis Centre in Roehampton.

Later that year, still at the age of 14, she recorded her first career win at a junior major singles event with a victory over the seeded Italian player Federica Urgesi at the 2023 Wimbledon Championships. In the doubles, she and teammate Isabelle Lacy started their campaign with a win over Emerson Jones and Ema Milic. They progressed through the rounds to reach the final of the girls' doubles, beating American pair Tatum Evans and Alanis Hamilton in straight sets in the semifinal. In the final, they were defeated by Czech pair Alena Kovačková and Laura Samsonová, in straight sets.

In September, Klugman reached the quarterfinals of the girls’ singles and girls' doubles at the 2023 US Open. Her run included a win over third seed Sayaka Ishii. Her run was ended when she had to retire from her quarterfinal match after 47 minutes. In October, she competed against senior players in Shrewsbury, England, after being given a wildcard. She came through qualifying and aged 14 years-old, she became the youngest player to qualify for a $100k event on the ITF Women's World Tennis Tour, beating the record set by Coco Gauff. She reached the quarterfinals in Shrewsbury, before her run was ended by world No. 115, Oceane Dodin.

In December, Klugman, still only 14 year-old, won the Under-18 Orange Bowl in Florida, beating Laura Samson in the quarterfinals and fourth seed Iva Jovic in the last four, before defeating American Tyra Caterina Grant 6–3, 6–3 in the final.

=== 2024: Grand Slam tournament qualifying debut ===
In January, Klugman entered the junior events at the 2024 Australian Open. She reached the semifinals of the Girls' doubles alongside Mingge Xu.

In June, she was awarded a wildcard into the singles qualifying of the Wimbledon Championships. In the first round she defeated Petra Marčinko, and in the second round Linda Fruhvirtová. She lost in the final qualifying round to American Alycia Parks.

In October, she partnered with Ranah Stoiber to reach the final of the GB Pro-Series Shrewsbury where they faced Mimi Xu and Amelia Rajecki. They lost in straight sets.

=== 2025: Major and WTA Tour debuts ===
In January, she reached the final of the girls' doubles at the 2025 Australian Open alongside Emerson Jones. In the final, they lost in straight sets to American twins Annika and Kristina Penickova. In March, she reached the semifinal of the Spanish W35 Terrassa event, which she lost in three sets to Lilli Tagger. In April, she was runner-up at the British Junior National Championships to Mika Stojsavljevic.

In June, she reached her first junior singles semifinal at the French Open, before recording a three-set win over Bulgarian Rositsa Dencheva to reach the final, becoming the first British junior major finalist at the French Open since Michelle Tyler in 1976. She was defeated in the final by Lilli Tagger of Austria in straight sets.

Klugman made her WTA Tour main-draw debut as a wildcard entrant at the 2025 Nottingham Open, losing in the first round to fourth seed Yulia Putintseva in straight sets. She was awarded a wildcard to make her major tournament main-draw debut at Wimbledon, where she lost to 29th seed Leylah Fernandez in the first round.

=== 2026: First WTA Tour win, first senior titles, top 250 ===
Ranked at world No. 509 and entering as a lucky loser at the Nottingham Open, Klugman recorded her first WTA Tour main-draw win by defeating fellow Briton Harriet Dart in straight sets in the first round. She lost to fourth seed Marie Bouzková in the second round. Given a wildcard entry into the main draw at Wimbledon, Klugman lost to 2024 champion, Barbora Krejčíková, in the first round.

In September, she won her first senior title at the W50 Leiria tournament, defeating second seed Linda Fruhvirtová in the final, in three sets.

In October, Klugman defeated compatriot Jodie Burrage to reach the final of the Wrexham Open, a W100 event. She captured the biggest title of her career by defeating French player Elsa Jacquemot in straight sets in the final. At the same tournament, she also reached the semifinals of the doubles alongside Daniella Britton, before their run was ended by fellow Britons Freya Christie and Eden Silva. As a result of her trophy win, Klugman entered the top 250 in the WTA singles rankings for the first time at world No. 248 on 26 October 2026.

== Coaching ==
Klugman has been coached by Ben Haran in Reeds Tennis School in Cobham since she was nine years old. Haran has previously worked with British tennis professionals Jack Draper and Dan Evans.

== ITF Circuit finals ==
=== Singles: 3 (2 titles, 1 runner-up) ===
Legend W100 tournaments (1–0) W50 tournaments (1–0) W35 tournaments (0–1)	Finals by surface Hard (2–1)

Result	W–L	Date	Tournament	Tier	Surface	Opponent	Score
Loss	0–1	Aug 2025	ITF Roehampton, United Kingdom	W35	Hard	(United Kingdom) Alicia Dudeney	1–6, 4–6
Win	1–1	Sep 2026	ITF Leiria, Portugal	W50	Hard	(Czech Republic) Linda Fruhvirtová	7–5, 4–6, 6–1
Win	2–1	Oct 2026	ITF Wrexham, United Kingdom	W100	Hard (i)	(France) Elsa Jacquemot	6–2, 6–4

=== Doubles: 1 (runner-up) ===
Legend W100 tournaments (0–1)	Finals by surface Hard (0–1)

Result	W–L	Date	Tournament	Tier	Surface	Partner	Opponents	Score
Loss	0–1	Oct 2024	GB Pro-Series Shrewsbury, United Kingdom	W100	Hard (i)	(United Kingdom) Ranah Akua Stoiber	(United Kingdom) Amelia Rajecki (United Kingdom) Mingge Xu	4–6, 1–6

== Junior Grand Slam tournament finals ==
=== Singles: 1 (runner-up) ===
Result	Year	Tournament	Surface	Opponent	Score
Loss	2025	French Open	Clay	(Austria) Lilli Tagger	2-6, 0-6

=== Doubles: 2 (2 runner-ups) ===
Result	Year	Tournament	Surface	Partner	Opponents	Score
Loss	2023	Wimbledon	Grass	(United Kingdom) Isabelle Lacy	(Czech Republic) Alena Kovačková (Czech Republic) Laura Samsonová	4–6, 5–7
Loss	2025	Australian Open	Hard	(Australia) Emerson Jones	(United States) Annika Penickova (United States) Kristina Penickova	4–6, 2–6
