= 2023 Ando Securities Open =

Tennis tournament

- Date: 4–10 September 2023
- Edition: 6th
- Category: ITF Women's World Tennis Tour
- Prize money: $100,000
- Surface: Hard / Outdoor
- Location: Tokyo, Japan

Champions

Singles
- (Switzerland) Viktorija Golubic

Doubles
- (France) Jessika Ponchet / (Netherlands) Bibiane Schoofs
- ITF Tokyo Ariake Open

The 2023 Ando Securities Open was a professional tennis tournament played on indoor hard courts. It was the sixth edition of the tournament which was part of the 2023 ITF Women's World Tennis Tour. It took place in Tokyo, Japan between 4 and 10 September 2023.

== Champions ==
=== Singles ===
- (Switzerland) Viktorija Golubic def. (China) Wang Xiyu, 6–4, 3–6, 6–4

=== Doubles ===
- (France) Jessika Ponchet / (Netherlands) Bibiane Schoofs def. (United Kingdom) Alicia Barnett / (United Kingdom) Olivia Nicholls, 4–6, 6–1, [10–7]

== Singles main draw entrants ==
=== Seeds ===
Country	Player	Rank^{1}	Seed
JPN	Nao Hibino	81	1
GER	Jule Niemeier	91	2
CHN	Wang Xiyu	95	3
CHN	Yuan Yue	100	4
AUS	Kimberly Birrell	111	5
HUN	Panna Udvardy	122	6
SUI	Viktorija Golubic	135	7
FRA	Jessika Ponchet	140	8

- ^{1} Rankings are as of 28 August 2023.

=== Other entrants ===
The following players received wildcards into the singles main draw:

- (Japan) Sakura Hosogi
- (Japan) Natsumi Kawaguchi
- (Japan) Yuki Naito
- (Japan) Kyōka Okamura

The following players received entry from the qualifying draw:

- (Ukraine) Kateryna Volodko
- (Mexico) Fernanda Contreras
- (Philippines) Alex Eala
- (Japan) Aoi Ito
- Sofya Lansere
- (Japan) Makoto Ninomiya
- (China) You Xiaodi
- (Canada) Carol Zhao
