= 2022 Lyon Open =

2022 Lyon Open may refer to:

- 2022 ATP Lyon Open
- 2022 WTA Lyon Open
