= 2024 Ando Securities Open – Singles =

Singles
- 2024 Ando Securities Open

Final
- Champion: (Australia) Maddison Inglis
- Runner-up: (Japan) Ena Shibahara
- Score: 6–4, 3–6, 6–2

Events
Singles	Doubles
← 2023 ·	Ando Securities Open	· 2025 →

Viktorija Golubic was the defending champion but chose not to participate.

Maddison Inglis won the title after defeating Ena Shibahara in the final, 6–4, 3–6, 6–2.

== Seeds ==
1. (United States) Emina Bektas (quarterfinals)
2. (Australia) Arina Rodionova (second round)
3. (Japan) Mai Hontama (semifinals)
4. (Japan) Moyuka Uchijima (quarterfinals)
5. (United Kingdom) Lily Miyazaki (second round)
6. (Netherlands) Arianne Hartono (first round)
7. Valeria Savinykh (second round)
8. (Canada) Rebecca Marino (quarterfinals)

== Draw ==
=== Key ===
- Q = Qualifier
- WC = Wild card
- LL = Lucky loser
- Alt = Alternate
- SE = Special exempt
- PR = Protected ranking
- ITF = ITF entry
- JE = Junior exempt
- w/o = Walkover
- r = Retired
- d = Defaulted
- SR = Special ranking

=== Finals ===
Semifinals
WC	(Japan) Ena Shibahara	3	7	6
3	(Japan) Mai Hontama	6	5	3
(China) Ma Yexin	6	3	2
(Australia) Maddison Inglis	4	6	6

Final
WC	(Japan) Ena Shibahara	4	6	2
(Australia) Maddison Inglis	6	3	6

=== Top half ===
First round
1	(United States) E Bektas	6	6
(South Korea) S-j Jang	3	4
WC	(Japan) S Ishii	6	3	6^{4}
Q	(Hong Kong) E Chong	3	6	7^{7}
WC	(Japan) E Shibahara	6	6
Q	(Japan) N Sato	4	1
WC	(Japan) K Nishimura	3	2
7	V Savinykh	6	6
3	(Japan) M Hontama	6	6
(Australia) T Gibson	1	3
(Canada) S Fung	6	6^{5}	4
WC	(Japan) E Koike	4	7^{7}	6
(Chinese Taipei) Y-y Yang	6	0	2
(Canada) C Zhao	4	6	6
Q	(Thailand) L Kumkhum	3	6^{3}
8	(Canada) R Marino	6	7^{7}

Second round
1	(United States) E Bektas	6	6
Q	(Hong Kong) E Chong	3	3
WC	(Japan) E Shibahara	6	6
7	V Savinykh	3	1
3	(Japan) M Hontama	6	6
WC	(Japan) E Koike	1	4
(Canada) C Zhao	3	2
8	(Canada) R Marino	6	6

Quarterfinals
1	(United States) E Bektas	6^{5}	2
WC	(Japan) E Shibahara	7^{7}	6
3	(Japan) M Hontama	7^{7}	3	6
8	(Canada) R Marino	6^{2}	6	4

Semifinals
WC	(Japan) E Shibahara	3	7	6
3	(Japan) M Hontama	6	5	3

=== Bottom half ===
First round
6	(Netherlands) A Hartono	3	3
(China) Y Ma	6	6
Q	(Japan) E Sema	6	1	6
Q	(United States) D Hewitt	2	6	3
(Thailand) M Sawangkaew	6	2	6
Q	(Serbia) A Krunić	4	6	3
(Japan) S Saito	6	6^{5}	2
4	(Japan) M Uchijima	3	7^{7}	6
5	(United Kingdom) L Miyazaki	6	6
Q	(Japan) M Miyata	0	1
(Japan) H Kaji	6	3	2
(Australia) K Birrell	1	6	6
Q	(Japan) K Okamura	4	2
(Australia) M Inglis	6	6
(Chinese Taipei) E-s Liang	7^{7}	3	3
2	(Australia) Ar Rodionova	6^{5}	6	6

Second round
(China) Y Ma	6	6
Q	(Japan) E Sema	3	4
(Thailand) M Sawangkaew	1	7^{7}	4
4	(Japan) M Uchijima	6	6^{4}	6
5	(United Kingdom) L Miyazaki	1	6	3
(Australia) K Birrell	6	4	6
(Australia) M Inglis	7	3	6
2	(Australia) Ar Rodionova	5	6	4

Quarterfinals
(China) Y Ma	6^{2}	6	6
4	(Japan) M Uchijima	7^{7}	4	3
(Australia) K Birrell	6^{4}	2
(Australia) M Inglis	7^{7}	6

Semifinals
(China) Y Ma	6	3	2
(Australia) M Inglis	4	6	6
