= 2024 Ando Securities Open – Doubles =

Doubles
- 2024 Ando Securities Open

Final
- Champions: (Australia) Kimberly Birrell (South Korea) Jang Su-jeong
- Runners-up: (Serbia) Aleksandra Krunić (Australia) Arina Rodionova
- Score: 7–5, 3–6, [10–8]

Events
Singles	Doubles
← 2023 ·	Ando Securities Open	· 2025 →

Jessika Ponchet and Bibiane Schoofs were the defending champions but Ponchet chose to participate in Madrid, while Schoofs competed in Oeiras.

Kimberly Birrell and Jang Su-jeong won the title after defeating Aleksandra Krunić and Arina Rodionova in the final, 7–5, 3–6, [10–8].

== Seeds ==
1. (Thailand) Luksika Kumkhum / (Thailand) Peangtarn Plipuech (first round)
2. (Chinese Taipei) Liang En-shuo / (China) Tang Qianhui (first round)
3. (Japan) Mai Hontama / (Japan) Moyuka Uchijima (quarterfinals)
4. (Netherlands) Arianne Hartono / (India) Prarthana Thombare (quarterfinals)

== Draw ==
=== Key ===
- Q = Qualifier
- WC = Wild card
- LL = Lucky loser
- Alt = Alternate
- SE = Special exempt
- PR = Protected ranking
- ITF = ITF entry
- JE = Junior exempt
- w/o = Walkover
- r = Retired
- d = Defaulted
- SR = Special ranking

First round
1	(Thailand) L Kumkhum (Thailand) P Plipuech	4	6	[7]
(United Kingdom) M Brooks (Hong Kong) E Chong	6	4	[10]
(Serbia) A Krunić (Australia) Ar Rodionova	6	6
WC	(Japan) K Morisaki (Japan) N Sato	1	1
3	(Japan) M Hontama (Japan) M Uchijima	6	6
WC	(Japan) S Kaneko (Japan) Y Saito	0	1
(Japan) M Kobori (Japan) A Shimizu	6	6
WC	(Japan) S Imamura (Japan) K Nishimura	4	3
(Australia) T Gibson (Australia) M Inglis	6	6
(United States) D Hewitt (Chinese Taipei) Y-y Yang	4	1
(Canada) R Marino (Canada) C Zhao	6	3	[4]
4	(Netherlands) A Hartono (India) P Thombare	2	6	[10]
(China) Y Ma; V Savinykh	4	3
(Australia) K Birrell (South Korea) S-j Jang	6	6
(United Kingdom) SB Grey (United Kingdom) L Miyazaki	6	6
2	(Chinese Taipei) E-s Liang (China) Q Tang	3	3

Quarterfinals
(United Kingdom) M Brooks (Hong Kong) E Chong	3	6	[4]
(Serbia) A Krunić (Australia) Ar Rodionova	6	2	[10]
3	(Japan) M Hontama (Japan) M Uchijima	4	6	[9]
(Japan) M Kobori (Japan) A Shimizu	6	3	[11]
(Australia) T Gibson (Australia) M Inglis	6	6
4	(Netherlands) A Hartono (India) P Thombare	2	4
(Australia) K Birrell (South Korea) S-j Jang	6	3	[10]
(United Kingdom) SB Grey (United Kingdom) L Miyazaki	3	6	[8]

Semifinals
(Serbia) A Krunić (Australia) Ar Rodionova	6	6
(Japan) M Kobori (Japan) A Shimizu	3	1
(Australia) T Gibson (Australia) M Inglis	7^{7}	1	[5]
(Australia) K Birrell (South Korea) S-j Jang	6^{4}	6	[10]

Final
(Serbia) A Krunić (Australia) Ar Rodionova	5	6	[8]
(Australia) K Birrell (South Korea) S-j Jang	7	3	[10]
