= 2022 WTA Lyon Open =

Women's tennis tournament in Lyon, France

- Date: 28 February – 6 March
- Edition: 3rd
- Category: WTA 250
- Draw: 32S / 16D
- Prize money: $239,447
- Surface: Hard (Indoor)
- Location: Lyon, France
- Venue: Palais des Sports de Gerland

Champions

Singles
- (China) Zhang Shuai

Doubles
- (Germany) Laura Siegemund / Vera Zvonareva
- WTA Lyon Open

The 2022 WTA Lyon Open (also known as the Open 6ème Sens — Métropole de Lyon for sponsorship reasons) was a women's tennis tournament played on indoor hard courts. It was the third edition of the Lyon Open (WTA) and an International tournament on the 2022 WTA Tour. It took place at the Palais des Sports de Gerland in Lyon, France, from February 28th to March 6th, 2022. During this tournament, the WTA and other international governing bodies of tennis including the ATP did not have players of Russia and Belarus compete under their country's flags as a result of the Russian invasion of Ukraine.

== Champions ==
=== Singles ===
- (China) Zhang Shuai def. (Ukraine) Dayana Yastremska 3–6, 6–3, 6–4

This is Zhang's first WTA Tour singles title since 2017, and third overall.

=== Doubles ===
- (Germany) Laura Siegemund / Vera Zvonareva def. (United Kingdom) Alicia Barnett / (United Kingdom) Olivia Nicholls 7–5, 6–1

== Singles main draw entrants ==
=== Seeds ===
Country	Player	Ranking^{1}	Seed
ITA	Camila Giorgi	30	1
ROU	Sorana Cîrstea	31	2
SUI	Viktorija Golubic	36	3
FRA	Alizé Cornet	37	4
ITA	Jasmine Paolini	44	5
CRO	Ana Konjuh	51	6
BEL	Alison Van Uytvanck	53	7
CHN	Zhang Shuai	65	8

- ^{1} Rankings as of 21 February 2022.

=== Other entrants ===
The following players received wildcards into the singles main draw:

- (France) Elsa Jacquemot
- (Ukraine) Dayana Yastremska
- Vera Zvonareva

The following players received entry using a protected ranking into the singles main draw:

- (Italy) Elisabetta Cocciaretto
- Vitalia Diatchenko

The following players received entry from the qualifying draw:

- (Georgia (country)) Mariam Bolkvadze
- (United Kingdom) Katie Boulter
- (Spain) Cristina Bucșa
- (Germany) Tamara Korpatsch
- (Japan) Yuriko Miyazaki
- (Switzerland) Stefanie Vögele

The following player received entry as a lucky loser:

- (Japan) Mai Hontama

=== Withdrawals ===
Before the tournament

- Ekaterina Alexandrova → replaced by (France) Kristina Mladenovic
- (Romania) Irina-Camelia Begu → replaced by (Romania) Irina Bara
- (Romania) Jaqueline Cristian → replaced by (Romania) Ana Bogdan
- (Czech Republic) Tereza Martincová → replaced by Vitalia Diatchenko
- (Czech Republic) Markéta Vondroušová → replaced by (Italy) Martina Trevisan
- (Belgium) Maryna Zanevska → replaced by (Japan) Mai Hontama

== Doubles main draw entrants ==
=== Seeds ===
Country	Player	Country	Player	Rank^{1}	Seed
JPN	Eri Hozumi	JPN	Makoto Ninomiya	78	1
TPE	Chan Hao-ching	GER	Julia Lohoff	120	2
ROU	Irina Bara	GEO	Ekaterine Gorgodze	124	3
ROU	Monica Niculescu		Alexandra Panova	127	4

- Rankings as of February 21, 2022.

=== Other entrants ===
The following pairs received wildcards into the doubles main draw:

- (France) Elsa Jacquemot / (Germany) Tatjana Maria
- (Ukraine) Dayana Yastremska / (Ukraine) Ivanna Yastremska

=== Withdrawals ===
Before the tournament

- (Hungary) Tímea Babos / (Chinese Taipei) Chan Hao-ching → replaced by (Spain) Georgina García Pérez / (Switzerland) Xenia Knoll
- Anna Blinkova / (Norway) Ulrikke Eikeri → replaced by (Norway) Ulrikke Eikeri / (United Kingdom) Samantha Murray Sharan
- (Germany) Vivian Heisen / (Germany) Julia Lohoff → replaced by (Chinese Taipei) Chan Hao-ching / (Germany) Julia Lohoff
- (India) Sania Mirza / (China) Zhang Shuai → replaced by (France) Estelle Cascino / (France) Jessika Ponchet
- (United Kingdom) Samantha Murray Sharan / (Netherlands) Bibiane Schoofs → replaced by (United Kingdom) Alicia Barnett / (United Kingdom) Olivia Nicholls
