= Rosalie van der Hoek =

Dutch tennis player

- Country (sports): Netherlands
- Born: 16 December 1994 (age 31)
- Height: 1.80 m (5 ft 11 in)
- Plays: Left (two-handed backhand)
- Coach: Martin Vilar
- Prize money: $205,105

Singles
- Career record: 46–102
- Highest ranking: No. 759 (14 January 2019)

Doubles
- Career record: 252–182
- Career titles: 30 ITF
- Highest ranking: No. 83 (18 October 2021)

Grand Slam doubles results
- Australian Open: 3R (2021)
- French Open: 1R (2021)
- Wimbledon: 2R (2023)
- US Open: 1R (2021, 2022)

Grand Slam mixed doubles results
- Wimbledon: 1R (2021)

Rosalie van der Hoek (born 16 December 1994) is an inactive Dutch tennis player and a professional padel player.

Van der Hoek, who prefers clay courts, has a career-high doubles ranking of world No. 83, achieved on 18 October 2021. She has won 30 doubles titles on the ITF Women's Circuit.

Van der Hoek made her WTA Tour main-draw debut at the 2017 Washington Open in the doubles, partnering with Chayenne Ewijk.

In early 2020, she tested positive for COVID-19, and again, prior to the commencement of the Palermo Ladies Open.

Since July 2023, she has not competed in any tournaments of the pro circuit.

== WTA Tour finals ==
=== Doubles: 2 (runner-ups) ===
Legend WTA 500 WTA 250 (0–2)	Finals by surface Hard (0–1) Clay (0–1)

Result	W–L	Date	Tournament	Tier	Surface	Partner	Opponents	Score
Loss	0–1	Jul 2021	Hamburg European Open, Germany	WTA 250	Clay	(Australia) Astra Sharma	(Italy) Jasmine Paolini (Switzerland) Jil Teichmann	0–6, 4–6
Loss	0–2	Aug 2022	Championnats de Granby, Canada	WTA 250	Hard	(United Kingdom) Harriet Dart	(United Kingdom) Alicia Barnett (United Kingdom) Olivia Nicholls	7–5, 3–6, [1–10]

== ITF Circuit finals ==
=== Doubles: 51 (30 titles, 21 runner-ups) ===
Legend $100,000 tournaments $60,000 tournaments $25,000 tournaments $10/15,000 tournaments	Finals by surface Hard (18–11) Clay (7–8) Grass (1–0) Carpet (4–2)

Result	W–L	Date	Tournament	Tier	Surface	Partner	Opponents	Score
Loss	0–1	Oct 2012	ITF Heraklion, Greece	10,000	Carpet	(Netherlands) Valeria Podda	(France) Manon Arcangioli (France) Laëtitia Sarrazin	6–7^{(4)}, 2–6
Loss	0–2	Apr 2013	ITF Heraklion, Greece	10,000	Carpet	(Japan) Yuka Mori	(Netherlands) Michaëlla Krajicek (Netherlands) Indy de Vroome	0–6, 7–5, [8–10]
Loss	0–3	Jun 2013	ITF Amstelveen, Netherlands	10,000	Hard	(Netherlands) Valeria Podda	(Czech Republic) Tereza Malíková (Germany) Alina Wessel	0–6, 3–6
Loss	0–4	Aug 2013	ITF Enschede, Netherlands	10,000	Clay	(Netherlands) Anna Alzate Esmurzaeva	(United States) Bernarda Pera (Belarus) Sviatlana Pirazhenka	2–6, 1–6
Win	1–4	Oct 2013	ITF Heraklion, Greece	10,000	Carpet	(Australia) Alexandra Nancarrow	(Japan) Nozomi Fujioka (Thailand) Tanaporn Thongsing	6–3, 4–6, [10–7]
Win	2–4	Oct 2013	ITF Heraklion, Greece	10,000	Carpet	(Netherlands) Mandy Wagemaker	(Czech Republic) Dominika Paterová (Czech Republic) Nikola Schweinerová	3–6, 6–0, [10–6]
Loss	2–5	Jan 2014	ITF Fort-de-France, Martinique	10,000	Hard	(Lithuania) Akvilė Paražinskaitė	(France) Manon Peral (Italy) Camilla Rosatello	4–6, 4–6
Loss	2–6	Mar 2014	ITF Pula, Italy	10,000	Clay	(Greece) Despina Papamichail	(Spain) Olga Sáez Larra (Australia) Alexandra Nancarrow	3–6, 6–4, [8–10]
Win	3–6	Apr 2014	ITF Pula, Italy	10,000	Clay	(Latvia) Jeļena Ostapenko	(Spain) Yvonne Cavallé Reimers (Spain) Olga Sáez Larra	6–1, 2–6, [10–6]
Win	4–6	Dec 2014	ITF Sharm El Sheikh, Egypt	10,000	Hard	(United Kingdom) Eden Silva	(Kazakhstan) Alexandra Grinchishina (Kazakhstan) Ekaterina Klyueva	6–4, 2–6, [10–5]
Win	5–6	May 2015	ITF Mytilene, Greece	10,000	Hard	(Greece) Valentini Grammatikopoulou	(Japan) Yoshimi Kawasaki (Romania) Daiana Negreanu	6–4, 6–3
Win	6–6	Jun 2015	ITF Grand-Baie, Mauritius	10,000	Hard	(Czech Republic) Marie Bouzková	(South Africa) Ilze Hattingh (South Africa) Madrie Le Roux	6–3, 7–5
Win	7–6	Jul 2015	ITF Amstelveen, Netherlands	10,000	Hard	(Netherlands) Janneke Wikkerink	(United States) Tina Tehrani (Netherlands) Mandy Wagemaker	6–2, 6–1
Win	8–6	Jul 2015	ITF Savitaipale, Finland	10,000	Clay	(Bosnia and Herzegovina) Dea Herdželaš	(Germany) Nora Niedmers (Belgium) Hélène Scholsen	7–6^{(3)}, 7–5
Loss	8–7	Aug 2015	ITF Las Palmas, Spain	10,000	Clay	(Netherlands) Chayenne Ewijk	(Poland) Olga Brózda (Ukraine) Anastasiya Shoshyna	7–6^{(8)}, 3–6, [10–7]
Win	9–7	Aug 2015	ITF Las Palmas, Spain	10,000	Clay	(Netherlands) Chayenne Ewijk	(Spain) Marta González Encinas (Spain) Estela Perez-Somarriba	7–6^{(5)}, 6–0
Win	10–7	Aug 2015	ITF Rotterdam, Netherlands	10,000	Clay	(Netherlands) Kelly Versteeg	(Germany) Katharina Hering (Switzerland) Karin Kennel	6-7^{(6)}, 6–1, [10–5]
Win	11–7	Jan 2016	ITF Petit-Bourg, France	10,000	Hard	(Netherlands) Kelly Versteeg	(Romania) Jaqueline Cristian (Italy) Gaia Sanesi	7–6^{(5)}, 6–1
Win	12–7	Mar 2016	ITF Nanjing, China	10,000	Hard	(Netherlands) Chayenne Ewijk	(Russia) Kseniia Bekker (Belarus) Lidziya Marozava	6–4, 6–2
Win	13–7	Apr 2016	ITF Dijon, France	10,000	Hard (i)	(Netherlands) Chayenne Ewijk	(France) Manon Peral (France) Maud Vigne	6–2, 6–0
Loss	13–8	Jun 2016	ITF Grand-Baie, Mauritius	10,000	Hard	(Netherlands) Chayenne Ewijk	(India) Kyra Shroff (India) Dhruthi Tatachar Venugopal	1–6, 1–6
Win	14–8	Jun 2016	ITF Grand-Baie, Mauritius	10,000	Hard	(Netherlands) Chayenne Ewijk	(India) Kyra Shroff (India) Dhruthi Tatachar Venugopal	6–3, 6–3
Win	15–8	Jul 2016	ITF Don Benito, Spain	10,000	Hard	(Netherlands) Chayenne Ewijk	(Spain) Arabela Fernández Rabener (Russia) Yana Sizikova	7–5, 6–2
Loss	15–9	Jul 2016	ITF Savitaipale, Finland	10,000	Hard	(Netherlands) Chayenne Ewijk	(Russia) Kseniia Bekker (Italy) Georgia Brescia	6–4, 4–6, [5–10]
Loss	15–10	Aug 2016	ITF Rotterdam, Netherlands	10,000	Clay	(Belarus) Sviatlana Pirazhenka	(Denmark) Karen Barritza (United States) Chiara Scholl	2–6, 3–6
Loss	15–11	Sep 2016	ITF Alphen a/d Rijn, Netherlands	10,000	Clay	(Netherlands) Chayenne Ewijk	(Netherlands) Nina Kruijer (Netherlands) Suzan Lamens	0–6, 6–3, [5–10]
Win	16–11	Sep 2016	ITF Pétange, Luxembourg	10,000	Hard (i)	(Netherlands) Chayenne Ewijk	(Poland) Justyna Jegiołka (Belgium) Magali Kempen	7–6^{(6)}, 6–3
Win	17–11	Oct 2016	Lagos Open, Nigeria	25,000	Hard	(Netherlands) Chayenne Ewijk	(Greece) Valentini Grammatikopoulou (India) Prarthana Thombare	6–3, 7–5
Win	18–11	Nov 2016	ITF Oslo, Norway	10,000	Hard (i)	(Netherlands) Chayenne Ewijk	(Denmark) Karen Barritza (Slovakia) Michaela Hončová	6–4, 6–4
Loss	18–12	Jan 2017	ITF Saint Martin, Guadeloupe	15,000	Hard	(Netherlands) Chayenne Ewijk	(United States) Desirae Krawczyk (Mexico) Giuliana Olmos	1–6, 1–6
Loss	18–13	Apr 2017	Chiasso Open, Switzerland	25,000	Clay	(Czech Republic) Kateřina Kramperová	(North Macedonia) Lina Gjorcheska (Bulgaria) Aleksandrina Naydenova	5–7, 6–2, [7–10]
Win	19–13	Jun 2017	ITF Alkmaar, Netherlands	15,000	Clay	(Australia) Sally Peers	(Belarus) Sviatlana Pirazhenka (Netherlands) Erika Vogelsang	6–3, 6–1
Win	20–13	Jul 2017	ITF Amstelveen, Netherlands	15,000	Clay	(United States) Dasha Ivanova	(United Kingdom) Emily Arbuthnott (Australia) Belinda Woolcock	6–4, 6–4
Win	21–13	Jul 2017	ITF Dublin, Ireland	15,000	Carpet	(Italy) Giorgia Marchetti	(United Kingdom) Emily Appleton (United States) Quinn Gleason	7–5, 6–4
Win	22–13	Nov 2017	ITF Pétange, Luxembourg	15,000	Hard (i)	(Netherlands) Chayenne Ewijk	(France) Priscilla Heise (Belgium) Déborah Kerfs	6–2, 4–6, [10–8]
Loss	22–14	Nov 2017	ITF Dakar, Senegal	25,000	Hard	(Greece) Valentini Grammatikopoulou	(Russia) Yana Sizikova (Montenegro) Ana Veselinović	3–6, 3–6
Win	23–14	Mar 2018	ITF Bhopal, India	15,000	Hard	(India) Kanika Vaidya	(Slovakia) Tereza Mihalíková (Montenegro) Ana Veselinović	1–2 ret.
Loss	23–15	Apr 2018	Chiasso Open, Switzerland	25,000	Clay	(Netherlands) Cindy Burger	(Croatia) Darija Jurak (Australia) Jessica Moore	6–7^{(6)}, 6–4, [8–10]
Win	24–15	Apr 2018	ITF Pula, Italy	25,000	Clay	(Australia) Naiktha Bains	(Russia) Victoria Kan (Russia) Maria Zotova	6–2, 6–2
Win	25–15	Oct 2018	Lagos Open, Nigeria	25,000	Hard	(Bulgaria) Julia Terziyska	(Netherlands) Merel Hoedt (Netherlands) Noa Liauw a Fong	6–4, 6–4
Loss	25–16	Jan 2019	ITF Petit-Bourg, France	W25	Hard	(Montenegro) Vladica Babić	(United States) Quinn Gleason (Brazil) Luisa Stefani	5–7, 3–6
Win	26–16	Feb 2019	AK Ladies Open, Germany	W25	Carpet (i)	(Spain) Cristina Bucșa	(Belgium) Marie Benoît (Poland) Katarzyna Piter	5–7, 6–3, [12–10]
Win	27–16	Apr 2019	Lale Cup Istanbul, Turkey	W60	Hard	(Czech Republic) Marie Bouzková	(Belarus) Ilona Kremen (Belarus) Iryna Shymanovich	7–5, 6–7^{(2)}, [10–5]
Loss	27–17	Oct 2019	Suzhou Ladies Open, China	W100	Hard	(India) Ankita Raina	(China) Jiang Xinyu (China) Tang Qianhui	6–3, 3–6, [5–10]
Loss	27–18	Nov 2019	Liuzhou Open, China	W60	Hard	(India) Ankita Raina	(China) Jiang Xinyu (China) Tang Qianhui	4–6, 4–6
Win	28–18	Jan 2020	ITF Malibu, United States	W25	Hard	(Brazil) Laura Pigossi	(Norway) Astrid Brune Olsen (Peru) Anastasia Iamachkine	6–4, 7–6^{(4)}
Win	29–18	Jan 2020	ITF Petit-Bourg, France	W25	Hard	(Brazil) Laura Pigossi	(France) Mylène Halemai (France) Manon Léonard	6–2, 6–1
Win	30–18	Jun 2022	Surbiton Trophy, United Kingdom	W100	Grass	(United States) Ingrid Neel	(Mexico) Fernanda Contreras (United States) Catherine Harrison	6–3, 6–3
Loss	30–19	Jul 2022	Reinert Open, Germany	W100	Clay	(India) Ankita Raina	(Kazakhstan) Anna Danilina (Netherlands) Arianne Hartono	7–6^{(4)}, 4–6, [6–10]
Loss	30–20	Oct 2022	ITF Cherbourg-en-Cotentin, France	W25	Hard (i)	(India) Ankita Raina	(Spain) Irene Burillo (Spain) Andrea Lázaro García	3–6, 4–6
Loss	30–21	Nov 2022	ITF Pétange, Luxembourg	W25	Hard (i)	(Netherlands) Bibiane Schoofs	(Belgium) Magali Kempen (Switzerland) Xenia Knoll	0–6, 4–6

== ITF Junior finals ==
Legend
Category G1
Category G2
Category G3
Category G4
Category G5

=== Singles (0–1) ===
Result	Date	Tournament	Surface	Opponent	Score
Loss	Jul 2010	Hillegom, Netherlands	Clay	(France) Jade Suvrijn	1–6, 1–6

=== Doubles (5–6) ===
Result	W–L	Date	Tournament	Surface	Partnering	Opponents	Score
Win	1–0	Jan 2009	Västerås, Sweden	Hard (i)	(Belgium) Ysaline Bonaventure	(Denmark) Mai Grage (Egypt) Katharina Holert	6–3, 4–6, [10–6]
Win	2–0	Jun 2009	Astana, Kazakhstan	Hard	(Turkey) Başak Eraydın	(United States) Marica McCoy (India) Adnya Naik	6–4, 6–2
Loss	2–1	Jun 2009	Almaty, Kazakhstan	Hard	(Turkey) Başak Eraydın	(Kazakhstan) Kamila Rafkat (Russia) Yuliana Vorobeva	6–2, 2–6, [9–11]
Loss	2–2	Aug 2009	Vila do Conde, Portugal	Carpet	(Czech Republic) Alena Poletinová	(Russia) Olga Doroshina (Brazil) Carla Forte	6–7^{(2)}, 4–6
Loss	2–3	Aug 2010	Vila do Conde, Portugal	Carpet	(Croatia) Katja Milaš	(Russia) Yana Sizikova (Russia) Ekaterina Nikitina	4–6, 2–6
Win	3–3	Aug 2010	Clermont-Ferrand, France	Clay	(Sweden) Malin Ulvefeldt	(Finland) Ella Leivo (Finland) Annika Sillanpää	6–4, 2–6, [13–11]
Loss	3–4	Aug 2010	Den Haag, Netherlands	Clay	(Estonia) Eva Paalma	(Hungary) Lilla Barzó (Croatia) Jana Fett	3–6, 5–7
Win	4–4	Aug 2011	Clermont-Ferrand, France	Clay	(Switzerland) Maëlle Kocher	(United Kingdom) Sarah Beth Grey (United Kingdom) Brigit Folland	w/o
Win	5–4	Oct 2011	Perak, Malaysia	Hard	(India) Parminder Kaur	(United Kingdom) Sarah Beth Grey (United Kingdom) Pippa Horn	7–5, 3–6, [10–6]
Loss	5–5	Jan 2012	San José, Costa Rica	Hard	(United States) Sachia Vickery	(Brazil) Laura Pigossi (Mexico) Marcela Zacarías	2–6, 4–6
Loss	5–6	Apr 2012	Istres, France	Clay	(Ukraine) Marianna Zakarlyuk	(France) Estelle Cascino (Russia) Daria Salnikova	1–6, 4–6
