= 2024 Ando Securities Open =

Tennis tournament

- Date: 22–28 April 2024
- Edition: 7th
- Category: ITF Women's World Tennis Tour
- Prize money: $100,000
- Surface: Hard / Outdoor
- Location: Tokyo, Japan

Champions

Singles
- (Australia) Maddison Inglis

Doubles
- (Australia) Kimberly Birrell / (South Korea) Jang Su-jeong
- Ando Securities Open

The 2024 Ando Securities Open was a professional tennis tournament played on outdoor hard courts. It was the seventh edition of the tournament, which was part of the 2024 ITF Women's World Tennis Tour. It took place in Tokyo, Japan, between 22 and 28 April 2024.

== Champions ==
=== Singles ===
- (Australia) Maddison Inglis def. (Japan) Ena Shibahara, 6–4, 3–6, 6–2

=== Doubles ===
- (Australia) Kimberly Birrell / (South Korea) Jang Su-jeong def. (Serbia) Aleksandra Krunić / (Australia) Arina Rodionova, 7–5, 3–6, [10–8]

== Singles main draw entrants ==
=== Seeds ===
Country	Player	Rank	Seed
USA	Emina Bektas	99	1
AUS	Arina Rodionova	103	2
JPN	Mai Hontama	119	3
JPN	Moyuka Uchijima	126	4
GBR	Lily Miyazaki	140	5
NED	Arianne Hartono	141	6
	Valeria Savinykh	156	7
CAN	Rebecca Marino	161	8

- Rankings are as of 15 April 2024.

=== Other entrants ===
The following players received wildcards into the singles main draw:

- (Japan) Sayaka Ishii
- (Japan) Ena Koike
- (Japan) Kayo Nishimura
- (Japan) Ena Shibahara

The following players received entry from the qualifying draw:

- (Hong Kong) Eudice Chong
- (United States) Dalayna Hewitt
- (Serbia) Aleksandra Krunić
- (Thailand) Luksika Kumkhum
- (Japan) Moeka Miyata
- (Japan) Kyōka Okamura
- (Japan) Naho Sato
- (Japan) Erika Sema
