= 2024 Wimbledon Championships – Women's doubles =

Women's doubles
- 2024 Wimbledon Championships

Final
- Champions: (Czech Republic) Kateřina Siniaková (United States) Taylor Townsend
- Runners-up: (Canada) Gabriela Dabrowski (New Zealand) Erin Routliffe
- Score: 7–6^{(7–5)}, 7–6^{(7–1)}

Events
Singles	men	women		boys	girls
Doubles	men	women	mixed	boys	girls
WC Singles	men	women	quad
WC Doubles	men	women	quad
Legends	men	women	mixed
14&U Singles	boys	girls
← 2023 ·	Wimbledon Championships	· 2025 →

Kateřina Siniaková and Taylor Townsend defeated Gabriela Dabrowski and Erin Routliffe in the final, 7–6^{(7–5)}, 7–6^{(7–1)} to win the ladies' doubles tennis title at the 2024 Wimbledon Championships. It was the first major women's doubles title for Townsend and ninth for Siniaková, the latter of whom completed the Channel Slam (having won the French Open partnering Coco Gauff).

Hsieh Su-wei and Barbora Strýcová were the reigning champions, but Strýcová retired from the sport after the 2023 US Open. Hsieh partnered with Elise Mertens, but lost in the semifinals to Siniaková and Townsend. The defeat ended Hsieh's 22-match winning streak at the tournament.

By reaching the final, Routliffe attained the WTA No. 1 doubles ranking at the end of the tournament. Routliffe became the first player from New Zealand, male or female, to be world No. 1 in either singles or doubles. Mertens, Siniaková, and Laura Siegemund were also in contention for the No. 1 ranking at the beginning of the tournament.

Bethanie Mattek-Sands was vying for a career Grand Slam, but lost in the third round to Hsieh and Mertens.

== Seeds ==
1. (Chinese Taipei) Hsieh Su-wei / (Belgium) Elise Mertens (semifinals)
2. (Canada) Gabriela Dabrowski / (New Zealand) Erin Routliffe (final)
3. (United States) Nicole Melichar-Martinez / (Australia) Ellen Perez (second round)
4. (Czech Republic) Kateřina Siniaková / (United States) Taylor Townsend (champions)
5. (Italy) Sara Errani / (Italy) Jasmine Paolini (third round)
6. (Netherlands) Demi Schuurs / (Brazil) Luisa Stefani (first round)
7. (United States) Caroline Dolehide / (United States) Desirae Krawczyk (semifinals)
8. (Czech Republic) Barbora Krejčíková / (Germany) Laura Siegemund (quarterfinals)
9. (Ukraine) Lyudmyla Kichenok / (Latvia) Jeļena Ostapenko (quarterfinals)
10. (Czech Republic) Marie Bouzková / (Spain) Sara Sorribes Tormo (second round)
11. (United States) Coco Gauff / (United States) Jessica Pegula (quarterfinals)
12. (Chinese Taipei) Chan Hao-ching / Veronika Kudermetova (third round)
13. (Mexico) Giuliana Olmos / Alexandra Panova (first round)
14. (United States) Sofia Kenin / (United States) Bethanie Mattek-Sands (third round)
15. (United States) Asia Muhammad / (Indonesia) Aldila Sutjiadi (third round)
16. (Norway) Ulrikke Eikeri / (Estonia) Ingrid Neel (second round)

Click on the seed number of a player to go to their draw section.

== Draw ==
=== Key ===
- Q = Qualifier
- WC = Wild card
- LL = Lucky loser
- Alt = Alternate
- ITF = ITF entry
- PR = Protected ranking
- SR = Special ranking
- SE = Special exempt
- JE = Junior exempt
- JR = Junior Accelerator Programme entrant
- CO = College Accelerator Programme entrant
- NG = Next Gen Accelerator Program entrant
- w/o = Walkover
- r = Retired
- d = Defaulted

=== Finals ===
Quarterfinals
1	(Chinese Taipei) Hsieh Su-wei (Belgium) Elise Mertens	6	6
11	(United States) Coco Gauff (United States) Jessica Pegula	2	1
4	(Czech Republic) Kateřina Siniaková (United States) Taylor Townsend	6	6
9	(Ukraine) Lyudmyla Kichenok (Latvia) Jeļena Ostapenko	1	3
7	(United States) Caroline Dolehide (United States) Desirae Krawczyk	1	6	6
(Hungary) Tímea Babos (Ukraine) Nadiia Kichenok	6	2	0
8	(Czech Republic) Barbora Krejčíková (Germany) Laura Siegemund	4	7^{7}	4
2	(Canada) Gabriela Dabrowski (New Zealand) Erin Routliffe	6	6^{5}	6

Semifinals
1	(Chinese Taipei) Hsieh Su-wei (Belgium) Elise Mertens	6	4	4
4	(Czech Republic) Kateřina Siniaková (United States) Taylor Townsend	3	6	6
7	(United States) Caroline Dolehide (United States) Desirae Krawczyk	4	3
2	(Canada) Gabriela Dabrowski (New Zealand) Erin Routliffe	6	6

Final
4	(Czech Republic) Kateřina Siniaková (United States) Taylor Townsend	7^{7}	7^{7}
2	(Canada) Gabriela Dabrowski (New Zealand) Erin Routliffe	6^{5}	6^{1}

=== Top half ===
==== Section 1 ====
First round
1	(Chinese Taipei) S-w Hsieh (Belgium) E Mertens	6	6
WC	(United Kingdom) A Barnett (United Kingdom) F Christie	0	3
(China) Xiy Wang (China) L Zhu	6	2	6^{9}
WC	(United Kingdom) E Appleton (United Kingdom) L Miyazaki	3	6	7^{11}
PR	(Japan) M Kato (China) S Zhang	6	7^{7}
(Italy) A Moratelli (Argentina) N Podoroska	2	6^{2}
(Belgium) G Minnen (United Kingdom) H Watson	3	4
14	(United States) S Kenin (United States) B Mattek-Sands	6	6
11	(United States) C Gauff (United States) J Pegula	7	6^{7}	7
(Ukraine) A Kalinina (Ukraine) D Yastremska	5	7^{9}	5
(Poland) M Fręch (Poland) K Kawa	4	6	6^{6}
(Kazakhstan) A Danilina (China) Y Xu	6	4	7^{10}
Alt	(Czech Republic) M Kolodziejová (Czech Republic) A Sisková	6	6
Alt	(United States) L Davis (Belgium) K Zimmermann	2	0
WC	(United Kingdom) H Dart (United Kingdom) M Lumsden	3	6	3
5	(Italy) S Errani (Italy) J Paolini	6	3	6

Second round
1	(Chinese Taipei) S-w Hsieh (Belgium) E Mertens	6	6
WC	(United Kingdom) E Appleton (United Kingdom) L Miyazaki	1	2
PR	(Japan) M Kato (China) S Zhang	1	4
14	(United States) S Kenin (United States) B Mattek-Sands	6	6
11	(United States) C Gauff (United States) J Pegula	6	7^{7}
(Kazakhstan) A Danilina (China) Y Xu	2	6^{3}
Alt	(Czech Republic) M Kolodziejová (Czech Republic) A Sisková	1	4
5	(Italy) S Errani (Italy) J Paolini	6	6

Third round
1	(Chinese Taipei) S-w Hsieh (Belgium) E Mertens	6	3	6
14	(United States) S Kenin (United States) B Mattek-Sands	4	6	1
11	(United States) C Gauff (United States) J Pegula	6	6
5	(Italy) S Errani (Italy) J Paolini	2	4

Quarterfinals
1	(Chinese Taipei) S-w Hsieh (Belgium) E Mertens	6	6
11	(United States) C Gauff (United States) J Pegula	2	1

==== Section 2 ====
First round
4	(Czech Republic) K Siniaková (United States) T Townsend	6	7^{7}
(Spain) R Masarova (Czech Republic) L Nosková	3	6^{5}
(Poland) K Piter (Bulgaria) V Tomova	4	3
Alt	(Australia) O Gadecki (France) E Lechemia	6	6
(China) H Guo (China) X Jiang	6	6^{4}	3
(Canada) L Fernandez (Japan) E Shibahara	2	7^{7}	6
(Italy) C Rosatello; L Samsonova	3	7^{7}	3
16	(Norway) U Eikeri (Estonia) I Neel	6	6^{2}	6
9	(Ukraine) L Kichenok (Latvia) J Ostapenko	6	6
(Australia) D Saville (China) Y Yuan	1	4
A Blinkova (Egypt) M Sherif	6	6
(Japan) E Hozumi (Japan) M Uchijima	4	1
(Poland) M Linette (United States) P Stearns	6	7^{8}
(Romania) A Bogdan (Romania) J Cristian	4	6^{6}
(Slovakia) T Mihalíková (United Kingdom) O Nicholls	6	6
6	(Netherlands) D Schuurs (Brazil) L Stefani	4	0

Second round
4	(Czech Republic) K Siniaková (United States) T Townsend	6	2	6
Alt	(Australia) O Gadecki (France) E Lechemia	4	6	1
(Canada) L Fernandez (Japan) E Shibahara	2	7	6
16	(Norway) U Eikeri (Estonia) I Neel	6	5	2
9	(Ukraine) L Kichenok (Latvia) J Ostapenko	w/o
A Blinkova (Egypt) M Sherif
(Poland) M Linette (United States) P Stearns	2	0
(Slovakia) T Mihalíková (United Kingdom) O Nicholls	6	6

Third round
4	(Czech Republic) K Siniaková (United States) T Townsend	6	7^{7}
(Canada) L Fernandez (Japan) E Shibahara	2	6^{3}
9	(Ukraine) L Kichenok (Latvia) J Ostapenko	3	6	6
(Slovakia) T Mihalíková (United Kingdom) O Nicholls	6	2	3

Quarterfinals
4	(Czech Republic) K Siniaková (United States) T Townsend	6	6
9	(Ukraine) L Kichenok (Latvia) J Ostapenko	1	3

=== Bottom half ===
==== Section 3 ====
First round
7	(United States) C Dolehide (United States) D Krawczyk	7	6
(Japan) S Aoyama (Serbia) A Krunić	5	2
(United States) E Navarro (France) D Parry	4	6	6
(Italy) L Bronzetti (France) V Gracheva	6	1	4
PR	(China) Xin Wang (China) S Zheng	2	4
(France) C Garcia (France) K Mladenovic	6	6
E Avanesyan (Georgia (country)) O Kalashnikova	3	7^{7}	2
10	(Czech Republic) M Bouzková (Spain) S Sorribes Tormo	6	6^{1}	6
15	(United States) A Muhammad (Indonesia) A Sutjiadi	7^{8}	6
PR	(Romania) I-C Begu (Italy) M Trevisan	6^{6}	3
PR	D Shnaider; E Vesnina	4	7^{8}	6
(Kazakhstan) Y Putintseva (Denmark) C Tauson	6	6^{6}	0
WC	(United Kingdom) N Bains (United Kingdom) A Rajecki	4	4
(Hungary) T Babos (Ukraine) N Kichenok	6	6
WC	(United Kingdom) SB Grey (United Kingdom) T Moore	1	2
3	(United States) N Melichar-Martinez (Australia) E Perez	6	6

Second round
7	(United States) C Dolehide (United States) D Krawczyk	6	6
(United States) E Navarro (France) D Parry	2	3
(France) C Garcia (France) K Mladenovic	6	6
10	(Czech Republic) M Bouzková (Spain) S Sorribes Tormo	3	4
15	(United States) A Muhammad (Indonesia) A Sutjiadi	6	3	6
PR	D Shnaider; E Vesnina	2	6	3
(Hungary) T Babos (Ukraine) N Kichenok	4	6	6
3	(United States) N Melichar-Martinez (Australia) E Perez	6	2	2

Third round
7	(United States) C Dolehide (United States) D Krawczyk	6	6
(France) C Garcia (France) K Mladenovic	2	1
15	(United States) A Muhammad (Indonesia) A Sutjiadi	5	3
(Hungary) T Babos (Ukraine) N Kichenok	7	6

Quarterfinals
7	(United States) C Dolehide (United States) D Krawczyk	1	6	6
(Hungary) T Babos (Ukraine) N Kichenok	6	2	0

==== Section 4 ====
First round
8	(Czech Republic) B Krejčíková (Germany) L Siegemund	7^{7}	6
WC	(United Kingdom) S Murray Sharan (United Kingdom) E Silva	6^{1}	4
(United States) H Baptiste (United States) A Parks	6	6
(Japan) M Ninomiya (Chinese Taipei) F-h Wu	3	2
(Spain) C Bucșa (Japan) N Hibino	6	6
(Germany) T Maria (Netherlands) A Rus	2	4
(United States) A Krueger (United States) S Stephens	4	6	5
12	(Chinese Taipei) H-c Chan; V Kudermetova	6	3	7
13	(Mexico) G Olmos; A Panova	6	3	0
(Ukraine) M Kostyuk (Romania) E-G Ruse	2	6	6
Y Sizikova (China) Y Wang	6	7
Alt	(Germany) T Korpatsch (Netherlands) B Schoofs	3	5
(Brazil) B Haddad Maia (Brazil) I Martins	5	3
I Khromacheva; K Rakhimova	7	6
M Andreeva; A Potapova	2	5
2	(Canada) G Dabrowski (New Zealand) E Routliffe	6	7

Second round
8	(Czech Republic) B Krejčíková (Germany) L Siegemund	6	6
(United States) H Baptiste (United States) A Parks	3	3
(Spain) C Bucșa (Japan) N Hibino	2	5
12	(Chinese Taipei) H-c Chan; V Kudermetova	6	7
(Ukraine) M Kostyuk (Romania) E-G Ruse	6	6
Y Sizikova (China) Y Wang	4	4
I Khromacheva; K Rakhimova	6^{4}	6	5
2	(Canada) G Dabrowski (New Zealand) E Routliffe	7^{7}	3	7

Third round
8	(Czech Republic) B Krejčíková (Germany) L Siegemund	6	6
12	(Chinese Taipei) H-c Chan; V Kudermetova	1	2
(Ukraine) M Kostyuk (Romania) E-G Ruse	3	1
2	(Canada) G Dabrowski (New Zealand) E Routliffe	6	6

Quarterfinals
8	(Czech Republic) B Krejčíková (Germany) L Siegemund	4	7^{7}	4
2	(Canada) G Dabrowski (New Zealand) E Routliffe	6	6^{5}	6

== Seeded teams ==
The following are the seeded teams. Seedings are based on WTA rankings as of 24 June 2024.

Country	Player	Country	Player	Rank	Seed
TPE	Hsieh Su-wei	BEL	Elise Mertens	3	1
CAN	Gabriela Dabrowski	NZL	Erin Routliffe	7	2
USA	Nicole Melichar-Martinez	AUS	Ellen Perez	18	3
CZE	Kateřina Siniaková	USA	Taylor Townsend	28	4
ITA	Sara Errani	ITA	Jasmine Paolini	29	5
NED	Demi Schuurs	BRA	Luisa Stefani	29	6
USA	Caroline Dolehide	USA	Desirae Krawczyk	30	7
CZE	Barbora Krejčiková	GER	Laura Siegemund	32	8
UKR	Lyudmyla Kichenok	LAT	Jeļena Ostapenko	37	9
CZE	Marie Bouzková	ESP	Sara Sorribes Tormo	43	10
USA	Coco Gauff	USA	Jessica Pegula	55	11
TPE	Chan Hao-ching		Veronika Kudermetova	62	12
MEX	Giuliana Olmos		Alexandra Panova	66	13
USA	Sofia Kenin	USA	Bethanie Mattek-Sands	67	14
USA	Asia Muhammad	INA	Aldila Sutjiadi	67	15
NOR	Ulrikke Eikeri	EST	Ingrid Neel	73	16

== Other entry information ==
=== Wildcards ===
- (United Kingdom) Emily Appleton / (United Kingdom) Lily Miyazaki
- (United Kingdom) Naiktha Bains / (United Kingdom) Amelia Rajecki
- (United Kingdom) Alicia Barnett / (United Kingdom) Freya Christie
- (United Kingdom) Harriet Dart / (United Kingdom) Maia Lumsden
- (United Kingdom) Sarah Beth Grey / (United Kingdom) Tara Moore
- (United Kingdom) Samantha Murray Sharan / (United Kingdom) Eden Silva

=== Protected ranking ===
- (Romania) Irina-Camelia Begu / (Italy) Martina Trevisan
- (Japan) Miyu Kato / (China) Zhang Shuai
- Diana Shnaider / Elena Vesnina
- (China) Wang Xinyu / (China) Zheng Saisai

=== Alternates ===
- (United States) Lauren Davis / (Belgium) Kimberley Zimmermann
- (Australia) Olivia Gadecki / (France) Elixane Lechemia
- (Czech Republic) Miriam Kolodziejová / (Czech Republic) Anna Sisková
- (Germany) Tamara Korpatsch / (Netherlands) Bibiane Schoofs

=== Withdrawals ===
- Ekaterina Alexandrova / Anastasia Pavlyuchenkova → replaced by (United States) Lauren Davis / (Belgium) Kimberley Zimmermann
- Victoria Azarenka / (Spain) Paula Badosa → replaced by (Czech Republic) Miriam Kolodziejová / (Czech Republic) Anna Sisková
- (Spain) Cristina Bucșa / (Romania) Monica Niculescu → replaced by (Spain) Cristina Bucșa / (Japan) Nao Hibino
- (France) Clara Burel / (Colombia) Camila Osorio → replaced by (Australia) Olivia Gadecki / (France) Elixane Lechemia
- Anna Kalinskaya / (Croatia) Donna Vekić → replaced by (Germany) Tamara Korpatsch / (Netherlands) Bibiane Schoofs
