= 2022 WTA Lyon Open – Doubles =

Doubles
- 2022 WTA Lyon Open

Final
- Champions: (Germany) Laura Siegemund; Vera Zvonareva
- Runners-up: (United Kingdom) Alicia Barnett (United Kingdom) Olivia Nicholls
- Score: 7–5, 6–1

Events
Singles	Doubles
- WTA Lyon Open

Laura Siegemund and Vera Zvonareva defeated Alicia Barnett and Olivia Nicholls in the final, 7–5, 6–1 to win the doubles tennis title at the 2022 WTA Lyon Open.

Viktória Kužmová and Arantxa Rus were the reigning champions, but Kužmová did not participate. Rus partnered Greet Minnen, but withdrew from the tournament before their first-round match.

== Seeds ==
1. (Japan) Eri Hozumi / (Japan) Makoto Ninomiya (quarterfinals)
2. (Chinese Taipei) Chan Hao-ching / (Germany) Julia Lohoff (quarterfinals)
3. (Romania) Irina Bara / (Georgia (country)) Ekaterine Gorgodze (first round)
4. (Romania) Monica Niculescu / Alexandra Panova (semifinals)

== Draw ==
Key

- Q = Qualifier
- WC = Wild card
- LL = Lucky loser
- Alt = Alternate
- ITF = ITF entry
- PR = Protected ranking
- SR = Special ranking
- SE = Special exempt
- JE = Junior exempt
- JR = Junior Accelerator Programme entrant
- CO = College Accelerator Programme entrant
- NG = Next Gen Accelerator Program entrant
- w/o = Walkover
- r = Retired
- d = Defaulted

=== Draw ===
First round
1	(Japan) E Hozumi (Japan) M Ninomiya	7	4	[15]
A Anshba (Greece) V Grammatikopoulou	5	6	[13]
(Norway) U Eikeri (United Kingdom) S Murray Sharan	6	6
(France) E Cascino (France) J Ponchet	4	2
3	(Romania) I Bara (Georgia (country)) E Gorgodze	3	4
(United Kingdom) A Barnett (United Kingdom) O Nicholls	6	6
(Germany) A-L Friedsam (Germany) N Geuer	6	6
(Georgia (country)) O Kalashnikova (Romania) A Mitu	3	2
WC	(Ukraine) D Yastremska (Ukraine) I Yastremska	2	4
(Spain) G García Pérez (Switzerland) X Knoll	6	6
WC	(France) E Jacquemot (Germany) T Maria	6	5	[7]
4	(Romania) M Niculescu; A Panova	2	7	[10]
(Belgium) G Minnen (Netherlands) A Rus
(Germany) L Siegemund; V Zvonareva	w/o
(United Kingdom) E Silva (Belgium) K Zimmermann	7	1	[2]
2	(Chinese Taipei) H-c Chan (Germany) J Lohoff	5	6	[10]

Quarterfinals
1	(Japan) E Hozumi (Japan) M Ninomiya	7	5	[5]
(Norway) U Eikeri (United Kingdom) S Murray Sharan	5	7	[10]
(United Kingdom) A Barnett (United Kingdom) O Nicholls	6	6
(Germany) A-L Friedsam (Germany) N Geuer	0	4
(Spain) G García Pérez (Switzerland) X Knoll	6^{1}	6^{7}
4	(Romania) M Niculescu; A Panova	7^{7}	7^{9}
(Germany) L Siegemund; V Zvonareva	7^{7}	7^{7}
2	(Chinese Taipei) H-c Chan (Germany) J Lohoff	6^{1}	6^{5}

Semifinals
(Norway) U Eikeri (United Kingdom) S Murray Sharan	6	6^{5}	[3]
(United Kingdom) A Barnett (United Kingdom) O Nicholls	0	7^{7}	[10]
4	(Romania) M Niculescu; A Panova	6	5	[10]
(Germany) L Siegemund; V Zvonareva	4	7	[12]

Final
(United Kingdom) A Barnett (United Kingdom) O Nicholls	5	1
(Germany) L Siegemund; V Zvonareva	7	6
