= 2022 WTA Lyon Open – Singles =

Singles
- 2022 WTA Lyon Open

Final
- Champion: (China) Zhang Shuai
- Runner-up: (Ukraine) Dayana Yastremska
- Score: 3–6, 6–3, 6–4

Details
- Draw: 32
- Seeds: 8

Events
Singles	Doubles
- WTA Lyon Open

Zhang Shuai defeated wildcard Dayana Yastremska in the final, 3–6, 6–3, 6–4 to win the Singles title at the 2022 WTA Lyon Open. It was her first title since 2017. Yastremska was participating in her first event since fleeing her native country of Ukraine due to the 2022 Russian invasion of Ukraine.

Clara Tauson was the defending champion, but chose not to participate.

== Seeds ==
1. (Italy) Camila Giorgi (first round)
2. (Romania) Sorana Cîrstea (semifinals)
3. (Switzerland) Viktorija Golubic (second round)
4. (France) Alizé Cornet (first round)
5. (Italy) Jasmine Paolini (quarterfinals)
6. (Croatia) Ana Konjuh (first round)
7. (Belgium) Alison Van Uytvanck (quarterfinals)
8. (China) Zhang Shuai (champion)

== Draw ==
Key

- Q = Qualifier
- WC = Wild card
- LL = Lucky loser
- Alt = Alternate
- ITF = ITF entry
- PR = Protected ranking
- SR = Special ranking
- SE = Special exempt
- JE = Junior exempt
- JR = Junior Accelerator Programme entrant
- CO = College Accelerator Programme entrant
- NG = Next Gen Accelerator Program entrant
- w/o = Walkover
- r = Retired
- d = Defaulted

=== Finals ===
Semifinals
(France) Caroline Garcia	2	5
8	(China) Zhang Shuai	6	7
WC	(Ukraine) Dayana Yastremska	7^{7}	4	6
2	(Romania) Sorana Cîrstea	6^{5}	6	4

Final
8	(China) Zhang Shuai	3	6	6
WC	(Ukraine) Dayana Yastremska	6	3	4

=== Top half ===
First round
1	(Italy) C Giorgi	7	4	0
(France) C Garcia	5	6	6
PR	(Italy) E Cocciaretto	3	2
(Italy) M Trevisan	6	6
V Gracheva	7^{7}	7^{7}
(Slovakia) K Kučová	6^{0}	6^{2}
WC	V Zvonareva	0	3
7	(Belgium) A Van Uytvanck	6	6
3	(Switzerland) V Golubic	1	6	6
LL	(Japan) M Hontama	6	4	4
(Germany) A-L Friedsam	3	6	4
PR	V Diatchenko	6	2	6
(Montenegro) D Kovinić	2	0
(Netherlands) A Rus	6	6
(France) K Mladenovic	6^{3}	5
8	(China) S Zhang	7^{7}	7

Second round
(France) C Garcia	6	2	6
(Italy) M Trevisan	4	6	3
V Gracheva	2	4
7	(Belgium) A Van Uytvanck	6	6
3	(Switzerland) V Golubic	6^{4}	6	4
PR	V Diatchenko	7^{7}	4	6
(Netherlands) A Rus	4	4
8	(China) S Zhang	6	6

Quarterfinals
(France) C Garcia	4	6	7
7	(Belgium) A Van Uytvanck	6	3	5
PR	V Diatchenko	0^{r}
8	(China) S Zhang	3

Semifinals
(France) C Garcia	2	5
8	(China) S Zhang	6	7

=== Bottom half ===
First round
5	(Italy) J Paolini	4	7	6
(Romania) I Bara	6	5	3
Q	(Germany) T Korpatsch	6	1	6
(France) O Dodin	3	6	2
WC	(Ukraine) D Yastremska	3	7^{9}	7^{9}
(Romania) A Bogdan	6	6^{7}	6^{7}
Q	(Spain) C Bucșa	1	6	6
4	(France) A Cornet	6	4	1
6	(Croatia) A Konjuh	7	0	3
Q	(United Kingdom) K Boulter	5	6	6
(Hungary) A Bondár	6^{5}	6	7
Q	(Japan) Y Miyazaki	7^{7}	3	5
Q	(Switzerland) S Vögele	4	6	6
WC	(France) E Jacquemot	6	2	3
Q	(Georgia (country)) M Bolkvadze	3	1
2	(Romania) S Cîrstea	6	6

Second round
5	(Italy) J Paolini	6	6
Q	(Germany) T Korpatsch	1	2
WC	(Ukraine) D Yastremska	6	6
Q	(Spain) C Bucșa	2	3
Q	(United Kingdom) K Boulter	3	0^{r}
(Hungary) A Bondár	6	0
Q	(Switzerland) S Vögele	3	5
2	(Romania) S Cîrstea	6	7

Quarterfinals
5	(Italy) J Paolini	4	6^{3}
WC	(Ukraine) D Yastremska	6	7^{7}
(Hungary) A Bondár	3	3
2	(Romania) S Cîrstea	6	6

Semifinals
WC	(Ukraine) D Yastremska	7^{7}	4	6
2	(Romania) S Cîrstea	6^{5}	6	4

== Qualifying ==
=== Seeds ===
1. (Georgia (country)) Ekaterine Gorgodze (qualifying competition)
2. (Japan) Mai Hontama (qualifying competition, lucky loser)
3. (United Kingdom) Katie Boulter (qualified)
4. (Spain) Cristina Bucșa (qualified)
5. (Netherlands) Lesley Pattinama Kerkhove (qualifying competition)
6. Anna Blinkova (first round, retired)
7. (Switzerland) Ylena In-Albon (qualifying competition)
8. (Austria) Julia Grabher (first round)
9. (Switzerland) Stefanie Vögele (qualified)
10. (Germany) Laura Siegemund (qualifying competition)
11. Anastasia Gasanova (first round)
12. (Georgia (country)) Mariam Bolkvadze (qualified)

=== Qualifiers ===
1. (Switzerland) Stefanie Vögele
2. (Georgia (country)) Mariam Bolkvadze
3. (United Kingdom) Katie Boulter
4. (Spain) Cristina Bucșa
5. (Japan) Yuriko Miyazaki
6. (Germany) Tamara Korpatsch

=== Lucky loser ===
1. (Japan) Mai Hontama

=== Qualifying draw ===
==== First qualifier ====
First round
1	(Georgia (country)) Ekaterine Gorgodze	7	6
(United Kingdom) Samantha Murray Sharan	5	1
(Spain) Georgina García Pérez	4	1
9	(Switzerland) Stefanie Vögele	6	6

Qualifying competition
1	(Georgia (country)) Ekaterine Gorgodze	3	5
9	(Switzerland) Stefanie Vögele	6	7

==== Second qualifier ====
First round
2	(Japan) Mai Hontama	6	4	6
(France) Jessika Ponchet	3	6	0
(Greece) Despina Papamichail	6	4	1
12	(Georgia (country)) Mariam Bolkvadze	3	6	6

Qualifying competition
2	(Japan) Mai Hontama	3	3
12	(Georgia (country)) Mariam Bolkvadze	6	6

==== Third qualifier ====
First round
3	(United Kingdom) Katie Boulter	6	6
WC	(France) Estelle Cascino	3	0
(Greece) Valentini Grammatikopoulou	1	4
10	(Germany) Laura Siegemund	6	6

Qualifying competition
3	(United Kingdom) Katie Boulter	6	6
10	(Germany) Laura Siegemund	4	4

==== Fourth qualifier ====
First round
4	(Spain) Cristina Bucșa	1	6	6
(Italy) Lucrezia Stefanini	6	2	1
WC	(Germany) Tatjana Maria	6	6
11	Anastasia Gasanova	4	1

Qualifying competition
4	(Spain) Cristina Bucșa	6	6
WC	(Germany) Tatjana Maria	3	2

==== Fifth qualifier ====
First round
5	(Netherlands) Lesley Pattinama Kerkhove	7	7
WC	(France) Nina Radovanovic	5	5
WC	(Japan) Yuriko Miyazaki	6	4	6
8	(Austria) Julia Grabher	4	6	4

Qualifying competition
5	(Netherlands) Lesley Pattinama Kerkhove	4	6^{4}
WC	(Japan) Yuriko Miyazaki	6	7^{7}

==== Sixth qualifier ====
First round
6	Anna Blinkova	4^{r}
(Germany) Tamara Korpatsch	5
(Switzerland) Susan Bandecchi	1	6	5
7	(Switzerland) Ylena In-Albon	6	4	7

Qualifying competition
(Germany) Tamara Korpatsch	7	6
7	(Switzerland) Ylena In-Albon	5	3
