= 2023 Ando Securities Open – Doubles =

Doubles
- 2023 Ando Securities Open

Final
- Champions: (France) Jessika Ponchet (Netherlands) Bibiane Schoofs
- Runners-up: (United Kingdom) Alicia Barnett (United Kingdom) Olivia Nicholls
- Score: 4–6, 6–1, [10–7]

Events
Singles	Doubles
← 2022 ·	Ando Securities Open	· 2024 →

Hsieh Yu-chieh and Jessy Rompies were the defending champions but Hsieh chose not to participate. Rompies partnered alongside Beatrice Gumulya, but they lost in the quarterfinals to Wang Xiyu and Yuan Yue.

Jessika Ponchet and Bibiane Schoofs won the title, defeating Alicia Barnett and Olivia Nicholls in the final, 4–6, 6–1, [10–7].

== Seeds ==
1. (Japan) Eri Hozumi / (Japan) Makoto Ninomiya (first round)
2. (United Kingdom) Alicia Barnett / (United Kingdom) Olivia Nicholls (final)
3. (Georgia (country)) Natela Dzalamidze / Sofya Lansere (quarterfinals)
4. (Japan) Mai Hontama / (Japan) Moyuka Uchijima (withdrew)

== Draw ==
=== Key ===
- Q = Qualifier
- WC = Wild card
- LL = Lucky loser
- Alt = Alternate
- SE = Special exempt
- PR = Protected ranking
- ITF = ITF entry
- JE = Junior exempt
- w/o = Walkover
- r = Retired
- d = Defaulted
- SR = Special ranking

=== Draw ===
First round
1	(Japan) E Hozumi (Japan) M Ninomiya	6	5	[8]
(China) Xiy Wang (China) Y Yuan	4	7	[10]
(Indonesia) B Gumulya (Indonesia) J Rompies	7^{7}	6
(Japan) H Arakawa (Japan) N Arakawa	6^{1}	4
Alt	(Japan) C Kanemaki (Japan) R Kikawada	2	0
(Hong Kong) E Chong (Hong Kong) C Wong	6	6
(France) J Ponchet (Netherlands) B Schoofs	6	7^{7}
(Japan) M Kobori (Chinese Taipei) E-s Liang	4	6^{5}
(Philippines) A Eala (Japan) N Kawaguchi	6	7^{7}
(Thailand) L Kumkhum (Thailand) P Plipuech	4	6^{3}
(Mexico) F Contreras (United States) C Harrison	6	2	[9]
3	(Georgia (country)) N Dzalamidze; S Lansere	2	6	[11]
(Netherlands) A Hartono (China) X You	7	6
(Ukraine) K Bondarenko (India) A Raina	5	1
(Japan) E Hayashi (Japan) K Morisaki	6^{4}	7	[9]
2	(United Kingdom) A Barnett (United Kingdom) O Nicholls	7^{7}	5	[11]

Quarterfinals
(China) Xiy Wang (China) Y Yuan	6	6^{2}	[10]
(Indonesia) B Gumulya (Indonesia) J Rompies	4	7^{7}	[6]
(Hong Kong) E Chong (Hong Kong) C Wong	7	3	[8]
(France) J Ponchet (Netherlands) B Schoofs	5	6	[10]
(Philippines) A Eala (Japan) N Kawaguchi	4	6	[12]
3	(Georgia (country)) N Dzalamidze; S Lansere	6	3	[10]
(Netherlands) A Hartono (China) X You	3	3
2	(United Kingdom) A Barnett (United Kingdom) O Nicholls	6	6

Semifinals
(China) Xiy Wang (China) Y Yuan	2	5
(France) J Ponchet (Netherlands) B Schoofs	6	7
(Philippines) A Eala (Japan) N Kawaguchi	0	7	6
2	(United Kingdom) A Barnett (United Kingdom) O Nicholls	6	5	[10]

Final
(France) J Ponchet (Netherlands) B Schoofs	4	6	[10]
2	(United Kingdom) A Barnett (United Kingdom) O Nicholls	6	1	[7]
