= 2022 Championnats Banque Nationale de Granby – Women's doubles =

Women's doubles
- 2022 Championnats Banque Nationale de Granby

Final
- Champions: (United Kingdom) Alicia Barnett (United Kingdom) Olivia Nicholls
- Runners-up: (United Kingdom) Harriet Dart (Netherlands) Rosalie van der Hoek
- Score: 5–7, 6–3, [10–1]

Events
Singles	men	women
Doubles	men	women
← 2019 ·	Championnats de Granby	· 2023 →

Alicia Barnett and Olivia Nicholls defeated Harriet Dart and Rosalie van der Hoek in the final, 5–7, 6–3, [10–1] to win the doubles tennis title at the 2022 Championnats de Granby.

Haruka Kaji and Junri Namigata were the reigning champions from 2019, when the tournament was an ITF tournament, but their rankings did not qualify them to participate this year.

== Seeds ==
1. (Poland) Alicja Rosolska / (New Zealand) Erin Routliffe (first round)
2. (Romania) Monica Niculescu / (Romania) Raluca Olaru (quarterfinals)
3. (Hungary) Anna Bondár / (Belgium) Greet Minnen (quarterfinals, withdrew)
4. (Ukraine) Nadiia Kichenok / (Slovakia) Tereza Mihalíková (quarterfinals)

== Draw ==
=== Key ===
- Q = Qualifier
- WC = Wild card
- LL = Lucky loser
- Alt = Alternate
- SE = Special exempt
- PR = Protected ranking
- ITF = ITF entry
- JE = Junior exempt
- w/o = Walkover
- r = Retired
- d = Defaulted
- SR = Special ranking

=== Draw ===
First round
1	(Poland) A Rosolska (New Zealand) E Routliffe	4	7	[6]
(Canada) R Marino (Australia) O Tjandramulia	6	5	[10]
(Germany) T Maria (France) D Parry	6	6
(Hungary) T Babos (United States) A Kulikov	3	4
3	(Hungary) A Bondár (Belgium) G Minnen	6	6
(United States) S Santamaria (Belgium) K Zimmermann	0	4
WC	(Canada) K Cross (Canada) V Mboko	0	7	[6]
(United Kingdom) H Dart (Netherlands) R van der Hoek	6	5	[10]
(Georgia (country)) O Kalashnikova (United States) I Neel	4	3
(United Kingdom) A Barnett (United Kingdom) O Nicholls	6	6
WC	(Canada) C Brace (Canada) M Stakusic	2	6^{1}
4	(Ukraine) N Kichenok (Slovakia) T Mihalíková	6	7^{7}
(Australia) D Saville (Japan) E Shibahara	4	6	[14]
(Poland) P Kania-Choduń (Czech Republic) R Voráčová	6	4	[12]
(Norway) U Eikeri (Montenegro) D Kovinić	6	6^{4}	[6]
2	(Romania) M Niculescu (Romania) R Olaru	2	7^{7}	[10]

Quarterfinals
(Canada) R Marino (Australia) O Tjandramulia	w/o
(Germany) T Maria (France) D Parry
3	(Hungary) A Bondár (Belgium) G Minnen
(United Kingdom) H Dart (Netherlands) R van der Hoek	w/o
(United Kingdom) A Barnett (United Kingdom) O Nicholls	7^{7}	6^{1}	[10]
4	(Ukraine) N Kichenok (Slovakia) T Mihalíková	6^{5}	7^{7}	[8]
(Australia) D Saville (Japan) E Shibahara	2	6	[10]
2	(Romania) M Niculescu (Romania) R Olaru	6	3	[8]

Semifinals
(Canada) R Marino (Australia) O Tjandramulia	6^{5}	1
(United Kingdom) H Dart (Netherlands) R van der Hoek	7^{7}	6
(United Kingdom) A Barnett (United Kingdom) O Nicholls	w/o
(Australia) D Saville (Japan) E Shibahara

Final
(United Kingdom) H Dart (Netherlands) R van der Hoek	7	3	[1]
(United Kingdom) A Barnett (United Kingdom) O Nicholls	5	6	[10]
