= 2023 Wimbledon Championships – Women's doubles =

Women's doubles
- 2023 Wimbledon Championships

Final
- Champions: (Chinese Taipei) Hsieh Su-wei (Czech Republic) Barbora Strýcová
- Runners-up: (Australia) Storm Hunter (Belgium) Elise Mertens
- Score: 7–5, 6–4

Events
Singles	men	women		boys	girls
Doubles	men	women	mixed	boys	girls
WC Singles	men	women	quad
WC Doubles	men	women	quad
Legends	men	women	mixed
14&U Singles	boys	girls
← 2022 ·	Wimbledon Championships	· 2024 →

Hsieh Su-wei and Barbora Strýcová defeated Storm Hunter and Elise Mertens in the final, 7–5, 6–4 to win the women's doubles tennis title at the 2023 Wimbledon Championships. It was Hsieh's fourth Wimbledon women's doubles title and Strýcová's second, with the pair having teamed up previously to win the title in 2019. Hsieh completed the Channel Slam (having won the French Open partnering Wang Xinyu) with the title.

Barbora Krejčíková and Kateřina Siniaková were the reigning champions, but withdrew due to a left leg injury sustained by Krejčiková in the singles tournament.

Siniaková and Jessica Pegula were in contention for the women's doubles No. 1 ranking. Siniaková retained the top spot after Pegula lost in the third round.

== Seeds ==
1. (Czech Republic) Barbora Krejčíková / (Czech Republic) Kateřina Siniaková (withdrew)
2. (United States) Coco Gauff / (United States) Jessica Pegula (third round)
3. (Australia) Storm Hunter / (Belgium) Elise Mertens (final)
4. (United States) Nicole Melichar-Martinez / (Australia) Ellen Perez (first round)
5. (United States) Desirae Krawczyk / (Netherlands) Demi Schuurs (second round)
6. (Canada) Leylah Fernandez / (United States) Taylor Townsend (second round)
7. (Ukraine) Lyudmyla Kichenok / (Latvia) Jeļena Ostapenko (first round)
8. (Japan) Shuko Aoyama / (Japan) Ena Shibahara (first round)
9. Veronika Kudermetova / Liudmila Samsonova (withdrew)
10. (United States) Asia Muhammad / (Mexico) Giuliana Olmos (first round)
11. (Kazakhstan) Anna Danilina / (China) Xu Yifan (first round)
12. (Chinese Taipei) Chan Hao-ching / (Chinese Taipei) Latisha Chan (second round)
13. (Japan) Miyu Kato / (Indonesia) Aldila Sutjiadi (third round)
14. Victoria Azarenka / (Brazil) Beatriz Haddad Maia (second round, withdrew)
15. (Ukraine) Marta Kostyuk / (Romania) Elena-Gabriela Ruse (second round)
16. (United States) Caroline Dolehide / (China) Zhang Shuai (semifinals)

Click on the seed number of a player to go to their draw section.

== Draw ==
=== Key ===
- Q = Qualifier
- WC = Wild card
- LL = Lucky loser
- Alt = Alternate
- ITF = ITF entry
- PR = Protected ranking
- SR = Special ranking
- SE = Special exempt
- JE = Junior exempt
- JR = Junior Accelerator Programme entrant
- CO = College Accelerator Programme entrant
- NG = Next Gen Accelerator Program entrant
- w/o = Walkover
- r = Retired
- d = Defaulted

=== Finals ===
Quarterfinals
16	(United States) Caroline Dolehide (China) Zhang Shuai	6	6
(Georgia (country)) Oksana Kalashnikova; Iryna Shymanovich	4	1
3	(Australia) Storm Hunter (Belgium) Elise Mertens	6	6
WC	(United Kingdom) Naiktha Bains (United Kingdom) Maia Lumsden	2	1
(France) Caroline Garcia (Brazil) Luisa Stefani	6^{5}	4
PR	(Chinese Taipei) Hsieh Su-wei (Czech Republic) Barbora Strýcová	7^{7}	6
(Czech Republic) Marie Bouzková (Spain) Sara Sorribes Tormo	7^{7}	7
(Germany) Laura Siegemund; Vera Zvonareva	6^{2}	5

Semifinals
16	(United States) Caroline Dolehide (China) Zhang Shuai	1	1
3	(Australia) Storm Hunter (Belgium) Elise Mertens	6	6
PR	(Chinese Taipei) Hsieh Su-wei (Czech Republic) Barbora Strýcová	6	6
(Czech Republic) Marie Bouzková (Spain) Sara Sorribes Tormo	4	1

Final
3	(Australia) Storm Hunter (Belgium) Elise Mertens	5	4
PR	(Chinese Taipei) Hsieh Su-wei (Czech Republic) Barbora Strýcová	7	6

=== Top half ===
==== Section 1 ====
First round
Alt	(Belgium) Y Bonaventure (Belgium) M Zanevska	4	4
(Chinese Taipei) F-h Wu (China) L Zhu	6	6
PR	(Ukraine) K Baindl (Australia) D Saville	6	7
(Germany) A-L Friedsam (Egypt) M Sherif	4	5
(Italy) J Paolini (Italy) M Trevisan	4	4
(Japan) E Hozumi (Spain) R Masarova	6	6
(United States) E Navarro (Estonia) I Neel	4	3
16	(United States) C Dolehide (China) S Zhang	6	6
Alt	(Brazil) I Gamarra Martins; L Marozava	6	6
(United Kingdom) A Barnett (United Kingdom) O Nicholls	0	3
WC	(United States) D Collins (United States) A Riske-Amritraj	4	4
PR	(Romania) A Bogdan (Romania) J Cristian	6	6
(Norway) U Eikeri; A Panova	6	2	7
(Czech Republic) L Fruhvirtová (Kazakhstan) Y Putintseva	2	6	5
(Georgia (country)) O Kalashnikova; I Shymanovich	6	6
8	(Japan) S Aoyama (Japan) E Shibahara	2	4

Second round
(Chinese Taipei) F-h Wu (China) L Zhu	6	6
PR	(Ukraine) K Baindl (Australia) D Saville	4	3
(Japan) E Hozumi (Spain) R Masarova	4	5
16	(United States) C Dolehide (China) S Zhang	6	7
Alt	(Brazil) I Gamarra Martins; L Marozava	6	6
PR	(Romania) A Bogdan (Romania) J Cristian	4	4
(Norway) U Eikeri; A Panova	0	4
(Georgia (country)) O Kalashnikova; I Shymanovich	6	6

Third round
(Chinese Taipei) F-h Wu (China) L Zhu	3	6	4
16	(United States) C Dolehide (China) S Zhang	6	3	6
Alt	(Brazil) I Gamarra Martins; L Marozava	4	6^{8}
(Georgia (country)) O Kalashnikova; I Shymanovich	6	7^{10}

Quarterfinals
16	(United States) C Dolehide (China) S Zhang	6	6
(Georgia (country)) O Kalashnikova; I Shymanovich	4	1

==== Section 2 ====
First round
3	(Australia) S Hunter (Belgium) E Mertens	6	6
(Ukraine) N Kichenok (Poland) A Rosolska	0	2
(Chile) A Guarachi (New Zealand) E Routliffe	7^{7}	6^{6}	2
(Romania) I-C Begu (Ukraine) A Kalinina	6^{2}	7^{8}	6
(Italy) S Errani (Austria) J Grabher	3	4
(Czech Republic) M Kolodziejová (Czech Republic) M Vondroušová	6	6
Alt	(Sweden) R Peterson (Slovakia) AK Schmiedlová	5	3
15	(Ukraine) M Kostyuk (Romania) E-G Ruse	7	6
11	(Kazakhstan) A Danilina (China) Y Xu	6	6^{3}	6^{9}
WC	(United Kingdom) N Bains (United Kingdom) M Lumsden	3	7^{7}	7^{11}
(Poland) M Linette (United States) B Pera	6	6
Alt	(Germany) T Maria (Poland) K Piter	3	3
(Romania) M Niculescu (Argentina) N Podoroska	6	6^{6}	1
(Slovakia) V Hrunčáková (Slovakia) T Mihalíková	1	7^{8}	6
WC	(United Kingdom) H Dart (United Kingdom) H Watson	6	3	6
7	(Ukraine) L Kichenok (Latvia) J Ostapenko	4	6	4

Second round
3	(Australia) S Hunter (Belgium) E Mertens	6	2
(Romania) I-C Begu (Ukraine) A Kalinina	2	0^{r}
(Czech Republic) M Kolodziejová (Czech Republic) M Vondroušová	1	6	6
15	(Ukraine) M Kostyuk (Romania) E-G Ruse	6	1	4
WC	(United Kingdom) N Bains (United Kingdom) M Lumsden	6	6
(Poland) M Linette (United States) B Pera	4	4
(Slovakia) V Hrunčáková (Slovakia) T Mihalíková	1	6	6
WC	(United Kingdom) H Dart (United Kingdom) H Watson	6	2	4

Third round
3	(Australia) S Hunter (Belgium) E Mertens	w/o
(Czech Republic) M Kolodziejová (Czech Republic) M Vondroušová
WC	(United Kingdom) N Bains (United Kingdom) M Lumsden	6	6^{5}	6
(Slovakia) V Hrunčáková (Slovakia) T Mihalíková	3	7^{7}	3

Quarterfinals
3	(Australia) S Hunter (Belgium) E Mertens	6	6
WC	(United Kingdom) N Bains (United Kingdom) M Lumsden	2	1

=== Bottom half ===
==== Section 3 ====
First round
6	(Canada) L Fernandez (United States) T Townsend	6	6
(United States) A Parks (United States) P Stearns	1	3
(United States) A Krueger (United States) C McNally	3	6^{3}
(France) C Garcia (Brazil) L Stefani	6	7^{7}
(Canada) G Dabrowski (Serbia) A Krunić	4	0
PR	(United States) L Davis (Netherlands) R van der Hoek	6	6
(Hungary) T Babos (Belgium) K Flipkens	6	6
10	(United States) A Muhammad (Mexico) G Olmos	3	4
13	(Japan) M Kato (Indonesia) A Sutjiadi	6	6
(Italy) L Bronzetti (Bulgaria) V Tomova	4	4
WC	(United Kingdom) E Appleton (United Kingdom) J Burrage	3	4
Y Sizikova (Belgium) K Zimmermann	6	6
PR	(Chinese Taipei) S-w Hsieh (Czech Republic) B Strýcová	6	6
A Blinkova (France) V Gracheva	1	2
E Alexandrova (China) Z Yang	6	7^{9}
4	(United States) N Melichar-Martinez (Australia) E Perez	4	6^{7}

Second round
6	(Canada) L Fernandez (United States) T Townsend	4	7^{8}	3
(France) C Garcia (Brazil) L Stefani	6	6^{6}	6
PR	(United States) L Davis (Netherlands) R van der Hoek	6	3	1^{r}
(Hungary) T Babos (Belgium) K Flipkens	2	6	2
13	(Japan) M Kato (Indonesia) A Sutjiadi	7	6
Y Sizikova (Belgium) K Zimmermann	5	4
PR	(Chinese Taipei) S-w Hsieh (Czech Republic) B Strýcová	3	6	6
E Alexandrova (China) Z Yang	6	2	4

Third round
(France) C Garcia (Brazil) L Stefani	7^{10}	6
(Hungary) T Babos (Belgium) K Flipkens	6^{8}	3
13	(Japan) M Kato (Indonesia) A Sutjiadi	5	6^{4}
PR	(Chinese Taipei) S-w Hsieh (Czech Republic) B Strýcová	7	7^{7}

Quarterfinals
(France) C Garcia (Brazil) L Stefani	6^{5}	4
PR	(Chinese Taipei) S-w Hsieh (Czech Republic) B Strýcová	7^{7}	6

==== Section 4 ====
First round
5	(United States) D Krawczyk (Netherlands) D Schuurs	6	4	7^{10}
(Georgia (country)) N Dzalamidze (United States) S Santamaria	1	6	6^{7}
(Hungary) A Bondár (Belgium) G Minnen	6	7^{7}
WC	(United States) M Jones (United States) S Stephens	2	6^{4}
(Czech Republic) L Nosková (China) Xiy Wang	4	4
(Czech Republic) M Bouzková (Spain) S Sorribes Tormo	6	6
(United States) S Chang (United States) A Kulikov	3	2
12	(Chinese Taipei) H-c Chan (Chinese Taipei) L Chan	6	6
14	V Azarenka (Brazil) B Haddad Maia	6	7
(Spain) C Bucșa (Japan) M Ninomiya	4	5
(Germany) L Siegemund; V Zvonareva	6	7
(Czech Republic) T Martincová (Croatia) D Vekić	4	5
Alt	(Czech Republic) A Dețiuc (Venezuela) A Gámiz	6	2	6
WC	(United Kingdom) F Christie (United Kingdom) A Collins	4	6	3
K Rakhimova; A Sasnovich	6	5	2
2	(United States) C Gauff (United States) J Pegula	3	7	6

Second round
5	(United States) D Krawczyk (Netherlands) D Schuurs	4	6	4
(Hungary) A Bondár (Belgium) G Minnen	6	4	6
(Czech Republic) M Bouzková (Spain) S Sorribes Tormo	6	6
12	(Chinese Taipei) H-c Chan (Chinese Taipei) L Chan	4	4
14	V Azarenka (Brazil) B Haddad Maia
(Germany) L Siegemund; V Zvonareva	w/o
Alt	(Czech Republic) A Dețiuc (Venezuela) A Gámiz	6	1	4
2	(United States) C Gauff (United States) J Pegula	4	6	6

Third round
(Hungary) A Bondár (Belgium) G Minnen	3	6	3
(Czech Republic) M Bouzková (Spain) S Sorribes Tormo	6	3	6
(Germany) L Siegemund; V Zvonareva	6	6
2	(United States) C Gauff (United States) J Pegula	3	3

Quarterfinals
(Czech Republic) M Bouzková (Spain) S Sorribes Tormo	7^{7}	7
(Germany) L Siegemund; V Zvonareva	6^{2}	5

== Seeded teams ==
The following are the seeded teams. Seedings are based on WTA rankings as of 26 June 2023.

Country	Player	Country	Player	Rank	Seed
~~CZE~~	~~Barbora Krejčíková~~	~~CZE~~	~~Kateřina Siniaková~~	~~3~~	~~1~~
USA	Coco Gauff	USA	Jessica Pegula	7	2
AUS	Storm Hunter	BEL	Elise Mertens	13	3
USA	Nicole Melichar-Martinez	AUS	Ellen Perez	17	4
USA	Desirae Krawczyk	NED	Demi Schuurs	24	5
CAN	Leylah Fernandez	USA	Taylor Townsend	26	6
UKR	Lyudmyla Kichenok	LAT	Jeļena Ostapenko	34	7
JPN	Shuko Aoyama	JPN	Ena Shibahara	37	8
	~~Veronika Kudermetova~~		~~Liudmila Samsonova~~	~~50~~	~~9~~
USA	Asia Muhammad	MEX	Giuliana Olmos	51	10
KAZ	Anna Danilina	CHN	Xu Yifan	51	11
TPE	Chan Hao-ching	TPE	Latisha Chan	56	12
JPN	Miyu Kato	INA	Aldila Sutjiadi	63	13
	Victoria Azarenka	BRA	Beatriz Haddad Maia	65	14
UKR	Marta Kostyuk	ROU	Elena-Gabriela Ruse	66	15
USA	Caroline Dolehide	CHN	Zhang Shuai	77	16

== Other entry information ==
=== Wildcards ===
- (United Kingdom) Emily Appleton / (United Kingdom) Jodie Burrage
- (United Kingdom) Naiktha Bains / (United Kingdom) Maia Lumsden
- (United Kingdom) Freya Christie / (United Kingdom) Ali Collins
- (United States) Danielle Collins / (United States) Alison Riske-Amritraj
- (United Kingdom) Harriet Dart / (United Kingdom) Heather Watson
- (United States) Makenna Jones / (United States) Sloane Stephens

=== Protected ranking ===
- (Ukraine) Kateryna Baindl / (Australia) Daria Saville
- (Romania) Ana Bogdan / (Romania) Jaqueline Cristian
- (United States) Lauren Davis / (Netherlands) Rosalie van der Hoek
- (Chinese Taipei) Hsieh Su-wei / (Czech Republic) Barbora Strýcová

=== Alternates ===
- (Belgium) Ysaline Bonaventure / (Belgium) Maryna Zanevska
- (Czech Republic) Anastasia Dețiuc / (Venezuela) Andrea Gámiz
- (Brazil) Ingrid Gamarra Martins / Lidziya Marozava
- (Germany) Tatjana Maria / (Poland) Katarzyna Piter
- (Sweden) Rebecca Peterson / (Slovakia) Anna Karolína Schmiedlová

=== Withdrawals ===
- (Italy) Elisabetta Cocciaretto / (Denmark) Clara Tauson → replaced by (Sweden) Rebecca Peterson / (Slovakia) Anna Karolína Schmiedlová
- (France) Alizé Cornet / (Hungary) Panna Udvardy → replaced by (Czech Republic) Anastasia Dețiuc / (Venezuela) Andrea Gámiz
- Anna Kalinskaya / (United States) Caty McNally → replaced by (United States) Ashlyn Krueger / (United States) Caty McNally
- (Czech Republic) Barbora Krejčíková / (Czech Republic) Kateřina Siniaková → replaced by (Belgium) Ysaline Bonaventure / (Belgium) Maryna Zanevska
- Veronika Kudermetova / Liudmila Samsonova → replaced by (Brazil) Ingrid Gamarra Martins / Lidziya Marozava
- (United States) Shelby Rogers / (Belgium) Yanina Wickmayer → replaced by (Germany) Tatjana Maria / (Poland) Katarzyna Piter
- (Netherlands) Arantxa Rus / (Egypt) Mayar Sherif → replaced by (Germany) Anna-Lena Friedsam / (Egypt) Mayar Sherif
