= 2023 Ando Securities Open – Singles =

Singles
- 2023 Ando Securities Open

Final
- Champion: (Switzerland) Viktorija Golubic
- Runner-up: (China) Wang Xiyu
- Score: 6–4, 3–6, 6–4

Events
Singles	Doubles
← 2022 ·	Ando Securities Open	· 2024 →

Wang Xinyu was the defending champion but chose to compete at the 2023 US Open instead.

Viktorija Golubic won the title, defeating Wang Xiyu in the final, 6–4, 3–6, 6–4.

== Seeds ==
1. (Japan) Nao Hibino (first round)
2. (Germany) Jule Niemeier (quarterfinals)
3. (China) Wang Xiyu (final)
4. (China) Yuan Yue (first round)
5. (Australia) Kimberly Birrell (semifinals)
6. (Hungary) Panna Udvardy (first round)
7. (Switzerland) Viktorija Golubic (champion)
8. (France) Jessika Ponchet (first round)

== Draw ==
=== Key ===
- Q = Qualifier
- WC = Wild card
- LL = Lucky loser
- Alt = Alternate
- SE = Special exempt
- PR = Protected ranking
- ITF = ITF entry
- JE = Junior exempt
- w/o = Walkover
- r = Retired
- d = Defaulted
- SR = Special ranking

=== Finals ===
Semifinals
7	(Switzerland) Viktorija Golubic	6	6
Q	(Ukraine) Kateryna Volodko	4	1
3	(China) Wang Xiyu	6	6
5	(Australia) Kimberly Birrell	4	4

Final
7	(Switzerland) Viktorija Golubic	6	3	6
3	(China) Wang Xiyu	4	6	4

=== Top half ===
First round
1	(Japan) N Hibino	6	4	2
Q	(China) X You	0	6	6
(Hong Kong) E Chong	6	6
(Switzerland) J Teichmann	2	3
(Japan) M Hontama	6	6^{3}	0^{r}
(Japan) H Sakatsume	2	7^{7}	2
Q	(Japan) M Ninomiya	1	1
7	(Switzerland) V Golubic	6	6
4	(China) Y Yuan	6	2	3
(Japan) H Kaji	4	6	6
WC	(Japan) S Hosogi	0	6	3
Q	(Ukraine) K Volodko	6	3	6
(Netherlands) A Hartono	6	6
WC	(Japan) K Okamura	4	1
(United Kingdom) H Dart	3	6	6
6	(Hungary) P Udvardy	6	3	4

Second round
Q	(China) X You	6	3	6
(Hong Kong) E Chong	1	6	4
(Japan) H Sakatsume	3	3
7	(Switzerland) V Golubic	6	6
(Japan) H Kaji	4	2
Q	(Ukraine) K Volodko	6	6
(Netherlands) A Hartono	6	6
(United Kingdom) H Dart	3	3

Quarterfinals
Q	(China) X You	7^{7}	0	1
7	(Switzerland) V Golubic	6^{3}	6	6
Q	(Ukraine) K Volodko	6	6
(Netherlands) A Hartono	3	2

Semifinals
7	(Switzerland) V Golubic	6	6
Q	(Ukraine) K Volodko	4	1

=== Bottom half ===
First round
8	(France) J Ponchet	3	3
WC	(Japan) Y Naito	6	6
Q	(Canada) C Zhao	6	1	6
(South Korea) S-j Jang	3	6	2
Q	(Japan) A Ito	7^{7}	1	7^{7}
(United States) E Mandlik	6^{4}	6	6^{0}
Q	(Mexico) F Contreras	2	6^{5}
3	(China) Xiy Wang	6	7^{7}
5	(Australia) K Birrell	7	6
V Savinykh	5	4
Q	(Philippines) A Eala	6	6
WC	(Japan) N Kawaguchi	4	3
(India) A Raina	6	6
Q	S Lansere	3	2
(Japan) M Uchijima	2	4
2	(Germany) J Niemeier	6	6

Second round
WC	(Japan) Y Naito	6	6
Q	(Canada) C Zhao	4	3
Q	(Japan) A Ito	1	4
3	(China) Xiy Wang	6	6
5	(Australia) K Birrell	4	7^{7}	6
Q	(Philippines) A Eala	6	6^{5}	2
(India) A Raina	2	7	6^{8}
2	(Germany) J Niemeier	6	5	7^{10}

Quarterfinals
WC	(Japan) Y Naito	3	3
3	(China) Xiy Wang	6	6
5	(Australia) K Birrell	6	6
2	(Germany) J Niemeier	4	3

Semifinals
3	(China) Xiy Wang	6	6
5	(Australia) K Birrell	4	4
