= 2025 Ando Securities Open =

Tennis tournament

- Date: 21–27 April 2025
- Edition: 8th
- Category: ITF Women's World Tennis Tour
- Prize money: $100,000
- Surface: Hard / Outdoor
- Location: Tokyo, Japan

Champions

Singles
- (Japan) Wakana Sonobe

Doubles
- (China) Guo Hanyu / (Japan) Ena Shibahara
- Ando Securities Open

The 2025 Ando Securities Open was a professional tennis tournament played on outdoor hard courts. It was the eighth edition of the tournament, which was part of the 2025 ITF Women's World Tennis Tour. It took place in Tokyo, Japan, between 21 and 27 April 2025.

== Champions ==
=== Singles ===
- (Japan) Wakana Sonobe def. (Japan) Ena Shibahara, 6–4, 6–7^{(1–7)}, 6–3.

=== Doubles ===
- (China) Guo Hanyu / (Japan) Ena Shibahara def. (Thailand) Mananchaya Sawangkaew / (Thailand) Lanlana Tararudee, 5–7, 7–6^{(7–1)}, [10–5].

== Singles main draw entrants ==
=== Seeds ===
Country	Player	Rank	Seed
JPN	Aoi Ito	104	1
CAN	Rebecca Marino	106	2
THA	Mananchaya Sawangkaew	112	3
AUS	Maddison Inglis	132	4
JPN	Ena Shibahara	135	5
AUS	Talia Gibson	136	6
AUS	Destanee Aiava	156	7
~~CHN~~	~~Zhang Shuai~~	~~165~~	~~8~~

- Rankings are as of 14 April 2025.

=== Other entrants ===
The following players received wildcards into the singles main draw:

- (Japan) Hayu Kinoshita
- (Japan) Ena Koike
- (Japan) Kayo Nishimura
- (Japan) Wakana Sonobe

The following player received entry into the singles main draw using a junior exempt:

- (Australia) Emerson Jones

The following players received entry from the qualifying draw:

- (Kazakhstan) Zarina Diyas
- (Japan) Haruka Kaji
- (China) Ma Yexin
- (South Korea) Park So-hyun
- (Japan) Ayano Shimizu
- (Japan) Eri Shimizu
- (Japan) Mei Yamaguchi
- (China) Zhu Lin

The following player received entry as lucky loser:

- (Japan) Ayumi Koshiishi
