= Alicia Barnett =

British tennis player (born 1994)

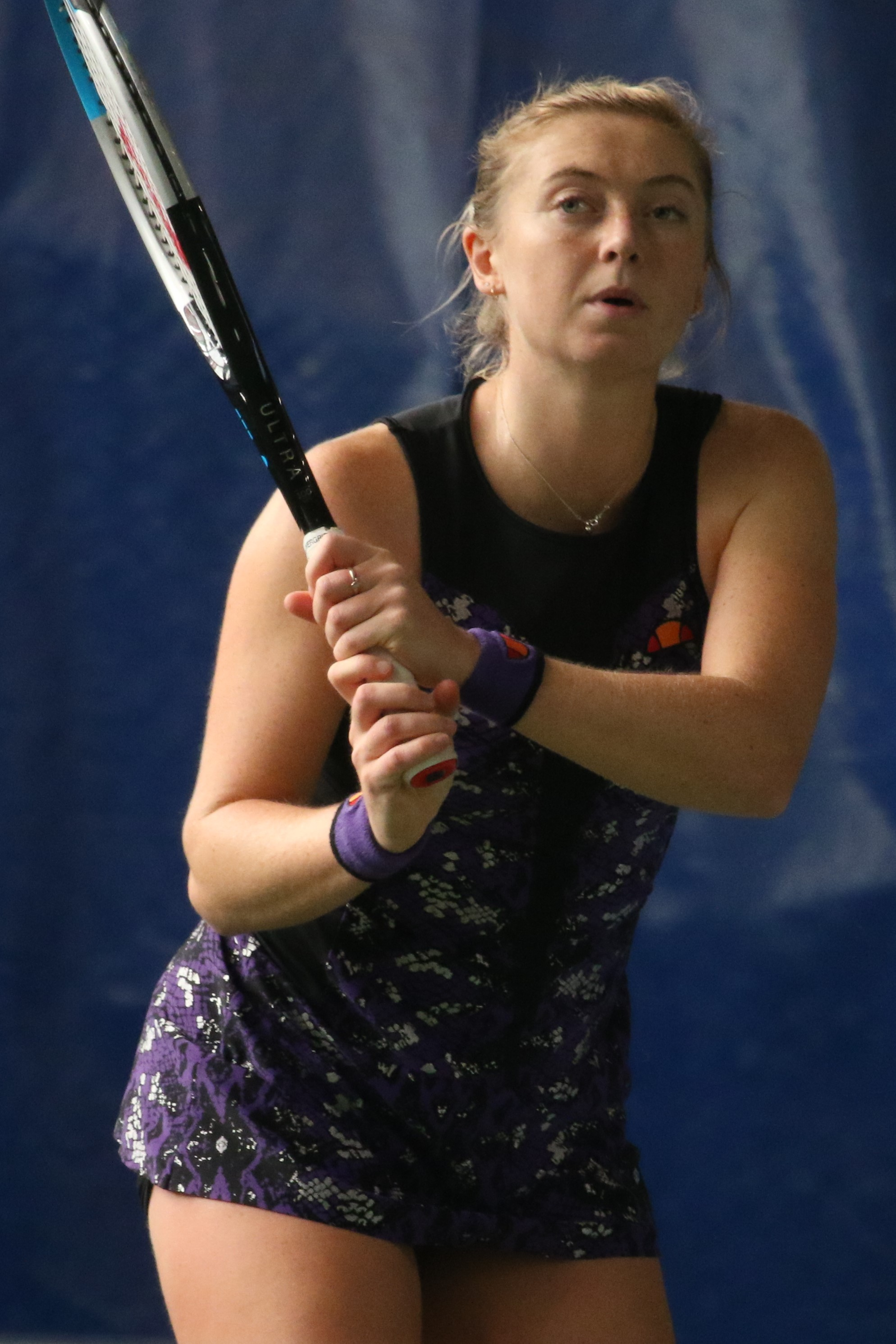
- Barnett at the 2021 ITF Poitiers
- Country (sports): Great Britain
- Born: 18 October 1993 (age 33) Gloucester, England, UK
- Height: 1.77 m (5 ft 10 in)
- Turned pro: 2016
- Retired: 2026
- Plays: Right (two-handed backhand)
- Coach: Ian MacDonald
- Prize money: $272,043

Singles
- Career record: 136–142
- Career titles: 0
- Highest ranking: No. 453 (13 May 2019)

Doubles
- Career record: 258–205
- Career titles: 1
- Highest ranking: No. 59 (24 October 2022)
- Current ranking: No. 150 (31 August 2026)

Grand Slam doubles results
- Australian Open: 1R (2023)
- French Open: 1R (2023)
- Wimbledon: 2R (2022)
- US Open: 1R (2022)

Grand Slam mixed doubles results
- Wimbledon: QF (2022, 2024)

Team competitions
- BJK Cup: SF (2022), record 3–1

Alicia Barnett (born 18 October 1993) is a British former professional tennis player who specialised in doubles. On 24 October 2022, she achieved her career-high doubles ranking of world No. 59.

== Early life and college years ==
Barnett's home is in Painswick, Gloucestershire. She is one of four siblings, including younger sister Sophie Barnett. She began playing tennis at the age of seven, started competing on the ITF Women's Circuit at the age of 16/17.

Barnett joined Team Bath Tennis High-International Performance Academy as a 16-year-old through the Advanced Apprenticeship in Sport and Exercise (AASE) programme and has since returned for postgraduate studies. It is believed that she took her studies abroad and graduated from Northwestern University in Illinois, in 2017.

== Career overview ==
Barnett made her WTA Tour debut, partnering with Olivia Nicholls, at the 2022 Lyon Open where they reached the final. Their subsequent performance throughout 2022, including winning the 2022 Championnats de Granby, led to both being selected for the British team ties vs. Kazakhstan and Spain at the 2022 Billie Jean King Cup Finals.

Partnering with Jonny O'Mara at the 2022 Wimbledon Championships, Barnett reached the mixed doubles quarterfinals. She repeated the feat, this time alongside Marcus Willis, at the 2024 Wimbledon Championships.

In September 2026, Barnett announced her retirement from professional tennis to become a coach of University of Bath's Team Bath Tennis.

== Performance timeline ==
Key
| W | F | SF | QF | #R | RR | Q# | DNQ | A | NH |

(W) winner; (F) finalist; (SF) semifinalist; (QF) quarterfinalist; (#R) rounds 4, 3, 2, 1; (RR) round-robin stage; (Q#) qualification round; (DNQ) did not qualify; (A) absent; (NH) not held; (SR) strike rate (events won / competed); (W–L) win–loss record.
To avoid confusion and double counting, these charts are updated at the conclusion of a tournament or when the player's participation has ended.

=== Doubles ===
| Tournament | 2022 | 2023 | 2024 | 2025 | 2026 | SR | W–L |
|---|---|---|---|---|---|---|---|
Grand Slam tournaments
| Australian Open | A | 1R | A | A | A | 0 / 1 | 0–1 |
| French Open | A | 1R | A | A | A | 0 / 1 | 0–1 |
| Wimbledon | 2R | 1R | 1R | 1R | A | 0 / 4 | 1–4 |
| US Open | 1R | A | A | A | A | 0 / 1 | 0–1 |
| Win–Loss | 1–2 | 0–3 | 0–1 | 0–1 | 0–0 | 0 / 7 | 1–7 |
National representation
| Billie Jean King Cup | SF | QR | A | A | A | 0 / 1 | 3–1 |
Career statistics
| | 2022 | 2023 | 2024 | 2025 | 2026 | SR | W–L |
| Tournaments | 15 | 17 | 4 | 0 | 0 | Career total: 36 | |
| Titles | 1 | 0 | 0 | 0 | 0 | Career total: 1 | |
| Finals | 2 | 0 | 0 | 0 | 0 | Career total: 2 | |
| Overall win–loss | 14–15 | 6–16 | 0–4 | 0–0 | 0–0 | 1 / 36 | 20–35 |
| Year-end ranking | 60 | 106 | 180 | 123 | | | |

== WTA Tour finals ==
=== Doubles: 2 (1 title, 1 runner-up) ===
| Legend WTA 250 (1–1) | Finals by surface Hard (1–1) |

| Result | W–L | Date | Tournament | Tier | Surface | Partner | Opponents | Score |
|---|---|---|---|---|---|---|---|---|
| Loss | 0–1 | Mar 2022 | Lyon Open, France | WTA 250 | Hard (i) | (United Kingdom) Olivia Nicholls | (Germany) Laura Siegemund (Russia) Vera Zvonareva | 5–7, 1–6 |
| Win | 1–1 | Aug 2022 | Championnats de Granby, Canada | WTA 250 | Hard | (United Kingdom) Olivia Nicholls | (United Kingdom) Harriet Dart (Netherlands) Rosalie van der Hoek | 5–7, 6–3, [10–1] |

== WTA 125 finals ==
=== Doubles: 5 (1 title, 4 runner-ups) ===
| Result | W–L | Date | Tournament | Surface | Partner | Opponents | Score |
|---|---|---|---|---|---|---|---|
| Loss | 0–1 | Dec 2022 | Open de Limoges, France | Hard (i) | (United Kingdom) Olivia Nicholls | (Georgia (country)) Oksana Kalashnikova (Ukraine) Marta Kostyuk | 5–7, 1–6 |
| Loss | 0–2 | Mar 2025 | Antalya Challenger, Turkiye | Clay | (France) Elixane Lechemia | (Hungary) Anna Bondár (Switzerland) Simona Waltert | 5–7, 6–2, [6–10] |
| Loss | 0–3 | Jun 2025 | Birmingham Open, UK | Grass | (France) Elixane Lechemia | (Australia) Destanee Aiava (Spain) Cristina Bucșa | 4–6, 2–6 |
| Loss | 0–4 | Jul 2026 | Bastad Open, Sweden | Clay | (France) Elixane Lechemia | (Colombia) Emiliana Arango (Switzerland) Simona Waltert | 4–6, 1–6 |
| Win | 1–4 | Jul 2026 | Open Ladies Kitzbühel, Austria | Clay | (France) Elixane Lechemia | (Spain) Yvonne Cavallé Reimers (Brazil) Laura Pigossi | 6–4, 6–3 |

== ITF Circuit finals ==
=== Singles: 1 (runner-up) ===
| Result | Date | Tournament | Tier | Surface | Opponent | Score |
|---|---|---|---|---|---|---|
| Loss | Jul 2017 | ITF Cantanhede, Portugal | W15 | Carpet | (Republic of Ireland) Sinéad Lohan | 2–6, 6–4, 1–6 |

=== Doubles: 35 (18 titles, 17 runner-ups) ===
Legend
W100 tournaments (2–3)
W60/75 tournaments (3–4)
W40 tournaments (1–0)
W25/35 tournaments (5–4)
W10/15 tournaments (7–6)

| Result | W–L | Date | Tournament | Tier | Surface | Partner | Opponents | Score |
|---|---|---|---|---|---|---|---|---|
| Loss | 0–1 | Nov 2016 | GB Pro-Series Shrewsbury, United Kingdom | W10 | Hard | (United Kingdom) Lauren Mcminn | (United Kingdom) Sarah Beth Grey (United Kingdom) Olivia Nicholls | 3–6, 3–6 |
| Win | 1–1 | Sep 2017 | ITF Madrid, Spain | W15 | Hard | (United Kingdom) Olivia Nicholls | (Spain) Marina Bassols Ribera (Spain) Júlia Payola | 6–1, 6–2 |
| Loss | 1–2 | Oct 2017 | ITF Wirral, UK | W15 | Hard | (United Kingdom) Laura Sainsbury | (United Kingdom) Maia Lumsden (United Kingdom) Samantha Murray | 4–6, 3–6 |
| Loss | 1–3 | Nov 2017 | ITF Sunderland, UK | W15 | Hard | (United Kingdom) Sarah Beth Grey | (Greece) Eleni Kordolaimi (United Kingdom) Maia Lumsden | 6–2, 2–6, [9–11] |
| Loss | 1–4 | Nov 2017 | ITF Stellenbosch, South Africa | W15 | Hard | (Switzerland) Nina Stadler | (Japan) Mana Ayukawa (South Africa) Chanel Simmonds | 2–6, 2–6 |
| Win | 2–4 | Mar 2018 | ITF Ramat Hasharon, Israel | W15 | Hard | (United Kingdom) Olivia Nicholls | (Ecuador) Charlotte Römer (Germany) Caroline Werner | 6–4, 7–6^{(4)} |
| Win | 3–4 | Mar 2018 | ITF Tel Aviv, Israel | W15 | Hard | (United Kingdom) Olivia Nicholls | (France) Mathilde Armitano (France) Elixane Lechemia | 7–6 ^{(3)}, 6–3 |
| Loss | 3–5 | Apr 2018 | ITF Sharm El Sheikh, Egypt | W15 | Hard | (Bulgaria) Julia Terziyska | (Austria) Melanie Klaffner (Russia) Anna Morgina | 5–7, 1–6 |
| Loss | 3–6 | Oct 2018 | ITF Cherbourg, France | W25 | Hard | (United Kingdom) Eden Silva | (Poland) Katarzyna Piter (Czech Republic) Barbora Štefková | 2–6, 1–6 |
| Win | 4–6 | Apr 2019 | ITF Bolton, UK | W25 | Hard | (United Kingdom) Jodie Burrage | (Romania) Laura Ioana Paar (Belgium) Helène Scholsen | 6–3, 6–3 |
| Win | 5–6 | Sep 2019 | ITF Sajur, Israel | W15 | Hard | (South Africa) Chanel Simmonds | (France) Amandine Cazeaux (Canada) Noelly Nsimba | 6–4, 6–4 |
| Win | 6–6 | Feb 2020 | ITF Sunderland, UK | W25 | Hard | (United Kingdom) Olivia Nicholls | (Spain) Celia Cerviño Ruiz (Spain) Maria Gutierrez Carrasco | 6–4, 7–6^{(6)} |
| Loss | 6–7 | Mar 2021 | ITF Sharm El Sheikh, Egypt | W15 | Hard | (Japan) Yuriko Miyazaki | (Japan) Momoko Kobori (Japan) Ayano Shimizu | 4–6, 1–6 |
| Win | 7–7 | Mar 2021 | ITF Sharm El Sheikh | W15 | Hard | (Japan) Yuriko Miyazaki | (South Korea) Ku Yeon-woo (Canada) Raphaelle Lacasse | 6–4, 6–1 |
| Win | 8–7 | Apr 2021 | ITF Sharm El Sheikh | W15 | Hard | (Israel) Lina Glushko | (Romania) Elena-Teodora Cadar (Australia) Olivia Gadecki | 6–4, 6–2 |
| Win | 9–7 | May 2021 | ITF Jerusalem, Israel | W15 | Hard | (United Kingdom) Emily Appleton | (Switzerland) Jenny Dürst (Switzerland) Nina Stadler | 6–4, 2–6, [11–9] |
| Win | 10–7 | Jun 2021 | ITF Figueira da Foz, Portugal | W25 | Hard | (United Kingdom) Olivia Nicholls | (Turkey) Berfu Cengiz (Russia) Anastasia Tikhonova | 6–3, 7–6^{(3)} |
| Win | 11–7 | Aug 2021 | ITF Vigo, Spain | W25 | Hard | (Australia) Olivia Gadecki | (Switzerland) Conny Perrin (Brazil) Laura Pigossi | 6–3, 6–2 |
| Loss | 11–8 | Sep 2021 | Caldas da Rainha Open, Portugal | W60 | Hard | (United Kingdom) Olivia Nicholls | (Japan) Momoko Kobori (Japan) Hiroko Kuwata | 6–7^{(5)}, 6–7^{(2)} |
| Loss | 11–9 | Sep 2021 | ITF Santarem, Portugal | W25 | Hard | (United Kingdom) Olivia Nicholls | (Belgium) Marie Benoît (United Kingdom) Eden Silva | 5–7, 1–6 |
| Loss | 11–10 | Nov 2021 | Open Nantes Atlantique, France | W60 | Hard (i) | (United Kingdom) Olivia Nicholls | (United Kingdom) Samantha Murray Sharan (France) Jessika Ponchet | 4–6, 2–6 |
| Win | 12–10 | Nov 2021 | ITF Funchal, Portugal | W25 | Hard | (Chinese Taipei) Hsieh Yu-chieh | (Portugal) Inês Murta (Latvia) Daniela Vismane | 6–1, 3–6, [10–8] |
| Loss | 12–11 | Dec 2021 | ITF Selva Gardena, Italy | W25 | Hard (i) | (United Kingdom) Olivia Nicholls | (Hong Kong) Eudice Chong (Japan) Moyuka Uchijima | 2–6, 1–6 |
| Loss | 12–12 | Jan 2022 | Open Andrézieux-Bouthéon, France | W60 | Hard (i) | (United Kingdom) Olivia Nicholls | (France) Estelle Cascino (France) Jessika Ponchet | 4–6, 1–6 |
| Loss | 12–13 | Feb 2022 | Open de l'Isère, France | W60 | Hard (i) | (United Kingdom) Olivia Nicholls | (India) Prarthana Thombare (Japan) Lily Miyazaki | 3–6, 3–6 |
| Win | 13–13 | Apr 2022 | Bellinzona Ladies Open, Switzerland | W60 | Clay | (United Kingdom) Olivia Nicholls | (Switzerland) Xenia Knoll; Oksana Selekhmeteva | 6–7^{(7)}, 6–4, [10–7] |
| Loss | 13–14 | May 2022 | Solgironès Open, Spain | W100 | Clay | (United Kingdom) Olivia Nicholls | (Andorra) Victoria Jiménez Kasintseva (Mexico) Renata Zarazúa | 4–6, 6–2, [8–10] |
| Win | 14–14 | Aug 2022 | Kozerki Open, Poland | W100 | Hard | (United Kingdom) Olivia Nicholls | (Poland) Katarzyna Kawa (Germany) Vivian Heisen | 6–1, 7–6^{(3)} |
| Win | 15–14 | Mar 2023 | Trnava Indoor, Slovakia | W60 | Hard (i) | (United Kingdom) Olivia Nicholls | Amina Anshba (Czech Republic) Anastasia Dețiuc | 6–3, 6–3 |
| Loss | 15–15 | Jun 2023 | Surbiton Trophy, UK | W100 | Grass | (United Kingdom) Olivia Nicholls | (Belgium) Yanina Wickmayer (United States) Sophie Chang | 4–6, 1–6 |
| Win | 16–15 | Jul 2023 | Open Araba en Femenino, Spain | W100 | Hard | (United Kingdom) Olivia Nicholls | (France) Estelle Cascino (Latvia) Diāna Marcinkēviča | 6–3, 6–4 |
| Loss | 16–16 | Sep 2023 | Tokyo Open, Japan | W100 | Hard | (United Kingdom) Olivia Nicholls | (France) Jessika Ponchet (Netherlands) Bibiane Schoofs | 6–4, 1–6, [7–10] |
| Win | 17–16 | Nov 2023 | ITF Pétange, Luxembourg | W40 | Hard (i) | (United Kingdom) Samantha Murray Sharan | (United Kingdom) Ali Collins (Netherlands) Isabelle Haverlag | 6–7^{(4)}, 6–1, [10–6] |
| Loss | 17–17 | Jan 2024 | GB Pro-Series Loughborough, UK | W35 | Hard (i) | (United Kingdom) Sarah Beth Grey | (United States) Liv Hovde (United Kingdom) Ella McDonald | 6–4, 2–6, [7–10] |
| Win | 18–17 | Apr 2025 | Chiasso Open, Switzerland | W75 | Clay | (France) Elixane Lechemia | (Algeria) Inès Ibbou (Netherlands) Bibiane Schoofs | 6–2, 6–3 |
