= Olivia Nicholls =

British tennis player (born 1994)

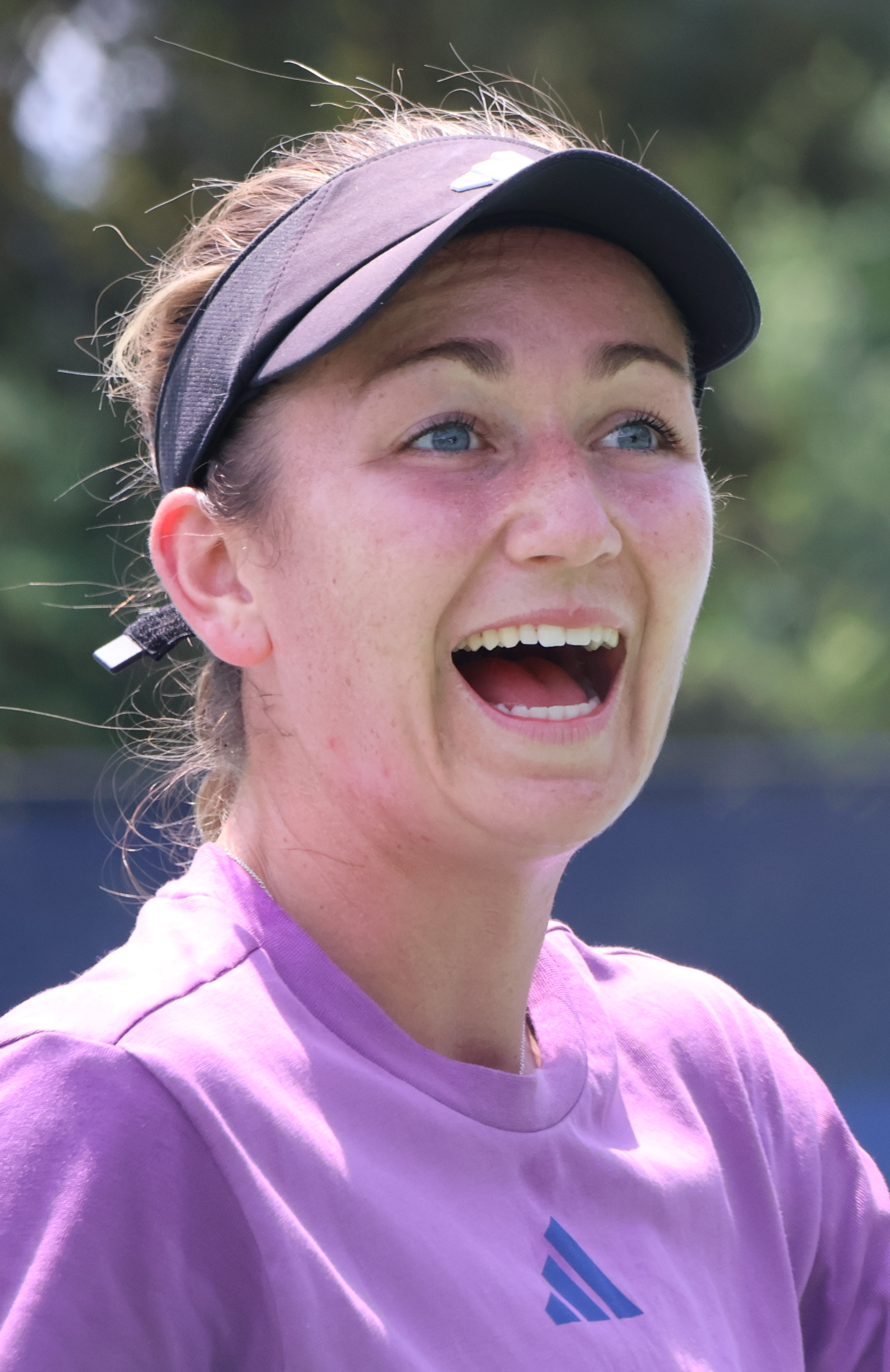
- Nicholls at the 2024 Washington Open
- Full name: Olivia Ann Nicholls
- Country (sports): Great Britain
- Born: 26 October 1994 (age 32) Norwich, England
- Height: 1.78 m (5 ft 10 in)
- Turned pro: 2017
- Plays: Right-handed (two-handed backhand)
- Prize money: US$ 1,253,085

Singles
- Career record: 32–40
- Career titles: 0
- Highest ranking: No. 943 (18 September 2017)

Doubles
- Career record: 285–191
- Career titles: 4
- Highest ranking: No. 21 (16 February 2026)
- Current ranking: No. 30 (2 November 2026)

Grand Slam doubles results
- Australian Open: 2R (2026)
- French Open: 3R (2025, 2026)
- Wimbledon: 3R (2024)
- US Open: 3R (2024)

Grand Slam mixed doubles results
- Australian Open: SF (2025)
- French Open: QF (2025)
- Wimbledon: SF (2023)

Team competitions
- BJK Cup: SF (2022, 2024), record 3–3
Medal record
Women's Tennis
Representing Great Britain
Summer Universiade
Bronze medal – third place	2017 Taipei	Doubles
- Last updated on: 6 November 2026.

Olivia Ann Nicholls (born 26 October 1994) is a British tennis player who specializes in doubles. On 16 February 2026, she peaked at No. 21 in the WTA doubles rankings.

Nicholls has won four doubles titles on the WTA Tour, one doubles title on the WTA Challenger Tour and 19 doubles titles on the ITF Circuit.

== Early life and education ==
Nicholls was born at the Norfolk and Norwich Hospital, the daughter of Ian and Ann Nicholls. She grew up in the Norfolk village of Acle. She completed a BSc in Sports Science with Management at Loughborough University.

== Career ==
At the 2017 Summer Universiade held in Taipei, Taiwan, she won the bronze medal in women's doubles, along with Emily Arbuthnott.

=== 2022–23: First WTA Tour title, Wimbledon mixed doubles semifinal ===
Nicholls made her WTA Tour debut at 2022 Lyon Open in the doubles draw, partnering with Alicia Barnett. The duo finished runners-up, losing the final to Laura Siegemund and Vera Zvonareva in straight sets. Nicholls and Barnett won the doubles title at the 2022 Championnats de Granby, defeating Harriet Dart and Rosalie van der Hoek in the final which went to a deciding champions tiebreak.

At the 2023 Wimbledon Championships, partnering with Jonny O'Mara, Nicholls reached the semifinals in the mixed doubles, losing out to eventual champions, Mate Pavić and Lyudmyla Kichenok.

=== 2024: Second career title, top 60, British No. 1 ===
Alongside Olivia Gadecki, Nicholls won the doubles title at the ATX Open defeating Katarzyna Kawa and Bibiane Schoofs in the final.

Prior to the US Open, where she reached the third round for the first time with new partner Tereza Mihalíková, Nicolls reached a ranking of No. 57 on 19 August, making her the No. 1 British female doubles player.

Nicholls and Mihalíková reached back-to-back quarterfinals at the China Open and at the next WTA 1000, the Wuhan Open.

At the BJK Cup finals in November, Nicholls and Heather Watson lost to Mihalíková and Viktória Hrunčáková in the decisive doubles match as Great Britain were eliminated in the semifinals by Slovakia.

=== 2025: First WTA 500 title, Australian Open mixed doubles semifinal ===
Partnering Henry Patten, Nicholls reached the mixed doubles semifinals at the Australian Open, defeating top seeds Andrea Vavassori and Sara Errani in the second round and then Jackson Withrow and Irina Khromacheva in the quarterfinals. They lost to John-Patrick Smith and Kimberly Birrell in the last four.

In March, alongside Mihalíková, Nicholls made it through to her first WTA 1000 final at Indian Wells, overcoming fifth seeds Hsieh Su-wei and Zhang Shuai in the semifinals. Despite losing the championship match to Asia Muhammad and Demi Schuurs, she moved up to a career-high No. 31 in the WTA rankings.

In May, Nicholls and Mihalíková were runners-up at the WTA 125 Trophée Clarins, losing the final to Irina Khromacheva and Fanny Stollár.

Teaming up with Henry Patten, Nicholls reached the mixed doubles quarterfinals at the French Open, but pulled out at that stage due to a hand injury she had sustained.

Alongside Mihalíková, she won her first WTA 500 title at the Berlin Ladies Open in June, defeating top seeds Sara Errani and Jasmine Paolini in the final which went to a deciding champions tiebreak. As a result, she reached a new career-high of world No. 23, on 23 June 2025.

Nicholls ended 2025 ranked at world No. 26.

=== 2026: Queen's Club title ===
In February, Nicholls and Mihalíková reached the final at the Abu Dhabi Open, losing in a super tiebreak to Ekaterina Alexandrova and Maya Joint. They won their second title as a pairing at the Queen's Club Championships in June, defeating Leylah Fernandez and Laura Siegemund in the final. In August, Nicholls and Mihalíková made it through to the semifinals at the Canadian Open, losing to top seeds Kateřina Siniaková and Zhang Shuai.

== Performance timelines ==
Key
W	F	SF	QF	#R	RR	Q#	DNQ	A	NH

(W) winner; (F) finalist; (SF) semifinalist; (QF) quarterfinalist; (#R) rounds 4, 3, 2, 1; (RR) round-robin stage; (Q#) qualification round; (DNQ) did not qualify; (A) absent; (NH) not held; (SR) strike rate (events won / competed); (W–L) win–loss record.
To avoid confusion and double counting, these charts are updated at the conclusion of a tournament or when the player's participation has ended.

=== Doubles ===
Current through the 2024 Billie Jean King Cup finals.

Tournament	2018	2019	2020	2021	2022	2023	2024	SR	W–L	Win %
Grand Slam tournaments
Australian Open	A	A	A	A	A	1R	A	0 / 1	0–1	0%
French Open	A	A	A	A	A	1R	1R	0 / 2	0–2	0%
Wimbledon	Q1	A	NH	A	2R	1R	3R	0 / 3	3–3	50%
US Open	A	A	A	A	1R	A	3R	0 / 2	2–2	50%
Win–Loss	0–0	0–0	0–0	0–0	1–2	0–3	4–3	0 / 8	5–8	38%
National representation
Billie Jean King Cup	A	A	A	A	SF	QR	SF	0 / 2	3–2	60%
WTA 1000 tournaments
Canadian Open	A	A	NH	A	A	A	1R	0 / 1	0–1	0%
Cincinnati Open	A	A	A	A	A	A	QF	0 / 1	2–1	67%
China Open	A	A	NH			A	QF	0 / 1	2–1	67%
Wuhan Open	A	A	NH				QF	0 / 1	2–1	67%
Guadalajara Open	NH				A	1R	NTI	0 / 1	0–1	0%
Win–loss	0–0	0–0	0–0	0–0	0–0	0–1	6–4	0 / 5	6–5	55%
Career statistics
Tournaments	0	0	0	0	15	15	20	Career total: 50		
Titles	0	0	0	0	1	0	1	Career total: 2		
Finals	0	0	0	0	2	0	1	Career total: 3		
Overall win–loss	0–0	0–0	0–0	0–0	14–15	4–15	25–19	2 / 50	43–49	47%
Win %	–	–	–	–	48%	21%	57%	Career total: 47%		
Year-end ranking	273	362	324	187	63	107	39			

=== Mixed doubles ===
Tournament	2022	2023	2024	2025	2026	SR	W–L
Grand Slam tournaments
Australian Open	A	A	A	SF	1R	0 / 2	3–2
French Open	A	A	A	A	2R	0 / 1	1–1
Wimbledon	1R	SF	2R	1R	1R	0 / 5	4–5
US Open	A	A	A	A	A	0 / 0	0–0
Win–Loss	0–1	3–1	1–1	3–2	1–3	0 / 8	8–8

== WTA Tour finals ==
=== Doubles: 8 (4 titles, 4 runner-ups) ===
Legend WTA 1000 (0–1) WTA 500 (2–1) WTA 250 (2–2)	Finals by surface Hard (2–3) Grass (2–1)

Result	W–L	Date	Tournament	Tier	Surface	Partner	Opponents	Score
Loss	0–1	Mar 2022	Lyon Open, France	WTA 250	Hard (i)	(United Kingdom) Alicia Barnett	(Germany) Laura Siegemund; Vera Zvonareva	5–7, 1–6
Win	1–1	Aug 2022	Championnats de Granby, Canada	WTA 250	Hard	(United Kingdom) Alicia Barnett	(United Kingdom) Harriet Dart (Netherlands) Rosalie van der Hoek	5–7, 6–3, [10–1]
Win	2–1	Mar 2024	ATX Open, United States	WTA 250	Hard	(Australia) Olivia Gadecki	(Poland) Katarzyna Kawa (Netherlands) Bibiane Schoofs	6–2, 6–4
Loss	2–2	Jun 2024	Rosmalen Championships, Netherlands	WTA 250	Grass	(Slovakia) Tereza Mihalíková	(Estonia) Ingrid Neel (Netherlands) Bibiane Schoofs	6–7^{(6–8)}, 3–6
Loss	2–3	Mar 2025	Indian Wells Open, United States	WTA 1000	Hard	(Slovakia) Tereza Mihalíková	(United States) Asia Muhammad (Netherlands) Demi Schuurs	2–6, 6–7^{(4–7)}
Win	3–3	Jun 2025	Berlin Tennis Open, Germany	WTA 500	Grass	(Slovakia) Tereza Mihalíková	(Italy) Sara Errani (Italy) Jasmine Paolini	4–6, 6–2, [10–6]
Loss	3–4	Feb 2026	Abu Dhabi Open, United Arab Emirates	WTA 500	Hard	(Slovakia) Tereza Mihalíková	Ekaterina Alexandrova (Australia) Maya Joint	6–3, 6–7^{(5–7)}, [8–10]
Win	4–4	Jun 2026	Queen's Club Championships, England	WTA 500	Grass	(Slovakia) Tereza Mihalíková	(Canada) Leylah Fernandez (Germany) Laura Siegemund	6–3, 6–7^{(4–7)}, [10–5]

== WTA 125 finals ==
=== Doubles: 4 (1 title, 3 runner-ups) ===
Result	W–L	Date	Tournament	Surface	Partner	Opponents	Score
Loss	0–1	Dec 2022	Open de Limoges, France	Hard (i)	(United Kingdom) Alicia Barnett	(Georgia (country)) Oksana Kalashnikova (Ukraine) Marta Kostyuk	5–7, 1–6
Win	1–1	Mar 2024	Charleston Pro, United States	Hard	(Australia) Olivia Gadecki	(Italy) Sara Errani (Slovakia) Tereza Mihalíková	6–2, 6–1
Loss	1–2	May 2025	Clarins Open, France	Clay	(Slovakia) Tereza Mihalíková	(Russia) Irina Khromacheva (Hungary) Fanny Stollár	6–4, 6–7^{(5)}, [5–10]
Loss	1–3	Apr 2026	Catalonia Open, Spain	Clay	(Slovakia) Tereza Mihalíková	Elena Pridankina (China) Tang Qianhui	1–6, 3–6

== ITF Circuit finals ==
=== Doubles: 39 (19 titles, 20 runner-ups) ===
Legend
W100 tournaments (2–3)
W60/75 tournaments (3–6)
W25 tournaments (6–7)
W10/15 tournaments (8–4)

Result	W–L	Date	Tournament	Tier	Surface	Partner	Opponents	Score
Win	1–0	Nov 2015	GB Pro-Series Bath, United Kingdom	W25	Hard (i)	(United Kingdom) Sarah Beth Grey	(United Kingdom) Freya Christie (United Kingdom) Lisa Whybourn	1–6, 6–4, [10–2]
Win	2–0	Feb 2016	ITF Wirral, UK	W10	Hard (i)	(United Kingdom) Sarah Beth Grey	(United States) Veronica Corning (United Kingdom) Harriet Dart	6–2, 1–6, [10–8]
Win	3–0	Sep 2016	ITF Nottingham, UK	W10	Hard (i)	(United Kingdom) Sarah Beth Grey	(United States) Dasha Ivanova (France) Margot Yerolymos	6–2, 1–6, [10–8]
Loss	3–1	Oct 2016	ITF Loughborough, UK	W10	Hard (i)	(United Kingdom) Sarah Beth Grey	(United States) Dasha Ivanova (Czech Republic) Petra Krejsová	6–7^{(2–7)}, 6–7^{(2–7)}
Win	4–1	Nov 2016	ITF Sheffield, UK	W10	Hard (i)	(United Kingdom) Sarah Beth Grey	(Finland) Mia Eklund (Belarus) Nika Shytkouskaya	7–6^{(7–3)}, 7–5
Win	5–1	Nov 2016	GB Pro-Series Shrewsbury, United Kingdom	W10	Hard (i)	(United Kingdom) Sarah Beth Grey	(United Kingdom) Alicia Barnett (United Kingdom) Lauren McMinn	6–3, 6–3
Win	6–1	Feb 2017	ITF Birmingham, UK	W15	Hard (i)	(United Kingdom) Sarah Beth Grey	(Norway) Melanie Stokke (Germany) Julia Wachaczyk	6–3, 5–7, [10–7]
Loss	6–2	Apr 2017	ITF Óbidos, Portugal	W15	Carpet	(United Kingdom) Laura Sainsbury	(Germany) Anna Klasen (Netherlands) Erika Vogelsang	4–6, 1–6
Loss	6–3	May 2017	ITF Hammamet, Tunisia	W15	Clay	(United Kingdom) Sarah Beth Grey	(Italy) Gaia Sanesi (Italy) Martina Spigarelli	0–6, 2–6
Win	7–3	Sep 2017	ITF Madrid, Spain	W15	Hard	(United Kingdom) Alicia Barnett	(Spain) Marina Bassols Ribera (Spain) Júlia Payola	6–1, 6–2
Loss	7–4	Sep 2017	ITF Clermont-Ferrand, France	W25	Hard (i)	(United Kingdom) Sarah Beth Grey	(Sweden) Cornelia Lister (Belarus) Vera Lapko	4–6, 3–6
Win	8–4	Mar 2018	ITF Ramat Hasharon, Israel	W15	Hard	(United Kingdom) Alicia Barnett	(Ecuador) Charlotte Römer (Germany) Caroline Werner	6–4, 7–6
Win	9–4	Mar 2018	ITF Tel Aviv, Israel	W15	Hard	(United Kingdom) Alicia Barnett	(France) Mathilde Armitano (France) Elixane Lechemia	7–6, 6–3
Win	10–4	Apr 2018	ITF Óbidos, Portugal	W25	Carpet	(United Kingdom) Sarah Beth Grey	(Belgium) An-Sophie Mestach (Serbia) Nina Stojanović	4–6, 7–6^{(7–4)}, [10–6]
Win	11–4	Apr 2018	ITF Óbidos, Portugal	W25	Carpet	(United Kingdom) Sarah Beth Grey	(France) Jessika Ponchet (Ukraine) Ganna Poznikhirenko	6–2, 6–1
Loss	11–5	May 2018	ITF Monzón, Spain	W25	Hard	(United Kingdom) Sarah Beth Grey	(Spain) Cristina Bucșa (Russia) Yana Sizikova	2–6, 7–5, [8–10]
Loss	11–6	Aug 2018	ITF Chiswick, UK	W25	Hard	(United Kingdom) Sarah Beth Grey	(United Kingdom) Freya Christie (United Kingdom) Samantha Murray	6–3, 5–7, [8–10]
Loss	11–7	Nov 2018	ITF Wirral, UK	W25	Hard (i)	(United Kingdom) Sarah Beth Grey	(United Kingdom) Freya Christie (Russia) Valeria Savinykh	4–6, 5–7
Win	12–7	Nov 2018	GB Pro-Series Shrewsbury, United Kingdom	W25	Hard (i)	(United Kingdom) Sarah Beth Grey	(Germany) Tayisiya Morderger (Germany) Yana Morderger	0–6, 6–3, [10–4]
Loss	12–8	Mar 2019	Torneig Els Gorchs, Spain	W60	Hard	(United Kingdom) Jodie Burrage	(France) Jessika Ponchet (United Kingdom) Eden Silva	3–6, 4–6
Win	13–8	Mar 2020	ITF Sunderland, UK	W25	Hard (i)	(United Kingdom) Alicia Barnett	(Spain) Celia Cervino Ruiz (Spain) Maria Gutierrez Carrasco	6–4, 7–6
Loss	13–9	Sep 2020	ITF Montemor-o-Novo, Portugal	W25	Hard	(United Kingdom) Jodie Burrage	(Spain) Marina Bassols Ribera (Romania) Ioana Loredana Roșca	6–7^{(5–7)}, 6–4, [6–10]
Loss	13–10	May 2021	ITF Santa Margarida, Spain	W15	Hard	(Spain) Celia Cerviño Ruiz	(Argentina) Victoria Bosio (Lithuania) Justina Mikulskytė	6–4, 1–6, [7–10]
Win	14–10	Jun 2021	ITF Figueira da Foz, Portugal	W25	Hard	(United Kingdom) Alicia Barnett	(Turkey) Berfu Cengiz (Russia) Anastasia Tikhonova	6–3, 7–6
Loss	14–11	Jul 2021	Open Araba en Femenino, Spain	W60	Hard	(Spain) Celia Cerviño Ruiz	(Australia) Olivia Gadecki (Spain) Rebeka Masarova	3–6, 3–6
Loss	14–12	Sep 2021	Caldas da Rainha Open, Portugal	W60	Hard	(United Kingdom) Alicia Barnett	(Japan) Momoko Kobori (Japan) Hiroko Kuwata	6–7, 6–7
Loss	14–13	Sep 2021	ITF Santarem, Portugal	W25	Hard	(United Kingdom) Alicia Barnett	(Belgium) Marie Benoît (United Kingdom) Eden Silva	5–7, 1–6
Loss	14–14	Nov 2021	Open Nantes Atlantique, France	W60	Hard (i)	(United Kingdom) Alicia Barnett	(United Kingdom) Samantha Murray (France) Jessika Ponchet	4–6, 2–6
Loss	14–15	Dec 2021	ITF Selva Gardena, Italy	W25	Hard (i)	(United Kingdom) Alicia Barnett	(Hong Kong) Eudice Chong (Japan) Moyuka Uchijima	2–6, 1–6
Loss	14–16	Jan 2022	Open Andrézieux-Bouthéon, France	W60	Hard (i)	(United Kingdom) Alicia Barnett	(France) Estelle Cascino (France) Jessika Ponchet	4–6, 1–6
Loss	14–17	Feb 2022	Grenoble Open, France	W60	Hard (i)	(United Kingdom) Alicia Barnett	(India) Prarthana Thombare (Japan) Yuriko Miyazaki	3–6, 3–6
Win	15–17	Apr 2022	Bellinzona Ladies Open, Switzerland	W60	Clay	(United Kingdom) Alicia Barnett	(Switzerland) Xenia Knoll (Russia) Oksana Selekhmeteva	6–7^{(7–9)}, 6–4, [10–7]
Loss	15–18	May 2022	Solgironès Open, Spain	W100	Clay	(United Kingdom) Alicia Barnett	(Andorra) Victoria Jiménez Kasintseva (Mexico) Renata Zarazúa	4–6, 6–2, [8–10]
Win	16–18	Aug 2022	Kozerki Open, Poland	W100	Hard	(United Kingdom) Alicia Barnett	(Poland) Katarzyna Kawa (Germany) Vivian Heisen	6–1, 7–6^{(7–3)}
Win	17–18	Mar 2023	Trnava Indoor, Slovakia	W60	Hard (i)	(United Kingdom) Alicia Barnett	(Russia) Amina Anshba (Czech Republic) Anastasia Dețiuc	6–3, 6–3
Loss	17–19	Jun 2023	Surbiton Trophy, UK	W100	Grass	(United Kingdom) Alicia Barnett	(Belgium) Yanina Wickmayer (United States) Sophie Chang	4–6, 1–6
Win	18–19	Jul 2023	Open Araba en Femenino, Spain	W100	Hard	(United Kingdom) Alicia Barnett	(France) Estelle Cascino (Latvia) Diāna Marcinkēviča	6–3, 6–4
Loss	18–20	Sep 2023	Tokyo Open, Japan	W100	Hard	(United Kingdom) Alicia Barnett	(France) Jessika Ponchet (Netherlands) Bibiane Schoofs	6–4, 1–6, [7–10]
Win	19–20	Jan 2024	Porto Indoor, Portugal	W75+H	Hard (i)	(United Kingdom) Sarah Beth Grey	(Portugal) Francisca Jorge (Portugal) Matilde Jorge	4–6, 6–3, [10–6]
