= 2026 Nottingham Open =

- Date: 14–21 June
- Edition: 11th (women); 30th (men)
- Category: WTA 250 (women); ATP Challenger Tour 125 (men)
- Draw: 32S / 16D
- Surface: Grass
- Location: Nottingham, United Kingdom
- Venue: Nottingham Tennis Centre

Champions

Men's singles
- (Australia) Christopher O'Connell

Women's singles
- (Czech Republic) Marie Bouzková

Men's doubles
- (Brazil) Fernando Romboli / (United States) Theodore Winegar

Women's doubles
- (United Kingdom) Harriet Dart / (United Kingdom) Maia Lumsden
- Nottingham Open

The 2026 Nottingham Open (also known as the Lexus Nottingham Open for sponsorship purposes) was a professional tennis tournament played on outdoor grass courts. It was the 11th edition of the event for women and the 30th edition for men. It was classified as a WTA 250 tournament on the 2026 WTA Tour for the women and as a 2026 ATP Challenger Tour event for the men. The event took place at the Nottingham Tennis Centre in Nottingham, United Kingdom from 14 to 21 June 2026.

== Champions ==
=== Men's singles ===
- (Australia) Christopher O'Connell def. (Finland) Otto Virtanen 7–6^{(7–3)}, 7–6^{(8–6)}.

=== Women's singles ===
- (Czech Republic) Marie Bouzková def. (United States) Emma Navarro, 7–6^{(7–5)}, 4–6, 6–2

=== Men's doubles ===
- (Brazil) Fernando Romboli / (United States) Theodore Winegar def. (United States) Mac Kiger / (United States) Reese Stalder 6–3, 6–4.

=== Women's doubles ===
- (United Kingdom) Harriet Dart / (United Kingdom) Maia Lumsden def. (Japan) Shuko Aoyama / (Chinese Taipei) Chan Hao-ching, 6–3, 6–4

== ATP singles main-draw entrants ==
=== Seeds ===
Country	Player	Rank^{1}	Seed
POR	Jaime Faria	94	1
FRA	Benjamin Bonzi	99	2
CHN	Wu Yibing	101	3
HKG	Coleman Wong	108	4
FRA	Hugo Gaston	119	5
POR	Henrique Rocha	121	6
NOR	Nicolai Budkov Kjær	122	7
~~AUS~~	~~Tristan Schoolkate~~	~~123~~	~~8~~

- ^{1} Rankings are as of 8 June 2026.

=== Other entrants ===
The following players received wildcards into the main draw:

- (United Kingdom) Felix Gill
- (United Kingdom) Billy Harris
- (United Kingdom) Oliver Tarvet

The following players received entry into the singles main draw as special exempts:

- (United States) Tristan Boyer
- (China) ~~Bu Yunchaokete~~

The following player received entry into the singles main draw through the Next Gen Accelerator programme:

- (United States) Darwin Blanch

The following players received entry from the qualifying draw:

- (Switzerland) Rémy Bertola
- (United Kingdom) Jay Clarke
- (United Kingdom) Alastair Gray
- (United Kingdom) Anton Matusevich
- (Italy) Luca Nardi
- (China) Zhang Zhizhen

The following players received entry as lucky losers:

- (Denmark) August Holmgren
- (South Korea) Kwon Soon-woo

== WTA singles main-draw entrants ==
=== Seeds ===
Country	Player	Rank^{1}	Seed
~~USA~~	~~Iva Jovic~~	~~19~~	~~1~~
CAN	Leylah Fernandez	23	2
USA	Emma Navarro	25	3
CZE	Marie Bouzková	28	4
USA	Ann Li	29	5
LAT	Jeļena Ostapenko	36	6
~~ROU~~	~~Jaqueline Cristian~~	~~38~~	~~7~~
USA	McCartney Kessler	39	8
INA	Janice Tjen	40	9
~~GBR~~	~~Emma Raducanu~~	~~42~~	~~10~~
CZE	Sara Bejlek	47	11

- ^{1} Rankings are as of 8 June 2026.

=== Other entrants ===
The following players received wildcards into the main draw:

- ~~(United Kingdom) Katie Boulter~~
- (United Kingdom) Harriet Dart
- (United Kingdom) Francesca Jones
- ~~(United Kingdom) Emma Raducanu~~

The following player received entry using a protected ranking:

- (Czech Republic) Karolína Plíšková

The following player received entry as a special exempt:

- (United States) Caty McNally

The following players received entry from the qualifying draw:

- Anna Blinkova
- (Switzerland) Viktorija Golubic
- (Croatia) Antonia Ružić
- (Japan) Himeno Sakatsume
- (Turkey) Zeynep Sönmez
- (United States) Katie Volynets

The following players received entry as lucky losers:

- (Australia) Kimberly Birrell
- (Hungary) Anna Bondár
- (United Kingdom) Alicia Dudeney
- (United States) Sofia Kenin
- (United Kingdom) Hannah Klugman
- (Australia) Taylah Preston

=== Withdrawals ===
- (France) Loïs Boisson → replaced by (United Kingdom) Alicia Dudeney
- (United Kingdom) Katie Boulter → replaced by (United Kingdom) Hannah Klugman
- (Italy) Elisabetta Cocciaretto → replaced by (Ukraine) Yuliia Starodubtseva
- (Romania) Jaqueline Cristian → replaced by (United States) Sofia Kenin
- (United States) Iva Jovic → replaced by (Australia) Taylah Preston
- (Czech Republic) Barbora Krejčíková → replaced by (Australia) Kimberly Birrell
- (United Kingdom) Emma Raducanu → replaced by (Hungary) Anna Bondár

== WTA doubles main-draw entrants ==
=== Seeds ===
Country	Player	Country	Player	Rank^{1}	Seed
AUS	Storm Hunter	USA	Caty McNally	64	1
JPN	Shuko Aoyama	TPE	Chan Hao-ching	78	2
INA	Aldila Sutjiadi	INA	Janice Tjen	89	3
CZE	Marie Bouzková		Alexandra Panova	91	4

- ^{1} Rankings are as of 8 June 2026.

=== Other entrants ===
The following pairs received wildcards into the doubles main draw:

- (United Kingdom) Harriet Dart / (United Kingdom) Maia Lumsden
- (United Kingdom) Alicia Dudeney / (United Kingdom) Mimi Xu

The following pair received entry as alternates:

- (Canada) Leylah Fernandez / (Ukraine) Yuliia Starodubtseva

=== Withdrawals ===
- (Australia) Maya Joint / (United States) Iva Jovic → replaced by (Canada) Leylah Fernandez / (Ukraine) Yuliia Starodubtseva
