= 2026 Nottingham Open – Women's doubles =

Women's doubles
- 2026 Nottingham Open

Final
- Champions: (United Kingdom) Harriet Dart (United Kingdom) Maia Lumsden
- Runners-up: (Japan) Shuko Aoyama (Chinese Taipei) Chan Hao-ching
- Score: 6−3, 6−4

Events
Singles	men	women
Doubles	men	women
- Nottingham Open

Harriet Dart and Maia Lumsden defeated Shuko Aoyama and Chan Hao-ching in the final, 6–3, 6–4 to win the women's doubles tennis title at the 2026 Nottingham Open. It was both Dart and Lumsden's first career WTA Tour doubles title.

Beatriz Haddad Maia and Laura Siegemund were the reigning champions, but did not participate this year.

== Seeds ==
1. (Australia) Storm Hunter / (United States) Caty McNally (quarterfinals)
2. (Japan) Shuko Aoyama / (Chinese Taipei) Chan Hao-ching (final)
3. (Indonesia) Aldila Sutjiadi / (Indonesia) Janice Tjen (semifinals)
4. (Czech Republic) Marie Bouzková / Alexandra Panova (quarterfinals)

== Draw ==
Key

- Q = Qualifier
- WC = Wild card
- LL = Lucky loser
- Alt = Alternate
- ITF = ITF entry
- PR = Protected ranking
- SR = Special ranking
- SE = Special exempt
- JE = Junior exempt
- JR = Junior Accelerator Programme entrant
- CO = College Accelerator Programme entrant
- NG = Next Gen Accelerator Program entrant
- w/o = Walkover
- r = Retired
- d = Defaulted

=== Draw ===
First round
1	(Australia) S Hunter (United States) C McNally	6	6
WC	(United Kingdom) A Dudeney (United Kingdom) M Xu	3	4
WC	(United Kingdom) H Dart (United Kingdom) M Lumsden	3	6	[10]
PR	(Croatia) D Jurak Schreiber (Croatia) A Ružić	6	2	[2]
3	(Indonesia) A Sutjiadi (Indonesia) J Tjen	6	6
(United States) A Li (Czech Republic) T Valentová	4	4
(Japan) M Kato (Japan) M Ninomiya	3	0
(Czech Republic) J Malečková (Czech Republic) M Škoch	6	6
M Kozyreva; I Shymanovich	6	1	[10]
E Pridankina (China) Q Tang	4	6	[8]
PR	(Chile) A Guarachi (Poland) A Rosolska	0	2
4	(Czech Republic) M Bouzková; A Panova	6	6
Alt	(Canada) L Fernandez (Ukraine) Y Starodubtseva	6	6
(Japan) E Hozumi (Chinese Taipei) F-h Wu	0	2
(Hong Kong) E Chong (Belgium) M Kempen	6	4	[6]
2	(Japan) S Aoyama (Chinese Taipei) H-c Chan	4	6	[10]

Quarterfinals
1	(Australia) S Hunter (United States) C McNally	5	2
WC	(United Kingdom) H Dart (United Kingdom) M Lumsden	7	6
3	(Indonesia) A Sutjiadi (Indonesia) J Tjen	6	6
(Czech Republic) J Malečková (Czech Republic) M Škoch	1	2
M Kozyreva; I Shymanovich	7^{9}	5	[12]
4	(Czech Republic) M Bouzková; A Panova	6^{7}	7	[10]
Alt	(Canada) L Fernandez (Ukraine) Y Starodubtseva	6	6^{5}	[3]
2	(Japan) S Aoyama (Chinese Taipei) H-c Chan	4	7^{7}	[10]

Semifinals
WC	(United Kingdom) H Dart (United Kingdom) M Lumsden	4	6	[10]
3	(Indonesia) A Sutjiadi (Indonesia) J Tjen	6	4	[6]
M Kozyreva; I Shymanovich	7	1	[8]
2	(Japan) S Aoyama (Chinese Taipei) H-c Chan	5	6	[10]

Final
WC	(United Kingdom) H Dart (United Kingdom) M Lumsden	6	6
2	(Japan) S Aoyama (Chinese Taipei) H-c Chan	3	4
