= 2026 Nottingham Open – Women's singles =

Women's singles
- 2026 Nottingham Open

Final
- Champion: (Czech Republic) Marie Bouzková
- Runner-up: (United States) Emma Navarro
- Score: 7–6^{(7–5)}, 4–6, 6–2

Details
- Draw: 32 (6 Q / 4 WC )
- Seeds: 8

Events
Singles	men	women
Doubles	men	women
- Nottingham Open

Marie Bouzková defeated Emma Navarro in the final, 7–6^{(7–5)}, 4–6, 6–2 to win the women's singles tennis title at the 2026 Nottingham Open. It was her fourth WTA Tour title, and first on grass courts.

McCartney Kessler was the defending champion, but lost in the first round to Katie Volynets.

== Seeds ==
1. (United States) Iva Jovic (withdrew)
2. (Canada) Leylah Fernandez (first round)
3. (United States) Emma Navarro (final)
4. (Czech Republic) Marie Bouzková (champion)
5. (United States) Ann Li (quarterfinals)
6. (Greece) Maria Sakkari (first round)
7. (Romania) Jaqueline Cristian (withdrew)
8. (United States) McCartney Kessler (first round)
9. (Indonesia) Janice Tjen (first round)
10. (United Kingdom) Emma Raducanu (withdrew)
11. (Czech Republic) Sára Bejlek (first round)

== Draw ==
Key

- Q = Qualifier
- WC = Wild card
- LL = Lucky loser
- Alt = Alternate
- ITF = ITF entry
- PR = Protected ranking
- SR = Special ranking
- SE = Special exempt
- JE = Junior exempt
- JR = Junior Accelerator Programme entrant
- CO = College Accelerator Programme entrant
- NG = Next Gen Accelerator Program entrant
- w/o = Walkover
- r = Retired
- d = Defaulted

=== Finals ===
Semifinals
SR	(Czech Republic) Karolína Plíšková	4	1
4	(Czech Republic) Marie Bouzková	6	6
3	(United States) Emma Navarro	7^{7}	6
Q	(Switzerland) Viktorija Golubic	6^{5}	2

Final
4	(Czech Republic) Marie Bouzková	7^{7}	4	6
3	(United States) Emma Navarro	6^{5}	6	2

=== Top half ===
First round
11	(Czech Republic) S Bejlek	6	6^{3}	2
SR	(Czech Republic) Ka Plíšková	2	7^{7}	6
SE	(United States) C McNally	6	6
Q	(Croatia) A Ružić	3	0
(Australia) T Gibson	6	5	7^{7}
WC	(United Kingdom) F Jones	3	7	6^{4}
(China) Q Zheng	4	7^{7}	6
6	(Greece) M Sakkari	6	6^{1}	4
4	(Czech Republic) M Bouzková	6	6
(Czech Republic) T Valentová	3	3
WC	(United Kingdom) H Dart	2	4
LL	(United Kingdom) H Klugman	6	6
LL	(United Kingdom) A Dudeney	4	6^{2}
(Ukraine) D Yastremska	6	7^{7}
(Germany) T Maria	6	6
9	(Indonesia) J Tjen	3	2

Second round
SR	(Czech Republic) Ka Plíšková	6	7^{7}
SE	(United States) C McNally	4	6^{3}
(Australia) T Gibson	6	7^{12}
(China) Q Zheng	3	6^{10}
4	(Czech Republic) M Bouzková	7	6
LL	(United Kingdom) H Klugman	5	2
(Ukraine) D Yastremska	1	2
(Germany) T Maria	6	6

Quarterfinals
SR	(Czech Republic) Ka Plíšková	7	6
(Australia) T Gibson	5	4
4	(Czech Republic) M Bouzková	7	6
(Germany) T Maria	5	0

Semifinals
SR	(Czech Republic) Ka Plíšková	4	1
4	(Czech Republic) M Bouzková	6	6

=== Bottom half ===
First round
8	(United States) M Kessler	3	3
Q	(United States) K Volynets	6	6
Q	(Japan) H Sakatsume	5	2
(Spain) J Bouzas Maneiro	7	6
(Australia) M Joint	7^{10}	5	4
(Ukraine) Y Starodubtseva	6^{8}	7	6
LL	(Hungary) A Bondár	7^{8}	3	2
3	(United States) E Navarro	6^{6}	6	6
5	(United States) A Li	4	7^{7}	6
LL	(Australia) K Birrell	6	6^{3}	4
Q	A Blinkova	6	3	3
LL	(Australia) T Preston	4	6	6
Q	(Switzerland) V Golubic	6	4	6
LL	(United States) S Kenin	2	6	3
Q	(Turkey) Z Sönmez	6	7^{7}
2	(Canada) L Fernandez	4	6^{1}

Second round
Q	(United States) K Volynets	5	0^{r}
(Spain) J Bouzas Maneiro	7	1
(Ukraine) Y Starodubtseva	4	7^{7}	4
3	(United States) E Navarro	6	6^{3}	6
5	(United States) A Li	5	6	6
LL	(Australia) T Preston	7	2	2
Q	(Switzerland) V Golubic	7	4	6
Q	(Turkey) Z Sönmez	5	6	4

Quarterfinals
(Spain) J Bouzas Maneiro	6^{6}	2
3	(United States) E Navarro	7^{8}	6
5	(United States) A Li	3	6	3
Q	(Switzerland) V Golubic	6	2	6

Semifinals
3	(United States) E Navarro	7^{7}	6
Q	(Switzerland) V Golubic	6^{5}	2

== Qualifying ==
=== Seeds ===
1. (Croatia) Antonia Ružić (qualified)
2. (United States) Caty McNally (special exempt into main draw)
3. (Hungary) Panna Udvardy (first round)
4. (Australia) Daria Kasatkina (first round)
5. (Turkey) Zeynep Sönmez (qualified)
6. (Switzerland) Viktorija Golubic (qualified)
7. (Australia) Kimberly Birrell (qualifying competition, lucky loser)
8. (Hungary) Anna Bondár (qualifying competition, lucky loser)
9. (Uzbekistan) Kamilla Rakhimova (withdrew, still competing at Queen's)
10. (France) Elsa Jacquemot (first round)
11. Anastasia Zakharova (first round)
12. (Kazakhstan) Yulia Putintseva (first round)

=== Qualifiers ===
1. (Croatia) Antonia Ružić
2. (Japan) Himeno Sakatsume
3. (United States) Katie Volynets
4. Anna Blinkova
5. (Turkey) Zeynep Sönmez
6. (Switzerland) Viktorija Golubic

=== Lucky losers ===
1. (Australia) Kimberly Birrell
2. (Australia) Taylah Preston
3. (United States) Sofia Kenin
4. (Hungary) Anna Bondár
5. (United Kingdom) Alicia Dudeney
6. (United Kingdom) Hannah Klugman

=== Qualifying draw ===
==== First qualifier ====
First round
1	(Croatia) Antonia Ružić	6	6
(Slovenia) Kaja Juvan	3	4
(Spain) Oksana Selekhmeteva	4	3
Alt	(Australia) Taylah Preston	6	6

Qualifying competition
1	(Croatia) Antonia Ružić	6	6^{6}	7
Alt	(Australia) Taylah Preston	3	7^{8}	5

==== Second qualifier ====
First round
Alt	(Japan) Himeno Sakatsume	6	7^{7}
WC	(United Kingdom) Mika Stojsavljevic	2	6^{2}
WC	(United Kingdom) Alicia Dudeney	6	6
12	(Kazakhstan) Yulia Putintseva	1	3

Qualifying competition
Alt	(Japan) Himeno Sakatsume	6	6
WC	(United Kingdom) Alicia Dudeney	3	3

==== Third qualifier ====
First round
3	(Hungary) Panna Udvardy	5	2
(United States) Katie Volynets	7	6
WC	(United Kingdom) Mimi Xu	2	3
7	(Australia) Kimberly Birrell	6	6

Qualifying competition
(United States) Katie Volynets	2	6	7^{7}
7	(Australia) Kimberly Birrell	6	4	6^{3}

==== Fourth qualifier ====
First round
4	(Australia) Daria Kasatkina	3	2
Anna Blinkova	6	6
(Colombia) Emiliana Arango	3	4
8	(Hungary) Anna Bondár	6	6

Qualifying competition
Anna Blinkova	5	6	6
8	(Hungary) Anna Bondár	7	2	2

==== Fifth qualifier ====
First round
5	(Turkey) Zeynep Sönmez	6	6
(Thailand) Lanlana Tararudee	4	0
WC	(United Kingdom) Hannah Klugman	7^{7}	6
11	Anastasia Zakharova	6^{5}	2

Qualifying competition
5	(Turkey) Zeynep Sönmez	6	6
WC	(United Kingdom) Hannah Klugman	2	4

==== Sixth qualifier ====
First round
6	(Switzerland) Viktorija Golubic	5	7	6
(Slovenia) Veronika Erjavec	7	5	4
(United States) Sofia Kenin	6	6
10	(France) Elsa Jacquemot	4	4

Qualifying competition
6	(Switzerland) Viktorija Golubic	6	6
(United States) Sofia Kenin	3	4
