= 2026 Wimbledon Championships – Women's doubles =

Tennis championship

Women's doubles
- 2026 Wimbledon Championships

Final
- Champions: (China) Guo Hanyu (France) Kristina Mladenovic
- Runners-up: (Canada) Gabriela Dabrowski (Brazil) Luisa Stefani
- Score: 6–3, 7–5
- Date: 12 July 2026

Details
- Draw: 64
- Seeds: 16

Events
Singles	men	women		boys	girls
Doubles	men	women	mixed	boys	girls
WC Singles	men	women	quad
WC Doubles	men	women	quad
14&U Singles	boys	girls
Legends	men	women	mixed
- Wimbledon Championships

Guo Hanyu and Kristina Mladenovic defeated Gabriela Dabrowski and Luisa Stefani in the final, 6–3, 7–5 to win the ladies' doubles tennis title at the 2026 Wimbledon Championships. It was Guo's first major title and Mladenovic's seventh in women's doubles (tenth overall).

Veronika Kudermetova and Elise Mertens were the reigning champions, but Kudermetova did not participate this year. Mertens partnered Zhang Shuai, but they lost in the second round to Hsieh Su-wei and Wang Xinyu.

== Seeds ==
1. (Czech Republic) Kateřina Siniaková / (United States) Taylor Townsend (quarterfinals)
2. (Canada) Gabriela Dabrowski / (Brazil) Luisa Stefani (final)
3. (Kazakhstan) Anna Danilina / (Serbia) Aleksandra Krunić (third round)
4. (Belgium) Elise Mertens / (China) Zhang Shuai (second round)
5. (United States) Nicole Melichar-Martinez / (New Zealand) Erin Routliffe (first round)
6. (Italy) Sara Errani / (Italy) Jasmine Paolini (withdrew)
7. (Germany) Laura Siegemund / Vera Zvonareva (third round)
8. (United States) Sofia Kenin / (Latvia) Jeļena Ostapenko (second round)
9. (Australia) Ellen Perez / (Netherlands) Demi Schuurs (quarterfinals)
10. (China) Guo Hanyu / (France) Kristina Mladenovic (champions)
11. (Ukraine) Lyudmyla Kichenok / (United States) Desirae Krawczyk (second round)
12. (Slovakia) Tereza Mihalíková / (United Kingdom) Olivia Nicholls (first round)
13. (Japan) Shuko Aoyama / (Chinese Taipei) Liang En-shuo (semifinals)
14. (Australia) Storm Hunter / (United States) Caty McNally (third round)
15. (Norway) Ulrikke Eikeri / (United States) Quinn Gleason (second round)
16. (United States) Asia Muhammad / (Hungary) Fanny Stollár (third round)

Click on the seed number of a player to go to their draw section.

== Draw ==
Key

- Q = Qualifier
- WC = Wild card
- LL = Lucky loser
- Alt = Alternate
- ITF = ITF entry
- PR = Protected ranking
- SR = Special ranking
- SE = Special exempt
- JE = Junior exempt
- JR = Junior Accelerator Programme entrant
- CO = College Accelerator Programme entrant
- NG = Next Gen Accelerator Program entrant
- w/o = Walkover
- r = Retired
- d = Defaulted

=== Finals ===
Quarterfinals
1	(Czech Republic) Kateřina Siniaková (United States) Taylor Townsend	6^{8}	5
10	(China) Guo Hanyu (France) Kristina Mladenovic	7^{10}	7
PR	(Estonia) Ingrid Neel (Mexico) Giuliana Olmos	1	6	4
(China) Jiang Xinyu (China) Xu Yifan	6	2	6
9	(Australia) Ellen Perez (Netherlands) Demi Schuurs	4	4
13	(Japan) Shuko Aoyama (Chinese Taipei) Liang En-shuo	6	6
(Poland) Katarzyna Piter (Czech Republic) Anna Sisková	1	2
2	(Canada) Gabriela Dabrowski (Brazil) Luisa Stefani	6	6

Semifinals
10	(China) Guo Hanyu (France) Kristina Mladenovic	7^{7}	6
(China) Jiang Xinyu (China) Xu Yifan	6^{5}	4
13	(Japan) Shuko Aoyama (Chinese Taipei) Liang En-shuo	5	3
2	(Canada) Gabriela Dabrowski (Brazil) Luisa Stefani	7	6

Final
10	(China) Guo Hanyu (France) Kristina Mladenovic	6	7
2	(Canada) Gabriela Dabrowski (Brazil) Luisa Stefani	3	5

=== Top half ===
==== Section 1 ====
First round
1	(Czech Republic) K Siniaková (United States) T Townsend	6	6
(Chinese Taipei) H-c Chan (Denmark) C Tauson	4	0
(Austria) A Potapova (Austria) L Tagger	2	0
PR	(Czech Republic) M Bouzková (Spain) S Sorribes Tormo	6	6
(Ukraine) Y Starodubtseva (United States) P Stearns	6	4	6
(Netherlands) I Haverlag (Hungary) P Udvardy	4	6	4
(Ukraine) N Kichenok (Japan) M Ninomiya	5	2
16	(United States) A Muhammad (Hungary) F Stollár	7	6
10	(China) H Guo (France) K Mladenovic	6	7
WC	(United Kingdom) J Burrage (United Kingdom) M Stojsavljevic	3	5
E Alexandrova (Australia) M Joint	6	6
(Slovenia) V Erjavec (Croatia) P Marčinko	2	4
(United States) M Kessler; D Shnaider	6^{2}	6	2
(Czech Republic) A Dețiuc; I Khromacheva	7^{7}	4	6
(Czech Republic) N Bartůňková (Philippines) A Eala	6	3	1
8	(United States) S Kenin (Latvia) J Ostapenko	3	6	6

Second round
1	(Czech Republic) K Siniaková (United States) T Townsend	6	6
PR	(Czech Republic) M Bouzková (Spain) S Sorribes Tormo	2	1
(Ukraine) Y Starodubtseva (United States) P Stearns	1	4
16	(United States) A Muhammad (Hungary) F Stollár	6	6
10	(China) H Guo (France) K Mladenovic	6	6
E Alexandrova (Australia) M Joint	2	3
(Czech Republic) A Dețiuc; I Khromacheva	3	7	6
8	(United States) S Kenin (Latvia) J Ostapenko	6	5	4

Third round
1	(Czech Republic) K Siniaková (United States) T Townsend	6	6
16	(United States) A Muhammad (Hungary) F Stollár	3	3
10	(China) H Guo (France) K Mladenovic	4	7^{7}	6
(Czech Republic) A Dețiuc; I Khromacheva	6	6^{5}	3

Quarterfinals
1	(Czech Republic) K Siniaková (United States) T Townsend	6^{8}	5
10	(China) H Guo (France) K Mladenovic	7^{10}	7

==== Section 2 ====
First round
3	(Kazakhstan) A Danilina (Serbia) A Krunić	6	1	6
(Canada) L Fernandez (Kazakhstan) Y Putintseva	2	6	3
Alt	(Brazil) L Pigossi (Switzerland) S Waltert	6	1	1
(Ukraine) A Kalinina (Ukraine) D Yastremska	4	6	6
PR	(Estonia) I Neel (Mexico) G Olmos	6	6
(Japan) E Hozumi (Chinese Taipei) F-h Wu	3	2
PR	(Croatia) D Jurak Schreiber (Croatia) A Ružić	0	3
15	(Norway) U Eikeri (United States) Q Gleason	6	6
11	(Ukraine) L Kichenok (United States) D Krawczyk	6	6
(Ukraine) O Oliynykova (Mexico) R Zarazúa	1	0
(China) X Jiang (China) Y Xu	2	6	7^{10}
(Switzerland) V Golubic (Czech Republic) T Valentová	6	4	6^{7}
Alt	(Hong Kong) E Chong; A Tikhonova	6	7^{7}
(Italy) E Cocciaretto (United States) A Li	3	6^{3}
WC	(United Kingdom) M Brooks (United Kingdom) A Rajecki	4	2
7	(Germany) L Siegemund; V Zvonareva	6	6

Second round
3	(Kazakhstan) A Danilina (Serbia) A Krunić	2	6	6
(Ukraine) A Kalinina (Ukraine) D Yastremska	6	4	0
PR	(Estonia) I Neel (Mexico) G Olmos	3	7	6
15	(Norway) U Eikeri (United States) Q Gleason	6	5	4
11	(Ukraine) L Kichenok (United States) D Krawczyk	4	5
(China) X Jiang (China) Y Xu	6	7
Alt	(Hong Kong) E Chong; A Tikhonova	2	2
7	(Germany) L Siegemund; V Zvonareva	6	6

Third round
3	(Kazakhstan) A Danilina (Serbia) A Krunić	7	4	4
PR	(Estonia) I Neel (Mexico) G Olmos	5	6	6
(China) X Jiang (China) Y Xu	4	6	6
7	(Germany) L Siegemund; V Zvonareva	6	2	4

Quarterfinals
PR	(Estonia) I Neel (Mexico) G Olmos	1	6	4
(China) X Jiang (China) Y Xu	6	2	6

=== Bottom half ===
==== Section 3 ====
First round
5	(United States) N Melichar-Martinez (New Zealand) E Routliffe	3	4
(Ukraine) M Kostyuk (Romania) E-G Ruse	6	6
WC	(United Kingdom) H Dart (United Kingdom) M Lumsden	3	4
(Indonesia) A Sutjiadi (Indonesia) J Tjen	6	6
(Colombia) C Osorio (Argentina) S Sierra	6	6
Alt/PR	(United Kingdom) S Murray Sharan (Thailand) L Tararudee	3	4
(Japan) M Kato (Uzbekistan) K Rakhimova	5	5
9	(Australia) E Perez (Netherlands) D Schuurs	7	7
13	(Japan) S Aoyama (Chinese Taipei) E-s Liang	5	6	6
(Spain) J Bouzas Maneiro (Turkey) Z Sönmez	7	2	2
WC	(United Kingdom) F Christie (United Kingdom) E Silva	6^{2}	3
(Australia) K Birrell (Australia) T Gibson	7^{7}	6
WC	(United Kingdom) A Dudeney (United Kingdom) M Xu	3	4
(Chinese Taipei) S-w Hsieh (China) Xin Wang	6	6
PR	(Romania) I-C Begu (Romania) J Cristian	1	1
4	(Belgium) E Mertens (China) S Zhang	6	6

Second round
(Ukraine) M Kostyuk (Romania) E-G Ruse	6	7^{10}
(Indonesia) A Sutjiadi (Indonesia) J Tjen	4	6^{8}
(Colombia) C Osorio (Argentina) S Sierra	3	1
9	(Australia) E Perez (Netherlands) D Schuurs	6	6
13	(Japan) S Aoyama (Chinese Taipei) E-s Liang	5	6	6
(Australia) K Birrell (Australia) T Gibson	7	0	3
(Chinese Taipei) S-w Hsieh (China) Xin Wang	6	4	6
4	(Belgium) E Mertens (China) S Zhang	3	6	1

Third round
(Ukraine) M Kostyuk (Romania) E-G Ruse
9	(Australia) E Perez (Netherlands) D Schuurs	w/o
13	(Japan) S Aoyama (Chinese Taipei) E-s Liang	6	4	6
(Chinese Taipei) S-w Hsieh (China) Xin Wang	3	6	2

Quarterfinals
9	(Australia) E Perez (Netherlands) D Schuurs	4	4
13	(Japan) S Aoyama (Chinese Taipei) E-s Liang	6	6

==== Section 4 ====
First round
Alt	(Argentina) N Fossa Huergo (Germany) T Korpatsch	6	4	6
M Kozyreva; I Shymanovich	3	6	3
(France) E Jacquemot (France) D Parry	3	5
(Czech Republic) L Nosková (Slovakia) R Šramková	6	7
(Poland) K Piter (Czech Republic) A Sisková	6	6^{10}	6
WC	(United Kingdom) K Boulter (United Kingdom) H Watson	4	7^{12}	3
(Czech Republic) J Malečková (Czech Republic) M Škoch	6	7^{7}
12	(Slovakia) T Mihalíková (United Kingdom) O Nicholls	2	6^{2}
14	(Australia) S Hunter (United States) C McNally	6^{8}	6	6
(Hungary) A Bondár (Poland) M Fręch	7^{10}	3	3
(Belgium) M Kempen; A Panova	6^{0}	6	7
(United States) I Jovic (Poland) M Linette	7^{7}	1	5
(United States) C Dolehide (United States) A Parks	5	6	6
E Pridankina (China) Q Tang	7	2	2
PR	(Chile) A Guarachi (Poland) A Rosolska	2	2
2	(Canada) G Dabrowski (Brazil) L Stefani	6	6

Second round
Alt	(Argentina) N Fossa Huergo (Germany) T Korpatsch	5	5
(Czech Republic) L Nosková (Slovakia) R Šramková	7	7
(Poland) K Piter (Czech Republic) A Sisková	6	3	7^{10}
(Czech Republic) J Malečková (Czech Republic) M Škoch	4	6	6^{7}
14	(Australia) S Hunter (United States) C McNally	6	5	6
(Belgium) M Kempen; A Panova	3	7	2
(United States) C Dolehide (United States) A Parks	4	2
2	(Canada) G Dabrowski (Brazil) L Stefani	6	6

Third round
(Czech Republic) L Nosková (Slovakia) R Šramková	5	4
(Poland) K Piter (Czech Republic) A Sisková	7	6
14	(Australia) S Hunter (United States) C McNally	1	4
2	(Canada) G Dabrowski (Brazil) L Stefani	6	6

Quarterfinals
(Poland) K Piter (Czech Republic) A Sisková	1	2
2	(Canada) G Dabrowski (Brazil) L Stefani	6	6

== Seeded teams ==
The following are the seeded teams. Seedings are based on WTA rankings as of 22 June 2026.

Country	Player	Country	Player	Rank	Seed
CZE	Kateřina Siniaková	USA	Taylor Townsend	3	1
CAN	Gabriela Dabrowski	BRA	Luisa Stefani	10	2
KAZ	Anna Danilina	SRB	Aleksandra Krunić	11	3
BEL	Elise Mertens	CHN	Zhang Shuai	12	4
USA	Nicole Melichar-Martinez	NZL	Erin Routliffe	24	5
ITA	Sara Errani	ITA	Jasmine Paolini	27	6
GER	Laura Siegemund		Vera Zvonareva	41	7
USA	Sofia Kenin	LAT	Jeļena Ostapenko	47	8
AUS	Ellen Perez	NED	Demi Schuurs	47	9
CHN	Guo Hanyu	FRA	Kristina Mladenovic	51	10
UKR	Lyudmyla Kichenok	USA	Desirae Krawczyk	56	11
SVK	Tereza Mihalíková	GBR	Olivia Nicholls	58	12
JPN	Shuko Aoyama	TPE	Liang En-shuo	59	13
AUS	Storm Hunter	USA	Caty McNally	65	14
NOR	Ulrikke Eikeri	USA	Quinn Gleason	75	15
USA	Asia Muhammad	HUN	Fanny Stollár	75	16

== Other entry information ==
=== Wildcards ===
- (United Kingdom) Katie Boulter / (United Kingdom) Heather Watson
- (United Kingdom) Madeleine Brooks / (United Kingdom) Amelia Rajecki
- (United Kingdom) Jodie Burrage / (United Kingdom) Mika Stojsavljevic
- (United Kingdom) Freya Christie / (United Kingdom) Eden Silva
- (United Kingdom) Harriet Dart / (United Kingdom) Maia Lumsden
- (United Kingdom) Alicia Dudeney / (United Kingdom) Mimi Xu
- ~~(United States) Serena Williams / (United States) Venus Williams~~

=== Protected ranking ===
- (Romania) Irina-Camelia Begu / (Romania) Jaqueline Cristian
- (Czech Republic) Marie Bouzková / (Spain) Sara Sorribes Tormo
- (Chile) Alexa Guarachi / (Poland) Alicja Rosolska
- (Croatia) Darija Jurak Schreiber / (Croatia) Antonia Ružić
- (United Kingdom) Samantha Murray Sharan / (Thailand) Lanlana Tararudee
- (Estonia) Ingrid Neel / (Mexico) Giuliana Olmos

=== Alternates ===
- (Hong Kong) Eudice Chong / Anastasia Tikhonova
- (Argentina) Nicole Fossa Huergo / (Germany) Tamara Korpatsch
- (United Kingdom) Samantha Murray Sharan / (Thailand) Lanlana Tararudee
- (Brazil) Laura Pigossi / (Switzerland) Simona Waltert

=== Withdrawals ===
- (Poland) Maja Chwalińska / (Austria) Sinja Kraus → replaced by (Hong Kong) Eudice Chong / Anastasia Tikhonova
- (Romania) Sorana Cîrstea / Anna Kalinskaya → replaced by (Brazil) Laura Pigossi / (Switzerland) Simona Waltert
- (Italy) Sara Errani / (Italy) Jasmine Paolini → replaced by (Argentina) Nicole Fossa Huergo / (Germany) Tamara Korpatsch
- (United States) Serena Williams / (United States) Venus Williams → replaced by (United Kingdom) Samantha Murray Sharan / (Thailand) Lanlana Tararudee
