= 2026 Nottingham Open – Men's singles =

Men's singles
- 2026 Nottingham Open

Final
- Champion: (Australia) Christopher O'Connell
- Runner-up: (Finland) Otto Virtanen
- Score: 7–6^{(7–3)}, 7–6^{(8–6)}

Events
| Singles | men | women |
| Doubles | men | women |
- Nottingham Open

Marin Čilić was the reigning champion but chose to compete at Queen's instead.

Christopher O'Connell won the title after defeating Otto Virtanen 7–6^{(7–3)}, 7–6^{(8–6)} in the final.

== Seeds ==
1. (Portugal) Jaime Faria (second round)
2. (France) Benjamin Bonzi (quarterfinals)
3. (China) Wu Yibing (second round)
4. (Hong Kong) Coleman Wong (first round)
5. (France) Hugo Gaston (first round)
6. (Portugal) Henrique Rocha (first round)
7. (Norway) Nicolai Budkov Kjær (first round)
8. (Australia) Tristan Schoolkate (withdrew)

== Draw ==
Key

- Q = Qualifier
- WC = Wild card
- LL = Lucky loser
- Alt = Alternate
- ITF = ITF entry
- PR = Protected ranking
- SR = Special ranking
- SE = Special exempt
- JE = Junior exempt
- JR = Junior Accelerator Programme entrant
- CO = College Accelerator Programme entrant
- NG = Next Gen Accelerator Program entrant
- w/o = Walkover
- r = Retired
- d = Defaulted

=== Finals ===
Semifinals
Q | (China) Zhang Zhizhen | 4 | 7^{7} | 5
(Finland) Otto Virtanen | 6 | 6^{5} | 7
Q | (Switzerland) Rémy Bertola | 4 | 5
(Australia) Christopher O'Connell | 6 | 7

Final
(Finland) Otto Virtanen | 6^{3} | 6^{6}
(Australia) Christopher O'Connell | 7^{7} | 7^{8}

=== Top half ===
First round
1 | (Portugal) J Faria | 6 | 6
(Tunisia) M Echargui | 3 | 4
NG | (United States) Dar Blanch | 4 | 7^{10} | 4
Q | (China) Z Zhang | 6 | 6^{8} | 6
WC | (United Kingdom) O Tarvet | 6 | 3 | 2
R Safiullin | 4 | 6 | 6
Q | (United Kingdom) A Gray | 4 | 5
LL | (Denmark) A Holmgren | 6 | 7
4 | (Hong Kong) C Wong | 5 | 6 | 1
WC | (United Kingdom) B Harris | 7 | 3 | 6
Q | (United Kingdom) A Matusevich | 3 | 3
(France) A Géa | 6 | 6
LL | (South Korea) S-w Kwon | 2 | 5
(Finland) O Virtanen | 6 | 7
WC | (United Kingdom) F Gill | 7^{7} | 6^{2} | 6
5 | (France) H Gaston | 6^{4} | 7^{7} | 2

Second round
1 | (Portugal) J Faria | 4 | 5
Q | (China) Z Zhang | 6 | 7
R Safiullin | 6 | 6
LL | (Denmark) A Holmgren | 3 | 2
WC | (United Kingdom) B Harris | 7^{7} | 6^{3} | 6
(France) A Géa | 6^{3} | 7^{7} | 4
(Finland) O Virtanen | 6 | 6
WC | (United Kingdom) F Gill | 2 | 3

Quarterfinals
Q | (China) Z Zhang | 6^{4} | 7^{13} | 6
R Safiullin | 7^{7} | 6^{11} | 1
WC | (United Kingdom) B Harris | 6^{3} | 6^{3}
(Finland) O Virtanen | 7^{7} | 7^{7}

Semifinals
Q | (China) Z Zhang | 4 | 7^{7} | 5
(Finland) O Virtanen | 6 | 6^{5} | 7

=== Bottom half ===
First round
7 | (Norway) N Budkov Kjær | 6 | 3 | 2
(United States) M McDonald | 3 | 6 | 6
(Japan) S Mochizuki | 7^{7} | 3 | 7^{7}
(United States) M Zheng | 6^{2} | 6 | 6^{5}
Q | (Italy) L Nardi | 6 | 6^{4} | 6^{2}
Q | (Switzerland) R Bertola | 3 | 7^{7} | 7^{7}
(Japan) R Sakamoto | 5 | 1
3 | (China) Y Wu | 7 | 6
6 | (Portugal) H Rocha | 6^{2} | 1
(Australia) C O'Connell | 7^{7} | 6
SE | (United States) T Boyer | 6^{3} | 3
Q | (United Kingdom) J Clarke | 7^{7} | 6
(Australia) D Sweeny | 7^{18} | 1 | 2
(United Kingdom) J Fearnley | 6^{16} | 6 | 6
(Chile) T Barrios Vera | 3 | 6 | 3
2 | (France) B Bonzi | 6 | 2 | 6

Second round
(United States) M McDonald | 6^{3} | 5
(Japan) S Mochizuki | 7^{7} | 7
Q | (Switzerland) R Bertola | 6 | 6
3 | (China) Y Wu | 3 | 3
(Australia) C O'Connell | 4 | 6 | 7^{7}
Q | (United Kingdom) J Clarke | 6 | 4 | 6^{5}
(United Kingdom) J Fearnley | 1 | 6^{5}
2 | (France) B Bonzi | 6 | 7^{7}

Quarterfinals
(Japan) S Mochizuki | 3 | 4
Q | (Switzerland) R Bertola | 6 | 6
(Australia) C O'Connell | 6 | 6
2 | (France) B Bonzi | 4 | 4

Semifinals
Q | (Switzerland) R Bertola | 4 | 5
(Australia) C O'Connell | 6 | 7
