= 2026 Wimbledon Championships – Women's singles =

Tennis championship

Ladies' singles
- 2026 Wimbledon Championships

Final
- Champion: (Czech Republic) Linda Nosková
- Runner-up: (Czech Republic) Karolína Muchová
- Score: 6–2, 5–7, 6–3
- Date: 11 July 2026

Details
- Draw: 128 (16Q / 8WC)
- Seeds: 32

Events
Singles	men	women		boys	girls
Doubles	men	women	mixed	boys	girls
WC Singles	men	women	quad
WC Doubles	men	women	quad
14&U Singles	boys	girls
Legends	men	women	mixed

Qualification
Singles	men	women
- Wimbledon Championships

Linda Nosková defeated Karolína Muchová in the final, 6–2, 5–7, 6–3 to win the ladies' singles tennis title at the 2026 Wimbledon Championships. She saved a match point (in the third round against Sorana Cîrstea) en route to her first major title and third career WTA Tour title overall. Aged 21 years and 236 days old, Nosková was the youngest Wimbledon champion since Petra Kvitová in 2011. The Czech Republic became the sixth country in the Open Era to have two countrywomen contest a major singles final.

Iga Świątek was the defending champion, but lost in the third round to Alexandra Eala. Eala became the first Filipina player in the Open Era to reach the third and fourth rounds of a major. The defeat of Barbora Krejčíková in the fourth round guaranteed a first-time Wimbledon champion for the ninth consecutive edition.

Aryna Sabalenka retained the world No. 1 singles ranking after Elena Rybakina lost in the third round. Sabalenka's fourth-round defeat to Naomi Osaka marked the first time she failed to reach the quarterfinals of a major since the 2022 French Open, and her first straight-sets defeat at a major since the 2020 US Open.

This tournament marked the singles return of former world No. 1 and 23-time major champion Serena Williams, who last played at the 2022 US Open. She lost in the first round to Maya Joint. Maja Chwalińska was the third player in the Open Era to be seeded at a major while also being entered as a wildcard, following Martina Hingis at the 2002 US Open and Patty Schnyder at the 2004 Wimbledon Championships. Lina Gjorcheska became the first player from North Macedonia to compete in a major main draw.

== Seeds ==
1. Aryna Sabalenka (fourth round)
2. (Kazakhstan) Elena Rybakina (third round)
3. (Poland) Iga Świątek (third round)
4. (United States) Jessica Pegula (quarterfinals)
5. Mirra Andreeva (second round)
6. (United States) Amanda Anisimova (third round)
7. (United States) Coco Gauff (semifinals)
8. (Ukraine) Elina Svitolina (first round)
9. (Czech Republic) Linda Nosková (champion)
10. (Czech Republic) Karolína Muchová (final)
11. (Switzerland) Belinda Bencic (fourth round)
12. (Ukraine) Marta Kostyuk (semifinals)
13. (Italy) Jasmine Paolini (quarterfinals)
14. (Japan) Naomi Osaka (quarterfinals)
15. Diana Shnaider (second round)
16. (United States) Iva Jovic (fourth round)
17. (Romania) Sorana Cîrstea (third round)
18. Ekaterina Alexandrova (third round)
19. Anna Kalinskaya (third round)
20. (Poland) Maja Chwalińska (first round)
21. (Czech Republic) Marie Bouzková (fourth round)
22. (Canada) Leylah Fernandez (first round)
23. (United States) Emma Navarro (third round)
24. (Denmark) Clara Tauson (first round)
25. (Belgium) Elise Mertens (quarterfinals)
26. (United States) Madison Keys (fourth round)
27. (Austria) Anastasia Potapova (first round)
28. (United States) Ann Li (first round)
29. (Philippines) Alexandra Eala (fourth round)
30. (United Kingdom) Emma Raducanu (withdrew)
31. (Croatia) Donna Vekić (first round)
32. (Czech Republic) Kateřina Siniaková (second round)

== Draw ==
Key

- Q = Qualifier
- WC = Wild card
- LL = Lucky loser
- Alt = Alternate
- ITF = ITF entry
- PR = Protected ranking
- SR = Special ranking
- SE = Special exempt
- JE = Junior exempt
- JR = Junior Accelerator Programme entrant
- CO = College Accelerator Programme entrant
- NG = Next Gen Accelerator Program entrant
- w/o = Walkover
- r = Retired
- d = Defaulted

=== Finals ===
Quarterfinals
14	(Japan) Naomi Osaka	6^{4}	4
10	(Czech Republic) Karolína Muchová	7^{7}	6
4	(United States) Jessica Pegula	6	3	3
7	(United States) Coco Gauff	4	6	6
12	(Ukraine) Marta Kostyuk	6	6
13	(Italy) Jasmine Paolini	3	2
9	(Czech Republic) Linda Nosková	6	7
25	(Belgium) Elise Mertens	3	5

Semifinals
10	(Czech Republic) Karolína Muchová	6	1	7^{12}
7	(United States) Coco Gauff	2	6	6^{10}
12	(Ukraine) Marta Kostyuk	4	4
9	(Czech Republic) Linda Nosková	6	6

Final
10	(Czech Republic) Karolína Muchová	2	7	3
9	(Czech Republic) Linda Nosková	6	5	6

=== Top half ===
==== Section 1 ====
First round
1	A Sabalenka	6	6
Q	(Serbia) T Kostović	2	3
(Ukraine) O Oliynykova	0	0
(United States) M Kessler	6	6
(Latvia) J Ostapenko	6	3	6
WC	(United Kingdom) H Dart	3	6	4
(Croatia) A Ružić	6	3	6
LL	(Latvia) D Semeņistaja	3	6	3
22	(Canada) L Fernandez	1	6^{3}
(Indonesia) J Tjen	6	7^{7}
WC	(United Kingdom) M Xu	2	6	2
(Australia) D Kasatkina	6	3	6
Q	A Gasanova	6	6
(Colombia) E Arango	3	1
(France) E Jacquemot	1	5
14	(Japan) N Osaka	6	7

Second round
1	A Sabalenka	6	7^{11}
(United States) M Kessler	1	6^{9}
(Latvia) J Ostapenko	6	6
(Croatia) A Ružić	2	0
(Indonesia) J Tjen	7^{7}	1	4
(Australia) D Kasatkina	6^{5}	6	6
Q	A Gasanova	3	2
14	(Japan) N Osaka	6	6

Third round
1	A Sabalenka	6	6
(Latvia) J Ostapenko	4	4
(Australia) D Kasatkina	1	3
14	(Japan) N Osaka	6	6

Fourth round
1	A Sabalenka	2	6^{2}
14	(Japan) N Osaka	6	7^{7}

==== Section 2 ====
First round
10	(Czech Republic) K Muchová	6	6
A Zakharova	3	2
Q	(Canada) B Andreescu	6^{3}	6^{6}
(China) S Zhang	7^{7}	7^{8}
(United States) A Parks	6	6
WC	(United Kingdom) A Dudeney	3	3
Q	(Thailand) M Sawangkaew	2	7	6
20/WC	(Poland) M Chwalińska	6	5	2
32	(Czech Republic) K Siniaková	6	6
(China) Q Zheng	4	4
(United States) P Stearns	4	6	5
(Czech Republic) N Bartůňková	6	3	7
(Czech Republic) B Krejčíková	6	6
WC	(United Kingdom) H Klugman	1	4
(Poland) M Linette	5	4
5	M Andreeva	7	6

Second round
10	(Czech Republic) K Muchová	6	6
(China) S Zhang	3	2
(United States) A Parks	5	0
Q	(Thailand) M Sawangkaew	7	6
32	(Czech Republic) K Siniaková	2	4
(Czech Republic) N Bartůňková	6	6
(Czech Republic) B Krejčíková	4	7	6
5	M Andreeva	6	5	4

Third round
10	(Czech Republic) K Muchová	6	7^{7}
Q	(Thailand) M Sawangkaew	2	6^{1}
(Czech Republic) N Bartůňková	3	5
(Czech Republic) B Krejčíková	6	7

Fourth round
10	(Czech Republic) K Muchová	7	5	6
(Czech Republic) B Krejčíková	5	7	3

==== Section 3 ====
First round
4	(United States) J Pegula	7	6
(Czech Republic) D Vidmanova	5	3
PR	(Spain) S Sorribes Tormo	6	6
(Andorra) V Jiménez Kasintseva	2	3
(Ukraine) D Yastremska	7^{7}	4	7
PR	(Japan) A Ito	6^{1}	6	5
(Spain) J Bouzas Maneiro	6	6
27	(Austria) A Potapova	2	3
18	E Alexandrova	6	6
(Hungary) P Udvardy	4	2
(Thailand) L Tararudee	7^{7}	5	6
(Austria) L Tagger	6^{3}	7	4
(Kazakhstan) Y Putintseva	4	4
(Germany) T Maria	6	6
(Romania) J Cristian	6^{1}	0
16	(United States) I Jovic	7^{7}	6

Second round
4	(United States) J Pegula	7^{8}	6
PR	(Spain) S Sorribes Tormo	6^{6}	1
(Ukraine) D Yastremska	3	7^{7}	2
(Spain) J Bouzas Maneiro	6	6^{1}	6
18	E Alexandrova	7	7
(Thailand) L Tararudee	5	5
(Germany) T Maria	1	2
16	(United States) I Jovic	6	6

Third round
4	(United States) J Pegula	6	6
(Spain) J Bouzas Maneiro	1	3
18	E Alexandrova	3	6	4
16	(United States) I Jovic	6	3	6

Fourth round
4	(United States) J Pegula	4	6	6
16	(United States) I Jovic	6	3	1

==== Section 4 ====
First round
11	(Switzerland) B Bencic	6	6
WC	(United Kingdom) M Stojsavljevic	2	1
(China) Xin Wang	6	2	6
(Italy) E Cocciaretto	3	6	2
(United Kingdom) F Jones	4	4
(France) D Parry	6	6
(Poland) M Fręch	6^{5}	4
19	A Kalinskaya	7^{7}	6
28	(United States) A Li	5	6	4
(Turkey) Z Sönmez	7	1	6
Q	(United States) C Liu	4	6	6
(Belgium) H Vandewinkel	6	3	4
(Argentina) S Sierra	6	5	7
(Hungary) A Bondár	3	7	5
(Germany) T Korpatsch	2	1
7	(United States) C Gauff	6	6

Second round
11	(Switzerland) B Bencic	7	6
(China) Xin Wang	5	0
(France) D Parry	4	6	6^{8}
19	A Kalinskaya	6	3	7^{10}
(Turkey) Z Sönmez	5	3
Q	(United States) C Liu	7	6
(Argentina) S Sierra	3	6	6^{7}
7	(United States) C Gauff	6	3	7^{10}

Third round
11	(Switzerland) B Bencic	6	4	7^{10}
19	A Kalinskaya	4	6	6^{6}
Q	(United States) C Liu	3	7^{7}	2
7	(United States) C Gauff	6	6^{5}	6

Fourth round
11	(Switzerland) B Bencic	6	3	4
7	(United States) C Gauff	4	6	6

=== Bottom half ===
==== Section 5 ====
First round
8	(Ukraine) E Svitolina	5	2
(Ukraine) D Snigur	7	6
(Slovenia) V Erjavec	4	6	6^{6}
Q	(France) L Jeanjean	6	4	7^{10}
(Australia) A Tomljanović	2	6	4
Q	(Georgia (country)) M Bolkvadze	6	2	6
Q	(United States) A Krueger	3	7^{7}	6
31	(Croatia) D Vekić	6	6^{3}	4
23	(United States) E Navarro	4	6	7
(Spain) P Badosa	6	3	5
(Spain) O Selekhmeteva	6	7
(Austria) S Kraus	1	5
(Ukraine) Y Starodubtseva	7^{7}	4	1
A Blinkova	6^{3}	6	6
PR	(Argentina) N Podoroska	1	2
12	(Ukraine) M Kostyuk	6	6

Second round
(Ukraine) D Snigur	6	6
Q	(France) L Jeanjean	4	3
Q	(Georgia (country)) M Bolkvadze	1	0
Q	(United States) A Krueger	6	6
23	(United States) E Navarro	3	6	6
(Spain) O Selekhmeteva	6	4	1
A Blinkova	7^{7}	3	3
12	(Ukraine) M Kostyuk	6^{5}	6	6

Third round
(Ukraine) D Snigur	3	2
Q	(United States) A Krueger	6	6
23	(United States) E Navarro	2	6	1
12	(Ukraine) M Kostyuk	6	4	6

Fourth round
Q	(United States) A Krueger	4	4
12	(Ukraine) M Kostyuk	6	6

==== Section 6 ====
First round
13	(Italy) J Paolini	0	6	7
Q	(United States) R Montgomery	6	4	5
Q	I Shymanovich	2	6	1
(Switzerland) V Golubic	6	2	6
(Ukraine) A Kalinina	6	4	5
(Uzbekistan) K Rakhimova	4	6	7
(Greece) M Sakkari	6	6
24	(Denmark) C Tauson	3	3
29	(Philippines) A Eala	6	6
(Mexico) R Zarazúa	1	2
WC	(United States) S Williams	3	7^{8}	3
(Australia) M Joint	6	6^{6}	6
(Czech Republic) T Valentová	3	4
PR	(Czech Republic) Ka Plíšková	6	6
(United States) T Townsend	1	6	3
3	(Poland) I Świątek	6	2	6

Second round
13	(Italy) J Paolini	7^{7}	6
(Switzerland) V Golubic	6^{0}	4
(Uzbekistan) K Rakhimova	3	6	6^{7}
(Greece) M Sakkari	6	0	7^{10}
29	(Philippines) A Eala	3	6	6
(Australia) M Joint	6	2	0
PR	(Czech Republic) Ka Plíšková	1	3
3	(Poland) I Świątek	6	6

Third round
13	(Italy) J Paolini	6	6
(Greece) M Sakkari	1	2
29	(Philippines) A Eala	7^{11}	6
3	(Poland) I Świątek	6^{9}	2

Fourth round
13	(Italy) J Paolini	6	4	6
29	(Philippines) A Eala	4	6	3

==== Section 7 ====
First round
6	(United States) A Anisimova	6	6
Q	(North Macedonia) L Gjorcheska	3	2
(Croatia) P Marčinko	6^{4}	4
(United States) S Kenin	7^{7}	6
PR	(Romania) I-C Begu	4	4
WC	(United Kingdom) K Swan	6	6
Q	(United States) K Day	7^{7}	4	3
26	(United States) M Keys	6^{5}	6	6
17	(Romania) S Cîrstea	6	7^{8}
(Czech Republic) S Bejlek	1	6^{6}
(Australia) K Birrell	6	0	6
Q	A Korneeva	3	6	2
(Colombia) C Osorio	6	6
(Switzerland) S Waltert	2	1
(Germany) E Seidel	4	3
9	(Czech Republic) L Nosková	6	6

Second round
6	(United States) A Anisimova	6	4	7^{10}
(United States) S Kenin	2	6	6^{3}
WC	(United Kingdom) K Swan	1	4
26	(United States) M Keys	6	6
17	(Romania) S Cîrstea	6	6
(Australia) K Birrell	3	4
(Colombia) C Osorio	3	6	2
9	(Czech Republic) L Nosková	6	4	6

Third round
6	(United States) A Anisimova	6	2	3
26	(United States) M Keys	3	6	6
17	(Romania) S Cîrstea	6	3	6^{9}
9	(Czech Republic) L Nosková	2	6	7^{11}

Fourth round
26	(United States) M Keys	4	6^{2}
9	(Czech Republic) L Nosková	6	7^{7}

==== Section 8 ====
First round
15	D Shnaider	7	6
(Germany) E Lys	5	1
Q	(Uzbekistan) P Kudermetova	3	3
L Samsonova	6	6
(United Kingdom) K Boulter	4	2
Q	(Italy) TC Grant	6	6
(Australia) T Gibson	1	6	2
21	(Czech Republic) M Bouzková	6	3	6
25	(Belgium) E Mertens	6	6
(Germany) L Siegemund	2	4
(Brazil) B Haddad Maia	3	2
Q	(Uzbekistan) M Timofeeva	6	6
(Romania) E-G Ruse	5	3
(United States) C McNally	7	6
(France) L Boisson	4	6	3
2	(Kazakhstan) E Rybakina	6	1	6

Second round
15	D Shnaider	4	6	2
L Samsonova	6	4	6
Q	(Italy) TC Grant	5	3
21	(Czech Republic) M Bouzková	7	6
25	(Belgium) E Mertens	2	6	6
Q	(Uzbekistan) M Timofeeva	6	3	0
(United States) C McNally	1	2
2	(Kazakhstan) E Rybakina	6	6

Third round
L Samsonova	6	6^{3}	4
21	(Czech Republic) M Bouzková	4	7^{7}	6
25	(Belgium) E Mertens	7^{7}	6
2	(Kazakhstan) E Rybakina	6^{4}	1

Fourth round
21	(Czech Republic) M Bouzková	4	4
25	(Belgium) E Mertens	6	6

== Championship match statistics ==
Category	(Czech Republic) Nosková	(Czech Republic) Muchová
1st serve %	68/107 (64%)	58/94 (62%)
1st serve points won	50 of 68 = 74%	37 of 58 = 64%
2nd serve points won	21 of 39 = 54%	19 of 36 = 53%
Total service points won	71 of 107 = 66.36%	56 of 94 = 59.57%
Aces	10	6
Double faults	4	1
Winners	44	35
Unforced errors	36	27
Net points won	16 of 24 = 67%	12 of 19 = 63%
Break points converted	4 of 13 = 31%	2 of 15 = 13%
Return points won	38 of 94 = 40%	36 of 107 = 34%
Total points won	109	92

== Seeded players ==
The following are the seeded players. Seedings are based on WTA rankings as of 22 June 2026. Rankings and points before are as of 29 June 2026.

^{‡}	Champion
^{†}	Runner-up

Seed	Rank	Player	Points before	Points defending	Points earned	Points after	Status
1	1	Aryna Sabalenka	9,090	780	240	8,550	Fourth round lost to (Japan) Naomi Osaka [14]
2	2	(Kazakhstan) Elena Rybakina	8,143	130	130	8,143	Third round lost to (Belgium) Elise Mertens [25]
3	3	(Poland) Iga Świątek	6,409	2,000	130	4,539	Third round lost to (Philippines) Alexandra Eala [29]
4	4	(United States) Jessica Pegula	5,881	10	430	6,301	Quarterfinals lost to (United States) Coco Gauff [7]
5	5	Mirra Andreeva	5,653	430	70	5,293	Second round lost to (Czech Republic) Barbora Krejčíková
6	6	(United States) Amanda Anisimova	5,523	1,300	130	4,353	Third round lost to (United States) Madison Keys [26]
7	7	(United States) Coco Gauff	4,879	10	780	5,649	Semifinals lost to (Czech Republic) Karolína Muchová [10]
8	8	(Ukraine) Elina Svitolina	4,471	130	10	4,351	First round lost to (Ukraine) Daria Snigur
9	12	(Czech Republic) Linda Nosková^{‡}	3,359	240	2,000	5,119	Champion, defeated (Czech Republic) Karolína Muchová [10]
10	9	(Czech Republic) Karolína Muchová^{†}	3,878	10	1,300	5,168	Runner-up, lost to (Czech Republic) Linda Nosková [9]
11	11	(Switzerland) Belinda Bencic	3,385	780	240	2,845	Fourth round lost to (United States) Coco Gauff [7]
12	13	(Ukraine) Marta Kostyuk	3,156	10	780	3,916	Semifinals lost to (Czech Republic) Linda Nosková [9]
13	17	(Italy) Jasmine Paolini	2,423	70	430	2,783	Quarterfinals lost to (Ukraine) Marta Kostyuk [12]
14	14	(Japan) Naomi Osaka	2,846	130	430	3,146	Quarterfinals lost to (Czech Republic) Karolína Muchová [10]
15	15	Diana Shnaider	2,458	70	70	2,458	Second round lost to Liudmila Samsonova
16	16	(United States) Iva Jovic	2,436	40	240	2,636	Fourth round lost to (United States) Jessica Pegula [4]
17	18	(Romania) Sorana Cîrstea	2,415	10	130	2,535	Third round lost to (Czech Republic) Linda Nosková [9]
18	19	Ekaterina Alexandrova	2,411	240	130	2,301	Third round lost to (United States) Iva Jovic [16]
19	20	Anna Kalinskaya	2,240	70	130	2,300	Third round lost to (Switzerland) Belinda Bencic [11]
20	21	(Poland) Maja Chwalińska	1,996	2	10	2,004	First round lost to (Thailand) Mananchaya Sawangkaew [Q]
21	23	(Czech Republic) Marie Bouzková	1,849	70	240	2,019	Fourth round lost to (Belgium) Elise Mertens [25]
22	24	(Canada) Leylah Fernandez	1,844	70	10	1,784	First round lost to (Indonesia) Janice Tjen
23	26	(United States) Emma Navarro	1,784	240	130	1,674	Third round lost to (Ukraine) Marta Kostyuk [12]
24	25	(Denmark) Clara Tauson	1,804	240	10	1,574	First round lost to (Greece) Maria Sakkari
25	27	(Belgium) Elise Mertens	1,758	240	430	1,948	Quarterfinals lost to (Czech Republic) Linda Nosková [9]
26	22	(United States) Madison Keys	1,854	130	240	1,964	Fourth round lost to (Czech Republic) Linda Nosková [9]
27	28	(Austria) Anastasia Potapova	1,657	0	10	1,667	First round lost to (Spain) Jéssica Bouzas Maneiro
28	29	(United States) Ann Li	1,625	70	10	1,565	First round lost to (Turkey) Zeynep Sönmez
29	32	(Philippines) Alexandra Eala	1,436	10	240	1,666	Fourth round lost to (Italy) Jasmine Paolini [13]
30	33	(United Kingdom) Emma Raducanu	1,429	130	0	1,299	Withdrew due to leg injury
31	34	(Croatia) Donna Vekić	1,386	70	10	1,326	First round lost to (United States) Ashlyn Krueger [Q]
32	36	(Czech Republic) Kateřina Siniaková	1,338	70	70	1,338	Second round lost to (Czech Republic) Nikola Bartůňková

=== Withdrawn seeded players ===
The following players would have been seeded, but withdrew before the tournament draw was made.

Rank	Player	Points before	Points dropping	Points after	Withdrawal reason
10	(Canada) Victoria Mboko	3,670	100	3,570	Left knee injury
30	(United States) Hailey Baptiste	1,502	130	1,372	Left knee injury

== Other entry information ==
=== Wildcards ===
- (Poland) Maja Chwalińska
- (United Kingdom) Harriet Dart
- (United Kingdom) Alicia Dudeney
- (United Kingdom) Hannah Klugman
- (United Kingdom) Mika Stojsavljevic
- (United Kingdom) Katie Swan
- (United States) Serena Williams
- (United Kingdom) Mimi Xu

=== Protected ranking ===
- (Czech Republic) Karolína Plíšková (40)
- (Romania) Irina-Camelia Begu (82)
- (Spain) Sara Sorribes Tormo (85)
- (Japan) Aoi Ito (87)
- (Argentina) Nadia Podoroska (106)

=== Qualifiers ===
- (Canada) Bianca Andreescu
- (Georgia (country)) Mariam Bolkvadze
- (United States) Kayla Day
- Anastasia Gasanova
- (North Macedonia) Lina Gjorcheska
- (Italy) Tyra Caterina Grant
- (France) Léolia Jeanjean
- Alina Korneeva
- (Serbia) Teodora Kostović
- (United States) Ashlyn Krueger
- (Uzbekistan) Polina Kudermetova
- (United States) Claire Liu
- (United States) Robin Montgomery
- (Thailand) Mananchaya Sawangkaew
- Iryna Shymanovich
- (Uzbekistan) Maria Timofeeva

=== Lucky loser ===
- (Latvia) Darja Semeņistaja

=== Withdrawals ===
- † (France) Varvara Gracheva (67) → replaced by (Austria) Sinja Kraus (101)
- ‡ (United States) Hailey Baptiste (26) → replaced by (Belgium) Hanne Vandewinkel (102)
- ‡ (United Kingdom) Sonay Kartal (60) → replaced by (Spain) Paula Badosa (103)
- ‡ (Canada) Victoria Mboko (9) → replaced by (Czech Republic) Darja Vidmanova (104)
- ‡ Veronika Kudermetova (86) → replaced by (United Kingdom) Francesca Jones (105)
- ‡ (Spain) Cristina Bucșa (31) → replaced by (Andorra) Victoria Jiménez Kasintseva (106)
- ‡ (Czech Republic) Markéta Vondroušová (44) → replaced by (Argentina) Nadia Podoroska (106 PR)
- § (United Kingdom) Emma Raducanu (37) → replaced by (Latvia) Darja Semeņistaja (LL)

† – not on the entry list
‡ – withdrew from entry list
§ – withdrew from main draw

Preceded by 2026 French Open – Women's singles	Grand Slam women's singles	Succeeded by 2026 US Open – Women's singles
