= 2026 Nottingham Open – Men's doubles =

Men's doubles
- 2026 Nottingham Open

Final
- Champions: (Brazil) Fernando Romboli (United States) Theodore Winegar
- Runners-up: (United States) Mac Kiger (United States) Reese Stalder
- Score: 6–3, 6–4

Events
Singles	men	women
Doubles	men	women
- Nottingham Open

Santiago González and Austin Krajicek were the defending champions, but Krajicek chose to compete at Queen's instead. González partnered Mackenzie McDonald but lost in the quarterfinals to Mac Kiger and Reese Stalder.

Fernando Romboli and Theodore Winegar won the title after defeating Kiger and Stalder 6–3, 6–4 in the final.

== Seeds ==
1. (Germany) Hendrik Jebens / (Czech Republic) Matěj Vocel (quarterfinals)
2. (India) Sriram Balaji / (Brazil) Marcelo Demoliner (semifinals)
3. (Belgium) Sander Gillé / (Netherlands) Sem Verbeek (quarterfinals)
4. (Chinese Taipei) Ray Ho / (Mexico) Miguel Ángel Reyes-Varela (first round)

== Draw ==
Key

- Q = Qualifier
- WC = Wild card
- LL = Lucky loser
- Alt = Alternate
- ITF = ITF entry
- PR = Protected ranking
- SR = Special ranking
- SE = Special exempt
- JE = Junior exempt
- JR = Junior Accelerator Programme entrant
- CO = College Accelerator Programme entrant
- NG = Next Gen Accelerator Program entrant
- w/o = Walkover
- r = Retired
- d = Defaulted

First round
1	(Germany) H Jebens (Czech Republic) M Vocel	6	6
Alt	(India) VS Prashanth (India) D Sharan	4	3
(Ecuador) G Escobar (United States) B Kittay	6^{5}	7	[4]
(Brazil) F Romboli (United States) T Winegar	7^{7}	5	[10]
3	(Belgium) S Gillé (Netherlands) S Verbeek	6^{4}	6	[10]
WC	(United Kingdom) F Gill (United Kingdom) B Harris	7^{7}	3	[8]
(New Zealand) F Reynolds (New Zealand) J Watt	7^{9}	7^{9}
(France) A Reymond (France) L Sanchez	6^{7}	6^{7}
(Mexico) S González (United States) M McDonald	5	6	[10]
(Portugal) J Faria (Portugal) H Rocha	7	3	[8]
(United States) M Kiger (United States) R Stalder	6	7
4	(Chinese Taipei) R Ho (Mexico) M Reyes-Varela	3	5
WC	(United Kingdom) F Bass (United Kingdom) S Duncan	6^{4}	6^{4}
(India) A Chandrasekar (Japan) T Yuzuki	7^{7}	7^{7}
(Colombia) N Barrientos (Uruguay) A Behar	4	6	[8]
2	(India) S Balaji (Brazil) M Demoliner	6	3	[10]

Quarterfinals
1	(Germany) H Jebens (Czech Republic) M Vocel	6^{3}	6^{4}
(Brazil) F Romboli (United States) T Winegar	7^{7}	7^{7}
3	(Belgium) S Gillé (Netherlands) S Verbeek	7^{9}	2	[11]
(New Zealand) F Reynolds (New Zealand) J Watt	6^{7}	6	[13]
(Mexico) S González (United States) M McDonald	6	6^{2}	[6]
(United States) M Kiger (United States) R Stalder	2	7^{7}	[10]
(India) A Chandrasekar (Japan) T Yuzuki	6^{4}	6^{7}
2	(India) S Balaji (Brazil) M Demoliner	7^{7}	7^{9}

Semifinals
(Brazil) F Romboli (United States) T Winegar	6^{4}	6	[10]
(New Zealand) F Reynolds (New Zealand) J Watt	7^{7}	4	[5]
(United States) M Kiger (United States) R Stalder	7^{7}	7^{8}
2	(India) S Balaji (Brazil) M Demoliner	6^{4}	6^{6}

Final
(Brazil) F Romboli (United States) T Winegar	6	6
(United States) M Kiger (United States) R Stalder	3	4
