= Alicia Dudeney =

British tennis player (born 2003)

- Country (sports): (United Kingdom) Great Britain
- Born: 28 May 2003 (age 23) Hove, England, UK
- Height: 1.77 m (5 ft 10 in)
- Plays: Right-handed
- Prize money: $217,111

Singles
- Career record: 106–46
- Career titles: 9 ITF
- Highest ranking: No. 209 (26 October 2026)
- Current ranking: No. 209 (26 October 2026)

Grand Slam singles results
- Wimbledon: 1R (2026)

Doubles
- Career record: 62–24
- Career titles: 9 ITF
- Highest ranking: No. 196 (14 September 2026)
- Current ranking: No. 200 (26 October 2026)

Grand Slam doubles results
- Wimbledon: 1R (2026)
- Last updated on: 30 October 2026.

Alicia Dudeney (born 28 May 2003) is a British tennis player. She reached a career-high singles ranking of world No. 209 on 26 October 2026 and has a doubles best by the WTA of 196, achieved on 14 September 2026.

== Career ==
=== 2022: WTA 500 qualifying draw ===
In June, she was granted a wildcard in the qualifying draw of the WTA 500-level Eastbourne International but lost to Croat Donna Vekić in the first round.

=== 2025: First ITF Tour titles ===
Dudeney reached her first ITF Tour final at the W15 Monastir, but lost to Hibah Shaikh. In August, she defeated fellow Briton Hannah Klugman to claim her first title at the W35 Roehampton. She won back-to-back titles at Monastir, defeating Arina Bulatova and Anna Petkovic, respectively, in the finals.

=== 2026: WTA Tour main-draw and major debuts ===
In March, she claimed two more back-to-back titles at Monastir and in May defeated Emily Appleton to achieve her first W35 title at Nottingham. Shortly after, she achieved another W35 title at Estepona, defeating Nahia Berecoechea in three sets.

In June at the Nottingham Open, Dudeney was given a wildcard entry into qualifying and defeated Yulia Putintseva for her first win against a top-100 ranked opponent, only to lose in the second round. However, she was given a lucky loser place due to the withdrawal of Loïs Boisson and went on to make her WTA Tour main-draw debut in a straight sets first round defeat to Dayana Yastremska. At the same tournament, Dudeney partnered with fellow Briton Mimi Xu in the doubles as a wildcard pairing.

Dudeney received a wildcard for the singles and doubles main draws at Wimbledon. She lost in the singles first round to Alycia Parks. Dudeney partnered with Mimi Xu in the doubles, losing to Hsieh Su-wei and Wang Xinyu in the first round.

== ITF Circuit finals ==
=== Singles: 10 (9 titles, 1 runner-up) ===
Legend W50 tournaments (1–0) W35 tournaments (4–0) W15 tournaments (4–1)	Finals by surface Hard (9–1)

Result	W–L	Date	Tournament	Tier	Surface	Opponent	Score
Loss	0–1	May 2025	ITF Monastir, Tunisia	W15	Hard	(United States) Hibah Shaikh	5–7, 2–6
Win	1–1	Aug 2025	ITF Roehampton, United Kingdom	W35	Hard	(United Kingdom) Hannah Klugman	6–1, 6–4
Win	2–1	Sep 2025	ITF Monastir, Tunisia	W15	Hard	Arina Bulatova	6–3, 6–3
Win	3–1	Sep 2025	ITF Monastir, Tunisia	W15	Hard	(Germany) Anna Petkovic	6–1, 7–5
Win	4–1	Mar 2026	ITF Monastir, Tunisia	W15	Hard	(Ukraine) Masha Lazarenko	6–1, 6–2
Win	5–1	Mar 2026	ITF Monastir, Tunisia	W15	Hard	(United States) Malaika Rapolu	7–6^{(4)}, 7–6^{(6)}
Win	6–1	May 2026	ITF Nottingham, United Kingdom	W35	Hard	(United Kingdom) Emily Appleton	6–3, 7–5
Win	7–1	May 2026	ITF Estepona, Spain	W35	Hard	(France) Nahia Berecoechea	6–1, 3–6, 6–2
Win	8–1	Jul 2026	ITF Nottingham, United Kingdom	W50	Hard	(United Kingdom) Naiktha Bains	6–3, 7–6^{(5)}
Win	9–1	Oct 2026	ITF Birmingham, United Kingdom	W35	Hard	(France) Manon Léonard	6–4, 6–3

=== Doubles: 15 (9 titles, 6 runner-ups) ===
Legend W75 tournaments (0–1) W50 tournaments (2–2) W35 tournaments (4–2) W15 tournaments (3–1)	Finals by surface Hard (9–5) Carpet (0–1)

Result	W–L	Date	Tournament	Tier	Surface	Partner	Opponents	Score
Win	1–0	May 2025	ITF Monastir, Tunisia	W15	Hard	(Lithuania) Patricija Paukštytė	(Slovakia) Mia Chudejová; Polina Leykina	6–0, 6–4
Win	2–0	Jul 2025	ITF Monastir, Tunisia	W35	Hard	(Lithuania) Patricija Paukštytė	(United States) Ashley Lahey (France) Tiphanie Lemaître	7–6^{(5)}, 6–4
Win	3–0	Jul 2025	ITF Roehampton, United Kingdom	W35	Hard	(United Kingdom) Amelia Rajecki	(Japan) Rinko Matsuda (Japan) Eri Shimizu	6–1, 6–4
Loss	3–1	Sep 2025	ITF Monastir, Tunisia	W15	Hard	(India) Tanisha Kashyap	Arina Bulatova (Germany) Anna Petkovic	2–6, 6–7^{(5)}
Win	4–1	Sep 2025	ITF Monastir, Tunisia	W15	Hard	(United States) Megan Heuser	(Canada) Raphaëlle Lacasse (South Africa) Nelise Verster	6–4, 6–7^{(6)}, [10–6]
Loss	4–2	Oct 2025	ITF Birmingham, UK	W35	Hard (i)	(Slovakia) Katarína Kužmová	(Czech Republic) Vendula Valdmannová (United Kingdom) Mimi Xu	3–6, 6–7^{(5)}
Win	5–2	Nov 2025	Trnava Indoor, Slovakia	W50	Hard (i)	(Estonia) Elena Malygina	Sofya Lansere (Czech Republic) Ivana Šebestová	3–6, 6–3, [10–6]
Win	6–2	Dec 2025	ITF Monastir, Tunisia	W35	Hard	(Canada) Ariana Arseneault	(United States) Kailey Evans (United States) Jordyn McBride	6–4, 6–2
Win	7–2	Jan 2026	ITF Manchester, UK	W50	Hard (i)	(Estonia) Elena Malygina	(United Kingdom) Emily Appleton (Poland) Weronika Falkowska	1–6, 7–6^{(6)}, [10–7]
Loss	7–3	Jan 2026	ITF Monastir, Tunisia	W50	Hard	(France) Tiphanie Lemaître	(Netherlands) Britt du Pree (Netherlands) Sarah van Emst	2–6, 6–4, [6–10]
Loss	7–4	Feb 2026	ITF Sheffield, UK	W35	Hard (i)	(Slovakia) Katarína Kužmová	(United Kingdom) Lauryn John-Baptiste (United Kingdom) Amelia Rajecki	6–4, 3–6, [8–10]
Win	8–4	Mar 2026	ITF Hagetmau, France	W15	Hard (i)	(Czech Republic) Lucie Petruzelová	(Italy) Carlotta Moccia (Spain) Paula Ortega Redondo	6–4, 6–2
Win	9–4	May 2026	ITF Estepona, Spain	W35	Hard	(Canada) Ariana Arseneault	(France) Nahia Berecoechea (Poland) Zuzanna Pawlikowska	6–4, 7–5
Loss	9–5	Jul 2026	ITF Dublin, Ireland	W50	Carpet	(Poland) Zuzanna Pawlikowska	(United Kingdom) Ella McDonald (United Kingdom) Amelia Rajecki	2–6, 1–6
Loss	9–6	Aug 2026	ITF Ourense, Spain	W75	Hard	(United Kingdom) Freya Christie	(Portugal) Francisca Jorge (Portugal) Matilde Jorge	walkover
