= Marie Bouzková =

Czech tennis player (born 1998)

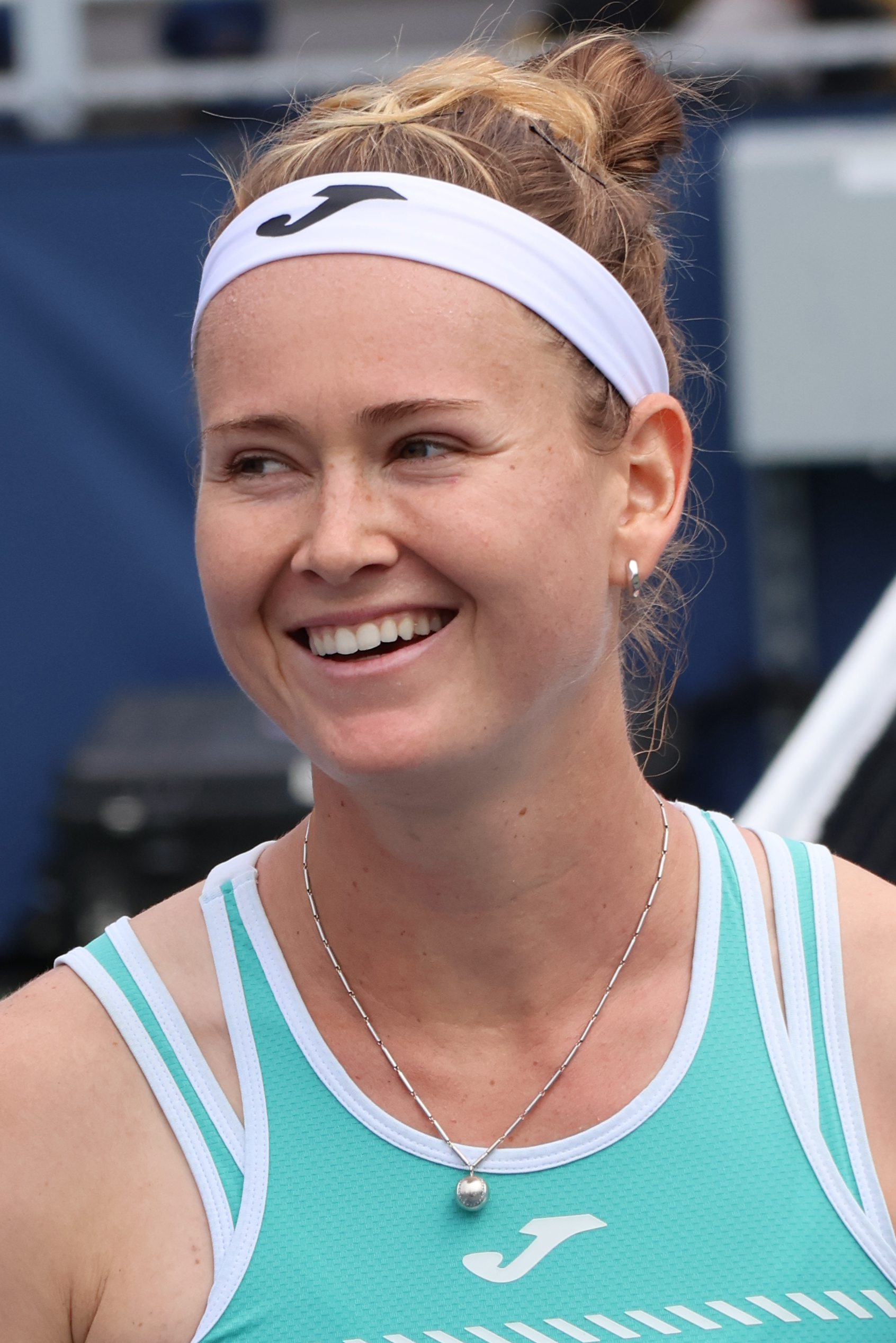
- Bouzková at the 2023 US Open
- Country (sports): Czech Republic
- Residence: Bradenton, Florida, US
- Born: 21 July 1998 (age 28) Prague, Czech Republic
- Height: 1.80 m (5 ft 11 in)
- Turned pro: 2013
- Plays: Right-handed (two-handed backhand)
- Coach: Marc López (Dec 2025-)
- Prize money: US$ 8,460,471

Singles
- Career record: 417–251
- Career titles: 4
- Highest ranking: No. 21 (13 July 2026)
- Current ranking: No. 26 (21 September 2026)

Grand Slam singles results
- Australian Open: 2R (2022, 2026)
- French Open: 3R (2024, 2025, 2026)
- Wimbledon: QF (2022)
- US Open: 3R (2023, 2026)

Doubles
- Career record: 126–82
- Career titles: 7
- Highest ranking: No. 15 (6 May 2024)
- Current ranking: No. 39 (21 September 2026)

Grand Slam doubles results
- Australian Open: 2R (2022, 2023, 2026)
- French Open: QF (2023)
- Wimbledon: SF (2023)
- US Open: QF (2021)

Grand Slam mixed doubles results
- Wimbledon: 1R (2021)

Team competitions
- BJK Cup: W (2026)
- Last updated on: 22 September 2026.

Marie Bouzková (Czech pronunciation: [ˈmarɪjɛ ˈbou̯skovaː], born 21 July 1998) is a Czech professional tennis player. She has a career-high singles ranking of No. 21 by the WTA, achieved on 13 July 2026, and a best doubles ranking of world No. 15, reached on 6 May 2024.

Bouzková has won four singles titles (at the 2022 Prague Open, 2025 Prague Open, 2026 Copa Colsanitas and 2026 Nottingham Open) and six doubles titles on the WTA Tour. In addition, she has won twelve singles titles and three doubles titles on the ITF Women's Circuit.

She won the 2014 US Open girls' singles title, defeating Anhelina Kalinina in the final. She made her WTA Tour debut at the 2015 Mexican Open, where she lost in the first round. Bouzková rose to prominence following her run to the semifinals at the 2019 Rogers Cup where she defeated Sloane Stephens, Jeļena Ostapenko, and Simona Halep, before falling to Serena Williams but she pushed the former world No. 1 to three sets, winning the first one 6–1. She won her maiden WTA Tour title in doubles, partnering fellow Czech Lucie Hradecká, at the 2021 Birmingham Classic.

== Early life and background ==
Bouzková was born in Prague to father Milan and mother Květa, and has a younger brother, Benjamin Milan. She began playing tennis at a club owned by her parents in Prague. She moved to Florida at age ten – initially trained at Bollietieri Academy for two years, before continuing to work with her dad and then Requeni from 2014. Marie admires the play of Serena Williams and Rafael Nadal. Besides Czech, she speaks some German, fluently English, and Spanish, and received her bachelor's degree in business administration with a minor in sports marketing and management through Indiana University East in 2022.

== Career ==
=== 2013–15: First titles on ITF Circuit & WTA Tour debut ===
Bouzková started playing as a senior in April 2013, at the WTA Tour tournament Katowice Open where she was handed a wildcard for qualifying but lost in the first round to Katarzyna Piter. Two months later, she made her debut on the ITF Women's Circuit at Zlín ($25k). Her first match win came in August at Prague when she defeated fellow Czech Nikola Fraňková.

In March 2014, she recorded her first ITF Circuit semifinal at Gainesville. For the second year in-a-row, she received a wildcard for the Katowice Open qualifying but again missed her WTA Tour main-draw debut. In early October, she won her first title at Hilton Head by defeating Natalia Vikhlyantseva in straight sets. Later, she reached the quarterfinals of the $50k Toronto tournament. As a result, she was noted in the WTA top 500.

Thanks to a wildcard Bouzková finally made her WTA Tour main-draw debut at the 2015 Mexican Open in Acapulco, losing to Sesil Karatantcheva in the first round. In April, she missed main draws of the Katowice Open and Prague Open. In June, she won two back-to-back tournaments at Grand Baie La Croisette on Mauritius, and followed this up with another title at La Possession on the isle of Réunion (France). In August, she reached finals of the Horb and Pörtschach events. In September, she made the semifinals of the $25k event in Monterrey; it was her last significant result of the year. In addition, she won another title at Grand Baie La Croisette, her only played tournament in doubles that year.

=== 2016–18: Success on the ITF Circuit & major debut ===
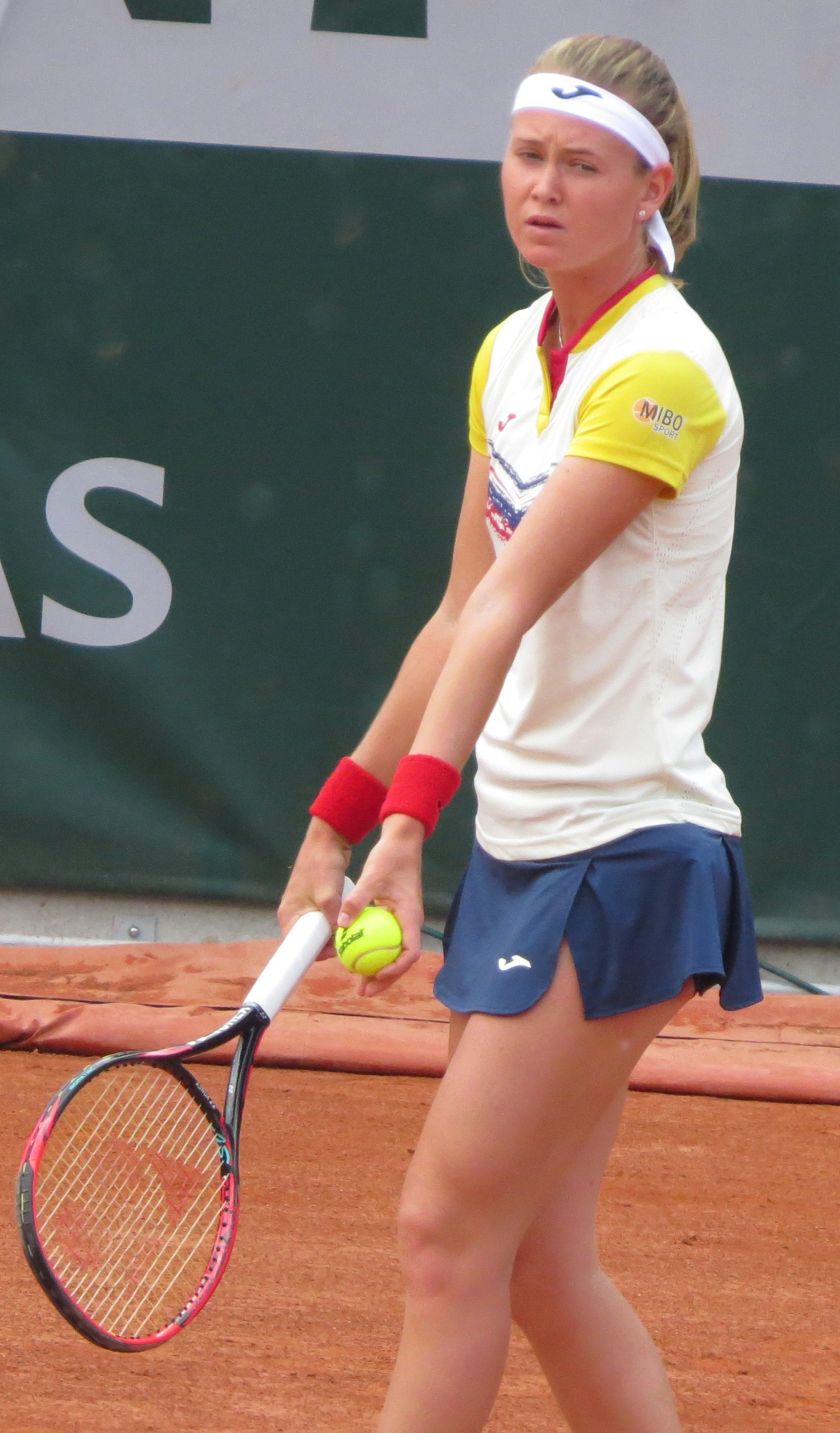
Bouzková at the 2018 French Open

The following three years, Bouzková had some success on the ITF Circuit. She started 2016 season as finalist in Fort-de-France (Martinique). She then travelled to Guadeloupe where she recorded her first title of the year at Petit-Bourg. In February, she won the $25k event in Cuernavaca, and then lifted the trophy in May at Monzón, Spain. A month later, she won the title at Puszczykowo, defeating Valeria Savinykh in the final, not dropping a single set during the tournament. In September, she played the qualifying of the Tournoi de Québec, her first appearance at any WTA tournaments of the season. After losing to Lauren Davis in the first round, she was forced to continue with ITF Circuit events. However, she had not reached any semifinals by the end of the year.

In January 2017, Bouzková suffered two early losses at two $25k events in the United States. Her next destination was Australia, where she began with a semifinal at the $60k Burnie International. After an early loss in the following week at the $60k Launceston International, she won the title at Perth ($25k) defeating compatriot Markéta Vondroušová. In early March, she failed to qualify for the Mexican Open in Acapulco but then won another title at Orlando. A month later, she entered the main draw of the Ladies Open Bien/Bielle through qualifying, as her first main-draw appearance since the Mexican Open in February 2015. She lost in the first round to Barbora Strýcová. Still in Switzerland, a week later Bouzková reached semifinals of the $25k Chiasso Open. In May, she reached another ITF final, this time at Monzón ($25k), but lost to Georgina García Pérez. Some progress was seen from Bouzková, since she made her major debut at the Wimbledon qualifying. After recording her first win there, she was stopped in the second round of qualifying. At the US Open, she had another attempt to reach a major main draw but lost in the first round of qualifying. In late September, she played in the final at Stillwater ($25k) but lost to Aleksandra Wozniak. She finished year with two early losses at WTA Challengers in Asia, in Hua Hin and Taipei, her WTA 125 debut.

Her 2018 season was marked with her major debut in singles and her return to compete in doubles events. After losing in the qualifying of the first three majors, Bouzková won three matches in the qualifying of the US Open and so entered the main draw. There, she lost her first match against Ana Bogdan. During the year, she advanced to only one final, at the $25k Irapuato tournament in February, and won the title by defeating Kristína Kučová. Playing only five events, she reached one semifinal, at the $60k Challenger de Granby in July 2018.

=== 2019: Premier-5 semifinal, top 100, three top-10 wins ===
For Bouzková season started at the Brisbane International where she passed qualifying, and in the first round faced Samantha Stosur. Bouzková won but was stopped in the next round by Karolína Plíšková. At the Australian Open, she lost in the first round of qualifying to fellow Czech Barbora Krejčíková. On both the Indian Wells and Miami Open, she failed to qualify. In the clay-court season, she reached the first round of the Prague Open, and passed qualifying at the French Open, before losing to Bianca Andreescu in round one. At Wimbledon, she also reached the main draw through qualifying. There, she beat Mona Barthel in the first round, before losing to Maria Sakkari in the second.

During the US Open Series, she played at the Silicon Valley Classic where she was beaten in the first round. The following week at the Canadian Open, she had her first appearance in the qualifying of some Premier-5 tournament, and she accomplished her career-best result so far. On the way to the semifinals, she defeated Leylah Fernandez, former US Open champion Sloane Stephens, former French Open champion Jeļena Ostapenko, and even two-time Grand Slam champion Simona Halep, with Stephens and Halep being her first two top-ten wins. Facing Serena Williams in the semifinals, Bouzková won the first set before Serena made a turnover and won the match. At the US Open, she made her main-draw debut in a major tournament without playing qualifying; however, she lost her first-round match to Ajla Tomljanović. On the Asian swing, she reached quarterfinals at Guangzhou, scoring her third top-ten win, over Elina Svitolina, and the second round at the Wuhan Open, but failed to qualify for the China Open.

In July, she reached the top 100, and finished the year as No. 57.

=== 2020: First WTA Tour singles final, top 50 in singles ===
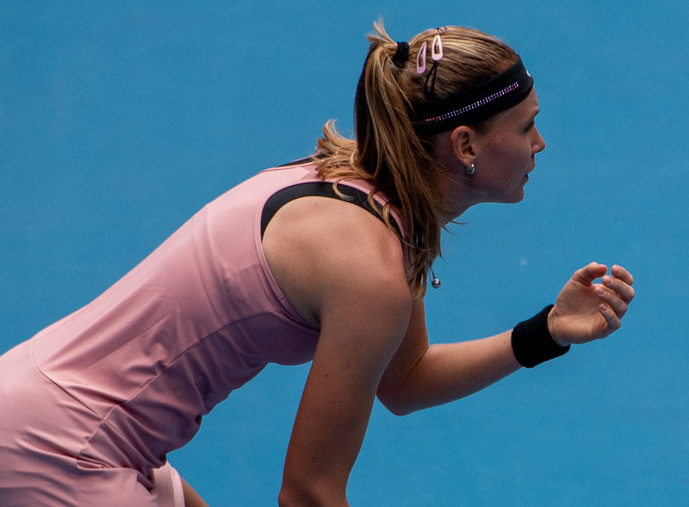
Bouzková at the 2020 Australian Open

Bouzková lost in the first rounds of the Brisbane International (to Madison Keys), and of the Hobart International the following week. Playing at the Australian Open for the first time in the main draw, she was stopped in round one by defending champion, Naomi Osaka. She suffered another opening-round loss at the Mexican Open. The following week at the Monterrey Open, she finally reached her first WTA Tour final but lost to Elina Svitolina in a tough three-setter. After that performance, she entered the top 50, at No. 47 on 9 March.

In her first tournament after the COVID-19 pandemic outbreak, she reached quarterfinals but lost to eventual champion Jennifer Brady. She also had success at the Cincinnati Open reaching the third round, before losing to Anett Kontaveit. At the US Open, she lost in the first round to Jessica Pegula. Playing at the Italian Open, she made her debut at that tournament but was stopped in the second round by Elena Rybakina. On 31 August, she reached a new career-high in singles, at No. 46.

=== 2021: Two doubles titles ===
In June, she won her maiden WTA Tour title in doubles at the Birmingham Classic, partnering compatriot Lucie Hradecká. They defeated the pair of Ons Jabeur and Ellen Perez in a tight three-setter. At the Prague Open, she lifted her second trophy, again with Hradecká, defeating Viktória Kužmová and Nina Stojanović in the final.

=== 2022: Wimbledon quarterfinal, WTA Tour singles title & top 30 ===
Bouzková recorded her first major match win at the Australian Open, over qualifier Rebecca Marino.At Indian Wells, she reached the third round at this tournament for the first time.

Partnering Sara Sorribes Tormo, she won the doubles title at the İstanbul Cup, defeating Natela Dzalamidze and Kamilla Rakhimova in the final.

Bouzková reached the third round at the WTA 1000-level at Madrid.At the French Open, she reached the second round in singles for the first time in her career but had to withdraw from her match against Elise Mertens and her doubles match due to COVID-19.

At Wimbledon, she defeated three Americans (seventh seed Danielle Collins, Ann Li and 28th seed Alison Riske) to reach the fourth round. Next, she defeated Caroline Garcia for the first Grand Slam quarterfinal in her career.

At the Prague Open, Bouzková defeated Anastasia Potapova to win the first career WTA Tour title. As a result, she returned to the top 50 in the rankings on 1 August 2022, at world No. 46.

At the WTA 1000 Cincinnati Open, she reached the second round and played against 11th seed Coco Gauff who retired. In doubles, she made the round of 16 with Laura Siegemund. As a result, she recorded a new career-high of No. 41 in singles, and returned to the top 40 in doubles.

At the WTA 1000 Guadalajara Open, she reached quarterfinals only for the second time at this level, defeating Liudmila Samsonova. She entered the semifinals, after Anna Kalinskaya was forced to retire from the match. As a result, she recorded a new career-high in the top 30 of the singles rankings. However, she lost her semifinal match to Maria Sakkari in two sets; play was delayed by rain after the first set and had to be continued the following day.

=== 2023: Third top-5 win & French Open quarterfinal, Rome doubles semifinal ===
She reached the fourth round of the WTA 1000 Italian Open for the first time, defeating sixth seed Coco Gauff for her third top-5 win. In the same tournament, on her debut in doubles, she reached semifinals, alongside Bethanie Mattek-Sands, using protected ranking. They lost the match to fourth seeds and eventual champions, Elise Mertens and Storm Hunter.

Bouzková and Sorribes Tormo won their first WTA 1000 tournament at the China Open, defeating Giuliana Olmos and Chan Hao-ching in the final.

==== French Open controversy ====
At the 2023 French Open, Miyu Kato and Aldila Sutjiadi were disqualified from the tournament during their doubles match after a ball returned by Kato accidentally hit a ball girl. The incident sparked controversy and criticism of opponents Bouzková and Sara Sorribes Tormo, who argued for the disqualification. Kato hit a one-handed backhand to return the ball towards the ball girl. The ball girl seemed aware that the ball was coming towards her and turned away but it unintentionally struck her anyway, causing her discomfort and tears. After a consultation with officials, Kato and Sutjiadi were defaulted. The punishment received surprise and backlash from some viewers and tennis commentators. Former player Gilles Simon criticized Bouzková's and Sorribes Tormo's actions, and some suggested they should face consequences for escalating the situation and lying about their role in calling for the default. Also for laughing after Kato and her partner were disqualified. The incident drew widespread attention and sparked debates about sportsmanship in tennis. Kato issued an apology, expressing remorse for accidentally striking the ball girl.

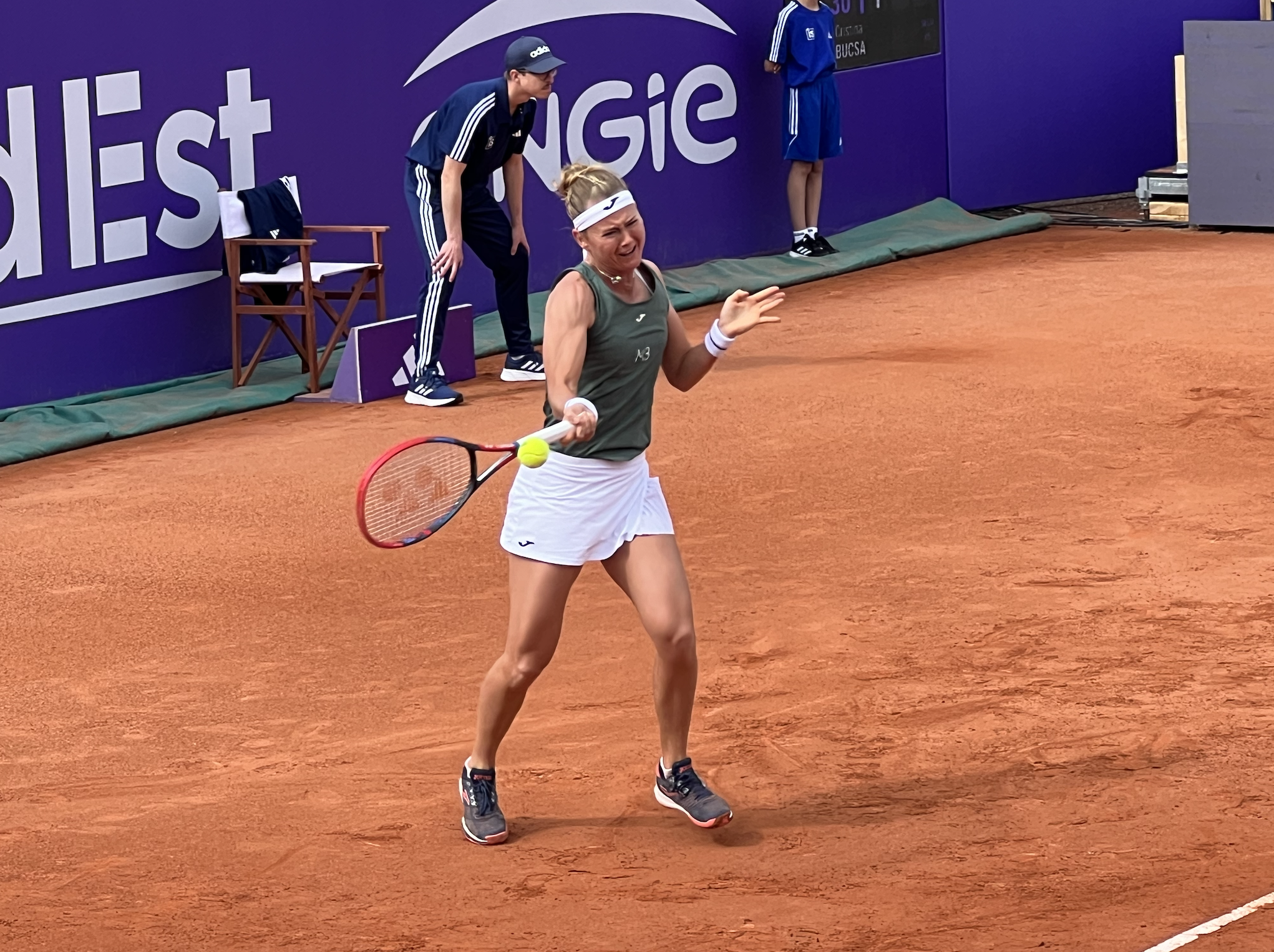
Bouzková hits a forehand in Strasbourg in 2024.

=== 2024: First WTA 500 final ===
Bouzková reached the final at the Washington Open defeating three Americans, qualifier McCartney Kessler, Taylor Townsend and wildcard Robin Montgomery, and then upset top seed Aryna Sabalenka, before ultimately losing to Paula Badosa in three sets.

As top seed at the Jiangxi Open, Bouzková overcame Alexandra Eala, lucky loser Yao Xinxin and fifth seed Kamilla Rakhimova to reach the semifinals, where she lost to eventual champion Viktorija Golubic.

=== 2025: Second Prague title ===
Bouzková defeated wildcard entrant Talia Gibson, seventh seed Jeļena Ostapenko and tenth seed Victoria Azarenka to make it through to the quarterfinals at the Brisbane International, at which point her run was ended by world No. 1 and eventual champion, Aryna Sabalenka.

As top seed at the Copa Colsanitas, wins over qualifiers Aleksandra Krunić and Raluca Șerban saw her reach her second quarterfinal of the year, where she faced another qualifier, Katarzyna Kawa, but this time lost in three sets.

In July on home clay at the Prague Open, Bouzková claimed her second career singles title, having previously won the same event in 2022, by defeating qualifier Gao Xinyu, lucky loser Lucrezia Stefanini, ninth seed Ann Li and Tereza Valentová to reach the final which she won in three sets against top seed Linda Nosková.

In August at the Monterrey Open, she defeated fourth seed Beatriz Haddad Maia in the second round and went on to reach the semifinals, but retired due to injury after losing the first set against second seed Ekaterina Alexandrova.

=== 2026: Two singles titles, first on grass ===
In February, Bouzková made it through to the quarterfinals at the Mérida Open, at which point she lost to Magdalena Fręch in three sets. As top seed at the Copa Colsanitas in April, she won her third WTA Tour singles title, and first away from Prague, defeating Panna Udvardy in the final. The following month, seeded eighth at the Strasbourg Open, Bouzková reached the quarterfinals but her run was ended by Ann Li.

Seeded fourth at the Nottingham Open in June, she defeated fellow Czech Tereza Valentová, lucky loser Hannah Klugman, Tatjana Maria and former world No. 1, Karolína Plíšková, to make it into her first grass-court final. In the championship match, Bouzková defeated third seed Emma Navarro to claim her fourth career singles title. She then reached the fourth round at Wimbledon, losing to Elise Mertens.

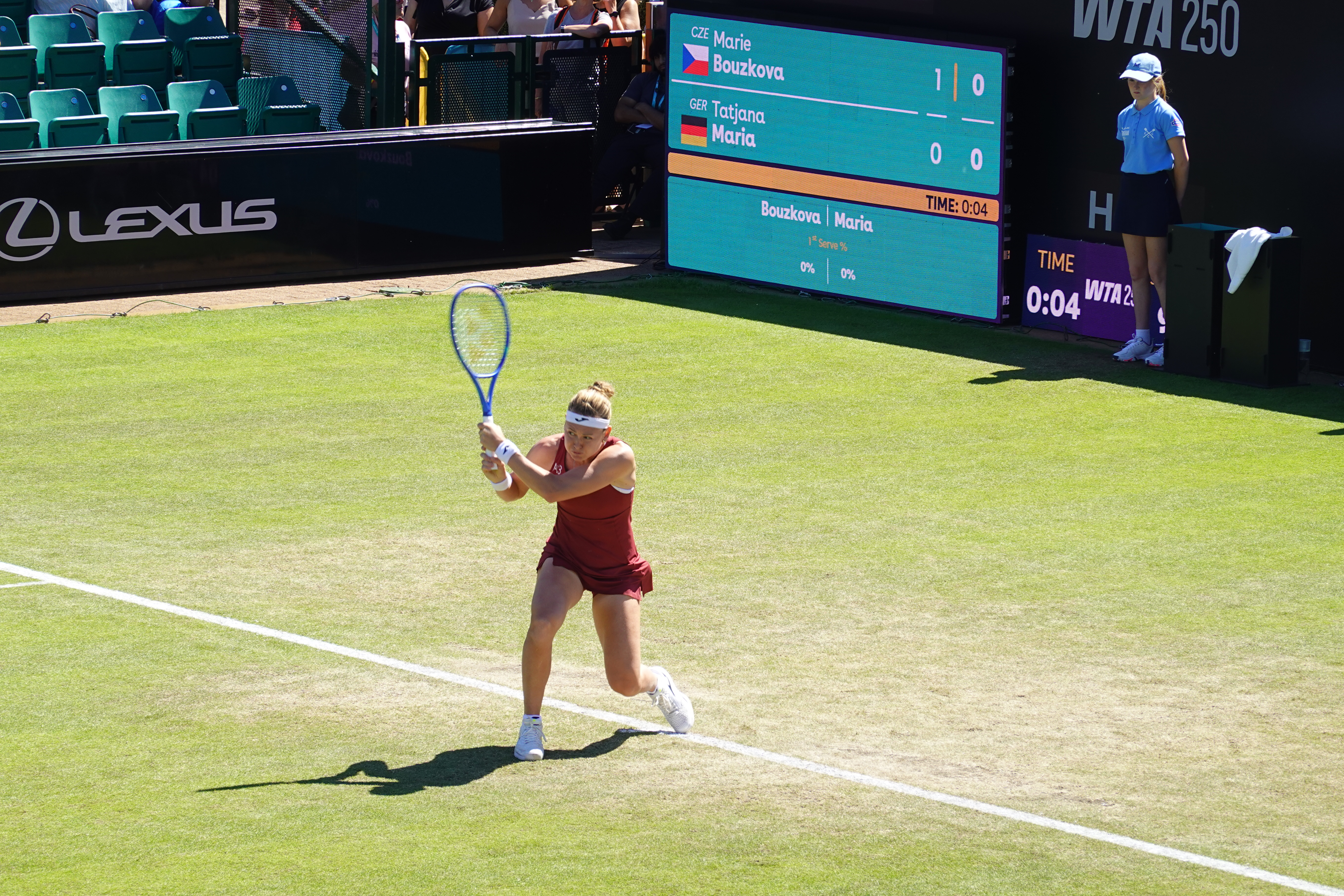
Bouzková at the 2026 Nottingham Open

Defending her title, and as top seed, at the Prague Open, Bouzková lost to fellow Czech player and fifth seed, Tereza Valentová, in the quarterfinals in a third set tiebreak.

In August at the WTA 1000 Cincinnati Open, she teamed with fellow Czech player Linda Nosková to win the doubles title, defeating Magali Kempen and Alexandra Panova in the final. Seeded 25th at the US Open, Bouzková lost in the third round against eighth seed Iga Świątek, in two tiebreak sets.

== Personal life ==
Bouzková's long-time partner is Aleksander Barkov, the Finnish-born professional ice hockey player who is a centre and captain for the Florida Panthers of the National Hockey League (NHL). Barkov has described tennis as his favorite sport outside of hockey.

== Career statistics ==
=== Grand Slam performance timelines ===
Key
W	F	SF	QF	#R	RR	Q#	P#	DNQ	A	Z#	PO	G	S	B	NMS	NTI	P	NH

(W) winner; (F) finalist; (SF) semifinalist; (QF) quarterfinalist; (#R) rounds 4, 3, 2, 1; (RR) round-robin stage; (Q#) qualification round; (P#) preliminary round; (DNQ) did not qualify; (A) absent; (Z#) Davis/Fed Cup Zonal Group (with number indication) or (PO) play-off; (G) gold, (S) silver or (B) bronze Olympic/Paralympic medal; (NMS) not a Masters tournament; (NTI) not a Tier I tournament; (P) postponed; (NH) not held; (SR) strike rate (events won / competed); (W–L) win–loss record.
To avoid confusion and double counting, these charts are updated at the conclusion of a tournament or when the player's participation has ended.

==== Singles ====
Tournament	2017	2018	2019	2020	2021	2022	2023	2024	2025	2026	SR	W–L	Win %
Australian Open	A	Q3	Q1	1R	1R	2R	1R	1R	1R	2R	0 / 7	2–7	22%
French Open	A	Q2	1R	1R	1R	2R (Note: Withdrawal during the tournament not counted as a loss.)	1R	3R	3R	3R	0 / 8	7–7	50%
Wimbledon	Q2	Q2	2R	NH	1R	QF	4R	2R	2R	4R	0 / 7	13–7	65%
US Open	Q1	1R	1R	1R	1R	2R	3R	2R	1R	3R	0 / 8	4–8	33%
Win–Loss	0–0	0–1	1–3	0–3	0–4	7–3	5–4	4–4	3–4	6–3	0 / 30	26–29	47%

==== Doubles ====
Tournament	2020	2021	2022	2023	2024	2025	2026	SR	W–L	Win%
Australian Open	1R	1R	2R	2R	1R	1R	2R	0 / 7	3–7	30%
French Open	2R	1R	A	QF	2R	A	2R	0 / 5	6–5	55%
Wimbledon	NH	QF	2R	SF	2R	2R	2R	0 / 6	11–6	65%
US Open	A	QF	A	A	3R	A	2R	0 / 3	6–3	67%
Win–Loss	1–2	6–4	2–2	8–3	4–4	1–2	4–4	0 / 21	26–21	55%
